= Titãs Trio Acústico =

- EP 01 cover

Studio album by Titãs
- Released: 3 April 2020 (EP 01); 3 July 2020 (EP 02); 25 September 2020 (EP 03); 29 January 2021 (Full version)
- Length: 1:13:18
- Languages: Portuguese, English (parts of "Querem Meu Sangue" only)
- Label: BMG
- Producers: Tony Bellotto, Branco Mello, Sérgio Britto, Sergio Fouad

Titãs chronology
Doze Flores Amarelas (2018)	Titãs Trio Acústico (2020)	Olho Furta-Cor (2022)

Singles from Titãs Trio Acústico
- 1. "Sonífera Ilha" Released: 20 March 2020; 2. "Enquanto Houver Sol" Released: 11 June 2020; 3. "Pra Dizer Adeus" Released: 28 August 2020

Titãs Trio Acústico (Note: The official streamings of the EPs always show the band's name as part of the release's; in other words, the project's name is "Titãs Trio Acústico" and not just "Trio Acústico".) is the sixteenth studio album by Brazilian rock band Titãs Released throughout 2020 by the BMG label, the EPs bring together acoustic versions of a total of 24 songs previously released by the group. Initially divided into three EPs throughout 2020, the disc won a full version on January 29, 2021, also on a physical double CD, bringing together the 24 tracks from the three EPs.

The project was conceived to celebrate the 20th anniversary of their Acústico MTV album, released in 1997; since in 2017 they were focusing on their rock opera Doze Flores Amarelas, the celebration wasn't possible until 2020.

== Background ==
=== Tour ===
In 2017, Titãs' Acústico MTV turned 20 years old since its release and fans were asking the band to celebrate the occasion somehow, but they were focusing on their rock opera Doze Flores Amarelas, which involved a complex and sophisticated tour. Since Brazil's economy wasn't going through a favorable time and fans kept requesting the celebration, the band started in 2019 a series of acoustic performances in which they mixed songs from the 1997 album, more recent works and older songs that hadn't been picked for Unplugged. The tour was named "Trio Acústico" (Acoustic Trio).

The first performance took place in Paulínia on 23 February, and the tour became a priority for the band, which conciliated it with the Doze Flores Amarelas promotional tour and a third tour called "Enquanto Houver Sol", this one in an electric format and involving songs from many eras of the group. The preference for Trio Acústico is due to the simplicity of the performances. Otávio Juliano, who directs the rock opera, is also responsible for this tour.

The tour's idea is to pay tribute to the album without copying it. Each show is divided into three parts: one with all three remaining original members; one in which each of them performs solo, and one with the trio performing with the two session members, Fabre and Lee. Usually, Bellotto sings "Polícia" and "Querem Meu Sangue"; Mello performs "Cabeça Dinossauro", "Tô Cansado" and "Toda Cor" alone on his acoustic guitar; and Britto plays "Miséria" and "Nem Cinco Minutos [Guardados]" (the latter on the piano, despite the song having been written on the acoustic guitar). During the shows, the members tell the story behind each song. This format was inspired by Springsteen on Broadway.

In 2018, vocalist and bassist Branco Mello took some time off the band to treat a tumor; according to him, the project marked his return to the band and, therefore, it is seen by him as an important moment in his career. The project's songs were rehearsed by the three current members in his living room; vocalist, keyboardist and bassist Sérgio Britto said the arrangements were created as if the band were preparing a small show for people paying them a visit at home.

=== Studio recording ===
As early as June 2019, Mello already mentioned the possibility of releasing the project on DVD or on a studio album. In 2020, the band announced the project would be recorded in studio and the resulting work would be released in three EPs with a total of 25 tracks. The first one was expected for March. The COVID-19 pandemic didn't change their plans, even if promotional shows would be impossible.

A new version of "Sonífera Ilha" was released as a single and video on 20 March, when it was announced that the three EPs would be released from April on via BMG, the label to which they returned in late 2019. The first EP (EP 01) was released on 3 April.

The second EP, EP 02, was released on 3 July and had a new version of "Enquanto Houver Sol" as single, released on 11 June. The third and last effort, EP 03, was released on 25 September and had a version of "Pra Dizer Adeus" as single. It received a video, released on 28 August.

On January 29, 2021, the album received its full version, with the 24 songs from the three EPs.

== Arrangements ==
On the first EP, "Sonífera Ilha" kept its ska characteristics. "Porque Eu Sei que É Amor" became a Motown/R&B/soul ballad reminiscent of The Temptations. The version of "Querem Meu Sangue" is sung both in Portuguese and English, with the verses of the original song ("The Harder They Come", by Jimmy Cliff). "Miséria" was transcribed to the piano, contrasting with the electronic arrangement of its original version. "Família" is the only track on the first EP featuring Fabre and Lee.

== Track list ==
EP 01 (songwriting credits source)
No.	Title	Writer(s)	Lead vocals	Length
1.	"Sonífera Ilha" (from Titãs)	Marcelo Fromer, Branco Mello, Tony Bellotto, Ciro Pessoa, Carlos Barmack	Mello	2:40
2.	"Porque Eu Sei que É Amor" (from Sacos Plásticos)	Sérgio Britto, Paulo Miklos	Britto	3:31
3.	"Isso" (from A Melhor Banda de Todos os Tempos da Última Semana)	Bellotto	Bellotto	2:36
4.	"O Pulso" (from Õ Blésq Blom)	Arnaldo Antunes, Fromer, Bellotto	Mello	3:03
5.	"Miséria" (from Õ Blésq Blom)	Antunes, Britto, Miklos	Britto	4:10
6.	"Tô Cansado" (from Cabeça Dinossauro)	Antunes, Mello	Mello	2:02
7.	"Querem Meu Sangue" (from Titãs)	Jimmy Cliff, Nando Reis	Bellotto	2:46
8.	"Família" (from Cabeça Dinossauro)	Antunes, Bellotto	Britto	3:22
Total length:				24:09

EP 02 (songwriting credits source)
No.	Title	Writer(s)	Lead vocals	Length
1.	"Enquanto Houver Sol" (from Como Estão Vocês?)	Sérgio Britto, Paulo Miklos	Britto	3:33
2.	"Toda Cor" (from Titãs)	Marcelo Fromer, Ciro Pessoa, Carlos Barmack	Branco Mello	2:51
3.	"Go Back" (from Titãs)	Kristian Tilgner, Michael Fubeder, Britto, Torquato Neto	Britto	3:51
4.	"Televisão" (from Televisão)	Arnaldo Antunes, Fromer, Tony Bellotto	Mello	3:51
5.	"Nem 5 Minutos Guardados" (from Acústico MTV)	Britto, Fromer	Britto	4:25
6.	"Polícia" (from Cabeça Dinossauro)	Bellotto	Bellotto	1:52
7.	"Homem Primata" (from Cabeça Dinossauro)	Fromer, Pessoa, Nando Reis, Britto	Britto	2:34
8.	"Bichos Escrotos" (from Cabeça Dinossauro)	Antunes, Britto, Reis	Mello	3:53
Total length:				26:54

EP 03 (songwriting credits source)
No.	Title	Writer(s)	Lead vocals	Length
1.	"Pra Dizer Adeus" (from Televisão)	Tony Bellotto, Nando Reis	Bellotto	3:44
2.	"Comida" (from Jesus não Tem Dentes no País dos Banguelas)	Arnaldo Antunes, Marcelo Fromer, Sérgio Britto	Britto	4:13
3.	"32 Dentes" (from Õ Blésq Blom)	Branco Mello, Fromer, Britto	Mello	2:49
4.	"É Você" (from Doze Flores Amarelas)	Britto	Britto	3:23
5.	"Epitáfio" (from A Melhor Banda de Todos os Tempos da Última Semana)	Britto, Fromer	Britto	2:52
6.	"Flores" (from Õ Blésq Blom)	Bellotto, Britto, Charles Gavin, Paulo Miklos	Mello	3:23
7.	"É Preciso Saber Viver" (from Volume Dois)	Roberto Carlos, Erasmo Carlos	Britto	3:35
8.	"Cabeça Dinossauro" (from Cabeça Dinossauro)	Antunes, Mello, Miklos	Mello	1:15
Total length:				25:15

== Critical reception ==
Professional ratings
Review scores
Source	Rating
O Povo	Unfavorable
Mauro Ferreira	3/5 stars

Writing for O Povo, Marcos Sampaio (having heard only the first EP by the time of his review) said the project "made it obvious that the band suffers the wearing, the weight and the force of its own history" and said "after so many losses and reinventions, it was hard to find a safe and promising path for the band. The songs hold the weight of the history [...] Nothing is bad, everything has quality. But we need to understand that Titãs are not the same anymore and this third acoustic project will be compared with the first one, which is cowardice". He also believes there was "a concern with showing how alive Titãs are and how they worried about rebuilding the songs so that they would sound rejuvenated. And maybe that's the biggest problem of this new project. The need to prove things, as if it was still necessary to prove anything to anyone."

In his blog on G1, journalist Mauro Ferreira said the "songs originally featured in punk-looking albums – such as 'Cabeça dinossauro' (...) and 'Comida' – sound artificial, just like the foul message of '32 dentes'. As technically competent as the songs' performances are, the trio Titãs already looks like a mere cover of the band that made history in the pop universe of Brazil in the 1980s and 1990s. [...] Everything's once had more lushness, more truth, more real emotion. Not even the inclusion of a recent song – 'É você' [...] diluted the feeling that Titãs produce as an acoustic trio the nostalgia of modernity."

== Personnel ==
Credits adapted from the song descriptions of the official tracks at YouTube. Some sources state Bellotto also played the semi-acoustic guitar without specifying the tracks.

=== Titãs ===
==== EP 01 ====
- Tony Bellotto
  - Lead vocals on tracks 3 and 7
  - Backing vocals on track 8
  - Acoustic guitar on tracks 3, 4, 6 and 8
  - Electric guitar tracks 2, 4 and 7
  - Production on all tracks except 3
- Branco Mello
  - Lead vocals on tracks 1, 4 and 6
  - Backing vocals on track 8
  - Electric bass on all tracks except 4 and 7
  - Acoustic guitar on track 6
  - Production on all tracks except 3
- Sérgio Britto
  - Lead vocals on tracks 2, 5 and 8
  - Backing vocals on tracks 3 and 7
  - Piano on all tracks except 4
  - Electric bass on track 4
  - Production on all tracks except 3

==== EP 02 ====
Credits for Titãs on the songs from the second EP are presented generically as follows:

- Tony Bellotto — lead vocals on track 6, backing vocals, acoustic guitar, twelve-string acoustic guitar, lead, rhythm and slide guitar, production
- Branco Mello — lead vocals on tracks 2, 4 and 8, backing vocals, acoustic guitar and production
- Sérgio Britto — lead vocals on tracks 1, 3, 5 and 7, backing vocals, keyboards, mellotron, organ, piano, synthesizer, acoustic guitar and production

==== EP 03 ====
- Tony Bellotto
  - Lead vocals on track 1
  - Acoustic guitar on tracks 2, 3 and 6
  - Electric guitar on tracks 4, 5 and 7
- Branco Mello
  - Lead vocals on tracks 3, 6 and 8
  - Backing vocals on tracks 2 and 7
  - Electric bass on all tracks except 3
  - Acoustic bass on track 3
  - Acoustic guitar on track 8
- Sérgio Britto
  - Lead vocals on tracks 2, 4, 5 and 7
  - Backing vocals on all tracks
  - Piano on all tracks except 3
  - Electric bass on track 3

=== Supporting members and guest appearances ===
- Beto Lee — acoustic guitar on track 8 from EP 01, tracks 4, 7 and 8 from EP 02, and all tracks from EP 03 except 7
- Mario Fabre — drums on track 8 from EP 01, tracks 4, 7 and 8 from EP 02, and all tracks from EP 03 except 8
- César Bottinha — finger snapping on track 1 from EP 01
- Sergio Fouad — production, finger snapping on track 1 from EP 01
- Emílio Martins — percussion on tracks 4 and 5 from EP 01, and tracks 3 and 6 from EP 02
- Yaniel Matos — cello on tracks 2 and 5 from EP 02, and all tracks from EP 03 (officially credited for the third EP, though one cannot actually hear any cellos on those songs)
- Eder Araújo — flute and clarinet on track 5 from EP 02; baritone saxophone on track 6 from EP 02

=== Technical personnel ===
- Sergio Fouad — production, sound engineering
- Caio Laranjeira, César Bottinha, Douglas Martins, Mauricio Gargel, Ricardo Camera — sound engineering
- Ricardo Bocci — sound engineering on EP 03
- César Bottinha — guitar technician on EP 02 and EP 03
- Luis Augusto — assistant on EP 03
