= Domingo (Titãs album) =

Studio album by Titãs
- Released: November 1995
- Recorded: September 1995
- Studio: Be Bop Sound (São Paulo, Brazil)
- Genre: Alternative rock
- Length: 63:58
- Label: WEA
- Producer: Jack Endino

Titãs chronology
Titanomaquia (1993)	Domingo (1995)	Acústico MTV (1997)

Singles from Domingo
- 1. "Domingo" Released: 1995

Domingo (Sunday) is the eighth studio album released by Brazilian rock band Titãs. The album became a gold record in Brazil. It is the second Titãs album produced by Jack Endino.

== Context ==
Domingo came after a period of solo projects by most of the band's members. Vocalists Branco Mello and Sérgio Britto (the latter also the keyboardist) had released Con el Mundo a Mis Pies under the moniker Kleiderman; the also vocalists Paulo Miklos and Nando Reis (the latter also the bassist) had made their solo debuts (Paulo Miklos and 12 de Janeiro, respectively), guitarist Tony Bellotto had published his first book, Bellini e a Esfinge and fellow guitarist Marcelo Fromer produced an album for new Warner artist Tivas Miguel, which included several songs penned by other Titãs members.

The solo releases were of different styles and exposed the fact that Titãs was formed by different minds and ideas. The band itself admits the albums always ended up leaving a member disappointed. Bellotto didn't felt represented by the electronic elements of Õ Blésq Blom. Reis only sang in one song of each of the two next albums (Tudo Ao Mesmo Tempo Agora and Titanomaquia). The solo efforts did not sell well and Bellotto stated in a 1997 interview that, if any of them experienced a commercial breakthrough, they would hardly go back to the band, which didn't perform well on the radio at that time. Even returning from periods in which they could make their own decisions, the seven members gathered to try and create their eight Titãs album. Years later, when promoting the release of the album Volume Dois, Britto called Domingo a "reconciliation album", claiming that Tudo ao Mesmo Tempo Agora and Titanomaquia sparked conflicts among the members. Domingo may have reconciled the septet "with diversity, which was always a way for us to accommodate all tastes." In a review for Showbizz magazine, journalist Leão Serva highlighted Britto's role in reuniting the group in a moment of uncertainties.

The heaviness of Titanomaquia caused the band to strengthen its ties with Brazilian heavy metal band Sepultura, to the point that they were even opening acts for the quartet in Argentina, in shows where the audience were hostile towards them; Reis would later consider it a "pushy" attempt to insert the band in a field to which they never belonged.

By the time of the album's release, Bellotto described it as "a more opened and varied album, with a bigger diversity of musical textures, more happy and relaxed". He also said the album came to prove the band was still alive, since the press allegedly considered the band to be over following so many solo efforts. Reis established comparisons between this album and its predecessor Titanomaquia, which, according to him, "is a shadowier album. The new album is shinier, has more color, is more rhythmically diversified. Like a Sunday after a dark Saturday night". The band also considers its diversity to reflect the musical heterogeneity within the group.

== Production ==
According to Reis, the band was supposed to enter studio in March, when drummer Charles Gavin returned from a course in London. However, production of Reis's debut solo album was delayed and he told the band he wouldn't be available in March, which generated arguments, especially from Gavin, who was infuriated with Reis stating that "if one member is not ready, the band is not ready".

It was pre-produced at Nota Por Nota Studios in São Paulo, between April and August 1995; then recorded at Be Bop Sound Studios, also in São Paulo, in September of the same year; mixed at Hanzek Audio, in Seattle in October of the same year and mastered at Starling Sound, in New York City, in the same month.

The song "Eu Não Aguento" marked the first time Titãs recorded a song written solely by non-members; its first seconds are a section of "Sangue Latino", by Secos & Molhados; indeed, the song's video reproduces the cover art of the trio's debut album.

Jack Endino, who considered Domingo his favorite Titãs album, commented on its creation:

When we started to discuss the recording of 'Domingo', I told them: 'there are always good pop and rock songs in your albums. You are not a heavy metal band, but a rock band with good songs. Let's make a solid rock album that everyone can like. Let's try something different, but with the confidence that it will be good'. They were already thinking the same thing.

== Release and promotion ==
The album's promotional tour started on 22 December 1995 at the Ginásio do Ibirapuera in São Paulo. In 1996, it was re-released with some bonus tracks, including remixed versions of "Eu Não Vou Dizer Nada (Além do que Estou Dizendo)" and "Tudo o que Você Quiser" and a new song: "Pela Paz", composed as the theme song for the campaign "Caminhada 89 pela Paz" (89 Walk for Peace), by radio 89 FM.

The album press-release was written by André Midani, who had been president of Warner Brasil and was now heading a larger area of the company. It was the last Titãs album to be released in vinyl and its cover was created by Britto and his brother Fabio.

== Track listing ==
Songwriting credits and lead vocal information adapted from the album booklet.

No.	Title	Writer(s)	Lead vocals	Length
1.	"Eu Não Aguento" (I Can't Stand)	Banda Tiroteio	Sergio Britto and Sérgio Boneka	4:35
2.	"Domingo" (Sunday)	Tony Bellotto and Britto	Paulo Miklos	4:05
3.	"Tudo O Que Você Quiser" (Everything You Want)	Branco Mello, Britto and Charles Gavin	Mello	2:30
4.	"Rock Americano" (American Rock)	Britto, Mauro and Quitéria	Britto	4:06
5.	"Tudo Em Dia" (Everything up to Date)	Mello, Arnaldo Antunes and Britto	Mello	2:50
6.	"Vámonos" (Let's go (in Spanish))	Britto	Britto	2:30
7.	"Eu Não Vou Dizer Nada (Além do Que Estou Dizendo)" (I'm not gonna say anything (Besides what I'm saying))	Marcelo Fromer, Bellotto, Nando Reis, Britto, Gavin and Miklos	Paulo Miklos	3:29
8.	"O Caroço da Cabeça" (The Stone of the Head)	Fromer, Reis and Herbert Vianna	Reis	3:55
9.	"Ridi Pagliaccio" (Laugh, Clown (Italian))	Mello, Bellotto and Britto	Mello	2:50
10.	"Qualquer Negócio" (Any Deal)	Mello, Fromer, Bellotto, Britto, Gavin and Miklos	Miklos	3:43
11.	"Brasileiro" (Brazilian)	Mello, Bellotto, Britto and Gavin	Mello	4:20
12.	"Um Copo de Pinga" (A glass of pinga)	Britto	Britto	1:21
13.	"Turnê" (Tour)	Mello, Reis, Britto and Gavin	Mello	2:40
14.	"Uns Iguais Aos Outros" (Some are like the others)	Britto and Gavin	Britto and Miklos	5:10

1996 CD edition bonus tracks
No.	Title	Writer(s)	Lead vocals	Length
15.	"Pela Paz" (For Peace)	Mello, Reis, Britto, Gavin and Miklos	Miklos	3:45
16.	"Eu Não Vou Dizer Nada (Além do Que Estou Dizendo) (remixed by Liminha)" (I'm not gonna say anything (Besides what I'm saying) (remixed by Liminha))	Fromer, Bellotto, Reis, Britto, Gavin and Miklos	Miklos	4:12
17.	"Tudo O Que Você Quiser (remixed by Raul Ralphes)" (Everything You Want)	Mello, Britto and Gavin	Mello	3:59
18.	"Tudo O Que Você Quiser (remixed by DJ Cuca)" (Everything You Want (remixed by DJ Cuca))	Mello, Britto and Gavin	Mello	3:45

== Single ==
Domingo single cover

The album's title-track was released as its only single, the band's tenth one, in 1995. The song later appeared as an acoustic version on the Volume Dois album.

=== Track listing ===
No.	Title	Writer(s)	Lead vocals	Length
1.	"Domingo" (Sunday)	Tony Bellotto, Sérgio Britto	Paulo Miklos	4:05

== Personnel ==
Adapted from the album booklet.

=== Titãs ===
- Branco Mello - lead vocals on tracks 3, 5, 9, 11 and 13, backing vocals
- Charles Gavin - drums, samplers and rhythmic programming
- Marcelo Fromer - electric guitar, acoustic guitar on tracks 12, 15 and 16
- Nando Reis - bass, lead vocals on track 8, backing vocals, acoustic guitar on tracks 8 and 12
- Paulo Miklos - lead vocals on tracks 2, 7, 10, 15 and 16, co-lead vocals on track 14, backing vocals, keyboards on track 8, sampler programming and editing, saxophone on track 9, and drums on track 12
- Sérgio Britto - lead vocals on tracks 4, 6 and 12, co-lead vocals on tracks 1 and 14, backing vocals, keyboards, third electric guitar on tracks 2, and acoustic guitar on track 12
- Tony Bellotto - electric and acoustic guitar, slide guitar on track 15, dobro guitar on track 16

=== Guest performances ===
- Andreas Kisser - third guitar on track 11
- Herbert Vianna - lead guitar on track 8
- Igor Cavalera - second drum kit on track 11
- João Barone - second drum kit on track 7
- Marcos Suzano - percussion on tracks 1, 10 and 13
- Sérgio Boneka - co-lead vocals on track 1
- Aureo Galli - samplers on track 4
- Liminha - programming, drums, bass, mandolin and acoustic guitar on track 15; programming and samplers on track 16

=== Technical staff ===
- Marco Antonio Cordeiro (Buru) and Edu Vianna - recording technicians
- Paulo Martins - pre-production assistant
- Fátima da Conceição - hostess
- Jack Endino - recording and mixing engineering
- Laura Brantes e Beto Machado - recording and mixing assistants
- Sombra Jones e Mario Amaral - roadies
- Nelson Damascena - executive production
- George Marino e Paulo Junqueiro - mastering
- Sérgio Britto - cover and picture of the swimming pool
- Fábio Afonso - cover and electronic publication
- Vânia Toledo - Titãs picture
- Juliana Toledo - drain picture
