= Volume Dois =

Studio album by Titãs
- Released: 9 October 1998
- Recorded: 1998
- Genres: Alternative rock, pop rock, new wave, symphonic rock, acoustic rock, MPB
- Length: 54:06
- Label: WEA
- Producer: Liminha

Titãs chronology
Acústico MTV (1997)	Volume Dois (1998)	As Dez Mais (1999)

Singles from Volume Dois
- 1. "É Preciso Saber Viver" Released: 1998

Professional ratings
Review scores
Source	Rating
Allmusic	4/5 stars

Volume Dois (Volume Two) is the ninth studio album released by the Brazilian rock band Titãs. Following the success of the previous album, Acústico MTV, Volume Dois features unplugged arrangements of previously recorded Titãs' songs, along with some new ones, and features musicians from the São Paulo Municipal Symphony Orchestra. It is one of their most successful albums, having sold more than 1 million copies as of 2015.

== Background, production and concept ==
In the final performances of the Acústico MTV tour, Titãs already talked about a future studio album with more acoustic versions of their songs. They were even already performing "É Preciso Saber Viver" by the time.

By the time of the album release, members Tony Bellotto (acoustic and electric guitarist) and Paulo Miklos (vocalist and saxophonist) commented that the band did not want to give in to electronic sounds: "We are a stage band, we like to play. It doesn't make sense, in a numerous band, to wait for the computer sequence before coming in with the guitars. This happened around the times of Õ Blésq Blom (...) Acoustic is the valuing of melodies, the electronic 'thing' more disturbed us than helped us".

Vocalist and keyboardist Sérgio Britto labeled the album as a "complement" to Acústico MTV, and not simply a new acoustic effort, pointing also that songs became lighter, but not necessarily acoustic.

== Recording and song information ==
The album recording sessions lasted for 4 months, a process that then vocalist and bassist Nando Reis would later consider tiresome. The band once again invited producer Liminha, seeking to repeat the quality of albums such as Cabeça Dinossauro and Jesus não Tem Dentes no País dos Banguelas (produced by him), but Reis considered the final result as below expectations, citing that Liminha overused then new Pro Tools to almost completely recreated entire arrangements; he also re-recorded some of his bass parts, for example on "Desordem".

The recording sessions were temporarily paused when drummer Charles Gavin's girlfriend was kidnapped. Also during the recording sessions, acoustic guitarist Marcelo Fromer took a one-month leave to travel to France and comment the 1998 FIFA World Cup for SporTV channel.

The hit "Sonífera Ilha" was chosen as the opening track for being "emblematic. Cheesy, trying to be pop, inventive", according to Bellotto.

When asked if "Caras Como Eu" was a song about feeling old, its author Bellotto replied:

No, it's natural, like, after so much time playing with Titãs, I'm already 38 and I have lots of children. It's natural that eventually you start thinking about this. You get older, you're no longer 18, and I thought a lot, when I was creating the song, of Titãs. We've been together for 16 years. It was different when we started, times have changed, we're all already different, but the spirit remains the same. The love we feel for our job remains the same. The song speaks a little about it. Now, of course time passes and you feel some changes, some limitations, and at the same time, also, the new discoveries and stuff. But the song talks a little about that, about getting older and realizing it.

Also asked it the song was a farewell one, he answered:

[...] It isn't, absolutely, a farewell. Much the contrary, it may even be a reverse album, like a restart, us exercising the ability to compose, to create music in a way adequate to what we're feeling, to the moment, to the age. It's not about writing a song because you're older or younger, but about saying what you mean to say. What you're thinking of life, having this freedom. We've always given ourselves this right. So, in this sense, it states a novelty like any other song of ours. I think a farewell wouldn't be a song. Our farewell will probably be a silent one, it won't be us doing songs.

== Release and marketing ==
The album was introduced to the press in a press conference hosted at restaurant Terraço Itália, atop Edifício Itália. A promotional tour followed, with its shows divided into three parts: one electroacoustic, one acoustic and one more rock-oriented, containing old hits not used in the album. Reproducing the performance of their predecessor in 1997, it was elected by Folha de S.Paulo readers as the best album and show of 1998.

In a contest promoted at Centro Universitário Belas Artes de São Paulo, students were invited to create canvases inspired by the album, and the winner would have their work reproduced and displayed in stores to promote the new release.

== Track listing ==
No.	Title	Writer(s)	Lead vocals	Length
1.	"Sonífera Ilha" (Sleepy Island)	Branco Mello, Marcelo Fromer, Tony Bellotto, Carlos Barmack and Ciro Pessoa	Paulo Miklos	2:50
2.	"Lugar Nenhum" (Nowhere)	Arnaldo Antunes, Charles Gavin, Fromer, Sérgio Britto and Bellotto	Mello	3:15
3.	"Sua Impossível Chance" (Your Impossible Chance)	Nando Reis	Reis	4:06
4.	"Desordem" (Disorder)	Britto, Fromer and Gavin	Britto	3:32
5.	"Não Vou Me Adaptar" (I Won't Adapt)	Antunes	Reis	3:41
6.	"Domingo" (Sunday)	Bellotto and Britto	Miklos	3:27
7.	"Amanhã Não Se Sabe" (Tomorrow it's not known)	Britto	Britto	3:08
8.	"Caras Como Eu" (Guys Like Me)	Bellotto	Mello	3:02
9.	"Senhora e Senhor" (Miss and Mister)	Antunes, Miklos and Fromer	Miklos	3:23
10.	"Era Uma Vez" (Once Upon a Time)	Fromer, Bellotto, Mello, Britto, Antunes	Mello	3:44
11.	"Miséria" (Misery)	Antunes, Britto and Miklos	Miklos and Britto	4:21
12.	"Insensível" (Insensitive)	Britto	Britto	3:26
13.	"Eu E Ela" (Me and Her)	Reis	Miklos	4:35
14.	"Toda Cor" (Every Color)	Fromer, Pessoa and Barmack	Mello	3:28
15.	"É Preciso Saber Viver" (It's Necessary to Know How to Live)	Roberto Carlos and Erasmo Carlos	Miklos	4:08
16.	"Senhor Delegado/Eu Não Aguento" (Mister Delegate/I Can't Stand It)	Antoninho Lopes, Jaú, Sérgio Boneka, Clover Over and Trambolhinho	Britto	2:36

== Personnel ==
=== Titãs ===
- Branco Mello - lead vocals on tracks 2, 8, 10 and 14, backing vocals
- Charles Gavin - drums and percussion
- Marcelo Fromer - acoustic guitar, electric guitar, backing vocals (credited, but does not sing)
- Nando Reis - lead vocals on tracks 3 and 5, bass, acoustic guitar, backing vocals
- Paulo Miklos - lead vocals on tracks 1, 6, 9, 11, 13 and 15, mandolin, banjo, harmonica, backing vocals
- Sérgio Britto - lead vocals on tracks 4, 7, 11, 12 and 16, keyboard, backing vocals
- Tony Bellotto - acoustic guitar, electric guitar, twelve string guitar, slide guitar, backing vocals (credited, but does not sing)

=== Guest musicians ===
- Liminha - acoustic guitar, electric guitar, bass, twelve string guitar, banjo, tambura, electronic programming
- Fat Family - vocals on track 15
- Flávio Guimarães - harmonica on tracks 2 and 6
- Jaques Morelenbaum - cello on track 14, string and Horn arrangements (except on tracks 1, 11 and 13)
- Eumir Deodato - string and Horn arrangements on tracks 11 and 13
- Marcelo Martins - tenor saxophone, flute, string and Horn arrangements on track 1
- Ramiro Musotto - percussion on tracks 1, 6, 7, 9, 11, 14 and 16
- William Magalhães - keyboard on track 7
- Daniel Garcia - flute, tenor saxophone
- Zé Canuto - flute, tenor saxophone, alto saxophone
- Eduardo Morelembaum - clarinet, bass clarinet
- Philip Doyle - french horn
- Henrique Band - baritone saxophone
- Zé Carlos - tenor saxophone
- Flavio Melo - flugelhorn, trumpet, piccolo trumpet
- Vitor Santos - tenor trombone
- Jessé Sadoc - trumpet, flugelhorn
- Flavio Santos - trumpet
- Altair Martins - trumpet, flugelhorn
- Paulo Roberto Mendonça - trumpet
- Gilberto de Oliveira - bass trombone
- José Machado Ramad - tenor saxophone
- Ismael de Oliveira - horn
- Zdenek Swab - horn
- Antonio Candido - horn
- Giancarlo Pareschi (Spala), José Alves, Bernardo Bessler, Alfredo Vidal, Antonella Pareschi, Paschoal Perrota, Walter Hack, Vera Barreto, Paula Barreto, Michael Bessler, Ricardo Amado: violins
- Marie Cristine Bessler, Frederick Stephany, Jesuina Passaroto, Jairo Diniz: violas
- Alceu Reis, Yura Ranevsky, Marcus de Oliveira, Cassia Menezes, Marcio Malard: cellos
