= As Dez Mais =

Studio album by Titãs
- Released: 1999
- Recorded: June, July and August 1999
- Genre: Alternative rock
- Length: 37:04
- Label: WEA
- Producer: Jack Endino

Titãs chronology
Volume Dois (1998)	As Dez Mais (1999)	A Melhor Banda de Todos os Tempos da Última Semana (2001)

Singles from As Dez Mais
- 1. "Pelados em Santos" Released: 1999; 2. "Aluga-se" Released: 2000

As Dez Mais (Portuguese for The Top Ten) is the tenth studio album by Brazilian rock band Titãs, and their first cover album. It was released in 1999, selling more than 400,000 copies. It was their last album with guitarist Marcelo Fromer, who died in 2001 just a few days before the first days of recordings of As Dez Mais' studio successor, A Melhor Banda de Todos os Tempos da Última Semana.

== Track listing ==
No.	Title	Writer(s)	Original artist	Length
1.	"Gostava Tanto de Você" (I Used to Like You So Much)	Edson Trindade	Tim Maia	3:59
2.	"Sete Cidades" (Seven Cities)	Renato Russo	Legião Urbana	3:26
3.	"Circo de Feras" (Circus of Beasts)	Tim	Xutos & Pontapés	3:50
4.	"Rotina" (Routine)	Clemente Nascimento	Inocentes	3:19
5.	"Querem Acabar Comigo" (They Want to Finish Me Off)	Roberto Carlos	Roberto Carlos	3:39
6.	"Fuga nº II" (Escape nº II)	Arnaldo Baptista, Rita Lee, Sérgio Dias	Os Mutantes	4:35
7.	"Pelados em Santos" (Naked in Santos)	Dinho	Mamonas Assassinas	3:29
8.	"Um Certo Alguém" (A Certain Someone)	Lulu Santos	Lulu Santos	3:21
9.	"Ciúme" (Jealousy)	Roger Moreira	Ultraje a Rigor	4:06
10.	"Aluga-se" (For Rent)	Cláudio Roberto, Raul Seixas	Raul Seixas	3:20

== Single ==
"Aluga-se" was released in 1999 as the thirteenth single by the band. The original song was composed and performed by Brazilian rock singer Raul Seixas, and it was featured on his 1980 album Abre-Te Sésamo.

=== Music video ===
The music video for the song shows the band performing it inside a night club crowded with young people drinking, dancing and smoking. Band members are seen playing a card game, and then playing pool.

== Critical reception ==
Professional ratings
Review scores
Source	Rating
Allmusic	3/5 stars
Folha de S.Paulo	1/4 stars

Writing for Folha de S.Paulo, Lúcio Ribeiro panned the album, stating it was another commercial play by the band that "seems to have permanently given up composing new material to fill an album". He also said the group "annihilated" all ten tracks, turning "Rotina" in a "boring ska" and depriving "Pelados em Santos" of its debauchery.

=== The band's position ===
Members Branco Mello (vocals), Nando Reis (vocals, bass) and Sérgio Britto (vocals, keyboards) commented: "Since 'Sonífera Ilha', a song made to be a hit, people mess around with us. We want to be TV stars [...] The guy who makes music just for selling doesn't exist. First, we do music for our entertainment. [...] This is independent from our will. We make a consuming product. Everyone has the right to say whatever they want, but, for us, the priority is artistic".

Later, in 2022, no longer a member by then, Reis admitted that As Dez Mais came out in a moment of "saturation" of the group, who was surfing the success of the two previous efforts, and he reflected that he participated in the album in a "lazy" way.

Producer Jack Endino said that there are elements of pop in the band's two previous albums, the well-sold Acústico MTV and Volume Dois, and in all their seven albums released before Titanomaquia (first Titãs album produced by him). He added:

I'm a rocker, but I like good songs very much. If a song has a good feeling and good lyrics, rhythms, energy, intelligence and emotion, then it's not necessary that it has a 'wall of guitars'. Anyway, the concept for 'As Dez Mais' was not my idea. I did the best album I could, considering these were not Titãs songs. And I tell you I get very happy with the way this album sounds. I didn't want the 'strings' added to the songs, it wasn't my idea, but Eumir Deodato did a good job, specially on 'Fuga 2'. As a Titãs fan, I would have preferred new compositions by them, but that wasn't what the band wanted at that time.

== Personnel ==
Titãs

- Branco Mello - lead vocals on tracks 1 and 4, co-lead vocals on track 7
- Paulo Miklos - lead vocals on tracks 6 and 8, co-lead vocals on track 10, harmonica, mandolin, banjo, backing vocals
- Nando Reis - lead vocals on tracks 3 and 9, co-lead vocals on track 7, bass
- Sérgio Britto - lead vocals on tracks 2 and 5, co-lead vocals on track 10, organ, piano, mellotron, wurlitzer, backing vocals
- Tony Bellotto - acoustic, electric and twelve string guitar
- Marcelo Fromer - acoustic and electric guitar
- Charles Gavin - drums

Additional personnel

- Jack Endino - bass on track 8, electronic drums arrangement on track 6, electric guitar and backing vocals on track 10
- Edu Morelenbaum - conducting
- Eumir Deodato - conducting
- Ricardo Imperatore - percussion
- Paschoal Perrota - violin and arrangement
- Cassia Menezes - cello
- Marcio Malard - cello
- Paula Prates - violin
- Ricardo Amado da Silva - violin
- Antonella Pareschi - violin
- Jesuina Passaroto - viola
- Bernard Marie Bessler - viola
- Daniel Garcia - saxophone, flute, saxophone solo on track 1
- Roberto Marques - trombone
- Altair Martins - trumpet, flugelhorn
- Ron Lawrence - viola
- N. Cenovia Cummins - violin
- Todd Reynolds - violin
- Richard Lucker - cello
- Maxine Neuman - cello
- Joyce Hammann - violin
- Robert Shaw - violin
- Stuart Mac Donald - tenor saxophone
- Jim Sisko - trumpet
- David Marriott, Jr. - trombone

Technical personnel

- Bae arrangements: Jack Endino and Titãs
- String and brass arrangements: Eumir Deodato (except "Rotina" and "Ciúmes", by Titãs and Jack Endino)
- Studios: Iron Wood Studios (Seattle), Hanzeck Audio (Seattle), Avatar Studios (NY), Ar Estúdio (RJ), Blue Studio (RJ) and ARP Estúdio (SP)
- ExcExecutive production: Charles Gavin
- Artistic direction: Tom Capone
- Recording engineering (Seattle): Jack Endino and Kip Beelman
- Recording assistants (Seattle): Donn Devore, Kip Beelman and Floyd Reitsma
- Recording engineering (NY): Álvaro Alencar
- Recording assistant (NY): Gregg Gasperino
- Recording engineering (RJ): Álvaro Alencar
- Recording assistants (RJ): André Rattones and Luciano Tarta
- Recording engineering (SP): Roberto Marques
- Recording assistant (SP): Nelson Damascena
- Mixing: Studio X (Seattle)
- Mixing engineering: Jack Endino
- Mixing assistant: Sam Hofstedt
- Mastering engineering: George Marino and Jack Endino (at Sterling Sound, NY)
- Graphic coordination: Silvia Panella
- Cover: Desenho Brasa
- Photos: Rochelle Costi
- Photo assistant: Marcelo Zochio
- Costume design: Cristiane Mesquita and Lilian Varella
- Roadies: Sérgio Molina, Sombra Jones and Viça
