= Titanomaquia =

Studio album by Titãs
- Released: 10 July 1993
- Recorded: 1993
- Genres: Punk rock, grunge, hardcore punk, alternative metal
- Label: WEA
- Producer: Jack Endino

Titãs chronology
Tudo Ao Mesmo Tempo Agora (1991)	Titanomaquia (1993)	Domingo (1995)

Titanomaquia (Titanomachy) is the seventh album released by Brazilian rock band Titãs, released on 10 July 1993. All songs are credited to the band as a whole (except for three tracks co-credited to the just-departed Arnaldo Antunes), as it happened in the previous album, Tudo Ao Mesmo Tempo Agora. Also, it marks the first time Jack Endino worked with them, the only foreign one they ever worked with.

Until December 1994, it had sold 125,000 copies in Brazil and 3,500 in Argentina.

== Background ==
=== Arnaldo Antunes's departure ===
Between the previous album (Tudo ao Mesmo Tempo Agora) and this one, vocalist Arnaldo Antunes announced his departure of the band, which caught the members off guard. Vocalist and bassist Nando Reis would later say that this separation would plant a seed in him that would later become his own will to leave, as well. According to him, guitarist Marcelo Fromer also expressed a wish to leave back then.

Reis would also say that it was in this album that his "isolation" within the band became obvious because, according to him, none of his suggestions would be accepted; the band insisted that he simply doubled the guitar riffs with his bass (which would contradict his "musical reasoning"); and he only sang on one of the tracks, while each of the other three vocalists sang on four.

The album was conceived in times when part of the Brazilian press considered rock from that country - as it had been done in the 80s - dead. Besides, according to Reis, the sessions were tense and the album's aggressivity reflects that.

Reis and a news story by Folha de S.Paulo state that drummer Charles Gavin was the one to suggest inviting Jack Endino, mas Gavin himself says it was the whole band's idea after researching then recent albums and agreeing on Endino. Still in bad terms with producer Liminha, they started a search for a foreign name that would match their increasingly more aggressive sound (they believed no Brazilian would be able to do what they wanted). After checking then recent albums, they agreed Endino would be an interesting name, both for his work with heavy rock bands (Nirvana, Soundgarden, Screaming Trees and his own group Skin Yard) and for his association with the independent scene, which made him more affordable. Their label recommended they chose a second name in case Endino refused, and they came up with Butch Vig, who succeeded Endino in Nirvana and produced the legendary Nevermind.

Through their label WEA, they sent him their Õ Blésq Blom album. Endino was initially confused as to why a band with such a sound was willing to have him produce their album, but once the band sent him newer songs, he became interested. :

It became clear that they really wanted to make rock 'n' roll with strong guitars, and the closest they have ever gotten to such idea, so far, was with Cabeça Dinossauro. I went to Brazil and started to realize exactly what they were planning to do, and the album leaned towards more of a "hard rock" side. [...] I know that it divided Titãs fans, but many of them, ten years later, still want Titãs to record another "hard rock" album such as that one. I'm sure, because I receive many e-mails from fans.

He also listened to Cabeça Dinossauro and Tudo Ao Mesmo Tempo Agora before starting his works. By the time of the album release, he claimed to find it "very interesting that they were willing to do the reverse of what was normally done - which is to go from more radical rock to pop".

According to Reis, the initiative to make the band sound increasingly heavier was led by vocalist Branco Mello and keyboardist/vocalist Sérgio Britto. the latter said in an interview around the time of the album's release that "the last album was only the disruption that allowed the creation of Titanomaquia".

When the album was released, the group rejected the "grunge" label and comparisons with Nirvana.

== Production ==
=== Recording ===
About Antunes's absence, Endino commented that the mood among the band wasn't tense and that the group, still a seven-piece band, was not upset about the member's exit, although they still showed much care for him. He spent at least 44 days creating the album with them.

The band recorded English language versions of some tracks of the album for a possible international release. The versions were penned by Brian Butler, then their co-worker at Banguela Records (which they had recently founded). Reis, Britto and Gavin say only some tracks were recorded, possibly the ones originally sung by Britto ("Agonizando", "Fazer o Quê" and "Será que É Isso que Eu Necessito?"), but a news story by Jornal do Brasil says some members flew to the MTV Video Music Awards in Los Angeles with a demo tape containing 11 tracks. One of the songs that got left out was "Dissertação do Papa Sobre o Crime Seguida de Orgia", since the band translated the lyrics literally, but within the "limit of the possible".

The tape would be handed to Endino, who suggested the versions himself. The group admitted that they were contemplating an international career, although they admitted it would be very difficult. Later, Endino himself discouraged them, stating that there were "100 bands around every corner" in the United States.

=== Cover art and title ===
The cover, once again created by Fernando Zarif, brings a collage of seven colors (each representing a member) and came involved by another cover, this one black, as if the album were wrapped in a bin bag.

The first title considered for the album was A Volta dos Mortos-Vivos ("The Return of the Living Dead"), but the band couldn't afford the rights for this name, which was already used for a 1985 film. It was Zarif who suggested using the term "titanomachy", the war between the titans and the gods of Greek mythology. According to Reis, the term is representative of the war Titãs lived back then: the one between the group and the press and the one between himself and the six other members.

== Song information ==
One of the tracks created for the album, "Meu Aniversário", written by Reis, was ultimately rejected by the band, but would be later released on his debut solo album and on the rarities compilation E-collection.

As with the precious album, the group is collectively credited for every track, except for "Disneylândia", "Hereditário" and "De Olhos Fechados", co-written by Antunes. For Reis, this was a "distortion", because he himself is credited for every track, but didn't effectively write (nor arrange) any.

The two first tracks of the album ("Será que É Isso Que Eu Necessito?" and "Nem Sempre se Pode Ser Deus") were selected to promote the album and received videos (both directed by Beto Brant and Ralph Strelow). The video of the first received the MTV Video Music Awards.

"Dissertação do Papa Sobre o Crime Seguida de Orgia", homonymous to a work by Marquis de Sade, lista uma série de assassinatos "bizarros".

A section of "Disneylândia", which according to the band speaks about access to global knowledge, was used as part of a question of the 2013 ENEM de 2013, specifically "Pilhas americanas alimentam eletrodomésticos ingleses na Nova Guiné / Gasolina árabe alimenta automóveis americanos na África do Sul. / (...) / Crianças iraquianas fugidas da guerra / Não obtém visto no consulado americano do Egito / Para entrarem na Disneylândia" (American batteries feed English home appliances in New Guinea / Arab gas feeds American cars in South Africa / (...) / War-fleeing Iraqi children / Do not obtain visa at the American consulate in Egypt / To enter Disneyland") for the examinees to analyze consuming and production relations in the world. The track was erroneously credited to Arnaldo Antunes only, but it had actually been written by him and the whole band.

== Release and promotion ==
Titanomaquia was released at an average price of Cr$ 1,000,000. Despite the costs with the special cover, the foreign producer and the press promotion, the band says Titanomaquia cost three times less than Õ Blésq Blom.

The album's promotional tour involved a stage scenery signed by Zarif and inspired by a work by French artist Francis Picabia for pianist Erik Satie.

One of the band's performances, at Olympia, was recorded and then aired by MTV on a special program on 10 September 1993.

== Critical reception ==
Professional ratings
Review scores
Source	Rating
Allmusic	3/5 stars

In a text about MTV's announcement of the Olympia's special, Sérgio Sá Leitão said the band no longer had the same talent it exhibited on Cabeça Dinossauro and that it now bet on "farofa" (Note: Apart from the linked dish, "farofa" can also be a Brazilian slang for something without relevance, unimportant.) and that they "had once made sense, somewhere in the past".

Writing for O Estado de S. Paulo, Marcel Plasse praised the band's attitude of going rock instead of pop, but considered the aggressiveness and the critiques too empty compared to those of Cabeça Dinossauro.

Tom Leão, on O Globo, praised the quality of the album for valuing the rock aspect of the songs, although he agreed it wasn't a classic at the same level of Cabeça Dinossauro.

In the section "Em questão", on Jornal do Brasil, Jamari França and Hélio Muniz had distinct opinions about the album. While the former considered it much better than the previous one, praising the instrumental parts and the production and criticizing only the vocals (which for them seemed scream as if the members had "a jackhammer in their stomachs"); the latter was pleased with the guitar and bass production only, calling the album "silly" and ridiculing what he called an attempt to "be the heaviest rock band in Brazil".

== Track listing ==
All tracks are written by Titãs, except "Disneylândia", "Hereditário" and "De Olhos Fechados", co-written by Arnaldo Antunes.

Titanomaquia track listing
No.	Title	Lead vocals	Length
1.	"Será Que É Isso Que Eu Necessito?" (Is This Really What I Need?)	Sergio Britto	2:49
2.	"Nem Sempre Se Pode Ser Deus" (It's Not Always Possible to Be God)	Branco Mello	2:15
3.	"Disneylândia" (Disneyland)	Paulo Miklos	2:46
4.	"Hereditário" (Hereditary)	Nando Reis	2:05
5.	"Estados Alterados da Mente" (Altered States of Mind)	Mello	3:42
6.	"Agonizando" (Agonizing)	Britto	3:35
7.	"De Olhos Fechados" (With Eyes Closed)	Miklos	2:11
8.	"Fazer o Quê?" (What to Do?)	Britto	3:27
9.	"A Verdadeira Mary Poppins" (The Real Mary Poppins)	Miklos	2:22
10.	"Felizes São os Peixes" (Happy Are the Fish)	Mello	2:13
11.	"Tempo Pra Gastar" (Time to Spend)	Britto	3:45
12.	"Dissertação do Papa Sobre o Crime Seguida de Orgia" (The Pope's Dissertation About Crime Followed by an Orgy)	Mello	3:07
13.	"Taxidermia" (Taxidermy)	Miklos	3:36

== Personnel ==
- Paulo Miklos - vocals, Synthesizer and Sampler (lead vocals on tracks 3, 7, 9 and 13, backing vocals)
- Sérgio Britto - Vocals, Mini-moog and Organ (lead vocals on tracks 1, 6, 8 and 11, backing vocals)
- Branco Mello - Vocals (lead vocals on tracks 2, 5, 10 and 12, backing vocals)
- Nando Reis - Bass and vocals (lead vocals on track 4)
- Charles Gavin - drums and percussion
- Tony Bellotto - Lead Guitar and Rhythm Guitar
- Marcelo Fromer - Rhythm & Lead Guitar

=== Additional personnel ===
- Jack Endino - Guitar (final chords on track 6), rhythm guitar and feedback on track 3
