= Sonífera Ilha =

1984 single by Titãs

Single by Titãs

from the album Titãs
- B-side: "Toda Cor"
- Released: 1984
- Genre: Post-punk, reggae fusion, ska
- Label: WEA
- Songwriter(s): Marcelo Fromer, Branco Mello, Tony Bellotto, Ciro Pessoa, Carlos Barmack
- Producer(s): Pena Schmidt

Titãs singles chronology
| "Sonífera Ilha" (1984) | "Insensível" (1985) |

Music video
- "Sonífera Ilha" on YouTube

"Sonífera Ilha" (Sleepy Island) is the debut single by Brazilian rock band Titãs, released in 1984. The song, as well as its b-side "Toda Cor", was co-composed by Ciro Pessoa, one of the lead singers and founding members of the group, who would leave the band before the release of their first, self-titled album, in which the single and the b-side were included. "Sonífera Ilha" is among a few of Ciro's contributions to Titãs.

The song has been covered by artists such as Adriana Calcanhotto, Pato Fu and Blitz, among others (see details below).

"Toda Cor" was included in the soundtrack of the 1984 film Bete Balanço.

== Background and composition ==
Unlike what was common practice at the time of the song's creation, the single would only be released after the album since the band - composed of nine members up until shortly before the album recording - didn't want to be represented by a single song.

Then vocalist Paulo Miklos (main singer of the song) described the track in 2012 as follows: "A ska with a kinda dodecaphonic thing, a kinda weird phrase, telling a cock-and-bull story. I never knew what the song is about."

== Reception ==
Although coming from an album that sold poorly, the song was a great hit in Brazil. According to website "A Vitrine do Rádio" and the Rolling Stone Brasil magazine, it was the song with most airplay in the country in 1984.

In a 2020 video, then former vocalist and bassist Nando Reis commented that "Sonífera Ilha" was the only song that the audience knew at the time of its release and their other songs sounded too different from the track, and that because of it they would sometimes perform the song three times in a single show.

== Track listing ==
| No. | Title | Lyrics | Lead vocals | Length |
|---|---|---|---|---|
| 1. | "Sonífera Ilha" (Sleeping Island) | Marcelo Fromer, Branco Mello, Tony Bellotto, Ciro Pessoa, Carlos Barmack | Paulo Miklos | 2:54 |
| 2. | "Toda Cor" (Every Color) | Fromer, Pessoa, Barmack | Mello | 3:24 |
| Total length: | | | | 7:18 |

== Titãs Trio Acústico version ==
"Sonífera Ilha"

Single by Titãs

from the album Titãs Trio Acústico
- Released: 20 March 2020
- Genre: Acoustic rock, ska
- Label: BMG Rights Management
- Songwriter(s): Marcelo Fromer, Branco Mello, Tony Bellotto, Ciro Pessoa, Carlos Barmack

Titãs singles chronology
| "Porque Eu Sei Que É Amor (acoustic)" (2019) | "Sonífera Ilha" (2020) | "Enquanto Houver Sol" (2020) |

In 2020, the band, then reduced to a trio (Branco Mello on vocals, acoustic guitar and bass; Sérgio Britto on vocal, keyboards and bass; and Tony Bellotto on vocals, acoustic and electric guitar, re-recorded the track as part of their Titãs Trio Acústico project.

The new version, sung by Mello, received a video with guest appearances by band Os Paralamas do Sucesso; musicians Rita Lee, Roberto de Carvalho, Andreas Kisser, Lulu Santos, Cyz Mendes (singer who guest performed on the band's opera rock, Doze Flores Amarelas), Érika Martins, Elza Soares and marcelo fEdi Rock; actors Fábio Assunção and Fernanda Montenegro; sports commentator and former football player Casagrande; and Marcelo Fromer's (the band's guitarist until his death in 2001 and co-author of the track) daughter, Alice.

The video was directed by Otávio Juliano, who said: "'Sonífera Ilha' is a song that left a deep mark in generations. When I listened to the new acoustic version, I felt it was more than a song, it was a state of mind. It came from there the idea of inviting artists and friends that were part of Titãs' history, bringing their personalities and embarking on this state of mind with the band".

The guest appearances were recorded by the artists themselves in their houses; such aesthetics would end up coinciding with the quarantine to which several people subjected themselves due to the coronavirus pandemic in 2020. By then, Bellotto said in an interview to O Globo newspaper:

Different social groups, groups of doctors, everyone was finding a sense in that video. Lots of people saying that the video and the song served as some kind of relief in this distress moment of ours, which made me very happy. The extreme and essential purpose of art is exactly that.

== Cover versions ==
- Adriana Calcanhotto, on her 1990 debut album Enguiço
- Paulinho Moska on his 1997 live album Através do Espelho
- Moraes Moreira (from Novos Baianos) on his solo album 50 Carnavais
- Terra Samba (2004)
- Karla Sabah on her 2004 solo album Drum 'n Bossa
- Blitz on their 2006 live album Blitz - Com Vida
- Pot-pourri recorded the song and it was featured as the opening theme for the Rede Globo telenovela Três Irmãs (Three Sisters)
- Pato Fu on their 2010 album Música de Brinquedo
