= Acústico MTV: Titãs =

Acústico MTV

Live album by Titãs
- Released: 23 May 1997
- Recorded: March 6–7, 1997 at Teatro João Caetano, Rio de Janeiro
- Genre: Acoustic rock
- Length: 1:11:40
- Label: WEA
- Producer: Liminha

Titãs chronology
Domingo (1995)	Acústico MTV (1997)	Volume Dois (1998)

Singles from Acústico MTV
- 1. "Pra Dizer Adeus" Released: 1997; 2. "Flores (part. Marisa Monte)" Released: 1997; 3. "Nem 5 Minutos Guardados" Released: 1997; 4. "Os Cegos do Castelo" Released: 1998

Acústico MTV is the second live album released by Brazilian rock band Titãs. It's part of the MTV Unplugged series and resulted in a tour, a CD, a DVD and a TV special broadcast by MTV on 22 May from that year.

The show featured various guest performances, including Argentinian singer Fito Páez on "Go Back", Marisa Monte on "Flores", Jamaican Jimmy Cliff on "Querem Meu Sangue", and ex-Titãs singer Arnaldo Antunes on "O Pulso". Páez also sings and plays the piano on the DVD version of "Televisão", while the CD version (recorded in studio) is sung by guest Rita Lee and played by also guest Roberto de Carvalho. The CD also features a short version of "Cabeça Dinossauro" sung by Marina Lima. Maria Bethânia was also expected to perform a version of "Miséria".

== Conception ==
The band was initially reluctant about participating in the project, resisting to it for about 3-4 years. They were finally convinced by MTV, which highlighted its success abroad, but as long as they could set up the whole thing to their taste. Their idea was "to go radical. Let's do it with an orchestra, let's depart from rock'n roll and do something totally different." The label's president, André Midani, however, was skeptical and questioned the group's ability to play "bossa nova" for having "the essence of a punk rock band".

Then vocalist and bassist Nando Reis believes Titãs's Acústico set the trend of having special guests in Acústico MTV shows. In order to create the brass and wind arrangements of the songs, the group invited Jaques Morelenbaum. The then septet rented a house in Granja Viana, where guitarist Marcelo Fromer lived, to rehearse.

The album marked the return of longtime producer Liminha, with whom they recorded up to Õ Blésq Blom (1989). They had already worked again together in the special single "Pela Paz", a song for an anti-gun ownership campaign.

Despite it having been a radio and commercial success, the band rejected the idea of it being an album conceived with commercial interests. They said creating these versions for their own songs was a challenge. As vocalist and bassist Nando Reis said, "we had to prove that Titãs could be different from Titãs and still be as good as them". They were afraid of sounding "pathetic", but were happy with growing their audience and to be back on the radio. Reis said the work was "a relief. It is very important for a band of this size to be popular. We have no underground vocation. I have no vocation to perform for half a dozen people. This does not mean to make the work mediocre". The album was also thought of as a celebration of the band's 15th anniversary, more precisely of their very first show. One year later, when they released its successor Volume Dois, members admitted that they ran some risks by transforming long standing hits, to the point that they could no longer tell composition from arrangement.

== Tour and promotion ==
In order to transport all musicians involved with the project from one performance to another, the band would travel on two buses. The last performances of the tour took place in 4 and 5 April 1998, at Olympia in São Paulo. These only happened after much requests from the fans, since the tour was supposed to end on 14 March at Ibirapuera Gymnasium, after 140 shows. In these last performances, the band already presented to the public their version of "É Preciso Saber Viver", a hit from Volume Dois, which they were conceiving at the time.

In 2019, amidst the band's "Trio Acústico" tour, which celebrated 20 years of Acústico MTV, Britto said the band was surprised by that time with the success of the album: "Many people bet on this idea that our songs would succeed, while others thought they wouldn't match. We ourselves had some doubts. [...] Yet, I feel that when the album came out we were surprised with the speed and the reach it had in terms of popularity. Our audience went through a radical renewal. We started playing to very young audiences and to an increasing number of women. Maybe we were the most popular group of that year, taking all genres into account."

== Song information ==
Apart from tracks taken from every album by the band until then (except for Tudo Ao Mesmo Tempo Agora (1991) and Domingo (1995)), the album and DVD featured four new songs: "Os Cegos do Castelo", "Nem 5 Minutos Guardados", "A Melhor Forma" and "Não Vou Lutar"; each is sung by each of the vocalists of the band's line-up at the time (respectively, Nando Reis, Sérgio Britto, Branco Mello e Paulo Miklos). "A Melhor Forma", "Nem 5 Minutos Guardados" and "Não Vou Lutar" were composed long before the album (the two former were originally planned for Õ Blésq Blom) and were resurrected for this release.

Originally, only one new track would appear and the band chose "Os Cegos do Castelo"; later, however, Reis said this generated some discomfort (particularly with Branco Mello and Sérgio Britto) so they decided to have one new track for each vocalist. Originally, Marisa Monte would guest perform on "Os Cegos do Castelo" and this was indeed recorded, but she ended up performing on "Flores". "Os Cegos do Castelo" was set to be the album's third single, after "Pra Dizer Adeus" and "Flores", but 89 FM Radio played "Nem 5 Minutos Guardados" and the label decided to leave "Cegos" as the fourth and last single. Singer Maria Bethânia was invited to sing on "Miséria", but ended up cancelling her performance.

"Go Back" is featured in the album as a Spanish language version created by Martin Cardoso for Os Paralamas do Sucesso and to which Britto added some verses by Pablo Neruda in a spoken part. He did something similar on "Homem Primata", this time with some verses by Bob Marley. The version of "Prá Dizer Adeus" was chosen for radio airplay. In the first shows (including the ones recorded for the releases), "Bichos Escrotos" and "Polícia" consisted of short, virtually a cappella jingles by the band singing with the audience, but they eventually earned their own, full versions.

In a 2014 interview, Reis explained that, unlike what many people believed, "Os Cegos do Castelo" makes no reference to Titãs, but to his relation with cocaine: "There are subliminal messages about this topic [Reis' relation to drugs] in many other songs of mine. "Cegos no castelo" is one of them. [...] It's much about my blindness, my isolation. The castle is a place where metaphorically I encastled myself." One of the song's chord was inspired by "King Midas in Reverse", written by Graham Nash and released on the live album 4 Way Street by Crosby, Stills, Nash & Young, which Reis was listening to a lot back then.

== Track listing ==
No.	Title	Writer(s)	Lead vocals	Length
1.	"Comida" (Food)	Arnaldo Antunes, Marcelo Fromer, Sérgio Britto	Paulo Miklos	5:22
2.	"Go Back" (Contains a section of the poem "Farewell y los sollozos" by Pablo Neruda)	Britto, Torquato Neto (version: Martin Cardoso)	Britto, Fito Páez	3:50
3.	"Família" (Family)	Antunes, Tony Bellotto	Nando Reis	3:38
4.	"Prá Dizer Adeus" (To Say Goodbye)	Bellotto, Reis	Miklos	3:42
5.	"Os Cegos do Castelo" (The Blind of the Castle)	Reis	Reis	4:50
6.	"O Pulso" (The Pulse)	Antunes, Fromer, Bellotto	Antunes	3:19
7.	"Marvin"	R. Dunbar, G N. Johnson (version: Britto, Reis)	Reis	4:24
8.	"Nem 5 Minutos Guardados" (Not Even 5 Minutes Kept)	Britto, Fromer	Britto	4:05
9.	"Flores" (Flowers)	Charles Gavin, Bellotto, Miklos, Britto	Branco Mello, Marisa Monte	3:35
10.	"Palavras" (Words)	Britto, Fromer	Britto	2:38
11.	"Hereditário" (Hereditary)	Titãs & Antunes	Reis	2:31
12.	"A Melhor Forma" (The Best Way)	Britto, Miklos, Mello	Mello	3:11
13.	"Cabeça Dinossauro (vinheta)" (Dinosaur Head (jingle))	Antunes, Miklos, Mello	Marina Lima	0:37
14.	"32 Dentes" (32 Teeth)	Mello, Fromer, Britto	Mello	3:04
15.	"Bichos Escrotos" (Freaky Critters)	Antunes, Britto, Reis	Miklos	1:44
16.	"Não Vou Lutar" (I'm Not Gonna Fight)	Miklos, Britto	Britto	3:09
17.	"Homem Primata (vinheta)" (Primate Man (jingle))	Britto, Fromer, Reis, Ciro Pessoa	Britto	0:34
18.	"Homem Primata" (Primate Man)	Britto, Fromer, Reis, Pessoa	Britto	3:18
19.	"Polícia (vinheta)" (Police (jingle))	Bellotto	Britto	3:32
20.	"Querem Meu Sangue (The Harder They Come)" (They Want My Blood (The Harder They Come))	Jimmy Cliff (version: Reis)	Reis, Cliff	3:32
21.	"Diversão" (Fun)	Britto, Reis	Miklos	4:41
22.	"Televisão" (Television)	Antunes, Fromer, Bellotto	Mello, Rita Lee	4:53
Total length:				1:11:40

== Reception ==
Professional ratings
Review scores
Source	Rating
Allmusic	4.5/5 stars
Folha de S.Paulo	Favorable
Folha de S.Paulo	Favorable
Folha de S.Paulo	Unfavorable

The album polarized critics inside Folha de S.Paulo. Luiz Antônio Ryff considered it "great" and that the CD version manages to "preserve the energy of the show and highlight the qualities of the band's performance. Maybe the most important of all is to prove that one does not need to equip a wall of amplifiers with guitars in order to make a vigorous show." He also considered that some tracks earned versions better than the original and that "even when there is improvisations, the result is fine". However, a few months later, he would consider the acoustic shows of Os Paralamas do Sucesso better - the band would only release their Acústico MTV album in 1999.

Marcos Augusto Gonçalves said the work "resurrected" the band which "dived into a crisis that could have ended it". "More mature, more relaxed with the individual liberty acquired in the last years and willing to escape from the alley in which they got into, the seven members of the group - who already tried a more eclectic work with "Domingo"- found in the 'unplugged' formula the way out of their difficult situation.

On the other hand, Pedro Alexandre Sanches considered Acústico MTV a pure commercial play. He deemed it "illogic" to deprive "Polícia", "Cabeça Dinossauro" and "Homem Primata" from their aggressiveness in favor of "the tackyness of the strings which ravages MPB" and to accept well versions of "Go Back" and "Comida" sung badly by "singers [...] with so little will to improve". He also criticized the version of "Go Back" for having transformed Torquato Neto's poem "into a badly pronounced and sung Spanish, using, once more, the bobo alegre (Note: "Bobo alegre" means literally "silly happy" and refers to a person that becomes easily glad with anything despite the situation in which they are.) Fito Paez as a pretext of transnational consecration".

Álvaro Pereira Júnior panned the album and considered it to be "the worst of 1997". He said: "Pseudo-existential dilemmas, headiness, 'deep' arrangements. The worst faults that could affect a rock band appear in great doses. [...] Titãs are a fake band, the direct heirs of the affectation and conformism, fuel of this monster that dominates Brazilian music, the caetanic establishment. They shifted styles zillions of times (curiously, always embarking on what's being successful) and make a serious pose, in the best Herbert Vianna school of pretension".

He had already expressed dislike for the album in a June 1997 text in which he accused the work of being "artificial" and compared them to pagode group Negritude Júnior, stating the latter had a more rock and roll attitude than the former. He also said: "Now, analyzing Titãs' trajectory (it sucks to talk about them again, but this "unplugged" album is of an abysmal badness, it's hard to escape), we see a band always trying to be what they're not. Raised on little contemplative caetanic music, they already tried new wave, grunge, head, punk and only now, finally, they clearly embraced the pretentious MPB that shaped them.

In a pool involving 870 readers of Folha, however, the majority elected the album, the show and the band as the bests of the year. "Prá Dizer Adeus" was also chosen as the best song.

In August 2018, Lucas Brêda, at Vice magazine, elected Titãs' Acústico as the worst Acústico MTV in a list with 31 of the 33 albums released in Brasil under the project.

=== Commercial reception ===
The album sold 180,000 copies in less than one month, 500,000 until 18 August 1997 and three days later it was already their best-selling album, with 700,000 copies. In October 1997, the one million mark was reached. The album went on to earn a diamond certification and sold over 1,7 million copies - a number that exceeded the label's goal of one million copies, but not manager Manoel Poladian's prediction. He believed the album would sell three million copies. It's the second best-selling Acústico MTV album, behind only Kid Abelha's release.

=== Album certification ===
Region	Certification	Certified units/sales
Brazil (Pro-Música Brasil)	Diamond	1,000,000^{*}
^{*} Sales figures based on certification alone.

== Personnel ==
Adapted from the CD booklet:

=== Titãs ===
- Branco Mello – lead and backing vocals
- Nando Reis – lead and backing vocals, acoustic bass, acoustic guitar on "Os Cegos do Castelo"
- Sérgio Britto – lead and backing vocals, piano, Hammond organ
- Paulo Miklos – lead and backing vocals, mandolin
- Marcelo Fromer – acoustic guitar
- Tony Bellotto – acoustic guitar, Twelve-string guitar, slide, dobro on "Televisão"
- Charles Gavin – drums

=== Guest performances ===
- Arnaldo Antunes - lead vocals on "O Pulso"
- Marisa Monte - co-lead vocals on "Flores"
- Jimmy Cliff - co-lead vocals on "Querem Meu Sangue (The Harder They Come)"
- Marina Lima - lead vocals on "Cabeça Dinossauro (vinheta)"
- Fito Paez - co-lead vocals on "Go Back" and piano on "Televisão" (DVD version)
- Rita Lee - co-lead vocals on "Televisão" (CD version)
- Roberto de Carvalho - piano on "Televisão" (CD version)

=== Session musicians ===
- Liminha – acoustic guitar, acoustic bass on "Os Cegos do Castelo"
- Marcos Suzano – percussion
- Antonella "Fievel" Pareschi – Violin
- Mariana "Rapunzel" Salles – Violin
- Cassia Passaroto – Cello
- Maria Flavia Martins – Cello
- Cristina Braga – Harp
- Flavio de Mello – Trumpet
- Vitor Santos – Trombone
- Philip Doyle – Horn
- José Canuto – Alto Saxophone and flute
- Marcelo Martins – Tenor Saxophone and flute
- Eduardo Morelenbaum – Bass clarinet

=== Technical personnel ===
- Artistic direction - Paulo Junqueiro
- Base arrangements - Titãs and Liminha
- Strings and brass arrangements - Jaques Morelenbaum, Liminha and Titãs
- Brass arrangements ("Família", "Homem Primata", "Querem Meu Sangue"), brass and strings ("Diversão") - Marcelo Martins, Liminha and Titãs
- Technical direction - Paulo Lima
- Recording engineering - Vitor Farias
- Recording assistants - Marcelo Calvario, Daniel Pires, Breno Gradel, Bruno Leite and Mario Léo
- Additional engineers - Denilson Campos and Alexandre Saggesa
- Mixing: U.M.Q.A. (Unidade Móvel Quiosque do Amor)
- Mixing engineering - Vitor Farias and Liminha
- Mixing assistants - Marcelo "Bro" Calvario, Mario Léo, Breno Gradel and Bruno Leite
- Digital edition - Denilson Campos, Liminha and Titãs
- Mastering engineering - Ricardo Garcia, Magic Master
- Graphic project - Toni Vanzolini, Gualter Pupo and João Bonelli
- Graphic coordination - Silvia Panella
- Photos - Juan Steves, Marcelo Rossi, Mila Maluhy (Rita Lee) and Marcia Ramalho (Marina Lima)
- Production (Titãs) - Nelson Damascena
- Production assistant (Titãs) - Wilson Rosa
- Roadies - Sombra Jones, Sergio Molina, Gerson Molina
- Security - Lauro Silva e Luiz Gomes
- Sound: MacAudio
- P.A. Engineering - Carlos Pedruzzi
- Monitor engineering - Andre Nogueira
- Technician - Edilson Meireles
- P.A. - Paulo Junqueiro
- Light - Marcos Olivio / Spectrum
- Costume design - Ellen Igersheimer
- Scenery - Tom Vanzolini e Gualter Pupo
- Roadies - Liminha e Breno Gradel
- "Cabeça Dinossauro" - recorded at Unidade Móvel Quiosque do Amor, by Vitor Farias and Liminha.
- Assistants - Marcelo "Bro" Calvario and Mário Léo
- "Televisão" - recorded at Artmix, São Paulo, by Antoine Midani
- Assistants - Alexandre Soares, Edgard Popó and Alexandre Russo
