= Jesus não Tem Dentes no País dos Banguelas =

Studio album by Titãs
- Released: November 23, 1987
- Recorded: August – October 1987
- Studio: Estúdio Nas Nuvens, Rio de Janeiro, RJ
- Genre: Pop rock
- Length: 37:24
- Label: WEA
- Producer: Liminha

Titãs chronology
Cabeça Dinossauro (1986)	Jesus não Tem Dentes no País dos Banguelas (1987)	Go Back (1988)

Singles from Jesus não Tem Dentes no País dos Banguelas
- 1. "Lugar Nenhum" Released: 1987; 2. "Comida" Released: 1987; 3. "Desordem" Released: 1988; 4. "Diversão" Released: 1988

Jesus não Tem Dentes no País dos Banguelas (Portuguese for "Jesus Has no Teeth in the Land of the Toothless") is the fourth studio album by Brazilian rock band Titãs, released on November 23, 1987. Like its predecessor Cabeça Dinossauro, it was produced by Liminha and featured electronic music experimentations and funk rock influences, besides tackling social issues in its lyrics. Its recording took place at Nas Nuvens studio in Rio de Janeiro and lasted for little more than two months.

It was promoted at the 1988 Hollywood Rock, which boosted the band's popularity. Songs such as "Lugar Nenhum", "Nome aos Bois" and especially "Comida", which became an anthem for student activists, became notorious among the public.

The album was a critical and commercial success, being considered one of the best and most important albums by the band and being certified double platinum by (then) ABPD in 1994. In 2011, it was re-released and made available for digital download the following year.

== Background and production ==
The band's previous album Cabeça Dinossauro was a commercial success and is considered a Brazilian rock landmark.

Titãs already had their songs ready for the album but were awaiting the return of producer Liminha, who was in London working with Sigue Sigue Sputnik, in order to commence work in studio on 20 August. Despite that, vocalist and keyboardist Sérgio Britto said that Jesus marks a new point of integration with him, because in the previous effort the band entered the studio with the album "pretty much done".

When he returned, he brought an extensive musical material and asked the group to dedicate three days to listen to it. The repertoire included Control, by Janet Jackson, and albums by Robert Palmer, The Power Station, Joe Jackson and Jamaican dub.

The recording began amidst its predecessor's promotional tour, at Nas Nuvens studios. On 24 October, its mixing was finished, and the material was sent to Townhouse Studios in London.

== Launch and publicity ==
The album's promotional pictures were taken at Consolação Cemitery, in São Paulo. One of them, with the members on top of a grave, was featured on the front page of a Folha de S.Paulo issue. Then mayor Jânio Quadros was upset with the photograph and fired the cemetery's manager.

The album was released on 23 November 1987, but it was only performed to the public the following year, at the first edition of Hollywood Rock at Apoteose Square on 6 January and at Morumbi Stadium on 13 January. The band's performance was considered the best part of the festival by Jornal do Brasil while Folha de S.Paulo considered it "a Brazilian rock landmark". Around that time, Titãs's experienced a sharp rise in popularity, which was named a "titanmania" by IstoÉ magazine. Members were doing more shows that they wanted to, according to vocalist Arnaldo Antunes. On 19 February 1988, the album was officially released with a show at Projeto SP, which marked the beginning of a domestic tour.

== Songwriting and lyrical themes ==
"In Cabeça Dinossauro, you guys demolished the five pillars of social order, the police, the State, the church, family and wild capitalism. Now it's time for you to start demolishing things from within. [...] Titãs is what's left of rock, their lyrics are what's left of a failed country, a vice-country, vice-ruled, vice-happy, vice-versa."

— Section of the album's press-release by Paulo Leminski

The title of the album came from an expression coined by vocalist/bassist Nando Reis's wife, Vânia. She said Brazil was "the land of the toothless", referring to the poverty that affected the country. The front and back covers feature eight pillars of a Greek temple (four on each side), each representing one of the members. The spaces between them are like empty slots in a dental arch, alluding to the title. The temple also alludes to the band's name (Titãs translating as Titans, gods from the Greek mythology). The pictures were taken by an uncle of vocalist Branco Mello, who had traveled to Greece.

The differences between this album and Cabeça Dinossauro, according to Antunes, is that this album had "the electronic data, the electronic drum, the programming". He referred to the usage of electronic beats and synthesizers, which would later be used on the band's next studio effort, Õ Blésq Blom. Luciano Borges, at Folha de S.Paulo, described the album as "Titãs's Sgt. Peppers". Even with the electronic elements, the album retained its predecessor's heaviness.

Although there was no official division of the album in sides 1 and 2 (the division was made using the letters "J" and "T", instead of the typical "A" and "B";) the album had indeed two musical sides: one characterized by funk beats, while the other is "more rock." The division was so remarkable that the English technicians that did the LP cut believed it to be a split album.

Charles Gavin sought new sounds for his drums for this album, expanding his kit and trying new and more elaborated fills. This caused conflicts in studio; one particular episode in which Liminha tells him off was filmed by Mello and featured in the band's documentary Titãs – A Vida Até Parece Uma Festa. Gavin ended up with a smaller set provided by the studio and, later, he and producer talked about what he wanted from the instrument. Because Gavin was heavily influenced by John Bonham (Led Zeppelin), Liminha helped him create lines inspired by "Black Dog" on "Lugar Nenhum". "Lugar Nenhum" received airplay in October 1987.

The acoustic guitar on "Desordem" was inspired by The Cure; the bass line of "Corações e Mentes" was re-done mixing electronic and analogical sounds. One of the sounds heard at the rhythmic section of "Diversão" was obtained from a sheet pan. Reis, Liminha and Paulo Junqueiro were chatting at the studio's kitchen when Reis accidentally dropped one and its sound hitting the floor pleased them all so much, they wanted to have it recorded.

Improvised percussion was used with other non-musical objects throughout the album, such as on "Infelizmente" (with sounds of a cutlery box falling on the floor)), besides a sampler. The final result of "Diversão" involved so many sounds that the 24 channels of the studio were not enough, and the musicians had to record some sounds simultaneously at the same channel.

"Nome aos Bois" lists several infamous or controversial personalities of World and Brazilian History such as Hitler, Stalin, Médici, Franco, Idi Amin, General Custer, Mark Chapman, Plínio Salgado, Jim Jones, among others.

In a 2021 video, Reis said the song felt a bit biased for including mostly right-wing names. He also said Ronaldo Bôscoli was included because he once wrote an article panning the band following a performance at Canecão. Reis says he now regrets having mentioned him. In 1989, the band released "O Pulso", seen as a pathological counterpart to "Nome aos Bois" for listing several diseases, conditions and disorders.

The album was labeled "difficult to understand" by André Singer at Folha de S.Paulo, "perhaps because it isn't an album to dance to, nor for selling only, nor for protesting only". Mario Cesar Carvalho, writing for the same newspaper, noticed that, unlike the previous album, this tackled everyday issues such as love, food, fun, disorder and lies. However, he noticed "a manifesto atmosphere" on "Comida", stating the album "is more a poetical listing of urgent demands".

== Track list ==
No.	Title	Lyrics	Lead vocals	Length
1.	"Todo Mundo Quer Amor" (Everybody Wants Love)	Arnaldo Antunes	Antunes	1:18
2.	"Comida" (Food)	Antunes, Marcelo Fromer, Sérgio Britto	Antunes	3:59
3.	"O Inimigo" (The Enemy)	Branco Mello, Fromer, Tony Bellotto	Mello	2:13
4.	"Corações e Mentes" (Hearts and Minds)	Fromer, Britto	Britto	3:47
5.	"Diversão" (Fun)	Nando Reis, Britto	Miklos	4:45
6.	"Infelizmente" (Unfortunately)	Britto	Britto	3:01
7.	"Jesus não Tem Dentes no País dos Banguelas" (Jesus Has No Teeth in the Land Of The Toothless)	Fromer, Reis	Reis	2:11
8.	"Mentiras" (Lies)	Fromer, Britto, Bellotto	Miklos	2:09
9.	"Desordem" (Disorder)	Charles Gavin, Fromer, Britto	Britto	4:01
10.	"Lugar Nenhum" (Nowhere)	Antunes, Gavin, Fromer, Britto, Bellotto	Antunes	2:56
11.	"Armas pra Lutar" (Weapons to Fight)	Antunes, Mello, Fromer, Bellotto	Mello	2:10
12.	"Nome aos Bois" (Names to the Oxen)	Antunes, Reis, Fromer, Bellotto	Reis	2:06
13.	"Violência" (Violence; not included in the vinyl version)	Gavin, Britto	Miklos; Mello (spoken word part)	2:48

== Reception and legacy ==
Professional ratings
Review scores
Source	Rating
AllMusic	3/5 stars

The album was well received by the critics. It expanded the horizons of the "claustrophobic Cabeça Dinossauro", according to Arthur Dapieve, who said the sophistication of the arrangements and of the lyrics didn't cause a decrease in the aggressiveness of the band. Eduardo Rivadavia from Allmusic said, with regards to social critiques and non-conventional structure of the songs, the album exceeded expectations. On the other hand, he pointed out that its calculated abrasiveness "fell much short" of replicating the "genius" of the previous album. Due to the usage of digital effects and electronic music, Luciano Borges, from Folha de S.Paulo called it "Brazil's most inventive 87 album." Writing for Jornal do Brasil, Luiz Carlos Mansur said the album could be considered "the best album produced in Brazil in 1987".

It is considered one of the best and most important albums by Titãs, which was "in its creative and popularity apogee", according to O Estado de S. Paulo. The same newspaper said Cabeça Dinossauro, this album and Õ Blésq Blom "form the best sequence of albums by the band", while IstoÉ magazine considers it and its successor "watersheds for Titãs's career and for Brazilian rock itself." On the other hand, André Forastieri from Folha de S.Paulo said the album was "too irregular and sounded like a Cabeça [Dinossauro] remake".

Bizz magazine elected it as the best album of 1987, tied with 3 Lugares Diferentes, by Fellini. In his book Dias de Luta, Ricardo Alexandre revealed that the vote was deliberately tempered with, since originally Fellini's release had won by a fine margin, but its bassist Thomas Pappon was part of the magazine staff, which raised concerns of bias and conflict of interest accusations in electing his effort as the best.

The album sold over 250,000 copies and boosted some of its songs' popularity, such as "Lugar Nenhum" and "Nome aos Bois". The most popular one was "Comida", which became an anthem for student protests in the 1980s. In 1994, the album was certified double platinum by ABPD.

In January 2011, Polysom re-released the album on 180 grams vinyl. It was also included on the band's catalogue on iTunes, in 2012, to mark their 30th anniversary. For the same purpose, guitarist Tony Bellotto considered re-releasing Jesus não Tem Dentes no País dos Banguelas with bonus, previously unreleased material.

In a 2021 video in his YouTube channel, Reis said it was his favorite Titãs album, give or take Tudo ao Mesmo Tempo Agora. "Comida" was ranked by the Brazilian edition of Rolling Stone as the 68th greatest Brazilian song.

== Personnel ==
=== Titãs ===
- Arnaldo Antunes — vocals
- Branco Mello — vocals
- Paulo Miklos — vocals
- Marcelo Fromer — rhythm and lead guitar
- Tony Bellotto — lead and rhythm guitar
- Sérgio Britto — keyboard and vocals
- Nando Reis — bass guitar and vocals
- Charles Gavin — drums and percussion

=== Additional personnel ===
- Liminha — electric guitar and synth bass in ("Comida"), drum machine (in "Todo Mundo Quer Amor", "Comida" and "O Inimigo") sampler (in "Diversão") and classical guitar (in "Desordem")
