= Titãs =

Brazilian rock band

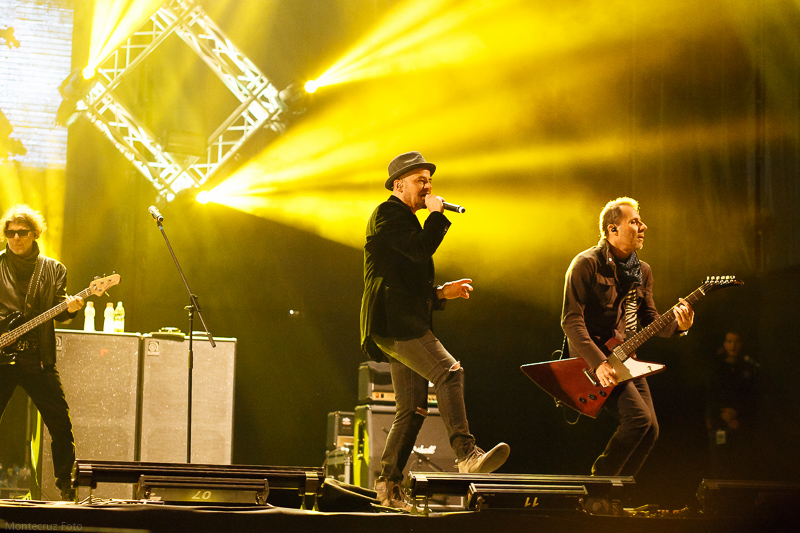
- Titãs live at the Montevideo Rock 2018. From left to right: Branco Mello, Sérgio Britto and Tony Bellotto. Session members Mario Fabre and Beto Lee are not seen in the picture.

Background information
- Origin: São Paulo, São Paulo, Brazil
- Genres: Post-punk, alternative rock, new wave, pop rock, punk rock. ska
- Years active: 1981–present
- Labels: WEA, Sony BMG, Som Livre, Universal
- Spinoffs: Cabine C, Kleiderman, Os Infernais
- Members: Branco Mello; Sérgio Britto; Tony Bellotto
- Past members: Ciro Pessoa; André Jung; Arnaldo Antunes; Marcelo Fromer; Nando Reis; Paulo Miklos; Charles Gavin
- Website: titas.net

Titãs (pronounced [t͡ʃiˈtɐ̃s]; lit. 'Titans') are a Brazilian rock band from São Paulo. Though they primarily are classified as a rock band, the band have also experimented with genres such as new wave, punk rock, ska, grunge, MPB and electronic music throughout their career.

Titãs's initial nine member lineup was composed of vocalists Branco Mello, Ciro Pessoa, and Arnaldo Antunes, guitarists Marcelo Fromer and Tony Bellotto, keyboardist and vocalist Sérgio Britto, multi instrumentalist and vocalist Paulo Miklos, bassist and vocalist Nando Reis, and drummer André Jung, with each member (except for Jung, Fromer, and initially Bellotto), alternating between lead and backing vocals. By 1985, both Pessoa and Jung had left the band, with Charles Gavin replacing Jung shortly after the release of the band's debut album Titãs.

Following a string of critically acclaimed albums, most notably Cabeça Dinossauro (1986), and Jesus não Tem Dentes no País dos Banguelas (1987), Antunes left the band in 1992 to pursue a solo career. The band continued as a seven piece, releasing Acústico MTV in 1997 and Volume Dois in 1998, both of which were commercially successful. Fromer died in 2001 after being hit by a motorist, and Reis left the band a year later. Gavin and Miklos left in 2010 and 2016 respectively, turning the band into a trio. From 2023 to 2024, Reis, Gavin, Miklos, and Antunes briefly rejoined the band as touring members.

Titãs are one of the most successful rock bands in Brazil, having sold more than 6.3 million albums as of 2005. The band's songs have been covered by several well-known Brazilian artists and international singers. They were awarded a Latin Grammy in 2009 and have won four Imprensa Trophies for Best Band.

== History ==
=== 1981-1982: Background and previous activities ===
Most of the band members (except for guitarist Tony Bellotto, who came from Assis to live in São Paulo while studying Architecture in Santos; and drummer Charles Gavin) met at Colégio Equipe in São Paulo at the end of the seventies. The first to be enrolled was vocalist/keyboardist Sérgio Britto, followed by vocalists Arnaldo Antunes and Paulo Miklos and lastly vocalists Branco Mello, Ciro Pessoa and Nando Reis and guitarist Marcelo Fromer.

Most of the members were in other projects prior to the band's formation. Antunes and Miklos were part of Aguilar & Banda Performática; Reis was the percussionist and crooner in Sossega Leão; Mello, Fromer and Bellotto formed Trio Mamão. Fromer was also part of the band Maldade with Fernando Salém, Beto Freore and Macalé (unrelated to Jards) and Reis was a member of Camarões with Cao Hamburger and Paulo Monteiro, among others; the band played "O Cheiro da Beterraba" (written by Reis's cousin Vange Leonel) on the album A Feira da Vila, with finalists of the second Festival da Vila Madalena (in the same album, Miklos sang "Desenho", which he wrote with Antunes).

=== 1982-1982: Formation and first shows ===
After watching performances by Novos Baianos, Alceu Valença, Caetano Veloso and Gilberto Gil at the school's courtyard, the members started a band and recorded a tape with pick-up lines. The group's initial lineup originally included members such as Nuno Ramos, who would later become an artist.

Their first live performance was in 1981 at an event at the Mário de Andrade Library called A Idade da Pedra Jovem (The Young Stone Age). The group presented a pop opera centered around Johnny Cristell, who was supposed to be some sort of Brazilian Tommy. In this first version of the band, Miklos and Britto alternated between bass and keyboards, Reis played the drums, Bellotto and Fromer played the guitars, and there were six lead vocalists (including Antunes and Pessoa) and five backing vocalists (still not including Mello, who was getting married at the time).

After a trip to Rio de Janeiro, where he closely followed the rise of his then brother-in-law Billy Forghieri's band Blitz, Pessoa suggested to Bellotto that they officially formed the Titãs do Iê-Iê. The name has its roots in their early sessions, at Bellotto's parent's home library, where there were books such as Titãs da Ciência, Titãs do Esporte, Titãs da Literatura (Science Titans, Sports Titans, Literature Titans), among others.

Their first shows happened on 15 and 16 October 1982, at Sesc Pompeia. It was described by Mello as a "damned session" due to the session being held late at night. (after midnight). During the band's initial sessions, the band's attire included make-up and colorful suits. The first line-up under their official name had nine members, six of them being vocalists: Arnaldo Antunes, Branco Mello and Ciro Pessoa were solely vocalists; Paulo Miklos sang and shared the bass with Nando Reis and the keyboards with Sérgio Britto; Britto sang and played the keyboards; Reis played the bass and sang; Tony Bellotto and Marcelo Fromer played the electric and the acoustic guitar respectively and André Jung played the drums. The nine-member band would usually go on stage with about 30 original songs.

After these initial performances at Sesc, the group embarked in a city tour around alternative venues such as Lira Paulistana, Hong Kong (by Júlio Barroso), Napalm and the gay bar Village Station. In the meantime, they would distribute some demo tapes, some of which ended up in the hands of Lulu Santos, Liminha, Billy Forghieri and the program Fábrica do Som. Both live and in studio, they were playing later hits such as "Bichos Escrotos", "Marvin", "Sonho Com Você" and "Sonífera Ilha".

=== 1984-1985: Departures of Ciro Pessoa and André Jung and first album ===
In 1984, Pessoa left the band, unwilling to exchange the local night clubs for popular TV shows. He also had a hard time with Jung, whom he deemed incapable of playing rock'n'roll; another version of the story behind his split with the group is that the tensions between the two culminated with him being asked to leave.

Soon after, the band signed with the WEA label to record their first album, Titãs, produced by Pena Schimdt, and featuring songs previously recorded with Pessoas's vocals. By then the dropped the "iê-iê" part of their name because it was usually mispronounced as "iê-iê-iê" by speakers or simply ignored. In order to sign the group, the label had to agree not to release any singles before the album, because the group didn't want to be represented by a single song. Although poorly promoted and hardly a success, the band spawned their first hit: "Sonífera Ilha", later recorded by singer Moraes Moreira. Following the release, Reis briefly left the band, willing to focus on another group he played at (salsa act Sossega Leão, in which he was a percussionist and crooner), but two weeks later he changed his mind and was accepted back.

After a show in Rio de Janeiro during the New Year celebrations from 1984 to 1985, Titãs announced to André Jung that they would go on with another drummer. They chose Charles Gavin, who had just left Ira! and was rehearsing with RPM. Mello would later admit that Jung was isolated within the band; the drummer, however, defined his firing during New Year as "cruelty" and "stab in the back". Two days later, back in São Paulo sooner than planned, he ended up invited by roommate Nasi to join Ira!, from where Gavin was coming.

In 1985, their second album, Televisão, produced by Lulu Santos, was released with tighter arrangements than their debut album. Not only was the title track a great hit, the album was more heavily promoted than the first one and brought more opportunities to the group. Still, it sold below expectations.

=== 1985-1989: Into the spotlight ===
Around the mid eighties, the band joined the circuit of TV presentations, including Chacrinha. They would sometimes perform five times a day and wouldn't always be able to have all members together, because their cars would sometimes get lost amidst the complex logistics.

In November 1985, Tony Bellotto and Arnaldo Antunes were arrested for heroin traffic and transportation. It is considered by the band as the climax of their first crisis, started with the first two albums low sales. Also, the episode made so much of an impact in the band that the next album, Cabeça Dinossauro, released in June 1986, contained a lot of tracks criticizing public institutions ("Estado Violência" and "Polícia"), as well as other "pillars" of the Brazilian society and indeed society in general ("Igreja" and "Família"). The heavy and punk-influenced rhythms and the forceful lyrics, characteristic of the band in this phase, are fully represented in this album which is considered by the critics one of the best works of the group and one of the landmarks of the Brazilian rock.

Jesus não Tem Dentes no País dos Banguelas, released in the end of 1987, continued in the same vein as the previous album in tracks like "Nome aos Bois", "Lugar Nenhum" and "Desordem", however adding samplers in tracks like "Corações e Mentes", "Todo Mundo quer Amor", "Comida" and "Diversão". After some international performances, the band recorded some of their hits in live Montreux Festival and released Go Back in 1988. The biggest hit to come out of Go Back was a live version of the song "Marvin" which is a re-invented version of "Patches" by Clarence Carter made famous by Elvis. Still in 1988, they guest performed on the song "Tempo" (written by Antunes and Miklos) of Sandra de Sá's 1988 self-titled album.

The producer Liminha (a former adjunct member of Os Mutantes) was always an important associate of the band since Cabeça Dinossauro, and this association arrived to its climax in Õ Blésq Blom (1989), one of the most popular productions of the band by that time. Some of the prominence tracks: "Miséria", "Flores", "O Pulso" and "32 Dentes". One of the prominent features of this work was the special guest appearance of a couple of improvisors, called Mauro and Quitéria, discovered by the band at a beach in Recife.

=== 1990-1995: Antunes' departure and Jack Endino era ===
The band had arrived to a decisive point in its history and the next album, Tudo ao Mesmo Tempo Agora marks a strong yaw at the musicians' style, searching for heavier, alternative and authorial sound, along with scatological lyrics. The members themselves produced the album.

Unhappy with the new direction taken by the band, Antunes left for a solo career on 15 December 1992, although he would continue to write occasional songs with them. The following album, Titanomaquia, in 1993, continued the previous work in a way, with heavy instrumentation and aggressive lyrics, only now produced by Jack Endino, producer of important bands like Nirvana, which contributed for the grunge-influenced sound.

In 1995 the band decided to take a break for one year during which many of its members decided to work solo. Miklos and Reis released their debut solo efforts, Paulo Miklos and 12 de Janeiro, respectively; Britto and Mello formed Kleiderman; and Bellotto wrote his first book, Bellini e a Esfinge.

The band released Domingo in the end of 1995, again with production by Endino.

=== 1997-1999: Acoustic and tribute efforts ===
Titãs, as depicted in their MTV Unplugged album. Standing, from left to right: Marcello Fromer, Paulo Miklos, Branco Mello and Nando Reis. Sitting, from left to right: Sergio Britto, Charles Gavin and Tony Bellotto.

The band's commercial peak was reached once they released the commemorative work Acústico MTV (MTV Unplugged), their most successful album to date, released in 1997, which sold 1,7 million copies. Recorded Live, Acústico MTV not only revisited their career up to that point but it also had a song which became an immediate hit named "Pra dizer Adeus" (originally from Televisão). It also had a number of guest performers, including former member Arnaldo Antunes.

This record was followed by Volume Dois (1998), modeled in the same way of their unplugged album, only recorded in studio; and cover album As Dez Mais (1999), which did not sell well and was panned by critics, despite "Aluga-se" and "Pelados em Santos" becoming hits.

Also in 1999, the band embarked on a collaborative tour with Os Paralamas do Sucesso, another successful Brazilian rock band, and a live, collaborative record followed: Titãs & Paralamas Juntos ao Vivo.

=== 2001-2009: Fromer's death, Reis' departure, documentary and Latin Grammy ===
On 11 June 2001 Marcelo Fromer was hit by a motorcycle in São Paulo and died two days later of Brain death. It was a severe blow to the band, which started recording their new album the day after. A Melhor Banda de Todos os Tempos da Última Semana was released at the end of 2001 and brought "Epitáfio" as the prominence song and the title track as the first single.

Regarding the death of Marcelo, this statement was published on 20 June 2001 at Titãs official site:

Despite the pain that Marcelo's absence has caused, we have decided to enter the studio to record this record that we created and arranged together with him, about which we were - and still are - enthusiastic. We feel that the best way to overcome this difficult moment is to continue with what always held us together: the music. Once again, thanks for all the support and kindness from fans and friends.

In the following year, the band saw the departure of vocalist and bassist Nando Reis, who has since lead a successful solo career (including songs penned for other artists) fronting his own band Nando Reis e os Infernais. He announced his parting on 9 September 9, 2002, giving "thought incompatibility" as a reason and also saying Fromer's and his close friend Cássia Eller's deaths left him very upset:

My decision to leave the group is uniquely and exclusively due to a thought incompatibility regarding the future of the preparation of what would be our next album. For believing that such work requires the total dedication that for personal reasons I cannot offer, we agreed it would be best for me to leave at the start of the preparation and the sessions. I do it with deep regrets in my heart since in no moment I ever thought this would happen.

In a 2012 interview, he would say he did not feel ready for the studio following his friends' deaths and three consecutive, exhausting tours.

The band hired the bassist Lee Marcucci (from Rádio Táxi) to play in their first album without Reis, Como Estão Vocês? (How Are You?). With self-help hits as "Enquanto Houver Sol", questions on relevance remain on Titãs' side, which faced declining sales and the ageing of their fanbase.

In 2005, they released another MTV-branded album, only this time in a non-acoustic live performance. This album generated a new hit for the group, called "Vossa Excelência", that basically criticizes the hypocrisy and lack of care from politicians, thus bringing the band back to its roots.

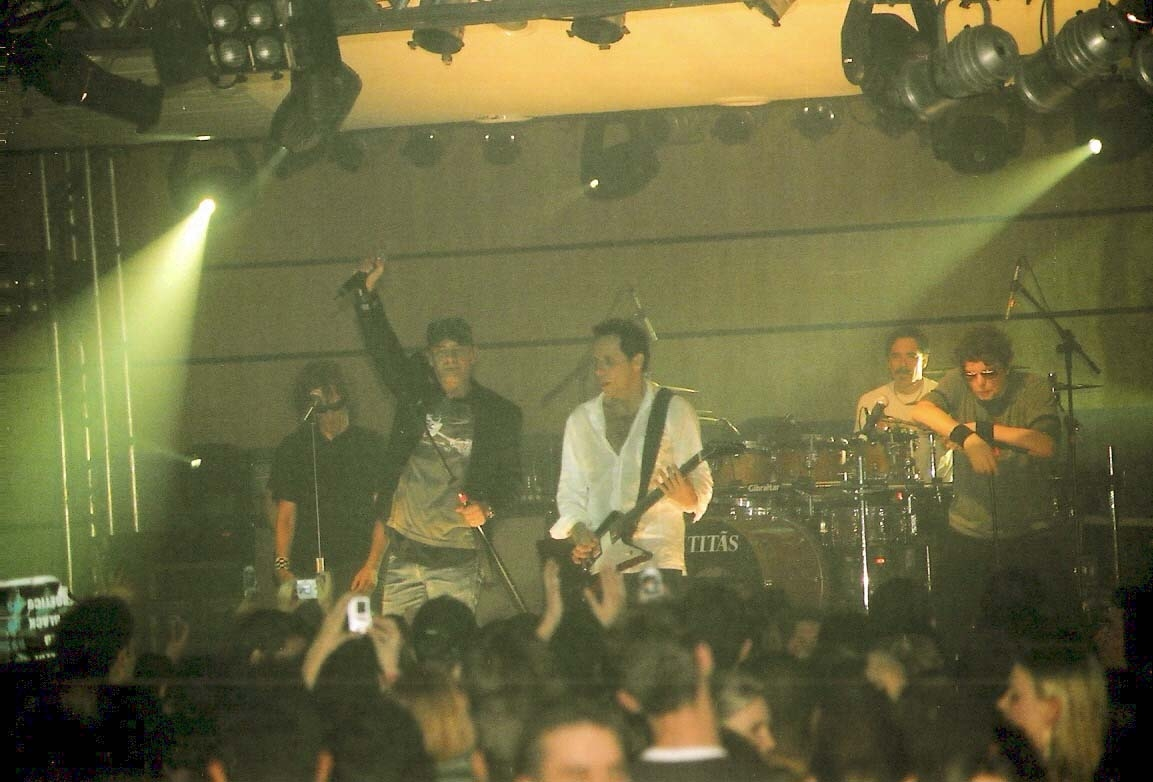
Titãs performing live in Foz do Iguaçu, Paraná, in 2006

On 18 February 2006, Titãs opened the Rolling Stones free concert at Copacabana beach, Rio de Janeiro for an audience of some 1.5 million people.

In 2007, the band started a tour, entitled 25 Anos de Rock (25 Years of Rock), again joining Os Paralamas do Sucesso to celebrate the 25th anniversary of both bands, as well as the 25th anniversary of the rising of 1980s Brazilian rock bands. The two line-ups played together most of the time on the shows, presenting also some invited musicians, like Arnaldo Antunes, Andreas Kisser and Dado Villa-Lobos. The concert in Rio de Janeiro, which took place on 26 January 2008, was recorded and filmed. The resulting collaborative CD and DVD were released five months after, titled Paralamas e Titãs Juntos e Ao Vivo .

The band released a documentary of the 25 years of their career. The documentary features 90 minutes of images collected since the beginning of the band, including recording of albums, live performances, and more. It is titled Titãs - A Vida Até Parece Uma Festa.

For most of 2008 and early 2009, the band recorded their 13th studio album, the Latin Grammy-winner Sacos Plásticos. The album was released on 3 June 2009, through Arsenal Music. The producer, Rick Bonadio, had already worked with artists such as Fresno and NX Zero.

The first single from the album was "Antes de Você" ("Before You"), and it received radio airplay on 7 May. It was featured at the Caras & Bocas (current 19pm Rede Globo telenovela) soundtrack. The second single was "Porque Eu Sei que É Amor" (Because I Know It's Love) which was featured in Cama de Gato (a Brazilian telenovela that also features the song "Pelo Avesso" as opening theme, from their 2003 album Como Estão Vocês?) and reached #16 at Brasil Hot 100 Airplay

In an interview to Jornal da Tarde, and regarding the music of the new album, Bonadio stated:

They have an endless talent. I don't want to make just another album of Titãs, don't want it to be similar to the others. I ended up proposing some electronic stuff, and they accepted it immediately. There are songs with no drums, songs with various electronic elements. That's an example of how to become mature and keep this professional conscience. They are ethic with their sound, but are not dumb.

=== 2010-2016: Gavin's departure, 30th birthday, Nheengatu ===
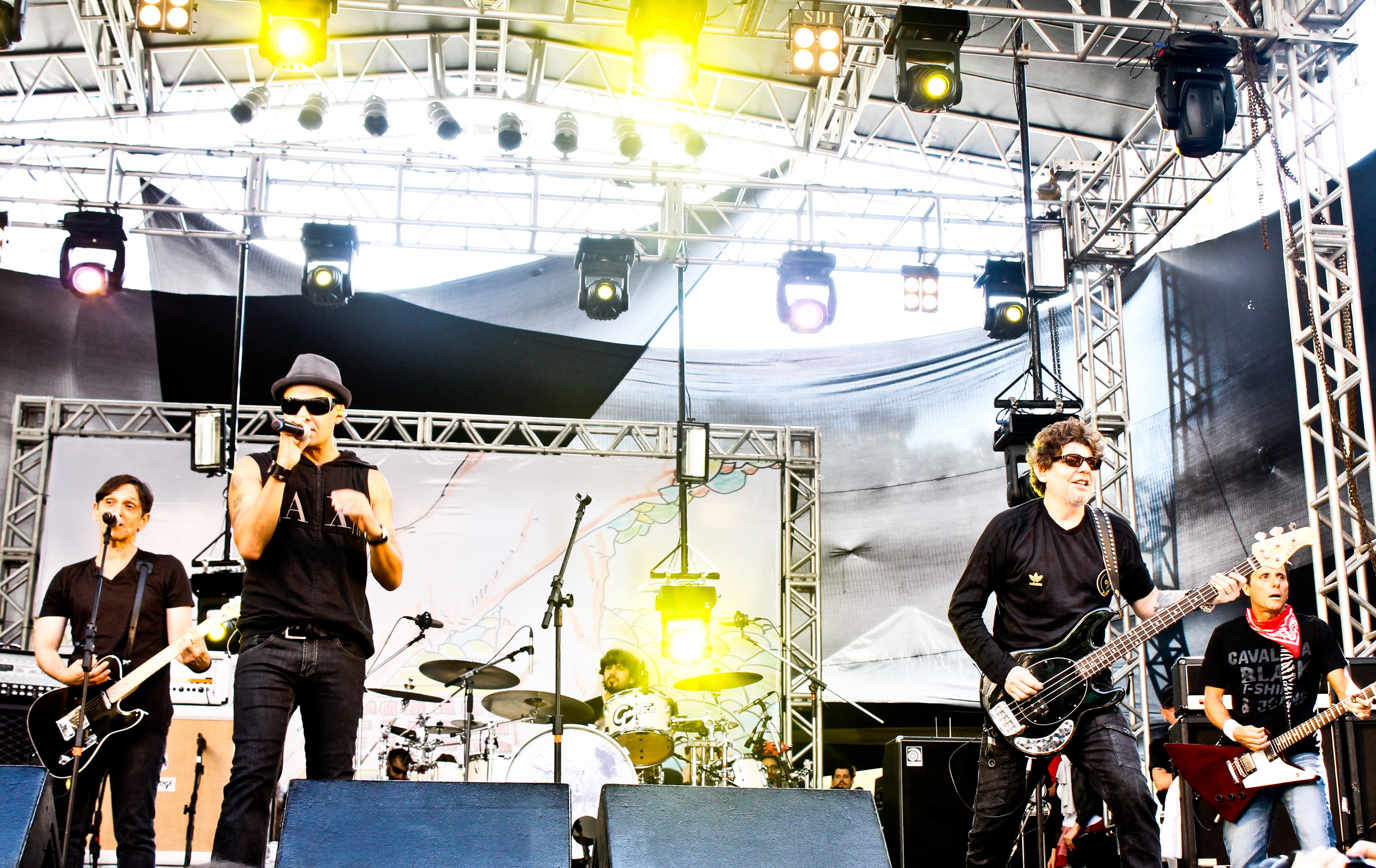
Titãs live in 2012 as a quartet plus session drummer Mário Fabre

On 12 February 2010, Titãs announced in their official website that drummer Charles Gavin would leave the band for personal reasons. Gavin later stated that he was physically and mentally exhausted because of the tours and album releases. The quartet continued their performances of the Sacos Plásticos tour with drummer Mario Fabre, who has remained with the band since then as a session member. Fabre was suggested by Gavin himself. When asked about the status of Fabre in the band, Bellotto explained that "he is the official drummer! He's the drummer of Titãs! But he isn't one of Titãs, because our history began long ago, at Greek mythology... "

During an interview, vocalist and keyboardist Sérgio Britto said the band was planning to start recording a new album in 2011. Nothing else was said since then, until March 2013, when they revealed they were starting to work on a new album, to be released in the second half of 2013. The album would be self-produced, and, according to Britto, it would be "a mixture between Cabeça Dinossauro and Õ Blésq Blom".

In January 2012, the band announced a live performance in company of ex-members Arnaldo Antunes, Nando Reis and Charles Gavin. The show would celebrate the 30-year career of the band, and would include guest performances of other friends of the band, and there were plans for a DVD release. According to Miklos:

We are going to call ex-Titãs and other great friends and contemporaries to a great party. Everyone who was part of our history will be invited. We cannot give more details, because we need to concatenate schedules to turn this dream of ours into reality.

The reunion took place on 6 October 2012, in São Paulo. For the first time since 1997's Acústico MTV, the seven original members of the band reunited for a one-night performance. According to Bellotto:

We could savor their presence, since the backstage, during the sessions, until the show. It was very nice to remember of all that and to see that, even if they have their solo careers, they are with us.

The band gathered in Reis' house to discuss the reunion - it was the first time since Fromer's death that all seven members met.

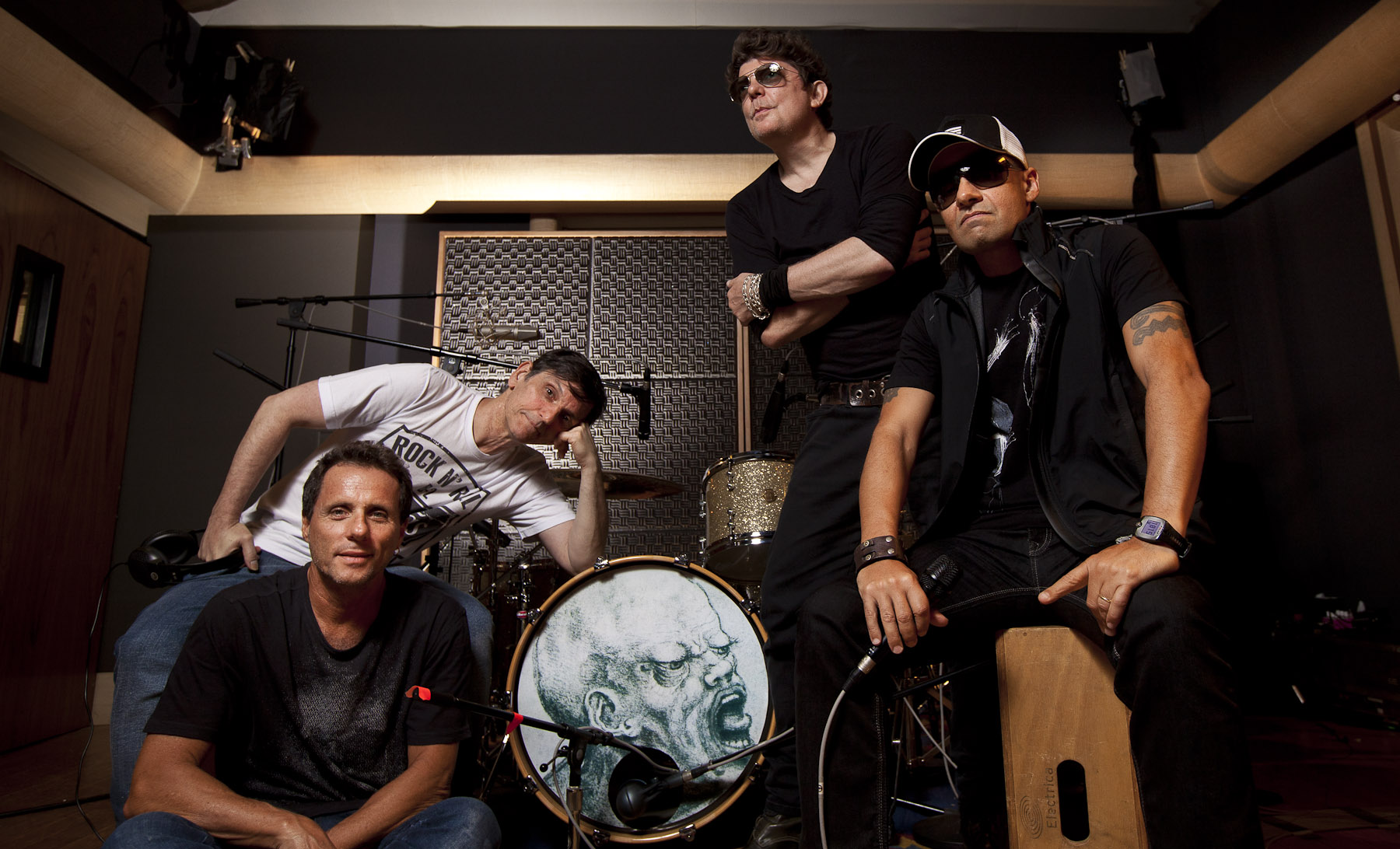
Titãs as of 2013. From left to right: Tony Bellotto, Paulo Miklos, Branco Mello, and Sergio Britto.

In 2013, Titãs performed new songs live, part of their Titãs Inédito (Titãs Unseen) tour. They were planning to begin work on a new album in April or May 2014. Miklos said the album was likely to be "heavy, dirty and mean". Later, Britto confirmed that the album would be released in early May and that the band was already recording songs for it, but it was yet to be titled. In March, radio Globo FM announced that the album would be actually released in April and would feature 14 tracks. On 16 April, the band announced that the album was ready and would be really released in May, via Som Livre records. On 28 April, they announced the title, cover and release date for the album, which is called Nheengatu and was released on 12 May. In August 2015, they released Nheengatu ao Vivo, a live album and DVD with songs from their Nheengatu Tour.

In February 2016, they opened a Rolling Stones Brazilian show for a second and third time, this time at the Morumbi Stadium in São Paulo, on two different dates.

=== 2016-2018: Miklos' departure and rock opera ===
On 11 July 2016, vocalist, guitarist and founding member Paulo Miklos announced he would leave the band to focus on his personal projects. He was then replaced by session member Beto Lee, son of Brazilian notorious rock singer Rita Lee.

His first recording with the band is a version of "Pro Dia Nascer Feliz", originally by Barão Vermelho, for the soundtrack of the 24th season of Malhação, a Rede Globo series. With Lee's inclusion, the band recovered some old songs for its live setlists, including Titanomaquia's "Será Que É Disso Que Eu Necessito?" and "Nem Sempre se Pode Ser Deus". They also started to have Bellotto sing in some songs.

Also in 2016, the band announced a new album for a possible 2017 release. According to Bellotto, it would be a rock opera, and the band intended to enter the studio until mid-2017 so the album could be released in the year's second half. Drawing inspiration from albums such as The Who's Quadrophenia and Green Day's American Idiot, the over 30-track rock opera would have its story written by Hugo Possolo and Marcelo Rubens Paiva. By April 2017, Mello said a handful of tracks were ready.

Also in April, the band started a tour called "Uma Noite no Teatro" (A Night at the Theater) with a show that was also the inaugurating event of Shopping Villa-Lobos' theater Opus. The tour included three new songs: "Me Estuprem" (Rape Me), about sexual harassment and rape; "12 Flores Amarelas" (12 Yellow Flowers); and "A Festa" (The Party). By that time, none of them were expected to be featured in the band's new album. On 23 September, however, the band performed them again during their show at the Rock in Rio 7, and this time they were announced as part of the new project. In December 2017, they announced that they had already started recording the album and that it would be released via Universal Music. On 31 January, they announced that the opera rock would be released in early 2018 and that its title would be Doze Flores Amarelas.

In May 2018, after the Doze Flores Amarelas DVD had been recorded, Mello was diagnosed with a tumor in his larynx, which forced him to step down from the band activities for three months. Lee Marcucci, who worked for the band as a session musician from 2002 to 2009, stepped in to replace him.

=== 2018-present: Titãs Trio Acústico, return to BMG and Reunion Tour ===
From 2019 on, they did a series of acoustic shows in order to celebrate 20 years of Acústico MTV, which was not possible in 2017 since they were focusing on Doze Flores Amarelas. The tour was named "Trio Acústico" ("Acoustic Trio") and was conciliated with the Doze Flores Amarelas promotional tour and a third tour called "Enquanto Houver Sol", this one in an electric format and involving songs from many eras of the group.

In 2020, the band announced it had recorded a studio version of the project and that it would be released as three EPs, under the collective title Titãs Trio Acústico. A re-recording of "Sonífera Ilha" was released as a single and video on 20 March, when it was also announced that the EPs would be released starting in April via BMG, the label to which then returned by the end of 2019.

On 5 May 2020, original founding member Ciro Pessoa died following complications from a cancer and COVID-19.

In October 2020, the remaining members were featured in a cover of "Comida" (from Jesus não Tem Dentes no País dos Banguelas) released by singer Elza Soares. The version was originally planned for her 2019 album Planeta Fome, but she chose to save the song for later and decided to release it at the album's first anniversary and also to celebrate its nomination for the Latin Grammy Award.

In January 2022, former member Nando Reis said he has rejected for now the possibility of taking part in the band's 40th anniversary tour, due to him having "one idea" and them "another".

In 2023, Titãs started the tour "Encontro: Todos Ao Mesmo Tempo Agora" which reunites the former members Arnaldo Antunes, Charles Gavin, Nando Reis and Paulo Miklos. The tour is allusive to the band's 40th Anniversary.

In 2025, Bellotto announced that he would be temporarily stepping down from touring following the discovery of a cancerous tumor in his pancreas. He was briefly replaced by guitarist Alexandre de Orio.

== Band members ==
Current members

- Branco Mello – vocals (1981–present; on hiatus: 2018, 2021–2022) bass (2002–present) occasional guitars (2016–present)
- Sérgio Britto – vocals, keyboards, piano, guitars (1981–present) bass (2009–present)
- Tony Bellotto – guitars (1981–present; on hiatus 2025) vocals (2016–present)

Former members

- Ciro Pessoa – vocals (1981–1984; died 2020)
- André Jung – drums, percussion (1981–1985)
- Arnaldo Antunes – vocals (1981–1992)
- Marcelo Fromer – guitars (1981–2001; his death)
- Nando Reis – vocals, bass, occasional guitars (1981–2002)
- Paulo Miklos – vocals, saxophone, banjo, mandolin, guitars, harmoncia, occasional keyboards and bass (1981–2016)
- Charles Gavin – drums, percussion (1985–2010)

Current touring and session musicians

- Mario Fabre – drums, percussion, backing vocals (2010–present)
- Beto Lee – guitars, backing and occasional lead vocals (2016–present)

Former touring and session musicians

- Liminha – guitars, bass, percussion (1986–1991, 1997)
- Emerson Villani – guitars, backing vocals (1998, 2001–2006)
- Marco Lobo – percussion (2001–2003)
- Lee Marcucci – bass (2002–2009; 2018)
- André Fonseca – guitars, backing vocals (2006–2009; 2014)
- Caio Góes Neves – bass (2021–2024)
- Tiago Adorno – guitars, backing vocals (2022–2023)
- Alexandre de Orio – guitars (2025)

Timeline

== Discography ==
=== Studio albums ===
Year	Album	Label
1984	Titãs	WEA
1985	Televisão	WEA
1986	Cabeça Dinossauro	WEA
1987	Jesus não Tem Dentes no País dos Banguelas	WEA
1988	Go Back	WEA
1989	Õ Blésq Blom	WEA
1991	Tudo ao Mesmo Tempo Agora	WEA
1993	Titanomaquia	WEA
1995	Domingo	WEA
1997	Acústico MTV	WEA
1998	Volume Dois	WEA
1999	As Dez Mais	WEA
2001	A Melhor Banda de Todos os Tempos da Última Semana	BMG
2003	Como Estão Vocês?	BMG
2005	MTV ao Vivo	BMG
2009	Sacos Plásticos	Universal Music
2012	Cabeça Dinossauro ao Vivo 2012	Universal Music
2014	Nheengatu	Som Livre
2015	Nheengatu ao Vivo	Som Livre
2018	Doze Flores Amarelas	Universal Music
2021	Titãs Trio Acústico	BMG
2022	Olho Furta-Cor	Midas Music

== Awards ==
- Latin Grammy Award – "Best Brazilian Rock Album" with Sacos Plásticos (2009))
- Troféu Imprensa – "Best band" (1987, 1988, 1997, 1998) and "Best song" ("Pra Dizer Adeus", 1997)
- Prêmio Bizz (by Revista Bizz) – "Best album" (Cabeça Dinossauro (1986), Jesus Não Tem Dentes No País Dos Banguelas (1987), Õ Blésq Blom (1989), Volume Dois (1998)) "Best band" (1987, 1988, 1989, 1997, 1998), and "Best show" (Titãs – Volume 2 – Ao Vivo, 1998)
- Prêmio Multishow de Música Brasileira (by Multishow) – "Best band" (1998, 1999, 2002), "Best album" (Titãs – Acústico MTV (1998), Volume Dois (1999)), "Best show" (Titãs – Acústico MTV, 1998), "Best song" (É Preciso Saber Viver, 1999) and "Best instrumentalist" (Tony Bellotto, 2000)
- MTV Video Music Brasil – "Best videoclip" (Flores (1990), Será Que é Disso Que eu Necessito? (1993), "Best rock clip", "Best Rock Video", "Video Of The Year" and "Viewer's Choice" (Epitáfio, 2002), "Musical Movie/Documentary of the Year" (Titãs – A Vida Até Parece Uma Festa, 2009)
- TIM Music Award Best band (Pop/Rock category) (2004)
