= Kleiderman =

Brazilian punk rock project

- Origin: São Paulo, São Paulo, Brazil
- Genres: Punk rock
- Years active: 1994
- Label: Banguela Records
- Members: Branco Mello; Sérgio Britto; Roberta Parisi

Kleiderman was a short-lived punk rock band from São Paulo, Brazil. The band was formed by Branco Mello, Sérgio Britto (both members of Brazilian rock band Titãs) and Roberta Parisi.

The band was initially named Richard Clayderman after the pianist, but the name was later changed to avoid problems with the label. In the album cover (signed by Fernando Zarif), the name "Richard" is covered by a bandaged.

== Discography ==
The only album by the band was released on 1 December 1994 and was titled Con el mundo a mis pies. Until August 1997, it had sold 6,500 copies. It was released via Banguela Records, co-managed by Mello.

=== Con el mundo a mis pies ===
All tracks are written by Branco Mello, Sérgio Britto, Roberta Parisi, except when noted.

| No. | Title | Length |
|---|---|---|
| 1. | "O amor é uma coisa feia" (Love is something ugly Fernando Zarif, Branco Mello, Sérgio Britto, Roberta Parisi) | 1:31 |
| 2. | "Let me be your nightmare" (Fernando Zarif, Branco Mello, Sérgio Britto, Roberta Parisi, Sérgio Pamplona) | 1:54 |
| 3. | "Nem mãe, nem puta" (Not mother, nor whore (Branco Mello, Sérgio Britto, Roberta Parisi, Habib Takla)) | 1:28 |
| 4. | "All rock bands" | 2:44 |
| 5. | "Dracula's tea bag" | 1:29 |
| 6. | "Con el mundo a mis pies" (With the world at my feet) | 2:25 |
| 7. | "Eu vou ficar dopado" (I'm going to get doped) | 1:31 |
| 8. | "O colecionador" (The collector) | 1:58 |
| 9. | "Testosterona" (Testosterone) | 2:15 |
| 10. | "Roberta" | 0:56 |
| 11. | "Plastic" | 2:13 |
| 12. | "Não quero mudar" (Don't wanna change) | 2:19 |
| 13. | "Lick my dirt" | 2:51 |
| 14. | "Se eu sei que me faz mal" (If I know it's unhealthy) | 2:08 |
| 15. | "Êxtase" (Ecstasy) | 2:29 |
| 16. | "Nojo" (Disgust) | 1:21 |
| 17. | "Get me higher" | 3:55 |
