= Tudo ao Mesmo Tempo Agora =

Tudo Ao Mesmo Tempo Agora

Studio album by Titãs
- Released: November 1991
- Recorded: June–July 1991 at a home studio in Carapicuíba, São Paulo, Brazil
- Genres: Alternative rock, punk rock, grunge
- Length: 38:38
- Label: WEA
- Producer: Titãs

Titãs chronology
| Õ Blésq Blom (1989) | Tudo Ao Mesmo Tempo Agora (1991) | Titanomaquia (1993) |

Tudo Ao Mesmo Tempo Agora (Everything at the Same Time Now) is the sixth album by Brazilian rock band Titãs, released on 23 September 1991 via Warner and produced by the band itself, which also, for the first time, is credited as a whole for the songwriting and arrangements, instead of crediting individual members.

It is also their last album to feature vocalist Arnaldo Antunes, who left the group the year after. It marks another musical shift for the band, which now returned to a more straightforward rock with aggressive and even scatological lyrics, as in "Isso Para Mim É Perfume" and "Saia de Mim". Due to such lyrics, the album did not immediately please critics nor fans, who showed little enthusiasm towards it.

== Production ==
=== Context and recordings ===
The album came after a fruitful period for the band, which had released the successful Õ Blésq Blom and returned from a performance at the second edition of Rock in Rio.

The eight members decided to depart from the big and dense productions of their previous albums and adopted an approach more centered around rawer songs, shows in smaller venues and independent music.

After rehearsing at guitarist Marcelo Fromer's house, the band gathered between June and July 1991 in an improvised studio on Invernada Street, in Granja Viana (western Greater São Paulo) to record the album "live" and semi-professionally. After a sequence of works with Liminha, the group self-produced the effort due to scheduling conflicts. Without a professional to direct the work, the group dwelled into self-indulgence and self-serving and decided to do everything exactly as they wanted it. They even considered creating an artificial language for the album lyrics.

Drummer Charles Gavin compared using a house (instead of a professional studio) to record the album to similar experiences by Deep Purple and the Rolling Stones, who have recorded, respectively, in a castle and in hotel rooms.

=== Lyrics ===
According to vocalist and bassist Nando Reis, the decision to credit the whole band for the songwriting was not consensual. He himself says he would have done it differently, and he also believes this may have contributed to Antunes leaving the band later. However, Reis believes it is possible to identify each author's "touch" in the songs, such as Antunes on "Uma Coisa de Cada Vez" and keyboardist/vocalist Sérgio Britto on "O Fácil É o Certo".

The track "Flat Cemitério Apartamento" originally contained a verse which questioned: "What if Knorr released a rabbit-flavored dehydrated broth with new seasonings?". "Clitóris", according to its author Reis, is a manifestation of his habit of creating associations between symbols of the Church and body parts (in this case, he rhymes "clitóris" (klitˈɔɾiʃ) with "genuflexório" (ʒenufleksˈɔɾju). "Isso Para Mim É Perfume" was created by Reis to express that when two people love each other deeply, they are willing to share all their intimacies, including defecation, which explains its chorus, which says: "Amor, eu quero te ver cagar" (Honey, I want to see you shit".

=== Cover ===
The album cover was designed by artist Fernando Zarif, using images from the Barsa encyclopedia. the booklet features radiographic images of members making poses (namely vocalists Antunes, Paulo Miklos and Branco Mello) obtained at Miklos's father's dentist clinic in downtown São Paulo.

== Release and promotion ==
According to Reis, the band released the album shortly before its promotional tour and they didn't hold any press conferences to discuss the new effort with journalists. According to him, the band decided to do so because they were disappointed with what they saw as "superficial" analysis of their previous output, which, still according to them, derived from reporters' hurry to publish scoops. However, he thinks this silence backfired and caused the press to see it as a mere sign of arrogance, which raised tensions between the band and the journalists.

The album was released at an initial price of Cr$ 3,500.00-4,500.00. Despite the poor critical reception, it was among the best-selling albums of the second week of October, according to a research by InformEstado (from O Estado de S. Paulo) losing only to three international releases (Use Your Illusion I and II, by Guns N' Roses, and Slave to the Grind, by Skid Row).

As part of the album's promotional efforts, MTV aired on 29 September 1991 a 30-minute special homonymous to the album, produced by Conspiração Filmes and directed by Arthur Fontes and Lula Buarque. The special featured images of the album's creation, alternating with making-of images and testimonials of the members.

A video for "Saia de Mim" was going to be aired on TV Globo's Fantástico, but was ultimately aborted due to its scatological lyrics.

In 2021, Reis said that, during a show of the band in the countryside of São Paulo state, one member of the audience threw a dead rabbit onto the stage. The shocking image was, for him, representative of the public shift the band would witness as they changed their sound for a more aggressive one.

== Reception ==
=== Critical reception ===
Professional ratings
Review scores
| Source | Rating |
|---|---|
| Allmusic | 2.5/5 stars |
| O Estado de S. Paulo | unfavorable |
| Jornal do Brasil | mixed |

Writing for O Estado de S. Paulo, Marcel Plasse considered it the worst post-Cabeça Dinossauro Titãs album. He praised the instrumental parts, which he called a "cocktail of Rolling Stones, Led Zeppelin, Doors, Faith No More, Bad Brains, U2 and Brazilian punk". However, he said vocals were too clean and resulted in a "disaster mix". He also criticized the lyrics, pointing them as repetitive (he even counted how many times certain words were repeated throughout every track) and associating them with concretism, a movement that he dismissed as "foolishness".

On Jornal do Brasil, Aponean Rodrigues praised the heavy instrumental parts, saying that "the guitars stand out in dense layers with discret keyboard parts in the background, and the drums have a led zeppelinian presence as it pleases Gavin". For him, that could be an attempt to reach a heavy metal market in which fellow Brazilian bands Sepultura and Viper were already venturing themselves. On the other hand, he said "the lyrics of the other songs form a chain of sentences that give the impression that they were imagined solely to follow the songs. It wouldn't make much of a difference if they had been randomly mixed. The result of automatic writing would be perhaps better".

Also on Jornal do Brasil, in the "Em Questão" section, Jamari França praised the album's heaviness and originality, electing it as the only album (aside from Zé Ninguém, by Biquíni Cavadão) from that time that "cause a stir". However, he criticized the lyrics, which he considered excessively scatological and similar to mere sketches. In the same section, David Trompowsky used the lyrics to ironically criticize the band, saying the album is "perfect" for people who believe "the easy thing is the right thing" (a pun on the track "O Fácil É o Certo', which translates as "the easy thing is the right thing") and that the band was very honest when they said "Eu não sei fazer música/Mas eu faço/Eu não sei cantar as músicas que faço/Mas eu canto" (verses from "Eu Não Sei Fazer Música" which translate as "I can't write music/But I do it/I can't sing the songs I write/But I do it"). He also said the album is adequate for people who believe rock is "a genre that dispenses with harmony, melody and fairly good vocals".

Readers of the newspaper elected the album the second best of 1991 (second to Mais, by Marisa Monte), besides electing the group as the third best Brazilian band (behind Legião Urbana and Os Paralamas do Sucesso).

In a review of a show by the band in 1992, critic Jeferson de Souza said the album's songs worked better live than in studio.

=== Commercial reception ===
By the end of the album's tour, little over a year after its release, it had already sold 120,000 copies.

=== Band response ===
Charles Gavin confessed the group didn't know how they wanted to sound and, without a producer, it was eight musicians with different ideas and no one to mediate and provide input. Mallo admitted that the "fuck it" attitude was excessive and the album ended up being "too radical a move".

== Track listing ==
All music is composed by Titãs.

| No. | Title | Lead vocals | Length |
|---|---|---|---|
| 1. | "Clitóris" (Clitoris) | Paulo Miklos | 3:48 |
| 2. | "O Fácil é o Certo" (The Easy Thing is the Right Thing) | Sérgio Britto | 2:13 |
| 3. | "Filantrópico" (Philanthropic) | Branco Mello | 2:28 |
| 4. | "Cabeça" (Head) | Miklos | 2:06 |
| 5. | "Já" (Ever (Note: Could be translated as "now" or "already", but given the context of the lyrics, the most accurate translation to English is "ever", as in "Have you ever done this?".)) | Arnaldo Antunes | 2:13 |
| 6. | "Eu Vezes Eu" (Me Times Me) | Britto | 2:47 |
| 7. | "Isso Para Mim é Perfume" (This Is Perfume to Me) | Nando Reis | 3:18 |
| 8. | "Saia de Mim" (Get Out of Me) | Antunes | 3:10 |
| 9. | "Flat – Cemitério – Apartamento" (Flat – Cemetery – Apartment) | Mello | 1:36 |
| 10. | "Agora" (Now) | Miklos | 2:34 |
| 11. | "Não é Por Não Falar" (It's Not for Not Talking) | Britto | 2:31 |
| 12. | "Obrigado" (Thank You) | Reis | 1:06 |
| 13. | "Se Você Está Aqui" (If You Are Here) | Reis | 2:52 |
| 14. | "Eu Não Sei Fazer Música" (I Don't Know How to Make Music) | Mello | 2:50 |
| 15. | "Uma Coisa de Cada Vez" (One Thing at a Time) | Antunes | 3:16 |

== Personnel ==
- Arnaldo Antunes – lead vocals on tracks 5, 8 and 15, backing vocals, guitar
- Branco Mello – lead vocals on tracks 3, 9, and 14, backing vocals
- Nando Reis – bass, lead vocals on tracks 7, 12 and 13
- Paulo Miklos – keyboards, lead vocals on tracks 1, 4 and 10, backing vocals
- Sérgio Britto – keyboards, lead vocals on tracks 2, 6 and 11, backing vocals
- Marcelo Fromer – rhythm guitar, lead guitar
- Tony Bellotto – lead guitar, rhythm guitar
- Charles Gavin – drums and percussion
