= Õ Blésq Blom =

Studio album by Titãs
- Released: October 16, 1989
- Recorded: July 1989 – September 1989
- Genres: Alternative rock, funk rock, world music
- Length: 34:50
- Label: WEA
- Producer: Liminha

Titãs chronology
Go Back (1988)	Õ Blésq Blom (1989)	Tudo ao Mesmo Tempo Agora (1991)

Singles from Õ Blésq Blom
- 1. "Flores" Released: 1989

Õ Blésq Blom is the fifth studio album by Brazilian rock band Titãs.

== Background ==
During the previous album's (Go Back) tour, in Recife's leg, Titãs met at the Boa Viagem Beach a couple of repentismo musicians, Mauro and Quitéria (aged 68 and 57, respectively). After listening to them and appreciating their performance, they decided to record them right there, using a recorder that vocalist Paulo Miklos provided. The recorded song was used as the opening and ending tracks of the album and of its subsequent tour and was already implemented during the Go Back tour.

Mauro was a former stevedore at Recife Port and, being constantly exposed to foreigners, ended up learning several words in different languages. With the help of his wife, who started to guide him after he went blind in 1982, he would walk around the beach singing songs written in several languages at once - even though he wouldn't know the words' actual meanings - for some change, marking the tempo with an improvised caxixi made of cloth, cardboard and lead. For their participation in the album, they received the sum of NCzS 6,000 (they would normally make between NCzS 40 and NCzS 100 a day with their public presentations). Mauro had never heard his own recorded voice before.

There were plans to invite the duo to their tour, but it wasn't possible due to production limitations. At the tour's time, vocalist/saxophonist Paulo Miklos and guitarist Marcelo Fromer announced they planned to produce an album by Mauro and Quitéria via WEA.

== Recording ==
Õ Blésq Blom was recorded between July and September 1989. Its 12-song repertoire was curated from an original pool of 30 compositions.

In the first month of recordings, bassist/vocalist Nando Reis's mother died and he began the sessions still deeply affected by her death, but he later commented that the work was essential to help him process the loss.

During the album's sessions, they were visited by couple Tina Weymouth and Chris Frantz, respectively the bassist and the drummer of Talking Heads.

== Song information ==
"Miséria" was written by Arnaldo Antunes; its lyrics were longer, but Sérgio Britto and Paulo Miklos made it shorter. Caetano Veloso claimed that it made the group reach "the top of MPB". The song "Faculdade" came to Reis in a dream.

Several other songs besides the ones that actually made it to the final tracklist were prepared for the album and were left out of it. Two of them were later recovered for the Acústico MTV live album: "Nem 5 Minutos Guardados" and "A Melhor Forma". Six others (namely "Aqui É Legal", "Estrelas", "Eu Prefiro Correr", "Minha Namorada", "Porta Principal" and "Saber Sangrar") had their initial versions released later on the E-collection compilation (2001), along with other rare tracks.

== Release and promotion ==
The album was released on 16 October in a show at the São Paulo Museum of Image and Sound. As part of the album's promotional efforts, the band hired a group of graffiti artists called Tupi Não Dá (a pun on Tupinambá) to write the album's name in several strategic points of São Paulo. They also invited Caetano Veloso to write the album's press release; his son Moreno wrote a PS. The album release coincided with the release of the single "Flores".

=== Title and cover ===
The name of the album means "the first men who walked on Earth" or "the first inhabitants of Earth") in the language of Mauro and Quiteria and it comes from the lyrics for the opening track; Reis claims he was probably the one who suggested using it as the title, and he's sure he was the one who suggested adding a tilde to the "o" letter. It would originally be titled Racio Címio.

The cover art is a collage by vocalist Arnaldo Antunes, who produced five artworks and the band subsequently elected one for the final product.

== Impact and legacy ==
"With Õ Blésq Blom we really pulled the rug from under the public, who usually goes along fads." / "We could very much have seated in the comfortable throne of repetition, because there was no band like us, with the approval of the critics, the public and Caetano (laughs)".

— Branco Mello and Sérgio Britto (respectively) about Õ Blésq Blom

In two weeks, the album reached gold status, having sold 100,000 copies. According to Dicionário Cravo Albin da Música Popular Brasileira, the album sold 230,000 copies. Journalist Ricardo Alexandre spoke of 400,000 in a book released in the mid-nineties.

At Bizz magazine, José Augusto Lemos called the album "the best produced vinyl this country has ever seen". The magazine would later award it with the Bizz Award of best album both in the public and critics vote.

It was elected in 2007 by Rolling Stone Brasil as the 74th best Brazilian music album of all time. Two years prior, its cover had been elected by Bizz magazine as the 100th main rock cover of all time.

In an article published the year before in the same magazine, vocalist and keyboardist Sérgio Britto said he considered this album to be one of the best by the band, along with its predecessors Cabeça Dinossauro and Jesus não Tem Dentes no País dos Banguelas. He also said the work, "if it did not influence, at least it anticipated all that Mangue Beat wave and the mixture of MPB and nordestina music with elements of rock and electronic programming."

Then vocalist Paulo Miklos, in a 2012 interview to the same magazine, added: "In front of our stage, debuting in Recife, there were everybody which would be from the manguebeat, in the front row. [Fred] Zeroquatro [from Mundo Livre S/A] and the whole gang. This was said to me by Chico Science. As such, that moment in which we took Mauro and Quitéria at the beach and recorded that album was a laboratory moment to make that aesthetic clash which generates something, pop rock mixed with nordestina music, with a dose of violent brazilianity and stuff."

== Critical reception ==
Professional ratings
Review scores
Source	Rating
Allmusic	4.5/5 stars
Jornal do Brasil	3/3 stars

Writing for Jornal do Brasil, Aponean Rodrigues called the album "correct, good to listen to and to dance to and with moments of critical poetry". He considered Cabeça Dinossauro the "establishment of a career", Jesus não Tem Dentes no País dos Banguelas the evolution of this establishment and Õ Blésq Blom the consolidation of this evolution. He also said that "following this path, in its resplendent ascension to the Brazilian rock's Olympus to claim the crown or the curse of best Brazilian band of the genre (...) Titãs have been doing a coherent and quality job." He also praised the production, the vocals and the tracks, amidst which he found nothing below the average.

On the same newspaper, some issues later, critics Fábio Rodrigues, Tárik de Souza and Aldir Blanc also praised the album in the "O disco em questão" section.

== Track listing ==
No.	Title	Writer(s)	Lead vocals	Length
1.	"Introdução por Mauro e Quitéria" (Introduction by Mauro and Quitéria)	Mauro e Quitéria	Mauro and Quitéria	0:44
2.	"Miséria" (Poverty)	Arnaldo Antunes, Paulo Miklos, Sérgio Britto	Britto and Miklos	4:27
3.	"Racio Símio" (A word play with "Raciocínio" (reasoning) and "Símio" (simian))	Antunes, Marcelo Fromer, Nando Reis	Reis	3:19
4.	"O Camelo e o Dromedário" (The Camel and the Dromedary)	Fromer, Reis, Miklos, Tony Bellotto	Miklos	5:22
5.	"Palavras" (Words)	Fromer, Britto	Britto	2:33
6.	"Medo" (Fear)	Antunes, Fromer, Bellotto	Antunes	2:06
7.	"Natureza Morta" (Lit. "Dead Nature", though the term also refers to still life))	Antunes, Liminha, Branco Mello, Fromer, Miklos, Britto	Antunes and Mello	0:19
8.	"Flores" (Flowers)	Charles Gavin, Miklos, Britto, Bellotto	Mello	3:27
9.	"O Pulso" (The Pulse)	Antunes, Fromer, Bellotto	Antunes	2:45
10.	"32 Dentes" (32 Teeth)	Mello, Fromer, Britto	Mello	2:30
11.	"Faculdade" (Faculty/College)	Antunes, Mello, Fromer, Reis, Miklos	Reis	3:13
12.	"Deus e o Diabo" (God and the Devil)	Reis, Miklos, Britto	Britto and Miklos	3:28
13.	"Vinheta Final por Mauro e Quitéria" (Closing Fragment by Mauro and Quitéria)	Mauro e Quitéria	Mauro and Quitéria	0:35

== Personnel ==
- Tony Bellotto - Electric guitar, Acoustic guitar on track 8, 12 string acoustic guitar on track 10
- Arnaldo Antunes - lead vocals on tracks 6 and 9, co-lead vocals on track 7, backing vocals on tracks 2–4, 8 and 10–12
- Charles Gavin - drums
- Marcelo Fromer - Electric guitar, acoustic guitar on tracks 6 and 10
- Nando Reis - Bass, lead vocals on tracks 3 and 11
- Branco Mello - lead vocals on tracks 8 and 10, co-lead vocals on track 7, backing vocals on tracks 2–4, 6, 9, 11 and 12
- Paulo Miklos - lead vocals on track 4, co-lead vocals on tracks 2 and 12, Saxophone on track 8, backing vocals on tracks 3, 6 and 8–11
- Sérgio Britto - Keyboards, lead vocals on track 5, co-lead vocals on tracks 2 and 12, keyboard programming on tracks 2 and 12, additional backing vocals on tracks 6 and 8

=== Additional personnel ===
- Liminha - Electronic drums on tracks 2, 11 and 12, electric guitar on tracks 9 and 12, electronic percussion on track 4, keyboard programming on tracks 2, 9 and 12
