= Branco Mello =

Brazilian musician (born 1962)

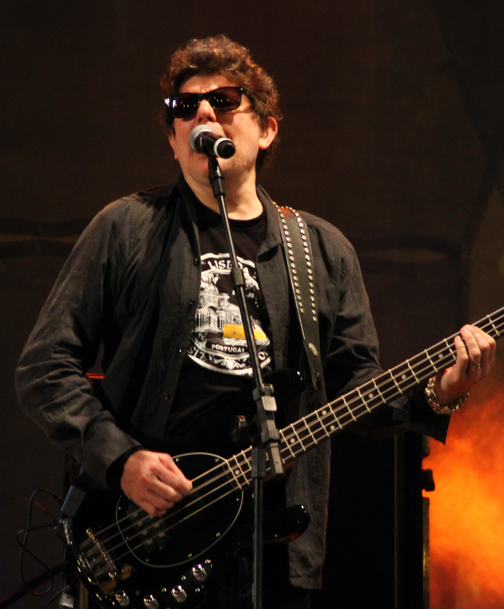
- Mello at the 2013 Virada Cultural Paulista in Barretos, São Paulo

Background information
- Born: Claudio Corrêa de Mello Júnior; March 16, 1962 (age 64)
- Genres: Rock, punk rock, post-punk, alternative rock
- Occupations: Singer, musician, songwriter, actor, producer
- Instruments: Vocals; bass guitar; guitar
- Years active: 1982–present

Branco Mello (Portuguese pronunciation: [ˈbɾɐ̃ku ˈmɛlu]; born Claudio Corrêa de Mello Júnior on March 16, 1962) is a Brazilian musician and actor, best known as the vocalist and bassist of Brazilian rock band Titãs. He has also played small but significant roles in films.

== Childhood ==
Music entered Mello's life through the cinema. Every week, his father would take him to watch musicals at Metro. The movies' soundtracks joined other influences, like Bossa Nova, or the shows promoted by his mother, Lu Brandão, a cultural producer.

In his adolescence, already nicknamed Branco ("White") by his friends, he listened to Frank Sinatra, Glenn Miller, Gilberto Gil, Caetano Veloso, Chuck Berry, just to name a few.

He decided to play the acoustic guitar. He and Marcelo Fromer, whom he met at Hugo Sacramento school, began to make the firsts partnerships. they would later briefly course linguistics at University of São Paulo, but quit it before they graduated. They even entered a music festival in Rio de Janeiro promoted by Brahma with two songs, although they were not selected. At that point they formed the Trio Mamão, with Tony Bellotto. Also at that time, they helped Serginho Groisman (which would later become the presenter of Altas Horas, a midnight program of Brazilian channel Globo) on the production of shows of famous Brazilian musicians, like Clementina de Jesus, Jorge Mautner and Luiz Melodia, three of Mello's idols.

== Career ==
In 1981, Mello and eight friends founded the band Titãs, at that time called Titãs do Iê-Iê.

In 1982, he was one of the presenters of TV Eclipse, a spectacle that parodied programs and featured almost all nine members that would later found the Titãs do Iê-Iê. At this spectacle Mello would play the role of a presenter who was a mixture of Flavio Cavalcante and Hebe Camargo.

His works for the cinema came up again in 1985, at the movie Areias Escaldantes, playing a small role of a sushi chef and a manicure.

At the first great break of the band, Mello joined Sérgio Britto, another member of the band, and the drummer Roberta Parisi and formed the band Kleiderman, where he sang and played the bass. The group presented strong lyrics and aggressive sound, and released an album called Con el Mundo a mis Pies (With the World at my Feet). In 2000, he formed the band S. Futuristmo. Although the objective of the band was only fun, they were invited to perform at Tenda Brasil do Rock 3, in January 2001.

At the end of the same year, Mello released a children project: the book/CD "Eu e Meu Guarda-Chuva" (Me and My Umbrella), which tells the story of a boy named Eugênio and his trusty umbrella. The CD comes with 10 songs made by him together with Ciro Pessoa, one of the founders of Titãs. The songs feature many famous artists, like Arnaldo Antunes, Elza Soares, Cássia Eller, Roberto Frejat, Toni Garrido and Marcelo D2. A movie with the same name was filmed based on the novel.

In May 2018, he was diagnosed with a tumor in his larynx, which forced him to step down from the band activities for three months. He was expected to be back in time to record the Doze Flores Amarelas DVD. In November 2021, the tumor returned, forcing him to spend 32 days at the hospital following another operation.

== Personal life ==
Mello lives in Rio de Janeiro with his wife, the actress and producer Ângela Figueiredo, his two sons Bento (born 1991) and Joaquim (born 1999), and his stepdaughter, Diana Bouth.

== Discography ==
=== With Kleiderman ===
- Con el mundo a mis pies

=== As producer ===
- Inocentes – Pânico em SP (1986)

=== As director and producer ===
- Titãs - A Vida Até Parece Uma Festa (2008)

=== As music director ===
- A Grande Família, O Filme (2007)

=== Guest appearances ===
Artist	Album	Song(s)	Instrument(s)
Dulce Quental	Délica (1986)	"Diferentes"	Lead vocals
Golpe de Estado	Forçando a Barra (1988)	"Onde há fumaça, há fogo"	Backing vocals
Raimundos	Raimundos (1993)	"Bê a Bá", "Bicharada" e "Carro Forte", violão de Nando Reis em "Puteiro em João Pessoa" e viola em "Selim"	Backing vocals
Various artists	O Submarino Verde Amarelo (2001)	"Get Beck"	Lead vocals
Arnaldo Antunes	Ao vivo no estúdio (2007)	"Eu não sou da sua rua"	Lead vocals
Nando Reis	Jardim-Pomar (2016)	"Azul de Presunto"	Backing vocals
