= Marcelo Fromer =

Brazilian guitarist (1961–2001)

Background information
- Born: 3 December 1961; São Paulo, Brazil
- Died: 13 June 2001 (aged 39) São Paulo, Brazil
- Genre: Rock
- Occupation: Musician
- Instrument: Guitar
- Years active: 1981–2001
- Formerly of: Trio Mamão, Titãs

Marcelo Fromer (3 December 1961 – 13 June 2001) was a Brazilian musician who was the guitarist of the rock band Titãs. One of the founding members and also the band's manager, he died in 2001 after being hit by a motorcycle while jogging.

== Early life and youth ==
Marcelo Fromer grew up in São Paulo in a house frequently visited by friends like Branco Mello, whom he met in 1974, in the Hugo Sarmento school. When he was 15 years old, he discovered The Beatles, Chico Buarque and the Tropicália, and started having guitar lessons with Luiz Tati, of the group Rumo. While studying at Equipe school, he met Tony Bellotto and formed the Trio Mamão with him and Mello. As he hated singing, he was the only one dedicated exclusively to the acoustic guitar.

Also at Equipe school, he, Mello and other classmates created the "Papagaio" magazine, featuring comics, poetry and texts about the internal decisions of the school. But he would never stop composing and playing. Soccer would also play an important role on his life. Trusty supporter of São Paulo, he managed to train for the young team of the club.

Once he finished school, he entered Linguistics at USP together with Mello, but both quit it two years later.

== Works with Titãs ==
In 1981, Titãs made their first performance (under the name Titãs do Iê-Iê) at the event "A Idade da Pedra Jovem". Fromer decided to play the electric guitar like an acoustic one, without a pick. At the end of the night, his fingers were seriously injured and there was blood all over his white Giannini.

In the early 1980s, he would gather new names of the São Paulo scene in his house to discuss their situation, including a minimum value for their fees and the conditions of the venues they would play in.

In 1984, with the releasing of Titãs first album, Fromer showed that he could work as a businessman, and he was chosen to be the manager the band. Another passion of Fromer, which appeared mostly during the first tours of the band, was the gastronomy. He would always choose the restaurants were the group should eat throughout the country. This passion would be the subject of the song "As Aventuras do Guitarrista Gourmet Atrás da Refeição Ideal", featured at Como Estão Vocês?.

His "business-gourmet" lives would join each other at Rock Dog (word play with Hot Dog), a snack bar specialized in hot dogs that he opened in 1989, in São Paulo, in a partnership of his brothers Thiago and Cuca, and the band members Mello and Bellotto. In 2000, he became a partner of the Campana, a Pizza shop also located in São Paulo. A year before, he released the book Você Tem Fome de Quê?, in which he listed cookery recipes from many restaurants of Brazil, along with tablatures and curiosities of Titãs main hits.

== Other works ==
Fromer left unfinished a biography of former football player and TV commentator Walter Casagrande, his personal friend. The project was resumed in 2008 by Gilvan Ribeiro and released in 2013.

== Death ==
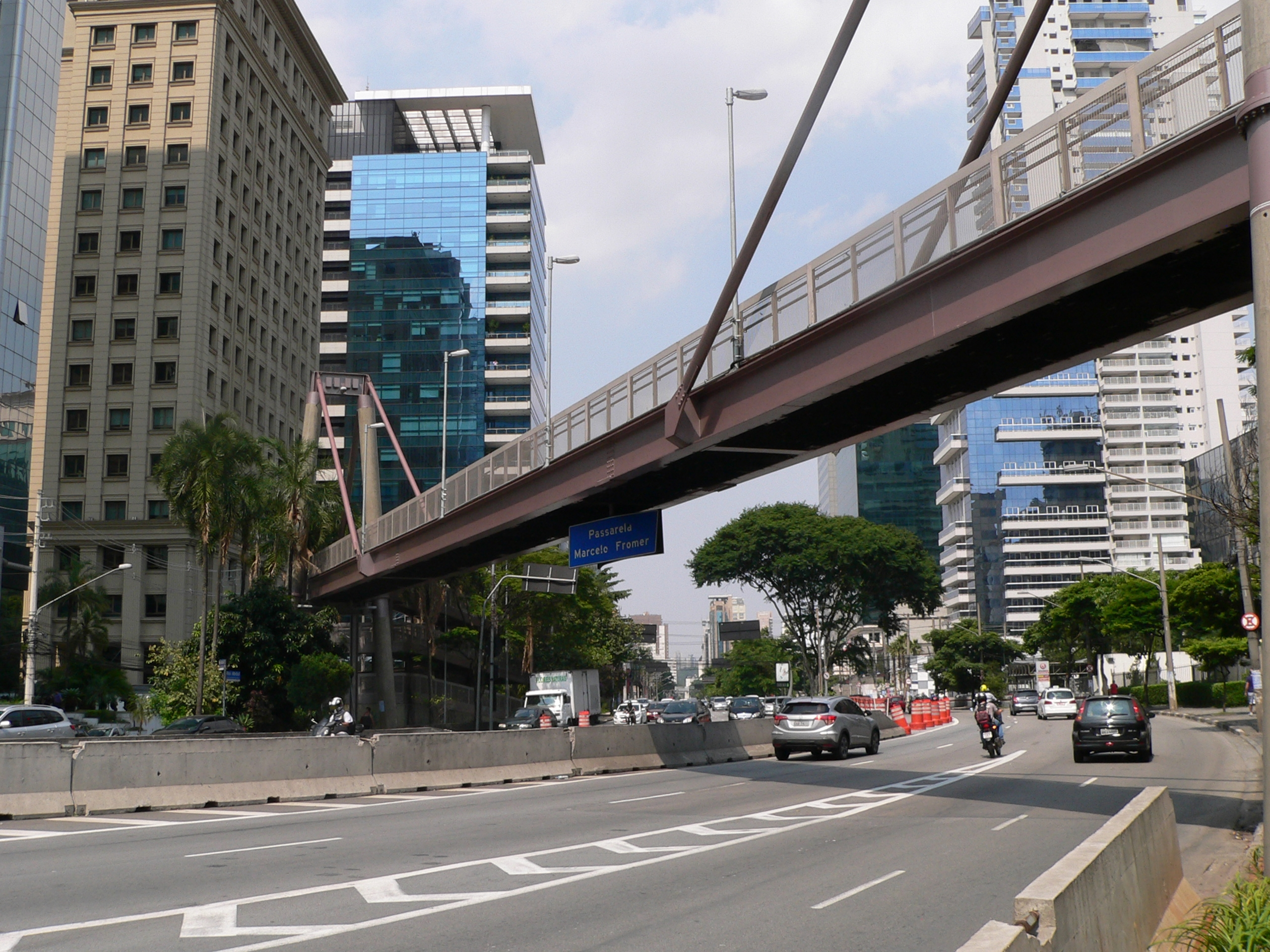
The skyway named after Fromer over Juscelino Kubitschek Avenue in São Paulo

Our Brother Marcelo has died. We lived with him every day for more than twenty years. Marcelo was always a source of good cheer for us. (Translation note: words used could also be read as "donor of happiness," a reference to the donation of his organs.) It is impossible to express in words the importance that he had, not only musically, but in the lives of each of us. Just as his organs will live on in the bodies of other people, his art will continue in the music and spirit of Titãs.

— Part of the official statement released by the band on the day of Marcelo's death, also signed by ex-Titan Arnaldo Antunes.

On 11 June 2001, a day before the start of the recording of the band's 13th album, A Melhor Banda de Todos os Tempos da Última Semana, Fromer was crossing Europa Avenue in southern São Paulo when a red Honda CG125 motorcycle, driven by Erasmo Castro da Costa Jr., struck him. Erasmo called an ambulance, but fled the scene when the police arrived, as his driving license was no longer valid. Two days later, Fromer died in hospital. Presumably, his head struck Erasmo's helmet.

In July 2002, Erasmo was found by the police. He stated he did not know the man he struck was Fromer until his death. He also alleged that Fromer was to blame for the accident, as there was a crosswalk 15 meters away; Fromer decided to cross the avenue between the cars, making it impossible for Erasmo to see Fromer.

Fromer's family authorized the donation of his organs. His heart, liver, pancreas, kidneys, and his corneas were all donated.

On 7 September 2001, a skyway named after him was inaugurated over Avenida Juscelino Kubitschek, in São Paulo.

== Personal life ==
Fromer lived in São Paulo. By the end of the 1980s, he was in a relationship with actress Betty Gofman. His first marriage with Martha Locatelli Fromer brought along his first child, Susy. His second marriage to Ana Cristina Martinelli, also known as "Tina", resulted in the birth of children Alice and Max. He was a São Paulo FC fan.
