= Titãs discography =

- Studio albums: 16
- Live albums: 6
- Compilation albums: 3
- Singles: 39
- Videography: 7

The following is the discography of Brazilian rock band Titãs.

== Studio albums ==
Year	Album	Certifications (Brazil) (sales thresholds)
1984	Titãs	
1985	Televisão	
1986	Cabeça Dinossauro	Platinum
1987	Jesus não Tem Dentes no País dos Banguelas	2× Platinum
1989	Õ Blésq Blom	Gold
1991	Tudo ao Mesmo Tempo Agora	Gold
1993	Titanomaquia	
1995	Domingo	Gold
1998	Volume Dois	2× Gold, 4× Platinum
1999	As Dez Mais	2× Platinum
2001	A Melhor Banda de Todos os Tempos da Última Semana	Gold
2003	Como Estão Vocês?	
2009	Sacos Plásticos	
2014	Nheengatu	
2018	Doze Flores Amarelas	
2021	Titãs Trio Acústico	

== Live albums ==
Year	Album	Certifications (Brazil) (sales thresholds)
1988	Go Back	Gold, Platinum
1997	Acústico MTV	2× Gold, 6× Platinum, 2× Diamond
2005	MTV ao Vivo: Titãs	
2012	Cabeça Dinossauro ao Vivo 2012	
2015	Nheengatu ao Vivo	
2018	Doze Flores Amarelas ao Vivo	

== Compilations ==
Year	Album	Certifications (Brazil) (sales thresholds)
1994	Titãs - 84 94 Um	Gold
1994	Titãs - 84 94 Dois	Gold
2000	E-collection	

== Singles ==
Year	Single	Album
1984	"Sonífera Ilha" b/w "Toda Cor"	Titãs
1984	"Go Back"	Titãs
1984	"Babi Índio"	Titãs
1985	"Insensível"	Televisão
1985	"Televisão"	Televisão
1986	"Massacre"	Televisão
1986	"Aa Uu"	Cabeça Dinossauro
1986	"O Que"	Cabeça Dinossauro
1986	"Polícia"	Cabeça Dinossauro
1987	"Homem Primata"	Cabeça Dinossauro
1987	"Família"	Cabeça Dinossauro
1987	"Bichos Escrotos"	Cabeça Dinossauro
1987	"Lugar Nenhum"	Jesus não Tem Dentes no País dos Banguelas
1987	"Comida"	Jesus não Tem Dentes no País dos Banguelas
1988	"Desordem"	Jesus não Tem Dentes no País dos Banguelas
1988	"Diversão"	Jesus não Tem Dentes no País dos Banguelas
1988	"Go Back (live)"	Go Back
1988	"Marvin (Patches) (live)"	Go Back
1989	"Não Vou Me Adaptar (live)"	Go Back
1989	"Pipi Popô" / "A Marcha do Demo" (as Vestidos de Espaço)	
1989	"Flores"	Õ Blésq Blom
1989	"Miséria"	Õ Blésq Blom
1989	"Medo"	Õ Blésq Blom
1990	"Deus e o Diabo"	Õ Blésq Blom
1990	"O Pulso"	Õ Blésq Blom
1995	"Domingo"	Domingo
1998	"É Preciso Saber Viver"	Volume Dois
1999	"Pelados em Santos"	As Dez Mais
2000	"Aluga-se"	As Dez Mais
2001	"A Melhor Banda de Todos os Tempos da Última Semana"	A Melhor Banda de Todos os Tempos da Última Semana
2002	"Epitáfio"	A Melhor Banda de Todos os Tempos da Última Semana
2002	"O Mundo é Bão, Sebastião!"	A Melhor Banda de Todos os Tempos da Última Semana
2004	"Enquanto Houver Sol"	Como Estão Vocês?
2004	"Provas de Amor"	Como Estão Vocês?
2005	"Vossa Excelência"	MTV ao Vivo: Titãs
2006	"O Inferno São Os Outros"	MTV ao Vivo: Titãs
2009	"Antes de Você"	Sacos Plásticos
2009	"Porque Eu Sei que É Amor"	Sacos Plásticos
2014	"Fardado"	Nheengatu

== Videography ==
=== Video albums ===
Year	Album
1997	Acústico MTV
1998	Volume Dois ao Vivo
2002	Luau MTV: Titãs
2005	MTV ao Vivo: Titãs
2012	Cabeça Dinossauro ao Vivo 2012
2015	Nheengatu ao Vivo
2018	Doze Flores Amarelas ao Vivo

=== Promotional videos ===
- "Toda cor"
- "Babi índio"
- "Insensível"
- "Aa uu"
- "Cabeça dinossauro"
- "O que"
- "Homem primata"
- "Lugar nenhum"
- "Comida"
- "Desordem"
- "Todo mundo quer amor"
- "Nome aos bois"
- "Go back (remix)"
- "Marvin (live)"
- "Não vou me adaptar (live)"
- "Massacre (live)"
- "Flores" (1990 MTV Video Music Awards Brasil winner)
- "Miséria"
- "Medo"
- "Deus e o Diabo" (recorded in New York City)
- "O pulso"
- "Saia de Mim"
- "Não é por não falar"
- "Clitóris"
- "Será que é disso o que eu necessito?"
- "Nem sempre se pode ser Deus"
- "Taxidermia"
- "Eu não aguento"
- "Eu não vou dizer nada"
- "Pra dizer adeus (unplugged)" [extracted from DVD Acústico MTV]
- "Os cegos do castelo (unplugged)"
- "Nem cinco minutos guardados (unplugged)"
- "É preciso saber viver"
- "Pelados em Santos"
- "Aluga-se"
- "A melhor banda de todos os tempos da última semana"
- "Isso"
- "Epitáfio" (2002 Video Music Brasil winner)
- "Eu não sou um bom lugar"
- "Enquanto houver sol"
- "Provas de amor"
- "Vou duvidar"
- "Antes de você"
- "Porque eu sei que é amor"
- "Amor por dinheiro"
- "Quanto tempo"
- "Fardado"
- "República dos Bananas"
- "Cadáver Sobre Cadáver (ao vivo)"

=== Other video releases ===
- Tudo ao Mesmo Tempo Agora (1991, features a "making of" the album)

== Cover songs ==
=== Covers by Titãs ===
Song	Original version by	Album	Notes
"Marvin (Patches)"	Ron Dunbar	Titãs	Portuguese language version of "Patches"
Querem meu Sangue	Jimmy Cliff	Titãs	Portuguese-language version of "The Harder They Come"
"Balada Para John E Yoko"	The Beatles	Titãs	Portuguese-language version of "Ballad of John and Yoko"
"Eu Não Aguento"	Banda Tiroteio	Domingo, Volume Dois	Domingo version featured Sérgio Boneka as a guest musician
"É Preciso Saber Viver"	Roberto Carlos and Erasmo Carlos	Volume Dois	
"O Portão"	Roberto Carlos and Erasmo Carlos	MTV ao Vivo: Titãs	
"Que País É Este?"	Legião Urbana	Renato Russo - Uma Celebração	Has been performed live several times
"Fábrica 2"	Renato Russo	Renato Russo - Uma Celebração	
"Canalha"	Walter Franco	Nheengatu	

This list does not include the songs from As Dez Mais.

=== Titãs covers by other musicians ===
- "Comida"
  - Marisa Monte, on her 1989 debut album Marisa Monte
  - Ney Matogrosso, on his 1989 live album Ney Matogrosso ao vivo
  - Exaltasamba, on their 2005 album Esquema Novo
- "Miséria" was sampled by Adriana Calcanhotto on her 1992 album Senhas, in the song "Milagres" ("Miracles").
- "Go Back"
  - Só Pra Contrariar on their 1993 debut album Só Pra Contrariar
  - Os Paralamas do Sucesso on their 1994 album Severino
  - Patrícia Marx on her 1997 album Charme do Mundo
  - LS Jack on their 1999 debut album LS Jack
- "Querem Meu Sangue" by Cidade Negra on their 1994 album Sobre Todas as Forças
- "Estrelas" by Adriana Calcanhotto on her 1994 album A Fábrica do Poema
- "Eu Prefiro Correr" by Patrícia Marx on her 1994 album Ficar Com Você
- "O Caroço da Cabeça" by Os Paralamas do Sucesso on their 1996 album Nove Luas
- "Diversão" by Nocaute
- "Estado Violência by Biquini Cavadão on their 2001 album 80
- "Dona Nenê"
  - Rodolfo Abrantes (ex-Raimundos) in 2001
  - Ciro Pessoa on his 2003 solo album No Meio da Chuva Eu Grito Help
- "Amanhã Não Se Sabe" by LS Jack, on their 2003 album Tudo Outra Vez
- "Disneylândia" by Jorge Drexler on his 2006 album 12 Segundos de Oscuridad
- "Agora" by Maria Bethânia on her 2006 album Mar de Sophia
- "Os Cegos do Castelo" by Margareth Menezes on her 2008 album Naturalmente

"Sonífera Ilha", "Polícia", "Marvin", "Família", "Aa Uu" and "Epitáfio" have also been covered. See their articles for more information.

== Guest appearances ==
- Song "Tempo" (Time, composed by Paulo Miklos and Arnaldo Antunes) on Sandra de Sá's 1985 album Sandra de Sá
- Song "Papai me empresta o carro" (Daddy, Lend Me The Car) on Rita Lee's 1998 live album Acústico MTV: Rita Lee
- Song "Cara Feia" (Ugly Face) on Gabriel o Pensador's 2002 live album MTV ao Vivo: Gabriel, o Pensador

For information on the band members' guest appearances, see their individual articles.

== Featured songs ==
- "Aa Uu" - Hiper Tensão (Rede Globo, 1986)
- "Família" - Corpo Santo (Rede Manchete, 1987)
- "Nem sempre se pode ser Deus" - Confissões de Adolescentes (TV Cultura, 1994)
- "Eu não vou dizer nada (além do que estou dizendo)" - Perdidos de Amor (TV Bandeirantes, 1996)
- "É Preciso Saber Viver" - Pecado Capital (Rede Globo, 1998)
- "Epitáfio" - Desejos de Mulher (Rede Globo, 2002)
- "Isso" - O Beijo do Vampiro (Rede Globo, 2002)
- "Enquanto Houver Sol" - Celebridade (Rede Globo, 2003)
- "Provas de Amor" - Como uma Onda (Rede Globo, 2004)
- "Sonífera Ilha" - Três Irmãs (Rede Globo, 2008)
- "Polícia" - Força-Tarefa (Rede Globo, 2009)
- "Antes de Você" - Caras & Bocas (Rede Globo, 2009)
- "Pelo Avesso" - Cama de Gato (Rede Globo, 2009)
- "Porque Eu Sei que É Amor" - Cama de Gato (Rede Globo, 2009)
- "Go Back (2010 Version)" - Ti Ti Ti (Rede Globo, 2010)

== Bibliography ==
- (Portuguese) Hérica Marmo and Luiz André Alzer: A vida até parece uma festa - Toda a história dos Titãs (Life Even Looks Like a Party - All the History of Titãs). Editora Record, December 2002.
- (Portuguese) Felipe Mendes Trotta: Titânicos caminhos (Titanic ways). Editora Gryphus, 1995.
- (Portuguese) Ricardo Alexandre: Titãs - do underground ao acústico (Titãs - from the Underground to the Acoustic). Editora ACME, 1997.
