= Go Back (album) =

1988 live album by Titãs

Live album by Titãs
- Released: 1988
- Recorded: 8 July 1988
- Genre: Rock
- Length: 50:41
- Label: WEA
- Producer: Liminha

Titãs chronology
Jesus não Tem Dentes no País dos Banguelas (1987)	Go Back (1988)	Õ Blésq Blom (1989)

Singles from Go Back
- 1. "Go Back" Released: 1988; 2. "Marvin" Released: 1988

Go Back is the first live album by Brazilian rock band Titãs. It was recorded on 8 July 1988 at the Montreux Jazz Festival in Switzerland and released on 14 October of the same year.

The album was seen by the band as the end of a cycle. It generated two singles: "Go Back" and "Marvin".

== The show in Montreux ==
Before Titãs, other Brazilian artists had already recorded performances at the festival, such as Pepeu Gomes, Os Paralamas do Sucesso, Elba Ramalho and A Cor do Som.

The band's show was their first on foreign soil. The rehearsals were carried out at a studio in London, where guitarist Tony Bellotto met Jimmy Page and asked him to autograph his Gibson Les Paul with a screwdriver so the letters would never wear off.

The preparation for the concert was marked by difficulties; members claimed they received no help from their label nor from the festival's production team for things like carrying their equipment, moving across Europe, renting studios and rehearse (the roadies still hadn't arrived from Brazil). They soundchecked late and only had 15 minutes to do it. Liminha, hired by the band as a third guitarist, had a problem in his amplifier and wasn't audible for most of the show; he later re-recorded his parts in studio for the album. Drummer Charles Gavin had to play a borrowed set. According to then bassist and vocalist Nando Reis, the album features some additional overdubbing. The final result disappointed them to the point that they gave up putting the album out after listening to the tape, but they changed their minds after watching footage of the show at festival director Claude Nobs's house.

About the audience, the band stated they were received with a certain strangeness, but the public (estimated at 2,000 people) grew in quantity and enthusiasm as the concert progressed.

The band's trip to Switzerland generated expectation for a supposed attempt to project the band internationally; members dismissed this idea claiming that in order to try a career abroad, they would have to make long-term planning.

The setlist involved tracks then lesser known from their first two albums, such as "Marvin" (Titãs) and "Pavimentação" (Televisão), and more famous songs from their two subsequent albums, such as "Polícia" (Cabeça Dinossauro) and "Diversão" (Jesus não Tem Dentes no País dos Banguelas). Journalist Ricardo Alexandre analyzed that now these tracks were part of the setlist "within a logical evolutionary process, and no longer as victims of a sharp rupture made by the 'punk' album Cabeça Dinossauro".

== Album production ==
From the 15 tracks played in the show, 13 were selected, since the album would not accommodate them all.

Go Back was mixed at Swanyard studios in London, with the members present and also at the Recording Plant in Los Angeles and at the Nas Nuvens in Rio de Janeiro. Mixing was finished on 12 July 1988. The recording was done digitally in 24 channels.

Following the mixing, they went to Lisbon for a local tour, supporting Xutos & Pontapés.

== Release and impact ==
In order to promote the album to the press, a special book with pictures and interviews done by then president of WEA, André Midani, was prepared. The cover and back cover of the album feature pictures of the eight members as children. On the front cover, starting on the top left and going clockwise, Reis, keyboardist and vocalist Sérgio Britto, then vocalist and saxophonist Paulo Miklos and Bellotto can be seen. On the back cover, following the same directions, guitarist Marcelo Fromer, vocalists Branco Mello and Arnaldo Antunes and drummer Charles Gavin can be seen. The booklet has then recent pictures of the members touring around Europe.

Despite the album having come out after the promulgation of the current Constitution of Brazil, which abolished censorship, copies were still pressed with a sticker warning against radio airplay of "Bichos Escrotos".

Between October and November 1988, they did a promotional tour and planned to go to Los Angeles to record their then next album. According to the Dicionário Cravo Albin da Música Popular Brasileira, the album has sold 320,000 copies; journalist Ricardo Alexandre speaks of 350,000.

== Critical reception ==
Professional ratings
Review scores
Source	Rating
Allmusic	2.5/5 stars
Jornal do Brasil	3/3 stars

Writing on allmusic, Eduardo Rivadavia called their performance "triumphant" but said the album, although sampling "the band's many talents" was "still something of a grab bag that is bound to omit certain personal favorites for every fan".

Arthur Dapieve, from Jornal do Brasil, congratulated the "courage" of the band to face an unknown audience and the new arrangements. He concluded his review by saying, in allusion to the lyrics of "Não Vou Me Adaptar", that "Titãs have always spoken what no one's said; they have always listened to what no one's heard; and will never adapt — to the mediocrity of the cowards".

== Track listing ==
Go Back tracklisting
No.	Title	Writer(s)	Lead vocals	Length
1.	"Jesus Não Tem Dentes no País dos Banguelas"	Marcelo Fromer, Nando Reis	Reis	2:32
2.	"Nome aos Bois"	Arnaldo Antunes, Fromer, Reis, Tony Bellotto	Nando	1:47
3.	"Bichos Escrotos"	Antunes, Reis, Sérgio Britto	Paulo Miklos	3:18
4.	"Pavimentação"	Antunes, Paulo Miklos	Paulo	3:33
5.	"Diversão"	Reis, Britto	Miklos	5:03
6.	"Marvin"	R. Dunbar, G. N. Johnson / version by Reis and Britto	Nando	4:21
7.	"AA UU"	Fromer, Britto	Britto	2:36
8.	"Go Back"	Britto, Torquato Neto	Sérgio	3:40
9.	"Polícia"	Bellotto	Britto	2:17
10.	"Cabeça Dinossauro"	Antunes, Mello, Miklos	Mello	2:25
11.	"Massacre"	Fromer, Britto	Mello	1:58
12.	"Não Vou Me Adaptar"	Antunes	Antunes	3:20
13.	"Lugar Nenhum"	Antunes, Charles Gavin, Fromer, Britto, Bellotto	Antunes	4:14

CD version bonus tracks
No.	Title	Writer(s)	Lead vocals	Length
14.	"Marvin (Patches) (remix)"	R. Dunbar, G. N. Johnson / version by Reis e Britto	Reis	4:14
15.	"Go Back (remix)"	Britto, Netto	Britto	5:23

== Personnel ==
Titãs

- Arnaldo Antunes – vocals
- Branco Mello – vocals
- Nando Reis – vocals, bass
- Sérgio Britto – vocals, keyboards
- Paulo Miklos – vocals, saxophone
- Tony Bellotto – lead guitar
- Marcelo Fromer – rhythm guitar
- Charles Gavin – drums, percussion

Session member

- Liminha – third guitar
