= Nheengatu ao Vivo =

Live album by Titãs
- Released: 28 August 2015
- Genre: Punk rock, rock
- Length: 69:05
- Label: Som Livre

Titãs chronology
Nheengatu (2014)	Nheengatu ao Vivo (2015)	Doze Flores Amarelas (2018)

Nheengatu ao Vivo is the seventh live album by Brazilian rock band Titãs, released in August 2015. It was released as CD, DVD and digital download. It was recorded during the band's Nheengatu Tour, promoting the album released in 2014. It includes live renditions of songs from previous albums, as well. In June 2016, Nheengatu ao Vivo won the Brazilian Music Awards, in the "Best Pop/Rock/Reggae/Hip-hop/Funk Group" category. It is the band's last release with vocalist, guitarist and founding member Paulo Miklos, who announced his departure in July 2016.

== Tracks ==
No.	Title	Writer(s)	Length
1.	"Fardado" (Uniformed)	Sérgio Britto/Paulo Miklos	3:19
2.	"Pedofilia" (Pedophilia)	Britto/Miklos/Tony Bellotto	2:01
3.	"Cadáver Sobre Cadáver" (Corpse on top of Corpse)	Miklos/Arnaldo Antunes	2:52
4.	"Chegada ao Brasil" (Arrival in Brazil)	Branco Mello/Emerson Villani/Aderbal Freire	2:27
5.	"Massacre"	Marcelo Fromer/Britto	2:07
6.	"Jesus não Tem Dentes no País dos Banguelas" (Jesus Doesn't Have Teeth in the Land of the Teethless)	Fromer/Nando Reis	2:07
7.	"Lugar Nenhum" (Nowhere)	Antunes/Charles Gavin/Fromer/Britto/Bellotto	3:23
8.	"Baião de Dois" (Lit. "Baião of Two", a Northeastern Brazil typical dish)	Miklos	2:36
9.	"Pela Paz" (For Peace)	Mello/Reis/Britto/Gavin/Miklos	3:31
10.	"Quem São os Animais?" (Who Are the Animals)	Britto	2:30
11.	"República dos Bananas" (A word play on "República das Bananas" (Banana republic) and the fact that "banana" in Portuguese means both the fruit or a fool, a loser.)	Mello/Angeli/Hugo Possolo/Villani	2:14
12.	"Nem Sempre Se Pode Ser Deus" (It's Not Always Possible to Be God)	Titãs	2:14
13.	"Diversão" (Fun)	Reis/Britto	4:32
14.	"Mensageiro da Desgraça" (Messenger of Disgrace)	Miklos/Bellotto/Britto	3:26
15.	"Fala, Renata" (Speak, Renata)	Bellotto/Miklos/Britto	3:30
16.	"Desordem" (Disorder)	Gavin/Fromer/Britto	4:41
17.	"Vossa Excelência" (Thy Excellency)	Gavin/Miklos/Bellotto	3:12
18.	"Televisão" (Television)	Antunes/Fromer/Bellotto	3:10
19.	"Sonífera Ilha" (Sleepy Island)	Mello/Carlos Barmack/Ciro Pessoa/Fromer/Bellotto	3:04
20.	"Polícia" (Police)	Bellotto	2:01
21.	"AA UU"	Fromer/Britto	2:51
22.	"Flores" (Flowers)	Gavin/Miklos/Britto/Bellotto	3:34
23.	"Bichos Escrotos" (Freaky Critters)	Antunes/Britto/Reis	3:43
Total length:			69:05

== Line up ==
Titãs

- Paulo Miklos – vocals and rhythm guitar
- Branco Mello – vocals and bass
- Sérgio Britto – vocals, keyboards and bass
- Tony Bellotto – lead guitar

Touring member

- Mario Fabre – drums
