= MTV ao Vivo (Titãs album) =

Live album by Titãs
- Released: September 2005
- Recorded: August 12 and August 13, 2005, at the São José da Ponta Grossa fortress, in Florianópolis, Santa Catarina.
- Genre: Alternative rock, punk rock
- Length: 56:23
- Label: Sony BMG
- Producer: Jack Endino

Titãs chronology
Como Estão Vocês? (2003)	MTV ao Vivo (2005)	Sacos Plásticos (2009)

Singles from MTV ao Vivo
- 1. "Vossa Excelência" Released: 2005; 2. "O Inferno São os Outros"" Released: 2006; 3. "Anjo Exterminador" Released: 2006

MTV ao Vivo is the third live album by Brazilian rock band Titãs. It was recorded during a show at Fortaleza de São José da Ponta Grossa, in Florianópolis, Santa Catarina on 12 and 13 August from that year and released as CD and DVD. The album was edited and mixed Jack Endino (who also produced it, marking the last time he produced an album for the band) at Mega studios in Rio de Janeiro from August to September 2005 and mastered at Classic Master studios, in São Paulo, in September of the same year.

The album features three new songs: "O Inferno São os Outros", ""Anjo Exterminador" and "Vossa Excelência", besides a cover of "O Portão", originally by Roberto Carlos (CD-exclusive).

== Track listing ==
No.	Title	Music	Lead vocals	Length
1.	"A Melhor Banda de Todos os Tempos da Última Semana" (Last Week's Best Band Ever)	Sérgio Britto/Mello	Branco Mello	3:17
2.	"AA UU"	Britto/Marcelo Fromer	Sérgio Britto	2:30
3.	"Vossa Excelência" (Thy Excellency)	Gavin, Miklos and Tony Bellotto	Paulo Miklos	3:09
4.	"Aluga-se" (For Rent)	Raul Seixas and Cláudio Roberto	Britto and Miklos	3:08
5.	"Lugar Nenhum" (Nowhere)	Bellotto, Gavin, Fromer, Britto and Arnaldo Antunes	Mello	3:36
6.	"Enquanto Houver Sol" (As Long as There's Sun)	Sérgio Britto	Britto	2:49
7.	"Provas de Amor" (Proofs of Love)	Miklos	Miklos	3:10
8.	"Mentiras" (Lies)	Britto, Fromer and Bellotto	Britto	2:08
9.	"Anjo Exterminador" (Exterminator Angel)	Britto	Britto	3:14
10.	"Vamos ao Trabalho" (Let's Go to Work)	Miklos	Miklos	1:45
11.	"Cabeça Dinossauro" (Dinosaur Head)	Paulo Miklos, Branco Mello and Arnaldo Antunes	Mello	1:43
12.	"Não Vou Lutar" (I'm Not Gonna Fight)	Miklos and Britto	Miklos	3:07
13.	"Bichos Escrotos" (Freaky Worms)	Britto, Nando Reis and Antunes	Miklos	3:16
14.	"Eu Não sei Fazer Música" (I Don't Know How to Make Music)	Titãs	Mello	1:50
15.	"O Inferno São os Outros" (Hell Is Other People)	Mello, Gavin and Bellotto	Mello	2:49
16.	"Polícia" (Police)	Bellotto	Miklos	1:48
17.	"O Portão" (The Gate)	Roberto Carlos Eduardo Araújo and Erasmo Carlos	Mello	3:17
18.	"Epitáfio" (Epitaph)	Britto	Britto	2:51
19.	"Flores" (Flowers)	Bellotto, Miklos, Gavin and Britto	Mello	3:22
20.	"Diversão" (Fun)	Britto and Reis	Miklos	3:34

== Singles ==
=== "O Inferno São os Outros" ===
"O Inferno São os Outros"

Single by Titãs

from the album MTV Ao Vivo
- Released: 2006
- Genre: Rock
- Label: BMG
- Producer(s): Liminha

Titãs singles chronology
"Vossa Excelência" (2005)	"O Inferno São os Outros" (2006)	"Antes de Você" (2009)

"O Inferno São os Outros" was released as the twentieth single by Titãs in 2006. The title of the song translates as "Hell is other people", a quotation from No Exit by Jean-Paul Sartre.

==== Track listing ====
No.	Title	Music	Length
1.	""O Inferno São os Outros"" (Hell Is Other People)	Mello, Gavin and Bellotto	2:49

== Personnel ==
Adapted from the album booklet:

=== Titãs ===
- Paulo Miklos - lead vocals on tracks 3, 7, 10, 12, 13 and 20; co-lead vocals on 4; backing vocals on tracks 1, 2, 5, 6, 8, 9, 11, 15–19; guitar on tracks 3, 10–14, 16, 18 and 19; harmonica on tracks 1 and 4
- Branco Mello - lead vocals on tracks 1, 5, 11, 14, 15, 17 and 19; backing vocals on tracks 2–4, 6–10, 13, 16 and 20; bass on tracks 10–14, 16 and 18
- Sérgio Britto - lead vocals on tracks 2, 6, 8, 9, 16 and 18; co-lead vocals on 4; backing vocals on tracks 1, 3, 5, 7, 10–15, 17, 19 and 20; keyboard on tracks 6, 7, 11-13 and 17–20
- Tony Bellotto - guitar on all tracks; solos on tracks 2, 13, 20
- Charles Gavin - drums on all tracks

=== Session musicians ===
- Emerson Villani: backing vocals on track 1; guitar on tracks 1–9, 15, 17, 19 and 20; solo on track 5
- Lee Marcucci - bass on tracks 1–9, 15, 17, 19 and 20

=== Technical personnel ===
- Jack Endino - production, recording engineering, edition and mixing
- Paulo Peres, Alexandre Tubita and Lincoln Mendes - auxiliary recording technicians
- Fernando Fortes and Cláudio Fujimori - recording assistants
- Marco Hoffer - studio assistant and Pro Tools editing
- Guthemberg Pereira, Tude and Arthur - editing and mixing assistants
- Carlos Freitas - mastering
- Nelson Damascena - executive production
- Bruno Batista - art directing
- Paula Melo - project coordination
- Deyse Simões - manager
- Toni Vanzolini, Gualter Pupo and Christiano Calvet - cover and graphical project
- Marcelo Rossi - cover and booklet photographs
- Daniela Conolly - art supervising
- Sandro Mesquita - graphical coordination

==== Pre-production ====
Carried out at Nimbus Studios, in São Paulo, from June to August 2005; and on Jam House Studios, in Rio de Janeiro, in July and August 2005

- Canrobert Marques - monitor technician
- Sergio Trentini and Vicente Cernauskas - roadies
- San Issobe, ângelo Cazarin, Julio Cazarin and Felipe Barros - recording technicians at Nimbus Studios
- Xuxa, Rodrigo Issobe, Rui Goreba and Lirinha - assistants at Nimbus Studios
- Augusto César - assistant at Jam House Studios

==== Show productions ====
- Frederico Fonseca and Lica Paludo - show production
- Liliam Teixeira, Renatos Santos and Francisco Oliveira - production assistants
- Toni Vanzolini e Gualter Pupo - scenography
- Denis Netto - scenography assistant
- Celso Luiz dos Santos - scenotechnician
- Marcos Olívio - lighting
- Spock - lighting assistant
- Claudia Kopke - costume designer
- Anísio Lima - power amp technician
- Canrobert Marques - monitor technician
- Sombra Jones, Sergio Trentini and Vicente Cernauskas - roadies
- Lauro Silva - security guard
- Wagner Credendio and Juarez Modesto - drivers
- Golden Air Aerotaxi - helicopter rent
