= Cabeça Dinossauro ao Vivo 2012 =

Live album by Titãs
- Released: December 14, 2012
- Recorded: Circo Voador, Rio de Janeiro, in June 2012
- Genre: Punk rock, Rock
- Length: 45:23
- Label: Diversão e Arte; Universal Music (distribution)

Titãs chronology
Sacos Plásticos (2009)	Cabeça Dinossauro ao Vivo 2012 (2012)	Nheengatu (2014)

Cabeça Dinossauro ao Vivo 2012 is the sixth live album released by Brazilian rock band Titãs. It consists on a live reproduction of their third album, 1986's Cabeça Dinossauro. It was performed live and respecting the original tracks order. It was their first release with session drummer Mario Fabre, who replaced long-standing member Charles Gavin in 2010.

The album was released on CD, DVD and Blu-ray formats, and fans could acquire signed copies at a sign session promoted by the band at Livraria Cultura, in São Paulo. The DVD images are all in black & white, with some of the footage taken among the crowd, and with little technical apparel. The DVD and CD together sold 25,000 copies, as of March 2013. In 2013, with this album, Titãs was nominated for the Brazilian Music Awards, in the category Best Pop/Rock/Reggae/Hip hop/Funk Group.

The band started to perform the album live after an invitation from cultural center Sesc Belemzinho, in São Paulo, for them to take part in the Projeto Álbum (Project Album), which aims to revisit albums considered to be anthological. They initially had no intention of revisiting the album - something they considered to be "a gringo fashion" - but since the seven shows they did sold out real quick, they saw a potential in recording it. Also, the band says it helped them revisiting their own DNA, which would later influence their then-forthcoming studio album Nheengatu.

== Reception ==
Thales de Menezes, from Folha de S.Paulo, rated the album as "great" and considered Cabeça Dinossauro's tour as the best part of the band's 30-year celebration.

== Track listing ==
No.	Title	Lyrics	Lead vocals	Length
1.	"Cabeça Dinossauro" (Dinosaur Head)	Arnaldo Antunes, Branco Mello, Paulo Miklos	Branco Mello	2:19
2.	"AA UU"	Marcelo Fromer, Sérgio Britto	Sérgio Britto	3:01
3.	"Igreja" (Church)	Nando Reis	Branco Mello	2:47
4.	"Polícia" (Police)	Tony Bellotto	Sergio Britto	2:07
5.	"Estado Violência" (Violence State)	Charles Gavin	Paulo Miklos	3:07
6.	"A Face do Destruidor" (The Face of the Destroyer)	Arnaldo Antunes, Paulo Miklos	Paulo Miklos	0:38
7.	"Porrada" (Punch)	Arnaldo Antunes, Sérgio Britto	Sérgio Britto	2:49
8.	"Tô Cansado" (I'm Tired)	Branco Mello, Arnaldo Antunes	Branco Mello	2:16
9.	"Bichos Escrotos" (Freaky Critters)	Nando Reis, Arnaldo Antunes, Sérgio Britto	Paulo Miklos	3:14
10.	"Família" (Family)	Tony Bellotto, Arnaldo Antunes	Sérgio Britto	3:32
11.	"Homem Primata" (Primate Man)	Marcelo Fromer, Ciro Pessoa, Nando Reis, Sérgio Britto	Sérgio Britto	3:27
12.	"Dívidas" (Debts)	Branco Mello, Arnaldo Antunes	Branco Mello	3:08
13.	"O Quê" (What)	Arnaldo Antunes	Paulo Miklos	5:40

== Personnel ==
- Paulo Miklos - Lead vocals on tracks 5, 6, 9 and 13, backing vocals on tracks 1–4, 7, 8 and 10–12, rhythm guitar
- Branco Mello - Lead vocals on tracks 1, 3, 8 and 12, backing vocals on tracks 2, 4, 5, 7, 9-11 and 13, bass on tracks 1, 2, 4–7, 9-11 and 13
- Sérgio Britto - Lead vocals on tracks 2, 4, 7, 10, and 11, backing vocals on tracks 1, 5, 9 and 13, keyboards on tracks 1, 5, 6, 9, 10, 11 and 13, bass on tracks 3, 8 and 12
- Tony Bellotto - Lead guitar

=== Session musician ===
- Mario Fabre - Drums
