= Nheengatu (album) =

Studio album by Titãs
- Released: May 12, 2014
- Recorded: 2014 at Estúdio Trama in São Paulo, Brazil. Mixed at Estúdio Tambor and mastered at Magic Master (both in Rio de Janeiro, Brazil)
- Genre: Rock, punk rock
- Label: Som Livre
- Producer: Rafael Ramos

Titãs chronology
Cabeça Dinossauro ao Vivo 2012 (2012)	Nheengatu (2014)	Nheengatu ao Vivo (2015)

Singles from Nheengatu
- 1. "Fardado" Released: April 28, 2014

Nheengatu is the fourteenth studio album by Brazilian rock band Titãs, released on May 12, 2014. It is their first studio album with session drummer Mario Fabre, who replaced Charles Gavin, their last with vocalist and guitarist Paulo Miklos, who left the then quartet in 2016, and also their first release through Som Livre and producer Rafael Ramos. The album was dedicated to Rachel Salém, Miklos' wife who died on July 23, 2013, of lung cancer.

The album is considered a back-to-the-roots work, with Titãs departing from the soft, romantic and electronic arrangements from the previous album, Sacos Plásticos, and returning to the heavier sound of their Cabeça Dinossauro and Titanomaquia times. The lyrics are also more bitter, dealing with topics such as pedophilia, police brutality, violence against women, sexual, racial and social discrimination.

In 2014, the album was nominated for the Latin Grammy Award for Best Brazilian Rock Album.

== Background ==
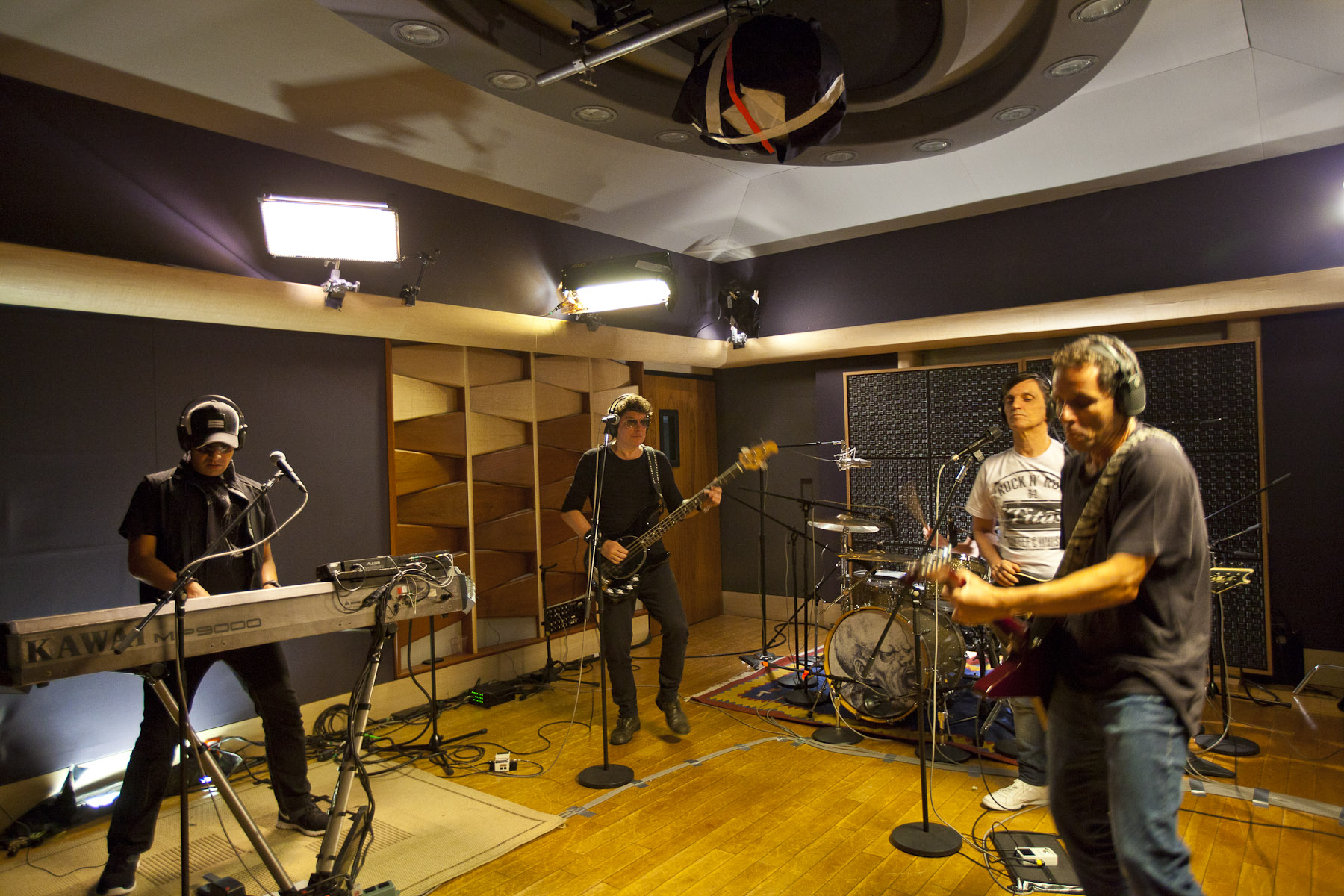
Titãs in 2013 shooting some images of them recording "Cabeça Dinossauro" for Vai que Dá Certo in São Paulo. The continuous performances of Cabeça Dinossauro's songs would strongly influence Nheengatu's sound.

The first mention of the album dates back to as early as May 2010, just after Charles Gavin left the band. When asked about the future projects of the band, keyboardist, vocalist and bassist Sérgio Britto stated that Titãs would prepare a new album in 2011.

Since then, nothing was said. In the 2012-14 period, Titãs carried out their Futuras Instalações (Future Installments) and Titãs Inédito (Titãs Unseen) Tours, in which, apart from hits, they performed several new songs, for testing purposes. Some of those songs would be featured in a new album then expected for a 2012-13 release. Indeed, ten out of the 14 tracks off the album were already performed live during the aforementioned tours. Some tracks, such as "Morto Vivo" (Living Dead), which had influences of ska and guitarrada, were left out of the album. That tour was succeeded by the Cabeça Dinossauro ao Vivo 2012 Tour and the celebration of the band's 30th anniversary.

In March 2013, new comments suggested that the band was indeed preparing new material. While recording a new video for their song "Cabeça Dinossauro" as part of the soundtrack for the Brazilian film Vai que Dá Certo, they informed Mônica Bergamo that they would start essaying for their new album, then expected for the second half of that year. The Cabeça Dinossauro anniversary tour played a major role in defining the direction of the album. At the time, Britto commented:

It'll be a mixture between Cabeça [Dinossauro] (1986) and Õ Blésq Blom (1989), as it was possible, for us to guide ourselves, for us to have a aesthetic target. The fact that we played songs from Cabeça in its entirety obviously helps us to recover a kind of aesthetic that we worked so much and did so well back then, and I think it'll help us build this new thing.

In that interview, the band also informed they had the intention of releasing an independent album.

In November 2013, vocalist and guitarist Paulo Miklos confirmed the band would begin works on a new album in April or May 2014. At the occasion, he said the album would be "heavy, dirty, and mean". Around the same time, Sérgio Britto stated that the band asked Andreas Kisser to produce the album, but he couldn't accept for conflicting schedules with Sepultura. Later, Britto confirmed the album would be released in early May and that the band was already recording songs on studio.

In March, radio Globo FM informed that the album would be released in April via Som Livre and would feature 14 tracks. On April 16, the band announced at their official Facebook page that the album was ready and would be released in May. On 28 April, they announced the title, cover and release date for the album.

== Concept ==
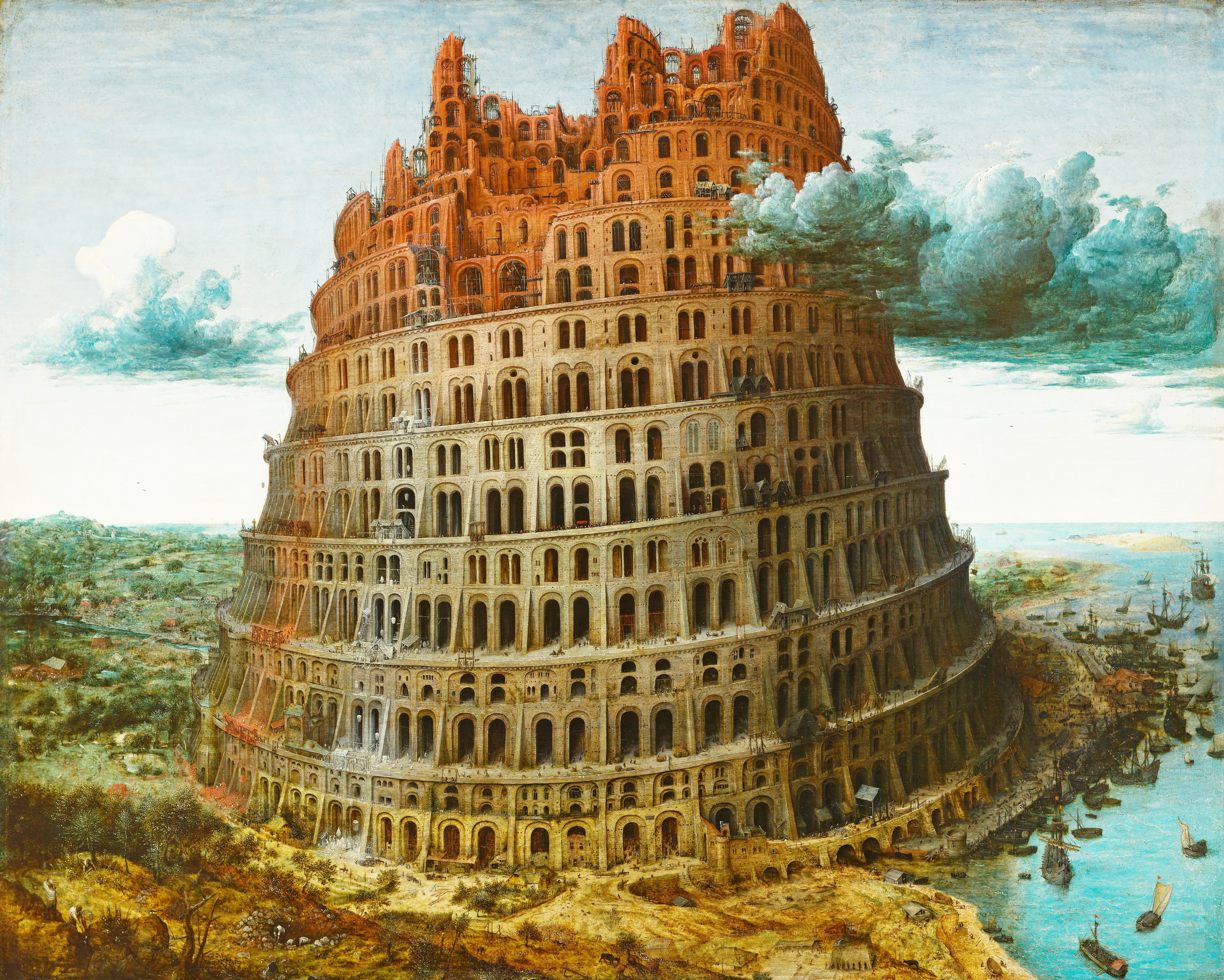
The Tower of Babel, Pieter Bruegel's painting that inspired the album cover art.

The name of the album means "General Language" and is a reference to the Nheengatu language. As for the cover, it is based on the painting De "Kleine" Toren van Babel, by Pieter Bruegel. It depicts the Tower of Babel, a mythical tower built by men to reach the heavens, but destroyed by God's rage, which resulted in they being spread over the Earth, causing new languages to develop, thus making it difficult for different peoples to understand each other. The cover art was chosen after the album was done, via a research made by Britto.

At their official Facebook announcement, the band explained:

By attempting to take an instant picture of current Brazil, both ideas oppose well: one word (and a language) of understanding to try to explain a world of misunderstanding.

In one of the first occasions in which the band sessioned with its new formation (four members, session drummer and no other supporting musicians), Miklos came up with a manifesto of sorts, explaining how Titãs should be from that moment on. Each member "understood it in a different way", but the band ended up finding a common point. From there on, according to Britto, the band started to work on two ideas: "that we were going to make a raw rock album and that it should contain an explicit brazilianity".

Commenting on the influence of Cabeça Dinossauro on the album, guitarist Tony Bellotto explained that the moment of Brasil at the time of the album's preparation could be compared to the moment Brasil experienced at the time of Cabeça Dinossauro (1986):

At that time, the country experienced a period of inquietude, which gave us a feeling that things were getting a little out of control. The fact that the 2012 Cabeça Dinossauro tour was so successful ended up bringing the certainty that we should make a heavy album. We decided to radicalize, not to make radio-friendly songs.

However, he rejects that Nheengatu is a "back to the roots" album. "People speak through stereotypes. We didn't get back to the roots, much to the contrary. What they mean is that we did an album as relevant and seminal as some of our best past works, like Cabeça Dinossauro and Titanomaquia."

== Lyrical themes and composing ==
"Mensageiro da Desgraça" was based on impressions of the band about homeless and indigenous people, seen as pariahs by society. Episodes such as the assassination of the native Galdino Jesus dos Santos were sources of inspiration as well. "República dos Bananas" was co-written by bassist/vocalist Branco Mello, cartoonist Angeli, o actor and director Hugo Possolo and Titãs' ex-session guitarist Emerson Villani. Its lyrics cover many characters that form Brazilian society. The song received a promotional video made with illustrations by Angeli himself, including depictions of himself, Titãs' members and the people mentioned in the lyrics.

In order to write "Fala, Renata", Bellotto conceived a fictional female character inspired by early MPB songs that were named after the women covered in their own lyrics. In this case, the lyrics are about a woman that talks too much - according to Britto, who also wrote the song, it criticizes times in which "people talk a lot but little is said". Miklos, the third and final author of the song, says the lyrics pay some "tributes". One of its verses says "João Luiz... Cala essa boca, porra!" (Portuguese for "João Luiz... Shut the fuck up!"). João Luiz is the real name of singer and guitarist Lobão. When asked if he believed that was a message for him, Lobão wrote the following note on his tumblr:

I don't have the slightest musical/artistic interest nor personal link with these gentlemen. And if they want to shut me up, they won't make it with little songs of pseudo-angry fefecas. (Note: the adjective "fefeca" does not actually exist in Portuguese; thus, there is no possible translation for that.) Only in Brazil can we conceive a tiny little band composed of senile and flatter universilosers (Note: The original word here is "universotários", a portmanteau of "universitário" (university student) and "otário" (loser).) with a flimsy and precarious musical varnish selfname itself: titans.... (Note: "titans" is the translation of the band's name Titãs.)

"Cadáver Sobre Cadáver" resulted from a partnership between Miklos and the band's ex-vocalist Arnaldo Antunes. It deals with the finiteness of life. It was based on two different texts in which they were working. It was the last song to be worked on in studio. Musically, the song features some elements of indigenous music which, according to Britto, were also present in Cabeça Dinossauro's title track.

"Canalha", the only cover, was made with approval of its author, Walter Franco, who asked "the heaviest possible guitar". The suggestion to cover it came from Britto at the backstage of a show. Since the track was created when the Brazilian military government faced its decline, the band felt it would fit the album's purpose. Mello, who sings in this track, opted for doing it in a softer way than the original one, as if it was a "veiled pain".

"Pedofilia" and "Flores Para Ela" are about violence against children and women, respectively. The first was another suggestion of Britto, and it found its inspiration in American singer Suzanne Vega's hit "Luka". In both of them, the band wanted to write the lyrics as if the people directly involved in such issues were speaking.

"Chegada ao Brasil" was created through a partnership between Mello and theater director Aderbal Freire, with whom he and Newton Moreno (another director) worked on a play called Jacinta, which had a passage about an arrival in Brazil. (Note: "Chegada ao Brasil" translates as arrival in Brazil.) The track also features some Brazilian elements that the band wanted to add to the album. "Eu Me Sinto Bem" features lyrics that fall out of the general scope of the album, so the band "compensated" this by adding frevo and ska rhythms to keep its brazilianity. "Não Pode" was inspired by orders given by Britto to his children and his dog, many of which he admits to have no meaning at all, being mere exercises of power.

"Senhor" is a "reverse prayer" in which a man asks God for things that aren't normally asked for in prayers. It is a criticism to the exploitation of people from certain religious groups, and to their interference on scientific matters. "Baião de Dois" was named like this by Bellotto because it was based on two sentences related to samba: "O Mundo é um Moinho" (The World is a Windmill), a verse by Cartola; and "A Vida é um Buraco" (Life is a Hole), the title of a Pixinguinha show. The track also cites other Brazilian songs. "Quem São os Animais" deals with the habit of using animal names to offend other people, such as "veado" or "macaco". (Note: "veado" (deer) and "macaco" (monkey) are common words used in Brazil to offend homosexual men and black people, respectively.)

== Critical reception ==
Professional ratings
Review scores
Source	Rating
Rolling Stone Brasil	4/5 stars
Omelete	4/5 stars
O Globo	(favorável)
UOL Música	(favorable)
O Estado de S. Paulo	(favorable)
Regis Tadeu	(favorable)
89 FM a Rádio Rock	(favorable)

Nheengatu received generally positive reviews from music critics, with all of them drawing comparisons with the band's older albums (specially Cabeça Dinossauro, Jesus Não Tem Dentes no País dos Banguelas and Titanomaquia).

Bernardo Araujo from O Globo labeled the album as "great" and called it "one of the most well performed Titãs' albums, and certainly the best in many years". He also praised the album's sound, which is, according to him, reminiscent of Cabeça Dinossauro, Jesus não Tem Dentes no País dos Banguelas, Tudo Ao Mesmo Tempo Agora and Titanomaquia. Commenting on the lyrics, he said: "Pedophilia, prejudice, racism, poverty, drugs... there's no thorny topic that doesn't pass through this Nheengatu album's lyrics."

Leonardo Rodrigues from UOL Música said the album "might be the last great Titãs album - or just the first of a new phase". Commenting on the band's line-up, he stated the group found in it "their best studio album since the 1995 Domingo." He praised the heaviness of "Fardado" (which he saw as an upgrade on "Polícia"), "Pedofilia", "Baião de Dois" and "Senhor".

Julio Maria of O Estado de S. Paulo labeled the album as "strong" and praised the album for its unobvious metrics, while the melodies "demand two auditions, when they penetrate forever". He also stated that "here, Titãs take down a prejudice that was growing strong with every album released by an eighties' band: the idea that the strength or rock and roll had its days numbered, and that nobody above their 35s could make it as they did at their twenties." Claudio Dirani, at 89 FM a Rádio Rock, called Nheengatu the "best national rock album in the last 20 years".

André Rrodrigues of the Brazilian edition of Rolling Stone considered Nheengatu Titãs' best album in years and also heard similarities with Cabeça Dinossauro and Titanomaquia. He concluded his reviews by saying: "Nheengatu is a punch in the face from the beginning to the end".

Regis Tadeu at Yahoo! News Brazil called Nheengatu a "beautiful album, specially coming from a group that had reached the bottom of the well in artistic terms with their two previous albums". He also pointed the absence of ballads and called its words "straight and aggressive".

Omelete's Kaluan Bernardo called the album "good, sincere and urgent" and stated that Titãs are the "true survivors" (in reference to the line "quem vive sobrevive", from the track "Cadáver Sobre Cadáver", which translates as "who lives survives") for them being still active even after losing half its members and being neglected after Sacos Plásticos.

== Track listing ==
No.	Title	Writer(s)	Lead vocals	Length
1.	"Fardado" (Uniformed)	Britto, Paulo Miklos	Sérgio Britto	2:28
2.	"Mensageiro da Desgraça" (Messenger of Disgrace)	Miklos, Tony Bellotto, Britto	Miklos	3:29
3.	"República dos Bananas" (Republic of the Fools (Note: A word play on "República das Bananas" (Republic of the Bananas) and the fact that "banana" in Portuguese means both the fruit or a fool, a loser.))	Mello, Angeli, Hugo Possolo, Emerson Villani	Branco Mello	2:02
4.	"Fala, Renata" (Speak, Renata)	Bellotto, Miklos, Britto	Britto	3:01
5.	"Cadáver Sobre Cadáver" (Corpse on Top of Corpse)	Miklos, Arnaldo Antunes	Miklos	2:55
6.	"Canalha (Walter Franco cover)" (Scumbag)	Walter Franco	Mello	3:16
7.	"Pedofilia" (Pedophilia)	Britto, Miklos, Bellotto	Britto	2:02
8.	"Chegada ao Brasil (Terra à Vista)" (Arrival in Brazil (Land in Sight))	Mello, Villani, Aderbal Freire	Mello	2:22
9.	"Eu Me Sinto Bem" (I Feel Good)	Bellotto, Britto, Miklos	Britto	2:04
10.	"Flores Pra Ela" (Flowers for Her)	Britto, Mario Fabre	Miklos	3:31
11.	"Não Pode" (It's Not Permitted To)	Britto	Britto	2:14
12.	"Senhor" (Lord)	Bellotto	Mello	2:51
13.	"Baião de Dois (Note: Lit. "Baião of Two", a Northeastern Brazil typical dish)"	Miklos	Miklos	2:43
14.	"Quem São os Animais?" (Who Are the Animals?)	Britto	Britto	2:21
Total length:				37:12

== Personnel ==
- Paulo Miklos – Lead vocals on tracks 2, 5, 10 and 13, backing vocals on tracks 1, 3, 4, 6–9, 11, 12 and 14, rhythm guitar on all tracks
- Branco Mello – Lead vocals on tracks 3, 6, 8 and 12, backing vocals on tracks 1, 2, 4, 5, 7, 9–11, 13 and 14, bass on all tracks except 3, 6, 8, 12
- Sérgio Britto – Lead vocals on tracks 1, 4, 7, 9, 11 and 14, backing vocals on tracks 2, 5, 8, 10 and 13, keyboards on all tracks, bass on tracks 3, 6, 8, 12, graphic project and conception (art and project)
- Tony Bellotto – Lead guitar on all tracks

Session member

- Mario Fabre - Drums on all tracks

=== Technical staff ===
- Rafael Ramos - producing
- Jorge Guerreiro - recording
- Vitor Farias - mixing
- Ricardo Garcia - mastering
- Cristina Doria - executive producer
- André Rola - graphic design
