= Igreja =

1987 single by Titãs

Single by Titãs

from the album Cabeça Dinossauro
- Released: 1987
- Genre: Post-punk
- Length: 2:47
- Label: WEA
- Songwriter(s): Nando Reis
- Producer(s): Liminha, Vitor Farias and Pena Schmidt

Titãs singles chronology
"Família" (1987)	"Igreja" (1987)	"Lugar Nenhum" (1988)

"Igreja" ("Church") is a single by Brazilian rock band Titãs, released in 1986, as part of their Cabeça Dinossauro album.

== Lyrics and composition ==
According to songwriter and then bassist and vocalist Nando Reis, the song was written on the acoustic guitar at his mother's house in the district of Butantã, São Paulo as a protest to the censorship against Jean-Luc Godard's film Je vous salue, Marie: "there was a boycott against it and Roberto Carlos, of whom I am a big fan, wrote something in support of the boycott. That, in a certain way, was against my ideals, the matter of liberty. That motivated me to write the song."

By the time of the album's release, Reis said:

"I had a Catholic education, studied in a parochial school, and because of that I have a good degree of anger towards the Church, I don't trust it. It's an organized institution that, in some political moments, has a very worthy position - but that's not what I'm talking about in the song Igreja. Religiously it is something I lost entirely. I don't believe in God. I don't pray."

== Reception within the band ==
It was one of the last songs to be selected for the album and it stirred controversy among the members themselves - vocalist Arnaldo Antunes, at first, didn't want to record it and would even leave the stage sometimes when the song was performed live. When the members had a meeting at vocalist Branco Mello's apartment to discuss the album's repertoire, vocalist, bassist and saxophonist Paulo Miklos also opposed the song's inclusion,. but soon changed his mind as the band performed it live.

Antunes, on the other hand, said "the song is against the Church as the institution, but at the same time I have a problem, for me it is difficult to sing that I don't have a religion, because I do. And the Church has great contributions to the history of men, to the arts, take Botticelli for instance."

== Personnel ==
Per the Cabeça Dinossauro liner notes:

- Nando Reis - lead vocals
- Arnaldo Antunes - backing vocals
- Branco Mello - backing vocals
- Sérgio Britto - backing vocals
- Marcelo Fromer - lead guitar
- Tony Bellotto - rhythm guitar
- Paulo Miklos - bass
- Charles Gavin - drums
