= Antes de Você =

Single by Titãs

from the album Sacos Plásticos
- Released: May 7, 2009
- Genre: Alternative rock
- Label: Arsenal Music
- Songwriter(s): Paulo Miklos
- Producer(s): Rick Bonadio

Titãs singles chronology
"O Inferno São Os Outros" (2006)	"Antes de Você" (2009)	"Porque Eu Sei que É Amor" (2009)

"Antes de Você" is a single by Titãs, released on May 7, 2009. It is composed and sung by Paulo Miklos.

Regarding the song, he stated that "most of the times, we create defenses and recover. Many of us have to live with it for the rest of our lives. But in the case of this song, we definitely surrender to it. There's no more powerful influence than love!".

The song was used in the Rede Globo's telenovela Caras & Bocas (Faces & Mouths), as the character Vicente's theme.

== Music video ==
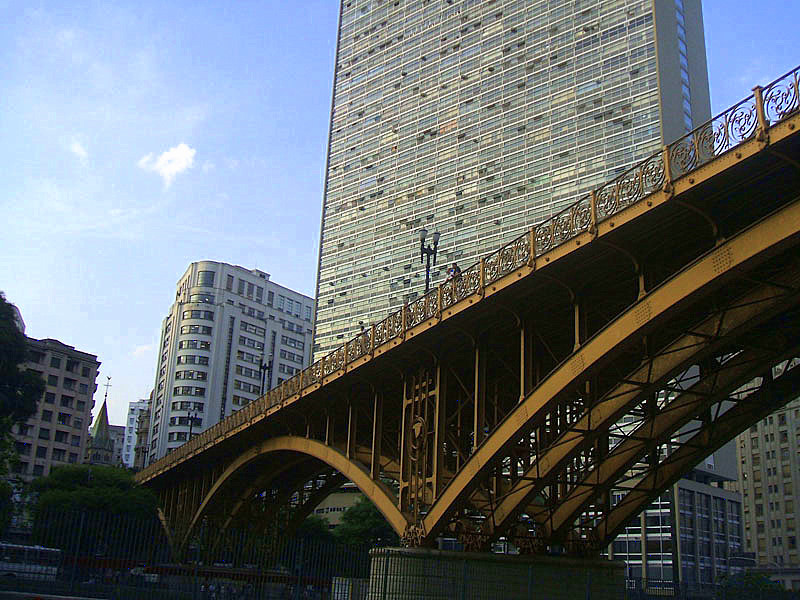
Santa Ifigênia Bridge, where the video was shot.

A music video for the single was shot on June 3, 2009, under Santa Ifigênia Bridge in downtown São Paulo. The video features the band performing there, surrounded by dozens of people wearing plastic bags (with various kinds of faces painted on them, including a copy of the head displayed at Cabeça Dinossauro's cover) on their heads (a reference to the album title, translated as "plastic bags"). During the guitar solo by Bellotto, fans "accompanied" him by "playing" air guitar.

== Personnel ==
- Paulo Miklos - Lead vocals, backing vocals and lead guitar
- Branco Mello - Bass guitar
- Tony Bellotto - Rhythm guitar
- Sérgio Britto - Keyboards
- Charles Gavin - Drums
- Rick Bonadio - Programming, keyboards, electric guitar and acoustic guitar
