= Titãs – 84 94 Um =

Titãs - 84 94 Um

Compilation album by Titãs
- Released: 1994
- Recorded: 1984–1994
- Genre: Alternative rock, post-punk, new wave, punk rock
- Label: WEA
- Producer: Jack Endino

Titãs chronology
Titãs - 84 94 Um (1994)	Titãs - 84 94 Dois (1994)

Titãs – 84 94 Um is the first compilation album released by Brazilian rock band Titãs, and also the first featuring the main hits of the band since their first album, Titãs, released in 1984, until their seventh one, Titanomaquia, released in 1993.

== Track listing ==
#	Title	Length	Music
1	Sonífera Ilha	2:56	Branco Mello, Marcelo Fromer, Tony Bellotto, Ciro Pessoa and Carlos Barmack
2	Toda Cor	3:24	Marcelo Fromer, Ciro Pessoa and Carlos Barmack
3	Não Vou Me Adaptar	2:45	Arnaldo Antunes
4	Família	3:32	Toni Bellotto and Arnaldo Antunes
5	Homem Primata	3:27	Marcelo Fromer, Ciro Pessoa, Nando Reis and Sérgio Britto
6	O Quê	5:38	Arnaldo Antunes
7	Comida	2:59	Marcelo Fromer, Arnaldo Antunes and Sérgio Britto
8	Diversão	4:45	Nando Reis and Sérgio Britto
9	Go Back (remix)	3:40	Sérgio Britto and Torquato Neto
10	Marvin (Patches)	4:15	R. Dunbar and G. N. Johnson, version by Nando Reis and Sérgio Britto
11	Miséria	4:28	Arnaldo Antunes, Sérgio Britto and Paulo Miklos
12	Flores	3:27	Tony Bellotto, Sérgio Britto, Charles Gavin and Paulo Miklos
13	O Pulso	2:44	Marcelo Fromer, Toni Bellotto and Arnaldo Antunes
14	Deus E O Diabo	3:28	Nando Reis, Sérgio Britto and Paulo Miklos
15	Clitóris	3:46	Titãs
16	Não É Por Não Falar	2:31	Titãs
17	Hereditário	2:05	Titãs and Arnaldo Antunes
