= Família =

Single by Titãs

from the album Cabeça Dinossauro
- Released: 1987
- Genre: Reggae
- Length: 3:32
- Label: WEA
- Songwriters: Tony Bellotto and Arnaldo Antunes
- Producers: Liminha, Vitor Farias and Pena Schmidt

Titãs singles chronology
"Homem Primata'" (1987)	"Família" (1987)	"Igreja" (1987)

"Família" is the seventh single by Brazilian rock band Titãs, released in 1987. The song is about the everyday issues of a family.

It was once covered by Molejo on their 1998 album Família. The song was featured on the Rede Manchete telenovela Corpo Santo.

In 2013, bass player and vocalist Nando Reis (now an ex-member) recorded a new version of the song with his sons Théo and Sebastião. The new version was used as the opening theme of the 2013 season of Rede Globo's Malhação. While Sebastião played acoustic guitar, Nando Reis and Théo sang, sharing the same microphone, like The Beatles used to do, "in order to create a more familiar atmosphere", according to Reis.

== Personnel ==
- Nando Reis — lead vocals, bass
- Arnaldo Antunes — backing vocals
- Branco Mello — backing vocals
- Paulo Miklos — backing vocals
- Marcelo Fromer — lead guitar
- Tony Bellotto — rhythm and lead guitar
- Sérgio Britto — keyboards
- Charles Gavin — drums
- Liminha — rhythm guitar
