= André Jung =

André Jung may refer to:

- André Jung (actor) (born 1953), Luxembourgish theatre and film actor
- André Jung (musician) (born 1961), Brazilian drummer and journalist
