= Televisão =

Studio album by Titãs
- Released: June 1985
- Recorded: 1985
- Genre: Post-punk, new wave
- Label: WEA
- Producer: Lulu Santos

Titãs chronology
Titãs (1984)	Televisão (1985)	Cabeça Dinossauro (1986)

Singles from Televisão
- 1. "Televisão" Released: 1985; 2. "Insensível" Released: 1985

Televisão (Television) is the second studio album by Brazilian rock band Titãs, released in 1985 via WEA. It is the first album to feature drummer Charles Gavin, following André Jung's departure in the previous year.

Televisão was conceived to mimic a television, in that each track represented a channel, i.e. tracks would navigate between musical genres just like different kinds of programs could be watched by switching channels. The cover picture wasn't edited so it would look like a TV screenshot; the band was effectively filmed by a camera and the images were broadcast to a television, and the photographer took a picture of its screen.

It was the band's first album produced by Lulu Santos, who was chosen in order to create a different sound from other Brazilian rock bands of that time.

In 1998, when asked about the destiny of the character Dona Nenê from the homonymous song, the band said "it's a mystery as of today" and that "no one knows where she is". During a performance of "Massacre" at Marília Gabriela's program, politician Jânio Quadros protested, saying "that wansn't music" and that it was "crap".

The album sold a total of 100,000 copies, but only 25,000 initially, which was considered a "relative failure" by the band. In a 2006 article, vocalist and keyboardist Sérgio Britto commented that tracks such as "Televisão", "Massacre", "Pavimentação" and "Autonomia" hinted the musical direction the band would take in their next album, Cabeça Dinossauro.

== Track listing ==
No.	Title	Lyrics	Lead vocals	Length
1.	"Televisão" (Television)	Arnaldo Antunes, Marcelo Fromer and Tony Bellotto	Antunes	3:40
2.	"Insensível" (Insensitive)	Sérgio Britto	Britto	4:25
3.	"Pavimentação" (Pavement)	Paulo Miklos and Antunes	Miklos	2:25
4.	"Dona Nenê" (Mrs. Nenê)	Branco Mello and Ciro Pessoa	Mello	3:35
5.	"Pra Dizer Adeus" (To Say Goodbye)	Bellotto and Reis	Reis	5:00
6.	"Não Vou Me Adaptar" (I Won't Adapt Myself)	Antunes	Antunes	2:45
7.	"Tudo Vai Passar" (Everything Will Pass)	Britto and Fromer	Britto	3:40
8.	"Sonho com Você" (I Dream About You)	Mello, Britto and Pessoa	Mello	3:05
9.	"O Homem Cinza" (The Grey Man)	Reis	Reis	3:40
10.	"Autonomia" (Autonomy)	Miklos, Antunes and Fromer	Miklos	2:55
11.	"Massacre" (slaughter)	Britto and Fromer	Miklos, Britto, Mello and Antunes	1:40

== Personnel ==
- Arnaldo Antunes - vocals
- Branco Mello - Vocals
- Nando Reis - Bass, vocals
- Charles Gavin - drums, Timpani
- Sérgio Britto - Keyboards, vocals
- Paulo Miklos - Vocals, keyboards on tracks 2, 6 and 7, bass on track 5.
- Marcelo Fromer - Rhythm & Lead Guitar
- Tony Bellotto - Lead & Rhythm Guitar

Guest performances

- Lulu Santos - Lead guitar on track 5, bass on track 4.
- Leo Gandelman - Saxophone on tracks 1 and 3.

== Singles ==
=== "Televisão" ===
"Televisão" was released as the second single by Titãs in 1985. It would be later used as the credit music for Beyond Citizen Kane. Its chorus refers to someone named Cride - such person did exist; he was Euclides Gomes dos Santos, a close old friend of comedian Ronald Golias. Even though the song was released in 1985, it wasn't until 2014 that he met the band personally, when they performed in his hometown São Carlos - he would die in the next year, at the age of 88.

The song is "a critical view of the screen present in our daily lives in a manner at times suffocating" and it debates the role of television in one's dumbing down process, though allowing one to notice one is a victim of this process.

The song is the opening theme of Tá no Ar, of Rede Globo, since its debut season in 2014. From Season 4 on, in 2017, a cover by Lulu Santos was implemented.

=== "Insensível" ===
"Insensível"

Single by Titãs
- Released: 1985
- Genre: Post-punk
- Label: WEA
- Songwriter: Sérgio Britto
- Producer: Lulu Santos

Titãs singles chronology
"Televisão" (1985)	"Insensível" (1985)	"AA UU" (1986)

"Insensível" was released as the third single by the band in 1985. An acoustic version of the song was later recorded and released on Volume Dois.

The music video of "Insensível" shows the band performing on top of a building, with TV monitors behind them. From the half of the video on, a woman (presumably a geisha, given her very white face, red lips and Japanese eyes) starts appearing in the monitors.

=== Track listing ===
No.	Title	Lyrics	Length
1.	"Insensível" (Insensitive)	Sérgio Britto	4:25
