= Flores (song) =

Single by Titãs

from the album Õ Blésq Blom
- Released: 1989
- Genre: Alternative rock, power pop
- Label: WEA
- Songwriters: Tony Bellotto, Sérgio Britto, Charles Gavin and Paulo Miklos
- Producer: Liminha

Titãs singles chronology
"Pipi Popô" / "A Marcha do Demo" (1988)	"Flores" (1989)	"Miséria" (1989)

"Flores" (Flowers) is the ninth single by Titãs. It was released in 1989 on WEA. A completely reworked acoustic version of the song was later featured on their Acústico MTV live album, with Branco Mello sharing vocals with Marisa Monte. The chorus riff (used in the opening of the Acústico MTV version) was composed by drummer Charles Gavin, one of the song's co-writers.

== Music video ==
The music video of "Flores" won the 1990 MTV Video Music Brasil award. It shows the band performing the song among flowers and shadows that float around the members.

== Track listing ==
No.	Title	Music	Lead vocals	Length
1.	"Flores" (Flowers)	Tony Bellotto, Sérgio Britto, Charles Gavin and Paulo Miklos	Branco Mello	3:27
