= Léo Gandelman =

Brazilian musician (born 1956)

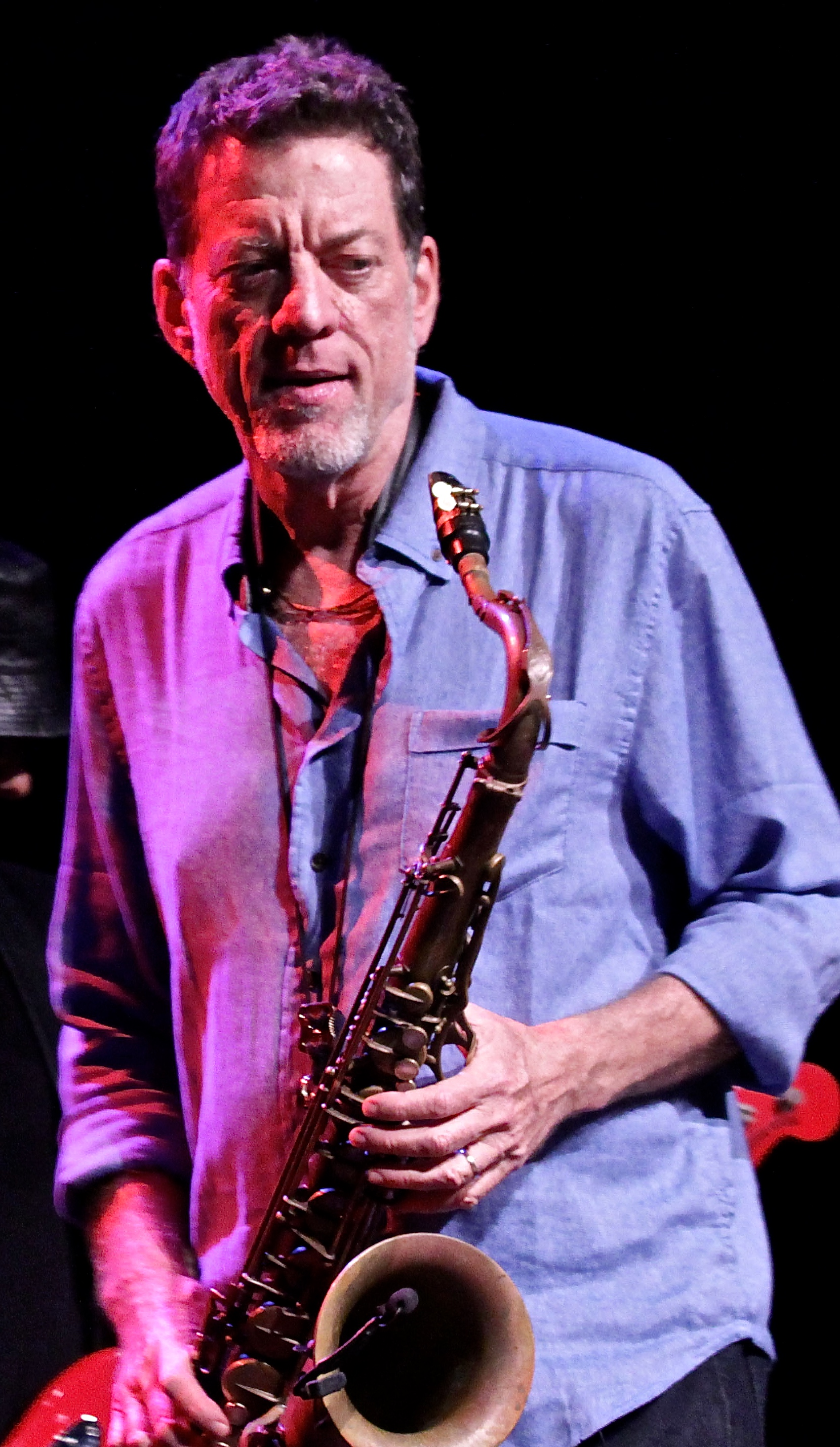
Léo Gandelman in 2016.

Léo Gandelman (born Leonardo Gandelman; August 10, 1956, in Rio de Janeiro) is a Brazilian saxophonist, composer and producer. He has played with Lulu Santos, and guest appeared in Titãs' single "Televisão". He is also known for composing soundtracks for Brazilian telenovelas, films and TV series.

Although he spent his childhood studying classical music, he ended up furthering studies on saxophone, composition and arrangements at Berklee College of Music. Gandelman has a son, Miguel Gandelman, who is also a musician.
