= Cabeça Dinossauro =

Studio album by Titãs
- Released: 25 June 1986
- Recorded: March – April 1986
- Studios: Estúdio nas Nuvens, Rio de Janeiro
- Genres: Punk rock, post-punk, funk rock, reggae
- Length: 38:41
- Label: WEA
- Producers: Liminha, Vitor Farias, Pena Schmidt

Titãs chronology
Televisão (1985)	Cabeça Dinossauro (1986)	Jesus não Tem Dentes no País dos Banguelas (1987)

Singles from Cabeça Dinossauro
- 1. "AA UU" Released: 1986; 2. "Polícia" Released: 1986; 3. "Homem Primata" Released: 1987; 4. "O Quê" Released: 1987; 5. "Bichos Escrotos" Released: 1987; 6. "Família" Released: 1987; 7. "Igreja" Released: 1987

Cabeça Dinossauro (Brazilian Portuguese: [kaˈbesɐ dʒinoˈsawɾu]; 'Dinosaur Head') is the third studio album by Brazilian rock band Titãs, released on 25 June 1986. It was their first album produced by Liminha, who was the director of WEA at the time of the album's recording, which facilitated the relationship between band and label; and their first gold album, certified as such in December 1986.

== Background ==
In February 1986, before a show in São Paulo, vocalist Branco Mello told newspaper O Estado de S. Paulo that the then upcoming album would have a "more dry and raw rock" and a "more primitive, more visceral" sound.

Vocalist Arnaldo Antunes and guitarist Tony Bellotto's arrest for drug possession in 1985 (and the former's subsequent three-year house arrest sentence); the "relative failure" of previous album Televisão; and the will by the band to take a heavier direction influenced the music on this album. But they did not decide to go punk overnight. The ingredients, according to keyboardist and vocalist Sérgio Britto, were already present in the band. Bellotto saw "Massacre", from the previous album, as an indicator of this heavier sound that would come.

He also says the band already showed signs of this new sound live, claiming that "time showed that this subgenre was in our DNA, which is why 'Cabeça' is a big feature, with all this questioning, the criticism that we see in the lyrics, the punk, but also the reggae, funk. I think in this album we found the way.

Besides, then drummer Charles Gavin considered the troubled moments lived both by the band and by Brazil at that time were also influencing factors:

There was the moment of Brazil which was drawing itself much problematic, a military dictatorship still in the process of breaking down, Tancredo's death. The mood was very delusional, a dystopian scenery. And there was also our moment as a band. We were emerging from "Televisão", our second release, miscomprehended by the label [Warner], which was not well worked. This caused a certain distaste, a certain skepticism towards the music, the career. We came upon the album angry at the industry, the label, everyone.

Co-producer Pena Schmidt saw the album as "the moment of truth. Titãs had crisis between surrendering to phonographic perfection or to the rebellious statement. There the result balances track by track."

The band was also looking to establish a clearer identity, something they hadn't achieved up until then with an unusual line-up of eight members, several vocalists and no crooner. One evidence was a show they did in a festival celebrating Gilberto Gil's 20th career anniversary. When they went onto the stage, right after Os Paralamas do Sucesso, Gil introduced them saying that "Paralamas go on stage as a trio and their sound is reminiscent of a train. Titãs go in eight [members] and sound like a little music box".

Besides all that, there was also an intention by the band to reproduce in studio the energy they believe they had live.

== Production and concept ==
Although Titãs themselves had criticized the work of producer Liminha, labeling him as a "pasteurizator", he was ultimately hired to produce Cabeça Dinossauro. The musical material for the album was ready before the band got into the studio. The first track to be recorded was the single "AA UU". The last one was "O Quê". "O Que" and "Família" were the only songs to have their arrangements significantly changed.

It was recorded and mixed in one month. Its demo was recorded in just two days at a studio in the Pompeia neighborhood of São Paulo. The title Cabeça Dinossauro (Head Dinosaur) refers to the duality between rational (head) and primitive (dinosaur).

The album's front and back covers were taken from sketches by Leonardo da Vinci: "The Expression a howling Man" and "Grotesque Head", respectively. Both acetates were brought straight out of Louvre by a friend of vocalist and keyboardist Sérgio Britto's father. They replaced small reproductions the band had but could not use for the album due to low quality. He would say in 2006 that "the first 30,000 copies of the album were made in a mat and porous paper, much more expensive than the ordinary one. A gesture of generosity by André Midani, then president of Warner, which gave us total support before, during and after the recording sessions, complying with almost every of our requests." It was one of the first Brazilian rock album covers not to feature a picture of the artist.

== Song information ==
The title track was conceived during a bus trip. Vocalist and saxophonist Paulo Miklos showed his colleagues a tape with folk music by some Xingus. Over that base, Branco Mello improvised the verses "Cabeça dinossauro/Cabeça dinossauro/Cabeça, cabeça, cabeça dinossauro" and soon the lyrics were all done. The percussion was performed by Liminha. After several elaborated attempts, he improvised with the walls, the floor and the pillars of the studio, and the "trance" performance was approved by all.

"Estado Violência", written by Gavin, was initially offered to his previous band Ira!. Reis helped him structure the song, but not as much as to be credited as co-writer. The lyrics, however, just like "Polícia", were also inspired by his two bandmates' arrest, more especially by the power the government has to "judge what you do at your home, with your body".

The vocals of "A Face do Destruidor" was recorded over the base played backwards. According to Britto, "when we recorded, we had to think that it would be listened to that way".

Some of Bellotto's solos were played with the musician alternating between the guitar pick and a big ring he was using. That way, he could play and simultaneously obtain percussive effects from his instrument.

=== "Homem Primata" ===
"Homem Primata"

Single by Titãs

from the album Cabeça Dinossauro
- B-side: "Polícia (dance remix)" and "Polícia II"
- Released: 1987
- Genre: Post-punk
- Label: WEA
- Songwriters: Marcelo Fromer, Ciro Pessoa, Nando Reis and Sérgio Britto
- Producers: Liminha, Vitor Farias and Pena Schmidt

Titãs singles chronology
"Polícia" (1986)	"Homem Primata" (1987)	"Família" (1987)

"Homem Primata" was released in 1987 as the sixth single by the band and it featured a reworked version of "Polícia" and a dance remix of the same song as B-sides. The song is one of the few by the band to feature English lyrics

==== Music video ====
At first, the music video shows black & white shots of the band walking among a crowd, alternating with images of pre-historical men. Then, in now colorful shots, the band starts tagging a 1950s truck with graffiti (illustrations include the anarchist symbol) before they start performing the song on board of it while someone drives it through the center of São Paulo. This ride is alternated with images of the band performing inside a cage, with people watching from outside.

==== Track listing ====
No.	Title	Writer(s)	Length
1.	"Homem Primata" (Primate Man)	Marcelo Fromer, Ciro Pessoa, Nando Reis, Sérgio Britto	3:27
2.	"Polícia (dance remix)" (Police (dance remix))	Tony Bellotto
3.	"Polícia II" (Police II)	Tony Bellotto

=== "Bichos Escrotos" ===
The song "Bichos Escrotos" had originally been written in 1982 and was supposed to be part of the band's debut album, but it was censored by the Brazilian military government, and the band was thus unable to release it until Cabeça Dinossauro. Even after the song was finally released, radio airplay was still prohibited, but the radio stations were receiving so many requests that they decided to play the song anyway and face the fines afterwards, because the price was low enough, compared to the profit, to make the disobedience worth it. For the videoclip, the verse "vão se foder" (go fuck yourselves) was replaced with "vocês vão ver" (you will (all) see).

During a demo recording session in the early 1980s, songwriters Nando Reis, Britto and Antunes took a break as the other Titãs recorded some instrumentals and hung out around a courtyard. Eventually, Reis spotted a cockroach emerging from the drain and that inspired him and the other two to write a song about it. According to him, the song uses the animals cited in the lyrics (cockroaches, rats and fleas), which are considered marginal animals, as metaphors for Titãs themselves, who would keep themselves away from musical and moral patterns and stereotypes.

In one of the earliest performances of the track, Reis would disguise himself and infiltrate the crowd. Eventually, he would interrupt the show and say that wasn't music; he would then simulate an argument with Antunes and would join the band afterwards to resume the song.

==== Anitta version ====
In 2026, Brazilian singer Anitta covered the song for the Prime Video film Corrida dos Bichos. The cover version was highly commented on social media. The new version, produced by Tropkillaz, turned the song into a funk tune.

Amidst the social media reactions, the song was removed from the list of recent releases by Anitta on Spotify, although it was still in her catalog in the streaming service.

Sérgio Britto, then the only co-author of the song still in the band, commented that Anitta's version, "despite being radically different from ours, has a relevant interpretation of what we meant". He said he also saw "contact points with what's done in funk music also because it is a very straightforward language, but it is surprising and anarchic." Paulo Miklos, who sand in the original version and is no longer in the band, said he "loved" the new version, commenting that "Anitta sung with this fine irony and sent the message".

=== "O Quê" ===
"O Quê" was the most demanding track in the album, according to Britto:

The arrangement totally changed and here Liminha had a decisive role: he programmed the electronic drums, he suggested the bass line, he played the guitar and had us perform an endless 'jam' over two days until we reached the final result. That opened a new horizon for us and put us in contact with elements we would explore very much in the next years.

In a 2016 interview, coproducer Pena Schmidt considered that "the mantric perfection of 'O Quê' paved the way for some three subsequent releases. From there, they graduated in pop production and engineering, ready to take on their own career."

== Release and promotion ==
Initially ignored by the radio stations, the album was promoted by a domestic tour which, until December 1986, has already taken the group to around 40 places. At that time, it was scheduled to happen until April 1987. The stage scenery involved the use of animal skin.

== Accolades, legacy and re-release ==
In a 2012 interview, guitarist Tony Bellotto revealed he made a bet with vocalist Branco Mello: he would buy him a bottle of Jack Daniel's in case the album sold over 100,000 copies, since he thought it would be a commercial failure. However, the album sold well, and Tony lost the bet (the album hit the mark in December). Until its first anniversary, the album sold 250,000 copies, with a total of 700,000 sold until 2016. When it reached 100,000 copies, the band received its first gold record and the band promoted a show in São Paulo in order to celebrate the milestone. Just in the period between the album release and the first show of its tour, on 23 August, the album would sell more than the two previous albums combined.

Starting with the album tour, the band found a more consistent and direct identity; the shows dispensed with hits such as "Sonífera Ilha" and included four tracks from Televisão (namely "Massacre", "Televisão", "Dona Nenê" and "Pavimentação") and just one from their debut ("Querem Meu Sangue"). The vocalists started alternating in the microphone instead of staying together by the edge of the stage.

In the Rio de Janeiro leg of the tour, the group couldn't find available venues and had to use the Teatro Carlos Gomes. Two dates were scheduled initially (2 and 3 February), but the success prompted additional dates in an extended season, from 11 to 15 March. On March 14, however, an angry mob stormed into the place while the band was still doing a soundcheck and destroyed some seats, causing the band to be prohibited from continuing with their shows there.

Cabeça Dinossauro is considered one of the most important Brazilian 1980's rock albums, having been released in the same year as other important efforts such as Dois (Legião Urbana), Vivendo e Não Aprendendo (Ira!), Rádio Pirata ao Vivo (RPM) and Selvagem? (Os Paralamas do Sucesso).

In a 2020 interview, Gavin compared the importance of the album for Titãs to that of A Night at the Opera for Queen. In a 2006 article for the Brazilian Rolling Stone, Britto commented:

This album, for sure, if not the best, is one of the best we made. Only comparable to Õ Blésq Blom and Jesus não Tem Dentes no País dos Banguelas. Despite that, I don't dare point any band that seems influenced by it.

In 1997, Bizz magazine elected Cabeça Dinossauro as the best Brazilian pop rock album. In 2007, the Brazilian version of the magazine Rolling Stone elected it as the 19th greatest Brazilian album of all time. In September 2012, it was elected by the audience of Radio Eldorado FM, of Estadao.com e of Caderno C2+Música (both the latter belong to newspaper O Estado de S. Paulo) as the seventh best Brazilian album ever.

In 2012, in order to celebrate the band's 30th anniversary, Cabeça Dinossauro was re-released, fully remastered and with a bonus disc containing the original demos for the songs, plus a previously unreleased track, "Vai pra Rua", an outtake of the album. The band also promoted a tour in which they performed the entire album respecting the original ordering of tracks. One of these performances was recorded and released as Cabeça Dinossauro ao Vivo 2012. Performing the album would help define the sound of the band's then next album, Nheengatu.

In the next year, the remaining members of the band recorded a video for the title song, using images from the movie Vai que Dá Certo. Both the movie and the video feature Brazilian actors and humorists Fábio Porchat, Gregório Duvivier, Bruno Mazzeo, Lúcio Mauro Filho, Danton Mello e Natália Lage.

In 2021, in celebration of its 35th anniversary, the album was re-released for a third time in CD format and containing only its original tracks. In 2022, it was elected as one of the best Brazilian music albums of the last 40 years by a O Globo poll which involved 25 specialists, including Charles Gavin, Nelson Motta, and others.

=== Play and book ===
In 2016, celebrating 30 years of the album, a book with tales inspired by the album's tracks and a play inspired by the album were prepared, titled Cada um por si e Deus contra todos (Everyone for itself and God against all) and Cabeça, respectively.

The play, directed by Felipe Vidal, take eight actors to the stage where they perform the entire album. It features "the sign of urgency and its relation with youth" in two different years: 1986 (when the album was released) and 2016 (when the play was presented). Vidal considers that the sign in 1986 "provoked the urgency of living a newly-acquired liberty, with the end of the dictatorship, today [2016], it fights to guarantee such conquest, in a world scenery troubled by growing conservative forces.

The book was released by publisher Tinta Negra, organized by André Tartarini and includes tales by authors such as Letícia Novaes, Juliana Frank and Renato Lemos, besides an introduction by Bellotto.

== Critical reception ==
Professional ratings
Review scores
Source	Rating
AllMusic	4.5/5 stars

By the time of the album's release, newspaper O Estado de S. Paulo's Alberto Villas stated that the album was "the great surprise of the year. [...] It's a shocking, punk, angry and very curious album. An album of poison-rock, a scream. An album of surprises." He also said he couldn't "find Titãs. Cólera? Olho Seco? Exploited? Bauhaus? What sound is this?"

== Track listing ==
No.	Title	Lyrics	Lead vocals	Length
1.	"Cabeça Dinossauro" (Dinosaur Head)	Arnaldo Antunes, Branco Mello, Paulo Miklos	Branco Mello	2:19
2.	"AA UU"	Marcelo Fromer, Sérgio Britto	Sérgio Britto	3:01
3.	"Igreja" (Church)	Nando Reis	Nando Reis	2:47
4.	"Polícia" (Police)	Tony Bellotto	Sergio Britto	2:07
5.	"Estado Violência" (Violence State)	Charles Gavin	Paulo Miklos	3:07
6.	"A Face do Destruidor" (The Face of the Destroyer)	Arnaldo Antunes, Paulo Miklos	Paulo Miklos	0:38
7.	"Porrada" (Punch)	Arnaldo Antunes, Sérgio Britto	Arnaldo Antunes	2:49
8.	"Tô Cansado" (I'm Tired)	Branco Mello, Arnaldo Antunes	Branco Mello	2:16
9.	"Bichos Escrotos" (Freaky Critters)	Nando Reis, Arnaldo Antunes, Sérgio Britto	Paulo Miklos	3:14
10.	"Família" (Family)	Tony Bellotto, Arnaldo Antunes	Nando Reis	3:32
11.	"Homem Primata" (Primate Man)	Marcelo Fromer, Ciro Pessoa, Nando Reis, Sérgio Britto	Sérgio Britto	3:27
12.	"Dívidas" (Debts)	Branco Mello, Arnaldo Antunes	Branco Mello	3:08
13.	"O Quê" (What)	Arnaldo Antunes	Arnaldo Antunes	5:40

Bonus track on 2012 re-issue

No.	Title	Lyrics	Lead vocals	Length
14.	"Vai pra Rua" (Go to the Streets)	Arnaldo Antunes, Paulo Miklos	Arnaldo Antunes	2:20

=== Covers ===
- Brazilian thrash metal band Sepultura made a cover of "Polícia", present on the B-side of their "Territory" single, the digipak and Brazilian pressings of their 1993 album Chaos A.D., and the compilation Blood-Rooted.
- Biquini Cavadão covered "Estado Violência" in their tribute album 80.
- Pagode group Molejo covered the song "Família", adapting it to a samba rhythm.

== Personnel ==
Titãs

- Arnaldo Antunes — vocals
- Branco Mello — vocals
- Paulo Miklos — bass (on track 3) and vocals
- Nando Reis — bass and vocals
- Sérgio Britto — keyboard and vocals
- Marcelo Fromer — rhythm guitar, lead guitar (on tracks 3 and 10)
- Tony Bellotto — lead guitar, rhythm guitar (on tracks 3 and 10)
- Charles Gavin — drums and percussion

Additional personnel

- Liminha — rhythm guitar (on tracks 10 and 13), percussion (on track 11) and drum machine (Oberheim DMX) (on track 12)
- Repolho — castanets (on track 11)
