= André Jung (musician) =

Brazilian drummer (born 1961)

- Born: André Jungmann Pinto; May 12, 1961 (age 65); Recife, Pernambuco, Brazil
- Genre: Rock
- Occupation: Musician
- Instrument: Drums
- Years active: 1982–present

André Jung (born May 12, 1961) is a Brazilian drummer, best known for his performances in the band Ira!. He has also been a member of Titãs, although he has released only one album (Titãs) with them. The drummer that he replaced in Ira! (Charles Gavin) went to play with Titãs until 2010. André studied journalism at the Communication and Arts School (ECA) of the University of São Paulo and writes columns for sites and newspapers.

Currently has a new band named Urban ToTem, alongside former acoustic tour members of IRA! such as Michelle Abu and Jonas Moncaio.

== Discography ==
=== With Titãs ===
- Titãs (1984)

=== With Urban ToTem ===
- Urban ToTem (2008)
