= Molejo =

Brazilian pagode band

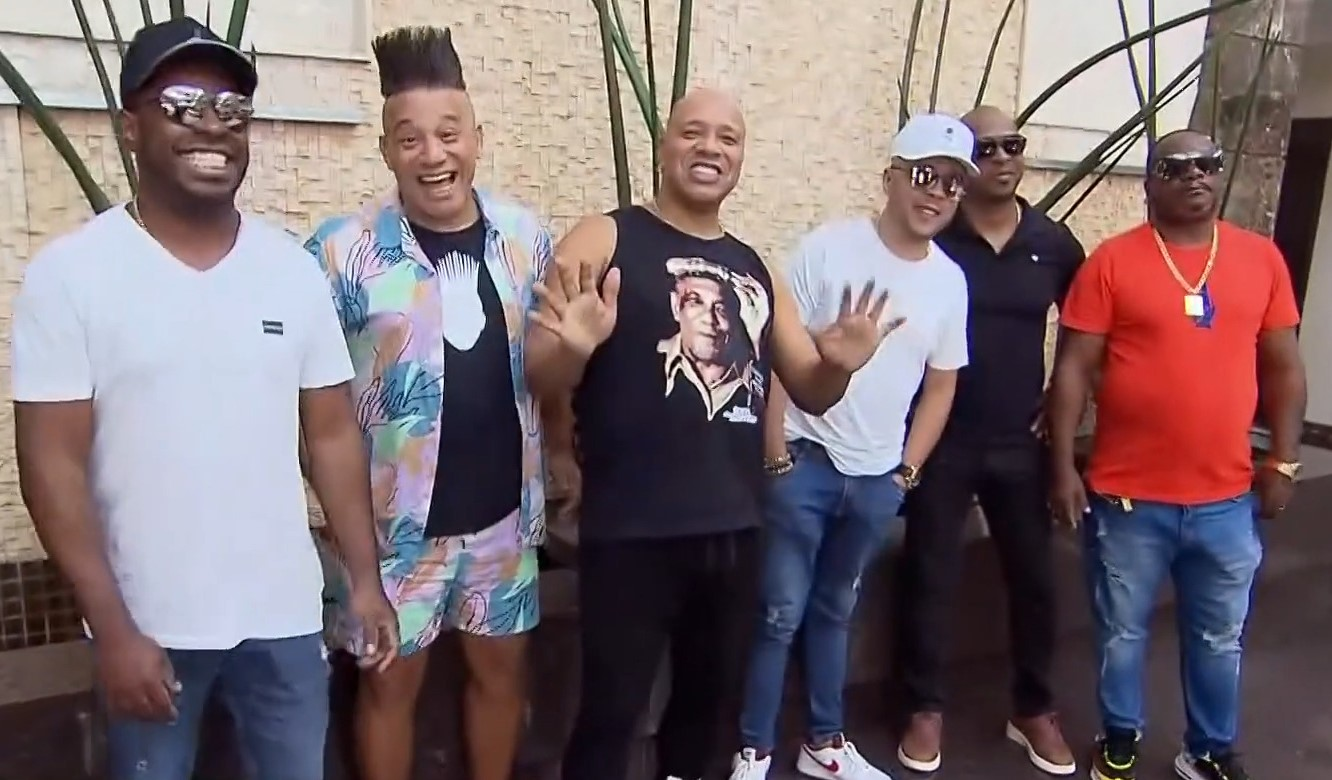
- Molejo in 2022

Background information
- Origin: Rio de Janeiro, RJ, Brazil
- Genres: Pagode, samba
- Years active: 1993–present
- Members: Marquinhos Pato; Robson Calazans; Lúcio Nascimento; Jimmy Batera
- Past members: Anderson Leonardo; Wander Pires; Vandinho; Andrezinho; Claumirzinho
- Website: http://www.molejo.com.br/

Molejo is a pagode musical group formed in Rio de Janeiro in 1993 by Anderson Leonardo, Andrezinho, Wander Pires, Claumirzinho, Lúcio Nascimento, and Vadinho.

The group had great success in the 90s with the songs "Caçamba", "Brincadeira de Criança", "Dança da Vassoura", "Samba Rock do Molejão", "Paparico", "Cilada", Clínica Geral, "Ah Moleque", "Samba Diferente", "Pensamento Verde", "Assim Oh", etc.

On 26 April 2024, Anderson Leonardo died from cancer at the age of 51. He had been diagnosed in 2022.

== Discography ==
=== Albums ===
- Grupo Molejo (1993)
- Grupo Molejo - Volume 2 (1995)
- Não Quero Saber de Ti Ti Ti (1996)
- Brincadeira de Criança (1997)
- Família (1998)
- Polivalência (2000)
- Prepara o Corpo (2001)
- Alô Comunidade Ao Vivo (2003)
- Todo Mundo Gosta (2008)
- Voltei!! (2010)
- 25 Anos - #obaileesemparar (Ao Vivo) (2014)
- Molejo Club (2016)
