= AA UU =

Single by Titãs

from the album Cabeça Dinossauro
- Released: 1986
- Genre: Post-punk
- Length: 3:01
- Label: WEA
- Songwriter(s): Marcelo Fromer, Sérgio Britto
- Producer(s): Liminha, Vitor Farias and Pena Schmidt

Titãs singles chronology
"Insensível" (1985)	"AA UU" (1986)	"Polícia"

Music video
- "AA UU" on YouTube

"AA UU" is the fourth single by Titãs, released in 1986. Most of this song consists simply of Sérgio Britto screaming "AA", while the other vocalists reply with "UU". The band Símios made a cover of this song. The song was featured on the Rede Globo telenovela Hipertensão and on the soundtrack for the 2008 film Meu Nome Não É Johnny.

A song they already played in shows before working on the album, it was the first track to be recorded for Cabeça Dinossauro. The track received some airplay, but not without resistance. It only became a hit after its video was broadcast on Rede Globo's Fantástico. It expresses their frustration in not being able to communicate properly.
