= Titãs (album) =

Studio album by Titãs
- Released: 1984
- Recorded: 1984, at the Áudio Patrulha
- Genres: Post-punk, new wave, reggae fusion
- Length: 34:44
- Label: WEA
- Producer: Pena Schmidt

Titãs chronology
Titãs (1984)	Televisão (1985)

Singles from Titãs
- 1. "Sonífera Ilha" Released: 1984

Titãs is the debut album of Brazilian rock band Titãs. It is the only album to feature André Jung on drums. The album also features Pena Schmidt's production and some contributions from vocalist Ciro Pessoa, who founded the band only to quit before the album was released. Though the album sold poorly (less than 50,000 copies by the time of its release), it generated some hit singles and secured some performances at popular TV shows such as the ones presented by Chacrinha and Hebe Camargo. By August 1997, its total sales were at 109,000.

In its cover, there is a picture of the members in which they appear to be slightly pending to their right, but in reality they were all standing straight. The photograph was taken in a ramp-like surface and later adjusted in the cover so that all members were aligned.

Unlike what was common practice at that time, no single was released before the album since the band - composed of nine members up until shortly before the album recording - didn't want to be represented by a single song.

== Song information ==
Ron Dunbar's classic AOR hit "Patches" was reworked and renamed "Marvin", with a live version featuring on Titãs' 1997 live album Acústico MTV and becoming a hit single. Jimmy Cliff's "The Harder They Come" was also reworked and named "Querem Meu Sangue". It was also performed live, with Cliff himself as a guest, in Acústico MTV.

A song called "Charles Chacal" (written by Britto and named after Venezuelan terrorist Carlos the Jackal) was composed during the recording sections, but never made it to the album due to then-rampant government censorship by the Brazilian military government. It was only recorded once, when the band performed it live at a TV Cultura show called "Fábrica do Som". In 2013, the song was covered by Brazilian band Garotas Suecas, with the guest performance of Paulo Miklos, who commented:

As a song of ours called "Bichos Escrotos" was not approved by the censorship, we thought "Charles Chacal" would not be allowed either, so we didn't even send it and it ended up kinda forgotten.

== Track listing ==
No.	Title	Lyrics	Lead vocals	Length
1.	"Sonífera Ilha" (Sleepy Island)	Branco Mello, Marcelo Fromer, Tony Bellotto, Ciro Pessoa, Carlos Barmack	Paulo Miklos	2:56
2.	"Marvin (Patches)"	Ron Dunbar, General Johnson, Nando Reis, Sérgio Britto	Reis	4:15
3.	"Babi Índio"	Mello, Pessoa	Mello	3:42
4.	"Go Back"	Britto, Torquato Neto	Britto	3:41
5.	"Pule" (Jump)	Arnaldo Antunes, Miklos	Miklos, Mello, Reis	2:56
6.	"Querem Meu Sangue" (They Want My Blood)	Reis, Jimmy Cliff	Reis	3:11
7.	"Mulher Robô" (Robot Woman)	Bellotto	Miklos	2:25
8.	"Demais" (Could mean both "too much" and "wonderful")	Antunes	Antunes, Reis	2:51
9.	"Toda Cor" (Every Color)	Fromer, Pessoa, Barmack	Mello	3:24
10.	"Balada para John e Yoko"	Britto, Lennon–McCartney	Britto	2:38
11.	"Seu Interesse" (Your Interest)	Antunes, Miklos	Antunes	3:11

== Personnel ==
- Nando Reis - Lead vocals on tracks 2 and 6, co-lead vocals on tracks 5 and 8, backing vocals on tracks 3 and 8–11, bass on tracks 1, 4, 5 and 7
- Paulo Miklos - Bass, lead vocals on tracks 1 and 7, co-lead vocals on tracks 5 and 11, keyboards on track 4
- André Jung - Drums and percussion
- Arnaldo Antunes - Lead vocals on track 11, co-lead vocals on track 8, backing vocals on tracks 1–7, 9 and 10
- Branco Mello - Lead vocals on tracks 3 and 9, co-lead vocals on track 5, backing vocals on tracks 1, 2, 4, 6–8, 10 and 11
- Tony Bellotto - Lead and rhythm guitar, backing vocals
- Sérgio Britto - Keyboards, lead vocals on tracks 4 and 10
- Marcelo Fromer - Rhythm and lead guitar

Additional personnel

- Alberto Marcicano - Zither on track 8
- Eduardo Souto Neto - Arrangement and conducting of metals on tracks 6 and 10
- George Freire - Soprano Saxophone on track 2
- Gil and Nono - Trumpet
- Proveta and Baldo - Saxophone
- Ivan - Trombone
