= Polícia (song) =

Single by Titãs

from the album Cabeça Dinossauro
- Released: 1986
- Genre: Punk rock
- Length: 2:07
- Label: WEA
- Composer: Tony Bellotto
- Lyricist: Tony Bellotto
- Producers: Liminha; Vitor Farias; Pena Schmidt

Titãs singles chronology
"Aa Uu" (1986)	"Polícia" (1986)	"Homem Primata" (1987)

"Polícia" is the fifth single by Titãs, from the album Cabeça Dinossauro, released in 1986. The song, written just after Tony Bellotto and Arnaldo Antunes were arrested for heroin traffic, criticizes the police. According to Branco Mello, vocalist of the band, the album Cabeça Dinossauro had "much of that disappointment of being arrested and to know you are not a criminal".

Sérgio Britto recorded the first take of his lead vocals while overhearing a conversation between producer Liminha and Evandro Mesquita about spearfishing, which made him angry. He wanted to record a second performance, but his bandmates convinced him the first attempt was fine. He only had three minutes to record his part.

Originally, nobody wanted to take on lead vocals for the song, which Bellotto wrote having Paulo Miklos in mind. The members didn't even think "Polícia" had any potential at all. Since Britto only sang two other songs from the album ("AA UU" and "Homem Primata"), he ended up singing "Polícia", as well.

By the time of the album's release, Bellotto said it would be naïve to think a country doesn't need the police to fight criminals and murderers, but he believed he didn't need the police in his life when he was arrested for heroin possession.

The song was covered by Brazilian band Sepultura. It was included on their albums Blood-Rooted (1997), Under a Pale Grey Sky (2002), the covered song was featured exclusively on the soundtrack version of Tales from the Crypt presents: Demon Knight (1995) and also on the Brazilian edition of Chaos A.D.. Originally, it was released as a B-side on the "Territory" single, released by Roadrunner Records.

"Polícia" was featured in the soundtrack of Elite Squad. A version of the song was used as the opening theme for a Rede Globo TV series called Força-Tarefa.
