= Charles Gavin =

Brazilian drummer (born 1960)

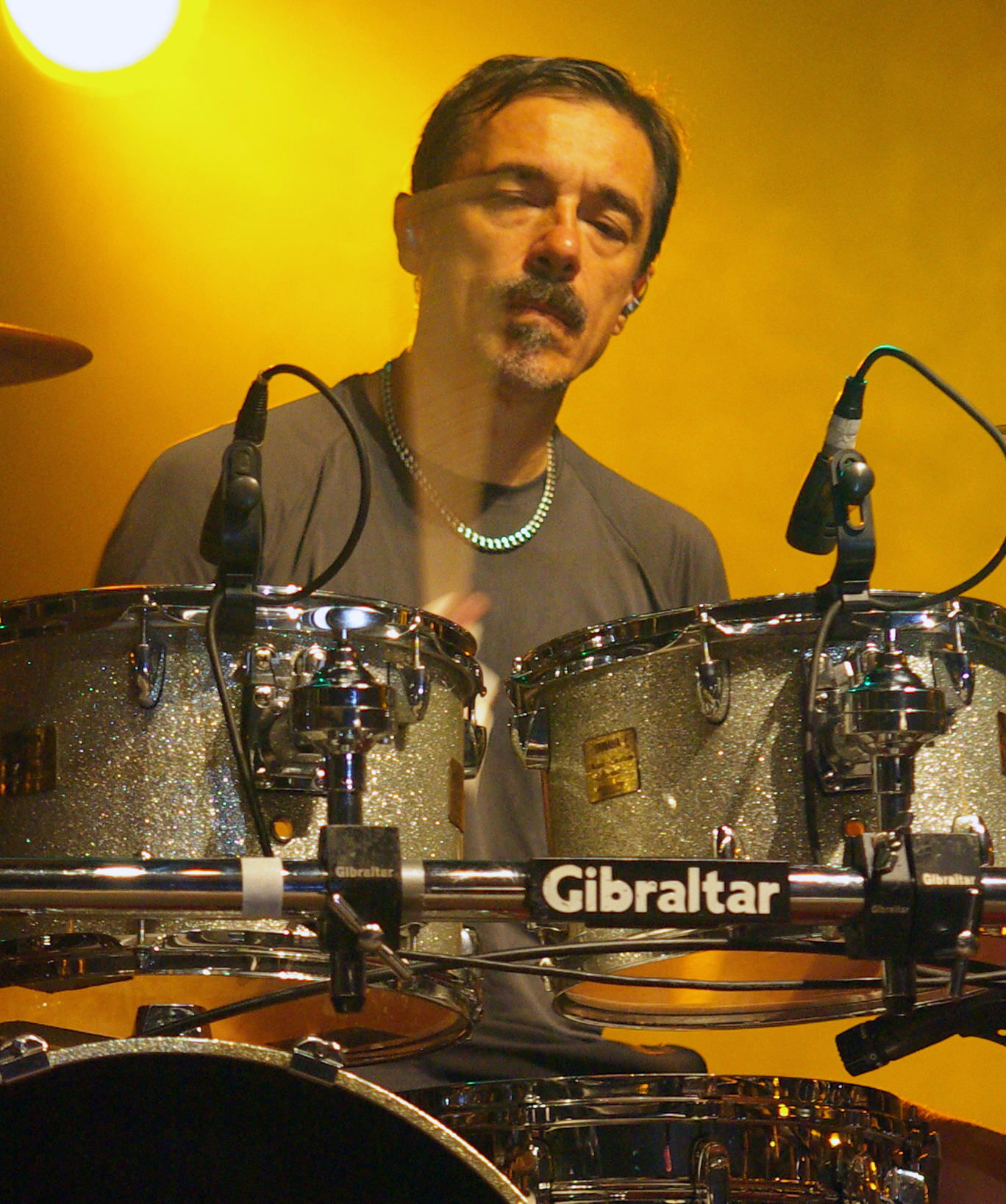
- Gavin with Titãs in 2009

Background information
- Born: Charles de Souza Gavin; 9 July 1960 (age 66); São Paulo, Brazil
- Genres: Rock
- Occupations: Musician, composer, songwriter, producer
- Instrument: Drums
- Years active: 1982–present

Charles de Souza Gavin (born 9 July 1960) is a Brazilian drummer and music producer, perhaps best known for his 25-year tenure with rock band Titãs. Before Titãs, he had brief stints at Ira! and RPM.

== Early life and first works ==
At age 8, his friends invited him to participate on 7 September (Brazil's Independence Day) festival. The problem was the absence of decent percussion instruments. So, the school decided to improvise these with kitchen utensils. But there was still an instrument remaining, which would be quite difficult for a not so skillful drummer to play. Gavin, who was already used to beat the table at school, was chosen for the job. The band, commanded by Gavin, won the originality prize.

In 1975, at the year of 15, living in Jabaquara, Gavin joined ten neighbors, and during the weeks that preceded the Carnaval, they promoted noisy beats around the streets. However, his ears were focused on the discs of Led Zeppelin, Black Sabbath and Emerson, Lake & Palmer. Once the drumming life was chosen, he built himself his first own drum kit, using pieces of his father's Opala, his sofa, and two ash trays.

In 1979, when he was 19, Gavin convinced his father to buy his first true drum kit, a white Pinguim. The condition to keep the instrument was not to quit college, though. In 1982, Gavin entered administration at the Ponthifical Catholic University of São Paulo, while working at Panasonic, operating huge computers.

During his studies at PUC, he entered the band Zero Hora, and later the bands Santa Gang, Zona Franca and Os Jetsons, the latter together with Branco Mello and Ciro Pessoa, members of Titãs, the band he would join in 1985. Also with Ciro, he performed with Cabine C, but with Ira! he made more shows, and caught Titãs's attention.

Gavin cites Stewart Copeland, Neil Peart, Ginger Baker and John Bonham as some of his influences.

== Career with Titãs ==
On 25 December 1984, when he had already switched Ira! for RPM (he made it to release a two-track single with the group but left before the release of their first album), he was invited to join Titãs by vocalist Mello and keyboardist/vocalist Sérgio Britto. André Jung, who left Titãs, would replace Gavin at Ira!. Undecided about going to Titãs or staying with RPM, he sought advice from his colleague Edgard Scandurra, who recommended going to Titãs, where he could possibly have a bigger voice; although RPM was only a quartet, everything was much controlled by Paulo Ricardo and Luiz Schiavon. Gavin left his triple life and dedicated himself only to music. In 1985, he made his debut with the band and entered the studio to record their second album, Televisão. He left Titãs in 2010.

== Other projects ==
One of his main activities is to collect rare LPs. Gavin transformed this hobby in a second activity, Titãs being the first one. He re-released discs from artists like Tom Zé, Lady Zu and Novos Baianos, beyond organizing compilations for labels. Since the end of the 1980s, he has been also producing. His first production work was the album "Vítimas do Sistema", from the Brazilian band Detrito Federal, in 1988.

In 2007, he released his first book, called 300 Discos Importantes da Música Brasileira (300 Important Albums of the Brazilian Music).

== Personal life ==
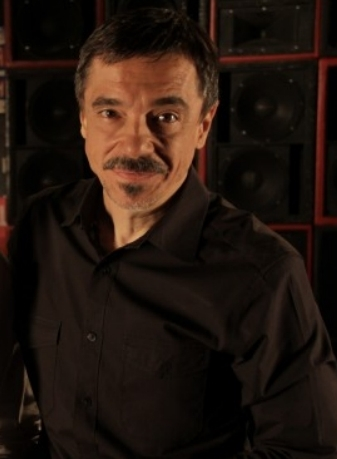
Gavin in 2015

Married to the dancer Mariana Roquette-Pinto (who was once kidnapped in Rio de Janeiro and, after four days, rescued by the local police, in a period both were still only dating each other), Gavin had two daughters with her: Dora, born in 2003, and Sofia, born in September 2005.

== Discography ==
=== With Titãs ===
- Titãs (1984)
- Televisão (1985)
- Cabeça Dinossauro (1986)
- Jesus não Tem Dentes no País dos Banguelas (1987)
- Õ Blésq Blom (1989)
- Tudo Ao Mesmo Tempo Agora (1991)
- Titanomaquia (1993)
- Domingo (1995)
- Volume Dois (1998)
- As Dez Mais (1999)
- A Melhor Banda de Todos os Tempos da Última Semana (2001)
- Como Estão Vocês? (2003)
- Sacos Plásticos (2009)

=== With Ira! ===
- Ira! (1984)

=== With RPM ===
- RPM (1984)

=== As a producer ===
- Vítimas do Milagre (1987) – Detrito Federal
- Vange (1991) – Vange Leonel
- Moleque de Rua (1993) – Moleque de Rua
- Samba Esquema Noise (1995) – Mundo Livre S/A
- Ronaldo e os Impedidos (1996) – Ronaldo e os Impedidos
- Heart & Soul (1996) – Blues Solon Fishbone y Los Cobras

=== Guest appearances as a drummer ===
Artist	Album	Song
Dulce Quintal	Délica (1986)	"Diferentes"
Marina Lima	Marina Lima (1991)	"Não estou bem certa"
Ronaldo e os Impedidos	Ronaldo e os Impedidos (1996)	"Rockixe"
Made in Brazil	Sexo, Blues e Rock 'n' Roll (1998)	"Remédio pra Dormir"
Sepultura	SepulQuarta (2021)	"Ratamahatta"

=== Som Livre Masters series ===
Record label Som Livre commissioned Gavin to select 25 rare albums for inclusion in their Som Livre Masters Series of CD reissues.

The albums:

1. Sambas – Don Junior, Walter Wanderley, Milton Banana
2. Bossa nova, nova bossa – Manfredo Fest
3. Bossa Jazz Trio – Bossa Jazz Trio
4. Sansa Trio – Sansa Trio
5. Os Brazões – Os Brazões
6. Em Som Maior – Sambrasa Trio
7. Sambossa 5
8. Quarteto Bossamba – Walter Wanderley
9. Reencontro com Sambalanço Trio – Sambalanço Trio
10. Som 3 – Cesar Camargo Mariano
11. Os Sambistas – Paulinho da Viola
12. Decisão – Zimbo Trio
13. Brazilian Octopus – Hermeto Pascoal
14. Com Dizia O Poeta – Vinicius de Moraes, Marília Medalha, Toquinho
15. E deixa o relógio andar – Osmar Milito
16. Rosinha de Valença – Rosinha de Valença
17. Molhado de Suor – Alceu Valença
18. Vila Sésamo
19. Vamos pro Mundo – Novos Baianos
20. Gerson Conrad e Zezé Motta
21. Sítio do Picapau Amarelo
22. Tim Maia – Tim Maia
23. Vontade De Rever Você – Marcos Valle
24. Nave Maria – Tom Zé
25. Línguas de Fogo – Sidney Miller
