= Sérgio Britto =

Brazilian musician

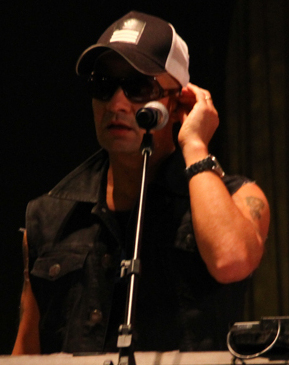
- Britto in 2013

Background information
- Born: Sérgio de Britto Álvares Affonso; September 18, 1959 (age 66); Rio de Janeiro, Brazil
- Genres: Rock
- Occupation: Musician
- Instruments: Vocals; keyboards; bass; guitar
- Years active: 1981–present
- Member of: Titãs

Sérgio de Britto Álvares Affonso (Portuguese pronunciation: [ˈsɛʁʒju ˈbɾitu]; born September 18, 1959), known as Sérgio Britto, is a Brazilian musician. He is a member of the rock band Titãs, for which he contributes lead vocals, keyboards and, more recently, bass guitar. He has also released three solo albums.

== Biography ==
=== Childhood ===
Sérgio Britto is the only carioca of the group, but left Rio de Janeiro when he was a baby. He lived with his siblings Rui and Gláucia in Brasília when in 1964 the military took over Brazil. Their father, the federal deputy Almino Afonso, head of PTB at the Chamber of Deputies and enemy of the dictatorship had to leave the country in order not to be arrested. One year later, when Sergio's younger brother Fábio was born, they left the country. During his nine years of exile in Chile, he was alphabetized in Castellano. In Chile, Britto and his siblings would play with the children of Paulo Freire, a fellow exile, in the backyard of the semi-detached house they shared in Las Condes.

He grew up listening to Beethoven, Chopin, and other classical music composers, which his father listened to frequently. Until he turned 13, he wished to be a painter. He discovered The Beatles' Help! album, and from there on he would be strongly interested in music. When he was 14, he was back to Brazil and began taking piano lessons. At that time, he listened to Yes, Emerson, Lake & Palmer, The Who, Led Zeppelin, The Beach Boys and much MPB. Meanwhile, he would try to play his sister's guitar.

In São Paulo, he studied at Colégio Equipe. While the others Titãs members took part of festivals and shows, he would compose alone at home or read the texts of Torquato Neto. Those texts helped Britto when composing songs like "Go Back", a hit that would appear in Titãs' debut album. Simultaneously, he would compose the song "Os Olhos do Sol", which was recorded only in 2000, when Britto released his first solo album. At Equipe, he met Arnaldo Antunes and they started to co-write songs. When Titãs unofficially met, in 1981, Britto made his debut in a band.

He once started studying Philosophy at University of São Paulo (USP), but left the course before its end to focus on the music.

=== Career with and without Titãs ===
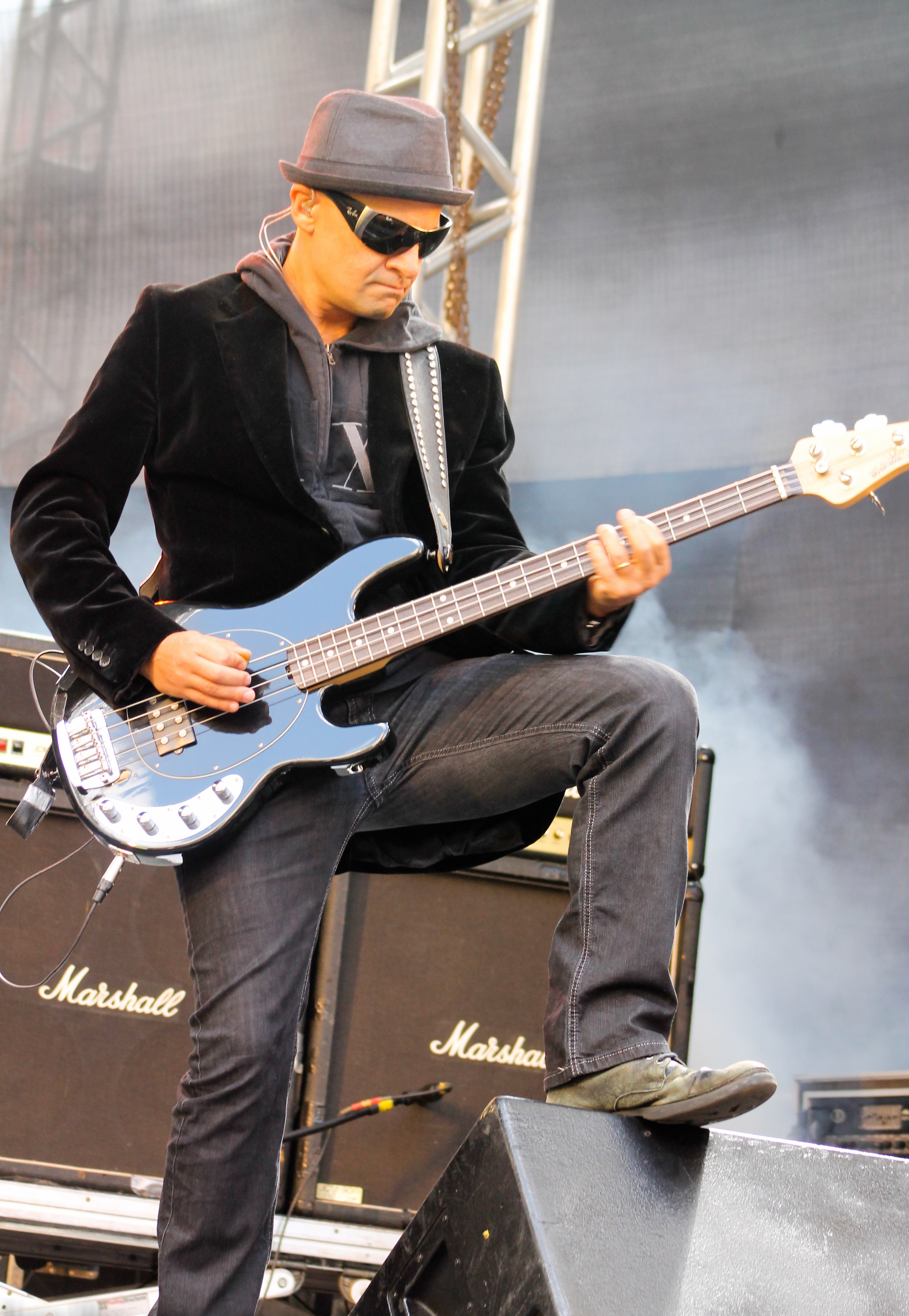
Since 2009, Britto plays the bass in every Titãs song in which Branco Mello (the band's current bassist) sings.

Britto has co-composed the majority of Titãs' songs, including hits like "Marvin", "Homem Primata", "Comida", "Miséria" and "Epitáfio".

In 1994, Britto formed the band Kleiderman, with the drummer Roberta Parisi and Titãs member Branco Mello. The group released only one album, Con el Mundo a Mis Pies (With the World at my Feet). In 2001, Britto showed his solo works with the album A Minha Cara (My Face), reuniting songs composed by him, with the help of Marcelo Fromer and Arnaldo Antunes.

Five years later, he released another solo CD, called Eu Sou 300 (I am 300).

In 2009, Titãs released Sacos Plásticos, the first album in which Britto played the bass guitar. After original bassist Nando Reis left the group, Titãs hired Lee Marcucci as a session musician from 2002 to 2009. Since then, Britto and Mello have been sharing bass duties, with Britto taking over the bass only on the songs with vocals by Mello.

In 2019, singer Érika Martins released the song "A Verdade Liberta", written by Britto. On 13 July 2022, World Rock Day, the band CPM 22 released the song "Tudo Vale a Pena?" (Is Everything Worth It?), co-composed and co-written by Britto.

In January 2025, he released the compilation The Best of Sérgio Britto, with 13 picks from his five solo albums. On 8 May of the same year, he released his sixth solo album, Mango Dragon Fruit, focusing on bossa nova and featuring Ed Motta, Bebel Gilberto, Fernanda Takai, Supla and João Suplicy.

=== Personal life ===
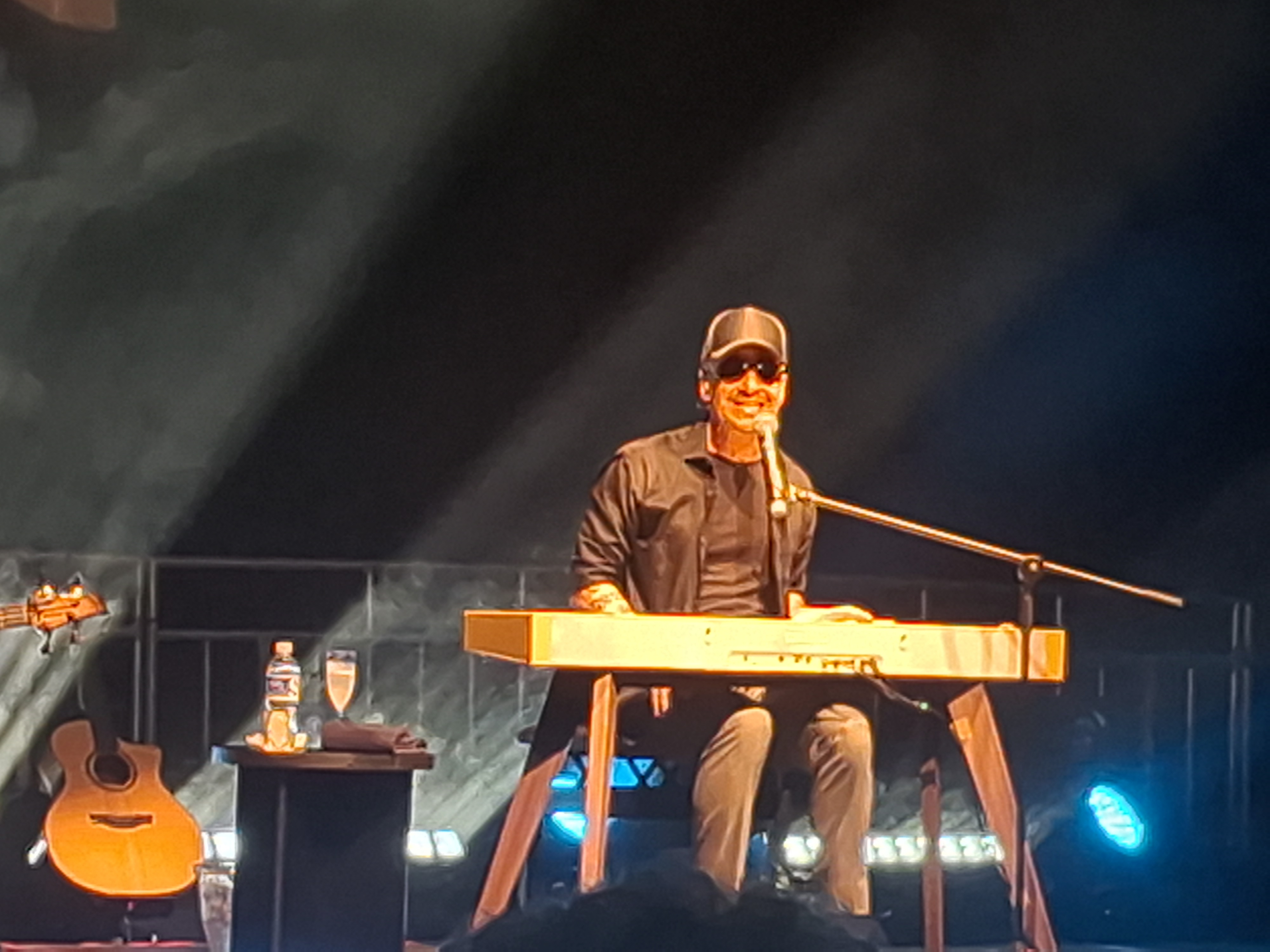
Sérgio Britto show at SESC Campinas for the launch of the album “Mango Dragon Fruit” in 2025.

Britto lives in São Paulo, is married to Raquel Garrido and is the father of José, born in 1999 and Raquel. He composed one tribute song for each of them in his album Eu Sou 300: "Raquel (DDD)" and "José". In 2007, his daughter Julia was born.

== Discography ==
=== Solo albums ===
- 2000 - A Minha Cara ("My Face")
- 2006 - Eu Sou 300 ("I Am 300")
- 2010 - SP55
- 2013 - Purabossanova ("Purebossanova")
- 2020 - Epifania ("Epiphany")
- 2025 - The Best of Sérgio Britto (compilation)
- 2025 - Mango Dragon Fruit

=== With Kleiderman ===
- Con el mundo a mis pies

=== Guest appearances ===
Artist	Album	Song(s)	Instrument(s)
Raimundos	Raimundos (1993)	"Bê a Bá", "Bicharada" and "Carro Forte"	Backing vocals
Theo Werneck	Terceiro Mundo (1993)	"Falou Presidente"	Guitar, Vocals, Bass, Tambourine, 12 String Acoustic Guitar
Marina Lima	Pierrot do Brasil (1998)	"Leva (Esse samba, esse amor)"	Lead vocals

== Bibliography ==
- Marcelo, Carlos (2012). Renato Russo: o Filho da Revolução (in Brazilian Portuguese). Rio de Janeiro: Agir. ISBN 978-85-22013-77-7.
