= Paulo Miklos =

Brazilian singer-songwriter and multi-instrumentalist

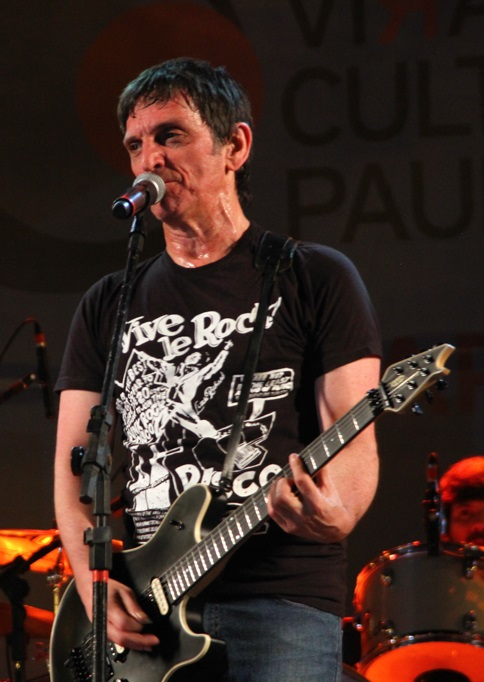
- Paulo Miklos at the 2013 Virada Cultural Paulista in Barretos, São Paulo, Brazil.

Background information
- Born: Paulo Roberto de Souza Miklos; January 21, 1959 (age 67); São Paulo, SP, Brazil
- Genres: Rock, alternative rock, post-punk, new wave, punk rock, Brazilian rock
- Occupations: Musician, singer, songwriter, actor
- Instruments: Vocals; guitar; bass; saxophone; harmonica; flute; keyboards; mandolin; banjo
- Years active: 1979–present

Paulo Roberto de Souza Miklos (known as Paulo Miklos Portuguese pronunciation: [ˈpawlu ˈmiklus], born on January 21, 1959) is a Brazilian multi-instrumentalist, musician and actor. He is best known for his tenure with the band Titãs, in which he was a vocalist, guitarist and occasional saxophonist, keyboardist and harmonica player from its inception in 1982 until 2016, when he left it to focus on personal projects.

As an actor, he has appeared in a few films and television series. His acting career started with a main role in the movie O Invasor.

== Childhood ==
During his childhood, he learned to play the piano, the sax and the transverse flute. When he turned 12, he was given his first acoustic guitar, and decided to become a musician. He made it to play almost every instrument he could put his hands on, being influenced by The Beatles, Led Zeppelin, Deep Purple and the Tropicália movement.

== Early works ==
At high school, he started to create his own songs with his classmate Arnaldo Antunes. This partnership would later become Titãs. His professional debut happened on a TV Tupi music festival, in 1979, when he made an arrangement for a reggae song by Chico Evangelista. From small solo shows at bars to performances with bands like Bom Quixote, Sossega Leão and Banda Performática, he established his name in the local musical scene. Some well-known names in São Paulo, like Arrigo Barnabé, asked him to play with them.

After concluding high school at the Equipe school, he entered Philosophy at Pontifícia Universidade Católica de São Paulo and Psychology at Mogi Mirim. But after a few classes, he quit. So he entered the Music course of Escola de Comunicações e Artes (ECA) (Art and Communication School) of University of São Paulo, but as the course was strongly focused on classical music, he quit it too.

== Titãs and rise to fame ==
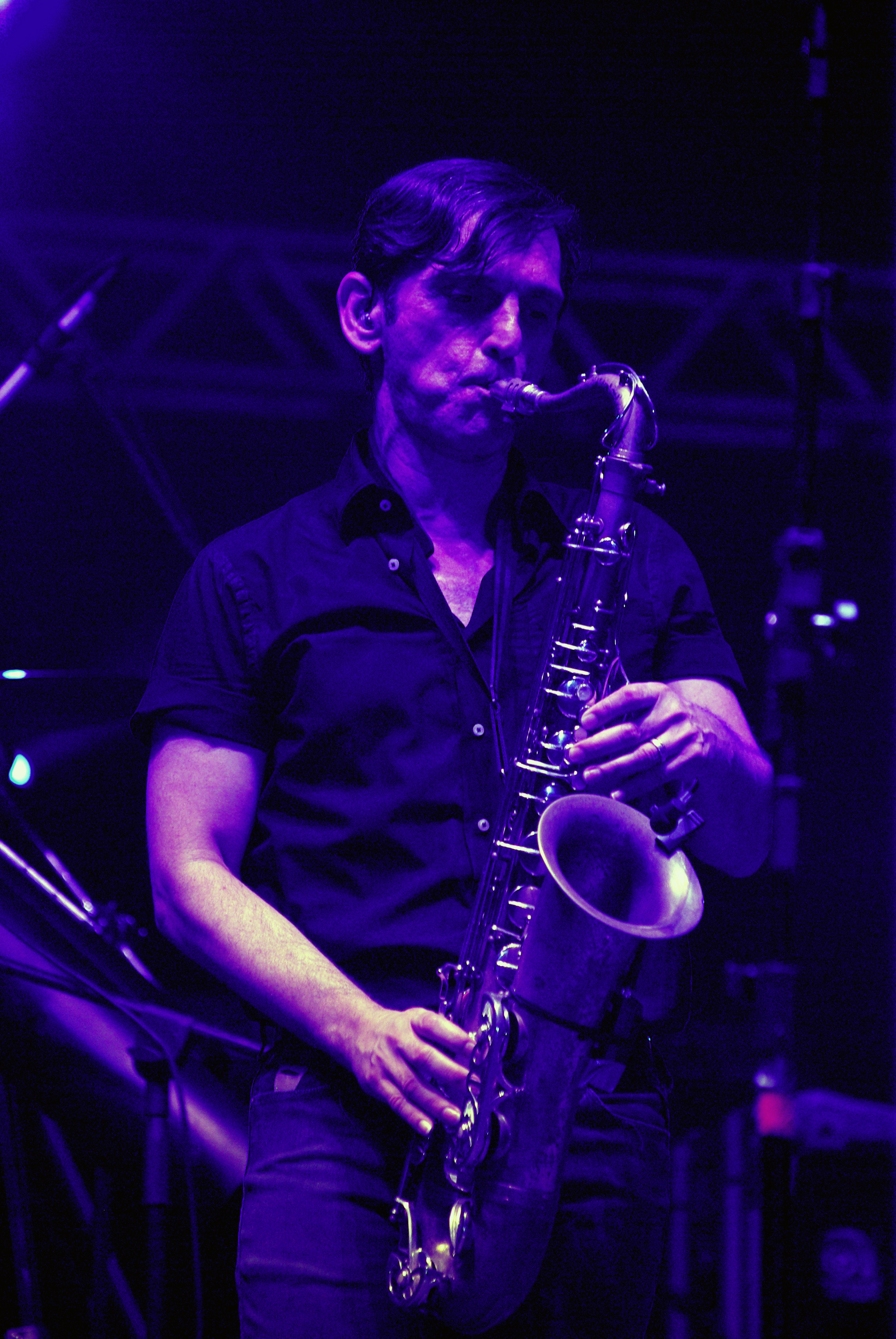
Paulo Miklos occasionally plays the saxophone. Here, he is seen performing live in 2009 during a Titãs & Os Paralamas do Sucesso show in Recife, Pernambuco, Brazil.

In 1981, he, Arnaldo and some other friends founded Titãs, which made Paulo raise to fame. Since its beginning, Paulo has been playing different instruments: sax, bass, guitar, keyboards, harmonica, etc.

In 1994, he released his self-titled first solo album, filled with songs written and composed by him. Until August 1997, it had already sold 7,800 copies. In 2001, he released the second one, called Vou Ser Feliz E Já Volto (I'm going to be happy, I'll be right back), produced by Dudu Marote.

In 2002, he made his debut at the cinema, playing the role of the murder Anísio, in the movie O Invasor, directed by Beto Brant. He earned five awards for the role: Surprise actor of the year and best original score at the Festival de Cinema de Brasília (Brasília Cinema Festival) and best supporting actor at the Cinema Brazil Grand Prize and Miami Brazilian Film Festival, best music at the Miami Brazilian Film Festival.

In 2014, he and Pato Fu vocalist Fernanda Takai performed the song "Mostra tua força Brasil" (Show Your Strength, Brazil), composed by Jair Oliveira and directed by Simoninha; it was a campaign by Itaú Unibanco for the 2014 FIFA World Cup in Brazil. This was not his only work linked to the World Cup: On June 10, he, along with journalist Eduardo Bueno; actress Maitê Proença, and writer Xico Sá debuted the TV show Extra Ordinários ("Extra Ordinary"), a SporTV humorous program in which the four, along with some guest stars, comment the World Cup and related themes.

== Post-Titãs works ==
In 2016, he announced he would leave the band to focus on his personal projects on music and acting. By then he had already commenced working on his third studio album, still untitled, which is in production stages. By that time, he promised to follow new ways as a composer, interpreter and actor.

In June 2017, he announced his album would be produced by Pupillo (Nação Zumbi), musically directed by journalist and researcher Marcus Preto and would feature many collaborations, including with Emicida, Dadi Carvalho, Erasmo Carlos in "País Elétrico", Guilherme Arantes in "Estou Pronto" and Russo Passapusso (BaianaSystem) in "Vigia". His former Titãs colleagues Arnaldo Antunes and Nando Reis were also invited, but their participations are yet to be confirmed.

In July 2017, the album title (A Gente Mora no Agora) and release date (August 2017) were announced, with the release show taking place on August 17 in São Paulo. The first single, "A Lei Desse Troço", was also released on July 7. It's a collaboration with Emicida with arrangements by Letieres Leite. Still in July, on the 28th, he released the song "Vou te Encontrar", written by Nando Reis, another former Titãs member.

== Personal life ==
Paulo Miklos lives in São Paulo with his daughter Manoela. His wife was Rachel Salém, who died on July 23, 2013, of lung cancer.

== Discography ==
=== Solo works ===
- Paulo Miklos – 1994
- Vou Ser Feliz e Já Volto – 2001
- A Gente Mora no Agora – 2017

=== Other albums ===
- Mundo Pop – 2004
- Mundo Rock – 2004
- O Invasor – 2001
- Bang Bang Nacional, with the song "Os Dois No Ar" – 2006

=== Guest appearances ===
Artist	Album	Song(s)	Instrument(s)
Raimundos	Raimundos (1993)	"Bê a Bá", "Bicharada" and "Carro Forte"	Backing vocals
Various artists	Rei (1995)	"Sua Estupidez"	Lead vocals
Os Paralamas do Sucesso	Uns Dias Ao Vivo (2004)	"O Beco"	Lead vocals
Various artists	Bandas Gaúchas - Acústico MTV (2005)	"Dia Perfeito"	Lead vocals with Cachorro Grande
The Originals	Pra todo mundo ouvir (2005)	"Era um garoto que como eu amava os Beatles ..", "Festa de Arromba" e " Elas por Elas"	Lead vocals
Various artists	Vou tirar você desse lugar (2005)	"Vou tirar você desse lugar"	Lead vocals
Túlio Dek	O que se leva da vida é a vida que se leva (2008)	"O que se leva da vida é a vida que se leva"	Lead vocals
Nando Reis	Jardim-Pomar (2016)	"Azul de Presunto"	Backing vocals

== Filmography ==
=== Film ===
Year	Film	Role	Notes
2002	O Invasor	Anísio	Five awards earned
2005	Boleiros 2: Vencedores e vencidos	Lauro	
2008	Estômago	Etecétera	
2008	É Proibido Fumar	Max	
2023	Saudosa Maloca	Adoniran Barbosa	

=== Television ===
Year	Program	Role
2002	Os Normais	Pedroca
2004	Celebridade	Himself
2005	Mandrake	Zenon
2006	Bang Bang	Kid Cadillac
2008	Xuxa e as Noviças	Kléber
2008	Casos e Acasos	Chief of Security of the Airport
2009	Força-Tarefa (Chapter 9: "Apartamento 124" ("Apartment 124")	Leandro
2009	Aline	Jorge
2010	Na Forma da Lei	Zé Gorila
2012	Acampamento de Férias	Zulmiro
2012	Saturday Night Live	Episode 13
2012	Sessão de Terapia	Michel Vidal (Nina's father, episode 43)
2016	The X Factor (Brazil)	Member of the jury
2017	Sob Pressão	Valter (Episode 2)
2018	Pacto de Sangue (previously known as A Lei)	Mauro Cáceres
2018	O Sétimo Guardião	Jurandir
2018	Assédio	Artur Castelo
2021	Manhãs de Setembro	Décio
