= Tony Bellotto =

Brazilian guitarist and writer

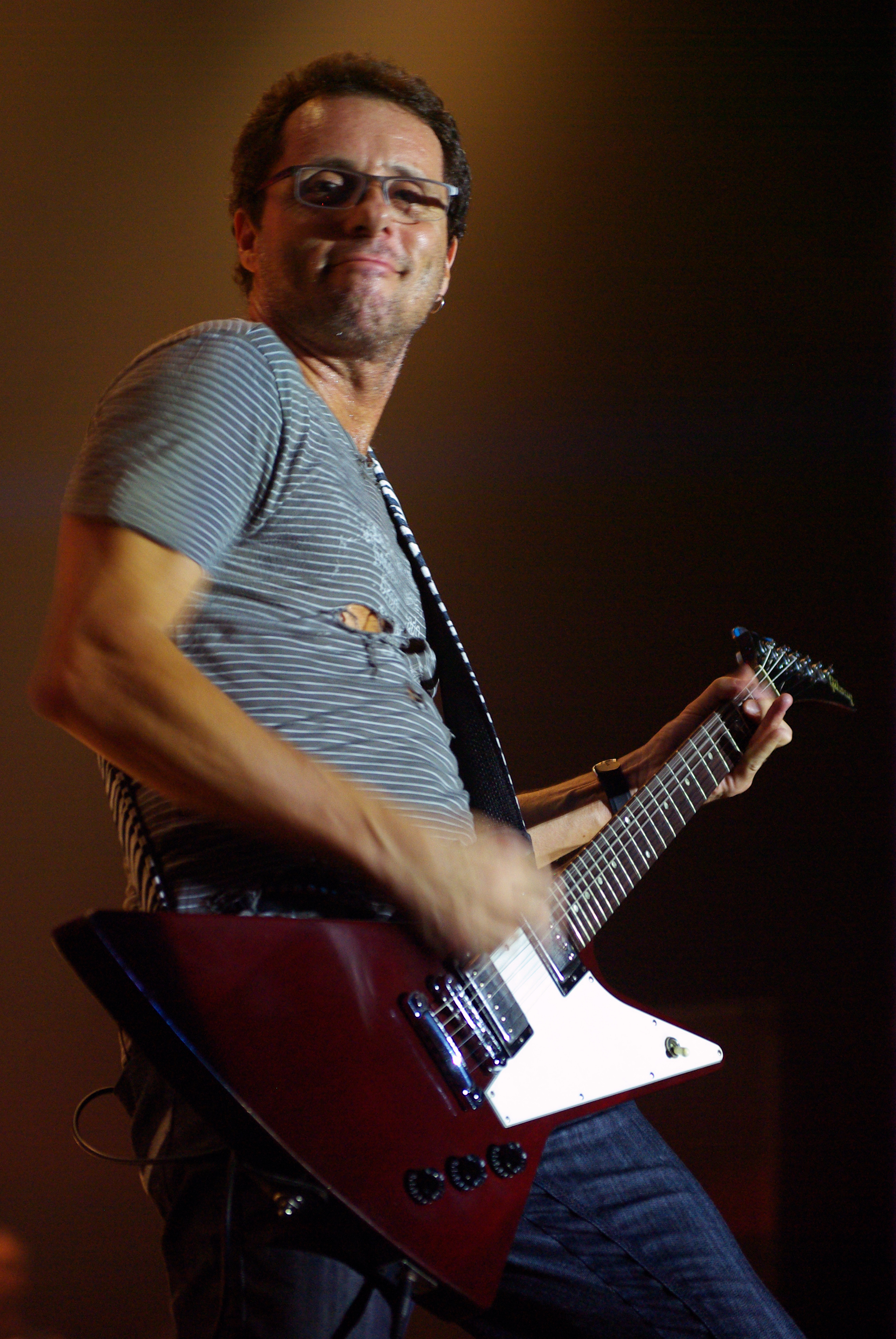
- Bellotto in 2009 during a Titãs & Os Paralamas do Sucesso show in Recife, Pernambuco, Brazil

Background information
- Born: Antonio Carlos Liberalli Bellotto; 30 June 1960 (age 66)
- Genres: Rock, punk rock, post-punk, alternative rock
- Occupations: Musician, songwriter, author
- Instruments: Guitar, vocals
- Years active: 1975–present
- Member of: Titãs
- Formerly of: Trio Mamão

Antonio Carlos Liberalli Bellotto (Portuguese pronunciation: [ˈtoni beˈlotu]; born 30 June 1960) is a Brazilian musician, songwriter and author, best known as the lead guitarist and occasional vocalist of the rock band Titãs. He has also written and released several books (including the Jabuti Prize winner Vento em Setembro), some of which have been adapted for the cinema.

== Childhood ==
Bellotto spent his childhood in the city of Assis, São Paulo. He decided to be a rock guitarist when he was a child. After hearing Jimi Hendrix albums, he composed his first songs on the guitar, while he explored other notable guitarists, like Keith Richards, Jimmy Page and Eric Clapton.

He also had a passion for books. He explored writers like Rubem Fonseca, Jorge Amado, Ernest Hemingway, Herman Melville and his famous Moby-Dick.

When he was 14 years old, he was given his first guitar. Although very interested in Jovem Guarda and Yellow Submarine from The Beatles, Bellotto only entered deeply in the rock music one year later, on a trip to the United States. When he returned to Brazil, he started living in the city of Assis, São Paulo. In his baggage, he brought albums from Muddy Waters and Robert Johnson. These influences, together with Caetano Veloso, João Gilberto and Luiz Melodia, some of his idols, contributed for his wide knowledge of music.

== Career in music ==
With his guitar, he toured colleges and bars singing and playing, with his own compositions, and opening shows of well known MPB names, like Jorge Mautner. With the help of Carlos Barmack, he got to know Branco Mello and Marcelo Fromer. The three formed the group Trio Mamão. At that time, Bellotto attempted to enter an architecture course at a college in Santos, but he quit it to dedicate his life only to music and writing. In 1982, little before the first performances with Titãs do Iê-Iê, his first daughter, Nina, was born to him and his wife Ana Paula Silveira.

== Books and other works ==
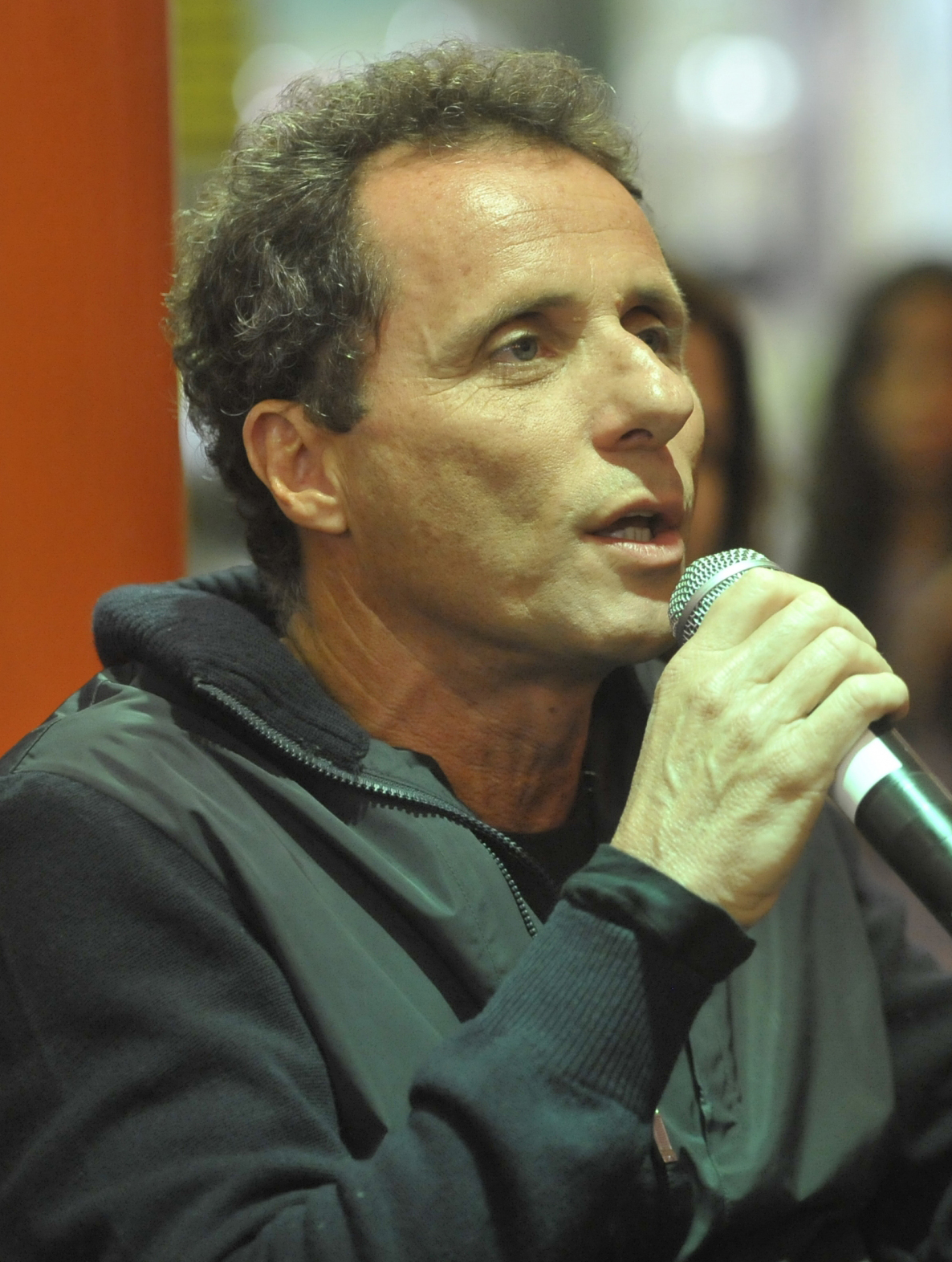
Bellotto at the 2013 Bienal do Livro in Rio de Janeiro.

In 1994, during a Titãs hiatus, Bellotto wrote and released via Companhia das Letras his book Bellini e a Esfinge (Bellini and the Sphinx), the story of a detective who lives in the suburbs of São Paulo. Two years later, Bellini reappeared in the second book, Bellini e o Demônio (Bellini and the Devil). In 2001, he released two more books: "BR 163 – Duas História na Estrada" (BR 163 – Two Stories on The Road) and "O Livro do Guitarrista" (The Guitarist Book), with clues, discographies and curiosities of the history of the rock. In August 2014, he released the fourth book of his Bellini series: Bellini e o Labirinto (Bellini and the labyrinth).

In 2002, the first adventure of Bellini was adapted for the movies, starring Fábio Assunção as the main character. In 2008, the second book was also adapted with Assunção reprising his role.

His 11th book, Vento em Setembro (Wind in September), released in June 2024, received the Jabuti Prize for Literary Novel in 2025.

In 1999, he debuted on television, appearing on the TV Futura Afinando a Língua (Tuning the Language) program, an informal electronic class of Portuguese language.

Until 2012, Tony Bellotto kept a column called "Cenas Urbanas" ("Urban Scenes") on Brazilian magazine Veja. Since June 2013, he has been writing for the newspaper O Globo every Sunday.

== Personal life ==
In 1985, Tony and his then bandmate Arnaldo Antunes were arrested for possession of heroin. During a police operation on Paulista Avenue to prevent robberies against taxi drivers, officers stopped the taxi in which Bellotto was (close to Trianon Park) and found 30 mg of the drug with him. Bellotto confessed to having bought the drug from Antunes, who was paid a visit by the police and Bellotto later that night and presented the 128 mg he had. Antunes was charged with drug trafficking while Bellotto was charged with possession only. He paid his bail of Cr$ 400,000 and awaited trial. Bellotto is now a supporter of drug liberalization. He is an atheist.

In September 2011 he lost his father, one day prior to the opening of Rock in Rio 2011, in which he performed with Titãs.

By the end of the 1980s, he was in a relationship with actress Giulia Gam. Married since 1990 to actress Malu Mader, Bellotto has two sons with her, João (born in 1995) and Antônio (born in 1997). All of them live in Rio de Janeiro.

== Discography ==
=== Guest appearances ===
| Artist | Album | Song(s) | Instrument(s) |
|---|---|---|---|
| Dulce Quental | Délica (1986) | "Diferentes" | Guitar |
| Theo Werneck | Leite Materno (1990) | "Todos" | Rhythm Guitar |
| Roberto Carlos | Acústico (2001) | "É Preciso Saber Viver" | Acoustic guitar |

== Works ==
- Bellini e a Esfinge (1995), Companhia das Letras
- Bellini e o Demônio (1997), Companhia das Letras
- BR 163 – Duas Histórias na Estrada (2001), Companhia das Letras
- O Livro do Guitarrista (2001), Companhia das Letras
- Bellini e os Espíritos (2005), Companhia das Letras
- Os Insones (2007), Companhia das Letras
- Bellini e o Labirinto (2014), Companhia das Letras
- No Buraco (2010)
- Machu Picchu (2013)
- Família (2015)
- Lô (2018)
- Dom (2020)
- Vento em Setembro (2024) - awarded with the Jabuti Prize for Best Literary Novel in 2025.
