= Participação Especial =

Compilation album by Cássia Eller
- Released: 2002
- Genre: Rock
- Label: Universal Music Group

Cássia Eller chronology
| Acústico MTV (Cássia Eller album) (2001) | Participação Especial (2002) | Dez de Dezembro (2002) |

Participação Especial is a compilation of duets by Cássia Eller with well-known artists of MPB and Brazilian pop. It was released after her death, in 2002. They were mainly taken from her MTV Unplugged library.

== Track listing ==
1. "Juventude Transviada" - with Luis Melodia.
2. "Milagreiro" - with Djavan.
3. "Relicario" - with Nando Reis.
4. "Mr. Scarecrow" - with Herbert Vianna.
5. "Um Tiro No Coração" - with Sandra de Sá.
6. "Malandragem" - with Barão Vermelho.
7. "De esquina" - with XIS and Nação Zumbi.
8. "A Rainha da Noite"/ "(I Can't Get No) Satisfaction" - with Edson Cordeiro.
9. "Luz Del Fuego" - with Rita Lee.
10. "Faça o Que Quiser Fazer" - Fábio Allman.
11. "Erva Daninha" - Guilherme de Brito.
12. "Você Passa, Eu Acho Graça" - with Noite Ilustrada.
13. "Não Deixe O Samba Morrer" - with Alcione.
14. "Quando A Maré Encher" - with Nação Zumbi.
