= Infernal (Nando Reis album) =

Studio album by Nando Reis
- Released: 2001 or March 2002
- Genre: Rock
- Label: WEA
- Producer: Nando Reis and Tom Capone

Nando Reis chronology
| Para Quando o Arco-Íris Encontrar o Pote de Ouro (2000) | Infernal (2001) | A Letra A (2003) |

Singles from Infernal
- 1. "Eu e Ela"

Infernal...But there is Still a Full Moon Shining Over Jalalabad or simply Infernal is the third solo album released by Brazilian musician Nando Reis. Most of the songs featured on this album were recorded by other artists or on other Reis albums. "E.C.T." and "O Segundo Sol" were performed live by Cássia Eller on her Acústico MTV album. "Eu e Ela", "Sua Impossível Chance", "Marvin" and "Cegos do Castelo" were recorded by Titãs when Nando Reis was still a member. "E.C.T.", "A Fila", "Me Diga" and "Fiz O Que Pude" were previously released on the album 12 de Janeiro. Skank's version of "Resposta" became a big hit in Brazil. Jota Quest first recorded "A Minha Gratidão É Uma Pessoa", which talks about a person who forgives another for their mistakes

The track "Onde Você Mora" was requested by Liminha to Nando Reis when the former was producing Cidade Negra's third album Sobre Todas as Forças. Reis then showed two different songs to co-songwriter Marisa Monte and she suggested he joined them. The section beginning with "Cê vai chegar em casa..." was then added to the rest of the song. When he presented the song to Liminha and the band, Reis thought they were unimpressed, but Liminha later called him and told him he heard his little daughter, who was in the studio when Reis played the song, humming the song and saying it was beautiful. Liminha then saw the song's potential.

== Background, recording and release ==
After releasing his previous disc, Para Quando o Arco-Íris Encontrar o Pote de Ouro, Reis toured with the American musicians who played in the album, but he was disappointed at the small success of the shows. Believing their quality to be worthy of more attention, he decided to "record the show", but with a studio album.

The album was recorded in two days, a Saturday and a Sunday, the first dedicated to rehearsals and the second to the recording itself. The songs were recorded as in a "live" performance and extra takes were only needed because producer Tom Capone wanted to add some things to some songs, like his guitar on "A Minha Gratidão É Uma Pessoa". The album was ready since 2000, but it was only released in the following year in order not to disturb Titãs's schedule.

"My Pledge of Love" was expected to be the first single, but the label didn't want to promote the album with an English-language song, so "Eu e Ela" was selected instead.

The album wasn't followed by a tour, but Reis did a release show at Canecão on 14 May 2002.

== Track listing ==
| No. | Title | Writer(s) | Length |
|---|---|---|---|
| 1. | "Infernal" (Infernal) | Nando Reis | 5:22 |
| 2. | "E.C.T." | Nando Reis, Carlinhos Brown and Marisa Monte | 5:07 |
| 3. | "A Minha Gratidão é Uma Pessoa" (My Gratitude is a Person) | Nando Reis | 4:47 |
| 4. | "Eu e Ela" (Me and Her) | Nando Reis | 4:43 |
| 5. | "O Segundo Sol" (The Second Sun) | Nando Reis | 4:00 |
| 6. | "Sua Impossível Chance" (Your Impossible Chance) | Nando Reis | 4:03 |
| 7. | "A Fila" (The Line) | Nando Reis and Marcelo Fromer | 3:36 |
| 8. | "My Pledge of Love" | Joe Stafford Jr. | 3:16 |
| 9. | "Cegos do Castelo" (Blind Ones from the Castle) | Nando Reis | 4:18 |
| 10. | "Resposta" (Answer) | Nando Reis and Samuel Rosa | 4:10 |
| 11. | "Onde Você Mora?" (Where Do You Live?) | Nando Reis and Marisa Monte | 4:24 |
| 12. | "Fiz o Que Pude" (I Did What I Could) | Nando Reis | 4:01 |
| 13. | "Me Diga" (Tell Me) | Nando Reis | 4:15 |
| 14. | "Marvin (Patches)" | R. Dunbar, G. N. Johnson, Nando Reis and Sérgio Britto | 4:40 |

== Personnel ==
As described by Reis in a video.

- Nando Reis — lead vocals and acoustic guitar
- Carlos Pontual — guitar
- Tom Capone — guitar
- Felipe Cambraia — bass
- Alex Veley — keyboards
- Barrett Martin — drums
