= Uma Estrela Misteriosa Revelará o Segredo =

Studio album by Nando Reis
- Released: 20 September 2024
- Recorded: Second semester of 2022
- Genre: Rock; soul; samba
- Length: 114:13 (Uma Estrela Misteriosa)
- Label: Relicário
- Producer: Barrett Martin; Felipe Cambraia

Nando Reis chronology
Jardim-Pomar (2016)	Uma Estrela Misteriosa Revelará o Segredo (2024)

Uma Estrela Misteriosa Revelará o Segredo ("A Mysterious Star Will Reveal the Secret"), sometimes referred to simply as Uma Estrela Misteriosa ("A Mysterious Star"), is the tenth studio album by Brazilian singer-songwriter Nando Reis. It is his first release of all-new material since Jardim-Pomar (2016).

It is a triple album, with each part receiving a word from the first half of the title as its name, and an additional bonus disc with the entire other half as its title.

It features several guest musicians, including Peter Buck (R.E.M.), Barrett Martin (Screaming Trees), Duff McKagan (Guns N' Roses), Krist Novoselic (Nirvana), Mike McCready (Pearl Jam) and Matt Cameron (Pearl Jam, Soundgarden).

== Background, production and recording ==
Before conceiving the project, Nando Reis considered releasing two albums: one called Vermelho Araçá ("Araçá Red"), in reference to the album Araçá Azul, by Caetano Veloso, which would contain an unreleased track named "Búfala Vietnamita no Arrozal" ("Vietnamese Female Buffalo in the Paddy Field"); and another one titled Reversões ("Reversions"), in which Reis would re-record songs penned by him but made famous through other singers' voices.

The effort was released soon after Reis finished a reunion tour with his former band Titãs. Originally, the album would be released in 2023, but was pushed back to the following year due to the tour with Titãs being extended as a consequence of its success. Reis feared he could lose his taste for the album after so long, but that didn't happen.

The project emerged spontaneously after Barrett Martin (Mad Season / Screaming Trees) invited Reis and his band to record two songs for his project Singing Earth. They gathered at the Da Pá Virada studio in São Paulo and ended up recording a total of ten tracks, with Martin writing ten additional ones. The final project featured 26 new songs and 4 re-recordings. The fourth album, according to Reis, was recorded and conceived after the other three.

It was Martin who managed to invite all the foreign guests for the album, due to his friendship with them. According to Reis, it was the diversity of participants which lead him to create so many songs, since only an exhaustive repertoire could accommodate all possibilities. According to a news story by Folha de S.Paulo, Mike McCready, Matt Cameron, Duff McKagan and Krist Novoselic participated with parts previously recorded for other purposes.

The final tracklist has songs composed in the last couple of years, old songs that were still unreleased and songs created during the recording sessions, covering the period from 1988 to 2024. They were recorded in São Paulo, in the second semester of 2022, and finished in Seattle in March 2023. The six bonus tracks were recorded in 2023, in Seattle, along with a seventh one that was eventually discarded, during a break in the American leg of the Titãs Encontro tour. These songs were recorded in a session at Avast! Studios which ended up being its last before it was renovated and downsized.

This was Reis's first album in which he kept sober during the whole process. He considers it his most ambitious project and believes he "swam against the tide" by eluding what he sees as a logic of music "pulverization" and "skip".

== Themes ==
The album title is inspired by The Adventures of Tintin's story The Shooting Star, which was translated as A Estrela Misteriosa in Brazil. At first, it would be simply titled Estrela Misteriosa, but when it became a triple work, Reis wanted to expand its name and his daughter Zoé suggested using the verse "uma estrela misteriosa" from the song "Estrela Misteriosa". Each word from the title then named one of the three main discs; a fourth album, with six bonus tracks, received the separate title of Revelará o Segredo ("Will Reveal the Secret") and is exclusive to the box set that Reis offered as an option for people buying the whole project on vinyl.

Nando mentioned George Harrison's All Things Must Pass as an inspiration for the album; another work by Harrison which also delighted Reis, the song "Bangla Desh", also inspired him to have two drummers on the same song (Martin and Cameron), since the former Beatle song had Ringo Starr and Jim Keltner performing together.

=== Song information ===
==== Uma ====
Nando labeled "A Tulha" as an autobiographical song, "sister" to "Pré-Sal" (off the 2012 album Sei). It was written in quintuple meter and has its structure based on texts by Reis. The address mentioned in the end of the lyrics leads to Reis birth house, in the Jardim Paulistano neighborhood.

"Terra em Flor" and "Dois Reveillóns" were originally written to be offered to Marisa Monte, who ended up not using them. "Em Si, Tais e Quais" was originally written during Reis's tour with duo Anavitória and offered to them, who also declined using it.

"Des-mente" speaks about his relationship with drugs; he begins it by expressing his desire to use them, only to reject them right after. Reis identified elements of Roberto and Erasmo Carlos, Raul Seixas, westerns and mariachi in "Coragem É Poder Mostrar".

==== Estrela ====
Nando described the second disc as "abstract network of nebulous tensions, of contrasts, of contradictions, of frictions and of desire", and its songs as having "a more mystical, esoteric and space aspect".

The title track "Estrela Misteriosa" was written during the COVID-19 pandemic, "in the early evening, with the intense frustration of the moment and the image of Jupiter: a quest, a trajectory, a trip".

"Composição" features Pretinho da Serrinha on the percussion arrangement and lists opposites. "Pedra Fundamental" is a love declaration. "Rio Creme" features Sebastião Reis and Pedro Lipa on the vocals, with Lipa doubling his voice in a falsetto. "Tentação" was born from the question "how to turn off the Sun?" - in it, the stars, unreachable due to their astronomical scales, are compared to abstract feelings.

"Estuário" is a declaration to Reis's wife Vânia, with each pair of the eight stanzas set in a region and the whole lyrics ranging from the evolution of their relationship until the birth of their first son, Theo. It is one of the two tracks originally created for the supergroup Levee Walkers (formed by Mike McCready, Duff McKagan and Barrett Martin) but eventually left out of the project, the other being "O Muro".

His new teetotaler era is approached on "Daqui Por Diante", a track originally written just to be performed on his family Christmas celebration. In its lyrics, Reis apologizes to his wife, children and grandson for his past behavior.

==== Misteriosa ====
"O Muro" uses echoes and has a melody composed by Barrett Martin in collaboration with Matt Cameron. It is one of two tracks originally made for the Levee Walkers, but which did not make it to the final cut, the other being "Estuário". In "Ginger e Red", Reis tells the story of a couple marked by differences, despite both being red-haired, but whose passion prevails. It features Lenny Kaye (Patti Smith).

"Na Lagoa" was created over two days from some reflections by Reis on a photograph which brought him some old memories. "Enfim", on the other hand, took only an hour to have its melody and lyrics created based on a demo tape recorded by Barrett and Peter Buck. "Tudo Está Aqui Dentro" also originated from a demo tape by Buck and speaks of missing a person who is no longer present.

"Diz pra Mim" also features Lipa and Sebastião Reis and is based on a poem that Reis had written in 2007. Nando used some sections of it during his tour with duo Anavitória. during the pandemic, on a Sunday in Jaú, he decided to finish the song. The piece, especially its vocals, reminded him of "You Are the Sunshine of My Life", by Stevie Wonder, and "1999", by Prince.

"Macapá" is a re-recording of a track that Reis wrote during a flight to the capital of Amapá. The closing track "Tome o Seu Lugar" features Krist Novoselic on the accordion and explores the paradox of loving a person with characteristics that initially make them unattractive, or that should make them unattractive.

==== Revelará o Segredo ====
"Corpo e Colo" is one of the four re-recordings and was also written during a flight; it was first used in the album Novela (2024), by singer Céu. "Rhipsalis", originally called "Janaína", was inspired by the death of a singer with whom Reis had a scheduled meeting, and the lyrics talk about loss and mismatch. The singer was a possible rising star tutored by Rick Bonadio, who in the 1990s sought Reis to compose a song for her. The pair arranged a meeting at Reis's house on a Monday, but she died in an accident and never showed up.

"Aparição" has a melody by Pedro Baby, which inspired Nando Reis to write a "faster and more fluid" song. "Depois de Amanhã" was originally created in 1996 and registered on a demo tape, being revisited during the pandemic. It features Fernando Magalhães, who also played on the demo version of nearly 30 years before.

"Firmamento" was born out of the merging of two different parts and some unfinished lyrics, being finished in Maceió. It establishes a parallel between the firmament and the desire for a loved person, when they promise the skies. "Para Voar" is the last re-recording of the album, originally conceived to be sung by a woman.

=== Art ===
The art project was authored by Reis's daughter, Zoé Passos, and Daniel Taglieri. The album covers consist of pictures of Reis in the Arembepe Beach in Camaçari, Bahia, in 1976, during a photo session that, according to him, alludes to the pictures of Araçá Azul, by Caetano Veloso. A symbol based on the stapelia flower was created by Passos and incorporated in the project.

== Release ==
"If you want to make [an album this size], go after it and do it! Fuck the market or streaming. For me, it was already the cassette tapes, then LP, then CD, then download. And I have always written songs with the acoustic guitar, paper and pen, and I see no difference, for me, nothing changed. People listen on YouTube too, they have more possibilities to listen [...] and I carry on."

— Nando Reis on Uma Estrela Misteriosa Revelará o Segredo

Each part of the album was released on a different date. Uma was released on 23 July (initially in an EP format containing five songs); Estrela and Misteriosa came out on 2 and 9 August, respectively, and the complete box set was put on sale on 27 July. On 20 September, the full version of the album was released on streaming services.

23 July also marked the album release event, held at a movie theater close to Paulista Avenue. There, Reis premiered a short documentary covering the album creation, directed by Raimo Benedetti.

The release was also marked by a country-wide, four-month tour from September to December 2024, featuring Buck and Martin, who couldn't stay longer given their foreigner status. Reis was also accompanied by longtime partners Walter Villaça on the guitar, Felipe Cambraia on the bass and Alex Veley on the keyboards, besides his son Sebastião Reis on the acoustic guitar. The first show was held at the Fortaleza de São José in Macapá on 20 September, marking the Spring equinox.

The album tour was founded on four pillars: inclusion (with the presence of a Brazilian Sign Language interpreter and disabled people aid professionals), overcoming (due to it being his first album as a teetotaler), sustainability (the shows minded protocols and indicators aligned with 17 UN Sustainable Development Goals) and authenticity.

== Reception ==
=== Critical reception ===
Professional ratings
Review scores
Source	Rating
G1	(Uma)
G1	(full album)
Pop Fantasma	7

Mauro Ferreira, who by the time of the project announcement called Reis's strategy "bold", gave Uma, the first part, maximum score on G1, saying that the album "sees the songwriter in a state of grace, between rock and ballads, presenting good melodies". In his review of the whole album, he once again pointed the boldness of releasing a quadruple album in the age of streaming but said Reis "rides without slipping through a dangerous road" and that the songs "are aesthetically refined for carrying Nando Reis's D.N.A. as a composer, which unifies the four albums." He praised the vigor that Reis still displays as a composer and concluded saying that he "reaches the end of this long authored road standing up strong and pointing to a bright future" for him.

Journalist Ricardo Schott, in his website Pop Fantasma, considered that the singer applied on the album Estrela "a certain heartland MPB based on rocking riffs, almost heavy base, lyrics that show different day-to-day details, and a certain idealized, return-to-the-past romanticism"; according to him, a characteristic of his repertoire. He also praised the brass arrangements, comparing them to "a mixture of popular 1970s MPB and Dexy's Mindnight Runners [sic]", and also comparing "Azul Febril" to "a MPB-ballad version of 'Ballet for a Rainy Day', by XTC". On the other hand, he considered some songs repetitive and that the singer "doesn't know how to mix metaphors and simple conversations [...]. In the triple album, this willingness to exaggerate in the images and have a tough ride through hermeticism becomes clear in many lyrics." He finished saying that the album was made for "true fans", but that as a product more broadly speaking, it has strong and weak points.

It was included in the list of 50 best albums of 2024 by the São Paulo Art Critics Association.

=== Tribute ===
When the album was fully released on digital platforms, ONErpm paid a tribute to Reis by naming a star in Capricornus - which corresponds to his Zodiac sign - after him.

== Track listing ==
Uma track listing
No.	Title	Length
1.	"A Chave" (The Key)	4:27
2.	"A Tulha" (The Bin)	5:18
3.	"Azul Febril" (Feverish Blue)	2:58
4.	"Terra em Flor" (Land in Flower)	4:40
5.	"Em Si, Tais Quais" (In Oneself, Just Like)	3:35
6.	"Coragem É Poder Mostrar" (Courage Is Being Able to Show)	4:21
7.	"Dois Réveillons" (Two Réveillons)	3:51
8.	"Des-Mente (Note: a word play that could mean both "un-mind" and "de-ny" or "be-lie".)"	4:31
9.	"Inverso" (Inverse)	2:49
Total length:		36:30

Estrela track listing
No.	Title	Length
10.	"Estrela Misteriosa" (Mysterious Star)	7:06
11.	"Composição" (Composition)	5:49
12.	"Pedra Fundamental" (Cornerstone)	4:13
13.	"Rio Creme" (Cream River)	5:14
14.	"Tentação" (Temptation)	5:23
15.	"Estuário" (Estuary)	3:21
16.	"Daqui por Diante" (From Now On)	5:01
Total length:		36:07

Misteriosa track listing
No.	Title	Length
17.	"O Muro" (The Wall (written by Nando Reis, Barrett Martin, Peter Buck))	3:47
18.	"Ginger e Red" (Ginger and Red)	4:40
19.	"Na Lagoa" (In the Lagoon)	5:36
20.	"Enfim" (Finally (Reis, Martin, Buck))	2:58
21.	"Diz pra Mim" (Tell Me)	5:07
22.	"Macapá"	5:48
23.	"Tudo Está Aqui Dentro" (Everything Is Here Inside (Reis, Martin, Buck))	3:40
24.	"Tome o Seu Lugar" (Take Your Place)	4:00
Total length:		41:36

Revelará o Segredo track listing
No.	Title	Length
25.	"Corpo e Colo" (Body and Lap (Reis, Kleber Lucas))	4:19
26.	"Rhipsalis"	3:54
27.	"Para Voar" (To Fly)	3:59
28.	"Firmamento" (Firmament)	4:15
29.	"Aparição" (Apparition Pedro Baby (melody), Reis (lyrics))	4:38
30.	"Depois de Amanhã" (After Tomorrow)	4:00
Total length:		35:05

== Personnel ==
Credits according to several sources

- Nando Reis — vocals and acoustic guitar
- Walter Villaça — guitar
- Peter Buck (R.E.M.) — guitar
- Mike McCready (Pearl Jam) — guitar on "Estuário"
- Andy Coe — guitar on "Rhipsalis"
- Lenny Kaye (Patti Smith) — guitar on "Ginger e Red"
- Sebastião Reis — twelve-string guitar
- Felipe Cambraia — bass
- Duff McKagan (Guns N' Roses) — bass and Moog synthesizer on "Estuário"
- Alex Veley — keyboards
- Joe Doria — Hammond organ on "Rhipsalis"
- Barrett Martin (Screaming Trees) — drums; synthesizer on "Rhipsalis"
- Matt Cameron (Pearl Jam) — drums on "Estrela Misteriosa", "Diz Para Mim" and "O Muro"
- Krist Novoselic (Nirvana) — accordion on "Tome o Seu Lugar"
- Pretinho da Serrinha — percussion arrangement on "Composição"
- Antonio Neves — wind arrangement on "Corpo e Colo"

Technical personnel

- Barrett Martin — production
- Felipe Cambraia — production
- Diogo Damascena — executive production
- Jack Endino — mixing
- Zoé Passos and Daniel Taglieri — art project
