= Voz e Violão – No Recreio – Volume 1 =

Live album by Nando Reis
- Released: September 2012
- Recorded: February–March 2012 at Soundhouse and Avast Studios in Seattle, USA; Mastered at Hanzsek Audio in Snohomish, USA
- Genres: Rock, pop rock, blues rock
- Length: 62:10
- Label: Independent
- Producers: Jack Endino and Os Infernais

Nando Reis chronology
Sei (2012)	Voz e Violão – No Recreio – Volume 1 (2012)	Jardim-Pomar (2016)

Voz e Violão – No Recreio – Volume 1 is the fourth live album by Brazilian singer-songwriter Nando Reis. The album features only Reis, without his supporting band Os Infernais. The performance was captured in an April night at Citibank Hall in São Paulo, with an attendance of 3,7 thousand people.

The idea of making an album in this format came in February 2015 after Reis took part of the project Sala de Estar (Living Room), at SESC Pompeia, in which he performed four times with his acoustic guitar only. He describes the experience of having decided the tracks of the album as follows: "I revisited some songs, in terms of hearing, of looking at my own discography. I listened to some songs again". One of the songs is previously unreleased: "Diariamente", written by him, but originally featured at Marisa Monte's 1991 album Mais.
