= Jardim-Pomar =

Studio album by Nando Reis e os Infernais
- Released: 11 November 2016
- Recorded: June 2015 – June 2016
- Studio: Soundhouse and Sunyata Sound (Seattle, United States; Estúdio Trama and Estúdio Space Blues (São Paulo, Brazil; Cia dos Técnicos (Rio de Janeiro, Brazil)
- Genre: Rock, pop rock, acoustic rock
- Length: 59:05
- Label: Relicário
- Producer: Barrett Martin e Jack Endino

Nando Reis e os Infernais chronology
Voz e Violão – No Recreio – Volume 1 (2015)	Jardim-Pomar (2016)

Singles from Jardim-Pomar
- 1. "Só Posso Dizer" Released: 16 September 2016

Jardim-Pomar (Garden-Orchard) is the eighth studio album by Brazilian singer-songwriter Nando Reis and his band Os Infernais. It was recorded in São Paulo, São Paulo, Brazil and in Seattle, Washington, United States, with the help of producers Barrett Martin and Jack Endino. Its lyrics deal with themes such as death, faith, absence of God and passions.

== Production and recording ==
Jardim-Pomar took one year to be prepared due to the fact that Reis had full control over everything, forcing him to work according to his financial situation. For him, "this time of maturation was very good for the music, because it could develop to places which otherwise it wouldn't". He also defined it as his "most complete and complex, most toilsome album, but it came out exactly like I wanted it". Released in November 2016, it was ready since April.

It was produced by Jack Endino (who had already produced his previous album, Sei, and some albums by Titãs, Reis' former band) and Barrett Martin, with whom he collaborated in the past. Commenting on their work, Reis said they "are friends and work together, but have totally different methods when producing an album. This brought a unique personality to each song, in spite of them being in a group inside the album, something I always seek".

For Reis, "the work is always a frame of the moment we live in. I prepared it in no hurry, in one year, and it is optimistic and excited, even with some lyrics dealing with sober themes." About the lyrical themes, he commented:

Making music is a way of organizing my thoughts, of trying to formulate them. There is no explanation, obviously. To compose is to put in words an intense and painful feeling. Because of that, I write a lot about things that happen to me. I talk about death, time and God's existence. This does not mean I am depressed. I feel absolutely happy, despite many of these songs having been written in moments of deep sadness and difficulty.

== Song information ==
Reis refers to the single "Só Posso Dizer" as "one of those songs that appear to emerge ready as soon as the first verse and melody show up, almost as in a dream. Jack Endino (producer) told me it looks like a song from another time". It is featured in two versions: one recorded in Seattle and a slower one recorded in São Paulo nine months later. Reis compares it to the song "Isn't It a Pity", by George Harrison, released under two different versions in All Things Must Pass (1970). The song was composed after his wife, Vânia, 2,5 years before the album release. "It is a beautiful song, somehow sad, but it is also a revision of a long love story which is never linear [...] it is about this love that resists detrition, about knowing what one wants, despite everything. The chorus summarizes it well and cites a verse by Lupicínio: 'Não consigo dormir sem seus braços' [I can't sleep without your arms]. It's shards and sections of a relationship which compose a beautiful mosaic." About the song and its versions, he also said:

When I composed this song, two or three years ago, I though: wow, this one is beautiful. I have a good single. It gives that click. Its chorus is clear and thrilling. I wrote the lyrics in a moment of great sadness. It is a simple song in terms of harmony. I remember the guitarist that recorded it back in Seattle had great difficulties in memorizing the notes. I couldn't understand why. Afterwards, Barrett Martins [sic] (producer, American) said nobody nowadays was doing songs like that because it was simple. It had a beginning, a middle and an end. After recording it in the United States, I thought it was slow. I didn't want a big ballad on the radio. It wasn't supposed to sound like that. My intention was to compose a more pop and faster version. That's what I did. And hence the two versions.

"Inimitável" talks about tolerance for differences and was written based on Reis's childhood with a deaf brother and a sister with cerebral palsy; both conditions resulting from their meningitis. "4 de Março" is another song dedicated to Vânia, which whom he was for over 30 years by the time of the album release. The date which names the song (4 March) refers to an important event to the couple, but Reis did not want to give any detail. "Concórdia" is the only previously released song, composed in the 90s and released in 2003 by Elza Soares in her album Vivo Feliz.

"Azul de Presunto" features, among other artists, the singers Branco Mello, Sérgio Britto, Arnaldo Antunes and Paulo Miklos, his former colleagues in Titãs, despite Antunes not being a member since the early 90s and Miklos having left the band between the recording sessions and the album release. About the song, the first studio recording featuring all of them since Tudo Ao Mesmo Tempo Agora (1991) by Titãs, Reis said: "We realized we did not gather in studio for 25 years and it couldn't be any different because the song has a Titãs thing. This song has much to do with our humor, it is provocative and awkward. In another interview, in which he commented the guest performances of other singers, he said:

The lyrics for this song says that the way things can be seen or described varies according to everyone's own point of view. It is not absolute. Then nothing would make more sense than having it sung by multiple people. And I wanted to gather my friends, artists I admire and my family. I knew Paulo, Arnaldo, Sérgio and Branco would have a good time because it is the kind of lyrics we could have done as Titãs. I was very happy, for liking those people and our story. And there, in our emotion, I realized that for 25 years the five of us did not walk into a studio together. I remembered everything we've done and what only we could do.

"Como Somos" is another collaboration of Reis with Skank's Samuel Rosa. Originally, it would be used in the band's 2014 album Velocia, but it was ultimately left aside, despite having been recorded as a demo. About its story, Reis says:

For the first time ever, Samuel did not like lyrics I wrote. [...] He clearly said they were shit. I thought there was really something wrong there. Then I devoted myself to writing wholly different lyrics. [...] The second attempt came out much better. It talks about the passage of time, the beginning, the middle and the end with different cycles. When he said he did not like it, I locked myself in my bedroom for four days until I finished it.

== Release ==
The album was released in digital, CD, cassette and vinil forms – in the latter case, due to its total length, it was divided in two parts: Jardim and Pomar.

== Reception ==
=== Critical reception ===
Professional ratings
Review scores
Source	Rating
O Globo	3.5/5 stars
G1	Favorable

Writing for O Globo, Leonardo Lichote says: "Reis conduces the listener through his 'Garden-orchard' as if he walked through the tragic-redemptive trajectory of existence – the thematic spine of the album. [...] In the 13 tracks, among Neil Young's grammar, lessons of tradition of the Brazilian music, sounds of steps and writing machines, Reis finds his own demons, more pacified than ever. And gods, be it by christian symbology or by love treated as a divinity – tracing in 'Jardim- pomar' a particular Eden."

Mauro Ferreira, at G1, said "Jardim – Pomar is an album commanded by division, already perceivable in its title" and concluded that "a result of mature reflections on themes such as love, life, death and God, Nando Reis harvest in Jardim – Pomar is big."

=== Accolades ===
The album won the 2017 Latin Grammy Award for Best Portuguese Language Rock or Alternative Album and the song "Só Posso Dizer" was nominated for Best Portuguese Language Song in the same award.

== Track listing ==
All tracks are written by Nando Reis, except "Como Somos", composed by Samuel Rosa and written by Reis.

No.	Title	Length
1.	"Infinito Oito" (Infinite Eight)	4:44
2.	"Deus Meu" (God of Mine)	3:21
3.	"Inimitável" (Inimitable)	3:55
4.	"4 de Março" (4 March)	5:37
5.	"Só Posso Dizer (São Paulo)" (I Can Only Say (São Paulo))	3:19
6.	"Concórdia"	4:28
7.	"Azul de Presunto" (Ham Blue (with Theo Reis, Arnaldo Antunes, Branco Mello, Sérgio Britto, Paulo Miklos, Luiza Possi, Sebastião Reis, Pitty, Tulipa Ruiz, Zoe Reis)	6:16
8.	"Lobo Preso em Renda" (Wolf Stuck in Lace)	3:43
9.	"Pra Onde Foi?" (Where Did (You) Go?)	6:29
10.	"Como Somos" (As We Are)	5:46
11.	"Água Viva" (Jellyfish)	3:07
12.	"Pra Musa" (For the Muse)	4:12
13.	"Só Posso Dizer (Seattle)" (I Can Only Say (Seattle))	3:58
Total length:		59:05

== Personnel ==
Credits according to multiple sources.

- Nando Reis – vocals and acoustic guitar
- Alex Veley – keyboards
- Diogo Gameiro – drums
- Felipe Cambraia – bass
- Jack Endino – production, guitar in "Infinito Oito", "Deus Meu" and "Inimitável"
- Theo Reis e Sebastião Reis – backing vocals in "infinito Oito" and "Azul de Presunto"
- Arnaldo Antunes, Branco Mello, Sérgio Britto, Paulo Miklos, Luiza Possi, Pitty, Tulipa Ruiz and Zoe Reis – backing vocals in "Azul de Presunto"
- Peter Buck (ex-R.E.M.) – guitar
- Mike McCready (Pearl Jam) – guitar
- Jimmy James – guitar in "Infinito Oito"
- Walter Villaça – guitar in "Infinito Oito" and "Lobo Preso em Renda"
- Fassbinder String Quartet – strings in "Concórdia" and "Água Viva"
- Vânia Mignone – art and cover
- Chris Hanzsek (Hanzsek Audio) – mastering
