= Com Você... Meu Mundo Ficaria Completo =

Studio album by Cássia Eller
- Released: 1999
- Genre: Rock
- Label: Universal Music Group
- Producer: Nando Reis

Cássia Eller chronology
Veneno Vivo (1998)	Com Você... Meu Mundo Ficaria Completo (1999)	Cássia Rock Eller (2000)

Com Você... Meu Mundo Ficaria Completo (In English: "With You... My World Would Be Complete") is a studio album by Brazilian singer Cássia Eller, released in 1999.

The idea of recording a more "relaxed" album came after Eller listened to her son saying that she wouldn't sing, but yell (thanks to her rock 'n' roll style of interpretation). At first, the album would feature only songs by producer Nando Reis, but he suggested she used songs of her own, given that her previous album (Veneno AntiMonotonia) was already a compilation of songs written by someone else (Cazuza).

It was during the sessions for this album and for Reis's solo album Para Quando o Arco-Íris Encontrar o Pote de Ouro that songs such as "O Segundo Sol" and "All Star" emerged. According to Reis, however, the first day of sessions was "a disaster" and Eller left the studio "infuriated". On the following day the producer even proposed that he resigned from his position, but Eller asked him to stay and they resumed work on the album.

In order to record "O Segundo Sol" ("The Second Sun"), they contemplated inviting Neil Young's supporting band Crazy Horse. Songwriter Reis says he's known of many theories of what the "second sun" could be; according to him, the track originated in a conversation he had with a friend who told him in a confident manner that, according to her beliefs, a second sun would eventually rise, to which he jokingly replied asking how didn't NASA know about that. Later, he regretted his behavior and wrote the song thinking of the importance of respecting different beliefs.

Eller's mother, Nanci Ribeiro, sings with her on "Pedra Gigante". Ribeiro was a singer before marrying Eller's father and taught her daughter how to sing. Reis once said the third strophe of "O Meu Mundo Ficaria Completo (com Você)" is about Eller.

== Cover ==
The album cover depicts Eller waring no pants, a wig and hairdresser Duda Molinos's t-shirt. By that time, Eller was bald and adopted an outlook that was considered "aggressive", so designer Gringo Cardia was tasked with finding a solution. Since Eller showed up for the photo session with clothes that he considered "hideous", he decided to make those interventions.

== Reception ==
Professional ratings
Review scores
Source	Rating
Allmusic	4/5 stars

Alvaro Neder called this her best album to date, and it was nominated for several Latin Grammys. The album went gold.

== Tracks ==
1. "O Segundo Sol"
2. "Mapa Do Meu Nada"
3. "Gatas Extraordinárias"
4. "Um Branco, Um Xis, Um Zero"
5. "Meu Mundo Ficaria Completo (Com Você)"
6. "Palavras Ao Vento"
7. "Aprendiz De Feiticeiro"
8. "Pedra Gigante"
9. "Infernal"
10. "Maluca"
11. "As Coisas Tão Mais Lindas"
12. "Esse Filme Eu Já Vi"
