= Nando Reis & Os Infernais =

Backing band for Brazilian musician Nando Reis

- Origin: Rio de Janeiro, Brazil
- Genres: Rock
- Years active: 1995 - present
- Labels: WEA, Universal
- Members: Nando Reis; Walter Villaça; Felipe Cambraia; Diogo Gameiro; Alex Veley; Micheline Cardoso; Hanna Lima
- Past members: Carlos Pontual; Luiz Brasil; Cesinha; João Vianna; Marcos Suzano; Barrett Martin; Dadi; Fernando Nunes

Nando Reis & Os Infernais is a Brazilian rock band founded by Nando Reis. It is the band that plays with him in studio and during live performances for his solo albums. From MTV Ao Vivo on, all albums by Nando Reis started being credited to both him and the band. Around the time of Sim e Não's release, he explained the change: "[...] I write songs and we decide the arrangements as a team. It was a gradual perception [the name change from Nando Reis to Nando Reis e os Infernais], when I realized that I liked to be seen as an artist who had a conversation with the band rather than as an artist backed by a band."

The name of the band, according to him, conveys the idea "of a hot and profane sound. I play the acoustic guitar, but I don't make MPB, my sound is much more connected to Rock."

Before the band was officially founded, keyboardist Alex Veley and guitarist Walter Villaça had already worked with Nando in his solo album Para Quando o Arco-Íris Encontrar o Pote de Ouro, which was recorded in Seattle.

Though Nando lives in São Paulo, the band is based in Rio de Janeiro.

== Members ==
=== Current members ===
- Nando Reis: lead vocals, acoustic guitar, songwriter
- Walter Villaça: electric guitar
- Felipe Cambraia: bass guitar
- Diogo Gameiro: drums
- Alex Veley: keyboards, backing vocals
- Micheline Cardoso: backing vocals
- Hanna Lima: backing vocals

=== Past members ===
- Carlos Pontual: guitar
- Luiz Brasil: acoustic guitar
- Cesinha: drums
- João Vianna: drums
- Marcos Suzano: percussion
- Barrett Martin: drums, percussion, backing vocals and accordion
- Dadi: bass
- Fernando Nunes: double bass

== Discography ==
=== Studio albums ===
- (1995) 12 de Janeiro
- (2000) Para Quando o Arco-Íris Encontrar o Pote de Ouro
- (2001) Infernal
- (2003) A Letra A
- (2006) Sim e Não
- (2009) Drês
- (2012) Sei

=== Live/video albums ===
- (2004) MTV ao Vivo: Nando Reis & Os Infernais
- (2007) Luau MTV: Nando Reis & Os Infernais
- (2010) MTV ao Vivo: Nando Reis & Os Infernais - Bailão do Ruivão
