= Para Quando o Arco-Íris Encontrar o Pote de Ouro =

Studio album by Nando Reis
- Released: 2000
- Recorded: 2000
- Genre: Rock
- Label: WEA
- Producer: Nando Reis and Jack Endino

Nando Reis chronology
12 de Janeiro (1995)	Para Quando o Arco-Íris Encontrar o Pote de Ouro (2000)	Infernal (2002)

Para Quando o Arco-Íris Encontrar o Pote de Ouro (For when the rainbow meets the pot of gold) is the second solo album released by Brazilian musician Nando Reis. The track "Relicário" was later recorded live by Cássia Eller. on her Acústico MTV album, and featured Reis himself.

Reis met producer Tom Capone during the production of his last album with Titãs, A Melhor Banda de Todos os Tempos da Última Semana, which was also recorded in Seattle. When Capone came to Brazil to pay a visit to the band, Reis picked him up at the airport and told him he was willing to record a solo album in Seattle, which Capone arranged for him.

== Track listing ==
All tracks written by Nando Reis

1. "Dessa Vez" (This time) - 3:15
2. "All Star" - 3:02
3. "Hey, Babe" - 3:50
4. "Quem Vai Dizer Tchau?" (Who's going to say bye?) - 3:24
5. "Frazes Mais Azuis" (Bluer sentences) - 4:41
6. "O Vento Noturno do Verão" (The night wind of the summer) - 4:22
7. "Para Quando o Arco-Íris Encontrar o Pote de Ouro" (For when the rainbow meets the pot of gold) - 4:41
8. "Nosso Amor" (Our love) - 2:50
9. "Eles Sabem" (They know) - 3:43
10. "No Recreio" (In the school break) - 3:58
11. "Relicário" (Relicarium) - 4:06

== Personnel ==
Per source:

- Nando Reis – lead vocals and acoustic guitar

=== Session members ===
- Walter Villaça – guitar
- Fernando Nunes – bass
- Alex Veley – keyboards
- Barrett Martin – drums, percussion, accordion

=== Guest performances ===
- Cássia Eller – backing vocals on "Hey Babe"
- Rogério Flausino – backing vocals on "Hey Babe"
- Cristina Braga – harp on "All Star"
- Peter Buck – bandolin eon "Dessa Vez" and guitar on "Frases Mais Azuis"
- Glauco Fernandez – violin, string arrangement on "Relicário"

=== Technical personnel ===
- Kib Beelman – cover picture
