= A Letra A =

Studio album by Nando Reis
- Released: 2003
- Recorded: 2003
- Genre: Rock
- Label: WEA
- Producer: Nando Reis

Nando Reis chronology
| Infernal (2001) | A Letra A (2003) | MTV Ao Vivo (2004) |

Alternative cover

A Letra A (The Letter A) is the fourth solo album released by Brazilian musician Nando Reis, and the first one after his departure from Titãs, where he sang and played the bass guitar. "Mesmo Sozinho" was previously recorded by Nando with Titãs on the album A Melhor Banda de Todos os Tempos da Última Semana, the last to feature him, and "Luz dos Olhos" was recorded live by Cássia Eller on her Acústico MTV album.

"Luz dos Olhos" was written by Reis under the request of Jorge Davidson, Sony's artistic director at that time, intending to use it on Cidade Negra's fourth album O Erê. The lyrics talk about seeing or not seeing a loved one, either literally or due to the physical absence of the person, and it also deals with Reis's strong myopia.

== Track listing ==
1. A Letra A ("The Letter A") – 4:15
2. E Tudo Mais ("And Everything else") – 5:19
3. Dentro do Mesmo Time ("In The Same Team") – 6:08
4. Hoje Mesmo ("Today") – 6:06
5. De Lhe Pra Te ("From You to You") – 4:42
6. O Meu Posto ("My Position") – 5:17
7. De Mãos Dadas ("Hand in Hand") – 2:46
8. Mesmo Sozinho ("Even Alone") – 4:45
9. Púrpura ("Violet") – 5:09
10. Luz dos Olhos ("Light of the Eyes") – 5:34
11. Um Simples Abraço ("A Simple Hug") – 4:33
12. Tão Differente ("So Different") – 6:10
- All music by Nando Reis
