= Luau MTV: Nando Reis & Os Infernais =

Live album by Nando Reis & Os Infernais
- Released: March 2007
- Recorded: January 21, 2007
- Venue: Praia Vermelha, Ubatuba, SP, Brazil
- Genre: Acoustic rock
- Length: 1:44:00
- Label: Universal
- Producer: Nando Reis

Nando Reis & Os Infernais chronology
Sim e Não (2006)	Luau MTV: Nando Reis & Os Infernais (2007)	Drês (2009)

Luau MTV: Nando Reis & Os Infernais is the second live album released by Brazilian band Nando Reis & Os Infernais, released on CD and DVD in 2007 through Universal Music. The album features a number of special participations: Andréa Martins (Canto dos Malditos na Terra do Nunca), Negra Li, Andreas Kisser (Sepultura), and Samuel Rosa (Skank). The song "Sou Dela" reached #10 at the Brazilian Top-40 Charts.

== Track listing ==
1. Sou Dela
2. A Letra "A"
3. Relicário
4. A Minha Gratidão é Uma Pessoa
5. As Coisas tão Mais Lindas
6. Luz dos Olhos
7. N
8. Espatódea
9. A Fila
10. Negra Livre
11. Bom Dia
12. Quem Vai Dizer Tchau?
13. Tentei Fugir
14. Sua Impossível Chance
15. Monóico
16. Eu e a Felicidade
17. Resposta
18. Por Onde Andei
19. Mantra (DVD bonus track)
20. O Segundo Sol (DVD bonus track)

== Personnel ==
=== Os Infernais ===
- Nando Reis: lead vocals, acoustic guitar
- Carlos Pontual: acoustic guitar, twelve-string guitar, backing vocals
- Alex Veley: keyboards, backing vocals
- Felipe Cambraia: acoustic bass guitar
- Diogo Gameiro: drums, backing vocals

=== Guest musicians ===
- Lan Lan: percussion
- Juju Gomes: backing vocals
- Micheline Cardoso: backing vocals
