= Canto dos Malditos na Terra do Nunca =

Brazilian alternative rock band

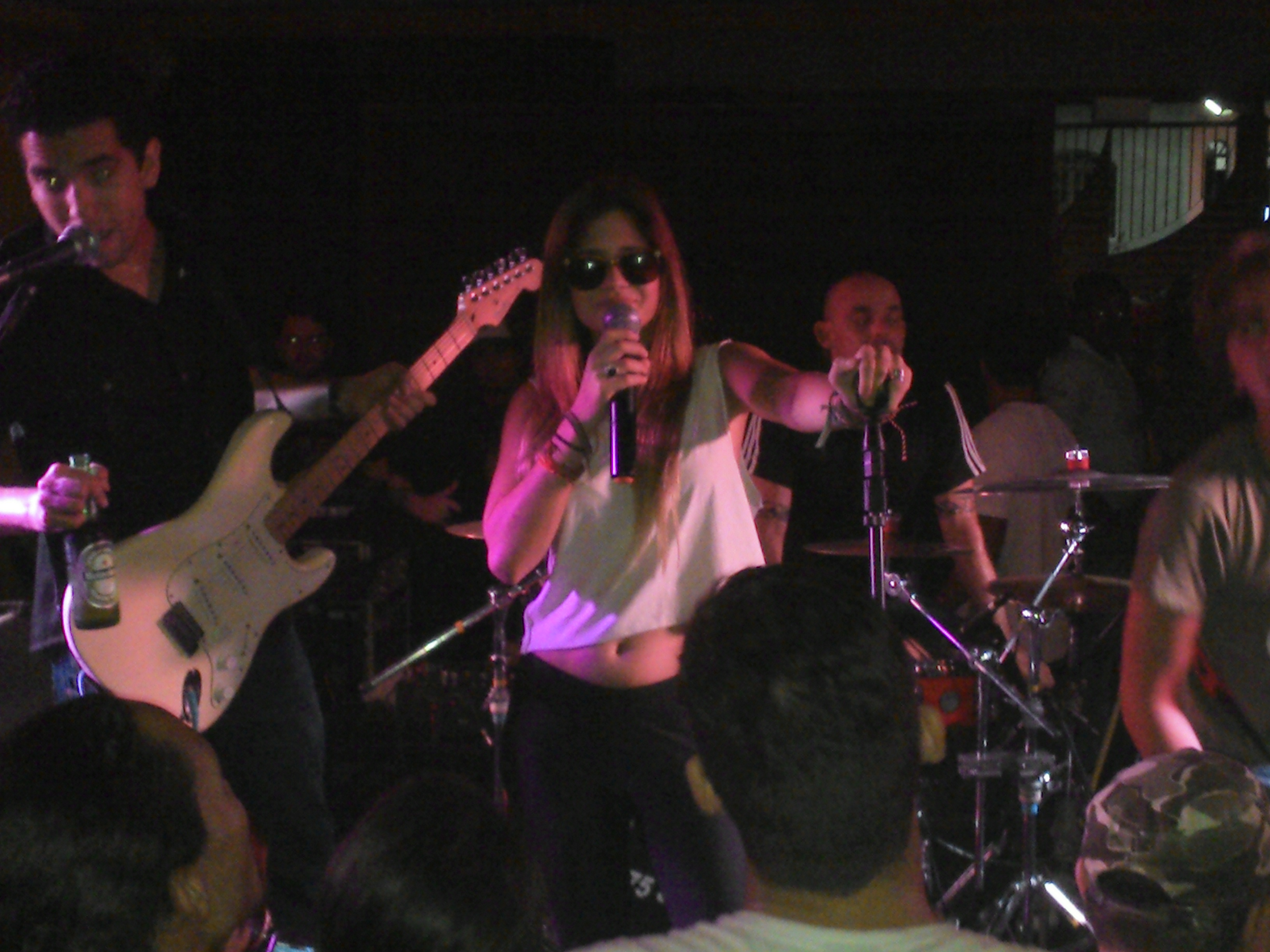
- CMTN performing live in Bahia, 2014

Background information
- Also known as: CMTN
- Origin: Salvador, Bahia, Brazil
- Genres: Alternative rock, hard rock, Post-grunge
- Years active: 2003–2007, 2012–present
- Labels: Warner Music; Epic Records
- Members: Andréa Martins; Danilo Castor; Helinho Sampaio; David Castor; Léo Cebola
- Website: cantodosmalditos.com.br

Canto dos Malditos na Terra do Nunca, abbreviated CMTN, is a Brazilian alternative rock band known for the deep voice of the female vocalist, Andréa Martins, and for their songs, which combine poetic lyrics and heavy guitars. After initial success, including heavy rotation of "Olha Minha Cara" on MTV Brasil and a "Best New Artist" nomination, they disbanded, but reunited in 2012 and have gone on tour.

== History ==
=== Beginning ===
From a young age, Andréa wrote music, saying "I wrote some things, and sang. When I learned to play guitar, I felt I had to write what came into my head." The band formed in 2003. The name of the band (literally, "Song of the Damned in Neverland") is a double homage: to the book Canto dos Malditos, by Austregésilo Carrano Bueno (which inspired the film Bicho de Sete Cabeças); and to Neverland (Portuguese: A Terra do Nunca) of Peter Pan (by Scottish author J. M. Barrie), an imaginary world where reality and fantasy combine. After recording two EPs, opening for Placebo, and appearing on Banda Antes on MTV Brasil, the band finally launched its self-titled studio debut. Canto dos Malditos na Terra do Nunca was released in October 2006 by Warner Music. The twelve tracks were written by Andréa (one co-written by Helinho), and produced by Carlos Eduardo Miranda and Tomaz Magno. The album combined the songs from their two EPs, along with two new tracks, one of them being "Descansar" (English: Rest), with participation by Andréa's brother, Ronei Jorge. The lyrics about doomed love, the deep female vocals, and bustling feedback combined on stages throughout the country, leading to a nomination for MTV Brasil's Best New Artist for 2006 for the video "Olha Minha Cara" (English: Look at My Face). In addition to the nomination, it was one of the most requested songs for three months on the network.

In January 2007, the band launched a virtual tour, playing their debut album for six shows at the Rádio Mix theater. The presentations were broadcast live on the internet and watched by more than fourteen thousand people. The same month, they opened for the Canadian band Simple Plan in Rio de Janeiro and São Paulo. At that year's Festival de Verão de Salvador, they heard a crowd of three thousand sing along. About this experience, Andréa said "I wrote these lyrics in my bedroom, in an intimate moment, and here it is, coming out of other people's mouths. I wrote this song from one feeling, and I'm causing another in these people, it's incredible." Andréa had the tables turned on her when she was invited to sing a duet of "Luz dos Olhos" with Nando Reis for his album, Luau MTV. About this experience, Andréa said "I couldn't believe it when they told me it was going to happen. When we were singing together, I felt uneasy in the beginning, due to the importance of the moment. Afterwards, I didn't want the song to end."

=== Break up ===
When the band was founded, they intended to go live in São Paulo. After the band achieved some success there, the band decided it was not viable to relocate, and they split amicably, with all members going on to pursue their own individual careers. Andréa went on to form Andréa Martins e o Império dos Sonhos, and Soldier of Love.

=== Reunion ===
On January 31, 2012, the band announced the promotion of a reunion concert to be performed with original lineup, 4 years after its dissolution. The event took place on March 3, 2012, at Groove Bar in Salvador. They later kicked off a tour, called "O Que Te Faz Voltar" (English: What Makes You Return).

== Members ==
- Andréa Martins - vocals
- Danilo Castor - guitar and backing vocals
- Helinho Sampaio - guitar
- David Castor - bass guitar
- Léo Cebola - drums

== Discography ==
=== Albums ===
- 2006 - Canto dos Malditos na Terra do Nunca
- 2017 - Travessia

=== EPs ===
- 2003 - Canto dos Malditos na Terra do Nunca (EP)
- 2005 - Olha a Minha Cara (EP)

=== Singles ===
- Olha Minha Cara (2006)
- Sinta Vontade de Ficar (2007)
- O Sol de Lá (2015)
