= Sim e Não =

Studio album by Nando Reis e os Infernais
- Released: 2006
- Recorded: 2006
- Genre: Rock
- Label: Universal Music
- Producer: Nando Reis

Nando Reis e os Infernais chronology
MTV ao Vivo (2004)	Sim e Não (2006)	Luau MTV (2007)

Sim e Não ("Yes and No") is the fifth album released by Brazilian band Nando Reis e os Infernais. It marks the first time Reis did not write songs under the influence of alcohol or other drugs. He commented that "It wasn't easy. I have always been seen as an artist connected to drugs and alcohol and that wasn't for nothing. I had this as a stimulant for my creative process. For a while, it had its benefits. But, with all that dependence and addiction, it started to be bad."

Two songs from the album were inspired by people close to Nando Reis: "Sim e Não" (inspired by his ex-girlfriend Nani) and "Espatódea" (inspired by his daughter Zoe). Commenting on the latter, Reis said once Zoe asked him when he would compose "O mundo é bão, Zoézinha"(lit. "The World Is Good, Little Zoe", but "good" is spelled as in the Brazilian hillbilly dialect), in a reference to the song "O Mundo É Bão, Sebastião!", which Reis had written for his son Sebastião. "I tried to postpone it, but she didn't fell for that. Then I did this song ("Espatódea"). Unlike my other children, there is a particularity in our case: she's red-haired. And the son touches this bond of ours. "Espatodea" is a tree that has an orange flower. Zoé's hair has an intense orange color because she's very white."

"Monoico" brings "a torrent of erotic images in which a man and a woman mix up until the difference between genres make no difference at all. Reis referred to it as "a manifesto".

== Track listing ==
1. Sim ("Yes") – 3:56
2. Sou Dela ("I'm Hers") – 4:58
3. N – 3:33
4. Monóico ("Monoicous") – 4:20
5. Os Seus Olhos ("Your Eyes") – 3:44
6. Santa Maria ("Saint Maria") – 3:21
7. Espatódea ("Spathodea") – 3:45
8. Para Luzir O Dia ("To Shine the Daylight") – 3:37
9. Como se O Mar ("As The Sea") – 4:08
10. Pra Ela Voltar ("For Her To Come Back") – 2:56
11. Caneco 70 ("Trophy 70") – 6:32
12. Ti Amo ("I Love You") – 5:21

== Personnel ==
Per sources:

- Nando Reis — lead vocals and acoustic guitar
- Felipe Cambraia — bass
- Carlos Pontual — guitar
- Alex Veley — keyboards
- Diego Gameiro — drums
- Carlito Carvalhosa — cover art
