= MTV ao Vivo: Nando Reis & Os Infernais - Bailão do Ruivão =

Bailão do Ruivão

Live album by Nando Reis e os Infernais
- Released: May 22, 2009
- Genre: Rock
- Length: 46:21
- Label: Universal Music

Nando Reis e os Infernais chronology
Drês (2009)	Bailão do Ruivão (2009)	Sei (2012)

Bailão do Ruivão (lit. "Big Party of the Big Redhead") is the third live album by Brazilian band Nando Reis e os Infernais. It is mostly consisted of cover songs. The show was recorded after two months of essays and is composed of Brazilian and international songs selected by Nando, apart from some of his own discography. The song "Could You Be Loved" was performed with Zafenate, the band of Reis' son Theodoro.

== Track listing ==
1. "Abertura" (Opening)
2. "Vênus" (Venus)
3. "Agora só Falta Você" (Now Only You Are Missing) (Rita Lee cover)
4. "Não Me Deixe Nunca Mais" (Don't Ever Leave Me Again)
5. "Whisky a Go Go" (Roupa Nova cover)
6. "Fogo e Paixão / My Pledge of Love" (Fire and Passion / My Pledge of Love) (first song is a Wando cover)
7. "I Can See Clearly Now" (Johnny Nash cover)
8. "Islands in the Stream" (Bee Gees cover, featuring Micheline Cardoso)
9. "Muito Estranho (Cuida Bem de Mim)" (Very Strange (Take Care of Me)) (Dalto cover)
10. "Could You Be Loved" (Bob Marley cover, featuring Banda Zafennate)
11. "You And I" (Rick James cover)
12. "Chorando se Foi" (Los Kjarkas cover, featuring Joelma and Chimbinha (from Banda Calypso)) (Crying he/she went away)
13. "Bichos Escrotos" (Freaky Critters) (Titãs cover)
14. "Gostava Tanto de Você" (I Used to Like You So Much) (Tim Maia cover)
15. "Você Pediu e Eu Já..." (featuring Zezé Di Camargo & Luciano) (You've Asked And I'm Already...)
16. "Severina Xique Xique" (Genival Lacerda cover)
17. "Você Não Vale Nada" (You Are Worthless) (Calcinha Preta cover)
18. "Frevo Mulher" (Frevo Woman) (Zé Ramalho cover)
19. "Lindo Balão Azul" (Beautiful Blue Balloon) (Guilherme Arantes cover)
20. "Créditos" (Credits)
21. "Do Seu Lado" (featuring Zezé Di Camargo & Luciano) (Beside You)
22. "Making Of"
