= E-collection =

Compilation album by Titãs
- Released: 2000
- Recorded: 2000
- Genre: Alternative rock, post-punk, new wave, punk rock
- Label: WEA
- Producer: Jack Endino

Titãs chronology
Titãs - 84 94 Dois (1994)	E-collection (2000)

E-collection is the fourth compilation album released by Brazilian rock band Titãs. It is a double album. The first CD features greatest hits of the group, and the second one, only rarities.

== Track listing ==
=== Disc one ===
#	Title	Length	Music
1	Cabeça Dinossauro	2:19	Branco Mello, Arnaldo Antunes and Paulo Miklos
2	Polícia	2:07	Toni Bellotto
3	Estado Violência	3:07	Charles Gavin
4	O Quê	5:38	Arnaldo Antunes
5	Jesus Não Tem Dentes No País Dos Banguelas	2:11	Marcelo Fromer and Nando Reis
6	Marvin	4:15	R. Dunbar, G. N. Johnson, version by Nando Reis and Sérgio Britto
7	Clitóris	3:46	Titãs
8	Domingo	4:05	Toni Bellotto and Sérgio Britto
9	Tudo Em Dia	2:50	Branco Mello, Arnaldo Antunes and Sérgio Britto
10	Televisão	3:40	Arnaldo Antunes, Marcelo Fromer and Toni Bellotto
11	Os Cegos do Castelo	4:50	Nando Reis
12	Miséria	4:21	Arnaldo Antunes, Sérgio Britto and Paulo Miklos
13	Eu Não Vou Dizer Nada	3:52	Marcelo Fromer, Tony Bellotto, Nando Reis, Sérgio Britto, Charles Gavin and Paulo Miklos
14	Pela Paz ("For the Peace")	3:45	Branco Mello, Nando Reis, Sérgio Britto, Charles Gavin and Paulo Miklos

"Pela Paz" was only released in the re-issue of Domingo. For that reason, it was not considered part of the rarities disc, and therefore it was featured on the hits disc.

=== Disc two ===
#	Title	Length	Music	Notes
1	Meu aniversário ("My Birthday")	4:21	Nando Reis	Featured on Reis' solo album 12 de Janeiro.
2	Eu Prefiro Correr ("I Prefer to Run")	2:13	Paulo Miklos, Sérgio Britto and Tony Bellotto	
3	Estrelas ("Stars")	2:08	Sergio Brito and Arnaldo Antunes	
4	Minha Namorada ("My Girlfriend")	1:51	Paulo Miklos, Charels Gavin and Arnaldo Antunes	
5	Aqui é Legal ("Here It's Cool")	1:43	Sérgio Britto and Arnaldo Antunes	
6	Saber Sangrar ("To Know How to Bleed")	2:45	Paulo Miklos, Tony Bellotto, Branco Mello and Arnaldo Antunes	
7	Porta Principal ("Main Door")	2:50	Arnaldo Antunes, Paulo Miklos and Nando Reis	
8	Planeta Morto ("Dead Planet")	2:49	Marcelo Fromer, Arnaldo Antunes and Ségio Britto	"Planeta Morto" was recorded within their album "A Era dos Halley".
9	Fazendinha ("Little Farm")	3:19	Marcelo Fromer, Arnaldo Antunes and Branco Mello	
10	A Marcha do Demo ("The March of the Devil")	2:57	Branco Mello, Paulo Miklos, Marcelo Fromer and Arnaldo Antunes	This song was written and performed by Titãs, Liminha, Paula Toller and Jorge Mautner under the name "Vestidos de Espaço". It was released with "Pipi Popô" as two carnaval songs.
