= MTV ao Vivo: Nando Reis & Os Infernais =

MTV Ao Vivo

Live album by Nando Reis e os Infernais
- Released: 2004
- Recorded: June 19, 20, 21, 2004
- Venue: Opinião, Porto Alegre, Brazil
- Studio: Estúdio AR, Rio de Janeiro (track 18)
- Genre: Acoustic rock
- Length: 1:17:58
- Label: Universal Music
- Producer: Nando Reis

Nando Reis e os Infernais chronology
MTV Ao Vivo (2004)	Sim e Não (2006)

Professional ratings
Review scores
Source	Rating
Allmusic	link

MTV Ao Vivo is the first live album released by Brazilian band Nando Reis e os Infernais.

== Previously unreleased songs information ==
=== "Mantra" ===
"Mantra" was featured on soundtrack of Rede Globo's telenovela Começar de Novo. It was written by Reis and Arnaldo Antunes and it was developed upon the sketch of a song he wrote under Paula Lavigne's request for a song to Ricky Martin at the time Reis was with Titãs recording Volume Dois.

According to Reis, many radio stations controlled by Protestants refused to air the song due to it promoting a different religion, which disappointed him and which he considered censorship.

Reis proposed inviting Hare Krishnas to perform in the song during a meeting with MTV and label Universal Music Group, but a few days before the trip to Porto Alegre, where the album was recorded, the label announced they wouldn't pay for the group's trip. Reis then decided to use his own money and bought some bus tickets for them. Following the song's first performance, which he says was well received by the audience, Universal's executives congratulated him and the song was later chosen as the album's single.

=== "Por Onde Andei" ===
"Por Onde Andei" was written after Reis was robbed in São Paulo. Before taking off with his car, one of the criminals rolled down the window, pointed a gun to him and yelled: "bum! bum!". Reis thought the criminal would really shoot and kill him and many thoughts passed through his mind.

The verse "e a falta é a morte da esperança" ("absence is the death of hope"), according to Reis, is wrong; the original verse said "e a morte é a falta da esperança" ("death is the absence of hope"), but he sang it wrong during the song's performance and this version became official.

=== "Pomar" ===
The track was co-written by Paulo Monteiro and performed by Reis's first band, Os Camarões, formed to perform at a music festival at Colégio Santa Cruz in 1979, in which they were winners.

=== "Do Seu Lado" ===
This track had already been released by Jota Quest on their MTV ao Vivo album. It was written by Reis in Taos, United States, where he was recording overdubs for his then future album A Letra A with producer and drummer Barrett Martin. Martin was dating a native American from a nearby pueblo. One night, Reis took part in a shamanic ritual and, soon after, he had a seat by Martin's fireplace and quickly wrote the song which, according to him, became his possibly greatest hit.

== Track listing ==
#	Title	Length	Music
1	Abertura ("Opening")	0:20	Nando Reis
2	O Mundo é Bom, Sebastião ("The World is Good, Sebastião")	4:18	Nando Reis
3	A Letra A ("The Letter A")	4:04	Nando Reis
4	O Segundo Sol ("The Second Sun")	5:13	Nando Reis
5	Mantra ("Mantra")	5:52	Nando Reis and Arnaldo Antunes
6	Luz dos Olhos ("Light of the Eyes")	6:54	Nando Reis
7	Por Onde Andei ("Where Had I Been")	4:11	Nando Reis
8	Marvin (Patches)	4:41	Nando Reis and Sérgio Britto
9	No Recreio ("In The Break")	3:58	Nando Reis
10	Quase Que Dezoito ("Almost Eighteen")	4:25	Nando Reis
11	Não Vou Me Adaptar ("I Won't Adapt Myself")	4:10	Arnaldo Antunes
12	All Star	4:02	Nando Reis
13	Meu Aniversário ("My Birthday")	0:44	Nando Reis
14	Relicário ("Relicarium")	4:25	Nando Reis
15	Os Cegos do Castelo ("The Blind from the Castle")	6:00	Nando Reis
16	Pomar ("Orchard")	5:15	Nando Reis and Paulo Monteiro
17	Do Seu Lado ("By Your Side")	5:03	Nando Reis
18	Mantra (Bonus Track, studio version)	4:24	Nando Reis and Arnaldo Antunes

== Personnel ==
- Nando Reis - vocals, acoustic guitar
- Alex Veley - keyboards, Hammond organ, clavinet, backing vocals on all tracks except "Meu Aniversário" and "Pomar"
- Carlos Pontual - guitar, backing vocals on all tracks except "Meu Aniversário" and "Pomar"
- Felipe Cambraia - bass guitar, backing vocals on all tracks except "Meu Aniversário" and "Pomar"
- João Viana - drums on all tracks except "Meu Aniversário", "Quase Que Dezoito" and "Pomar"

=== Session/guest musicians ===
- Diogo Gameiro - drums on "Quase que Dezoito"
- Banda Ultramen (on "Pomar")
  - Tonho Crocco - vocals
  - Pedro Porto - bass
  - Júlio Porto - guitar
  - Zé Darcy - drums
  - Leonardo Boff - keyboards
  - Marcito e Malásia - percussion
  - Anderson - DJ
- Guest musicians on "Mantra"
  - André Gomes - sitar
  - Acyuta, Pandaveya - kartalas
  - Acyuta, Adveita, Krishna, Priya, Ananda, Narayana, Gita, Hari Darshana, Maharaj, Lila - vocals
  - Hari Darshana - mridanga
  - Maurício Barros - keyboards
  - Maharaj - harmonium
