= Veneno Vivo =

Live album by Cássia Eller
- Released: 1998
- Genre: Rock
- Label: Universal Music

Cássia Eller chronology
Veneno AntiMonotonia (1997)	Veneno Vivo (1998)	Com Você... Meu Mundo Ficaria Completo (1999)

Veneno Vivo is an album by Brazilian singer Cássia Eller, released in 1998. It was recorded in 1997 as a live album, with songs sung by Eller in four languages. It was released three years before her "premature and unexpected death" (as translated from Brazilian Portuguese) at the age of 39.

== Track listing ==
1. "Brasil"
2. "Amor Destrambelhado"
3. "Obrigado (Por Ter Se Mandado)"
4. "Vida Bandida"
5. "Billy Negão"
6. "Farrapo Humano"
7. "Nós"
8. "Mis Penas LLoraba Yo"
9. "Todo Amor Que Houver Nessa Vida"
10. "Ponto Fraco"
11. "Faça O Que Quiser Fazer"
12. "Geração Coca-Cola"
13. "Todas As Mulheres Do Mundo"
14. "Eu Queria Ser Cássia Eller"
