= O Marginal =

Studio album by Cássia Eller
- Released: 1992
- Genre: Rock
- Label: PolyGram
- Producer: Wanderson Clayton

Cássia Eller chronology
Cássia Eller (1990)	O Marginal (1992)	Cássia Eller (1994)

Professional ratings
Review scores
Source	Rating
Allmusic	4/5 stars

O Marginal (In English: "The Outcast") is the second studio album by Cássia Eller, released in July 1992. It was recorded between January and April of the same year and produced by Wanderson Clayton with artistic direction from Mayrton Bahia.

The album had poor commercial results, causing her next release (Cássia Eller) to be written with more radio-friendly music.

== Track listing ==
O Marginal track listing (writing credits source )
No.	Title	Writer(s)	Length
1.	"Caso Você Queira Saber"	Beto Guedes, Márcio Borges
2.	"Sonhei que Viajava com Você"	Itamar Assumpção
3.	"Sensações"	Luiz Melodia
4.	"Teu Bem"	Paulo Barnabé
5.	"Amnésia"	Melodia, Cláudio Lobato
6.	"O Marginal"	Eller, Hermelino Neder, Luiz Pinheiro, Zé Marcos
7.	"Eles"	Eller, Otávio Fialho, Pinheiro
8.	"Aquele Grandão"	Lêda Pasta, Mário Manga (Mário Augusto Aydar)
9.	"Bobagem"	Lúcia Turnbull, Rita Lee
10.	"Comédia" (instrumental)	Tatá Spalla
11.	"Hear My Train A Comin' (Gettin’ My Heart Back Together Again)"	Jimi Hendrix
12.	"If Six Was Nine" (live in Aracaju - bonus track only available on the CD)	Jimi Hendrix
