= Cássia Eller ao Vivo =

Live album by Cássia Eller
- Released: 1996
- Genre: Rock
- Label: Polygram
- Producer: Cássia Eller/Rafael Borges

Cássia Eller chronology
Cássia Eller (1994)	Cássia Eller ao Vivo (1996)	Veneno AntiMonotonia (1997)

Professional ratings
Review scores
Source	Rating
Allmusic	4/5 stars

Cássia Eller ao Vivo (In English: "Cássia Eller Live") is an album by Brazilian singer Cássia Eller, released in 1996. This album is also known by the name Violões. It was recorded live in the Canecão theater in Rio de Janeiro in October 1995 and in the Tom Brasil in São Paulo in December 1995.

== Track listing ==
1. "E.C.T."
2. "Nenhum Roberto"
3. "Eu Sou Neguinha"
4. "Nós"
5. "1º de Julho"
6. "Na Cadência do Samba"
7. "Por Enquanto"
8. "Try A Little Tenderness"
9. "Malandragem"
10. "Não Amo Ninguém"
11. "Música Urbana 2"
12. "Socorro"
13. "Metrô Linha 743"
14. "Coronel Antonio Bento"
