= Drês =

Studio album by Nando Reis e os Infernais
- Released: May 22, 2009
- Genre: Rock, alternative rock
- Label: Universal Music
- Producer: Carlos Pontual and Nando Reis

Nando Reis e os Infernais chronology
Luau MTV (2007)	Drês (2009)	Bailão do Ruivão (2010)

Drês is the sixth album released by Brazilian band Nando Reis e os Infernais. The singer Ana Cañas guest appeared on the track "Pra Você Guardei o Amor". The song "Ainda Não Passou" nominated for the 2009 Latin Grammy Award of Best Brazilian Song (Portuguese Language). As of August 2010, the album sold around 18,000 copies.

The name of the album is a portmanteau of the words "Dri" (nickname of his ex-girlfriend Adriana Lotaif) and "três" (three, the number of songs dedicated to her in the album: "Hi, Dri!", "Driamante" and the title-track).

== Track listing ==
1. "Hi Dri"
2. "Ainda Não Passou" (It Still Didn't Pass) - 3:16
3. "Drês" - 4:16
4. "Conta" (Account) - 4:42
5. "Só Pra So" (Only for So) - 3:25
6. "Mosaico Abstrato" (Abstract Mosaic) - 4:38
7. "Pra Você Guardei o Amor" (For You I Kept Love) (featuring Ana Cañas) - 5:43
8. "Livre Como um Deus" (Free as a God) - 5:11
9. "Driamante" (Driamond) - 2:39
10. "Hoje Eu te Pedi em Casamento" (Today I Proposed to You) - 3:19
11. "Mil Galáxias" (A Thousand Galaxies) - 3:33
12. "Baby, Eu Queria" (Baby, I Wanted to) - 3:00

== Personnel ==
- Nando Reis – Lead vocals, acoustic guitar
- Carlos Pontual – Electric guitar
- Alex Veley – Keyboards
- Felipe Cambraia – Bass guitar
- Diogo Gameiro – drums
