= Dez de Dezembro =

Studio album by Cássia Eller
- Released: December 10, 2002
- Genre: Rock
- Label: Universal Music Group
- Producer: Nando Reis

Cássia Eller chronology
Participação Especial (2002)	Dez de Dezembro (2002)	Perfil (2003)

Dez de Dezembro (In English: "December 10th") is a posthumous album by Brazilian singer Cássia Eller, released on December 10, 2002. It was produced by Nando Reis and mixed by Carlo Bartolini. The album was nominated to the Latin Grammy for Best Portuguese Language Rock Album.

== Tracks ==
1. "Get Back"
2. "No Recreio"
3. "All Star"
4. "Eu Sou Neguinha"
5. "Nada Vai Mudar Isso"
6. "Fiz O Que Pude"
7. "Júlia"
8. "Nenhum Roberto"
9. "Little Wing"
10. "Vila Do Sossego"
11. "Só Se For a Dois"
