= Sobre Todas as Forças =

Sobre Todas as Forças is the third album by Brazilian reggae band Cidade Negra, released in 1994.

The track "Onde Você Mora" was requested by producer Liminha to Nando Reis. Reis then showed two different songs to co-songwriter Marisa Monte and she suggested he joined them. The section beginning with "Cê vai chegar em casa..." was then added to the rest of the song. When he presented the song to Liminha and the band, Reis thought they were unimpressed, but Liminha later called him and told him he heard his little daughter, who was in the studio when Reis played the song, humming the song and saying it was beautiful. Liminha then saw the song's potential.

== Track listing ==
#	Song	Composer(s)
1	"Mucama"	Bino Farias, Da Gama, Lazão e Toni Garrido
2	"Querem Meu Sangue"	Jimmy Cliff, Version:Nando Reis
3	"Downtown"	Lazão, Da Gama, Bino
4	"Luta de Classes"	Samuel Rosa, Chico Amaral
5	"Minha Irmã"	Toni Garrido, Da Gama, Charles Marsillac
6	"Doutor"	Bino Farias, Da Gama, Lazão, Toni Garrido
7	"Onde Você Mora?"	Nando Reis, Marisa Monte
8	"À Sombra da Maldade"	Toni Garrido, Da Gama
9	"Casa"	Toni Garrido, Lazão, Da Gama, Bino
10	"Pensamento"	Ras Bernardo, Lazão, Da Gama, Bino
