= Titãs – 84 94 Dois =

Titãs - 84 94 Dois

Compilation album by Titãs
- Released: 1994
- Recorded: 1994
- Genre: Alternative rock, post-punk, new wave, punk rock
- Label: WEA
- Producer: Jack Endino

Titãs chronology
Titãs - 84 94 Um (1994)	Titãs - 84 94 Dois (1994)	E-collection (2000)

Titãs – 84 94 Dois is the second compilation album released by Brazilian rock band Titãs, and also the second featuring the main hits of the band since their first album, Titãs, released in 1984, until their seventh one, Titanomaquia, released in 1993.

== Track listing ==
#	Title	Length	Music
1	Babi Índio	3:38	Branco Mello and Ciro Pessoa
2	Televisão	3:42	Arnaldo Antunes, Marcelo Fromer and Toni Bellotto
3	Autonomia	2:54	Arnaldo Antunes, Marcelo Fromer and Paulo Miklos
4	Cabeça Dinossauro	2:18	Paulo Miklos, Branco Mello and Arnaldo Antunes
5	Igreja	2:47	Nando Reis
6	Polícia	2:07	Toni Bellotto
7	Porrada	2:51	Arnaldo Antunes and Sérgio Britto
8	Tô Cansado	2:18	Branco Mello and Arnaldo Antunes
9	Bichos Escrotos	3:13	Arnaldo Antunes, Sergio Britto and Nando Reis
10	Jesus Não Tem Dentes No País Dos Banguelas	2:10	Nando Reis and Marcelo Fromer
11	Lugar Nenhum	2:57	Arnaldo Antunes, Charles Gavin, Marcelo Fromer, Sérgio Britto and Toni Bellotto
12	Desordem	2:57	Sérgio Britto, Marcelo Fromer and Charles Gavin
13	Nome Aos Bois	2:05	Nando Reis, Arnaldo Antunes, Marcelo Fromer and Toni Bellotto
14	Massacre	1:53	Sérgio Britto and Marcelo Fromer
15	AA UU	1:44	Sérgio Britto and Marcelo Fromer
16	32 Dentes	2:28	Branco Mello, Marcelo Fromer and Sérgio Britto
17	Saia De Mim	3:12	Titãs
18	Obrigado	1:08	Titãs
19	Será Que É Disso Que Eu Necessito?	2:48	Titãs
20	Nem Sempre Se Pode Ser Deus	2:13	Titãs
21	A Verdadeira Mary Poppins	2:21	Titãs
