= Sei (album) =

Studio album by Nando Reis e os Infernais
- Released: September 2012
- Recorded: February–March 2012
- Studios: Soundhouse Recording (Seattle, Washington); Avast! (Seattle, Washington); Mastered at Hanzsek Audio (Snohomish, Washington)
- Genres: Rock, pop rock, blues rock
- Length: 62:10
- Label: Independent
- Producers: Jack Endino and Os Infernais

Nando Reis e os Infernais chronology
Bailão do Ruivão (2010)	Sei (2012)	Voz e Violão – No Recreio – Volume 1 (2015)

Singles from Sei
- 1. "Sei" Released: September 11, 2012

Sei ("I know") is the seventh album by Brazilian band Nando Reis e os Infernais. It was recorded in Seattle, Washington, with the help of producer Jack Endino, who had already produced four studio albums for Titãs, Nando Reis' ex-band. According to Nando, Endino is the "right guy" to record Os Infernais' sound.

It was nominated for the Latin Grammy Awards of 2013 in the Best Brazilian Rock Album category.

== Background and recording ==
Sei is Reis' first independent album, after Universal Music Group refused to renew the deal they had with Reis. According to him, the process of going indie is irreversible. Also, he stated:

"Universal didn't want to renew our contract, and I wanted to have this experience. It doesn't make much difference in terms of art, the changes are more visible at the management side, in the conception of the selling of the album. It's something that I could only do this way if I was alone."

Reis also stated he didn't understand the mechanics of the recording companies, "such as the profit margin, with albums being sold for R$30,00 (US$15,00) and almost a year later they cost R$5,00."

According to Nando, "Lamento Realengo" was inspired by an apparently unauthorized DVD he bought, in which Bob Marley and The Wailers were practicing in 1973. "I got crazy [watching the DVD]. This ended in 'Lamento Realengo', which is half samba, half reggae. I even recorded with a nylon acoustic guitar, which I haven't played for some 15 years!"

The single "Sei" was used at the soundtrack of Rede Globo's telenovela Lado a Lado.

The opening track "Pré-Sal", his favorite song on the album, describes things related to Reis' childhood and had its name suggested by his sister. According to him, he gathered his siblings in his house and showed them the songs he would record. His sister then suggested that the opening track should be called "pre-salt" due to it being deep and prior to consciousness.

"Back in Vânia" was named after "Back in Bahia", by Gilberto Gil. Its verses reference episodes of Reis's life, as he explained in a video.

"Luz Antiga" had already been recorded by Ana Cañas in 2009 and it talks about a man who suffers as he realizes his loved one will not requite on the level he wished and it expresses his desires, longings and frustrations.

== Release ==
Seven tracks of the album were released via Radio UOL. The first one was the single "Sei", followed by "Pré-Sal", "Back in Vânia", "Pra Quem Não Vem", "Eu & a Bispa", "Coração Vago" and "Lamento Realengo". The entire album was later made available for streaming at Reis' official website, though one will need to log in via Facebook, Twitter, Google+ or other means in order to listen to the album.

The price of the album will be defined by fans, according to their opinions about the work. People who purchase it will also get special gifts, including access to the original recordings, extra songs and a poster with the album cover.

== Reception ==
Leonardo Lichote, from O Globo, praised the references to Brazilian music contained within the album, stating that "Nando strengthen his relations with a way that's already his: the way of a popular composer that transforms his pains and pleasures in verses filled with truth, be them as simple as "I love you" (there are thousands of variations in the album), be them codified almost exclusively for him".

== Track listing ==
All music is composed by Nando Reis.

No.	Title	Length
1.	"Pré-Sal" (Pre-salt)	7:03
2.	"Sei" (I Know)	3:18
3.	"Back in Vânia"	4:35
4.	"Pra Quem Não Vem (featuring Marisa Monte)" (For the Ones Who Are Not Coming)	4:14
5.	"Declaração de Amor" (Love Declaration)	5:00
6.	"Eu & a Bispa" (Me & the Bishop)	1:41
7.	"Coração Vago" (Vague Heart)	6:26
8.	"PERSxPECTIVA" (PERSxPECTIVE)	4:48
9.	"Ternura & Afeto" (Tenderness & Affection)	2:37
10.	"Luz Antiga" (Ancient Light)	4:09
11.	"Praça da Árvore" (Tree Square)	4:07
12.	"O Que Eu Só Vejo em Você" (What I Only See in You)	3:31
13.	"Sem Arrefecer" (Without Cooling)	2:01
14.	"Zer∅ Muit∅" (Zer∅ L∅t)	4:18
15.	"Lamento Realengo" (Realengo Regret)	4:22

== Personnel ==
Band

- Nando Reis – lead vocals, acoustic guitar, percussion
- Walter Villaça – guitars
- Felipe Cambraia – bass
- Diogo Gameiro – drums and backing vocals
- Alex Veley – keyboards, backing vocals, brass and backing vocals arrangements

Guest musicians

- Marisa Monte - lead vocals on "Pra Quem Não Vem"
- Jack Endino - production and guitars
- Barrett Martin - percussion and vibraphone
- Steve Scafalti - brass and bras arrangement
- Chris "CD" Littefiled and Jon Rÿser - brass
- The Ladies (Cora L. Jackson, Lisa G. Allen and Caprielle Symunne) - backing vocals
- Vicki L. Jordan - solo on "Pré-Sal" and "PERSxPECTIVA"
- Jim Hunnsdale - mandolin
- Bolitos e Crab #2 - whistles
- DJ G-Fog - tambourine on "Sei" and "O Que Eu Só Vejo em Você"
- Troy Swanson - keyboard programming

Technical staff

- Os Infernais - cop-production and arrangements
- Chris Hanzsek - mastering
- Jamie Crab #2 Hunsdale - direction
- Captain Larry - piloting
- Bushrooms - fueling
- Ana Estela Egreja - cover
- Márcio Niveo - graphical project
- Rodrigo Ribeiro - photography
- Juary Leocadio, Ivan Hods - retouch
