= Cássia Eller (1990 album) =

1990 studio album by Cássia Eller

Studio album by Cássia Eller
- Released: September 1990
- Genre: Rock; blues rock
- Language: Portuguese; English
- Label: Universal Music Group
- Producer: Mayrton Bahia; Wanderson Clayton

Cássia Eller chronology
Cássia Eller (1990)	O Marginal (1992)

Cássia Eller is the debut album by Brazilian recording artist Cássia Eller, released in 1990. It contained covers of songs from artists such as John Lennon and Paul McCartney, Cazuza, and Renato Russo.

== Background ==
Cássia Eller was born in Rio de Janeiro in 1962 . After passing through several cities of the country during his life, he arrived in Brasília in the 1980s, and there he went through various musical experiences, in addition to making friends with Zélia Duncan. Until the end of the decade, Cássia made numerous presentations in local and music festivals, emphasizing by the serious and powerful vocal tone.

In 1988, Cássia moved to São Paulo, where she could achieve greater professional projection. There she met her uncle, Wanderson Clayton, who worked as a producer for the 14 Bis group. He showed him a Beatles song on his guitar, which impressed him. From then on, Wanderson would try to make Cassia the "greatest singer in that country," according to his words.

== Recording ==
Immediately, he put her in a studio owned by a friend. From this first recording came 10 songs in voice and guitar, which would become part of the final repertoire. The bands surprised by the selected composers, the great majority belonging to the independent circuit. There were names like Hermelino Neder, Bocato, Mário Manga and Arrigo Barnabé. During this period Cassia returned to Brasília, with no hope of success in her endeavor, while Wanderson tried to get money to mix the material in hand.

After editing the tape, Wanderson took it to Rio, where PolyGram headquarters were located. There he worked Mayrton Bahia, producer of groups like Legião Urbana and who knew Wanderson of works with the 14 Bis in EMI. After waiting for about six hours, he left the recording for Mayrton and left. When he got home, he got a call from him. When he returned to the office, Mayrton offered a three-disc deal with Cassia. With this, Cássia returned to Rio de Janeiro, and the production process of Cássia Eller began.

A band to accompany the singer was assembled (according to Wanderson, the process was complicated by the enormous shyness of Cassia). With the band set up, the rehearsals of the opening ten tracks began in a studio at Cosme Velho. Mayrton, who believed that Cassia was a rough diamond that should not be cut, made a point of letting the musicians take turns and musical decisions. Alongside this, Cássia made her show for the press at the Mistura Fina show house in Ipanema. Wanderson bought her a dress and a high shoe, which she threw away in the first song. In that period, until 1994, when it stopped being produced by the uncle, Cássia wore clothes with style more "marginalized" and without great preoccupations of style. On the same day, it was reported that Wanderson himself would be the producer of the debut album.

At first, PolyGram's claim was that Cassia had a pop repertoire and a better-looking image. Mayrton Bahia, however, believing in the potential of his young and rebellious figure, defended his style against the commercial department. "The record company did not believe her, wanted her to have good manners, she was more little girl," says Mayrton.

The album counted on the participations of Frejat (that composed "Barraco") and Peninha, in the percussions. As the musicians of the band had a strong jazz influence, the Baron Red guitarist proposed that they return to the musical origins of the performer, essentially sidewalks in rock. Despite the initial rejection of this idea, it was soon accepted by them.

The cover of the album, initially, would be signed by the artist André Peticov, but was not approved by the singer or by his uncle. So, we chose a photo taken at a show in São Paulo, made by Eliane Torino. For the back cover, Peticov gave another idea, this time approved: Cassia would literally kick the bucket. The photo was taken on Barra beach, where the singer spent some time repeating the act. Once the production was over, it was time to set the release. Initially, Globo commissioned the label to release a version of the song Meu Bem, Meu Mal, which would be the opening theme of the eponymous soap opera, released in 1990. The recording, arranged by Cássia's own band, was not approved by the record company or the broadcaster, which considered it out of context. "Cássia was yelling," says Wanderson Clayton, who still holds the unreleased recording.

To release the album, six music videos were recorded. One, For While, the album's first single and its first hit, was aired on Fantástico in 1990. The other five were shown by the then newly released MTV Brasil in the following months. Initially, all eleven tracks recorded would have music videos, but due to tight budget, the idea had to be abandoned.

== Reception ==
Professional ratings
Review scores
Source	Rating
allmusic	4/5 stars

Alvaro Neder of Allmusic says, despite not selling well, it was "the aggressiveness of her low voice and the dry arrangements" on Eller's debut album that brought her national recognition. The controversial song "Rubens", expressing ambiguous sexuality, was censored.

== Tracks ==
No.	Title	Writer(s)	Length
1.	"Já Deu Para Sentir (Tutu)"	Itamar Assumpção, Marcus Miller
2.	"Rubens"	Mário Manga (Mário Augusto Aydar)
3.	"Barraco"	Jorge Salomão, Roberto Frejat
4.	"Que O Deus Venha"	Cazuza, Clarice Lispector, Roberto Frejat
5.	"Eleanor Rigby"	John Lennon, Paul McCartney
6.	"Otário"	Bocato (Itacyr Bocato Júnior)
7.	"O Dedo De Deus"	Arrigo Barnabé, Mário Manga (Mário Augusto Aydar)
8.	"Por Enquanto"	Renato Russo
9.	"Lullaby"	Cássia Eller, Márcio Faraco
10.	"Não Sei O Que Eu Quero Da Vida"	Arrigo Barnabé, Hermelino Neder
11.	"Tutti Frutti" ((CD only))
