= Cristiano Alves =

Brazilian clarinetist

Cristiano Alves is a Brazilian clarinetist.

Alves was born in Rio de Janeiro and was taught by José Carlos Castro. He holds a Master's degree from the School of Music at Universidade Federal do Rio Grande (UFRG). He is first clarinet of the Orquestra Sinfônica Brasileira and the Petrobrás Sinfônica, and teaches clarinet at UFRJ. He also performs at masterclasses in Mostra Internacional de Música em Olinda, a music festival in Olinda, and at the famous Festival de Campos do Jordão, the most important Classical Music Festival in South America.

== Discography ==
- Marcas D'Água, with Tamara Ujakova. Biscoito Fino, 2005.
