= Veneno AntiMonotonia =

Veneno Antimonotonia

Studio album by Cássia Eller
- Released: 1997
- Genre: Rock
- Label: Polygram

Cássia Eller chronology
Cássia Eller ao Vivo (1996)	Veneno Antimonotonia (1997)	Veneno Vivo (1998)

Veneno Antimonotonia (In English: "Anti-Monotony Poison") is an album by Cássia Eller, released in 1997. The album is a homage to Brazilian singer and composer Cazuza, with re-recordings of some of his songs.

== Track listing ==
1. "Brasil"
2. "Blues Da Piedade"
3. "Obrigado (Por Ter Se Mandado)"
4. "Menina Mimada"
5. "Todo Amor Que Houver Nessa Vida"
6. "Billy Negão"
7. "Bete Balanço"
8. "A Orelha De Eurídice"
9. "Só As Mães São Felizes"
10. "Ponto Fraco"
11. "Por Que A Gente É Assim?"
12. "Preciso Dizer Que Te Amo"
13. "Mal Nenhum"
14. "Pro Dia Nascer Feliz"
