= 12 de Janeiro =

Studio album by Nando Reis
- Released: 1994
- Recorded: 1994, at the Estúdios Cia. dos Técnicos (RJ)
- Genre: Rock
- Label: WEA
- Producer: Nando Reis

Nando Reis chronology
| 12 de Janeiro (1994) | Para Quando o Arco-Íris Encontrar o Pote de Ouro (2000) |

12 de Janeiro (January 12th) is the first solo album released by Brazilian musician Nando Reis. The track "E.T.C" was later recorded live by Cássia Eller on her Acústico MTV album, and became a big hit. Until November 1995, it had sold 25,000 copies, a disappointment for Reis, who considered that the label was to blame because "some songs performed well on the radio, but there were no CDs at the stores". By August 1997, it had reached the 27,300 mark.

The track "Meu Aniversário" was composed as a heavier version for Titãs' 1993 album Titanomaquia, but the band rejected it because it was still too light and different from the rest of the tracks. Nevertheless, it was featured at the band's rarities compilation album E-collection. The track "Bom Dia" was inspired by his children Theodoro and Sophia.

Reis invited his friend Cássia Eller to do duet with him on the song "Fiz o Que Pude", but the label denied it, according to him, claiming that the presence of a more famous artist would "shift the audience's focus".

== Track listing ==
All music is composed by Nando Reis, unless otherwise noted.

| No. | Title | Music | English translation | Length |
|---|---|---|---|---|
| 1. | "Bom Dia" | | Good Morning | 4:35 |
| 2. | "Meu Aniversário" | | My Birthday | 3:07 |
| 3. | "Me Diga" | | Tell Me | 4:02 |
| 4. | "Do Itaim Para O Candeal" | | From Itaim to Candeal | 3:46 |
| 5. | "Foi Embora" | | It's gone | 3:47 |
| 6. | "O seu lado de cá" | | Your this side | 4:51 |
| 7. | "Fiz o Que Pude" | | I've Done What I Could | 3:21 |
| 8. | "A Fila" | Nando Reis and Marcelo Fromer | The Line | 3:26 |
| 9. | "E.C.T." | Nando Reis, Carlinhos Brown and Marisa Monte | | 3:43 |
| 10. | "Para Querer" | Nando Reis and Marisa Monte | In order to Want | 3:58 |
| 11. | "A Urca" | | | 3:12 |
| 12. | "A Menina e o Passarinho" | | The Girl and the Birdy | 6:42 |
