= Acústico MTV: Cássia Eller =

Acústico MTV

Live album by Cássia Eller
- Released: 2001
- Recorded: March 7 and 8, 2001, in São Paulo Brazil
- Genre: Rock
- Length: 61:56
- Label: Universal Music
- Producer: Luiz Brasil, Nando Reis

Cássia Eller chronology
Cássia Rock Eller (2000)	Acústico MTV (2001)	Participação Especial (2002)

Acústico MTV is a CD/DVD by Brazilian recording artist Cássia Eller, produced by Nando Reis and Luiz Brasil. It was recorded on March 7 and 8 of 2001 in São Paulo and released the same year. The project included guest appearances from Nando Reis, A Nação Zumbi and the rapper Xis. Acústico MTV is the Brazilian version of MTV Unplugged.

== Overview ==
Acústico MTV is Eller's final album before her death on December 29, 2001. The album consists of seventeen songs from various authors, such as Nando Reis, Renato Russo, Cazuza, John Lennon and Paul McCartney, among others.

For the recording of the album, the entire team met for three weeks at the São José farm.

The album opener is a cover of "Non, je ne regrette rien", by Édith Piaf, a song suggested by Reis. Initially, he had thought of having Eller cover Janis Joplin, but he thought the American singer was too obvious a choice and recalled his times listening to Piaf with his mother, when she was still alive. During the sessions, he began questioning if the song was a good idea and a furious lightning hit the farm, followed by a tremendous thunder. Reis saw that as a message from his late mother encouraging him to stick to the idea.

In "Relicário", there's a guitar line that co-producer Luiz Brasil associates with the Brazilian National Anthem, but that Reis had actually created having "In the Light", by Led Zeppelin, in mind. The song "De Esquina" was suggested by his son Theo, who was a fan of Brazilian hip hop.

== Reception ==
The album won the Latin Grammy for Best Brazilian Rock Album in 2002. It was one of the top twenty best-selling albums in Brazil in 2002. In 2022, it was elected as one of the best Brazilian music albums of the last 40 years by a O Globo poll which involved 25 specialists, including Charles Gavin, Nelson Motta, and others.

== Tracklisting ==
1. "Non, Je Ne Regrette Rien" (Michel Vaucaire / Charles Dumont)
2. "Malandragem" (Cazuza / Frejat)
3. "E.C.T." (Nando Reis / Marisa Monte / Carlinhos Brown)
4. "Vá Morar Com O Diabo" (Riachão)
5. "Partido Alto" (Chico Buarque)
6. "1º De Julho" (Renato Russo)
7. "Luz Dos Olhos" (Nando Reis)
8. "Todo Amor Que Houver Nessa Vida" (Cazuza / Frejat)
9. "Queremos Saber" (Gilberto Gil)
10. "Por Enquanto" (Renato Russo)
11. "Relicário" (Nando Reis)
12. "O Segundo Sol" (Nando Reis)
13. "Nós" (Tião Carvalho)
14. "Sgt. Pepper's Lonely Hearts Club Band" (John Lennon / Paul McCartney)
15. "De Esquina" (Xis)
16. "Quando A Maré Encher" (Fábio Trummer / Roger Man / Bernardo Chopinho)
17. "Top Top" (Os Mutantes / Arnolpho Lima Filho)

== Personnel ==
=== Musicians ===
Name	Instrument	Tracks
Cássia Eller	lead vocals, acoustic guitar	All
Luiz Brasil	acoustic guitar, mandolin, backing vocals	1–7, 9, 11–17
Alberto Continentino	double Bass	1, 8–9
Paulo Calasans	piano, Hammond organ	1–2, 6–8, 11, 15, 17
João Viana	drums	1–9, 11–14, 16–17
Bernard Bessler	violin	1, 6–7, 9–10, 12
Dirceu Leite	clarinet, flute, bass clarinet	1, 7, 9–10, 12, 15
Cristiano Alves	clarinet	1, 7, 9–10, 12
Yura Ranevsky	cello	1, 6–7, 9–10, 12
Walter Villaça	acoustic guitar	2–8, 11–17
Fernando Nunes	acoustic bass	2–7, 11–14, 16–17
Lan Lan	percussion, Vocals	2–7, 9, 11–17
Thamyma	percussion	4–7, 9, 11–17

==== Guest appearances ====
- Nando Reis (Track 11)
- Xis (Track 15)
- Nação Zumbi (Track 15 and 16)

=== Universal Music Team ===
Function	Who
Directors	Luiz Brasil, Nando Reis
Artistic Director	Max Pierre
Artistic Manager	Ricardo Moreira
Recorded by	Flavio Sena
Recording Assistant	Zorro
Mixing	Flavio Sena
Mixing Assistant	Guilherme Medeiros
Recruiting	Barney
Mastering	Ricardo Garcia
Graphic Project	Luciane Ribeiro
Art Direction	Gê Alves Pinto
Graphic Coordination	Patrícia Fernandes

=== Video Team ===
Function	Who
Musical Direction	Luiz Brasil, Nando Reis
Executive Producers	Ronaldo Villas, Felipe Casqueira
Assistants	Marcos Krepp, Gisella Chinelli and Isabella Viggiano
Sound Recording	Colado
Sound technician	Carlos Martau
Video technician	Aurélio Kauffman
Technical Assistant	Wlademiro "Vavá" Furquim
Roadies	Kadú Carlos, Clauber Reis e Sombra Jones

=== MTV Team ===
Function	Who
Direction	Rodrigo Carelli
Assistant Director	Chica Barros
Executive Producer	Adilson Tokita
Production Coordinator	Leonardo Lessa
Scenery	Kiko Canepa
Lighting	Césio Lima
Costuming	Juliana Maia
Operations Manager	Miguel Lopez
Marketing	Ana Cláudia Barbieri e Marco Antônio Piza
