= Tom Capone =

Brazilian music producer and guitar player

- Born: January 1, 1966; Rio Negro, Brazil
- Died: September 2, 2004 (aged 38)
- Occupation(s): Brazilian music producer and guitar player

Tom Capone (January 1, 1966 – September 2, 2004), born Luiz Antonio Ferreira Gonçalves, was a Brazilian music producer and guitar player. Born in Rio Negro/PR, Brazil, he died in Los Angeles hours after leaving the 2004 Latin Grammy Awards show when his motorcycle collided with a car. He had been nominated for five Latin Grammy awards. His production for Maria Rita's eponymous debut won Latin Grammys for "New Star", MBP song: "A Festa" and "MPB Record of the Year".
