= Edson Cordeiro =

Brazilian singer

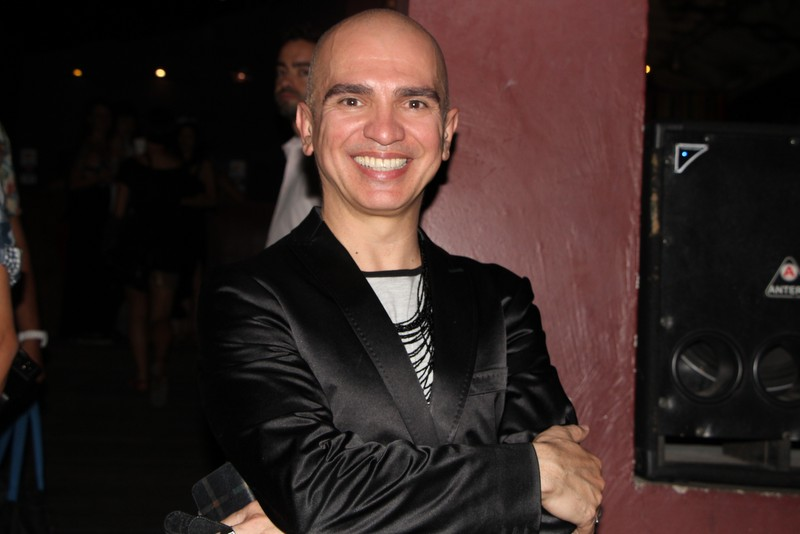
Cordeiro, 2015

Edson Cordeiro (born February 9, 1967) is a Brazilian sopranist countertenor and pop and jazz singer

== Life and career ==
Cordeiro was born in Santo André, São Paulo, Brazil. He began singing at 6 years old when he joined a church choir called "Cordeirinhos do Senhor". He became famous as a street singer. He had his first TV performance with his own version of the aria of the "Queen of the Night" (W. A. Mozart). In 1996, he won the Prêmio Sharp for the best Brazilian pop singer.

Cordeiro first toured Europe in 1995. He was greatly acclaimed after his concerts, especially in Germany, where he also performed on national TV. His repertoire ranges from opera and lieder to traditional Brazilian folksongs to 1970s disco music. It includes covers of Nina Hagen, Janis Joplin, Grace Jones, Prince and Édith Piaf, along with medieval psalms. As a vocalist, Cordeiro is comparable to Peruvian singer Yma Sumac, who in her prime also had a four-octave range. Cordeiro covered one of Sumac's songs, "Babalú". Cordeiro performs mainly in South America, with a recent brief stint in Germany.

He has lived in Germany for over a decade due, he says, to the homophobic harassment he had suffered in Brazil. He is married to German writer Oliver Bieber.

== Discography ==
- 1992 Edson Cordeiro
- 1994 Edson Cordeiro 2
- 1996 Terceiro Sinal
- 1998 Clubbing
- 1998 Disco Clubbing Ao Vivo
- 1999 Disco Clubbing 2 – Mestre de Cerimônia
- 2001 Dê-se ao Luxo
- 2005 Contratenor
- 2007 Klazz Meets the Voice, Klazz Brothers & Edson Cordeiro (Released only in Europe)
- 2008 The Woman's Voice (A Homage To Great Female Singers) (Released only in Europe)
- 2015 Paradiesvogel
- 2017 Fado
