= Cássia Eller =

Brazilian singer (1962–2001)

- Eller performing in 2001
- Born: Cássia Rejane Eller; December 10, 1962; Rio de Janeiro, Brazil
- Died: December 29, 2001 (aged 39); Rio de Janeiro, Brazil
- Occupations: Singer; Composer; Instrumentalist
- Years active: 1990–2001
- Partner: Maria Eugênia Vieira Martins (c. 1987-2001)
- Children: Chico Chico
- Musical career
- Genres: Pop rock; blues rock; samba
- Instruments: Vocals; guitar; drums
- Labels: Universal Music; Som Livre

Cássia Rejane Eller (Portuguese: /ˈkasjɐ ʁeˈʒɐni ˈɛleʁ/) (December 10, 1962 – December 29, 2001) was a Brazilian singer, composer, and multi-instrumentalist, regarded as one of the greatest representatives of Brazilian rock in the 1990s.

She came to prominence in the early 1990s and performed a mix of rock and MPB. Eller released five studio albums in her lifetime: Cássia Eller (1990), O Marginal (1992), Cássia Eller (1994), Veneno AntiMonotonia (1997) and Com Você... Meu Mundo Ficaria Completo (1999). Her sixth studio album, Dez de Dezembro (2002), was released posthumously. Eller's most successful album was Acústico MTV – Cássia Eller (2001), selling over 1 million copies. She was ranked as the 18th-greatest vocalist and 40th-greatest Brazilian musician by Rolling Stone Brasil. On December 29, 2001, Eller died at the age of 39 of a heart attack caused by a malformation of her heart.

== Biography ==
Cássia Rejane Eller was born in Rio de Janeiro to Altair Eller, an Army paratrooper sergeant, and Nanci Ribeiro, a housewife. Her name was suggested by her grandmother, who was devoted to St. Rita of Cascia.

Eller moved with her family to Belo Horizonte, Minas Gerais at 6 years old. When she was 10 years old, she moved to Santarém, Pará, and at age 12 returned to Rio. Her interest in music began when she received a guitar as a gift at age 14. She learned how to speak English and play guitar by playing Beatles songs. At the age of 18, the family moved again, this time to Brasília. There, Eller sang in a choir, auditioned for musicals, worked in two operas as a showgirl, sang frevo, blues, and rock, and performed as a singer for a forró group. She was also part of the first electric trio in Brasília, called Massa Real, and played the Surdo drum in a samba group. She played and sang in several bars (including Bom Demais). In 1981, she appeared in a play by Oswaldo Montenegro.

A year later, at age 19, wanting her personal freedom, she moved to Belo Horizonte, there finding work as a bricklayer and living in a small rented room. Her work, as well as frequent performance commitments, prevented her from completing high school. When she returned to Brasília, she replaced a friend as a secretary at the Ministério da Agricultura, but she was fired on the third day and decided to commit herself to singing.

== Career ==
Characterized by her deep voice and her musical eclecticism, Eller played the music of composers of Brazilian rock, MPB, pop, rap, samba, and international rock such as Cazuza, Renato Russo, Rita Lee, Caetano Veloso, Chico Buarque, Nando Reis, Riachão, Janis Joplin, Jimi Hendrix, The Beatles, John Lennon, and Nirvana. She cited her greatest musical influences as Lennon, Paul McCartney, and Nina Simone.

Though short, her musical career was prolific, with ten recorded albums over the course of twelve years. Helped by her uncle, she recorded a demo tape with the song "Por Enquanto" by Renato Russo in 1989. Eller's uncle brought the tape to PolyGram, which resulted in Eller being hired by the label. Her first participation on a record was in 1990, in Wagner Tiso's album titled "Baobab".

Her first album, Cássia Eller, was released by PolyGram in 1990. In 1992, she released her second album, O Marginal. In 1994 her third album was released, titled Cássia Eller, which contained the hit "Malandragem," an unpublished song by Cazuza. Her fourth album, Veneno AntiMonotonia, an homage to Cazuza containing re-recordings of his songs, was released in 1997, .

In 1992, Eller shared vocals with Edson Cordeiro on the song "A Rainha da Noite / I Can't Get No (Satisfaction)", a mash-up of Mozart's Queen of the Night Aria with the Rolling Stones' "(I Can't Get No) Satisfaction." The song was included on Edson Cordeiro's self-titled album.

Influenced by her 4-year-old son, Chicão, who remarked that his mother shouted too much and that he preferred listening to singer Marisa Monte, Eller began singing in a calmer manner towards the end of the 1990s. Eller released the album Com Você...Meu Mundo Ficaria Completo in 1999, produced by Nando Reis, featuring the hits "O Segundo Sol" and "Palavras ao Vento". Eller and her mother, Nanci Ribeiro, sang together on the track "Pedra Gigante." Eller remarked about her mother, "She was a singer before marrying my dad. It was her who taught me everything. She sang Dolores Duran, Maysa. I was excited, and she was super nervous. She didn't know where to put the headphones, but she gave a top-notch recording."

On January 13, 2001, Eller performed on the World Stage at the Rock in Rio festival for an audience of nearly 200,000 people. She fulfilled the request of her son, Chicão, and included the song "Smells Like Teen Spirit" by Nirvana on her set list at the festival. Dave Grohl, ex-drummer of Nirvana and vocalist of Foo Fighters, lauded Eller's version.

Eller declared herself to be an interpreter of other people's work, having composed only three of the songs she recorded: "Lullaby" (with Márcio Faraco) on her first album, Cássia Eller, and "Eles" and "O Marginal" (with Hermelino Neder, Luiz Pinheiro and Zé Marcos) on the second album, O Marginal (1992).

== Final months ==
2001 was an especially productive year for Eller. On January 13, 2001, she performed at Rock in Rio III, singing baião, samba and MPB classics in a rock style. Other artists performing on the same day included R.E.M., Foo Fighters, Beck, Barão Vermelho, and Fernanda Abreu.

Between May and December of 2001, Eller performed at 95 shows. This included recording a live DVD and MTV Unplugged, between March 7 and 8 in São Paulo. The project was directed by Nando Reis, and the band contained such successful musicians as Luiz Brasil and his daughter Tamima. Guest musicians included violinist Bernardo Bessler and clarinetist Cristiano Alves, among many others. The album was composed of 17 tracks, and the DVD included a making-of documentary amongst other bonus features. The album has sold more than a million copies to date and became the biggest hit in Eller's career.

In August of the same year, Eller performed at the MTV Video Music Brazil awards alongside Rita Lee, Roberto de Carvalho and Nando Reis (performing Os Mutantes' "Top Top").

== Death ==
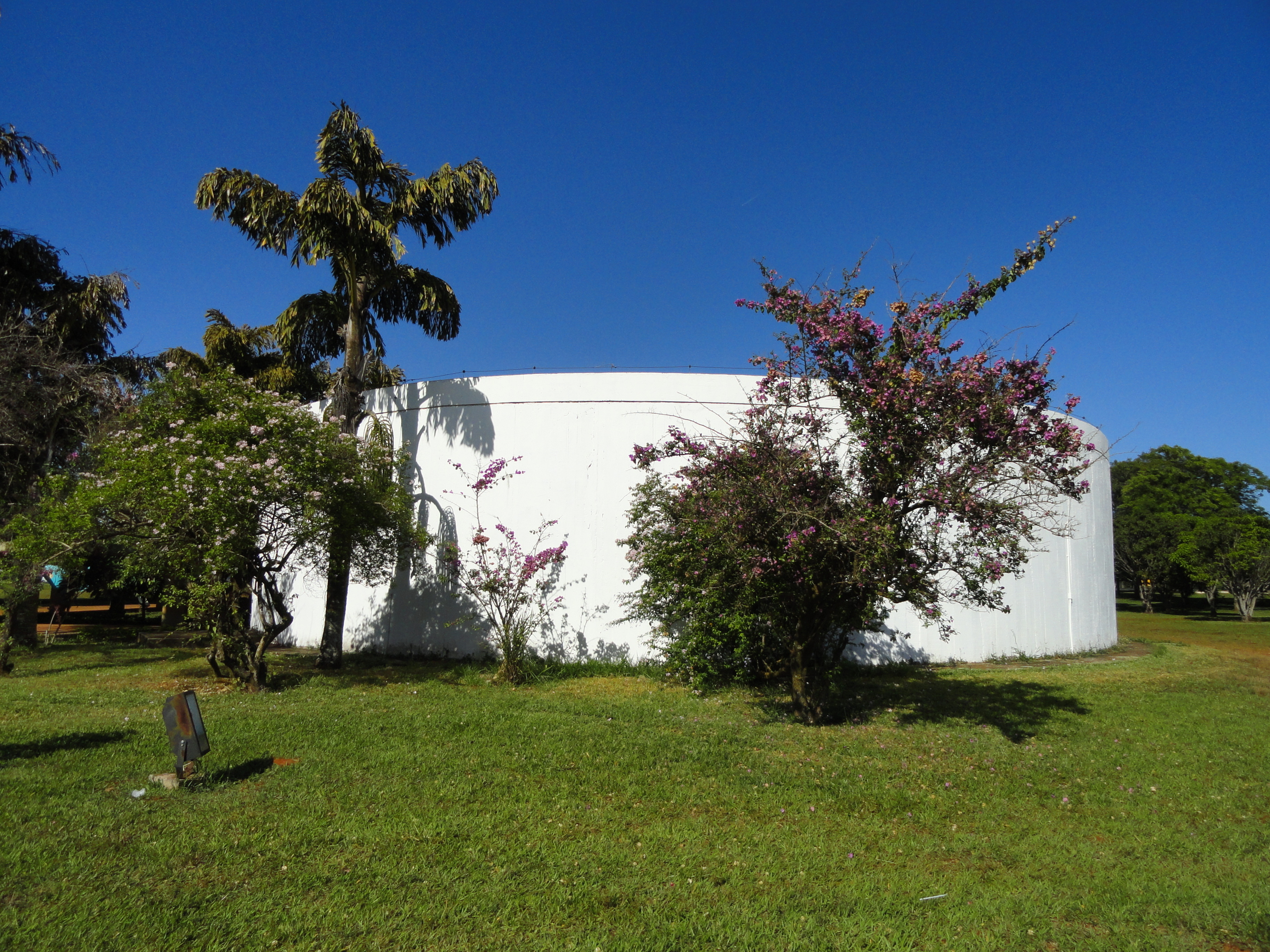
Cássia Eller Room in Brasília. This space, opened in 1977 with the name Sala Funarte, underwent a major renovation in 2001 and was renamed the following year as a posthumous tribute to the singer.

Cássia Eller died on December 29, 2001, in the Santa Maria clinic in the Laranjeiras neighborhood, in the south of Rio de Janeiro, after suffering three cardiac arrests due to sudden myocardial infarction. She was 39 years old and at the peak of her career. She had been hospitalized at 1 pm and was placed in the Intensive care unit on arrival at the hospital. According to her manager, the singer had been complaining of nausea due to overwork. The symptoms, he said, were thought to be the result of stress caused by her busy performance schedule, saying, "She had been working a lot. In seven months, she's done over a hundred shows." The possibility of Eller's death being related to a drug overdose was raised by the media, but the idea was dismissed by the coroner's report of the Medical Institute of Rio de Janeiro after a necropsy. The coroner's report stated that Eller died of a heart attack caused by a malformation of her heart, and the toxicology report found no trace of alcohol or drugs in her body. Histopathological exams revealed Eller had heart problems, such as mild atherosclerosis and myocardial fibrosis.

Eller's death came just two days before her scheduled performance at Praça do Ó in Barra da Tijuca, Rio de Janeiro, as part of the New Year's Eve celebrations. She was replaced by Luciana Mello. At several spots in Rio de Janeiro, there was a minute of silence during the festivities in memory of Eller. Several artists also paid homage to the singer at their shows at the turn of the year.

She is buried at the Jardim da Saudade Cemetery, in the Sulacap neighborhood of the city of Rio de Janeiro.

In December 2002 the posthumous album Dez de Dezembro was released, including unpublished tracks such as "No Recreio" and "All Star," the latter being about Eller's friendship with Nando Reis.

== Personal life ==
Cássia Eller was openly bisexual. In 1993, Eller gave birth to her first and only child, a son named Francisco (affectionately called Chicão), the love child of a casual relationship with a friend, bassist Tavinho Fialho. Tavinho was married and died in a car accident a week before Chicão was born. Chicão was raised by Eller and her partner Maria Eugênia Vieira Martins. The two had been in a relationship since 1987 and stayed together until Eller's death in 2001. Eller's request was that if something happened to her, Maria Eugênia would be responsible for the care of Francisco, and after her death her partner did raise the boy after a legal battle over his custody against Eller's father. Francisco also became a musician, best known by the stage name Chico Chico.

Eller was a passionate fan of Clube Atlético Mineiro, and was planned to receive the Silver Rooster, an honor given to illustrious fans of the club. However, with her untimely death, the trophy ended up being delivered in 2002 to her mother, Nanci Eller. Eller's mother, describing her love for the club, said: "Last year Cássia performed in Curitiba, and Levir Culpi sent a Rooster shirt for her and her son. All of her instruments have the Athletic shield. She always put the shield on the things she won. There is even a shield on the door of the studio that Eller had in her residence".

== Discography ==
Studio albums

- Cássia Eller (1990)
- O Marginal (1992)
- Cássia Eller (1994)
- Veneno AntiMonotonia (1997)
- Com Você... Meu Mundo Ficaria Completo (1999)
- Dez de Dezembro (2002)
- Cássia Eller & Victor Biglione in blues (2022)

Live albums

- Cássia Eller ao Vivo (1996)
- Veneno Vivo (1998)
- Cássia Rock Eller (2000)
- Acústico MTV – Cássia Eller (2001)
- Rock in Rio: Cássia Eller Ao Vivo (2006)
