= Nando Reis =

Brazilian musician (born 1963)

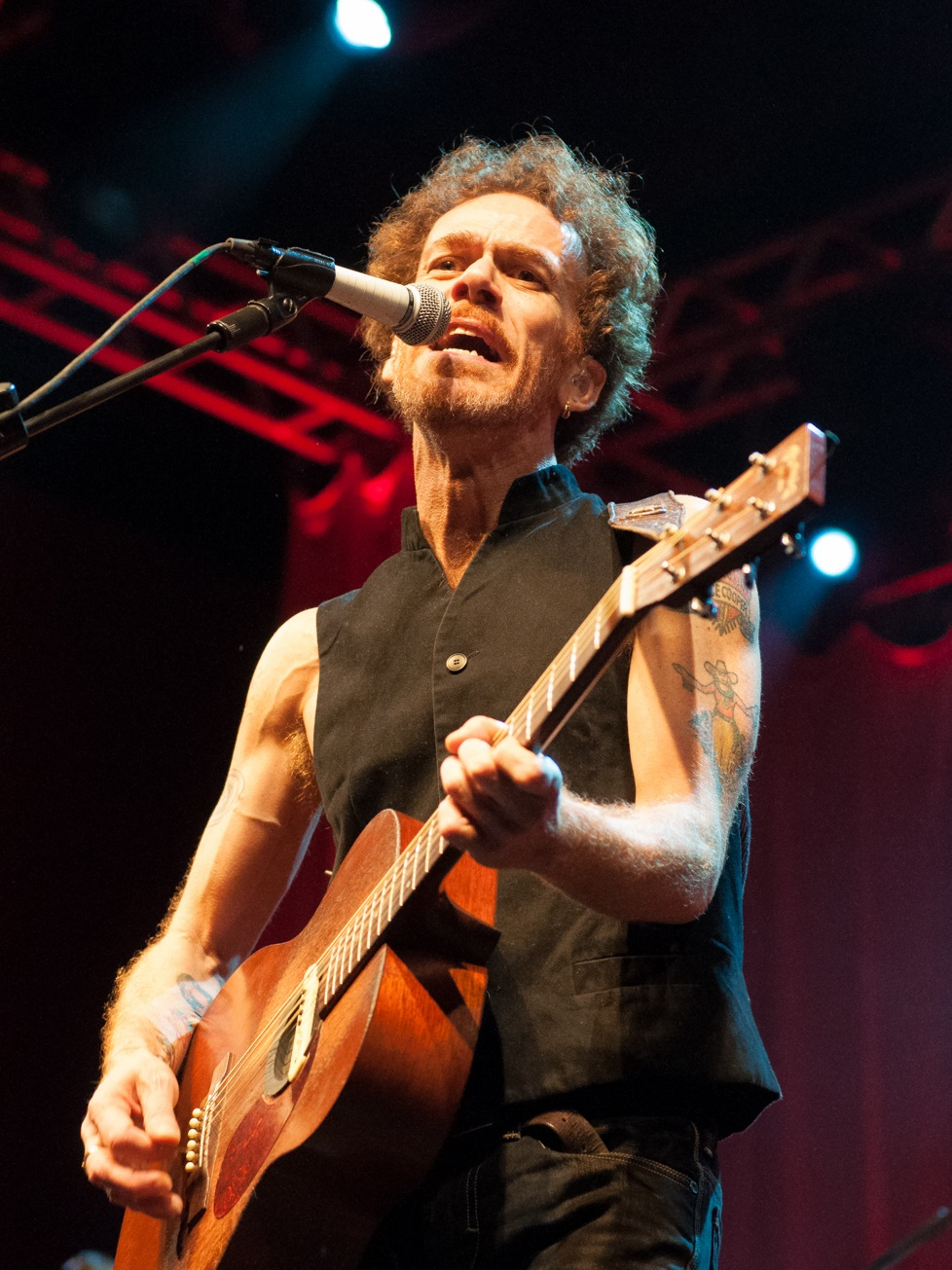
- Reis performing in 2014

Background information
- Born: José Fernando Gomes dos Reis; January 12, 1963 (age 63); São Paulo, Brazil
- Genres: Brazilian rock; MPB; alternative rock; pop rock; folk rock; post-punk
- Occupations: Musician; singer; songwriter; record producer
- Instruments: Vocals; bass guitar; acoustic guitar
- Years active: 1982–present
- Member of: Nando Reis & Os Infernais
- Formerly of: Os Camarões; Titãs
- Website: nandoreis.com.br

Nando Reis (Portuguese pronunciation: [ˈnɐ̃du ˈʁejs], born José Fernando Gomes dos Reis; January 12, 1963) is a Brazilian musician and producer, best known as the former bassist and one of the lead singers of Brazilian rock band Titãs and for his successful solo career, with his own band called Nando Reis & Os Infernais. He has also produced a few albums, including some related to Cássia Eller, who has made several significant partnerships with him, and Marisa Monte. In 2012, Nando Reis was listed among the top ten Brazilian artists at the ECAD list of artists who earned the most from copyright in the first semester of that year. In 2016, he was at the 15th position, besides being 6th in the ranking of earnings from live performances and topped the ranking of earnings from music played in public places.

== Childhood ==
Nando Reis was born in São Paulo to Cecília Leonel and José Carlos Galvão Gomes dos Reis. He was given his prename "José" just like his brothers, José Carlos, the oldest of the children, and José Luiz (who is deaf), the younger. His two sisters also shared the same prenames: Maria Cecília, the older, and Maria Luiza, the youngest of the five, who developed cerebral palsy.

His mother was an acoustic guitar teacher and his father was an engineer. José Carlos taught him a little bit of Rock 'n' Roll, showing him Rolling Stones's album Between the Buttons. Maria Cecília taught him to play the acoustic guitar and took him to a show of Gal Costa and Gilberto Gil.

He was given his first acoustic guitar by his grandmother, at the age of 7, and was taught his first chords by his sister. However, most of his skills were acquired alone, when he learned songs of Caetano Veloso all by himself. He also had lessons with Paulinho Nogueira, who also taught his mother.

Some friends of José Carlos played in a rock band. Once, he took Nando to a small performance at the garage of the bassist house. Impressed with the solos of the guitarist, he asked him to teach him, but he never made it. He also tried the drums, but gave up. He decided then to play the bass guitar, as his attempts to play the electric guitar and the drums failed. Other artists, such as the Beatles, Led Zeppelin and Alice Cooper kept joining his main influences. At the age of eleven, he had classes of classic guitar and harmony with Alexandre ("Maranhão"), a friend of José Carlos. His first compositions were all based on poems. Most of them were long, showing his appreciation for long songs.

In 1978, he entered Equipe School. There, he formed a band called "Os Camarões" (The Shrimps) with some friends, and managed to win a local music festival. When he met Paulo Miklos and Arnaldo Antunes, who took part of the festival, he made the first compositions with what would later become Titãs. When the high school was over, he made three attempts on the Mathematics yearly vestibular at University of São Paulo, but ended up studying at Federal University of São Carlos. The university occupied most of his time. Therefore, he decided to quit it in order to focus on the band. By then, he was also a percussionist and crooner in Sossega Leão, a salsa band.

== Career with Titãs ==
In 1982, Titãs (at that time "Titãs do Iê-Iê") made their first live presentation at Mário de Andrade Library with Reis as a drummer, an instrument he soon abandoned. They recorded several tapes and sent them to recording labels until they signed up with Warner Music label. In 1984, Titãs released their first album, Titãs, and Nando played the bass guitar in some tracks although initially he was supposed to be a backing vocalist only. After this release, he briefly left the band for two weeks in order to focus on Sossega Leão, which was making more money, but he changed his mind and was accepted back. In the late 1980s, Titãs caught a plane to London, for their first international show. On June 19, 1989, his mother Cecília died of cancer.

In the early 1990s, he started producing his first albums, with artists like Marisa Monte and Cássia Eller. In 1995, he recorded his first solo album, 12 de Janeiro. In 2000, Titãs changed to Abril Music, and after recording As Dez Mais in Seattle, Nando released his second solo album, Para Quando o Arco-Íris Encontrar o Pote de Ouro, with some special participations like Cássia Eller, Rogério Fausino (from Jota Quest) and Peter Buck (from REM).

In 2001, he was nominated for the Multishow Brazilian Music Award for "Best solo new artist", but lost to Wanessa Camargo.

On June 13, 2001, Titãs' guitarist Marcelo Fromer died after being rammed by a motorcycle (see Marcelo Fromer's Death). On December 29, he lost another friend: Cássia Eller. In 2002, he released Infernal, his third solo work. He then decided to leave Titãs on September 9, 2002, partially due to the impact both friends' deaths caused in his life, but mainly due to a "thought incompatibility". In a later interview, he said that he left the group also due to his will to give more attention to his solo works. He even proposed that the band stopped for one year after the album release. He also said that his isolation as a composer grew more evident in more recent albums, with more and more songs being composed just by him. Nowadays, Reis and Titãs are on good terms.

In 2001, he produced and guest performed in Eller's Acústico MTV album, which was later nominated for 2002 Latin Grammy Award for Best Brazilian Rock Album; and won it.

== Solo career ==
In 2003, he released his fourth album, A Letra A. He followed that up by releasing the successful MTV-produced live album MTV ao Vivo: Nando Reis & Os Infernais, and in early 2006, released another studio album, Sim e Não. This was followed by another MTV-produced live album Luau MTV: Nando Reis & Os Infernais. His next studio album, Drês, includes several personal songs: "Conta", a tribute to his mother, and "Só pra So", another tribute for his daughter Sophia, as well as "Pra Você Guardei o Amor", a duet with Ana Cañas. His cover version of "Eu Nasci Há Dez Mil Anos Atrás", a song by Raul Seixas, was featured in the Rede Globo's telenovela India – A Love Story soundtrack.

In 2011, "De Repente" (suddenly), a song co-written by him and Samuel Rosa, from Brazilian pop rock quartet Skank, was nominated for the 2011 Latin Grammy Award for Best Brazilian Song and won.

Reis spent most of 2012 in Seattle recording his seventh solo album, Sei, released in October. This time, he worked with producer Jack Endino, who had already produced four studio albums for Titãs.

On October 6, 2012, Nando performed live with his ex-band Titãs for the first time since his departure, in a venue in São Paulo. The special performance was a celebration of the 30th year of the band's career. Arnaldo Antunes and Charles Gavin, other ex-members, were also present at the concert. It was the first time since 2002 that he used his bass guitar.

Nando performed at Sunset Stage of Rock in Rio 5 on September 15, 2013, along with Samuel Rosa, guitarist and vocalist of Skank, whose then upcoming album Velocia would feature some songs co-written by Reis.

In 2014, Reis received his third Latin Grammy Award nomination, this time for Best Brazilian Rock Album, for his live album Sei Como Foi em BH. Also in 2014, he announced he would enter the studio in 2015 to start recording a new album. In February 2016, it was revealed that the album would feature guest performances of Reis' ex-colleagues from Titãs Paulo Miklos, Branco Mello, Sérgio Britto and Arnaldo Antunes (the latter also an ex-member of the band), besides singers Pitty, Luiza Possi and Tulipa Ruiz. Afterwards, it was announced that Peter Buck (ex-R.E.M.) and Mike McCready (Pearl Jam, Mad Season), as well as four children of Reis (Zoé, Sophia, Theo and Sebastião; the two latter form the duo 2Reis), would be featured in the album as well.

In the same month, it was announced that the singer, together with the band Os Paralamas do Sucesso and singers Paula Toller and Pitty, would take part of a tour promoted by the project Nivea Viva!, which takes place every year and takes artists on Brazilian tours. The series of seven shows will pay tribute to Brazilian rock. Later in that year it was announced that Reis would guest sing in some songs by American supergroup Levee Walkers, formed by Mike McCready, Duff McKagan (Guns N' Roses/Velvet Revolver) and Barrett Martin (Mad Season/Screaming Trees) – the latter having worked with reis in some of his albums.

In November 2016, he released his album Jardim-Pomar. The cover was drawn by artist Vânia Mignone. On September 16 of that year, he released the first single, "Só Posso Dizer".

In October 2018, he released the single "Rock 'n' Roll". Clocking at almost nine minutes, the song features Jack Endino on the guitar and discusses politics, society and the environment. On 18 September 2020, he released "Espera a Primavera" (Wait for Spring), featuring Endino, Lulu Santos, Walter Vilaça, Céu and his son Theo. The song alludes to a "multi-color love", which according to him is opposed to the "negationist, reductionist and obscurantist" speech that he believes is being put in practice by the Brazilian government.

In 2021, his EP Duda Beat & Nando Reis (with Duda Beat) and his song "Espera a Primavera" were nominated for the Latin Grammy Award for Best Portuguese Language Contemporary Pop Album and Best Portuguese Language Song, respectively.

Also in 2021, Reis released two re-recordings of previous hits of his career. On 11 June, he released a new version of "Um Tiro no Coração" (feat. Pitty), a song originally performed by Sandra de Sá and Cássia Eller. On 26 November, he released "Não Vou Me Adaptar", originally recorded by Titãs on the album Televisão (1985) and written by Arnaldo Antunes, who guest performs on the new version. Both songs were released in preparation for his Nando Hits tour, which started on 23 December in São Paulo.

In 2022, he released an album with the Orquestra Petrobras Sinfônica, conducted by Isaac Karabtchevsky, following a 2019 tour that saw them perform in six Brazilian state capitals.

== Personal life ==
Nando Reis has been married twice. His first marriage was to Vânia Passos, a former classmate, and the wedding took place on February 14, 1985. His four children are Theodoro Passos Reis, born on January 16, 1986, Sophia Passos Reis, born on July 1, 1988, Sebastião, born on May 13, 1995, and Zoe Passos Reis, born on September 27, 1999. In September 2003, he ended his marriage with Vânia, and married Anna a few months later. In November 2005, he ended his second marriage. He dated Nina, and she gave him his fifth child, Ismael. Some years later, he started dating Vânia again. He also dated fellow musician and occasional partner Marisa Monte.

His daughter Sophia Reis was a VJ for MTV Brasil. She has also worked as actress and starred in the film Meu Tio Matou um Cara. Theodoro Reis is also an artist and performs in the band Zafenate.

Nando Reis is a self-declared atheist and bisexual. He supports São Paulo FC, having written a book about his passion for football entitled Meu Pequeno São-Paulino (My Little São Paulo Supporter). He also had a column about sports at O Estado de S. Paulo newspaper.

Nando has a history of drug and alcohol use, which he has now quit. He states that he has contemplated suicide twice: once via a lexotan overdose (which led him to the hospital), and another time by jumping.

One of Nando's cousins is Vange Leonel, who was famous for her work with the post-punk band Nau. Nando would produce her debut full-length solo album, Vange, in 1991.

Reis owns a property in Jaú, São Paulo state, where he recovers the riparian forest and keeps bees and an agriforest.

== Discography ==
=== Solo studio albums ===
- (1994) 12 de Janeiro
- (2000) Para Quando o Arco-Íris Encontrar o Pote de Ouro
- (2001) Infernal
- (2003) A Letra A
- (2006) Sim e Não
- (2009) Drês
- (2012) Sei
- (2016) Jardim-Pomar
- (2019) Não Sou Nenhum Roberto, Mas às Vezes Chego Perto
- (2024) Uma Estrela Misteriosa Revelará o Segredo

=== Live/video solo albums ===
- (2004) MTV ao Vivo: Nando Reis & Os Infernais
- (2007) Luau MTV: Nando Reis & Os Infernais
- (2010) MTV ao Vivo: Nando Reis & Os Infernais - Bailão do Ruivão
- (2013) Sei Como Foi em BH

=== As a producer ===
- (1989) Ben Jor – Jorge Ben Jor
- (1991) Vange – Vange Leonel
- (1994) NOMAD – Nomad
- (1995) Maskavo Roots – Maskavo Roots
- (1999) Com Você... Meu Mundo Ficaria Completo – Cássia Eller
- (2001) Acústico MTV: Cássia Eller – Cássia Eller
- (2002) Dez de Dezembro – Cássia Eller (posthumous release)
- (2002) Squadra – Squadra

=== Guest appearances ===
Artist	Album	Songs	Instruments
Raimundos	Raimundos (1994)	"Puteiro em João Pessoa", "Selim"	Acoustic guitar and viola, respectively
Théo Werneck	Terceiro Mundo (1994)	"Lovely Rita"	Acoustic guitar, bass and backing vocals
Marisa Monte	Verde, Anil, Amarelo, Cor-de-Rosa e Carvão (1994)	"Maria de Verdade", "Na Estrada", "Ao meu redor", "Enquanto Isso" and "Segue o Seco"	Acoustic guitar, electric guitar and lead vocals ("Segue o Seco" only)
Cássia Eller	Acústico MTV: Cássia Eller (2001)	"Relicário"	Acoustic guitar and lead vocals
Os Paralamas do Sucesso	Uns Dias ao Vivo (2004)	"Tendo a Lua"	Lead vocals
Arnaldo Antunes	Ao Vivo no Estúdio (2007)	"Não Vou Me Adaptar"	Acoustic guitar and lead vocals

== Bibliography ==
- Meu Pequeno São Paulino (2009), Belas Letras
