= Alex Veley =

American rock musician (born 1973)

- Born: June 11, 1973 (age 52); Eugene, Oregon, U.S.
- Origin: Seattle, Washington
- Genres: Soul, rock, blues, funk
- Occupations: Keyboardist, singer
- Years active: 1990s–present
- Formerly of: Maktub; Source of Labor; Tuatara; Minus 5 Nando Reis e os Infernais

Alex Veley is an American rock musician, soul keyboardist and singer.

== Biography ==
He was a founding member of Seattle-based neo-soul band Maktub in the 1990s with lead singer Reggie Watts and co-produced the band's debut album, 2000's Subtle Ways which won "Best R&B album" that year at the Northwest Music Awards. He later went on to tour and perform with other Seattle groups like Tuatara, The Minus 5, and record with solo artists like Arkansas Delta Blues guitarist CeDell Davis and singer-songwriter Dave Matthews, playing Hammond organ on Matthews' grammy-award-winning solo album, "Some Devil."

In 2003, he moved to Rio de Janeiro, Brazil, where he currently records and performs with artists such as Nando Reis (as part of his band Os Infernais), Erasmo Carlos, and many others.

Veley released a jazz-funk solo album in 2003 entitled Maconha Baiana, recorded both in Rio de Janeiro and Seattle, Washington. He is known for using classic keyboards like the Hammond organ, Fender Rhodes electric piano, and Hohner Clavinet.

== Discography ==
=== United States ===
- 1996: Sharkskin "Kiran's Dance" (Sweet Mother Recordings)
- 1997: Source of Labor Word Sound Power (Jasiri Media Group)
- 1997: Source of Labor "Overstandings" (Jasiri Media Group)
- 1999: Maktub Subtle Ways (Jasiri Media Group)
- 2001: Source of Labor Stolen Lives (Sub Verse Music)
- 2001: Wayward Shamans Alchemy (Fast Horse Recordings)
- 2002: Tuatara Cinemathique (Fast Horse Recordings)
- 2002: CeDell Davis When Lightnin' Hit the Pine (Fast Horse Recordings)
- 2003: Dave Matthews Some Devil (RCA)
- 2003: Jude Bowerman Life Goes On (Yellow Tone)
- 2003: Mackrosoft 1st Mack To The Moon (Mackrosoft Records)
- 2003: Mackrosoft Journey To Vaginus (Mackrosoft Records)
- 2003: Mackrosoft Life Imitates Clouds (Mackrosoft Records)
- 2005: Bola Abimbola Ara Kenge (Fast Horse Recordings)
- 2005: Mackrosoft The Dawning Of The Aja Aquarius (Mackrosoft Records)
- 2005: Aja West & Cheeba Flash & Snowball (Mackrosoft Records)
- 2006: Mackrosoft Antonio's Giraffe (Mackrosoft Records)
- 2011: Veley Brothers "The Way You Make Me Smile"
- 2016: CeDell Davis Even The Devil Gets The Blues (Sunyata Records)

=== Brazil ===
- 2000: Nando Reis Para Quando o Arco-Íris Encontrar o Pote de Ouro (Warner)
- 2001: Nando Reis Infernal (Warner)
- 2001: Nando Reis Dê Uma Chance Á Paz, John Lennon, Uma Homenagem - "Mind Games" (Geléia Geral)
- 2003: Nando Reis A Letra A (Universal)
- 2003: Mylene _mylene (Fast Horse Recordings)
- 2003: Nando Reis Assim Assado - Tributo ao Secos e Molhados - "Sangue Latino" (Deckdisc)
- 2005: Nando Reis Um Barzinho, Um Violão - Jovem Guarda - "Você Pediu e Eu Já Vou Daqui" (Universal)
- 2005: Nando Reis e os Infernais MTV Ao Vivo – Nando Reis e Os Infernais (MTV – Universal)
- 2006: Pepê Barcellos Chega De Falar De Amor
- 2006: O Salto A Noite É Dos Que Não Dormem
- 2006: Nando Reis e os Infernais Sim e Não (Universal)
- 2007: Nando Reis e os Infernais Luau MTV – Nando Reis e Os Infernais (MTV – Universal)
- 2007: George Israel Distorções do Meu Jardim (Som Livre)
- 2007: Sérgio Loroza MPB - Música Brasileira de Pista (Zambo Discos)
- 2009: Nando Reis e os Infernais Drês (Universal)
- 2009: Erasmo Carlos Rock 'n' Roll (Coqueiro Verde)
- 2009: Nando Reis "Eu Nasci Há Dez Mil Anos Atrás" Caminho das Índias - soundtrack
- 2010: Nando Reis e os Infernais Bailão do Ruivão (MTV – Universal)
- 2010: Nando Reis e os Infernais Soberano - Seis Vezes São Paulo - original soundtrack
- 2010: Ana Cañas Hein? - bonus track: "Luz Antiga" (Sony)
- 2010: Zafenate Zafenate (Universal)
- 2010: Carlos Pontual Inventa Qualquer Coisa
- 2010: Kid Abelha "Veio do Tempo" - unreleased studio version
- 2011: Erasmo Carlos Sexo (Coqueiro Verde)
- 2011: Cássia Eller Relicário (Universal)
- 2012: Nando Reis e os Infernais Sei
- 2013: TAI Seda e Pedra
- 2013: Dois Reis "Família" Malhação Casa Cheia - soundtrack
- 2013: Nando Reis e os Infernais Sei Como Foi em BH (Coqueiro Verde)
- 2013: Mario Broder Balanço Diferente
- 2013: Alex Veley Trio Rock 'n' Soul
- 2014: Negra Li "Negra Livre" Você Vai Estar Na Minha: Duetos
- 2014: Lucio Kropf O Baú Musical de Lucio Kropf e os Agregados do Rock and Roll
- 2015: Lucio Kropf Pela Rua
- 2016: Nando Reis Jardim - Pomar (Relicário)
- 2017: Nando Reis Turnê Jardim Pomar ao vivo, #1 - live album
- 2017: Nando Reis Turnê Jardim Pomar ao vivo, #2 - live album
- 2017: Nando Reis Turnê Jardim Pomar ao vivo, #3 - live album
- 2017: Nando Reis Turnê Jardim Pomar ao vivo, #4 - live album
- 2017: Nando Reis Turnê Jardim Pomar ao vivo, #5 - live album
- 2017: Nando Reis Turnê Jardim Pomar ao vivo, #6 - live album
- 2017: Nando Reis Turnê Jardim Pomar ao vivo, #7 - live album
- 2017: Nando Reis Turnê Jardim Pomar ao vivo, #8 - live album
- 2017: Trinca de Asas "Tocarte"
- 2017: McGee and the Lost Hope "Magick Beings" (Abraxas Records)
- 2018: Nando Reis "Rock 'n' Roll" (Relicário)
- 2018: Blame The Guitar Man, featuring Alex Veley The Human
- 2018: Bellini "Ela"
- 2018: Nando Reis Não Sou Nenhum Roberto Mas as Vezes Chego Perto (Relicário)
- 2019: Blame The Guitar Man, featuring Mario Broder Mundo Melhor
- 2019: Blame The Guitar Man, featuring Julia Cascon Madrugada
- 2019: Nando Reis "Como Vai Você" (Relicário)
- 2019: Nando Reis & Melim "Onde Você Mora?" (Relicário)
- 2020: Nando Reis "Espera a Primavera" (Relicário)
- 2020: Nando Reis & Ana Vilela "Laços" (Musickeria)
- 2021: Nando Reis & Pitty "Um Tiro no Coração" (Relicário)
- 2021: Various Artists "Canção Pra Amazônia" (Greenpeace)
- 2021: Malouka, feat. Alex Veley "Space Cake" (Veley Records)
- 2021: Nando Reis & Arnaldo Antunes "Não Vou Me Adaptar" (Relicário)
- 2021: Folks "Mentalize (Vem Coisa Boa)" (Toca Discos)
- 2022: Nando Reis & Jão "Sim" (Relicário)
- 2022: Nando Reis & Elana Dara "Hey, Babe!" (Relicário / Warner)
- 2022: Various Artists Cassia Reggae, vol. 1 (Universal)
- 2022: PittyNando As Suas, As Minhas e As Nossas (Deckdisc)
- 2022: Nando Reis & Colomy "Pra Você Guardei o Amor" (Relicário)
- 2023: Nando Reis & Jade Baraldo "A Fila" (Relicário)
- 2023: Pedro Quental "Vamos nos Amar Então"
- 2024: Nando Reis Uma Estrela Misteriosa Revelará o Segredo (Relicário)

=== Solo material ===
- 2003: Alex Veley Maconha Baiana

=== DVDs ===
- 2005: Nando Reis e os Infernais MTV Ao Vivo - Nando Reis e Os Infernais (MTV - Universal)
- 2005: Nando Reis Um Barzinho, um Violão - Jovem Guarda - "Você Pediu e Eu Já Vou Daqui" (Universal Music)
- 2007: Nando Reis e os Infernais Luau MTV - Nando Reis e Os Infernais (MTV - Universal)
- 2007: Nando Reis e Cachorro Grande Estúdio Coca-Cola - Nando Reis e Cachorro Grande (MTV - Brasil)
- 2010: Nando Reis e os Infernais Bailão do Ruivão (MTV - Universal)
- 2013: Nando Reis e os Infernais Sei Como Foi em BH
- 2023: PittyNando As Suas, As Minhas, e As Nossas
