= Church and Monastery of Our Lady of Grace =

Church in Salvador, Bahia, Brazil

- Igreja e Mosteiro de Nossa Senhora da Graça
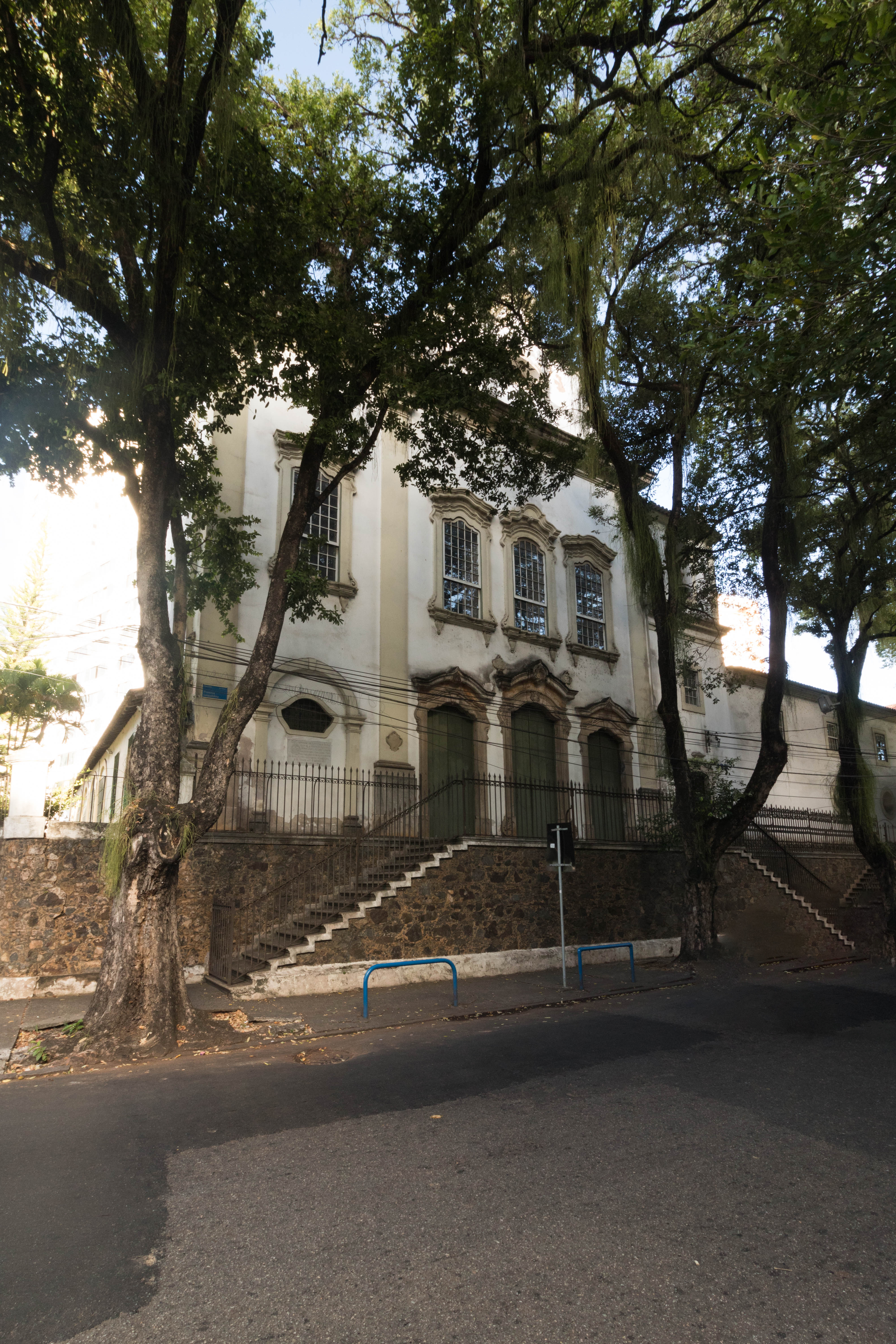
- Church and Monastery of Our Lady of Grace

- Location of the Church and Monastery of Our Lady of Grace in Brazil

Religion
- Affiliation: Catholic
- Rite: Roman
- Ownership: Roman Catholic Archdiocese of São Salvador da Bahia

Location
- Municipality: Salvador
- State: Bahia
- Country: Brazil
- Interactive map of Church and Monastery of Our Lady of Grace
- Coordinates: 12.999559°S 38.523574°W

Architecture
- Established: 1600s

National Historic Heritage of Brazil
- Designated: 1938

The Church and Monastery of Our Lady of Grace (Portuguese: Igreja e Mosteiro de Nossa Senhora da Graça, or Igreja e Abadia de Nossa Senhora da Graça) is an 18th-century Roman Catholic church located in Salvador, Bahia, Brazil. The church is dedicated to Our Lady of Grace and is part of the Roman Catholic Archdiocese of São Salvador da Bahia; it is owned and managed by the Mosteiro de São Bento. It was listed as a historic structure by the National Historic and Artistic Heritage Institute (IPHAN) in 1938.

== Location ==
The Church and Monastery of Grace is located in the Graça neighborhood on a hill south of the Historic Center of Salvador, high above the Bay of All Saints.

== History ==
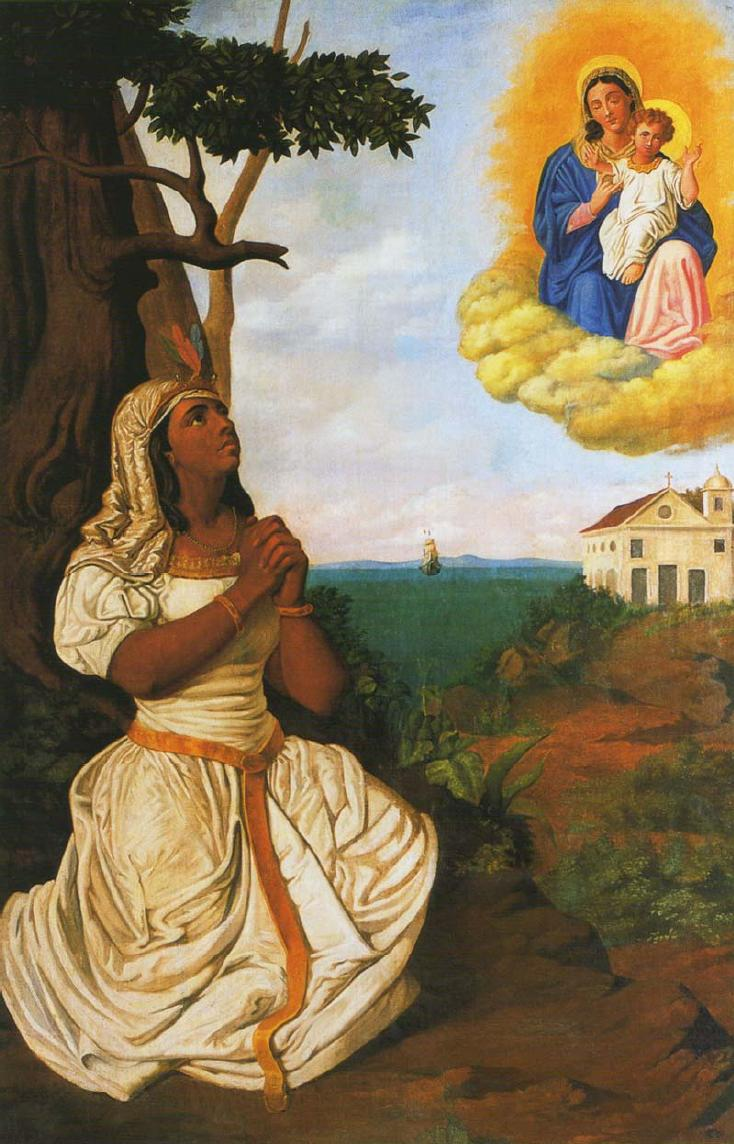
O Sonho de Catarina Paraguaçu by Manuel Lopes Rodrigues (1860–1917)

The Church and Monastery of Grace is built on the site of a chapel built in 1535 of 1536 and dedicated to Catarina Paraguaçu, the wife of Diogo Álvares (c. 1475-1557), the castaway better known as Caramuru. Catarina Paraguassú traveled to Europe and was baptized in France in 1528. She had Marian visions after her baptism in France and returned to Brazil to construct a simple chapel dedicated to Our Lady of Grace. She donated the chapel to the Benedictines on July 16, 1586. The Benedictines built an abbey adjacent to the chapel, known as the Abadia de Graça. Despite its present urban location, the chapel was located far from the city center of Salvador. Catarina Paraguassú is interred at the church. The Church and Monastery of Grace, along with the demolished Se Cathedral and the Church of Victoria, are the earliest churches in Bahia.

The Graça College (Colégio da Graça) was designed by Friar Gregório de Magalhães in 1645 and built between 1680 and 1717. The church has a tower with a bulb in the shape an orange, likely a remnant of Mozarabic architecture. The college was promoted to the status of monastery in 1694.

The original chapel of the monastery fell into complete ruin during the 18th century. It was significantly altered or rebuilt in 1770. The Abbot Inácio da Piedade Pinto added a baroque façade, enlarged the nave, added two lateral altars, and added gilding to the ceiling of the church. José Teófilo de Jesus painted the ceiling of the nave. In addition, Piedade Pinto renovated and restored the monastery, retaining only the tower with its orange-shaped dome. The painting of the nave's ceiling was altered in 1881 by Manuel Lopes Rodrigues. Part of the left arch was closed in 1924 for the construction of the Santa Teresa Chapel.

== Structure ==
The Church and Monastery of Grace consists of a church with a single nave and a two-story monastery around a cloister. The church has an upper choir, tribunes, chancel, and a sacristy. The sacristy is located to one side with three entrance doors. The church has three altars; the central is dedicated to Our Lady of Grace, the right to Saint Joseph, and the left to the Sacred Heart of Jesus. The image of Our Lady of Grace dates to the 17th century, and altered during a restoration in the 1930s. The church also has images of Saint Scholastica and Saint Benedict of Nursia.

Manuel Lopes Rodrigues (1860–1917) completed several paintings in the church in the late 19th century depicting Catarina Paraguassú and Caramuru. They include the ceiling paintings of the chancel and nave ceiling. Rodrigues also completed the painting O Sonho de Paraguassu in 1881.

== Protected status ==
The Church and Monastery of Our Lady of Grace was listed as a historic structure by the National Institute of Historic and Artistic Heritage (IPHAN) in 1938. Both the structure and its contents were included in the IPHAN directive under inscription number 79.

== Access ==
The church is closed for renovation and may not be visited.
