= Catarina Paraguaçu =

Tupinambá convert to Christianity and visionary

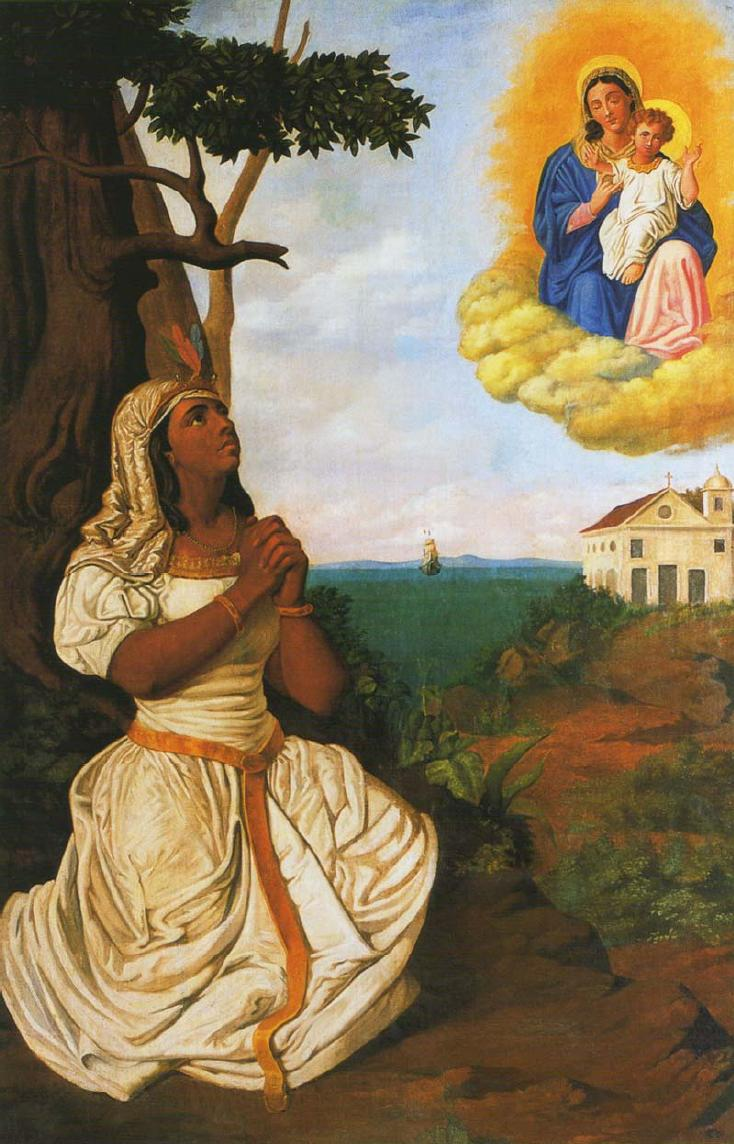
- Catarina Paraguaçu's Dream, an 1871 painting by Manuel Lopes Rodrigues
- Born: Guaibimpará; 16th century Bahia, Colonial Brazil, Kingdom of Portugal
- Died: 1586; Colonial Brazil, Kingdom of Portugal
- Known for: Marian visionary through dreams
- Spouse: Diogo Correia
- Children: Gaspar; Gabriel; Jorge

Catarina Álvares Paraguaçu, also known as Catarina do Brasil (baptized June 1528 – 1586), was a Tupinambá Indigenous woman. She was born in what is today the state of Bahia (dates unknown) and was married to Portuguese sailor Diogo Álvares Correia, also known as "Caramuru". She and Caramuru became the first Brazilian Christian family.

Her father, the cacique of the Tupinambás, offered her as a wife to Correia, since he was a prominent figure among the Indians. Correia traveled to France in 1526, taking his wife with him, and in 1528, in Saint-Malo, Catarina was baptized, receiving the name Catarina do Brasil (French: Catherine du Brésil; English: Catherine of Brazil).

== Death and legacy ==
Paraguaçu died in 1586, and, as per her last will and testament, her possessions were all donated to the Benedictine monks. She is buried at the Church of Our Lady of Grace (Igreja da Graça), in Salvador, Bahia.

== Dreams ==
A legend says that Catarina dreamed constantly about castaways dying of cold and hunger. In one of those dreams, she saw a woman carrying a baby in her arms. Trusting in the mystic qualities of her dreams, Caramuru told the people to search everywhere around the shores. Many castaways were found, but no woman among them.

Days later, Catarina dreamed again of the same woman, who told her to build a house for her in her village. Soon after, a statue of the Virgin Mary carrying Child Jesus was found.

The statue can now be found at the altar of the Igreja da Graça.

== In popular culture ==
- Paraguaçu appears in Santa Rita Durão's 1781 epic poem Caramuru, based on Diogo Correia's life. She is depicted as a seer, able to foresee the Dutch invasions of Brazil.
- Paraguaçu was portrayed by Camila Pitanga in the 2001 film Caramuru: A Invenção do Brasil, a loose, comedic adaptation of Durão's poem.
