= O Invasor =

- Directed by: Beto Brant
- Screenplay by: Marçal Aquino; Beto Brant; Renato Ciasca
- Starring: Marco Ricca; Alexandre Borges; Mariana Ximenes; Paulo Miklos; Malu Mader
- Cinematography: Toca Seabra
- Edited by: Manga Campion
- Distributed by: Pandora Filmes; Europa Filmes
- Release date: April 5, 2002 (Brazil)
- Running time: 97 minutes
- Country: Brazil
- Language: Portuguese

O Invasor (English: The Trespasser) is a 2002 Brazilian drama film directed by Beto Brant. It is an adaptation of the book of the same name, written by Marçal Aquino.

== Cast ==
- Marco Ricca as Ivan Soares
- Alexandre Borges as Gilberto
- Mariana Ximenes as Marina
- Paulo Miklos as Anísio
- Malu Mader as Cláudia
- George Freire as Estevão
- Chris Couto as Cecília
- Sabotage as himself

== Awards ==
2001: Festival de Brasília

1. Best Director (won)
2. Best Score (won)
3. Best Film (won; Critics Award)

2002: Bogota Film Festival

1. Best Film (Nominee)

2002: Havana Film Festival

1. Grand Coral - Third Prize (won)

== Remake ==
A French remake entitled Persona Non Grata (2019 film) was released in 2019. The film was directed by Roschdy Zem, co-written by Zem and Olivier Gorce and stars Nicolas Duvauchelle, Raphaël Personnaz, Anne Charrier and Roschdy Zem among others.
