= Vera Cruz, Bahia =

Vera Cruz (Bahia)
- Municipality
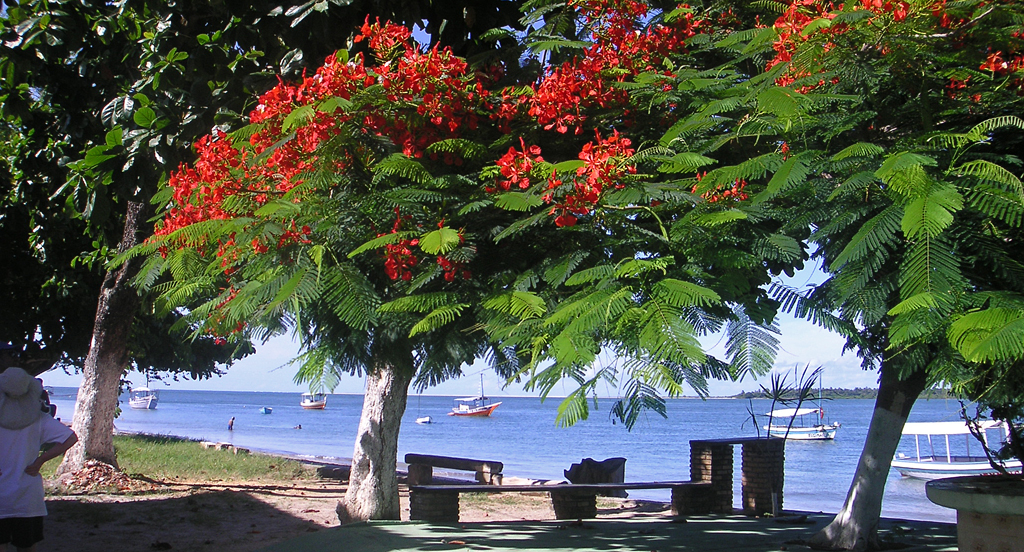

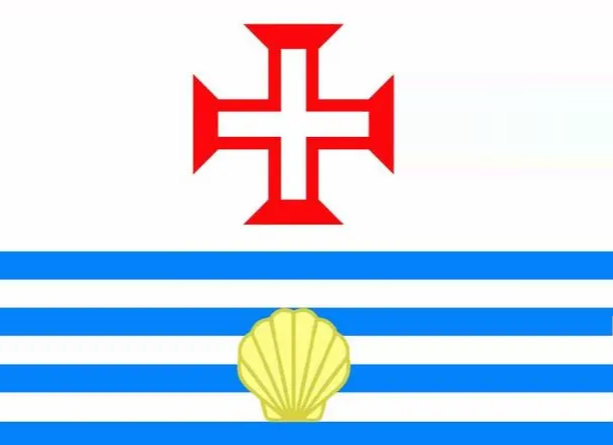
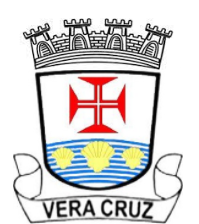
- Flag Coat of arms

- Location in the state of Bahia and Brazil
- Coordinates: 12°57′36″S 38°36′32″W
- Country: Brazil
- Region: Nordeste
- State: Bahia

Government
  - Mayor: Marcus Vinicius Marques Gil

Area
  - Total: 114.880 sq mi (297.537 km^{2})

Population (2020)
  - Total: 43,716
  - Density: 324.6/sq mi (125.33/km^{2})
- Time zone: UTC−3 (BRT)

Vera Cruz (Bahia) is a municipality in the state of Bahia in the North-East region of Brazil. It occupies 87% of the island of Itaparica; the remainder belongs to the municipality of Itaparica. The municipality of Vera Cruz has a population of is 43,716 (2020 estimate) and covers an area of 297.537 square kilometres (114.880 mi^{2}).

The municipality is located 5.5 kilometres (3.4 mi) opposite of Salvador across the Bay of All Saints.

== History ==
The island of Itaparica was home to a large population of Tupinambá peoples prior to the arrival of the Portugues. Diogo Álvaro Corrêa (c. 1475-1557), a Portuguese navigator also known as Caramuru, arrived on Itaparica in 1510. He met Catarina Paraguaçu (died 1586), daughter of the Tupinambá chief Taparica, and married her. Catarina travelled with Caramuru to France in 1526, was baptized in 1528, and is noted for her Marian visions.

Portuguese settlements in Vera Cruz were established soon after the arrival of Tomé de Sousa, Brazil's first governor-general, in 1549. The Jesuits founded a small settlement in present-day Baiacu in 1560. It was called the Vila do Senhor da Vera Cruz, and featured Brazil's first hydraulic works, a dam to provide drinking water. The ruins of the Jesuit church remain on the site. Sugarcane, wheat, and cattle were introduced to the area in the same period. The wealth of the island led to attacks by English corsairs by 1597. It was invaded by the Dutch between the years 1600 and 1647.

The Island of Itaparica was administered as part of Salvador until 1833. It was elevated to city status in 1962, and subsequently divided into two municipalities: Vera Cruz and Itaparica.

== Historic structures ==
Vera Cruz his home to numerous colonial-era structures, many dating to the 16th century. All lack federal, state, or municipal protection, with the exception of the Chapel of Saint Antony of Velásquez.

- Chapel of Our Lady of Penha
- Chapel of Saint Antony of Velásquez
- Parish Church of Santo Amaro
- Church of Nosso Senhor da Vera Cruz
- Church of Our Lady of the Conception
- Mercês Windmill

== See also ==
- List of municipalities in Bahia
