= Nita Costa =

Brazilian politician and philanthropist

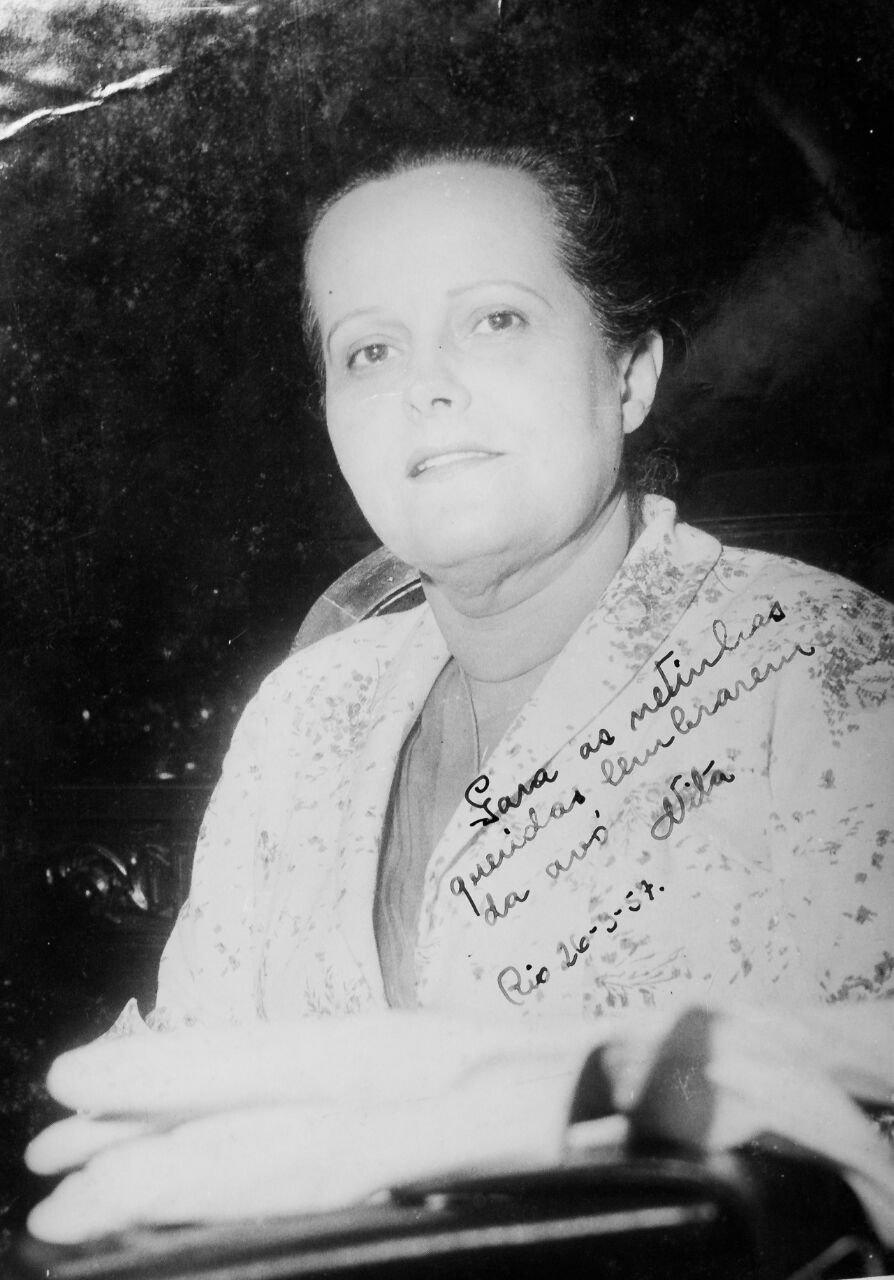

Federal Deputy from Bahia
- In office 1955–1959

Personal details
- Born: 7 November 1907 Feira de Santana, Bahia, Brazil
- Died: 7 March 1963 (aged 55) Novo Hamburgo, Rio Grande do Sul, Brazil
- Party: PTB
- Profession: Philanthropist

Leolina Barbosa de Souza Costa (7 November 1907 – 7 March 1963), better known as Nita Costa, was a Brazilian politician and philanthropist.

== Biography ==
The daughter of Deoclécio Barbosa de Sousa and Maria Machado Barbosa de Sousa, Costa lived in Salvador, where she married at age 17, had 2 daughters with businessman Leonardo Costa, and started to develop important assistance work in the health area, alongside the doctor. Alfredo Ferreira de Magalhães (1873–1943). The latter, in 1903, had created the Institute for the Protection and Assistance to Children of Bahia, to assist needy women and children. After the doctor's death, Costa succeeded him as head of the institute. Later, she undertook, raising donations from local merchants and industrialists, the construction of the Alfredo Magalhães Children's Hospital, in the Rio Vermelho neighborhood.

At the request of the Bahia state government, Costa assigned a wing of the hospital to the government, for the construction of a maternity hospital, which was named after her. She was also the founder of the PTB in Bahia, the party for which she was elected federal deputy, becoming the first federal deputy for the state in 1954. As a deputy (1955–1959), she was active in the defense of women's civil rights. Her term was marked by the presentation of Bill No. 3,915 of 1958, which regulated the civil rights of married women, proposing changes to Articles 233, 329, 330, 380 and 393 of Decree Law No. 4,657 of September 1942, which defined the man as the head of the family. Nita's project, by proposing a change in the structure of power in the family, brought to light one of the most advanced demands of feminism at the time, which would only be met in the 1988 Constitution. In her four years in office, Costa presented other projects related to the application of resources in the sectors of social assistance, health and culture. In 1958, she tried to be reelected federal deputy by the PTB but was unsuccessful.
