= Jurailton Santos =

Brazilian politician (born 1966)

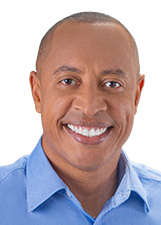
- Jurailton Santos
- Constituency: Bahia

Member of the Chamber of Deputies
- In office 1 February 2019 – present

Personal details
- Born: 27 August 1975 (age 51) Vera Cruz, Bahia
- Party: REP (since 2019)
- Other political affiliations: PRB (2019)
- Profession: politician

Jurailton de Sousa Santos (born 27 August 1975 in Vera Cruz, Bahia), better known as Jurailton Santos, is a Brazilian politician of the Republican party.

He is currently serving his second term as a state representative for the state of Bahia for the Republicans since February 1, 2019. In 2022, he was re-elected for a second term with 80,601 votes.
