= Marçal Aquino =

Brazilian writer (born 1958)

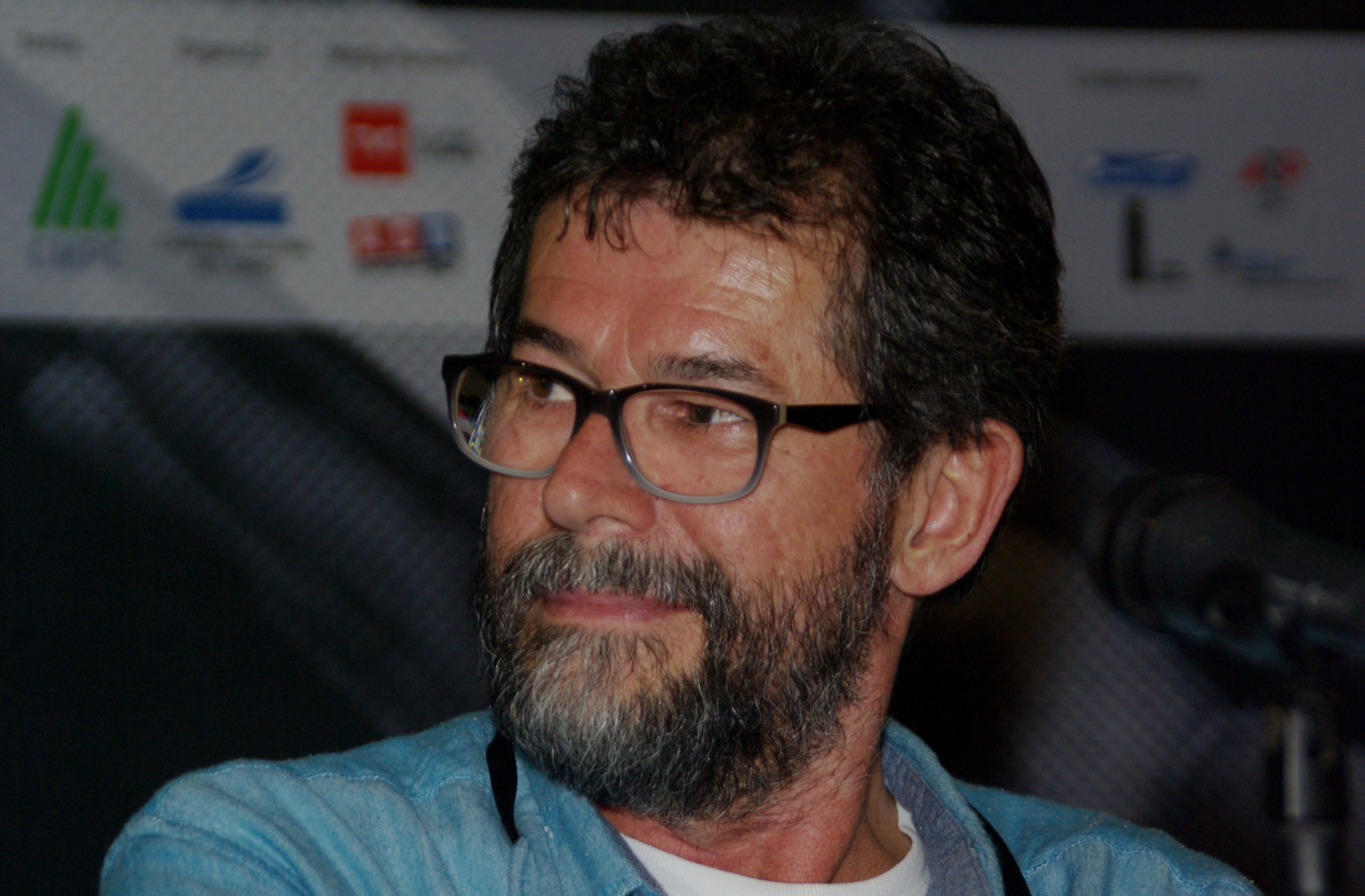
Aquino at the Santiago International Book Fair 2015

Marçal Aquino (born 1958) is a Brazilian novelist, screenwriter and journalist.

== Biography ==
He spent his childhood in Amparo, a city the countryside of São Paulo, graduating in journalism from the Pontifical Catholic University of Campinas (PUC / Campinas) in 1983. In 1984, he published his first book of poems, A depilação da noiva no dia do casamento. After moving to the city of São Paulo, he began working as a journalist for media like Gazeta Esportiva and O Estado de S. Paulo. Since 1988, working as a police reporter at the Jornal da Tarde, a fact that would influence his later work.

He released his first book of short stories, As fomes de setembro (The Famines of September) in 1991 to get the fifth Biennial Nestlé Prize in Literature. In 1994, Aquino wrote the script for Os Matadores (The Killers), a film directed by Beto Brant. In 2001, he was awarded the Jabuti Prize for the work O amor e outros objetos pontiagudos (Love and Other Sharp Objects). In 2002 he published the novel O Invasor (The Invader), and the screenplay for the eponymous film, also directed by Brant. In 2005, he published the novel Eu receberia as piores notícias dos seus lindos lábios (I Would Receive the Worst News from Your Beautiful Lips), again turned into a film by the same director, in 2012.

== Works ==
Prose

- O Invasor (2002, rereleased in 2011)
- Faroestes
- O Amor e Outros Objetos Pontiagudos (Prêmio Jabuti 2000)
- As Fomes de Setembro (Prêmio V Bienal Nestlé de Literatura – Conto (1991)
- Miss Danúbio (Prêmio do Concurso de Contos do Paraná)
- Cabeça a Prêmio (2003)
- Famílias Terrivelmente Felizes (2003)
- Eu Receberia as Piores Notícias dos seus Lindos Lábios (2005)
- Baixo esplendor (2021)

Poetry

- Abismos – Modo de Usar
- Por Bares Nunca Antes Naufragados

Youth literature

- O Mistério da Cidade-Fantasma
- O Jogo do Camaleão
- O Primeiro Amor e Outros Perigos
- A Turma da Rua Quinze
- Coleção Sete Faces

TV screenwriting

- O Caçador
- Força-Tarefa

Film screenwriting

- Os Matadores
- Ação entre Amigos
- O Invasor
- Nina
- Drained
- I'd Receive the Worst News from Your Beautiful Lips
