= Gonzalo Guerrero =

Spanish explorer (died c. 1536)

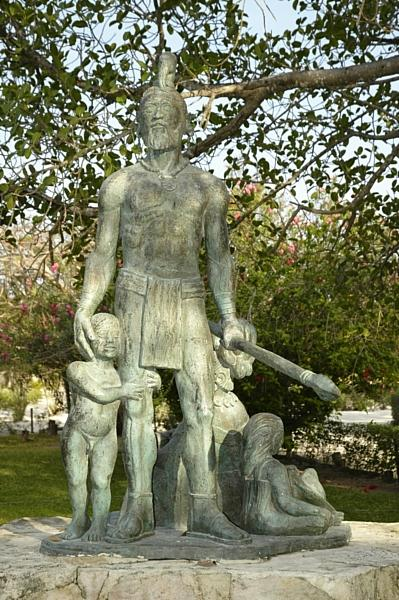
- Bronze sculpture of Gonzalo Guerrero and family / 1974 untitled work by Raúl Ayala Arellano installed January 1975 in Akumal, Q. Roo, Mex. / 2005 photograph
- Born: late 15th cent. Palos de la Frontera, Spain
- Died: c. 1536; Sula Valley, Honduras
- Spouse: Zazil Ha (c. 1510s)
- Children: 3 unnamed
- Military career
- Allegiance: Spain / to 1513; Chetumal / from 1514
- Rank: Nakom
- Conflicts: 1517 Hernández entrada; 1518 Grijalva entrada; 1527–1528 Montejo entrada; 1531–1533 Davila entrada; 1536 Alvarado entrada
- Memorials: vars

Gonzalo Guerrero (Castilian: [ɡõnθalo ɣereɾo], Mexican: [ɡõnsalo ɣereɾo]) (also known as Gonzalo Marinero, Gonzalo de Aroca and Gonzalo de Aroza) was a sailor from Palos, Spain, who was shipwrecked along the Yucatán Peninsula and was taken as a slave by the local Maya. Earning his freedom, Guerrero became a respected warrior under a Mayan lord and raised three of the first mestizo children in Mexico and one of the first mestizo children in the Americas, alongside Miguel Díez de Aux and the children of Caramuru and João Ramalho in Brazil.

== Early life ==
Little is known of Guerrero's early life. He is presumed to have reached the New World aboard a Spanish expedition in the late 15th or early 16th century. (Note: It has been suggested that Guerrero was born, raised, and trained as a sailor in Palos, and that he reached the New World around 1509 during his early twenties (Calder 2017, pp. 23, 39).)

== Career ==
=== Shipwreck and enslavement 1511 ===
In 1511, the Spanish caravel Santa María de la Barca carrying Guerrero and 20-30 passengers ran into a strong tropical storm and were shipwrecked in the open seas between Yucatán Peninsula and Cuba. Lacking a seaworthy vessel and provisions, the survivors boarded the rowing skiffs and drifted for thirteen days across open sea until sighting the eastern Yucatán coast, though by this point, only ten of the survivors remained alive. (Note: Guerrero's caravel was part of a fleet en route from Panama to Santo Domingo, belonging to Diego de Nicuesa, governor of colonial Panama (González Hernández 2018, para. 3). Chamberlain 1948, p. 15 cites a reef as the reason for the vessel's shipwreck. Calder 2017, pp. 64–65 dates Guerrero's shipwreck and landing to 1512.)

Guerrero and his nine surviving crew-mates were immediately apprehended by the Mayan militia of Waymil upon their landing. Some were ritually sacrificed, and the survivors were forced into slavery under various provincial aristocrats. (Note: Sailors who were not initially sacrificed are thought to have been detained in cages, whereupon some managed to escape, but these were nonetheless shortly re-captured by the Waymil militia (Díaz del Castillo 1963, pp. 60–65).)

=== Transfer to Chetumal 1514 ===
In circa 1514, Guerrero entered the service of Nachan Can, halach uinich or governor of Chetumal, while Gerónimo de Aguilar, his crew-mate, remained a slave of the batab or mayor of Xamanha. While in Chetumal, Guerrero is thought to have demonstrated superior military prowess, thereby earning military rank as nakom or commanding officer. He is thought to have served Chetumal or their allies during the 1517 Hernández de Córdoba and 1518 Juan de Grijalva entradas. Furthermore, during his time in Chetumal, Guerrero fully assimilated to Mayan culture, going so far as to convert to Mayan polytheism and to marry a Mayan woman, believed to have been the provincial governor's daughter. Guerrero and his wife's children are considered among the first mestizos in the New World, along with the children of Caramuru, in Bahia, and João Ramalho, in São Paulo, who were born between 1510 and 1520 in Brazil. (Note: By the first quarter of 1519, of the ten sailors who had landed in Yucatan and had not been ritually sacrificed in 1511, only Guerrero and Aguilar are thought to have remained alive (Chamberlain 1948, p. 15, González Hernández 2018, para. 4).)

=== Contact with Cortés 1519 ===
Upon Hernán Cortés's 6 March 1519 landing in Cozumel, during the Spanish conquest of the Aztec Empire, the conquistador learned of Guerrero and his crew-mate, Aguilar, and promptly invited both to join the entrada to Tenochtitlan. Guerrero, however, declined Cortés's offer, noting he was duty-bound to care after his family in Chetumal. Cortés, on hearing this, renewed his offer, granting Guerrero leave to bring his family along. Again, Guerrero declined, this time noting he was further duty-bound to the provincial governor, of whom he was a slave.

On arriving in Cozumel from Cuba in 1519, Cortés sent a letter by Maya messenger across to the mainland, inviting the two Spaniards, of whom he had heard rumours, to join him. Aguilar became a translator along with Doña Marina (a.k.a. "La Malinche") during the Conquest. According to the account of conquistador Bernal Díaz, when the newly freed friar Aguilar attempted to convince Guerrero to join him, Guerrero responded:

"Brother Aguilar; I am married and have three children, and they look on me as a cacique (lord) here, and captain in time of war. My face is tattooed and my ears are pierced. What would the Spaniards say about me if they saw me like this? Go and God's blessing be with you, for you have seen how handsome these children of mine are. Please give me some of those beads you have brought to give to them and I will tell them that my brothers have sent them from my own country." (Note: Spanish: "Hermano Aguilar, yo soy casado y tengo tres hijos. Tienenme por cacique y capitán, cuando hay guerras, la cara tengo labrada, y horadadas las orejas. ¿Que dirán de mi esos españoles, si me ven ir de este modo? Idos vos con la bendición de Dios, que ya veis que estos mis hijitos son bonitos, y dadme por vida vuestra de esas cuentas verdes que traeis, para darles, y diré, que mis hermanos me las envían de mi tierra.")

Díaz goes on to describe how Gonzalo's Mayan wife, Zazil Há, interrupted the conversation and angrily addressed Aguilar in her own language:

"What is this slave coming here for talking to my husband – go off with you, and don't trouble us with any more words." (Note: Spanish: "Y asimismo la india mujer del Gonzalo habló a Aguilar en su lengua, muy enojada y le dijo: Mira con qué viene este esclavo a llamar a mi marido: idos vos y no curéis de más pláticas.")

Then Aguilar spoke to Guerrero again, reminding him of his Christian faith and warning him against throwing away his everlasting soul for the sake of a native woman. But he did not convince Gonzalo.

According to Robert S. Chamberlain, Francisco de Montejo discovered that Guerrero was the military captain of Chectumal. He tried to win him over by sending him a longish letter reminding him of his Christian faith, offering him his friendship and a complete pardon, and asking him to come to the caravel. Guerrero replied by writing on the back of the letter that he could not leave his lord because he was a slave, "even though I am married and have a wife and children. I remember God, and you, Sir, and the Spaniards have a good friend in me."

Whether Guerrero maintained friendly feelings for the Spaniards or not, he remained their deadly enemy in battle, defending his new homeland and family from Spanish entradas. He led the Maya in campaigns against Cortés and his lieutenants like Pedro de Alvarado and the Panamanian governor Pedrarias. Alvarado's instructions in his Honduras campaign included an order to capture Guerrero.

=== Montejo entrada 1527 ===
Guerrero is thought to have been pivotal to the failure of Francisco de Montejo's 1527–1528 entrada against Chetumal and other provinces in eastern Yucatán. Upon completing the northern portion of the campaign, Montejo, with eight to ten men aboard La Gavarra, anchored in Chetumal's harbour in the first half of 1528. Montejo, like Cortes before him, promptly invited Guerrero to join his campaign, promising high military honours. Guerrero again declined, citing his state of enslavement, though 'offering' Montejo his friendship. Chetumal, aware that Montejo awaited infantry reinforcements to take the city, successfully conspired to keep these from arriving by various deceits concealed as friendly aid. The reinforcements were deviated off course by 'friendly' scouts, while Montejo was gently coaxed into thinking his infantrymen had met an ill end, prompting him to depart in the second quarter of 1528 without having engaged. (Note: Montejo and the Chetumal military or militia engaged in minor naval skirmishes upon Montejo's immediate arrival, but these were promptly aborted upon proving ineffective (Chamberlain 1948, p. 63).)

=== Davila entrada 1531 ===
Guerrero is also thought to have fought an extended campaign against Alonso de Avila's 1531–1533 entrada, which managed to capture the provincial capital, but ultimately likewise failed. (Note: In latter half of 1531, during a successful strike against Chetumal forces camped at Chiquitaquil, some four leagues north of the Spanish-occupied provincial capital, Davila was informed by captives that Guerrero had died, though historians now deem this to have been false intelligence (Chamberlain 1948, pp. 100, 104).)

=== Alvarado entrada 1536 ===
During the last quarter of 1535, Guerrero is thought to have led a fleet of fifty canoes across the Bay of Honduras to aid in a Cicumba-led siege of Buena Esperanza, a fledgling Spanish villa in the lower Sula Valley . The Chetumal contingent saw no engagement, however, as Cicumba's plan had been foiled by the villa prior to the fleet's arrival .

In late May or early June 1536, Pedro de Alvarado, determined to deal a death-blow to native resistance in the Sula Valley, led a successful entrada against Cicumba's fortified camp on the banks of the Ulua River. Guerrero, who is thought to have led or been among the Chetumal detachment reinforcing Cicumba's troops, died in battle from an arquebus shot.

Oviedo reports Guerrero as dead by 1532, when Montejo's lieutenants Avila and Lujón arrived again in Chectumal. Andrés de Cereceda, in a letter to the Spanish King dated 14 August 1536, writes of a battle that occurred in late June 1536 between Pedro de Alvarado and a local Honduran cacique named Çiçumba. The naked and tattooed body of a Spaniard was found dead within Çiçumba's town of Ticamaya after the battle. According to Cereceda, this Spaniard had come over with 50 war-canoes from Chetumal early in 1536, to help Çiçumba fight the Spanish who were attempting to colonize his lands. The Spaniard was killed in the battle by an arquebus shot. Although Cereceda says the Spaniard was named Gonzalo Aroca, R. Chamberlain and other historians writing about the event identify the man as Gonzalo Guerrero. Guerrero was likely 66 years old when he died.

== Legacy ==
=== Knowledge of Guerrero's existence ===
No verified firsthand accounts written by Guerrero have survived. The primary accounts of other people writing about him are our sole source of information on him. First, there is Geronimo de Aguilar, who says Guerrero was captured by the Maya at the same time as he was. Cortés exchanged letters with Guerrero, but did not meet him face to face. Bernal Díaz de Castillo wrote about the same events as Cortes. Cereceda found him dead on a battlefield in Honduras but never communicated with him. The initial Spanish attempts to chronicle the conquest, done in the late sixteenth and early seventeenth centuries (Oviedo, Herrera), mention him, but are considered less accurate than the contemporaneous accounts.

=== Recent accounts ===
Although Guerrero appears in various historical chronicles of the conquest of Mexico and media and his existence is historically attested, some accounts of him are contradictory. These, coupled with often missing facts and historical falsehoods, have led over the centuries to a continuous redefinition of the character. This process started with the chroniclers of the 16th century and culminated in the 20th century with the Mexican Indigenismo, each with their own motivation and interpretation.

Literary critic Rose-Anna M. Mueller, in an essay titled From Cult to Comics: The Representation of Gonzalo Guerrero as Cultural Hero in Mexican Popular Culture, surveys the numerous depictions of Guerrero from a reviled figure for the sixteenth-century Spanish invaders to founder of modern Mexico. Yet, like many symbols, the reality behind this myth remains very questionable.

Mueller concludes, 'while primary and secondary sources sketched Guerrero's history during the colonial period, today he has become a political and literary icon and has been transformed into a national myth... If he was reviled by the chroniclers, Guerrero has enjoyed a vindication of sorts, since he has become an exemplar who fills the need to connect the colonisers from Europe and the indigenous of the Americas in a domestic context.'

Perhaps the most famous literary work celebrating Guerrero as the father of the mestizos in Mexico remains Gonzalo Guerrero: Novela historica by Eugenio Aguirre published in 1980 in Mexico. The novel became a national bestseller and went on to win the Paris International Academy's silver medal in 1981. Another popular book published in Mexico in 1999, Guerrero and Heart's Blood by Alan Clark tells of the inward life and history of Guerrero and Aguilar. Guerrero and Aguilar are central figures in the historical novel Maya Lord by John Coe Robbins which was published in the U.S. in 2011. "The Confessions of Gonzalo Guerrero", by John Reisinger, was published in 2015, and is an historical novel written from Guerrero's point of view, exploring his motivations and conflicts, as well as his relation with his Mayan wife.

American author David Stacton fictionalised Guerrero's life and exploits in his novel A Signal Victory (1960). Recently republished by Faber & Faber, the work is "David Stacton's eighth novel, and the first in what he envisaged as an 'American Triptych'... [It] paints a vivid picture of the impact of two great civilisations upon each other [and of] Guerrero's story – that of a man who found where his true loyalties lay, and pursued them to their inevitable end."

Archeologist Joseph Guinness, a character in Douglas Grant Mine's 2022 novel April and the Gardener, has long been obsessed with Gonzalo Guerrero. The second of the Cornell University professor's two long sojourns in late-20th century Central America – a region riven by political strife in which Guinness becomes dangerously involved – allows him to discover, with the help of an elderly Guatemalan scholar, a hitherto unimaginable side of the slave-turned-warrior chief.

In a historiographic essay, social psychologist Joachim I. Krueger reinterprets the story of Gonzalo Guerrero as a radical transformation of identity which raises questions about human nature: "Perhaps Gonzalo can encourage us to take another look at where we stand and who we are. What are the forces that shape us, and how will we respond when a storm throws us up against an unfamiliar shore?"

== See also ==
- Maya civilization
- Spanish Conquest
- Spanish conquest of Honduras#Abandonment of Buena Esperanza, 1536
- Álvar Núñez Cabeza de Vaca

== Notes and references ==
=== References ===
- Adorno, Rolena (1992). "La estatua de Gonzalo Guerrero en Akumal: íconos culturales y la reactualización del pasado colonial". Revista Iberoamericana. 62 (176): 905–923. doi:10.5195/REVIBEROAMER.1996.6267.
- Adorno, Rolena (2014) [First published 2008 in Seville by Renacimiento]. De Guancane a Macondo : estudios de literatura hispanoamericana. Iluminaciones 38. Seville: Renacimiento.
- Aguirre, Eugenio (1986) [First published 1980 by Universidad Nacional Autónoma de México in México D.F.]. Gonzalo Guerrero. Lecturas Mexicanas. México D.F.: Secretaría de Educación Pública. ISBN 9789682910609. OCLC 18247640.
- Berg, Mary G.; Gyurko, Lanin A., eds. (2005). Studies in honor of Denah Lida. Potomac, Md.: Scripta Humanistica. hdl:2027/mdp.39015061867712. ISBN 1882528433. OCLC 57710350.
- Braham, Persephone (2006). "El feliz cautiverio de Gonzalo Guerrero". Hispanic Review. 74 (1): 1–17. doi:10.1353/hir.2006.0009. S2CID 163000088.
- Calder, Robert (2017). A hero for the Americas : the legend of Gonzalo Guerrero. Regina, Saskatchewan: University of Regina Press. ISBN 9780889775091. OCLC 978286075.
- Chamberlain, Robert Stoner (1948). The conquest and colonization of Yucatan, 1517-1550. Carnegie Institution of Washington Publication 582. Washington, D.C.: Carnegie Institution of Washington. hdl:2027/txu.059173008409431.
- Chamberlain, Robert Stoner (1953). The conquest and colonization of Honduras, 1502–1550. Carnegie Institution of Washington Publication 598. Washington, D.C.: Carnegie Institution of Washington. hdl:2027/txu.059173002179226.
- Díaz del Castillo, Bernal (1632). Historia verdadera de la conqvista de la Nueva-España, escrita por el Capital Bernal Diaz del Castillo, uno de sus Conquistadores. Madrid: Imprenta del Reyno. OCLC 872147430.
- Díaz del Castillo, Bernal (1800) [First published 1632 by Imp. del Reyno in Madrid]. The true history of the conquest of Mexico, by Captain Bernal Diaz del Castillo, One of the Conquerors. Historia verdadera de la conquista de la Nueva España.English. Translated by Keatinge, Maurice. London: Printed for J. Wright, Piccadilly, by John Dean, High Street, Congleton. hdl:2027/gri.ark:/13960/t1zc94736.
- Díaz del Castillo, Bernal (1961) [First published 1632 by Imp. del Reyno in Madrid]. "Historia verdadera de la conquista de la Nueva España". Ciudad de México: Fernández Editores. OCLC 29372081.
- Díaz del Castillo, Bernal (2011) [First published 1632 by Imp. del Reyno in Madrid]. Serés, Guillermo (ed.). "Historia verdadera de la conquista de la Nueva España. APARATO DE VARIANTES" (PDF). Madrid: RAE.
- Díaz del Castillo, Bernal (1844) [First published 1632 by Imp. del Reyno in Madrid]. "The Memoirs of the Conquistador Bernal Diaz del Castillo, Vol 1 (of 2) Written by Himself Containing a True and Full Account of the Discovery and Conquest of Mexico and New Spain". Translated by Lockhart, John Ingram. London: C. AND J. ADLARD, PRINTERS, BATHOLOMEW CLOSE.
- Díaz del Castillo, Bernal (1963) [First published 1632 by Imp. del Reyno in Madrid]. The Conquest of New Spain. Penguin Classics. Translated by Cohen, John Michael. London: Penguin Books. ISBN 0140441239. OCLC 526355.
- García Cruzado, Eduardo, ed. (2019). Jornadas XI, XII, XIII y XIV (2015, 2016, 2017 y 2018). Actas de las Jornadas de Historia sobre el Descubrimiento de América. Vol. IV. Sevilla y Palos de la Frontera: Universidad Internacional de Andalucía y Excmo. Ayuntamiento de Palos de la Frontera. ISBN 9788479933463. OCLC 698165875.
- González Hernández, Cristina (2018). "Gonzalo Guerrero". Diccionario Biográfico electrónico. Real Academia de la Historia.
- Jáuregui, Carlos A. (2020). Espectros y Conjuras : asedios a la Cuestion Colonial. Parecos y australes : Ensayos de cultura de la Colonia 25. Madrid: Iberoamericana Editorial Vervuert. ISBN 9788491920519. OCLC 1147702931.
- Krueger, Joachim I. (2021). "Gonzalo Guerrero and the Psychology of Identity". Current Research Journal of Social Sciences and Humanities. 4 (2): 122–132. doi:10.12944/CRJSSH.4.2.02. S2CID 245432493.
- Mine, Douglas Grant (2022). April and the Gardener. Stacked Stone Books. ISBN 9780578364414.
- Pellicer Domingo, Rosa (2007). "El cautivo cautivado: Gonzalo Guerrero en la novela mexicana del siglo XX". América sin nombre (9–10): 157–166. doi:10.14198/AMESN2007.9-10.21. hdl:10045/5661.
- Rico, José (2000). "Gonzalo Guerrero: la frontera del imaginario español". Latin American Literary Review. 28 (55): 87–109. ProQuest 1750797928.
- Rolando, M. A. (November 2016). "Belize Is Cradle Of Latin America's Mestizo Ethnic Group – Gonzalo Guerrero". Belize.com. Belmopan, Cayo: ITM.
- Romero, Rolando J. (1992). "Texts, Pre-Texts, Con-Texts: Gonzalo Guerrero in the Chronicles of Indies". Revista de Estudios Hispánicos. 26 (3): 345–367. ProQuest 1300122538.
- Waight, Larry (8 September 2022). "Gonzalo Guerrero – The First European To Make Belize His Home". Belize Hub. San Ignacio, Cayo. Archived from the original on 5 October 2022.
