= Força-Tarefa =

Brazilian television series

- Genre: Thriller, drama, police procedural
- Created by: Fernando Bonassi; Marçal Aquino
- Directed by: José Alvarenga Jr. Mário Márcio Bandarra
- Starring: Murilo Benício; Milton Gonçalves; Hermila Guedes; Fabíula Nascimento; Rodrigo Einsfeld; Nando Cunha
- Theme music composer: Tony Bellotto
- Opening theme: Polícia
- Country of origin: Brazil
- Original language: Portuguese
- No. of seasons: 2
- No. of episodes: 22

Production
- Running time: 42 minutes

Original release
- Network: Rede Globo
- Release: April 16, 2009 – December 22, 2011

Força-Tarefa (in English, "Task-Force") is a Brazilian television series directed by José Alvarenga Jr. and Mário Márcio Bandarra and written by Fernando Bonassi and Marçal Aquino. The series aired two season since April 16, 2009 on Rede Globo.

== Plot ==
The plot centers around Lieutenant Wilson, from the Military Police of Rio de Janeiro State (Polícia Militar do Estado do Rio de Janeiro), who works in the internal affairs department of the aforementioned police division. He and his teammates investigate crimes committed by the fellow members of the Military Police. Wilson answers to Colonel Caetano, an experienced and respected member of the Force, and dates Jaqueline, a nurse who regrets having a boyfriend that has no fixed time to be home. Wilson is also constantly confronted by the ghost of Jonas, a suicidal police officer who shot himself in the head in front of Wilson after being caught involved with crimes. Jonas acts like an alter-ego to Wilson, using sarcasm and realistic comments to disturb his former colleague.

Wilsion's team include Sergeant Selma, the only woman on the team; Corporal Cazarre, who is always enthusiastic and is often making sexist comments to Selma; Corporal Oberdan, who believes that logical deductions are the best way to solve crimes and Sergeants Genival and Jorge, who work in the archives of the Civil Police providing useful information and data to the team. Out on the streets, Wilson is also helped by Samuca, a paralyzed camelô who lives in the underworld of favelas and provides his police friend the information that police officers (theoretically) shouldn't know.

== Episodes ==
=== Season 1 ===
- O Sumiço de 5 Milhões (The Missing 5 Million)
- Lista Negra (Black List)
- Quadrilha de Ladrões de Carga (Gang of Shipment Robbers)
- Tolerância Zero (Zero tolerance)
- Horário de Visita (Visiting Time)
- Pais e Filhos (Parents and Children)
- Fogo Cerrado (Crossfire)
- Valor Sentimental (Sentimental Value)
- Apartamento 124 (Apartment 124)
- Apenas um Homem Honesto
- Temporada de Caça
- Plantão Noturno

=== Season 2 ===
- Dinamites Contrabandeadas
- Os Justiceiros - Parte I
- Os Justiceiros - Parte II
- Bolsa-Família
- Roleta Russa
- Buraco
- Perda Total
- O Preço da Fama
- Adeus às Armas
- Seguranças S.A.

== Cast ==
- Murilo Benício as Tenente Wilson
- Milton Gonçalves as Coronel Caetano
- Hermila Guedes as Sargento Selma
- Juliano Cazarré as Cabo Irineu
- Henrique Neves as Cabo Oberdan
- Osvaldo Baraúna as Sargento Genival
- Rodrigo Einsfeld as Praça Jorge
- Rogério Trindade as Jonas
- Fabíula Nascimento as Jaqueline
- Nando Cunha as Samuca

== Film ==
On January 8, 2015, as part of Globo's celebrations of its 50th anniversary, a film based on the series was aired. It was actually a short version of the series' third season.

=== Plot ===
As the films begins, Wilson is seen sit and quiet in a room. A woman says "session's over" and it is revealed that he was visiting the police psychologist. The film then shows that he has been drinking heavily and distancing himself from his wife Jaqueline and son Bruno. In media res, it is revealed that Wilson previously arrested a police officer, Sergeant Guedes, who harassed and robbed people from a favela raided and occupied by the police. Afterwards, Wilson was promoted to captain, but in the night he was celebrating his promotion with Colonel Caetano and his colleagues, two gunmen in a car drove-by and killed his every friend, except for Caetano. Believing it was a retaliation for arresting Guedes, he succumbs to survivor guilt and that leads to his current state.

Wilson is reminded by Samuca that his son's birthday is coming soon and decides to buy him a gift at a shopping center. Upon leaving, he tries to cut some corners using a car-exclusive ramp, and one vehicle tries to run him over. He manages to escape and believes someone tried to have him killed, but due to his recent drinking problems, people do not believe him, much to his disappointment. It is not until he suffers other attempts on his life that his colleagues are convinced that he is being targeted.

Caetano assembles a new team for Wilson: Sergeant Lidiane (Naruna Costa); Lieutenant Demétrio (Eucir de Souza) and Forensic Léo (Sérgio Cavalcante). Léo analyses some capsules from a previous attempt on Wilson's life and discovers they were fired by a 70-year-old pistol from World War II, which leaves the cops even more puzzled. When the group is alerted that Guedes escaped from prison, they believe it is him who is trying to have Wilson terminated and try to track him. When caught, Guedes explains he escaped prison to be able to visit his dying mother one last time at the hospital, which is later proven to be true.

While Wilson wonders who would be trying to kill him, he discovers his wife Jaqueline is missing. Because nobody called to demand a ransom, they are left clueless of her whereabouts and Demétrio even suggests she left Wilson for another man. After an extensive investigation, the cops discover that the car used to attempt on his life belonged to a mental care institution. There, they find out one of the patients escaped with the car. They then visit the patient's mother, who knows nothing.

It is then explained that the kidnapper is Carlos Henrique (João Miguel), a man Jaqueline met in her first years as a nurse and who fell in love with her, though she rejected him. His father was a collector of Nazi Germany artifacts and killed himself by locking himself in a garage and turning the car engine on. He left some vintage guns for his son, which would later grow crazy due to the suicide and to Jaqueline's rejection. He arranged a seemingly innocent dinner with Jaqueline but managed to abduct her. He locked her in a hotel room with a vinyl disc looping the song "Come As You Are" and explained he will now keep her forever by his side.

Another clue leads the cops to the hotel, but Carlos and Jaqueline were gone as the cops broke in. Another clue leads them to a mansion of his family in the outskirts of the city. There, Carlos attempts to kill himself and Jaqueline using the same method of suicide of his father. Wilson and his friends arrive in time and manage to rescue Jaqueline. Wilson knocks Carlos unconscious, but he wakes up and kills himself with a bullet.

== International Broadcast ==
- Brazil - Globo
- Portugal - RTP Internacional
- United States - TeleFutura
- South Korea - Canal Tele-Novela
- Poland - Tele 5 (Polcast Television)
- Panama - TVN
- Nicaragua - Canal 2
- Uruguay - Teledoce
- Argentina - Canal 9
- Ecuador - Ecuavisa
- Mozambique - STV
