= Camila Pitanga =

Brazilian actress (born 1977)

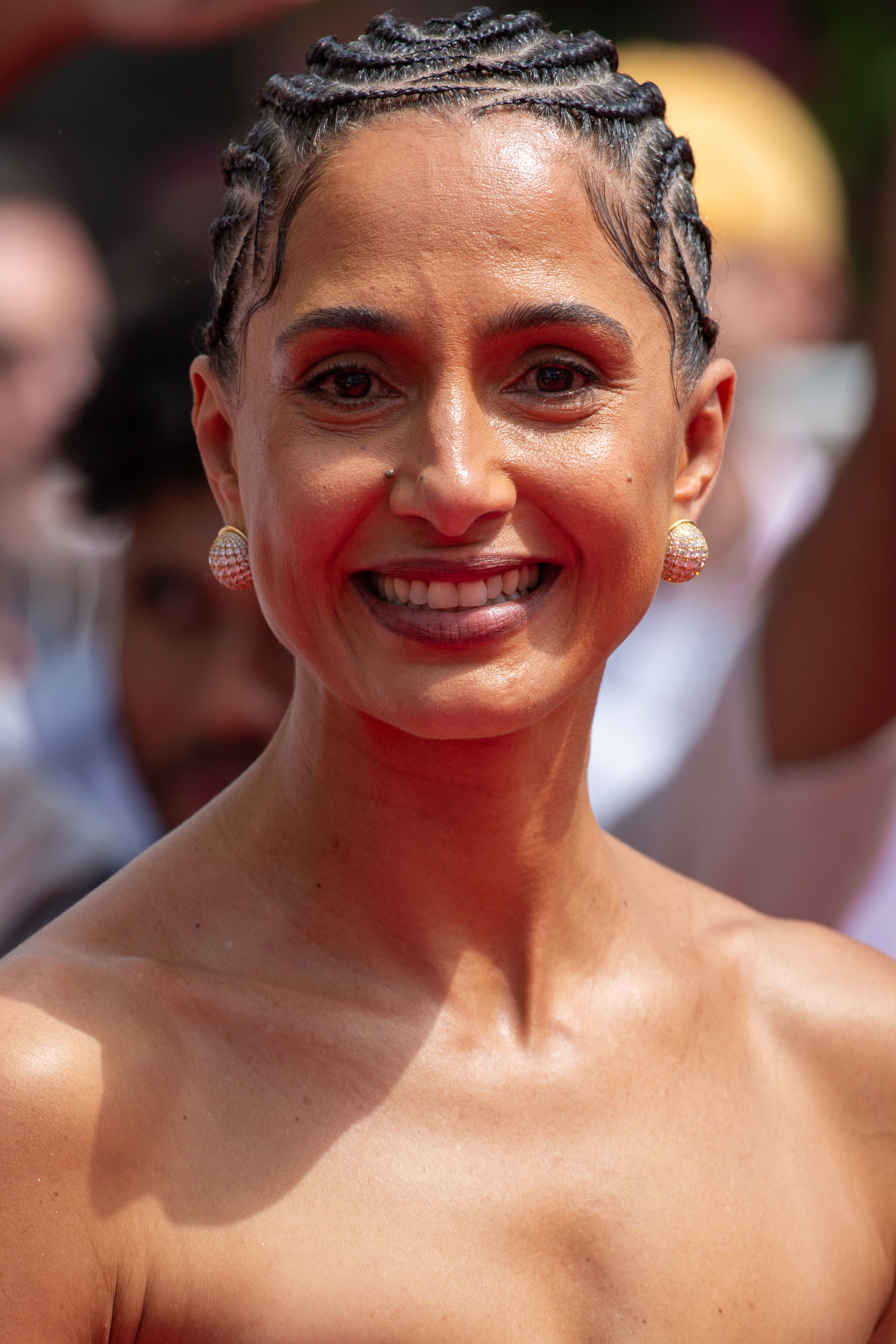
- Pitanga at the 2025 Cannes Film Festival
- Born: Camila Manhães Sampaio; 14 June 1977 (age 49); Rio de Janeiro, Brazil
- Education: Rio de Janeiro State University
- Occupation: Actress
- Years active: 1984–present
- Spouse: Cláudio Amaral Peixoto (m. 2001; div. 2011)
- Children: 1
- Father: Antônio Pitanga
- Relatives: Benedita da Silva (stepmother)

Camila Manhães Sampaio (born 14 June 1977), known professionally as Camila Pitanga, is a Brazilian actress and former model. She is internationally renowned for her roles in film and television. In film, she is known for her roles in Quilombo, Caramuru: A Invenção do Brasil, Redeemer, I'd Receive the Worst News from Your Beautiful Lips, Rio 2096: A Story of Love and Fury, among others. In television, she is known for her roles in Paraíso Tropical, Cama de Gato, Lado a Lado, Babilônia, and Velho Chico.

== Career ==
In 1984, Pintaga made her acting debut as a child in Quilombo.

Camila Pitanga starred in the film I'd Receive the Worst News from Your Beautiful Lips.

Camila starred in the telenovelas Cama de Gato, Lado a Lado, Babilônia and Velho Chico and was the antagonist in Porto dos Milagres and Paraíso Tropical.

== Personal life ==
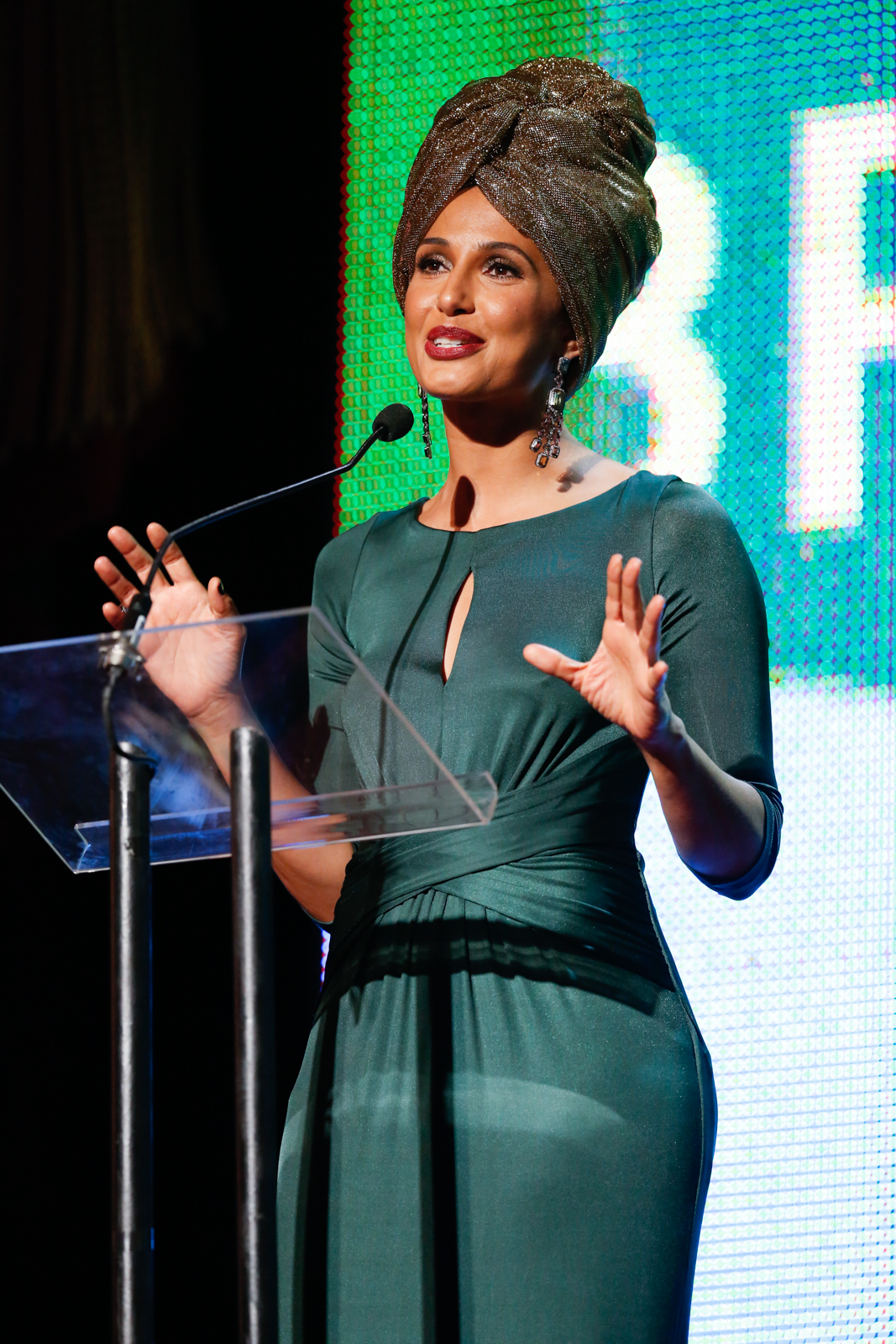
Pitanga in 2014

Pitanga was born in Rio de Janeiro, Brazil. She is the daughter of actors Vera Manhães and Antônio Pitanga and Benedita da Silva's stepdaughter. She is sister to Rocco Pitanga, also an actor. She is of African descent on her father's and mother's side.

Pintaga studied at Pentagono College and she is a director of Human Rights Movement.

Pintaga is an atheist. In 2001, she married the art director Claudio Amaral Peixoto. On 19 May 2008 she gave birth to her first daughter Antonia. The girl's name was a tribute to her father. In 2011, the couple separated.

In 2015, UN Women Brazil announced as Camila Pitanga as its first National Ambassador, and the first female Latin American spokesperson for UN Women.

== Filmography ==
=== Film ===
Title	Year	Role
Quilombo	1984	Nena
A Morte no Edifício Império	1993	Carol
Super-Colosso	1995	Camilinha
The Big Shit	1998	Girl in the Street
Atlantis: The Lost Empire	2001	Kida
Caramuru: A Invenção do Brasil	2001	Catarina Paraguaçu
Bala Perdida	2003	Marina
Redentor	2004	Soninha
Bendito Fruto	2004	Choquita
O Preço da Paz	2004	Anésia
O Signo do Caos	2005	Furacão de Santos
Sal de Prata	2005	Cassandra
Mulheres do Brasil	2006	Esmeralda
Saneamento Básico	2007	Silene
Noel - Poeta da Vila	2007	Ceci
Eu Receberia as Piores Notícias dos Seus Lindos Lábios	2012	Lavínia
Uma História de Amor e Fúria	2013	Janaína
Para Sempre Teu, Caio F.	2014	Herself
A Natureza Está Falando	2015	Amazônia
Pitanga	2017	Herself
Mise en Scène: a Artesania do Artista	2021	Herself
Malês	2025	Sabina

=== Television ===
Title	Year	Role	Notes
Sex Appeal	1993	Vilma	
Fera Ferida	1993	Teresa " Teresinha" Fronteira	
A Próxima Vítima	1995	Patrícia Noronha	
Malhação	1997	Alexandra Bittencourt	
Pecado Capital	1998		
Você Decide	1999		Episode: "Transas de Família" - Parte 1
Brava Gente	2000	Elisa	Episode: "Meia Encarnada Dura de Sangue"
A Invenção do Brasil	2000	Catarina Paraguaçu	
Garotas do Programa	2000		
Porto dos Milagres	2001	Esmeralda	
Pastores da Noite	2002	Marialva	
Mulheres Apaixonadas	2003	Luciana Ribeiro Alves	
A Grande Família	2003	Marina	Episode: "Como Rechear um Peru"
Quem Vai Ficar com Mário?	2004	Diana	
Belíssima	2005	Mônica Santana	
Paraíso Tropical	2007	Francisbel "Babel" dos Santos Batista	
Faça Sua História	2008	Cherry Davis	Episode: "Super-Mamãe Suzete e A Estrela do Irajá"
Som Brasil	2008	Presenter	
Cama de Gato	2009	Rosenilde "Rose" Pereira	
A Grande Família	2010	Marina	
Insensato Coração	2011	Carolina Miranda	
A Grande Família	2011	Kelly	
Lado a Lado	2012	Isabel Nascimento	
Sessão de Terapia	2014	Rita Costa	
Babilônia	2014	Regina Rocha Loureiro	
Velho Chico	2016	Maria Tereza de Sá Ribeiro	
Aruanas	2019	Olga Ribeiro	
Beleza Fatal	2025	Lola Fernandes Argento	
Dona de Mim	2025	Ellen Soares Silveira	Episode: "28 April"

=== Theatre ===
- 1994 - A Ira de Aquiles
- 1994 - A Ilíada .... Afrodite
- 1995 - Orfeu da Conceição
- 1995 - Odisséia .... Penélope
- 2002 - Arlequim, Servidor de Dois Patrões
- 2004 - A Maldição do Vale Negro .... Rosalinda
- 2013 - O Duelo

== Awards and nominations ==
Year	Category	Association	Nominated work	Result	Ref.
2001	Best Actress	Prêmio Guarani de Cinema Brasileiro	Caramuru	Nominated	
2004	Best Actress coadjuvante	Great Brazilian Cinema Awards	Bendito Fruto	Nominated	
2007	Best Actress	Prêmio Tudo de Bom - jornal O Dia	Paraíso Tropical	Won	
2007	Best Actress	Prêmio Qualidade Brasil	Paraíso Tropical	Won	
2007	Best Actress	Prêmio Quem de Televisão	Paraíso Tropical	Won	
2007	Best Actress	Prêmio Extra de Televisão - jornal Extra	Paraíso Tropical	Won	
2007	Best Actress	Melhores do Ano	Paraíso Tropical	Won	
2008	Revista da TV	Prêmio Faz Diferença - jornal O Globo	Paraíso Tropical	Won	
2008	Television: Best Actress	Troféu APCA	Paraíso Tropical	Won	
2008	Best Actress	Troféu Imprensa	Paraíso Tropical	Won	
2008	Best Actress	Troféu Internet - SBT	Paraíso Tropical	Won	
2008	Melhor atriz	Contigo! television Awards	Paraíso Tropical	Won	
2008	Best Romantic Actress	Contigo! television Awards	Paraíso Tropical	Won	
2011	Best Actress	Rio Festival	Eu Receberia as Piores Notícias dos seus Lindos Lábios	Won	
2011	Best Actress	Amazonas Film Festival	Eu Receberia as Piores Notícias dos seus Lindos Lábios	Won	
2012	Best Actress	Prêmio Guarani de Cinema Brasileiro	Eu Receberia as Piores Notícias dos seus Lindos Lábios	Won	
2013	Best Actress	Prêmio Fiesp/Sesi-SP de Cinema	Eu Receberia as Piores Notícias dos seus Lindos Lábios	Won	
2016	Best Actress	Melhores do Ano	Velho Chico	Won	
