= Eduardo de Sá =

Brazilian painter (1866–1940)

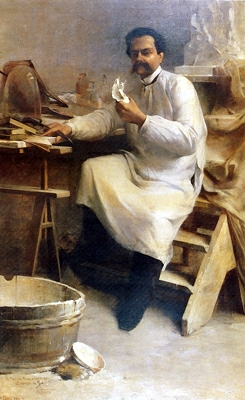
- Eduardo de Sá; portrait by Arthur Timótheo da Costa (1910)
- Born: 1 April 1866; Rio de Janeiro, Brazil
- Died: 17 December 1940 (aged 74); Rio de Janeiro, Brazil
- Education: Imperial Academy of Fine Arts; Académie Julian
- Known for: Painting, sculpture

Eduardo de Sá (1 April 1866 – 17 December 1940) was a Brazilian sculptor and painter.

== Biography ==
He began his artistic training under the direction of Victor Meirelles then, in 1883, enrolled at the Imperial Academy of Fine Arts, where he studied with João Zeferino da Costa, José Maria de Medeiros and Pedro Américo. This was followed by studies in Paris with Gustave Boulanger and Jules Joseph Lefebvre at the Académie Julian. He completed his artistic education in Florence; taking private lessons from the sculptor, Rodolfo Bernardelli.

He rarely participated in official exhibitions; preferring to hold private showings, of which there were four between 1888 and 1898. They were themed around love of the homeland and the final one was called the "Exposition of Republican Art": celebrating the 10th anniversary of the Republic.

In 1893, together with Décio Villares and Virgílio Lopes Rodrigues (1863-1944), he helped establish a movement devoted to creating a free academy of the fine arts and organized exhibitions to support the project financially. Their plans had to be abandoned, however, due to continuing social disruptions caused by the Revolta da Armada.

After the mid 1890s, he gradually turned to sculpture. His first major work was a monument to Marshall Floriano Peixoto, now located in the Plaza of the Republic in downtown Rio de Janeiro. He also created monuments to Tiradentes, Benjamin Constant and St. Francis of Assisi. Inspiration for his work came from the positivist theories of Auguste Comte.

He also worked as an architectural restorer; most notably of the roof shield at the entrance to the chapel of the Santa Casa da Misericórdia. In the late 1910s, he participated in decorating the Biblioteca Pública do Estada in Porto Alegre.

== Selected works ==
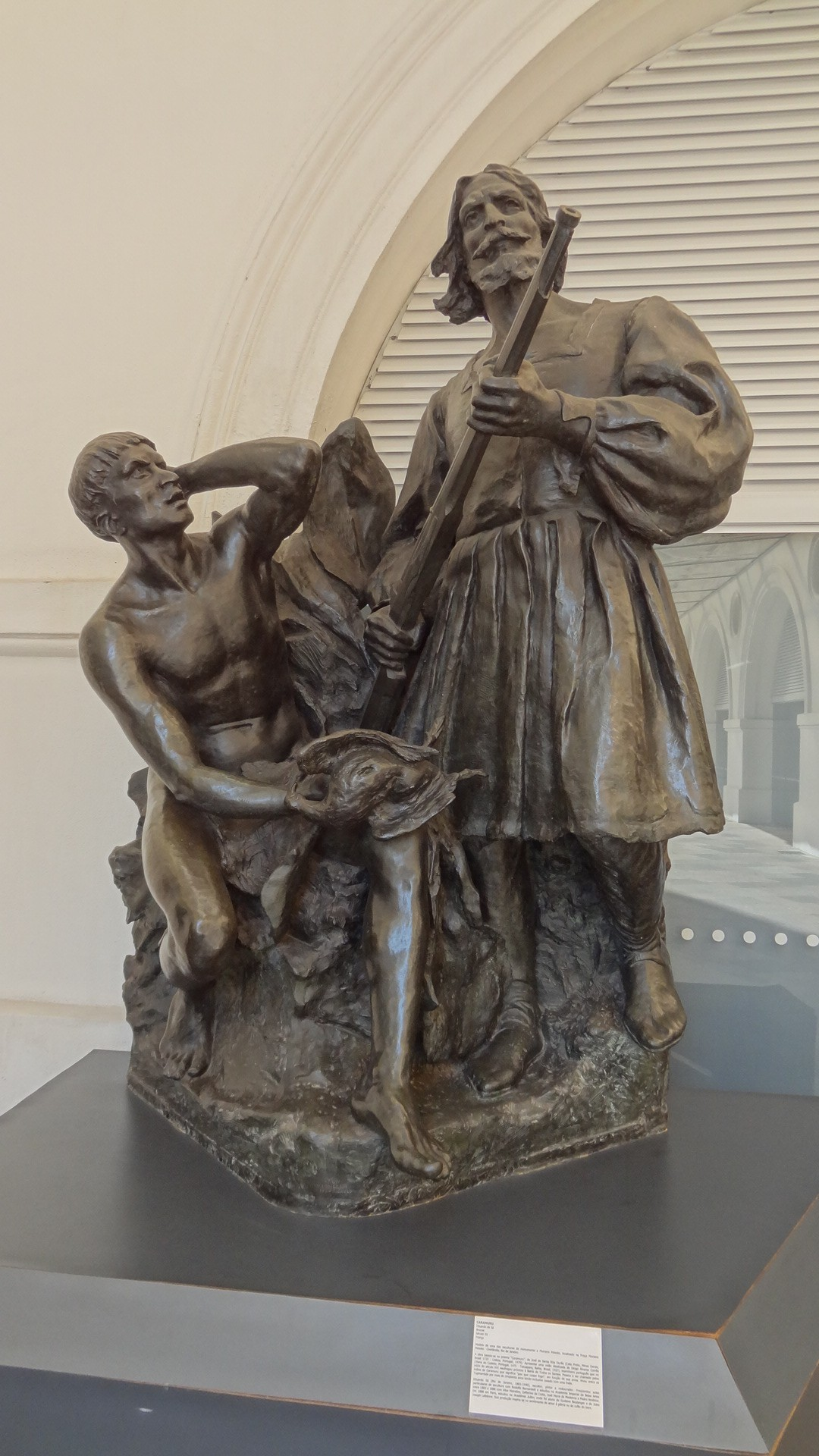
Caramuru

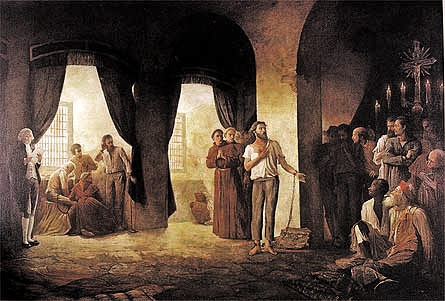
The Trial of the Rebels (Tiradentes)

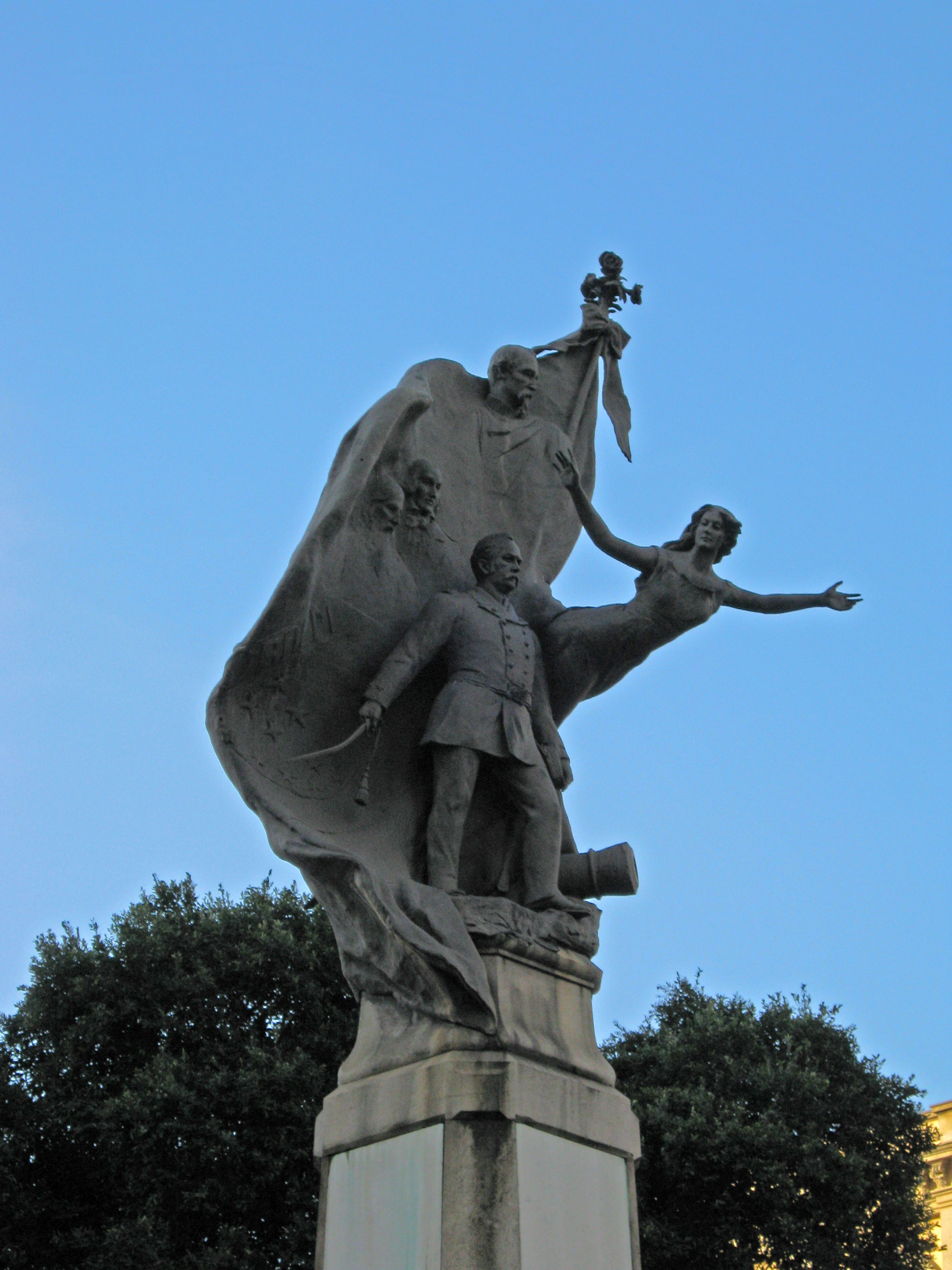
Monument to Floriano Peixoto (front)

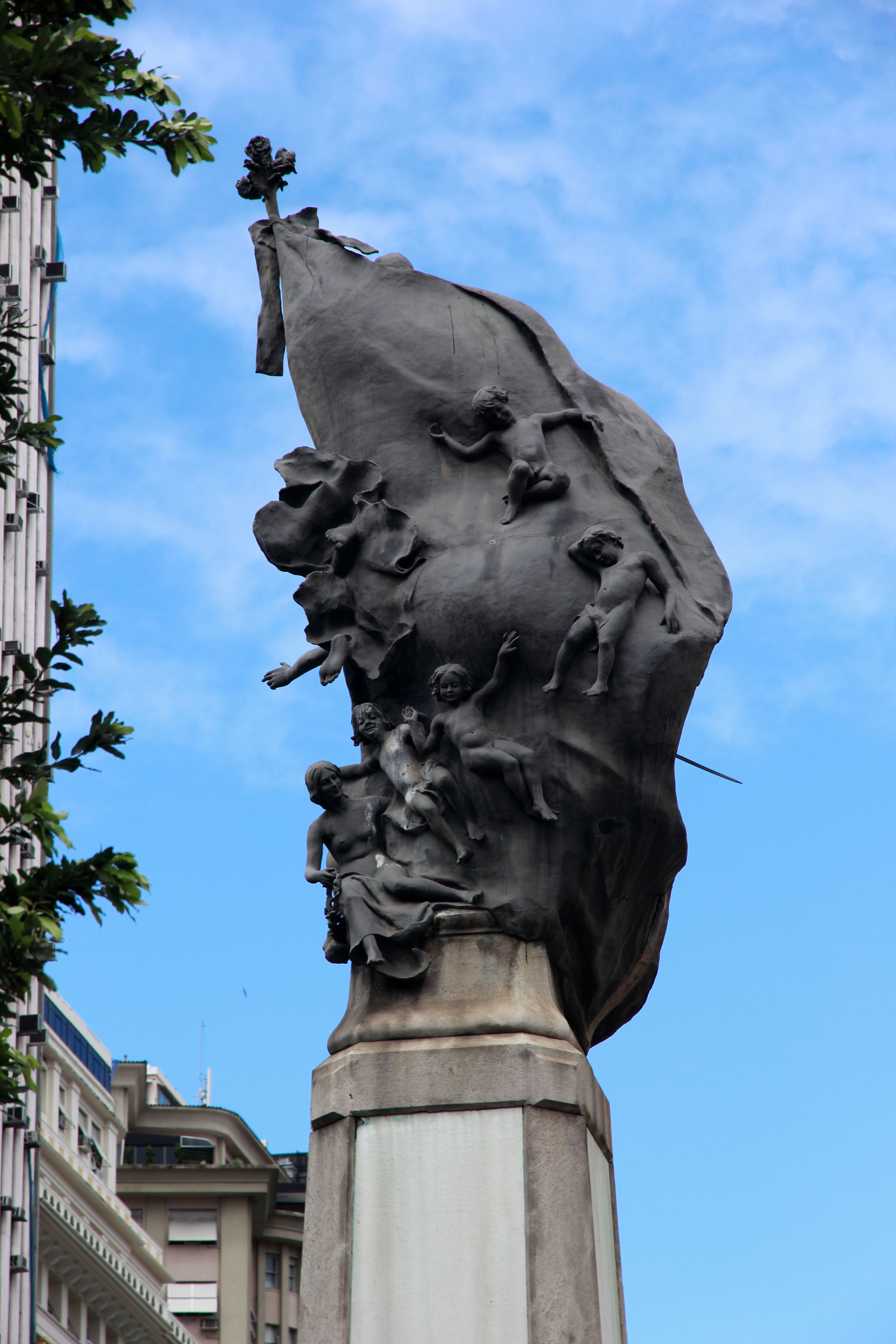
Monument to Floriano Peixoto (back)
