= I'd Receive the Worst News from Your Beautiful Lips =

2011 film directed by Beto Brant, Renato Ciasca

- Theatrical release poster
- Directed by: Beto Brant; Renato Ciasca
- Written by: Marçal Aquino; Beto Brant; Renato Ciasca
- Based on: Eu Receberia as Piores Notícias dos Seus Lindos Lábios by Marçal Aquino
- Produced by: Bianca Villar; Renato Ciasca
- Starring: Camila Pitanga; Gustavo Machado; Zecarlos Machado
- Cinematography: Lula Araújo
- Edited by: Willem Dias
- Music by: Simone Sou; Alfredo Bello
- Production company: Drama Filmes
- Distributed by: Sony Pictures Entertainment; Riofilme
- Release dates: October 11, 2011 (Festival do Rio); April 20, 2012
- Running time: 100 minutes
- Country: Brazil
- Language: Portuguese
- Budget: R$4 million
- Box office: R$538,578

I'd Receive the Worst News from Your Beautiful Lips (Portuguese: Eu Receberia as Piores Notícias dos Seus Lindos Lábios) is a 2011 Brazilian romance drama film directed by Beto Brant and Renato Ciasca. Based on a novel of the same name by Marçal Aquino, it stars Camila Pitanga, Gustavo Machado, and Zecarlos Machado, in a love triangle.

Pitanga plays the role of Lavínia, a former prostitute and drug addict who is taken from the Rio de Janeiro streets by Ernani (husband), a pastor. After a period of time, the couple is shown to be living in Santarém, Pará, where Lavínia fall in love with Cauby (lover), a photographer who sees in her a muse. It took over four months to shoot it in Santarém and Rio de Janeiro.

== Cast ==
- Camila Pitanga as Lavínia
- Gustavo Machado as Cauby
- Zecarlos Machado as Ernani
- Gero Camilo as Viktor Laurence
- Antonio Pitanga as Isaías
- Adriano Barroso as Polozzi
- Magnólio de Oliveira as Chico Chagas
- Simone Sou as Xamã

== Reception ==
It was first screened at the 2011 Festival do Rio on October 11, 2011, and was the most watched film over Pedro Almodóvar's The Skin I Live In. In Rio, Camila Pitanga won the Best Actress Award, and it was awarded the Best Film at the 37th Festival de Cine Iberoamericano de Huelva. Boyd van Hoeij from Variety said it is "more noteworthy for its atmosphere ... than the flashback-laden narrative, which, between vigorous sexual workouts, manages to be overly symbolical and soapy." Screendaily.com's Mark Adams declared "The film – while beautifully shot and appropriately steamy – then takes a dive into melodrama territory". Adams lauded how Brant and Ciasca "make the most of their striking lead actress and bring just the right amount of steamy sexual tension to what is in essence an old-fashioned melodrama."
