= Caramuru (epic poem) =

Brazilian epic poem by Santa Rita Durão

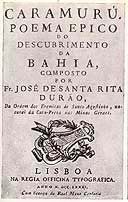
- Title page from the first edition
- Author: Santa Rita Durão
- Language: Portuguese
- Genre: Epic poem
- Publisher: Régia Oficina Tipográfica
- Publication date: 1781
- Media type: Hardcover

Caramuru [kaɾamuˈɾu] is an epic poem written by colonial Brazilian Augustinian friar Santa Rita Durão. It was published in 1781 and is one of the most famous Indianist works of Brazilian Neoclassicism – the other being Basílio da Gama's O Uraguai.

== Theme ==
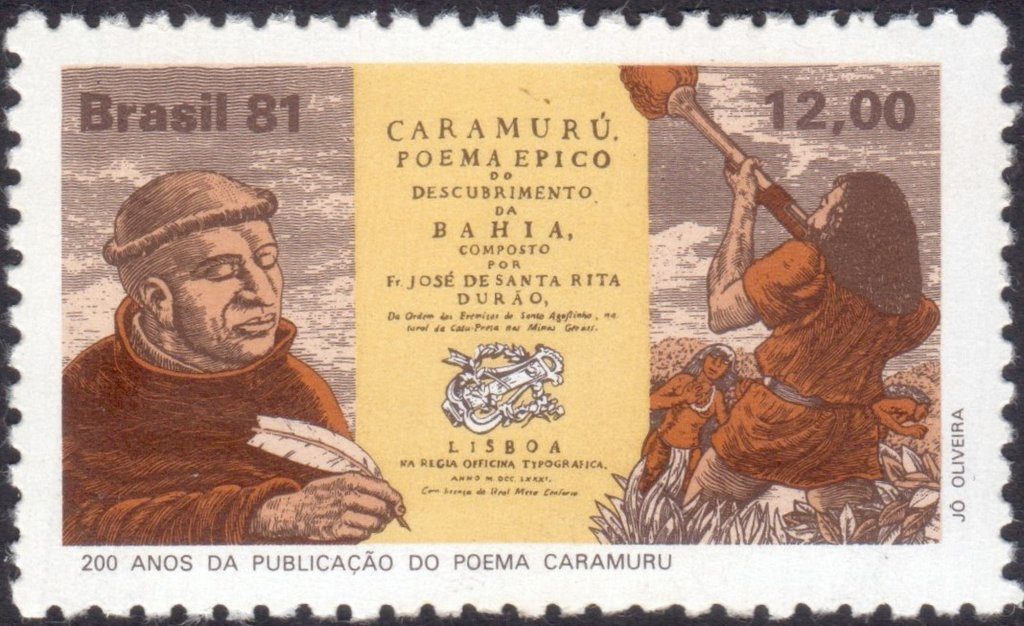
Stamp depicting the poem

Inspired by Luís de Camões' The Lusiads, it is divided in ten cantos. The poem tells the story of the famous Portuguese sailor Diogo Álvares Correia, known as "Caramuru" (Old Tupi for moray eel), who shipwrecked on the shores of present-day Bahia and had to live among the local indigenous peoples. The poem also alludes to Correia's wife, Catarina Paraguaçu, as a seer, being able to foresee the Dutch invasions of Brazil.

== Form ==
The poem is written in ottava rima (oitava rima in Portuguese). The lines consist of ten syllables and the strophe rhymes according to the abababcc pattern. Here is the first stanza of the poem. The hero "Filho do Trovão" is introduced in it.

De um varão em mil casos agitados,
Que as praias discorrendo do Ocidente,
Descobriu recôncavo afamado
Da capital brasílica potente;
Do Filho do Trovão denominado,
Que o peito domar soube à fera gente,
O valor cantarei na adversa sorte,
Pois só conheço herói quem nela é forte.

== Adaptations ==
- Caramuru: A Invenção do Brasil, a 2001 Brazilian film directed by Guel Arraes, is a loose, comedic adaptation of Durão's poem.

== See also ==
- Indianism
- Basílio da Gama
- O Uraguai
- Caramuru

== Criticism ==
- “The ancient Portugal reborn in the Brazil”: The myth of Portuguese - Brazilian Empire in the epic poem Caramuru by Santa Rita Durão.
- Belinda Mora García, The Aeneid of Brazil : Caramuru (1781).
