= Rio Vermelho (neighborhood) =

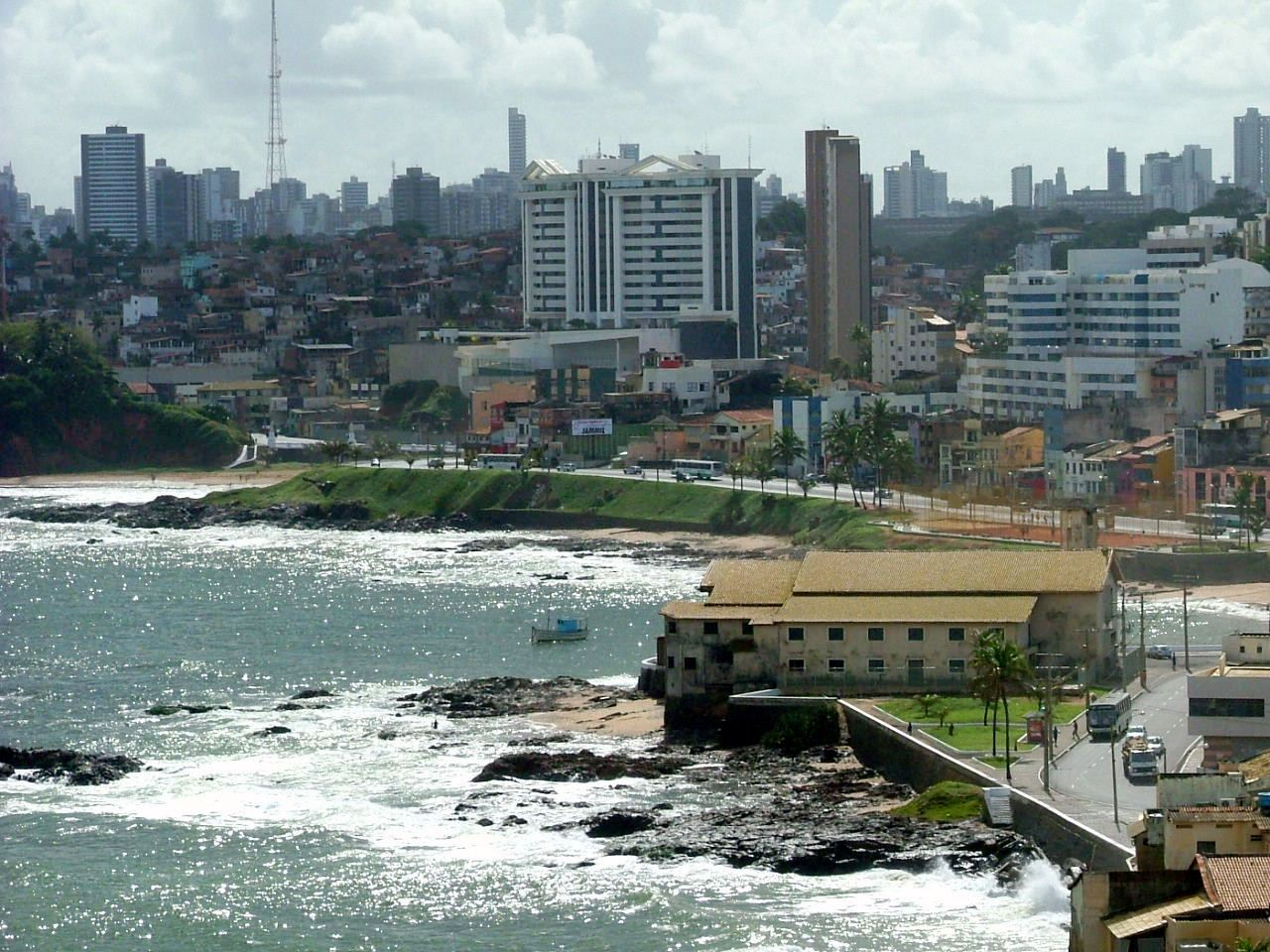
- View of beaches in Rio Vermelho

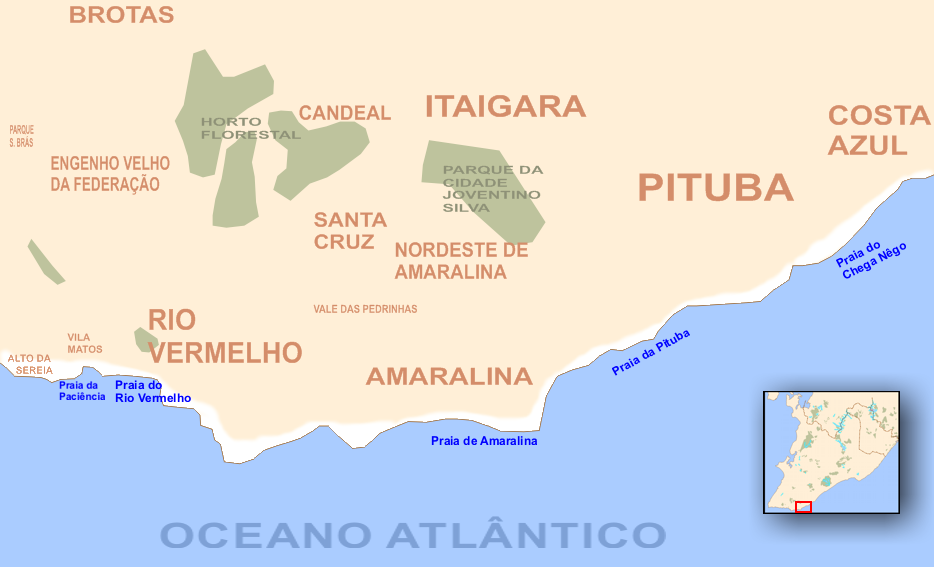
- Location of Rio Vermelho in the south of Salvador

- Location of Rio Vermelho in Brazil
- Coordinates (Rio Vermelho): 13.011177°S 38.491335°W
- Country: Brazil
- City: Salvador
- Time zone: UTC-3

Rio Vermelho (English: red river) is a neighborhood in the southern zone of Salvador, Bahia. It is located between the neighborhoods of Ondina and Amaralina, and south of Engenho Velho da Federação, Santa Cruz, and Nordeste de Amaralina. Rio Vermelho is noted for its beaches, notably Buracão, Mariquita, Santana, Paciência, and Sereia.

The name of the neighborhood comes from the Tupi language name "Camarajibe" or "River of the Camarás". Camarás (Lantana camara) are small red flowers which once grew in abundance in Salvador.

The neighborhood was home to the writer Jorge Amado and is currently home to musicians Gal Costa, Caetano Veloso, and Gilberto Gil has a home in the area too.

Rio Vermelho is a center of tourism and nightlife. There are many bars and restaurants in the area; it is a noted place to eat traditional Bahian cuisine, especially acarajé.

== History ==
View of Rio Vermelho in 1885

Diogo Álvares Correia (c. 1475–1557), better known as Caramuru, a Portuguese explorer and settler, shipwrecked off Rio Vermelho between 1510 and 1511. He lived among the Tupinambá Indians and married Paraguassu, the daughter of Morubixaba Taparica, chief of the Tupinamba. Mem de Sá, the third General Governor of Brazil, established the village of Rio Vermelho in 1557. In the 19th century, it was still a fishing village. It was later absorbed into the city of Salvador.

== Festa da Yemenjá ==
Rio Vermelho is home to Festa da Yemenjá, an important celebration in the Candomblé religion. It takes place on February 2.

== Protected status ==
A major part of the neighborhood is a protected historic district by the State of Bahia (Área de Proteção Contígua--Rio Vermelho).

Additional protected sites by the State of Bahia include:

- Largo de Santana (Santana Square)
- House No. 06 at Largo de Santana
- Casa do Rio Vermelho (Rua Alagoinhas nº 33)
