= Caramuru =

Portuguese colonist, instrumental in the early colonisation of Brazil

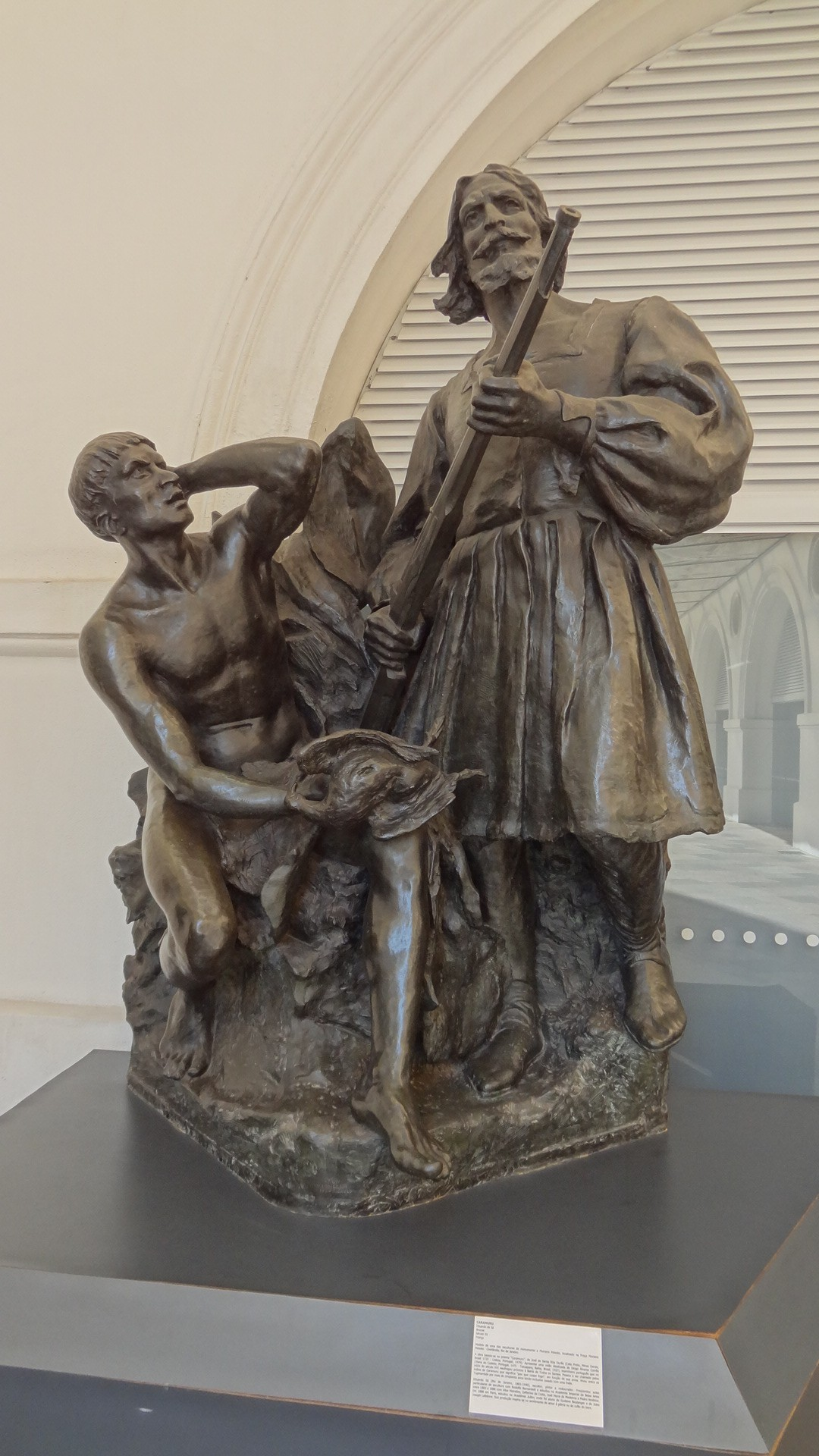
- Sculpture by Eduardo de Sá
- Born: Diogo Álvares Correia c. 1475; Viana do Castelo, Kingdom of Portugal
- Died: 5 October 1557; Salvador, Bahia, Brazil
- Occupations: Explorer and settler
- Spouse: Catarina Paraguaçu

Caramuru (c. 1475–1557) was the Tupi name of the Portuguese colonist Diogo Álvares Correia, who is notable for being the first European to establish contact with the native Tupinambá population in modern-day Brazil and was instrumental in the early colonization of Brazil by the Portuguese crown. Notably, Caramuru's native-born wife, Catarina Paraguaçu, was the first South American native to be received in France in 1526. He and Catarina became the first Christian family in Brazil and had three children: Gaspar, Gabriel and Jorge, all named knights by Tomé de Sousa.

== Life ==
Correia was born in Viana do Castelo. He departed to the Portuguese colony of Brazil in 1509, probably aboard a French vessel. His ship wrecked, probably in the reefs off Rio Vermelho, and Correia found himself alone among the Tupinambá Indians. They called him "Caramuru", meaning "moray". Correia married Paraguaçu or Paraguassu, the daughter of Morubixaba (the Tupinamba's word for chief) Taparica.

During the following twenty years, Correia kept contact with European ships and used his influence on local natives to help the Portuguese crown and missionaries during the early years of colonization. In 1526, he traveled to France with his wife. Paraguaçu was baptized by Mary Catherine des Granches, wife of Jacques Cartier, under the name Katherine du Brézil, thereby creating the first Brazilian Christian family. A couple of years later, he returned to Bahia at the request of King John III of Portugal. In 1534, he assisted Francisco Pereira Coutinho, the first captain of Bahia, in establishing the settlement of Pereira (later known as Vila Velha or "Old Town") in modern Salvador's Ladeira da Barra neighborhood. By 1546, Pereira Coutinho, accused of heresy and disobedience to the Crown, having systematically mistreated the Tupinambá, had caused them to turn hostile and Correia followed him when he fled to Porto Seguro, in order to appease the situation and bring him to his senses. When they returned the next year, the ship was damaged off the southern shore of Itaparica and the survivors captured by the Tupinambá. Correia was spared but the captain was consumed in a cannibalistic feast. In 1549, Correia aided Tomé de Sousa in founding Salvador and creating the first government over all of the Brazilian colony.

He died in October 1557, was buried in the Church of Jesus, and left half of his wealth to the Jesuits. His wife Catarina Paraguaçu died in 1582. His sons Gaspar, Gabriel, and Jorge were declared knights by Governor Tomé de Sousa for their services to the Portuguese Crown. They went on to help found Cachoeira on the Paraguaçu.

== In culture ==
- The historical episode was the central theme of an epic poem by Santa Rita Durão, titled Caramuru. He was portrayed by Selton Mello in the poem's 2001 film adaptation Caramuru: A Invenção do Brasil.
- Caramuru appears briefly in Mário de Andrade's 1928 novel, Macunaíma.
- Caramuru is the protagonist of Emilio Salgari's adventure novel "L'uomo di fuoco" (1904), translated into Portuguese, French, Spanish, Russian.
- Caramuru is a 1938 carnival song by brazilian singer Aracy de Almeida

== See also ==
- Jim Bridger
- William Buckley
- Gonzalo Guerrero
- Pākehā Māori
- Hans Staden
- John Young
