= Caramuru: A Invenção do Brasil =

2001 film by Guel Arraes

- Theatrical release poster
- Directed by: Guel Arraes
- Written by: Guel Arraes; Jorge Furtado
- Produced by: Anna Barroso
- Starring: Selton Mello; Camila Pitanga; Deborah Secco
- Cinematography: Felix Monti
- Edited by: Paulo H. Farias
- Music by: Lenine; Carlinhos Borges
- Production company: Globo Filmes
- Distributed by: Columbia TriStar
- Release date: 9 November 2001
- Running time: 85 minutes
- Country: Brazil
- Language: Portuguese
- Budget: R$2.5 million ($1,124,810)
- Box office: R$1,500,740 ($675,218)

Caramuru: A Invenção do Brasil (lit. 'Caramuru: The Invention of Brazil') is a Brazilian romantic comedy film released 9 November 2001. It is a loose, comedic adaptation of the epic poem Caramuru, written in 1781 by Brazilian friar Santa Rita Durão.

== Plot ==
Diogo Álvares gets stranded on a tropical island where he meets a beautiful native of the island, a girl called Paraguaçu and her sister Moema. The two girls become his lovers, but Diogo is already engaged to be married in his native Portugal. He's engaged to Isabelle a French noble woman, through an agreement made between the Portuguese and the French kings. On the island Diogo meets Paraguaçu and Moema's father, who after a few misunderstandings make him the tribe's chief. After some time on the island Diogo sees a caravel far out at sea. The ship approaches the shore and Diogo finally gets rescued by the Portuguese nobility on the way to India. Diogo embarks on the ship, and Paraguaçu swims after him. Diogo decides to take Paraguaçu with him to Europe.

In Europe everything is new for Paraguaçu, even the fact that people get married, a concept she did not understand. When Paraguaçu finds out that Diogo is engaged to be married to Isabelle and meets Isabelle, she makes a deal with her. She proposes that Isabelle let her marry Diogo and in exchange she will tell her where there is gold on her native island. Isabelle accepts the proposal, and Paraguaçu marries Diogo. Isabelle later finds out that Paraguaçu lied to her, she never intended to show her where there is gold. Isabelle gets arrested by the king because she did not marry Diogo according to the agreement, and Diogo and Paraguaçu return to the island, which in fact is Terra Brasilis, Brazil. The film has a happy ending, Diogo and Paraguaçu live happily ever after in Brazil.

== Cast ==
- Selton Mello as Diogo Álvares Correia
- Camila Pitanga as Paraguaçu
- Deborah Secco as Moema
- Tonico Pereira as Itaparica
- Débora Bloch as Isabelle
- Luís Melo as Dom Vasco de Athayde
- Pedro Paulo Rangel as Dom Jayme
- Diogo Vilela as Heitor

== Production ==
Based on the 2000 Rede Globo's miniseries A Invenção do Brasil, it was shot in Picinguaba beach in Ubatuba, Brazil, and at the Queluz National Palace, Leiria Castle, and Batalha Monastery, all the three later locations in Portugal. Caramuru: A Invenção do Brasil was the first Brazilian film to use high-definition quality (HDTV). The transposition process from HDTV to film stock cost R$500,000 ($224,962), and the miniseries itself was done with R$2 million ($899,848), for a total budget of R$2.5 million ($1,124,810).
