= Manuel Lopes Rodrigues =

Brazilian Realist painter

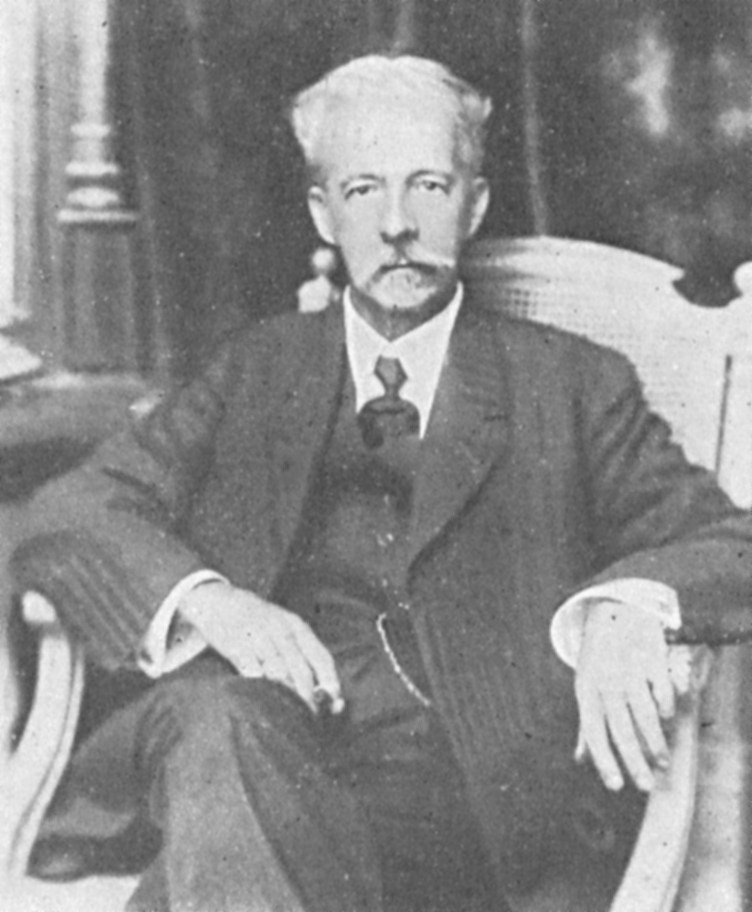
- Born: 31 December 1860
- Died: 22 October 1917

Manuel Lopes Rodrigues (December 31, 1860 — October 22, 1917) was a Brazilian Realist painter. Born in the city of Salvador, in the State of Bahia, he was initially homeschooled by his father, João Francisco Lopes Rodrigues, later entering at the Liceu de Artes e Ofícios, being taught by Miguel Navarro Cañizares.

Later, he became a teacher for the Liceu, where he taught Prisciliano Silva and Alberto Valença.

== Gallery ==
Some works by Lopes Rodrigues:

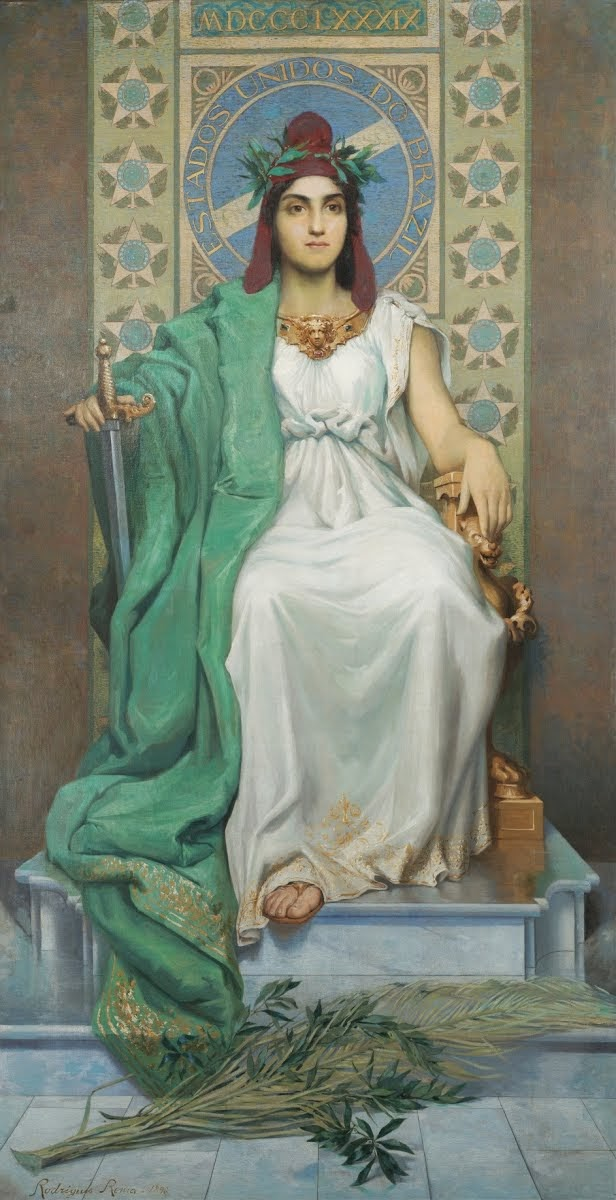
Allegory of the Republic, 1897

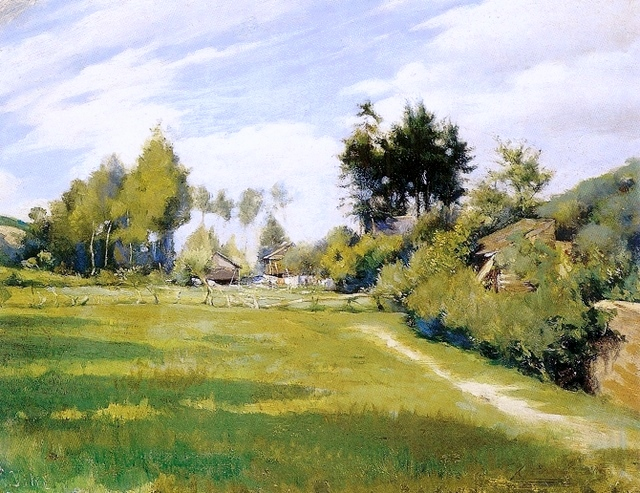
Britain Landscape, 1892

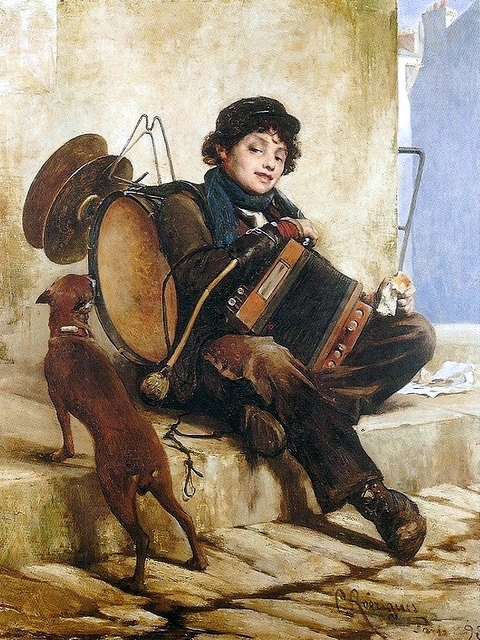
One-man Band, 1898
