= Beto Brant =

Brazilian film director

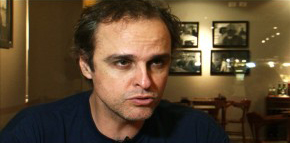
- Beto Brant in 2012
- Born: May 23, 1964 (age 62); Jundiaí, Brazil
- Occupation: Director
- Years active: 1987–present

Beto Brant (born 1964) is a Brazilian film director.

== Filmography ==
- Aurora (1987; short film)
- Dov'è Meneghetti? (1989; short film)
- Eternidad (1991; short film)
- Jó (1993; short film)
- Belly Up (1997)
- Friendly Fire (1998)
- The Trespasser (2001)
- Delicate Crime (2005)
- Stray Dog (2007)
- Love According to B. Schianberg (2009)
- I'd Receive the Worst News from Your Beautiful Lips (2011)
