= Santa Rita Durão =

Colonial Brazilian poet (1722–1784)

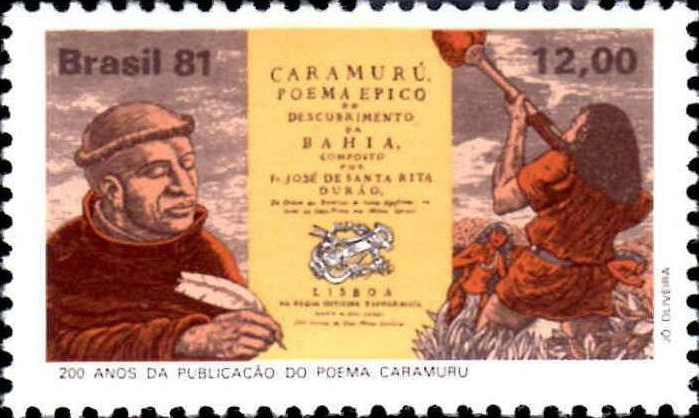
- A 1981 Brazilian stamp celebrating the 200th anniversary of Caramuru's publication; a fictionalized depiction of Durão can be seen at the left, and Diogo Álvares Correia at the right
- Born: José de Santa Rita Durão; 1722; Mariana, Colonial Brazil
- Died: 1784 (aged 61–62); Lisbon, Kingdom of Portugal
- Education: University of Coimbra
- Occupations: Orator, poet, priest
- Writing career
- Genre: Epic poetry
- Subject: Indianism
- Notable work: Caramuru
- Literary movement: Neoclassicism

José de Santa Rita Durão OSA (1722–1784), known simply as Santa Rita Durão, was a Colonial Brazilian Neoclassic poet, orator and Augustinian friar. He is considered a forerunner of "Indianism" in Brazilian literature, with his epic poem Caramuru.

He is the correspondent patron of the 9th chair of the Brazilian Academy of Letters.

== Life ==
José de Santa Rita Durão was born in Mariana, in what is now the Brazilian state of Minas Gerais, in 1722. For 10 years he studied at the Jesuit College of Rio de Janeiro and, one year later, he went to Europe, where he became an Augustinian priest. He graduated in Philosophy and Theology at the University of Coimbra, where he would occupy a Theology chair.

During the government of the Marquis of Pombal, he was persecuted and fled from Portugal. After being imprisoned in Spain as a spy, he went to Rome, where he worked as a librarian for 20 years, also travelling to Spain and France.

After the Pombaline government fell, he returned to Portugal, and delivered the opening address at the university of Coimbra for the year 1777. Soon afterwards, he retired to the cloisters of a convent. There he wrote his masterpiece and only known work: the Camões-influenced epic poem Caramuru, published in 1781 and based on the life of the famous Portuguese sailor Diogo Álvares Correia (a.k.a. "Caramuru" – Old Tupi for "moray eel"). Legend says Durão was a very prolific writer, and wrote many poems during his lifetime. However, Caramuru received lackluster reviews by the intellectuals of the time, and Durão, heart-broken, destroyed all his poems and other literary works.

He died in Lisbon in 1784.

Cultural offices
Preceded by New creation	Brazilian Academy of Letters - Correspondent patron of the 9th chair	Succeeded by John Hay (founder)
