= Brazilian hip-hop =

Music genre or scene

Brazilian hip hop is a vibrant cultural movement encompassing rap music, breakdancing, graffiti art, and DJing across Brazil. Emerging in the late 1980s in São Paulo, particularly around São Bento railway station, the movement developed a distinct social voice by addressing racial inequality, police violence, and economic hardship in Brazilian favelas.

== History ==
=== Precursors ===
Many believe that even before the consolidation of the American hip hop scene, similar forms of rhythm and poetry were already manifesting in Brazil. The first form of poetic improvisation appeared in the northeast of the country (in the region of Teixeira, Paraíba) in the 19th century. Known as "repente" or "cantoria", it is a genre of Brazilian folk music practiced by a pair of singers known as repentistas who alternate themselves in the composition of improvised strophes following very strict patterns of metric, rhyme and thematic coherence.

Also in 1964, the singer Jair Rodrigues released the samba song "Deixa Isso Pra Lá" ("Never Mind") which many consider to be the first rap song ever made in the country.

=== 1970s and 1980s ===
Brazilian hip hop has its origins in the Bailes Black (Black Parties) of the late 1970s where American funk and soul music were played. These events, which tens of thousands of people attended regularly, had become an important forum for the expression of African-Brazilian identity during the absence of democracy; the military had assumed power in 1964 and would remain in power until 1985. The Bailes Black were orientated towards playing American imports by artists such as James Brown, Funkadelic and Parliament. The influence of "Say It Loud – I'm Black and I'm Proud" by James Brown and the Civil Rights Movement is reflected in the names of the Brazilian Sound Teams (equivalent of the Jamaican Sound Systems): Black Power, Zimbabwe and Revolution of the Mind. The sound teams of the Bailes Black were soon providing opportunities for local master of ceremonies (MC) to take the stage and though the parties were still orientated towards American music they formed an important training ground for Brazilian rappers.

Other early examples of Brazilian proto-rap include songs by Gerson King Combo. Known as one of the leading voices of the Black Rio movement in the 1970s, Gérson gained fame with tracks like "Mandamentos Black" (1977) and "Melô do Mão Branca" (1980), both of which have been cited by music historians as early expressions of rap-style vocal delivery in Brazilian music. He is considered one of the most important names in Black Brazilian music, alongside Tim Maia, Hyldon, and Cassiano. His fusion of funk, soul, and socially conscious lyrics helped pave the way for the evolution of the Brazilian hip hop. Unlike artists like Tim Maia, who mixed soul and funk with elements of samba and MPB, Gerson King Combo He did not fuse his music with Brazilian styles.

By the early 1980s, the nascent Brazilian hip hop movement was centered around the city of São Paulo especially São Bento station, Galleria 24 de Maio Street and the Theatro Municipal where break dancers and rappers congregated to exchange ideas and information. In 1988, the first hip hop posse was formed by the rappers from Praça Roosevelt (Roosevelt Square) in São Paulo; calling themselves the Sindicato Negro (Black Trade Union) they were directly involved in helping other posses in the city to organize. The first Brazilian hip hop album Hip Hop, Cultura De Rua ("Hip Hop, Street Culture") was released in September 1988 on the Paralelo label; the album featured Thaide & DJ Hum, Código 13, MC Jack and O Credo. The second Brazilian hip hop album was Consciência Black Vol. 1 which featured "Pânico na Zona Sul" ("Panic on the South Side") and "Tempos Difíceis" ("Hard Times") by the group Racionais MC's as well as the song "Nossos Dias" ("Our Days") by Sharylaine who was the first female rapper to make an impact in Brazil. The influence of the Universal Zulu Nation, a US hip hop organization created by Afrika Bambaataa as an alternative to gang culture, was emulated in Brazil with the formation of the Movimento Hip Hop Organizado do Brasil (MH2O) in 1989.

=== 1990s ===
The hip hop group Posse Mente Zulu was formed in 1992 by Rappin' Hood, Johnny MC and DJ Akeen and released the track "Sou Negrão" that same year; the song with its a samba-rap, a blend of samba and hip hop elements was hugely popular and was later re-recorded by Rappin' Hood. The group Racionais MC's released their debut album Holocausto Urbano ("Urban Holocaust") on Zimbabwe Records in 1992; over the course of the next five years they would establish themselves as one of Brazil's most important hip hop groups.

GOG, Genival Oliveira Gonçalves, was the first hip hop artist from the Brasília hip hop scene to make an impact with the release in 1992 of the four-track album Peso Pesado ("Heavy Weight"). In February 1993, the first Brazilian hip hop magazine Pode Crê! ("You Can Believe It!") was published by JP Publicidade, São Paulo. The Brasília group Câmbio Negro, formed in 1990 by DJ Jamaika and X, released their debut album Sub Raça in July 1993; its mixture of rock and hip hop proved to be popular with audiences. Racionais MC's released their third album Sobrevivendo no Inferno on their own independent label Cosa Nostra in 1997; the album was certified gold in January 1998. The São Paulo rap group RZO, formed in 1989 by Sandrão, Helião, Negra li and DJ Cia, released their self-titled debut album in 1997 on M.A. Records; they would later sign with the Cosa Nostra label.

In 1997, DJ Alpiste who is said to be the first evangelical rapper in São Paulo, made his first commercial album. Alpiste's music inspired gospel rapper Pregador Luo, founder of the gospel rap group Apocalipse 16.

MV Bill, a resident of the favela Cidade de Deus (City of God), first became aware of hip hop music through the soundtrack of the 1988 US movie Colors; in 1998 he released his debut album Mandando Fechado.

=== 2000s ===
DJ Jamaika released the album Pá Doido Pirá in December 2000 on Warner Bros. In 2002, MV Bill released his second album Declaração de Guerra ("Declaration of War") and has since established himself as one of the most articulate and controversial hip hop artists in Brazil. The rapper Sabotage, from the South Zone in São Paulo, achieved major success with the release of his debut album Rap É Compromisso ("Rap Is Commitment") in 2002 on the Cosa Nostra label; his promising career was brought to an end after he was killed in January 2003.

The second album A Procura da Batida Perfeita ("Looking for the Perfect Beat") by the rapper Marcelo D2 (former frontman of rap rock group Planet Hemp) was released in 2003; its fusion of samba and hip hop was a hit leading to an appearance on Acústico MTV where he performed acoustic versions of the tracks from the album. In 2006, GOG released the album Aviso às Gerações ("Notice to the Generations") which featured a collaboration with MC RAPadura on the song "A quem possa interessar". MC RAPadura had established his reputation in repente (improvised rap contests using Brazilian forró music) and would later achieve success with his distinctive rapping style, which consists of mixing hip hop music with forró and baião.

Emicida is a rapper from São Paulo who released his first single "Triunfo" in 2008 and is one of the first Brazilian hip hop artists to establish himself by posting his music on social networks and video sites. In 2008, the female rapper Flora Matos released the track "Mundo Pequeno" which was produced by DJ Cia, and directed by Mano Brown and Ice Blue of Racionais MC's. The track was featured on the compilation mixtape O Jogo é Hoje.

=== Politics and rap ===
Initially Brazilian hip hop was an assertion of African-Brazilian identity and a continuation of the ethos of the 1970s Bailes Black. As the genre gradually emerged, drawing new artists and audiences into its sphere, its themes widened to encompass a range of social and political issues. In 1993, Gabriel o Pensador, a writer and son of a prominent journalist, released the satirical rap song "Tô Feliz, Matei o Presidente" ("I'm Glad, I've Killed the President") about the impeachment of former president Fernando Collor on corruption related charges. The mangue beat group Chico Science adhered to a musical style known as rap consciencia (socially conscious rap).

== Popular culture ==
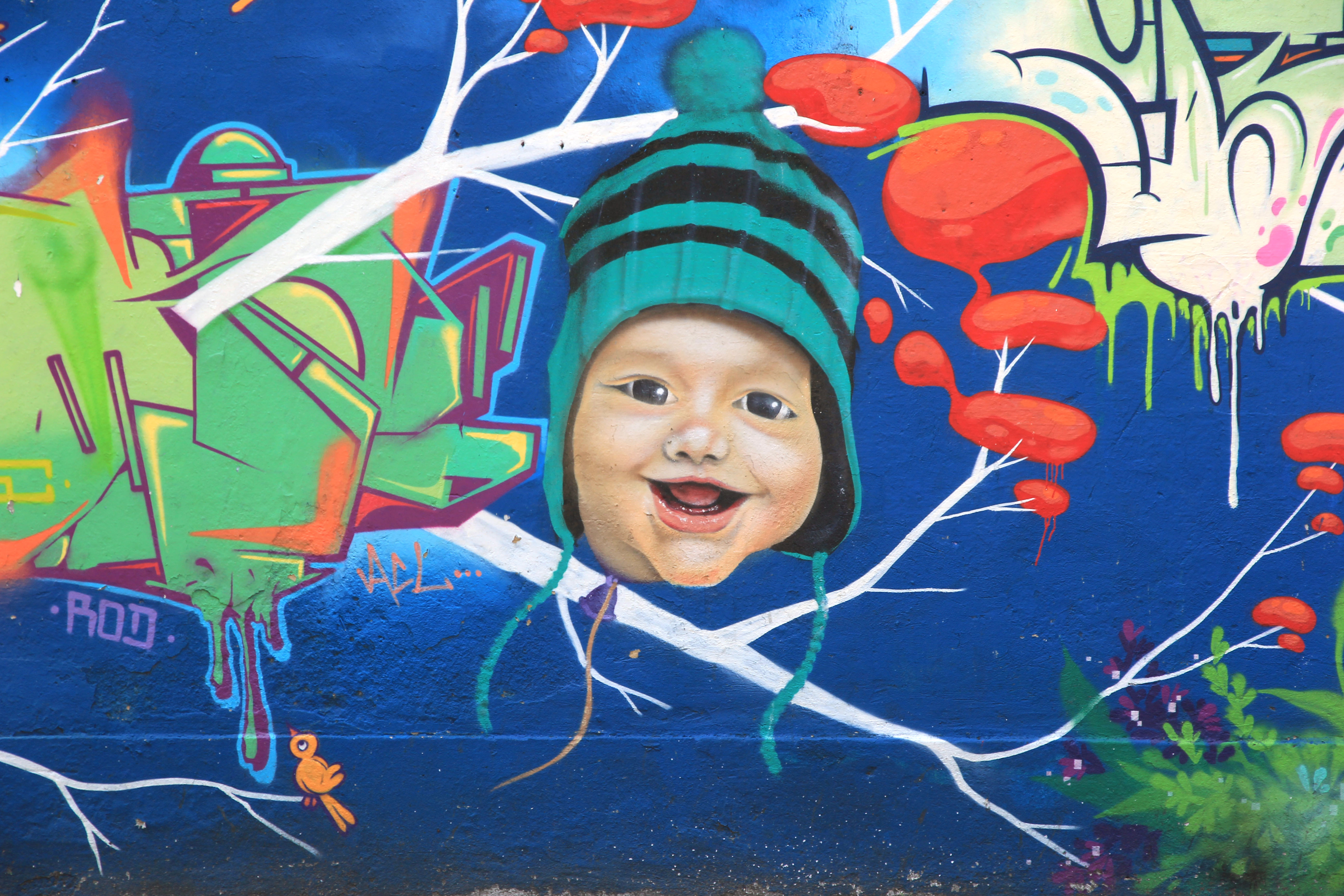
Graffiti art in Rio de Janeiro

The television series Cidade dos Homens ("City of Men") was created by the directors of the film City of God. It was broadcast for four seasons on Globo TV between 2002 and 2005. It follows the fictional lives of two best friends, Luis Claudío (nickname Acerola) and Uolace (nickname Laranjinha), who are growing up together in a favela of Rio de Janeiro. Funk carioca and hip hop forms the musical backdrop to their adventures and is featured prominently throughout the series. The episode "Hip Sampa Hop", in which Acerola and Laranjinha visit the city of São Paulo, includes short interviews with the hip hop artists Xis, Thaide and Rappin' Hood.

Brazilian hip hop and its relationship to the favela is the subject of the 2005 documentary Favela Rising. The documentary details the efforts of the AfroReggae movement which was formed in 1993 by Anderson Sa and DJ Jose Junior with the express purpose of providing a cultural outlet for young people as an alternative to the favela gang culture through a series of non-profit schemes involving music and dance. AfroReggae are also a musical group that fuses traditional Brazilian dance music with hip hop and reggae.

== Education ==
Derek Pardue in his article Hip Hop as Pedagogy examines the concepts of "periferia" (periphery) and "marginalidade" (marginality) in relation to hip hop identity as well as hip hop's potential pedagogical value. Pardue proposes that the common perception of hip hop as a US cultural entertainment phenomena reflecting exclusive themes of urban gang membership and masculinity may be discarded for a more realistic assessment of its educational benefits especially with regards to the young people of the favelas. Pardue cites the expansion of CEUs (Unified Educational Centers) into favelas and the employment of hip hop educationalists as examples of educational models that build upon earlier social and communal actions initiated by those from rural Brazil that settled on the outskirts of major Brazilian cities. Pardue highlights that many hip hop artists and residents from the favelas have formed educational NGOs and have actively participated in state sponsored schemes designed not only to improve the lives of those who are economically marginalized but also with a view of promoting hip hop as a positive contribution to citizenship within wider society. Pardue points out that hip hop educationalists realize the importance of hip hop and its role in the lives of the young people of the favelas and that its pedagogical value serves to benefit not only those on the periphery but also the wider aims of state education.

== Other artists ==
- 509-E
- Black Alien & Speed
- Coyote Beatz
- Criolo
- De Leve
- Emicida
- Facção Central
- Racionais MC's
- Tribo da Periferia
- Consciência Humana
- Wem
- Sabotage

== Notable songs ==
- "Nossos Dias" (1988) - Sharylaine
- "Corpo Fechado" (1988) - Thaíde & DJ Hum
- "Sou Negrão" (1992) - Posse Mente Zulu
- "Homem Na Estrada" (1993) - Racionais MC's
- "Tô Feliz (Matei o Presidente)" (1993) - Gabriel, O Pensador
- "Cada um por Si" (1994) - Sistema Negro
- "O Trem" (1997) – RZO
- "Traficando Informação" (1998) - MV Bill
- "Isso aqui é uma guerra" (1999) - Facção Central
- "Dia de Visita" (1999) - Realidade Cruel
- "O Quinto Vigia" (2000) - Ndee Naldinho
- "Mun Rá" (2002) - Sabotage & Instituto
- "Negro Drama" (2002) - Racionais MC's
- "Feito no Brasil" – Face da Morte

== Films ==
- São Paulo, le rap de la saturation - directed by Yves Billon
- Favela Rising - directed by Jeff Zimbalist and Matt Mochary
- Estilo Hip Hop - directed by Loira Limbal and Vee Bravo
