= Daniel Ganjaman =

Brazilian musician (born 1978)

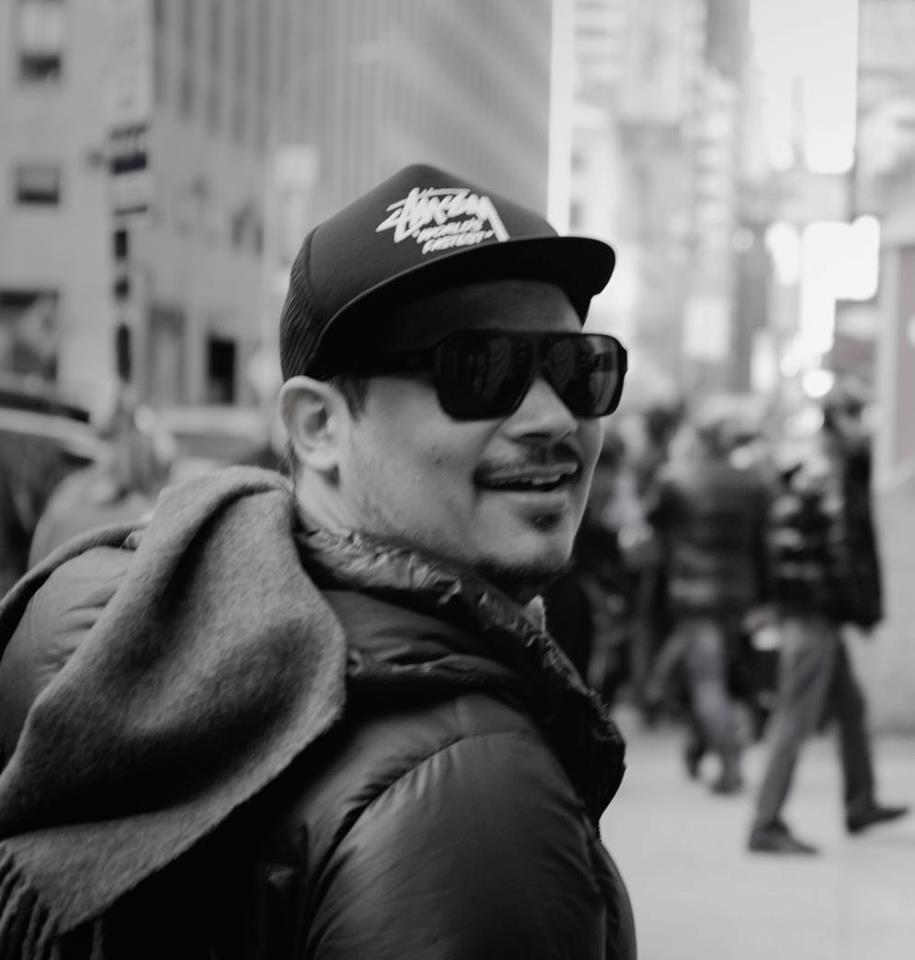

Background information
- Born: Daniel Sanches Takara; April 21, 1978 (age 48)
- Origin: São Paulo, Brazil
- Genres: Hip hop
- Occupations: Hip-hop producer, musician, sound engineer
- Years active: 1994–present
- Label: El Rocha Records

Daniel Sanches Takara, better known by his stage name Daniel Ganjaman, is a Brazilian hip-hop producer, musician, sound engineer and Latin Grammy-winner. Daniel is known for his work with Brazilian artists Criolo, Sabotage, BaianaSystem, among others. He has been nominated for the Latin Grammy four times and won once with BaianaSystem.

== Career ==
Son of retired musician Claudio Takara (now owner of El Rocha studio), Daniel Ganjaman has been in contact with various audio equipments and musical instruments since he was a child. In the mid-1990s, he played guitar, bass and sang in some punk and hardcore bands from São Paulo, in addition to actively working in the production of events in the Paulista cultural scene.

In 1997, together with his father and brothers (Fernando Sanches and Maurício Takara respectively), Ganjaman opened El Rocha studio, where he took his first steps as a producer, working with several bands from the São Paulo independent scene, being that many of the projects he produced at that time were not even credited. His professional relationship with Rap became closer thanks to his contact with DJ Nuts and Zé Gonzales, with whom he produced some projects.

His first big job was in the musical direction of Otto, going on tour promoting the Pernambuco artist's first album, Samba pra Burro, and performing at important festivals, such as the Central Park Summerstage in New York City, Roskilde Festival in Denmark and Transmusicales in France.

At the beginning of the year 2000, he was invited to participate in the production of the album A invasão do sagaz homem fumaça by Planet Hemp. After finishing the recording, he joined the group to tour the album that lasted just over a year, passing through practically all Brazilian capitals, the United States and Japan. In parallel with their activities with Planet Hemp, Daniel Ganjaman and Zé Gonzales were invited by Mano Brown to produce the classic Sabotage album Rap é Compromisso.

In 2006, Ganjaman produced Homem-Espuma, Mombojó's second album. The group from Recife, which had a shy debut two years before, managed to gather some mainstream recognition and leave the alternative circuit that it inhabited at the time.

In 2011, Ganjaman gained prominence for the production of the album Nó na Orelha by singer-songwriter Criolo, which won several awards for album of the year, including the Video Music Brasil Award by MTV Brasil.

In 2017, 2018 and 2019, Ganjaman had four projects nominated for a Latin Grammy, among them the winner of "Best Rock or Alternative Music Album in the Portuguese Language" in 2019 with the album O Futuro Não Demora by BaianaSystem.

In 2021, Ganjaman founded the music label El Rocha Records.

== Production credits ==
Year	Album	Role
2000	Planet Hemp - A Invasão do Sagaz Homem Fumaça	Musician, Composer, Author
2000	Sabotage - Rap É Compromisso!	Producer, Musician
2001	Seu Jorge - Samba Esporte Fino	Producer (Track "Em Nagoya eu vi Eriko"), Musician
2001	Otto - Condom Black	Musician
2002	Racionais MC's - Nada Como um Dia Após o Outro Dia	Producer, Recording, Mixing, Musician
2003	BNegão & os Seletores de Frequência - Enxugando Gelo	Musician, Author
2005	Natiruts - Nossa Missão	Musician
2008	Kamau - Non Ducor Duco	Musician
2016	Sabotage - Sabotage	Producer, Artistic Director, Arrangement, Recording, Mixing, Musician
2016	Síntese - Trilha Para o Desencanto da Ilusão Vol. 1: Amem	Producer, Director, Arrangement, Recording, Musician
2019	BaianaSystem - O Futuro Não Demora	Producer, Recording, Mixing
2020	BaianaSystem e Antonio Carlos e Jocafi - "Miçanga" (Single)	Producer, Mixing
2020	Milton Nascimento e Criolo - Existe Amor	Producer, Recording, Mixing
2021	BaianaSystem e BNegão - "Reza Forte" (Single)	Producer, Mixing
2021	BaianaSystem - OxeAxeExu	Producer, Mixing, Musician

== Awards ==
- Latin Grammy 2019 (winner for Best Rock or Alternative Music Album in the Portuguese Language)
