= Yzalú =

Brazilian singer

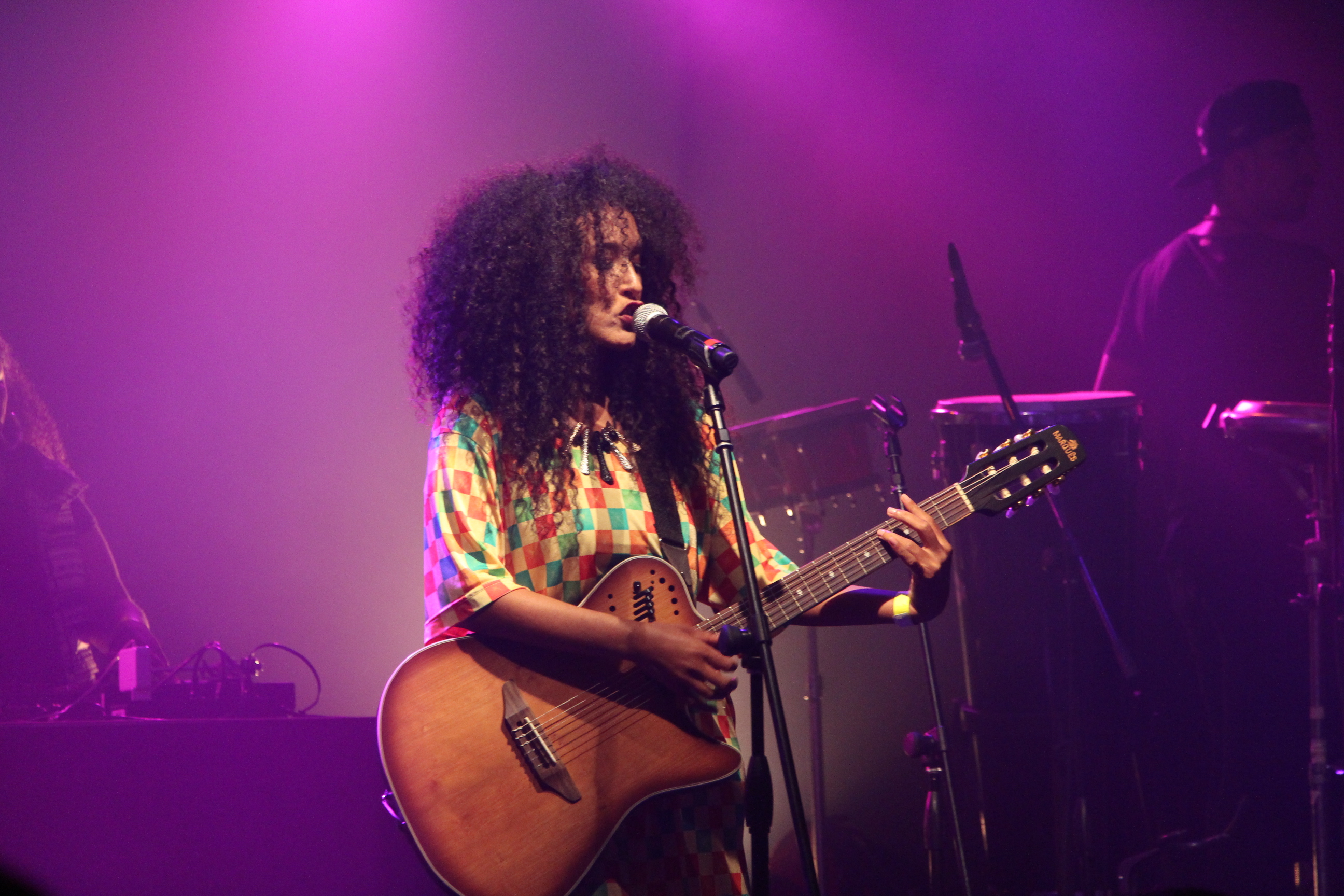
- Yzalú performing in 2017

Background information
- Born: Luiza Yara Lopes Silva; September 8, 1982 (age 44); São Bernardo do Campo, Brazil
- Genres: MPB; Brazilian hip hop; Hip hop; Alternative Hip hop
- Occupations: Singer; songwriter; musician
- Instruments: Vocals; guitar
- Years active: 2012–present
- Website: Official website

Luiza Yara Lopes Silva (September 8, 1982), better known as Yzalú, is a Brazilian singer-songwriter and guitarist. She drew attention when interpreting the song "Mulheres Negras" (2012). With the participation of the rapper Eduardo, evidencing the reality of the women in Brazil, the music became symbol of the black feminism in the country.

== Career ==
Yzalú was born in São Bernardo do Campo, São Paulo on September 8, 1982. Yzalú began her career at age 16 when she lived in Salvador, Bahia, improving her knowledge of the guitar. Her influence comes from the American rapper Lauryn Hill, one of the greatest rap artists of the 1990s.

In 2003, Yzalú began performing in bars and ballads in São Paulo interpreting MPB's hits. She was invited to join the female rap group of São Bernardo do Campo Essência Black, formed by Regiane Oliveira and Elisângela Oliveira, starting to perform in theaters in the city, partnering with other artists in the region, such as hip hop group Ordem Própria.

In 2005, the artist had to leave the music to dedicate herself to work and studies to be able to keep up. She studied marketing at the Methodist University and in 2008 decided to return to music motivated by her brother who influenced the idea of making some homemade videos in the staircase of Jardim Farina neighborhood of her hometown singing classic Brazilian hip hop.

In 2012, she was invited to participate in the DVD of the rap group Detentes do Rap. With the participation of several Brazilian artists such as Mano Brown, Eduardo, Dexter, DBS & A Quadrilha, Realidade Cruel and Ferréz.

In 2016, Yzalú released her first CD titled, "Minha Bossa É Treta", produced by Marcelo Sanches, the album transits in MPB, Samba, Jazz and Bossa Nova.

In 2016, in a presentation at Sesc in São Paulo, she sang a song "Figura Difícil" with the name of rapper Sabotage. The song was released on the newly released album.

== Discography ==
=== Studio albums ===
- Minha Bossa É Treta (2016)
