= Nada Como um Dia Após o Outro Dia =

Studio album by Racionais MC's
- Released: 27 October 2002
- Genres: Gangsta rap; Conscious hip hop
- Length: 110:24
- Language: Portuguese
- Label: Casa Nostra
- Producer: Racionais MC's

Racionais MC's chronology
Ao Vivo (2001)	Nada Como um Dia Após o Outro Dia (2002)	1000 Trutas, 1000 Tretas (2006)

Singles from Nada Como um Dia Após o Outro Dia
- 1. "Vida Loka I" Released: 2002; 2. "Vida Loka II" Released: 2002; 3. "Negro Drama" Released: 2002; 4. "Jesus Chorou" Released: 2002; 5. "Estilo Cachorro" Released: 2002

Nada Como um Dia Após o Outro Dia (English: Nothing Like the Day After Another Day), also released as Nada Como um Dia Após o Outro Dia, Vol. 1 & 2, is the third studio album by Brazilian hip-hop group Racionais MC's, released on 27 October 2002 through Casa Nostra.

A two-volume album, the project was critically acclaimed, named as one of the best Brazilian albums of all time by Rolling Stone. It also won the Prêmio Hutúz for Album of the Year in 2002. It includes some of the group's most recognizable songs such as "Vida Loka I", "Vida Loka II", "Negro Drama" and "Jesus Chorou". The cover art for the album features Ice Blue in front of a Chevrolet Impala.

== Background ==
Nada Como um Dia Após o Outro Dia was released in 2002, following the commercial success of Sobrevivendo no Inferno (1998) and the release of the group's first live album Ao Vivo (2001). It spanned five singles, "Vida Loka I", "Vida Loka II", "Negro Dama", "Jesus Chorou" and "Estilo Cachorro", all released through 2002.

In 2006, the group released 1000 Trutas, 1000 Tretas, their second live album and first DVD. It is composed of mostly songs from Nada Como um Dia Após o Outro Dia, including all the singles except "Estilo Cachorro".

== Composition ==
Consisting of 21 songs, the album is divided in two parts, the first is an eleven-song volume named Chora Agora ("Cry Now") while the second is a ten-song volume named Ri Depois ("Laugh Later"). It makes significant use of sampling with most of the songs in the album sampling one or more songs, both by Racionais MC's themselves as well as by artist such as Marvin Gaye, Al Green and various musicians from Brazil, among others.

The album is framed within a fictional radio transmission. The interlude "Sou + Você" opens the album with Mano Brown playing the host of Radio Êxodos. It ends with the eight-minute track "Da Ponte pra Cá". Similar to their previous studio album, Nada Como um Dia Após o Outro Dia deals with themes of class inequality and racism, as well as the experiences of life in the periphery of São Paulo, Brazil. Jail life is discussed in "Vida Loka Pt. 1", while experiences of triumph and social mobility are celebrated in "Vida Loka Pt. 2". Racism appears as a topic in songs like "Negro Drama", which deals with the hardships of being a Black person in Brazilian society and "A Vida é Desafio", which addresses issues such as dreams in the midst of racism and the future perspectives of Black people. Cars make recurrent appearances as symbols of success and money throughout the album, like in the cover art as well as in "Vida Loka Pt. 2", which features the line "Imagina nóis de Audi ou de Citroën. Indo aqui, indo ali. Só pam de vai e vem" ("Imagine us in Audi or Citroën. Going here, going there. Just 'pam' back and forth"). In addition, the song "A Vitima" tells the story of an accident that took place in 1999 at Marginal Pinheiros, a highway in São Paulo, where Edi Rock crashed against a Kombi while driving his Opel Diplomat, causing the death of the driver of the Kombi.

== Track listing ==
All tracks were produced by Racionais MC's.

Disc one – Chora Agora
No.	Title	Writer(s)	Length
1.	"Sou + Você"	Mano Brown	1:48
2.	"Vivão E Vivendo"	Mano Brown	1:58
3.	"Vida Loka (Intro)"	Mano Brown	0:24
4.	"Vida Loka, Pt. 1"	Mano Brown	5:03
5.	"Negro Drama"	Mano Brown; Edi Rock	6:51
6.	"A Vítima"	Edi Rock	7:20
7.	"Na Fé Firmão"	Edi Rock	6:05
8.	"12 de Outubro"	Mano Brown	3:31
9.	"Eu Sou 157"	Mano Brown; Ice Blue	8:50
10.	"A Vida É Desafio" (featuring Afro-X)	Mano Brown	7:13
11.	"1 por Amor 2 por Dinheiro" (featuring Trilha Sonora do Gueto & Rosana Bronks)	Mano Brown; Ice Blue; Rosana Bronks	6:58
Total length:			55:58

Disc two – Ri Depois
No.	Title	Writer(s)	Length
1.	"De Volta à Cena"	Edi Rock	2:01
2.	"Otus 500"	Edi Rock	2:11
3.	"Crime Vai e Vem"	Edi Rock; Ice Blue	7:55
4.	"Jesus Chorou"	Mano Brown	7:51
5.	"Fone (Intro)"	Ice Blue	1:56
6.	"Estilo Cachorro"	Edi Rock; Ice Blue	6:17
7.	"Vida Loka, Pt. 2"	Mano Brown	5:50
8.	"Expresso da Meia-Noite"	Edi Rock; Ice Blue	5:21
9.	"Trutas e Quebradas"	Mano Brown; Edi Rock; Ice Blue; KL Jay	6:17
10.	"Da Ponte pra Cá"	Mano Brown; Ice Blue	8:47
Total length:			54:26

=== Sample credits ===
- Taken from Genius:
  - "Sou + Você" samples the song "Uma Lágrima", written and performed by Cassiano.
  - "Vida Loka, Pt. 1" samples the songs "Soon I'll Be Loving You Again", written by Arthur "T-Boy" Ross, Marvin Gaye and Leon Ware, and performed by Marvin Gaye; and "You Are My Love", written by Billy Kinsley and Roger Scott Craig, and performed by Liverpool Express.
  - "Negro Drama" samples the song "My First Night Alone Without You", written by Kin Vassy and performed by Dionne Warwick.
  - "Eu Sou 157" samples the songs "Georgia on My Mind", written by Hoagy Carmichael and Stuart Gorrell, and performed by Ray Charles; and "Orai Por Nós", written and performed by Dudu Nobre.
  - "De Volta à Cena" samples the song "Simply Beautiful", written and performed by Al Green.
  - "Otus 500" samples the songs "Carta a Sociedade", written by Afro-X and performed by 509-E; "Voz Ativa", written by Mano Brown, Ice Blue and Edi Rock, and performed by Racionais MC's; and "Racistas Otários", written by Mano Brown and Ice Blue, and performed by Racionais MC's.
  - "Jesus Chorou" samples the songs "Strager in Paradise", written by George Forrest and Robert Craig Wright, and performed by Isaac Hayes; and "Free at Last", written and performed by Al Green.
  - "Fone (Intro)" samples the song "That Is Why You're Overweight", written by Eddie Harris, Yvonne Harris and Sara Harris, and performed by Eddie Harris.
  - "Estilo Cachorro" samples the song "Am I Black Enough for You?", written by Kenny Gamble and Leon Huff, and performed by Billy Paul.
  - "Vida Loka, Pt. 2" samples the songs "Theme from Kiss of Blood", written and performed by The Button-Down Brass featuring The Funky Trumpet of Ray Davies; and "Programado pra Morre", written and performed by Trilha Sonora do Gueto.
  - "Expresso da Meia-Noite" samples the song "Pânico Na Zona Sul", written by Mano Brown and performed by Racionais MC's.
  - "Trutas e Quebradas" samples the songs "Soon I'll Be Loving You Again", written by Arthur "T-Boy" Ross, Marvin Gaye and Leon Ware, and performed by Marvin Gaye; and "Minnie's Lament", written by Minnie Riperton and Richard Rudolph, and performed by Minnie Riperton.
  - "Da Ponte pra Cá" samples the songs "Onda", written by Cassiano and Paulo Zdanowski, and performed by Cassiano; and "Cusswords", written and performed by Too $hort.

== Reception ==
Professional ratings
Review scores
Source	Rating
AllMusic	3.5/5 stars
Clique Music	3/5 stars

Matt Rinaldi from AllMusic gave the album three and a half stars out of five writing that "As far as unflinching, reality-based hip-hop goes, it doesn't get much more compelling than Nada Como um Dia Após o Outro Dia". He also commented that the group "stand as a strong counterpoint to the vast majority of MPB artists known mostly for their laid-back grooves and infectious, feel-good choruses". Marco Antonio Barbosa from Clique Music gave the album a more mixed review rating it three out of five stars, writing that it was "derivative" at times. Despite this, he also wrote that the album "reaffirms the importance of Racionais not only for hip hop, but for Brazilian pop as a whole".

The album has been considered as influential as well as important within both Racionais' career and the hip-hop scene in Brazil. KL Jay said in an interview that while Sobrevivendo no Inferno is a classic album, Nada Como um Dia Após o Outro Dia was the responsible for the consolidation of their career as a group. Likewise, Mano Brown said that "I think it is the best album, it went from A to Z within the ideas of the hood, what is really respectable, really true, what will remain forever". Additionally, Black music specialist Amailton Magno de Azevedo considered that the album also consolidated the national rap scene of the time with "political rap". In 2007, the album was included in Rolling Stone's list for "100 Greatest Brazilian Music Records", being placed at number eighty-eight. It was one of two albums by the group to appear in the list, the other being Sobrevivendo no Inferno, which was placed at number fourteen.

At the Prêmios Hutúz, Brazilian hip-hop's main awards show, the album won Album of the Year in 2002 while in 2009, it was recognized as one of the best albums of the decade alongside Provérbios 13 by 509-E, Declaração de Guerra by MV Bill and Dos Barracos de Madeirite... Aos Palácios de Platina by Realidade Cruel.

=== All-time lists ===
Publication	Country	List	Year	Rank	Ref.
Rolling Stone	Brazil	100 Greatest Brazilian Music Records	2007	88	

== Credits ==
- Racionais MC's – producer
  - Mano Brown – vocals, songwriting
  - Ice Blue – vocals, songwriting
  - Edi Rock – vocals, songwriting
  - KL Jay – vocals, songwriting
- Daniel Ganjaman – recording engineer, technical direction
- Gustavo Lenza – recording engineer
- Tejo – recording engineer
- Ricardo Garcia – mastering
- Zé Gonzales – technical direction
- Giuliano Cesar – art direction
- Marco Venicio – photography
- Klaus Mitteldorf – photography

== Certifications ==
Certifications for "Nada Como um Dia Após o Outro Dia, Vol. 1 & 2"
Region	Certification	Certified units/sales
Brazil (Pro-Música Brasil)	Platinum	250,000^{‡}
^{‡} Sales+streaming figures based on certification alone.
