= Eduardo (rapper) =

Musical artist (born 1975)

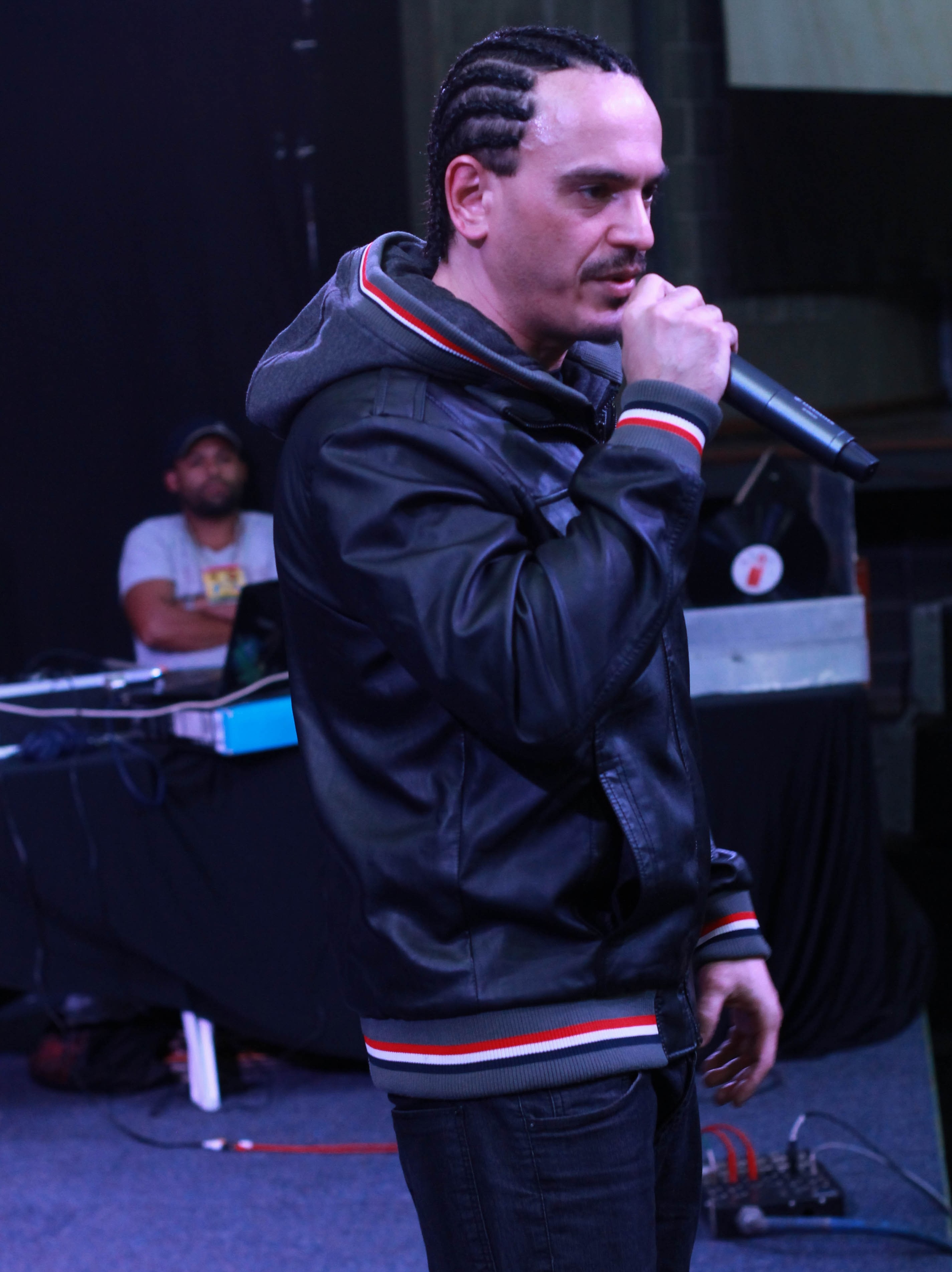
- Eduardo in 2014

Background information
- Also known as: Eduardo
- Born: August 24, 1975 (age 50); São Paulo, Brazil
- Genres: Hip hop; gangsta rap; horrorcore; political hip hop
- Occupations: Rapper; songwriter; activist; educator; writer
- Years active: 1989–present

Carlos Eduardo Taddeo (born August 24, 1975), better known as Eduardo, is a Brazilian rapper, songwriter, activist, educator, and writer.

He is one of the founders and leaders of the Facção Central group, in which he was a vocalist and composer of all lyrics. He left the group on March 18, 2013. Eduardo influenced his musical career by his brother-in-law known as Equipado, who was his sister's boyfriend. Eduardo lectures throughout Brazil and periodically visits the Casa Foundation. Despite not having completed his elementary school, he encourages young people from the periphery to study in interviews, shows and lectures, saying that "having a diploma and being well informed is more audacious than carrying machine guns." In 2012, he launched A Guerra não Declarada na Visão de um Favelado, his first book.

Eduardo (composer and performer) and Dum-Dum (performer) were born and grew up in favelas of São Paulo in an environment where social violence, criminality, drug trafficking and drug addiction were rampant. This violent past became a source of inspiration to Eduardo's political lyrics.

Still in 1989, he founded rap group Facção Central together with Nego (currently known as Rapper Mag) and Jurandir, the last two members left the group, while Garga and Dum-Dum joined Eduardo and started the group's activities. He remained as leader and main composer of the group's lyrics until March 18, 2013, when Eduardo officially communicated in a video that was posted on Youtube announcing his departure from the group due to some personal disagreements and ideological differences.

Recently he released a new single; "Conzpirasom" that was composed by rappers Kaskão (Trilha Sonora do Gueto) and by the writer Ferréz, in partnership with the designer and illustrator Alexandre De Maio.

On December 20, 2014 he announced his pre-release album A Fantástica Fábrica de Cadáver with the participation of artists such as Yzalú, A286, Dexter and Trilha Sonora do Gueto.

== Discography ==
=== Solo ===
- A Fantástica Fábrica de Cadáver (2014)
- O Necrotério dos Vivos (2020)

=== With Facção Central group ===
- Juventude de Atitude (1994)
- Estamos de Luto (1998)
- Versos Sangrentos (1999)
- A Marcha Fúnebre Prossegue (2000)
- Direto do Campo de Extermínio (2003)
- O Espetáculo do Circo dos Horrores (2005)

== Bibliography ==
- A Guerra não Declarada na Visão de um Favelado(2008–2016)
