= 2004 MTV Video Music Brazil =

Award ceremony

- Date: 5 October 2004
- Location: Anhembi Convention Center, São Paulo, São Paulo
- Country: Brazil
- Hosted by: Selton Mello
- Most awards: Marcelo D2 (3)
- Most nominations: Marcelo D2 and O Rappa (6 each)

Television/radio coverage
- Network: MTV Brasil

The 2004 MTV Video Music Brazil was held on 5 October 2004, at the Anhembi Convention Center in São Paulo, honoring the best Brazilian music videos. The ceremony was hosted by actor Selton Mello.

== Winners and nominees ==
The nominees were announced on 5 August 2004. Winners are listed first and highlighted in bold.

Video of the Year	Viewer's Choice
**Marcelo D2 – "Loadeando"**; O Rappa – "O Salto"; Pitty – "Equalize"; Sandy & Junior – "Desperdiçou"; Skank – "Vou Deixar"	**Pitty – "Admirável Chip Novo"**; Br'oZ – "Prometida"; Capital Inicial – "Sem Cansar"; Catedral – "Quem Disse Que o Amor Pode Acabar"; Charlie Brown Jr. – "Vícios e Virtudes"; CPM 22 – "Ontem"; Detonautas – "Olhos Certos"; Felipe Dylon – "Musa do Verão"; Frejat – "Túnel do Tempo"; Ira! – "O Girassol"; Jay Vaquer – "Pode Agradecer"; Jota Quest – "Mais Uma Vez"; Ludov – "Princesa"; Marcelo D2 – "Loadeando"; O Rappa – "Reza Vela"; Planta & Raiz – "A Dois Passos do Paraíso"; Rouge – "Blá Blá Blá"; Sandy & Junior – "Desperdiçou"; Skank – "Vou Deixar"; Titãs – "Provas de Amor"
Best New Artist	Best Pop Video
**Dead Fish – "Zero e Um"**; Br'oZ – "Prometida"; Gram – "Você Pode Ir na Janela"; Ludov – "Princesa"; Matanza – "Pé na Porta, Soco na Cara"	**Skank – "Vou Deixar"**; Arnaldo Antunes – "Consumado"; Jota Quest – "Mais Uma Vez"; Nando Reis – "Luz dos Olhos"; Sandy & Junior – "Desperdiçou"
Best MPB Video	Best Rock Video
**Seu Jorge – "Tive Razão"**; Lucas Santtana – "Samba Cubano"; Otto – "Só pra Ser Minha Mulher"; Wilson Simoninha – "Lá Vem o Homem"; Zezé Di Camargo & Luciano – "Para Mudar Minha Vida"	**Pitty – "Equalize"**; Capital Inicial – "Sem Cansar"; O Rappa – "O Salto"; Sepultura – "Mindwar"; Titãs – "Eu Não Sou um Bom Lugar"
Best Rap Video	Best Electronic Video
**Marcelo D2 – "Loadeando"**; Pentágono – "Na Mora"; Racionais MC's – "Vida Loka II"; Trilha Sonora do Gueto – "Um Pião di Vida Loka"; Veiga e Salazar – "Eléctriko"	**Marcelinho da Lua and Seu Jorge – "Cotidiano"**; DJ Mau Mau – "Space Fun"; Flu – "Vinet San"; Gabriel Musak – "Estética Terceiro Mundo"; Sonic Jr. – "A Casa da Madame"
Best International Video	Best Independent Video
**Linkin Park – "Numb"**; Avril Lavigne – "Don't Tell Me"; Beyoncé featuring Sean Paul – "Baby Boy"; Black Eyed Peas – "Shut Up"; Blink-182 – "Feeling This"; Britney Spears featuring Madonna – "Me Against the Music"; the Calling – "Our Lives"; Christina Aguilera – "The Voice Within"; D12 – "My Band"; Evanescence – "My Immortal"; Good Charlotte – "Hold On"; Incubus – "Megalomaniac"; Limp Bizkit – "Behind Blue Eyes"; Metallica – "The Unnamed Feeling"; Nickelback – "Someday"; Nightwish – "Nemo"; the Offspring – "Hit That"; Outkast – "Hey Ya!"; Red Hot Chili Peppers – "Fortune Faded"; Santana featuring Alex Band – "Why Don't You & I"	**Ludov – "Princesa"**; Bonsucesso Samba Clube – "Pensei Se Há"; Lava – "Igloo"; Rock Rocket – "Por um Rock 'n' Roll Mais Alcoolatra e Inconsequente"; Wander Wildner – "Eu Não Consigo Ser Alegre o Tempo Inteiro"
Best Artist Website	Best Direction in a Video
**Detonautas (www.detonautas.com.br)**; Dibob (www.dibob.com.br); Los Hermanos (www.loshermanos.com.br); Paulo Miklos (www.paulomiklos.com.br); Rita Lee (www.ritalee.com.br)	**O Rappa – "O Salto" (Directors: Bruno Murtinho and Sérgio Schmid)**; Arnaldo Antunes – "Consumado" (Director: Monique Gardenberg); Los Hermanos – "O Vencedor" (Director: Leonardo Domingues); Marcelo D2 – "Loadeando" (Director: Johnny Araújo); Nando Reis – "Luz dos Olhos" (Directors: Vítor Amati, Cássio Amarante and Oswaldo Sant'Ana)
Best Art Direction in a Video	Best Editing in a Video
**Elza Soares – "Rio de Janeiro" (Art Directors: Rodrigo Araújo, Olavo Ekman and Maurício Brandão)**; Bidê ou Balde – "As Cores Bonitas" (Art Director: Rafael Granpá); Marcelo D2 – "Vai Vendo" (Art Directors: Maurício Eça and Flip); Pitty – "Equalize" (Art Director: Marcos Carvalheiro); Skank – "Vou Deixar" (Art Director: Marcelo Presotto)	**O Rappa – "O Salto" (Editor: Pedro Amorim)**; Los Hermanos – "O Vencedor" (Editors: Júlia Martins and Renzo Machado); Nando Reis – "Luz dos Olhos" (Editor: Oswaldo Sant'ana); Sandy & Junior – "Desperdiçou" (Editor: Picky Talarico); Sepultura – "Mindwar" (Editor: Márcio Soares)
Best Photography in a Video
**Marcelo D2 – "Loadeando" (Director of Photography: Marcelo Corpani)**; Pitty – "Equalize" (Director of Photography: Marcelo Corpani); Racionais MC's – "Vida Loka II" (Director of Photography: Paulo Vainer); O Rappa – "Reza Vela" (Director of Photography: Mauro Pinheiro); Sepultura – "Mindwar" (Directors of Photography: Ricardo Della Rosa, João Itaboraí and Sérgio Isidoro)
