= Vida Loka II =

2002 song by Racionais MC's

Song by Racionais MC's

from the album Nada Como um Dia Após o Outro Dia
- Released: 2002
- Recorded: 2002
- Genre: Hip Hop
- Length: 5:03
- Label: Zimbabwe Records
- Songwriter(s): Mano Brown

Racionais MC's singles chronology
"Vida Loka I" (2002)	"Vida Loka II" (2002)	"Negro Drama" (2002)

Music video
- "Vida Loka II" on YouTube

"Vida Loka II" (Portuguese for "Crazy Life II") is a song by the Brazilian hip hop group Racionais MC's. It was included on the album Nada Como um Dia Após o Outro Dia in 2002. "Part 1" of the song was also released on the album.

== Song ==
"Vida Loka II" was originally released as the seventh song on the second disc ("Ri Depois", in English "Laugh Later") of the album Nada Como um Dia Após o Outro Dia. A live version appears on the DVD 1000 Trutas, 1000 Tretas.

This song used samples of the song "Theme from Kiss of Blood", by the band The Button Down Brass with participation by the trumpet player Ray Davies.

== Accolades ==
Awards and nominations for "Vida Loka II"
Organization	Year	Category	Result	Ref.
MTV Video Music Brasil	2004	Videoclipe de Rap	Nominated	
MTV Video Music Brasil	2004	Fotografia em Videoclipe	Nominated	
Prêmio Hutúz	2004	Melhor Videoclipe	Won	
Prêmio Hutúz	2009	Melhores Videoclipes da Década	Won	
