= 2002 MTV Video Music Brazil =

Award ceremony

- Date: 22 August 2002
- Location: Credicard Hall, São Paulo, São Paulo
- Country: Brazil
- Hosted by: Fernanda Lima
- Most awards: Titãs (3)
- Most nominations: Charlie Brown Jr. O Rappa (5 each)

Television/radio coverage
- Network: MTV Brasil

The 2002 MTV Video Music Brazil was held on 22 August 2002, at the Credicard Hall in São Paulo, honoring the best Brazilian music videos. The ceremony was hosted by Fernanda Lima.

== Winners and nominees ==
The nominees were announced on 20 June 2002. Winners are listed first and highlighted in bold.

Video of the Year	Viewer's Choice
**Titãs – "Epitáfio"**; Charlie Brown Jr. – "Hoje Eu Acordei Feliz"; Frejat – "Segredos"; MV Bill – "Só Deus Pode Me Julgar"; O Rappa – "Instinto Coletivo"	**Titãs – "Epitáfio"**; Arnaldo Antunes – "Essa Mulher"; Capital Inicial – "A Sua Maneira"; Charlie Brown Jr. – "Hoje Eu Acordei Feliz"; Cidade Negra – "Girassol"; CPM 22 – "Tarde de Outubro"; Engenheiros do Hawaii – "3^{a} do Plural"; Kelly Key – "Baba"; KLB – "Olhar 43"; Raimundos – "Sanidade"; O Rappa – "Instinto Coletivo"; Rodox – "Olhos Abertos"; Sandy & Junior – "O Amor Faz"; Skank – "Tanto"; Supla – "Garota de Berlim"; O Surto – "O Veneno"; Xis – "Chapa o Coco"
Best New Artist	Best Pop Video
**CPM 22 – "Tarde de Outubro"**; Kelly Key – "Baba"; Mart'nália – "Pé do Meu Samba"; Sabotage – "Um Bom Lugar"; Textículos de Mary e a Banda d'as Cachorra – "Propóstata"	**Frejat – "Segredos"**; Jota Quest – "Na Moral"; Lulu Santos – "Todo Universo"; Nando Reis – "Eu e Ela"; Otto – "Pelo Engarrafamento"
Best MPB Video	Best Rock Video
**Zeca Pagodinho – "Deixa a Vida Me Levar"**; Caetano Veloso and Jorge Mautner – "Todo Errado"; Djavan – "Farinha"; Falamansa – "Xote da Alegria"; Lenine – "O Homem dos Olhos de Raio X"	**Titãs – "Epitáfio"**; Charlie Brown Jr. – "Hoje Eu Acordei Feliz"; CPM 22 – "Tarde de Outubro"; O Rappa – "Instinto Coletivo"; Rodox – "Olhos Abertos"
Best Rap Video	Best Electronic Video
**Xis – "Chapa o Côco"**; MV Bill – "Só Deus Pode Me Julgar"; Nega Gizza – "Prostituta"; Rappin' Hood – "Suburbano"; Sabotage – "Um Bom Lugar"	**2Freakz – "Station"**; Anderson Noise – "Copacabana"; Autoload – "Evite Atrasos"; Ramilson Maia – "Feriado"
Best International Video	Best Demo Video
**Linkin Park – "In the End"**; Aerosmith – "Fly Away from Here"; Alanis Morissette – "Hands Clean"; Backstreet Boys – "Drowning"; Britney Spears – "I'm a Slave 4 U"; Creed – "My Sacrifice"; Gorillaz – "19-2000"; N'Sync – "Pop"; Nickelback – "How You Remind Me"; The Strokes – "Last Nite"	**Ratos de Porão – "Agressão/Repressão"**; Afonjah – "João Cândido"; Blind Pigs – "Amanhã Não Vai Mudar"; Irmãos Rocha! – "Meteoro 37/Ugabugababy"; Lest3r – "Gag"
Best Artist Website	Best Direction in a Video
**Comunidade Nin-Jitsu (www.comunidadeninjitsu.com.br)**; Ivete Sangalo (www.ivetesangalo.com.br); Pedro Luís e a Parede (www.plap.com.br); Rappin' Hood (www.trama.com.br/rappinhood); Rita Lee (www.ritalee.com.br)	**O Rappa – "Instinto Coletivo" (Director: Jarbas Agnelli)**; AfroReggae – "Conflitos Urbanos" (Director: Mauro Lima); Caetano Veloso and Jorge Mautner – "Todo Errado" (Director: Mauro Lima); Charlie Brown Jr. – "Hoje Eu Acordei Feliz" (Director: André Abujamra); Titãs – "Epitáfio" (Directors: Oscar Rodrigues Alves and Francisco Rodrigues Alves)
Best Art Direction in a Video	Best Editing in a Video
**O Rappa – "Instinto Coletivo" (Art Director: Jarbas Agnelli)**; Charlie Brown Jr. – "Hoje Eu Acordei Feliz" (Art Director: Beto Grimaldi); Frejat – "Segredos" (Art Directors: Maurício Vidal, Renan de Moraes and Leo Santos); Ira! – "Entre Seus Rins" (Art Director: Companhia Bonecos Urbanos); Rodox – "Dia Quente" (Art Directors: Eduardo Kurt and Daniel Og)	**Gabriel, o Pensador – "Tem Alguém Aí?" (Editors: Oscar Rodrigues Alves and Rogério Ferreira Alves)**; AfroReggae – "Conflitos Urbanos" (Editors: Mauro Lima and Hugo Gurgel); CPM 22 – "Regina Let's Go" (Editor: Tony Tiger); MV Bill – "Só Deus Pode Me Julgar" (Editors: Mauro Lima, Hugo Gurgel and Domenico Lancelotti); Xis – "Chapa o Côco" (Editors: Toni de Marco and Rafael Coutinho)
Best Photography in a Video
**Caetano Veloso and Jorge Mautner – "Todo Errado" (Director of Photography: Uli Burtin)**; Kid Abelha – "Eu Não Esqueço Nada" (Director of Photography: Feijão); Lenine – "O Homem dos Olhos de Raio X" (Director of Photography: Adriano Goldman); Los Hermanos – "Todo Carnaval Tem Seu Fim" (Director of Photography: Roberio Braga); Ritchie – "Lágrimas Demais" (Director of Photography: Uli Burtin)
