= MTV Video Music Brazil for Best International Video =

- Country: Brazil
- Presented by: MTV Brasil
- First award: 2002
- Final award: 2012
- Currently held by: One Direction (2012)

Highlights
- Most awards: Linkin Park (3)
- Most nominations: Britney Spears (7)

The MTV Video Music Brazil for Best International Video was first awarded at the 2002 MTV Video Music Brazil. In 2007, the word "Video" was removed from the names of all genre categories, changing this award to International Artist of the Year, and the nominees were based on the artists, instead of music videos. Linkin Park is the biggest winner in this category with three wins. Britney Spears is the most nominated artist with seven.

== Recipients ==
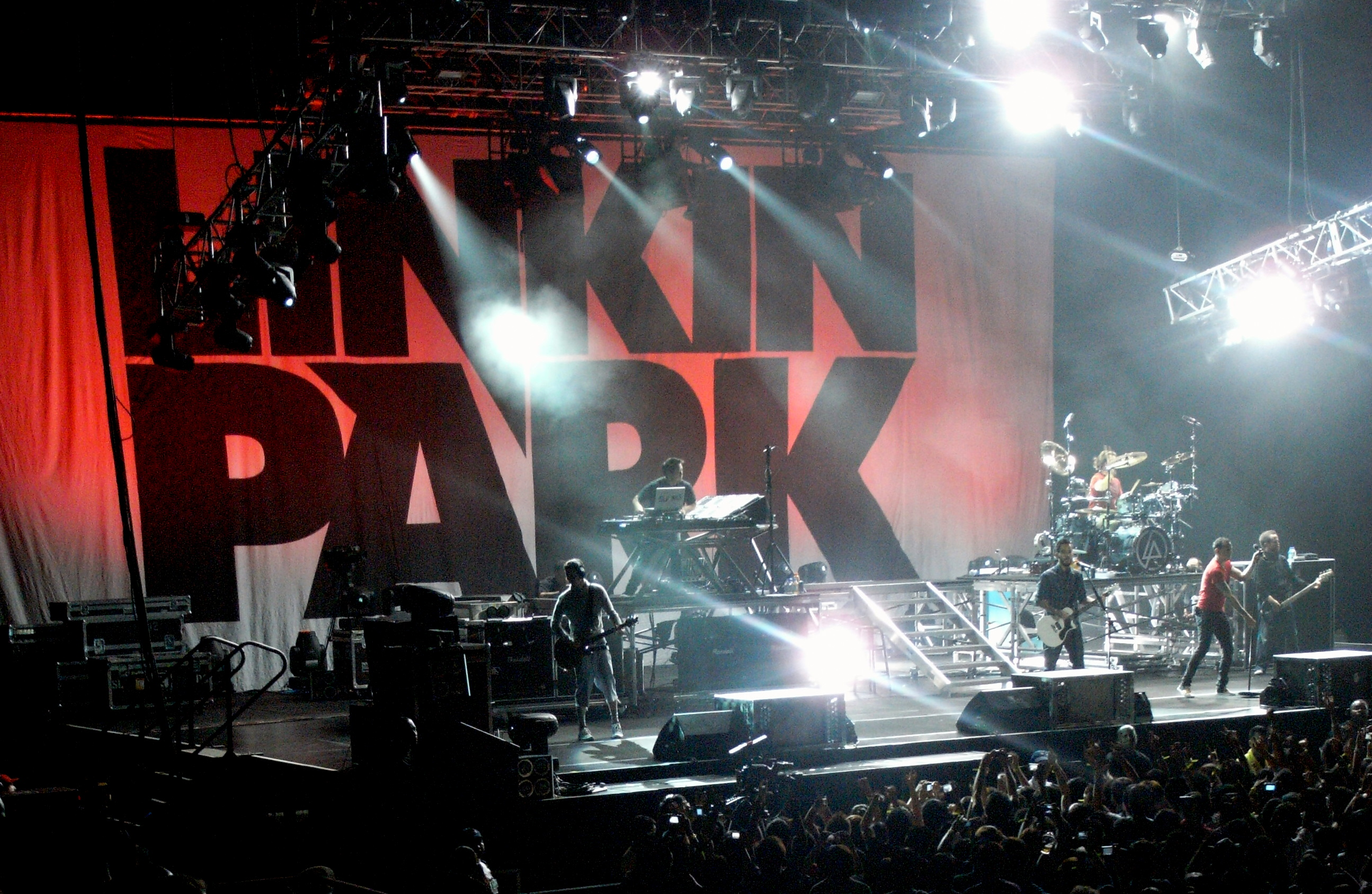
The inaugural winner Linkin Park won the award three years in a row

Recipients
Year	Winner(s)	Nominees	Ref.
2002	"In the End" – Linkin Park	"Fly Away from Here" – Aerosmith; "Hands Clean" – Alanis Morissette; "Drowning" – Backstreet Boys; "I'm a Slave 4 U" – Britney Spears; "My Sacrifice" – Creed; "19-2000" – Gorillaz; "Pop" – N'Sync; "How You Remind Me" – Nickelback; "Last Nite" – The Strokes	
2003	"Somewhere I Belong" – Linkin Park	"Complicated" – Avril Lavigne; "Wherever You Will Go" – the Calling; "Dirrty" – Christina Aguilera featuring Redman; "Don't Stop Dancing" – Creed; "Without Me" – Eminem; "Papa Don't Preach" – Kelly Osbourne; "Boy (I Need You)" – Mariah Carey; "Dilemma" – Nelly featuring Kelly Rowland; "Do I Have to Cry for You?" – Nick Carter; "By the Way" – Red Hot Chili Peppers; "All the Things She Said" – t.A.T.u.	
2004	"Numb" – Linkin Park	"Don't Tell Me" – Avril Lavigne; "Baby Boy" – Beyoncé featuring Sean Paul; "Shut Up" – Black Eyed Peas; "Feeling This" – Blink-182; "Me Against the Music" – Britney Spears featuring Madonna; "Our Lives" – the Calling; "The Voice Within" – Christina Aguilera; "My Band" – D12; "My Immortal" – Evanescence; "Hold On" – Good Charlotte; "Megalomaniac" – Incubus; "Behind Blue Eyes" – Limp Bizkit; "The Unnamed Feeling" – Metallica; "Someday" – Nickelback; "Nemo" – Nightwish; "Hit That" – the Offspring; "Hey Ya!" – Outkast; "Fortune Faded" – Red Hot Chili Peppers; "Why Don't You & I" – Santana featuring Alex Band	
2005	"B.Y.O.B." – System of a Down	"He Wasn't" – Avril Lavigne; "Incomplete" – Backstreet Boys; "Do Somethin'" – Britney Spears; "Lose My Breath" – Destiny's Child; "Boulevard of Broken Dreams" – Green Day; "I Just Wanna Live" – Good Charlotte; "Penny & Me" – Hanson; "Jigga What, Jigga Who / Faint" – Linkin Park & Jay-Z; "This Love" – Maroon 5	
2006	"Pump It" – Black Eyed Peas	"Jesus of Suburbia" – Green Day; "Hung Up" – Madonna; "Photograph" – Nickelback; "Perfect" – Simple Plan	
2007	Red Hot Chili Peppers	Amy Winehouse; Arctic Monkeys; Britney Spears; Fall Out Boy; Fergie; Justin Timberlake; Lily Allen; My Chemical Romance; Panic! at the Disco; The White Stripes	
2008	Paramore	Amy Winehouse; Britney Spears; Coldplay; Justice; Kanye West; Katy Perry; Madonna; MGMT; Radiohead	
2009	Britney Spears	Arctic Monkeys; Beyoncé; Black Eyed Peas; Franz Ferdinand; Green Day; Katy Perry; Kings of Leon; Lady Gaga; Lily Allen	
2010	Justin Bieber	Beyoncé; Black Eyed Peas; Green Day; Jay-Z; Katy Perry; Ke$ha; Lady Gaga; Paramore; Tokio Hotel	
2011	Lady Gaga	Adele; Arcade Fire; Beastie Boys; Beyoncé; Britney Spears; Foo Fighters; Kanye West; Katy Perry; the Strokes	
2012	One Direction	Demi Lovato; Jay-Z & Kanye West; Justin Bieber; Katy Perry; Lana Del Rey; Maroon 5; Nicki Minaj; Rihanna; Taylor Swift	

== Statistics ==
=== Artists with multiple wins ===
3 wins

- Linkin Park

=== Artists with multiple nominations ===
7 nominations

- Britney Spears

5 nominations

- Katy Perry

4 nominations

- Beyoncé
- Black Eyed Peas
- Green Day
- Linkin Park

3 nominations

- Avril Lavigne
- Jay-Z
- Kanye West
- Lady Gaga
- Madonna
- Nickelback
- Red Hot Chili Peppers

2 nominations

- Amy Winehouse
- Arctic Monkeys
- Backstreet Boys
- Creed
- Christina Aguilera
- Good Charlotte
- Justin Bieber
- Lily Allen
- Paramore
- the Calling
- the Strokes
