= A Fantástica Fábrica de Cadáver =

Studio album by Eduardo
- Released: December 20, 2014
- Recorded: 2013–2014
- Venue: Clube de Regatas do Flamengo. Stadium, Arena & Sports Venue.
- Genre: Hip hop; Political hip hop; gangsta rap; horrorcore; Rap
- Length: 1:15:44
- Label: Tratore
- Producer: DJ Luiz Só Monstro, Eduardo Taddeo & Erick 12

A Fantástica Fábrica de Cadáver (The Fantastic Corpse Factory) is the debut album by Brazilian rapper Eduardo, the album was released on December 20, 2014, with double format and contains 32 tracks. Rolling Stone magazine highlighted the unpublished song "A Fantástica Fábrica de Cadáver", which reached 14th place. The album was in 6th place as one of the best albums of the year 2014.

== Track listing ==
A Fantástica Fábrica de Cadáver (1)
No.	Title	Length
1.	"A Linha de Produção"	3:09
2.	"A Fantástica Fábrica de Cadáver"	4:22
3.	"Depósito dos Rejeitados"	5:20
4.	"Substância Venenosa"	5:00
5.	"Don Corleone do Gueto"	5:09
6.	"Sentença Capital"	4:55
7.	"Aprendendo com os Corpos Desfigurados" (featuring. Yzalú)	4:49
8.	"Dossiê"	4:54
9.	"A Era das Chacinas"	5:19
10.	"A Mão Que Assalta o Berço"	5:42
11.	"As Vozes da Estatística"	4:54
12.	"Regime Disciplinar Diferenciado"	4:54
13.	"Transe Hipnótico"	4:35
14.	"Manicômio Judiciário"	4:39
15.	"De Homem para Homem"	4:18
16.	"O Fugitivo"	3:52

A Fantástica Fábrica de Cadáver (2)
No.	Title	Length
1.	"A Mesa de Autópsia"	4:38
2.	"Império dos Ossos"	3:48
3.	"Entre o Paraíso e o Purgatório"	5:20
4.	"Os Cravos do Holocausto"	4:35
5.	"Playground do Diabo"	5:16
6.	"Não Existem Civis"	4:55
7.	"Eu Acredito"	5:21
8.	"Buscando o Que é Meu Por Direito"	4:34
9.	"Paz Impossível"	4:00
10.	"1000 Graus Centigrados"	5:42
11.	"Endereçado a Sociedade"	4:54
12.	"Banco dos Réus"	4:54
13.	"Recaída"	4:35
14.	"Por Trás do Cartão Postal"	4:39
15.	"O Preço da Traíção"	4:18
16.	"Recomeçar"	3:52
Total length:		1:15:44
