= Dexter (singer) =

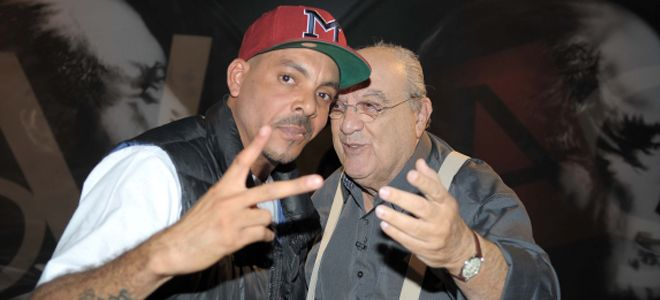
Dexter with host Antônio Abujamra on TV Brasil, 2014.

Marcos Fernandes de Omena (São Paulo, 1973), most known as Dexter, is a Brazilian rapper.

== Career and Imprisonment ==
Along with Afro-X, he formed the group 509-E while he was incarcerated. The first disc was recorded from prison in 2000. After his partner left prison, the two fell out and the group split up. They were arrested for armed robbery, and Dexter spent 13 years in prison. In 2005, he released his first solo album: Exilado Sim, Preso Não, which included guest appearances by Mano Brown of Racionais Mc's, MV Bill and GOG.

Dexter is outspoken about the need for prison reform and education in Brazil, saying in a 2012 interview that "The government invests more in repression than in teaching."

== Discography ==
- 2005 - Exilado Sim, Preso Não
