= 509-E =

- Genres: Hip Hop, Gangsta rap
- Members: Dexter; Afro-X

509-E was a Brazilian rap group formed by Dexter and Afro-X when they were incarcerated in Carandiru Penitentiary. The group dissolved in 2003, and they both launched solo careers.

== Career ==
Dexter and Afro-X met when sharing the same cell in the Carandiru prison. After the launch of their first song, "powder keg" they began to produce new music. In 2000, they released their debut album,Proverbs 13, with guest appearances from Mano Brown, Edy Rock, MV Bill and DJ Hum.

Following an interview on Rede Globo, the pair were targeted by Brazilian authorities for speaking out. After an uprising that resulted in the closure of the Carandiru penitentiary in 2002, the group was banned by the police from playing shows in the street due to their advocacy. After a time, Afro-X won the Freedom 509-E released his second and last work,LL DC (2002 after Christ). The two members began to fall out and the group ended in 2003.

To date, Dexter has released four albums as a solo artist. Afro-X has followed a sporadic career in rap, and gained national attention when he married Simony. He is now an educator.

In 2009, a documentary was released about 509-E, called Between Light and Shadow, directed by Luciana Burlamaqui, focusing on violence in Brazil from the formation of Dexter and Afro-X in Carandiru. On November 14, 2009, te film received first prize in 4 ª Mostra Cinema and Human Rights in South America.

== Discography ==
- Provérbios 13(2000)
- MMII DC (2002 Depois de Cristo) (2002)
