= Sobrevivendo no Inferno =

Studio album by Racionais MC's
- Released: 20 December 1997
- Genres: Political hip-hop; Christian hip-hop
- Length: 60:13
- Label: Cosa Nostra

Racionais MC's chronology
Racionais MC's (1994)	Sobrevivendo no Inferno (1997)	Ao Vivo (2001)

Sobrevivendo no Inferno (Brazilian Portuguese pronunciation: [sobɾeviˈvẽdu nu ĩˈfɛʁnu], in English "Surviving in Hell") is the second studio album of the Brazilian hip-hop group Racionais MC's, released on 20 December 1997. The album was produced during a period of socio-political change in Brazil, as the country transitioned to neoliberal policies after decades of military dictatorship. This era saw a rise in violence, particularly in urban peripheries such as São Paulo, where the group's members grew up. Racionais MC's had been active since 1988 and had already gained recognition with earlier releases.

Its musical style blends influences from funk, Black music, and Brazilian traditions, with production incorporating samples from various genres. The album centers on the experiences of systemic issues like institutional racism, police violence, and social inequality faced by Black and marginalized communities in the country's favelas. Sobrevivendo no Inferno received critical acclaim and achieved commercial success, becoming the best-selling rap album in Brazil.

== Background ==
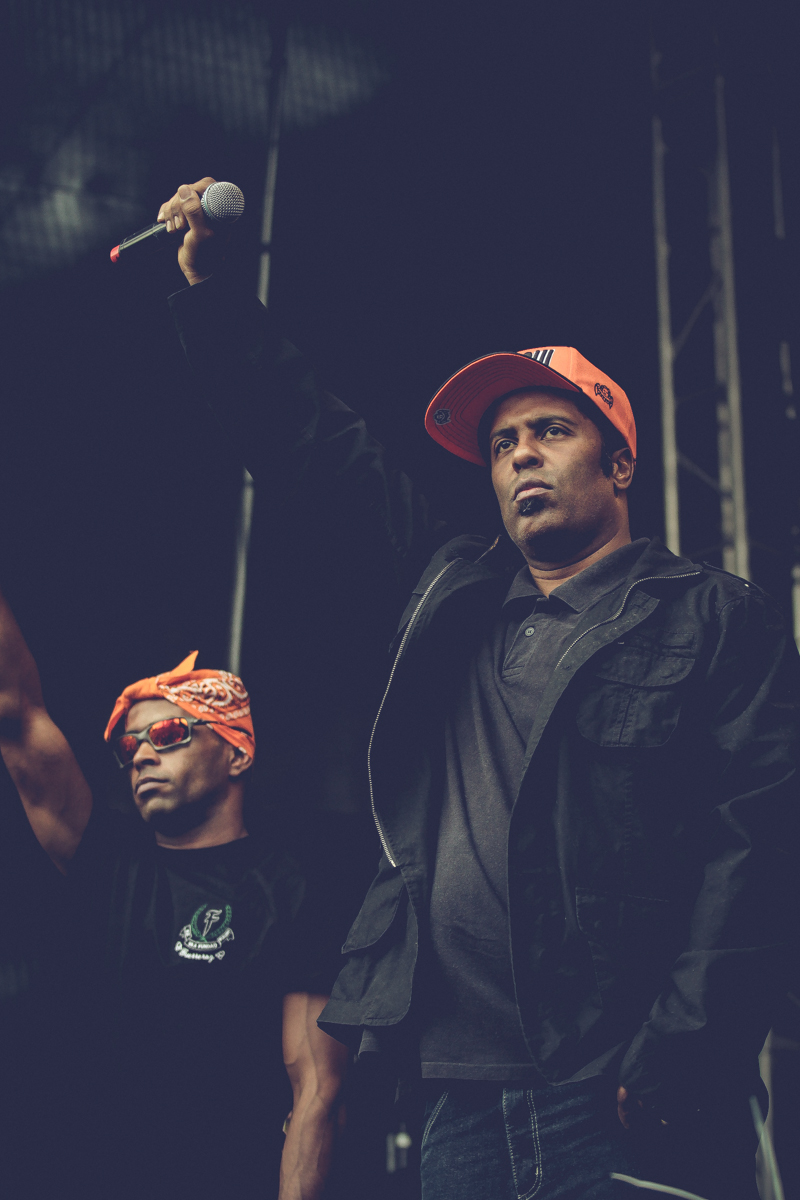
Lead Mano Brown (right) and supporting vocal Edy Rock (left) at a 2013 concert in São Paulo, Brazil.

Racionais MC's had been active since 1988, with members Ice Blue, Mano Brown, Edi Rock, and KL Jay forming the group in São Paulo, Brazil. Their first appearance on record came through the Consciência Black – Vol. 1 compilation, where they introduced "Pânico na Zona Sul" and "Tempos Difíceis". Their early lyrics addressed themes of violence and hardship in the periphery, distinguishing them within the São Paulo black music scene. Racionais MC's released their debut extended play (EP), Holocausto Urbano (1990, lit. 'Urban Holocaust'), which established the group's critical perspective on life in São Paulo's peripheries and on police violence. Their debut studio album, Raio-X do Brasil (1993, lit. 'X-Ray of Brazil'), expanded this social critique, offering a more detailed portrayal of inequalities and injustices faced by marginalized communities, including the experiences of children in underprivileged neighborhoods.

Sobrevivendo no Inferno emerged during a socio-political era marked by Brazil's transition to neoliberalism after decades of military dictatorship in Brazil (1964–1985). During this period, violence intensified in urban peripheries, including São Paulo district Capão Redondo, where Mano Brown grew up. A series of violent events shaped both the social context and the trajectory of Racionais MC's, before the production of Sobrevivendo no Inferno. The Carandiru massacre on 2 October 1992, in which Military Police of São Paulo State's Special Troops killed at least 111 inmates, was one of the defining moments of the period and would later be referenced in the album. Other cases of police violence followed, including the Candelária massacre on 23 July 1993, where officers executed children and teenagers in Rio de Janeiro, and the Vigário Geral massacre on 29 August 1993, in which 21 people were murdered. The inspiration for Sobrevivendo no Inferno came from the brutal realities of life in the periphery, where violence, oppression, and social inequality dictated the daily existence of many. The album channeled the group's ongoing commitment to black consciousness and resistance, refining the themes they had explored since their earliest recordings.

== Production ==
The album title Sobrevivendo no Inferno (lit. 'Surviving in Hell') indicates the idea of survival in a hostile and oppressive environment. "Hell" refers to the favelas, territories where the Black and poor population took refuge during the time of slavery and where this group has been neglected by public policies ever since. The album cover, illustrated by a cross on a black background, presents a transcription from Psalm 23, Chapter 3: "He restoreth my soul; He guideth me on righteous paths for His name's sake". The back cover presents an image of a black man, seen from behind, holding a weapon, along with the transcription of another passage from Psalm 23, Chapter 4: "E mesmo que eu ande no vale da sombra e da morte não temerei mal algum porque tu estás comigo" ('Yea, though I walk through the valley of the shadow of death, I will fear no evil, For Thou art with me; Thy rod and Thy staff, they comfort me'). The cover was conceived by art director Marcos Marques. Originally, the cover intended to display a photo of Racional MC's in front of a church with Edinho, son of former football player Pelé. After the group's rejection to the initial concept, Marques proposed an alternative based on the cross-shaped tattoo on Mano Brown's arm.

During the group's early recordings, the musical backing, comprising rhythmic samples and scratches, conveyed a sense of vitality and movement reminiscent of a dance or street party, even as the lyrics depicted the harsh social realities of life in the urban periphery. Sobrevivendo no Inferno was released independently on 20 December 1997 by independent record label Cosa Nostra, founded by Racionais MC's. The decision to self-publish the album reflected the group's critical posture in relation to the Brazilian phonographic market. Racionais MC's had tense relations with the hegemonic music industry, refusing to grant frequent interviews, accept awards or adhere to conventional media outreach strategies.

== Musical style ==
Music critics have categorized Sobrevivendo no Inferno as a political hip-hop recording, with funk and Black music influences. The album lyrically addresses institutional racism, class inequality, police violence, and the struggles of life in Brazil's urban peripheries during the 1990s, a period marked by neoliberal policies and heightened violence in São Paulo, portraying what journalist Xico Sá described as a "daily genocide" on the peripheries. The album develops a trend present in the previous album, Raio X Brasil (1993), to work with extensive lyrics. Religious symbolism appears throughout the album, reflecting a conflicted spirituality that merges Catholic and Afro-diasporic elements. KL Jay's production incorporates samples from artists such as Isaac Hayes, Sade, Edwin Starr, and Djavan, connecting national rap to African traditions and blending soul, funk and Brazilian influences. Other examples include ambient sounds such as sirens, gunshots, and crying to evoke the chaos of urban life and instrumental elements like wah-wah guitars and horns, creating a dense atmosphere.

=== Track analysis ===
The album's opening track, "Jorge da Capadócia", a composition by Jorge Ben Jor, is conceived as a chant to Ogum, the orixá (divine spirit) of war and iron in Candomblé, an Afro-Brazilian religion. This chant is intended to "shield the body" and provide protection. In Sobrevivendo no Inferno, it begins with the salutation to Ogum: "Ogunhê!". "Gênesis" works as an introductory speech that begins to present the character of rapper Mano Brown. The song contrasts divine creation—credited with positive elements like the sea, trees, children, and love—with the harsh realities imposed by society, which is blamed for negative aspects such as favelas, crack cocaine, betrayal, weapons, alcohol, and prostitution. Mano Brown portrays himself carrying "an old Bible, an automatic pistol / A feeling of revolt", symbolizing a fusion of spirituality, resistance, and survival in the face of systemic violence. "Capítulo 4, Versículo 3" (lit. 'Chapter 4, Verse 3') opens with Primo Preto, one of the album's producers, reciting statistics that highlight the vulnerability of Black populations, followed by Mano Brown adopting a violent narrative voice that initially simulates a criminal act. The lyrics progressively shift from this literal depiction to a metaphorical use of violence, where words become the rapper's "ammunition", exploring the ambivalence of action, morality, and identity.

"Tô Ouvindo Alguém Me Chamar" (lit. 'I Hear Someone Calling Me') is an eleven-minute track narrated in first person that tells the story of Guina, a fictional criminal in São Paulo's periphery, addressing themes like social inequality and crime. The lyrics contrast Guina's path with that of his brother, who follows a conventional life, highlighting moral dilemmas and societal struggles. Throughout the song, a hospital equipment sound resembling a heartbeat gradually accelerates, suggesting the character's death, though the lyrics do not explicitly confirm this outcome. In "Rapaz Comum" (lit. 'Ordinary Boy') the narrator recounts his life from the moment he is shot to his funeral. The lyrics raise questions about the value of life, survival in an unequal world ("law of the jungle"), the normalization of systemic violence and the criminalization of Black and peripheral youth.

". . ." is an instrumental track in the middle of the album, functioning as a reflective and transient break. The lyrics from the track "Diário de um Detento" (lit. 'Diary of an Inmate') report the life of Jocenir Prado, a poet and a survivor of the Carandiru massacre in São Paulo. Jocenir Prado was a poet who, in prison, wrote verses for other detainees to give as a gift to his girlfriends. This story reached Mano Brown as Racionais MC's was encouraged to write about the experiences of those in prison. During a visitation day, seeking inspiration for a new song, Brown approached Prado, co-writing the track. "Periferia é Periferia" (lit. 'Perifery is Perifery') encapsulates the universality of marginalization, advocating for the unity of Brazilian peripheries. "Qual Mentira Vou Acreditar" (lit. 'Which Lie Will I Believe') focuses on veiled racism and the daily situations that the Black population experiences. Police approaches are an example of this. According to research by Datafolha, conducted at the time the lyrics were released, nearly half (48%) of the Black respondents had been searched by police.

"Mágico de Oz" (lit. 'The Wizard of Oz') centers on the life of a marginalized child surviving urban poverty, whose stolen childhood forces premature adulthood. The lyrics depict a cyclical trap where poverty and systemic abandonment push the protagonist toward crime, mirroring the lives of many Brazilian youth in peripheries. In "Fórmula Mágica da Paz" (lit. 'Magic Formula for Peace'), the rappers resume the tradition of explaining or analyzing reality through religion. Peace is depicted as something "mystical", akin to magic, while the lyrics suggest that only through an almost supernatural intervention could the cycle of violence and retribution in marginalized communities be disrupted. The final track "Salve" (lit. 'Greetings') follows the tradition of the American hip-hop of ending albums with greetings and thanks. The track inserts lists of Brazilian municipalities shouted on instrumental loops.

== Critical reception and legacy ==
Professional ratings
Review scores
Source	Rating
AllMusic	2.5/5 stars

The album was met with mostly positive acclaim. Journalist Israel do Vale, from the Brazilian newspaper Folha de S.Paulo, rated the album positively, describing Sobrevivendo no Inferno as a radical progression in the experience of Racionais MC's and stating that the album "radicalizes the experience of Sobrevivendo no Inferno". He noted how the group's music serves as both art and literature, and how it demands the listener's full attention. He emphasized the album's capacity to provoke thought, likening it to a literary work and a cinematic experience. Another contemporary journalist from Folha de S.Paulo, Lucas Brêda, called the album as a "Bible" of Brazilian hip-hop. Don Snowden expressed less enthusiasm in his AllMusic review, giving it two and a half stars out of five and highlighted the album's minimalistic approach and its focus on the stories of favela life, stating that "the music is so minimal" that listeners may struggle to find comfort in the grooves. He wrote that the album "could be the hip-hop soundtrack to the favela world of the film Cidade de Deus".

Despite having been released by an independent record label, the album was commercially successful with the help of word of mouth, selling 150,000 copies in one week after release. By January 1998, it sold 200,000 copies in one month after release, a number that doubled to 500,000 copies in 2004. By 2010, it was estimated that more than 1,500,000 copies had been sold, along with 4,000,000 through piracy, becoming the best-selling rap album in Brazil. The album has received several awards and nominations from publications. It was ranked fourteenth on the 100 Greatest Brazilian music albums of Rolling Stone Brasil magazine, and voted ninth on the 500 Greatest Brazilian music albums of Discoteca Básica podcast. In 2022, it was elected as one of the best Brazilian music albums of the last 40 years by a O Globo poll which involved 25 specialists, including Charles Gavin, Nelson Motta, and others.

In 2018, the album was included by the State University of Campinas (Unicamp) on the list of required readings for its 2020 entrance exam, being the first time a music album has been recommended for this exam. In 31 October 2018, the album became a book written by Racionais MC's published by Companhia das Letras, featuring unpublished photos and information about the group.

== Track listing ==
All tracks are written by Mano Brown, Edi Rock, and Ice Blue except where written.

No.	Title	Writer(s)	Length
1.	"Jorge da Capadócia" (Saint George)	Jorge Ben Jor	2:47
2.	"Gênesis" (Genesis)		0:21
3.	"Capítulo 4, Versículo 3" (Chapter 4, Verse 3)		8:06
4.	"Tô Ouvindo Alguém Me Chamar" (I Hear Someone Calling Me)		11:12
5.	"Rapaz Comum" (Ordinary Boy)		6:19
6.	". . ."		2:33
7.	"Diário de um Detento" (Diary of an Inmate)	Mano Brown, Jocenir Prado	7:31
8.	"Periferia É Periferia" (The Periphery is the Periphery)		5:59
9.	"Qual Mentira Vou Acreditar" (Which Lie Will I Believe)		7:41
10.	"Mágico de Oz" (The Wizard of Oz)		7:36
11.	"Fórmula Mágica da Paz" (Magic Formula for Peace)		10:39
12.	"Salve" (Greetings)		2:16
Total length:			1:13:00

== Personnel ==
According to the album's liner notes.

- Mano Brown – vocals, composer (tracks 2–4, 7, 9, 11, 12)
- Edy Rock – vocals, composer (tracks 5, 6, 8, 10, 12)
- Ice Blue – vocals
- DJ KL Jay – scratches

Additional composers

- Jorge Ben – composer (track 1)
- Jocenir Prado – composer (track 7)

== Certifications ==
Certifications for Sobrevivendo no Inferno
Region	Certification	Certified units/sales
Brazil (Pro-Música Brasil)	Gold	100,000^{‡}
^{^} Shipments figures based on certification alone.

== Bibliography ==
- Garcia, Walter (20 December 2013). "Elementos para a crítica da estética do Racionais MC'S (1990-2006)". Idéias. 4 (2): 81. doi:10.20396/ideias.v4i2.8649382. ISSN 2179-5525.
- Pardue, Derek (2021). Racionais MCs' Sobrevivendo no inferno. 33 1/3 Brazil. New York: Bloomsbury Academic. ISBN 978-1-5013-3887-8.
