= A286 =

Brazilian rap group

- Origin: São Paulo, Brazil
- Genre: Gangsta rap
- Years active: 1997–present
- Members: Ivan; Reinando

A286 is a Brazilian rap group, formed in 1997. They released their first album in 2007, entitled Além do Crime e da Razão.

== History ==
The group was formed in 1997 in the Jardim Noronha neighborhood, in Grajaú, São Paulo, by Moyses, Ivan, Isaack, André and DJ Carlos. Later, the musicians Reinaldo and Paulo joined the group, as well as Erick 12, the former DJ of the group Facção Central. The group has affiliations with Facção Central, as demonstrated in the songs "A um Passo" and "Prepara as Algemas". The member Moysés suffered a car accident in 2007 while returning from the Prêmio Hutúz.

In 2007, A286 released its first album, Além do Crime e da Razão, produced by Erick 12. The album contains 16 tracks, with highlights including "Preparem as Algemas" and "Enquanto Houver Motivo".

In 2010, A286 had the production of the second album signed by Erick 12, who is also the group's DJ. Exército dos Excluídos ("Army of the Excluded") is a heavy rap record, reporting problems faced in the periphery, such as crime, drugs, and police violence.

== Discography ==
=== Studio albums ===
- 2007 – Além do Crime e da Razão
- 2010 – Exército dos Excluídos

== Awards ==
| Year | Award | Category | Ref |
|---|---|---|---|
| 2008 | Prêmio Hutúz | Breakthrough | |
