= Cores & Valores =

Studio album by Racionais MC's
- Released: 2014
- Genre: Hip hop, alternative hip hop
- Label: Cosa Nostra

Cores & Valores is the fourth studio album by Brazilian rap group Racionais MC's, launched in 2014 by record companies Cosa Nostra and Boogie Suit. Unlike previous albums, all marked by several long songs, Colors & Values presents several short and direct raps - the longest track is "The Evil and the Good", with exactly five minutes.

First work with unreleased tracks from Nothing like a day after another day, launched 12 years before, the disc has 15 songs.

The album was recorded at Maraca studio in the city of São Paulo, and finished at the Quad Recording Studios in New York.

On the cover, Mano Brown, Ice Blue, Edy Rock and KL Jay appear wielding weapons, dressed in clothes from garbage collectors and masked. One of the four drag three pouches. While Ice Blue appears wearing a clown mask, the other three rational appear with shades of character Jason Voorhees, the film series Friday 13. The cover photo was made next to a bank that sits at the base of the Copan Building in downtown São Paulo.

It was named best national drive 2014 by Rolling Stone Brazil.

== Tracks ==
1. "Cores & Valores"
2. "Somos o que Somos"
3. "Cores & Valores - Preto e Amarelo"
4. "Trilha"
5. "Preto Zica"
6. "Cores & Valores - Finado Neguin"
7. "Eu Compro"
8. "A Escolha que eu Fiz"
9. "A Praça"
10. "O Mal e o Bem"
11. "Você Me Deve"
12. "Quanto Vale o Show?" (Sample de "Gonna Fly Now" por Bill Conti)
13. "Coração Barrabaz"
14. "Eu Te Proponho"
