= Raio-X do Brasil =

Studio album by Racionais Mc's
- Released: 1993
- Genre: Brazilian hip hop
- Language: Portuguese

Racionais Mc's chronology
Escolha Seu Caminho (1992)	Raio-X do Brasil (1993)	Racionais MC's (1994)

Raio-X do Brasil (X-Ray of Brazil) is the debut album of the Brazilian hip hop group Racionais Mc's, released in 1993.

In 1993, Racionais Mc's were already popular in the outskirts of São Paulo. That year, they recorded their first album, Raio-X do Brasil. The album was released at a party, with an estimated crowd of 10,000 people in the court of the samba school Rosas De Ouro. The most successful songs from this album were 'Fim De Semana No Parque' (Weekend in the Park) and 'Homem Na Estrada' (Man On The Road), both by Mano Brown, which became anthems at hip-hop parties and on radio stations throughout the country. It is considered to be the record that made rap one of the most popular genres in Brazil. According to the DJ of Racionais Mc's, Kl Jay, Raio-X do Brasil sold 200,000 copies.

== Track listing ==
Side A

1. Introdução (Samples Of "T Stands For Trouble" of Marvin Gaye)
2. Fim De Semana No Parque (Samples Of "Domingas" and "Frases" of Jorge Ben Jor)
3. Parte 2 (Samples Of "Cleo's Apartment" of Marvin Gaye)
4. Mano Na Porta Do Bar (Samples Of "Freddie's Dead" of Curtis Mayfield)

Side B

1. Homem Na Estrada (Samples Of "Ela Partiu" of Tim Maia)
2. Júri Racional (Samples Of "Cissy Strut" Of The Meters)
3. Fio Da Navalha (Samples Of "Main Theme From Trouble Man" Of Marvin Gaye)
4. Agradecimentos (Samples Of "Main Theme From Trouble Man" Of Marvin Gaye)
