= Rappin' Hood =

Brazilian rapper (born 1971)

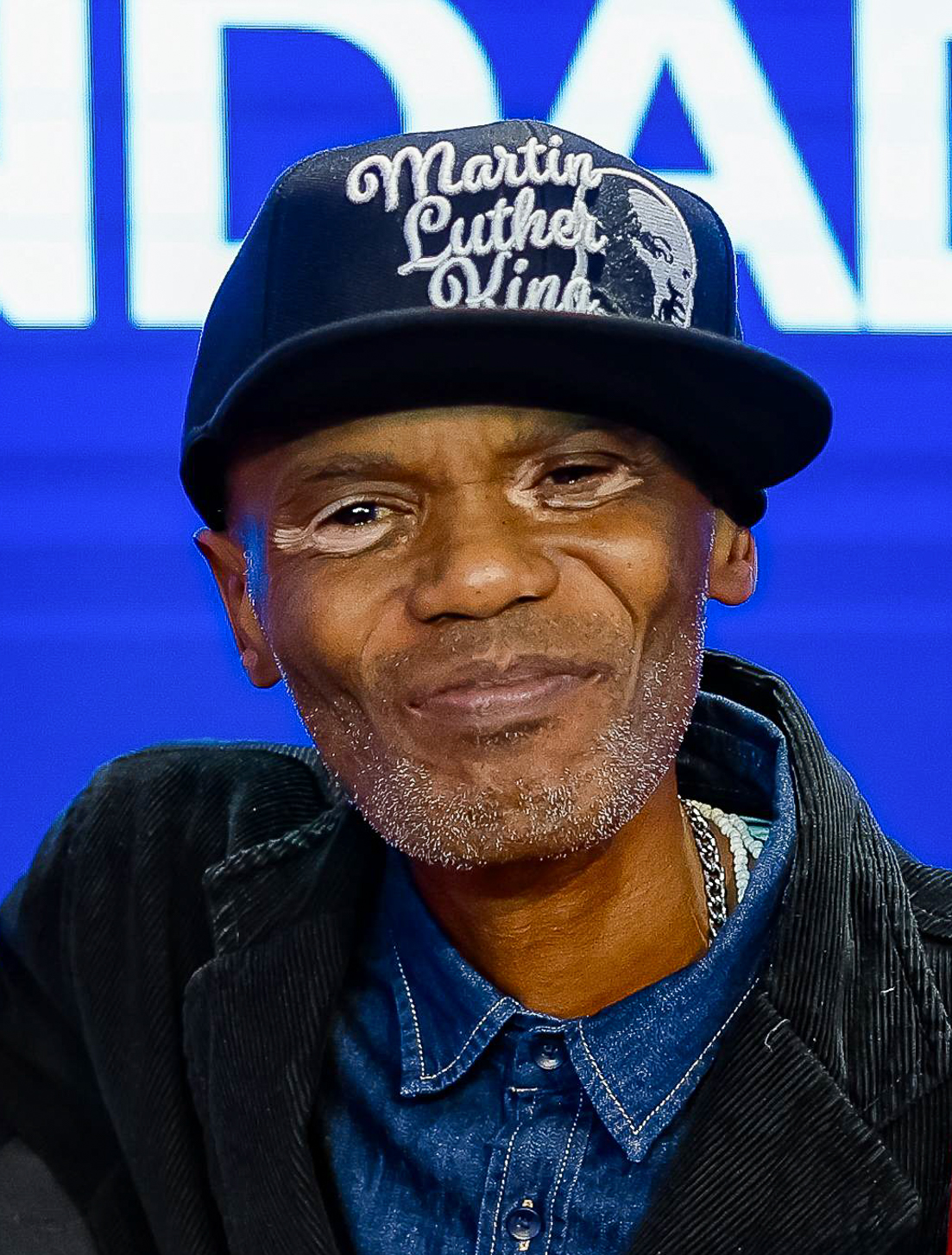
- Rappin' Hood in 2025
- Born: Antônio Luiz Júnior; November 7, 1971 (age 54); São Paulo, Brazil
- Occupations: Rapper; singer; songwriter; record producer; activist; television presenter (former)
- Years active: 1989–present
- Musical career
- Genres: Hip hop, samba-rap
- Instrument: Vocals

Antônio Luiz Júnior (born November 7, 1971), better known by his stage name Rappin' Hood, is a Brazilian rapper, singer, record producer, activist and former television presenter. He is famous for being a pioneer of the samba-rap in the mid- to late 1990s.

== Biography ==
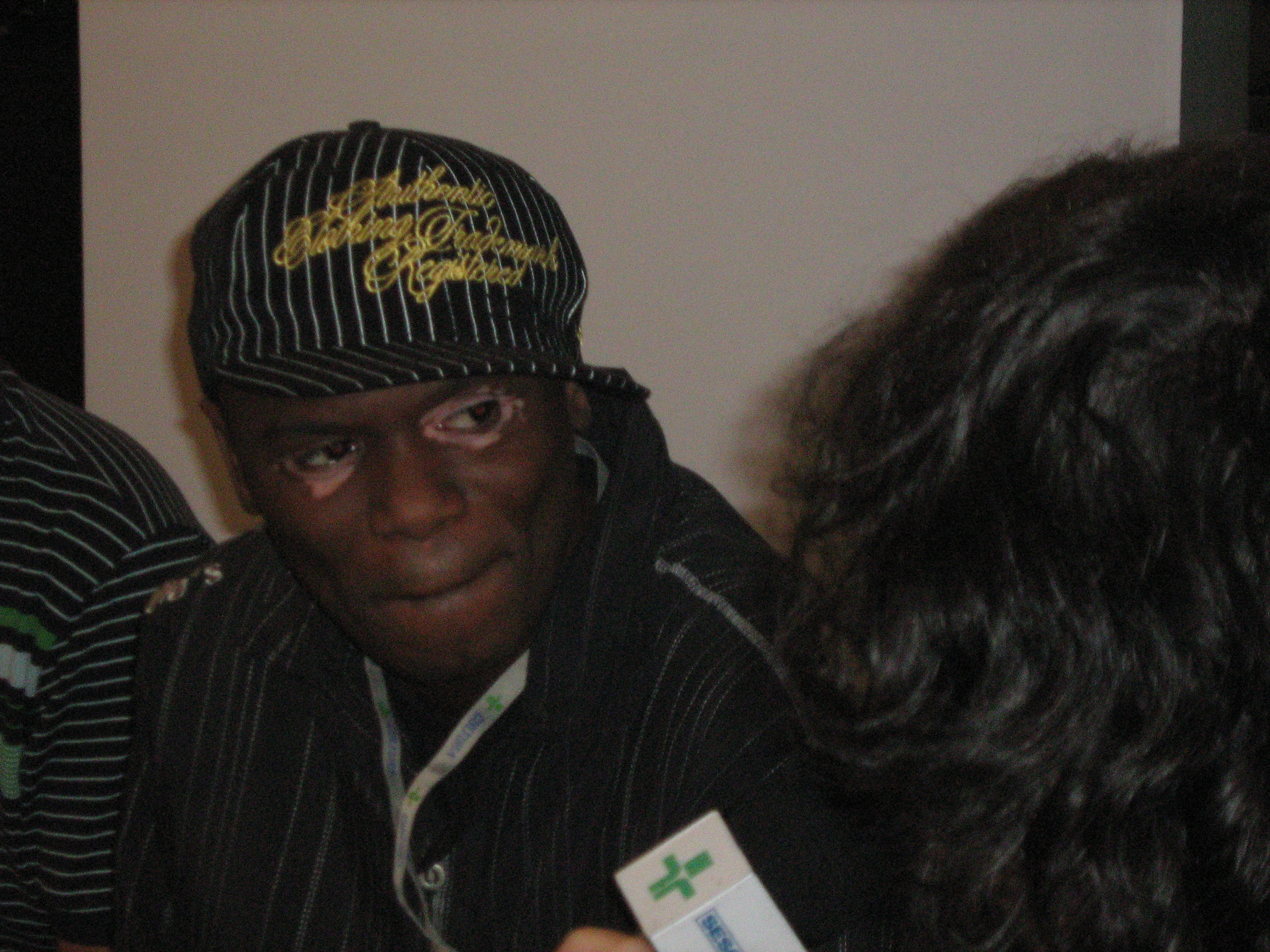
Rappin' Hood in 2007

Antônio Luiz Júnior was born on November 7, 1971, in the bairro of Heliópolis, São Paulo. Diagnosed with vitiligo early in his childhood, he began writing his first songs when he was circa 14 years old, also taking trumpet and cornet lessons. His career as a rapper officially began in 1989, after he won a rap battle, subsequently taking the stage name "Rappin' Hood" as a pun on legendary English outlaw Robin Hood.

In 1992 he formed the group Posse Mente Zulu, or PMZ, recording with them one of the greatest hits of the early Brazilian hip hop scene, "Sou Negrão"; he left PMZ in 2001 to start a solo career with the release of Sujeito Homem through independent label Trama, which was lauded by critics owing to its inventive mix of hip hop and samba. A sequel, Sujeito Homem 2, came out in 2005 and counted with guest appearances of famous musicians such as Caetano Veloso, Jair Rodrigues, Arlindo Cruz, Zélia Duncan, Gilberto Gil and Dudu Nobre. A third installment came out in 2015. Also in 2001 he was a guest musician on Sabotage's debut (and ultimately only release), Rap É Compromisso!.

In 2004 he recorded the songs "É Tudo no Meu Nome" and "Se Essa Rua" (the latter featuring Luciana Mello) for the soundtrack of the film Meu Tio Matou um Cara.

In 2005 he was a guest musician on band Charlie Brown Jr.'s album Imunidade Musical, on the track "Cada Cabeça Falante Tem sua Tromba de Elefante". The same year, the music video for his song "Us Guerreiro" was nominated for the MTV Video Music Brazil award in the "Best Rap Video" category.

From 2008 to 2009 he hosted the hip hop culture-oriented variety show Manos e Minas on TV Cultura.

In 2016 he made his first performance at the sixth edition of Rock in Rio.

In 2019 he partnered with Japanese singer MIC on her single "Try", released on April 4. The same year he announced he would be returning to college, to finish a Management course he began two decades prior, also stating he began work on a new album entitled Os Dez Mandamentos, described as a concept album inspired by the Ten Commandments.

In June 2022 he was diagnosed with COVID-19.
