= Facção Central =

Brazilian rap group

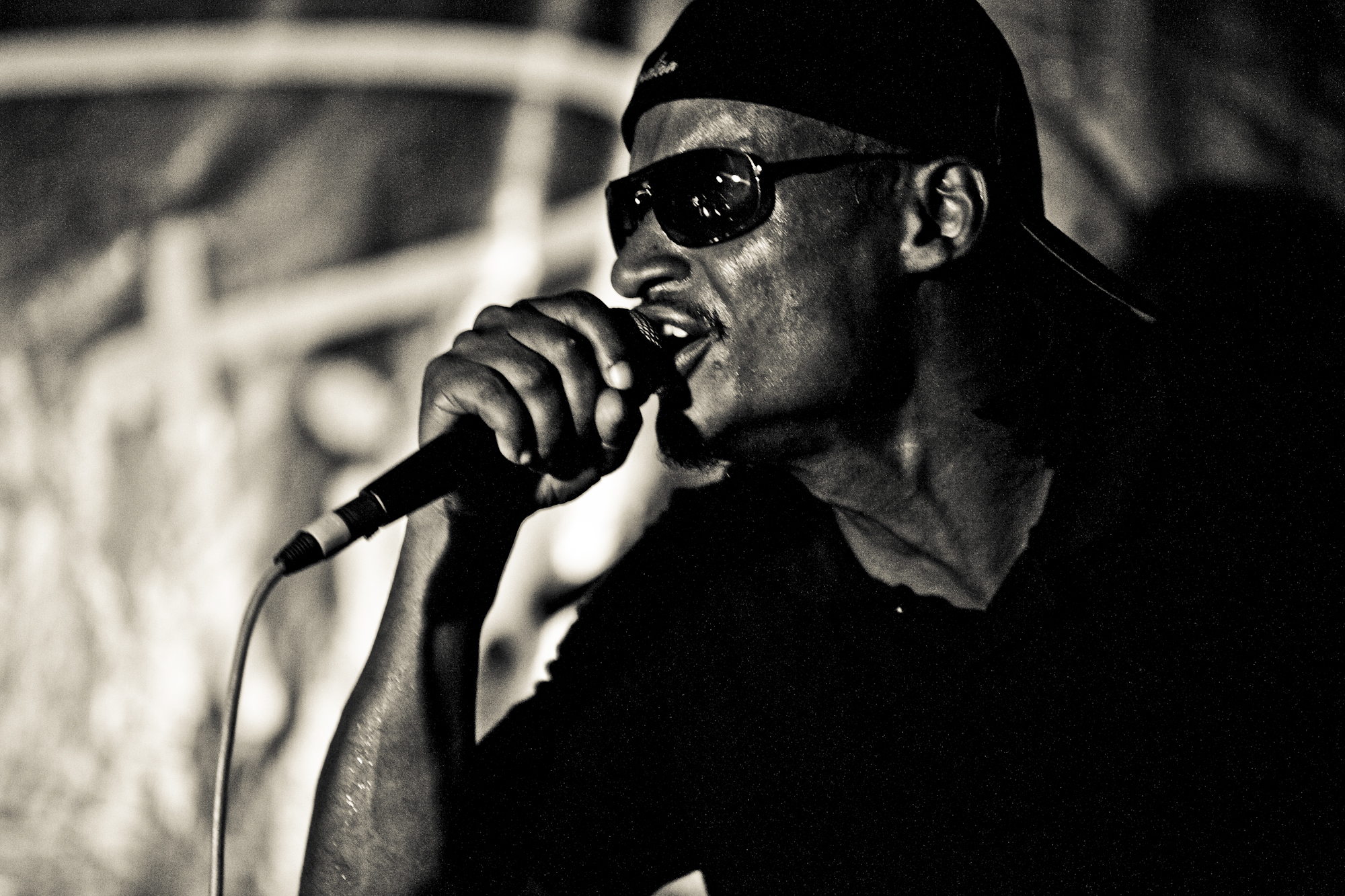
- Dum-Dum of Facção Central performing in 2011

Background information
- Origin: São Paulo, Brazil
- Genres: Gangsta rap; Horrorcore; Political hip hop
- Years active: 1989–2023
- Past members: Dum-Dum (vocals); Eduardo (vocals); Nego; Jurandir; Garga and Erick 12 (Toca discos); DJ Binho (Toca discos); J. Areas (vocals); DJ Marquinhos (Toca discos)

Facção Central was a Brazilian gangsta rap group formed in the city of São Paulo in 1989. The rap group garnered significant attention due to the powerful content of their lyrics, which ultimately led to the arrest of its members following the release of the music video Isso Aqui É uma Guerra ("This Is a War").

== History ==
The group was formed on 31 May 1989, in downtown São Paulo. Initially composed of Jurandir, Cesinha, Serginho, Wilson, and Mag, Mag later left the group and was replaced by Dum-Dum and Eduardo.

From 1997 to 1998, DJ Garga left the group and was replaced by Erick 12, but he too eventually departed. Growing up in the slums, the members were exposed to social violence, drug trafficking, addiction, police violence, police stations, and prisons.

Their violent past transformed into a source of inspiration, resulting in impactful compositions that depict the harsh reality of the lower layers of society. These compositions also harshly criticize those whom the composers perceive as the root causes of the issues discussed in the song lyrics. The group's stance has led to phone threats from the police, radio censorship, arrests due to the content of certain lyrics, and even the prohibition of airing the music video Isso Aqui É uma Guerra on Brazilian television. Authorities considered it to promote crime. The group's songs also reflect their stance on various issues.

The group's musical style is aggressive and violent, and their lyrics adopt a violent yet rational approach. They skillfully blend slang commonly used in the outskirts with formal language. Additionally, they frequently incorporate elements of classical music into their songs. Religion serves as a metaphor for the violence in the world, mediating their message. For instance, their song Hoje Deus Anda de Blindado ("Today God Walks Armored") alludes to the 1999 song Se Deus Vier, Que Venha Armado ("If God Comes, May He Come Armed") by the group Pavilhão 9.

In 1999, the group released the album Versos Sangrentos ("Bloody Verses"), which featured strong beats and protest lyrics addressing themes such as violence, corruption, hunger, police violence, and government inefficiency.

The album faced censorship, as it contained 15 recorded songs and a music video for the track Isso Aqui É uma Guerra, which was accused and censored for promoting crime. The music video was initially aired for six months, even making it onto MTV, but it was later removed for the same reason. The group members clarified that the video did not promote crime, as one of the bank robbers is killed at the end, conveying the message that crime does not pay off.

== After the censorship ==
After the censorship of their music video in the album Versos Sangrentos, Facção Central released their next album titled A Marcha Fúnebre Prossegue (The Funeral March Continues). The album opens with an introduction that includes news excerpts about the censorship, which were featured on various news programs under the headline "Rap that advocates crime, Facção Central," as announced on Jornal Nacional by Fátima Bernardes. This introduction is composed of several "clippings" from Brazilian television news. Following the track Introdução (Introduction), the next song is Dia Comum (Common Day), which portrays the everyday life in Brazilian peripheries. Subsequently, A Guerra Não Vai Acabar (The War Won't End) follows, serving as a "response letter" to the censorship of the music video. This track begins with poignant lyrics and criticism of the prosecution, stating "Hey prosecutor, the nightmare has returned. You censored the video, but the war isn't over. There's still a dead body every 13 minutes in the cities among the fifteen most violent in the world." In the chorus of the same song, they assert, "You can censor, imprison, or kill me, but that's not how the war will end, prosecutor." The album continues to express further criticisms throughout, with notable tracks such as A Marcha Fúnebre Prossegue and Desculpa Mãe (Sorry, Mom). Following A Marcha Fúnebre Prossegue, two more albums were released: Direto do Campo de Extermínio (Straight from the Extermination Camp) and O Espetáculo do Circo dos Horrores (The Spectacle of the Circus of Horrors).

== Departure of Eduardo ==
On 18 March 2013, Eduardo posted a video on YouTube announcing that he was no longer a part of the group due to certain disagreements. He reassured his fans that he would not abandon Rap and expressed his commitment to continuing on this path, aiming to address the pressing issues in the nation.

== Brief period with Moysés ==
The performer and composer Moysés joined Facção Central shortly after Eduardo's departure in 2013. During his time in the group, two songs were recorded. In collaboration with Racionais MC's, who were celebrating 25 years of their career, Moysés performed with Dum-Dum at a show in the East Zone of São Paulo.

On 4 August 2014, Moysés announced his departure, stating, "My decision to leave the group was made after I understood that the way I see the war is different from the way my brother Dum-Dum sees it. Each one has their own view on oppression." Dum-Dum continued to carry the name of the group as the sole responsible for the activities since Eduardo's departure in 2013 until 2023, the year of his death.

== Discography ==
=== Compilation albums ===
- 1993 – Movimento Rap Vol. 2
- 1999 – Família Facção

=== Studio albums ===
- 1994 – Juventude de Atitude
- 1998 – Estamos de Luto
- 1999 – Versos Sangrentos
- 2001 – A Marcha Fúnebre Prossegue
- 2003 – Direto do Campo de Extermínio
- 2006 – O Espetáculo do Circo dos Horrores

=== Live albums ===
- 2005 – Facção Central – Ao Vivo

== Members ==
- Dum-Dum – (1989–2023; died 2023)
- Eduardo – (1989–2013)
- Moysés – (2013–2014)
- DJ Erick 12 – (1997–2001)
- DJ Garja – (1989–1996)
