= Teixeira, Paraíba =

Coordinates: 7.22278°S 37.2539°W

- Municipality
- Teixeira Location on Paraiba
- Country: Brazil
- Region: Northeast
- State: Paraíba
- Mesoregion: Sertao Paraibano

Population (2020)
  - Total: 15,248
- Time zone: UTC−3 (BRT)

Teixeira, Paraíba is a municipality in the state of Paraíba in the Northeast Region of Brazil.

== See also ==
- List of municipalities in Paraíba
