= Wem (musician) =

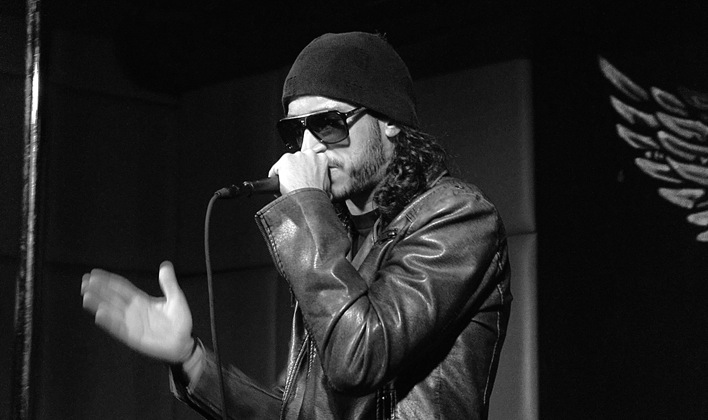

Background information
- Birth name: Wemerson Olivera
- Born: Brazil
- Origin: New Jersey
- Genres: Hip hop
- Occupation(s): Hip hop artist, music video director

Wemerson Olivera, known by the stage name Wem, is a New Jersey–based American hip hop artist and music video director. Wem has been featured in XXL Magazine and is known for establishing himself in the American rap industry after being a first-generation immigrant from Brazil.
