= Rap É Compromisso! =

Rap é Compromisso

Studio album by Sabotage
- Released: 2001
- Recorded: 1999–2001
- Genre: Rap, alternative hip hop
- Label: Cosa Nostra

Rap é Compromisso is the first and only studio album by Brazilian rapper Sabotage, released in 2001.

== Tracks ==
1. "Introdução" - (2:30)
2. "Rap é Compromisso!" (com Negra Li) - (4:23)
3. "Um Bom Lugar" (com Black Alien) - (5:05)
4. "No Brooklin" (com Negra Li) - (5:47)
5. "Cocaína" (com Sombra e Bastardo) - (4:58)
6. "Na Zona Sul" (com Cascão TSG) - (5:15)
7. "A Cultura" (com Rappin' Hood & Potencial 3) - (4:42)
8. "Incentivando o Som" (com Sandrão) - (3:56)
9. "Respeito é Pra Quem Tem" (com RZO) - (5:29)
10. "País da Fome" - (3:43)
11. "Cantando Pro Santo" (com Chorão) - (6:06)

== Album ==
The album sold over 1,734,461 copies and is certified as Triple Diamond by the Brazilian Association of Record Producers. It is considered one of the most important albums in the history of rap in Brazil.
