= Consciência Humana =

Brazilian rap group

- Origin: São Mateus, São Paulo, São Paulo, Brazil
- Genres: Hip hop; Gangsta rap
- Years active: 1990-present
- Members: Dj Luiz Só Monstro; Preto Aplick; WGi
- Website: myspace.com/conscienciahumana

Consciência Humana is a Brazilian rap group formed in São Paulo in 1990. It is known for edgy lyrics, which led to the group receiving death threats from the police and a dispute with the former captain of the Policia Militar (PM) Conte Lopes, current deputy of the PDB.

== History ==
The group was formed in 1990 in the East Zone of São Paulo by the members of Preto Aplick, W.G.I. and DJ Andermad. In 1992, Andermad left the group and created Gang Wild after Dj San Mix became the second DJ of the group, staying for a while and soon after the time came the DJ Adriano was invited to participate in the group. DJ Adriano was in the group for twelve years, between 1992 and 2004 and was replaced by DJ Master Jay, a former member of Sistema Negro. Master Jay lasted only one year and then was replaced by DJ and music producer Dj Luiz Só Monstro who later produced the album 'strong firm' in 2013, and is still in the group. .

In 1992, the group participated in the collection Consciousness Project Rap Brazil, with the songs "Slave Ship" and "Town Without Law," which began to be played on Radio Metropolitana FM. The group released its first album in 1994, called Sees his own mistakes, which presented hit songs "It's time" and "Blood B". Two years later, CH set up his own record label, DRR (Defensores do Ritmo de Rua Productions, with the help of Porte Illegal, and released the single "Law of the periphery".

The following year, with its own label, the group released a second album entitled Between Adolescence and Crime, with "Memories", "Childhood friend" and "Travel". In 1999, the first video called "Between Adolescence and Crime" was recorded. In 2001 three groups joined: Human Consciousness, The Less Crime and UNEGRO, which gave rise to Men Skulls, which released the album D.R.R invading the system.

In 2003, the group was invited by the Zambian Phonographic label to record their third album, Agony Hill. It was assisted by artists such as Beth Carvalho, Central Faction, The Less Crime, and Soundtrack Ghetto, among others. The group's first musical success mentions military names well known in peripheral neighbourhoods. The repercussion of complaints generated persecution and threats against the rappers. Human Consciousness began to gain prominence in 1991 with their lyrics focused mainly on the violence of the state, most intense in the outskirts after the civil-military dictatorship (1964–1985). It was in this context that the song "Tá na Hora" was released, which depicts the murders committed by police Round Ostensive Tobias de Aguiar (Rota).

in 2013 the group released the album 'strong firm' which featured several participations such as, black system, extreme distress, Moyses, Angel Duarte, Lauren and more ... In 2014 released the music video 'connection 011 019' and He's been doing shows there and his band members are taking care of their solo careers too.

== Discography ==
=== Studio albums ===
- 1991 – Coletânea Rap Brasil vol2
- 1992 – Enxergue Seus Próprios Erros
- 1996 – Single : Lei da periferia
- 1997 – Entre a Adolescência e o Crime
- 2003 – Agonia do Morro
- 2010 – Single: Resumo Oficial
- 2011 – Single: Garoto do Gueto
- 2012 – Single: Advogado Bom
- 2014 – Firma Forte

=== Singles ===
- 1996 – Lei da periferia
- 2001- The war of 2001 destroyed many houses and formed earthquakes
