= Tribo da Periferia =

Brazilian hip hop group

- Origin: Brasília, Brazil
- Genres: Hip hop; Rap; Trap
- Years active: 1998 – Present
- Label: Kamika-z Produtora
- Members: Duckjay; Look

Tribo da Periferia is a Brazilian hip hop group consisting of rapper/producer Duckjay and Look. The group has released various well known hits, such as: Imprevisível, Alma de Pipa and Insônia.

Originally, the group was composed of Duckjay, Mano Marley and Alisson, also working together with DJ Bola Tribo and AceDace. Eventually, the group was restructured when Mano Marley and Alisson left, causing the group formation to be altered. DJ Bola and AceDace also ceased their collaborations with the group, and Duckjay initiated new projects with Look.

== History ==
Formed in Brasília, DF, Brazil in 1998, Tribo da Periferia released their first album with many difficulties and obstacles. The first album Verdadeiro Brasileiro possessed 12 tracks and was created on a low budget, but helped establish the group's political views.

In 2005, Tribo da Periferia released their first hit song: Carro de Malandro. Following the release of Carro de Malandro, Duckjay began to receive recognition from the Brazilian music scene. Marília Mendonça invited the group to perform at a local festival in Goiânia.

In 2016, the group won the Palco Mp3 award for being the most accessed artist in the Rap/Hip-Hop category. Currently, the group possesses seven albums. A show was performed in the Mané Garrincha stadium in Brasília to celebrate Tribo da Periferia's twenty-year career. After years of dedication, they have managed to establish a consistent following on their YouTube channel with over one billion views total. While, on Spotify, Tribo da Perifeira has about 9.5 million listeners and 1.64 million followers.

== Discography ==
=== Studio albums ===
- Verdadeiro Brasileiro (2003)
- Tudo Nosso (2005)
- 1° Último (2011)
- 2° Último (2013)
- Lost tape (2013)
- 3° Último (2014)
- 4° Último (2016)
- 5° Último (2019)
- Híbrido (2021)

=== Singles ===
- Insônia (2014) with Hungria Hip Hop
- Photoshop (2020)

== Awards and nominations ==
- Prêmio Palco Mp3 (Artist with most streams)
- Hutuz 2008 (Duckjay was nominated in the best producer category)
