= Ray Davies (trumpeter) =

- Born: 7 October 1927; Swansea, Wales
- Died: 20 July 2017 (aged 89)
- Occupations: trumpeter; bandleader; composer; musician
- Spouse: Diane Davies
- Children: incl. Rhett Davies
- Musical career
- Also known as: Ray Kendall, Chico Rey
- Genres: Big band; Lounge music
- Instruments: Trumpet, Flugelhorn
- Labels: Dansan Records, DJM Records, Fontana, Philips, Pye

Ray Davies was a Welsh trumpeter, session musician, and bandleader, active from the 1940s to 1970s. Much of his work featured on the Boosey & Hawkes stock music library, experiencing a surge in popularity during the 1990s lounge revival, and he also frequently conducted the BBC Radio Orchestra, as well as playing for the BBC Big Band. He is the father of record producer Rhett Davies, and served as chairman of BASCA from 2004 to 2010.

During his childhood, he played in local military bands, after which he attended the Royal College of Music. After finishing his education, he began to play trumpet for a large number of orchestras, big bands, and theatres across London, including that of Frank Cordell.

In the 1960s, he took part in a session for Reader's Digest, which, wanting a British response to Herb Alpert, led to Davies forming his band. This group was known as Ray Davies and The Button-Down Brass (or The Button-Down Brass Featuring The Funky Trumpet of Ray Davies), and it released a series of popular easy-listening albums, as well as covers of television and film theme tunes.

At the same time, he also entered the pop scene, playing trumpet on records such as It's Not Unusual, Downtown, and Shirley Bassey's version of Big Spender. Known for his short temper, he became an accomplished songwriter, and he was consulted by many pop bands, including The Beatles and The Rolling Stones, on musical arrangements.

A British pop-musicians’ magazine profiled him in 1967: “After first studying at the Royal College of Music, Ray’s first professional job was with the Teddy Foster band in Birmingham. That was in 1943, and he played third trumpet. At the end of the war, he came to London, and began doing palais and night club gigs with the touring bands of the day….Now he’s one of the busiest sessioneers around, doing three sessions a day, seven days a week….’I always make sure of getting a couple of good holidays a year. Around Christmas, I disappear to Austria for a few weeks skiing, and in the summer go to my villa on the island of Minorca.’ If you can’t remember ‘Downtown’ or ‘The Legion’s Lost Patrol,’ you can still hear Ray’s trumpet on ‘Top of The Pops’ every week, leading the Ray Davies’ Orchestra on ‘Breakfast Special’ every morning, and with the Button-Down Band on ‘Swingalong.’ When Henry Mancini or Burt Bacharach visit these shores, the trumpet player they ask for is Ray Davies. As do such artists as Ella Fitzgerald, Tony Bennett and Mel Torme. And….if you’ve seen ‘Casino Royale,’ they you’re heard Ray Davies playing the fluegelhorn solos.”

He died at the age of 89, on 20 July 2017.

== Discography (in progress) ==
Albums as leader, 1970s - 1990s, and The Button-Down Brass performances, 1960s, 1970s.

Davies' surviving music library of arrangements is in the custody of Gavin Sutherland.
