= Ferréz =

Brazilian rapper and writer

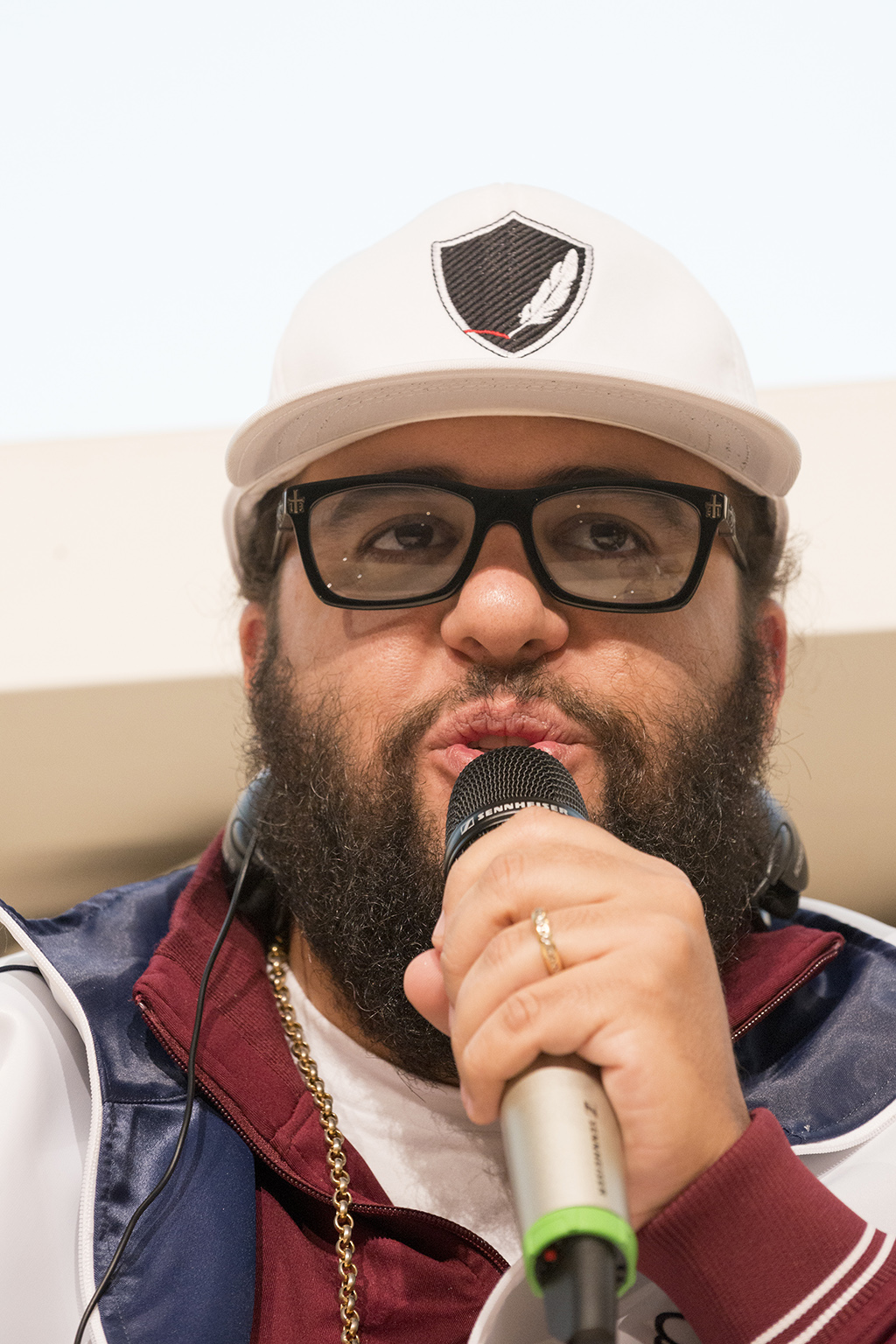
- Born: Reginaldo Ferreira da Silva; 1975 (age 50–51); São Paulo, Brazil
- Occupations: Novelist, Poet, Short story writer, rapper, activist
- Writing career
- Movements: Dirty realism, Marginal literature

Ferréz (Reginaldo Ferreira da Silva) (born 1975) is a Brazilian author, rapper, cultural critic and activist from Zona Sul (Southern Borough) favela of Capão Redondo in São Paulo, Brazil. He is a leader of Literatura Marginal (Marginal Literature) that started in the late 1990s and early 2000s in the outskirts of São Paulo. His writings are notable for descriptions of graphic violence and the stark reality of individuals living on the margins of society. He emphasises that his writings are addressed to the youth that live in the slums, so that they feel a sense of pride in reading literature that reflects their reality and experiences.

== Life ==
Ferréz, whose real name is Reginaldo Ferreira da Silva, was born in the Favela of Valo Velho on the southern outskirts of São Paulo in 1975. He was nicknamed after two Brazilian folk heroes: the widely known Lampião (actually Virgulino Ferreira) from the northeast part of Brazil and Zumbi, the legendary slave leader. Ferréz started making attempts to write poems and raps at the age of seven. Despite lacking any formal education, he unsuccessfully tried to become familiar with works of literature of several Brazilian writers such as Carlos Drummond de Andrade. After leaving school, he worked as a broom-seller, temporary worker in many different positions and archivist. He has since considered a literary representative of the Brazilian slums.

== Writing style ==
Ferréz's writing style reflects the oral culture of the urban periphery and of hip hop culture from São Paulo. Slangs are extremely prevalent in his books as well as inaccurate language use, even the spelling he uses reflects the colloquial speaking patterns of individuals from the favelas.

== Debates ==
Ferrez was involved in a polemic discussion with Luciano Huck, a TV presenter. Luciano was mugged while he was in a traffic jam and wrote an article complaining about public security in Brazil. By contrast, Ferrez tried to support the behaviour of the criminal, stating that "how come someone could wear something as valuable as a couple of houses in the slums". On account of this article, Ferrez was charged and found guilty of crime apology. The debate between the two went on in the media, up to a point which Luciano said to some close friends: "typical behaviour of those who envy others and who does not have the courage and skills to succeed in life".

== Main works ==
=== Fortaleza da Desilusão ===
Fortress of Disillusionment - 1997

His first book, Fortaleza da Desilusão is a collection of concrete poems and was published with the financial support of his then-employer.

=== Capão Pecado – 1999 ===
His first novel, the story revolves around the young man Rael who lives in the favela of Capão Redondo attempting to overcome the social stigma of living in the urban periphery.

=== Manual prático do ódio ===
The Practical Manual of Hate – 2003

Ferréz's second novel, the story revolves around a group of criminals or bandits who live in São Paulo. The complexity in the novel is the overlapping and intersecting of each individual criminal's history to the present moment where the reader finds the group involved in activities ranging from robbery, hanging out at the club to intimate relationship with others.

=== Amanhecer Esmeralda – 2005 ===
Ferréz's first children's book, this literary work demonstrates the author's first project into children's literature and education. The story focuses on a little girl named Amanhecer who also lives in the favela. This book's intended audience are children from the urban periphery who are predominantly Afro-Brazilian which is clear since many references to African culture and pride are prevalent throughout the entire book.

=== Ninguém é inocente em São Paulo ===
No one is innocent in São Paulo – 2006

This book is a collection of short stories and prose written by Ferréz.
