= Sabotage (rapper) =

Brazilian rapper (1973–2003)

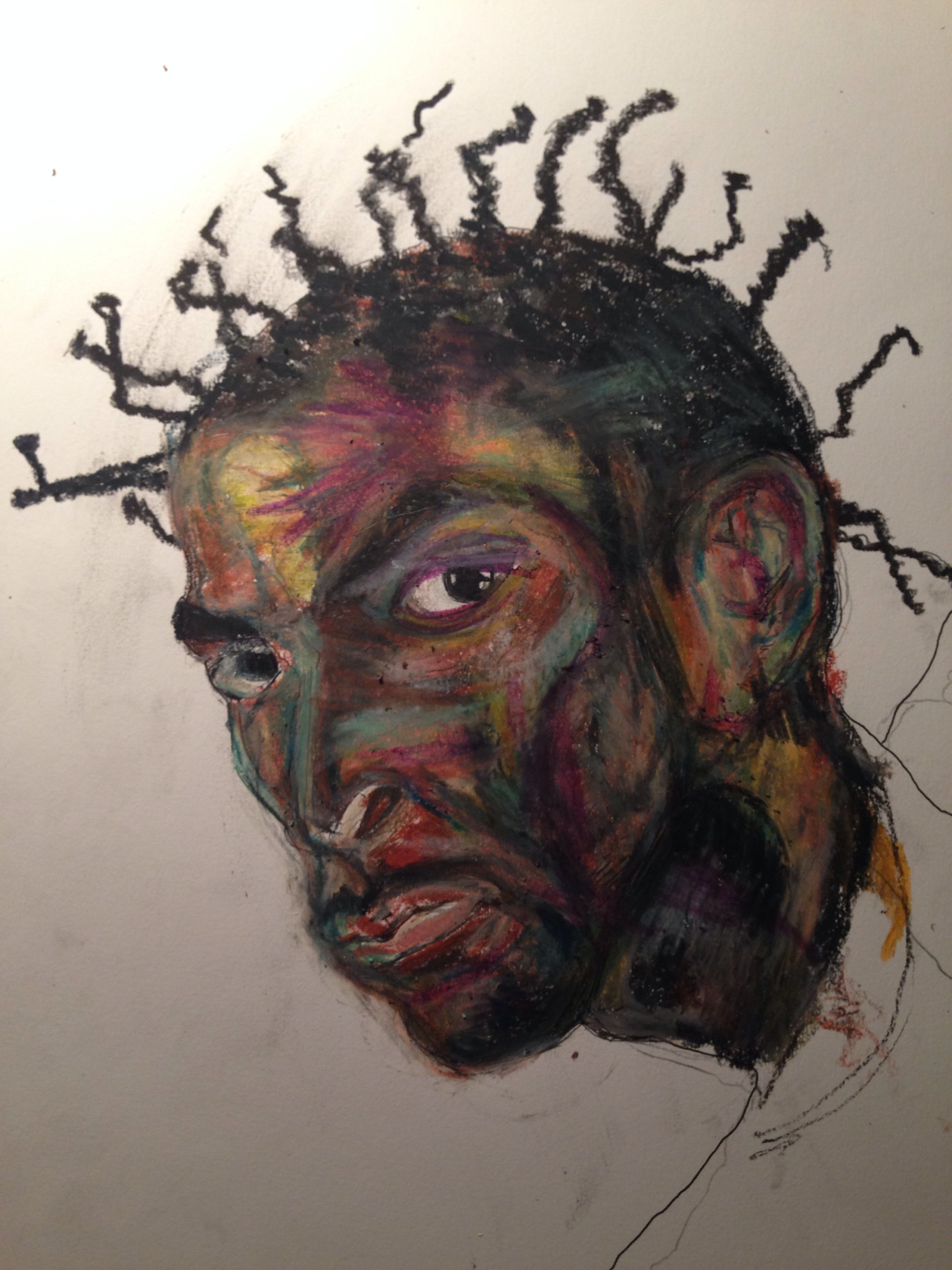
- Sabotage

Background information
- Born: Mauro Mateus dos Santos; April 3, 1973; São Paulo, Brazil
- Died: January 24, 2003 (aged 29) São Paulo, Brazil
- Genres: Gangsta rap; rap rock
- Occupations: Rapper, songwriter
- Label: Cosa Nostra Fonográfica

Mauro Mateus dos Santos (April 3, 1973 – January 24, 2003), better known by his stage name Sabotage, was a Brazilian rapper and songwriter from São Paulo.

== Early life ==
He grew up selling drugs in Brooklin Novo, a neighborhood in São Paulo’s South Zone. He gained fame in 2001 after the release of his first and only album titled Rap é Compromisso. He performed on other artists' recordings, such as Sepultura's Revolusongs EP, a cover of Public Enemy's "Black Steel in the Hour of Chaos", which was released in 2002. That same year, he appeared as himself in the Brazilian film The Trespasser (O Invasor) and contributed to its soundtrack. This was followed soon after by an acting role as Fuinha in the movie Carandiru.

His influence as a musician was crucial for the growth of hip-hop in Brazil, meaning that his vision and style were unique and inspiring for many rappers. His lyrics were full of words of wisdom of a man who experienced a hard early life in the favelas of Brazil. In 2016, his posthumous album, Sabotage, was released.

== Death ==
In 2003, Sabotage died after being shot four times in the head and chest. No arrest was made, and, despite the nature of the attack, no connection was established between his drug-peddling and his violent death.

== Discography ==
- Rap É Compromisso! (2001)
- Uma Luz Que Nunca Irá se Apagar (2002)
- Rap é o Hino que Me Mantém Vivo (2008)
- Sabotage (2015)
- Sabotage 50 (2024)

== See also ==
- List of murdered hip hop musicians
