= Racionais MC's =

Brazilian hip hop group

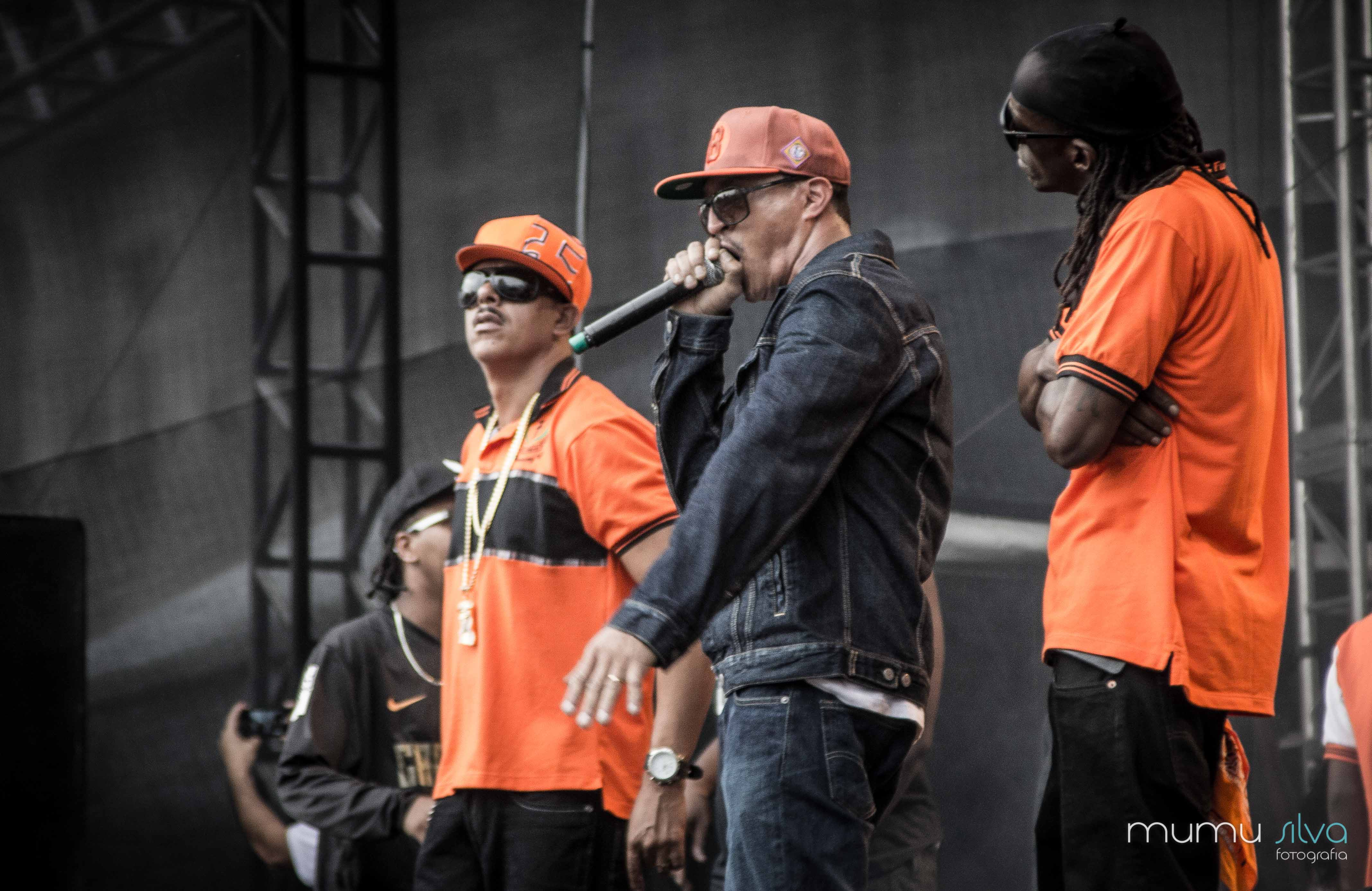

Background information
- Origin: São Paulo, Brazil
- Genres: Gangsta rap, hip hop, political hip hop
- Years active: 1988–present
- Labels: Zimbabwe, Cosa Nostra, Boogie Naipe
- Members: Mano Brown; Ice Blue; Edi Rock; KL Jay

Racionais MC's is a Brazilian hip hop group based in São Paulo. The original lineup formed in 1988 consisted of Mano Brown, Ice Blue, Edi Rock, and DJ KL Jay. Each member hails from the ring of favelas around São Paulo. Their lyrics combine themes of social justice with gangster imagery, a far cry from the idyllic breeziness typically associated with Brazilian rap music, Racionais MC's is often considered the most important Brazilian rap group. Their name recognizes Tim Maia's monumental double album Racional vols. 1 and 2.

== History ==
=== The Zimbabwe Years (1988–1995) ===
Racionais MC's first appeared on the Zimbabwe Records label compilation Consciência Black (Black Conscience) in 1988. Their songs Pânico na Zona Sul ("Panic on the South Zone") and Tempos Difíceis ("Hard Times") offer a snapshot of favela life with lyrics vividly depicting rampant police brutality, racism, poverty, and crime. The group released their first album, Holocausto Urbano (Urban Holocaust) in 1990. The EP included the two songs from Consciência Black along with three new tracks dealing with themes of loose women and institutionalized racism. The group played several shows around the city and state of São Paulo over the next two years, including two shows at the FEBEM (Fundação Estadual do Bem-Estar do Menor) juvenile detention center and a special show with Public Enemy at the Ginásio do Ibirapuera.

Racionais MC's gained national attention with their participation in the Ministry of Education's RAPensando a Educação (a word play, roughly translated as "Rap-Thinking Education") program in 1992. The program included lectures and discussions in schools on a variety of issues affecting favela inhabitants, including drugs, police violence, poverty, and racism. These forums had the dual effect of expanding awareness of Racionas MC's agenda along with their fan base, as residents the favelas in cities across Brazil could relate to the Paulista rap group's experience. That year the group released their second album, Escolha o Seu Caminho (Choose Your Path), with the notable tracks "Voz Ativa" ("Active Voice") and "Negro Limitado" ("Limited Black Man"). Following its release the group headlined the Rap no Vale show at Vale do Anhangabaú in São Paulo.

In 1993 the group saw their notoriety continue to increase. They participated in the National Theatre's Música Negra em Ação (Black Music in Action) project alongside Thaíde e DJ Hum, another prominent São Paulo Hip Hop act. Their philanthropic activities continued as they played several benefit shows for health clinics, youth sports programs, and samba schools. The year also saw the release of their first full-length LP Raio X Brasil (X-Ray Brazil). The album includes several standout tracks including "Fim de Semana no Parque" ("Weekend in the Park"), a lyrical sketch of lowlifes in São Paulo; "Mano na Porta do Bar" ("Man at the Bar Door"), a skillful remix of Curtis Mayfield's "Freddie's Dead"; and the unexpected harmonica and piano jam "Fio da Navalha" ("Razor Edge"). Mano Brown won the Prêmio Sharp award for "O Homem na Estrada" ("The Man on the Road"), one of the album's other notable tracks. A 1994 show at the Vale do Anhangabaú in support of the album ended in a riot when police raided the show and arrested the group. The group was charged with inciting violence.

=== Cosa Nostra (1995–present) ===
The presentations continued and increasing impact of Racionais MC's beginning to extrapolate the boundaries of São Paulo. In 1997, a sort of 'DIY' (do it yourself) rap group inaugurates its own label Cosa Nostra Phonographic with the release of the album Sobrevivendo no Inferno (Surviving in Hell), selling over 1.5 million copies independently including the tracks' Diário de um Detento (Diary of a Prisoner), Fórmula Mágica da Paz ('Magic Formula for Peace'), Capítulo 4, Versículo 3 ('Chapter 4, Verse 3') and Mágico de Oz ('Wizard of Oz'). Stamp still throw discs Sabotage, RZO and Revelation 16, and Rosana Bronks define a well peculiar group work with his musical career. Brown, KL Jay, Blue and Edi Rock has, to date, control of its entire production, from composing and recording his own albums in a studio, to distribution. Among 12 songs of Sobrevivendo no Inferno took one previously unknown proportions. Composed in partnership with ex-con Jocenir, the track Diário de um Detento ('Diary of a Detainee') bursted on the radio in the country, portraying the tension that preceded the rebellion of 1992 in Carandiru Penitentiary in São Paulo, where 111 prisoners were killed by Military Police of São Paulo State's Special Troops.

With the launch of a scathing clip for the new hit, the Racionais MC's went to VMB and won the prize 'Audience Choice' - equivalent to the current 'Artist of the Year'. On the occasion, the group made a memorable presentation and were cheered by the audience. Their popularity reached even further with the release of the Album Nada como um dia após o outro which was widely acclaimed by the critics, and made many hits such as "Vida Loka I", "Vida Loka II", "Negro Drama", "Jesus Chorou" e "Estilo Cachorro".

Some of its tracks, such as 'Vida Loka' I and II, 'Negro Drama' and 'Jesus Chorou' are still some of the most performed at concerts. But despite the success, the album would mark the beginning of an 11-year hiatus without any album releases. Released in 2006 the first DVD of the group, '1000 Trutas, 1000 Tretas', a record of 15 songs recorded during concerts held since 2002. The only new song from the compilation is the track 'Abenção Mamãe, Abenção Papai', which includes a cameo by Jorge Ben Jor. In the year following the release of the DVD, reliving the episode of 1994, the Police intervened in the Racionais MC's presentation during the Virada Cultural. The confusion would have started after the police repress some people from the audience who tried to climb a newsstand to watch the show.

Some songs came to publicised on the web, but no official release has been made, In 2012 the group released the video clip of the song Mil faces de um homem leal (Thousand faces a loyal man) which portrays the life of Bahia, communist militant, enemy number 1 of the Military Dictatorship in Brazil, Carlos Marighella, the video that was recorded in the 'Occupation Maua' - housing considered the 'New Pinheirinho' for housing more than 200 families in the city center of São Paulo - refers to armed struggle against the military dictatorship in Brazil, interspersing historical images of protests, with scenes of Mano Brown, Ice Blue, KL Jay, Edi Rock and Dexter invited back to 1969 with the occupation of Radio National, with Carlos Marighella sending a message and calling on the people to resist and fight oppression. On a memorable night, the video won the award for best video of the year at VMB 2012. The group's sixth studio album, Cores e Valores, was released in 2014.

== Discography ==
Studio albums

- Raio-X do Brasil (1993)
- Sobrevivendo no Inferno (1997)
- Nada Como um Dia Após o Outro Dia (2002)
- Cores & Valores (2014)

Extended plays

- Holocausto Urbano (1990)
- Escolha Seu Caminho (1992)

Live albums

- Ao Vivo (2001)
- 1000 Trutas, 1000 Tretas (2006)

Compilation albums

- Racionais MC's (1994)

== Awards and nominations ==
Year	Prize	Category	Ref
1998	VMB	Audience's Choice	
2002	Prêmio Hutúz	Grupo ou Artista Solo	
2006	Ordem do Mérito Cultural	Música	
2009	Prêmio Hutúz	Melhores artistas da década	
2012	VMB	Clip of the Year	
2014	Multishow Brazilian Music Award	Best Show	
