= Mano Brown =

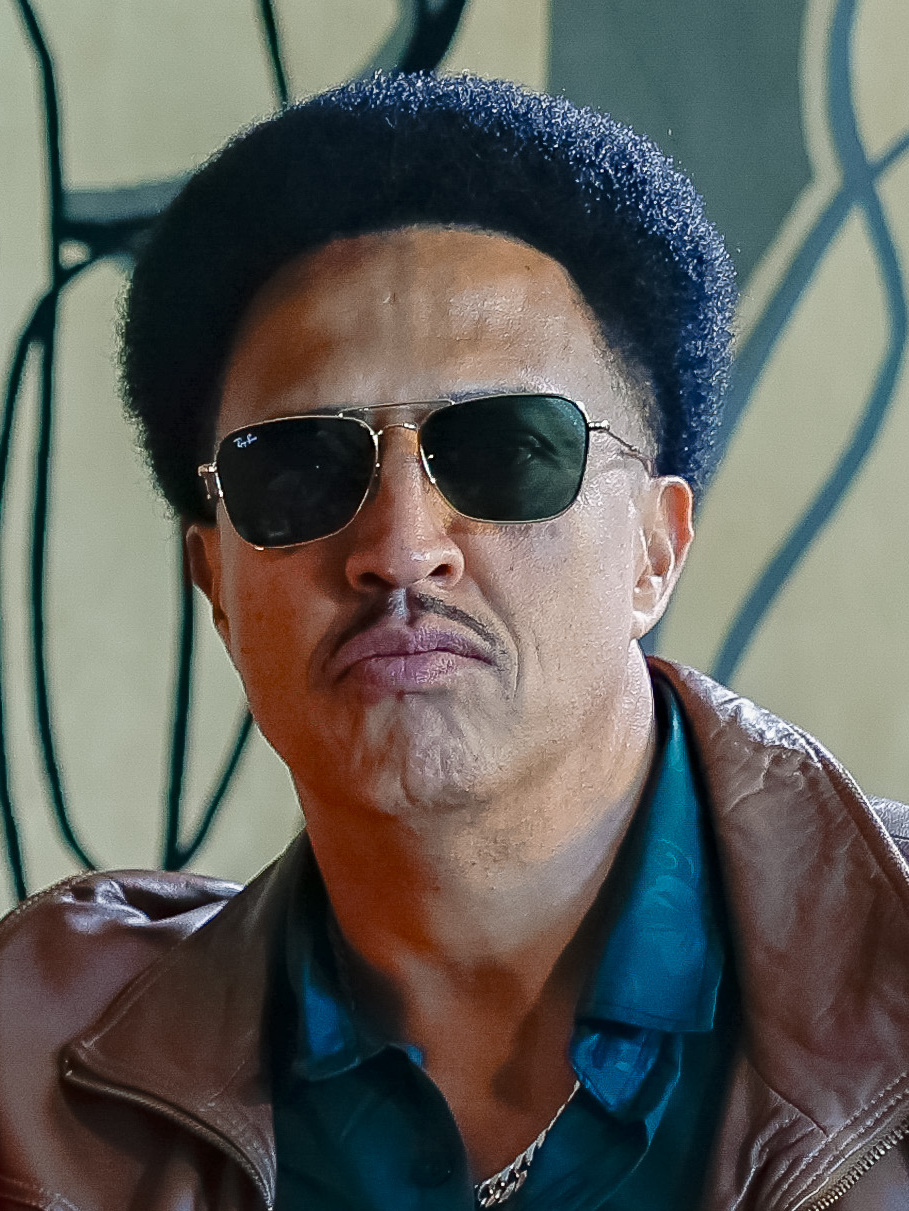

Background information
- Born: Pedro Paulo Soares Pereira; 22 April 1970 (age 56); Capão Redondo, São Paulo, SP, Brazil
- Genre: Hip hop
- Occupations: Rapper; producer; activist
- Years active: 1988–present

Pedro Paulo Soares Pereira (born 22 April 1970), better known by the artistic name Mano Brown, is a Brazilian rapper, music producer and founding member of the hip hop group Racionais MC's, along with Ice Blue (Paulo Eduardo Salvador), Edi Rock (Edivaldo Pereira Alves) and KL Jay (Kleber Geraldo Lelis Simões).

== Career ==
In 2008, Rolling Stone chose the 100 greatest artists in Brazilian music; Mano Brown was 28th. His debut solo album Boogie Naipe was nominated for the 2017 Latin Grammy Award for Best Portuguese Language Contemporary Pop Album.

== Discography ==
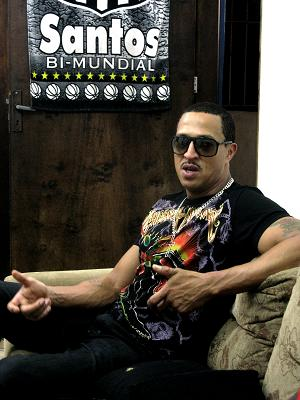
Mano Brown in 2013

=== Racionais MC's ===
- 1990 – Holocausto Urbano
- 1992 – Escolha o Seu Caminho
- 1993 – Raio-X do Brasil
- 1997 – Sobrevivendo no Inferno
- 2001 – Racionais MC's Ao Vivo
- 2002 – Nada como um Dia Após o Outro Dia
- 2006 – 1000 Trutas, 1000 Tretas
- 2014 – Cores e Valores

=== Solo ===
- 2016 – Boogie Naipe
