= List of songs recorded by Mallu Magalhães =

This is a chronological list of officially released songs by Brazilian folk singer, songwriter and musician Mallu Magalhães.

== Released songs ==
=== 2008 ===
- "Angelina"
- "Anyone Else But You"
- "Don't You Leave Me"
- "Don't You Look Back"
- "Dry Freezing Tongue"
- "Faz"
- "Get To Denmark"
- "Girassóis"
- "Happy Song"
- "Have You Ever"
- "Her Day Will Come"
- "Hora Marcada"
- "I Do Believe"
- "I Really Know Boys"
- "Il Va Partir"
- "It Ain't Me Babe"
- "It Takes Two To Tango"
- "J1"
- "Letrinhas dos Jornais"
- "Meia Colorida"
- "Mr. Blue Eyes"
- "My Honey"
- "Noil"
- "O Preço da Flor"
- "Once Upon a Time There Was a Flying Cat"
- "Pata de Leão"
- "Song To George"
- "Sualk"
- "Tchubaruba"
- "Town of Rock'n'Roll"
- "Vanguart"
- "Versinho de Número Três"
- "Xylophones"
- "You Know You've Got"

=== 2009 ===
- "A Risk To Take"
- "Aí-Há"
- "Bee on the Grass"
- "Compromisso"
- "Daniel e Cecília"
- "É Você Que Tem"
- "Make It Easy"
- "My Home Is My Man"
- "Nem Fé Nem Santo"
- "O Herói, O Marginal"
- "Ricardo"
- "Shine Yellow"
- "Soul Mate"
- "Te Acho Tão Bonito"
- "Versinho de Número Três"
- "Versinho de Número Um"
- "You Ain't Gonna Loose"

== Unofficially released songs ==
This is a chronological list of unofficially released songs by Folk singer Mallu Magalhães.

=== 2008–2010 ===
- "A Vida Sempre Ensina"
- "Bossa Sem Nome"
- "Bossa Sem Nome (Version 2)"
- "Hound Dog"
- "Moreno do Cabelo Enroladinho"
- "Música Urbana"
- "Sambinha Bom"
- "Sambinha Sem Refrão"
- "Versinho de Número Cinco"

== Miscellaneous songs ==
=== Collaborations ===
2009 on Marcelo Camelo's Sou

- "Janta"

== Cover versions ==
=== Recorded material ===
This is a chronological list of cover versions that have been commercially released by Mallu Magalhães:

- 2009 – "How D'You Do" – (originally by Paul McCartney) recorded for the album "Beatles 69 Vol.2 – O Outro Lado Da Abbey Road".
- 2009 – "It Ain't Me Babe" – (originally by Bob Dylan) recorded for the album "Letra & Música: Bob Dylan".

=== Live songs ===
This list includes cover versions performed live by Mallu Magalhães. Only vocal performances and musical elements with substantial use have been included:

2008 on 2008 tour:

- "Folsom Prison Blues" – by Johnny Cash

2010 on 2010 tour:

- "Pode Vir Quente Que Estou Fervendo" – by Erasmo Carlos

== See also ==
- Mallu Magalhães discography
