= 2010 MTV Video Music Brazil =

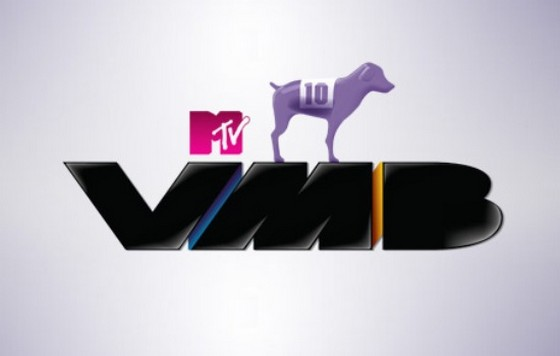
- Date: September 16, 2010
- Location: Credicard Hall
- Hosted by: Marcelo Adnet

Television/radio coverage
- Network: MTV Brasil

The 2010 MTV Video Music Brazil, known as VMB 2010 in Brazil, was held on September 16, 2010, hosted by Marcelo Adnet and took place at the Credicard Hall, São Paulo. It awarded the best in Brazilian music, popular culture and internet culture in the year of 2010. The most notable moments in the show were the 5 awards received by pop band Restart, including for Best New Act and Act of the Year, this last sounded by boos from the audience. There was also a live performance by American alternative rock band OK Go, the appearance of electropop duo 3OH!3, Mexican singer Christian Chávez and Paraguayan model Larissa Riquelme, among many Brazilian personalities.

== Nominations ==
Winners are in bold.

=== Act of the Year ===
- Otto
- Fresno
- **Restart**
- NX Zero
- Sandy
- Pitty
- Mallu Magalhães
- Capital Inicial
- Skank
- Arnaldo Antunes

=== Video of the Year ===
- Skank — "Noites de um Verão Qualquer"
- Mombojó — "Pa Pa Pa"
- NX Zero — "Só Rezo"
- Mallu Magalhães — "Shine Yellow"
- Marcelo D2 (featuring Zuzuca Poderosa and DJ Nuts) — "Meu Tambor"
- Capital Inicial — "Depois da Meia-Noite"
- Vespas Mandarinas — "Sem Nome"
- Diogo Nogueira — "Tô Fazendo a Minha Parte"
- **Restart — "Recomeçar"**
- Cine — "A Usurpadora"

=== Hit of the Year ===
- **Restart — "Levo Comigo"**
- NX Zero — "Só Rezo"
- Skank — "Noites de Um Verão Qualquer"
- Sandy — "Pés Cansados"
- Pitty — "Fracasso"

=== Best New Act ===
- **Restart**
- Hori
- Hevo 84
- Replace
- Karina Buhr

=== Best International Act ===
- Paramore
- The Black Eyed Peas
- Green Day
- **Justin Bieber**
- Tokio Hotel
- Jay-Z
- Kesha
- Lady Gaga
- Katy Perry
- Beyoncé

=== MTV Bet ===
- Flora Matos
- The Name
- Apanhador Só
- Unidade Imaginária
- **Thiago Pethit**

=== International Bet ===
- Janelle Monáe
- Darwin Deez
- **School of Seven Bells**
- Big K.R.I.T.
- Toro y Moi

=== Best Pop ===
- Mallu Magalhães
- Sandy
- Fresno
- Lulu Santos
- **Restart**

=== Best Rock ===
- **Pitty**
- Capital Inicial
- Glória
- NX Zero
- Strike

=== Best MPB ===
- Otto
- **Diogo Nogueira**
- Céu
- Cidadão Instigado
- Lucas Santana

=== Best Rap ===
- Kamau
- Ogi
- Rincon Sapiência
- Lurdez da Luz
- **MV Bill**

=== Best Electronic ===
- Gui Boratto
- Killer on the Dancefloor
- Zemaria
- Database
- **Boss in Drama**

=== Best Live Act ===
- Otto
- Pitty
- Arnaldo Antunes
- Capital Inicial
- **NX Zero**

=== Webstar ===
- PC Siqueira – maspoxavida
- **Felipe Neto**
- MysteryGuitarMan
- Katylene
- @OCriador

=== Web Hit of the Year ===
- Cala Boca Galvão ("Shut Up Galvão") - Save Galvão Birds Campaign
- **Justin Biba** ("Little Gay Justin") - Justin Bieber's "Baby" parody by Galo Frito
- Puta falta de sacanagem (fucking lack of immorality)
- Zeca Camargo yawning live in Fantástico (June 6, 2010)
- Dunga em Um Dia de Fúria ("Dunga's Day of Rage")

=== Video Game of the Year ===
- God of War III
- **Super Mario Galaxy 2**
- Batman Arkham Asylum
- Red Dead Redemption
- Call of Duty: Modern Warfare 2

== Performances ==
- Restart (played live at the Victor Civita square) — "Recomeçar"
- Fresno — "Redenção"/"Deixa o Tempo"/"Revanche"
- Capital Inicial — "Depois da Meia-Noite"
- Hevo 84, Fake Number, Gloria and Replace (performed for the 20th anniversary of MTV Brasil) — "Zoio D Lula"/"Mulher de Fases"
- Otto — "Crua"
- OK Go — "This Too Shall Pass"
- Gaiola das Cabeçudas (featuring Valesca Popozuda) — "Funk Educativo"

Note: "Gaiola da Cabeçudas" is a humorous musical group formed by comedians and VJs of MTV Brasil, they are Marcelo Adnet, Rafael Queiroga, Paulinho Serra, Rodrigo Capella and Guilherme Santana, also a satire of the Brazilian funk carioca group Gaiola das Popozudas (Cage of Big-Asses), led by Valesca Popozuda, a real singer.

== Appearances ==
- MariMoon — introduced Restart
- 3OH!3 and Rafael Queiroga — introduced Fresno
- Palmirinha Onofre and Colírios Capricho — introduced Capital Inicial
- Sabrina Parlatore, Luiz Thunderbird and Bento Ribeiro — introduced the Special Jam Session of MTV Brasil' 20 Years
- Marcelo Adnet, Sabrina Sato and Charles Henrique — introduced Otto
- Marina Person and Cazé Peçanha — introduced OK Go!
- Larissa Riquelme and Ronald Rios — presented Best Live Performance
- Léo Santanna — presented MTV Bet
- Marcelo Adnet as Joel Santana, Dani Calabresa as Luciana Gimenez and Laura Fontana (Mini Lady Gaga) — presented Best International Act
- Roberto Justus — presented Best New Act
- Fudêncio — presented Best Game
- Raul Gil and Gui Santana as Raul Gil — presented Video of the Year
- Tatá Werneck as Fernandona and Carol Ribeiro — presented Web Hit of The Year
- Christian Chávez — presented Webstar of The Year
- Vanessa Hadi and Dedé from Scracho — presented Best International Bet and Best Electronic Music
- Funérea — presented Best Pop and Best MPB
- Fudêncio, Conrado and Funérea — presented Best Rap and Best Rock
- Danilo Gentili, Anderson Silva and Júnior Cigano — presented Hit of The Year
- Marcelo Adnet and Neymar — presented Act of the Year
