= Mallu Magalhães (disambiguation) =

Mallu Magalhães (born 1992) is a Brazilian singer, songwriter and musician.

Mallu Magalhães may also refer to:

- Mallu Magalhães (2008 album)
- Mallu Magalhães (2009 album)
- Mallu Magalhães (DVD), 2008
