= Mallu Magalhães discography =

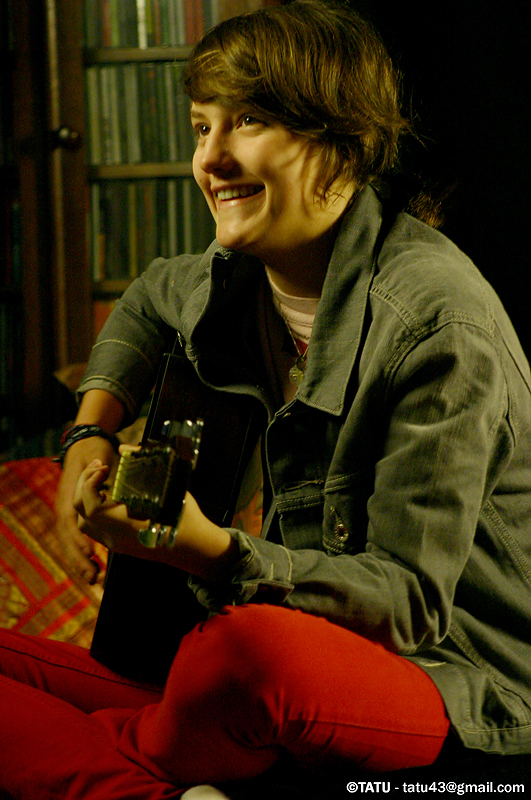
- Studio albums: 2
- Singles: 5
- Video albums: 1
- Music videos: 5

The discography of Mallu Magalhães, a Brazilian Folk singer, consists of two studio albums, one live albums, five singles as a lead artist, one collaborations with Marcelo Camelo and one video albums.

In 2008 she released her first eponymous album and in 2009 she released her second album, also self-titled.

She already has five singles released, and the most famous is Tchubaruba.

== Albums ==
=== Studio albums ===
Year	Album details
2008	Mallu Magalhães: Released: November 15, 2008; Label: Agência de Música, Microservice; Format: CD, digital download
2009	Mallu Magalhães: Released: December 8, 2009; Label: Agência de Música, Sony Music; Format: CD, digital download
2011	Pitanga: Released: September 30, 2011; Label: Agência de Música, Sony Music; Format: CD, digital download
2017	Vem: Released: June 9, 2017; Label: Sony Music; Format: CD, digital download

=== Compilations ===
Year	Album details
2013	Highly Sensitive: Released: October 1, 2013; Label: Agência de Música, Microservice; Format: CD, digital download

=== Video albums ===
Year	Album details
2009	Mallu Magalhães: Released: 2009; Label: Agência de Música; Format: DVD

Notes

- These albums did not reach any of the charts in Brazil.

== Singles ==
=== As lead artist ===
List of singles as lead artist, with selected chart positions, showing year released and album name
Year	Title	Peak chart positions	Album
Year	Title	BRA	Album
2008	"J1"	31	Mallu Magalhães (First album)
2008	"Tchubaruba"	23	Mallu Magalhães (First album)
2009	"O Preço da Flor"	71	Mallu Magalhães (First album)
2009	"Vanguart"	93	Mallu Magalhães (First album)
2010	"Shine Yellow"	72	Mallu Magalhães (Second album)
2010	"Nem Fé Nem Santo"	90	Mallu Magalhães (Second album)
2012	"Velha e Louca"	14	Pitanga
2012	"Sambinha Bom"	85	Pitanga
2016	"Casa Pronta"	54	Vem
2017	"Você Não Presta"	15	Vem
2017	"Navegador"	80	Vem
2017	"Será Que Um Dia"	—	Vem
2017	"Vai e Vem"	—	Vem

== Other appearances ==
Year	Song	Album
2009	"Janta" (Marcelo Camelo featuring Mallu Magalhães)	Sou
2009	"How D'You Do" (originally by Paul McCartney)	Beatles 69 Vol.2 - O Outro Lado Da Abbey Road
2009	"It Ain't Me Babe" (originally by Bob Dylan)	Letra & Música: Bob Dylan

Notes

- These albums did not reach any of the charts in Brazil.

== Music videos ==
- J1 (2008)
- Tchubaruba (2008)
- O Preço da Flor (2009)
- Vanguart (2009)
- Shine Yellow (2009)
