= List of Mallu Magalhães concert tours =

The Brazilian singer Mallu Magalhães toured Brazil in 2008 and 2010, and briefly visited Portugal in January 2009. These tours were to support her first two studio albums, Mallu Magalhães (2008) and Mallu Magalhães (2009).

The show consisted of acoustic versions of songs from the album supported and some other singers. Mallu used some props, such as goggles and face painting.

== 2008 ==
Mallu Magalhães Concert Tour
- Tour by Mallu Magalhães
- Official poster for Mallu' 2008 Tour
- Associated album: Mallu Magalhães
- Start date: August 30, 2008
- End date: Juny 27, 2009
- Legs: 3
- No. of shows: 2 in Portugal; 11 in Brazil; 13 in total

Mallu Magalhães concert chronology
- 2008 tour (2008/2009); "2010 tour" (2010)

=== Setlist ===
==== Main setlist ====
1. "It Ain´t Me Babe" (cover of Bob Dylan)
2. "Get to Denmark"
3. "Have You Ever"
4. "You Know You´ve Got"
5. "Meia Colorida"
6. "Vanguart"
7. "Her Day Will Come"
8. "It Takes Two to Tango"
9. "Girassóis"
10. "Folsom Prison Blues" (cover of Johnny Cash)
11. "Town of Rock and Roll"
12. "J1"
13. "Faz"
14. "O Preço da Flor"
15. "Noil"
16. "Sualk"
17. "Dry Freezing Tongue"
18. "I do Believe"
19. "Angelina, Angelina"
20. "Don't You Look Back"
21. "Tchubaruba"
22. "My Honey"
23. "You Always Say"
24. "Sweet Mom"

==== Festival setlist ====
1. "Vanguart"
2. "J1"
3. "O Preço da Flor"
4. "Tchubaruba"

=== Tour dates ===
Date	City	Country	Venue
South America
July 5, 2008	Santos	Brazil	SESC
July 12, 2008	Rio de Janeiro	Brazil	Circo Voador
July 26, 2008	Rio de Janeiro	Brazil	Mistura Fina
August 30, 2008	São Paulo	Brazil	Festival Eletronika
October 7, 2008	São Paulo	Brazil	Meta Café
October 11, 2008	Florianópolis	Brazil	MySpace Music Tour
November 11, 2008	São Paulo	Brazil	Festival Planeta Terra
November 15, 2008	Porto Alegre	Brazil	Festival Gig Rock
November 18, 2008	São Paulo	Brazil	Bourbon Street
November 22, 2008	Rio de Janeiro	Brazil	Morro da Urca
November 29, 2008	Salvador	Brazil	Praça Tereza Batista
December 13, 2008	Vila Velha	Brazil	Ginásio do Marista
Europe
January 22, 2009	Lisbon	Portugal	Music Box
January 23, 2009	Porto	Portugal	BlueStore
South America
March 26, 2009	Porto Alegre	Brazil	Teatro Bourbon Country
April 25, 2009	São Paulo	Brazil	Citibank Hall
May 23, 2009	Florianópolis	Brazil	Centro Integrado de Cultura (CIC)
Juny 27, 2009	Campinas	Brazil	Cooperativa Brasil

=== Broadcasts and recordings ===
- The October 7, 2008 show in São Paulo was recorded for the Mallu Magalhães Live DVD.

== 2010 ==
Mallu Magalhães Concert Tour
- Tour by Mallu Magalhães
- Associated album: Mallu Magalhães
- Start date: January 22, 2010
- End date: April 9, 2010 (to date)
- Legs: 1
- No. of shows: 7 in Brazil; 7 in total

Mallu Magalhães concert chronology
- "2008 tour" (2008/2009); "2010 tour" (2010)

=== Setlist ===
==== Festival setlist ====
1. "Vanguart"
2. "J1"
3. "O Preço da Flor"
4. "Tchubaruba"
5. "Shine Yellow"
6. "Pode Vir Quente Que Estou Fervendo" (cover Erasmo Carlos)
7. "É Você Que Tem"

=== Tour dates ===
Date	City	Country	Venue
South America
January 22, 2010	Salvador	Brazil	Festival de Verão de Salvador
January 24, 2010	Guarujá	Brazil	Comboio Oi FM
February 22, 2010	Ribeirão Preto	Brazil	Pocket Show – FNAC
February 26, 2010	São Paulo	Brazil	Pocket Show – FNAC
March 4, 2010	Campinas	Brazil	Pocket Show – FNAC
March 19, 2010	São Paulo	Brazil	Auditório Ibirapuera
April 9, 2010	Rio de Janeiro	Brazil	Circo Voador
