= 2009 MTV Video Music Brazil =

Edition of music award ceremony

- Date: October 01, 2009
- Location: Credicard Hall
- Hosted by: Marcelo Adnet

Television/radio coverage
- Network: MTV Brasil

The 2009 MTV Video Music Brazil was hosted by Marcelo Adnet and took place at the Credicard Hall. It awarded the best in Brazilian music, popular culture and internet culture in the year of 2009. Despite being a Brazilian awards show, the 2009 VMB included live performances by American rapper Ja Rule (in duet with Brazilian pop singer Wanessa) and Scottish rock band Franz Ferdinand, who were also nominated in the Best International Act category (but lost to Britney Spears). The 2009 VMB had over 20 categories, the largest number in the history of the show; therefore, part of the awards were delivered in a special show named "VMB Antes" ("VMB Before"), presented some hours before the main event, including small performances by the 2009 VMB Dream Band winners (the last year where the Dream Band category was maintained; in 2010 the category was extinguished) and winners in other categories.

== Nominations ==
Winners are in bold text.

=== Act of the Year ===
- **Fresno**
- Jota Quest
- Mallu Magalhães
- Marcelo D2
- Nando Reis
- NX Zero
- Paralamas do Sucesso
- Pitty
- Seu Jorge
- Skank

=== Video of the Year ===
- Black Drawing Chalks — "My Favorite Way"
- Cachorro Grande — "Dance Agora"
- Emicida — "Triunfo"
- Jupiter Apple — "Modern Kid"
- Mallu Magalhães — "Vanguart"
- Nando Reis — "Ainda Não Passou"
- Nervoso e os Calmantes — "Eu Que Não Estou Mais Aqui"
- O Rappa — "Súplica Cearense"
- Pública — "Casa Abandonada"
- **Skank — "Sutilmente"**

=== Hit of the Year ===
- **NX Zero — "Cartas para Você"**
- Pitty — "Me Adora"
- Seu Jorge — "Burguesinha"
- Skank — "Sutilmente"
- Wanessa (featuring Ja Rule) — "Fly"

=== Best New Act ===
- **Banda Cine**
- Copacabana Club
- Garotas Suecas
- Glória
- Little Joy

=== Best International Act ===
- Arctic Monkeys
- Beyoncé
- The Black Eyed Peas
- **Britney Spears**
- Franz Ferdinand
- Green Day
- Katy Perry
- Kings of Leon
- Lady Gaga
- Lily Allen

=== MTV Bet ===
- Black Drawing Chalks
- Emicida
- Holger
- Mickey Gang
- **Vivendo do Ócio**

=== Best Pop ===
- **Fresno**
- Jota Quest
- Nando Reis
- Skank
- Wanessa

=== Best Rock ===
- Autoramas
- Cachorro Grande
- **Forfun**
- Pitty
- Strike

=== Best Alternative Rock ===
- Black Drawing Chalks
- Holger
- Móveis Coloniais de Acaju
- Nervosos e Os Calmantes
- **Pública**

=== Best Hardcore ===
- **Dead Fish (band)**
- Devotos
- Garage Fuzz
- Mukeka Di Rato
- Presto?

=== Best MPB ===
- Cérebro Eletrônico
- Céu
- Curumin
- **Fernanda Takai**
- Tiê

=== Best Samba ===
- Arlindo Cruz
- Casuarina
- Diogo Nogueira
- Mariana Aydar
- **Zeca Pagodinho**

=== Best Reggae ===
- **Chimarruts**
- Jimmy Luv
- Lei Di Dai
- Natiruts
- Planta e Raiz

=== Best Rap ===
- Emicida
- Kamau
- **MV Bill**
- Relatos da Invasão
- RZO

=== Best Instrumental ===
- Eu serei a Hiena
- Hurtmold
- Macaco Bong
- **Pata de Elefante**
- Retrofoguetes

=== Best Electronic ===
- Boss in Drama
- Database
- Mixhell
- **N.A.S.A.**
- The Twelves

=== Best Live Act ===
- Arlindo Cruz
- Little Joy
- Marcelo Camelo
- Móveis Coloniais de Acaju
- **Paralamas do Sucesso**

=== Best Musical Documentary or Movie ===
- Coração Vagabundo
- Dub Echoes
- Loki
- Simonal - Ninguém Sabe o Duro que Dei
- **Titãs - A Vida Até Parece Uma Festa**

=== Web Hit of the Year ===
- Caetano Caindo
- Funk do Joel Santana
- **Os Seminovos — "Escolha Já Seu Nerd"**
- Stefhany — "Crossfox"
- Xuxu — "Pantera Cor-de-rosa"

=== Blog of the Year ===
- Brainstorm 9
- Blog do Juca Kfouri
- **Jovem Nerd**
- Papel Pop
- Sedentário & Hiperativo

=== Twitter of the Year ===
- Danilo Gentili
- Mano Menezes
- **Marcos Mion**
- MariMoon
- Tessália Serighelli

=== Game of the Year ===
- Braid
- Fallout 3
- LittleBigPlanet
- The Beatles: Rock Band
- **The Sims 3**

=== Dream Band ===
- Vocals: Lucas Silveira (Fresno)
- Guitar: Martin Mendonça (Pitty)
- Bass: Rodrigo Tavares (Fresno)
- Drums: Duda Machado (Pitty)

== Performances ==
- Móveis Coloniais de Acaju — "O Tempo"
- Erasmo Carlos (featuring Nervoso, Gabriel Thomaz and Érika Martins) — "Cover"/"É Proibido Fumar"
- Wanessa (featuring Ja Rule) — "Fly"
- Massacration (featuring Falcão) — "The Mummy"
- Vivendo do Ócio — "Fora Mônica"
- Pitty — "Me Adora"
- Franz Ferdinand — "No You Girls"
