= Tigrão Big Tiger =

Brazilian rapper

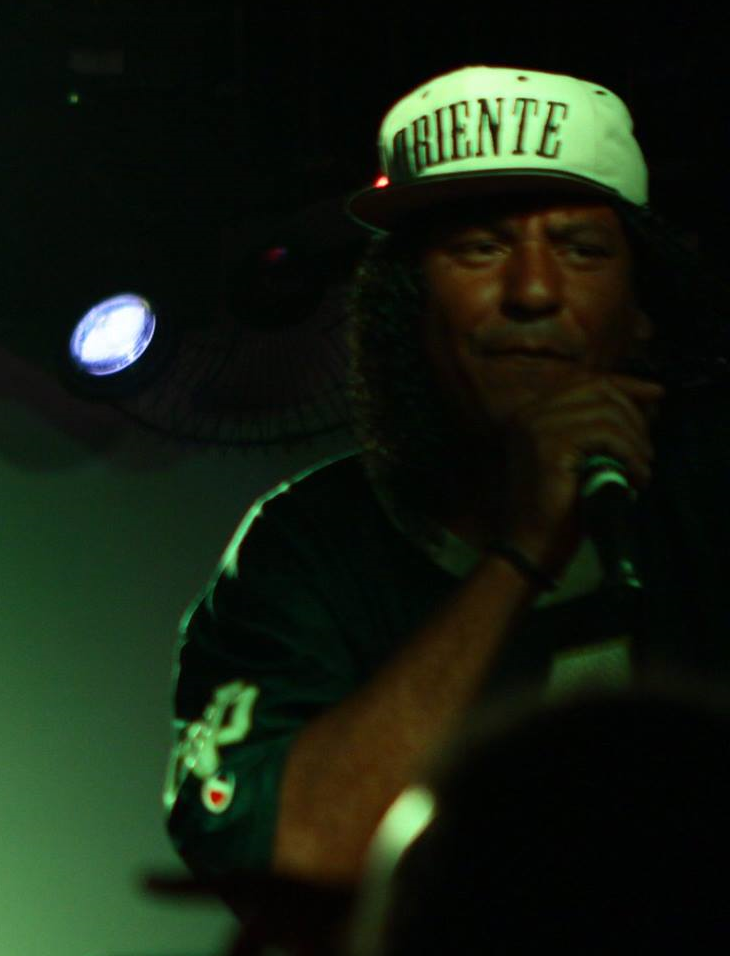
- Big Tiger in 2016

Background information
- Born: Alexandre Teixeira; July 2, 1970 (age 56); Rio de Janeiro, Brazil
- Genre: Hip hop
- Occupations: Rapper; singer; songwriter
- Instruments: Rapping
- Years active: 1996–present (solo)
- Label: Hostil Records

Alexandre Teixeira, also known as Tigrão Big Tiger (Born in Rio de Janeiro) is a Brazilian rapper. Throughout his career, he recorded several songs with fellow Brazilian rapper Speedfreaks.

== Biography ==
In 1996, Big Tiger started out his music career when he formed his first Rap group called Discriminados do Rap, in collaboration with Marcelo Texeira. In 1998, he was invited to form the group Ciência Rimática with Facão and DJ Mohamed at Zueira Hip Hop. The group lasted until 2004, at which time Tigrão Big Tiger began to attend various freestyle sessions and Hip Hop events.

In 2005, he formed Aliança 21 with Mahal and DJ Arra, and later DJ Erick Scratch joined them. At the time, they released an album called Apocalipse. The group lasted from 2005 to 2009, and in the meantime Tigrão was invited to provide back vocals on Black Alien's album Babylon By Gus. Later Tigrão was invited to form a partnership with Speedfreaks, as a result he recorded two songs and released two video clips entitled Niterói São Gonçalo and Trocando Idéia, respectively. In 2008, Tigrão recorded various unreleased songs with Speedfreaks in São Paulo, before Speedfreaks died in 2010.

Big Tiger released his first solo album called Evolução with DJ and Beatmaker Guilla Beatmático. The album was heavily played in important events such as Liga dos MC's, Batalha do Real, Porão Hip Hop, Hip Hop Circo Voador, Cufa Aracaju Sergipe, Westcost Lapa, Tourbillon, Peripheral Movement at SESC Niterói, Hip Hop Station, among others.

Big Tiger has already opened for important artists and groups such as: Planet Hemp, Thaide SP, Luiz Melodia, Nação Zumbi, Black Alien, GOG from Brasília, Mv Bill, Banda Naya with Andrew Tosh at Fundição Progresso, among others. Big Tiger's influences come from Rio de Janeiro's Underground Hip Hop scene, where he initiated his Rap career and joined the music industry. He is known to be an activist and fights for equal rights.

In 2022, Tigrão Big Tiger released his second solo album called "Paz de Espírito", which contains features by rappers such as De Leve and Mahal. The production on "Paz de Espírito" was handled by Emtee, Debug, Guillabeamatico and Renato Musash.

== Discography ==
=== Studio albums ===
- Evolução (2005)
- Paz de Espírito (2022)

=== Videoclipes ===
- 2005 - Correria
- 2008 - São Gonçalo/Niterói (with Speedfreaks)
- 2009 - Trocando Ideia (with Speedfreaks)
- 2018 - Meus Pensamentos (with De Leve)

=== Singles ===
Year	Single	Label	Production
2020	Vivendo na Sagacidade	Hostil Records	
2020	Vencer	Hostil Records	Emtee Beats
2019	Video Game	Hostil Records	Bruno the Bug
2015	Quem Vai, Vai	Hostil Records	Underbeatz
