= 2008 MTV Video Music Brazil =

- Date: October 02, 2008
- Location: Credicard Hall
- Hosted by: Marcos Mion

Television/radio coverage
- Network: MTV Brasil

The 2008 MTV Video Music Brazil was hosted by Marcos Mion and took place at the Credicard Hall. Brazilian rock band NX Zero was the big winner of the event. One of the most notable moments was British indie rock band Bloc Party's performance, during which the audience booed the band after noticing they were lip-synching and mimicking to a pre-recorded track instead of singing and playing live. 2008 VMB also had American singer Ben Harper opening the ceremony performing alone, before being joined by Brazilian singer Vanessa da Mata for a second performance.

== Nominations ==
winners are in bold text.

=== Act of the Year ===
- Bonde do Rolê
- Cachorro Grande
- Cansei de Ser Sexy
- Charlie Brown Jr.
- Fresno
- Mallu Magalhães
- Nando Reis
- **NX Zero**
- Pitty
- Vanessa da Mata

=== Video of the Year ===
- Bonde do Rolê — "Solta O Frango"
- Cachorro Grande — "Roda Gigante"
- Cansei de Ser Sexy — "Rat Is Dead"
- Charlie Brown Jr. — "Pontes Indestrutíveis"
- CPM 22 — "Escolhas, Provas e Promessas"
- Marcelo D2 — "Desabafo"
- Nação Zumbi — "Bossa Nostra"
- **NX Zero — "Pela Última Vez"**
- O Rappa — "Monstro Invisível"
- Pitty — "De Você"

=== Hit of the Year ===
- Charlie Brown Jr. — "Pontes Indestrutíveis"
- Fresno — "Uma Música"
- **NX Zero — "Pela Última Vez"**
- Strike — "Paraíso Proibido"
- Vanessa da Mata and Ben Harper — "Boa Sorte/Good Luck"

=== Best New Act ===
- Mallu Magalhães
- Ponto de Equilíbrio
- Roberta Sá
- **Strike**
- Vanguart

=== Best International Act ===
- Amy Winehouse
- Britney Spears
- Coldplay
- Justice
- Katy Perry
- Kanye West
- Madonna
- MGMT
- **Paramore**
- Radiohead

=== MTV Bet ===
- 3namassa
- China
- **Garotas Suecas**
- Rosana Bronk's
- Turbo Trio

=== Best Live Act ===
- Cachorro Grande
- Mallu Magalhães
- Paralamas do Sucesso e Titãs
- **Pitty**
- Zeca Pagodinho

=== Web Hit of the Year ===
- A Drag a Gozar
- A Gaga de Ilhéus
- As Meninas de Inri Cristo
- **Dança do Quadrado**
- MC Créu

=== Video You Made ===
- Eduardo Henrique with a version of "Boa Sorte/Good Luck"
- **Fábio Vianna with a version of "Uma Música"**
- Geraldo José with a version of "Paraíso Proibido"
- Rafael Gonçalves Micheletto with a version of "Pela Última Vez"
- Vinícius Neo with a version of "Boa Sorte/Good Luck"

=== Dream Band ===
- Vocals: Marcelo D2
- Guitar: Chimbinha (Banda Calypso)
- Bass: Bi Ribeiro (Os Paralamas do Sucesso)
- Drums: João Barone (Os Paralamas do Sucesso)

== Performances ==
- Ben Harper and the Innocent Criminals — "In The Colors"
- Vanessa da Mata and Ben Harper — "Boa Sorte/Good Luck"
- Marcelo D2 — "Desabafo"
- Nove Mil Anjos — "Chuva Agora"
- Bloc Party — "Talons"/"Banquet"
- Bonde do Rolê — "Solta O Frango"/"Office Boy"/"Mais Uma Vez"
- 2008 VMB Dream Band winners — "Acelerou"
- Pitty and Cascadura — "Inside A Beer Bottle"
- Fresno and Chitãozinho & Xororó — "Evidências"
