= Banda do Mar =

- Origin: Rio de Janeiro, Brazil
- Genres: MPB, bossa nova, alternative rock, indie rock
- Years active: 2013–present
- Label: Sony Music
- Members: Marcelo Camelo; Mallu Magalhães; Fred Ferreira
- Website: bandadomar.com.br

Banda do Mar is a Brazilian band announced in May 2014 by Marcelo Camelo (vocals/guitar), his wife Mallu Magalhães (vocals/guitar) and Fred Ferreira (drums). The name of the band is Portuguese for "Band of the Sea".

Their debut eponymous album was released in August 2014 and they went on tour since then in support of the record. On August 24, 2015, the band announced they were going on hiatus after the last concert of the tour, held in Lisbon on September 9, 2015.

Mallu and Marcelo have been working together in their respective solo careers since they began dating in 2008, when Mallu sang "Janta" on Marcelo's debut solo album, Sou. "Janta" was chosen by Rolling Stone Brasil as the best Brazilian track that year. Later, in 2011, Marcelo Camelo produced Mallu's third album, Pitanga.

== Discography ==
Studio Albums

Album Title	Album details	Peak chart positions	
Album Title	Album details	BRA	POR
Banda do Mar	Released: August 5, 2014; Label: Sony Music; Format: CD, LP, Digital download	1	2

== Singles ==
List of singles, with positions in the selected charts.
Single	Year	Charts	Album
Single	Year	BRA	Album
"Mais Ninguém"	2014	3	Banda do Mar
"Hey Nana"	2014	—	Banda do Mar
"Muitos Chocolates"	2014	—	Banda do Mar
"Dia Clarear"	2014	12	Banda do Mar
"—" denota singles que não entraram nas paradas musicais ou não foram lançados no país.

== Band members ==
Current Members

- Marcelo Camelo – lead vocals, guitar
- Mallu Magalhães – lead vocals, guitar, shaker
- Fred Ferreira – drums

Touring Members

- Gabriel Bubu – guitar
- Marcos Gerez – bass
