= MC Marechal =

Brazilian rapper & composer (born 1981)

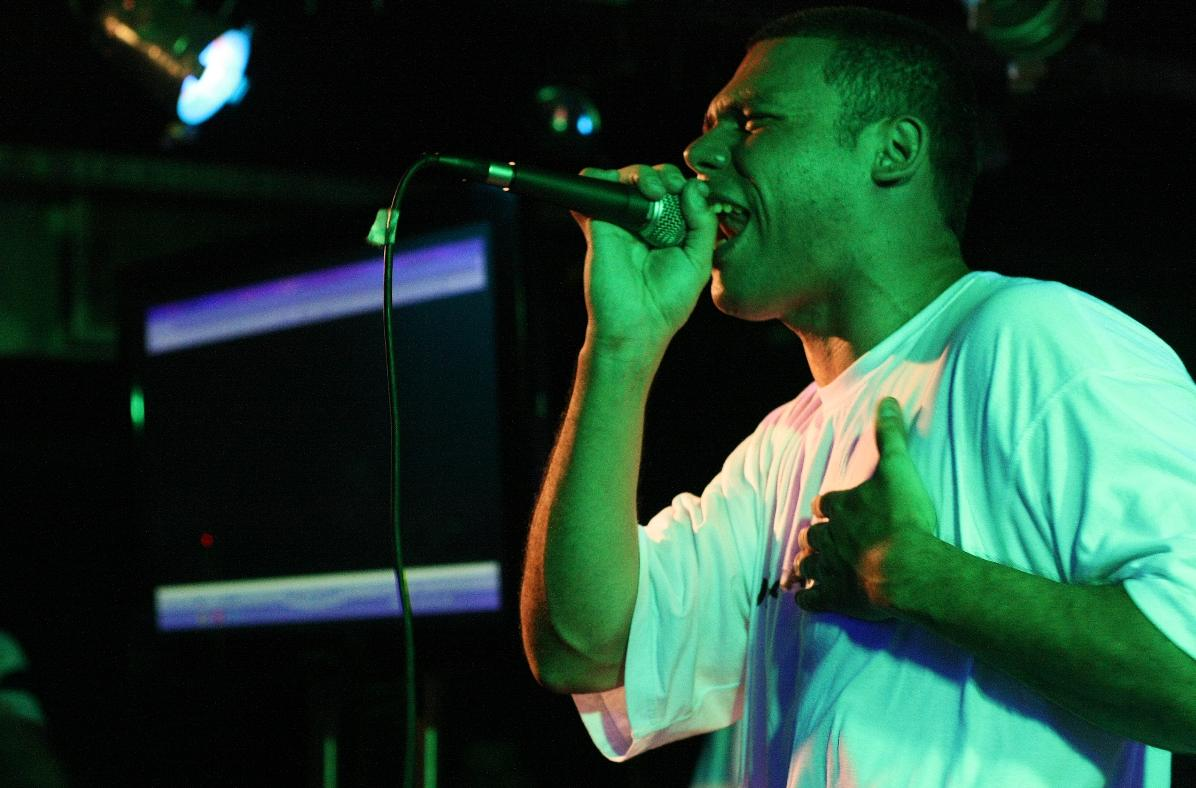

Background information
- Born: Rodrigo Cerqueira de Souza Machado Vieira; 1981 (age 44–45)
- Origin: Niterói, Rio de Janeiro, Brazil
- Genre: Hip hop
- Occupations: Rapper, composer
- Years active: 1998–present

Rodrigo Cerqueira de Souza Machado Vieira (born 1981), better known by his stage name MC Marechal or simply Marechal, is a Brazilian rapper and composer. He is considered to be a pioneer in the Brazilian Underground Hip Hop genre, being a founding member of the group Quinto Andar.

== Career ==
Marechal began his career in Rap battles in 1998, in which he stood out. Afterwards, he joined the now extinct group Quinto Andar in 1999, along with artists such as De Leve and Shawlin. However, he was the first to leave the group to pursue a solo career. He recorded with Marcelo D2 and Fernandinho Beatbox the song "Loadeando", which reached national prominence.

Marechal has several affiliations with MCs, such as MC Gutierrez, Marcelo D2, Rashid, among others.

Emicida released his EP "Sua Mina Ouve Meu Rap Tambem", which alludes to lyrics written by Marechal where he disses rapper Cabal.

Marechal is known for frequently using the phrase Um Só Caminho, which is one of his ideologies. Furthermore, Marechal is also a music producer.

He has also recorded with rapper Sant and has done several shows touring Brazil.

== Batalha do Conhecimento ==
Conceived by MC Marechal, the Batalha do Conhecimento ('knowledge battle') event aims to enhance the lyrical content in rap battles. Instead of exchanging insults with rival artists, in what are known as blood battles, the event proposes to emphasize rhymes about new concepts, education, culture, politics. Since 2014, the events have taken place at the Museu de Arte do Rio in Rio de Janeiro's port area, challenging artists to interact with exhibitions at the museum.

The themes for the battles are chosen on the spot by the audience. Instead of just rhyming, the rapper needs to teach, spread some content, and show knowledge about specific topics.

== Discography ==
=== Singles ===
- "Espírito Independente" (2007)
- "Sangue Bom" (2010)
- "A Rua Sabe"
- "A Guerra"
- "Vamos voltar a Realidade"
- "Sangue Bom"
- "Viagem"
- "Griot" (2011)
- "VVAR"
- "Primeiro de Abril"
- Quem Tava Lá? (with Costa Gold and Luccas Carlos)
