= De Leve =

Brazilian rapper

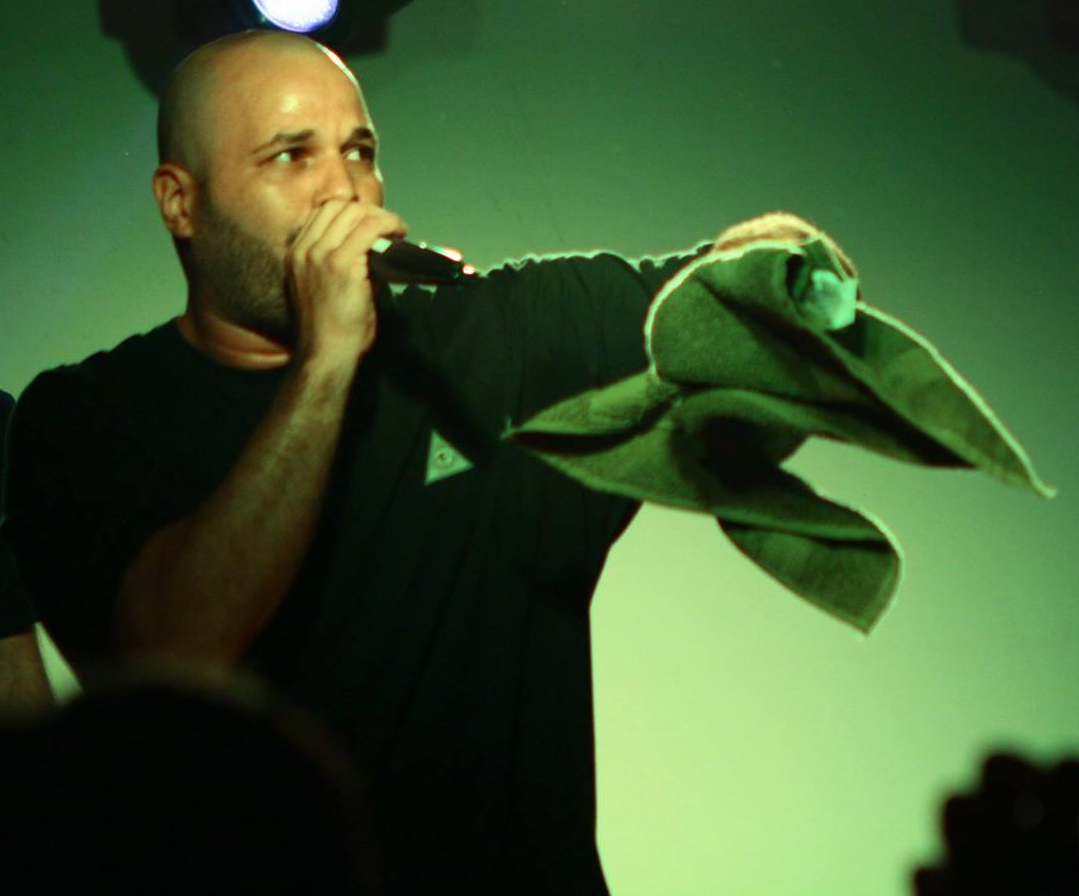
- De Leve at the Bang Brasiliense show.

Background information
- Born: Ramon Moreno de Freitas e Silva; Rio de Janeiro, Brazil
- Genre: Hip hop
- Occupations: Rapper, singer-songwriter
- Instruments: Rapping
- Years active: 1998–present (solo)
- Label: Tomba Records
- Formerly of: Quinto Andar

De Leve (born Ramon Moreno de Freitas e Silva in Rio de Janeiro) is a Brazilian rapper.

== Biography ==
Ramon Moreno de Freitas e Silva, better known by his artistic name De Leve, is a rapper from the state of Rio de Janeiro, in the municipality of Niterói. He is commonly remembered for his sarcastic rhymes and criticisms of the Brazilian media and professionals, as well as his rap instrumentals with various other styles of music. He was a member of the extinct Underground Hip Hop group Quinto Andar and besides his solo career, he is also the lead vocalist of Banda Leme. His last work was the EP "Estalactite", which was released by De Leve on YouTube and SoundCloud, respectively. Perhaps his most popular project is the album "Manifesto 1/2 171", which was titled after fellow Brazilian rapper Marcelo D2's clothes company.

== Music career ==
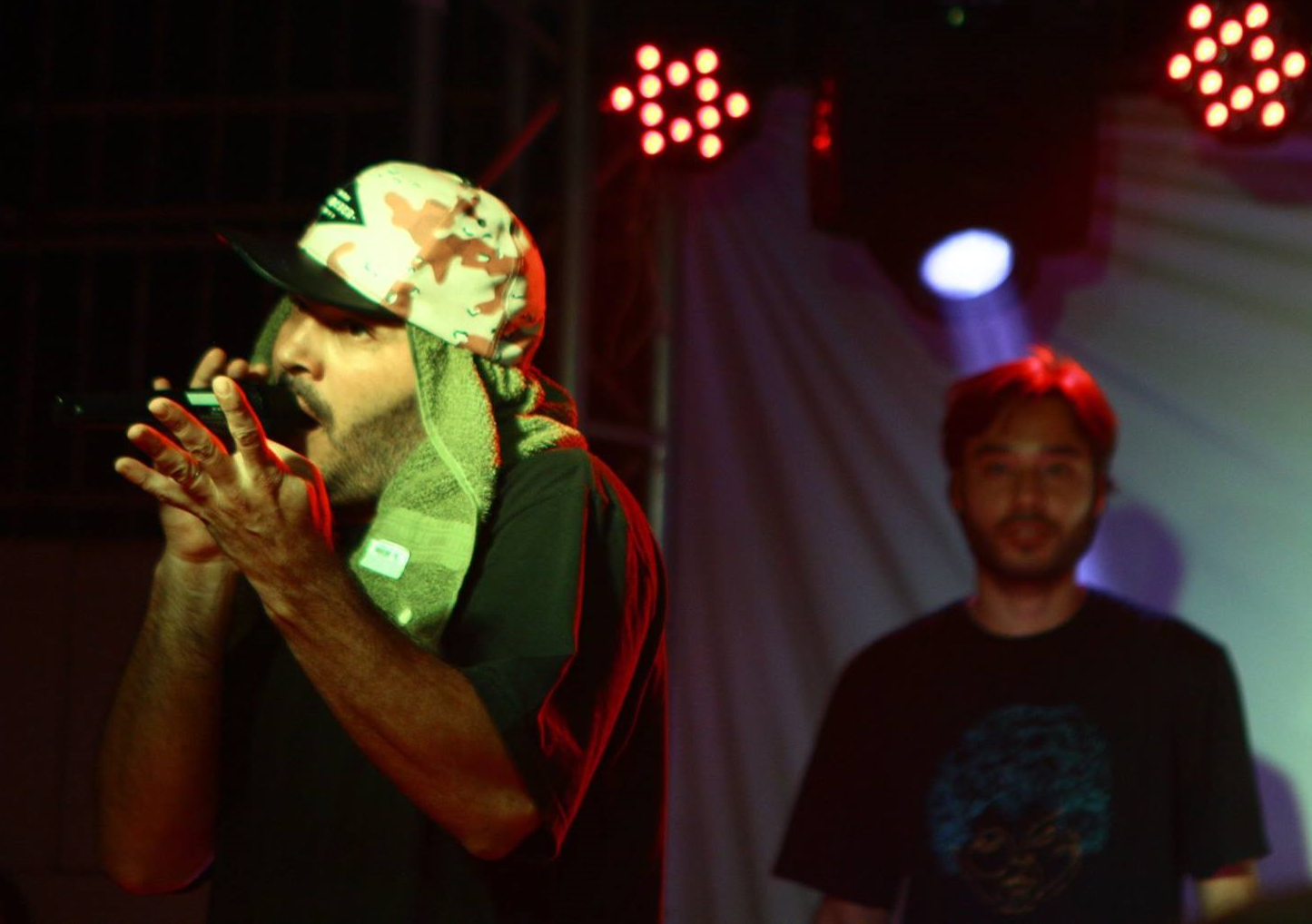
De Leve with music producer Emtee Beats at a show in Brasília.

His career as a rapper began in 2000, with his participation on the album "Zoeira Hip Hop", created by Elza Cohen, who also promoted a party of the same name, held in the neighborhood of Lapa. That same year, De Leve founded, together with fellow cariocas MC Marechal and DJ Castro, the Quinto Andar group. The collective gained notoriety in the national Underground Hip Hop scene mainly for their unusual lyrics and for their unique speed flow. The music video for "Eu Rimo Na Direita / Som Pra Pista" was constantly featured on the show "Yo!" aired on MTV Brasil.

In 2001, the first solo recordings of De Leve were released. They were placed on an EP called "Introduzindo De Leve", in collaboration with Quinto Andar. The EP is one of the first musical works to be made available virtually and reach a good media visibility. Content distribution was done through the Napster sharing program.

Two years later, the rapper's first album, titled "O Estilo Foda-se", was released. The album was generally well received in the media and was also widely distributed on the internet, even though it was distributed by the major recording company Sony Music. The artist himself, at the opening of the cd, encourages illegal downloading of the work by saying "It can be downloaded, it's for the internet". Ironically, on account the title, the album, for the most part, attacks the stereotypes and market vices promoted by the mass media. In the album, De Leve talks about the Brazilian music scene. De Leve appeared on the Brazilian television show Altas Horas, on the channel Rede Globo. Subsequently, the album was re-released with an edition that also included the rapper's first EP.

His album "Manifesto 1/2 171" was released in 2006. In less than two months, there was an estimated nine thousand downloads of the album.

In 2009, on the second edition of the Campus Party Brasil De Leve and his band had to cease their presentation due to the lyrics from their song "Diploma" ("Pega o diploma e limpa sua bunda").

In 2010, he participated on the television show "Comédia MTV", with the track "Rap da Realidade", along with Rafael Queiroga. In 2013, after sometime away from the Hip Hop scene, De Leve plans to return with some new projects.

In 2014, he recorded a song with the group Costa Gold called "Nego Tu Sabe?", while in 2016, he participated in the Brasiliense album "Beat Peso & Papo Reto", being a featured artist on the song "Espírito Pirata".

In 2016, De Leve played at the "Bang em Festa" event at Brasília along with Tigrão Big Tiger and Emtee Beats.

== Discography ==
=== Studio albums ===
- Estilo Foda-se (2003)
- Manifesto ½ 171 (2006)
- De Love (2009)
- Estalactite (2014)
- Mantendo o Rap Vivo (2025)

=== EP's ===
- Introduzindo De Leve (2001)

=== Compilations ===
- Piratão (with Quinto Andar) (2005)

=== Features ===
Year	Single	Artist	Production
2009	UTI	Speedfreaks	Speed
2014	Las Chicas	Veiga & Salazar	Veiga
2014	Nego Tu Sabe?	Costa Gold	WC Beats
2015	Diário de uma Bicicleta	Lucas Santanna	
2016	Espírito Pirata	Emtee & Zigoto	Emtee
2016	Bola de Ouro	0800 Crew and Tigrão Big Tiger	DJ Bandeira
2018	Flow Madlib	Daniel Shadow	Mestre Xim
2018	Sujo Mermo	Ber Cartel	MT BeatDealer
