= Banda do Mar (album) =

Studio album by Banda do Mar
- Released: August 5, 2014
- Recorded: 2014
- Venue: Paço de Arcos, Portugal
- Studio: Atlantico Blue Studios
- Genre: Pop, Rock, MPB
- Length: 43:50
- Label: Sony Music, NOIZE Record Club
- Producer: Marcelo Camelo; Mallu Magalhães; Fred Ferreira

Singles from Banda do Mar
- 1. "Mais Ninguém" Released: August 5, 2014; 2. "Hey Nana" Released: August 5, 2014; 3. "Muitos Chocolates" Released: August 12, 2014; 4. "Dia Clarear" Released: August 18, 2014

Banda do Mar is the eponymous debut album of Luso-Brazilian band Banda do Mar, released for digital download on August 5, 2014 under the Sony Music label. The album's physical version was released on 5 September 2014.

The vinyl edition was released as a blue vinyl pressing through the magazine NOIZE (first vinyl discs subscription service in Latin America, and second vinyl manufacturer behind only Brazil Polysom), including in the vinyl pressing is a magazine issue that talks about the debut album.

It was voted the fourth best national disc of 2014 by Rolling Stone Brazil. In 2015, it was nominated for the 16th Latin Grammy Awards in the Best Brazilian Rock Album category, with the track "Mais Ninguém" being nominated for the Best Brazilian Song category.

== Track listing ==
1. "Cidade Nova" (Marcelo Camelo) – 2:56
2. "Mais Ninguém" (Mallu Magalhães) – 2:48
3. "Hey Nana" (M. Camelo) – 3:05
4. "Muitos Chocolates" (Mallu Magalhães) – 2:19
5. "Pode Ser" (M. Camelo) – 4:27
6. "Mia" (Mallu Magalhães) – 4:09
7. "Dia Clarear" (M. Camelo) – 3:41
8. "Me Sinto Ótima" (Mallu Magalhães) – 3:53
9. "Faz Tempo" (M. Camelo) – 4:22
10. "Seja Como For" (Mallu Magalhães) – 3:39
11. "Solar" (M. Camelo) – 3:32
12. "Vamo Embora" (M. Camelo) – 5:26

== Release history ==
Country	Date	Format(s)	Publisher
Worldwide	5 August 2014	digital download	Sony Music
Brazil	5 September 2014	CD; LP	Sony Music; NRC

== Charts ==
=== Weekly charts ===
Chart (2012)	Peak position
Portuguese Albums (AFP)	14
