= Mallu Magalhães (video) =

Video DVD by Mallu Magalhães
- Released: April 25, 2009
- Recorded: October 7, 2008 at Meta Café (São Paulo, São Paulo)
- Genre: Folk
- Length: 112 mins
- Language: Portuguese
- Label: Microservice
- Producer: Mallu Magalhães

Mallu Magalhães DVD chronology
Mallu Magalhães (2009)	TBA (2010)

Mallu Magalhães is a live DVD by Brazilian folk singer Mallu Magalhães that was released in Brazil on November 20, 2008

== Track listing ==
=== DVD ===
1. "It Ain't Me Babe" (cover of Bob Dylan)
2. "Get to Denmark"
3. "Have You Ever"
4. "You Know You´ve Got"
5. "Meia Colorida"
6. "Vanguart"
7. "Her Day Will Come"
8. "It Takes Two to Tango"
9. "Girassóis"
10. "Folsom Prison Blues" (cover of Johnny Cash)
11. "Town of Rock and Roll"
12. "J1"
13. "Faz"
14. "O Preço da Flor"
15. "Noil"
16. "Sualk"
17. "Dry Freezing Tongue"
18. "I Do Believe"
19. "Angelina"
20. "Don't You Look Back"
21. "Tchubaruba"
22. "My Honey"
23. "You Always Say"
24. "Sweet Mom"
