= Speedfreaks =

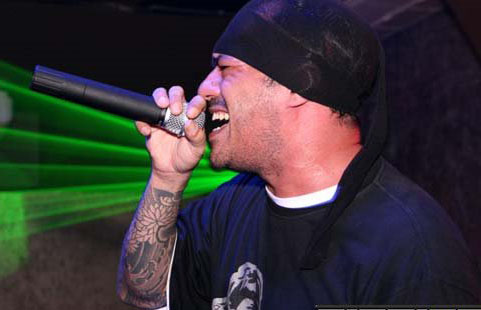

Background information
- Born: Cláudio Márcio de Souza Santos; 1973
- Origin: Niterói, Rio de Janeiro, Brazil
- Died: March 26, 2010 (aged 37)
- Genre: Hip hop
- Occupations: Rapper, musician, composer
- Years active: 1989–2010
- Label: Speed's Hits Independent Records

Cláudio Márcio de Souza Santos, better known by his stage name Speedfreaks or simply Speed, was a Brazilian rapper, composer, musician, and member of the Underground Hip Hop duo Black Alien & Speed. He was a pioneer in the Brazilian Underground Hip Hop genre. His lyrics talked about the reality of the Brazilian streets, dealing with crime, poverty, prejudice, drugs, and money.

According to Isto É magazine, Speedfreaks created "one of the best rap records of recent times". He died on March 26, 2010.

== Career ==
Speedfreaks initiated his career in 1989, Niterói. He started performing with Rap freestyles, and at local shows, typically as a featured guest. He wrote his first rap song, "Sinistro", in the early 1990s. His second song was "Eu Sou o Capeta".

In 1993, he released his demotape called Speedfreaks, with former musical partner Gustavo Black Alien. During the same year, he participated in the compilation album No Major Babies, with the song "Hit Hard Hip Hop" released in Brazil, Europe and the United States. He was featured in Planet Hemp's album Usuário.

In 1996, he released his first solo album called De Macaco on an independent label.

From 1997 to 1998, he released several songs on websites such as Som da Glock and Timoneiro. In 1999, along with Gustavo Black Alien, he formed the Hip Hop duo Black Alien & Speed, which debuted with the song "Guerrilha Verbal". Speedfreaks had a feature on Marcelo D2's first solo album, Eu Tiro é Onda, specifically in the song "Império Contra Ataca".

In 2000, he recorded the album Na Face with São Paulo producer Carlo Bartollini, released independently. He recorded with Fernanda Abreu the song "O Som do Sim", which appeared on Herbert Vianna's album. That same year, he was featured on the albums Tributo a Luiz Gonzaga and Baião de Vira Mundo.

In 2001, Speed released his album Expresso, which featured Rappin' Hood and Otto. Along with Black Alien, he released one of the duo's greatest hit songs: "Quem que Caguetou?", which was also released in Europe. It received remixes from Afrika Bambaataa and Fat Boy Slim, and was re-recorded in the United States under the title "Follow Me, Follow Me".

In 2003, he released the instrumental album Sangue Sob o Sol. Still in 2003, after various discussions with Black Alien, the duo ended. In 2006, he released the album Só o Beginço, which featured Rhossi, from Pavilhão 9.

In 2008, Speedfreaks released a new project called Meu Nome é Velocidade, which featured singer BNegão in the song "Você Morreu". The following year, he released De Volta no Jogo, through his independent label, Speed's Hits. He was about to release Remixxx-Speedfreaks Features, a compilation of songs with special appearances by Speed. He recorded the song "Trocando Ideia" with fellow Carioca rapper Tigrão Big Tiger, which was part of the album De Volta no Jogo.

A documentary film about his life was scheduled to be released in 2020.

== Death ==
Santos was found dead on March 26, 2010, in the neighborhood of São Lourenço, Niterói, Rio de Janeiro. According to police, the bodies of Santos and another person were found inside a ditch on Capitão Evangelista street with gunshot wounds. The case was treated as a double homicide. Investigators speculated that he may have been killed by drug dealers who mistook him for a police officer.

== Discography ==
=== Albums ===
- Expresso (2001)
- Sangue Sob o Sol (2003)
- Só o Começo (2006)
- Meu Nome é Velocidade (2008)
- De Volta No Jogo (2009)
- Remixxx-Speedfreaks Featurings Vol. 1 (2009)

=== Video Clips ===
- 2008 – São Gonçalo/Niterói (with Tigrão Big Tiger)
- 2009 – Trocando Ideia (with Tigrão Big Tiger)
- 2010 – Follow Me, Follow Me (with Black Alien)

== See also ==
- List of murdered hip hop musicians
