= Black Alien =

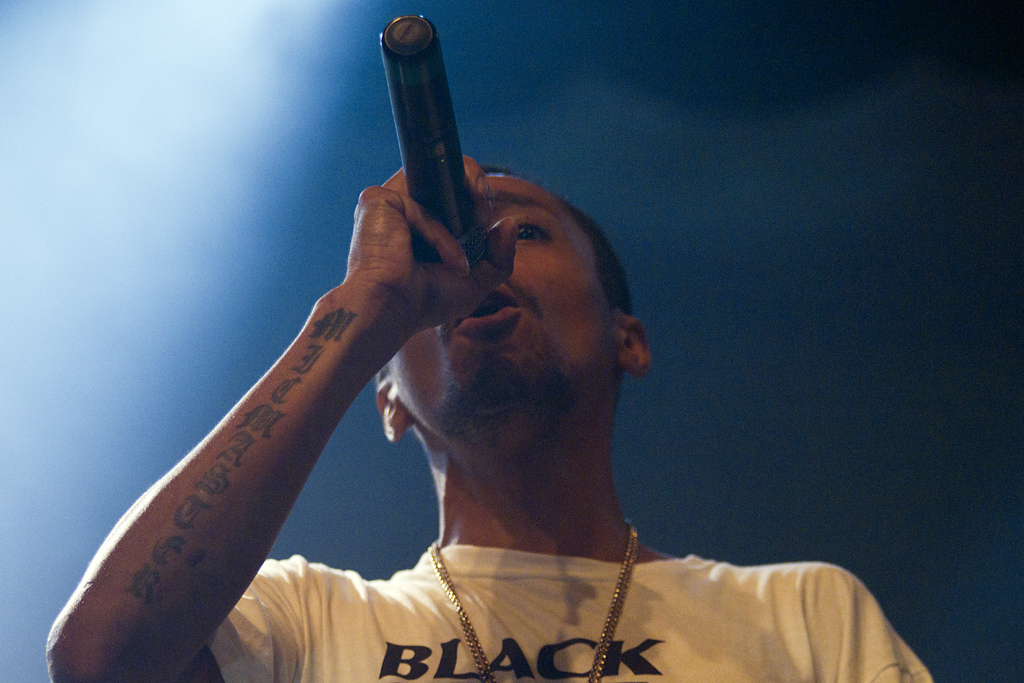

Background information
- Born: Gustavo de Almeida Ribeiro; June 7, 1972 (age 54)
- Origin: São Gonçalo, Rio de Janeiro, Brazil
- Genres: Hip hop; ragga; rock
- Occupations: Rapper, composer
- Years active: 1991–present
- Formerly of: Planet Hemp; Speed Freaks

Gustavo de Almeida Ribeiro (born June 7, 1972), better known by his stage name Black Alien, is a Brazilian rapper and composer. Since 1993, he has created music in several genres, collaborating with various artists, such as Os Paralamas do Sucesso, Forfun, Fernanda Abreu, Raimundos, Banda Black Rio, Pavilhão 9, Marcelinho da Lua, Dead Fish, Sabotage, among others.

== Career ==
Gustavo de Almeida Ribeiro, popularly known as Black Alien, began his career as a rapper invited by fellow MC and musician Speedfreaks, at the time known as Cláudio Marcio. Before rapping, Gustavo was an amateur skateboarder and even competed in some semi-professional championships, but after pursuing a career in music, his life as a skater was set aside. Gustavo studied at the best schools in Niterói, being that he graduated in an Anglo-American school, therefore he speaks English fluently since the age of twelve. A movie fan, he uses notable phrases from movies in his lyrics. At the age of 15, while his friends went to Disney, Gustavo preferred to tour Europe, he went to 8 countries, visited museums, sights and was in contact with different cultures.

== Initial projects ==
=== Speed Freaks ===
In 1991, Speedfreaks heard a song that Gustavo recorded together with DJ Rodriguez, liked it and asked Gustavo to rap in his band, called Speed Freaks (name acquired from a skate movie about Santa Cruz). Gustavo said the following about how the invitation to the band was, this is what Speedfreaks told him: "I went to Rodriguez's house, I heard a rhyme that you made, I liked it. And I'm Speed, I'm cool, I play the bass, I've been a musician for ten years and I want you in my band". The band came to be called Speed Freaks, that's how Gustavo started his life as a rapper. Thus the name of the group Speed Freaks, formed by Cláudio Márcio, who at the time was called Speed Gonzáles, Gustavo who took the name of Bulletproof and DJ Rodriguez. Speed Freaks was a group considered ahead of its time, with lyrics sung in English and Portuguese mixed in an uneven rhythm.

Soon one of the group's songs, "Jah Jah Overall", entered the Revista Trip's tracklist (issue 82), published in September 2000.

With the release of this album, the band became known in the Rio de Janeiro and São Paulo. That same year, Black Alien participated in the compilation album, No Major Babies, which had the song "Hit Hard Hip Hop" released in Brazil, Europe and the United States. The group lasted from 1992 to 1996, constant disagreements and fights were the cause of its eventual breakup.

=== Planet Hemp ===
In 1996, BNegão left Planet Hemp to take over the band Funk Fuckers and there was no one who knew the lyrics and could tour with the band already singing, without needing rehearsals. Bernardo thought about Gustavo, talked to Marcelo D2, and that's how Gustavo joined Planet Hemp in the middle of the tour for the Usuário album.

On the same Black Alien tour, he paid tribute to the independence boys brothers who were of paramount importance for the formation of his career, known for providing the artist with great events and great opportunities.

=== Black Alien & Speed ===
In 1999, Gustavo decided to unite again with Cláudio Márcio, who had already adopted his best known artistic name: SpeedFreaks. They then formed the duo Black Alien & Speed, moved to São Paulo and recorded the album Na Face, with guest appearances by Chorão, Herbert Vianna, Xis, Igor Cavalera, Derek Green, Otto, Rodolfo Abrantes and Digão. Carlo Bartolini was in charge of production.

There is a lot of controversy about this record, which was never released. It is said that a cohesive final result was never reached due to musical differences between the three involved. Others say that each one wanted to contribute with their own personality to the record, being that Speed wanted something more like 1980s-1990s hip-hop, Black Alien wanted something more ragga tending and Carlo Bartolini something more rock´n´roll. There are those who say that after the death of Lucy Vianna, Herbert Vianna's ex-wife, the album's production stagnated, as she was about to take over as the duo's management. The fact is that, even though it was never released, the album is considered one of the best rap albums ever recorded in Brazil. Nowadays, music of the album's music can be found on the internet.

A song recorded by the duo called "Quem Caguetou" appears in a commercial for Nissan's Frontier pickup truck, and was a success in Europe, chosen as the best song for advertisements of the year. This song was remixed by Afrika Bambaataa and Fat Boy Slim, and was re-recorded in the US under the title "Follow Me, Follow Me".

== Solo career ==
In 2004, Black Alien signed a contract with the Deck Disc record label and releases his first solo album, the album Babylon by Gus – Vol. 1: O Ano do Macaco. Recorded in approximately one month, it is still considered by critics to be one of the best rap albums from Brazil. Containing Brazilian Rap classics such as "Mister Niterói", "Na Segunda Vinda" and "Caminhos do Destino".

In 2011, Black Alien announces the release of a new album, after seven years of his first CD, he announced a sequel to Babylon by Gus Vol. I. In 2013, a teaser of the new album was released, entitled Babylon By Gus – Vol. II: No Princípio Era O Verbo.

In November 2012, the day after the announcement of Planet Hemp's reunion for a new tour in Brazil, Black Alien released a song: "Pra Quem A Carapuça Caiba", which contained criticism of the time he spent in the band, as being a time empty in his life, in which they preached one thing and did another, he also criticizes the music industry entrepreneurs during the song, whom he calls "rats and cockroaches", these criticisms are very subliminal and well hidden in the song, therefore neither the production nor the components of Planet Hemp have commented. The theme song for the animated webseries Juninho Play e Família is sung by Black Alien, composed by Samantha Schmütz and Black Alien and produced by DJ PG.

In 2017, Black Alien performed with fellow carioca rapper De Leve in São Paulo, at Sesc Pinheiros.

In 2019, he released Abaixo de Zero: Hello Hell produced entirely by Papatinho.

== Discography ==
=== Albums ===
- 2004 – Babylon By Gus – Vol. I: O Ano Do Macaco
- 2015 – Babylon By Gus – Vol. II: No Príncipio Era O Verbo
- 2019 – Abaixo de Zero: Hello Hell

=== Live albums ===
- 2020 – Babylon By Gus – Vol. I: O Ano do Macaco (Ao Vivo)

=== Videos ===
- 2004 – "Babylon by Gus" – Director: Mauricio Eça e JR Alemão
- 2005 – "Caminhos do destino" – Director : Raul Machado
- 2005 – "Follow me"
- 2006 – "Como eu te quero" – Director: Iuri Bastos
- 2008 – "Tranquilo" – Marcelinho da Lua
- 2011 – "Mister Niterói"
- 2019 – "Que Nem o Meu Cachorro"

=== Singles ===
- 2019 – "Que Nem o Meu Cachorro"
- 2020 – "Chuck Berry"
