= Fudêncio e Seus Amigos =

Brazilian adult animated sitcom

- Genre: Adult animation Animated sitcom Black comedy Science fantasy
- Written by: Thiago Martins; Marco Pavão; Flávia Boggio
- Directed by: Thiago Martins; Marco Pavão; Flávia Boggio
- Country of origin: Brazil
- Original language: Portuguese
- No. of seasons: 6
- No. of episodes: 190

Production
- Running time: 15 minutes
- Production company: Drogaria de Desenhos Animados

Original release
- Network: MTV Brasil
- Release: August 23, 2005 – August 25, 2011

Fudêncio e Seus Amigos (lit. Fudêncio and his friends) was a Brazilian adult animated sitcom created by Thiago Martins, Marco Pavão and Flávia Boggio for MTV Brasil.

The plot consists of adult-themed, intentionally shocking but comedic stories involving a group of five 9-year-old school friends including a punk boy who wears no clothes, a politically correct but extremely unlucky fruit-boy, a drug-addicted depressed girl and a jovial transgender girl.

A total of six seasons featuring 190 episodes were produced and aired in Brazil from August 23, 2005 to August 25, 2011.

== Characters ==
- Fudêncio/Fuckerson - Sarcastic, macabre, cynical, shameless. Fudêncio is far from being an exemplary hero. In any normal school, this little boy with spikes on his head would be in the boardroom. Fudêncio loves rock. Fudêncio is acclaimed as a hero, even with his vocabulary limited to "mimimi mimi" (which everyone understands perfectly, since each beat is a word). Always doing better at everything than Conrad, Fudêncio has already been a pilot, army general, MTV VJ, political revolutionary, etc. (voiced by Thiago Martins)
- Conrado Caqui/Conrad Persimmon - One of the main characters of Fudêncio and his Friends, his head is a persimmon that people often mistakenly believe to be a tomato. He can be considered a complete magnet of all misfortunes in existence. Conrad is 9 years old, and is the son of a tomato with an orange, and most of the time is confused with a tomato. To make his public school student worse, Fudêncio constantly fills the bag of poor Conrad, who most often tries to get his rights or ends up doing something politically correct, which is mistakenly interpreted by various characters, like Lieutenant Kevin Costa, who always calls him "Damn Reggae Youth!". Conrad is hopelessly in love with Zezé Maria, who is a transgender girl. Conrad knows about this, but that does not stop him from loving her. Compared to the other characters, Conrad is the only character who knows how to differentiate good from evil. (Voiced regularly by Fernando Peque from 2005-2007, Felipe Solari from 2008-2009, Geninho Simonetti from 2009 and Cauê Zunchini from 2010-2011)
- Funérea - This little girl hates everything and everyone. She presented a talk show on MTV, Misfortune with Funérea, and interviewed people like Di Ferrero, Ratinho, Marcelo Taz, Tatá Werneck, MariMoon, Dani Calabresa, Fofão, Christian Pior, André Vasco and Mallu Magalhães. She was interviewed by Ronnie Von on All Her Own. (voiced by Flávia Boggio)
- Zé Maria/Mary Joseph - A young transgender girl with a strongly masculine voice. Despite her feminine identity, most characters refer to her in the masculine. Fudêncio, who ignores this detail and has a great passion for her. (Voiced regularly by Cacá Marcondes from 2005-2010 and Ítalo Aguiar from 2010-2011)
- Popoto - No one knows Popoto's true age. The fact that he's doing 4th grade for the eighth time suggests that he is a little older than his friends. But if passing depends on his "quickness" of reasoning, he will do 4th grade a few more times, maybe forever. It is also debatable how he came in 4th grade. In one episode, it is revealed that he is 34 years old, in another that Popoto has been alive since prehistory and - along with Fudêncio - is immortal. Popoto always wears a Che Guevara shirt and is a character who loves to laugh, always after that something speaks, it lives blending the pants besides the same in some episodes to be fond of faeces and still has a tycoon uncle. (voiced by Thiago Martins)
- Safeno - The name gives you a clue. Safeno does not have very good health. Instead of a lunchbox, he always walks around with his serum. But the precarious state of his heart, liver, gut (and all his other organs) do not stop this nice little boy from being part of Fudêncio's adventures. (Voiced by Geninho Simonetti)
- Neguinho - A black boy who is known for almost always being the target of some racial prejudice. Despite his youth, he has the voice of a classically trained baritone. All his relatives are Japanese but he claims not to be adopted and his parents say the same. In an episode in which the students' families were introduced, his family appears next to the taxi driver who serves them, who is also black, which leads everyone to believe that he is the true father of Neguinho. Neguinho is the least profane student in his class. (Voiced regularly by Thiago Martins from 2005 & 2011, Fernando Peque from 2005-2007 and André Aguiar from 2008-2010)
- Cudi Ampola - Better known as Professor Cudi, she is the primary teacher of the majority of the children, students of José Mojica Marins. Her main passion is to distribute negative points during class. But Fudêncio knows how to deceive this teacher so well that he became her favorite pupil. (voiced by Marta Ferreira)
- Officers - Three incompetent policemen working in a police station away from the primary school, who frequently arrest Conrad for unfair reasons.
- Peruíbe - He loves planning methods to take advantage of his schoolmates' problems by promising help - luckily it is not recognized as interference in drawing. (Voiced regularly by Marco Pavão)
- Baltazar Barata - Although he is the tutor of the devilish Fudêncio, Baltazar Barata is a fellow beyond understanding and educated. He also has irresistible charm and chivalry, and is perhaps the only cockroach worshiped by women. So much so that parent-school meetings are the most popular among girls. (Voiced by Thiago Martins)

=== Series overview ===
Season	Episodes	Originally released		
Season	Episodes	First released	Last released	Network
1	20	August 23, 2005	October 2, 2005	MTV Brasil
2	35	May 27, 2006	September 23, 2006	MTV Brasil
3	42	May 15, 2007	December 27, 2007	MTV Brasil
4	40	May 5, 2008	December 4, 2008	MTV Brasil
5	40	March 2, 2009	November 13, 2009	MTV Brasil
Specials	4	June 17, 2010	July 7, 2010	MTV Brasil
6	13	June 2, 2011	August 25, 2011	MTV Brasil

== Episodes ==
=== Season 1 (2005) ===
The series premiered on August 23, 2005. From August 23, 2005 until September 27, 2005, 3 episodes were shown in each broadcast weekly which from October 2, 2005 until December 27, 2007 was changed to 2 episodes per broadcast.

The season was planned to have 24 episodes. However, only 20 episodes were made this year.

No	Airdate	Title
01	August 23	Quiprocó na Lama
02	August 23	Pitoco de Guache
03	August 23	Malhando o Cucuruto
04	August 30	Prenda Prendida Prendada
05	August 30	Cova Redonda
06	August 30	Ciência Caprina
07	September 6	Corrida Mambembe
08	September 6	Astronauta de Árvore
09	September 6	Instituto Médico Legal
10	September 13	Boi nos Aires
11	September 13	Domingo nas FARC
12	September 13	Teatro de Cú é Rola
13	September 20	Cotas de Cocotas
14	September 20	Aparando a Rabiola
15	September 20	Cabecedário
16	September 27	Museu da Ternura
17	September 27	Ponte de Safeno
18	September 27	Tutti-Fruta
19	October 2	Código Popoto
20	October 2	Baltazar é um Barato

=== Season 2 (2006) ===
The 2nd season started on May 27, 2006 and ended on September 23, 2006.

No.	Airdate	Title
01	May 27	Banana Mouche
02	May 27	Guerra Transada
03	June 3	Cativeiro Cativo
04	June 3	Caverna da Dregona
05	June 10	I Wanna Loyô
06	June 10	Gemiocídio
07	June 17	Foi-se o Martelo
08	June 17	U Are Bi Too
09	June 24	Pan de Ramos
10	June 24	O Capeta Mirim
11	July 1	Semana Fashion Week
12	July 1	Bala na Droga
13	July 8	Eu Sou Trabalhador
14	July 8	Frauda Eleitora
15	July 15	Karatê Cudi
16	July 15	Desquitismo
17	July 22	Caso Barata
18	July 22	Reserva Indígena
19	July 29	Teste de DJ
20	July 29	Veneno de Ratazana
21	August 5	Ex-Peologia
22	August 5	Juca Esfirra Aberta
23	August 12	Cassino
24	August 12	Beijaço
25	August 19	Top Goma
26	August 19	Apagando o Sapo
27	August 26	Aparicilds
28	August 26	I Don't Wanna Be Buried In a Pet Sematary
29	September 2	Ordem no Tribunal
30	September 2	Alma Peidada
31	September 9	Bola Gato
32	September 9	Habeas Corpus
33	September 16	Anjo da Lei
34	September 16	Apocalipsio
35	September 23	Ahhtata Rabüzac (retrospective)

=== Season 3 (2007) ===
The 3rd season was shown daily between May 15 and December 27. At the end of this season, Funérea debuted his talk show Infortúnio.

It was planned for this season to just have 36 episodes but was extended later on to 42 episodes.

No.	Airdate	Title
01	May 15	Animação Animada
02	May 15	Tá Tudo Cagado
03	May 16	O Aniversário do Soldado Braice
04	May 16	Reciclando e Andando
05	May 17	Gororoba Putrefata
06	May 17	Quem Sabe Se Fu!!!
07	May 22	Terrorísmio
08	May 22	Moleque Primata
09	May 23	Nipo Neguinho
10	May 23	Planeta Hot
11	May 24	Garota Maravilha
12	May 24	Dança do Caqui
13	May 29	Mensagem Subliminar
14	May 29	Os Kubrusly
15	May 30	Apaixonado Pra Caqui
16	May 30	Futibas Church
17	May 31	Bala Ploft
18	May 31	Concurso Destrua o Caqui
19	December 4	Emorruídos
20	December 4	Apavoro
21	December 5	Quem Vegeta Sempre Alcança
22	December 5	Hóspede Hospedeiro
23	December 6	Polícia Federal
24	December 6	Chavonildo
25	December 11	Caqui Yuppie
26	December 11	Balonismo
27	December 12	Piratas do Carimbo
28	December 12	Super Cocô
29	December 13	Zoofilia
30	December 13	Peruíbe Topa Tudo
31	December 18	Tropa de Aliche
32	December 18	A Boneca do Zezé
33	December 19	Gay!!
34	December 19	João e Maria
35	December 20	Paixonite
36	December 20	Safeno Bizarro
37	December 25	Infortúnio com Cachorro Grande
38	December 25	Especial de Natal
39	December 26	Infortúnio com Fresno
40	December 26	O Pequeno Príncipe
41	December 27	Infortúnio com Supla
42	December 27	Caos Aéreo

=== Season 4 (2008) ===
In the 4th season, Conrado began to be voiced by MTV Brasil's Felipe Solari. Of the 40 episodes, 24 were shown from May 5 to August 21, the rest of the episodes were shown from November 10 to December 4.

No.	Airdate	Title
01	May 5	Fudêncio Mutante
02	May 6	Má Influenza
03	May 7	Planeta Sustentável
04	May 8	O Que Está Acontecendo, Conrado?
05	May 12	Intercâmbio Criminal
06	May 13	Quem Tem Tesão Não Ama
07	May 14	Folclore no Caqui dos Outros é Refresco
08	May 15	Olha Só o Que a Funérea Está Falando
09	May 19	Capeta em Forma de Guri
10	May 20	Champa Avonts
11	May 21	Infortúnio com Wander Wildner
12	May 22	Infortúnio com Felipe Solari
13	May 26	Prástica Pro Provo
14	August 4	A Loira do Cocô
15	August 5	Infortúnio com Nasi
16	August 6	Infortúnio com Zé do Caixão
17	August 7	Infortúnio - Rogério Skylab
18	August 12	Extraterrestre
19	August 13	Cudi Copo
20	August 13	Infortúnio com Mallu Magalhães
21	August 14	Tráfego de Drogas
22	August 18	Gangue do Patrão
23	August 19	Bost
24	August 21	Baratatouille
25	November 10	Infortúnio com Frejat
26	November 11	Infortúnio com Jimmy
27	November 12	Sequestro
28	November 13	Biblioteca Maldita
29	November 17	Infortúnio com Lobão
30	November 18	Infortúnio com Thunderbird
31	November 19	Menino Diabo
32	November 20	Doces ou Travessuras
Fudencio 2000
33	November 24	In Your Tits, Oh Liberty!
34	November 25	The Drag Queen of Troy
35	November 26	Ball Cat
36	November 27	Cry Over the Spilt Milk
37	December 1	Who Have Ass Have Fear
38	December 2	Cudi Baby
39	December 3	Heavy Natal
40	December 4	Pizza Under the Arms!

=== Season 5 (2009) ===
Season 5 started on March 2, 2009. The first ten episodes, shown in the first two weeks of March, were editions of "Infortúnio". The second wave of episodes premiered on May 11 and also lasted two weeks.

No.	Airdate	Title
01	March 2	Infortúnio com Laerte
02	March 3	Infortúnio com Afonso Nigro
03	March 4	Infortúnio com Silvio Luiz
04	March 5	Infortúnio com João Gordo
05	March 6	Infortúnio com Ary Toledo
06	March 9	Infortúnio com Clemente Ribeiro
07	March 10	Infortúnio com Bento
08	March 11	Infortúnio com Gabriel Thomaz
09	March 12	Infortúnio com Japinha
10	March 13	Infortúnio com Roger Moreira
11	May 11	Zezé And The City
12	May 12	Reabilitação
13	May 13	Compra Besta, Compra
14	May 14	Tchubarudããã
15	May 15	Os Segredos da Peida
16	May 16	Meteu o Rito
17	May 19	Uma Cilada Para Cudi Ampola
18	May 20	Uma Criança na Casa Branca
19	May 21	Junior
20	May 22	Fedelhas Superpoderosas
21	August 3	Crééééupúsculo!
22	August 4	Safeno Decide Contar
23	August 5	Um Neguinho na Casa Branca II
24	August 6	A Menina Maluquinha
25	August 7	Aeronave
26	August 10	O Enviadinho do Futuro
27	August 11	Museu do Hippie Sujo
28	August 12	Rei do Pop
29	August 13	Gripe Suína
30	August 14	Standup Tragedy
31	November 2	Infortúnio com Didi Effe
32	November 3	Infortúnio com Pitty
33-36	November 4-6, 9	Infortúnio com ???
37	November 10	Infortúnio com Marcos Mion
38	November 11	Infortúnio com Juca Chaves
39	November 12	Infortúnio com Falcão
40	November 13	Infortúnio com Paulo Ricardo

=== World Cup Specials (2010) ===
Specials sponsored by The Coca-Cola Company, themed around the FIFA World Cup in South Africa, were aired from May 17, 2010 to June 7, 2010. This was the first time since the second season that the episodes were aired weekly.

No.	Airdate	Title
1	May 17	Mundial Surreal
2	May 24	Loira à Rodo
3	May 31	A Escolha do Neguinho
4	June 7	O Gênio da Bola

=== Season 6 (2011) ===
This season, the design of the main characters as well as some other characters has changed (for example, Joey Ramone has a more "Ramonian" style) & characters that were once extras, such as Picadinho, took on a bigger role.

No.	Airdate	Title
01	June 2	Amor de Verão
02	June 9	A Namorada do Zezé
03	June 16	Conrado Maneiro
04	June 23	Ligeiramente Prenha
05	June 24	A Morte da Funérea
06	July 7	Wonderful World
07	July 14	E.T. o Contrabandista
08	July 21	Casalzinho Cudi Cudi
09	July 28	A Marcha do Caqui
10	August 4	O Barato Que Dá
11	August 11	Quem Tem Memória, Não Lembra
12	August 18	O Pequeno Morrissey
13	August 25	Quero Ser Cazé Peçanha
