= Live Earth concert, Rio de Janeiro =

Concert event

Live Earth
- Rio de Janeiro Concert location
Location	Copacabana Beach, Rio de Janeiro, Brazil
Founded by	Al Gore and Kevin Wall
Date	July 7, 2007
Genre(s)	Pop and Rock music
Website	Live Earth Brazil Site

The Live Earth concert for South America was held at Copacabana Beach, Rio de Janeiro, Brazil, on July 7, 2007. It is one of two free Live Earth concerts, the other being held in Washington, D.C. It was the last concert to start during the day-long event. However, that didn't make it the last to finish, for the New York concert was still going on when things wrapped up in Rio. Lenny Kravitz was the headliner, playing a free gig there for the second time.

A few days before the event, a State prosecutor tried to cancel it, due to an alleged lack of police personnel to take care of security. However, the day after that, the concert was reinstated. Attendance was of about 400,000 people, much less than the crowd drawn to Copacabana by the Rolling Stones free concert on February 18, 2006, which exceeded a million people. Audience numbers were closer to those of the other Lenny Kravitz performance there, on March 21, 2005. On that occasion, Kravitz performed in a concert of his own, staged at a different location on the beach. The Rolling Stones concert and Live Earth happened at exactly the same spot, in front of the Copacabana Palace hotel.

== Running order ==
The following artists performed at the Brazilian Live Earth concert (in order of appearance):

- DJ Dennis - "Mix" (CO 6:17)
- Xuxa - "Tesoura Sem Fim", "Mega Mix/Outro" (CO 20:00)
- Jota Quest - "Dias Melhores", Além Do Horizonte", "É Pra Lá que Eu Vou", "Até Onde Vai" (CO 20:45)
- Perlla - "Totalmente Demais" (CO 4:06)
- MV Bill - "Emivi", "Estilo Vagabundo" (with Perlla) (CO 21:20)
- Marcelo D2 and Alcione - "1967" (CO 3:56)
- Marcelo D2 - "À Procura da Batida Perfeita", "Rapping", "Qual É" (CO 22:05)
- Pharrell Williams - "Lapdance", "She Wants to Move", "Lapdance", "Brain" (CO 22:50)
- O Rappa - "Pescador de Ilusões", "Rodo Cotidiano (My Brother)", "Me Deixa" (CO 23:35)
- Macy Gray - "I Try", "Everybody", "Treat Me Like Your Money", "Spin Me Round", "Sexual Revolution", "Let's Get This Party Started / Oblivion", "Give Peace a Chance" (CO 00:20)
- Jorge Ben Jor - Jorge da Capadócia", "Medley: "Menina/Chove Chuva/País Tropical/Mas Que Nada", "Taj Mahal/Cidade Maravilhosa" (CO 01:05)
- Lenny Kravitz - "Are You Gonna Go My Way", "Let Love Rule", "Bring it on", "American Woman", "Calling All Angels", "Always on the Run", "Where Are We Runnin'?" (CO 01:50)
- Banda Zambe - "DJ mix" (CO 10:07)
- DJ Janet - "Samba Music / Spin" (CO 09:59)
