= Galo Frito =

Comedy career
- Years active: 2007–present
- Medium: Internet
- Genre: Sketch comedy

Galo Frito (formerly Programa Galo Frito) is an online comedy show broadcast on YouTube, having previously aired on the now-defunct FizTV channel that gained internet notoriety after winning a VMB award in 2010 for a parody of the song "Baby" by Canadian singer Justin Bieber; today, it is one of the most popular Brazilian channels, boasting approximately 10 million viewers and a monthly income of around R$ 70,000 from the show.

== History ==
=== past background ===
In 2006, Mederijohn Corumbá and Guilherme Anjeli decided to create an extension project for the University of Vale do Itajaí (the college where they were studying advertising) as a humor program unlike any other in Brazil, using sketches in the form of short films. André Petermann (Buda) was brought on board, and thus Galo Frito was born, named as a play on words with the rooster, a mascot in advertising and marketing. The project was intended to be broadcast on the university's TV channel, but it was rejected when first presented. When Mederi managed to buy a camera to record the first video, Guilherme Anjeli suffered a motorcycle accident and passed away, putting Galo Frito on hold for about six months.

Not wanting to let the project end, Tiago Cadore (Cadore) joined the group in 2007, followed shortly by Patrícia Dos Reis (Pathy) and Roberto Pereira (Beto). They performed sketches that were projected onto a white sheet during college breaks; classes from various majors would pause to watch and laugh at the skits. After the show was posted online, the cable channel FizTV recruited the group for a year-and-a-half run, featuring *Galo Frito* as a regular 15-minute weekly program. Beto stayed for only eight or nine episodes before leaving the group due to other job offers. After a period of financial hardship, the show was dropped from FizTV's lineup, and the group decided to move to YouTube.

=== 2007-2009 (Origin, "Dancing Lula" and "Justin Biba") ===
On October 3, 2007, the Galo Frito channel was created on YouTube. The group made videos, but none became famous. Then, one day Mederi had an idea to produce a video on his own, satirizing the then-Brazilian president Luiz Inácio Lula da Silva, making a video of him dancing to the song "Harder, Better, Faster, Stronger," which became a hit after a video by Daft Hand; several blogs started to share it virally, as well as Twitter, Orkut, etc. On the same day of the upload, he had already contacted some TV stations, including MTV. A month later, a similar video called "Dancing Obama" was made, which was also a success, but never reach the same notability to "Dancing Lula." The Galo Frito channel began to gain fame, and other videos started to get more views, but none yet surpassed the "dancing" videos.

That same year, member Buda left due to "differences of opinion." They eventually ventured into music by creating parodies, producing "Justin Biba" (a parody of Justin Bieber) which featured mainstream TV actor Helio de la Peña and, upon its release, became the most-watched comedy video on YouTube in Brazil (a record since surpassed by another Galo Frito parody, "Vou te Encoxar", parody of Gangnam Style) and winning the WebHit category at the VMB music awards.

=== 2010-2013 (Pathy que te Pariu) ===
In 2010, "Pathy que te Pariu" board is created, hosted by Patrícia dos Reis. The segment remained on the channel for a few years but later moved to a standalone channel of the same name. In 2015, Pathy dos Reis left the Galo Frito channel, acknowledging that her involvement had been merely a minor contribution to launch her own YouTube channel. She made a guest appearance in the 2016 video "1 BILHÃO" (a Galo Frito's video celebrating one billion views) and another during the premiere of the "Galo Frito Show" segment. In October 2018, the channel reached 10 million subscribers.
