= Planet Hemp =

Brazilian rap rock musical group

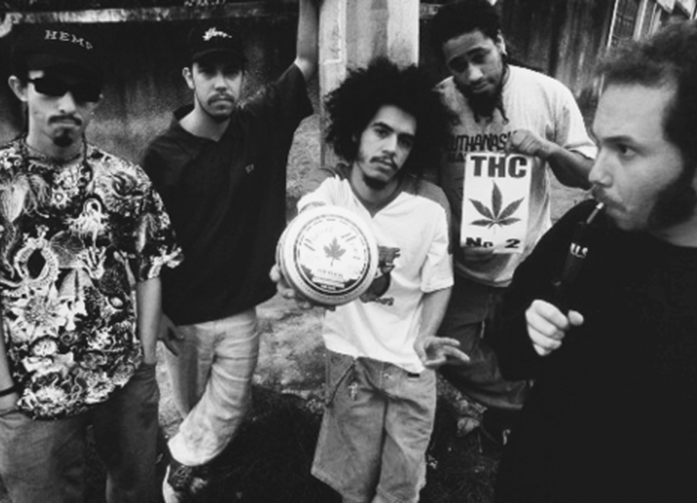

Background information
- Origin: Rio de Janeiro, Rio de Janeiro, Brazil
- Genres: Rap rock; samba rock; funk rock; ragga
- Years active: 1993–2001; 2012–2025 (reunions: 2003, 2010)
- Labels: Chaos; Som Livre
- Members: Marcelo D2; Formigão; B Negão; Pedro Garcia; Nobru
- Past members: Skunk; Bacalhau; Black Alien; Rafael Crespo

Planet Hemp was a Brazilian rap rock band, formed in Rio de Janeiro, Brazil, in 1993, known for starting the career of rappers Marcelo D2 and B Negão for its lyrics supporting the legality of cannabis. The band's original members was Marcelo D2 (vocals), Skunk (vocals), Rafael Crespo (guitars), Formigão (bass) and Bacalhau (drums). The band broke up in 2001 due to differences between the band members, and Marcelo D2 and B Negão are increasing focus on their solo projects. Since 2012 the band reunited and released the album Jardineiros. in June of 2025, the band announced their disbandment and farewell tour.

== Band members ==
=== Current members ===
- Marcelo D2 – vocals (1993–2001, 2012–present)
- Formigão – bass (1993–2001, 2012–present)
- B Negão – vocals (1994–1996, 1997–2001, 2012–present)
- Pedro Garcia – drums (1999–2001, 2012–present)
- Nobru – guitars (2015–present)

=== Touring members ===
- Daniel Ganjaman - keyboards, guitar, bass (2018 - Present)
- DJ Castro - turntables, samples (2018 - Present)

=== Former members ===
- Skunk – vocals (1993–1994, his death)
- Bacalhau – drums (1993–1998)
- Black Alien – vocals (1997–2001)
- Rafael Crespo – guitars (1993–2001, 2012–2013)

== Discography ==
=== Studio albums ===
- (1995) Usuário
- (1997) Os Cães Ladram Mas a Caravana Não Pára
- (2000) A Invasão do Sagaz Homem Fumaça
- (2022) Jardineiros

=== Live/video albums ===
- (2001) MTV ao Vivo: Planet Hemp
- (2024) Baseado em Fatos Reais: 30 Anos de Fumaça
