= Móveis Coloniais de Acaju =

Brazilian band

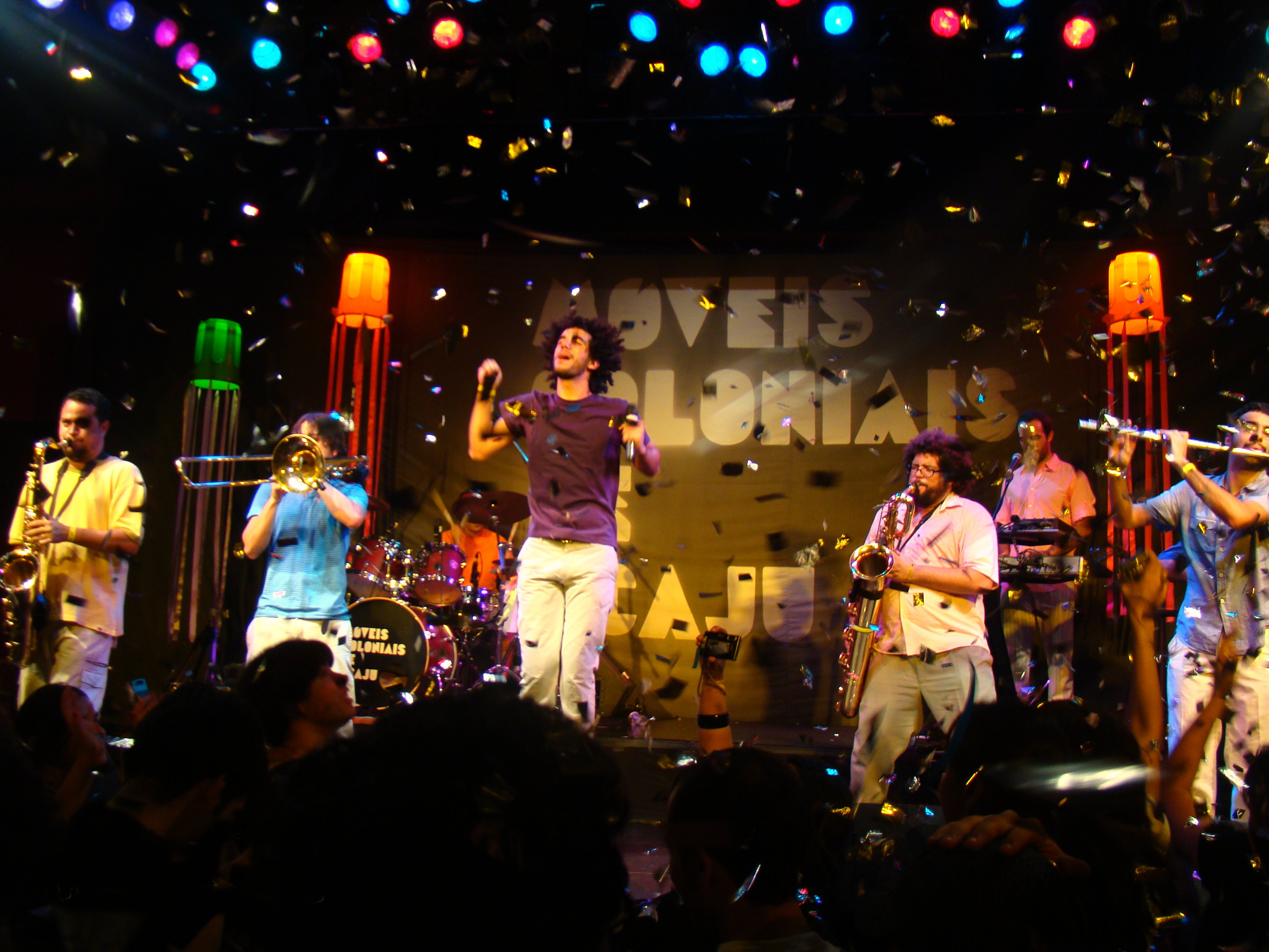

Background information
- Origin: Brasília, DF, Brazil
- Genres: Indie rock, ska
- Years active: 1998 - present
- Members: André Gonzáles; BC; Beto Mejía; Eduardo Borém; Esdras Nogueira; Fabio Pedroza; Paulo Rogério; Gabriel Coaracy; Xande Bursztyn; Fabrício Ofuji
- Website: moveiscoloniaisdeacaju.com.br

Móveis Coloniais de Acaju (usually referred to as simply Móveis; Portuguese pronunciation: [ˈmɔvejs]) are a Brazilian-based band comprising ten members, including singer André Gonzáles, keyboardist Eduardo Borém, and bassist Fabio Pedroza. The band's name literally translated means "colonial mahogany wood-made furniture".

== The Acaju Rebellion ==
According to Fabrício Ofuji, the name of the band is a homage to a fictitious rebellion that supposedly happened when English troops invaded Bananal Island, in the Northern Region of Brazil.

English troops invaded and settled down on the island, where they started making furniture out of Cedrela odorata, commonly known as “Acaju”. When the Portuguese discovered the invasion, they gathered slaves, indigenous people and other Portuguese to kick out the invaders.

The Portuguese forces were successful, and decided to burn the colonial furniture that belonged to the invaders as a celebration of their victory.

== Discography ==
=== Albums ===
- 2005 - Idem (sold by Amazon as "Moveis Coloniais de Acaju")
- 2009 - C_mpl_te
- 2013 - De Lá Até Aqui

=== Singles ===
- 2006 - Seria o Rolex?
- 2007 - Sem Palavras (free digital release)
- 2009 - O Tempo (free digital release)
- 2009 - Falso Retrato (U-HU) (free digital release)
- 2009 - Projeto Tamar: 30 anos (free digital release)

=== EPs ===
- 2001 - Móveis Coloniais de Acaju (EP)
- 2007 - Vai Thomaz no Acaju (with Gabriel Thomaz from Autoramas)

== See also ==
- Jota Quest
- Pato Fu
- Skank
- Los Hermanos
- Brazilian rock
