= FizTV =

Fiz TV
Ownership
- Owner: Editora Abril

History
- Launched: 2007
- Replaced by: MTV Brasil

FizTV is a cable television channel owned by Abril Radiodifusão, a subsidiary of Grupo Abril and launched on July 29, 2007. The channel was based on the website Fiz, where the public submitted videos and the best ones were showcased on the site for internet users to rate.

== History ==
=== Creation ===
The channel was part of Abril Radiodifusão, alongside MTV Brasil, and was available exclusively on channel 16 of TVA. Known by the nickname "Fiz," it aired programs such as *Fiz Notícias*, *Fiz Curta*, *Fiz Tura*, *Fiz Doc*, *Fiz Lugares*, and *Fiz Em Casa*, among others. The programs relied on work created by independent producers, who were initially paid R$ 50 for the best submissions.

The initial idea was to align the channel's programming structure with the language of the internet, where users submitted videos via the website and the best ones were broadcast on the channel.

=== Low audience and ending of Activies ===
Due to low viewership, a lack of profitability, and the fact that the channel failed to secure a spot in Sky and NET’s packages—at a time when those two operators held 73% of the Brazilian pay-TV market -, In June 2009, the Abril Group announced the discontinuation of the Fiz channel and Ideal TV, stating in a press release that the decision "was motivated by the difficulty of overcoming a practically insurmountable barrier that exists in Brazil regarding the distribution of pay-TV channels." Both channels went off the air on July 30.

Three months after the ending, the MTV Brasil channel made the program Fiz na MTV, showing vídeos and other indepent projects who are sending by the users from the website of the channel.
