= Dead Fish (band) =

Brazilian hardcore band

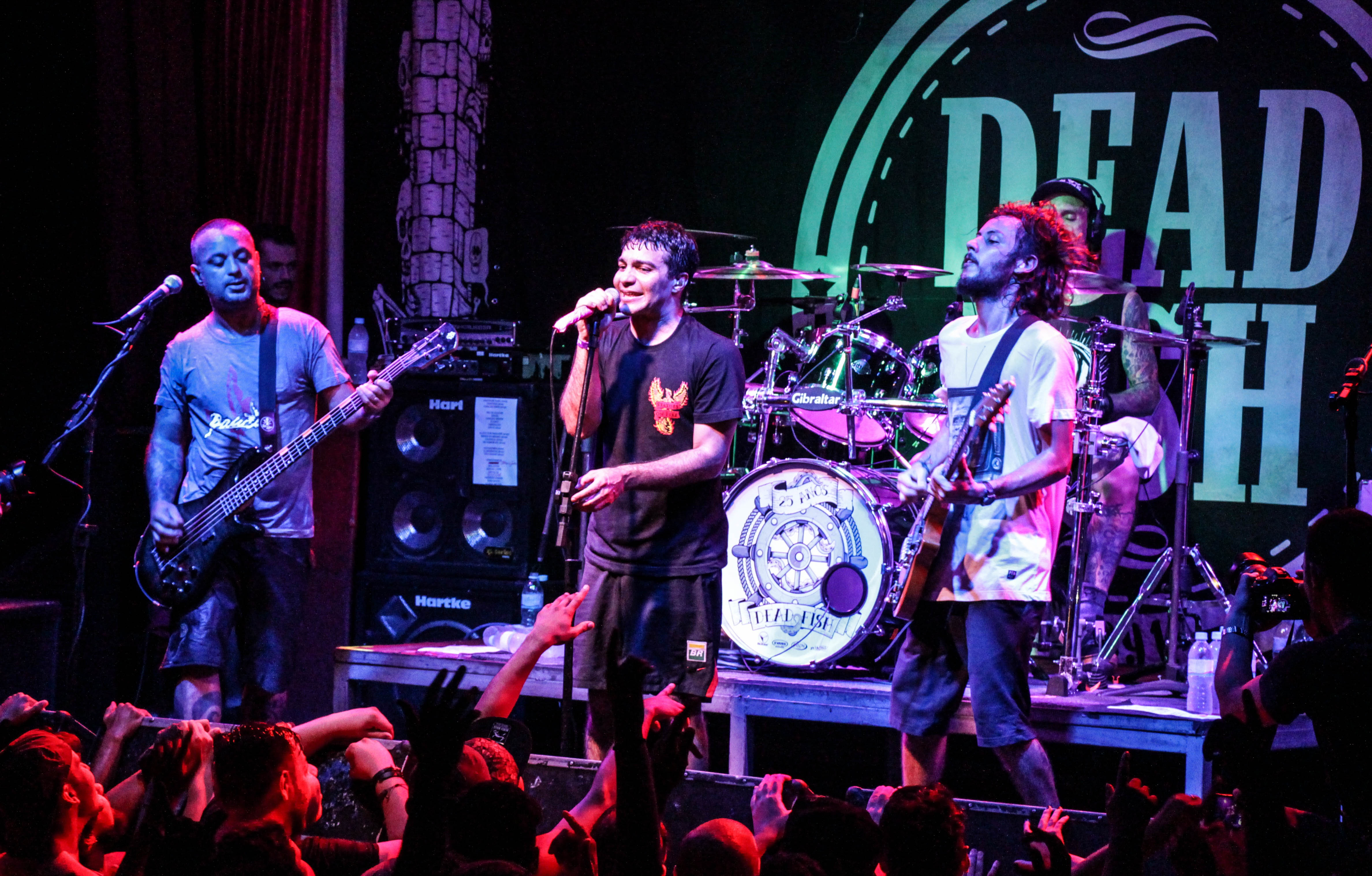
- Dead Fish 2017

Background information
- Origin: Vitória, Espírito Santo, Brazil
- Genres: Punk rock; hardcore punk; melodic hardcore
- Years active: 1991–present
- Label: Deckdisc
- Members: Rodrigo Lima; Marcos Melloni; Rick Mastria; Igor Tsurumaki
- Past members: Gustavo "Arroz" Buteri; Murilo Almeida; Tiago Hóspede; Giuliano de Landa; Leandro "Nô" Pretti; Philippe Fargnoli; Alyand Barbosa
- Website: deadfishoficial.com

Dead Fish is a Brazilian hardcore band that formed in Vitória, Espírito Santo, in 1991. After releasing four independent albums and numerous demos, they reached the mainstream market and garnered national attention with their breakthrough album Zero e Um (Zero and One), released by Deckdisc in 2004. For the title track from this album, they won an MTV Video Music Brazil award for Best New Artist. They went on to win Best Hardcore Video at the 2009 MTV Video Awards.

== History ==
In the early 1990s in Vitória, Espírito Santo, a group of friends with a shared interest in skateboarding decided to start playing music together. Inspired by Dead Kennedys, The Innocents and 7 Seconds, Marcelo “Suicidal” (vocals), Christian Changsut (lead guitar), Gustavo "Arroz" Buteri (rhythm guitar), Leonardo "Formiguinha" (bass) and Leandro “Nô” (drums) formed a band they called "Stage Dive". Shortly thereafter, Rodrigo Lima took over the vocal duties and that was the true beginning of the band. They did not have their own instruments, and did not know how to play, but learned as they went. They went from covering the Ramones, Bad Brains and Bad Religion to writing their own songs and performing their first concerts. They discovered there were already other bands called Stage Dive, so they wrote down a bunch of possible new names, and chose Dead Fresh Fish, which was then reduced to just Dead Fish.

In 1995, they released the demo tape Re-Progresso (Re-Progress), and three years later, they released their first album, Sirva-se (Serve Yourself) on the Capixaba label, Lona Records. The album sold more than 10,000 copies in the first year, a rare feat for an independent band, especially at that time. Next, they released Sonho Médio (Middle Dream) in 1999, an historic album for Brazilian hardcore. Despite an offer to continue with Lona Records, they decided they wanted to do their own production and distribution of their next album. They created a fictitious label, initially just to "have something to put on the cover", and that is how Terceiro Mundo Produções Fonográficas (Third World Phonographic Productions) was born, in 1999. It eventually became a genuine label and released albums by Sugar Kane and Noção de Nada, in addition to Dead Fish. They released Afasia (Aphasia) on their own label in 2001. During the completion of the album, which was going to be called Iceberg, internal conflicts arose. The album has a different sound from previous releases, representing this new phase the band was going through.

The opinions and attitude of Giuliano, who had been the guitarist to this point, began diverging greatly from what Nô and Rodrigo were willing to do. This atmosphere weighed heavily on their shows and appearances, and to avoid breaking up, they met with Alyand and Murilo and reached a consensus that Giuliano leaving the band would be the best alternative. In December 2002, they recorded a live album, simply called Ao Vivo no Hangar 110 (Live at Hangar 110), at Hangar 110 in São Paulo. In mid-2003, the other guitarist, Murilo, left the band, which threatened to bring the end of the band. At the end of the same year, they received an offer from major label Deckdisc. The band accepted, and called Philippe and Hóspede to take over the guitars and entered the studio to record their fourth studio album, Zero e Um (Zero and One) in 2004. The same year, the band gained national recognition, receiving the MTV Video Music Brazil award for Best New Artist. They went on to team with MTV to release their first DVD, MTV Apresenta Dead Fish (MTV Presents Dead Fish).

In 2006, they released another album on the same label called Um Homem Só (Just One Man), and they re-released their early demo tapes on the Laja Records label, under the title Demo-Tapes, which also included various videos, flyers, and show posters from their early years. The next year, the band played twenty shows in Germany and the Czech Republic. At the end of December 2007, the guitarist Hóspede left the band for unknown reasons. In 2009, the drummer, Nô, left the band for personal reasons and was replaced by Marcão (Ação Direta). Nô's last album with band was Contra Todos (Against Everybody). Many member had joined and left the band, but Nô's departure was the most significant, at least for Rodrigo. The two were longtime friends, and they had started the band together. The reason for his departure was never made public. The same year, Dead Fish won another award at the 2009 MTV Video Music Brazil Awards in the category of Best Hardcore Video.

In 2011 the band celebrated their twenty-year anniversary. A new album is in production and some of the new songs are already being played in concert. The next album will be the first for the current lineup. In 2020, as part of their thirty-year anniversary, they released IPA, Weiss and Gold Ale beers, produced in limited edition.

== Band members ==
=== Current members ===
- Rodrigo Lima - vocals (1991–present)
- Marcos Melloni - drums (2009–present)
- Rick Mastria - guitar (2013–present)
- Igor Tsurumaki - bass (2019–present)

=== Former members ===
- Gustavo "Arroz" Buteri - guitar (1991–1997)
- Murilo Almeida - guitar (1997–2003)
- Tiago Hóspede - guitar (2003–2007)
- Giuliano de Landa - guitar (1997–2001)
- Leandro "Nô" Pretti - drums (1991–2008)
- Philippe Fargnoli - guitar (2003–2013)
- Alyand Barbosa - bass (1996–2018)

== Discography ==
=== Studio albums ===
- (1998) Sirva-se
- (1999) Sonho Médio
- (2001) Afasia
- (2004) Zero e Um
- (2006) Um Homem Só
- (2009) Contra Todos
- (2015) Victória
- (2019) Ponto Cego
- (2020) Lado Bets
- (2024) Labirinto da Memória

=== EPs ===
- (2002) EP 2002

=== Live/video albums ===
- (2002) Ao Vivo no Hangar 110
- (2004) MTV Apresenta: Dead Fish
- (2012) 20 Anos - Ao Vivo no Circo Voador
- (2017) XXV - Ao vivo em SP

=== Split albums ===
- Faces do Terceiro Mundo (split) (2002)
- Dead Fish / Mukeka di Rato (2010) (Compact 7" on vinyl)
- Dead Fish/Zander (Split) (2013) (Compact 7" on vinyl)

=== Compilation albums ===
- Metrofire (Under the name "Projeto Peixe Morto" (The Dead Fish Project), the band does not consider this a part of their official discography.) (2001)
- Demo-Tapes (2006)

=== Music videos ===
- Sonho Médio (1999)
- Proprietários do 3º Mundo (2001)
- Noite (2001)
- Tango (2002)
- Zero e Um (2004)
- Você (2004)
- Bem-Vindo ao Clube (2005)
- Obrigação (2006)
- Autonomia (2009)
- Vitória (2015)
- Selfegofactóide (2015)
- Sausalito (2017)
- Cara Violência (2017)
