= Kassin =

Kassin is a surname. Notable people with the surname include:

- Elmo Kassin (born 1969), Estonian cross-country skier
- Sam Kassin (born 1944), American educator
- Saul Kassin (born 1953), American psychologist

== See also ==
- Bkassine, village in Lebanon
