= Pitanga (album) =

Mallu Magalhães

Studio album by Mallu Magalhães
- Released: September 30, 2011
- Genre: Indie folk, MPB, pop
- Label: Sony Music
- Producer: Mallu Magalhães, Marcelo Camelo, Victor Rice, Fernandro Sanches

Mallu Magalhães chronology
Mallu Magalhães (2009)	Mallu Magalhães (2011)

Pitanga is the third studio album by Brazilian singer-songwriter Mallu Magalhães, released September 30, 2011.

== Track listing ==
1. "Velha e Louca"
2. "Cena"
3. "Sambinha Bom"
4. "Olha Só, Moreno"
5. "Youhuhu"
6. "Por Que Você Faz Assim Comigo?"
7. "Baby, I'm Sure"
8. "In The Morning"
9. "Lonely"
10. "Highly Sensitive"
11. "Ô, Ana"
12. "Cais"

== Chart positions ==
Chart (2014)	Peak position
Portuguese Albums (AFP)	24

== Sources ==
- The information in this article is based on that in its Portuguese equivalent.
