= J1 (song) =

Single by Mallu Magalhães

from the album Mallu Magalhães
- Released: April 11, 2008
- Recorded: 2008; AR Studios (Rio de Janeiro, Rio de Janeiro)
- Genre: Folk
- Length: 3:40
- Label: Agência de Música
- Songwriter(s): Mallu Magalhães
- Producer(s): Mario Caldato Jr

Mallu Magalhães singles chronology
"J1" (2008)	"Tchubaruba" (2008)

J1 is a song by Brazilian folk singer Mallu Magalhães. Written by Mallu, the track was produced by Mario Caldato Jr for his debut album self-titled Mallu Magalhães.

"J1" was launched on April 11, 2008 as the first single from the Mallu Magalhães. The single was not released to radio but is considered the second most successful Mallu song, after Tchubaruba. In addition, the magazine Rolling Stone includes "J1" in its list of the 25 best Brazilian songs of 2008.

== Background ==
"J1" was recorded by Mallu before being released as a single and enter the album through the website MySpace. Was heard by millions of people on the Internet and the second most successful Mallu today.

== Critical reception ==
Mallu was critically acclaimed and entered the list of Rolling Stone magazine as one of the 25 best songs of 2008 in Brazil.

== Music video ==
In all of the music video "J1", Mallu is a room where he plays guitar and dubs the music. It uses an eye, write, glue pictures, meche boots. Who directed the video was Macau Amaral.
