= Mallu Magalhães =

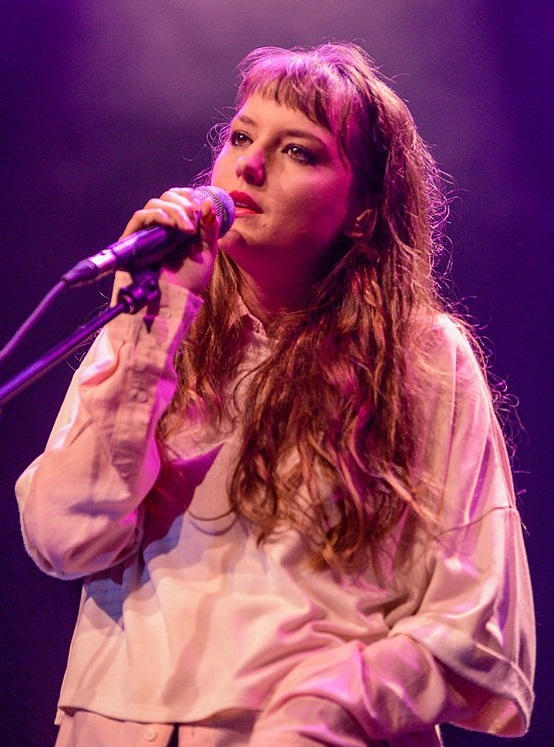

Background information
- Also known as: Mallu Magalhães
- Born: Maria Luiza de Arruda Botelho Pereira de Magalhães; São Paulo, Brazil
- Genres: MPB, indie pop, indie folk, folk rock, bossa nova
- Occupations: Singer-songwriter, musician, composer
- Instruments: Vocals, guitar, harmonica, banjo, dobro, ukulele
- Years active: 2007–present
- Label: Sony BMG
- Website: www.mallumusic.com.br

Maria Luiza de Arruda Botelho Pereira de Magalhães, known as Mallu Magalhães (pronounced [maˈlu maɡaˈʎɐ̃js]), is a Brazilian singer, songwriter and musician. Mallu first came to prominence through her MySpace page, becoming known for her own songs and those of other artists. She found herself gracing the covers of major newspapers such as Folha de S. Paulo, O Estado de S. Paulo and Jornal do Brasil, and was featured in Rolling Stone, Istoé, Época among others. In the first two years of career, she became the subject of countless blogs, packed shows, attracted critical attention, and had more than 4 million hits on her MySpace page. In 2008 she released her first eponymous album and in 2009 she released her second album, also self-titled. In 2013 she formed Banda do Mar, along with her husband Marcelo Camelo, and the Portuguese drummer Fred Ferreira. Their first album was released in August 2014. Mallu has a daughter, Luísa, born December 28, 2015.

== Biography ==
=== 1992–2007: Before the fame ===
Mallu is the daughter of a landscape architect and an engineer with a passion for classic rock, which appears as an influence on their musical tastes. Aged eight, Mallu received a guitar from her father and two years later began teaching. At twelve, she began writing songs, mostly written in English.

On her 15th birthday, Mallu asked her parents and grandparents that their gifts were given in cash. With it, Mallu managed to record four songs in the studio Lucy Sky, and put them on her MySpace page, among which "Tchubaruba", "J1" and the music video "Vanguart" became best known.

Mallu has received positive criticism in publications such as Rolling Stone, Trip and Bravo!, and her music has been praised for its inception, spontaneity, cultural background and her talent for singing and composing both in English and Portuguese. Mallu also sings and composes in French. She lists her influences as classic rock and folk as well as The Beatles, Belle & Sebastian, Bob Dylan, Johnny Cash, and other similar musical styles.

Mallu Magalhães was the first artist from Brazil to participate in the design world Sessions MTV and at the same station, had her first clip "J1", as one of the most requested by viewers.

Mallu plays guitar, harmonica, melodica and banjo.

=== 2008–2009: First album, tour, and DVD ===
With concerts selling out across the country, she held a special show for the clothing line Maria Bonita Extra, at Fashion Rio, a major fashion event in Brazil; three concerts in Portugal, one of which at the biggest music festival in the country, Southwest Festival, along with Faith No More and Lily Allen. The songs "J1" and "Tchubaruba" were also used in a national campaign for Brazilian cell phone operator Vivo.

Mallu collected appraisals from celebrities and national personalities all over Brazil. She was a special guest at Tom Zé's talk show. Being one of her greatest fans, he declared once:

"I heard the music of Mallu and loved it. I became a fan."

During the holidays in July 2008, Mallu recorded at AR studios in Rio de Janeiro, where a console analog to the one at British EMI's Abbey Road Studios, analogue tape recorders and rare microphones from the 60s were used, to capture the atmosphere. The production was led by Mario Caldato Jr, who had worked with artists like John Lee Hooker, Beck and Björk, and the album was released independently by the Agencia de Música and Microservice on November 15, 2008.

Invited by the artist Marcelo Camelo (Los Hermanos), Mallu sang and played the guitar in the song Janta (Marcelo Camelo), which appeared on Camelo's debut album. Both admitted having a relationship after Camelo made a special appearance at Mallu's concert on Morro da Urca in October 2008.

That same year Mallu was nominated for the Brazilian's MTV Music Awards, running for artist of the year, best new artist and concert of the year, but lost. She spent the year traveling around Brazil and giving numerous concerts, including one at the My Space Music Tour, a gratuitous series of concerts. In early October, she recorded her first live DVD during a concert in São Paulo.

=== 2009–2010: Second album and tour ===
In August 2009, Mallu entered the studio again, this time under the direction of producer Kassin (Vanessa da Mata, Caetano Veloso, Mariah Carey) to record her second CD, which was launched on December 8, 2009, Agência de Música/Sony Music with Shine Yellow as the first single. A tour supported the album pair began on January 23, 2010, in the "Festival de Verão de Salvador" in Salvador, Bahia.

=== 2011–2013: Third album and international exposure ===
In "Pitanga", produced in partnership with her boyfriend Marcelo Camelo and released on September 30, 2011, Mallu presents her third album showing both personal and musical growth. In this album, the artist explored new instruments such as drums, piano and electric guitars. "Highly Sensitive", a compilation, was released in October 2013 in the US, Mallu's first US release. Prior to the release of the album, the title track "Highly Sensitive" was used as the soundtrack for Windows 8 commercial ads.

=== 2013–present: Banda do Mar and Vem ===
After moving to Lisbon with her husband Marcelo Camelo, they joined the drummer Fred Ferreira to form Banda do Mar, releasing their first album in late 2014. In 2017, she released her fourth solo album Vem, which was elected the 4th best Brazilian album of 2017 by the Brazilian edition of Rolling Stone.

== Discography ==
=== Solo ===
Studio albums

- Mallu Magalhães (2008)
- Mallu Magalhães (2009)
- Pitanga (2011)
- Vem (2017)
- Esperança (2021)

Compilation albums

- Highly Sensitive (2013)

Video releases

- Mallu Magalhães (2008)

=== With Banda do Mar ===
- Banda do Mar (2014)

== Awards and nominations ==
Year	Awards	Category	Recipient	Outcome	Ref.
2008	Best of the Year	Best Musical Revelation	Mallu Magalhães	Nominated	
2008	MTV Video Music Brazil	Best New Act	Mallu Magalhães	Nominated	
2008	MTV Video Music Brazil	Act of the Year	Mallu Magalhães	Nominated	
2008	MTV Video Music Brazil	Best Live Act	Mallu Magalhães	Nominated	
2009	MTV Video Music Brazil	Act of the Year	Mallu Magalhães	Nominated	
2009	MTV Video Music Brazil	Video of the Year	Vanguart	Nominated	
2010	MTV Video Music Brazil	Act of the Year	Mallu Magalhães	Nominated	
2010	MTV Video Music Brazil	Video of the Year	Shine Yellow	Nominated	
2010	MTV Video Music Brazil	Best Pop Act	Mallu Magalhães	Nominated	
2011	MTV Video Music Brazil	Video of the Year	Nem Fé, Nem Santo	Nominated	
2012	MTV Video Music Brazil	Act of the Year	Mallu Magalhães	Nominated	
2012	MTV Video Music Brazil	Video of The Year	Velha e Louca	Nominated	
2012	MTV Video Music Brazil	Best Female Act	Mallu Magalhães	Nominated	
2014	APCA Trophy	Best Group	Banda do Mar	Won	
2015	Latin Grammy Awards	Best Brazilian Rock Album	Banda do Mar	Nominated	
2015	Latin Grammy Awards	Best Brazilian Song	Mais Ninguém	Nominated	
