= Mallu Magalhães (2009 album) =

Studio album by Mallu Magalhães
- Released: December 8, 2009
- Recorded: 2009
- Genres: Folk rock, indie folk, alternative rock
- Labels: Agência de Música, Sony Music
- Producer: Kassin

Mallu Magalhães chronology
Mallu Magalhães (2008)	Mallu Magalhães (2009)	Pitanga (2011)

Singles from Mallu Magalhães
- 1. "Shine Yellow" Released: December 22, 2009

Mallu Magalhães is the second studio album by Brazilian folk singer Mallu Magalhães, released on December 8, 2009, through the Agência de Música and Sony Music.

The album was released only with the standard version. After its release, the album received favorable reviews from Brazilian Media. The album provided one single, "Shine Yellow".

== Background and concept ==
In August 2009, Magalhães entered the studio, this time under the direction of the record producer Kassin to record her second album.

Among the guests are Mauricio Takara, the band Jennifer Lo-Fi, and Marcelo Camelo, the singer's boyfriend and also a musician.

== Cover ==
The cover of the album consisted of pictures of Mallu and the cutouts and collages that she did herself.

== Music ==
This album, Magalhães exudes resourcefulness and creativity in vocal tracks that explore the different styles, from blues ("Nem Fé Nem Santo") to reggae ("Shine Yellow"). On the first track of her second album, Magalhães sang in English on the song "My Home Is My Man".

Even though Marcelo Camelo did not participate in "Nem Fé Nem Santo", you can hear a Mallu Magalhães strongly inspired by the manner of singing her boyfriend. In the first verses of this music, one can see that the contemporary Brazilian independente scene remains the basis for the sound of the girl, who, besides the noticeable differences, did not abandon the folk. The first single "Shine Yellow" is a sunny reggae song, with a horn arrangement reminiscent of Los Hermanos. Going along with the "samba indie" style, "Versinho de Número Um" has at least cute lyrics. There is no denying that along with several songs on the disc, "Versinho de Número Um" is purely influenced by Los Hermanos.

The singer, who still lives with her parents in São Paulo, wrote the song "Make It Easy" for her mother. Marcelo Camelo also makes an appearance in the folk-styled song. Tropicalistas echoes are also very clear in "Compromisso" with its marching band beat and the added guitar of Kadu Abecassis a la Lanny Gordin and participation of Marcelo Camelo. The importance of the optimal production of Kassin can also be noticed on the funky song "Te Acho Tão Bonito". The album also features the country songs "Ricardo" and "You Ain't Gonna Lose You".

More experimental is "Bee On The Grass" - makes the listener wonder if Mallu has been listening to the Brazilian singer Tom Zé. And finally we can see the last appearance of Camelo on the album. "Bee on the grass", which is pure psychedelia - Mallu says that due to new discoveries.

The last track on the album is "O Herói, O Marginal".

== Release and promotion ==
Magalhães released one single, "Shine Yellow", and began a tour in Brazil on January 23, 2010, in the "Festival de Verão de Salvador". The concert album release will be on March 19, 2010, in the Auditório Ibiapuera in São Paulo.

=== Singles ===
- "Shine Yellow" was released to radio and has a music video for the song.

=== Tour ===
Magalhães began to support his album on 22 January 2010 in "Festival de Verão de Salvador" in Salvador, Bahia.

== Reception ==
Professional ratings
Review scores
Source	Rating
Gereção Internet	3.5/5 stars

== Track listing ==
No.	Title	Writer(s)	Producer(s)	Length
1.	"My Home Is My Man"	Mallu Magalhães	Kassin	3:47
2.	"Nem Fé Nem Santo"	Mallu Magalhães	Kassin	2:46
3.	"Shine Yellow"	Mallu Magalhães	Kassin	3:58
4.	"Versinho de Número Um"	Mallu Magalhães	Kassin	2:34
5.	"Make It Easy"	Mallu Magalhães	Kassin	4:24
6.	"Compromisso"	Mallu Magalhães	Kassin	2:46
7.	"Te Acho Tão Bonito"	Mallu Magalhães	Kassin	2:09
8.	"Ricardo"	Mallu Magalhães	Kassin	1:50
9.	"Bee on the Grass"	Mallu Magalhães	Kassin	3:16
10.	"Soul Mate"	Mallu Magalhães	Kassin	3:03
11.	"You Ain't Gonna Loose Me"	Mallu Magalhães	Kassin	3:00
12.	"É Você Que Tem"	Mallu Magalhães	Kassin	3:17
13.	"O Herói, O Marginal"	Mallu Magalhães	Kassin, Jennifer Lo-Fi	3:37
