= Mallu Magalhães (2008 album) =

Studio album by Mallu Magalhães
- Released: November 15, 2008
- Recorded: 2008; AR Studios (Rio de Janeiro, Rio de Janeiro)
- Genres: Indie folk, folk rock, alternative rock
- Labels: Agência de Música, Microservice
- Producer: Mario Caldato Jr

Mallu Magalhães chronology
Mallu Magalhães (2008)	Mallu Magalhães (2009)

Singles from Mallu Magalhães
- 1. "J1" Released: April 11, 2008; 2. "Tchubaruba" Released: August 5, 2008; 3. "O Preço da Flor" Released: July 6, 2009; 4. "Vanguart" Released: July 24, 2009

Mallu Magalhães is the debut studio album by the Brazilian folk singer Mallu Magalhães, released on November 15, 2008, through the Agência de Musica.

The album was also released only with the standard version. After his release, the album received favorable reviews in most of the songs. It produced four singles.

== Background and concept ==
In July 2008, Mallu entered a studio booked in Brazil to start recording the songs for the album. In the recording used analog equipment and even a mixer of the legendary studio Abbey Road to have a sound more similar to artists such as Beatles and Bob Dylan. Mario Caldato Jr, who worked with Beck, Beastie Boys and Marcelo D2, was responsible for production.

For the recording disc, she had the band from her early gigs: Kadu Abecassis (guitar) and Jorge Moreira (drums), whose produced the MySpace demos, and Thiago Consorti (bass) and Rodrigo de Alencar (piano).

== Cover ==
The cover image of a simple lion that resembles the image on top of some brands of Brazilian cookies refers subtly to Caetano Veloso, who Magalhães heard as a child, and the symbols of folk and American country music, which are influences of Mallu's musical style.

== Release and promotion ==
Two singles were released before the album's release date: "J1" and "Tchubaruba". She also did a show to promote the launch of the album on November 24, 2008 at Morro da Urca in Rio de Janeiro.

=== Singles ===
- "J1": Not released to radio stations but a music video was made for the song. It is the second most successful Mallu's song.
- "Tchubaruba": Released to radio stations.
- "O Preço da Flor": Not released to radio stations but a music video was made.
- "Vanguart": Not released to radio stations but a music video was made.

=== Tour ===
Mallu began to support her album on August 30, 2008 in "Festival Eletronika" in São Paulo and ended on June 27, 2009 in "Cooperativa Brasil" in Campinas, São Paulo.

== Reception ==
Professional ratings
Review scores
Source	Rating
G1	(7/10)
The Boston Phoenix	3/4 stars

G1 gave the album a 7 out of 10 and wrote: "If there was any doubt about the life of this girl out of the virtual world, just push the play. Mallu Magalhães is true."

The Boston Phoenix gave the album 3 out of 4 stars and wrote that "Mallu class can give to contemporary pop that we hear today."

Rolling Stone magazine considered it the second best Brazilian album of 2008. Also, the same magazine includes two tracks of the album on their "25 Best National Songs of 2008" list (J1 and Tchubaruba).

== Track listing ==
No.	Title	Writer(s)	Producer(s)	Length
1.	"You Know You've Got"	Mallu Magalhães	Mario Caldato Jr.	3:41
2.	"Don't You Look Back"	Mallu Magalhães	Mario Caldato Jr.	2:08
3.	"Tchubaruba"	Mallu Magalhães	Mario Caldato Jr	5:47
4.	"O Preço da Flor"	Mallu Magalhães	Mario Caldato Jr.	4:01
5.	"Town of Rock'n'Roll"	Mallu Magalhães	Mario Caldato Jr	4:57
6.	"Her Day Will Come"	Mallu Magalhães	Mario Caldato Jr	3:16
7.	"Angelina, Angelina"	Mallu Magalhães	Mario Caldato Jr.	2:24
8.	"J1"	Mallu Magalhães	Mario Caldato Jr	3:40
9.	"Get to Denmark"	Mallu Magalhães	Mario Caldato Jr	3:25
10.	"Vanguart"	Mallu Magalhães	Mario Caldato Jr	2:28
11.	"Dry Freezing Tongue"	Mallu Magalhães	Mario Caldato Jr.	4:03
12.	"Sualk"	Mallu Magalhães	Mario Caldato Jr.	3:45
13.	"Noil"	Mallu Magalhães	Mario Caldato Jr.	5:40
14.	"It Takes Two To Tango"	Mallu Magalhães	Mario Caldato Jr.	5:42
15.	"I Do Believe"	Mallu Magalhães	Mario Caldato Jr.	3:24
16.	"Have You Ever"	Mallu Magalhães	Mario Caldato Jr.	3:01
