= Marcelo D2 =

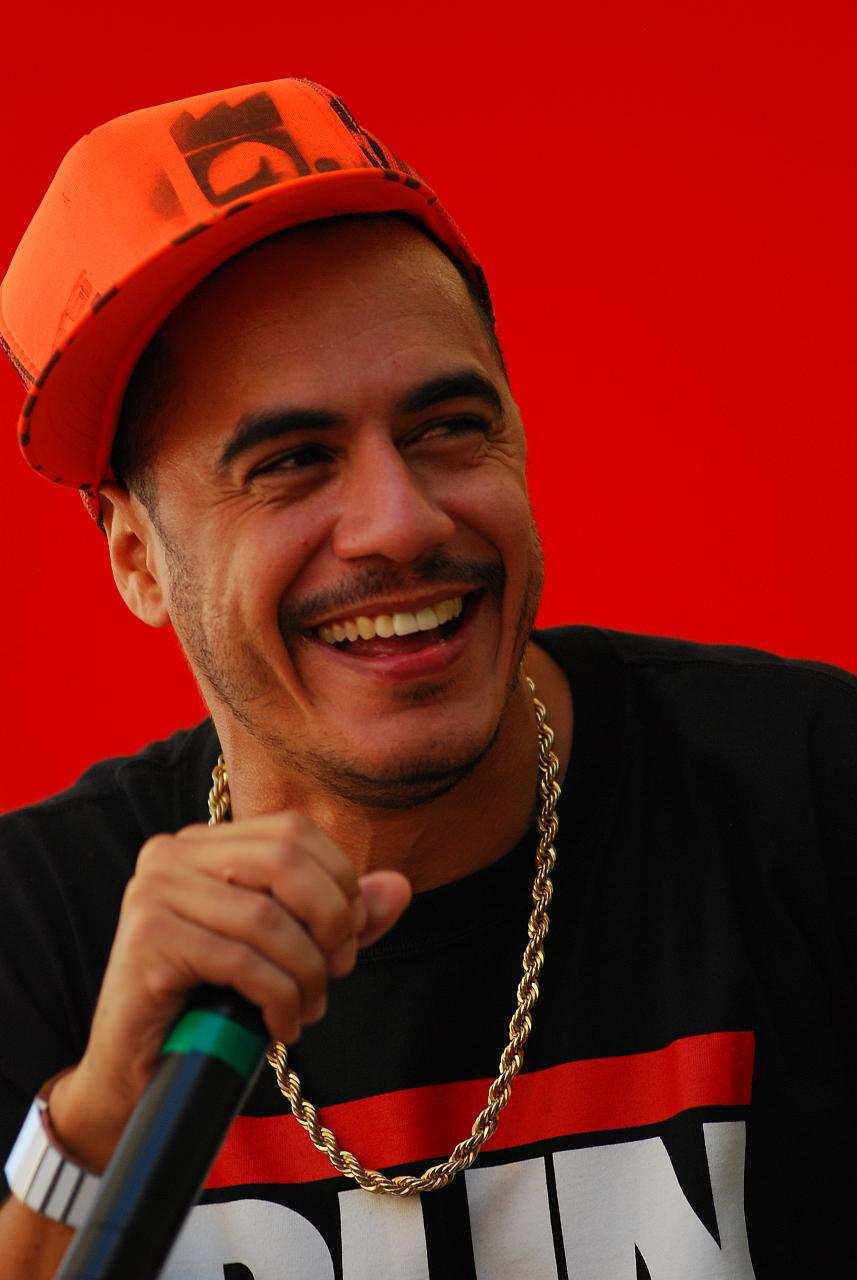

Background information
- Born: Marcelo Maldonado Peixoto; November 5, 1967 (age 58); Rio de Janeiro, Brazil
- Genres: Hip hop; rock; samba; reggae
- Occupations: Rapper, singer, songwriter
- Years active: 1998–present
- Labels: Chaos; Sony Music; EMI; Pupila Dilatada
- Formerly of: Planet Hemp
- Website: marcelod2.com.br

Marcelo Maldonado Peixoto (born November 5, 1967), also known as Marcelo D2, is a Brazilian rapper, singer and songwriter, co-founder of Planet Hemp.

== Biography ==
A former vocalist of the band Planet Hemp, he started his solo career in 1998 with the album Eu Tiro É Onda. The album was recorded in his studio by David Corcos, and was mixed in New York City and Los Angeles by Carlos Bass and Mario Caldato Eu Tiro É Onda was well accepted by the public and rap movement within São Paulo, earning respect from names such as Black Alien, Zé Gonzalez and BNegão.

Marcelo returned to Rio de Janeiro with a pregnant girlfriend who gave birth to his son Luca. He found renewed success after restarting his solo career with the participation of the Hemp Family, a group formed by the pioneers of rap in Rio de Janeiro.

In 2003 he released À Procura da Batida Perfeita (Portuguese for "Looking for the perfect beat", a reference to an Afrika Bambaataa song of the same name) produced by Beastie Boys producer Mario Caldato. The album mixed hip-hop with samba, and included a collaboration with will.i.am from The Black Eyed Peas. The album was a hit, and led to an Acústico MTV performance, analogous to MTV Unplugged in the United States. The album was released with the English title in Asia, Europe, and North America. Finally, the album was promoted with a two-year tour.

Marcelo D2 appeared as a guest performer on two tracks of Sérgio Mendes' album Timeless.

His third album Meu Samba É Assim ("My Samba Is Like This") was released May 8, 2006. It features Chali 2na of Jurassic 5 on the track "That's What I Got".

In 2010, Marcelo D2's video "Meu Tambor" was nominated for Video of the Year for MTV Brasil.

His album Amor É Para os Fortes was elected as one of the 25 best Brazilian albums of the second half of 2018 by the São Paulo Association of Art Critics.

In 2021, his album Assim Tocam Meus Tambores was nominated for the Latin Grammy Award for Best Portuguese Language Rock or Alternative Album. His album Iboru was chosen by the Associação Paulista de Críticos de Arte as one of the 50 best Brazilian albums of 2023.

== Discography ==
=== Planet Hemp ===
==== Studio albums ====
- (1995) Usuário
- (1997) Os Cães Ladram Mas a Caravana Não Pára
- (2000) A Invasão do Sagaz Homem Fumaça
- (2022) Jardineiros

==== Live/video albums ====
- (2001) MTV ao Vivo: Planet Hemp
- (2024) Baseado em Fatos Reais: 30 Anos de Fumaça

=== Solo ===
==== Studio albums ====
- (1998) Eu Tiro é Onda
- (2003) À Procura da Batida Perfeita
- (2006) Meu Samba é Assim
- (2008) A Arte do Barulho
- (2010) Marcelo D2 canta Bezerra da Silva
- (2013) Nada Pode Me Parar
- (2018) Amar é para os Fortes
- (2020) Assim Tocam os Meus Tambores
- (2023) Iboru

==== Live/video albums ====
- (2004) Acústico MTV: Marcelo D2
- (2015) Nada Pode Me Parar ao Vivo!

==== Singles ====
List of singles as lead artist, with selected chart positions, showing year released and album name
Year	Title	Peak chart positions	Album
Year	Title	BRA	Album
1998	"1967"	61	Eu Tiro é Onda
1999	"Mantenha o Respeito"	77	Eu Tiro é Onda
2000	"Vai Vendo"	11	Eu Tiro é Onda
2003	"A Procura da Batida Perfeita"	1	A Procura da Batida Perfeita
2003	"Qual é?"	1	A Procura da Batida Perfeita
2004	"Loadeando" (feat. Stephan)	16	A Procura da Batida Perfeita
2004	"A Maldição do Samba"	51	A Procura da Batida Perfeita
2005	"CB (Sangue Bom)" (feat. Will.i.am)	7	Acústico MTV: Marcelo D2
2005	"Contexto" (feat. BNegão)	42	Acústico MTV: Marcelo D2
2006	"Gueto" (feat. Mr. Catra)	64	Meu Samba é Assim
2007	"Dor de Verdade" (feat. Zeca Pagodinho e Arlindo Cruz)	—	Meu Samba é Assim
2007	"That's What I Got" (feat. Chali Tuna)	8	Meu Samba é Assim
2008	"Desabafo"	6	A Arte do Barulho
2009	"Ela Disse" (feat. Thalma de Freitas)	18	A Arte do Barulho
2009	"Pode Acreditar (Meu Laiá Laiá)"	62	A Arte do Barulho
2011	"Todos" (feat. Macaco)	53	Malhação Conectados
2013	"Está Chegando a Hora (Abre Alas)"	35	Nada Pode Me Parar

- Direct-to-Disc (2024)

== Trivia ==
- In 2011, he was the only artist who played at both Rock in Rio and SWU Music & Arts.
- Some of his songs were used in the Turistas soundtrack.
- His biggest radio hit is the song "Qual É?", which has featured on the popular TV show Cidade dos Homens.
- The "Loadeando" music video features his son, Stephen, several times.
- On July 7, 2007, he performed at the Brazilian leg of Live Earth in Rio de Janeiro.
- The song Desabafo is used as Brazilian UFC fighter, Paulo Thiago's entrance song. It is also featured in Fast Five.
- The song 'Profissão MC' appears on the soundtrack to the game FIFA Football 2005.
- The song 'Você Diz Que o Amor Não Dói' appears on the soundtrack to the game FIFA 14.
- He is a fan of Rio-based football club Flamengo.
