= 2011 MTV Video Music Brazil =

- Date: October 20, 2011
- Location: Quanta Studios
- Hosted by: Marcelo Adnet
- Website: http://vmb.mtv.uol.com.br/

Television/radio coverage
- Network: MTV Brasil

The 2011 MTV Video Music Brazil, known as VMB 2011 in Brazil, was held on October 20, 2011, hosted by Marcelo Adnet and took place at the Quanta Studios, São Paulo. It awarded the best in Brazilian music, popular culture and internet culture in the year of 2011.

For this edition, the concept has undergone a major makeover; after the happy rock band Restart winning all the 5 categories in which it was indicated in the previous edition by its large number of fans voting exaggeratedly (including Act of the Year), and not by its merit; and also the renewal of the station's programming in 2011, which favored even more the music. Under the awards theme "A música não para" (The music never stops), this VMB went to have a 100-member expert jury - the VMB Academy - to choose seven of the 11 awards; three new categories: Best Album, Best Album Art and Best Music; and the indication of many independent artists, like Emicida, Marcelo Jeneci and Criolo, valuing the musical production. However, the VMB didn't neglected the pop artists and web hits, keeping categories as Hit of the Year, Web Hit of the Year and Best International Act, and adding a new category: Best Web Video (Video musics made for internet).

For the first time, the VMB was held in a television studio (Quanta Studios), unlike the other editions, which were held in auditoriums such as Credicard Hall and Parque de Convenções do Anhembi. MTV Brasil considers that its structure was the largest in the history of the awards. And it was still divided into three stages: one for the main show, other for the VMBB (The B-side of VMB) and other for the VIP party - which this time took place simultaneously with the main show, and not after it. The first two stages had different live broadcasts - the main show on TV and Internet, and VMBB exclusively on the Internet. Some presentations of the awards - which had several of the meeting of 30 invited artists - had characterized the artists playing simultaneously and synchronously at the three stages of the event.

== Nominations ==
The nominees were revealed on August 26, 2011. Criolo and Marcelo Jeneci have received the most nominations, tied at five. Criolo won 3 awards.

=== VMB Academy ===
==== Act of the Year ====
- Emicida
- Criolo
- Marcelo Camelo
- Marcelo Jeneci
- NX Zero

==== Video of the Year ====
- Emicida - "Então Toma!"
- Criolo - "Subirusdoistiozin"
- Garotas Suecas - "Banho de Bucha"
- Jota Quest - "É Preciso (A Próxima Parada)"
- Lurdez da Luz - "Andei"
- Mallu Magalhães - "Nem Fé, Nem Santo"
- Mombojó - "Antimonotonia"
- Móveis Coloniais de Acaju - "O Tempo"
- Pitty - "Só Agora"
- Thiago Pethit - "Nightwalker"

==== Best Song ====
- Criolo – "Não Existe Amor em SP"
- Marcelo Camelo – "Ôô"
- Marcelo Jeneci – "Feito pra Acabar"
- Marina Lima feat. Samuel Rosa – "Pra Sempre"
- NX Zero feat. Emicida, Yo-Yo and DJ King – "Só Rezo 0.2"

==== Best New Act ====
- Criolo
- Apanhador Só
- CW7
- Marcelo Jeneci
- Tulipa Ruiz

==== MTV Bet ====
- Karol Conká
- O Lendário Chucrobillyman
- Rancore
- Start
- Tono

==== Best Album ====
- Cavalera Conspiracy – "Blunt Force Trauma"
- Criolo – "Nó Na Orelha"
- Marcelo Camelo – "Toque Dela"
- Marcelo Jeneci – "Feito pra Acabar"
- NX Zero – "Projeto Paralelo"

==== Best Album Art ====
- Tiê – "A Coruja e o Coração" (by Rita Wainer)
- Copacabana Club – "Tropical Splash" (by Rimon Guimarães)
- CSS – "La Liberación" (by Lovefoxxx)
- Garotas Suecas – "Escaldante Banda" (by Greg McKeighan)
- Kassin – "Sonhando Devagar" (by Philippe Leon)

=== Popular voting ===
==== Best International Act ====
- Adele
- Arcade Fire
- Beastie Boys
- Beyoncé
- Britney Spears
- Foo Fighters
- Kanye West
- Katy Perry
- Lady Gaga
- The Strokes

==== Hit of the Year ====
- CW7 – "Me Acorde pra Vida"
- Emicida – "Rua Augusta"
- Fake Number – "Primeira Lembrança"
- Flora Matos – "Pretin"
- Forfun – "Quem Vai, Vai"
- Fresno – "Eu Sei"
- Marcelo Jeneci – "Felicidade"
- NX Zero – "Onde Estiver"
- Rancore – "Jeito Livre"
- Start – "Que Vença o Melhor"

==== Web Hit of the Year ====
- Larica dus Muleke - Tô com fome, quero leite ("Hunger of the boys - I´m hungry, want milk") - Funk Carioca video performed by kids.
- Magaly Carioca - Woman dressed as Maurício de Sousa's Maggy dancing electronic music at Rio de Janeiro.
- Phoenix - Liztomania - Ribeirão Preto Brat Pack Mashup - Mashup with Phoenix's Liztomania and a video with performance of men dressed as children's characters.
- Avassaladores - Sou Foda ("The Overwhelming Ones - I'm fuck") - Funk carioca video music.
- Friday (versão Inri Cristo) - Parody of Rebecca Black's Friday by Inri Cristo's disciples.

==== Best Web Video ====
- A Banda Mais Bonita da Cidade – "Oração"
- Banda Uó – "Shake do Amor"
- Ecos Falsos – "Spam Do Amor"
- Móveis Coloniais de Acaju – "O Tempo"
- Skank – "De Repente"

== VMBB (The B-side of VMB) ==
It's the VMB 2011 parallel broadcasting for web. This year, it gained a larger structure than the previous editions. Hosted by Bento Ribeiro, it received the MTV Comedy Cast and all the appearances, presentations and its exclusive categories were focused on the humor.

=== Nominations ===
==== Best Video with People Walking ====
- Lurdes da Luz – Andei
- Start – Que Vença o Melhor
- A Banda Mais Bonita da Cidade – Oração

==== Wettest Video ====
- Mallu Magalhães – Nem Fé, Nem Santo
- Fresno – Eu Sei
- Pitty - Só Agora

==== Best Fade Out in a Video ====
- Fake Number – Primeira Lembrança
- Marcelo Jeneci – Felicidade
- Emicida – Então Toma

==== Best Figuration in a National Video ====
- Criolo – Subirusdoistiozin
- SIRsir – Down
- Lurdes da Luz – Andei

==== Best Band Name with Letters and Numbers ====
- NX Zero
- CPM 22
- CW7

== Appearances ==
- Restart — presented Best Song
- Adriane Galisteu - presented Best Album Art
- Rafael Cortez and Márvio Lúcio (Carioca) as "Jô Suado" (a Jô Soares' satire) - presented Video of the Year
- Bia and Branca Feres — introduced NX Zero, Rancore and One Night Only
- Marcelo Adnet and Dinho Ouro Preto — introduced Cláudia Leitte and Jean Wyllys's appearance
- Cláudia Leitte and Jean Wyllys — presented Best New Act
- PC Siqueira and Luísa Marilac — presented Web Hit of the Year
- Tiê and Digão — introduced Mallu Magalhães, Arnaldo Antunes, Erasmo Carlos and Marcelo Jeneci
- Marcelo Adnet (dressed as Jo Calderoni) and Dani Calabresa (dressed as Katy Perry) — presented MTV Bet
- MV Bill — introduced Criolo and Caetano Veloso
- Carol Trentini and Lucas — presented Best International Act
- Michel Teló (with recorded participation of Paula Fernandes and Luan Santana) — presented Hit of the Year
- Rogério Flausino and Dado Villa-Lobos — introduced Marcelo Camelo
- MariMoon — presented Best Web Video
- Wanessa and Jana Rosa — introduced Marina Lima, featuring Karina Buhr, Bárbara Eugênia, Nina Becker, Tulipa Ruiz and Edgard Scandurra
- Ellen Jabour — presented Best Album
- Lea T and Anderson Silva — presented Act of the Year

=== VMBB appearances ===
- Paulinho Serra and Tatá Werneck — presented the beginning of all the VMB 2011 commercial breaks
- Rafael Cortez and Márvio Lúcio, as "Jô Suado"
- Dani Calabresa, as Hebe Camargo and Gui Santana, as Zeca Camargo - presented Most Wet Video
- Gui Santana as William Bonner — presented Best Figuration in a National Video
- Luísa Marilac and Avassaladores, performers of the winner of Web Hit of the Year, "Sou Foda"
- Dani Calabresa, as Suzana Vieira
- Edu Elias and Luiz Thunderbird — presented Best Fade Out in a Video
- Gui Santana, as Sidney Magal
- Tatá Werneck, as Roxanne (a Comédia MTV character)
- José Mojica Marins and Paulo Tiefenthaler — presented Best Video with People Walking
- Rodrigo Capella, as Dr. Gay (a Robert Rey satire, from Comédia MTV) and Rafael Queiroga, as Fábio Renato (a Comédia MTV character) — presented Best Band Name with Letters and Numbers

== Performances ==
- Emicida, Guizado, Nação Zumbi and Seu Jorge — "Você e eu, eu e você"
- NX Zero and Rancore — "Só Rezo" and "Jeito Livre" / Di Ferrero and One Night Only — "Can You Feel it Tonight"
- Mallu Magalhães, Arnaldo Antunes, Erasmo Carlos and Marcelo Janeci — "Eu Preciso Encontrar um Amigo"
- Criolo and Caetano Veloso — "'Não Existe Amor Em SP"
- Marcelo Camelo — "Ôô" / Marcelo D2, Karol Conká, Helinho (Ponto de Equilíbrio), Lurdez da Luz, Flora Mattos and Start — "Eu já sabia", "Que Vença O Melhor", "Andei", "Pretin" and "Boa Noite"
- Marina Lima, featuring Karina Buhr, Bárbara Eugênia, Nina Becker, Tulipa Ruiz and Edgard Scandurra — "Pra Começar"
- Garotas Suecas, Banda Uó, and Gaby Amarantos — "Banho de Bucha" / "Shake do Amor" / "Xirley"
