= Superstar (Brazilian TV series) season 2 =

Superstar
- Season 2
- Hosted by: Fernanda Lima; André Marques; Rafa Brites
- Judges: Paulo Ricardo; Sandy; Thiaguinho
- Winners: Lucas & Orelha
- Runner-up: Scalene

Release
- Original network: Rede Globo
- Original release: April 12 – July 12, 2015

Season chronology
- ← Previous; Season 1 Next → Season 3

The second season of SuperStar premiered live on Rede Globo on Sunday, April 12, 2015 at 11:30 p.m. (BRT) and 10:30 p.m. (AMT) during the 2015–16 Brazilian television season. The prizes for the winning band were R$ 500,000, a Ford Ka and a recording contract with Som Livre.

== Hosts and experts ==
The experts of SuperStar

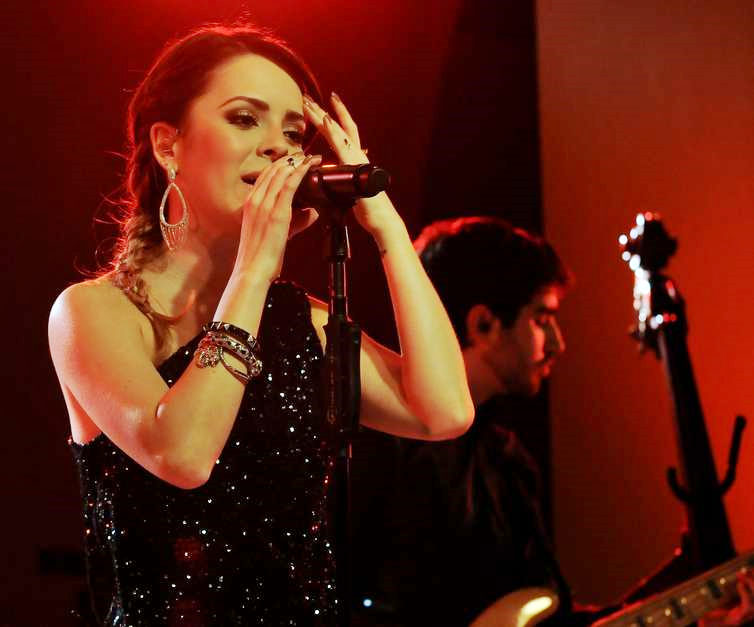
Sandy

=== Hosts ===
Fernanda Lima and André Marques returned as the hosts, while actress Fernanda Paes Leme was replaced by TV host Rafa Brites as backstage interviewer.

=== Experts ===
The entire panel was replaced from the first season. RPM frontman and musician Paulo Ricardo, Latin Grammy Award–nominee singer and actress Sandy and pagode singer-songwriter Thiaguinho were the three experts for this season.

== The auditions ==
Key
– Expert vote "Yes"
– Expert vote "No"
– Band joined this expert's team by choice
– Band joined this expert's team by default
– Band reached + 70%, finished in the top 5 and advanced to SuperPass
– Band reached + 70%, finished out the top 5 and was sent to Wild Card
– Band eliminated

=== Week 1 ===
Aired: April 12, 2015

Running order

Band	Song	Public vote	Experts' vote			Total vote	Rank night
Band	Song	Public vote	P. Ricardo	Sandy	Thiaguinho	Total vote	Rank night
StellaBella	"O Que Eu Quiser"	29%				36%	8th
Samba Livre	"Mande um Sinal"	43%				64%	7th
Eletronaipe	"Na Rua, na Chuva, na Fazenda"	56%				77%	3rd
Leash	"Contando as Horas"	58%				72%	5th
Vibrações	"Ela Partiu"	57%				78%	2nd
Wannabe Java	"Down the Sea"	57%				71%	6th
Trio Sinhá Flor	"Na Puxada da Rede"	63%				84%	1st
Tianastácia	"Cabrobró"	56%				77%	3rd

=== Week 2 ===
Aired: April 19, 2015

Running order

Band	Song	Public vote	Experts' vote			Total vote	Rank night
Band	Song	Public vote	P. Ricardo	Sandy	Thiaguinho	Total vote	Rank night
Consciência Tranquila	"Sente a Vibe"	52%				73%	6th
Kita	"You"	62%				76%	5th
Motel 11-11	"A Vida Como Ela É"	37%				51%	7th
Trio Macaíba	"Atazanado"	50%				50%	8th
Supercombo	"Piloto Automático"	62%				83%	4th
Dois Africanos	"Eu Sou de Lá"	67%				88%	1st
The Moondogs	"Rock'n Rollin'"	63%				84%	3rd
Big Time Orchestra	"Vem Quente"	66%				87%	2nd

=== Week 3 ===
Aired: April 26, 2015

Running order

Band	Song	Public vote	Experts' vote			Total vote	Rank night
Band	Song	Public vote	P. Ricardo	Sandy	Thiaguinho	Total vote	Rank night
Radio Radar	"Times Like These"	49%				70%	6th
Talagaço	"Deixa Ele Beber"	52%				59%	8th
Scambo	"Depois de Ver"	63%				84%	3rd
Menina Faceira	"Te Dar Um Beijo"	43%				43%	9th
Devir	"Rude"	69%				90%	1st
Lucas & Orelha	"Presságio"	65%				86%	2nd
Supercrow	"Piece of My Heart"	47%				68%	7th
Yegor y Los Bandoleros	"Corazón Espinado"	59%				80%	5th
Serial Funkers	"A Batida do Coração"	61%				82%	4th

=== Week 4 ===
Aired: May 3, 2015

Running order

Band	Song	Public vote	Experts' vote			Total vote	Rank night
Band	Song	Public vote	P. Ricardo	Sandy	Thiaguinho	Total vote	Rank night
Grupo Zueira	"Música Boa"	58%				79%	2nd
Stereosound	"Around the World"	53%				74%	5th
Grupo Pra Valer	"Final de Tarde"	48%				62%	8th
Scalene	"Surreal"	68%				89%	1st
Falange	"Demons"	67%				74%	4th
Versalle	"Verde Mansidão"	57%				71%	7th
Sabatiê	"De Maré"	51%				58%	9th
Os Gonzagas	"Vem Morena"	56%				77%	3rd
Reverse	"Tempo e Espaço"	52%				73%	6th

=== Week 5 ===
Aired: May 10, 2015

Running order

Band	Song	Public vote	Experts' vote			Total vote	Rank night
Band	Song	Public vote	P. Ricardo	Sandy	Thiaguinho	Total vote	Rank night
Dona Zaíra	"Isso Aqui Ta Bom Demais"	56%				77%	4th
Facção Caipira	"Blues Brasileiro Foragido Americano"	55%				76%	5th
Breno & Caio César	"7 Bilhões"	44%				58%	7th
Eu, Tu, Eles	"Eu Vou Casar Mais Ela"	44%				44%	9th
Wild Card
Versalle	"Mente Cheia"	60%				81%	1st
Consciência Tranquila	"Deixa Isso Pra Lá"	59%				80%	3rd
Wannabe Jalva	"Miracle"	35%				49%	8th
Reverse	"Imagina"	60%				81%	1st
Radio Radar	"Tão Perto"	53%				60%	6th

== SuperPass ==
Key
– Saved by expert
– Band eliminated

=== Week 6 ===
Aired: May 17, 2015

Running order

Band	Song	Public vote	Experts' vote			Guests vote	Total vote
Band	Song	Public vote	P. Ricardo	Sandy	Thiaguinho	Guests vote	Total vote
Big Time Orchestra	"Meu Erro"	54%				2%	77%
Stereosound	"Será Que Isso é Samba?"	55%				2%	78%
Scambo	"Janela"	53%				2%	76%
Falange	"Need You Now" ft. "Easy Lover"	59%				2%	82%
Scalene	"Danse Macabre"	63%				2%	86%
The Moondogs	"Black & White Woman"	49%				2%	65%
Supercombo	"Epitáfio"	61%				2%	84%
Tianastácia	"O Sol"	54%				2%	70%

=== Week 7 ===
Aired: May 24, 2015

Running order

Band	Song	Public vote	Experts' vote			Guests vote	Total vote
Band	Song	Public vote	P. Ricardo	Sandy	Thiaguinho	Guests vote	Total vote
Devir	"All About That Bass"	63%				2%	86%
Reverse	"Lá Vem Você"	45%				2%	68%
Dona Zaíra	"Tenho Sede" ft. "Rio de Lágrimas"	62%				2%	85%
Eletronaipe	"Só Eu Sei"	59%				2%	82%
Versalle	"Modelo Adequado"	62%				2%	85%
Os Gonzagas	"Cheiro de Carolina" ft. "Carolina"	59%				2%	82%
Kita	"Twisted Complicated World"	57%				2%	80%
Trio Sinhá Flor	"Asa Branca"	53%				2%	76%

=== Week 8 ===
Aired: May 31, 2015

Running order

Band	Song	Public vote	Experts' vote			Guests vote	Total vote
Band	Song	Public vote	P. Ricardo	Sandy	Thiaguinho	Guests vote	Total vote
Lucas & Orelha	"Cobertor"	63%				2%	86%
Consciência Tranquila	"Superstition"	48%				2%	71%
Vibrações	"Bom Amigo"	53%				2%	76%
Dois Africanos	"Djuba"	61%				2%	84%
Grupo Zueira	"Mas que Nada (This Love)"	60%				2%	83%
Yegor y Los Bandoleros	"Bailando"	56%				2%	72%
Leash	"Número 1"	41%				2%	50%
Serial Funkers	"Coisa Assim"	55%				2%	78%

== SuperFilter ==
– Band mentored by Paulo Ricardo
– Band mentored by Sandy
– Band mentored by Thiaguinho

=== Week 9 ===
Aired: June 7, 2015

Running order

Band	Song	Public vote	Experts' vote			Guests vote	Total vote
Band	Song	Public vote	P. Ricardo	Sandy	Thiaguinho	Guests vote	Total vote
Os Gonzagas	"Expresso 2222" ft. "We Will Rock You"	53.50%				—	74.50%
Big Time Orchestra	"Cantaloupe Island" ft. "Zoot Suit Riot"	50.11%				2%	73.11%
Scalene	"Náufrago"	56.08%				—	77.08%
Lucas & Orelha	"Não Vou Esperar"	56.11%				—	77.11%
Versalle	"Ando Meio Desligado"	50.70%				—	71.70%
Devir	"Da Janela"	53.35%				2%	76.35%
Grupo Zueira	"Quero Toda Noite" ft. "Ela Vai Voltar"	50.57%				—	71.57%
Vibrações	"A Nuvem Passará"	48.49%				2%	71.49%
Stereosound	"Ideologia" ft. "Queimando Tudo"	40.74%				—	61.74%

=== Week 10 ===
Aired: June 14, 2015

Running order

Band	Song	Public vote	Experts' vote			Guests vote	Total vote
Band	Song	Public vote	P. Ricardo	Sandy	Thiaguinho	Guests vote	Total vote
Kita	"Hoje Eu Quero Sair Só"	55%				4%	80%
Eletronaipe	"Nosso Lugar"	43%				—	64%
Supercombo	"Sol da Manhã"	57%				—	78%
Serial Funkers	"Mina do Condomínio"	58%				—	79%
Dois Africanos	"Sonho de Sucesso"	59%				—	80%
Dona Zaíra	"Tome Forró"	56%				—	77%
Falange	"Quero Mais (Summer Nights)"	42%				—	49%
Scambo	"O Tempo Não Para"	58%				—	79%
Consciência Tranquila	"Imunização Racional"	53%				2%	76%

== The solos ==
=== Elimination chart ===
Band	Week 11	Week 12	Week 13	Week 14		
Band	Week 11	Week 12	Week 13	Top 4	Top 3	Top 2
Lucas & Orelha	3rd 73.99%	3rd 66%	2nd 69%	2nd 57%	1st 59.87%	Winner; 64%
Scalene	1st 86.72%	2nd 67%	1st 70%	1st 60%	2nd 59.40%	Runner-up; 55%
Versalle	9th 66.76%	5th 64%	3rd 67%	3rd 56%	3rd 53%	Eliminated (Week 14)
Dois Africanos	4th 73.15%	1st 81%	4th 64%	4th 54%	Eliminated (Week 14)	
Serial Funkers	2nd 79.66%	4th 65%	5th 59%	Eliminated (Week 13)		
Devir	7th 69.18%	7th 61%	6th 58%	Eliminated (Week 13)		
Os Gonzagas	5th 69.95%	5th 64%	7th 49%	Eliminated (Week 13)		
Big Time Orchestra	8th 68.02%	8th 54%	Eliminated (Week 12)			
Dona Zaíra	6th 69.51%	8th 54%	Eliminated (Week 12)			
Supercombo	10th 66.47%	Eliminated (Week 11)				
Kita	11th 62.41%	Eliminated (Week 11)				
Scambo	12th 61.21%	Eliminated (Week 11)				

=== Week 11 ===
Top 12

Aired: June 21, 2015

Running order

Band	Song	Public vote	Experts' vote			Total vote	Rank night
Band	Song	Public vote	P. Ricardo	Sandy	Thiaguinho	Total vote	Rank night
Lucas & Orelha	"Sonhar"	52.99%				73.99%	3rd
Big Time Orchestra	"Sonífera Ilha"	47.02%				68.02%	8th
Dois Africanos	"Rock with You"	52.15%				73.15%	4th
Os Gonzagas	"Tropicana"	48.95%				69.95%	5th
Supercombo	"Saco Cheio"	45.47%				66.47%	10th
Kita	"Realize"	41.41%				62.41%	11th
Versalle	"Sem Hesitar"	45.76%				66.76%	9th
Dona Zaíra	"Qui nem Jiló"	48.51%				69.51%	6th
Scambo	"Meu Ar"	40.21%				61.21%	12th
Serial Funkers	"September"	58.66%				79.66%	2nd
Devir	"Banho de Mar"	48.18%				69.18%	7th
Scalene	"Amanheceu"	65.72%				86.12%	1st

=== Week 12 ===
Top 9

Aired: June 28, 2015

Running order

Band	Song	Public vote	Experts' vote			Total vote	Rank night
Band	Song	Public vote	P. Ricardo	Sandy	Thiaguinho	Total vote	Rank night
Devir	"Segue o Som"	61%	—	—	—	61%	7th
Dona Zaíra	"Coração Bobo" ft. "A Praieira"	54%	—	—	—	54%	8th
Serial Funkers	"Noite de Prazer"	65%	—	—	—	65%	4th
Versalle	"No One Knows" ft. "Que País É Este"	57%	—		—	64%	5th
Lucas & Orelha	"Preta Perfeita"	66%	—	—	—	66%	3rd
Big Time Orchestra	"Buraco da Camiseta"	54%	—	—	—	54%	8th
Os Gonzagas	"Lindo Lago do Amor" ft. "Smoke on the Water"	64%	—	—	—	64%	5th
Scalene	"Nós > Eles"	60%		—	—	67%	2nd
Dois Africanos	"Am I Wrong" ft. "Street Dreams"	74%	—	—		81%	1st

=== Week 13 ===
Top 7

Aired: July 5, 2015

Running order

Band	Song	Public vote	Experts' vote			Total vote	Rank night
Band	Song	Public vote	P. Ricardo	Sandy	Thiaguinho	Total vote	Rank night
Lucas & Orelha	"Ritmo Perfeito"	62%	—	—		69%	2nd
Serial Funkers	"Let's Groove"	59%	—	—	—	59%	5th
Devir	"I'm Yours" ft. "Andar com Fé"	58%	—	—	—	58%	6th
Versalle	"Vinte Graus"	60%	—		—	67%	3rd
Os Gonzagas	"Amor da Gota"	49%	—	—	—	49%	7th
Scalene	"Tiro Cego"	63%		—	—	70%	1st
Dois Africanos	"Tá Calor"	64%	—	—	—	64%	4th

=== Week 14 ===
Top 4

Aired: July 12, 2015

Running order

Band	Song	Public vote	Experts' vote			Total vote	Final rank
Band	Song	Public vote	P. Ricardo	Sandy	Thiaguinho	Total vote	Final rank
First round
Versalle	"Marte"	56%	No experts' vote; public votes alone and decides who is eliminated.				3rd
Lucas & Orelha	"Dependente"	57%	No experts' vote; public votes alone and decides who is eliminated.				2nd
Scalene	"Nunca Apague a Luz"	60%	No experts' vote; public votes alone and decides who is eliminated.				1st
Dois Africanos	"Todos Humanos"	54%	No experts' vote; public votes alone and decides who is eliminated.				4th
Second round
Versalle	"Tão Simples"	53%	No experts' vote; public votes alone and decides who is eliminated.				3rd
Lucas & Orelha	"Por que?"	59.87%	No experts' vote; public votes alone and decides who is eliminated.				1st
Scalene	"Legado"	59.40%	No experts' vote; public votes alone and decides who is eliminated.				2nd
Third round
Scalene	"A Luz e a Sombra"	55%	No experts' vote; public votes alone and decides who wins SuperStar.				2nd
Lucas & Orelha	"Menina Nerd"	64%	No experts' vote; public votes alone and decides who wins SuperStar.				1st

== Ratings and reception ==
=== Brazilian ratings ===
All numbers are in points and provided by IBOPE.

Week	Episode	Air Date	Timeslot (BRT)	Viewers (in points)	Rank Timeslot	Source
1	Auditions 1	April 12, 2015	Sunday 11:30 p.m.	11.9	1	
2	Auditions 2	April 19, 2015	Sunday 11:30 p.m.	10.9	1	
3	Auditions 3	April 26, 2015	Sunday 11:30 p.m.	11.5	1	
4	Auditions 4	May 3, 2015	Sunday 11:30 p.m.	09.8	1	
5	Auditions 5	May 10, 2015	Sunday 11:30 p.m.	10.3	1	
6	SuperPass 1	May 17, 2015	Sunday 11:30 p.m.	09.9	1	
7	SuperPass 2	May 24, 2015	Sunday 11:30 p.m.	10.0	2	
8	SuperPass 3	May 31, 2015	Sunday 11:30 p.m.	11.4	1	
9	SuperFilter 1	June 7, 2015	Sunday 11:30 p.m.	11.8	1	
10	SuperFilter 2	June 14, 2015	Sunday 11:30 p.m.	10.3	2	
11	Top 12	June 21, 2015	Sunday 11:30 p.m.	10.0	2	
12	Top 9	June 28, 2015	Sunday 11:30 p.m.	10.9	1	
13	Top 7	July 5, 2015	Sunday 11:30 p.m.	10.7	2	
14	Season Finale	July 12, 2015	Sunday 11:30 p.m.	13.2	1	

- In 2015, each point represents 67.000 households in São Paulo.
