= Fake Number =

Brazilian pop punk band

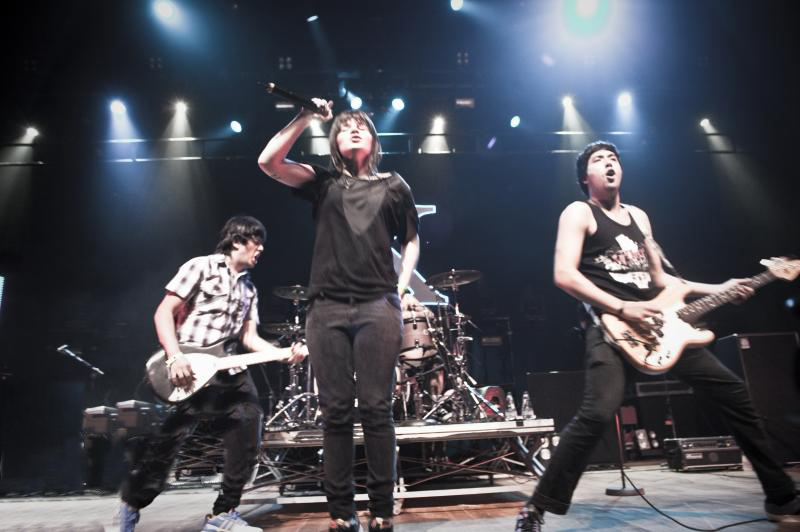
- The band performing in 2011

Background information
- Also known as: FKN
- Origin: Lorena, São Paulo, Brazil
- Genres: Pop-punk; pop rock; emo pop; alternative rock
- Years active: 2006–2014
- Labels: Urubuz Records, Arsenal Music, Blast Stage Records
- Past members: See below

Fake Number, also referred to as FKN, was a Brazilian pop punk band which reached fame in the mid- to late 2000s.

== History ==
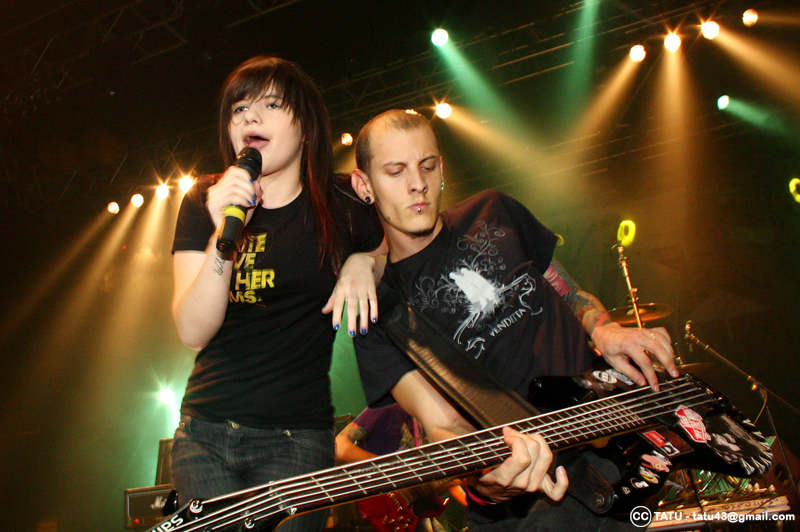
Vocalist Elektra and guitarist Pinguim at a performance in 2008

Fake Number was formed in March 2006 in the city of Lorena, São Paulo by vocalist and sole female member Elektra, guitarist Pinguim (who was, alongside Elektra, the only founding member to remain in all of the group's line-ups), drummer Tony and bassist Mark, with second guitarist Gabriel ("Gah") joining some months later. Citing Charlie Brown Jr., Blink-182 and Paramore as major influences, their first release was the single "Segredos que Guardei" in 2007; pre-produced by Lampadinha, who previously worked with Charlie Brown Jr. and CPM 22, a music video for it was made, featuring a guest appearance by famous blogger MariMoon. Catching the attention of label Urubuz Records, they would release soon after their debut album Cinco Faces de um Segredo. In 2009, they were chosen the "Best Brazilian Band of 2008" by Zona Punk.

2010 saw the release of their second, self-titled album; produced by Rick Bonadio, it was one of the most downloaded of the year. In 2011 they underwent major line-up changes, with Gah, Tony and Mark leaving the band, being replaced by bassist Marcus Maia and drummer André Mattera. The same year they opened shows for Paramore's Brand New Eyes World Tour in São Paulo and Rio de Janeiro, following a petition which reached over 7,000 signatures, and also covered Rebecca Black's song "Friday" to celebrate their 5th anniversary. Later that year, their song "Primeira Lembrança" was nominated for the MTV Video Music Brazil award, in the "Hit of the Year" category through popular voting.

In 2012 they released their third and ultimately final album, Contra o Tempo; a music video was made for its single "Último Trem", which counted with guest appearances by sixteen bands, including NX Zero, Fresno, Hateen, Strike, Scracho and Rancore.

In April 2014 they took part in the first season of Rede Globo's reality show Superstar, performing a cover of Roberto Carlos' "O Portão"; however, they were eliminated following the first week.

In November 2014 the band announced through their Facebook page they would be splitting up.

== Members ==
=== Last line-up ===
- Elektra – vocals (2006–2014)
- Pinguim – electric guitar (2006–2014)
- André Mattera – drums (2011–2014)

=== Former members ===
- Diablo – bass guitar (2006–2008)
- Tony – drums (2006–2011)
- Mark – bass guitar (2008–2011)
- Gah – electric guitar (2006–2009)
- Vermelho – electric guitar (2006–2011)
- Marcus Maia – bass guitar (2011–2013)

== Discography ==
=== Studio albums ===
Year	Album
2007	Cinco Faces de um Segredo: Label: Urubuz Records; Format: CD
2010	Fake Number: Label: Arsenal Music; Format: CD
2012	Contra o Tempo: Label: Blast Stage Records; Format: CD
