= Superstar (Brazilian TV series) season 1 =

Superstar
- Season 1
- Hosted by: Fernanda Lima; André Marques; Fernanda Paes Leme
- Judges: Ivete Sangalo; Fábio Jr.; Dinho Ouro Preto
- Winner: Malta
- Runner-up: Jamz

Release
- Original network: Rede Globo
- Original release: April 6 – July 6, 2014

Season chronology
- Next → Season 2

The first season of SuperStar, premiered on Rede Globo on Sunday, April 6, 2014 at 11/10 pm (BRT/AMT) during the 2014–15 Brazilian television season.

The winning band is entitled to a R$ 500,000 prize, a brand new Ford Ka and a recording contract with Som Livre.

Rock band Malta won the competition on July 6, beating R&B band Jamz with 74% of the final vote.

== Host and experts ==
The experts of SuperStar

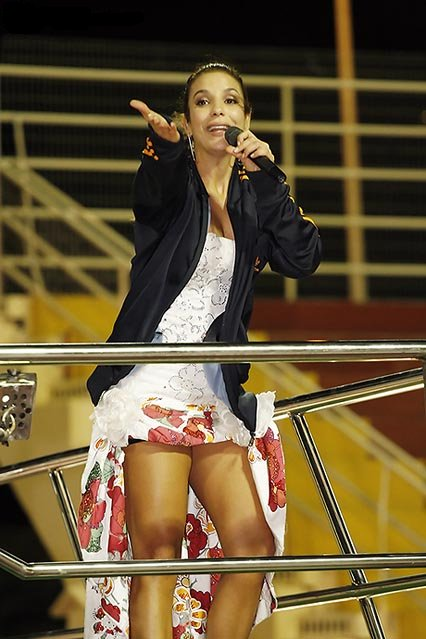
Ivete Sangalo

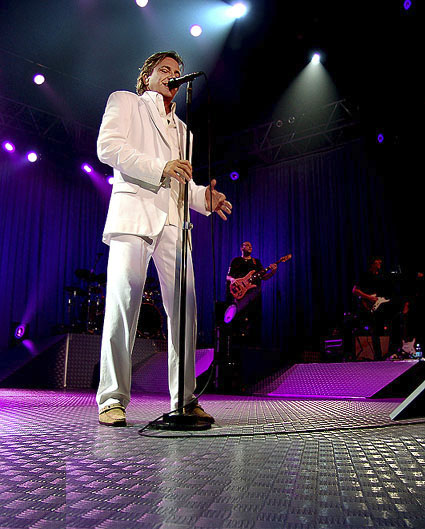
Fábio Jr.

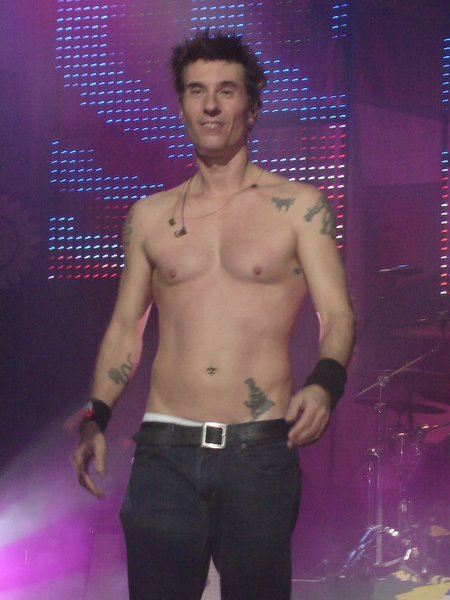
Dinho Ouro Preto

=== Hosts ===
Fernanda Lima and André Marques were the hosts, while actress Fernanda Paes Leme serves as backstage interviewer.

=== Experts ===
Latin Grammy Award–winning singer Ivete Sangalo, singer and actor Fábio Jr. and Capital Inicial frontman and musician Dinho Ouro Preto were the 3 experts for this season.

== Selection process ==
Online applications were open from February 20, 2014 until March 15, 2014. All band members were required to be at least 16 years old to apply.

== The auditions ==
Key
– Expert vote "Yes"
– Expert vote "No"
– Band joined this expert's team by expert's consensus
– Band eliminated

=== Week 1 ===
Aired: April 6, 2014

Order	Band	Song	Public vote	Experts' vote			Total vote
Order	Band	Song	Public vote	Ivete	Fábio	Dinho	Total vote
1	Villa Baggage	"Dormi na Praça"	48%				55%
2	Malta	"Memórias (Come Wake Me Up)"	59%				80%
3	Freeside	"Vem Com Noiz"	35%				56%
4	Batidão	"Logo Eu"	34%				41%
5	Fake Number	"O Portão"	36%				57%
6	Tarcisio Meira's Band	"Cura Gay"	64%				85%
7	Yute Lions	"Johnny B. Goode"	63%				84%
8	Tô de Cara	"Sou o Cara pra Você"	67%				74%

=== Week 2 ===
Aired: April 13, 2014

Order	Band	Song	Public vote	Experts' vote			Total vote
Order	Band	Song	Public vote	Ivete	Fábio	Dinho	Total vote
1	Grupo do Bola	"Papo Reto"	63%				84%
2	Medulla	"The Pretender"	36%				57%
3	Fuzzcas	"Deveras"	63%				77%
4	Radio Hits	"Treasure"	70%				84%
5	Suricato	"Come Together"	70%				91%
6	Trio Violada	"Demorou"	72%				72%
7	The Soul Session	"Mandamentos Black"	55%				76%
8	Cluster Sisters	"It Don't Mean a Thing"	54%				75%
9	Instinto	"Inútil"	56%				77%

=== Week 3 ===
Aired: April 20, 2014

Order	Band	Song	Public vote	Experts' vote			Total vote
Order	Band	Song	Public vote	Ivete	Fábio	Dinho	Total vote
1	Groovy Town	"Take it Easy my Brother Charles"	49%				63%
2	CW7	"You Oughta Know"	42%				42%
3	Lion Jump	"Na Rua, Na Chuva, Na Fazenda"	59%				80%
4	Depois do Fim	"Idiota"	55%				76%
5	Mary Di	"Meu Sangue Ferve Por Você"	51%				72%
6	Cidade do Reggae	"Feito Carrossel"	68%				89%
7	Move Over	"Roar"	73%				94%
8	Luan & Forró Estilizado	"Jeito Carinhoso"	59%				73%
9	Química	"Aquilo"	48%				55%

=== Week 4 ===
Aired: April 27, 2014

Order	Band	Song	Public vote	Experts' vote			Total vote
Order	Band	Song	Public vote	Ivete	Fábio	Dinho	Total vote
1	Jamz	"Happy"	66%				87%
2	Lapada	"Ainda Bem"	50%				71%
3	Melody	"Lady Marmalade"	70%				91%
4	Curtindo a Vida	"Desencana"	54%				75%
5	Tipo Uísque	"Royals"	51%				72%
6	Macucos	"Is This Love"	58%				72%
7	Gafieira Carioca	"Flor de Lis"	66%				87%
8	Chaparral	"Amo Noite e Dia"	35%				49%
9	Bicho de Pé	"Nosso Xote"	63%				84%

== The duels ==
– Band mentored by Ivete
– Band mentored by Fábio
– Band mentored by Dinho

=== Week 5 ===
Aired: May 4, 2014

Order	Band	Song	Public vote	Experts' vote			Total vote
Order	Band	Song	Public vote	Ivete	Fábio	Dinho	Total vote
1	Tô de Cara	"Pega Mas Não Se Apega"	47%				61%
1	Malta	"Diz Pra Mim"	67%				88%
2	Trio Violada	"Vamos Fazer Festa"	43%				64%
2	Tarcisio Meira's Band	"Homem Com H"	48%				69%
3	The Soul Session	"Acredite Irmão"	47%				68%
3	Suricato	"Trem"	66%				87%

=== Week 6 ===
Aired: May 11, 2014

Order	Band	Song	Public vote	Experts' vote			Total vote
Order	Band	Song	Public vote	Ivete	Fábio	Dinho	Total vote
1	Mary Di	"Back to Black"	45%				66%
1	Move Over	"Wrecking Ball"	73%				94%
2	Yute Lions	"Música de Jah"	61%				82%
2	Cidade do Reggae	"História de Amor"	50%				57%
3	Depois do Fim	"Mulher de Fases"	43%				64%
3	Fuzzcas	"Tic Tac do Amor"	49%				69%
4	Macucos	"Além do Mar"	55%				69%
4	Luan & Forró Estilizado	"Esperando na Janela"	60%				81%

=== Week 7 ===
Aired: May 18, 2014

Order	Band	Song	Public vote	Experts' vote			Total vote
Order	Band	Song	Public vote	Ivete	Fábio	Dinho	Total vote
1	Radio Hits	"Let's Get It Started"	60%				81%
1	Jamz	"Suit & Tie"	62%				83%
2	Grupo do Bola	"Natiruts Reggae Power"	58%				79%
2	Curtindo a Vida	"Sufoco"	46%				60%
3	Instinto	"Pega Ladrão"	44%				65%
3	Melody	"Crazy In Love"	58%				72%
4	Gafieira Carioca	"É"	51%				65%
4	Bicho de Pé	"Baião"	66%				87%
5	Cluster Sisters	"Tu Vuò Fà L'Americano"	59%				80%
5	Lion Jump	"A Novidade"	52%				73%

== The solos ==
=== Elimination chart ===
Band	Week 8	Week 9	Week 10	Week 11	Week 12	Week 13	Week 14	
Band	Week 8	Week 9	Week 10	Week 11	Week 12	Week 13	Top 4	Top 2
Malta	1st 87%	1st 85%	2nd 65%	2nd 80%	1st 87%	1st 76%	1st 70%	Winner; 74%
Jamz	6th 77%	3rd 81%	6th 59%	3rd 79%	2nd 82%	4th 61%	2nd 61%	Runner-Up; 47%
Luan & Forró Estilizado	2nd 81%	5th 76%	6th 59%	4th 76%	5th 72%	3rd 62%	3rd 56%	Eliminated (Week 14)
Suricato	5th 78%	2nd 83%	3rd 62%	4th 76%	3rd 73%	2nd 66%	4th 50%	Eliminated (Week 14)
Move Over	2nd 81%	7th 72%	1st 68%	1st 81%	5th 72%	5th 51%	Eliminated (Week 13)	
Bicho de Pé	4th 79%	6th 76%	3rd 62%	6th 72%	3rd 73%	6th 49%	Eliminated (Week 13)	
Grupo do Bola	8th 75%	4th 77%	3rd 62%	7th 68%	7th 65%	Eliminated (Week 12)		
Cluster Sisters	9th 74%	8th 70%	8th 58%	8th 64%	Eliminated (Week 11)			
Melody	7th 76%	9th 65%	9th 49%	Eliminated (Week 10)				
Yute Lions	10th 72.9%	10th 63%	Eliminated (Week 9)					
Fuzzcas	11th 72.5%	Eliminated (Week 8)						
Tarcisio Meira's Band	12th 28%	Eliminated (Week 8)						

=== Week 8 ===
Top 12 Perform

Aired: May 25, 2014

Order	Band	Song	Public vote	Experts' vote			Total vote
Order	Band	Song	Public vote	Ivete	Fábio	Dinho	Total vote
1	Grupo do Bola	"Uma Brasileira"	54%				75%
2	Jamz	"Valerie"	56%				77%
3	Tarcisio Meira's Band	"Andando Pelado, Eu e o Cavalo"	28%				28%
4	Cluster Sisters	"Hold Tight"	53%				74%
5	Fuzzcas	"Bad Girl"	51%				72.5%
6	Bicho de Pé	"No Escurinho"	58%				79%
7	Suricato	"Um Tanto"	57%				78%
8	Yute Lions	"I Shot the Sheriff"	51%				72.9%
9	Melody	"Summer Days"	55%				76%
10	Move Over	"Respostas"	60%				81%
11	Malta	"Alguém"	66%				87%
12	Luan & Forró Estilizado	"Disparada" / "Rindo à Toa"	60%				81%

=== Week 9 ===
Top 10 Perform

Aired: June 1, 2014

Order	Band	Song	Public vote	Experts' vote			Total vote
Order	Band	Song	Public vote	Ivete	Fábio	Dinho	Total vote
1	Melody	"We Found Love"	51%				65%
2	Bicho de Pé	"Eu Só Quero Um Xodó"	55%				76%
3	Jamz	"Nothin' on You"	60%				81%
4	Yute Lions	"Reggae Music"	42%				63%
5	Move Over	"Stronger (What Doesn't Kill You)"	58%				72%
6	Luan & Forró Estilizado	"Gostoso Demais"	56%				77%
7	Cluster Sisters	"What a Wonderful World"	49%				70%
8	Grupo do Bola	"O Descobridor dos Sete Mares"	56%				77%
9	Malta	"Mais Que O Sol"	64%				85%
10	Suricato	"Hey Brother"	62%				83%

=== Week 10 ===
Top 9 Perform

Aired: June 8, 2014

Order	Band	Song	Public vote	Experts' vote			Total vote
Order	Band	Song	Public vote	Ivete	Fábio	Dinho	Total vote
1	Bicho de Pé	"Que Seja"	41%				62%
2	Melody	"Emotions"	35%				49%
3	Suricato	"Talvez"	41%				62%
4	Jamz	"The Way You Make Me Feel"	38%				59%
5	Luan & Forró Estilizado	"Solteiro na Sexta"	38%				59%
6	Cluster Sisters	"Hit the Road Jack"	37%				58%
7	Malta	"Baby"	44%				65%
8	Grupo do Bola	"Garota Nacional"	41%				62%
9	Move Over	"Pronta Para Andar"	47%				68%

=== Week 11 ===
Top 8 Perform

Aired: June 15, 2014

Order	Band	Song	Public vote	Experts' vote			Total vote
Order	Band	Song	Public vote	Ivete	Fábio	Dinho	Total vote
1	Cluster Sisters	"Tico-Tico no Fubá"	43%				64%
2	Grupo do Bola	"Sábado à Noite"	47%				68%
3	Bicho de Pé	"Frevo Mulher"	51%				72%
4	Suricato	"Inseparáveis"	55%				76%
5	Jamz	"Insano"	58%				79%
6	Move Over	"Decode"	60%				81%
7	Luan & Forró Estilizado	"Hora do Adeus" / "Coração"	55%				76%
8	Malta	"Nova História"	59%				80%

=== Week 12 ===
Top 7 Perform

Aired: June 22, 2014

Order	Band	Song	Public vote	Experts' vote			Total vote
Order	Band	Song	Public vote	Ivete	Fábio	Dinho	Total vote
1	Suricato	"Para Tudo Acontecer"	52%				73%
2	Move Over	"Para Te Entregar"	51%				72%
3	Grupo do Bola	"Festa"	44%				65%
4	Luan & Forró Estilizado	"Stairway..." / "Espumas ao Vento"	51%				72%
5	Malta	"Lendas"	66%				87%
6	Jamz	"Get Lucky" / "Lose Yourself..."	61%				82%
7	Bicho de Pé	"Com Que Roupa"	52%				73%

=== Week 13 ===
Top 6 Perform

Aired: June 29, 2014

Order	Band	Song	Public vote	Experts' vote			Total vote
Order	Band	Song	Public vote	Ivete	Fábio	Dinho	Total vote
1	Move Over	"Além de Nós Dois"	51%	—	—	—	51%
2	Bicho de Pé	"Anjo Tentador (Te Esperando)"	49%	—	—	—	49%
3	Suricato	"Brasileirinho" / "Roadhouse Blues"	61%		—	—	66%
4	Jamz	"Natural"	56%	—	—		61%
5	Malta	"I Don't Want to Miss a Thing"	71%	—		—	76%
6	Luan & Forró Estilizado	"Tocando em Frente" / "O Xote das Meninas"	62%	—	—	—	62%

=== Week 14 ===
Season Finale

Aired: July 6, 2014

First Round
Order	Band	Song	Public vote	Experts' vote			Total vote
Order	Band	Song	Public vote	Ivete	Fábio	Dinho Ouro Preto	Total vote
1	Jamz	"Wake Me Up"	61%	No experts' vote; public votes alone and decides who is eliminated and ultimately wins the competition.			
2	Suricato	"Born to Be Wild"	50%	No experts' vote; public votes alone and decides who is eliminated and ultimately wins the competition.			
3	Luan & Forró Estilizado	"Súplica Cearense" / "Riacho do Navio"	56%	No experts' vote; public votes alone and decides who is eliminated and ultimately wins the competition.			
4	Malta	"Entre Nós Dois"	70%	No experts' vote; public votes alone and decides who is eliminated and ultimately wins the competition.			
Second Round
1	Jamz	"Completa"	47%	Runner-Up			
2	Malta	"Supernova"	74%	SuperStar			

== Ratings and reception ==
The season was panned by the audience and critics. The series premiere was characterized by many technical failures as the SuperStar app did not work for many users, preventing public involvement. Constant error messages appeared on the screen. On Twitter, an avalanche of complaints and jokes about the problem.

There was also plenty of criticism reserved for hosts Fernanda Lima and André Marques, who failed to control the stage, and for the experts Ivete Sangalo, Fábio Jr. and Dinho Ouro Preto, for their lack of objectivity and anxiety in their speeches, sometimes contradictory.

=== Brazilian ratings ===
All numbers are in points and provided by IBOPE.

Episode	Title	Air Date	Viewers (in points)	Rank Timeslot	Rating Source
1	Auditions 1	April 6	12	1	
2	Auditions 2	April 13	12	1	
3	Auditions 3	April 20	12	1	
4	Auditions 4	April 27	12	1	
5	Duels 1	May 4	10	2	
6	Duels 2	May 11	10	2	
7	Duels 3	May 18	09	2	
8	Top 12 Perform	May 25	11	2	
9	Top 10 Perform	June 1	10	2	
10	Top 9 Perform	June 8	12	2	
11	Top 8 Perform	June 15	12	1	
12	Top 7 Perform	June 22	12	1	
13	Top 6 Perform	June 29	12	1	
14	Season Finale	July 6	13	1	

- In 2014, each point represents 65.000 households in São Paulo.
