= Superstar (Brazilian TV series) =

- Also known as: SuperStar
- Created by: Keshet Media Group
- Developed by: Screenz Cross Media LTD
- Presented by: Fernanda Lima
- Judges: List of judges
- Country of origin: Brazil
- No. of seasons: 3
- No. of episodes: 40

Production
- Running time: 75 minutes

Original release
- Network: TV Globo
- Release: April 6, 2014 – June 26, 2016

Superstar (also stylized SuperStar) is a Brazilian live reality television singing competition airing on TV Globo. Based on the Israeli singing competition Rising Star, the series was created by Keshet Media Group and developed by Screenz Cross Media LTD.

The show's format lets viewers vote for contestants via mobile apps. The winner is entitled to a R$ 500,000 prize, a new Ford Ka and a recording contract with Som Livre.

The Brazilian version only allows bands or groups to compete, not solo artists and duos, to avoid clashing with The Voice Brasil (also produced and broadcast by TV Globo during the Southern Hemisphere spring).

The series premiered on April 6, 2014. In June 2014, TV Globo renewed the show for a second season.

In November 2016, TV Globo canceled the series after three seasons due to declining viewership.

== Format ==
SuperStar features a cast of celebrity experts and considers the viewers at home the judges. During each performance, the audience at home is able to decide in real time whether or not a band is sent through to the next round by using a mobile voting app.

While the viewers at home are considered the "judges", the expert panelists also influence the vote. During most of the show, a yes vote from one of the judges added 7% to the performers total. In the semifinals, the expert's yes vote was lowered to a 5% add (and for only one band each). In the finale, the expert's yes vote only counts as a home judge vote.

=== Auditions ===
Each performance begins with the band singing behind a screen ('The Wall'). Once the band reaches 70% of "Yes" votes, the wall is raised and the band goes to the next round of the competition. Alongside the viewers' vote, three of the panelists (excluding the host) have 7% of the vote each, which will be added should they vote "Yes".

=== Duels ===
The bands are paired by the judges to face off in a duel. The first band to perform, chosen by a coin toss before the show, sings with the wall up and sets the benchmark for the second contestant. The second contestant sings with the wall down. If the second band betters the first band's vote total, the wall rises and the second band is through to the next round while the first band is eliminated; if the second band fails to raise the wall, the second band is eliminated and the first band is through.

=== Solos ===
The top 12 bands compete against each other in weeks of live broadcasts, where public voting narrows to a final group of bands and eventually declares the season's winner.

== Host and experts ==
=== Host ===
On March 20, 2014, the hosts were confirmed to be Fernanda Lima and André Marques as co-host. Actress Fernanda Paes Leme serves as backstage interviewer.

=== Experts ===
On March 24, 2014, Globo officially confirmed the three experts: Latin Grammy Award–winning singer Ivete Sangalo, singer–songwriter and actor Fábio Jr. and Capital Inicial frontman Dinho Ouro Preto. For the second season, Sandy, Thiaguinho and Paulo Ricardo replaced Ivete Sangalo, Fábio Jr. and Dinho Ouro Preto as experts. For the third season, Sandy and Paulo Ricardo returns and Daniela Mercury replace Thiaguinho.

==== List of experts ====
The experts of SuperStar

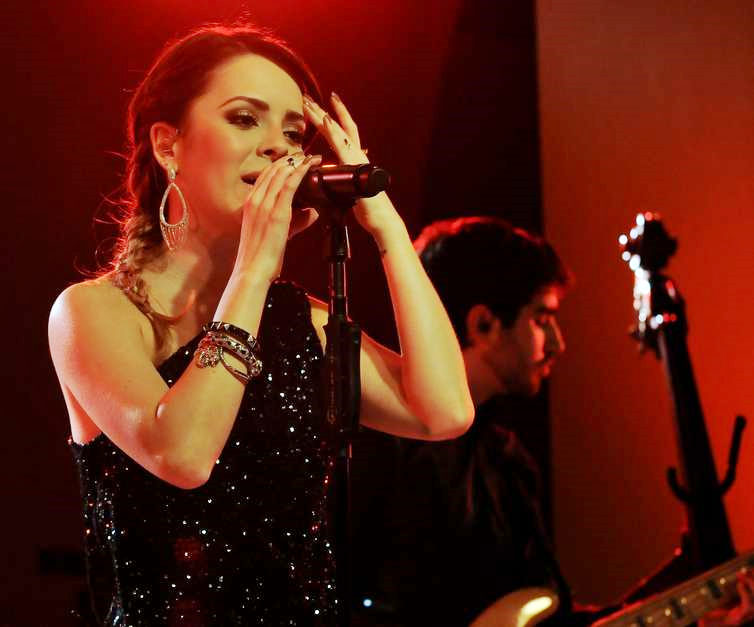
Sandy

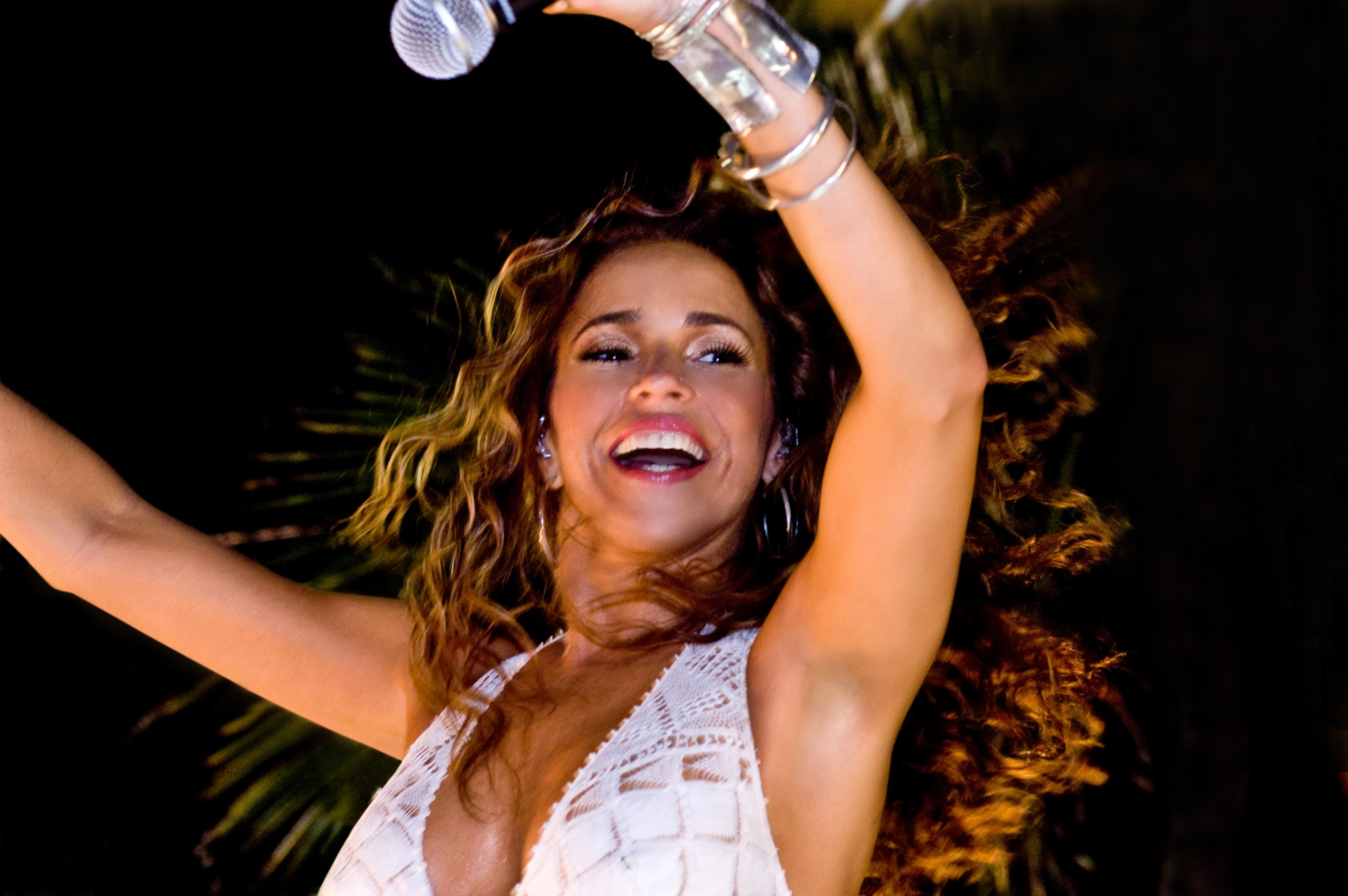
Daniela Mercury

Experts of Superstar
Expert	Seasons		
Expert	Season 1	Season 2	Season 3
Dinho Ouro Preto			
Fábio Jr.			
Ivete Sangalo			
Paulo Ricardo			
Sandy			
Thiaguinho			
Daniela Mercury			

== Series overview ==
Season	Winner	Runner-up	Third place	Fourth place
1	Malta (Post-grunge)	Jamz (R&B)	Luan & Forró Estilizado (Forró)	Suricato (Folk rock)
2	Lucas & Orelha (Melodic funk)	Scalene (Stoner rock)	Versalle (Indie rock)	Dois Africanos (Pop-rap)
3	Fulo de Mandacaru (Forró )	Plutão Já Foi Planeta (Indie pop)	OutroEu (Folk pop)	Bellamore (Pop-rock)

== Ratings and reception ==
The first season was panned by the audience and critics. The series premiere was characterized by many technical failures as the SuperStar app did not work for many users, preventing public involvement. Constant error messages appeared on the screen. On Twitter, an avalanche of complaints and jokes about the problem.

There was also plenty of criticism reserved for hosts Fernanda Lima and André Marques, who failed to control the stage, and for the experts Ivete Sangalo, Fábio Jr. and Dinho Ouro Preto, for their lack of objectivity and anxiety in their speeches, sometimes contradictory.

=== Brazilian ratings ===
All numbers are in points and provided by IBOPE.

Season	Timeslot (BRT)	Episodes	Premiered		Ended		TV season	Season viewers
Season	Timeslot (BRT)	Episodes	Date	Viewers (in points)	Date	Viewers (in points)	TV season	Season viewers
1	Sunday; 11:05 p.m.	14	April 6, 2014	12.0	July 6, 2014	12.7	2014–15	
2	Sunday; 11:20 p.m.	14	April 12, 2015	11.9	July 12, 2015	13.2	2015–16	
3	Sunday; 1:00 p.m.	12	April 10, 2016	10.5	June 26, 2016	9.5	2016–17	

- Each point represents a specific number of households in São Paulo.

2014: 65.000 households
2015: 67.000 households

2016: 69.000 households

Preceded by Revenge	Fantástico fall lead-out program Superstar	Succeeded by TBA
