= MariMoon =

Brazilian television host and digital influencer

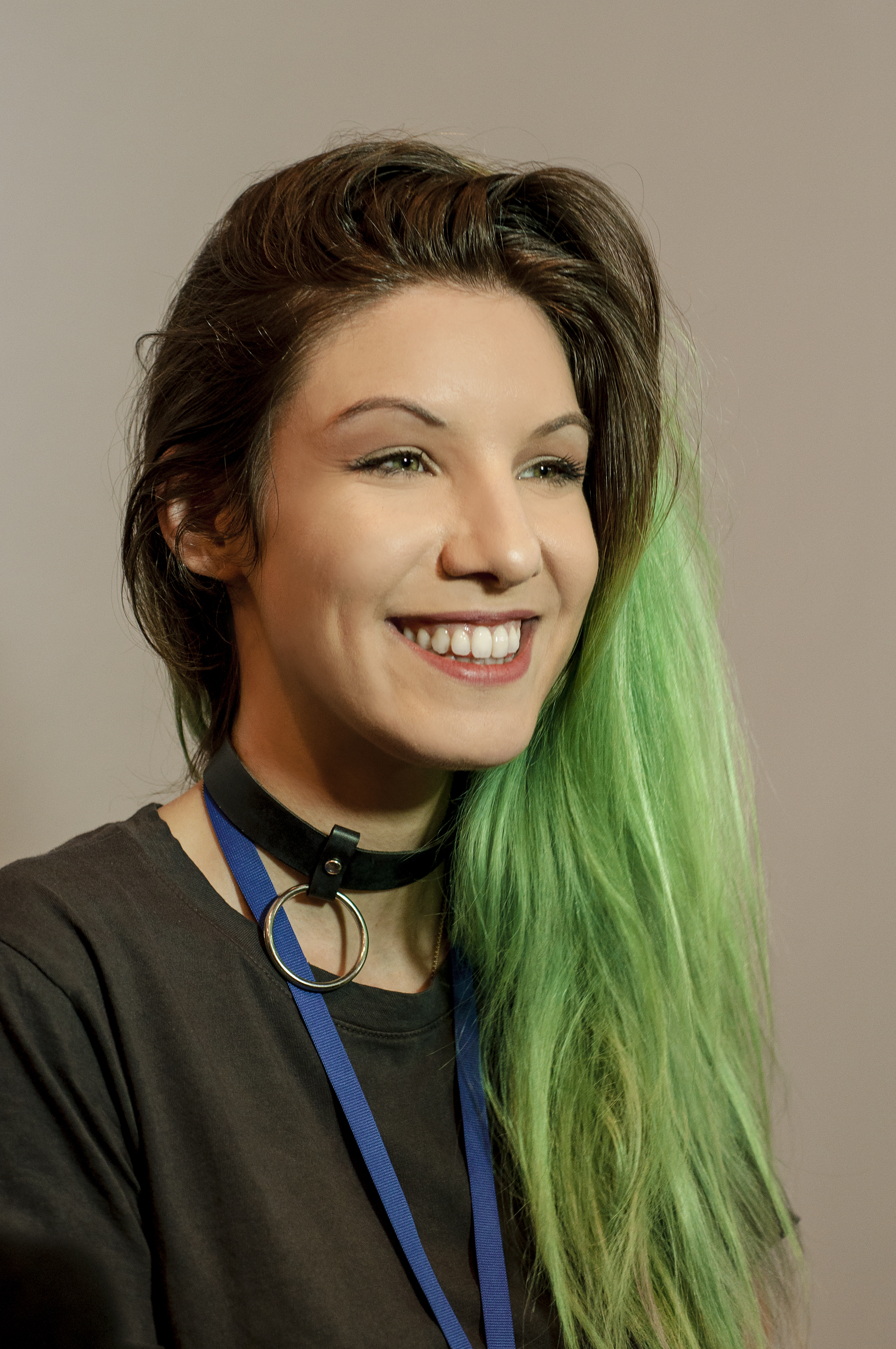
- MariMoon in 2015
- Born: Mariana de Souza Alves Lima; September 27, 1982 (age 44); São Paulo, São Paulo, Brazil
- Other name: MariMoon
- Citizenship: Brazilian
- Education: Faculdade Santa Marcelina; Mackenzie Presbyterian University
- Occupations: Television presenter Digital influencer
- Years active: 2008–present
- Website: marimoon.com.br

Mariana de Souza Alves Lima, better known as MariMoon (September 27, 1982), is a Brazilian TV host and internet personality. She is considered the first celebrity to emerge from the Brazilian internet, after her Fotolog blog became the most-followed in Brazil in 2003.

== Biography ==
Born in São Paulo, she is the granddaughter of journalist Cláudio de Souza, former editor at Editora Abril, and the niece of actor and screenwriter Flávio de Souza. Mariana is the oldest of five sisters. She enrolled in fashion programs at two institutions, Mackenzie Presbyterian University and Faculdade Santa Marcelina, but did not complete her studies at either.

In 2003, MariMoon created an online store to sell clothing, shoes, and accessories that she designed herself and sold at Japanese cultural events as well as at fashion fairs such as Mercado Mundo Mix. Before joining MTV, she worked as a web designer, window dresser, and costume designer, and launched her own clothing brand and online store.

Active online since she was a child, she rose to fame in 2003 when she began posting her selfies on one of the first photo-sharing social networks, Fotolog. There, she used the username MariMoon, which she created because “I’ve always been in class with about five girls named Mariana. I wanted a name that was just mine,” and as a tribute to the Japanese anime Sailor Moon. MariMoon gained widespread attention among internet users, earning her the status of Brazil's first internet celebrity. With her online success, she began receiving invitations to participate in advertising campaigns, magazine features, and television appearances. In 2006, she appeared on the cover of the teen magazine Capricho, when she was officially recognized as the first internet celebrity.

Starting on January 28, 2008, MariMoon became a host on MTV Brasil, debuting with her own show, Scrap MTV, where she shared tips on music, culture, movies, and the internet, and also conducted interviews. She won the Capricho Award for Most Stylish in Brazil twice: in 2009 and 2010. During her five years as a VJ, she hosted daily live shows. In 2010, she also began hosting the music and news program Acesso MTV, alongside fellow host, fashion designer, and reporter Titi Müller. That same year, he appeared on SBT's Um Contra Cem and won the 300,000 reais prize on March 3, 2010. She hosted two seasons of the teen reality show Colírios Capricho (2010 and 2011), conducted numerous interviews for Notícias MTV, and appeared at the annual MTV Video Music Brazil awards. MariMoon interviewed music stars such as Iggy Pop, Paramore, Metallica, and Evanescence. She left the channel in late 2012, shortly before Editora Abril returned the brand to Viacom, the parent company of MTV in the U.S.

As a film actress, she voiced Vanellope von Schweetz in Wreck-It Ralph and its sequel, Ralph Breaks the Internet, stating that appearing in a Disney movie was a dream come true. She also appeared as a regular cast member on the Disney Channel series Que Talento!. In 2013, she co-hosted the Meus Prêmios Nick awards show with actress Larissa Manoela and turned down an invitation to appear on the famous Brazilian reality show A Fazenda. In January 2014, she was invited by host Amaury Jr.. to join his show as a reporter, making her debut on May 7, 2014, on Programa Amaury Jr. on RedeTV!. Between 2017 and 2019, she has been covering music events for TV Globo, such as Lollapalooza and Rock in Rio.

Between 2023 and 2025, she co-hosted the podcast Acessíveis Cast with Titi Müller, a show that featured interviews and revisited the Acesso MTV duo.

== Filmography ==
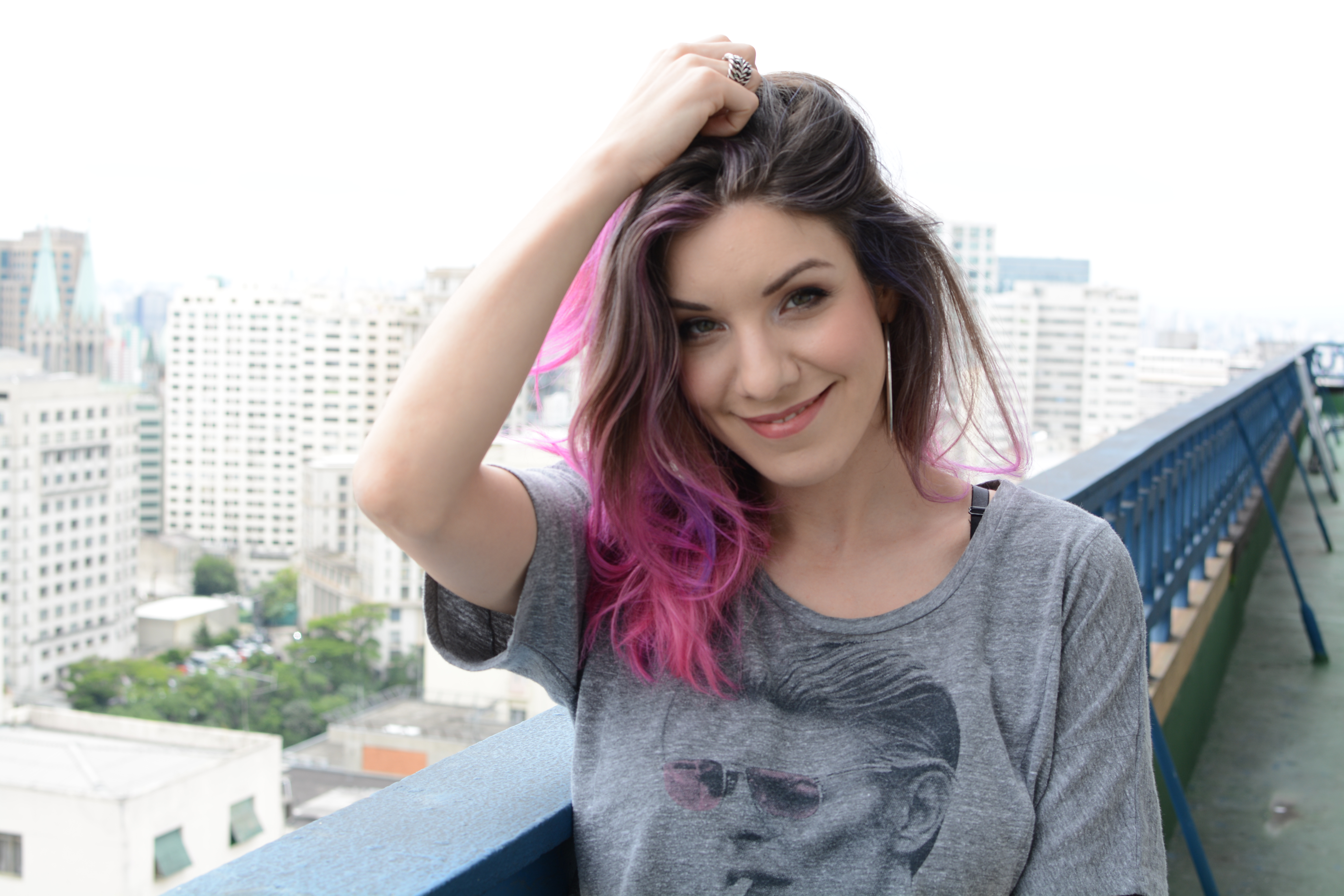
MariMoon in 2017.

=== Television ===
Year	Title	Position	Note(s)	Ref.
2008–10	Scrap MTV	Host		
2010	Comédia MTV	Herself	Episode: "28 de abril"	
2010–12	Acesso MTV	Host		
2010–11	Colírios Capricho MTV	Host		
2011	Furo MTV	Host	Episode: "14 de julho"	
2014	Programa Amaury Jr.	Reporter		
2015	MasterChef	Sworn	Episode: "15 de setembro"	
2016	Que Talento!	Herself	Episode: "16 de abril"	
2016	Dá o Play	Host		
2016–17	É de Casa	Columnist		
2017	Video Show	Reporter		
2017	São Paulo nas Alturas	Host		
2017	Rota 66	Host		
2018	Popstar	Sworn	Episode: "18 de novembro"	

=== Movies ===
Year	Title	Character	Note(s)	Ref.
2012	Wreck-It Ralph	Vanellope von Schweetz (voz)	Dubbing	
2018	Ralph Breaks the Internet	Vanellope von Schweetz (voz)	Dubbing	

=== Music video ===
Year	Artist	Music	Ref.
2007	Fake Number	Segredos que Guardei	

== Prizes ==
Year	Award	Category	Nominee(s)	Result	Ref.
2008	Prêmio Jovem Brasileiro	Presenter of the Year	Scrap MTV	Won	
2009	VMB	Twitter of the Year	@marimoon	Nominated	
2009	Capricho Awards	Best Dressed (National/International)	Herself	Won	
2010	Capricho Awards	Best Dressed (National/International)	Herself	Won	
2010	Prêmio Jovem Brasileiro	Best Young Presenter	Acesso MTV	Won	
2011	Meus Prêmios Nick	Craziest Hair	Acesso MTV	Nominated	
2012	Prêmio Jovem Brasileiro	Presenter	Acesso MTV	Won	
2012	Meus Prêmios Nick	TV Presenter	Acesso MTV	Nominated	
2012	Meus Prêmios Nick	Favorite Twitter Personality	@marimoon	Nominated	
2019	Meus Prêmios Nick	Epic Slime	MariMoon and Larissa Manoela (2013)	Nominated	

== Personal life ==
She dated actor Rafael Queiroga for three years; they broke up in 2013. In 2011, she was involved in a controversy with singer Jared Leto, lead singer of the band 30 Seconds to Mars, backstage at MTV Brasil, where he refused to give her an interview because the blogger had posted a comment on Twitter about a Brazilian fan whom the singer had allegedly insulted at a concert.

During an interview on Jovem Pan’s Pânico program in 2015, she revealed that she likes to date women. In an interview to VIP magazine in 2003, she said she was bisexual. She identifies as a feminist. She used to be a vegetarian, but for medical reasons she started eating meat again.
