= Sandy (Brazilian singer) =

Brazilian singer and actress

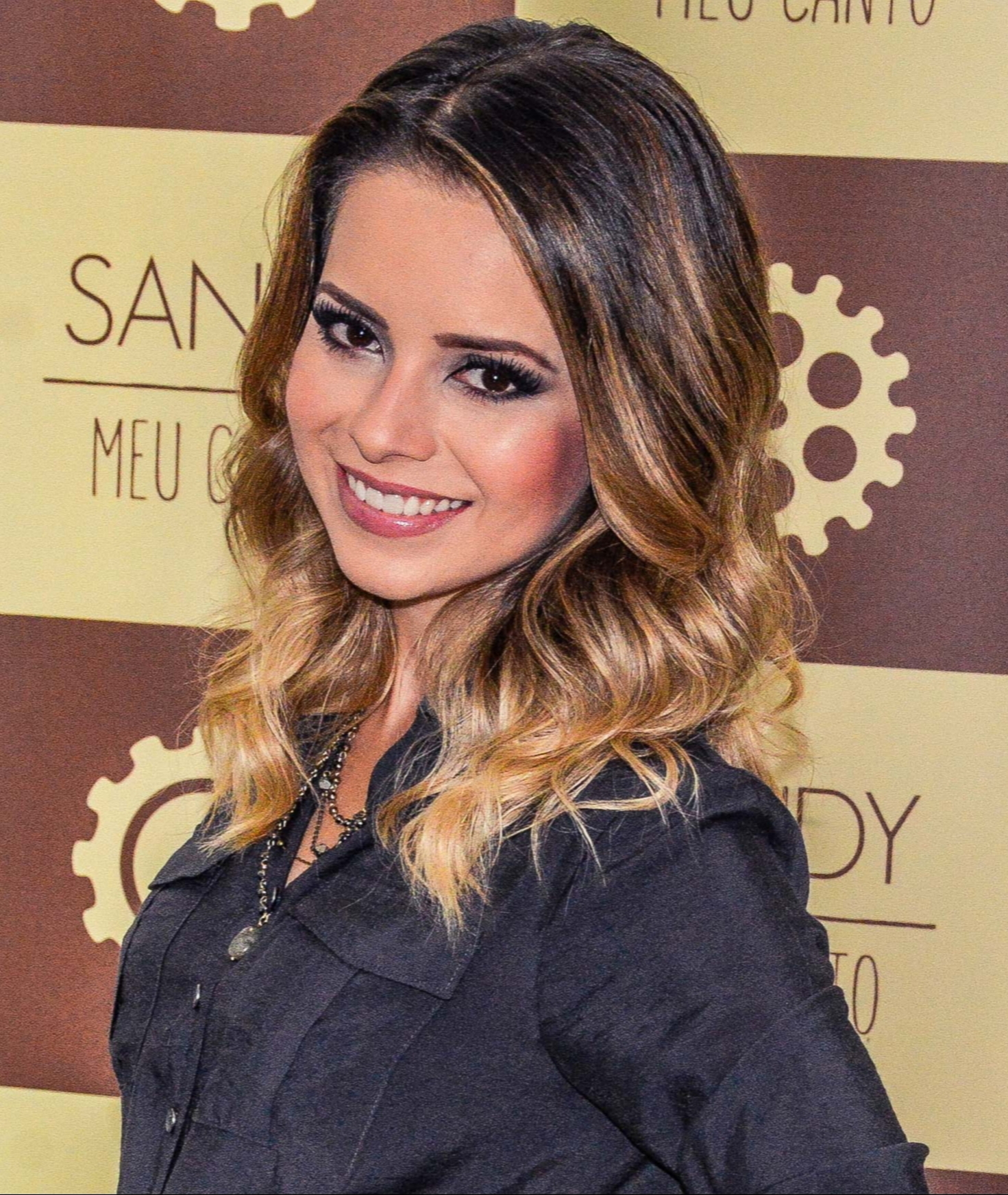
- Sandy in 2017
- Born: Sandy Leah Lima; 28 January 1983 (age 43); Campinas, São Paulo, Brazil
- Education: Pontifical Catholic University of Campinas
- Occupations: Singer-songwriter; actress
- Years active: 1989–present
- Spouse: Lucas Lima (m. 2008–2023)
- Children: 1
- Father: Xororó
- Relatives: Junior Lima (brother)
- Musical career
- Genres: Pop; folk; pop rock
- Instruments: Vocals; piano
- Label: UMG
- Formerly of: Sandy & Junior
- Website: Official website

Sandy Leah Lima (Portuguese pronunciation: [ˈsɐ̃dʒi ˈlɛa ˈlimɐ], born 28 January 1983), known mononymously as Sandy, is a Brazilian singer-songwriter and actress. Born and raised in Campinas, Sandy began her career in 1989, when she formed with her brother, musician Junior Lima, the vocal duo Sandy & Junior. They rose to fame in the early 1990s as child stars and reached the height of their success during teenage, as albums Era Uma Vez... Ao Vivo (1998), As Quatro Estações (1999), Quatro Estações: O Show (2000) and Sandy & Junior (2001) sold more than a million units, with the second and third being among the best-selling albums of all time in Brazil. The duo were credited with leading a wave of teen pop artists during the late 1990s and early 2000s, with the press labelling Sandy the Brazilian "Princess of Pop". The duo disbanded in 2007 and released their Acústico MTV in September that year. In addition to their success in the music industry, the sibling's name became a strong brand, with more than 300 licensed products which made R$300 million a year.

After the duo's disbandment in December 2007, Sandy spent the next two years concentrating efforts on producing her debut solo album. She also dedicated herself to her personal life. In 2008, Sandy married musician Lucas Lima and graduated from Pontifical Catholic University of Campinas with a degree in languages and literature. In 2010, she released her debut solo album, Manuscrito, which was preceded by lead single "Pés Cansados" and certified platinum by Pro-Música Brasil (PMB). Her first concert tour as a solo artist was recorded in August 2011 and gave rise to her first video/live album, Manuscrito Ao Vivo, released in November that year. Sandy's second studio album, Sim (2013) produced three singles and reached number nine in Brazil. In 2016, she released her second live album, Meu Canto, which was preceded by lead single "Me Espera" and reached the top of PMB's DVD chart. In 2018, she released her third studio album, a collaborations project titled Nós, Voz, Eles.

As an actress, she had leading roles in the television series Sandy & Junior (1999–2002) and As Brasileiras (2012), telenovela Estrela-Guia (2001), and films Acquária (2003) and Quando Eu Era Vivo (2014). Sandy has been featured as a judge on two seasons of the reality competition television series Superstar.

Throughout her career, Sandy sold over 20 million albums and has earned numerous awards and accolades, including six Multishow Brazilian Music Award, three Melhores do Ano (Rede Globo awards), and one Latin Grammy Award nomination. She was considered one of the 100 most influential Brazilian personalities of 2013 by the Brazilian edition of Forbes magazine.

== Early life ==
Sandy was born to Noely Pereira and singer Durval de Lima, better known for his stage name, Xororó. Her first name was inspired by Olivia Newton-John's character in the film Grease. Her parents started dating the day they watched the movie. She has one younger brother, Junior Lima (born Durval de Lima Junior in April 1984). Sandy and Junior started singing and playing musical instruments at an early age.

== Career ==
=== 1990–2007: Sandy & Junior ===
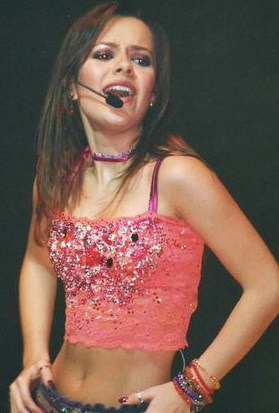
Sandy during a live performance in 2001.

Sandy & Junior performed as a duo for the first time in 1989 in Brazil. In 1990 they recorded their first album, Aniversário do Tatu, which sold 300,000 copies in Brazil. They first gained notoriety by being the children of Xororó from popular sertanejo duo Chitãozinho & Xororó. Sandy & Junior began by singing children's songs and sertanejo/country-influenced tracks (their first single, "Maria Chiquinha", is a classic sertanejo song). Once they reached adolescence, they changed their style to pop-influenced songs, mainly ballads and upbeat songs. They became a pop phenomenon in Brazil with the release of the albums Era Uma Vez - Ao Vivo (1998), As Quatro Estações (1999), Quatro Estações - O Show (2000) and Sandy & Junior (2001), which sold more than 9 million copies together, receiving multiple diamond certificates. Época magazine compared their success to Beatlemania.

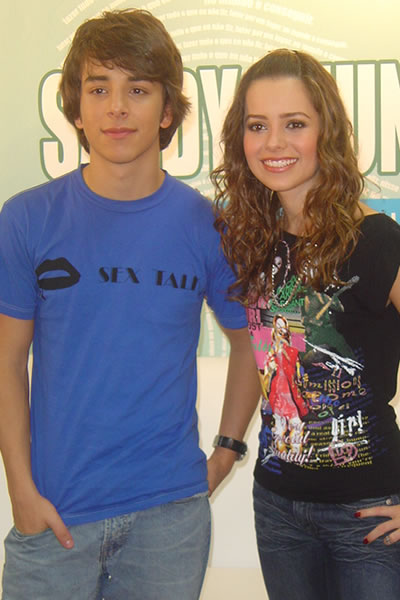
Sandy and Junior in 2004.

Aiming for an international career, they released the album Internacional (titled Sandy & Junior in Europe and Latin America) in 2002. To promote the album, they traveled to countries such as Germany, Portugal, Italy, Mexico, Chile, Puerto Rico and Spain. Billboard magazine praised the album, stating that "Everything is pleasant, beautifully done, and totally mainstream. [...] The strength here, though, is Sandy's sweet, bell-like voice—one that shows surprising range and strength belied by its dulcimer quality." The album sold 1.2 million copies worldwide and was preceded by its lead single "Love Never Fails" (also recorded in Portuguese, Spanish and French language.) The album Sandy & Junior (2006) was nominated for a Latin Grammy in the category Best Contemporary Pop Album. On April 17, 2007, Sandy & Junior announced that an MTV Unplugged album to be recorded in May 2007 would be their final work together, through a video posted on their website addressed to their fans and in a press conference, stating also that their career as a duo would be over at the end of 2007. Their MTV Unplugged (in Portuguese Acústico MTV) was certified triple platinum in Brazil.

They also had a self-titled weekly television series between 1999 and 2002 on Rede Globo and released the movie Acquaria in 2003; Sandy also starred in the soap opera Estrela-Guia (Globo) in 2001. Earlier, they had appeared in Renato Aragão movie O Noviço Rebelde, in 1997. As a duo, Sandy and Junior released 12 studio albums and four live albums, selling over 20 million albums worldwide. Of the important moments in their career, several stand out: a show in João Pessoa (2001) to over 1.2 million people, Rock in Rio III, and a concert in Maracanã Stadium (which gave rise to a CD and DVD).

Sandy's first solo recording was a feature on Andrea Bocelli's "Vivo Por Ella" that was released in 1997, peaking at number one on the Brazilian Hot 100 chart. In 2000, Sandy featured in Enrique Iglesias song "You're My #1". She twice won the Multishow Award for Best singer, and on several occasions she won the Meus Prêmios Nick in the category of Best singer. When she was 13 years old, she participated in a special tribute to the singer Elis Regina at Som Brasil, broadcast by Rede Globo. After this presentation, Sandy partnered with Gilberto Gil, Milton Nascimento, Caetano Veloso, among other renowned singers and musicians of Brazilian popular music. Sandy's voice was also praised by singer Mariah Carey, whom she meet in December 2002.

=== 2008–2011: Manuscrito ===
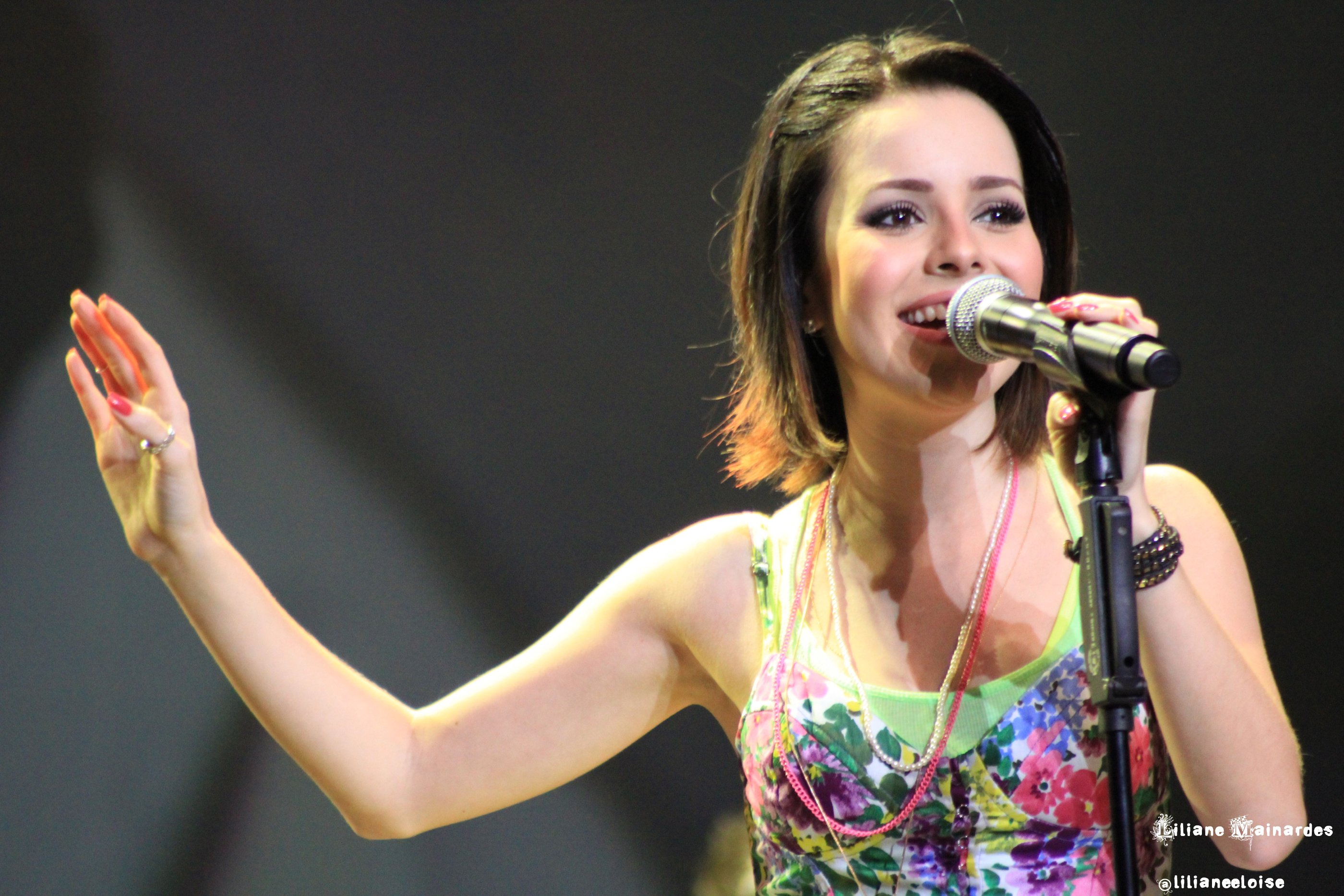
Sandy during a live performance at Teatro Positivo (Curitiba, November 2010).

In November 2008, Sandy, alongside Paula Toller opened the 9th Annual Latin Grammy Awards, paying tribute to Carmen Miranda. In May 2009, Sandy, alongside electronic duo Crossover, peaked at number 13 in the Canada's dance chart with the single "Scandal". In 2009, she started working on solo material, and her debut album, Manuscrito, was released in Brazil on 7 May 2010. She wrote two songs alone and co-wrote the remaining eleven with Lucas Lima and Junior Lima. The album received positive reviews from music critics and peaked at number 4 on the Brazilian Albums Chart. Manuscrito was certified platinum by the Pro-Música Brasil (PMB). Manuscrito was released in Portugal on September 20, 2010. One of the album's tracks ("Dias Iguais") features British singer-songwriter Nerina Pallot. Its lead single, "Pés Cansados" became one of the most played tracks in Brazilian radio stations in 2010. "Quem Eu Sou" was released as a second single but failed to match "Pés Cansados" success. "Pés Cansados" was later nominated for two MTV Video Music Brazil (Best Pop Video and Hit of The Year). At the 2011 Multishow Brazilian Music Award, Sandy received two nominations. In November 2010, Sandy supported the album through the Manuscrito Tour; with 24 dates, it ended in December 2012. She later released her first live album/DVD Manuscrito Ao Vivo (2011), featuring singers Lenine, Seu Jorge and Nerina Pallot.

The setlist of her Sandy Canta Michael Jackson tour was fully made of Michael Jackson songs, which she described as an idol an inspiration. The tour was part of the Banco do Brasil's sponsored project Circuito Cultural; It had 10 sold-out concerts and received positive reviews from music critics.

=== 2012–2014: Sim and acting ===
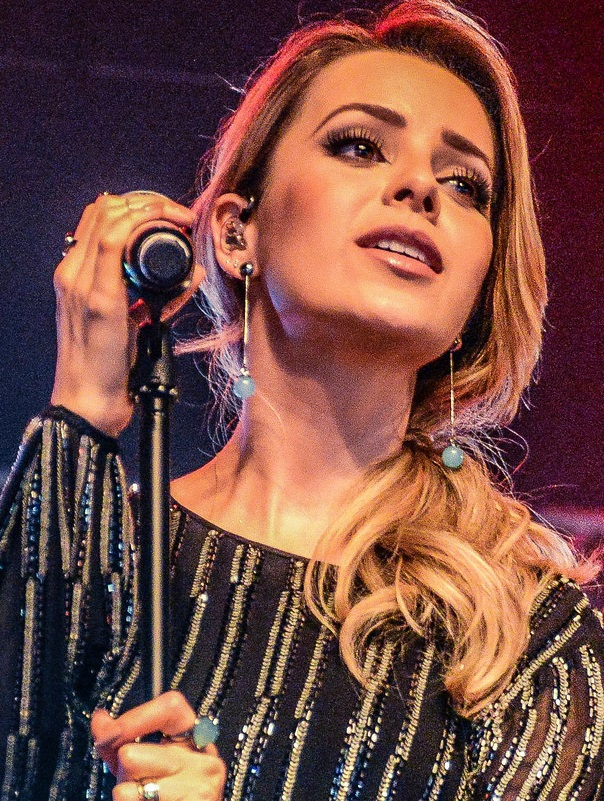
Sandy during her Meu Canto tour in São Paulo, May 2016.

Sandy's second studio album, Sim, was released on June 11, 2013. She wrote one song alone and co-wrote the remaining nine with Lucas Lima. It peaked at number 9 on the Brazilian Albums Chart and spawned the singles "Aquela dos 30", "Escolho Você" and "Morada". It received positive reviews from music critics. In April 2013, Sandy supported the album through the Sim Tour; with 17 dates, it ended in May 2014.

She starred an episode of the Brazilian series As Brasileiras, which aired in April 2012. In 2013, she appeared as herself in the comedy film Mato Sem Cachorro. In February 2013, Sandy featured in Andrea Bocelli's film Love In Portofino, dueting the song "Corcovado" with him. In January 2014, Sandy starred alongside Antônio Fagundes and Marat Descartes in the film Quando Eu Era Vivo. It received positive reviews from critics. In her acting career, she is credited as Sandy Leah. Sandy featured in David Bisbal song "Hombre de Tu Vida", from his fifth studio album, Tu Y Yo (2014). In June 2014, Sandy gave birth to her first child, a son named Theo Scholles Lima.

=== 2015–2017: Superstar and Meu Canto ===
In April 2015, Sandy was hired to replace Ivete Sangalo as a judge for the second season of the Brazilian version (Superstar) of reality television singing competition Rising Star, joining Thiaguinho and Paulo Ricardo. She returned as judge on Superstar for its third and final series.

Sandy's second live album/DVD, Meu Canto was released in June 2016; the DVD peaked at number one on the Brazilian DVD Charts, while the album peaked at number two on the Albums Chart. The album includes five new tracks; these songs were also recorded in studio version. "Me Espera", a duet with Tiago Iorc, was released as its lead single and became a major hit in Brazil. "Respirar" was released as a second single. In May 2016, Sandy supported the album through the Meu Canto Tour; with 49 dates, it ended in December 2017.

In 2017, Sandy featured in Luan Santana song "Mesmo Sem Estar", which peaked at number 4 on the Billboard Brazil Hot 100 Airplay.

=== 2018–present: Nós, Voz, Eles and Sandy & Junior reunion tour ===
In early 2018, Sandy began working on her third studio album. In February, she was featured on the song "Black Widow's Web" by progressive metal band Angra. In November 2018, she released her third studio album, titled Nós, Voz, Eles. In March 2019, Sandy and her brother Junior Lima announced the Nossa História tour in celebration of the 30th anniversary of the duo's first televised performance, which took place in 1989. With several dates in stadiums, the tour had several extra dates to accommodate more fans.

== Artistry ==
While her work in the duo Sandy & Junior were generally derived from genres such as sertanejo (early albums), country, pop, teen pop, dance-pop and pop rock, Sandy's solo projects frequently blends elements of pop, folk, pop rock and soft rock. Multiple reviewers also note the influences of British pop/rock, MPB and jazz on Sandy's releases. Music critics compares Sandy's music to that of Sara Bareilles, Regina Spektor and Mallu Magalhães. She called her music "alternative pop with hints of folk music."

While she almost exclusively releases Portuguese songs, Sandy recorded some English and Spanish songs. Sandy is a soprano, having a vocal range spanning 3.3 octaves (from E3 to A6). She names Elis Regina as her major musical influence. Her other musical influences include John Mayer, Coldplay, Norah Jones, Damien Rice, Sarah McLachlan and jazz singer Ella Fitzgerald. Her early influences includes Mariah Carey, Céline Dion, Whitney Houston and also her father, sertanejo singer Xororó.

== Other activities ==
Sandy is a philanthropist who has been involved with more than 50 charitable organizations. In 2004, she was awarded with the Trabalho Solidário award for her philanthropy work.

Between the 1990s and 2000s, more than 300 products (including cosmetics, clothing and toys) were licensed under the Sandy and Sandy & Junior brands. These brands were valued at R$60 million, according to Exame magazine. According to IstoÉ magazine, the brands moved up to R$300 million annually. In March 2011, Sandy replaced Paris Hilton in the advertisements of Devassa beer, which caused some controversy in Brazil at the time, mostly due to the company's name (translated as 'libertine', or 'promiscuous') not matching Sandy's public image. She received US$1 million to star in the advertising campaign. In 2016, Sandy launched her own line of nail polishes and lipsticks in partnership with Impala Cosmetics.

== Personal life ==
In 1999, Sandy dated her Sandy & Junior co-star, actor Paulo Vilhena. The two broke up months later due to Sandy's busy schedule at the time but have remained in good terms.

Sandy had previously dated musician Lucas Scholles Lima for five months in 1999; they resumed their relationship in 2004, announced their engagement in 2007, and were married on September 12, 2008. They have one son, Theo Scholles Lima (born June 24, 2014), and separated in 2023.

Sandy graduated from Pontifical Catholic University of Campinas with a degree in languages and literature, Portuguese and English, in 2008. Sandy does not follow any religion, stating that "I do not consider myself of any religion [...] but I have enough faith, faith in God. I have my [own] religion, linked to spirituality." She also described herself as an "introspective person". Sandy shares "feminist ideals" and also supports same-sex marriage and LGBT rights.

== Discography ==
Year	Album	Sales in Brazil	Certifications
2010	Manuscrito	150.000	Platinum
2011	Manuscrito Ao Vivo	80.000	Platinum
2013	Sim	40.000	—N/a
2016	Meu Canto	45.000	Gold
2018	Nós, Voz, Eles	3.000	—N/a

== Videography ==
Year	Album	Sales in Brazil	Certifications
2011	Manuscrito Ao Vivo	50.000	Platinum
2016	Meu Canto	23.000	—N/a
2018	Nós, Voz, Eles	4.000	—N/a

== Filmography ==
- O Noviço Rebelde (1997) ...as Márcia
- AcQuária (2003) ...as Sarah
- Estranho Jeito de Amar (2006) ...as Luiza
- Mato Sem Cachorro (2013) ...as herself
- Quando Eu Era Vivo (2014) ...as Bruna
- Sing (2016) ...as Meena (Brazilian version)
- Sandy + Chef (2021)

=== Documentaries ===
- Tempo (included in the special edition of Manuscrito)

== Tours ==
As a solo artist

- 2007: Sandy
- 2010—11: Manuscrito
- 2012: Sandy Canta Michael Jackson
- 2013—14: Sim
- 2015: Teaser
- 2016—17: Meu Canto
- 2018—19: Nós, Voz, Eles
- 2022—23: Nós, Voz, Eles Vol. 2
- 2024: Turnê 2024
