= Superstar (Brazilian TV series) season 3 =

Superstar
- Season 3
- Hosted by: Fernanda Lima; Rafa Brites
- Judges: Daniela Mercury; Paulo Ricardo; Sandy
- Winner: Fulô de Mandacaru
- Runner-up: Plutão Já Foi Planeta

Release
- Original network: Rede Globo
- Original release: April 10 – June 26, 2016

Season chronology
- ← Previous; Season 2

The third season of SuperStar, premiered live on Rede Globo on Sunday, April 10, 2016 at 1 p.m. (BRT/AMT) during the 2016–17 Brazilian television season. The winning band is entitled to a R$500,000 prize, and a recording contract with Som Livre.

== Host and experts ==
The experts of SuperStar

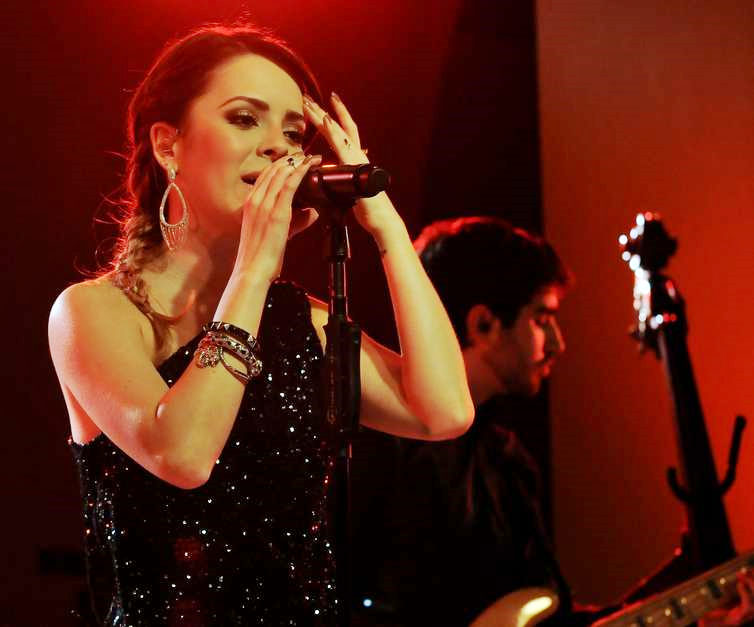
Sandy

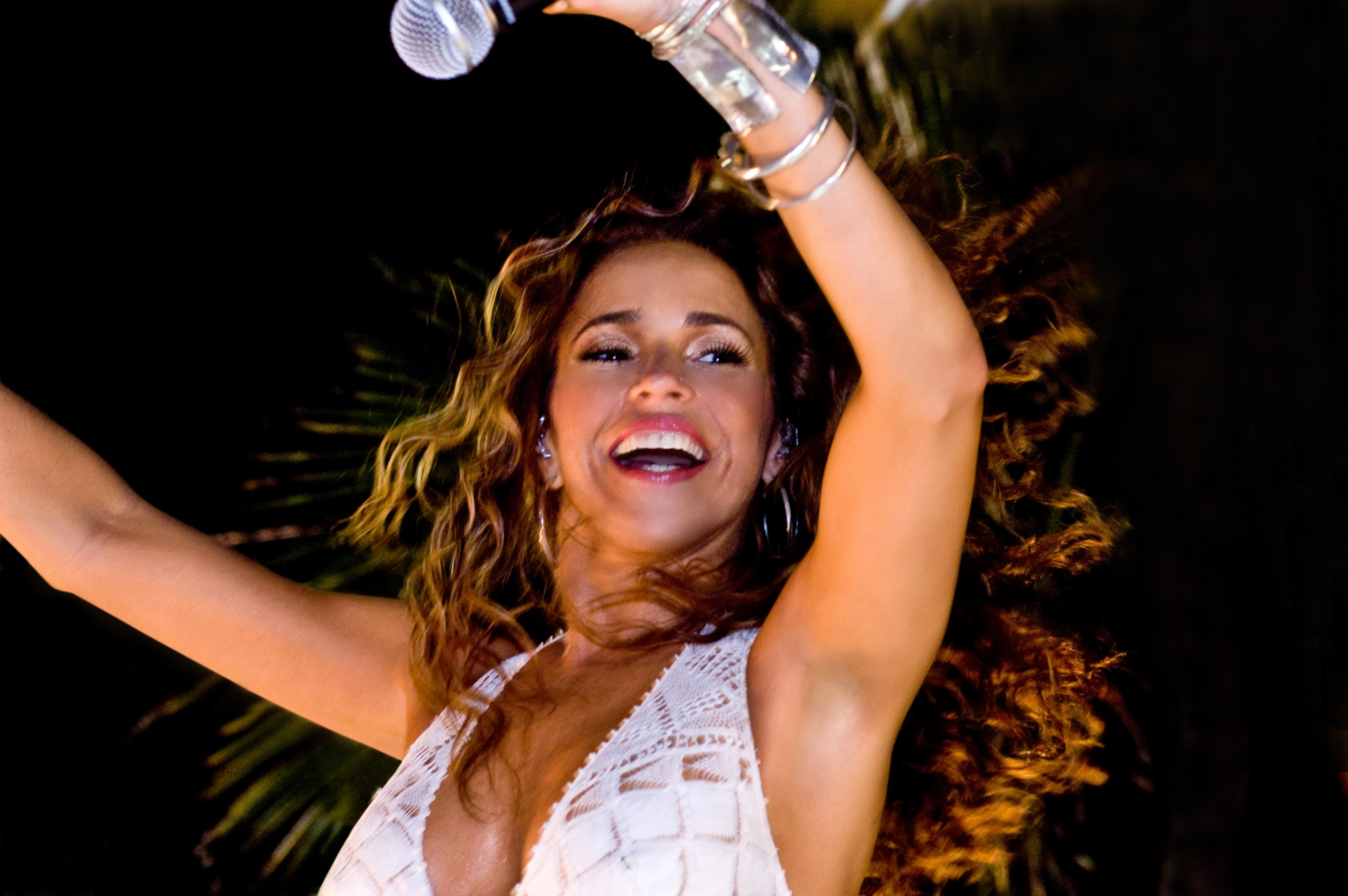
Daniela Mercury

=== Hosts ===
Fernanda Lima returned as the host, and Rafa Brites as backstage interviewer.

=== Experts ===
Two experts (Paulo Ricardo and Sandy) returned for their second season, and Thiaguinho was replaced by Daniela Mercury.

== The auditions ==
Key
– Expert vote "Yes"
– Expert vote "No"
– Band reached + 70%, finished in the top 4 and advanced to the Playoffs
– Band reached + 70%, finished out the top 4 and was sent to Wild Card
– Band eliminated

=== Week 1 ===
Aired: April 10, 2016

Running order

Band	Song	Public vote	Experts' vote			Total vote	Rank night
Band	Song	Public vote	Sandy	Daniela	Paulo	Total vote	Rank night
Fulô de Mandacaru	"É Proibido Cochilar / Chilique"	56%				70%	8th
Katarinas	"Não Para / Hoje / Eu Sou a Diva Que Você Quer Copiar / Vou Desafiar Você / Amor de Chocolate / País do Futebol / Beija ou Não Beija"	63%				77%	4th
Preto Massa	"Fumaça"	53%				74%	5th
Os de Paula	"Que Mina é Essa"	60%				74%	5th
161	"Quando a Chuva Passar"	58%				79%	3rd
Alphazimu	"Beleza Pura"	53%				74%	5th
Supertoy	"Blecaute"	55%				62%	9th
Turne	"Me Esqueça"	68%				89%	1st
GrooVI	"Still in Love"	61%				82%	2nd

=== Week 2 ===
Aired: April 17, 2016

Running order

Band	Song	Public vote	Experts' vote			Total vote	Rank night
Band	Song	Public vote	Sandy	Daniela	Paulo	Total vote	Rank night
Pagan John	"Sina"	63%				84%	2nd
A Quebrada	"Preta"	55%				76%	8th
Tróia	"Você Mudou"	61%				82%	3rd
Bella Xu	"Incondicional"	57%				78%	6th
Izzy Gordon	"Sabiá / Você / Let's Get It Started"	59.04%				80.04%	5th
Tereza	"Pra Onde a Gente Vai"	47%				54%	10th
Kanoa	"Cê Que Sabe"	63%				77%	7th
Mil Verões	"I Love You Baby"	60%				67%	9th
Plutão Já Foi Planeta	"Viagem Perdida"	69%				90%	1st
Georgia	"Valerie / Réu Confesso"	66.25%				80.25%	4th

=== Week 3 ===
Aired: April 24, 2016

Running order

Band	Song	Public vote	Experts' vote			Total vote	Rank night
Band	Song	Public vote	Sandy	Daniela	Paulo	Total vote	Rank night
Diannah	"Poeira da Lua"	45%				59%	8th
Negra Cor	"Nossa Gente (Avisa Lá)/ Wiggle / Que Bloco É Esse"	62%				83%	4th
Rockscola	"Inútil"	63%				77%	6th
2 Reis	"Repartir"	57%				78%	5th
Playmobille	"Linda Rosa"	65%				86%	3rd
Mato Seco	"Pedras Pesadas"	53%				74%	7th
OutroEu	"Coisa de Casa"	72%				93%	1st
Bellamore	"Come Together"	66%				87%	2nd

=== Week 4 ===
Aired: May 1, 2016

Running order

Band	Song	Public vote	Experts' vote			Total vote	Rank night
Band	Song	Public vote	Sandy	Daniela	Paulo	Total vote	Rank night
Bella N' Jokers	"A Noite"	46%				60%	7th
PowerTrip	"Ando Meio Desligado / Money for Nothing / Psycho Killer"	59%				73%	6th
Luso Baião	"Leão do Norte"	56.06%				77.06%	5th
Gringo's Washboard Band	"1 x 0 (Um a Zero)"	56.09%				77.09%	4th
Melim	"Como É Grande o Meu Amor por Você / Super Duper Love"	72%				93%	1st
Efeito Manada	"A Praieira"	45%				59%	8th
Samba de Donanna	"Sinais de Fogo"	65%				86%	3rd
Valente	"Sem Toda Minha Alegria"	67%				88%	2nd

=== Week 5: Wildcard ===
Aired: May 8, 2016

Running order

Band	Song	Public vote	Experts' vote			Total vote	Rank night
Band	Song	Public vote	Sandy	Daniela	Paulo	Total vote	Rank night
2 Reis	"Família"	49%				70%	6th
Kanoa	"Anjo"	42%				49%	13th
Rockscola	"Breed / Aluga-se"	56%				70%	6th
Fulô de Mandacaru	"Asa Branca / Baião"	59%				80%	1st
Preto Massa	"Imunização Racional (Que Beleza)"	58%				79%	2nd
Mato Seco	"No Woman, No Cry / Não Chores Mais"	53%				67%	10th
A Quebrada	"Raiou"	51%				72%	5th
Izzy Gordon	"Rock Steady"	39%				60%	12th
Os de Paula	"A Gente Pode Namorar"	48%				69%	9th
PowerTrip	"We Will Rock You"	56%				77%	4th
Bella Xu	"Pra Sempre"	56%				70%	6th
Luso Baião	"Lamento Sertanejo"	55%				62%	11th
Alphazimu	"Tempos Modernos / Adventure of a Lifetime"	58%				79%	2nd

== Playoffs ==
=== Week 6 ===
Aired: May 15, 2016

Key
- Band advanced
- Band eliminated

Running order

Band	Song	Public vote	Experts' vote			Total vote	Rank night
Band	Song	Public vote	Sandy	Daniela	Paulo	Total vote	Rank night
Negra Cor	"Toda Menina Baiana / Sorry"	50%				71%	7th
Georgia	"Proud Mary"	56%				77%	3rd
Samba de Donanna	"Não Me Deixe Só / Qual é?"	53%				67%	8th
Plutão Já Foi Planeta	"Você Não É Mais Planeta"	54%				75%	5th
Melim	"Anunciação / Put Your Records On"	64%				85%	1st
Bellamore	"Teu Talento"	55%				76%	4th
OutroEu	"Budapest"	63%				84%	2nd
Tróia	"Chuva de Arroz"	54%				61%	9th
Turne	"No Meu Lugar / Best of You"	44%				58%	10th
PowerTrip	"Another Brick in the Wall / The Happiest Days of Our Lives"	52%				73%	6th

=== Week 7 ===
Aired: May 22, 2016

Running order

Band	Song	Public vote	Experts' vote			Total vote	Rank night
Band	Song	Public vote	Sandy	Daniela	Paulo	Total vote	Rank night
Playmobille	"Jorge Maravilha"	56%				77%	3rd
Alphazimu	"Ai, Ai, Ai / Get Lucky"	45%				66%	8th
161	"Taj Mahal / Fio Maravilha"	46%				60%	9th
Pagan John	"Carta"	60%				81%	1st
Fulô de Mandacaru	"De Volta pro Aconchego / Frevo Mulher / Forró No Escuro"	58%				72%	4th
Valente	"Sozinho"	54%				68%	6th
Katarinas	"Hello"	53%				67%	7th
GrooVI	"Let's Stay Together"	40%				47%	10th
Gringo's Washboard Band	"Joshua Fit the Battle of Jericho"	50%				71%	5th
Preto Massa	"Chinelo de Dedo"	58%				79%	2nd

== The solos ==
=== Elimination chart ===
Band	Week 8	Week 9	Week 10	Week 11	Week 12		
Band	Week 8	Week 9	Week 10	Week 11	Top 4	Top 3	Top 2
Fulô de Mandacaru	9th 72%	2nd 79%	3rd 74%	1st 69%	1st 67%	1st 66%	1st 70%
Plutão Já Foi Planeta	2nd 77%	3rd 77%	2nd 76%	3rd 61%	2nd 65%	2nd 62%	2nd 48%
OutroEu	8th 73%	4th 75%	3rd 74%	2nd 63%	3rd 54%	3rd 52%	Eliminated (Week 12)
Bellamore	1st 79%	8th 63%	5th 70%	4th 58%	4th 52%	Eliminated (Week 12)	
Valente	6th 74%	4th 75%	6th 69%	5th 57%	Eliminated (Week 11)		
Playmobille	5th 75%	7th 64%	1st 78%	6th 45%	Eliminated (Week 11)		
Melim	6th 74%	6th 72%	7th 67%	7th 44%	Eliminated (Week 11)		
Powertrip	3rd 76%	9th 61%	8th 66%	8th 40%	Eliminated (Week 11)		
Pagan John	9th 72%	1st 84%	9th 65%	Eliminated (Week 10)			
Negra Cor	10th 68%	9th 61%	10th 58%	Eliminated (Week 10)			
Georgia	3rd 76%	11th 59%	Eliminated (Week 9)				
Preto Massa	10th 68%	12th 58%	Eliminated (Week 9)				
Gringo's Washboard Band	13th 67%	Eliminated (Week 8)					
Alphazimu	14th 62%	Eliminated (Week 8)					
Samba de Donanna	15th 54%	Eliminated (Week 8)					
Katarinas	16th 51%	Eliminated (Week 8)					

=== Week 8 ===
Aired: May 29, 2016

Top 16 Perform

Band	Song	Public vote	Experts' vote			Total vote	Rank night
Band	Song	Public vote	Sandy	Daniela	Paulo	Total vote	Rank night
Preto Massa	"Vem Quente Que Eu Estou Fervendo"	47%				68%	10th
Fulô de Mandacaru	"No Dia Em Que Eu Saí de Casa / O Canto da Ema / Oia Eu Aqui De Novo"	51%				72%	9th
Negra Cor	"Sossego / Uptown Funk"	47%				68%	10th
PowerTrip	"(I Can't Get No) Satisfaction"	55%				76%	3rd
Katarinas	"Suíte 14"	37%				51%	16th
Melim	"Avião de Papel"	53%				74%	6th
Gringo's Washboard Band	"Negro Gato / Sweet Home Chicago"	46%				67%	13th
Alphazimu	"Nos Barracos da Cidade"	41%				62%	14th
Plutão Já Foi Planeta	"Mesa 16"	56%				77%	2nd
Samba de Donanna	"Aviso Aos Navegantes / Loving Every Minute"	40%				54%	15th
OutroEu	"Dona Cila"	52%				73%	8th
Valente	"Insossego"	53%				74%	6th
Playmobille	"Dama de Áries"	54%				75%	5th
Bellamore	"Love Me Again"	58%				79%	1st
Pagan John	"Inesperado"	58%				72%	9th
Georgia	"(You Make Me Feel Like) A Natural Woman"	62%				76%	3rd

=== Week 9 ===
Aired: June 5, 2016

Top 12 Perform

Band	Song	Public vote	Experts' vote			Total vote	Rank night
Band	Song	Public vote	Sandy	Daniela	Paulo	Total vote	Rank night
Georgia	"Tell Me 'bout It"	38%				59%	11th
Negra Cor	"Não Vou Ficar / Elétrico Terreiro"	40%				61%	9th
Preto Massa	"Tua Ausência"	37%				58%	12th
Melim	"Um Anjo do Céu / Isn't She Lovely"	51%				72%	6th
Fulô de Mandacaru	"Eu Só Quero Um Xodó"	58%				79%	2nd
OutroEu	"Zade"	54%				75%	4th
Plutão Já Foi Planeta	"Educação Sentimental"	56%				77%	3rd
Bellamore	"Seu"	49%				63%	8th
Playmobille	"A Próxima Vez"	43%				64%	7th
PowerTrip	"With a Little Help from My Friends"	47%				61%	9th
Valente	"Meu Andar"	54%				75%	4th
Pagan John	"Maria, Maria"	63%				84%	1st

=== Week 10 ===
Aired: June 12, 2016

Top 10 Perform

Band	Song	Public vote	Experts' vote			Guests vote	Total vote	Rank night
Band	Song	Public vote	Sandy	Daniela	Paulo	Guests vote	Total vote	Rank night
PowerTrip	"Metamorfose Ambulante"	39%				6%	66%	8th
Melim	"Peça Felicidade"	43%				3%	67%	7th
Bellamore	"Radioactive"	49%				—	70%	5th
Pagan John	"Meu Cais"	44%				—	65%	9th
Negra Cor	"Não Vá Embora / Beija-Flor"	37%				—	58%	10th
Fulô de Mandacaru	"Fulô de Mandacaru Chegou"	53%				—	74%	3rd
Valente	"Se Eu Não Te Amasse Tanto Assim"	48%				—	69%	6th
Plutão Já Foi Planeta	"Me Leve"	55%				—	76%	2nd
OutroEu	"O Que Dizer de Você?"	53%				—	74%	3rd
Playmobille	"Boys Don't Cry / Pense em Mim"	57%				—	78%	1st

=== Week 11 ===
Aired: June 19, 2016

Top 8 - Semifinal

Band	Song	Public vote	Experts' vote			Total vote	Rank night
Band	Song	Public vote	Sandy	Daniela	Paulo	Total vote	Rank night
Melim	"Balada do Amor Inabalável / Garota de Ipanema / The Girl from Ipanema"	44%	—	—	—	44%	7th
Valente	"Teu Ser"	50%	—	—		50%	5th
Playmobille	"Tua Ausência"	45%	—	—	—	45%	6th
PowerTrip	"Run To My Soul - Sonhos"	40%	—	—	—	40%	8th
Bellamore	"With Or Without You"	58%	—	—	—	58%	4th
OutroEu	"O Que Te Faz Feliz?"	49%			—	63%	2nd
Plutão Já Foi Planeta	"O Ficar e o Ir da Gente"	61%	—	—	—	61%	3rd
Fulô de Mandacaru	"A Vida do Viajante"	69%	—	—	—	69%	1st

=== Week 12 ===
Finale

Aired: June 26, 2016

Running order

Band	Song	Public vote	Experts' vote			Total vote	Final rank
Band	Song	Public vote	Sandy	Daniela	Paulo	Total vote	Final rank
First Round
Bellamore	"Counting Stars"	31%				52%	4th
Fulô de Mandacaru	"O Trenzinho do Caipira / Luar do Sertão / Olha Pro Céu"	53%				67%	1st
OutroEu	"Hold Back the River"	33%				54%	3rd
Plutão Já Foi Planeta	"Quase sem Querer"	44%				65%	2nd
Second Round
OutroEu	"Pai"	31%				52%	3rd
Plutão Já Foi Planeta	"Alto Mar"	41%				62%	2nd
Fulô de Mandacaru	"Só o Mie"	52%				66%	1st
Third Round
Plutão Já Foi Planeta	"Post-It"	48%	No experts' vote; public votes alone and decides who wins SuperStar.			48%	2nd
Fulô de Mandacaru	"São João de Outrora"	70%	No experts' vote; public votes alone and decides who wins SuperStar.			70%	SuperStar

== Ratings and reception ==
=== Brazilian ratings ===
All numbers are in points and provided by IBOPE.

Week	Episode	Air Date	Timeslot (BRT)	Viewers (in points)	Rank Timeslot	Source
1	Auditions 1	April 10, 2016	Sunday 1:00 p.m.	10.5	1	
2	Auditions 2	April 17, 2016	Sunday 1:00 p.m.	12.5	1	
3	Auditions 3	April 24, 2016	Sunday 1:00 p.m.	9.7	1	
4	Auditions 4	May 1, 2016	Sunday 1:00 p.m.	10.5	1	
5	Wildcard	May 8, 2016	Sunday 1:00 p.m.	9.7	1	
6	Playoffs 1	May 15, 2016	Sunday 1:00 p.m.	10.9	1	
7	Playoffs 2	May 22, 2016	Sunday 1:00 p.m.	9.5	1	
8	Top 16	May 29, 2016	Sunday 1:00 p.m.	10.1	1	
9	Top 12	June 5, 2016	Sunday 1:00 p.m.	11.8	1	
10	Top 10	June 12, 2016	Sunday 1:00 p.m.	10	1	
11	Top 8	June 19, 2016	Sunday 1:00 p.m.	10.4	1	
12	Season Finale	June 26, 2016	Sunday 1:00 p.m.	9.5	1	

- In 2016, each point represents 69,417 households in São Paulo.
