= List of programs broadcast by MTV Brasil =

Last MTV Brasil logo, used until September 30, 2013

MTV Brasil programming is largely targeted to teenagers and young adults, based mostly on comedy and music shows, but also deals with fashion, health, politics and the environment.

The music videos and live shows aired on MTV Brasil focus on the international rock and pop scenes and on Brazilian pop rock and independent rock bands.

== Former programs ==
=== Music ===
- Acesso MTV (2009–2013)
- Disk MTV (1990–2006)
- MTV1 (2012–2013)
- MTV Lab (2005–2011)
- My MTV (2012–2013)
- Para Gostar de Música (2009; 2012–13)
- Piores Clipes do Mundo (1999–2002)
- Teleguiado (1995–1999)
- Top 10 MTV (2008–13)
- Top 20 Brasil (1990–2006; 2013)
- Top Top MTV (2004–2010)

=== Variety ===
- Descarga MTV (2007–2009)
- Garganta e Torcicolo no Paraíso das Ovelhinhas (1997–1998)
- Gordo a Go-Go (2000–2005)
- Gordo Visita (2006–2009)
- Neura MTV (2006–2007)
- Scrap MTV (2008–2010)

=== Comedy ===
- 15 Minutos (2008–2010)
- Comédia MTV (2010–2011)
  - Comédia MTV Ao Vivo (2012)
- Furo MTV (2009–13)
- Hermes & Renato (1999–2010, 2013)
- PC na TV (2011–13)
- Quinta Categoria (2008–11)
- O Último Programa do Mundo (2013)

=== Animation ===
- Fudêncio e Seus Amigos (2005–2011)
- The Jorges (2007–2008)
  - Infortúnio com Funérea (2009–13)
- Megaliga MTV de VJs Paladinos (2003–2007)
- Rockstar Ghost (2007)

=== Lifestyle/Relationships ===
- Beija Sapo (2005–07)
- Fica Comigo (2000–03)
- IT MTV (2010–13)
- MTV sem Vergonha (2012–13)

=== Specials ===
- Luau MTV (1996–2004; 2007; 2011–2012)
- Rockgol (1995–2008; 2011; 2013)
- Video Music Brasil (1995–2012)

=== International shows ===
- Beavis and Butt-Head (2012–13)
- MTV Live
- MTV World Stage

==== Award shows ====
- Europe Music Awards
- Movie Awards
- Video Music Awards
- MTV Brasil
