= A Banda Mais Bonita da Cidade =

Brazilian band

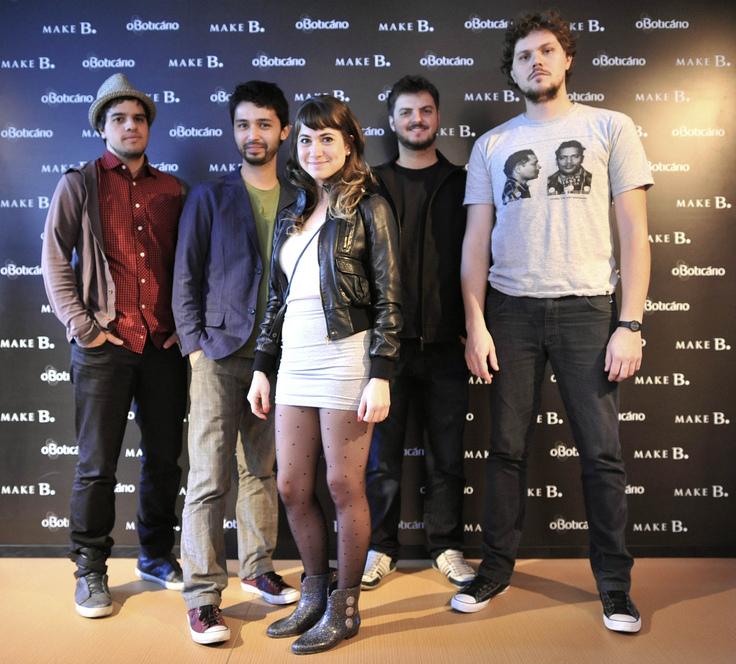

Background information
- Origin: Curitiba, Paraná, Brazil
- Genres: MPB, indie rock, indie folk
- Years active: 2009 – present
- Members: Uyara Torrente (vocalist); Vinícius Nisi (keyboardist); Rodrigo Lemos (guitarist); Diego Plaça (bassist); Luís Bourscheidt (drummer)
- Website: bandamaisbonitadacidade.com.br

A Banda Mais Bonita da Cidade (Portuguese pronunciation: [ɐ ˈbɐ̃dɐ ˈmajz boˈnitɐ dɐ siˈdadʒi], The Most Beautiful Band in Town) is a Brazilian MPB/indie rock band that gained popularity in late May 2011 following the release of its music video "Oração" ("Prayer") on YouTube.

The video received more than 4.9 million views in three weeks, and it became highly publicized by the Brazilian press after MTV named it video clip of the week. Shortly thereafter, a number of English-language news sources, including The Washington Post and NPR, drew international attention to the band.

== Formation and early musical endeavors ==
The band formed in 2009 in Curitiba, a city in the southern Brazilian state of Paraná. Its name was inspired by the title of the short story The Most Beautiful Woman in Town, by American author Charles Bukowski. In the beginning, the band performed songs by local composers, and since then, it has begun to adapt such songs to its own musical style. A Banda Mais Bonita da Cidade has performed publicly at the Wonka Bar in Curitiba, where its lead singer, Uyara Torrente, put on a show called "A Saudade Mata Gente, Panaca" ("Longing Kills People, Fool").

== Oração ==
The video clip for "Oração" was filmed as a long take on February 6, 2011, in a hundred-year-old house in Rio Negro, Paraná. In the clip, the song's composer, Leo Fressato, is filmed in real time as he sings and walks through the house with a microphone. Along the way, he encounters the band's musicians, who play their instruments and accompany him in singing. "Oração" is essentially a six-minute repetition of a chorus with four strophes. The video clip was released on May 13, 2011, and due to the music's catchy rhythm and simple message (a series of metaphors about the heart), it rapidly went viral in online social networks.

=== Influence ===
A Banda Mais Bonita da Cidade has stated that the video for "Oração" was influenced by the music video for "Nantes", a 2007 song by American band Beirut.

== Media response ==
On May 18, 2011, MTV named "Oração" video clip of the week. In the following days, both Brazilian and international news media published stories on the band, and many, including Globo, UOL, The Washington Post, and NPR, posted copies of "Oração" on their websites. Some Brazilian press sources have reported that A Banda Mais Bonita da Cidade appears to be at the center of a local indie rock movement in Curitiba called Novos Curitibanos (New Curitibans), which is similar to the São Paulo movement Novos Paulistas (New Paulistas). The latter movement is well known in Brazil due to the fame of many of its participating musicians, including Tulipa Ruiz, Dudu Tsuda (former member of Pato Fu), Tiê, and Thiago Pethit (winner of the MTV Bet Award at the 2010 MTV Video Music Brazil).

Within a week of its launch on YouTube, "Oração" inspired several tribute videos and parodies from fans and critics of the song.

== Discography ==
- A Banda Mais Bonita da Cidade (2009)
- Canções Que Vão Morrer no Ar – Compact Vinyl (2012)
- O Mais Feliz da Vida (2013)
- De Cima do Mundo Eu Vi o Tempo (2017)
