= MTV Lab =

- Country of origin: Brazil

Original release
- Network: MTV Brasil
- Release: 2005 – 2011

MTV Lab was a TV show that aired video clips on MTV Brasil. The program premiered in 2005, and ended in 2011.

It was created by MTV Brasil during the summer of 2005, after a number of viewers of the station complained that the station no longer featured video clips but instead was geared only towards the presentation of series and TV shows.

As the programming of MTV Brasil's summer lasts about three months, the program MTV Lab was inserted in the grid as a test (hence the suffix Lab, from laboratory) so that the station could get feedback from viewers.

The test was successful and MTV Lab had one of the highest ratings in the history of summer programming, which has allowed the program to continue throughout the year and include even more programs, such as purely musical ones.

MTV Lab was shown daily, and was divided into several blocks. It also had three channels on its website for online videos, the MTV Overdrive, and, Now Lab, Lab Lab and Classic Radio.

== Blocks ==
- Clássicos: aired the most successful clips of MTV history, usually rock, rap, and pop.
- Cult Trash: aired rougher clips of MTV.
- Radio: aired the popular hits.
- Now: aired the new music releases, from well-known or unknown artists.
- Matinal: aired a selection of current or old clips to start the morning.
- Toca Aí: aired video requested by singers and other celebrities.
- Ao Cubo: aired three clips from the same artists. The audience of the program sends SMS messages in each block of the program, responding to questions made by MTV related to the artist.
- BR: space dedicated to the presentation of clips from bands of the Brazilian independent scenario.
- Freak: derived from the old program Control Freak, the viewer decides what the next clip to be shown via SMS.
- Sap: subtitled music videos in Portuguese or English.
- Lab: aired random clips without correlation, it was the very first MTV Lab program.
- Verão: aired clips during Southern Hemisphere summer, from 8:00 p.m. to 9:00 p.m., clips consisted of playlists made by the public in the website of MTV Music Brazil.
- Especial: MTV Lab fixed block that aired only on special occasions with themes also specific: during the elections MTV Lab Especial aired clips related to protests. It was aired from 1:50 p.m. to 2:00 p.m. and from 9:20 p.m. to 9:30 p.m. and during New Year's Eve in 2008/2009 aired clips released in the previous year, from 22:00 p.m. to 1:00 p.m.. Before the debut of 2009 Summer Schedule of MTV, the block was aired daily from 8:00 p.m. to 9:00 p.m..

== Hours of exhibition ==
- 2:30 a.m. to 3:00 a.m. – MTV Lab Now (Monday to Friday)
- 3:00 a.m. to 5:00 a.m. – MTV Lab Clássicos
- 5:00 a.m. to 7:00 a.m. – MTV Lab Matinal
- 7:00 a.m. to 9:00 a.m. – MTV Lab Clássicos
- 9:00 a.m. to 9:30 a.m. – MTV Lab Now (Monday to Friday)
- 9:00 a.m. to 10:00 a.m. – MTV Lab Now (Saturday and Sunday)
- 10:00 a.m. to 11:00 p.m. – MTV Lab BR (Saturday and Sunday)
- 11:00 a.m. to 12:00 a.m. – MTV Lab Rádio (Saturday and Sunday)
- 12:00 p.m. to 13:00 p.m. – MTV Lab Verão
- 2:15 p.m. to 3:00 p.m. – MTV Lab Freak (Monday to Friday)
- 8:00 p.m. to 9:00 p.m. – MTV Lab Verão
- 9:45 p.m. to 10:30 p.m. – MTV Lab Sap (Monday to Thursday)
- 10:00 p.m. to 10:30 p.m. – MTV Lab Sap (Friday)

Note: the times of the programs are in the Brasília time-zone (GMT-3).
