= André Marques (actor) =

Brazilian actor, TV host and entertainer (born 1979)

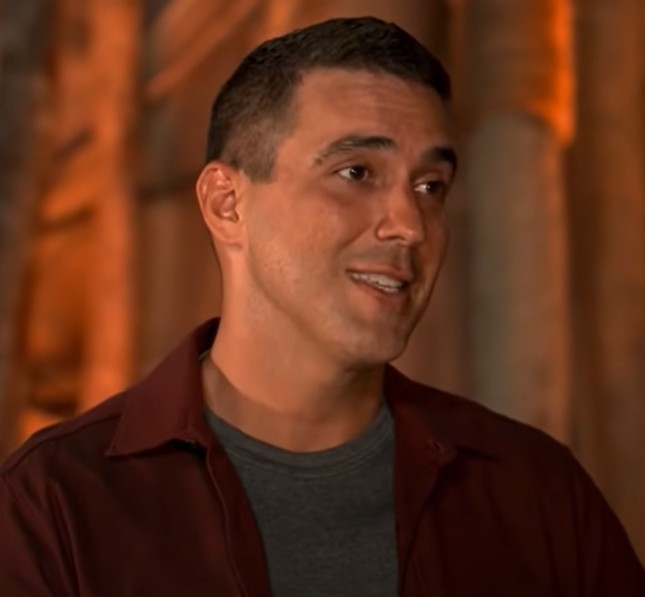
- Marques in 2021
- Born: September 24, 1979 (age 46); Niterói, Rio de Janeiro, Brazil
- Occupations: Actor, TV host and entertainer

André Marques (born September 24, 1979) is a Brazilian actor, TV host and entertainer.

As an actor, his first important role on TV was the high school student Mocotó in the soap opera Malhação.

He hosted the TV show Video Show at Globo TV.

In July 2009, it was confirmed he had contracted swine flu on a trip to Argentina during the 2009 global outbreak.
