= List of MTV series albums =

Various singers and bands from countries around the world, including Brazil, Germany, Colombia, Poland, the United States, India and Japan, have released MTV-branded albums after performing on MTV shows, a majority of these coming from MTV Unplugged. Most of the live albums are released as audio-only or as visual concert performance albums. Some albums are released as combinations of the two. In Brazil, albums are generally released as Acústico MTV or MTV ao Vivo, all different programs from MTV Brasil. MTV has also released compilation albums containing music videos or tracks from the various releases.

== Live albums ==
=== 1980s ===
Year	Album name	Artist	Label
1989	MTV Unplugged EP (released 2011)	The Smithereens	The Smithereens Record Company

=== 1990s ===
Year	Album name	Artist	Label
1991	Unplugged (The Official Bootleg)	Paul McCartney	Parlophone
1992	MTV Unplugged	Mariah Carey	Columbia
1992	Unplugged	Eric Clapton	Reprise, Duck, MTV
1992	Acústico MTV	João Bosco	Sony Music Brasil
1993	Unplugged	Arrested Development	Chrysalis
1993	In Concert/MTV Plugged	Bruce Springsteen	Columbia
1993	Unplugged...and Seated	Rod Stewart	Warner Bros.
1993	Unplugged	Neil Young	Reprise
1993	MTV Unplugged	10,000 Maniacs	Elektra
1993	Uptown MTV Unplugged	Jodeci, Father MC, Mary J. Blige, Christopher Williams, Heavy D & the Boys, "Buttnaked" Tim Dawg, Stud	UMG
1994	MTV Unplugged	Tony Bennett	Columbia
1994	MTV Unplugged in New York	Nirvana	DGC
1994	No Quarter: Jimmy Page and Robert Plant Unledded	Jimmy Page & Robert Plant	Atlantic
1994	Acústico MTV	Gilberto Gil	Warner Music Brasil
1995	MTV Unplugged	Bob Dylan	Columbia
1995	Unplugged	Herbert Grönemeyer	Capitol Music, EMI Music Germany
1995	MTV Unplugged	Los Tres	Sony (Chile), MTV Network
1995	Acústico MTV	Moraes Moreira	EMI Music Brasil
1996	MTV Unplugged (Hello!)	Charly García	Sony (Argentina)
1996	MTV Unplugged	Kiss	Mercury
1996	Unplugged	Alice in Chains	Columbia
1996	MTV Unplugged	El Tri	WEA
1996	Comfort y Música Para Volar	Soda Stereo	BMG, Ariola
1996	MTV Unplugged Live	Chage and Aska	Yamaha Music
1997	MTV Unplugged	Maxwell	Columbia
1997	MTV Unplugged	Aterciopelados	RCA
1997	MTV Unplugged NYC 1997	Babyface	Sony
1997	MTV Unplugged	Bryan Adams	A&M Records
1997	Acústico MTV	Titãs	Warner Music Brasil
1997	Acústico MTV	Gal Costa	Sony Music Brasil
1998	Acústico MTV	Rita Lee	Universal Music Brasil
1999	MTV Unplugged	Maná	Warner Music Latina
1999	MTV Unplugged	Alanis Morissette	Maverick, Reprise
1999	Unplugged	The Corrs	Atlantic, 143, Lava
1999	Estrelicia MTV Unplugged	Luis Alberto Spinetta	Sony
1999	Acústico MTV	Os Paralamas do Sucesso	EMI Music Brasil
1999	Acústico MTV	Legião Urbana	EMI Music Brasil
1999	Balada MTV	Barão Vermelho	Warner Music Brasil

=== 2000s ===
Year	Album name	Artist	Label
2000	MTV Unplugged	Shakira	Sony Colombia
2000	MTV Unplugged	Die Fantastischen Vier	Sony (Germany), Four Music, Columbia
2000	Acústico MTV	Capital Inicial	Sony Music Brasil
2000	Acústico MTV	Art Popular	EMI Music Brasil
2000	Acústico MTV	Lulu Santos	Sony Music Brasil
2000	MTV ao Vivo	Raimundos	Warner Music Brasil
2000	MTV ao Vivo	Ira!	Deckdisc
2001	MTV Unplugged	La Ley	WEA
2001	MTV Unplugged	Alejandro Sanz	WEA Latina
2001	MTV Unplugged	Jay-Z	Roc-A-Fella, Def Jam
2001	Acústico MTV	Cássia Eller	Universal Music Brasil
2001	Acústico MTV	Roberto Carlos	Sony Music Brasil
2001	MTV ao Vivo	Planet Hemp	Sony Music Brasil
2001	MTV ao Vivo	Skank	Sony Music Brasil
2002	MTV Unplugged No. 2.0	Lauryn Hill	Columbia
2002	Unplugged: Rock'n'Roll Realschule	Die Ärzte	Hot Action
2002	MTV Unplugged 2.0	Dashboard Confessional	Vagrant
2002	Acústico MTV	Cidade Negra	Sony Music Brasil
2002	Acústico MTV	Jorge Ben Jor	Universal Music Brasil
2002	Acústico MTV	Kid Abelha	Universal Music Brasil
2002	MTV ao Vivo	Pato Fu	Sony Music Brasil
2003	Un sorso in piu': Dal vivo a MTV Supersonic	Carmen Consoli	Universal Music Italia
2003	Acústico MTV	Marina Lima	EMI Music Brasil
2003	Acústico MTV	Charlie Brown Jr.	EMI Music Brasil
2003	Acústico MTV	Zeca Pagodinho	Universal Music Brasil
2003	MTV ao Vivo	Gabriel o Pensador	Sony Music Brasil
2003	MTV ao Vivo: Eletrodoméstico	Daniela Mercury	Sony Music Brasil
2003	MTV ao Vivo	Jota Quest	Sony Music Brasil
2004	MTV Unplugged	Diego Torres	Sony BMG, RCA
2004	Acústico MTV	Ira!	Sony Music Brasil
2004	Acústico MTV	Marcelo D2	Sony Music Brasil
2004	Acústico MTV	Engenheiros do Hawaii	Universal Music Brasil
2004	MTV ao Vivo	Ivete Sangalo	Universal Music Brasil
2004	MTV ao Vivo	Lulu Santos	Sony Music Brasil
2004	MTV ao Vivo	Nando Reis & Os Infernais	Universal Music Brasil
2004	MTV ao Vivo	Rita Lee	EMI Music Brasil
2005	MTV Unplugged	Café Tacuba	Warner Music México, MTV Networks Latin America
2005	Unplugged	Alicia Keys	J
2005	Sound Drop MTV Unplugged+Acoustic Live 2005	Hitomi Yaida	Aozora
2005	Nur zu Besuch: Unplugged im Wiener Burgtheater	Die Toten Hosen	JKP
2005	Acústico MTV: Bandas Gaúchas	Bidê ou Balde, Cachorro Grande, Ultramen, Wander Wildner	Sony Music Brasil
2005	Acústico MTV	Ultraje a Rigor	Deckdisc
2005	Acústico MTV	O Rappa	Warner Music Brasil
2005	MTV ao Vivo	Falamansa	Deckdisc
2005	MTV ao Vivo	Titãs	Sony Music Brasil
2005	MTV ao Vivo	Barão Vermelho	Warner Music Brasil
2005	MTV Especial: Aborto Elétrico	Capital Inicial	Sony Music Brasil
2006	The Veronicas: Mtv.com Live	The Veronicas	Sire
2006	MTV Unplugged	Ricky Martin	Sony BMG Norte
2006	Acústico MTV	Lenine	Sony Music Brasil
2006	Acústico MTV II: Gafieira	Zeca Pagodinho	Universal Music Brasil
2006	MTV ao Vivo	Fernanda Abreu	Universal Music Brasil
2006	MTV ao Vivo	CPM 22	Universal Music Brasil
2007	MTV Unplugged	Korn	EMI, Virgin
2007	MTV Unplugged	Kayah	Kayax
2007	MTV Unplugged	Tomoyasu Hotei	EMI Music Japan
2007	MTV Unplugged	Hey	Universal Music Polska
2007	Acústico MTV	Lobão	Sony Music Brasil
2007	Acústico MTV	Sandy & Junior	Universal Music Brasil
2007	Acústico MTV	Paulinho da Viola	Sony Music Brasil
2007	MTV ao Vivo: 5 Bandas de Rock	Forfun, Fresno, Hateen, Moptop, NX Zero	Universal Music Brasil
2007	Luau MTV	Nando Reis & Os Infernais	Universal Music Brasil
2008	MTV.com Live: Avril Lavigne	Avril Lavigne	—N/a
2008	MTV Unplugged	Julieta Venegas	Sony Music International
2008	Wettsingen in Schwetzingen - MTV Unplugged	Söhne Mannheims/Xavier Naidoo	Tonpool
2009	MTV Unplugged	Aunty Disco Project	—N/a
2009	MTV Unplugged	Katy Perry	Capitol
2009	MTV Unplugged	Wilki	Parlophone, EMI
2009	MTV Unplugged in New York	Sportfreunde Stiller	Vertigo
2009	MTV ao Vivo	Arlindo Cruz	Deckdisc
2009	Especial MTV: Estação Melodia ao Vivo	Luiz Melodia	Biscoito Fino
2009	Especial MTV: Uma Prova de Amor ao Vivo	Zeca Pagodinho	Universal Music Brasil

=== 2010s ===
Year	Album name	Artist	Label
2010	MTV Unplugged	Ayaka	Warner (Japan)
2010	MTV Unplugged: Live aus'm MV	Sido	Aggro Berlin, Urban, Universal Music
2010	Above and Beyond – MTV Unplugged	Mando Diao	Musica de la Santa
2010	MTV Unplugged^{[A]}	Trey Songz	Atlantic, WEA International
2010	MTV Unplugged	Kult	SP
2010	Acústico MTV II	Lulu Santos	Universal Music Brasil
2010	MTV ao Vivo	Marcelo Camelo	Zé Pereira
2010	MTV ao Vivo: Bailão do Ruivão	Nando Reis & Os Infernais	Universal Music Brasil
2011	MTV Unplugged/Música de Fondo	Zoé	EMI
2011	MTV Unplugged: Los Tigres del Norte and Friends	Los Tigres del Norte	Fonovisa
2011	MTV Unplugged	Thirty Seconds to Mars	Virgin, Capitol
2011	MTV Unplugged - Live aus dem Hotel Atlantic	Udo Lindenberg	Warner, Starwatch
2011	MTV ao Vivo: Zii & Zie	Caetano Veloso	Universal Music Brasil
2011	Especial MTV: A Curva da Cintura	Arnaldo Antunes, Edgard Scandurra, Toumani Diabaté	Rosa Celeste
2012	MTV Unplugged	Florence and the Machine	Island
2012	MTV Unplugged	Beni	Nayutawave
2012	MTV Unplugged	Juanes	Universal Music Latino
2012	MTV Unplugged	Juju	Sony (Japan)
2012	MTV Unplugged II	Die Fantastischen Vier	Sony (Germany), COL7ONE
2012	Acústico MTV	Arnaldo Antunes	Rosa Celeste
2013	MTV Unplugged: Kahedi Radio Show	Max Herre	Universal Music
2013	MTV Unplugged in Athens	Scorpions	Music for Millions, RTL Interactive, Sony
2014	Unplugged: The Complete 1991 and 2001 Sessions	R.E.M.	Rhino
2014	MTV Unplugged	Gentleman	Vertigo, Capitol
2015	MTV Unplugged	Cro	Chimperator
2015	MTV Unplugged in drei Akten	Revolverheld	Sony (Germany)
2015	MTV Unplugged	Placebo	Vertigo
2015	MTV Unplugged: Unter Dampf - Ohne Strom	Unheilig	Vertigo
2016	MTV Unplugged	Westernhagen	Virgin
2017	MTV Unplugged - Summer Solstice	A-ha	We Love Music, Polydor, Universal
2017	MTV Unplugged	Shawn Mendes	Island Records
2017	MTV Unplugged	Bleachers	Island Records
2017	Listen Without Prejudice / MTV Unplugged	George Michael	Columbia
2017	MTV Unplugged	Peter Maffay	Sony, RCA
2018	MTV Unplugged: Live at Roundhouse, London	Biffy Clyro	Warner Bros. Records
2018	MTV Unplugged	Andreas Gabalier	Electrola
2018	MTV Unplugged 2 - Live vom Atlantik	Udo Lindenberg	Warner
2019	Un Segundo MTV Unplugged	Café Tacuba	Universal Music
2019	MTV Unplugged: Live	DMA's	I Oh You
2019	MTV Unplugged	Max Raabe & Palast Orchester	Deutsche Grammophon
2019	MTV Unplugged	Santiano	Electrola

=== 2020s ===
Year	Album name	Artist	Label
2020	MTV Unplugged (Live at Hull City Hall)	Liam Gallagher	Warner

== Video albums ==
Year	Album name	Artist	Label
1992	MTV Unplugged +3	Mariah Carey	Columbia
1994	Acústico MTV	Gilberto Gil	Warner Music Brasil
1995	Acústico MTV	Moraes Moreira	EMI Music Brasil
1996	MTV Unplugged Live	Chage and Aska	Yamaha Music
1997	Acústico MTV	Titãs	Warner Music Brasil
1997	Acústico MTV	Gal Costa	Sony Music Brasil
1998	Acústico MTV	Rita Lee	Universal Music Brasil
1999	MTV Unplugged	Maná	Warner Music Latina
1999	Acústico MTV	Os Paralamas do Sucesso	EMI Music Brasil
1999	Acústico MTV	Legião Urbana	EMI Music Brasil
2000	Unplugged	The Corrs	Atlantic, 143, Lava
2000	Acústico MTV	Capital Inicial	Sony Music Brasil
2000	Acústico MTV	Art Popular	EMI Music Brasil
2000	Acústico MTV	Lulu Santos	Sony Music Brasil
2000	MTV ao Vivo	Raimundos	Warner Music Brasil
2000	MTV ao Vivo	Ira!	Deckdisc
2001	Unplugged	Hikaru Utada	EMI Music Japan
2001	Acústico MTV	Cássia Eller	Universal Music Brasil
2001	Acústico MTV	Roberto Carlos	Sony Music Brasil
2001	MTV ao Vivo	Planet Hemp	Sony Music Brasil
2001	MTV ao Vivo	Skank	Sony Music Brasil
2001	Álbum MTV	Cássia Eller	Universal Music Brasil
2002	MTV Unplugged / Live	Björk	One Little Indian
2002	MTV Unplugged	Shakira	Columbia, Sony Latin
2002	MTV Unplugged	Staind	Elektra Entertainment
2002	Unplugged: Rock'n'Roll Realschule	Die Ärzte	Hot Action
2002	Acústico MTV	Cidade Negra	Sony Music Brasil
2002	Acústico MTV	Jorge Ben Jor	Universal Music Brasil
2002	Acústico MTV	Kid Abelha	Universal Music Brasil
2002	MTV ao Vivo	Pato Fu	Sony Music Brasil
2003	MTV Unplugged	Ken Hirai	DefStar
2003	Acústico MTV	Marina Lima	EMI Music Brasil
2003	Acústico MTV	Charlie Brown Jr.	EMI Music Brasil
2003	Acústico MTV	Zeca Pagodinho	Universal Music Brasil
2003	MTV ao Vivo	Gabriel o Pensador	Sony Music Brasil
2003	MTV ao Vivo: Eletrodoméstico	Daniela Mercury	Sony Music Brasil
2003	MTV ao Vivo	Jota Quest	Sony Music Brasil
2004	Acústico MTV	Ira!	Sony Music Brasil
2004	Acústico MTV	Marcelo D2	Sony Music Brasil
2004	Acústico MTV	Engenheiros do Hawaii	Universal Music Brasil
2004	MTV ao Vivo	Ivete Sangalo	Universal Music Brasil
2004	MTV ao Vivo	Lulu Santos	Sony Music Brasil
2004	MTV ao Vivo	Nando Reis & Os Infernais	Universal Music Brasil
2004	MTV ao Vivo	Rita Lee	EMI
2005	MTV Unplugged	Diego Torres	Sony BMG, RCA
2005	MTV Unplugged	Hitomi Yaida	Aozora
2005	Acústico MTV: Bandas Gaúchas	Bidê ou Balde, Cachorro Grande, Ultramen, Wander Wildner	Sony Music Brasil
2005	Acústico MTV	Ultraje a Rigor	Deckdisc
2005	Acústico MTV	O Rappa	Warner Music Brasil
2005	MTV ao Vivo	Falamansa	Deckdisc
2005	MTV ao Vivo	Titãs	Sony Music Brasil
2005	MTV ao Vivo	Barão Vermelho	Warner Music Brasil
2005	MTV Especial: Aborto Elétrico	Capital Inicial	Sony Music Brasil
2006	MTV Unplugged	Ricky Martin	Sony BMG Norte
2006	Acústico MTV	Lenine	Sony Music Brasil
2006	Acústico MTV II: Gafieira	Zeca Pagodinho	Universal Music Brasil
2006	MTV ao Vivo	Fernanda Abreu	Universal Music Brasil
2006	MTV ao Vivo	CPM 22	Universal Music Brasil
2006	Box MTV	Barão Vermelho	Warner Music Brasil
2006	Balada MTV	Barão Vermelho	Warner Music Brasil
2007	MTV Premium Live in Duo	Shinji Harada	Happinet
2007	Comfort y Música Para Volar	Soda Stereo	Sony
2007	MTV Unplugged	Kayah	Kayax
2007	MTV Unplugged	Tomoyasu Hotei	EMI Music Japan
2007	MTV Unplugged in New York	Nirvana	DGC
2007	MTV Unplugged	Hey	Universal Music Polska
2007	Acústico MTV	Lobão	Sony Music Brasil
2007	Acústico MTV	Sandy & Junior	Universal Music Brasil
2007	Acústico MTV	Paulinho da Viola	Sony Music Brasil
2007	MTV ao Vivo: 5 Bandas de Rock	Forfun, Fresno, Hateen, Moptop, NX Zero	Universal Music Brasil
2007	Luau MTV	Nando Reis & Os Infernais	Universal Music Brasil
2008	MTV Unplugged	Julieta Venegas	Sony Music International
2009	Especial MTV: Estação Melodia ao Vivo	Luiz Melodia	Biscoito Fino
2009	Especial MTV: Uma Prova de Amor ao Vivo	Zeca Pagodinho	Universal Music Brasil
2009	MTV Unplugged	Katy Perry	Capitol
2009	MTV Unplugged	Wilki	Parlophone, EMI
2009	MTV ao Vivo	Arlindo Cruz	Deckdisc
2010	MTV Unplugged	Ayaka	Warner (Japan)
2010	MTV Unplugged: Live aus'm MV	Sido	Aggro Berlin, Urban, Universal Music
2010	Above and Beyond – MTV Unplugged	Mando Diao	Musica de la Santa
2010	MTV Unplugged	Kult	SP
2010	Acústico MTV II	Lulu Santos	Universal Music Brasil
2010	MTV ao Vivo	Marcelo Camelo	Zé Pereira
2010	MTV ao Vivo: Bailão do Ruivão	Nando Reis & Os Infernais	Universal Music Brasil
2011	MTV Unplugged/Música de Fondo	Zoé	EMI
2011	MTV Unplugged: Los Tigres del Norte and Friends	Los Tigres del Norte	Fonovisa
2011	Unplugged	Thirty Seconds to Mars	MTV Networks, Viacom International
2011	MTV ao Vivo: Zii & Zie	Caetano Veloso	Universal Music Brasil
2011	Especial MTV: A Curva da Cintura	Arnaldo Antunes, Edgard Scandurra, Toumani Diabaté	Rosa Celeste
2012	MTV Unplugged	Florence and the Machine	Island
2012	MTV Unplugged	Beni	Nayutawave
2012	MTV Unplugged	Juanes	Universal Music Latino
2012	Acústico MTV	Arnaldo Antunes	Rosa Celeste
2013	MTV Unplugged: Kahedi Radio Show	Max Herre	Universal Music
2013	MTV Unplugged in Athens	Scorpions	Music for Millions, RTL Interactive, Sony
2013	MTV Unplugged	Kana Nishino	Sony (Japan)
2014	REMTV	R.E.M.	Rhino
2015	MTV Unplugged	Cro	Chimperator
2015	MTV Unplugged in drei Akten	Revolverheld	Sony (Germany)

== Compilation albums ==
=== Live albums ===
Year	Album name	Label
1994	The Unplugged Collection, Volume One	Warner Records
2002	The Very Best of MTV Unplugged	UMTV
2003	The Very Best of MTV Unplugged 2	UMTV
2004	The Very Best of MTV Unplugged 3	UMTV

=== Video albums ===
Year	Album name	Label
2001	MTV20 — Collection	Image Entertainment
2001	MTV20 — Jams	Image Entertainment
2001	MTV20 — Pop	Image Entertainment
2001	MTV20 — Rock	Image Entertainment
2004	The Very Best of MTV Unplugged 3	UMTV

== Notes ==
- A This album, digitally released, also contains a video for "Yo Side of the Bed" as track nine.
