= List of artists featured on MTV Unplugged =

Below is a list of musical artists, bands, and groups that have performed on the television series MTV Unplugged.

== Performances by date ==
=== 1989 ===
- Neil Young – The Palladium, NYC, September 5 and 6 (pre-taped concert that MTV aired on February 24, 1990, with an introduction by Jules Shear)
- Squeeze, Syd Straw and Elliot Easton – National Video Center, NYC, October 31
- The Smithereens and Graham Parker – National Video Center, NYC, December 13
- 10,000 Maniacs and Michael Penn – National Video Center, NYC, December 13
- The Alarm and Nuclear Valdez – National Video Center, NYC, December 14
- Joe Walsh and Dr. John – National Video Center, NYC, December 14

=== 1990 ===
- Stevie Ray Vaughan and Joe Satriani – National Video Center, NYC, January 30
- Michelle Shocked and Indigo Girls – National Video Center, NYC, January 30
- Sinéad O'Connor and The Church – National Video Center, NYC, January 30
- Don Henley – Hollywood Center Studios, Los Angeles, March 30
- Great White and Damn Yankees – Hollywood Center Studios, Los Angeles, March 30
- Crowded House and Tim Finn – Hollywood Center Studios, Los Angeles, March 30
- Hall & Oates – Chelsea Studios, NYC, May 17
- Elton John – Chelsea Studios, NYC, May 17
- Aerosmith – Ed Sullivan Theater, NYC, August 11
- Crosby, Stills & Nash – Ed Sullivan Theater, NYC, August 11
- Ratt and Vixen – Ed Sullivan Theater, NYC, August 11
- The Black Crowes and Tesla – National Video Center, NYC, November 19
- The Allman Brothers Band – National Video Center, NYC, November 19
- Poison – National Video Center, NYC, November 19

=== 1991 ===
- The Cure – London Limehouse TV Studios, London, January 24
- Paul McCartney – London Limehouse TV Studios, London, January 25 (See also Unplugged)
- Winger and Slaughter – National Video Center, NYC, March 5
- Sting – National Video Center, NYC, March 5
- R.E.M. – Chelsea Studios, NYC, April 10 (See also Unplugged: The Complete 1991 and 2001 Sessions)
- Yo! Unplugged Rap: LL Cool J, MC Lyte, De La Soul, A Tribe Called Quest and Pop's Cool Love – Chelsea Studios, NYC, April 10
- Elvis Costello – Warner Hollywood Studios, Los Angeles, June 3

=== 1992 ===
- Eric Clapton – Bray Film Studios, Windsor, England, January 16 (See also Unplugged)
- Paul Simon – Kaufman Astoria Studios, Astoria, Queens, New York, March 4
- R&B Unplugged: Boyz II Men, Shanice and Joe Public – Kaufman Astoria Studios, Astoria, Queens, New York, March 16
- Mariah Carey with Trey Lorenz – Kaufman Astoria Studios, Astoria, Queens, New York, March 16 (See also MTV Unplugged)
- Pearl Jam – Kaufman Astoria Studios, Astoria, Queens, New York, March 16 (See also MTV Unplugged)
- Queensrÿche – Warner Hollywood Studios, Los Angeles, April 27
- John Mellencamp – Warner Hollywood Studios, Los Angeles, April 27
- Joe Cocker – Montreux Jazz Festival, Montreux Casino, Montreux, Switzerland, July 2
- Annie Lennox – Montreux Jazz Festival, Montreux Casino, Montreux, Switzerland, July 3
- Eurythmics – Montreux Jazz Festival, Montreux Casino, Montreux, Switzerland, July 5
- Bruce Springsteen – Warner Hollywood Studios, Los Angeles, September 22 (See also In Concert/MTV Plugged)
- k.d. lang – Ed Sullivan Theater, NYC, December 16 (aired in 1993)
- Neil Young – Ed Sullivan Theater, NYC, December 16 (never aired)
- Arrested Development – Ed Sullivan Theater, NYC, December 17 (aired in 1993) (See also Unplugged)

=== 1993 ===
- Roxette – Stockholm Circus, Sweden, January 9
- Rod Stewart with Ronnie Wood – Universal Studios, Los Angeles, February 5 (See also Unplugged...and Seated)
- Denis Leary – Universal Studios, Los Angeles, February 6
- Uptown Unplugged: Jodeci, Father MC, Mary J. Blige, Christopher Williams and Heavy D – Universal Studios, Los Angeles, February 6
- Neil Young – Universal Studios, Los Angeles, February 7 (See also Unplugged)
- Midnight Oil – Sony Music Studios, NYC, April 20
- Spoken Word I: 99, Maggie Estep, Barry Yourgrau, Reg E. Gaines, Bob Holman, Edwin Torres and Henry Rollins – Sony Music Studios, NYC, April 20
- 10,000 Maniacs with special guest David Byrne – Sony Music Studios, NYC, April 21 (See also MTV Unplugged)
- Soul Asylum w/ special guest Lulu – Sony Music Studios, NYC, April 21
- Boom Crash Opera – Melbourne's Channel Nine studios, June
- Duran Duran – Sony Music Studios, NYC, November 17
- Stone Temple Pilots – Sony Music Studios, NYC, November 17 (aired in 1994)
- Nirvana with guest appearance by Meat Puppets – Sony Music Studios, NYC, November 18 (See also MTV Unplugged in New York)

=== 1994 ===
- Tony Bennett – Sony Music Studios, NYC, April 12 (see also MTV Unplugged: Tony Bennett)
- Spoken Word II: MC Lyte, Toby Huss, Bahiyyih Maroon, Eric Bogosian, Matthew Courtney, Hal Sirowitz, Gil Scott-Heron, Larry McDonald, and Wanda Phipps – Sony Music Studios, NYC, April 13
- Spoken Word III: Max Blagg, Danny Hoch, Maggie Estep, Jim Carroll, John S. Hall; and Paul Beatty – Sony Music Studios, NYC, April 13
- Lenny Kravitz – Sony Music Studios, NYC, April 14
- Page and Plant – London Studios, London, England, August 25–26 (see also No Quarter: Jimmy Page and Robert Plant Unledded)
- Los Fabulosos Cadillacs – Miami, September 29 (first Latin/Spanish Unplugged)
- Caifanes – Miami, October 28 (first Mexican Rock Unplugged)
- Björk – Fountain Studios, London, England, recorded on September 1, aired on November 7 (see also MTV Unplugged / Live and Debut Live)
- Eagles – Warner Brothers Studios, Burbank, CA, November 8 (see also Hell Freezes Over)
- Bob Dylan – Sony Music Studios, NYC, November 17–18 (see also MTV Unplugged)

=== 1995 ===
- Hole – Brooklyn Academy of Music – Brooklyn, NY, February 14
- The Cranberries – Brooklyn Academy of Music – Brooklyn, NY, February 14
- Melissa Etheridge with Bruce Springsteen – Brooklyn Academy of Music – Brooklyn, NY, February 15
- Live – Brooklyn Academy of Music – Brooklyn, NY, February 15
- Sheryl Crow – Brooklyn Academy of Music – Brooklyn, NY, February 15
- Charly García – Miami, April 28 (See also Hello! MTV Unplugged)
- Herbert Grönemeyer – Studio Babelsberg, Berlin, Germany, May 14
- Café Tacuba – Miami, May 15 (See also MTV Unplugged)
- Chris Isaak – Sony Music Studios, NYC, June 9
- Kiss – Sony Music Studios, NYC, August 8 (See also KISS Unplugged)
- Los Tres – Miami, September 14 (See also Los Tres MTV Unplugged)

=== 1996 ===
- Soda Stereo with Andrea Echeverri – Miami, March 12 (See also Comfort y Música Para Volar)
- Seal – Brooklyn Academy of Music, Brooklyn, NY, April 9
- Alice in Chains – Brooklyn Academy of Music, Brooklyn, NY, April 10 (See also Unplugged)
- Tori Amos – Brooklyn Academy of Music, Brooklyn, NY, April 11
- Hootie & the Blowfish – The Horseshoe (at the University of South Carolina), Columbia, South Carolina, April 19
- Illya Kuryaki and the Valderramas – Miami, April 26
- CHAGE and ASKA – The Fountain Studios, London, June 19
- Harlem Yu – The Fountain Studios, London, June
- Colonial Cousins – The Fountain Studios, London, June
- El Tri – Miami, June (See also MTV Unplugged)
- Oasis, excluding Liam Gallagher, with Noel Gallagher on lead vocals – Royal Festival Hall, London, England, August 23
- George Michael – Three Mills Studios, London, England, October 11 (See also MTV Unplugged)
- Maldita Vecindad – MTV Studios, Miami, October 12

=== 1997 ===
- Santa Sabina – Miami Broadcast Center, Miami, Florida, April 2
- Luis Alberto Spinetta – Miami, April 19 (aired in 2004)
- The Wallflowers – Brooklyn Academy of Music, NY, May 5
- Maxwell – Brooklyn Academy of Music, NY, June 15
- Jewel – Brooklyn Academy of Music, NY, June 24
- Fiona Apple – Aired July 2
- BLACKstreet – Brooklyn Academy of Music, NY, September 3
- Aterciopelados – Miami, September 7
- Bryan Adams – Hammerstein Ballroom, NYC, September 26 (See also MTV Unplugged)
- Kenneth "Babyface" Edmonds with Eric Clapton and Stevie Wonder – New York City, October 18
- Erykah Badu – November 18

=== 1998 ===
- Björk (Live 'n' Loud) – MTV Studios, New York, February 22
- Los Ratones Paranoicos – MTV studios, Miami, March 11

=== 1999 ===
- Maná – Miami, March 10 (See also Maná MTV Unplugged)
- Shakira – Manhattan Center Studios, New York, August 12 (See also MTV Unplugged)
- Alanis Morissette – The Brooklyn Academy of Music, New York, September 18 (See also Alanis Unplugged)
- The Corrs – Ardmore Studios, Co. Wicklow, Ireland, October 5 (See also The Corrs Unplugged)
- Incubus – AT&T Studios, Los Angeles, November 6

=== 2000 ===
- Die Fantastischen Vier – Stalactite cave in Balve in the Sauerland, Germany, September 20

=== 2001 ===
- R.E.M. – MTV Studios, NYC, May 21 (See also Unplugged: The Complete 1991 and 2001 Sessions)
- Hikaru Utada – Tennouzu Studio, Tokyo, Japan, June 21
- La Ley – Miami Broadcast Center, June 28
- Staind – MTV Studios, New York City, July 16 (See also MTV Unplugged)
- Lauryn Hill – MTV Studios, New York City, July 21 (See also MTV Unplugged No. 2.0)
- Alejandro Sanz – Gusman Center, Miami, October 2 (See also MTV Unplugged)
- Jay-Z with The Roots, MTV Studios, New York City, November 11 (See also Jay-Z: Unplugged)

=== 2002 ===
- Dashboard Confessional – MTV Studios, April 24 (See also MTV Unplugged 2.0)
- Die Ärzte – Albert-Schweitzer-Gymnasium, Hamburg, Germany, August 31 (See also Unplugged - Rock'n'Roll Realschule)

=== 2003 ===
- Ken Hirai – February 13
- Nickelback – MTV Studios, Bussum, Netherlands, September 16

=== 2004 ===
- Diego Torres – Buenos Aires, Argentina, March 4

=== 2005 ===
- Hitomi Yaida – Tokyo FM, Tokyo, Japan, April 24
- Queens of the Stone Age – SilverWings, Berlin, Germany, June 10
- Giorgia – June 20 (aired April 29)
- Alicia Keys – Brooklyn Academy of Music, NY, July 14 (See also Unplugged)
- Die Toten Hosen – Burgtheater, Vienna, Austria, September 1–2 (See also Nur zu Besuch: Unplugged im Wiener Burgtheater)

=== 2006 ===
- Ricky Martin – Miami, August 17 (See also MTV Unplugged)
- Kayah – Toya film studio, Lodz, Poland, November 28 (See also MTV Unplugged)
- Korn, with guest appearance by Amy Lee of Evanescence, and Robert Smith and Simon Gallup of The Cure – MTV Studios, NYC, December 9 (See also MTV Unplugged: Korn)

=== 2007 ===
- Hey – September 10
- Bon Jovi – June 22
- Mary J. Blige
- Kenny Chesney
- John Mayer
- Alex Britti September 24 (aired September 29)
- Ne-Yo
- Joss Stone
- Maroon 5

=== 2008 ===
- Julieta Venegas – Estudios Churubusco, Mexico City, March 6 (See also MTV Unplugged)
- Söhne Mannheims vs. Xavier Naidoo – Schlosstheater Schwetzingen, Germany, July 2
- Amy Winehouse

=== 2009 ===
- Sportfreunde Stiller
- Adele
- Silversun Pickups
- All Time Low
- Paramore
- Katy Perry – NEP Midtown Studios, New York City, July 22, 2009 (See also MTV Unplugged)
- Ayaka – Osaka-jō Hall, Osaka, Japan, November 18
- The Script
- Wilki
- Tomoya Nagase

=== 2010 ===
- Vampire Weekend
- Sido
- Despina Vandi
- Adam Lambert
- Trey Songz
- The Script
- Phoenix
- Mando Diao
- Kult
- Panda
- Camila
- B.o.B
- Train

=== 2011 ===
- Thirty Seconds to Mars – May 13, New York City
- Zoé
- Lykke Li – April 7
- Los Tigres del Norte – May 24 at Hollywood Palladium in Los Angeles, CA
- Lil Wayne – June 12
- Salyu – June 13 Billboard Live TOKYO
- Mumford & Sons – June 24

=== 2012 ===
- Juanes – February 1
- Florence and the Machine with guest appearance by Josh Homme–April 2 at Angel Orensanz Center, New York (See also: MTV Unplugged)
- Walk the Moon – August 2
- Rita Ora – September 7
- Die Fantastischen Vier – Sony Music Studios in Berlin, Germany, October 26

=== 2013 ===
- Scorpions – Athens, Greece

=== 2014 ===
- Gentleman
- Miley Cyrus – January 29
- Kinky – June 3
- Pepe Aguilar – June 5

=== 2015 ===
- Cro – July 3
- Placebo – August 19
- Enrique Bunbury – September 1
- Unheilig – October 3–5

=== 2016 ===
- Mika Nakashima – January 10
- Miguel Bosé – May 12
- Mizuki Nana – October 23

=== 2017 ===
- O.S.T.R. – March 20
- Emmanuel – June 15
- A-ha – Ocean Sound Recordings, Giske, Norway, October 3 (See also MTV Unplugged – Summer Solstice)
- Shawn Mendes – The Theatre at Ace Hotel, Los Angeles (See also MTV Unplugged)
- Bleachers featuring Lorde and Carly Rae Jepsen – The Stone Pony, Asbury Park, New Jersey

=== 2018 ===
- Molotov – April 12
- Los Auténticos Decadentes – May 24
- Biffy Clyro – May 25, Recorded at Roundhouse, London
- Gang of Youths – July 25, Recorded at Cobblestone Pavilion, Melbourne
- DMA's – October 11, Recorded at Memo Music Hall, Melbourne, (See also MTV Unplugged: Live (DMA's album))

=== 2019 ===
- Café Tacuba – March 5, Sala Nezahualcóyotl, Centro Cultural Universitario, CDMX.
- Liam Gallagher – August 3, Recorded at Hull City Hall, Hull

=== 2020 ===
In light of the COVID-19 pandemic, MTV rebranded the show to MTV Unplugged at Home, as part of the network's #AloneTogether campaign, a social media initiative created to encourage the practice of social distancing among young people "in the hope of 'flattening the curve'" of the outbreak. It became an online series instead, with episodes released on MTV's YouTube, Instagram, and Twitter accounts, and featured a mix of local and international artists performing from their respective homes around the world.

- Wyclef Jean – March 20. Jean was the first artist to perform under the new At Home format
- JoJo – March 25
- Yungblud – April 1, Los Angeles
- Alessia Cara – April 3. Cara was the first artist featured after MTV announced the official launch of At Home as a livestreaming series earlier that same day.
- Melissa Etheridge – April 7
- Finneas O'Connell – April 10
- Jewel – April 14
- Shaggy – April 17
- Kiana Ledé – April 21
- Monsta X – April 24
- Bazzi – May 1
- Marcus Mumford – May 5
- CNCO – May 8
- Hayley Kiyoko – May 12
- Clueso – May 20, Germany
- Fobia – October 2, Frontón Mexico in Mexico City. The band was the first to record under the concert-without-an-audience format for the show. The location of the performance was not disclosed at the time to avoid crowds outside the venue.
- Miley Cyrus – October 16, Los Angeles

=== 2021 ===
- BTS – February 23, South Korea
- Tony Bennett and Lady Gaga – aired December 16
- Bastille with Charlie Barnes – aired December 23

=== 2022 ===
- Twenty One Pilots – aired June 9
- Liella! – aired May 27 & 28

=== 2023 ===
- A Hip Hop 50th Celebration of Jersey's Finest: Heather B., Lady Luck, Lords of the Underground, Poor Righteous Teachers, Queen Latifah, Redman, The Sugarhill Gang, Treach, Wyclef Jean – Newark Symphony Hall, Newark, NJ – aired December 14.

=== 2024 ===
- Los Bunkers – October 9, Santiago, Chile

=== European MTV ===
- Phil Collins (1994)

=== Brazilian Acústico MTV ===
- Marcelo Nova – 1990 (never aired)
- Barão Vermelho – 1991
- Legião Urbana – January 28, 1992
- João Bosco – January 28, 1992
- Gilberto Gil – January 18, 1994
- Moraes Moreira – June 6, 1995
- Titãs – March 6 and 7, 1997
- Gal Costa – July 17, 1997
- Rita Lee – June 4 and 5, 1998
- Os Paralamas do Sucesso – July 5 and 6, 1999
- Capital Inicial – March 21, 2000
- Art Popular – May 7, 2000
- Lulu Santos – June 28 and 29, 2000
- Cássia Eller – March 7 and 8, 2001
- Roberto Carlos – May 8 and 9, 2001 (never aired)
- Cidade Negra – November 25 and 26, 2001
- Jorge Ben Jor – January 30 and 31, 2002
- Kid Abelha – September 17 and 18, 2002
- Marina Lima – March 21 and 22, 2003
- Charlie Brown Jr. – August 5 and 6, 2003
- Zeca Pagodinho – September 9 and 10, 2003
- Ira! – March 24 and 25, 2004
- Marcelo D2 – July 14 and 15, 2004
- Engenheiros do Hawaii – August 18 and 19, 2004
- Bandas Gaúchas: Bidê ou Balde, Cachorro Grande, Ultramen and Wander Wildner – February 26 and 27, 2005
- Ultraje a Rigor – June 22 and 23, 2005
- O Rappa – July 15 and 16, 2005
- Lenine – June 24 and 25, 2006
- Zeca Pagodinho – August 23 and 24, 2006
- Lobão – December 6 and 7, 2006
- Sandy & Junior – June 5 and 6, 2007
- Paulinho da Viola – July 24 and 25, 2007
- Lulu Santos – June 23, 2010
- Arnaldo Antunes – December 4, 2011
- Tiago Iorc – May 30, 2019
- Manu Gavassi – November 1, 2022

== Grammy awards and nominations received for Unplugged ==
MTV Unplugged awards and nominations
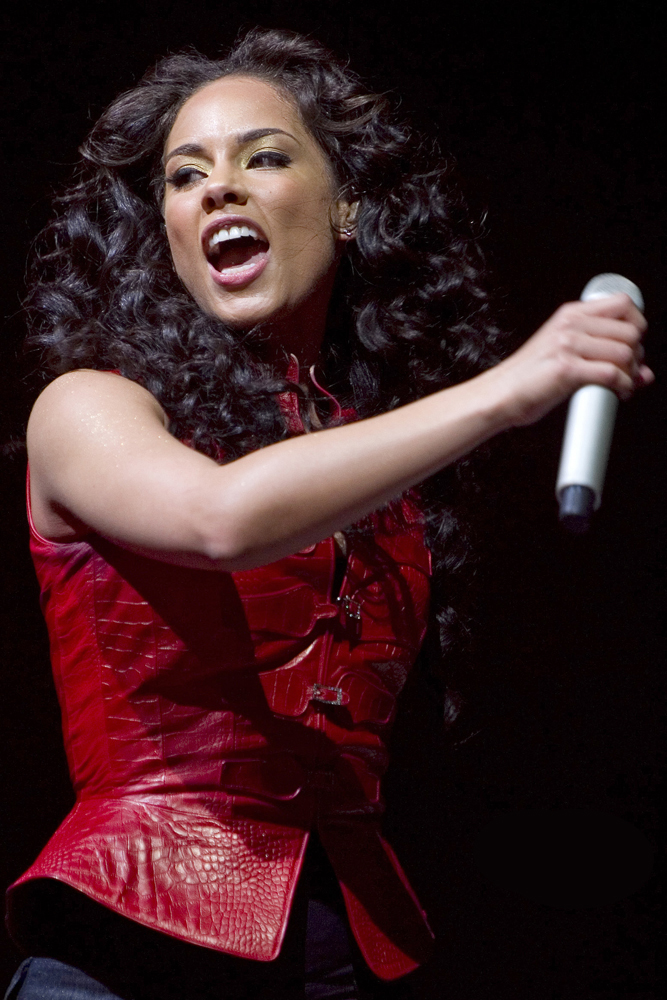
- Alicia Keys, Unplugged in 2005.
Awards and nominations
Award	Wins	Nominations
Grammy	4	6
Latin Grammy Awards	13	9

Totals (Note: Certain award groups do not simply award one winner. They acknowledge several different recipients, have runners-up, and have third place. Since this is a specific recognition and is different from losing an award, runner-up mentions are considered wins in this award tally. For simplification and to avoid errors, each award in this list has been presumed to have had a prior nomination.)
- Wins: 15
- Nominations: 15

=== Won ===
- 1993 – 35th Grammy Awards to Eric Clapton
  - Grammy Award for Album of the Year – Unplugged
- 1995 – 37th Grammy Awards to Tony Bennett
  - Grammy Award for Album of the Year – MTV Unplugged: Tony Bennett
- 1996 – 38th Grammy Awards to Nirvana
  - Best Alternative Music Album – MTV Unplugged in New York
- 2000 – Latin Grammy Awards of 2000 to Shakira
  - Best Female Rock Vocal Performance – "Octavo Día"
  - Best Female Pop Vocal Performance – "Ojos Así"
- 2000 – Latin Grammy Awards of 2000 to Os Paralamas do Sucesso
  - Best Brazilian Rock Album – Acústico MTV
- 2001 – 43rd Grammy Awards to Shakira
  - Best Latin Pop Album – Unplugged
- 2002 – Latin Grammy Awards of 2002 to Cássia Eller
  - Best Brazilian Rock Album – Acústico MTV
- 2007 – Latin Grammy Awards of 2007 to Ricky Martin
  - Best Pop Vocal Album, Male – "Unplugged"
  - Best Long Form Music Video – "Unplugged"
- 2007 – Latin Grammy Awards of 2007 to Lobão
  - Best Brazilian Rock Album – Acústico MTV
- 2007 – Latin Grammy Awards of 2007 to Lenine
  - Best Brazilian Contemporary Pop Album – Acústico MTV
- 2007 – Latin Grammy Awards of 2007 to Zeca Pagodinho
  - Best Album Samba/Pagode – Acústico MTV – 2 Gafieira
- 2008 – Latin Grammy Awards of 2008 to Julieta Venegas
  - Best Alternative Album – "Unplugged"
  - Best Long Form Music Video – "Unplugged"
- 2008 – Latin Grammy Awards of 2008 to Paulinho da Viola
  - Best Album Samba/Pagode – Acústico MTV

=== Nominations ===
- 2000 – 42nd Grammy Awards to Maná
  - Best Latin Pop Album – Unplugged
- 2000 – Latin Grammy Awards of 2000 to Shakira
  - Album of the Year – Unplugged
  - Best Pop Vocal Album – Unplugged
  - Best Short Form Music Video – "Ojos Así"
- 2003 – 45th Grammy Awards to Lauryn Hill
  - Best Female Rap Solo Performance – "Mystery of Iniquity"
- 2003 – Latin Grammy Awards of 2003 to Kid Abelha
  - Best Brazilian Contemporary Pop Album – Acústico MTV
- 2006 – 48th Grammy Awards to Alicia Keys
  - Best R&B Album – Unplugged
  - Best Female R&B Vocal Performance – "Unbreakable"
  - Best R&B Song – "Unbreakable"
  - Best Traditional R&B Vocal Performance – "If I Was Your Woman"
- 2007 – Latin Grammy Awards of 2008 to Ricky Martin
  - Album of the Year – Unplugged
  - Record of the Year – "Tu Recuerdo"
- 2008 – Latin Grammy Awards of 2008 to Julieta Venegas
  - Record of the Year – "El Presente"
  - Song of the Year – "El Presente"
