= Acústico MTV =

Musical television program aired by MTV Brasil

- Country of origin: Brazil

Production
- Running time: 60 minutes

Original release
- Network: MTV Brasil; MTV
- Release: 1991 – 2023

Acústico MTV was a music television program broadcast by MTV Brasil, inspired by the MTV Unplugged series — a North American show created in 1989 in which bands and artists perform their songs in acoustic versions, that is, using acoustic rather than electric instruments.

Initially, Acústico MTV began as a television program and subsequently became a music label. For the Brazilian recording industry, the series propelled the music market to its peak.

With the end of Grupo Abril's management of MTV Brasil in September 2013, the network ceased production of the program; consequently, the final Acústico MTV session featured Arnaldo Antunes. However, in November 2018, Viacom (the current rights holder for MTV Brasil) announced the project's return as part of a strategy to reposition MTV in Brazil.

== History ==
Acústico MTV: Barão Vermelho was the first official Acústico MTV program (the previous show, by Marcelo Nova in 1990, served merely as a "pilot" and was never broadcast or released as an album). Although Acústico MTV: Barão Vermelho was not released on CD at the time, it saw its first commercial release in 2006 as part of the MTV Barão Vermelho DVD box set.

João Bosco's Acústico (1992) was the first to be released on both LP and CD, despite having been recorded after the shows by Marcelo Nova and Barão Vermelho. The CD edition does not feature the MTV logo on the cover, and — along with Marcelo Nova's show — it was one of the only ones not released in video format.

The series made history in terms of CD sales and the release of new hits. The first to surpass the 1-million-sales mark was Acústico MTV: Titãs, with 1.7 million copies sold—a figure surpassed only by Acústico MTV: Kid Abelha, which reached two million copies in Brazil.

The simplest of all the MTV Unplugged sessions was Acústico MTV: Legião Urbana, which featured only two acoustic guitars and percussion, without any elaborate set design. In contrast, the most expensive one was Acústico MTV: Art Popular.

The project was put on hold in 2007 following the release of the Acústico MTV album by samba artist Paulinho da Viola, and was revived in 2010 — to mark MTV Brasil's 20th anniversary — with Lulu Santos's second Acústico MTV album. Furthermore, responsibility for releases on CD, DVD, Blu-ray, or any other format shifted to the artist's record label rather than the broadcaster.

With the end of Grupo Abril's management of MTV Brasil in September 2013, the channel shifted to a cable-only format and had ceased production of the program back in 2012; consequently, the final Acústico MTV session featured Arnaldo Antunes. However, in November 2018, Viacom (the current rights holder for MTV Brasil) announced the project's return as part of a strategy to reposition MTV in Brazil.

In August and September 2009, MTV Brasil aired all the Acústico MTV specials recorded between 1994 and 2007. The specials were rebroadcast again in August and September 2013 due to the station ceasing its free-to-air broadcasts.

In 2005, the compilation album O Melhor do Acústico MTV was released through Sony BMG. Subsequently, the second volume, O Melhor do Acústico MTV 2, was released by Universal Music.

== Episodes and albums released ==
#	Recorded	Released	Artist	Main article	Sales	Certifications
1	1990	Unreleased	Marcelo Nova	Acústico MTV: Marcelo Nova (never aired)		
2	1991	2006 (DVD only)	Barão Vermelho	Acústico MTV: Barão Vermelho		
3	1992	1992	João Bosco	Acústico MTV: João Bosco		
4	1992	1999	Legião Urbana	Acústico MTV: Legião Urbana	900.000 +	ABPD: Diamond
5	1994	1994	Gilberto Gil	Acústico MTV: Gilberto Gil		
6	1995	1995	Moraes Moreira	Acústico MTV: Moraes Moreira		
7	1997	1997	Titãs	Acústico MTV: Titãs	1.800.000 +	ABPD: Diamond + 2× Platinum + 2× Gold
8	1997	1997	Gal Costa	Acústico MTV: Gal Costa	500.000 +	ABPD: Diamond
9	1998	1998	Rita Lee	Acústico MTV: Rita Lee	350.000 (CD) 250.000 (DVD)	ABPD: Platinum (CD/DVD)
10	1999	1999	Os Paralamas do Sucesso	Acústico MTV: Os Paralamas do Sucesso	400.000 +	ABPD: Gold
11	2000	2000	Capital Inicial	Acústico MTV: Capital Inicial		ABPD: 3× Platinum
12	2000	2000	Art Popular	Acústico MTV: Art Popular		
13	2000	2000	Lulu Santos	Acústico MTV: Lulu Santos	900.000 +	ABPD: 3× Platinum + Gold
14	2001	2001	Cássia Eller	Acústico MTV: Cássia Eller	900.000 +	ABPD: Diamond
15	2001	2001	Roberto Carlos	Acústico MTV: Roberto Carlos		
16	2001	2002	Cidade Negra	Acústico MTV: Cidade Negra	100.000 +	ABPD: Gold
17	2002	2002	Jorge Ben	Acústico MTV: Jorge Ben Jor		
18	2002	2002	Kid Abelha	Acústico MTV: Kid Abelha	1.250.000 +	ABPD: Diamond
19	2003	2003	Marina Lima	Acústico MTV: Marina Lima	100.000 +	ABPD: Gold
20	2003	2003	Charlie Brown Jr.	Acústico MTV: Charlie Brown Jr.	600.000 +	ABPD: Platinum
21	2003	2003	Zeca Pagodinho	Acústico MTV: Zeca Pagodinho	250.000 (CD) 200.000 (DVD)	ABPD: 2× Platinum (CD) ABPD: 2× Diamond (DVD)
22	2004	2004	Ira!	Acústico MTV: Ira!	300.000 (CD/DVD)	ABPD: 2× Platinum
23	2004	2004	Marcelo D2	Acústico MTV: Marcelo D2	100.000 +	ABPD: Gold
24	2004	2004	Engenheiros do Hawaii	Acústico MTV: Engenheiros do Hawaii	100.000 +	ABPD: Gold
25	2005	2005	Bandas Gaúchas: Bidê ou Balde; Cachorro Grande; Ultramen; Wander Wildner	Acústico MTV: Bandas Gaúchas		
26	2005	2005	O Rappa	Acústico MTV: O Rappa		
27	2005	2005	Ultraje a Rigor	Acústico MTV: Ultraje a Rigor	100.000 +	ABPD: Gold
28	2006	2006	Lenine	Acústico MTV: Lenine		
29	2006	2006	Zeca Pagodinho	Acústico MTV: Zeca Pagodinho 2 - Gafieira	200.000 (CD) 100.000 (DVD)	ABPD: 2× Platinum (CD/DVD)
30	2006	2007	Lobão	Acústico MTV: Lobão	30.000 +	
31	2007	2007	Sandy & Junior	Acústico MTV: Sandy & Junior	200.000 + (CD) 100.000 + (DVD)	ABPD: 2× Platinum (CD) ABPD: Platinum (DVD)
32	2007	2007	Paulinho da Viola	Acústico MTV: Paulinho da Viola		
33	2010	2010	Lulu Santos	Acústico MTV: Lulu Santos II	ABPD: 25.000	
34	2011	2012	Arnaldo Antunes	Acústico MTV: Arnaldo Antunes		
35	2019	2019	Tiago Iorc	Acústico MTV: Tiago Iorc	Digital download only	Digital download only
36	2022	2023	Manu Gavassi	Acústico MTV: Manu Gavassi canta Fruto Proibido	Digital download only	Digital download only

== See also ==
- Acústico (disambiguation)
