= 2007 MTV Video Music Brazil =

Award ceremony

- Date: 27 September 2007
- Location: Credicard Hall, São Paulo, São Paulo
- Country: Brazil
- Hosted by: Daniella Cicarelli
- Most awards: NX Zero and Pitty (2 each)
- Most nominations: Cachorro Grande and Pitty (3 each)

Television/radio coverage
- Network: MTV Brasil

The 2007 MTV Video Music Brazil was held on 27 September 2007, at the Credicard Hall in São Paulo. The ceremony was hosted by Daniella Cicarelli.

== Winners and nominees ==
The nominees were announced on 6 August 2007. Winners are listed first and highlighted in bold.

Video of the Year	Artist of the Year
**Pitty – "Na Sua Estante" (Director: Sérgio Filho)**; Autoramas – "Mundo Moderno" (Director: Kirk Hendry); Cachorro Grande – "Você Me Faz Continuar" (Director: Ricardo Spencer); Cansei de Ser Sexy – "Alala" (Director: Cat Stolen); Charlie Brown Jr. – "Não Viva em Vão" (Director: Beto Oliveira); Ira! – "Eu Vou Tentar" (Director : Selton Mello); Mukeka Di Rato – "Rinha de Magnata" (Director: Cadu Macedo); MV Bill – "Língua de Tamanduá" (Director: Iuri Bastos); Sandrão – "Respeito Oriental" (Directors: Reinaldo Tragone, Renato Kbieger and Christiano Leal); Skank – "Seus Passos" (Director: Conrado Almada)	**NX Zero**; Cachorro Grande; Capital Inicial; Charlie Brown Jr.; CPM 22; Marcelo D2; Jota Quest; Lobão; Pitty; Skank
New Artist	MTV Bet
**Fresno**; Bonde do Rolê; Céu; Mariana Aydar; Moptop	**Strike**; Cueio Limão; Pública; Vanguart; Zefirina Bomba
International Artist of the Year	Hit of the Year
**Red Hot Chili Peppers**; Amy Winehouse; Arctic Monkeys; Britney Spears; Fall Out Boy; Fergie; Justin Timberlake; Lily Allen; My Chemical Romance; Panic! at the Disco; The White Stripes	**NX Zero – "Razões e Emoções"**; Capital Inicial – "Eu Nunca Disse Adeus"; CPM 22 – "Além de Nós"; Natiruts – "Natiruts Reggae Power"; Pitty – "Na Sua Estante"
Web Hit	Show of the Year
**"Vai Tomar no Cu"**; "As Árvores Somos Nozes"; "Guilherme Zaiden"; "Funk da Menina Pastora"; "Suplicy canta Racionais"	**Cachorro Grande**; Los Hermanos; Mutantes; Nação Zumbi; Nando Reis and os Infernais
Dream Band	Video You Made
**Pitty (vocals)**; **Fabrizio Martinelli (guitar)**; **Champignon (bass)**; **Ricardo Japinha (drums)**	**Gabriel Alves – "Na Sua Estante"**
