= MTV ao Vivo =

MTV ao Vivo (Portuguese for "MTV Live") may refer to:

- MTV ao Vivo (Nando Reis e Os Infernais album), 2004
- MTV ao Vivo (Skank album), 2001
- MTV ao Vivo (Titãs album), 2005
- MTV ao Vivo: Bailão do Ruivão, an album by Nando Reis e Os Infernais, 2009
- MTV ao Vivo – Eletrodoméstico, an album by Daniela Mercury, 2003
- MTV ao Vivo, an album by Marcelo Camelo, 2010
- MTV ao Vivo, an album by Planet Hemp, 2001

== See also ==
- List of MTV series albums
- MTV Live (disambiguation)
