= MTV Live =

MTV Live may refer to:

== Television ==
- MTV Live (TV network), an American music cable network known as Palladia from 2008 until early 2016 and Music: High Definition (MHD) from 2006 to 2008
- MTV Live (international TV channel), a series of international networks mainly carrying music videos and live music programming
- MTV Live (American TV program), a daily MTV series carried from 1997 until 1998 and one of two forerunner shows to Total Request Live
- MTV Live (Canadian TV program), a talk show, on air from 2006 to 2012

== See also ==
- List of MTV series albums
- MTV Ao Vivo (disambiguation)
