= Ritchie (vocalist) =

British-Brazilian singer-songwriter (born 1952)

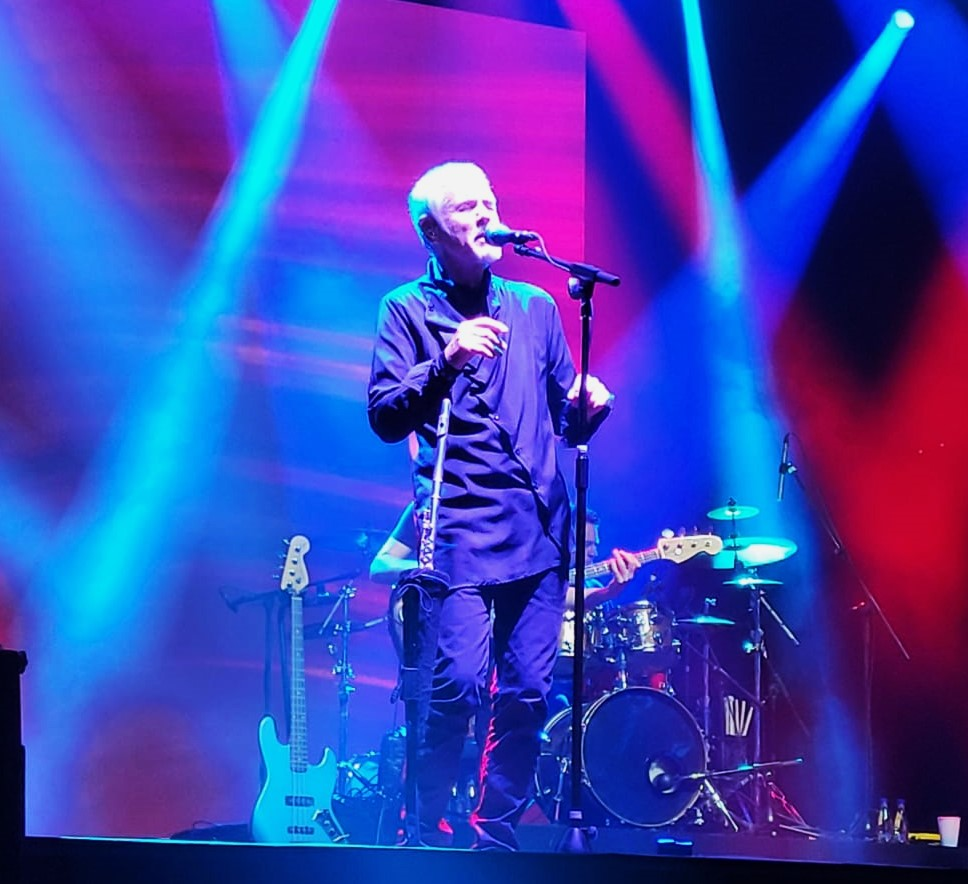
- Ritchie performing at Arena Jockey, Rio de Janeiro (2023).

Background information
- Born: March 6, 1952 (age 74); Beckenham, England, U.K.
- Genres: Pop rock; rock music; new wave; MPB
- Occupations: Singer; musician; composer; dancer
- Instruments: Vocals; flute; guitar; keyboards; percussion
- Years active: 1972–present
- Labels: Epic Records; Philips Records; Deckdisc; PopSongs; Biscoito Fino
- Website: www.ritchie.com.br

Richard David Court (born 6 March 1952 in Beckenham), known professionally as Ritchie, is a British-born Brazilian singer-songwriter, musician, composer, dancer and multi-instrumentalist.

== Biography ==
Ritchie was born in England and spent his early childhood there before moving to Brazil during his youth. After settling in Brazil, he developed an interest in music and pursued formal musical education, studying classical flute.

Prior to achieving commercial success as a solo artist, Ritchie was active in Brazil’s music scene, collaborating with other musicians and participating in various projects. His academic training and early professional experiences contributed to the development of his musical style and facilitated his integration into Brazilian popular music, where he would later become associated with the pop and rock movements of the late 1970s and early 1980s.

Ritchie authored several hits such as "Menina Veneno", "A Vida Tem Dessas Coisas", "Pelo Interfone", "Casanova", and "Vôo de Coração". His voice has been part of telenovela soundtracks, such as Champagne ("Casanova"), A Favorita ("Fala"), or Roque Santeiro ("Coisas do Coração").

In the 1990s he was part of the band Tigres de Bengala, alongside Claudio Zoli, Vinicius Cantuaria and other musicians.

== Personal life ==
Ritchie is currently married to Leda Zuccarelli. He has two daughters (Lynn and Mary) and a grandson, Pedro.

== Discography ==
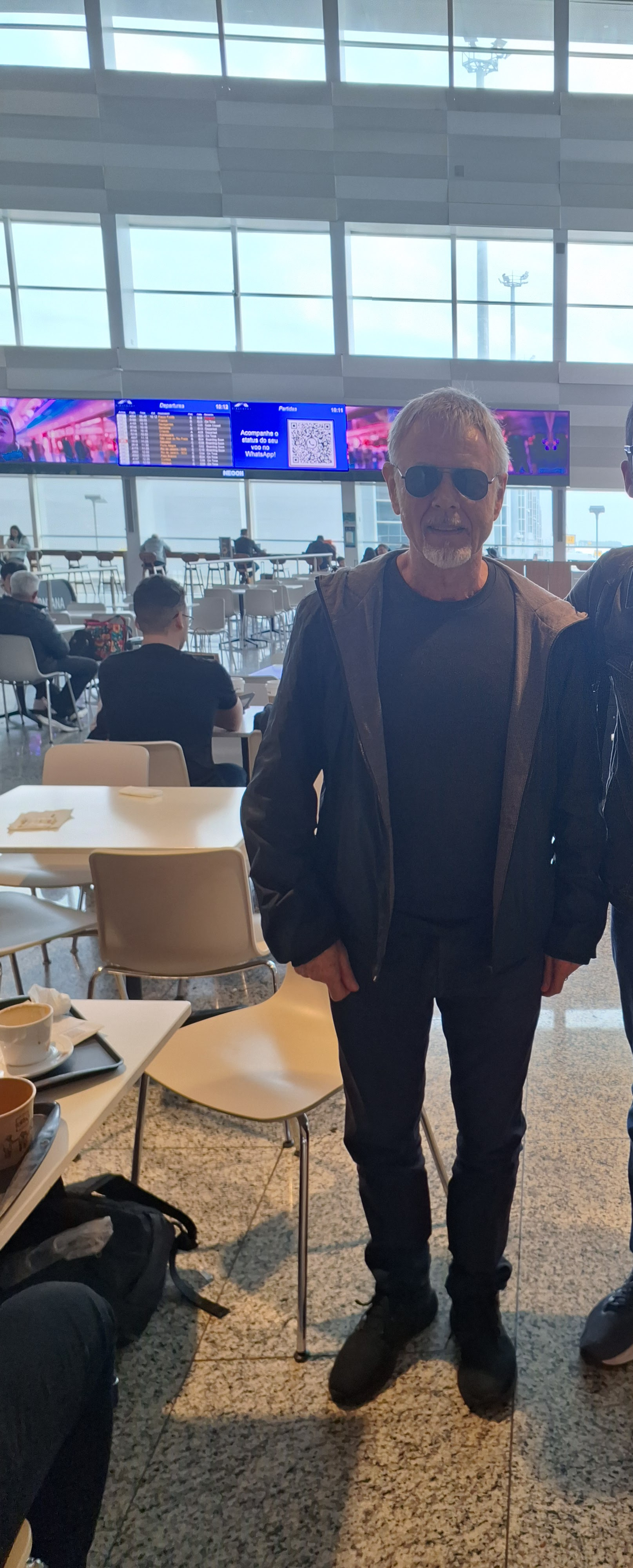
Ritchie in 2025.

=== Albums ===
- 1983 - Vôo de Coração (ft. Steve Hackett)
- 1984 - E a Vida Continua
- 1985 - Circular
- 1987 - Loucura e Mágica (ft. Steve Hackett)
- 1988 - Pra Ficar Contigo
- 1990 - Sexto Sentido
- 1993 - Tigres de Bengala
- 2002 - Auto-Fidelidade
- 2009 - Outra Vez
- 2012 - 60
- 2016 - Old Friends: The Songs of Paul Simon
- 2019 - Wild World: The Songs of Cat Stevens

=== Singles ===
- 1983 - Vôo de Coração
- 1983 - Menina Veneno
- 1983 - Casanova
- 1983 - A Vida Tem Dessas Coisas
- 1983 - Parabéns Pra Você
- 1983 - Preço do Praçer
- 1984 - E A Vida Continua
- 1984 - A Mulher Invisivel
- 1984 - So Pra O Vento
- 1985 - Telenoticias
- 1985 - Favela Music
- 1985 - Nenhum Lugar
- 1987 - Loucura e Mágica
- 1987 - Transas
- 1988 - A Sombra da Partida
- 1990 - Mais Você
- 1995 - Um Homem em Volta do Mundo
- 2002 - Jardins de Guerra
- 2002 - Lágrimas Demais
- 2009 - Outra Vez
- 2023 - Homem ao Mar

== Bibliography ==
- André Barcinski, Pavões Misteriosos - 1974-1983: A explosão da música pop no Brasil. São Paulo, Editora Três Estrelas, 2014. ISBN 978-85-653-3929-2
