= Bidê ou Balde =

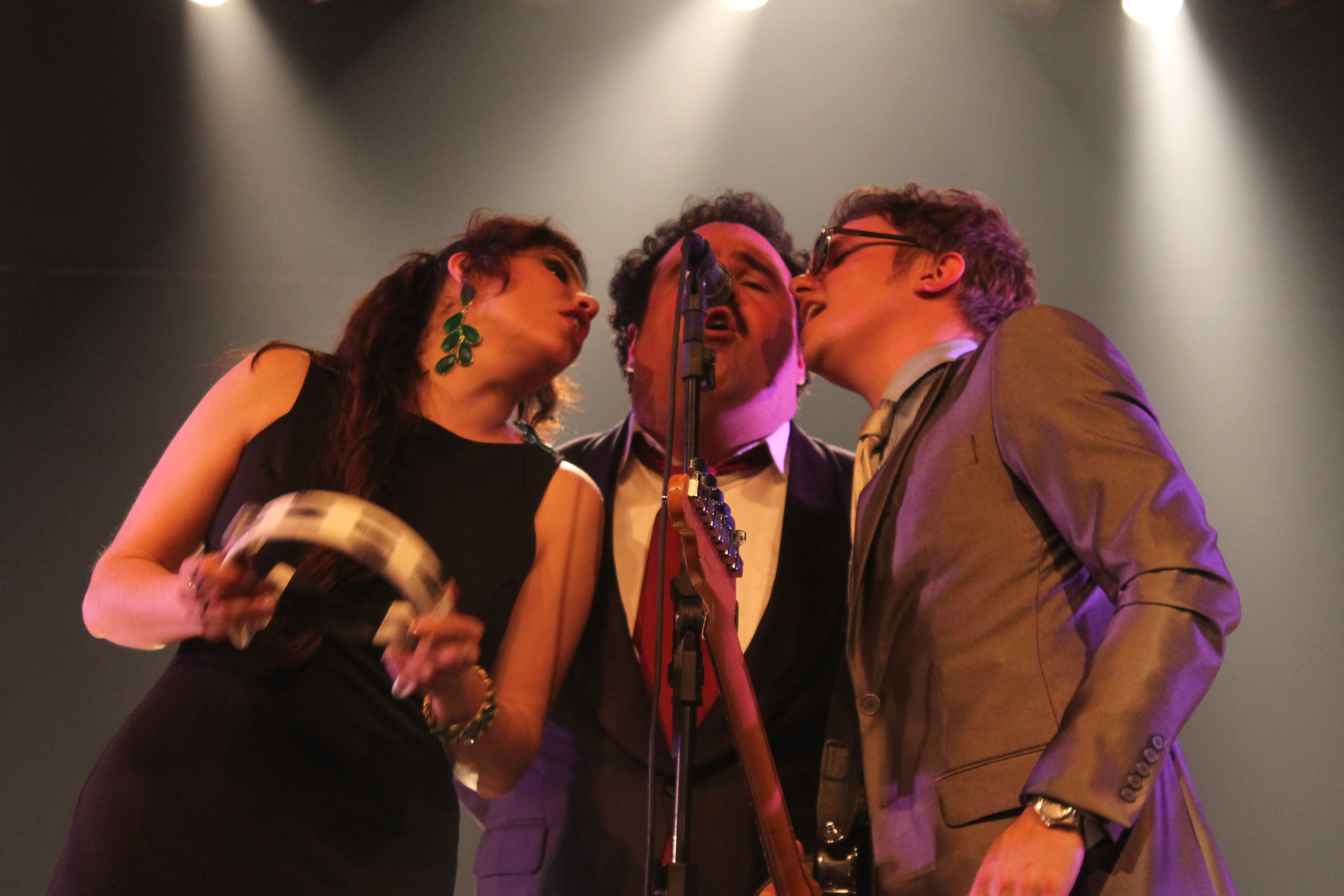

Background information
- Origin: Porto Alegre, Rio Grande do Sul, Brazil
- Genres: Rock and roll; alternative rock; indie rock; pop rock
- Years active: 1998–present
- Labels: Abril; Antídoto
- Members: Carlinhos Carneiro; Vivi Peçaibes; Leandro Sá; Rodrigo Pilla
- Past members: Katia Aguiar; Rafael Rossato; Pedro Hahn; Sandro Caveira; Gisele Figueredo; André Surkamp; Marcos Rübenich

Bidê ou Balde is a Brazilian rock band from Porto Alegre, Rio Grande do Sul. It consists of Carlinhos Carneiro (vocals), Vivi Peçaibes (vocals and keyboards), Leandro Sá (guitar and backing vocals), and Rodrigo Pilla (guitar and backing vocals).

== History ==
When asked about the origin of their name, the band gives a different answer each time. In 1999, the band released their first single, "Melissa." In 2000, they released their debut album, titled Se Sexo é o Que Importa, Só o Rock é Sobre Amor! In 2001, the band won the award for Best New Artist at the MTV Brasil Awards, finishing ahead of Falamansa.

In October 2010, after a six-year hiatus, they released new tracks: "Me deixa desafinar" and "Tudo é preza." In 2012, they released Eles São Assim. E Assim Por Diante and, to promote it, published a lyric video for the track "+Q1Amigo." A music video for the song "Lucinha" followed. In October 2015, they released Gilgongo! ou, a Última Transmissão da Rádio Ducher, featuring guest appearances by Franny Glass, Renato Borghetti, Rafuagi, Edu K, Pedro Dom, and Plato Divorak, as well as a music video for the song "Lucinha".

On the last two albums released by Bidê ou Balde, the band pays tribute to one of its major literary influences: the American writer Kurt Vonnegut, author of books such as Slaughterhouse-Five and Breakfast of Champions.

== Discography ==
=== Studio albums ===
- Se Sexo é o Que Importa, Só o Rock é Sobre Amor! (2000)
- Outubro ou Nada (2002)
- É Preciso Dar Vazão aos Sentimentos (2004)
- Eles São Assim. E Assim Por Diante (2012)
- Gilgongo! ou, a Última Transmissão da Rádio Ducher (2015)

=== Live/video albums ===
- Acústico MTV: Bandas Gaúchas (2005) (with Cachorro Grande, Ultramen and Wander Wildner)
