= Acústico MTV: Lobão =

Acústico MTV

Live album by Lobão
- Released: May 2007
- Recorded: December 7–8, 2006
- Venue: MTV Brasil
- Genre: Rock acoustic
- Length: 71:03
- Label: Sony BMG
- Producer: Carlos Eduardo Miranda

Lobão chronology
Canções Dentro da Noite Escura (2005)	Acústico MTV (2007)	Lobão Elétrico Lino, Sexy & Brutal (2011)

Acústico MTV is the third live album by Brazilian rocker Lobão, from the MTV Unplugged series. The album was recorded live on December 7 and 8, 2006, at MTV Brasil and released on CD and DVD in May 2007. This album won the Latin Grammy Award for Best Portuguese Language Rock or Alternative Album in 2007.

== Background ==
After a series of disagreements with the Brazilian recording industry, Lobão began to release records independently. As he said in an interview with the newspaper O Estado de S. Paulo, the recording of an album in the Acústico MTV series marked the musician's return to the mainstream media. In an interview with Luiz Cezar Pimentel of Rolling Stone magazine, he said: "People keep saying: ‘Independent Lobão is what counts’. I have to defend my heritage. Independent is the shit! I'm free. And I'm independent. Even to go into a record company and say: ‘I'm going to do this and this’."

The album covers all stages of Lobão's career, from compositions with partners such as Júlio Barroso and Bernardo Vilhena, to more recent partnerships with Ivo Meirelles. Released on the Sony BMG label and produced by Carlos Eduardo Miranda, the album also featured the band Cachorro Grande.

== Tracks ==
CD Track Listing
No.	Title	Writer(s)	Notes	Length
1.	"El Desdichado II"	Lobão		4:24
2.	"Essa Noite Não (Marcha a Ré em Paquetá)"	Lobão, Bernardo Vilhena, Daniele Daumerie, Ivo Meirelles		3:17
3.	"Decadence Avec Élegance"	Lobão		3:25
4.	"Bambina"	Lobão, Alice, Baster Barros, Bernardo Vilhena		3:53
5.	"Vou Te Levar"	Lobão, Bernardo Vilhena		3:45
6.	"Quente"	Lobão, Júlio Barroso		3:24
7.	"Por Tudo Que For"	Lobão, Bernardo Vilhena		3:23
8.	"Noite e Dia"	Lobão, Júlio Barroso		2:58
9.	"Me Chama"	Lobão		3:39
10.	"Você E A Noite Escura"	Lobão		4:01
11.	"A Queda"	Lobão		4:35
12.	"A Vida É Doce"	Lobão		5:00
13.	"Pra Onde Você Vai"	Lobão		4:13
14.	"O Mistério"	Lobão		3:00
15.	"Canos Silenciosos"	Lobão, Bernardo Vilhena		4:19
16.	"Blá, Blá, Blá... Eu Te Amo (Rádio Blá)"	Arnaldo Brandão, Lobão, Tavinho Paes		3:39
17.	"Corações Psicodélicos"	Lobão, Bernardo Vilhena, Júlio Barroso		4:06
18.	"A Gente Vai Se Amar"	Lobão	with Cachorro Grande	2:42
Total length:				71:03

DVD Track Listing
No.	Title	Writer(s)	Notes	Length
1.	"El Desdichado II"	Lobão
2.	"Essa Noite Não (Marcha a Ré em Paquetá)"	Lobão, Bernardo Vilhena, Daniele Daumerie, Ivo Meirelles
3.	"Decadence Avec Élegance"	Lobão
4.	"Bambina"	Lobão, Bernardo Vilhena
5.	"Revanche"
6.	"Vou Te Levar"	Lobão, Bernardo Vilhena
7.	"Quente"	Lobão, Júlio Barroso
8.	"Por Tudo Que For"	Lobão, Bernardo Vilhena
9.	"Chorando no Campo"	Lobão, Bernardo Vilhena
10.	"Que Língua Falo Eu"	Lobão, Rodrigo, Tavinho Paes
11.	"Noite e Dia"	Lobão, Júlio Barroso
12.	"Me Chama"	Lobão
13.	"Você E A Noite Escura"	Lobão
14.	"A Queda"	Lobão
15.	"A Vida É Doce"	Lobão
16.	"Pra Onde Você Vai"	Lobão
17.	"O Mistério"	Lobão
18.	"Canos Silenciosos"	Lobão, Bernardo Vilhena
19.	"Blá, Blá, Blá... Eu Te Amo (Rádio Blá)"	Arnaldo Brandão, Lobão, Tavinho Paes
20.	"Corações Psicodélicos"	Lobão, Bernardo Vilhena, Júlio Barroso
21.	"A Gente Vai Se Amar"	Lobão	with Cachorro Grande

== Release ==
The album was shown on April 15, 2007 by MTV Brasil. Only the following year, in May 2007, was the album released on CD and DVD.

== Reception ==
=== Sales ===
Despite the good reviews, the album sold only 23,000 copies. Previously, the worst result for an album in the Acústico MTV series had been 350,000 copies.

=== Critical ===
Ivan Finotti, for the Folha de S.Paulo newspaper, described the album as “great”, calling it ‘surprising’ and praised the choice of the last track - A Gente Vai Se Amar - which shows an “optimistic” Lobão. Ricardo Seelig, for the rock portal Whiplash.net, he rated the album 8 out of 10 and added that “The national pop scene is better when a restless and challenging artist like Lobão is in the spotlight in the mainstream media.”

=== Tour ===
After the album's release, Lobão began a tour, playing in cities such as Rio de Janeiro and São Paulo.

=== Prizes ===
The album was nominated for a Latin Grammy in the category of Best Portuguese Language Rock or Alternative Album. At a ceremony held at the Mandalay Bay Events Center in Las Vegas, Nevada, Lobão's album was the winner of the night in its category.

Year	Prize	Local	Category	Result	Ref.
2007	Latin Grammy Awards	Mandalay Bay Events Center, Las Vegas, Nevada, United States	Best Portuguese Language Rock or Alternative Album	Won	

== Personnel ==
=== Musicians ===
- Lobão – lead vocals, acoustic guitar, 12-string guitar, 12-string craviola
- Eduardo Bologna – dobro, banjo, acoustic guitar, mandolin, baritone guitar
- Luciano Mauricio "Luce" – acoustic guitar, 12-string guitar, mandolin, craviola, backing vocals
- Daniel Martins – acoustic bass, craviola
- Roberto Pollo – piano, Hammond organ, harmonium, melodica
- Pedro Garcia – drums, percussion (on Quente)
- Stephane San Juan – percussion

=== Orchestra ===
- Glauco Fernandes – violin
- Rogério Rosa – violin
- Luis Audi – viola
- David Chew – cello
- Claudio Alves – double bass
