= MTV Unplugged: Live (DMA's album) =

2019 live album by DMA's

Live album by DMA's
- Released: 12 July 2019
- Recorded: 11 October 2018
- Studio: Memo Music Hall, Melbourne, Australia
- Label: I OH YOU

DMA's chronology
For Now (2018)	MTV Unplugged: Live (2019)	The Glow (2020)

MTV Unplugged: Live is the first live album by Australian indie rock band DMA's. The album was recorded on 11 October 2018 at Memo Music Hall, Melbourne, aired on MTV Australia in November 2018 and was released in July 2019. The album peaked at number 94 in Australia and 65 in the United Kingdom.

== Reception ==
Deborah Jacobs from Indie is Not a Genre said "The unplugged performance does justice to the songs but is particularly refreshing on some of their newer material, such as 'The End' or 'Emily Whyte'. While the production on the original versions was rather electronic and perhaps not to everyone's liking, these songs shine thanks to the unplugged instrumentation." They concluded saying "The album's highlights are 'Step Up the Morphine', their signature single 'Delete' as well as a cover of Madonna's 'Beautiful Stranger', which fits the 90s setting perfectly. While DMA's continuously play larger venues and more prominent festival slots, MTV Unplugged Live shows that they’re equally suited for intimate acoustic performances."

Camilla Whitfield from Aah Magazine said "With longer intros and outros, it's an album which doesn't have to be constricted by radio play. For example 'Do I Need You Now' is 4 mins longer, and allows the band to mix it up, and add violin instrumentals where they otherwise wouldn't be able to. It makes the album raw and full of emotion pushing their boundaries and produces something which is guaranteed to be a fan favourite for years to come."

== Track listing ==
Adapted from Apple Music.

MTV Unplugged: Live track listing
No.	Title	Writer(s)	Length
1.	"Feels Like 37"		4:23
2.	"Lay Down"		3:52
3.	"Time & Money"		4:12
4.	"Emily Whyte"		4:27
5.	"In the Air"		4:51
6.	"Warsaw"		3:56
7.	"Beautiful Stranger"	Madonna; William Orbit	4:04
8.	"The End"		4:45
9.	"Lazy Love"		3:40
10.	"In the Moment"		3:45
11.	"Health"		3:12
12.	"Step Up the Morphine"		3:16
13.	"Delete"		5:26
14.	"Do I Need You Now?"		8:38
Total length:			62:27

== Charts ==
Chart performance for MTV Unplugged: Live
Chart (2019)	Peak position
Australian Albums (ARIA)	94
UK Albums (OCC)	65

== See also ==
- List of artists featured on MTV Unplugged
