= Moptop (band) =

Brazilian alternative rock band

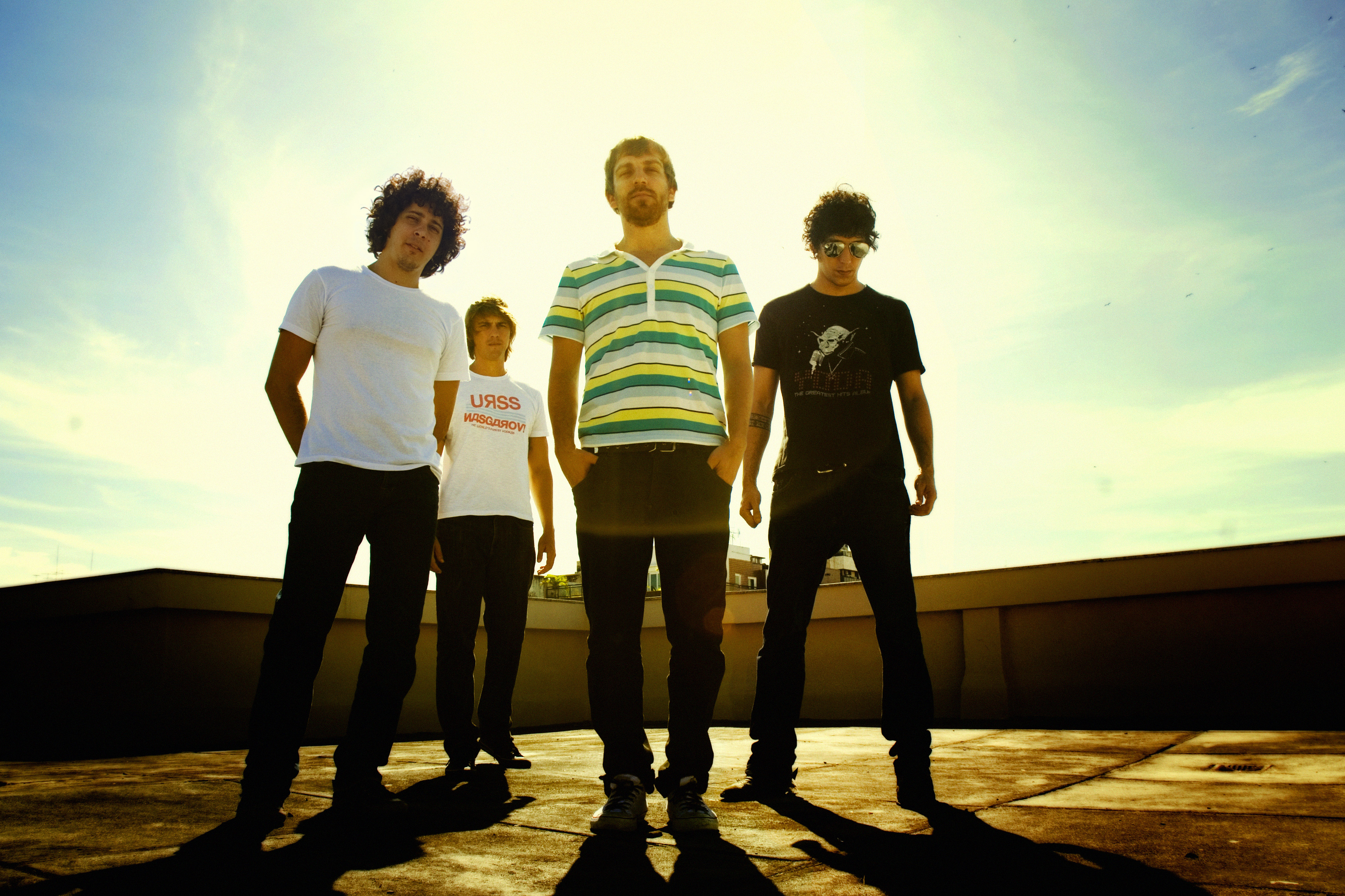
- A promotional picture of the band from 2008

Background information
- Also known as: DeLux (2003–2005)
- Origin: Rio de Janeiro, Brazil
- Genres: Alternative rock, indie rock, pop rock, pop punk
- Years active: 2003–2013, 2025–present
- Label: Universal Music Group
- Members: Gabriel Marques; Rodrigo Curi; Daniel Campos; Mário Mamede

Moptop is a Brazilian alternative rock band from Rio de Janeiro, popular throughout the mid- to late 2000s.

== History ==
Initially known as DeLux, they were formed in 2003, comprising vocalist/lead guitarist Gabriel Marques, rhythm guitarist Rodrigo Curi, bassist Daniel Campos and drummer Mário Mamede.

Strongly influenced by acts such as The Strokes (to whom they were frequently compared), The Beatles, Franz Ferdinand, Ramones and Los Hermanos, they began playing in small venues with songs in English; by the time of the release of their first demo, Moonrock, in 2005, they changed their name to "Moptop" in a reference to the famous hairstyle worn by The Beatles in the 1960s.

In 2006 they signed to Universal Music Group for the release of their debut full-length album, the self-titled Moptop, which spawned the hit singles "O Rock Acabou" and "Sempre Igual", included in the soundtrack of the 14th season of the long-running soap opera Malhação. The album's success led them to open shows by bands such as Oasis, Interpol, Faith No More, Franz Ferdinand, The Magic Numbers and The Bravery throughout the year. In 2007 they took part in a show organized by MTV Brasil alongside NX Zero, Fresno, Hateen and Forfun; a live album of the performance would be released soon after. The same year, they were nominated for the MTV Video Music Brazil award, in the "Best New Act" category (after winning it two years prior in the "Best Website" category), and also for a Multishow Brazilian Music Award in the "Revelation Artist" category.

2008 saw the release of the band's second album, Como se Comportar; produced by British producer Paul Ralphes, who previously worked with Sandy & Junior, Kid Abelha, Cidade Negra and Engenheiros do Hawaii, Gabriel Marques described its sonority as "heavily influenced by the soundtracks of Ennio Morricone and films by Quentin Tarantino", and "pushed by the rock 'n' roll spirit of Jack Kerouac". In 2009 the band announced that they began work on an extended play with songs in English, and on a third studio album, but both releases were eventually abandoned; in 2010 Marques announced that he would be putting the band on hold for an indeterminate amount of time, and in 2013 he eventually confirmed that Moptop officially ceased their activities. Drummer Mário Mamede would later form the groups Seashore Darkcave in 2014 and Herzegovina in 2017, this latter alongside former members of Planet Hemp and Polara.

As of 2020, Gabriel Marques was living in Seattle.

In April 2025 the band announced they had returned to active, with the release of the single "Last Time". Two months later, their third album and first release of new material in 17 years, Long Day, came out.

== Discography ==
- (2005) Moonrock (demo)
- (2006) Moptop
- (2008) Como se Comportar
- (2025) Long Day
