= MTV Unplugged (Florence and the Machine album) =

Live album by Florence and the Machine
- Released: 6 April 2012
- Recorded: 15 December 2011
- Venue: Angel Orensanz Center, New York City
- Length: 47:45
- Label: Island

Florence and the Machine chronology
Ceremonials (2011)	MTV Unplugged (2012)	How Big, How Blue, How Beautiful (2015)

MTV Unplugged is the second live album by English indie rock band Florence and the Machine, released on 6 April 2012 by Island Records. It was filmed on 15 December 2011 in New York City's oldest synagogue building, the Angel Orensanz Center, as part of the MTV Unplugged series, with the band being backed by a ten-person choir. The album contains acoustic performances of eleven songs, nine from the band's two studio albums, Lungs (2009) and Ceremonials (2011) alongside a cover of "Jackson" with Queens of the Stone Age's Josh Homme and "Try a Little Tenderness". Upon its release, MTV Unplugged received mixed to positive reviews by music critics.

== Background and recording ==
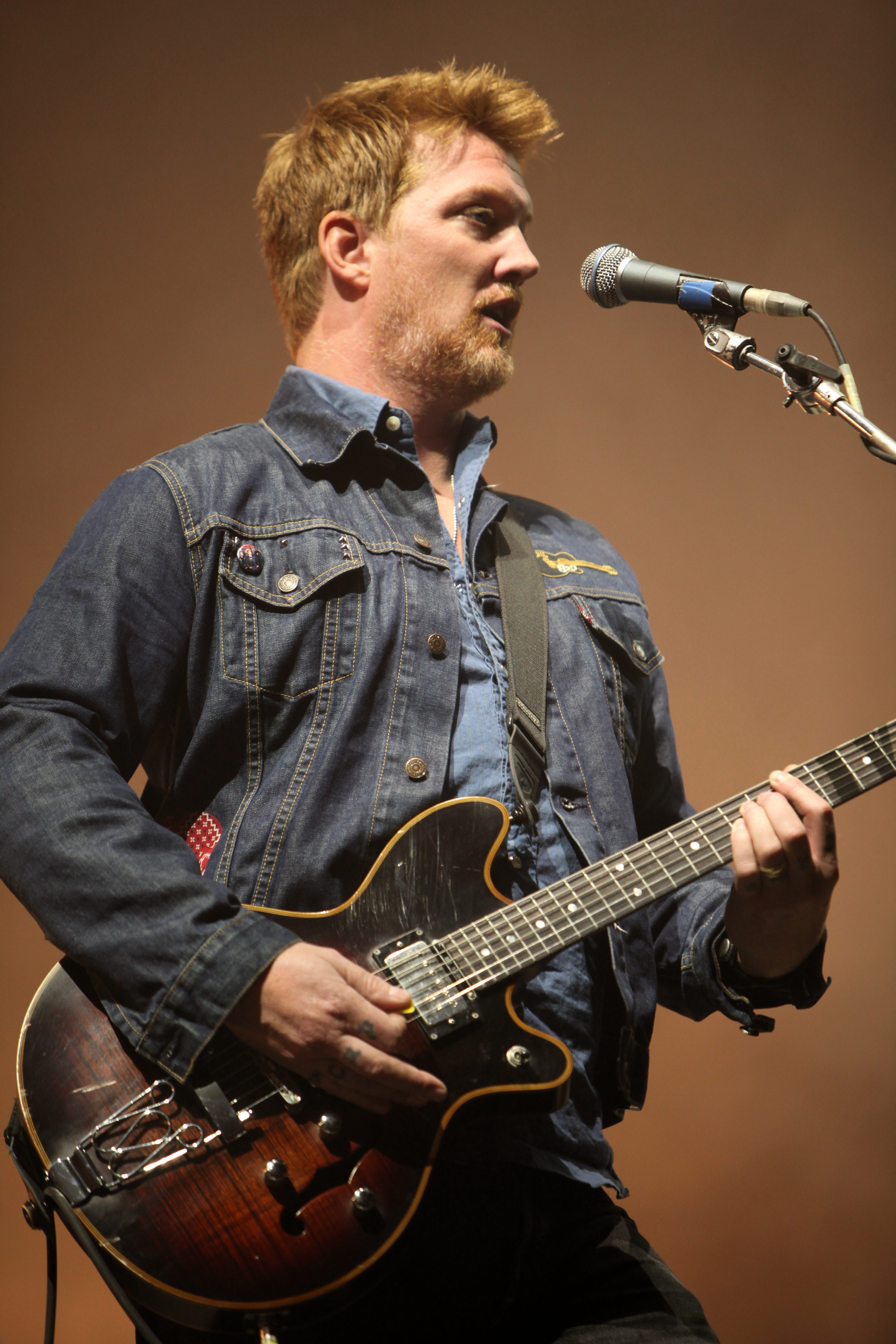
Musician Josh Homme (pictured) joined Florence Welch onstage during the cover of "Jackson" originally recorded by Johnny Cash and June Carter

In January 2012, it was announced that Florence and the Machine would be appearing on an upcoming MTV Unplugged show. MTV Unplugged was recorded in December 2011 in New York's oldest synagogue building, Angel Orensanz Center, by Florence Welch, a four-person backing band and a ten-person gospel choir, The Voices of Rivers. The performance contained eleven songs from Florence and the Machine's two studio albums, Lungs (2009) and Ceremonials (2011), performed acoustically. The band covered Otis Redding's "Try a Little Tenderness" during the show, which Florence Welch described as her favourite song. Rolling Stone's Rob Tannenbaum said that the band's cover of "Try a Little Tenderness" was "the best version" since Otis Redding's. Andy Gill of The Independent chose the cover of the song as a highlight on the show saying that Welch "nails her take" on the song.

Queens of the Stone Age's Josh Homme joined lead singer Florence Welch for another cover of "Jackson" originally recorded by Johnny Cash and June Carter. Emily Mackay of NME was positive about the cover of "Jackson" and wrote, "Where the original's sprightly skip is full of fiery humour, a lovers' tiff turned 'see if I care' bluff-off, Flo[rence] and Josh start in a more haunted manner, but it isn't long before that bitchy back and forth carries them away on a fingerpickin' country freight-train, their voices as well-matched as their hair." Rolling Stone's Matthew Perpetua chose the song as one of the highlights on the show, saying that "Homme and Welch sound amazing together". Gill of The Independent was more negative about the cover saying that it "doesn't really work". During an interview with the magazine, Welch talked about the collaboration, saying that "It was one of those things where it was like a dream scenario, and you never think that they'd say yes". She revealed that she has been a fan of Homme since she was a teenage fan of Queens of the Stone Age, but met him when his other band, Them Crooked Vultures, appeared on several festivals alongside Florence and the Machine. Welch revealed she chose "Jackson" because "it's been with me for a very long time" and because "The first song we ever recorded was a Johnny Cash cover of 'Folsom Prison' in our little studio ... It's the weirdest cover ever, this really weird soul version of 'Folsom City Blues.'"

== Development ==
"We kind of winged it. I felt really comfortable; I'm kind of in my element in that environment, when you're able to really play ... The thing I don't enjoy about TV performances is that I have to sing live to a backing track, because most times they can't afford to mic up the whole band, so you have to sing to something that's just going to keep going, with or without you. And performing in a stripped-back sense, with a band that's playing around you? It's so organic and there's so much freedom to it."

— Florence Welch, MTV News

Welch said she was "in awe" of the synagogue in which the band played on the stage decorated with candles. She further added, "I had to stop myself after every song. I would be like, 'Wow.' ... It was so amazing performing the songs stripped back and just really being able to concentrate on the songs and the emotions". During the show, Welch told the live audience: "This is a real moment for me and to be doing an 'Unplugged' session is amazing." During an interview with MTV News, she revealed, "It's such a huge thing, and it was so intimate, and I really enjoy doing things stripped back and having the strings and the choir. It was really wonderful ... But what to say in between? I got so bashful. I was so grateful to be there, and I was trying to express that, and it just went into this weird, stilted speech. It ended up with me trying to talk but not saying any words ... Singing is fine. Talking, not so much." During the interview Welch also spoke about Kanye West's guest appearance, "He was dancing and really going for it in the front row – it was amazing ... At awards shows you can't really see anyone, because there's lights and they're kind of far away, but for this, it was just like Kanye was just there. I covered 'Try a Little Tenderness,' and he'd just sampled that for the Watch the Throne album, so I was like, 'Um, hi ... you kind of got there before me, but I'm going to do this now, and it's kind of for you.' He was smiling the whole way through, and I think he's a total genius, so to have him there was really incredible." During the performance of "Breaking Down", Welch declared "This is a real moment for me ... To be doing an 'Unplugged' session is amazing.'"

== Release and broadcasting ==
The track listing of the album was announced on 6 March 2012 on Florence and the Machine's official website. The same day it was announced that the album would be available on CD, deluxe CD/DVD and as a digital download. On 9 March, the album was available for pre-order on the band's official website. The CD/DVD ordered from their official website contained an exclusive poster, only available to customers who pre-order the album through the website. On 28 March 2012, a teaser of the album was released on the band's official YouTube channel. The performance of "Cosmic Love" from the show was posted online on MTV UK on 2 April 2012. MTV Unplugged was released physically in the UK on 9 April and in the US on 10 April. It was released through the iTunes Store on 9 April and through all the other digital retailers on 10 April.

The show premiered on 8 April 2012 on MTV in Canada and the US. USA Today's Steve Jones praised Welch's "signature vocals" during the show. Glenn Gamboa of Newsday concluded that "the best way to experience their music isn't on CD. It's in concert. And thanks to MTV's ... 'Unplugged' series, Florence + The Machine took over one of New York's most beautiful concert venues ... for a perfect pairing of location and music." Over the next weeks, it was broadcast on MTV Networks across the world, including on MTV UK and Ireland on 21 April, MTV Australia and New Zealand on 2 May, MTV Music Italy on 8 May, MTV Portugal on 5 May, MTV Ukraine on 29 April, MTV Czech on 6 May, MTV MENA, Arabia on 6 April, MTV Sea on 12 May, MTV Vietnam on 29 May, MTV Taiwan on 20 May, MTV Korea on 25 May.

== Critical reception ==
Professional ratings
Aggregate scores
Source	Rating
Metacritic	66/100
Review scores
Source	Rating
AllMusic	2.5/5 stars
The Guardian	2/5 stars
The Independent	3/5 stars
NME	8/10
Pitchfork	5.9/10
PopMatters	9/10
Rolling Stone	3.5/5 stars

MTV Unplugged received mixed to positive reviews by music critics. At Metacritic, which assigns a rating out of 100 to reviews from mainstream critics, the album received an average score of 66, based on 9 reviews, which indicates "generally favorable reviews". AllMusic's James Christopher Monger graded it with two-and-a-half out of five stars, commenting "she's [Welch] come full circle, allowing fans a peek into the bombast while providing the aging, acoustic show with a little defibrillation." He further noted that midtempo songs like "Only If for a Night", "No Light, No Light" and "What the Water Gave Me", "are soulful, spooky, and bold, allowing room for both Welch and her machine to strut their stuff without sounding like a murder of caged crows." Rob Tannenbaum of Rolling Stone gave a positive review for the album saying, "While the harp, violins and choir remain delicate, Welch erupts into wild, simmering high notes, most notably on 'No Light, No Light.' Her singing is stunning; this should be credited to Florence and the Vibrato." Andy Gill of The Independent wrote in his review: "The strictures of the Unplugged format don't impact too much upon Florence & the Machine, thanks to their semi-acoustic roots, so when she opens this MTV performance with 'Only If for a Night', the piano, harp and drums are more like familiar old hands than brave new departure." He noted that "What does give the ghost story new character is the 10-piece gospel choir, which, combined with the strings, adds depth to its mystery." Gill finished his review by noting that it was "an impressive show, but not one likely to persuade doubters".

Rebecca Nicholson of The Guardian gave a mixed review for the album, writing that it placed Welch in "the middle of a bombastic conundrum". She further wrote that "the very idea of an Unplugged album places her in danger of paring it back too far, and leaving Welch's voice exposed to the elements, which are not always kind. That's exactly how this plays out ... It's hard to see who, other than her army of mini-Florence fans, will go for it, though there are the odd moments that render it not entirely pointless". Nicholson chose "What the Water Gave Me" and "Jackson" as highlights on the album but noted that "By removing the strident, strange production values of Drumming Song or Cosmic Love, for example, their original appeal is bleached out, and those not enamoured with that Welch wail will find no refuge in this state." Jordan Zivitz of The Gazette gave the album three stars and praised Welch's vocals, although he noted that "[it] is not ideal for acoustic performances".

== Commercial performance ==
MTV Unplugged debuted at number twenty-seven on the UK Albums Chart, selling 4,647 copies in its first week.

== Track listing ==
MTV Unplugged - Standard edition
No.	Title	Writer(s)	Length
1.	"Only If for a Night"	Florence Welch; Paul Epworth	5:07
2.	"Drumming Song"	Welch; James Ford; Crispin Hunt	4:43
3.	"Cosmic Love"	Welch; Isabella Summers	5:09
4.	"Breaking Down"	Welch	3:19
5.	"Never Let Me Go"	Welch; Epworth	4:34
6.	"Try a Little Tenderness"	Jimmy Campbell; Reg Connelly; Harry M. Woods	3:03
7.	"No Light, No Light"	Welch; Summers	4:12
8.	"Jackson" (featuring Josh Homme)	Billy Edd Wheeler; Jerry Leiber	3:28
9.	"What the Water Gave Me"	Welch; Francis White	4:55
10.	"Dog Days Are Over"	Welch; Summers	4:35
11.	"Shake It Out"	Welch; Epworth	4:40
Total length:			47:45

MTV Unplugged - Canadian and US iTunes edition (bonus track)
No.	Title	Length
12.	"Shake It Out" (The Weeknd Remix)	5:17

MTV Unplugged - Canadian and US deluxe edition (bonus tracks)
No.	Title	Writer(s)	Length
12.	"Landscape" (demo)	Welch; Ford	4:02
13.	"Heartlines" (acoustic)	Welch; Epworth	5:32
14.	"Shake It Out" (acoustic)	Welch; Epworth	4:12
15.	"Shake It Out" (The Weeknd Remix) (iTunes Store only)		5:16

MTV Unplugged - Deluxe edition bonus DVD
No.	Title	Length
1.	"Only If for a Night"	4:13
2.	"Drumming Song"	3:30
3.	"Breaking Down"	3:37
4.	"Never Let Me Go"	4:30
5.	"Try a Little Tenderness"	3:22
6.	"No Light, No Light"	4:17
7.	"Jackson" (featuring Josh Homme)	3:59
8.	"What the Water Gave Me"	5:02
9.	"Shake It Out"	4:49
10.	"Dog Days Are Over"	4:24
Total length:		41:43

Notes

- The CD+DVD pre-ordered from the Flotique on Florence and the Machine's official website comes with an exclusive poster, only available to customers who pre-order the album. The poster measured 480 × 360 mm and came pre-folded to 120 × 120 mm.

== Charts ==
=== Weekly charts ===
Chart (2012)	Peak position
Australian Albums (ARIA)	17
Austrian Albums (Ö3 Austria)	72
Belgian Albums (Ultratop Flanders)	6
Belgian Albums (Ultratop Wallonia)	37
Canadian Albums (Billboard)	45
Dutch Albums (Album Top 100)	55
Greek Albums (IFPI)	30
Irish Albums (IRMA)	15
New Zealand Albums (RMNZ)	27
Polish Albums (ZPAV)	5
Portuguese Albums (AFP)	10
Scottish Albums (OCC)	27
UK Albums (OCC)	27
US Billboard 200	51
US Top Alternative Albums (Billboard)	15
US Top Rock Albums (Billboard)	18
US Indie Store Album Sales (Billboard)	18

=== Year-end charts ===
Chart (2012)	Position
Polish Albums (ZPAV)	61

== Certifications ==
Region	Certification	Certified units/sales
Brazil (Pro-Música Brasil)	Gold	20,000^{‡}
Poland (ZPAV)	Gold	10,000^{*}
^{*} Sales figures based on certification alone.^{‡} Sales+streaming figures based on certification alone.

== Release history ==
Region	Date	Formats	Label
Netherlands	6 April 2012	CD, CD+DVD, digital download	Universal Music
Ireland	6 April 2012	CD, CD+DVD, digital download	Island Records
United Kingdom	9 April 2012	CD, CD+DVD, digital download	Island Records
France	9 April 2012	CD, CD+DVD, digital download	Universal Music
Italy	10 April 2012	CD, CD+DVD, digital download	Universal Music
United States	10 April 2012	CD, CD+DVD, digital download	Universal Republic Records
Australia	13 April 2012	CD, CD+DVD, digital download	Universal Music
Germany	13 April 2012	CD, CD+DVD, digital download	Universal Music
Poland	17 April 2012	CD, CD+DVD, digital download	Universal Music
Japan	20 April 2012	CD+DVD, digital download	Universal Music
