= Deckdisc =

Brazilian record label

Deckdisc is a Brazilian independent record label that was founded in 1998.

== History ==
The Deckdisc officially began his career as a record label in 1998, with distribution from Universal Music. The first success was the series "O Som do Barzinho", which reached more than two million copies sold in its five volumes. It was founded by João Augusto, a journalist and producer who was A&R at PolyGram and A&R, VP of EMI. At EMI, João Augusto worked with Mamonas Assassinas, Marisa Monte, Legião Urbana, Os Paralamas do Sucesso, Exaltasamba and many others. In 1999 Deckdisc brought back to the music scene the band Ultraje a Rigor with the launch of the album 18 Anos Sem Tirar! and in 2000 came the biggest hit of all, the launch of the debut album of Falamansa.

In November 2001, Deckdisc became the first Brazilian independent label to launch its own distribution in Rio de Janeiro.

It is also owned by Deckdisc, Editora Musical Deck that has about 6000 songs and released more than 3000 already recorded. Among its authors are big collectors copyright of Brazil, as Pitty, Eduardo Krieger, members of Falamansa, Ira!, Ultraje a Rigor, Sorriso Maroto, Dead Fish and Cachorro Grande. In 2007, Deck bought over 3000 copyrights of Abril Publishing, formerly music publishing arm of Abril Music, a defunct record label owned by Grupo Abril.

== Artists ==
- Banda Uó (tecnobrega)
- Biquini Cavadão (rock)
- Black Alien (hip hop)
- Dead Fish (rock)
- Falamansa (forró)
- Far from Alaska (rock)
- Fernanda Takai (rock)
- Grupo Revelação (pagode)
- Ira! (rock)
- Matanza (rock)
- Nação Zumbi (manguebeat)
- Perlla (pop)
- Pitty (rock)
- Ratos de Porão (crossover thrash)
- Shaman (power metal)
- Sorriso Maroto (pagode)
- Ultraje a Rigor (rock)
- Wanda Sá (bossa nova)
