= Falamansa =

Brazilian forró band

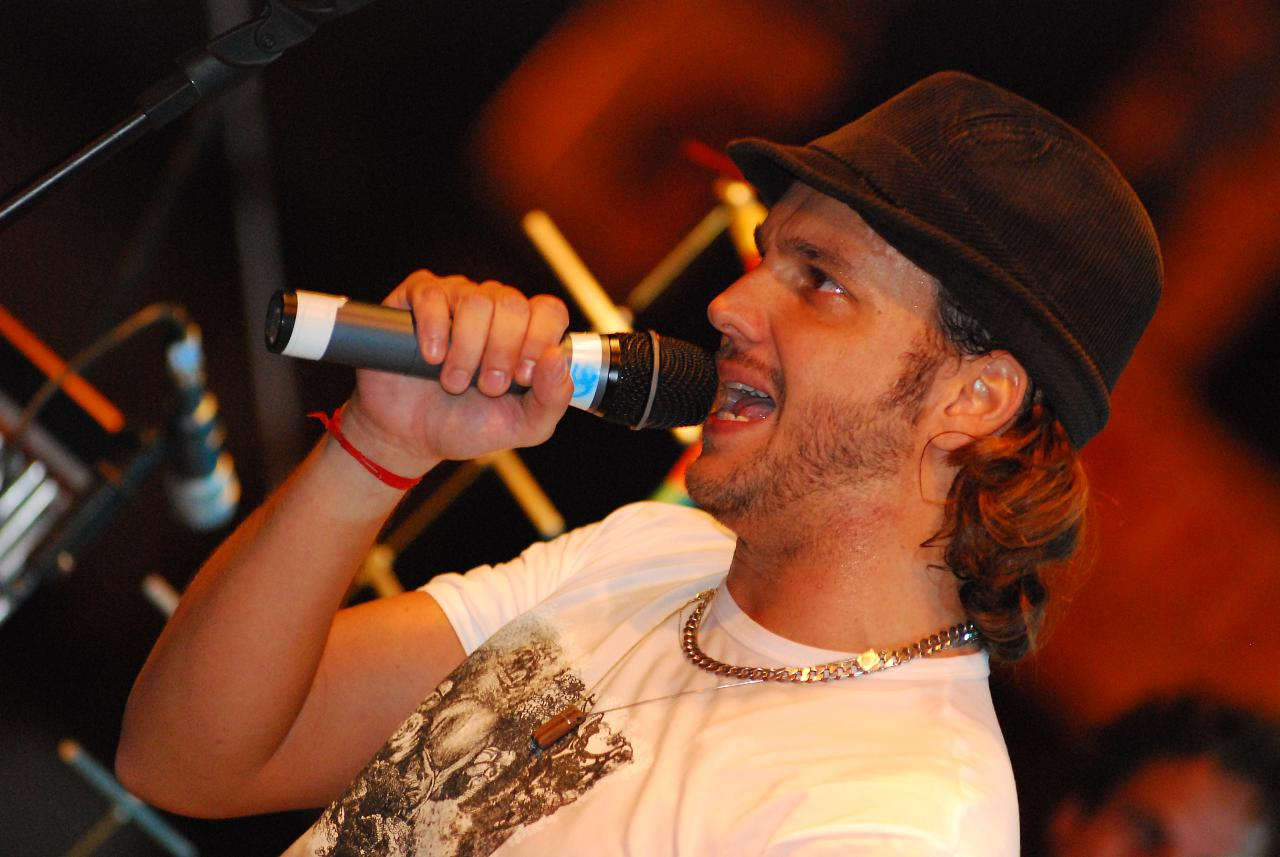
- Falamansa in 2008.

Background information
- Origin: São Paulo, São Paulo, Brazil
- Genres: Forró; Xote
- Years active: 1998–present
- Label: Deckdisc
- Members: Tato; Dezinho; Alemão; Valdir
- Website: www.falamansa.art.br

Falamansa is a Brazilian forró band created in 1998 in São Paulo. With the success of forró on the nights of the city of São Paulo, a movement emerged in the city to meet the demand of the nightclubs and the adolescent public, who identified immediately with the dance and the contagious rhythm of the style.

The members: Josivaldo, Dezinho, Tato, Alemão, and Valdir performed the songs of Luiz Gonzaga and Jackson do Pandeiro, mixing the so-called "forró universitário" or "forró pé-de-serra" with the roots of Northeastern music. By 2001, the group had more than 1 million copies sold in Brazil.

== History ==
Falamansa's history begins in 1998, the last day of registration for the 3rd Mackenzie Music Festival. Tato, now the band's author and vocalist, was a forró DJ and already had some compositions of his own. Decided to inscribe one of them ("Asas") at the festival. However, he did not have a band. Four days later Falamansa, which had not existed before, was among the 20 summons of the 160 groups enrolled in the festival. Tato remembered Alemão, a DJ friend who played zabumba. Alemão, in turn, called the neighbor, Dezinho, who played triangle.

Along with them, a flautist and a bass player who were part of the band's first lineup. They rehearsed two evenings and "Asas" won the second place in the event. Then came the experienced Josivaldo Leite, Waldir do Acordeão, who had already played with names like Oswaldinho do Acordeão and Jorge de Altinho. It was then complete the formation of the band that never changed. A Brazilian publisher called Deckdisc listened to the independent CD they recorded in January 2000 and released Deixa Entrar, distributed by Abril Music. The band started playing every Tuesday at the Remelexo house in Pinheiros, São Paulo.

They released "Essa é pra você" in 2001. In 2003, the group released the third album of their career. Simples Mortais, as it was titled, has as its flagship the song "100 Anos", which won a music video. The fourth album, "Um dia perfeito", was released in 2004, with unpublished songs like "Tempo de paz" and some re-recordings such as "Sete Meninas" by Dominguinhos, which was already part of the band's repertoire.

In 2005 the MTV CD and DVD came to stores. The material, recorded on February 19 at Via Funchal, in São Paulo, was attended by names such as Dominguinhos, in "Sete Meninas" and "Forró do Bole Bole"; Zeider, from Planta & Raiz, in "Gostas de Amor"; And the Meninos do Morumbi, in "Homem de Aço". In addition to major career successes, the compilation brings together three previously unreleased tracks, among them "Decola" and "Amor e Cia". The DVD with the record of the show brings photo gallery, making-of, interviews and a documentary about the forró universitário among the main successes are "Xote dos milagres" "Xote da alegria" and "Rindo atoa".

In 2014, the album "Amigo Velho" won the Latin Grammy for Best Brazilian Roots Album.

== Members ==
- Tato - vocals and guitar
- Alemão - zabumba
- Dezinho - triangle and percussion
- Valdir - accordion

== Albums ==
- Deixa Entrar (Deckdisc - 2000)
- Essa é pra Vocês (Deckdisc - 2001)
- Simples Mortais (Deckdisc - 2003)
- Um dia Perfeito (Deckdisc - 2004)
- MTV ao Vivo (Deckdisc - 2005)
- Segue a Vida (Independent - 2007)
- Essencial (Sony/BMG - 2008)
- 10 anos "Rindo à Toa" - Por um mundo melhor!!! (Independent - 2010)
- As Sanfonas do Rei (Deckdisc - 2012)
- Amigo Velho (Deckdisc) - 2014)
- Lá da Alma (Independent) - (2016)
