= Marina Lima =

Brazilian singer-songwriter (born 1955)

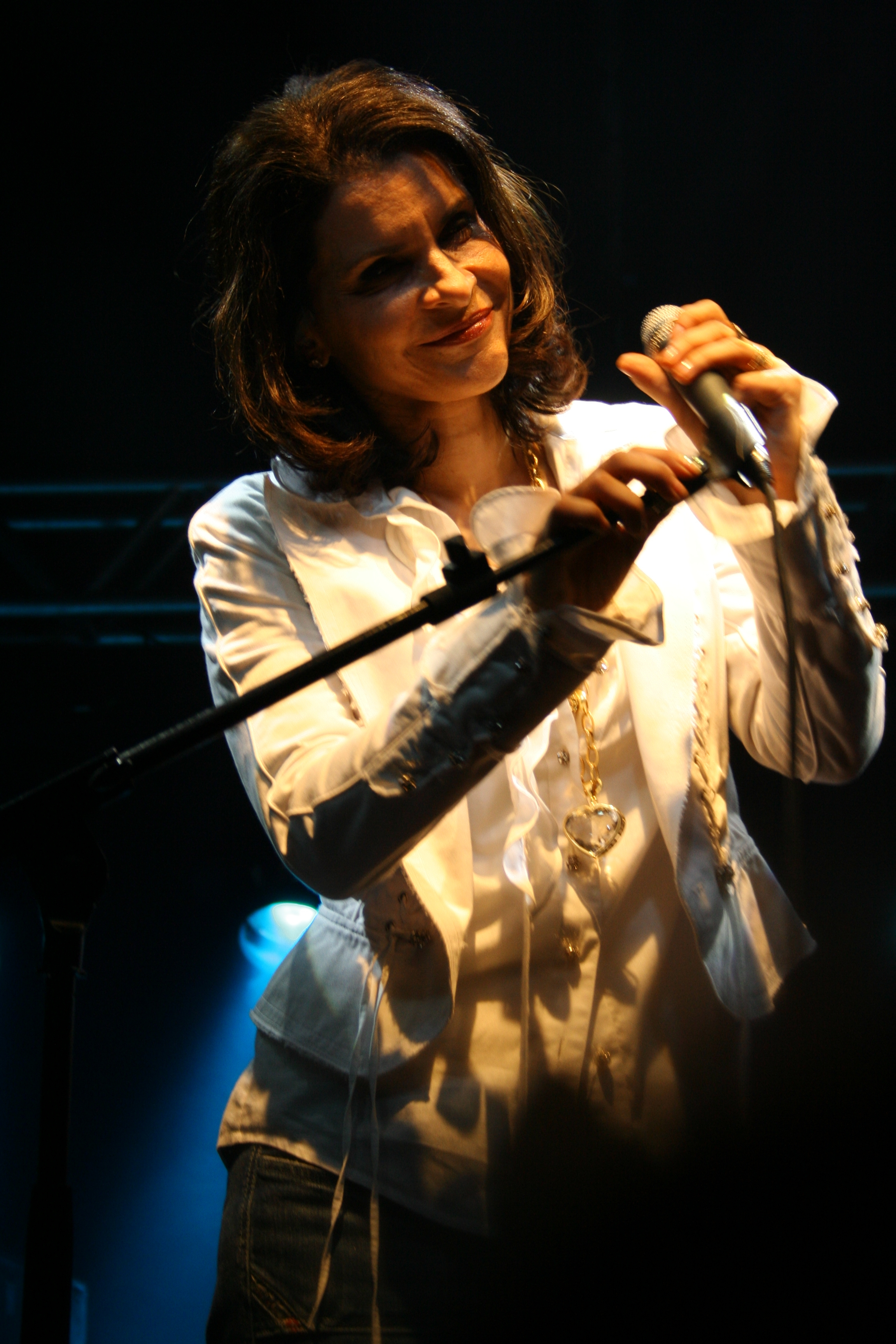
- Lima performing in Florianópolis, June 2007

Background information
- Born: September 17, 1955 (age 70)
- Works: Fullgás
- Website: Official website

Marina Correia Lima (Portuguese pronunciation: [maˈɾinɐ ˈlimɐ], born September 17, 1955) is a Brazilian singer and songwriter. She is a prominent female pioneer of Brazilian rock music.

== Career ==
Marina Lima began composing songs at the age of 17, and first achieved major success with the 1984 album Fullgás, which included the hit singles "Fullgás", "Me Chama" (written by Lobão), "Veneno" and "Mesmo que Seja Eu" (an Erasmo Carlos cover).

In 1986 she released the first home video concert by a Brazilian artist, "Todas Ao Vivo", which chronicled the tour in support of her 1985 album "Todas" and included several of her previous hits as well as backstage interviews.

In the 90s she continued recording highly praised albums such as "O Chamado” and Abrigo".

After a long break from the stage, Lima finally returned to prominence with the release of concert and live album Sissi na Sua.

In 2003 she recorded her Acústico MTV (the Brazilian equivalent of the MTV Unplugged series), which spawned two top 10 hit singles (the new track "Sugar" and a reworked version of her 1984 hit "Fullgas") and became her best selling album in over a decade. The DVD (the first of her career) was also one of the year's best sellers.

== Personal life ==
In an interview, she declared herself as bisexual.

She is related to singers Moreno Veloso (son of Caetano Veloso), Preta Gil (daughter of Gilberto Gil), Luiza Possi (daughter of Zizi Possi), Davi Moraes (son of Moraes Moreira) and actress Patrícia Pillar.

== Discography ==
Title	Details
Simples Como Fogo	Released: 1979; Label: WEA Music; Format: LP, K7
Olhos Felizes	Released: 1980; Label: Ariola Discos; Format: LP, K7
Certos Acordes	Released: 1981; Label: Ariola Discos; Format: LP, K7
Desta Vida, Desta Arte	Released: 1982; Label: Ariola Discos; Format: LP, K7
Fullgás	Released: 1984; Label: Polygram; Format: LP, K7
Todas	Released: 1985; Label: Polygram; Format: LP, K7
Todas Ao Vivo	Released: 1986; Label: Polygram; Format: LP, K7
Virgem	Released: 1987; Label: Philips; Format: LP, K7, CD
Próxima Parada	Released: 1989; Label: Universal; Format: LP, K7, CD
Marina Lima	Released: 1991; Label: EMI-Odeon; Format: LP, CD
O Chamado	Released: 1993; Label: EMI Music; Format: CD
Abrigo	Released: 1995; Label: EMI Music; Format: CD
Registros à Meia Voz	Released:1996; Label: EMI Music; Format: CD
Pierrot do Brasil	Released: 1998; Label: Polygram; Format: CD
Síssi na Sua	Released: 2000; Label: Universal; Format: CD
Setembro	Released: 2001; Label: Abril Music; Format: CD
Acústico MTV	Released: 2003; Label: EMI; Format: CD
Lá Nos Primórdios	Released: 2006; Label: EMI; Format: CD
Clímax	Released: 2011; Label: Libertà Records; Format: CD
No Osso - Ao Vivo	Released: 2015; Label: Universal; Format: CD

== DVDs ==
- 2003 Acústico MTV
