= Lobão (musician) =

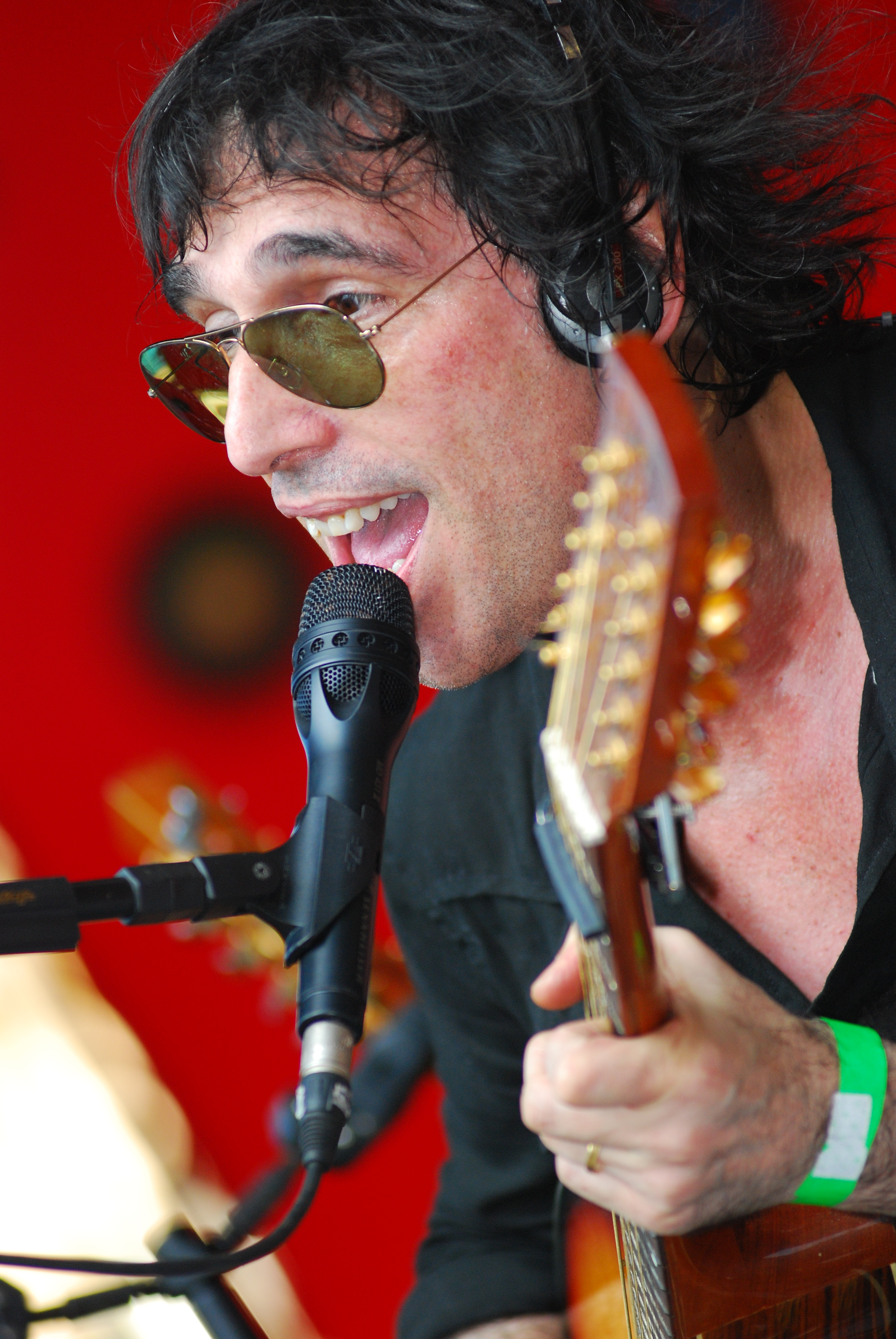
- Lobão in May 2012

Background information
- Born: João Luiz Woerdenbag Filho; October 11, 1957 (age 68); Rio de Janeiro, Brazil
- Genres: Rock, alternative rock, experimental, MPB, progressive rock (early), post-punk (early), new wave (early), samba rock (Cuidado! era)
- Occupations: Musician, songwriter, composer, writer, media personality
- Instruments: Vocals, drums, electric guitar, acoustic guitar, keyboards
- Years active: 1974–present
- Label: Virgin/EMI Records
- Website: lobao.com.br

João Luiz Woerdenbag Filho (born October 11, 1957), popularly known as Lobão ("Big Wolf", in reference to the Disney depiction of the Big Bad Wolf character), is a Brazilian singer-songwriter, composer, multi-instrumentalist, writer, publisher, television host and media personality. He is perhaps best known for his hit songs "Me Chama" ("Call Me") and "Vida Louca Vida" ("Life, Crazy Life") as well as seminal works Vida Bandida and A Vida É Doce.

Aside from his musical works, Lobão acquired a reputation for having little inhibition in expressing his opinions, as well as bluntly and publicly criticising fellow musicians, which led to a notable number of controversies and enmities. His most recent controversy was a break-up with the record industry; claiming that all major labels are conspiring to deceive their own artists (by underreporting sales and using piracy as a scapegoat), he set an independent distribution plan to sell music CDs on newsstands and through the internet. This endeavor was very successful: his independent albums sold well and were critically acclaimed.

Lobão also created a magazine, Outracoisa (literally somethingelse or anotherthing), which came bundled with a music CD of independent artists.

== Life and career ==
He was born João Luiz Woerdenbag Filho on October 11, 1957, in Rio de Janeiro to João Luiz Woerdenbag, an auto mechanic working for Rede Globo, and Ruth Araújo de Mattos, an English teacher. Lobão is of distant Dutch descent.

His career had beginnings at 17 years old, when he left his home to become a professional musician, first participating in a theater play featuring Marília Pêra then joining progressive rock band Vímana as a drummer in 1975, with yet-to-be-known figures such as Lulu Santos and Ritchie. Vímana would dissolve three years later, having a fruitless try as Patrick Moraz's backing band.

Lobão, still as a drummer, resumed his career playing with Luiz Melodia, Walter Franco and Marina Lima before forming new wave-inspired band Blitz in 1980. Blitz would be disappointing for him, and he left the band for alleged ideological reasons before its eventual commercial success. However, he decided to use Blitz's rising fame to propel his solo career. One of Brazil's most influential magazines, ISTOÉ, did an extensive feature with them and highlighted the group on its cover; with that issue and a demo tape in hand, Lobão soon signed with RCA Victor. His former bandmates scratched him off the album pictures and replaced his face with a drawing of the Big Bad Wolf in retaliation.

His solo debut came in 1982, titled Cena de Cinema. His first backing band had Marina Lima, his former Vímana bandmates Lulu Santos and Ritchie, and his Blitz bandmates Ricardo Barreto, Antônio Pedro and Billy Forghieri. Lobão only noticed that the drums were still missing 40 minutes before they had to leave the studio. He recorded the instrument in one take. The album was a commercial failure, but the label never invested in it in the first place, so it was not deemed a cost-benefit disappointment.

The early 1980s also saw Lobão briefly join Júlio Barroso's innovative ensemble Gang 90 & As Absurdettes.

Since 2013, Lobão also has recorded hangouts with Olavo de Carvalho other Brazilian conservative personalities.

== Discography ==
- Cena de Cinema (1982)
- Ronaldo foi pra Guerra (1984)
- O Rock Errou (1986)
- Vida Bandida (1987)
- Cuidado! (1988)
- Sob o Sol de Parador (1989)
- Vivo (1990)
- O Inferno é Fogo (1991)
- Nostalgia da Modernidade (1995)
- Noite (1998)
- A Vida é Doce (1999)
- 2001: Uma Odisséia no Universo Paralelo (2001)
- Canções Dentro da Noite Escura (2005)
- Acústico MTV (2007)
- Lobão Elétrico: Lino, Sexy & Brutal (Ao Vivo Em São Paulo) (2012)
