= Cachorro Grande =

Brazilian rock band

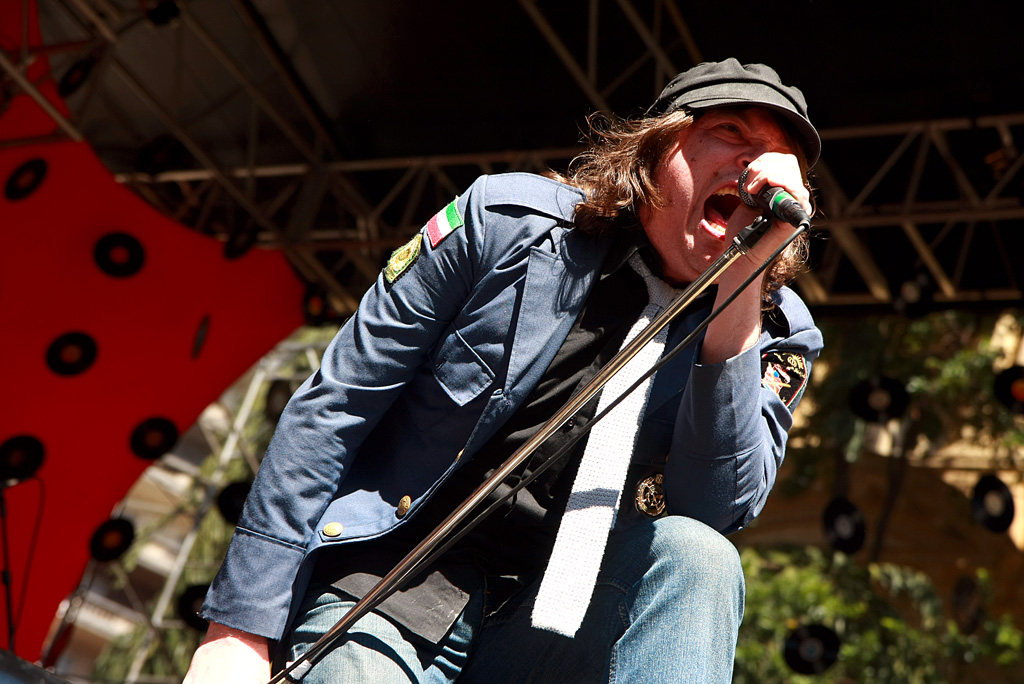
- Beto Bruno, vocalist

Background information
- Origin: Porto Alegre, Brazil
- Genres: Rock and roll, garage rock, blues rock, psychedelic rock, indie rock
- Years active: 1999–2019
- Labels: Stop, L&C, Deckdisc, Trama, Midas, Universal, Olelê, 180, Coqueiro Verde, Press Pass
- Members: Beto Bruno; Marcelo Gross; Pedro Pelotas; Gabriel Azambuja; Rodolfo Krieger
- Past members: Jerônimo Bocudo

Cachorro Grande (Portuguese for "Big Dog") was a Brazilian rock band from Porto Alegre, Rio Grande do Sul.

== Career ==
The band released its debut self-titled album in 2001 to regional acclaim. In 2003, the music video for "Lunático" was nominated for Best New Artist at the 2003 MTV Video Music Brazil. In 2007, they won the MTV Video Music Brazil for Best Live Performance.

Original bassist Jerônimo "Bocudo" left the band in 2005. He was then replaced by bassist Rodolfo Krieger. In 2018, guitarist Marcelo Gross was replaced by Gustavo X, but soon afterwards rejoined the band for their farewell tour the following year.

== History ==
=== The origin of the name ===
The name Cachorro Grande was suggested by Beto Bruno. Soon after, it had the endorsement of Marcelo Gross and the rest of the band. The origin came from the fact that, at the beginning of the band, still without their own songs, covers of bands like The Rolling Stones, The Beatles and The Who were part of the group's repertoire. To choose which songs to play, it was a "big dog fight", an expression used in Rio Grande do Sul to refer to something very complicated. So, the name of the band became Cachorro Grande.

== Discography ==
=== Studio albums ===
- (2001) Cachorro Grande
- (2004) As Próximas Horas Serão Muito Boas
- (2005) Pista Livre
- (2007) Todos os Tempos
- (2009) Cinema
- (2011) Baixo Augusta
- (2014) Costa do Marfim
- (2016) Electromod

=== Live albums ===
- (2013) Ao Vivo no Circo Voador
- (2018) Clássicos

== Singles ==
- "Sexperienced"
- "De Baixo do Meu Chapéu"
- "Lunático"
- "Dia Perfeito"
- "Hey, Amigo"
- "Que Loucura!"
- "Você Não Sabe o Que Perdeu"
- "Agora Eu Tô Bem Louco"
- "Desentoa"
- "Bom Brasileiro"
- "Sinceramente"
- "Velha Amiga"
- "Você Me Faz Continuar"
- "Conflitos Existenciais"
- "Roda-Gigante"
- "Dance Agora"
- "Difícil de Segurar"
- "Por Onde Vou"

== Influences ==
- David Bowie
- Jethro Tull
- Led Zeppelin
- Oasis
- Os Mutantes
- Supergrass
- The Beatles
- The Kinks
- The Rolling Stones
- The Who
- The Hives
- AC/DC
