= Daniela Mercury discography =

This is the discography of Brazilian Axé/MPB singer-songwriter Daniela Mercury. From 1988 to 1990, Mercury released two albums with the group Companhia Clic. In 1991, she started a solo career with the release of a self-titled album.

== Albums ==
=== Companhia Clic (1988–1990) ===
- Companhia Clic - Vol. 1 (1988)
- Companhia Clic - Vol. 2 (1989)

=== Solo career (1990–present) ===
==== Studio albums ====
Year	Album information	Certifications
Daniela Mercury (a.k.a. "Swing da Cor")	Released: 1991; Label: Eldorado	
O Canto da Cidade	Released: 1992; Label: Epic Records	PMB: Diamond
Música de Rua	Released: 1994; Label: Epic Records	PMB: 2× Platinum
Feijão com Arroz	Released: 1996; Label: Epic Records	PMB: 2× Platinum
Sol da Liberdade	Released: April 18, 2000; Label: BMG	PMB: Platinum
Sou de Qualquer Lugar	Released: September 2001; Label: BMG	PMB: Gold
Carnaval Eletrônico	Released: June 10, 2004; Label: BMG	
Balé Mulato	Released: October 2005; Label: EMI	PMB: Gold
Canibália	Released: October 24, 2009; Label: Sony BMG Music Entertainment	
Vinil Virtual	Released: November 27, 2015; Label: Biscoito Fino	

==== Live albums ====
Year	Album information	Certifications
Elétrica	Recorded: August 1998 (at Solar do Unhão, Salvador); Released: October 1998; Label: Epic Records	
MTV ao Vivo – Eletrodoméstico	Recorded: January 24 and 25, 2003 (at Teatro Castro Alves, Salvador); Released: April 22, 2003; Label: BMG	PMB: Gold
Clássica	Recorded: October 6 and 7, 2004 (at Bourbon Street, São Paulo); Released: September 27, 2005; Label: Som Livre	
Balé Mulato - Ao Vivo	Recorded: September 17, 2006 (at Farol da Barra, Salvador); Released: November 2006; Label: EMI	
Canibália: Ritmos do Brasil	Recorded: December 31, 2010 (at Copacabana (Rio de Janeiro); Released: November 25, 2011; Label: Som Livre	
O Axé, A Voz e o Violão (Ao Vivo)	Recorded: 2016 (at Castro Alves Theatre, Salvador); Released: September 9, 2016; Label: Biscoito Fino	

==== Compilations albums ====
Title	Details
Swing Tropical – Grandes Êxitos	Released: October 25, 1999; Label: Sony Music
20 Grandes Êxitos	Label: Sony Music
Vinteum – 21 Êxitos	Label: Sony Music
The Very Best – Gold	Label: BMG
O Canto da Cidade – 15 Anos	Label: Sony Music

== DVDs ==
Title	Details
MTV ao Vivo – Eletrodoméstico	Recorded: January 24 and 25, 2003 (at Teatro Castro Alves, Salvador); Released: 2003; Label: BMG
Clássica	Released: August 2005; Label: Som Livre
Baile Barroco	Released: January 2006; Label: EMI; Director: Daniel dos Santos
Balé Mulato - Ao Vivo	Recorded: September 17, 2006 (at Farol da Barra, Salvador); Released: November 2006; Label: EMI; Director: Lírio Ferreira
O Canto da Cidade - 15 Anos	Recorded: 1991–1992; Released: March 2008; Label: Sony BMG; Director: Roberto Talma
Canibália: Ritmos do Brasil	Recorded: December 31, 2010 (at Copacabana (Rio de Janeiro); Released: November 25, 2011; Label: Som Livre
O Axé, A Voz e o Violão (Ao Vivo)	Recorded: 2016 (at Castro Alves Theatre, Salvador); Released: September 9, 2016; Label: Biscoito Fino

== Other songs ==
List of other songs showing year released and album name
Title	Year	Album
"Swing da Cor" (featuring Olodum)	1991	Daniela Mercury
"Menino do Pelô" (featuring Olodum)	1991	Daniela Mercury
"O Canto da Cidade"	1992	O Canto da Cidade
"O Mais Belo dos Belos (A Verdade do Ilê/O Charme da Liberdade)"	1992	O Canto da Cidade
"Batuque"	1992	O Canto da Cidade
"Você Não Entende Nada/Cotidiano" (Incidental Song)	1993	O Canto da Cidade
"Só Pra te Mostrar" (featuring Herbert Vianna)	1993	O Canto da Cidade
"Bandidos da América"	1993	O Canto da Cidade
"Música de Rua"	1994	Música de Rua
"O Reggae e o Mar"	1994	Música de Rua
"Rosa"	1994	Música de Rua
"Por Amor Ao Ilê"	1994	Música de Rua
"À Primeira Vista	1996	Feijão com Arroz
"Nobre Vagabundo"	1997	Feijão com Arroz
"Rapunzel	1997	Feijão com Arroz
"Minas com Bahia" (featuring Samuel Rosa)	1997	Feijão com Arroz
"Feijão de Corda"	1997	Feijão com Arroz
"Trio Metal"	1998	Elétrica – Ao Vivo
"Ilê Pérola Negra"	2000	Sol da Liberdade
"Santa Helena"	2000	Sol da Liberdade
"Como Vai Você"	2000	Sol da Liberdade
"Beat Lamento"	2001	Sou de Qualquer Lugar
"Mutante"	2002	Sou de Qualquer Lugar
"Estrelas" (featuring Toni Garrido)	2002	Sou de Qualquer Lugar
"Dona da Banca"	2003	MTV ao Vivo – Eletrodoméstico
"Meu Plano"	2003	MTV ao Vivo – Eletrodoméstico
"Pára de Chorar" (featuring DJ Memê)	2003	MTV ao Vivo – Eletrodoméstico
"Maimbê Dandá" (featuring Carlinhos Brown)	2004	Carnaval Eletrônico
"Vou Batê pra tu" (featuring DJ Zé Pedro)	2004	Carnaval Eletrônico
"Aeromoça"	2005	Clássica
"Sua Estupidez"	2005	Clássica
"Olha o Gandhi Aí"	2005	Balé Mulato
"Topo do Mundo"	2005	Balé Mulato
"Levada Brasileira"	2005	Balé Mulato
"Quero a Felicidade" (featuring Jammil e Uma Noites)	2006	Balé Mulato – Ao Vivo
"Preta" (featuring Seu Jorge)	2007	Canibália
"Oyá Por Nós" (featuring Margareth Menezes)	2009	Canibália
"O Sol do Sul"	2009	Canibália
"Andarilho Encantado"	2010	non-album single
"Santana Dos Olhos D'água"	2012	non-album single
"Alma Feminina"	2013	Daniela Mercury & Cabeça de Nós Todos
"A Rainha do Axé (Rainha Má)"	2014	Vinil Virtual
"Cidade da Música"	2016	non-album single

== Guest appearances ==
List of other appearances, showing year released and album name
Title	Year	Other artist(s)	Album
"Cores do Vento"	1995	None	Pocahontas soundtrack
"Se Eu Não Te Encontrasse"	1995	None	Pocahontas soundtrack
"Alegria, Alegria"	1997	None	Tropicália – 30 anos
"Conmigo"	2007	Eumir Deodato	We All Love Ennio Morricone
"Protesto do Olodum" (E Lá Vou Eu)"	2007	Margareth Menezes; Tatau	Ó Paí, Ó soundtrack
"Touch Your Button (Carnival Jam)"	2007	Wyclef Jean will.i.am Melissa Jiménez; Machel Montano; Black Alex; Shabba; Djakout Mizik	Carnival Vol. II: Memoirs of an Immigrant

== Videography ==
List of music videos showing year released, other featured artists and directors
Title	Year	Album
"Swing da Cor" (featuring Olodum)	1991	Daniela Mercury
"O Canto da Cidade"	1992	O Canto da Cidade
"O Mais Belo dos Belos"	1992	O Canto da Cidade
"Batuque"	1992	O Canto da Cidade
"Você Não Entende Nada"	1993	O Canto da Cidade
"Só Pra te Mostrar" (featuring Herbert Vianna)	1993	O Canto da Cidade
"Música de Rua"	1994	Música de Rua
"O Reggae e o Mar"	1994	Música de Rua
"Nobre Vagabundo"	1997	Feijão com Arroz
"Rapunzel"	1997	Feijão com Arroz
"Feijão de Corda"	1997	Feijão com Arroz
"Trio Metal"	1998	Elétrica – Ao Vivo
"Ilê Pérola Negra"	2000	Sol da Liberdade
"Santa Helena"	2000	Sol da Liberdade
"Beat Lamento"	2001	Sou de Qualquer Lugar
"Mutante"	2002	Sou de Qualquer Lugar
"Dona da Banca"	2003	MTV Ao Vivo – Eletrodoméstico
"Meu Plano"	2003	MTV Ao Vivo – Eletrodoméstico
"Maimbê Dandá" (featuring Carlinhos Brown)	2004	Carnaval Eletrônico
"Aeromoça"	2005	Clássica
"Sua Estupidez"	2005	Clássica
"Topo do Mundo"	2005	Balé Mulato
"Levada Brasileira"	2005	Balé Mulato
"Quero a Felicidade" (featuring Jammil e Uma Noites)	2006	Balé Mulato – Ao Vivo
"Toneladas de Amor"	2006	Balé Mulato – Ao Vivo
"Oyá Por Nós" (featuring Margareth Menezes)	2009	Canibália
"É Carnaval"	2010	Canibália: Ritmos do Brasil
"Santana Dos Olhos D'água"	2012	Single
"Alma Feminina"	2013	Daniela Mercury & Cabeça de Nós Todos
