= O Canto da Cidade - 15 Anos =

O Canto da Cidade – 15 Anos

Box set by Daniela Mercury
- Released: March 2008
- Recorded: 1991–1992
- Genres: Axé; MPB
- Label: Sony BMG

Daniela Mercury chronology
Balé Mulato - Ao Vivo (2006)	O Canto da Cidade – 15 Anos (2008)	Canibália (2009)

O Canto da Cidade – 15 Anos is a box released in 2008 by Brazilian singer Daniela Mercury. Contains a remastered version of the CD O Canto da Cidade, originally released in 1992, and a DVD with the TV special directed by Roberto Talma which was presented by the Rede Globo in the end of the same year.

== Track listing ==
O Canto da Cidade – DVD
No.	Title	Length
1.	"O Canto da Cidade" (Live)
2.	"Toda Menina Baiana" (Live)
3.	"Você Não Entende Nada/Cotidiano" (Music Video)
4.	"Pout-Pourri do Pescador" (Jeito Faceiro/Canto ao Pescador/Canção da Partida)
5.	"Águas de Março" (Duet with Tom Jobim)
6.	"Menino do Pelô" (Live)
7.	"É D'Oxum" (Duet with Gerônimo)
8.	"Há Tempos" (Live)
9.	"Só Pra te Mostrar" (Duet with Herbert Vianna)
10.	"Crença e Fé" (Live)
11.	"O Mais Belo dos Belos (A Verdade do Ilê/O Charme da Liberdade)" (Live)
12.	"Maluco Beleza" / "Sociedade Alternativa" (Live)
13.	"Swing da Cor" (Live)

O Canto da Cidade – CD
No.	Title	Writer(s)	Length
1.	"O Canto da Cidade"	Daniela Mercury, Tote Gira	3:22
2.	"Batuque"	Rey Zulu, Genivaldo Evangelista	3:21
3.	"Você Não Entende Nada/Cotidiano"	Caetano Veloso, Chico Buarque	3:04
4.	"Bandidos da América"	Jorge Portugal	3:25
5.	"Geração Perdida"	Daniela Mercury, Ramon Cruz, Toni Augusto	4:11
6.	"Só Pra Te Mostrar" (featuring Herbert Vianna)	Herbert Vianna	3:57
7.	"O Mais Belo dos Belos (A Verdade do Ilê/O Charme da Liberdade)"	Guiguio, Valter Farias, Adailton Poesia	3:31
8.	"Rosa Negra"	Jorge Xaréu	3:21
9.	"Vem Morar Comigo"	Mercury, Durval Lelys	3:35
10.	"Exótica das Artes"	Armandinho Macedo, Edmundo Caroso	3:29
11.	"Rimas Irmãs"	Carlinhos Brown	3:42
12.	"Monumento Vivo"	Moraes Moreira, Davi Moraes	3:06
