= MTV ao Vivo – Eletrodoméstico =

MTV ao Vivo - Eletrodoméstico

Live album and Video by Daniela Mercury
- Released: April 22, 2003
- Recorded: 2003
- Genres: Pop, axé, MPB
- Length: 72:49
- Labels: Ariola, BMG, MTV Brasil
- Producers: Daniela Mercury, Nelson Motta

Daniela Mercury chronology
Sou de Qualquer Lugar (2001)	MTV ao Vivo - Eletrodoméstico (2003)	Carnaval Eletrônico (2004)

Singles from MTV ao Vivo - Eletrodoméstico
- 1. "Dona da Banca" Released: 2003; 2. "Meu Plano" Released: 2003

Professional ratings
Review scores
Source	Rating
AllMusic	2.5/5 stars

MTV ao Vivo – Eletrodoméstico is the second live album by Brazilian singer Daniela Mercury, released on April 22, 2003. It was recorded as an MTV ao Vivo special in early 2003. Two songs from the album "Dona da Banca" and "Meu Plano" were released as singles.

== Track listing ==
Eletrodoméstico – CD
No.	Title	Writer(s)	Length
1.	"Eletro-Doméstico"	Marcelo Falcão, Yuka	3:40
2.	"Temporada das Flores"	Leoni	3:41
3.	"Dona da Banca"	Aleh, Pacifico	4:04
4.	"Ive Brussel" (featuring Jovanotti)	Ben, Jovanotti	4:39
5.	"Baby"	Veloso	4:35
6.	"Meu Plano"	Falcão, Lenine	3:32
7.	"À Primeira Vista"	César	3:48
8.	"To Remember" (featuring Carlinhos Brown)	Antunes, Brown	4:15
9.	"Riqueza" (featuring Rosario Flores)	Brown, Diez	4:32
10.	"It Ain't Over till It's Over"	Kravitz	3:23
11.	"Milagre Do Povo" (featuring Dulce Pontes)	Veloso	4:18
12.	"Nossa Gente (Avisa Lá)"	Carvalho	3:09
13.	"Umbigo Do Mundo (L'Ombelico del Mondo)"	Celani, Centoze, Cherubini, Foschi, Nelson Motta	3:18
14.	"Ilê Pérola Negra (O Canto Do Negro)"	Guiguio, Miltão, Veneno	5:38
15.	"Mutante"	De Carvalho, Lee	3:53
16.	"Nobre Vagabundo"	Mello	4:26
17.	"Só Pra te Mostrar"	Vianna	3:31
18.	"Pára de Chorar" (Bonus Track)	Garrido, Mercury, Motta, Peixe	4:18

Eletrodoméstico – DVD
No.	Title	Writer(s)	Length
1.	"Eletro-doméstico"	Falcão, Yuka	5:19
2.	"Mutante"	Lee, De Carvalho	3:52
3.	"Temporada das Flores"	Leoni	3:41
4.	"A Praieira"	Chico Science	3:48
5.	"Nobre Vagabundo"	Márcio Mello	4:26
6.	"Ive Brussel" (featuring Jovanotti)	Jorge Ben Jor / versão em italiano: Jovanotti	4:39
7.	"Minas com Bahia"	Chico Amaral	3:34
8.	"Você Não Entende Nada/Cotidiano"	Caetano Veloso, Chico Buarque	4:16
9.	"Dona da Banca"	Pacífico, Aleh	4:04
10.	"Meu Plano"	Lenine, Dudu Falcão	3:31
11.	"Baby"	Veloso	4:35
12.	"À Primeira Vista"	César	3:47
13.	"Só Pra te Mostrar"	Vianna	3:31
14.	"To Remember" (featuring Carlinhos Brown)	Brown, Antunes	4:18
15.	"It Ain't Over 'Til It's Over"	Kravitz	3:23
16.	"Nossa Gente (Avisa Lá)"	Carvalho	3:09
17.	"Milagre do Povo" (featuring Dulce Pontes)	Veloso	4:18
18.	"O Mais Belo dos Belos (A Verdade do Ilê/O Charme da Liberdade)/Por Amor ao Ilê"	Guiguio, Adailton Poesia, Valter Farias	6:21
19.	"Riqueza (Tour)" (featuring Rosario Flores)	Brown / Spanish version: Brown, Diez	4:32
20.	"Ilê Pérola Negra (O Canto do Negro)"	Miltão, Renê Veneno, Guiguio	5:40
21.	"Umbigo do Mundo (L'Ombelico del Mondo)"	L. Cherubini, P. Foschi, M. Centoze, S. Celani / versão em português: Nelson Motta	3:18
22.	"Swing da Cor" (featuring Olodum)	Luciano Gomes	3:55
23.	"Rapunzel"	Brown, Tavares	3:48
24.	"Trio Metal"	Moura, Mercury, Renan Ribeiro, Marcelo Porciúncula	4:20
25.	"O Canto da Cidade"	Mercury, Tote Gira	4:16
