= Baile Barroco =

Live album and Video by Daniela Mercury
- Released: 2006
- Recorded: January 5, 6, 7 and 8, 2005
- Genres: Axé, MPB
- Label: EMI

Daniela Mercury chronology
Balé Mulato (2005)	Baile Barroco (2006)	Balé Mulato - Ao Vivo (2006)

Baile Barroco is the second video album by Brazilian singer Daniela Mercury, released in 2006 by the EMI label. It was recorded during Mercury parade on the carnival of Salvador on January 5, 6, 7 and 8, 2005. Released previously only in DVD, but it was available in download audio on music stores and streaming platforms.

== Track listing ==
1. "Baianidade Nagô"
2. "Trio Metal"
3. "Prefixo de Verão"
4. "Maimbê Dandá"
5. "Pot-Pourri Olodum"
6. "Vamos Fugir" (featuring Gilberto Gil)
7. "Meu Pai Oxalá
8. "Olha o Gandhi Ai
9. "Força Do Ilê"
10. "Ilê Pérola Negra"
11. "Aquarela do Brasil" (Incidental song: "Na Baixa do Sapateiro") (featuring Ricardo Castro)
12. "Axé Axé" (Incidental song: "Chão da Praça")
13. "Fricote" (featuring Luiz Caldas)
14. "Rapunzel"
15. "Chame Gente"
16. "O Canto da Cidade" (featuring Ricardo Castro)
17. "O Trenzinho do Caipira" (featuring Ricardo Castro)
18. "Prelúdio Nº2 BWV 847 em Dó Menor Do Cravo Bem Temperado" (featuring Ricardo Castro)
19. "Aria - Cantilena" (N.1 das Bachianas Brasileiras Nº5) (featuring Ricardo Castro)
20. "Expresso 222"/"Eu Só Quero Um Xodó"/"Asa Branca" (featuring Ricardo Castro)
21. "Pot-Pourri Trio Eletrônico" (featuring Ramiro Musotto, Fernanda Porto e Kaleidoscópio)
