= Elétrica =

Live album by Daniela Mercury
- Released: October 1998
- Recorded: August 22, 1998
- Genre: Axé, MPB
- Length: 63:12
- Label: Epic (Sony Music)
- Producer: Alfredo Moura

Daniela Mercury chronology
Feijão com Arroz (1996)	Elétrica (1998)	Sol da Liberdade (2000)

Singles from Elétrica
- 1. "Trio Metal" Released: 1998

Elétrica (Portuguese for "Electric") is the first live album (fifth overall) by Brazilian singer-songwriter Daniela Mercury, released in October 1998 through Epic Records (her last with that label). It was certified Platinum in Brazil for over 400,000 copies sold. The album were recorded during a concert on August 22, 1998, on Solar do Unhão, in Salvador. Parte dos direitos autorais do álbum foram doados à UNICEF.

Professional ratings
Review scores
Source	Rating
Allmusic	link

== Track listing ==
No.	Title	Writer(s)	Length
1.	"Elétrica"	Daniela Mercury
2.	"Swing da Cor"	Luciano Gomes
3.	"O Canto da Cidade"	Mercury, Tote Gira
4.	"Salve-se Quem Puder"	Ramon Cruz
5.	"Abraço"	Mercury
6.	"Música de Rua"	Mercury, Pierre Onasis
7.	"Terra Festeira"	Alain Tavares, Gilson Babilônia
8.	"Feijão de Corda"	Cruz
9.	"Vulcão da Liberdade/Faraó, Divindade do Egito/Uma História de Ifá (Elegibô)/Madagascar Olodum"	Tonho Matéria/Gomes/Ytthamar Tropicália, Rey Zulu/Zulu
10.	"Tua Lua"	Mercury, Alfredo Moura
11.	"O Mais Belo dos Belos/Por Amor ao Ilê"	Guiguio, Adailton Poesia, Valter Farias
12.	"Você Não Entende Nada/Cotidiano"	Caetano Veloso/Chico Buarque
13.	"Trio Metal"	Moura, Mercury, Renan Ribeiro, Marcelo Porciúncula
14.	"O Reggae e o Mar/Venha Me Amar/Batuque"	Zulu, Mercury/Genivaldo Evangelista
15.	"Rapunzel"	Carlinhos Brown, Tavares
16.	"Toda Menina Baiana"	Gilberto Gil

== Chart performance ==
World (1998)	Peak
Portugal (AFP)	2

== Certification and sales ==
Region	Certification
Portugal (AFP)	Platinum
