= Balé Mulato – Ao Vivo =

Balé Mulato - Ao Vivo

Live album and Video by Daniela Mercury
- Released: December 2006
- Recorded: September 17, 2006, at Farol da Barra, Salvador, Bahia
- Genres: Axé, MPB
- Length: 59:07
- Label: Canto da Cidade / Páginas do Mar (EMI)

Daniela Mercury chronology
Baile Barroco (2006)	Balé Mulato - Ao Vivo (2006)	O Canto da Cidade - 15 Anos (2008)

Singles from Balé Mulato - Ao Vivo
- 1. "Quero a Felicidade" Released: 2006

Balé Mulato – Ao Vivo is Daniela Mercury's fourth live album, released in Brazil in December 2006 through EMI. The tracks of this album (with the exception of the last two) were recorded on September 17, 2006 in Farol da Barra, Salvador, Bahia. It won a Latin Grammy Award in 2007 and sold around 60 000 copies in Brazil, earning a gold certification.

== Track listing ==
Balé Mulato - Ao Vivo – CD
No.	Title	Writer(s)	Length
1.	"Levada Brasileira"	Pierre Onasis, Edilson	3:30
2.	"Olha o Gandhi Aí"	Tonho Matéria, Jo Vieira	3:47
3.	"Baianidade Nagô"	Evany	3:31
4.	"Prefixo de Verão"	Beto Silva	2:37
5.	"Toneladas de Amor" (featuring Márcio Mello)	Márcio Mello	4:04
6.	"Topo do Mundo"	Jauperi, Gigi	3:11
7.	"Dia Branco"	Geraldo Azevedo, Renato Rocha	4:11
8.	"Não Chores Mais (No Woman, No Cry)"	Vincent Ford / Portuguese version: Gilberto Gil	6:58
9.	"Amor de Ninguém (O Amor)"	Jorge Papapa	3:50
10.	"Ilê Ayê (Que Bloco É Esse)"	Paulinho Camafeu	6:29
11.	"Água do Céu" (featuring Gil)	Daniela Mercury, Jorge Zarath	3:39
12.	"Maimbê Dandá"	Carlinhos Brown, Mateus	6:24
13.	"Quero a Felicidade" (featuring Jammil e Uma Noites)	Mercury, Manno Góes	3:27
14.	"Essa Ternura (A Certain Softness)"	Paul McCartney / Portuguese version: César Lemos	3:29

Balé Mulato - Ao Vivo – DVD
No.	Title	Writer(s)	Length
1.	"Aquarela do Brasil (Opening)"	Ary Barroso	2:44
2.	"Levada Brasileira"	Pierre Onasis, Edilson	3:17
3.	"Meu Pai Oxalá"	Vinícius de Morais, Toquinho	3:17
4.	"Olha o Gandhi Aí"	Tonho Matéria, Jo Vieira	3:47
5.	"Nobre Vagabundo"	Márcio Mello	7:19
6.	"Baianidade Nagô"	Evany	3:31
7.	"Prefixo de Verão"	Beto Silva	2:37
8.	"Só No Balanço do Mar"	Lenine, Dudu Falcão	4:00
9.	"Feijão de Corda"	Ramon Cruz	3:50
10.	"Toneladas de Amor" (featuring Márcio Mello)	Márcio Mello	4:04
11.	"Topo do Mundo"	Jauperi, Gigi	3:11
12.	"Pensar Em Você"	Chico César	3:37
13.	"Dia Branco"	Geraldo Azevedo, Renato Rocha	4:11
14.	"Amor de Ninguém (O Amor)"	Jorge Papapa	3:50
15.	"Você Não Entende Nada/Cotidiano"	Caetano Veloso/Chico Buarque	5:07
16.	"Ciranda das Panelas (Instrumental)"		3:16
17.	"Ilê Ayê (Que Bloco É Esse)"	Paulinho Camafeu	6:29
18.	"Dona Canô" (featuring Banda Didá and Mariene de Castro)	Neguinho do Samba	5:26
19.	"Balé Popular" (featuring Banda Didá)	Onassis, Edilson	4:30
20.	"Não Chores Mais (No Woman, No Cry)"	Vincent Ford / Portuguese version: Gilberto Gil	6:58
21.	"Ilê Pérola Negra"	Miltão, Renê Veneno, Guiguio	5:40
22.	"Água do Céu" (featuring Gil)	Daniela Mercury, Jorge Zarath	3:39
23.	"Maimbê Dandá"	Carlinhos Brown, Mateus	6:24

== Charts ==
Year	Song	Chart
Year	Song	Brazil
2006	"Quero a Felicidade"	56

== Awards ==
On November 8, 2007, Balé Mulato - Ao Vivo won a Latin Grammy Award for Best Brazilian Roots/Regional Album.

== Certification ==
Region	Certification	Certified units/sales
Brazil (Pro-Música Brasil) for the DVD	Gold	25,000^{*}
^{*} Sales figures based on certification alone.
