= Sergio Krakowski =

Brazilian pandeiro musician (born 1979)

Sérgio Krakowski
- Born: Sérgio Krakowski Costa Rego; December 18, 1979 (age 46); Rio de Janeiro, Brazil
- Genre: Samba
- Instrument: Pandeiro
- Years active: 2001–present
- Label: Rocinante

Sérgio Krakowski Costa Rego (born 18 December 1979) is a Brazilian musician best known for his work as a pandeiro player. His career is characterized by the integration of Brazilian musical traditions with experimental approaches and technological innovation.

== Early life ==
Sérgio Krakowski Costa Rego was born on 18 December 1979 in Rio de Janeiro. He is the nephew of artists Fayga Ostrower and Anna Bella Geiger. He began playing the pandeiro at the age of 15 as a self-taught musician and, by 18, was participating in choro circles in the Lapa neighborhood of Rio de Janeiro.

In parallel with his musical activity, Krakowski pursued an academic career in mathematics and computer music. He earned a bachelor's degree in pure mathematics and a master's degree in applied mathematics at the Federal University of Rio de Janeiro (UFRJ), followed by a doctorate in musical computing at the National Institute for Pure and Applied Mathematics (IMPA) in 2009, with part of his research conducted in Paris. His doctoral thesis explored rhythm as an interface between musicians and computers, leading to the development of interactive systems that enabled the pandeiro to control sound processing and video projections.

== Career ==
Krakowski began performing professionally in 2001 as a member of the choro group Tira Poeira, contributing to the genre's early-2000s renewal and appearing on the albums Brasileirinho (2003) and Feijoada Completa (2008). With the group, he performed at events such as the TIM Festival and participated in a Projeto Pixinguinha tour. During this period he collaborated live or in studio with artists including Maria Bethânia, Beth Carvalho, Lenine, Zélia Duncan, Olivia Hime, Francis Hime, Bnegão, and Hamilton de Holanda. He also joined the samba group Anjos da Lua, which led weekly dances at the Clube dos Democráticos in Rio de Janeiro. From 2002 to 2004 he participated in the CEASM educational project in the Maré favela, where he integrated musical practice into mathematics instruction, and beginning in 2005 he conducted pandeiro workshops in several European and South American countries.

In the 2010s, he developed the project Choro Funk with DJ Sany Pitbull, resulting in the album Telecotekno Funk: O Chorofunk da Lapa (2010), which combined choro and funk carioca. The project incorporated video elements triggered by pandeiro interactions developed from his doctoral research. In 2013 he released the independent album Carrossel de Pássaros, recorded in Brazil, Portugal, France, and Italy with contributions from both Brazilian and international musicians. In 2016 he released Pássaros: The Foundation of the Island on Ruweh Records, an album derived from Carrossel de Pássaros. Recorded with Todd Neufeld on electric guitar and Vitor Gonçalves on piano, the album linked choro structures with rhythmic investigations involving Cuban batá cycles. Krakowski later developed Carimbó Multi-Mídia in Belém in 2018, merging Amazonian carimbó traditions with contemporary jazz and multimedia performance.

In 2019 he recorded the album Mascarada in New York with the Sérgio Krakowski Trio and Jards Macalé, released in January 2024 by the label Rocinante. The project emerged from the trio's free reinterpretations of samba repertory, which led to a focus on the work of Zé Keti. Macalé, who had worked with Kéti since the 1960s, was invited for his improvisational and nonconformist musical approach. G1 journalist Mauro Ferreira gave the album three and a half stars, describing it as a jazz album that intentionally resists the conventions of samba jazz while noting that it incorporates noise textures, tension-driven improvisation, and reinterpretations of politically engaged sambas such as "Opiniã". and "Acender as Velas". The album also includes the freely improvised track "Improvisação". In January 2025, Mascarada was included in the São Paulo Art Critics Association list of the 50 best Brazilian albums of 2024, which was listened to twelve music critics.

His solo project Boca do Tempo, released on 16 July 2025, marked a new stage in his career by placing his voice and lyrics alongside the pandeiro and electronic textures. Conceived as a meditation on the death of his father and the birth of his son, the album reflects what Krakowski calls the "mouth of time", the passage in which lived experience is transformed. The work includes political commentary addressing contemporary authoritarian movements and introduces the concept of "Engrenagens Sonoras de Ativação", short rhythmic poems derived from Brazilian oral percussion traditions and used to generate percussive structures, exemplified in the single "Dongueragan". The project was recorded in the municipality of Araras, São Paulo after more than two decades of development in Rio de Janeiro, Paris, and New York and began touring in 2024.

== Discography ==
=== Solo ===
- Telecotekno Funk: O Chorofunk da Lapa (2010)
- Carrossel de Pássaros (2013)
- Pássaros: The Foundation of the Island (2016)
- Mascarada (2024)
- Boca do Tempo (2025)

=== With Tira Poeira ===
- Brasileirinho (2003)
- Feijoada Completa (2008)
