= Música de Rua (song) =

Single by Daniela Mercury

from the album Música de Rua
- Released: 1994
- Genre: Axé
- Length: 3:57
- Label: Epic Records
- Songwriters: Pierre Onassis, Daniela Mercury

Daniela Mercury singles chronology
"Bandidos da América" (1993)	"Música de Rua" (1994)	"O Reggae e o Mar" (1994)

"Música de Rua" (Portuguese for "Street Music") is a song recorded by Brazilian singer Daniela Mercury. It is the title track and lead single of her third studio album, with same name, which was released in 1994. The song became a huge success in Brazil and it is another signature song of Mercury's career.

== Song information ==
The lyrics of "Música de Rua", which were written by Pierre Onassis and co-written by Mercury are quite similar to "O Canto da Cidade", which cause some controversy with the critics who accused her of being a copycat of her last work. The lyrics are basically about celebrate the happiness in form of a protest.

== Music video ==
The music video of "Música de Rua" shows Mercury singing and dancing with her dancers on the streets of Salvador.

== Chart performance ==
"Música de Rua" was released as the first single from the eponymous album in 1994, it became her seventh #1 single on Brazilian charts.
