= Canibália (tour) =

2009–13 concert tour by Daniela Mercury

- Tour by Daniela Mercury
- Associated album: Canibália
- Start date: August 7, 2009
- End date: August 3, 2013
- Legs: 5

Daniela Mercury concert chronology
- Balé Mulato Tour (2006–07); Canibália (2009–13); Couchê Tour (2013)

Canibália was a concert tour by the Brazilian singer Daniela Mercury.

== Background ==
The concert tour began on August 7, on Citibank Hall, São Paulo. Eight days after, where she made another concert at Citibank Hall, she went to Rio de Janeiro and then took the tour to Portugal, where she performed in five cities, right after, back to the Latin American, European and North American. The tour counts with the participation of dancers, who danced the choreographies developed by Jorge Silva, recognized choreographer from Bahia. Gringo Cardia, the developer of the five covers of the album Canibália, was responsible for the elaboration of the scenario of the tour. On March 10, 2011, Mercury began her new tour Canibália: Ritmos do Brasil Tour to promote her new album of de same name recorded live in Copacabana Beach, in Rio de Janeiro.

== Set list ==
1. "Bênção Do Samba" (Sambas Medley):
  1. "Na Baixa Do Sapateiro"
  2. "O Samba Da Minha Terra"
  3. "Samba Da Bênção"
2. "Preta"
3. "O Mais Belo dos Belos (A Verdade do Ilê/O Charme da Liberdade)"
4. "Por Amor ao Ilê"
5. "Ilê Pérola Negra"
6. "O Que Será (Que Será?)" (Chico Buarque cover)
7. "O Reggae e o Mar"/"Batuque"
8. "O Que É Que A Baiana Tem?" (Carmen Miranda cover)
9. "Nobre Vagabundo"
10. "Minas com Bahia"
11. "A Vida É Um Carnaval"
12. "Quero A Felicidade"
13. "Rapunzel"
14. "Trio Em Transe"
15. "Vai Chover"
16. "Elétrica"
17. "Oyá Por Nós"
18. "Olodum É Rei"
19. "Swing Da Cor"
20. "Tico Tico no Fubá" (Carmen Miranda cover)
21. "Quero Ver O Mundo Sambar"
22. "Maimbê Dandá"
23. "O Canto Da Cidade"

== Tour dates ==
Pre-Tour: Europe and Brazil				Date	City	Country	Venue
Europa
July 25, 2009	Braga	Portugal	Complexo Pacha				
July 26, 2009	Algarve	Portugal	Portimão				
July 28, 2009	Cantanhede	Portugal	Parque Exposições Desportivo de S. Mateus				
South America
July 29, 2009	Popojuca	Brazil					
August 1, 2009	Araras	Brazil					
Debut
August 7, 2009	São Paulo	Brazil	Citibank Hall				
August 8, 2009	São Paulo	Brazil	Citibank Hall				
Europa
August 12, 2009	Vila Nova de Cerveira	Portugal	Praia de Lenta				
August 13, 2009	Matosinhos	Portugal	Praia da Memória				
August 14, 2009	Olhão	Portugal	Jardim Pescador Olhanense				
August 15, 2009	Ponte de Lima	Portugal	Parque de Exposições				
August 16, 2009	Espinho	Portugal	Largo da Câmara Municipal				
South America
August 21, 2009	Rio de Janeiro	Brazil	Canecão				
August 22, 2009	Rio de Janeiro	Brazil	Canecão				
August 23, 2009	Rio de Janeiro	Brazil	Canecão				
August 29, 2009	Fortaleza	Brazil	Iguatu Festeiro				
September 9, 2009	Córdoba	Argentina	Orfeo Superdomo				
September 10, 2009	Rosario	Argentina	Teatro Metropolitano				
September 12, 2009	Buenos Aires	Argentina	Estadio Luna Park				
October 24, 2009	Rio de Janeiro	Brazil	Oi Fashion Rocks				
December 19, 2009	Brasília	Brazil	Centro de Convenções Ulysses Guimarães				
December 31, 2009	Mata de São João	Brazil	Réveillon Costa do Sauípe				
January 1, 2010	Salvador	Brazil	Farol da Barra				
January 22, 2010	Salvador	Brazil	Festival de Verão de Salvador 2010				
January 23, 2010	João Pessoa	Brazil	Festival Estação Nordeste				
January 24, 2010	Natal	Brazil	Praia do Forte				
January 28, 2010	Florianópolis	Brazil	Espaço Tuguá				
April 21, 2010	Brasília	Brazil	Esplanada dos Ministérios				
April 22, 2010	Comandatuba	Brazil					
April 24, 2010	Cáceres	Brazil	30º Festival Internacional de Pesca				
Europa
May 1, 2010	Beja	Portugal	Arena Multiusos				
May 6, 2010	Évora	Portugal	Arena D'Évora				
May 7, 2010	Faro	Portugal	Largo de S. Francisco				
May 8, 2010	Coimbra	Portugal	Praça da Canção				
May 9, 2010	Braga	Portugal	Estádio Municipal de Braga				
South America
May 30, 2010	São Joaquim da Barra	Brazil	41º Festa da Soja				
Africa
June 2, 2010	Praia	Cape Verde	Praia de Gamboa				
Europa
June 9, 2010	Santarém	Portugal	CNEMA				
June 11, 2010	Vila Nova de Famalicão	Portugal	Estádio Nacional				
June 13, 2010	Paris	France					
South America
July 16, 2010	Formosa	Argentina	XXX Fiesta Del Pomelo				
Europa
August 7, 2010	Monte Gordo	Portugal	Trio Elétrico				
August 14, 2010	Olhão	Portugal					
August 15, 2010	Milan	Italy	XX Festival Latinoamericano				
August 19, 2010	Cascaes	Portugal	Festas do Mar de Cascais 2010				
South America
September 30, 2010	Córdoba	Argentina					
October 1, 2010	Buenos Aires	Argentina	Teatro Gran Rex				
October 2, 2010	Rosario	Argentina					
October 7, 2010	San Juan	Argentina	Fiesta de Las 2 Puntas				
October 20, 2010	São Paulo	Brazil	Teatro Bradesco				
December 31, 2010	Rio de Janeiro	Brazil	Praia de Copacabana				
January 1, 2011	Salvador	Brazil	Farol da Barra				
February 13, 2011	Salvador	Brazil	Museu du Ritmo				
March 10, 2011	São Paulo	Brazil	Alberto Bertelli Lucatto				
July 23, 2011	Fortaleza	Brazil	Fortal 2011				
August 12, 2011	Rio de Janeiro	Brazil	Expo Fest 2011				
September 27, 2011	Montevideo	Uruguay	Teatro de Verano Ramón Collazo				
North America
October 7, 2011	New York City	United States	Best Buy Theater				
October 8, 2011	Miami	United States	The Adrienne Arsht Center				
October 10, 2011	Mexico City	Mexico	Plaza Condesa				
October 11, 2011	Mexico City	Mexico	Plaza Condesa				
October 13, 2011	Los Angeles	United States	The Greek Theatre				
October 14, 2011	San Francisco	United States	The Paramount Theatre				
October 15, 2011	San Diego	United States	4th and B Theatre				
October 20, 2011	Toronto	Canada	TKool Haus				
Europa
November 10, 2011	Basel	Switzerland	XXVI AVO Session Basel				
South America
November 27, 2011	São Paulo	Brazil	Esquenta Verão São Paulo				
December 31, 2011	Aracaju	Brazil	Réveillon Praia de Atalaia				
January 1, 2012	Salvador	Brazil	Farol da Barra				
March 3, 2012	Rio de Janeiro	Brazil	Rio Verão Festival				
March 9, 2012	San Luis	Argentina	Autódromo Circuito Internacional de Potrero de los Funes				
March 10, 2012	San Luis	Argentina	Autódromo Circuito Internacional de Potrero de los Funes				
April 21, 2012	Porto Seguro	Brazil					
Asia
May 10, 2012	Tel Aviv	Israel	Tel Aviv White City Music Festival				
South America
August 4, 2012	São Paulo	Brazil	Via Funchal				
August 6, 2012	Rio de Janeiro	Brazil					
August 18, 2012	Fortaleza	Brazil	Centro de Eventos do Ceará				
August 31, 2012	Brasília	Brazil	O Maior São João do Cerrado				
December 16, 2012	Mar del Plata	Argentina	41° Fiesta Nacional del Mar				
December 31, 2012	São Paulo	Brazil	Réveillon na Avenida Paulista				
January 1, 2013	Salvador	Brazil	Farol da Barra				
January 26, 2013	Rio de Janeiro	Brazil					
February 1, 2013	João Pessoa	Brazil	XX Bloco Picolé com Manga				
Europa
April 5, 2013	Lisbon	Portugal	Coliseu de Lisboa				
April 6, 2013	Porto	Portugal	Coliseu do Porto				
South America
May 11, 2013	Prado	Brazil	Baile Perfumado				
May 18, 2013	São Paulo	Brazil	Virada Cultural 2013				
June 8, 2013	Brasília	Brazil	Boate Disel				
August 3, 2013	Bonito	Brazil	Festival de Inverno de Bonito				
