= Canibália =

Studio album by Daniela Mercury
- Released: (Brazil) October 23, 2009 (United States) October 24, 2009 (European Union) October 27, 2009 (Japan) November 3, 2009 (Canada) November 3, 2009
- Recorded: April 2008 – June 2009
- Genres: Axé, MPB, reggae, samba, rap, hip hop, R&B, electronic
- Length: 55:40
- Label: Sony Music
- Producers: Daniela Mercury, Ramiro Musotto, Alfredo Moura, Mikael Mutti, Gabriel Povoas and Wyclef Jean

Daniela Mercury chronology
O Canto da Cidade - 15 Anos (2008)	Canibália (2009)	Canibália: Ritmos do Brasil (2011)

Singles from Canibália
- 1. "Preta" Released: November 19, 2007; 2. "Oyá Por Nós" Released: January 5, 2009; 3. "Sol do Sul" Released: August 24, 2009

Canibália (English: Cannibalistic) is Daniela Mercury's ninth studio album, released on October 23, 2009, in Brazil by Sony Music. It was released on October 24 in the United States and on October 27 in the European Union. Mercury's first studio release in four years brings not only an eclectic sound, but also five different covers.

== Information ==
The album was produced by five musicians: Mercury herself and her son Gabriel Póvoas, in addition to Ramiro Musotto, Alfredo Moura, Mikael Mutti. According to Mercury, Canibália is the synthesis of the eclecticism of her work. On September 11, 2009, as the album was under post-production, Musotto died of cancer at age 45. A longtime collaborator of Mercury, he produced the electro-samba tracks of Canibália with her ("Benção do Samba" – a mash-up of samba classics "Na Baixa dos Sapateiros", "O Samba da Minha Terra", and "Samba de Bênção" – and "Tico-Tico no Fubá"). Mercury's friend and producer Neguinho do Samba, credited as "samba reggae creator", died later that month of a heart attack.

Mercury chose the title Canibália because she feels "cannibalized" since her breakthrough in the early 1990s with the release of O Canto da Cidade. She had postponed the release of Canibália several times. Seven of the album's fourteen tracks were written by Mercury, making this her most authored release since 1994's Música de Rua. Unlike Balé Mulato, whose tracks complemented each other, Canibália is an eclectic mix of sounds. In honour of Carmen Miranda's centenary, Mercury recorded a "duet" with her in the cover of "O Que É Que A Baiana Tem?", which includes the original 1939 phonogram. Mercury recorded another Miranda classic, "Tico-Tico No Fubá", which received the strong beat of Os Mutantes guitarist Sérgio Dias.

Beyond Carmen Miranda, Mercury also pays a tribute to the Brazilian cinema, in the track "Trio em Transe" (a reference to Glauber Rocha's Terra em Transe), and to the Native Brazilians, in the track "Dona Desse Lugar", that has arrangements, sounds and instruments specific of indigenous tribes. Mercury also pays a tribute to the Afro Brazilians in the track "Preta", a duet with Seu Jorge which is actually a mash-up of the songs "Eu sou Preta", "Sorriso Negro", and "Rap do Negão". Following the footsteps of Vanessa da Mata and Ana Carolina, which released English language songs, Mercury recorded "This Life is Beautiful", written and performed with Haitian singer Wyclef Jean. In "Oyá Por Nós", Mercury revisits the African roots of Brazilian spirituality. The album also features a cover of Chico Buarque's "O Que Será? (A Flor da Pele)", also performed as a duet with the late Mercedes Sosa on Cantora. In "Cinco Meninos", the whole Mercury family gathers to sing.

== Singles ==
- "Preta" was released to radio airplay in December 2007, aiming the 2008 Carnival. Featuring singer-songwriter Seu Jorge, this samba-reggae track is a mash-up of "Eu Sou Preto", "Sorriso Negro", and "Rap do Negão".
- "Oyá Por Nós" was released to radio airplay on January 5, 2009. Written and performed with Margareth Menezes, the song was released aiming the 2009 Carnival. A homage to Saint Mary and Oya, it was very well received by the audience, critics and artists such as Ivete Sangalo.
- "Sol do Sul" reached number 15 in the Rio de Janeiro FM radio stations chart, although "Oyá Por Nós" was intended as the hit for the 2009 Carnival. It peaked at number 5 in the Rio de Janeiro FM chart, prompting its national release on April 7, 2009.

== Track listing ==
Canibália – Trio Em Transe
No.	Title	Writer(s)	Length
1.	"Trio em Transe"	D. Mercury, G. Póvoas, M. dos Santos	3:12
2.	"Oyá Por Nós" (featuring Margareth Menezes)	M. Menezes, D. Mercury	3:55
3.	"O Que É Que A Baiana Tem?" (featuring Carmen Miranda)	D. Caymmi	3:29
4.	"Preta" (featuring Seu Jorge)	J. Velloso, M. de Castro, A. Barbado, J. Carvalho, J. Portela, Seu Jorge, G. Moura, W. Jeferson	3:50
5.	"Sol do Sul"	D. Mercury, G. Póvoas	4:35
6.	"A Vida É Um Carnaval"	T. Nader, V. Daniel	4:01
7.	"Castelo Imaginário"	D. Mercury, T. Nader, G. Póvoas	3:53
8.	"Dona Desse Lugar"	P. Daflin, D. Mercury, M. Quintanilha	3:42
9.	"This Life is Beautiful" (featuring Wyclef Jean)	W. Jean, D. Mercury, J. Duplessis	3:34
10.	"Bênção do Samba" (A mash-up of "Na Baixa do Sapateiro", "O Samba da Minha Terra" and "Samba de Bênção")	A. Barroso, D. Caymmi, B. Powell, V. de Moraes	4:47
11.	"Cinco Meninos"	D. Mercury	5:01
12.	"O Que Será? (À Flor da Pele)"	C. Buarque de Hollanda	4:02
13.	"One Love"	S. Tavares	4:13
14.	"Tico-Tico no Fubá"	Zequinha de Abreu	3:28

Canibália – Cinco Meninos
No.	Title	Writer(s)	Length
1.	"Cinco Meninos"	D. Mercury	5:01
2.	"Bênção do Samba" (A mash-up of "Na Baixa do Sapateiro", "O Samba da Minha Terra" and "Samba de Bênção")	A. Barroso, D. Caymmi, Baden Powell de Aquino, Vinicius de Moraes	4:47
3.	"O Que Será? (À Flor da Pele)"	C. Buarque de Hollanda	4:02
4.	"Preta" (featuring Seu Jorge)	J. Velloso, M. de Castro, A. Barbado, J. Carvalho, J. Portela, Seu Jorge, G. Moura, W. Jeferson	3:50
5.	"Sol do Sul"	D. Mercury, G. Póvoas	4:35
6.	"This Life is Beautiful" (featuring Wyclef Jean)	W. Jean, D. Mercury, Jerry Duplessis	3:34
7.	"Dona Desse Lugar"	P. Daflin, D. Mercury, M. Quintanilha	3:42
8.	"Castelo Imaginário"	D. Mercury, T. Nader, G. Póvoas	3:53
9.	"Trio em Transe"	D. Mercury, G. Póvoas, M. dos Santos	3:12
10.	"O Que É Que A Baiana Tem?" (featuring Carmen Miranda)	Dorival Caymmi	3:29
11.	"A Vida É Um Carnaval"	T. Nader, V. Daniel	4:01
12.	"Oyá Por Nós" (featuring Margareth Menezes)	M. Menezes, D. Mercury	3:55
13.	"One Love"	S. Tavares	4:13
14.	"Tico-Tico no Fubá"	Zequinha de Abreu	3:28

Canibália – O Que É Que A Baiana Tem?
No.	Title	Writer(s)	Length
1.	"O Que É Que A Baiana Tem?" (featuring Carmen Miranda)	Dorival Caymmi	3:29
2.	"This Life is Beautiful" (featuring Wyclef Jean)	W. Jean, D. Mercury, Jerry Duplessis	3:34
3.	"Sol do Sul"	D. Mercury, G. Póvoas	4:35
4.	"A Vida É Um Carnaval"	T. Nader, V. Daniel	4:01
5.	"Bênção do Samba" (A mash-up of "Na Baixa do Sapateiro", "O Samba da Minha Terra" and "Samba de Bênção")	A. Barroso, D. Caymmi, Baden Powell de Aquino, Vinicius de Moraes	4:47
6.	"Preta" (featuring Seu Jorge)	J. Velloso, M. de Castro, A. Barbado, J. Carvalho, J. Portela, Seu Jorge, G. Moura, W. Jeferson	3:50
7.	"Oyá Por Nós" (featuring Margareth Menezes)	M. Menezes, D. Mercury	3:55
8.	"Trio em Transe"	D. Mercury, G. Póvoas, M. dos Santos	3:12
9.	"Dona Desse Lugar"	P. Daflin, D. Mercury, M. Quintanilha	3:42
10.	"Castelo Imaginário"	D. Mercury, T. Nader, G. Póvoas	3:53
11.	"O Que Será? (À Flor da Pele)"	C. Buarque de Hollanda	4:02
12.	"One Love"	S. Tavares	4:13
13.	"Cinco Meninos"	D. Mercury	5:01
14.	"Tico-Tico no Fubá"	Zequinha de Abreu	3:28

== Release history ==
Region	Date
Brazil	October 23, 2009
United States	October 24, 2009
Europe	October 27, 2009
Canada	November 3, 2009
Japan	November 3, 2009
Portugal	November 27, 2009
France	November 27, 2009
Italy	November 27, 2009
Belgium	November 27, 2009
