= Vinil Virtual =

Studio album by Daniela Mercury
- Released: November 27, 2015
- Recorded: 2014–2015
- Genre: Axé, MPB
- Label: Biscoito Fino
- Producer: Daniela Mercury, Yacocê Simões

Daniela Mercury chronology
Daniela Mercury & Cabeça de Nós Todos (2013)	Vinil Virtual (2015)	O Axé, A Voz e o Violão (2016)

Singles from Vinil Virtual
- 1. "A Rainha do Axé (Rainha Má)" Released: November 26, 2014

Vinil Virtual is the tenth studio album by the Brazilian singer-songwriter Daniela Mercury. It was released on November 27, 2015, by the label Biscoito Fino.

== Development ==
Vinil Virtual was produced by Mercury and Yacoce Simões. All the fifteen tracks were written by her, ten of these tracks were written by herself. Two songs were written with Marcelo Quintanilha, two with here son Gabriel Póvoas and one with Simões. "The songwriters who send me some songs did not translate what I wanted to say at that moment".

== Songs and lyrics ==
Mercury turned two poems written to her wife into songs: "Maria Casaria" and "Sem Argumento". "América do Amor" talks about the Latin American brotherhood, as "Antropofágicos São Paulistanos" celebrates the mix of cultures of the city of São Paulo, "O Riso de Deus" talks with the funk of Rio's proms, as praises the city of Rio de Janeiro. "Senhora do Terreiro (Mãe Carmem)" is about the iyalorixá (priestess) Carmem Oliveira da Silva, daughter and successor of the iyalorixá known as Mãe Menininha do Gantois. "De Deus, de Alah, de Gilberto Gil" is a tribute to the Brazilian singer, songwriter and musician Gilberto Gil, which makes a participation on the track. "Alegria e Lamento" it's a mix of Márcio Victor's percussion with takes of an old record of the already dead Neguinho do Samba, one of the founders of the Olodum. Mercury wrote a song in English with her son Gabriel Póvoas, called "Frogs in the Sky".

== Artwork ==
The cover artwork for Vinil Virtual was revealed for the Rolling Stone Brasil magazine on November 16, 2015. It shows Mercury lying, naked, next to her wife Malu Verçosa, been inspired by the musician couple John Lennon and Yoko Ono, that were on the cover of the No. 335 edition of the American Rolling Stone magazine in January 1981. Mercury said:

"For those who tell to hide myself, I show myself naked. I'm not ashamed to love. I would be ashamed to hate. [...] I was invited too many time to pose naked for the Playboy and I never wanted. Now, I use my body, my nude, to make a pacific and political maniphesto on the war against homophobia. The purpose is not to shock". The singer also said that the purpose of the album cover were to "stand up in a beautiful way. It's to use my image like a expression of my life, my art, my love. Love is the great element of transformation. I did a beautiful cover that represents a feminist maniphesto in a time that all the women still needs to stand up for themselves. Through this cover, I'm connected with John and Yoko and their maniphestos of love and peace, against any type of violence. It is up to us, artists, to be the peacemakers, breaking the barriers and prejudices".

== Track listing ==
No.	Title	Writer(s)	Length
1.	"A Rainha do Axé (Rainha Má)"	Daniela Verçosa	5:09
2.	"Maria Casaria"	Verçosa	4:17
3.	"América do Amor"	Verçosa	5:01
4.	"Alegria e Lamento"	Verçosa	4:44
5.	"Tô Samba da Vida"	Verçosa	3:35
6.	"Sem Argumento"	Verçosa	4:11
7.	"Frogs in the Sky"	Verçosa, Gabriel Póvoas	5:10
8.	"De Deus, De Alah, De Gilberto Gil" (featuring Gilberto Gil)	Verçosa	5:15
9.	"Extranhos Terrestres"	Verçosa, Aperto de Mente	5:34
10.	"Antropofágicos São Paulistanos"	Verçosa, Yacoce Simões	4:17
11.	"O Riso de Deus"	Verçosa	3:50
12.	"Vinil Virtual" (Aperto de Mente 2)	Verçosa	4:13
13.	"Três Vozes"	Verçosa, Marcello Quintanilha	4:34
14.	"Minha Mãe, Minha Pátria"	Verçosa, Quintanilha	3:42
15.	"Senhora do Terreiro" (Mãe Carmem)	Verçosa, Póvoas	3:56
