= Classica =

Classica may refer to:

- Classical music
- Classica (magazine), a French classical music magazine
- Classica HD, an Italian speciality television channel
- Stingray Classica, a speciality television channel in Germany owned by Stingray Digital
- Clássica (Daniela Mercury album), by Brazilian singer Daniela Mercury
- Classica (Novembre album), by Italian heavy metal band Novembre
