= Sou de Qualquer Lugar =

Studio album by Daniela Mercury
- Released: November 20, 2001
- Recorded: May – August 2001
- Genres: Pop, axé, disco
- Label: RCA / BMG

Daniela Mercury chronology
Sol da Liberdade (2000)	Sou de Qualquer Lugar (2001)	MTV ao Vivo - Eletrodoméstico (2003)

Singles from Sou de Qualquer Lugar
- 1. "Beat Lamento" Released: 2001; 2. "Mutante" Released: 2002; 3. "Estrelas" Released: 2002

Professional ratings
Review scores
Source	Rating
Allmusic	3/5 stars

Sou de Qualquer Lugar (English: I'm from Anywhere) is the sixth studio album by Brazilian singer Daniela Mercury, released on November 20, 2001 on RCA Records. After the success of the previous record, Sol da Liberdade (2000), which one she experimented electronic genres, she decided to following the experience with new sounds, like pop and dance, but also new genres that were winning space at the time, like the forró.

Sou de Qualquer Lugar received mixed critics, the album was not well received by some critics who didn't accept the singer change of sound, and the many different genres on the work. The album was certified gold by the ABPD, selling over 200.000 copies, and becoming the less selling album at the time.

== Track listing ==
No.	Title	Writer(s)	Length
1.	"De Qualquer Lugar"	Dudu Falcão, Lenine	4:35
2.	"Baiana Havaneira"	Carlinhos Brown	3:25
3.	"A Praieira"	Chico Science	3:43
4.	"Beat Lamento"	Márcio Mello	3:38
5.	"Aeromoça"	Daniela Mercury, Gabriel Povoas	3:40
6.	"Estrelas" (featuring Toni Garrido)	Del Rey, Neto	3:44
7.	"Ata-Me"	Mercury	3:18
8.	"Mutante"	Roberto de Carvalho, Rita Lee	4:24
9.	"Um Tempo de Paixão"	Dalto, Rabello	3:49
10.	"Bora Morar"	Brown	4:21
11.	"Quem Puder Ser Bom Que Seja"	Gilberto Gil	3:59
12.	"Janela"	Kiko Furtado, Daniel Gonzaga	3:49
13.	"Nossa Música"	Fonseca	3:53
14.	"Nina"	Mercury	4:03
