= Clássica (album) =

Live album and Video by Daniela Mercury
- Released: Sep 27, 2005
- Genres: MPB, bossa nova
- Label: Som Livre

Daniela Mercury chronology
Carnaval Eletrônico (2004)	Clássica (2005)	Balé Mulato (2005)

Singles from Clássica
- 1. "Aeromoça" Released: 2005

Professional ratings
Review scores
Source	Rating
Allmusic	2.5/5 stars

Clássica (English: Classical) is the third live album by Brazilian singer Daniela Mercury, released on September 27, 2005 on Som Livre.

== Track listing ==
Clássica – CD
No.	Title	Writer(s)	Length
1.	"And I Love Her"	John Lennon, Paul McCartney
2.	"Covered Saints"	Carlinhos Brown
3.	"Maria Clara"	Mercury
4.	"Retrato em Branco e Preto"	Chico Buarque, Tom Jobim
5.	"Brigas Nunca Mais"	Jobim, Vinícius de Moraes
6.	"Atrás da Porta"	Buarque, Francis Hime
7.	"Serrado"	Djavan
8.	"Derradeira Primavera"	Jobim, Moraes
9.	"Sua Estupidez" (featuring Vânia Abreu)	Roberto Carlos, Erasmo Carlos
10.	"Aeromoça"	Mercury, Gabriel Póvoas
11.	"Vapor Barato"	Waly Salomão, Jards Macalé
12.	"Se Eu Quiser Falar com Deus"	Gilberto Gil
13.	"Corsário"	João Bosco, Aldir Blanc
14.	"Divino Maravilhoso"	Gil, Caetano Veloso

Clássica – DVD
No.	Title	Length
