= Sol da Liberdade =

Studio album by Daniela Mercury
- Released: April 2000
- Recorded: January 2000
- Genres: Axé, MPB
- Length: 67:43
- Label: BMG)

Daniela Mercury chronology
Elétrica (1998)	Sol da Liberdade (2000)	Sou de Qualquer Lugar (2001)

Singles from Sol da Liberdade
- 1. "Ilê Pérola Negra" Released: 1999; 2. "Santa Helena" Released: 2000; 3. "Como Vai Você?" Released: 2000; 4. "Só No Balanço do Mar" Released: 2001

Professional ratings
Review scores
Source	Rating
Allmusic	link

Sol da Liberdade (Portuguese for Sun of freedom) is the fifth studio album by Daniela Mercury, released in April 2000 in Brazil through BMG. Two of its singles, "Ilê Pérola Negra" and "Como Vai Você", became number-one hits in Brazil. The other single released from the album, "Santa Helena", peaked at number twenty-six.

== Background ==
On the cover of Sol da Liberdade, photographed by Mario Cravo Neto and created by Gringo Cardia, the singer wields a dry branch that suggests a sword, but her peaceful look eliminates an intention of war. "There I represented a black Iansã that freed Brazil from slavery in commemoration of the 500th anniversary of the country." said Mercury.

Two songs present in Sol da Liberdade made huge success in Brazilian radios. The first was "Ilê Pérola Negra", a song that actually the joining of two different compositions: "O Canto do Negro" (The Song of the Negro) written by Miltão and "Pérola Negra" (Black Pearl) written by Guiguio and Rene Poison. The music video of this song won the VMB award for Best Axé Video. The other song that reached enormous popularity on the radio was "Como Vai Você?", a song written by the brothers Antonio and Mario Marcos, who was part of the soundtrack of the telenovela "Laços de Família" (Family Ties). Other songs on the album, such as "Santa Helena" and "Só No Balanço do Mar" - the latter included in the soundtrack of another telenovela "Porto dos Milagres" (Port of Miracles) - won a success somewhat moderate.

It was also released a re-edition of the album produced especially for the countries of Latin America. This re-edition, produced by the famous Emilio Estefan Jr., contained some tracks sung in Spanish.

== Track listing ==
No.	Title	Writer(s)	Length
1.	"Sol da Liberdade" (featuring Milton Nascimento)	Daniela Mercury	4:34
2.	"Groove da Baiana"	Jorge Zárath, Paulo Vascon, Tenison Del Rey	4:12
3.	"Ilê Pérola Negra"	Miltão, Rene Veneno, Guiguio	5:53
4.	"Santa Helena"	Márcio Mello	5:15
5.	"Axé Axé" (Música incidental: "Chão da Praça")	Caetano Veloso, Moraes, Fausto Nilo	4:04
6.	"Itapuã @no 2000"	Lucas Santtana, Quito Ribeiro	3:41
7.	"Sou Você"	Veloso	4:01
8.	"Dara" (featuring Angélique Kidjo)	Mercury	4:33
9.	"Funk da Decepção"	Mello	4:03
10.	"Só no Balanço do Mar"	Lenine, Dudu Falcão	3:42
11.	"Viagem"	Vanessa da Mata	4:30
12.	"De Tanto Amor"	Roberto Carlos, Erasmo Carlos	3:49
13.	"Crença e Fé"	Beto Jamaica, Ademário	4:53
14.	"Ilê Pérola Negra" (Club Mix)	Miltão, Rene Veneno, Guiguio	10:38
15.	"Como Vai Você" (Bonus Track)	Antônio Marcos, Mário Marcos	3:49

== Chart performance ==
Chart (2000)	Peak position
Portugal Albums Chart	4

== Certifications ==
Region	Certification	Certified units/sales
Brazil (Pro-Música Brasil)	Platinum	250,000^{*}
^{*} Sales figures based on certification alone.
