= Música de Rua =

Studio album by Daniela Mercury
- Released: July 1994
- Genres: Axé, MPB
- Label: Epic (Sony Music)
- Producer: Liminha

Daniela Mercury chronology
O Canto da Cidade (1992)	Música de Rua (1994)	Feijão com Arroz (1996)

Singles from Música de Rua
- 1. "Música de Rua" Released: 1994; 2. "O Reggae e o Mar" Released: 1995; 3. "Domingo no Candeal" Released: 1995; 4. "Rosa" Released: 1995; 5. "Por Amor Ao Ilê" Released: 1996

Professional ratings
Review scores
Source	Rating
AllMusic	3/5 stars

Música de Rua (Portuguese for "Street Music") is the third album by the Brazilian axé and MPB singer Daniela Mercury, released in 1994 through Sony Music.

Música de Rua was released right after the massive success of Mercury's previous album, O Canto da Cidade (1992). It was very well received by the public, and spreading two number-one singles ("Música de Rua" e "O Reggae e o Mar"). However, Música de Rua was not very well received by the critics who pointed out that the album sounded too similar to Mercury's previous and accused it of being a copycat of her own work. Música de Rua was Mercury's most authorial work until the release of Canibália in 2009. Camille Paglia called "Rap Repente" "'absolutely thrilling ... It's like a mini-opera!'"

== Track listing ==
No.	Title	Writer(s)	Length
1.	"Música de Rua"	Pierre Onassis, Daniela Mercury	3:24
2.	"Vulcão da Liberdade"	Tonho Matéria	3:33
3.	"Alegria Ocidental"	Mercury, Liminha	3:08
4.	"Tem Amor"	Mercury, Liminha	4:19
5.	"Saudade"	Angelique Kidjo, John Hebrail/Portuguese version: Mercury	3:27
6.	"Rosa"	Onassis	3:30
7.	"O Reggae e o Mar"	Rey Zullo, Mercury	3:16
8.	"Rap Repente"	Mercury, Ramiro, David, Beto, Cesário, Toni	3:32
9.	"Domingo no Candeal"	Lucas Santana, Quito Ribeiro	3:43
10.	"Sempre te Quis"	Herbert Vianna	4:20
11.	"Folia de Rei"	Carlinhos Brown, Alain Tavares	2:53
12.	"Por Amor ao Ilê"	Guiguio	2:57
13.	"Música de la Calle (Spanish version)"	Pierre Onassis, Daniela Mercury	3:22

== Release history ==
Region	Date
Brazil	July, 1994
North America	October 11, 1994
Europe	October 11, 1994

== Sales and certifications ==
Region	Certification	Certified units/sales
Brazil (Pro-Música Brasil)	2× Platinum	500,000^{*}
^{*} Sales figures based on certification alone.
