= Leading Women =

American consulting firm

Leading Women is an American consulting firm, designed to counteract gender disparity in corporate business, founded by Susan Colantuono in 2003. Its primary aim is to reduce the gender gap in business leaders, and consulting with organisations to help them do this.

Colantuono reviewed dozens of studies and discovered that managers expect women to excel at interpersonal skills and to be deficient in business, financial and strategic acumen. She dubbed this The Missing 33% of the career success equation for women. Further research on the careers of 2,000 women and found that when selecting candidates for career advancement, organisations prioritise business and strategic acumen by a factor of 2 to 1. These and many other findings contradict the traditional career advice given to women, which stresses the importance of team and interpersonal skills instead of knowing the business well. At a TEDx conference, in 2013, Colantuono presented her findings that women are believed to lack business, strategic and financial acumen. as well as related research on bias in existing human resources and promotion systems.

In 2018, Colantuono announced she would step down from the organisation at the end of the year. She was replaced as CEO by Kelly Lockwood Primus. Primus has said diversity and inclusion help a company, as it fosters collaboration and innovation, helping a business' bottom line. In October 2019, the organisation expanded to include conference services and provide their services to everyone instead of just select high-profile organisations.
