= Daniela Mercury =

Brazilian singer-songwriter (born 1965)

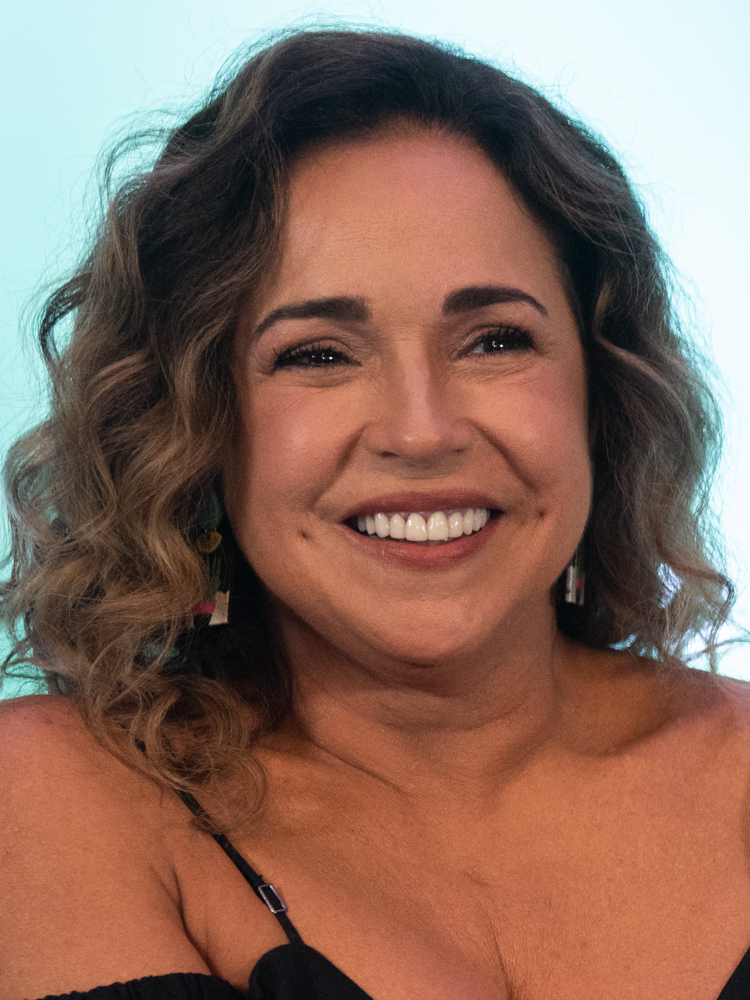
- Mercury in 2023

Background information
- Born: Daniela Mercuri de Almeida; July 28, 1965 (age 61); Salvador, Bahia, Brazil
- Genres: Axé; latin pop; samba reggae; MPB
- Occupations: Singer; songwriter; record producer; dancer
- Instrument: Vocals
- Years active: 1989–present
- Labels: Estúdio Eldorado; Epic; BMG/MTV; Sony Music; EMI
- Website: Official website

Daniela Mercury (born Daniela Mercuri de Almeida on July 28, 1965) is a Brazilian singer, songwriter, dancer, and producer. In her solo career, Mercury has sold over 11 million records worldwide, and had 24 Top 10 singles in the country, with 14 of them reached No. 1. Winner of a Latin Grammy for her album Balé Mulato – Ao Vivo, she also received six Brazilian Music Award, an APCA award, three Multishow Brazilian Music Awards and two awards at VMB: Best Music Video and Photography.

In 1991, Mercury released her self-titled album, which was followed by O Canto da Cidade a year later, boosting her career as a national artist and taking the axé music to the evidence. Over the years, Mercury released several albums, generating great singles like "Swing da Cor", "O Canto da Cidade", "À Primeira Vista", "Rapunzel", "Nobre Vagabundo", "Ilê Pérola Negra", "Mutante", "Maimbê Dandá", "Levada Brasileira", "Oyá Por Nós", among others. She recorded a commemorative DVD of Cirque du Soleil's 25th anniversary, and was part of the Montreal Jazz Festival. In addition, Mercury was invited to participate in the Alejandro Sanz's DVD, and sing with Paul McCartney in Oslo, Norway, during the delivery of the Nobel Peace Prize.

In 2009 she released her album called Canibália, along with the album, Daniela launched an international tour. The album spawned three singles: "Preta" with Seu Jorge, "Oyá Por Nós" with Margareth Menezes and "Sol do Sul". That same year, writer and intellectual Camille Paglia, who had an intellectual "passion" for Madonna, said Daniela Mercury is the artist who Madonna would like to be.

In 2011 the American TV channel CBS, elected Daniela Mercury as the "Carmen Miranda of the new times". The Canibália album was released in the United States yielded a critique of The New York Times saying: "Daniela Mercury goes beyond the concepts that were stressed during her career (...) with a contemporary pop, embracing ethnic and cultural diversity of Brazil (particularly african-Brazilian culture, while Daniela Mercury is white), remembering the past and transforming it."

== Early life ==
Daniela Mercuri de Almeida was born on July 28, 1965, in the Portuguese Hospital in Salvador, Bahia. Her mother is Liliana Mercuri, a social worker of Italian ancestry, and her father is António Fernando de Abreu Ferreira de Almeida, a Portuguese emigrant industrial mechanic. Mercury grew up in a middle class household in the Brotas neighborhood of Salvador with her four siblings: Tom, Cristiana, Vânia (who would also become a singer, billed as Vânia Abreu), and Marcos. A troublemaker as a child, Mercury was nicknamed "drip-fire". She attended both the Ana Néri School and the Colégio Baiano.

At eight years old, Mercury began taking dance lessons, particularly classical ballet, jazz, and African dances. At age 13, influenced by the work of Elis Regina, she decided to become a singer. Her repertoire consisted of bossa nova as well as the music of Caetano Veloso, Gilberto Gil, and Chico Buarque. To her parents' unease she started singing in local bars in 1980. She made her trio elétrico debut soon afterward, during the 1981 carnival. Mercury's zeal for dance eventually led her to the Federal University of Bahia, where she enrolled in the Dance School in 1984. A year later she married electronic engineer Zalther Póvoas and gave birth to Gabriel Almeida Póvoas. The next year she gave birth to daughter Giovana Almeida Póvoas.

== Career ==
=== Early career (1984–1990) ===
From 1986 to 1988, Mercury was the lead singer for the band Cheiro de Amor. Mercury continued to pursue a career in music and, by 1988, was a backup singer for Gilberto Gil. In 1989, recorded her first two albums as the lead singer of pop band Companhia Clic. Their songs "Pega que Oh!" and "Ilha das Bananas" became minor hits in Bahia radio stations. As the 1990s began, Mercury decided to pursue a solo career.

=== Rise to fame (1991–1993) ===
Mercury's self-titled debut album was released in 1991 through independent record company Eldorado. The lead single of the album, "Swing da Cor", which features Olodum, became a number-one hit in Brazil, and the album was soon known as Swing da Cor. Another song from the album, "Menino do Pelô", which also features Olodum, became Mercury's second top-ten hit in Brazil, charting at number four. On the following year, Mercury shut off from the record company and, ever since, produces her own albums to negotiate the distribution of them later with the labels that are interested.

In 1992, she presented the project "Som do Meio-Dia" (Midday Sound) at the Art Museum of São Paulo (MASP). The show brought together over thirty thousand spectators, which eventually leave the traffic jam in the vicinity of the Paulista Avenue. After forty-minutes concert, Daniela was removed from the stage by representatives of the São Paulo tourist office, that concerned with the museum structure, obtained an order from the military police to remove it from the local.

Soon after the show, Daniela was hired by Sony Music label and through this, released her second solo album, O Canto da Cidade. The album was considered by journalist André Domingues one of the best MPB albums ever. O Canto da Cidade is Mercury's album with most number-one songs (four in total; "O Canto da Cidade", "O Mais Belo dos Belos", "Batuque" and "Você Não Entende Nada/Cotidiano"). O Canto da Cidade is recognized as the album responsible for taking Axé Music to mainstream audiences in Brazil.

The album also yielded Mercury, a year-end special on Rede Globo channel, which were mixed with live performances in the square of Apotheosis in Rio de Janeiro, and video clips with Caetano Veloso, Herbert Vianna and Tom Jobim. Years later, the special, previously unreleased in video was released on DVD to celebrate the 15th anniversary of the release of the album. In July 1993, Mercury was one of Brazil's attractions at the prestigious Montreux Jazz Festival in Switzerland.

Some consider O Canto da Cidade was the forerunner of the samba-reggae movement, then called Axé Music, gaining strength in all regions of the country and allowing other genre artists, were featured in the Brazilian music scene. It is believed that after this album, the Carnival of Bahia gained a massive media coverage. Mercury experienced during this period, a peak of popularity rarely seen in the history of Brazilian music industry, being dubbed "the hurricane of Bahia" and "Queen of the Axé".

=== Artistic development (1994–2000) ===
In 1994, Música de Rua was released through Sony. The album was received with lukewarm reviews, with some critics complaining about the similarities between this album and its predecessor. Nevertheless, the album was very well received by the public, producing the hits "Música de Rua", "O Reggae e o Mar" (both number-one hits), "Por Amor ao Ilê" (a top-ten hit) and "A Rosa" (top-twenty). This was Mercury's first album to produce singles which have failed to chart.

In 1996, Feijão com Arroz was released through Sony. This album was much better received by the critics than its predecessor. It is Mercury's most well rated album at Allmusic, with four and a half stars. As of today, Feijão com Arroz is Mercury's second best selling album, behind only O Canto da Cidade. It produced the hits "À Primeira Vista", "Nobre Vagabundo", "Rapunzel" (all number-one hits), "Minas com Bahia" (which features Samuel Rosa from Skank and was a top-twenty hit) and "Feijão de Corda" (a top-ten hit).

In 1998, Mercury's first live album, Elétrica was released through Sony. It produced the top-ten hit "Trio Metal", which charted at number eight.

=== Experimentation with electronica (2000–2004) ===
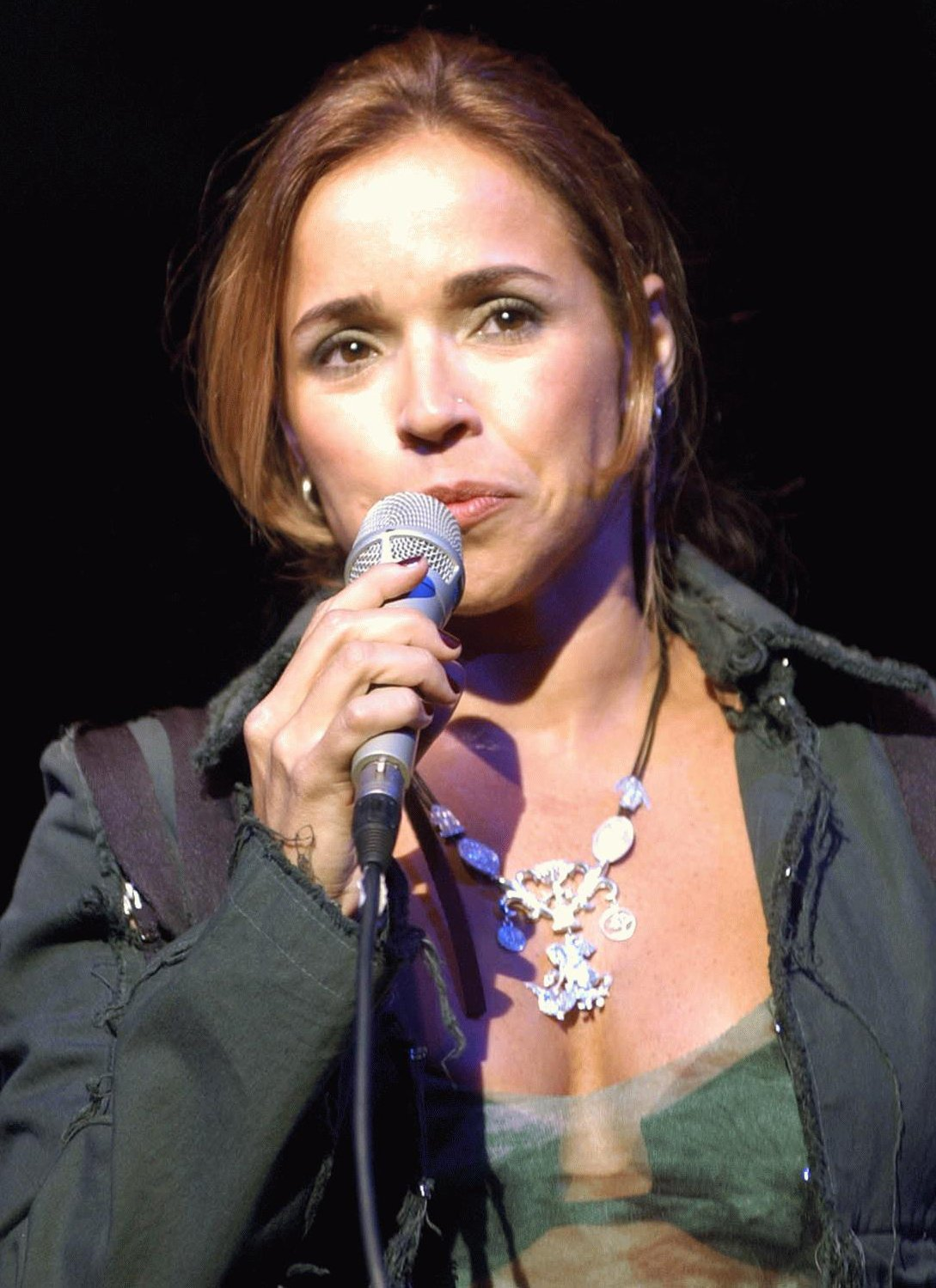
Mercury performing in the concert Solidariedade Brasil-Noruega on October 7, 2003, in Teatro Nacional, Brasília

In 2000, Mercury released her fifth studio album, Sol da Liberdade, through BMG. It produced two number-one singles ("Ilê Pérola Negra" and a cover of Antonio Marcus' "Como Vai Você"). The album, which was produced by Suba, was innovative in Mercury's career for its fusion with electronic music sounds.

The following year, Mercury released Sou de Qualquer Lugar through BMG. The album sold half of its predecessor, but was able to produce the number-one single "Mutante", a cover of Rita Lee. In this album, Mercury also experimented with electronic sounds.

In April 2003, Mercuy's second live album, MTV ao Vivo – Eletrodoméstico, was released through BMG. It was recorded on January 23 and 24 of that same year at the Castro Alves Theater in Salvador for MTV Brasil. It was also released in the DVD format, Mercury's first. Among the artists who performed with the singer were Dulce Pontes, Rosario Flores, Jovanotti, Carlinhos Brown and Olodum. The sales were very inferior to Mercury's previous and it only produced one top twenty hit ("Meu Plano").

In 2004, Carnaval Eletrônico was released through BMG. For the recording of this album, Mercury invited DJs and producers of electronic music in Brazil, as well as Gilberto Gil, Carlinhos Brown, and Lenine. It is a commemorative disc celebrating the five years of her having formed TrioTechno, the first trio elétrico of electronic music in Bahian Carnaval. The disc received a Latin Grammy nomination for best pop album of the year and Mercury was nominated for a TIM Award for best female pop/rock vocalist. Internet users voted Carnaval Eletrônico the best pop album of the year online in one of Brazil's most important weekly magazines Revista Isto É.

=== Back to basics (2005–2007) ===
In 2005, Clássica was released through Som Livre on both CD and DVD. Recorded from a concert Mercury gave the year before at São Paulo's Casa de Espetáculo, the album is a sampler of bossa nova, jazz, and some of her biggest MPB hits. The record signaled a new phase for Mercury, who chose independence from record companies to gain full control of her work. Mercury was in London, during the July 7 bombings.

That same year, Mercury's eighth studio album, Balé Mulato, was released, but through EMI. The album was very well received by the critics, with some even saying it was Mercury's best album since Feijão com Arroz (1996). It was not, however, very well received by the public, with none of the singles being able to chart on the top-ten; a large part due to lack of record company support. The next year, the Latin Grammy Award-winning live version of Balé Mulato, was released. Daniela Mercury has completed her newest release, Canibália. Canibalia was launched in October 2009.

=== Reinventing popular culture with Canibália and working with Cabeça de Nós Todos (2007–2013) ===
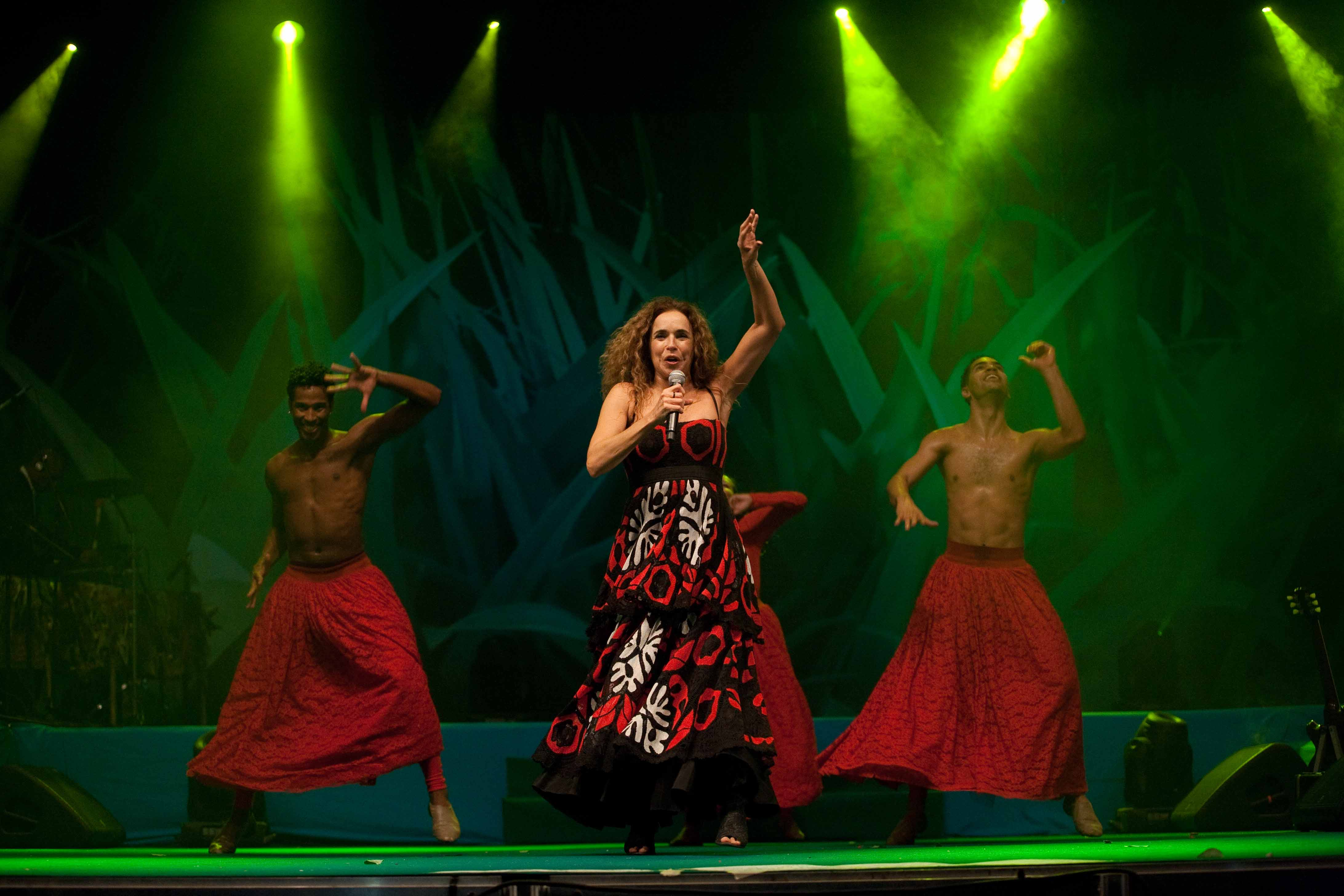
Mercury in 2010.

On November 19, 2007, the singer released "Preta", which features Seu Jorge. The song, which is strongly influenced by samba, was one of the most played in the country during the carnival. For the 2009's Carnival, Mercury recorded the song "Oyá Por Nós", who wrote with Alfredo Moura and Margareth Menezes. The theme, based on the song "Ketu de Iansã" was first used by Moura in the doctoral ceremony honoris-cause of Gilberto Gil at the University of Aveiro in Portugal. After that, Moura used the theme in a play in Vienna, Austria, at the University of Musicology. A year later, he showed the theme for Daniela, who did not know and she immediately wanted to record it to launch in the Carnival. In 2009, Rolling Stone Brasil magazine named Daniela as one of the 100 greatest artists of Brazilian music of all time. The names chosen by the expert jury, only 16 were women.

In November 2009, Daniela released the album entitled Canibália. It was released with five different covers and five different track lists for the album. Upon releasing the album, she toured starting in São Paulo, and traveled to several Brazilian cities and abroad. The work pays tribute to Carmen Miranda, at her centenary, with songs like "Tico-Tico no Fubá" and "O Que É Que A Baiana Tem?".

For 2010's Carnival, Daniela Mercury recorded "Andarilho Encantado", song released officially in the special project of the singer called Pôr do Som (Sunset Sound), the show that brings Mercury as headliner each year on the first day of the year at the Farol da Barra, in Salvador, Bahia. The song was written by Mercury and Marcelo Quintanilha. Also in 2010, the year that the Electric Trio celebrates 60 years and Axé Music 25 years, the singer reaches 20 years of solo career – with significant-selling records. To commemorate the date, the media raised the possibility it make a documentary film about this invention of Bahian carnival, the axé music, praising percussionists.

In February 2013, the singer was invited to be interviewed in the Leading Women program of CNN International, and was announced by the issuer as the "Brazilian Madonna". The attraction highlights the most influential women in the world in their fields. Already in 2012, the Bahian singer had attracted the attention of American writer and feminist Camille Paglia, who declared to the British newspaper The Independent, that had a "crush" by the Bahian star. Since she had been in the country, for a conference in Bahia, Paglia has written enthusiastic articles about Mercury, saying that Daniela Mercury is the artist who Madonna wanted to be. Paglia said, a Canadian television station, which is "in love with a Brazilian superstar. I'm watching her work. She is Daniela Mercury. In fact, this has been very important. This is the point where I am in my life" . In an interview with the Brazilian magazine Veja, intellectual revealed her plans to write two books about the Bahian singer.

At the end of 2013, released the album Daniela Mercury & Cabeça de Nós Todos, a partnership with the Brazilian group Cabeça de Nós Todos, with songs like "Couché", "Alma Feminina", "Paula e Bebeto", "Aquele Abraço" and "Cheia de Graça" are some of the tracks are presented in this work. It is an urban and pop-rock album, which does not show Daniela's rhythmic signature; it was launched with a book called "Daniela and Malu, A Love Story", a partnership with her wife Malu Verçosa. The book tells the story of their relationship, from the moment of friendship to marriage.

=== The Voice Kids and Vinil Virtual (2014–present) ===
In 2014, she was mentor on The Voice Kids (the version for children of the traditional show The Voice) of Portugal, because of her popularity in Portuguese lands. In the same year she released the single "A Rainha do Axé (Rainha Má)", an electronic ijexá that speaks about the strength of women, love and faith which was sung by revelers during the 2015's Carnival of Salvador. The single is the first single to the fifteenth studio album by the singer titled Vinil Virtual, released November 27, 2015 by the label Biscoito Fino.

== Personal life ==
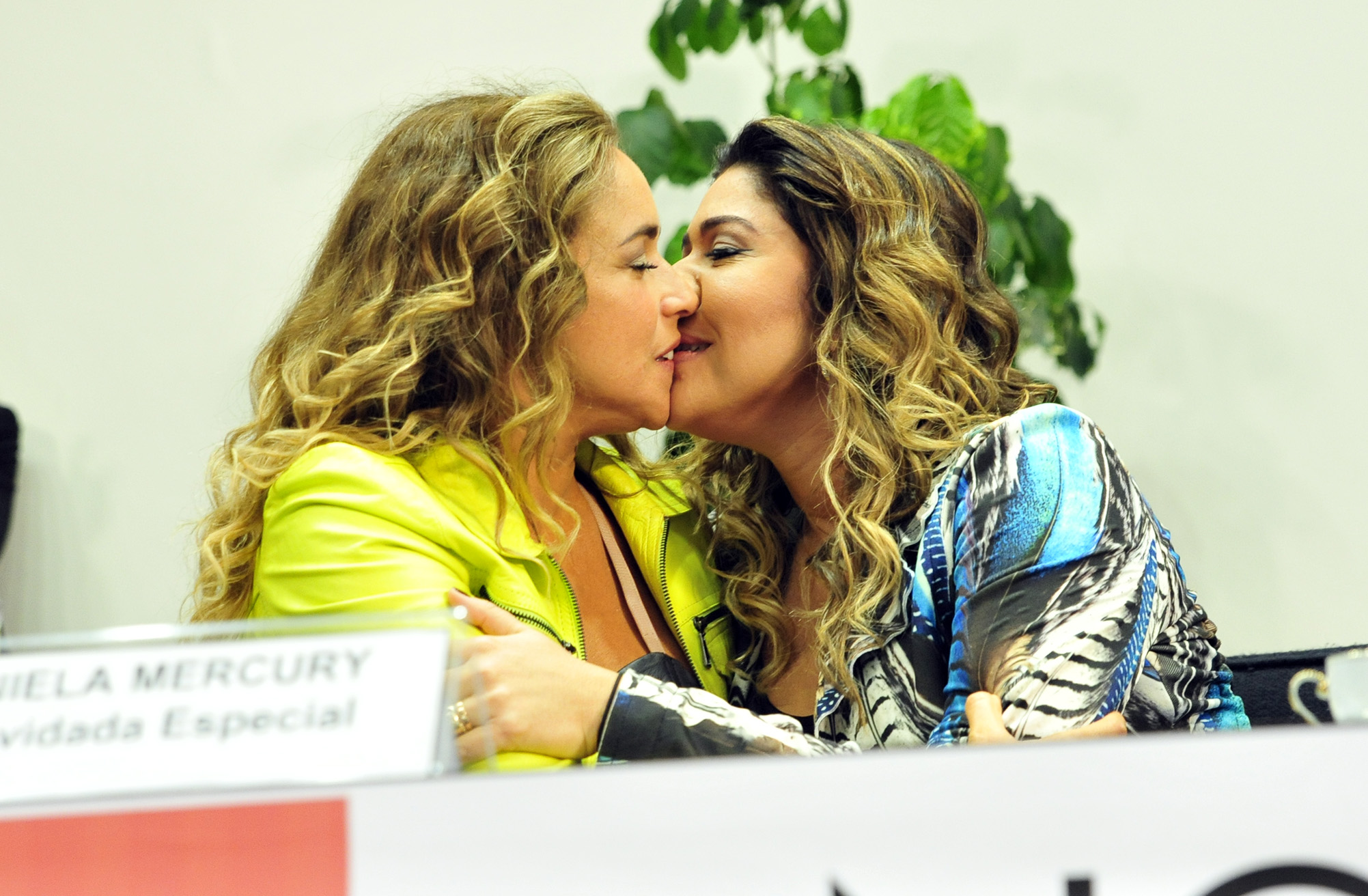
Mercury and her wife Malu Verçosa participating in an LGBT seminar in the Chamber of Deputies in Brasília

In 1984, at 19, Mercury married electronic engineer Zalther Portela Laborda Póvoas, her high school boyfriend. The next year, on September 3, 1985, she gave birth to their first child, Gabriel (who is also a singer and songwriter). The following year, she gave birth to a girl named Giovana (who is now a dancer in Mercury's ensemble). In 1996, Mercury and Póvoas divorced. That same year, she was pointed as the reason for the split between Chico Buarque and Marieta Severo. In an interview to ISTOÉ magazine, Mercury said that "it was a levity what they did, an irresponsibility that caused an uproar in my life and in the lives of both of them". In April 2013 Daniela Mercury used social media to make public her relationship with the journalist Malu Verçosa, saying that "Malu is now my wife, my family, my inspiration to sing." Daniela Mercury and Malu Verçosa married on October 12, 2013, in a civil ceremony in Salvador da Bahia, both dressed in all white. Her father, initially critical about their relationship, was present.

== Controversies ==
At late 2005, Mercury, a devout Catholic, was uninvited from a Christmas concert in the Vatican City due to her endorsement of a Ministry of Health campaign encouraging young people to use condoms. Church officials feared she would use the occasion to promote the use of condoms.

In 2006, Mercury openly opposed Luiz Inácio Lula da Silva's reelection. This drew criticism from other artists, such as Zeca Baleiro, who accused her of being favored by the late Antônio Carlos Magalhães, a controversial oligarch from Bahia (which she denied vehemently). Later that same year, in an interview with Folha de S.Paulo, Mercury declared she was against reelections in general. She also said that she voted for Lula four times and that she was disappointed "by his first term (...), shocked with all these scandals". However, she said that she hoped that "Brazil would now have the four years of Lula that we hoped for in his first term."

== Philanthropy ==
d at a large number of charitable events. She is the second Brazilian honored as an ambassador for UNICEF (Renato Aragão was the first). She is also an ambassador for UNAIDS and UNESCO. She has performed at Rede Globo's annual charity Criança Esperança for fifteen consecutive years (1992–2007). She also represents various non-profit organizations including Caravana da Musica which has spawned her own Instituto Sol da Liberdade.

== Discography ==
Studio albums

- Daniela Mercury (a.k.a. "Swing da Cor") (1991)
- O Canto da Cidade (1992)
- Música de Rua (1994)
- Feijão com Arroz (1996)
- Sol da Liberdade (2000)
- Sou de Qualquer Lugar (2001)
- Carnaval Eletrônico (2004)
- Balé Mulato (2005)
- Canibália (2009)
- Daniela Mercury & Cabeça de Nós Todos (2013)
- Vinil Virtual (2015)
- Perfume (2020)
- Baiana (2022)
- Cirandaia (2025)

== Tours ==
- Swing da Cor Tour (1991–1992)
- O Canto da Cidade Tour (1992–1994)
- Música de Rua Tour (1995–1996)
- Feijão com Arroz Tour (1996–1997)
- Elétrica Tour (1998–1999)
- Sol da Liberdade Tour (2000–2001)
- Sou de Qualquer Lugar Tour (2002)
- Eletrodoméstico Tour (2003)
- Carnaval Eletrônico Tour (2004)
- Balé Mulato Tour (2006–2009)
- Canibália Tour (2009–2012)
- Couché Tour (2013)
- Pelada Tour (2014)
- Baile da Rainha Má Tour (2015–2017)
- O Axé, a Voz e o Violão Tour (2016–2017)

== See also ==
- List of best-selling Latin music artists
- Women in Latin music
