= Balé Mulato =

Studio album by Daniela Mercury
- Released: October 25, 2005
- Genres: Axé, MPB
- Label: EMI

Daniela Mercury chronology
Clássica (2005)	Balé Mulato (2005)	Baile Barroco (2006)

Singles from Balé Mulato
- 1. "Levada Brasileira" Released: 2005; 2. "Topo do Mundo" Released: 2006; 3. "Olha o Gandhi Aí" Released: 2006

Professional ratings
Review scores
Source	Rating
Allmusic	4/5 stars

Balé Mulato (Portuguese for Mulatto ballet) is the eighth studio album by Brazilian axé/MPB singer Daniela Mercury, released in 2005 in Brazil through EMI. Although it was not very successful in music charts, it sold almost 60,000 copies in Brazil, earning a gold certification.

== Track listing ==
No.	Title	Writer(s)	Length
1.	"Topo do Mundo"	Jauperi, Gigi	3:05
2.	"Levada Brasileira"	Pierre Onasis, Edilson	3:35
3.	"Amor de Ninguém (O Amor)"	Jorge Papapa	3:52
4.	"Balé Popular"	Onassis, Edilson	3:44
5.	"Toneladas de Amor" (featuring Márcio Mello)	Mello	4:06
6.	"Nem Tudo Funciona de Verdade"	Tenison Del Rey, Gerson Guimarães	2:31
7.	"Pensar em Você"	Chico César	3:12
8.	"Quero Ver o Mundo Sambar"	Daniela Mercury	4:05
9.	"Aquarela do Brasil"	Ary Barroso	4:32
10.	"Meu Pai Oxalá"	Vinícius de Morais, Toquinho	2:57
11.	"Eu Queria"	Onassis, Xel Guima, Edilson	3:26
12.	"Sem Querer"	Mercury	4:30
13.	"Olha o Gandhi Aí"	Tonho Matéria, Jo Vieira	3:41
14.	"Água do Céu"	Mercury, Jorge Zarath	3:53

== Charts ==
Year	Song	Chart
Year	Song	Brazil
2005	"Olha o Gandhi Aí"	46
2005	"Topo do Mundo"	16
2006	"Levada Brasileira"	04

== Certification ==
Region	Certification	Certified units/sales
Brazil (Pro-Música Brasil)	Gold	50,000^{*}
^{*} Sales figures based on certification alone.
