= Vânia Abreu =

Brazilian singer

Vânia Abreu is a singer and performer from Brazil. She was born on May 30, 1967, as Vânia Mercury de Almeida. She is the younger sister of Daniela Mercury, a singer in Música popular brasileira (Brazilian popular music). She and her sister performed in local nightclubs, bars, and other venues in their teen years in order to achieve their start as singers.

In the musical environment of São Paulo, she sought a way to mark her presence, show her own voice and style, and, at the same time, establish and affirm her identity as an authentic "Brazilian singer". Her trajectory was not very different from that of other artists: she sang in bars and in trios elétrico, took part in musical groups and festivals, did backing vocals, recorded her participation in other musicians' CDs, compilations, and soundtracks, before being able to produce her own records.

Abreu began her professional performances in 1986 as a backup singer for the band Gerônimo in Salvador, Brazil. In 1994, she was a member of the band, Biss. The next year, she released her self-titled album, Vania Abreu. Her most critically acclaimed album to date is Seio da Bahia, on which she sings classic songs from the Brazilian state, Bahia.

== Discography ==
- Vania Abreu [1995]
- Pra Mim [1996]
- Seio Da Baia [1999]
- Eu Sou a Multidão [2003]
- Pierrot & Colombina - (with Marcelo Quintanilha) [2006]
- Misteriosa Dona Esperança [2007]
