= Ilha de Comandatuba =

Municipality in Bahia, Brazil

Coordinates: 15.3509°S 38.9808°W

Isle of Comandatuba (Ilha de Comandatuba, in Portuguese) is in the municipality of Una, on the south coast of the State of Bahia, Brazil. It's 70 km (43 mi) from Ilhéus' municipality. Hotel Transamérica Ilha de Comandatuba, with its own airport and a small zoo, are located on the island.

The island has 21 km (13 mi) of semi-desert beach, on which fishermen live in rustic houses. The island is a tourist destination for visitors to the city of Una.

The weather is hot and humid. The average annual temperature is about 24°C (75°F), with the average maximum reaching 28°C (82°F) and average minimum 19°C (66°F).

Access is possible through boats from Vila de Comandatuba. To get there one can use road BA-270 or from the airport in the village.

== Distances ==
- Una: 15 km (9.3 mi)
- Ilhéus: 75 km (47 mi)
- Salvador: 542 km (337 mi)
