= Samba reggae =

Brazilian music genre

Samba-reggae
- Stylistic origins: Samba; reggae fusion
- Cultural origins: between 1987 and 1994, Bahia, Brazil
- Typical instruments: Guitar - Bass - Drums - Brass instrument - Agogô - Percussion instrument - Atabaque - Pandeiro - Cavaquinho
- Derivative forms: Axé

Regional scenes
- Brazil

Other topics
- Music of Brazil

Samba-reggae is a music genre from Bahia, Brazil. Samba reggae, as its name suggests, was originally derived as a blend of Brazilian samba with Jamaican reggae as typified by Bob Marley.

== History and background ==
Samba-reggae arose in the context of the black pride movement that occurred in the city of Salvador de Bahia, around 69, and it still carries connotations of ethnic identity and pride for Afro-Brazilians today. Bahia's population has a large proportion of dark-skinned Brazilians who are descendants of African slaves who were brought to Brazil by the Portuguese in the 17th and 18th centuries. These Afro-Brazilians played a major role in the early development of samba, which first took form in a Bahian style of dance and music called "samba de roda", probably in the late 19th century. Samba de roda was brought to Rio de Janeiro by Bahians around 1900, where it was combined with harmonic and rhythmic elements from European influences (such as chorinho and military marches). By the 1930s, samba de roda had developed into the faster, more harmonically complex Rio-style samba that is now played in Rio's Carnival. Through the middle of the 20th century this new Rio-style samba spread throughout Brazil. Of note, the low pitch bass that was heard on beats 1 and 3, and the higher pitched surdo on beats 2 and 4 in Bahia, brought by the slaves, was changed in Samba-the low pitch was moved to beats 2 and 4.

The paradoxical result was that samba was brought back to Bahia from Rio, but now in a highly altered form, and no longer associated with Afro-Brazilians. Thus, in the mid-20th century, the city of Salvador had many samba schools that were modeled on the samba schools of Rio, as well as blocos (informal street percussion groups), both of which performed Rio-style samba in Carnival parades every year. Yet, ironically, black Brazilians did not participate in these Carnival parades or in the blocos, since they were not allowed to participate.

Samba-reggae represents an effort by black Brazilians to develop a Carnival parade music that they could call their own, and to form all-black or mostly-black blocos with which they could parade during Carnival. The afro bloco music was very different because they aimed to recreate and strengthen their community through their music.

== History ==
=== Ilê Aiyê ===
Ilê Aiyê, was founded in 1974. Like many blocos, they are not just a large band but also a community group with an active social focus. They paraded in the 1975 Carnival, with a new music that was quite literally a blend of samba and reggae. Ilê Aiyê's founders aimed to create a music blending influences from the revered Jamaican artists, Bob Marley and Jimmy Cliff, with elements of the older, Bahian style of samba (samba de roda). Ilê Aiyê wanted to distinguish their music from the increasingly rapid samba of Rio de Janeiro, so they deliberately chose a slower tempo than is used in Rio, and avoided the high-pitched percussion instruments that are particularly associated with the Rio Carnival (cuíca and tamborim). These musical choices were consciously made as a political statement. All of Ilê Aiyê's lyrics always have political and social content, and typically profile some aspect of African history.

Many other afro blocos were founded shortly afterwards, and all played the same rhythmic pattern. At the time, it was known simply as "the music of the afro blocos" or "the rhythm of Ile Aiye". Musically, Ilê Aiyê's major innovations to samba were the addition of a new 3rd surdo playing rapid rolls with two mallets, the addition of a reggae backbeat played by the snare drums (caixas), and the creation of a new clave pattern that is a blend of samba-de-roda clave with a reggae backbeat. They retained many aspects of samba, such as samba's 3 surdos, and a repinique (repique) pattern that was played with hand and stick.

=== Olodum ===
The second major development in this new genre occurred in 1979, with the founding of the influential group Olodum. This group was founded as a bloco afro, which is a "Bahian Carnival Association highlighting African heritage through music, dance theater, and art." By 1986 they had established themselves as the premier performers of a new genre of music. Olodum was led during these years by the leader Mestre Neguinho do Samba, who had previously been drum leader for Ilê Aiyê. Neguinho introduced a key innovation: the old, samba-derived, style of playing the repinique, with hand and stick, was eliminated, and the repiniques switched instead to playing rapid rolls with two wood or plastic rods. This style of playing is derived from Candomblé, an Afro-Brazilian religion. The resulting rapid-fire clatter of the repiniques, along with the distinctive driving roll of the 3rd surdo, gives samba-reggae an unmistakable sound.

During the carnival of 1986, this new style of music, known as samba-reggae, made its debut. Olodum had combined the traditional samba with sounds from a number of other Caribbean music genres, including: merengue, salsa, and reggae. The toques, or "drumming patterns", that categorized the samba-reggae beat was composed of "a pattern in which the surdo bass drums divided themselves into four or five interlocking parts. Against this, the high-pitched repiques and caixes filled out the pattern with fixed and repeated rhythms in a slow tempo, imitating the shuffle feel of reggae." In 1986, the phrase "samba-reggae" was used for the first time to describe the music of Olodum, and, by extension, of the other afro blocos as well. Olodum became progressively more well known, and recorded with Paul Simon, Michael Jackson, Pet Shop Boys and many prominent Brazilian musicians. Over time, most afro blocos converted to Olodum's style of playing the repinique. In the 1990s, Ilê Aiyê finally converted to the Olodum two-rod style.

=== Timbalada, Axé, and modern samba-reggae ===
In the 1990s, the samba-reggae genre continued to evolve with the group Timbalada, which, under the musical direction of Carlinhos Brown, revived the nearly-extinct folk drum timbal (a tall, high-pitched hand drum) and begin to use it in stage shows. Timbalada also developed a rack of 3 surdos and 1 repinique that could be mounted on a stage and played by a single player. This device is known as a "bateria de surdo", a drumset of surdos. (The 3rd and 4th surdo parts were combined in a single drum.) Timbalada is a stage band and not exactly a Carnival street bloco, though they first appeared in the Carnival of 1992. Their music is considered to be a blend of samba-reggae with African elements. Many afro blocos now use the timbal, as well the rack of 3 surdos for stage situations that do not involve parades.

In the 1990s, a style of pop music that was influenced by samba-reggae in its creation, is known as Axé Music (ah-SHEH) was popularized by such Bands and singers as Banda Reflexus, Daniela Mercury, Margareth Menezes and others.

== Musical characteristics: General characteristics ==
Samba-reggae is played in medium tempo around 90-120 beats per minute. The surdos (bass drums) play a 2/4 rhythm with swing time while other instruments provide contrasting rhythms in straight and syncopated time. On the whole, samba-reggae is straighter (less syncopated), slower, and less swung than Rio-style samba. There are many styles of samba-reggae, distinguished by different clave patterns. Olodum's three original styles (samba-reggae, reggae, and merengue) are still played today. Ile Aiye sometimes still plays its old version of samba-reggae; and in addition, Ile Aiye also frequently plays merengue-like patterns that are known in North America as "afrosamba". In addition, samba-reggae groups may also play styles derived from the original Bahian samba-de-roda, from its modern urban descendant ("samba duro"), or from axé pop music.

== Instrumentation ==
There are typical 3 or 4 surdo (bass drum) parts in samba-reggae. The surdos are 50 cm deep, shorter drum than the classic Rio size of 60 cm. Surdos in samba-reggae are usually worn quite low on the body with a waist strap; in Rio they are more likely to be worn higher and with a shoulder strap. In samba-reggae, the first (largest-diameter) and second (next largest) surdos keep the beat, typically with the lowest drum hitting beat 2 and the higher drum hitting beat 1. Together, the first and second surdos of samba-reggae are known as the "fundos", the back, presumably because they always stand in the back row of the samba-reggae band. The third surdo plays the classic third-surdo part of samba. The fourth surdo is tuned very tightly and plays rapid 16th-note rolls with two mallets, which gives samba-reggae its unmistakable rumbling sound. Some modern afro blocos are eliminating the third-surdo part or combining it with the fourth-surdo part.

The rest of a samba-reggae band is usually composed primarily of snare drums (caixas), and repiniques (a slightly longer, high-pitched drum with no snare/strings; also called "repique"). These may play a reggae backbeat, son clave, bossa clave, "Brazilian clave" (Mocidade/merengue style), or a variety of other clave patterns, depending on the particular piece of music being played. Samba-reggae repiniques are typically 25-cm or 20-cm (10-inch, 8-inch) in diameter so are slightly smaller-diameter than the 30-cm (12-inch) repiniques of Rio, and are worn lower down on the body, and are played with two long plastic sticks. The repinique may also play loud variations, rolls, and improvisation fills, similar to the role of the third surdo in Rio-style samba. It also plays call-ins to start the entire band. Typically only 1 lead repinique player does these fills and calls; other players do not alter their parts outside of their set arrangement. A drum leader, or mestre, leads the entire band with hand cues and/or a whistle. In Olodum, the mestre typically leads with hand cues only and no whistle; this was Neguinho's style of leading.

Olodum only uses caixas, repiniques and surdos. Other groups may incorporate additional instruments, such as timbal, atabaque, and tamborim.

Samba-reggae bands frequently number 100 drummers or more, plus an amplified singer and a small band who ride on a sound truck.

== Dance ==
Samba-reggae has given rise to a style of African-influenced dance derived from Afro-Brazilian and candomble dance moves. In a social setting, samba-reggae dances tend to be done in a follow-the-leader fashion, with a few skilled dancers initiating moves in a line in front of the crowd, and the whole crowd then following along. In addition, samba-reggae drummers often dance while they drum. The third- and fourth-surdos do short choreographies, using their mallets to emphasize arm moves. Most dramatically, the fundos (first and second surdos) frequently take center stage to do elaborate, showy mallet lifts and throws, and tossing their huge drums high overhead.
