= Francis Hime =

Brazilian musician (born 1939)

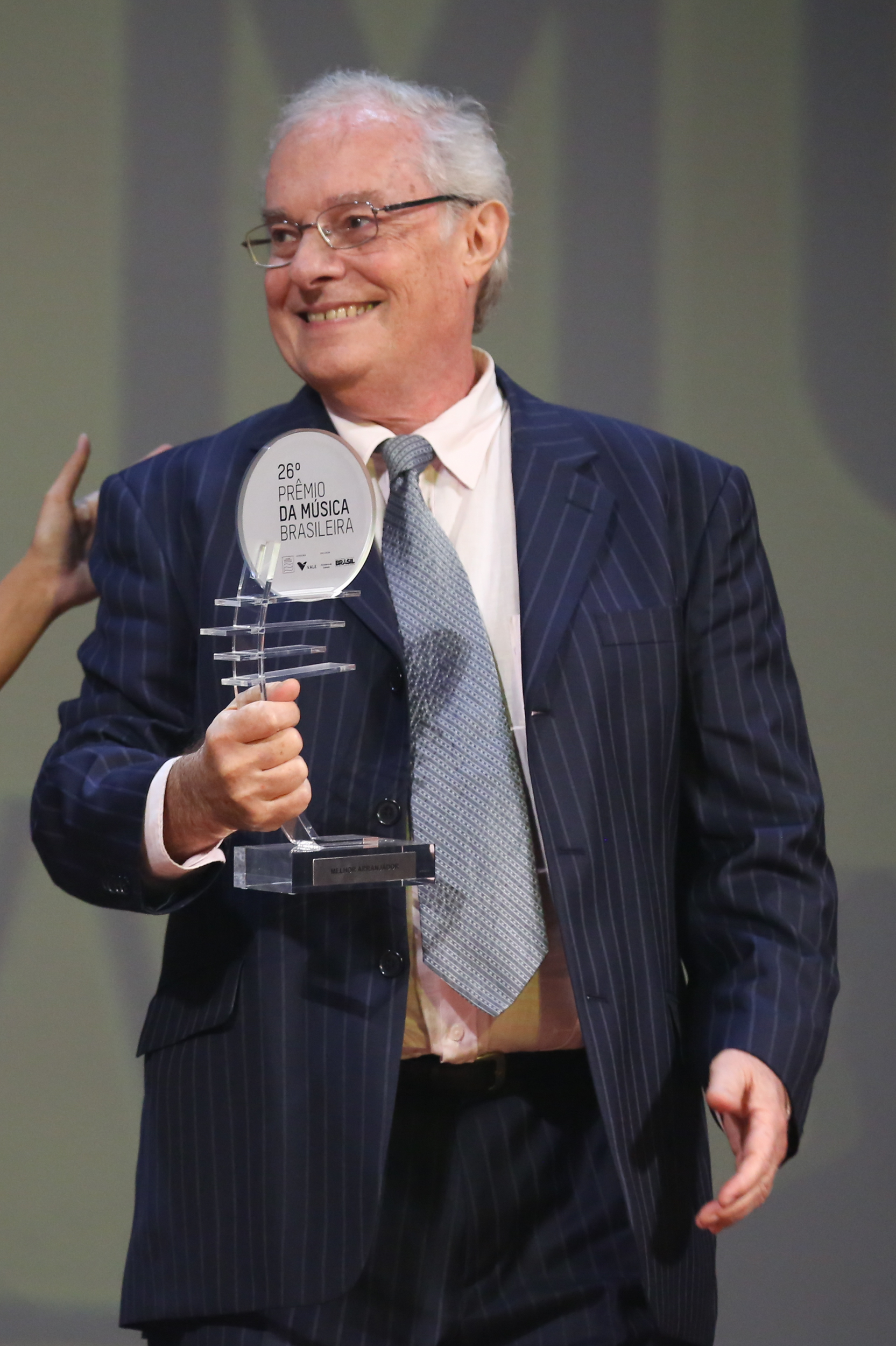
- Image of Francis Hime

Background information
- Born: Francis Victor Walter Hime; 31 August 1939 (age 87)
- Origin: Rio de Janeiro, Brazil
- Genres: Bossa nova, Samba, Choro, Brazilian music
- Instrument: Piano
- Spouse: Olivia Hime

Francis Hime (Rio de Janeiro, August 31, 1939) is a Brazilian composer, arranger, pianist and singer. He is the composer of "Minha/All Mine", recorded, among others, by Bill Evans, Tony Bennett and Eliane Elias.

== Biography ==
Francis Hime started his piano studies at the age of 6. In 1955, he moved to the city of Lausanne, Switzerland, where he remained until 1959, dedicating himself to music. Francis returned to Brazil to develop a friendship with some of the artists who were part of the already consolidated bossa nova movement, such as Vinícius de Moraes, Carlos Lyra, Baden Powell, Edu Lobo, Dori Caymmi, Wanda Sá and Marcos Valle. His first partnership of this time with Vinícius, "Sem mais adeus", was recorded at the time by Wanda Sá and later by several other interpreters.

In 1969, he graduated in Mechanical Engineering and married singer and lyricist Maria Olívia Leuenroth, later known as Olivia Hime, with whom he would have his daughters: Maria, Joana and Luiza. In the same year, Francis moved to the United States, where he continued his musical studies and stayed for four years.

His vast repertoire includes several songs, soundtracks for movies and theater, and also erudite music.

== Discography ==
- 1964 – Os Seis em Ponto
- 1973 – Francis Hime
- 1977 – Passaredo
- 1978 – Se Porém Fosse Portanto
- 1980 – Francis
- 1981 – Os Quatro Mineiros
- 1981 – Sonho de Moço
- 1982 – Pau Brasil
- 1985 – Clareando
- 2000 – Sinfonia do Rio de Janeiro de São Sebastião
- 2001 – Meus Caros Pianistas
- 2001 – Sinfonia do Rio de Janeiro de São Sebastião – DVD
- 2002 – Choro Rasgado
- 2003 – Brasil Lua Cheia
- 2003 – Brasil Lua Cheia – DVD
- 2004 – Álbum Musical
- 2005 – Essas Parcerias
- 2006 – Arquitetura da Flor
- 2007 – Francis Ao Vivo
- 2007 – CHORO – DVD
