= Swing da Cor =

Single by Daniela Mercury featuring Olodum

from the album Daniela Mercury
- Released: 1991
- Genre: Axé
- Length: 3:38
- Label: Eldorado
- Songwriter: Luciano Gomes

Daniela Mercury featuring Olodum singles chronology
"Swing da Cor" (1991)	"Menino do Pelô" (1991)

"Swing da Cor" (Portuguese for "Swing of the Color") is a song written by Luciano Gomes and originally recorded in 1991 by the Brazilian singer Daniela Mercury, in her first solo album Daniela Mercury. The song is featuring Olodum, it was released as the first single of the album and made a huge success all over Brazil, reaching No. 1 on Billboard Hot 100 Brazil.

== Formats and track listings ==
- Holland CD single
1. "Swing da Cor" - 3:35
2. "Swing da Cor" (Extended Mix) - 5:52
3. "Swing da Cor" (Club Mix) - 5:01
- French CD single
1. "Swing da Cor" - 3:35
2. "Swing da Cor" (Extended Mix) - 5:52
