= Carnaval Eletrônico =

Studio album by Daniela Mercury
- Released: Jun 10, 2004
- Genre: Axé, Electro
- Length: 58:23
- Label: BMG

Daniela Mercury chronology
MTV ao Vivo - Eletrodoméstico (2003)	Carnaval Eletrônico (2004)	Clássica (2005)

Singles from Carnaval Eletrônico
- 1. "Maimbê Dandá" Released: 2004; 2. "Amor de Carnaval" Released: 2004; 3. "Vou Batê Pra Tu" Released: 2004

Professional ratings
Review scores
Source	Rating
Allmusic	3/5 stars

Carnaval Eletrônico (English: Electronic Carnival) is the seventh studio album by Brazilian singer Daniela Mercury, released on June 10, 2004 on BMG Brazil.

== Track listing ==
No.	Title	Writer(s)	Length
1.	"Maimbê Dandá" (featuring Carlinhos Brown)	Brown, Mateus	5:26
2.	"Quero Ver O Mundo Sambar" (featuring DJ Renato Lopes)	Mercury	6:34
3.	"Vou Batê Pá Tu" (featuring DJ Zé Pedro)	Orlandivo, Rodrigues	4:19
4.	"Que Baque é Esse?" (featuring Marcelinho Da Lua)	Lenine	4:29
5.	"A Tonga da Mironga Do Kabuletê" (featuring DJ Ramilson Maia)	DeMoraes, Toquinho	4:35
6.	"O Canto da Rainha" (featuring DJ Memê)	DJ Memê, Mercury	7:25
7.	"Amor de Carnaval" (featuring Gilberto Gil)	Gil	3:42
8.	"Por Trás da Fantasia" (featuring DJ Zé Pedro)	Quintanilha	3:31
9.	"Preto e Branco"	Diniz, Fagundes	5:35
10.	"Charles Ylê" (featuring Carlinhos Brown)	Brown	4:39
11.	"Ago Lonan (Instrumental)" (featuring DJ Anderson Noise)	Traditional	4:52
12.	"Quero Voltar Pra Bahia"	Diniz, Odibar	3:16
