= O Canto da Cidade (song) =

Single by Daniela Mercury

from the album O Canto da Cidade
- Released: 1992
- Genre: Axé
- Length: 3:24
- Label: Epic / Sony Music
- Songwriters: Daniela Mercury, Tote Gira
- Producer: Liminha

Daniela Mercury singles chronology
"Menino do Pelô" (1991)	"O Canto da Cidade" (1992)	"O Mais Belo dos Belos" (1992)

"O Canto da Cidade" (Portuguese for "The Chant of the Town") is a song co-written and performed by Brazilian singer Daniela Mercury. It is the title track and lead single of her second studio album, which was released in 1992. The song became a huge success in Brazil and it is widely known as one of Mercury's signature songs.

== Song information ==
The lyrics of "O Canto da Cidade", which were written by Mercury herself and Tote Gira, are quite simple. They are basically about a girl advising a partner that she is trying to leave her – or a possible love interest, depending on the point of view – that he should stay with her, because she is the "chant" and the "color" of the town they live in.

== Music video ==
The music video of "O Canto da Cidade" was directed by Patrícia Prata. It begins with Mercury singing the song while she walks through the streets of her native Salvador. As the beat of the song gets faster, Mercury starts to dance. There are also some other scenes of Mercury (wearing a dress similar to the one on the album's cover) and others dancing in yellow, black and white backgrounds.

== Chart performance ==
"O Canto da Cidade" was released as the first single from the eponymous album in mid-1992. The song, as well as the album, is widely regarded as responsible for taking both Mercury's career and axé music to mainstream audiences. The song stayed 12 weeks at #1.

== Legacy ==
"O Canto da Cidade" is remembered for being the number one song in Brazil at the time of Fernando Collor's impeachment process and the subsequent economic crisis. Nelson Motta states, in his book Noites Tropicais, that Mercury and her song were responsible for bringing back some of the country's joy and self-esteem at a time of harsh crisis. At a recent concert in Goiânia, Mercury stated that during the crisis the new generation regained interest in the Brazilian popular music and that her song was, in part, responsible for this.

== Awards ==
In late 1992, "O Canto da Cidade" received a special Sharp Award for Song of the Year.

== Formats and track listing ==
Brazil - Vinyl single

- A. "O Canto da Cidade" - 3:22
- B. "O Canto da Cidade" - 3:22

Spain - Vinyl single

1. "O Canto da Cidade" - 3:22

Italy - Vinyl single remixes

- A1. "O Canto da Cidade" (Radio Mix) - 4:33
- A2. "O Canto da Cidade" (Ultimate Club Mix) - 6:54
- B1. "O Canto da Cidade" (Murk Boys Miami Mix) - 4:35
- B2. "O Canto da Cidade" (Original Version) - 3:22
- B3. "O Canto da Cidade" (Ultimate Dub) - 6:48

Vinyl single remixes

- A1. "O Canto da Cidade" (Radio Mix) - 4:33
- A2. "O Canto da Cidade" (Ultimate Club Mix) - 6:54
- B1. "O Canto da Cidade" (Murk Boys Miami Mix) - 4:35
- B2. "O Canto da Cidade" (Original Version) - 3:22
- B3. "O Canto da Cidade" (Ultimate Dub) - 6:48
- C1. "O Canto da Cidade" (Radio Groove) - 3:33
- C2. "O Canto da Cidade" (NU Solution Dub) - 6:06
- C3. "O Canto da Cidade" (S-Man's Tribal Bonus) - 5:07
- D1. "O Canto da Cidade" (Murk Boys Habana Mix) - 5:03
- D2. "O Canto da Cidade" (Direct Groove Mix) - 5:40
- D3. "O Canto da Cidade" (Oscar G's Dope Mix) - 3:35

Portugal - CD single

1. "O Canto da Cidade" (from "Elétrica") - 3:44
