= O Canto da Cidade =

Studio album by Daniela Mercury
- Released: September 20, 1992 (Brazil); March 23, 1993 (North America/Europe)
- Genres: Axé, MPB
- Length: 42:04
- Label: Epic (Sony Music)
- Producer: Liminha

Daniela Mercury chronology
| Daniela Mercury (1991) | O Canto da Cidade (1992) | Música de Rua (1994) |

Singles from O Canto da Cidade
- 1. "O Canto da Cidade" Released: 1992; 2. "O Mais Belo dos Belos" Released: 1992; 3. "Batuque" Released: 1992; 4. "Você Não Entende Nada/Cotidiano" Released: 1993; 5. "Só Pra Te Mostrar" Released: 1993; 6. "Bandidos da América" Released: 1993

Professional ratings
Review scores
| Source | Rating |
|---|---|
| Allmusic | 3/5 stars |

O Canto da Cidade ("The Chant of the Town") is the second studio album by Brazilian axé/MPB singer Daniela Mercury, released in 1992 in Brazil and on March 23, 1993, in North America and Europe through Sony Music.

== Background ==
Later in 1992, Daniela Mercury went to a project called "Som do Meio-Dia" (Midday Sound), when she played at the Art Museum of São Paulo (MASP). The show brought together over thirty thousand spectators, which eventually leave the traffic jam in the vicinity of the Paulista Avenue. After a forty-minute concert, Daniela was removed from the stage by representatives of the São Paulo tourist office, that concerned with the museum structure, obtained an order from the military police to remove it from the local.

Soon after the show, Daniela was hired by Sony Music label and through this, released her second solo album, O Canto da Cidade. The album was considered by journalist André Domingues one of the best MPB albums ever. O Canto da Cidade is Mercury's album with most number-one songs (four in total; "O Canto da Cidade", "O Mais Belo dos Belos", "Batuque" and "Você Não Entende Nada/Cotidiano"). The songs "Só Pra Te Mostrar", a duet with Herbert Vianna, and "Bandidos da América" made a moderate success in the Brazilian radio stations, reaching number nine and twenty-one in the charts, respectively. O Canto da Cidade is recognized as the album responsible for taking Axé Music to mainstream audiences in Brazil.

The album also yielded Mercury, a year-end special on Rede Globo channel, which were mixed with live performances in the square of Apotheosis in Rio de Janeiro, and video clips with Caetano Veloso, Herbert Vianna and Tom Jobim. Years later, the special, previously unreleased in video was released on DVD to celebrate the 15th anniversary of the release of the album. In July 1993, Mercury was one of Brazil's attractions at the prestigious Montreux Jazz Festival in Switzerland.

Some consider O Canto da Cidade was the forerunner of the samba-reggae movement, then called Axé Music, gaining strength in all regions of the country and allowing other genre artists, were featured in the Brazilian music scene. It is believed that after this album, the Carnival of Bahia gained a massive media coverage. Mercury experienced during this period, a peak of popularity rarely seen in the history of Brazilian music industry, being dubbed "the hurricane of Bahia" and "Queen of the Axé".

== Track listing ==
| No. | Title | Writer(s) | Length |
|---|---|---|---|
| 1. | "O Canto da Cidade" | Daniela Mercury, Tote Gira | 3:22 |
| 2. | "Batuque" | Rey Zulu, Genivaldo Evangelista | 3:21 |
| 3. | "Você Não Entende Nada/Cotidiano" | Caetano Veloso, Chico Buarque | 3:04 |
| 4. | "Bandidos da América" | Jorge Portugal | 3:25 |
| 5. | "Geração Perdida" | Daniela Mercury, Ramon Cruz, Toni Augusto | 4:11 |
| 6. | "Só Pra Te Mostrar" (featuring Herbert Vianna) | Herbert Vianna | 3:57 |
| 7. | "O Mais Belo dos Belos (A Verdade do Ilê/O Charme da Liberdade)" | Guiguio, Valter Farias, Adailton Poesia | 3:31 |
| 8. | "Rosa Negra" | Jorge Xaréu | 3:21 |
| 9. | "Vem Morar Comigo" | Mercury, Durval Lelys | 3:35 |
| 10. | "Exótica das Artes" | Armandinho Macedo, Edmundo Caroso | 3:29 |
| 11. | "Rimas Irmãs" | Carlinhos Brown | 3:42 |
| 12. | "Monumento Vivo" | Moraes Moreira, Davi Moraes | 3:06 |

== Notes ==
- "Você Não Entende Nada" contains "Cotidiano" by Chico Buarque as incidental song.

== Awards ==
- Sharp Awards – Special award for best song ("O Canto da Cidade")
- Sharp Awards – Award for best female singer (regional)

== Sales and certifications ==
| Region | Certification | Certified units/sales |
|---|---|---|
| Argentina | — | 45,000 |
| Brazil (Pro-Música Brasil) | Diamond | 1,000,000^{*} |
^{*} Sales figures based on certification alone.

== Release history ==
| Region | Date |
|---|---|
| Brazil | September 20, 1992 |
| Canada | March 23, 1993 |
| United States | March 23, 1993 |
| Mexico | March 23, 1993 |

== See also ==
- List of best-selling Latin albums
