= Ilê Pérola Negra (song) =

2000 single by Daniela Mercury

"Ilê Pérola Negra (O Canto do Negro)"

Single by Daniela Mercury

from the album Sol da Liberdade
- Released: 2000
- Genre: Axé
- Length: 5:53
- Label: BMG
- Songwriters: Miltão/Guiguio, Rene Veneno

Daniela Mercury singles chronology
"Trio Metal" (1998)	"Ilê Pérola Negra (O Canto do Negro)" (2000)	"Santa Helena" (2000)

"Ilê Pérola Negra (O Canto do Negro)" (Portuguese for "Ilê Dark Pearl (The chant of the Black") is a song recorded by the brazilian singer Daniela Mercury. The song was originally released in 2000 as the first single of the album Sol da Liberdade, Mercury's fifth studio album.

== Information ==
The song is, actually, the combination of two different songs: "O Canto do Negro" written by Miltão and "Pérola Negra" written by Guiguio and Rene Veneno. The lyric of "Ilê Pérola Negra (O Canto do Negro)" basically praises the wealth of the African brazilian culture, especially of Bahia, which is notable on the made reference to Ilê Aiyê.

== Success ==
As soon as was released, the song turns into one of the most played songs on brazilian radios, reaching #1 on the Billboard Hot 100 Brazil.

== Music video ==
The music video for the song make use of the contrast of the colours black and white. Daniela Mercury appears on the video wearing a white dress, covered with a white veil, and a black dress also covered with a black veil, on a dune in front of the sea. There's some scenes with people dancing and playing capoeira on the same beach, wearing orishas costumes.

In 2000, the video won the award of Best Axé Video on MTV Video Music Brazil.

== Formats and track listings ==
- Brazilian CD single
1. "Ilê Pérola Negra (O Canto do Negro)" - 5:54
2. "Ilê Pérola Negra (O Canto do Negro)" (Edit) - 4:33
- European CD single
1. "Ilê Pérola Negra (O Canto do Negro)" (Edit) - 4:33
2. "Ilê Pérola Negra" (Spanish Version) - 4:02
3. "Ilê Pérola Negra (O Canto do Negro)" (Pablo Flores Club Radio Edit) - 4:28
4. "Ilê Pérola Negra (O Canto do Negro)" (Pablo Flores Club Mix) - 10:37
