= Olivia Hime =

Brazilian singer and lyricist (born 1943)

- Born: Maria Olivia Leuenroth Hime; June 25, 1943 (age 82); Rio de Janeiro, Brazil
- Origin: Rio de Janeiro, Brazil
- Occupations: Singer and lyricist
- Spouse: Francis Hime

Olivia Hime (born June 25, 1943) is a Brazilian singer and lyricist. She is also the co-owner and musical manager of the record label Biscoito Fino. In 2005, the song Cancao Transparente, composed by Hime and her husband, pianist and composer Francis Hime, was nominated for a Latin Grammy Award for Best Brazilian Song.

== Early life and education ==
Hime was a student of the Santa Úrsula.

== Career ==
Hime composed five songs on her husband's first LP, produced by Dori Caymmi. The compositions were created in partnership with her husband. Together, they run their own compositions A Tarde and Almamúsica.

== Personal life ==
Hime is married to composer Francis Hime. He left his engineering career to become a musician and was inspired by Vinícius de Moraes. The couple has three daughters: Luiza, Joana and Maria.

== Discography ==
- Palavra de Guerra Ao Vivo — CD & DVD (2008)
- Palavras de Guerra (2007)
- Canção Transparente (2004)
- Mar de Algodão (2002)
- Olivia Hime canta Chiquinha Gonzaga — Serenata de Uma Mulher (2002)
- Alta Madrugada (1997)
- Estrela da Vida Inteira (1987)
- O Fio da Meada (1985)
- Máscara (1983)
- Segredo do meu coração (1982)
- Olivia Hime (1981)
