= Caetano e Chico: Juntos e Ao Vivo =

Caetano e Chico – Juntos e Ao Vivo

Live album by Caetano Veloso and Chico Buarque
- Released: 1972
- Genre: MPB, tropicália, samba
- Label: Philips
- Producer: Roni Berbert and Guilherme Araújo

Caetano Veloso chronology
Transa (1972)	Caetano e Chico – Juntos e Ao Vivo (1972)	Araçá Azul (1973)

Chico Buarque chronology
Quando o Carnaval Chegar (1972)	Caetano e Chico - juntos e ao vivo (1972)	Chico Canta (1973)

Professional ratings
Review scores
Source	Rating
Allmusic	4/5 stars

Caetano e Chico – juntos e ao vivo is a 1972 live album by Brazilian musicians Caetano Veloso and Chico Buarque. It was recorded in Salvador's Teatro Castro Alves shortly after Veloso returned from his exile in London, imposed by the ruling Brazilian military dictatorship. Because of the political connotation of the songs and the repressive nature of the regime at the time, audience shouts and clapping were made intentionally louder in some parts of the album which contained verses that the censors had vetoed.

== Track listing ==
1. "Bom Conselho" (Buarque) – 2:00
2. "Partido Alto" (Buarque) – 5:32
3. "Tropicália" (Veloso) – 3:30
4. "Morena dos Olhos d'Água" (Buarque) – 2:32
5. "A Rita"/"Esse Cara" (Buarque/Veloso) – 3:35
6. "Atrás da Porta" (Buarque, Francis Hime) – 2:44
7. "Você Não Entende Nada"/"Cotidiano" (Veloso/Buarque) – 7:01
8. "Bárbara" (Buarque, Ruy Guerra) – 3:50
9. "Ana de Amsterdam" (Buarque, Ruy Guerra) – 1:45
10. "Janelas Abertas Nº2" (Veloso) – 1:56
11. "Os Argonautas" (Veloso) – 3:23
