= Axé =

Afro-brazilian popular music genre

- Native name: Àṣẹ
- Stylistic origins: Samba-reggae; frevo; reggae; merengue; forró; samba duro; pop-rock
- Cultural origins: 1980s, Salvador, Bahia, Brazil
- Typical instruments: Electric guitar; electric bass; timpani; congas; drums

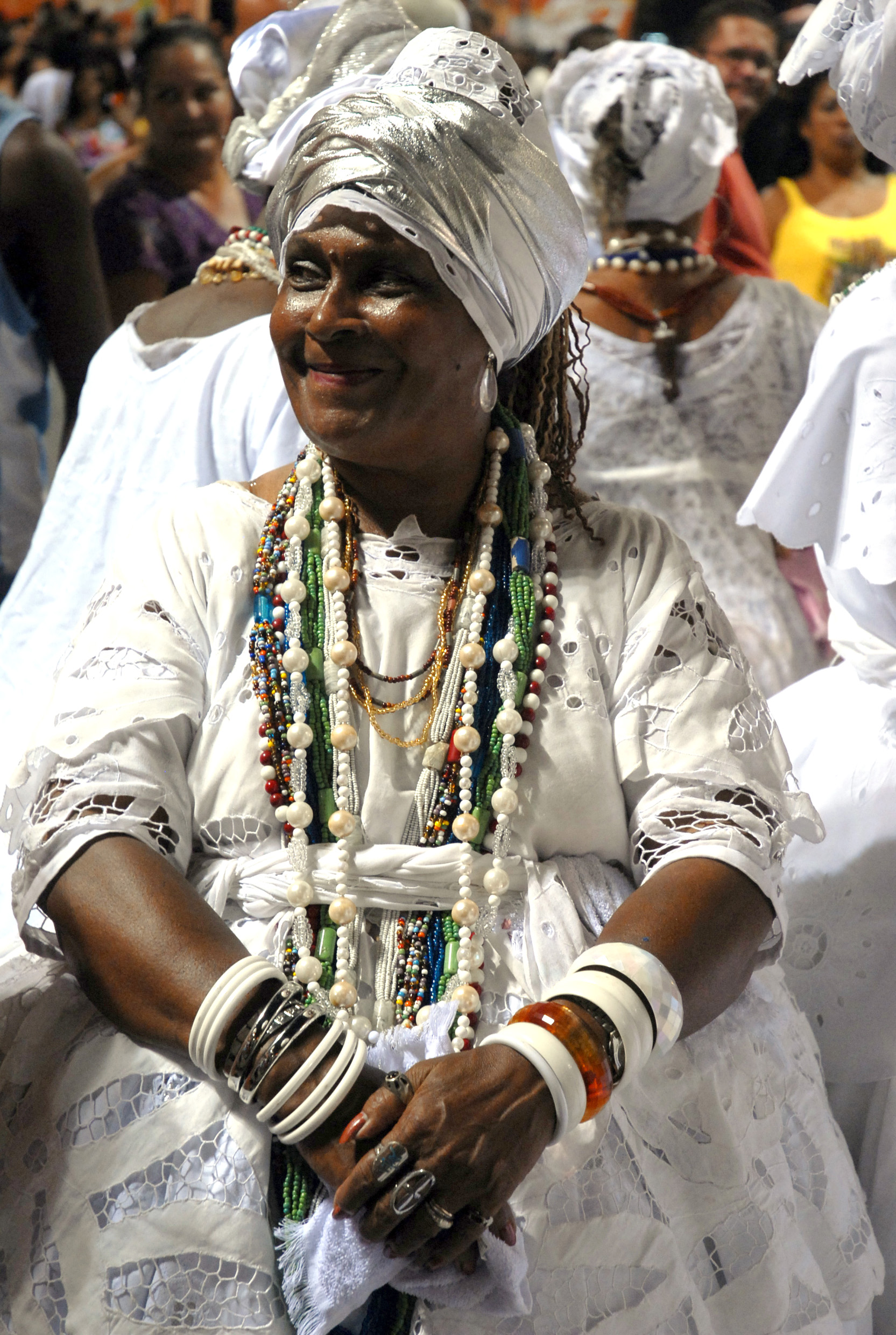
Woman characterized as a "baiana", costume derived from connections to the predominant African culture in Bahia.

Axé (Portuguese pronunciation: [aˈʃɛ]) is a key concept in the regional Candomblé religion, as "the imagined spiritual power and energy bestowed upon practitioners by the pantheon of orixás". It also has ties with the Roman Catholic Church and the Lenten season, which represents the roots of Bahian Carnival.

The concept also gave its name to a popular music genre that originated in Salvador, Bahia, Brazil in the 1980s, fusing different Afro-Caribbean genres, such as marcha, reggae, and calypso. It also includes influences of Brazilian music such as frevo, forró and carixada. The word Axé comes from the Yoruba term àṣẹ, meaning "soul, light, spirit or good vibrations".

== Roots and history ==
Numerous different African cultures were brought to Brazil due to slavery, which lead to the creation of the vibrancy and complexity of Brazil and its culture. Therefore, several of Brazil's popular music styles have derived from African cultures and African diasporic influences, including samba, lambada, funk and axé. There is a tendency by Brazilian musicians to draw inspiration and utilize themes, imagery and symbolic symbols from the Candomblé religion and its African roots. Artists such as Gilberto Gil, Vinicius de Moraes, Caetano Veloso, Sergio Mendes, Daniela Mercury, Carlinhos Brown, among others, have all used African culture, religion and symbols as inspirations and lyrics of their songs.

Following the abolition of slavery in 1888, the celebration of Bahian Carnival was used similarly to Candomblé religion as it celebrated the African heritage, honoring the ancestral spirits and African royalty. Even before this, Catholicism had its roots embedded in Carnival. For example, the Bahian Carnival focuses on specifically celebrating the death and resurrection of Jesus as it leads to the Lenten season in the Roman Catholic calendar. Along with this, Catholic Masses are given ahead of the carnival to wish people positive axé spirit throughout the lenten season. While some perform in Catholic traditions, Candomblé rituals are done as well. They offer foods and liquids as a gift for the orixás for good tidings and a fortunate Carnival season. Another example of Catholic ties to Candomblé is in the early nineteenth century, pre-Lenten celebrations including formal dances for the rich and celebrations with dancing in the streets for the lower class occurred. These actions were prominent in the forming of Carnival as authorities eventually banned the separate types of celebrations having Carnival take its place where both sides of society participated in their own ways.

Axé was a fusion of African and Caribbean styles such as merengue, salsa and reggae, as well as being influenced by other Afro-Brazilian musical styles such as frevo and forró. Axé music was labeled in 1980s, but it was already noticeable in the 50s with the incorporation of the "guitarra baiana" (guitar from Bahia). This genre was purely instrumental, and remained so until the 1970s, when Moraes Moreira (of the band Novos Baianos) went solo.

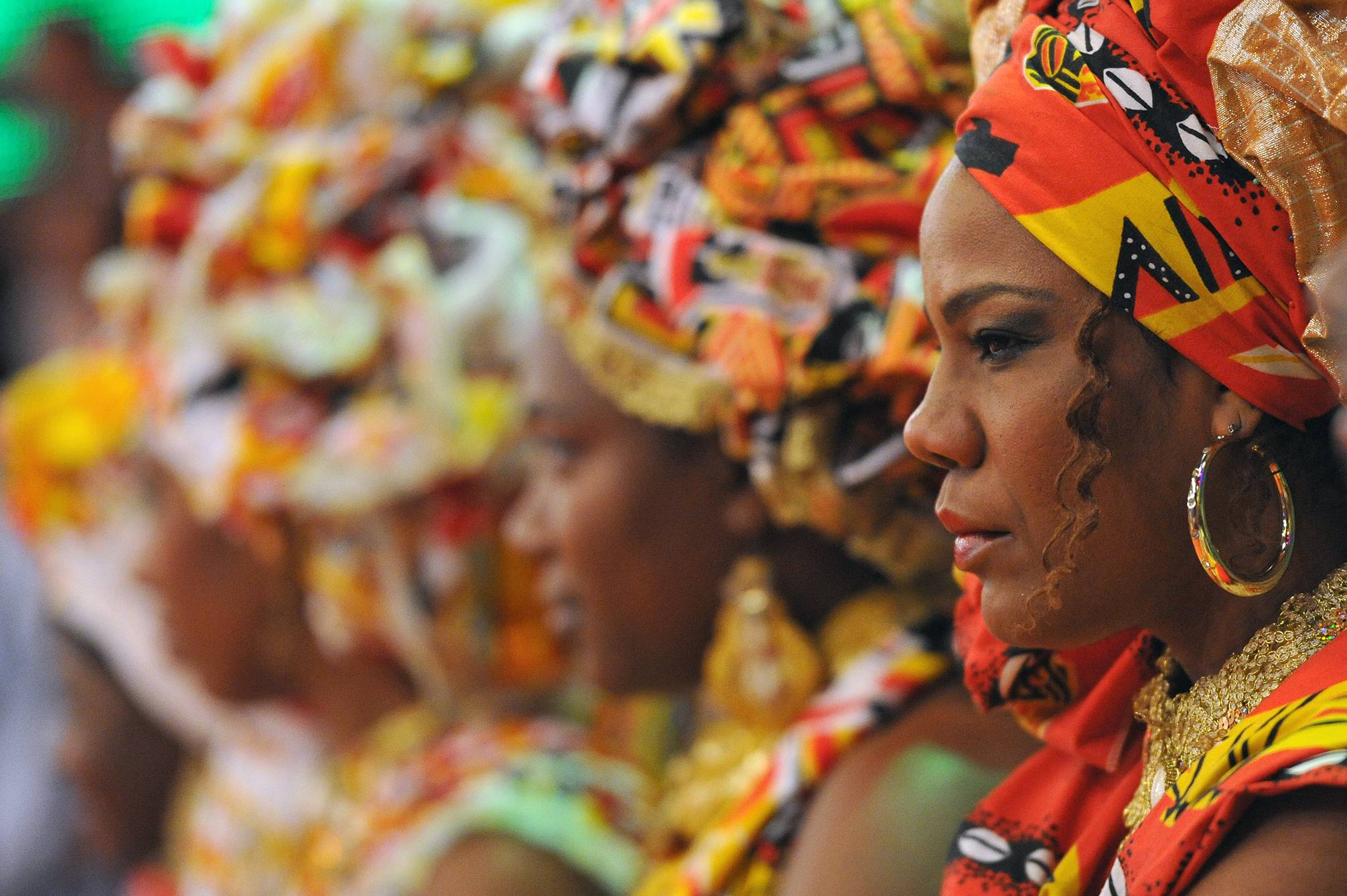
Ilê Aiyê, women symbolic of the Afro-Brazilian culture and community in Salvador, Bahia.

In 1974, carnival in Salvador, Bahia began taking shape. A group of Afro-Brazilians civil rights activists formed Ilê Aiyê, a music ensemble that derived their heavy rhythm from Candomblé's religious ceremonies. Quickly, Ilê Aiyê gained a huge following, allowing them to influence other artists to incorporate the samba-reggae style and the heavy beats to their music. Groups such as Timbalada, Olodum and Filhos de Gandhi also shared the heavy beats and rhythms with Ilê Aiyê, as well as utilizing African symbols such as typical outfits and instruments that all these bands use to perform. Olodum's rehearsals soon became a starting point for up and coming artists, composers, and music. In these rehearsals, artists presented and experimented with their music, in search for legitimacy from the population.

As axé has developed over time, all axé ensembles have had one thing in common: structure. Axé music ensembles usually consist of a lead singer, backup singers, an electric guitar, bass, drum set, keyboards, a percussion section, and sometimes even a horn section. As expressed in the earlier parts of this section, a driving beat, which carries out the dancing aspect of the music, also brings with it lyrics that invite those from mass who want to join these carnival parades. Used as a template of originality in the mid 1980s, axé didn't completely come together until there was a mix of music genres developed by Bahian musicians. For example, samba-reggae, the local rhythm of Salvador's blocos Afro was a prominent example of this combination. The blocos Afro group was formed to oppose prejudice that struck many poor dark-skinned people from several carnival clubs in Salvador in the 1970s. Opposing this prejudice, the signature music style of the blocos Afro gave a valuable meaning to axé and how it is shaped today.

Another example is in 1985, Luiz Caldas released his LP record called Magia, which included the track Fricote. Although the lyrics were not complex, the rhythm was perfect for the climate in Bahia. The song became the representation of the entertainment of Bahia's musicality.

== Axé and Candomblé beads ==
Candomblé beads are a key conduit of axé within the Candomblé religion. These beads are made up of either plastic, glass, or clay, mimic emblems of status, protection, and affiliation with Candomblé in both secular and religious spaces. The beads are consecrated by being bathed in sacred herbs or animal blood, at which point they acquire the spiritual power of axé and form a materialistic representation of their God. Through these beads, they have a variety of functions in the life of persons who give them authority and regard them as essential to their spiritual well-being. When worn publicly, the beads serve as a symbol of one's pride in African Brazilian culture and religious affiliation. In places where Candomblé is viewed unfavorably, this identification either be empowering or it can be potentially deadly.

=== Status ===
In the sacred context, status is indicated by the type and color of the beads. For example, to employ items like dress, color, beads, and jewelry, you must be in a position of status. The beads will increase in size as the owner of the beads moves forward, carrying out their duties over many years, and they'll add valuable items to them. Anyone who is aware of this demonstrates their standing within the Candomblé hierarchy.

=== Protection ===
Wearing Candomblé beads brings one into contact with the axé and enable the beads to withstand strong, possibly harmful forces. Empowerment gives beads the ability to guide and protect as well as harm their owners. For example, as they move through city streets, people frequently wear beads, which serve as representations for their orixá. They rely on these beads for protection in the most trying of circumstances.

== Popularity ==
When Daniela Mercury released O Canto da Cidade in 1992, axé entered the mainstream pop music scene and became one of the most popular genres in Brazil. The song remained in the first position in the charts for months and ended up becoming an anthem for the people in Brazil. O Canto da Cidade opened doors for artists and bands such as Cheiro de Amor, Asa de Águia, Chiclete com Banana and Banda Eva, who launched Ivete Sangalo and led her to embark in her solo career. These bands are still relevant in Brazilian music scene, and still spreads the axé genre across the country and throughout the world.

Two years prior to Daniela Mercury's success, the American and European released Margareth Menezes' Elegibô, which took the style to international audiences.

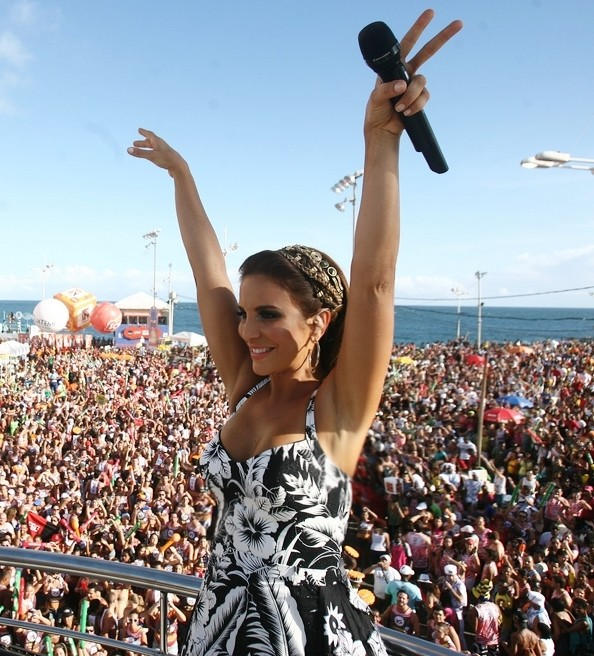
Ivete Sangalo as she performs in Salvador's Carnaval in 2012.

== Axé today ==
Currently, the biggest stars of axé music are Ivete Sangalo and Claudia Leitte. Claudia is known in Latin America for hits like "Beijar na Boca", and was also extremely popular on the Spanish version, "Beso en la Boca", as well as Baldin de Gelo, Carnaval ft. Pitbull and Corazon ft. Daddy Yankee.

== Axé International Exhibition ==
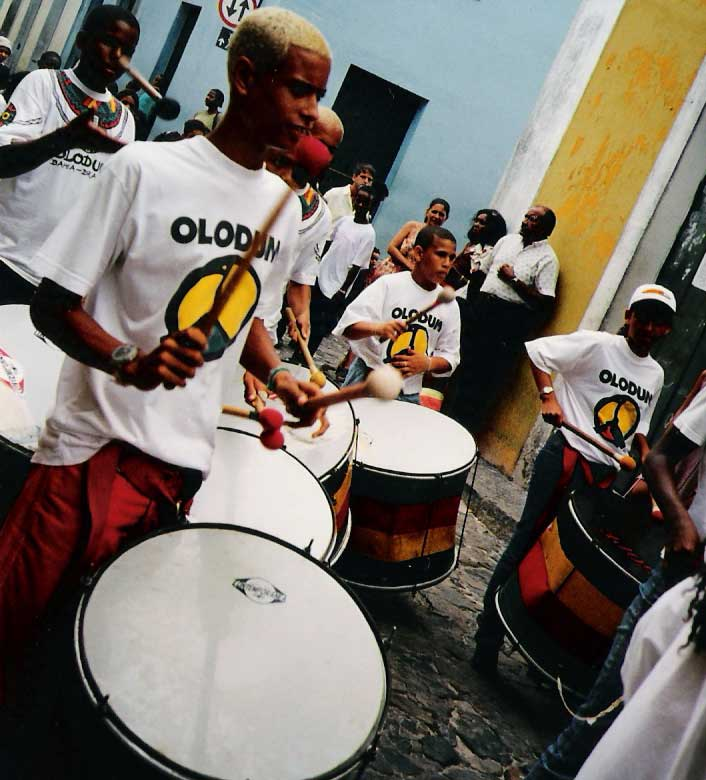
Olodum drummers playing their instruments like in the video clip They Don't Really Care About Us.

In 1990, one of Margareth Menezes's tracks "Elegibô (Uma Historia De Ifa)" was used in the Mickey Rourke film Wild Orchid. This prompted Island Records in the US to release a compilation album of some of her older material from Brazil on their subsidiary label, Mango. The album, simply titled Elegibô, was an instant hit, reaching # 1 on the Billboard World Music chart at a time when David Byrne was championing Brazilian music in the US. The title track itself became a regular staple at clubs playing so-called world music throughout the US and Europe. The album also received a full release in the UK, Germany and France. A single, "Tenda do Amor", was also released from the album in some European territories. Menezes toured internationally on the back of this album, generating a lot of press in the process. A second US-released follow-up album Kindala, released late 1991, but repackaged in some territories from the Brazilian version of the same name, also achieved some success. This release also gave Menezes a minor hit album in France too.

During his time in the city of Salvador, Bahia, Paul Simon encountered the music ensemble Grupo Cultural Olodum after hearing that they were rehearsing there. Simon was impressed with their playing and recorded the ensemble two days later for "The Obvious Child", which became the opening track to Rhythm of the Saints. On Rhythm of the Saints, Simon decided to build many of the tracks around polyrhythmic percussion patterns. Michael Jackson recorded his 1996 hit They Don't Really Care About Us in Bahia. Spike Lee and directed the music video for this song, the music video was shot in the historic district of Pelourinho in Salvador and in a favela in Rio de Janeiro. Michael Jackson collaborated with Olodum in this video, which featured 200 members of the band playing their different types of drums to the sound of samba-reggae from Salvador. Due to this video, Olodum was exposed to 140 countries, increasing the reach of Afro-Brazilian samba-reggae.

The success of Ivete Sangalo and Claudia Leitte in the United States. Both singers sell out shows wherever they go, Ivete Sangalo sold out Madison Square Garden in 2010. In an interview before her show at MS, she stated: "When I was recognized in Brazil, I was also known, and Brazil is a gigantic place with a lot of talent. I didn't come here with the intention of being known, but what I came here to do, I came to do right". In that show, she managed to bring to the United States a "mini-version of Carnival". Claudia Leitte, on the other hand, gained international prominence when she appeared on Billboard's Social 50 for 8 weeks after collaborating on "We Are One", the 2014 World Cup theme song. Pitbull, Daddy Yankee and Jennifer Lopez. Ivete Sangalo is the only artist to have participated in all editions of the Rock in Rio Lisboa show, in addition to having participated in Rock in Rio Brasil, Spain and the United States.
