= MTV Video Music Brazil =

Music Award in Brazil (1995-2012)

MTV Video Music Brasil
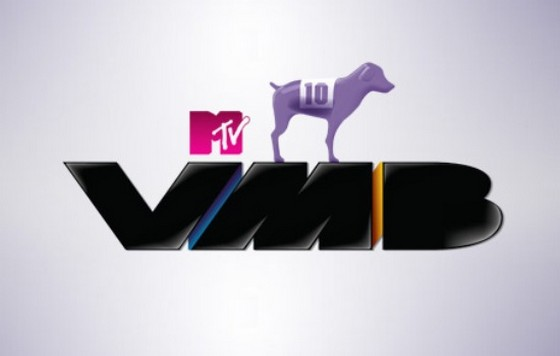
- Logo of 2010 MTV Video Music Brazil
- Awarded for: Best in music, pop culture and online culture
- Country: Brazil
- Presented by: MTV Brasil
- First award: 1995
- Final award: 2012 (18 editions)
- Website: http://vmb.mtv.uol.com.br/

The MTV Video Music Brasil awards (originally Video Music Awards Brasil and more commonly known as VMB), were MTV Brasil's annual award ceremony, established in 1995. MTV viewers picked the winners for most categories since 2001.

Unlike the MTV Video Music Awards, where Video of the Year is the top honor, the most important category at the MTV Video Music Brazil was the Viewer's Choice Award until both categories were merged in 2005. In 2007, the awards underwent a major rebranding, with several categories eliminated—most notably the specific genre divisions—and the design of the trophies changed. From that year onward, the event shifted its focus from music videos to artists, making Artist of the Year its most prestigious award, although the Video of the Year category continued to be presented.

For the first time, the former MTV did not hold the 2013 VMB, due to the high price of the prize pool and the delivery of the station's brand to Viacom. In 2014, the pay TV version of MTV Brazil considered reviving the awards, but the plans were eventually discontinued in order to priorize MTV's international awards, such as the Video Music Awards and the MTV EMA. Even so, the award was considered extinct. In 2018, MTV started to produce MTV MIAW Awards Brazil as an award focused on Brazilian pop culture, being considered in some ways a successor to the VMB.

== Venues / Hosts ==
Year	Venue	Host(s)	Web host	Date
1995	Memorial da América Latina	Marisa Orth		August 31, 1995
1996	Palácio das Convenções do Anhembi	Pedro Cardoso		August 22, 1996
1997	Palácio das Convenções do Anhembi	Pedro Cardoso		November 14, 1997
1998	Palácio das Convenções do Anhembi	Carlinhos Brown		December 2, 1998
1999	Via Funchal	Cazé Peçanha		December 4, 1999
2000	Credicard Hall	Luana Piovani		December 2, 2000
2001	Credicard Hall	Marcos Mion		November 6, 2001
2002	Credicard Hall	Fernanda Lima		August 22, 2002
2003	Palácio das Convenções do Anhembi	Fernanda Lima		September 30, 2003
2004	Palácio das Convenções do Anhembi	Selton Mello		October 5, 2004
2005	Credicard Hall	Selton Mello		September 29, 2005
2006	Credicard Hall	Cazé Peçanha; Marcos Mion; Daniela Cicarelli		September 28, 2006
2007	Credicard Hall	Daniela Cicarelli	João Gordo	September 27, 2007
2008	Credicard Hall	Marcos Mion	Marcelo Adnet	October 2, 2008
2009	Credicard Hall	Marcelo Adnet	Didi Effe	October 1, 2009
2010	Credicard Hall	Marcelo Adnet	MariMoon	September 16, 2010
2011	Quanta Studios	Marcelo Adnet	Bento Ribeiro	October 20, 2011
2012	Espaço das Américas	No main host		September 20, 2012

== Award Categories ==
- Artist of the Year (2007-2012)
- Video of the Year (1995-2012)
- Hit of the Year (2007-2012)
- MTV Bet(2007-2012)
- Best New Artist in a Video/Breakthrough Artist (1995-2012)
- Best Male Video (1995-2012)
- Best Female Video (1995-2012)
- Best International Video(2002-2012)
- Best Pop Video (1995-2006, 2009-2012)
- Best Rock Video (1995-2006, 2009-2012)
- Best Rap Video (1995-2006, 2009-2012)
- Best MPB Video (1995-2006, 2009-2012)

=== Defunct Categories ===
- Viewers' Choice (1995-2006, Replaced by Artist of the Year)
- Webstar Of The Year (2007–2011)
- Webhit of The Year (2007–2011)
- Best Alternative Rock Video (2009-2010)
- Best Hardcore Video (2009-2010)
- Best Samba Video (2009-2010)
- Best Reggae Video (2009-2010)
- Best Instrumental Video (2009-2010)
- Best Electronic Video (1995–2006, 2009-2010)
- Best Direction in a Video (1995–2006)
- Best Editing in a Video (1995–2006)
- Best Art Director in a Video (1995–2006)
- Best Cinematography in a Video (1995–2006)

== Award winners ==
=== 1995 ===
- Video Of The Year: Marisa Monte - Segue o Seco
- Best New Artist in a Video: Pato Fu - Sobre o Tempo
- Best Direction in a Video: Marisa Monte - Segue o Seco
- Best Editing in a Video: Marisa Monte - Segue o Seco
- Best Cinematography in a Video: Marisa Monte - Segue o Seco
- Best MPB Video: Marisa Monte - Segue o Seco
- Best Pop Video: Paralamas do Sucesso - Uma Brasileira
- Best Rap Video: Gabriel, O Pensador - 175 — Nada Especial
- Best Rock Video: Raimundos - Bê a Bá
- Best Demo-video: The Teahouse Band - Leaving It All behind
- Viewer's Choice: Paralamas do Sucesso - Uma Brasileira

=== 1996 ===
- Video Of The Year: Paralamas do Sucesso - Lourinha Bombril
- Best New Artist in a Video: Karnak - Comendo Uva na Chuva
- Best Video Director: Paralamas do Sucesso - Lourinha Bombril
- Best Edited Video: Paralamas do Sucesso - Lourinha Bombril
- Best Photography: Marina Lima - Beija Flor
- Best MPB Video: Nando Reis - A Fila
- Best Pop Video: Skank - Garota Nacional
- Best Rap Video: Gabriel, O Pensador - Rabo de Saia
- Best Rock Video: Barão Vermelho - Vem Quente Que Eu Estou Fervendo
- Best Demo-video: Mulheres que Dizem Sim - Eu Sou Melhor Que Você
- Viewer's Choice: Skank - Garota Nacional

=== 1997 ===
- Video Of The Year: Paralamas do Sucesso - Busca Vida
- Best New Artist in a Video: Claudinho & Buchecha - Conquista
- Best Video Director: Karnak - Alma Não Tem Cor
- Best Edited Video: Skank - É uma Partida de Futebol
- Best Photography: Daniela Mercury - Nobre Vagabundo
- Best MPB Video: Chico César - Mama África
- Best Pop Video: Skank - É uma Partida de Futebol
- Best Rap Video: Pavilhão 9 - Mandando Bronca
- Best Rock Video: Sepultura - Ratamahatta
- Best Demo-video: Comunidade NinJitsu - Detetive
- Viewer's Choice: Skank - É uma Partida de Futebol

=== 1998 ===
- Video Of The Year: Paralamas do Sucesso - Ela Disse Adeus
- Best New Artist in a Video: Charlie Brown Jr. - Proibida pra Mim
- Best Video Director: Paralamas do Sucesso - Ela Disse Adeus
- Best Art Direction: Paralamas do Sucesso - Ela Disse Adeus
- Best Edited Video: Lulu Santos - Hyperconectividade
- Best Photography: Paralamas do Sucesso - Ela Disse Adeus
- Best MPB Video: Caetano Veloso - Não Enche
- Best Pop Video: Paralamas do Sucesso - Ela Disse Adeus
- Best Rap Video: Racionais MC's - Diário de um Detento
- Best Rock Video: Raimundos - Andar na Pedra
- Best Demo-video: Paulo Francis Vai Pro Céu - Perdidos no Espaço
- Viewer's Choice: Racionais MC's - Diário de um Detento

=== 1999 ===
- Video Of The Year: Skank - Mandrake e os Cubanos
- Best New Artist in a Video: Otto - Bob
- Best Video Director: Karnak - Universo Umbigo
- Best Art Direction: Skank - Mandrake e os Cubanos
- Best Edited Video: Paralamas do Sucesso - Depois da Queda o Coice
- Best Photography: Chico Buarque - Carioca
- Best MPB Video: Chico Buarque - Carioca
- Best Pop Video: Arnaldo Antunes - Música para Ouvir / Skank - Mandrake e os Cubanos
- Best Rap Video: Câmbio Negro - Esse É o Meu País
- Best Rock Video: Raimundos - Mulher de Fases
- Best Axé Video: Banda Eva - Carro Velho
- Best Pagode Video: Zeca Pagodinho - Vai Vadiar
- Best Demo-video: Caboclada - E Aí, Beleza?
- Viewer's Choice: Raimundos - Mulher de Fases

=== 2000 ===
- Video Of The Year: O Rappa - A Minha Alma (A Paz Que Eu Não Quero)
- Best New Artist in a Video: Los Hermanos - Anna Júlia
- Best Video Director: O Rappa - A Minha Alma (A Paz Que Eu Não Quero)
- Best Art Direction: Pato Fu - Made in Japan
- Best Edited Video: O Rappa - A Minha Alma (A Paz Que Eu Não Quero)
- Best Photography: O Rappa - A Minha Alma (A Paz Que Eu Não Quero)
- Best Animation: Andrea Marquee - O Que Aconteceu com Nosso Amor
- Best MPB Video: Marisa Monte - Amor I Love You
- Best Pop Video: Skank - Três Lados
- Best Rap Video: Xis - Us Mano e as Mina
- Best Rock Video: O Rappa - A Minha Alma (A Paz Que Eu Não Quero)
- Best Axé Video: Daniela Mercury - Ilê Pérola Negra
- Best Pagode Video: Os Travessos - Meu Querubim
- Best Demo-video: Radar Tantã - Na Dúvida Atire
- Best Electronic Video: Golden Shower - Video Computer System
- Viewer's Choice: O Rappa - A Minha Alma (A Paz Que Eu Não Quero)
- Best Website: Marisa Monte - https://www.marisamonte.com.br

=== 2001 ===
- Video Of The Year: O Rappa - O Que Sobrou do Céu
- Best New Artist in a Video: Bidê ou Balde - Melissa
- Best Video Director: O Rappa - O Que Sobrou do Céu
- Best Art Direction: AD - AD#27 (Get Down)
- Best Edited Video: Gabriel, O Pensador - Até Quando?
- Best Photography: O Rappa - O Que Sobrou do Céu
- Best MPB Video: Marisa Monte - O Que Me Importa
- Best Pop Video: Pato Fu - Eu
- Best Rap Video: MV Bill - Soldado do Morro
- Best Rock Video: Charlie Brown Jr. - Rubão, o Dono do Mundo
- Best Demo-video: Feijão com Arroz - Joe Camarada
- Best Electronic Video: DJ Marky - Tudo
- Viewer's Choice: Charlie Brown Jr. - Rubão, o Dono do Mundo
- Best Website: Raimundos - https://web.archive.org/web/20170920053534/http://raimundos.org/
- Worse Music Video of World: Supla - Green Hair

=== 2002 ===
- Best Rock Video: Titãs - Epitáfio
- Best Electronic Video: 2Freakz - Station
- Best International Video: Linkin Park - In The End
- Best Demo-video: Ratos de Porão - Agressão, Repressão
- Best MPB Video: Zeca Pagodinho - Deixa a Vida me Levar
- Best Photography: Caetano Veloso and Jorge Mautner - Todo Errado
- Best Art Director: O Rappa - Instinto Coletivo
- Best Edited: Gabriel, O Pensador - Tem Alguém Aí
- Best Pop Video: Frejat - Segredos
- Best Video Director: O Rappa - Instinto Coletivo
- Best Website: Comunidade Ninjitsu - https://web.archive.org/web/20170924035540/http://comunidadeninjitsu.com.br/
- Best Rap Video: Xis - Chapa o Coco
- Best New Artist in a Video: CPM 22 - Tarde de Outubro
- Video Of The Year: Titãs - Epitáfio
- Viewer's Choice: Titãs - Epitáfio

=== 2003 ===
- Best Rock Video: Charlie Brown Jr. - Só por uma Noite
- Best Electronic Video: Fernanda Porto and DJ Patife - Sambassim (DJ Patife)
- Best International Video: Linkin Park - Somewhere I Belong
- Best Independent Video: Ratos de Porão - Próximo Alvo
- Best MPB Video: Gilberto Gil - Three Little Birds
- Best Photography: Sepultura - Bullet The Blue Sky
- Best Art Director: Gilberto Gil - Three Little Birds
- Best Edited Video: Pato Fu - Não Mais
- Best Pop Video: Skank - Dois Rios
- Best Video Director: Marcelo D2 - Qual É?
- Best Website: Nando Reis - http://www.nandoreis.com.br
- Best Rap Video: Marcelo D2 - Qual É?
- Best New Artist in a Video: Detonautas Roque Clube - Quando o Sol Se For
- Video Of The Year: Marcelo D2 - Qual É?
- Viewer's Choice: Charlie Brown Jr. - Papo Reto (Prazer É Sexo, o Resto É Negócio)

=== 2004 ===
- Best Rock Video: Pitty - Equalize
- Best Electronic Video: Marcelinho da Lua and Seu Jorge - Cotidiano
- Best International Video: Linkin Park - Numb
- Best Independent Video: Ludov - Princesa
- Best MPB Video: Seu Jorge - Tive Razão
- Best Photography: Marcelo D2 - Loadeando
- Best Art Director: Elza Soares - Rio de Janeiro
- Best Edited Video: O Rappa - O Salto
- Best Pop Video: Skank - Vou Deixar
- Best Video Director: O Rappa - O Salto
- Best Website: Detonautas - http://www.detonautas.com.br
- Best Rap Video: Marcelo D2 - Loadeando
- Best New Artist in a Video: Dead Fish - Zero e Um
- Video Of The Year: Marcelo D2 - Loadeando
- Viewer's Choice: Pitty - Admirável Chip Novo

=== 2005 ===
- Best Rock Video: CPM 22 - Um Minuto para o Fim do Mundo
- Best Electronic Video: Marcelinho da Lua - Refazenda
- Best International Video: System of a Down - B.Y.O.B.
- Best Independent Video: Autoramas - Você Sabe
- Best MPB Video: Marcelo D2 - A Maldição do Samba
- Best Photography: Gabriel, O Pensador - Palavras Repetidas
- Best Art Director: Pato Fu - Anormal
- Best Edited Video: Autoramas - Você Sabe
- Best Pop Video: Gabriel, O Pensador - Palavras Repetidas
- Best Video Director: Autoramas - Você Sabe
- Best Website: Moptop - https://web.archive.org/web/20100912144715/http://www.moptop.com.br/
- Best Rap Video: Helião and Negra Li - Exército do Rap
- Best New Artist in a Video: Leela - Te Procuro
- Best Live Performance in a Video: Ira! and Pitty - Eu Quero Sempre Mais
- Video of the Year - Viewer's Choice: CPM 22 - Um Minuto para o Fim do Mundo
- Idol MTV: Pitty
- Dream band: Pitty, vocals; Edgard Scandurra (Ira!), guitar; Champignon (Revolucionnários), bass; Japinha (CPM 22), drums.

=== 2006 ===
- Best Rock Video: Pitty - Déjà-Vu
- Best Rap Video: Marcelo D2 - Gueto
- Best MPB Video: Los Hermanos - Morena
- Best Direction in a Video: Sepultura - Convicted In Life
- Best New Artist in a Video: Hateen - Quem Já Perdeu Um Sonho Aqui?
- Vc Fez ("U Made It", viewer-made video): Marcelo Veron, with a version of "1997", song of the band Hateen.
- Best Live Performance in a Video: CPM 22 - Inevitável
- Best Independent Video: Banzé - Doce Ilusão
- Dream Band: Pitty, vocals; Fabrizio Martinelli (Hateen), guitar; Champignon (Revolucionnários), bass; Japinha (CPM 22), drums.
- Best Pop Video: Jota Quest - O Sol
- Best Editing in a Video: Sepultura - Convicted In Life
- Best Art Direction in a Video: Nação Zumbi - Hoje, Amanhã e Depois
- Best Cinematography in a Video: Lulu Santos - Vale de Lágrimas
- Best International Video: The Black Eyed Peas - Pump It
- Best Fansite: Pitty - https://web.archive.org/web/20110715085325/http://www.pittybr.com/
- Video of the Year - Viewer's Choice: Pitty - Memórias

=== 2007 ===
- Breakthrough Artist: Fresno
- MTV Bet ("Aposta MTV"): Strike
- Best Live Performance: Cachorro Grande
- Web Hit: "Vai Tomar no C*"
- Video You Made ("Clipe que Você Fez", viewer-made video): Gabriel Alves, with a version of "Na Sua Estante", by Pitty.
- Dream Band: Pitty, vocals; Fabrizio Martinelli (Hateen), guitar; Champignon (Revolucionnários), bass; Japinha (CPM 22), drums.
- International Artist: Red Hot Chili Peppers
- Hit of the Year: NX Zero - Razões e Emoções
- Video of the Year: Pitty - Na Sua Estante
- Artist of the Year: NX Zero

=== 2008 ===
- Breakthrough Artist: Strike
- MTV Bet ("Aposta MTV"): Garotas Suecas
- Best Live Performance: Pitty
- Web Hit: Dança do Quadrado
- Video You Made ("Clipe que Você Fez", viewer-made video): Fábio Viana with a version of "Uma Música", by Fresno
- Dream Band: Marcelo D2, vocals; Chimbinha (Banda Calypso), guitar; Bi Ribeiro (Os Paralamas do Sucesso), bass; João Barone (Os Paralamas do Sucesso), drums
- International Artist: Paramore
- Hit of the Year: NX Zero - Pela Última Vez
- Video of the Year: NX Zero - Pela Última Vez
- Artist of the Year: NX Zero

=== 2009 ===
- Artist of the Year: Fresno
- Hit of the Year: NX Zero – "Cartas pra você"
- Video of the Year: Skank – "Sutilmente"
- International Artist: Britney Spears
- Best Live Performance: Os Paralamas do Sucesso
- Breakthrough Artist: Cine
- MTV Bet: Vivendo do Ócio
- Dream Band:
  - Vocals: Lucas Silveira (Fresno);
  - Guitar: Martin Mendonça (Pitty);
  - Bass: Rodrigo Tavares (Fresno);
  - Drums: Duda Machado (Pitty)
- Pop: Fresno
- Rock: Forfun
- Alternative Rock: Pública
- Hardcore: Dead Fish
- MPB: Fernanda Takai
- Samba: Zeca Pagodinho
- Reggae: Chimarruts
- Rap: MV Bill
- Instrumental: Pata de Elefante
- Electronica: N.A.S.A.
- Best Musical Documentary or Movie: Titãs - A Vida Até Parece Uma Festa (directed by Branco Mello and Oscar Rodrigues Alves)
- Web Hit of the Year: Os Seminovos – "Escolha já seu nerd"
- Blog of the Year: Jovem Nerd
- Twitter of the Year: Marcos Mion – @mionzera
- Game of the Year: The Sims 3

=== 2010 ===
- Artist of the Year: Restart
- Hit of the Year: Restart – "Levo Comigo"
- Video of the Year: Restart - "Recomeçar"
- International Artist: Justin Bieber
- Best Live Performance: NX Zero
- Breakthrough Artist: Restart
- MTV Bet: Thiago Pethit
- International Bet: School of Seven Bells
- Rock: Pitty
- Pop: Restart
- MPB: Diogo Nogueira
- Rap: MV Bill
- Electronica: Boss in Drama
- Web Hit of the Year: Justin Biba - "Paródia Justin Bieber|Baby"
- Web Star: Felipe Neto
- Game of the Year: Super Mario Galaxy 2

=== 2011 ===
==== MTV "Academy" ====
- Artist of the Year: Emicida
- Video of the Year: Emicida - "Então Toma"
- Song of the Year: Criolo - "Não Existe Amor em SP"
- Breakthrough Artist: Criolo
- MTV Bet: Tono
- Album of the Year: Criolo - "Nó na Orelha"
- Album Art of the Year: Tiê - "A Coruja e o Coração"

==== Popular voting ====
- Hit of the Year: CW7 - "Me Acorde Pra Vida"
- International Artist: Lady Gaga
- Web Hit of the Year: Sou Foda
- Web Video of the Year: Banda Uó - "Shake de Amor"

=== 2012 ===
- Artist of the year - Gaby Amarantos
- Song of the year - Wado - "Com a ponta dos dedos" (Wado/Glauber Xavier), Emicida - "Dedo na ferida" (Emicida)
- Breakthrough Artist - Projota
- Album of the year - BNegão & Seletores de Frequência - "Sintoniza lá"
- Best Male - Criolo
- Best Female - Gaby Amarantos
- Best Group - Vanguart
- Best Cover - Gaby Amarantos: "Treme" (art: Greenvision/Gotazkaen)
- International Artist - One Direction
- Bet - O Terno
- Hit of the year - Restart - "Menina Estranha"
- Video of the year - Racionais MC's - "Mil faces de um homem leal" (Marighella) (dir. Daniel Grinspum)

== See also ==
- MTV Brasil
- MTV Video Music Awards
- MTV MIAW Awards Brazil
