= 2001 MTV Video Music Brazil =

Award ceremony

- Date: 16 August 2001
- Location: Credicard Hall, São Paulo, São Paulo
- Country: Brazil
- Hosted by: Marcos Mion
- Most awards: O Rappa (3)
- Most nominations: Charlie Brown Jr. Sandy & Junior (6 each)

Television/radio coverage
- Network: MTV Brasil

The 2001 MTV Video Music Brazil was held on 16 August 2001, at the Credicard Hall in São Paulo, honoring the best Brazilian music videos. The ceremony was hosted by Marcos Mion.

== Winners and nominees ==
Winners are listed first and highlighted in bold.

Video of the Year	Viewer's Choice
**O Rappa – "O Que Sobrou do Céu"**; AD – "AD#27 (Get Down)"; Charlie Brown Jr. – "Rubão, o Dono do Mundo"; Gabriel, o Pensador – "Até Quando?"; Sandy & Junior – "Enrosca"	**Charlie Brown Jr. – "Rubão, o Dono do Mundo"**; Adriana Calcanhotto – "Devolva-Me"; Ana Carolina – "Quem de Nós Dois"; Catedral – "Eu Amo Mais Você"; Cogumelo Plutão – "Esperando na Janela"; Falamansa – "Rindo à Toa/Xote dos Milagres"; Jay Vaquer – "A Miragem"; Jota Quest – "O Que Eu Também Não Entendo"; KLB – "Ela Não Está Aqui"; Mary's Band – "Happy Birthday"; Maurício Manieri – "Primavera"; O Rappa – "O Que Sobrou do Céu"; Os Paralamas do Sucesso – "Aonde Quer Que Eu Vá"; Patrícia Coelho – "O Meu Sangue Ferve por Você"; Rumbora – "O Mapa da Mina"; Sandy & Junior – "A Lenda"; Skank – "Balada do Amor Inabalável"; Tihuana – "Que Vês?"; Twister – "40 Graus"; Wanessa Camargo – "O Amor Não Deixa"
Best New Artist	Best Pop Video
**Bidê ou Balde – "Melissa"**; AfroReggae – "Capa de Revista"; Falamansa – "Rindo à Toa/Xote dos Milagres"; KLB – "Ela Não Está Aqui"; O Surto – "A Cera"	**Pato Fu – "Eu"**; Gabriel, o Pensador – "Até Quando?"; Rita Lee – "Erva Venenosa"; Sandy & Junior – "Enrosca"; Skank – "Ela Desapareceu"
Best MPB Video	Best Rock Video
**Marisa Monte – "O Que Me Importa"**; Adriana Calcanhotto – "Devolva-me"; Ivete Sangalo – "A Lua Q Eu T Dei"; Max de Castro – "Onda Diferente"; Moreno+2 – "Arrivederci"	**Charlie Brown Jr. – "Rubão, o Dono do Mundo"**; Herbert Vianna and Cássia Eller – "Mr. Scarecrow"; Pavilhão 9 – "Trilha do Futuro"; O Rappa – "O Que Sobrou do Céu"; Rumbora – "O Mapa da Mina"
Best Rap Video	Best Electronic Video
**MV Bill – "Soldado do Morro"**; Criminal D – "Carro Cinza"; Rappin' Hood – "Sou Negrão"; Somos Nós a Justiça – "Viajando na Balada"; Xis – "Bem Pior"	**DJ Marky – "Tudo"**; AD – "AD#27 (Get Down)"; BPM – "Autumn Leaves"; Drumagick – "Funquiada"; Golden Shower – "Total Control"
Best Demo Video	Best Artist Website
**Feijão com Arroz – "Joe Camarada"**; Diesel – "4D"; Los Pirata – "Nada"; Radar Tantã – "Rol"; The Dead Billies – "I Can’t Help Myself from Getting It On"	**Raimundos (www.raimundos.org)**; Bidê ou Balde (www.bideoubalde.com.br); Ed Motta (www.edmotta.com); Karnak (www.karnak.com.br); Max de Castro (www.maxdecastro.com.br)
Best Direction in a Video	Best Art Direction in a Video
**O Rappa – "O Que Sobrou do Céu" (Directors: Kátia Lund and André Horta)**; AD – "AD#27 (Get Down)" (Director: Jarbas Agnelli); Charlie Brown Jr. – "Rubão, o Dono do Mundo" (Directors: Chico Abreia, Caio Abreia and Manitou Felipe); Gabriel, o Pensador – "Até Quando?" (Directors: Oscar Rodrigues Alves and Nando Cohen); Sandy & Junior – "Enrosca" (Director: Hugo Prata)	**AD – "AD#27 (Get Down)" (Art Director: Jarbas Agnelli)**; Mundo Livre S/A – "Melô das Musas" (Art Director: Christiano Metri); Pato Fu – "Eu" (Art Director: Beto Grimaldi); Rita Lee – "Erva Venenosa" (Art Director: Kiti Duarte); Sandy & Junior – "Enrosca" (Art Directors: Beto Grimaldi and Marcelo Presotto)
Best Editing in a Video	Best Photography in a Video
**Gabriel, o Pensador – "Até Quando?" (Editors: Oscar Rodrigues Alves, Rogério Ferreira Alves and Daniel Rezende)**; Charlie Brown Jr. – "Rubão, o Dono do Mundo" (Editor: Marcelo Moraes); Cidade Negra – "A Flecha e o Vulcão" (Editor: Daniel Rezende); Sandy & Junior – "Enrosca" (Editor: Daniel Rezende); Skank – "Ela Desapareceu" (Editor: Ana Paula Catarino)	**O Rappa – "O Que Sobrou do Céu" (Director of Photography: André Horta)**; Charlie Brown Jr. and Negra Li – "Não é Sério" (Director of Photography: Jacques Cheuiche); Herbert Vianna and Cássia Eller – "Mr. Scarecrow" (Director of Photography: Fábio Sagattio); Os Paralamas do Sucesso – "Aonde Quer Que Eu Vá" (Director of Photography: Ricardo Della Rosa); Zélia Duncan – "Me Revelar" (Director of Photography: Flávio Zangrandi)
