= 1997 MTV Video Music Brazil =

Award ceremony

- Date: 14 August 1997
- Location: Anhembi Convention Center, São Paulo, São Paulo
- Country: Brazil
- Hosted by: Pedro Cardoso
- Most awards: Skank (3)

Television/radio coverage
- Network: MTV Brasil

The 1997 MTV Video Music Brazil was held on 14 August 1997, at the Anhembi Convention Center in São Paulo, honoring the best Brazilian music videos from June 1996, to June 1997. The ceremony was hosted by actor Pedro Cardoso for the second consecutive time.

== Winners and nominees ==
Winners are listed first and highlighted in bold.

Video of the Year	Viewer's Choice
**Os Paralamas do Sucesso – "Busca Vida"**; Carlinhos Brown – "A Namorada"; Karnak – "Alma Não Tem Cor"; Skank – "É uma Partida de Futebol"; Zélia Duncan – "Enquanto Durmo"	**Skank – "É uma Partida de Futebol"**; Angra – "Make Believe"; Baba Cósmica – "Uma Pedra no Meu Caminho"; Barão Vermelho – "Amor Meu Grande Amor"; Carlinhos Brown – "A Namorada"; Camisa de Vênus – "O Ponteiro Tá Subindo"; Cidade Negra – "Firmamento"; Fernanda Abreu – "Kátia Flávia, a Godiva do Irajá"; Kid Abelha – "Te Amo pra Sempre"; Lagoa – "Revista de Mulher Pelada"; Lulu Santos – "Aviso aos Navegantes"; Maria do Relento – "Conhece o Mário"; Nenhum de Nós – "Vou Deixar Que Você Se Vá"; Os Ostras – "Uma, Duas ou Três (Punheta)"; Os Paralamas do Sucesso – "La Bella Luna"; Pato Fu – "Água"; Planet Hemp – "Dezdasseis/Dig Dig Dig (Hempa)"; Raimundos – "Puteiro em João Pessoa"; Sepultura – "Ratamahatta"; Virgulóides – "Bagulho no Bumba"
Best New Artist	Best Pop Video
**Claudinho & Buchecha – "Conquista"**; Catapulta – "Puêra"; Os Ostras – "Cai na Água José"; Tantra – "Tropicália"; Virgulóides – "Bagulho no Bumba"	**Skank – "É uma Partida de Futebol"**; Carlinhos Brown – "A Namorada"; Daniela Mercury – "Nobre Vagabundo"; Karnak – "Alma Não Tem Cor"; Os Paralamas do Sucesso – "La Bella Luna"
Best MPB Video	Best Rock Video
**Chico César – "Mama África"**; Djavan – "Nem um Dia"; Marina Lima – "Para um Amor no Recife"; Timbalada – "Água Mineral"; Zélia Duncan – "Enquanto Durmo"	**Sepultura – "Ratamahatta"**; Barão Vermelho – "Amor Meu Grande Amor"; Planet Hemp – "Queimando Tudo"; Raimundos – "Puteiro em João Pessoa II"; Virna Lisi – "Vou Te Mostrar"
Best Rap Video	Best Demo Video
**Pavilhão 9 – "Mandando Bronca"**; Câmbio Negro – "Sub-Raça"; De Menos Crime – "Policiais"; GOG – "Periferia Segue Sangrando"; Visão de Rua – "Irmã de Cela"	**Comunidade Nin-Jitsu – "Detetive"**; The Funk Fuckers – "Inthahouse"; KA2 – "Menino"; Lara Hanouska – "10 Anos Como Sempre"; Natalia Barros – "Faróis"
Best Direction in a Video	Best Editing in a Video
**Karnak – "Alma Não Tem Cor" (Director: Hugo Prata)**; Carlinhos Brown – "A Namorada" (Director: José Henrique Fonseca); Os Paralamas do Sucesso – "Busca Vida" (Directors: Andrew Waddington, Breno Silveira and Fábio Soares); Skank – "É uma Partida de Futebol" (Director: Roberto Berliner); Zélia Duncan – "Enquanto Durmo" (Directors: Andrew Waddington, Breno Silveira and Cláudio Torres)	**Skank – "É uma Partida de Futebol" (Editor: Leonardo Domingues)**; Fernanda Abreu – "Kátia Flávia, a Godiva do Irajá" (Editors: Felipe Lacerda and Luiz Stein); Lulu Santos – "Aviso aos Navegantes" (Editors: Leonardo Domingues, Raul Mourão, Roberto Berliner and Jorge Alanis); Os Paralamas do Sucesso – "Busca Vida" (Editors: Sérgio Mekler and Joana Ventura); Zélia Duncan – "Enquanto Durmo" (Editor: Deoclécio Teixeira (Deo))
Best Cinematography in a Video
**Daniela Mercury – "Nobre Vagabundo" (Director of Photography: Márcia Ramalho)**; Carlinhos Brown – "A Namorada" (Director of Photography: Breno Silveira); Djavan – "Nem um Dia" (Director of Photography: Breno Silveira); Paulinho Moska – "A Seta and o Alvo" (Director of Photography: Breno Silveira); Zélia Duncan – "Enquanto Durmo" (Director of Photography: Breno Silveira)
