= 1999 MTV Video Music Brazil =

Award ceremony

- Date: 19 August 1999
- Location: Via Funchal, São Paulo, São Paulo
- Country: Brazil
- Hosted by: Cazé Peçanha
- Most awards: Skank (3)

Television/radio coverage
- Network: MTV Brasil

The 1999 MTV Video Music Brazil was held on 19 August 1999, at the Via Funchal in São Paulo, honoring the best Brazilian music videos from June 1998 to June 1999. The ceremony was hosted by Cazé Peçanha.

== Winners and nominees ==
Winners are listed first and highlighted in bold.

Video of the Year	Viewer's Choice
**Skank – "Mandrake e os Cubanos"**; Caetano Veloso – "Sozinho"; Capital Inicial – "O Mundo"; Cidade Negra – "Já Foi"; Otto – "Bob"	**Raimundos – "Mulher de Fases"**; Banda Eva – "De Ladinho"; Barão Vermelho – "Por Você"; Caetano Veloso – "Sozinho"; Capital Inicial – "O Mundo"; Charlie Brown Jr. – "Zóio de Lula"; Cidade Negra – "Já Foi"; Claudinho & Buchecha – "Só Love"; Engenheiros do Hawaii – "Eu Que Não Amo Você"; Jota Quest – "Sempre Assim"; Kid Abelha – "Eu Só Penso em Você"; Leonardo – "120... 150... 200 Km, por Hora"; Nativus – "Liberdade pra Dentro da Cabeça"; Os Paralamas do Sucesso – "Depois da Queda o Coice"; Pato Fu – "Canção pra Você Viver Mais"; Pepê & Neném – "Mania de Você"; Sandy & Junior – "No Fundo do Coração"; Skank – "Mandrake e os Cubanos"; Só Pra Contrariar – "Sai da Minha Aba (Bicão)"; Vinny – "Shake Boom"
Best New Artist	Best Pop Video
**Otto – "Bob"**; Maurício Manieri – "Minha Menina"; Nativus – "Liberdade pra Dentro da Cabeça"; Pepê & Neném – "Mania de Você"; Vinny – "Shake Boom"	**Arnaldo Antunes – "Música para Ouvir"**; **Skank – "Mandrake e os Cubanos"**; Cidade Negra – "Já Foi"; Otto – "Bob"; Os Paralamas do Sucesso – "Depois da Queda o Coice"
Best MPB Video	Best Rock Video
**Chico Buarque – "Carioca"**; Caetano Veloso – "Sozinho"; Leonardo – "120... 150... 200 Km, por Hora"; Marina Lima – "Pierrot"; Zélia Duncan – "Verbos Sujeitos"	**Raimundos – "Mulher de Fases"**; Barão Vermelho – "Por Você"; Capital Inicial – "O Mundo"; Charlie Brown Jr. – "Zóio de Lula"; Rumbora – "Chapirous"
Best Rap Video	Best Axé Video
**Câmbio Negro – "Esse é o Meu País"**; Detentos do Rap – "Casa Cheia"; De Menos Crime – "Fogo na Bomba"; MV Bill – "Traficando Informação"; Pavilhão 9 – "Vai Explodir"	**Banda Eva – "Carro Velho"**; Banda Crocodilo – "Ginga"; Banda Eva – "De Ladinho"; Cheiro de Amor – "Ficar com Você"; É o Tchan! – "É o Tchan no Havaí"
Best Pagode Video	Best Demo Video
**Zeca Pagodinho – "Vai Vadiar"**; Exaltasamba – "Me Apaixonei Pela Pessoa Errada"; Karametade – "Nunca Vou Deixar Você"; Negritude Júnior – "Porcelana"; Só Pra Contrariar – "Sai da Minha Aba (Bicão)"	**Caboclada – "E Aí Beleza?"**; AD – "AD #8"; Dona Margarida Pereira e os Fulanos – "Batuque"; Holly Tree – "Hey! Stop It"; Radar Tantã – "Todos os Dias"
Best Direction in a Video	Best Art Direction in a Video
**Karnak – "Universo Umbigo" (Directors: André Abujamra and Guilherme Ramalho)**; Capital Inicial – "O Mundo" (Directors: Rodrigo Lewkowicz and Carmine Bagnato); MV Bill – "Traficando Informação" (Director: Kátia Lund); Otto – "Bob" (Director: Lírio Ferreira); Skank – "Mandrake e os Cubanos" (Directors: Roberto Berliner and Raul Mourão)	**Skank – "Mandrake e os Cubanos" (Art Directors: Raul Mourão and André Weller)**; Capital Inicial – "O Mundo" (Art Director: Beto Grimaldi); Leonardo – "120... 150... 200 Km, por Hora" (Art Director: Gringo Cardia); Maurício Manieri – "Minha Menina" (Art Director: Marcelo Reginato); Pato Fu – "Eu Sei" (Art Director: Beto Grimaldi)
Best Editing in a Video	Best Cinematography in a Video
**Os Paralamas do Sucesso – "Depois da Queda o Coice" (Editor: Sérgio Mekler)**; Câmbio Negro – "Círculo Vicioso" (Editors: Daniel Rezende and Vitor Mafra); Cidade Negra – "Já Foi" (Editors: Oscar Rodrigues Alves and Rogério Alves); Pedro Luís e a Parede – "Caio no Suíngue" (Editor: Leonardo Domingues); Ultramen – "Vou a Mais de Cem" (Editor: Sérgio Mekler)	**Chico Buarque – "Carioca" (Director of Photography: André Horta)**; Banda Eva – "De Ladinho" (Director of Photography: André Horta); Barão Vermelho – "Por Você" (Director of Photography: Adriano Goldman); Câmbio Negro – "Esse é o Meu País" (Director of Photography: Adriano Goldman); Cidade Negra – "Já Foi" (Director of Photography: Adriano Goldman)
