= 1995 MTV Video Music Brazil =

- Date: 31 August 1995
- Location: Latin America Memorial, São Paulo, São Paulo
- Country: Brazil
- Hosted by: Marisa Orth
- Most awards: Marisa Monte (5)

Television/radio coverage
- Network: MTV Brasil

The 1995 MTV Video Music Brazil was held on 31 August 1995, at the Latin America Memorial in São Paulo, honoring the best Brazilian music videos from June 1994, to May 1995. The inaugural ceremony was hosted by actress Marisa Orth.

== Winners and nominees ==
Winners are listed first and highlighted in bold.

Video of the Year	Best New Artist
**Marisa Monte – "Segue o Seco"**; Nando Reis – "A Fila"; Os Paralamas do Sucesso – "Uma Brasileira"; Raimundos – "Bê a Bá"; Skank – "Te Ver"	**Pato Fu – "Sobre o Tempo"**; Chico Science & Nação Zumbi – "Da Lama ao Caos"; Jorge Cabeleira – "Carolina"; Mundo Livre S/A – "Livre Iniciativa"; Planet Hemp – "Legalize Já"
Best Pop Video	Best MPB Video
**Os Paralamas do Sucesso – "Uma Brasileira"**; Cássia Eller – "Malandragem"; Cidade Negra – "A Sombra da Maldade"; Lulu Santos – "Tudo Igual"; Skank – "É Proibido Fumar"	**Marisa Monte – "Segue o Seco"**; Djavan – "Sem Saber"; Nando Reis – "A Fila"; Ney Matogrosso – "Amendoim Torradinho"; Zélia Duncan – "Tempestade"
Best Rock Video	Best Rap Video
**Raimundos – "Bê a Bá"**; Barão Vermelho – "Daqui Por Diante"; Jorge Cabeleira – "Carolina"; Planet Hemp – "Legalize Já"; Virna Lisi – "Eu Quero Essa Mulher Assim Mesmo"	**Gabriel, o Pensador – "175 Nada Especial"**; Athalyba e a Firma – "Política"; Código 13 – "Foge Garoto"; DMN – "A Forma Originamental"; Sistema Negro – "Cada Um por Si"
Best Demo Video	Best Direction in a Video
**The Teahouse Band – "Leaving It All Behind"**; Acústicos & Valvulados – "Dynamite"; Cavalo do Cão – "Sexo Turismo"; Diorama – "Postcard"; Gueto – "Ilustre Desconhecido"	**Marisa Monte – "Segue o Seco"**; Arnaldo Antunes – "Alegria"; Nando Reis – "A Fila"; Os Paralamas do Sucesso – "Uma Brasileira"; Skank – "É Proibido Fumar"
Best Editing in a Video	Best Cinematography in a Video
**Marisa Monte – "Segue o Seco"**; Barão Vermelho – "Daqui por Diante"; Cidade Negra – "A Sombra da Maldade"; Nando Reis – "A Fila"; Skank – "Te Ver"	**Marisa Monte – "Segue o Seco"**; Nando Reis – "A Fila"; Ney Matogrosso – "Amendoim Torradinho"; Skank – "Te Ver"; Zélia Duncan – "Tempestade"
Viewer's Choice	Sim Award
**Os Paralamas do Sucesso – "Uma Brasileira"**; Barão Vermelho – "Daqui por Diante"; Marisa Monte – "Segue o Seco"; Nando Reis – "A Fila"; Skank – "Te Ver"; Viper – "Coma Rage"	**Skank**
