= 2000 MTV Video Music Brazil =

Award ceremony

- Date: 10 August 2000
- Location: Credicard Hall, São Paulo, São Paulo
- Country: Brazil
- Hosted by: Luana Piovani
- Most awards: O Rappa (6)
- Most nominations: O Rappa (7)

Television/radio coverage
- Network: MTV Brasil

The 2000 MTV Video Music Brazil was held on 10 August 2000, at the Credicard Hall in São Paulo, honoring the best Brazilian music videos. The ceremony was hosted by actress Luana Piovani.

== Winners and nominees ==
Winners are listed first and highlighted in bold.

Video of the Year	Viewer's Choice
**O Rappa – "Minha Alma (A Paz Que Eu Não Quero)"**; Ira! – "Bebendo Vinho"; Lenine – "Paciência"; Marisa Monte – "Amor I Love You"; Pato Fu – "Made in Japan"	**O Rappa – "A Minha Alma (A Paz Que Eu Não Quero)"**; Capital Inicial – "Eu Vou Estar"; Charlie Brown Jr. – "Confisco"; Daniela Mercury – "Ilê Pérola Negra"; Engenheiros do Hawaii – "Negro Amor"; Gabriel, o Pensador and Lulu Santos – "Astronauta"; Los Hermanos – "Anna Júlia"; Los Hermanos – "Primavera"; Maurício Manieri – "Bem Querer"; Natiruts – "O Carcará e a Rosa"; O Rappa – "Me Deixa"; Pato Fu – "Depois"; Penélope – "Holiday"; Raimundos – "A Mais Pedida"; Raimundos – "Me Lambe"; Raimundos – "Pompem"; Rumbora – "Skaô"; Sandy & Junior – "Imortal"; Titãs – "Aluga-se"; Titãs – "Pelados em Santos"
Best New Artist	Best Pop Video
**Los Hermanos – "Anna Júlia"**; Lucas Santtana – "De Coletivo ou de Metrô"; Max de Castro – "Samba Raro"; Negril – "Pense Bem"; Penélope – "Namorinho de Portão"	**Skank – "Três Lados"**; Gabriel, o Pensador e Lulu Santos – "Astronauta"; Maurício Manieri – "Pensando em Você (Shining Star)"; Pato Fu – "Made in Japan"; Sandy & Junior – "Imortal"
Best MPB Video	Best Rock Video
**Marisa Monte – "Amor I Love You"**; Chico Buarque – "O Meu Amor"; Daniela Mercury – "Santa Helena"; Djavan – "Acelerou"; Lenine – "Paciência"	**O Rappa – "Minha Alma (A Paz Que Eu Não Quero)"**; Charlie Brown Jr. – "Não Deixe o Mar Te Engolir"; Ira! – "Bebendo Vinho"; Jota Quest – "Oxigênio"; Raimundos – "A Mais Pedida"
Best Rap Video	Best Axé Video
**Xis – "Us Mano e as Mina"**; 509-E – "Só os Fortes"; DMN – "H. Aço"; MV Bill – "A Noite"; Jigaboo (featuring Charlie Brown Jr.) - "Vai Pirar"	**Daniela Mercury – "Ilê Pérola Negra"**; As Meninas – "Xibom Bombom"; Ivete Sangalo – "Canibal"; Ivete Sangalo – "Tá Tudo Bem"; Terra Samba – "No Ponto"
Best Pagode Video	Best Electronic Video
**Os Travessos – "Meu Querubim"**; Dudu Nobre – "Feliz da Vida"; Molejo – "Sweet Banana"; Os Morenos – "Olho Grande"; Raça Negra – "Sem Você Aqui Comigo"	**Golden Shower – "Video Computed System"**; Flu – "Suellen"; M4J – "Macumba"; Ram Science – "Drum Rhodes"; Xerxes – "TV Aquarium"
Best Demo Video	Best Artist Website
**Radar Tantã – "Na Dúvida Atire"**; Brasov – "O Homem Objeto"; CPM 22 – "Anteontem"; Tchubandionis – "Valvulado"; Tom Bloch – "Nossa Senhora"	**Marisa Monte (www.marisamonte.com.br)**; Ed Motta (www.edmotta.com.br); Gilberto Gil (www.gilbertogil.com.br); Max de Castro (www.maxdecastro.com.br); Os Paralamas do Sucesso (www.osparalamas.com.br)
Best Direction in a Video	Best Art Direction in a Video
**O Rappa – "Minha Alma (A Paz Que Eu Não Quero)" (Directors: Kátia Lund, Breno Silveira and Paulo Lins)**; Ira! – "Bebendo Vinho" (Directors: Carmine Bagnato, Lula Maluf and Beto Grimaldi); Lenine – "Paciência" (Director: Hugo Prata); Marisa Monte – "Amor I Love You" (Directors: Breno Silveira and Lula Buarque de Hollanda); Pato Fu – "Made in Japan" (Director: Jarbas Agnelli)	**Pato Fu – "Made in Japan" (Art Director: Jarbas Agnelli)**; Carlinhos Brown – "Busy Man"; Lenine – "Paciência" (Art Director: Beto Grimaldi); Marisa Monte – "Amor I Love You"; Penélope – "Namorinho de Portão"
Best Editing in a Video	Best Cinematography in a Video
**O Rappa – "Minha Alma (A Paz Que Eu Não Quero)" (Editor: Karen Harley)**; Cássia Eller – "O Segundo Sol"; Lucas Santtana – "De Coletivo ou de Metrô"; Marcelo Bonfá – "Depois da Chuva"; Pedro Luís e a Parede – "Rap do Real" (Editor: Leonardo Domingues)	**O Rappa – "Minha Alma (A Paz Que Eu Não Quero)" (Director of Photography: André Horta)**; Lenine – "Paciência" (Director of Photography: Adriano Goldman); Marcelo Bonfá – "Depois da Chuva"; Marisa Monte – "Amor I Love You"; Maurício Manieri – "Pensando em Você (Shining Star)"
Best Animation in a Video
**Andrea Marquee – "O Que Aconteceu com Nosso Amor" (Animation Director: Sylvain Barré)**; Charlie Brown Jr. – "Não Deixe o Mar Te Engolir" (Animation Director: Paolo Conti); Flu – "Suellen" (Animation Director: Allan Sieber); Maria do Relento – "O Vagabundo" (Animation Director: Diego de Godoy); Radar Tantã – "Na Dúvida Atire" (Animation Director: César Maurício)
