= Fardado =

Single by Titãs

from the album Nheengatu
- Released: May 2014
- Recorded: February–March 2014, São Paulo
- Genre: Punk rock, alternative rock
- Label: Som Livre
- Songwriter(s): Paulo Miklos; Sérgio Britto
- Producer(s): Rafael Ramos

Titãs singles chronology
"Porque Eu Sei que É Amor" (2009)	"Fardado" (2014)

Music video
- "Fardado" on YouTube

"Fardado" (Uniformed) is a single by Brazilian rock band Titãs, released in 2014. It is the first single of their fourteenth album Nheengatu as well as the album's opening track. A short preview of the track was released in April 2014, when the album became available for pre-order.

The track criticizes the police and is viewed by some as an update to their 1986 hit "Polícia", off their Cabeça Dinossauro album.

== Lyrics ==
The song's introductory verse ("Você também é explorado - fardado!", which can be translated as "You are also exploited - uniformed (guy)!") was inspired by a sign seen amidst the 2013 protests in Brazil, held by a woman in front of a battalion of the military police, a sign that read: "Fardado, você também é explorado" ("Uniformed, you are also exploited).

Commenting on the track's resemblance to "Polícia", guitarist Tony Bellotto said that they have similar critics, but with different focuses. He explained:

Since "Polícia", in 86, there had already been the idea of saying that the police is necessary, of course. A society without it is unimaginable, but what we still perceive in Brazil today, unfortunately, is a police that is, many times, truculent, unprepared to play its role. A police that is also, sometimes, exploited.

Keyboardist, bassist, vocalist and co-writer Sérgio Britto said that the idea of the song is to focus on the fact that police officers are also victims of exploitation and, as such, should refrain from repressing demonstrations of other exploited people.

This is a little different focus, but the institution may have, like everything in Brazil, gotten better. However, as democracy improves, challenges are bigger. Demonstrations in Brazil as they have been happening [in reference to the 2013 protests in Brazil) didn't use to happen, and it is necessary that we have a prepared police to deal with it.

In another interview, he stated:

They ("Polícia" and "Fardado") look like as Brazil hasn't changed much in all these years. Situations repeat themselves, some have changed for the worse. "Fardado" is more about citizenship, it reflects the way people face police.

In his personal blog, he wrote a letter of clarification in response to people criticizing the band for supposedly supporting crime or willing to gratuitously depreciate the institution's image.

== Music video ==
The single received a video, directed by Oscar Rodrigues Alves, who also co-directed the documentary Titãs – A Vida Até Parece Uma Festa, about the band's history. In the video, the members of the band are seen with clown make ups, in reference to the way people feel about their rights. The theme was a suggestion of Alves himself, who wanted the video to show a not so obvious interpretation of the lyrics, that is, a video with no direct references to the 2013 protests.

== Track listing ==
No.	Title	Music	Length
1.	"Fardado"	Sérgio Britto/Paulo Miklos	2:29

== Personnel ==
- Sérgio Britto - lead vocals
- Paulo Miklos - guitar, backing vocals
- Tony Bellotto - guitar
- Branco Mello - bass, backing vocals

Session member

- Mario Fabre - drums
