= 1996 MTV Video Music Brazil =

Award ceremony

- Date: 22 August 1996
- Location: Anhembi Convention Center, São Paulo, São Paulo
- Country: Brazil
- Hosted by: Pedro Cardoso
- Most awards: Os Paralamas do Sucesso (3)

Television/radio coverage
- Network: MTV Brasil

The 1996 MTV Video Music Brazil was held on 22 August 1996, at the Anhembi Convention Center in São Paulo, honoring the best Brazilian music videos. The ceremony was hosted by actor Pedro Cardoso.

== Winners and nominees ==
Winners are listed first and highlighted in bold.

Video of the Year	Best New Artist
**Os Paralamas do Sucesso – "Lourinha Bombril"**; Barão Vermelho – "Vem Quente Que Eu Estou Fervendo"; Chico Science & Nação Zumbi – "Manguetown"; Raimundos – "I Saw You Saying"; Titãs – "Eu Não Aguento"	**Karnak – "Comendo Uva na Chuva"**; Baba Cósmica – "Sábado de Sol"; Funk'n'Lata – "Não é Mole Não"; Humberto Effe – "O Preto e o Branco"; Mestre Ambrósio – "Se Zé Limeira Sambasse Maracatu"
Best Pop Video	Best MPB Video
**Skank – "Garota Nacional"**; Chico Science & Nação Zumbi – "Manguetown"; Fernanda Abreu – "Veneno da Lata"; Os Paralamas do Sucesso – "Lourinha Bombril"; Pato Fu – "Pinga"	**Nando Reis – "A Fila"**; Daúde – "Véu Vava"; Falcão – "Holliday Foi Muito"; João Marcelo Bôscoli, Simoninha and Cláudio Zoli – "Flor do Futuro"; Ney Matogrosso and Chico Buarque – "Até o Fim"
Best Rock Video	Best Rap Video
**Barão Vermelho – "Vem Quente Que Eu Estou Fervendo"**; Raimundos – "I Saw You Saying"; Sepultura – "Roots Bloody Roots"; Titãs – "Eu Não Vou Dizer Nada"; Titãs – "Eu Não Aguento"	**Gabriel, o Pensador – "Rabo de Saia"**; Câmbio Negro – "A Volta"; Código 13 – "Raças Diferentes"; MC Júnior and MC Leonardo – "Rap das Armas"; Pavilhão 9 – "Apaga o Baseado"
Best Demo Video	Best Direction in a Video
**Mulheres Q Dizem Sim – "Eu Sou Melhor Que Você"**; Devotos do Ódio – "Punk Rock Hard Core"; Las Ticas Tienen Fuego – "Nossa Festa"; Nei Van Soria – "Tempestade"; Personagens – "A Música Falada"	**Os Paralamas do Sucesso – "Lourinha Bombril" (Directors: Andrucha Waddington, Breno Silveira, Gualter Pupo and Toni Vanzolini)**; Barão Vermelho – "Vem Quente Que Eu Estou Fervendo" (Director: Gringo Cardia); Chico Science & Nação Zumbi – "Manguetown" (Director: Gringo Cardia); Pato Fu – "Pinga" (Directors: Cláudio Torres, José Henrique Fonseca and Ralph Strelow); Raimundos – "I Saw You Saying" (Director: Raul Machado)
Best Editing in a Video	Best Cinematography in a Video
**Os Paralamas do Sucesso – "Lourinha Bombril" (Editors: Sérgio Mekler, Joana Ventura and Fábio Gavião)**; Barão Vermelho – "Vem Quente Que Eu Estou Fervendo" (Editor: Henrique Tartarotti); João Marcelo Bôscoli, Simoninha and Cláudio Zoli – "Flor do Futuro" (Editors: Alexandre Cruz and Oscar Rodrigues); Pato Fu – "Pinga" (Editor: Ralph Strelow); Titãs – "Eu Não Aguento" (Editor: Humberto Martini)	**Marina Lima – "Beija-Flor" (Director of Photography: Márcia Ramalho)**; Barão Vermelho – "Vem Quente Que Eu Estou Fervendo" (Director of Photography: Márcia Ramalho); Chico Science & Nação Zumbi – "Manguetown" (Director of Photography: Roberto Amadeo); Engenheiros do Hawaii – "A Promessa" (Director of Photography: Paulo Wainer); Pato Fu – "Pinga" (Director of Photography: Ralph Strelow)
Viewer's Choice	Sim Award
**Skank – "Garota Nacional"**; Baba Cósmica – "Sábado de Sol"; Barão Vermelho – "Vem Quente Que Eu Estou Fervendo"; Chico Science & Nação Zumbi – "Manguetown"; Engenheiros do Hawaii – "A Promessa"; Fernanda Abreu – "Veneno da Lata"; Os Paralamas do Sucesso – "Lourinha Bombril"; Pato Fu – "Qualquer Bobagem"; Raimundos – "Eu Quero Ver o Oco"; Renato Russo – "Strani Amori"; Sepultura – "Roots Bloody Roots"; Titãs – "Eu Não Aguento"	**Raimundos – "I Saw You Saying"**
