= Oscar Rodrigues Alves =

Brazilian film director

- Born: September 29, 1969 (age 56); São Paulo, Brazil
- Occupations: Film director, editor, producer, screenwriter, web entrepreneur
- Years active: 1987–present

Oscar Rodrigues Alves (also known as Oscar Rodrigues Alves Neto), born September 29, 1969, is a Brazilian film director, editor, producer and web entrepreneur. He is a founder of MTV Brasil as well as the writer, editor and director of Titãs – A Vida Até Parece Uma Festa (Titãs - Life Even Looks Like a Party), a 2008 Brazilian documentary about the rock band Titãs from its inception. The documentary was the recipient of the 2009 MTV Video Music Brazil Best Musical Documentary or Movie award. He also won the 2002 Video of the Year, Best Rock Video and Viewer's Choice for Titãs' Epitáfio. He has won 10 MTV Video Music Brazil awards since 2001.

== Early life ==
Alves' great-grandfather, Francisco de Paula Rodrigues Alves, was the 5th President of Brazil. His grandfather and namesake, Oscar Rodrigues Alves, was a politician, a doctor and fostered Alves' pursuit of a career in film. He was one of the sponsors of the 1922 Week of Modern Art that took place in São Paulo, bringing together important Brazilian and foreign painters, sculptors, writers, musicians in São Paulo at the Theatro Municipal, the city's opera theatre.

When his son Francisco — Alves' father — was born in 1928, he bought a 16mm Eastman Kodak film camera to shoot his baby. Francisco would later continue this and film his children (Patricia, Angela, Flavia and Oscar) on 16 mm and Super8. When Oscar was born, the family owned numerous cameras. Film cameras were Alves' first toys.

== Career ==
Alves graduated in journalism by the University of São Paulo in 1990. His career on TV began in 1987, while still studying, as assistant director of Rede Bandeirantes' TV news program Jornal de Vanguarda. He later was a reporter for Folha de S. Paulo, a Brazilian daily newspaper, and editor at Sistema Brasileiro de Televisão's Jornal da Noite.

Alves was one of the founders of MTV Brasil, his first job as a director. Worked at Rede Globo as producer and editor of special reports for Fantástico in 1991. He returned to Grupo Abril (the then-owner of the Brazilian MTV franchise) in 1992 to launch the country's first cable television channel, TVA, where he created the network's programs department as production manager and later director for special shows.

In 1994, Alves started directing commercials for advertising agencies and clients from around the world, including Coca-Cola for McCann Erickson, McDonald's for TBWA\Paris, Ford for J. Walter Thompson and GDF Suez for Saatchi & Saatchi Paris, in addition to many others.

Alves started directing music videos in 1997. In 1999 he became partner at the Brazilian production company Academia de Filmes; in 2006 he founded his own company, Nuclear.

Alves released his first long-form film in 2009: "Titãs", on the 25th anniversary of the band and it was awarded Best Music Film at the 2009 MTV Video Music Brazil (VMB) Awards. In addition, he directed concert video releases from Titãs, Djavan, Cidade Negra, Zélia Duncan, Simoninha & Max de Castro, Zezé di Camargo & Luciano, Paralamas and Skank.

He is also an advisor and co-investor at EduK, an educational platform.

== Filmography ==
- 2000: Djavan ao Vivo
- 2002: Sortimento Vivo, Zélia Duncan
- 2004: Cosmotron, Skank
- 2004: Eu Me Transformo em Outras, Zélia Duncan
- 2006: Direto, Cidade Negra
- 2006: Pré Pós Tudo Bossa Band, Zélia Duncan
- 2008: Juntos e ao Vivo, Paralamas and Titãs
- 2009: Titãs - A Vida Até Parece uma Festa
- 2010: O Baile do Simonal
- 2010: Multishow Ao Vivo - Skank no Mineirão, Skank
- 2012: 20 Anos de Sucesso, Zezé Di Camargo & Luciano
- 2012: Cabeça Dinossauro ao Vivo 2012, Titãs

== Awards and honors ==
Alves' work has won 10 MTV Video Music Brazil awards — Titãs - A Vida Até Parece uma Festa in 2009 for Best Musical Documentary or Movie; Best Pop Video and Best Cinematography for Gabriel o Pensador's Palavras repetidas in 2005; Best Pop Video in 2004 for Skank's Vou deixar; Best Pop Video in 2003 for Skank's Dois Rios; Best Editing for Até Quando? in 2001 and Tem alguém aí in 2002, both for Gabriel O Pensador; Best Rock Video, Best Video of the Year and Viewer's Choice for Titãs' Epitáfio in 2002. He has been nominated more than 20 times for the award since 1996.

In addition, his video for Skank's Dois Rios won the Brazilian Association of Cinematography's Best Cinematography for a Music Video award for Adriano Goldman in 2005 and the same for Adrian Teijido in 2006 for Jota Quest's Além do Horizonte.
