= Perto de Deus =

Studio album by Cidade Negra
- Released: November 30, 2004
- Recorded: April – May 2004
- Genre: Reggae
- Label: Epic

Perto de Deus (in English: "Near God") is an album of Brazilian reggae band Cidade Negra, released in 2004.

== Track listing ==
1. Se Alguém Jah Amou (Da Gama, Garrido, Lazão) - 3:12
2. Perto de Deus (Da Gama, Farias, Garrido) - 3:39
3. Sinais (Garrido, Lazão) - 3:27
4. Selva de Pedra (Lazão, Marley, Yazbek) - 4:31
5. Eu Sei Que Ela (Garrido, Lazão, Yazbeck) - 3:29
6. Homem Que Faz a Guerra (Da Gama, Farias, Garrido, Lazão) - 4:31
7. Obrigado (Da Gama, Farias, Garrido) - 3:42
8. Além de Onda (Da Gama, Vilhena) - 4:01
9. Ancestrais (Garrido) - 3:52
10. Régia (Garrido) - 4:11
11. Dia Livre (Da Gama, Farias, Garrido) - 3:50
12. Busy Busy (Farias, Da Gama, Garrido, Lazão) - 4:16
13. Retratos da Vida (Da Gama, Meriti) - 3:58
14. Tô de Cara (Lazão) - 4:02

== Credits ==
- Keyboards: Aleix Meirelles, Jean Pierre
- Saxophone: Marcelo Martins
- Vocals: Gil Miranda
- Mixing: Collin "Bulbie" York
- Trumpet: Jessé Sadoc
- Trombone, arranger: Marlon Sette
- Executive producer: Leninha Brandão
- Guitar, arranger, composer: Sergio Yazbeck
- Art supervisor: Daniela Conolly, Sandro Mesquita
