= Rapunzel (Daniela Mercury song) =

Single by Daniela Mercury

from the album Feijão com Arroz
- Released: 1997
- Genre: Axé
- Length: 3:39
- Label: Epic
- Songwriters: Alaim Tavares, Carlinhos Brown

Daniela Mercury singles chronology
| "Nobre Vagabundo" (1996) | "Rapunzel" (1997) | "Minas com Bahia" (1996) |

"Rapunzel" is a song recorded by Brazilian singer Daniela Mercury for her fourth studio album Feijão com Arroz. The song was considered one of the Brazilian themes of the 1998 FIFA World Cup.

== Chart performance ==
The song reached No. 1 on the Brazilian music charts. The song also won a gold certification in France, selling more than 250,000 copies.

== Formats and track listing ==
- Brazil - CD single
1. "Rapunzel" - 3:40
- French - CD single
1. "Rapunzel" (Radio Mix) - 3:40
2. "Rapunzel" (Album Version) - 3:40

== Certifications ==
| Region | Certification | Certified units/sales |
|---|---|---|
| France (SNEP) | Gold | 250,000^{*} |
^{*} Sales figures based on certification alone.
