= Sacos Plásticos =

Studio album by Titãs
- Released: June 3, 2009
- Recorded: Midas Estúdios, from December 2008 to April 2009; Strings on "Porque Eu Sei que É Amor", "Deixa eu Sangrar" and "Quem Vai Salvar Você do Mundo?" recorded at Club 703 in Nashville, Tennessee by Marc Lacuesta
- Genre: Pop rock
- Length: 46:42
- Label: Arsenal Music; Universal Music (distribution)
- Producer: Rick Bonadio

Titãs chronology
MTV ao Vivo (2005)	Sacos Plásticos (2009)	Cabeça Dinossauro ao Vivo 2012 (2012)

Singles from Sacos Plásticos
- 1. "Antes de Você" Released: May 7, 2009; 2. "Porque Eu Sei que É Amor" Released: July 2009

Sacos Plásticos (Plastic Bags) is the thirteenth studio album released by Brazilian rock band Titãs. It is their first studio album since 2003, their longest non-album gap, and also the first released through Arsenal Music and with producer Rick Bonadio, who had already worked with Fresno, Charlie Brown Jr. and NX Zero. The album has significant influence from electronic elements.

It is the last album to feature drummer Charles Gavin, as well as the first album since Televisão in which he isn't credited for songwriting and composing.

The first single from the album, "Antes de Você", was featured at Caras & Bocas (a Rede Globo telenovela) soundtrack, and received radio airplay on May 7. The second single, "Porque Eu Sei que É Amor", was also featured at a Globo's telenovela: Cama de Gato.

The track "Deixa Eu Sangrar" was written by keyboardist and vocalist Sérgio Britto about his mother, who died in 2007.

The album won the 2009 Latin Grammy Award of Best Brazilian Rock Album, sharing it with Agora by NX Zero.

== Recording ==
The album was recorded at Estúdio Midas, in São Paulo. For the first time, Sérgio Britto played the bass.

40 songs were composed during the recording of Sacos Plásticos, but only 14 were featured on the album. Among these tracks, there are two partnerships: one with Andreas Kisser from Sepultura, who had already worked with Titãs in the song "Brasileiro" (from the album Domingo); and another with Arnaldo Antunes (ex-member) and Liminha (ex-producer).

== Reception ==
Professional ratings
Review scores
Source	Rating
Allmusic	3/5 stars

Sacos Plásticos received mixed to poor reviews from critics. Alexey Eremenko from allmusic praised the new direction taken by the band, but considered the album to be just a "passable listen" due to the amount of creative energy spent on "fooling around with those 'modernized' arrangements". José Flávio Júnior, from Folha de S.Paulo, advised fans that they were about to receive "an album with embarrassing moments, created by five musicians who should have already pursued individual careers a long time ago". Marcus Preto, also from Folha, published in the same issue a text comparing Titãs to their ex-bassist Nando Reis, who had at that time released his new solo album, Drês. According to him, both Nando and Arnaldo (who also pursued a solo career after leaving the band) learned a lot after going solo, and the same would probably happen to the remaining musicians, since "all of the members which continued in Titãs have already proved their individual talents, including works beyond music".

== Track listing ==
No.	Title	Music	Lead vocals	Length
1.	"Amor por Dinheiro" (Love for Money)	Sérgio Britto/Tony Bellotto	Sérgio Britto	2:33
2.	"Antes de Você" (Before You)	Paulo Miklos	Paulo Miklos	3:24
3.	"Sacos Plásticos" (Plastic Bags)	Branco Mello/Paulo Miklos	Branco Mello	3:09
4.	"Porque Eu Sei que É Amor" (Because I Know it's Love)	Sérgio Britto/Paulo Miklos	Paulo Miklos	3:18
5.	"A Estrada" (The Road)	Tony Bellotto/Sérgio Britto	Branco Mello	3:05
6.	"Agora Eu Vou Sonhar (contains a portion of Martin Luther King Jr.'s public speech "I Have a Dream", given on August 28, 1963 in Washington D.C.)" (Now I'm Going to Dream)	Sérgio Britto	Sérgio Britto	3:33
7.	"Quanto Tempo" (How Long)	Tony Bellotto	Paulo Miklos, Branco Mello and Sérgio Britto	3:23
8.	"Deixa eu Sangrar" (Let Me Bleed)	Sérgio Britto	Sérgio Britto	3:37
9.	"Problema" (Trouble)	Paulo Miklos/Arnaldo Antunes/Liminha	Paulo Miklos	3:55
10.	"Não Espere Perfeição" (Don't Expect Perfection)	Branco Mello/Sérgio Britto	Branco Mello	2:47
11.	"Quem Vai Salvar Você do Mundo?" (Who's Going to Save You From the World?)	Sérgio Britto	Sérgio Britto	3:27
12.	"Múmias" (Mummies)	Paulo Miklos	Paulo Miklos	3:49
13.	"Deixa Eu Entrar (featuring Andreas Kisser on guitar)" (Let Me In)	Tony Bellotto/Andreas Kisser/Sérgio Britto	Branco Mello	2:48
14.	"Nem Mais uma Palavra" (Not Another Word)	Sérgio Britto	Branco Mello	4:00

== Personnel ==
- Paulo Miklos - Lead vocals on tracks 2, 4, 9 and 12; co-lead vocals on 7; backing vocals on all tracks except 4, 7, 10 and 13; electric guitar on tracks 1, 2, 3, 5, 6, 7, 12 and 14.
- Branco Mello - Lead vocals on tracks 3, 5, 10, 13 and 14; co-lead vocals on 7; backing vocals on tracks 1, 6, 9 and 12; bass on tracks 1, 2, 4, 6, 7, 8, 9 and 11.
- Sérgio Britto - Lead vocals on tracks 1, 6, 8 and 11; co-lead vocals on 7; backing vocals on all tracks except 2, 7, 8 and 11; keyboards on tracks 2, 3, 4, 7, 11, 12 and 14; bass on tracks 3, 5, 10 and 13, piano on track 8, melodica on track 14.
- Tony Bellotto - Electric guitar on all tracks except 8 and 11, in which he plays acoustic guitar.
- Charles Gavin - Drums on all tracks except 9 and 12.

=== Additional personnel ===
- Rick Bonadio - Programming on tracks 1, 2, 3, 6, 7, 9, 12; electric guitar on tracks 1, 2, 6, 9, 11, 12, 13; acoustic guitar on tracks 2, 4; keyboards on tracks 1, 2, 3, 7, 12; percussion on track 4; bass on tracks 12 and 14; piano on track 14.
- Eric Silver - Arrangement of strings, violins and violas on tracks 4, 8, 11.
- Carole Rabinowitz - Cello on track 8.
- Andreas Kisser - electric guitar and backing vocals on track 13
