= Como uma Onda (song) =

1983 pop song by Lulu Santos

Song by Lulu Santos
- Recorded: 1983
- Genre: Pop
- Songwriters: Lulu Santos; Nelson Motta

Como uma Onda (Zen-Surfismo) is a Brazilian pop song by Lulu Santos and recorded in 1983, written by Lulu Santos himself and by the journalist and writer Nelson Motta especially to the soundtrack of the movie Garota Dourada, by Antônio Calmon. The song has been very much executed all over the country in the beginning of the 80s and it is still sung in the shows of the singer.

== Inspiration ==
According to Nelson Motta, who considers the song a modern bolero, the lyrics were inspired in Jorge Luis Borges and the book Zen in the Art of Archery, of the German philosopher Eugen Herrigel, and reflected the personal condition lived by Nelson with his zen philosophy at that time (when Motta himself was the owner of a notorious nightclub, Noites Cariocas, placed in the mount Pão de Açúcar).

== See also ==
- Música popular brasileira
