= Feijão com Arroz =

Studio album by Daniela Mercury
- Released: 1996; January 14, 1997 (North America/Europe)
- Genres: Axé, MPB
- Length: 57:48
- Label: Epic (Sony Music)
- Producers: Alfredo Moura, Rildo Hora

Daniela Mercury chronology
Música de Rua (1994)	Feijão com Arroz (1996)	Elétrica (1998)

Singles from Feijão com Arroz
- 1. "À Primeira Vista" Released: 1996; 2. "Nobre Vagabundo" Released: 1997; 3. "Rapunzel" Released: 1997; 4. "Minas com Bahia" Released: 1997; 5. "Feijão de Corda" Released: 1997

Professional ratings
Review scores
Source	Rating
Allmusic	4.5/5 stars

Feijão com Arroz (Portuguese for Rice and beans) is the fourth studio album by Daniela Mercury, released in 1996 in Brazil and on January 14, 1997, in North America and Europe through Sony Music.

Feijão com Arroz was the second best-selling album of Mercury's career, and which produced more hit songs in Brazilian radios, only behind O Canto da Cidade (1992). The first single was "À Primeira Vista", written by Chico César, the song went to #1 on Brazilian chart. The song was also included on the soundtrack of the soap opera O Rei do Gado (The King of Cattle), and became the most successful of the singer's career since O Canto da Cidade. The other album hit singles were "Nobre Vagabundo", "Rapunzel" (both number-one hits), "Minas com Bahia" (top-twenty hit) and "Feijão de Corda" (a top-ten hit). In addition to her success in Brazil, Feijão com Arroz became one of the best selling albums ever in Portugal, opening the door of the music market in the country for the singer; the album sold close to 250,000 copies in the Portuguese market, accumulating more than six platinum (a platinum record is equivalent to the sale of at least 40,000 copies). Feijão com Arroz made Daniela Mercury one of the most popular Brazilian artists ever in Portugal. This album also achieved minor success in a few European countries, such as France and Germany.

"Minas com Bahia" reached the top twenty on the Billboard Hot 100 Brazil chart.

== Background ==
The album, which was produced by Alfredo Moura (except for the track "Vide Gal", produced by Rildo Time), received a double platinum disc certification of the Brazilian Association of Record Producers. It was the third and so far last album of Mercury's career to receive a diamond disc.

The album's success was not limited to the public. It was very well received by critics, being considered as her best album, according to the evaluation of the All Music Guide. Daniela said about the album:

It's a very complex record. You can see it when I sing his songs live. There are many instruments of different percussion, and to transpose it to the stage takes a certain job. When we recorded, we got to stay three days mixing a single song. I think the record confirms the serious research I've been doing about everything I learned over the years with Carnival, with the electric trio, with regional northeastern rhythms. I have put everything on it, in terms of great quality.

== Artwork ==
On the cover of Feijão com arroz, photographed by Mario Cravo Neto, Daniela embraces a black model. The singer said that the photo epitomizes her work, "I am a white singer in the world of african blocks". A poll conducted by the Jornal da Globo website chose the album cover as the best in the history of Brazilian music, beating other covers by Titãs and Secos e Molhados.

== Track listing ==
No.	Title	Writer(s)	Length
1.	"Nobre Vagabundo"	Márcio Mello	3:54
2.	"Rapunzel"	Alaim Tavares, Carlinhos Brown	3:39
3.	"Minas com Bahia" (featuring Samuel Rosa)	Chico Amaral	3:17
4.	"Feijão de Corda" (featuring Banda Bragadá)	Ramon Cruz	3:24
5.	"Você Abusou"	Antônio Carlos e Jocáfi	4:20
6.	"Dona Canô"	Neguinho do Samba	3:26
7.	"Bate Couro"	Tavares, Gilson Babilonia	3:30
8.	"À Primeira Vista"	Chico César	4:45
9.	"Rede"	Tavares, Babilonia	4:29
10.	"Musa Calabar"	Guiguio	3:31
11.	"Vai Chover"	Gustavo de Dalva, Boghan Costa	3:39
12.	"Vestido de Chita"	Ivan Huol, Mercury	4:26
13.	"Do Carinho"	Dalva, Costa	3:51
14.	"Bandeira Flor"	Mello	4:22
15.	"Vide Gal"	Brown	3:15

== Awards ==
Year	Award	Category
1997	Prêmio Multishow de Música Brasileira	Best female singer
1997	Video Music Brasil	Best music video cinematography - "Nobre Vagabundo"

== Sales and certifications ==
Region	Certification	Certified units/sales
Brazil (Pro-Música Brasil)	2× Platinum	800,000
Portugal	—	300,000
