= Graziella Moretto =

Brazilian actress (born 1972)

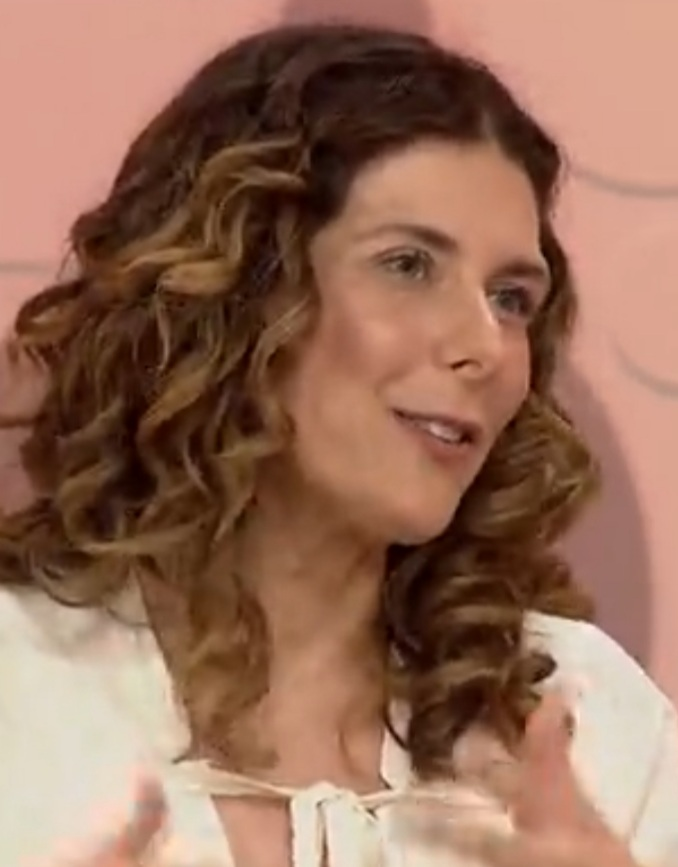
- Actress Graziella Moretto during an interview with the Sem Censura program, 2016
- Born: 15 May 1972 (age 53); Santos, São Paulo, Brazil
- Occupation: Actress
- Years active: 1995–2008; 2014–2017
- Spouses: Guilherme Maschietto Ayrosa (m. 2001; div. 2005) Pedro Cardoso (m. 2007)
- Children: 2

Graziella Moretto Figueiredo (born 15 May 1972) is a Brazilian actress.

She has acted in some motion pictures, such as Fernando Meirelles' City of God, and some TV shows.
