= Por Trás do Pano =

1999 film directed by Luiz Villaça

- Theatrical release poster
- Directed by: Luiz Villaça
- Written by: Luiz Villaça; Flávio de Souza
- Produced by: Érica Ferreira
- Starring: Denise Fraga; Pedro Cardoso; Luís Melo; Ester Góes; Marisa Orth
- Cinematography: Adrian Teijido
- Edited by: Idê Lacreta
- Music by: Dimi Kreeff
- Production companies: Nia Produções Artísticas; Cinema Distribuição Independente
- Distributed by: Cinema Distribuição Independente
- Release date: September 17, 1999
- Running time: 90 minutes
- Country: Brazil
- Language: Portuguese
- Budget: R$1.5 million
- Box office: R$118,411

Por Trás do Pano is a 1999 Brazilian comedy-drama film directed by Luiz Villaça. It stars Denise Fraga, Pedro Cardoso, Luís Melo, Ester Góes and Marisa Orth. The plot follows the story of Helena (Fraga), an insecure actress who is married to Marcos (Cardoso), as she receives an invitation to perform in a play alongside the famous actor Sérgio (Melo), who lives a conjugal crisis with his wife Laís (Orth) due to his involvement with his former wife Alexandra (Góes).

The filming took place in 1998 in the Municipal Theatre of the city of Americana, in the state of São Paulo.

== Cast ==
- Denise Fraga as Helena
- Pedro Cardoso as Marcos
- Luís Melo as Sérgio
- Ester Góes as Alexandra
- Marisa Orth as Laís
- Gianni Ratto as Seu José
- Angela Dip as Helô
- Dalton Vigh as Tony
- Milhem Cortaz as Puck

== Reception ==
Por Trás do Pano grossed R$118,411 and was watched by 22,109 people in the 7 Brazilian theaters in which it was released. It was nominated for four Grande Prêmio Cinema Brasil: Best Film, Best Director, Best Screenplay and Best Actress, and Denise Fraga was awarded for Best Actress at the 1st Grande Prêmio Cinema Brasil. At the 27th Festival de Gramado, it received the Popular Jury's Choice of Best Brazilian Film, and Best Actress (Fraga). It was awarded at the 7th Festival de Cinema de Cuiabá for Best Editing (Idê Lacreta), Best Actor (Luís Melo), and Best Actress (Fraga), and at the 10th Festival de Cinema de Natal for Best Screenplay. Fraga also won Best Actress at the 21st Havana Film Festival, and at the Miami Hispanic Film Festival.
