= Porque Eu Sei que É Amor =

Single by Titãs

from the album Sacos Plásticos
- Released: July 2009
- Genre: Alternative rock
- Label: Arsenal Music
- Songwriter(s): Sérgio Britto; Paulo Miklos
- Producer(s): Rick Bonadio

Titãs singles chronology
"Antes de Você" (2009)	"Porque Eu Sei que É Amor" (2009)	"Fardado" (2014)

"Porque Eu Sei que É Amor" is a single by Titãs, released in July 2009. It is composed by Sérgio Britto and Paulo Miklos and sung by the latter. The song is featured at the soundtrack of Rede Globo's telenovela Cama de Gato.

The song reached No. 14 at Brasil Hot 100 Airplay and No. 8 at the Brasil Hot Pop.

== Music video ==
A music video for the single was released. The video features images of some women, with close-ups of their faces. Paulo Miklos, Tony Bellotto and Branco Mello are briefly shown through the video, directed by Branco Mello himself and Diana Bouth.

== Personnel ==
- Paulo Miklos - Lead vocals
- Branco Mello - Bass guitar
- Tony Bellotto - Electric guitar
- Sérgio Britto - Keyboards and backing vocals
- Charles Gavin - Drums
- Rick Bonadio - Acoustic guitar and percussion
- Eric Silver - Violins, Violas and String arrangement (string were recorded in Nashville, Tennessee, at Studio Club 703 by Marc Lacuesta
