= À Primeira Vista (song) =

Single by Daniela Mercury

from the album Feijão com Arroz
- Released: 1996
- Genre: Axé, MPB, Rock
- Length: 4:45
- Label: Epic
- Songwriter: Chico César

Daniela Mercury singles chronology
"Por Amor ao Ilê" (1994)	"À Primeira Vista" (1996)	"Nobre Vagabundo" (1996)

"À Primeira Vista" (Portuguese for "At First Sight") is a song originally recorded by Brazilian singer and songwriter Chico César for the album Aos Vivos (1995) and recorded by the Brazilian female singer Daniela Mercury in 1996, for her fourth studio album Feijão com Arroz. It was produced by Alfredo Moura and released as lead single of the album by Epic Records.

== Background and recording ==
On an interview for the Canal Bis, singer and songwriter Chico César said:

"'À Primeira Vista' has a curious birth. Something like 'when' occurred to me. The first verse was: "Quando eu não tinha nada eu quis/When I did not have anything I wanted" and the last was: "Quando vi você me apaixonei/When I saw you I fell in love". But in between there was a lot of 'when'. "Quando bebi demais vomitei/When I drank too much, I threw up", "Quando ouvi Hendrix pirei/When I heard Hendrix, I freaked out". Then I thought: Damn, these first verse and the last has something in common. All these in between, almost thirty, they are all crazy in my head. Then I said: This is a love song."

When Daniela Mercury's young sister went to live in São Paulo, César gave her a copy of the album Aos Vivos, and she sent a tape with the song to her older sister. As soon as she heard it, the song got "completely stuck" in the singer's head. After César had promised the song to Mercury, other singers like Maria Bethânia, Elba Ramalho and Zizi Possi also got interested in recording the track. Ramalho said: "À Primeira Vista" was the song that got me. When I heard I said: 'I'm on it". When the song was released as lead single of Mercury's album Feijão com Arroz in 1996, César said: "I tuned into Musical FM, and then "Primeira vista" started to play. It was a shock to me: Damn, they're playing my song!"

Mercury said:

"Two years ago, I would released the album with a song like 'Rapunzel', or other dancing song. But now, I don't have nothing more to prove. This time, the focus it's on the song. It's the melody that moves. They can get sick of music, but the album has other different songs."

== Success ==
The song was a huge success in Brazil, reaching the #1 spot on charts, becoming Mercury's biggest hit single since O Canto da Cidade" (1992). The song was included on the soundtrack of the telenovela O Rei do Gado (Rede Globo).

== Awards and nominations ==
Year	Award	Nomination	Result
1996	Melhores do Ano	Song of the Year	

== Charts ==
Chart (1996)	Peak position
Brazil—Crowley Broadcast Analysis	1
