= SNJ (group) =

- Also known as: Somos Nós a Justiça
- Origin: Guarulhos
- Genres: Rap

SNJ (an acronym for Somos Nós a Justiça) was a Brazilian rap group formed in 1996 in Guarulhos, São Paulo State.

The group went through several lineup changes in its early years before achieving national success in 2000 with the release of the album Somos Nós. The record featured their most famous hit, "Se tu Lutas, tu Conquistas," and the track "Viajando na Balada," which earned them a nomination for Best Rap Video at the MTV Video Music Brasil in 2001.

Their next major album, O Show Deve Continuar, was released in 2003. After releasing a live DVD in 2005 and another studio album in 2007, the group's activity began to slow down. Their final release was a limited-edition EP titled Origens in 2012. Since then, SNJ has been on an indefinite hiatus with no new material. The members have pursued solo careers or faced personal challenges. While there has been no official announcement of a breakup, the group is considered inactive.

== Albums ==
- 1998 : A Sigla
- 2001 : Se tu Lutas, tu Conquistas
- 2003 : O Show Deve Continuar
- 2005 : Ao Vivo
- 2007 : A Esperança é o Alimento da Alma
- 2012 : Origens
