= Scarlet Moon de Chevalier =

Brazilian actress, journalist, and writer

Scarlet Moon de Chevailer
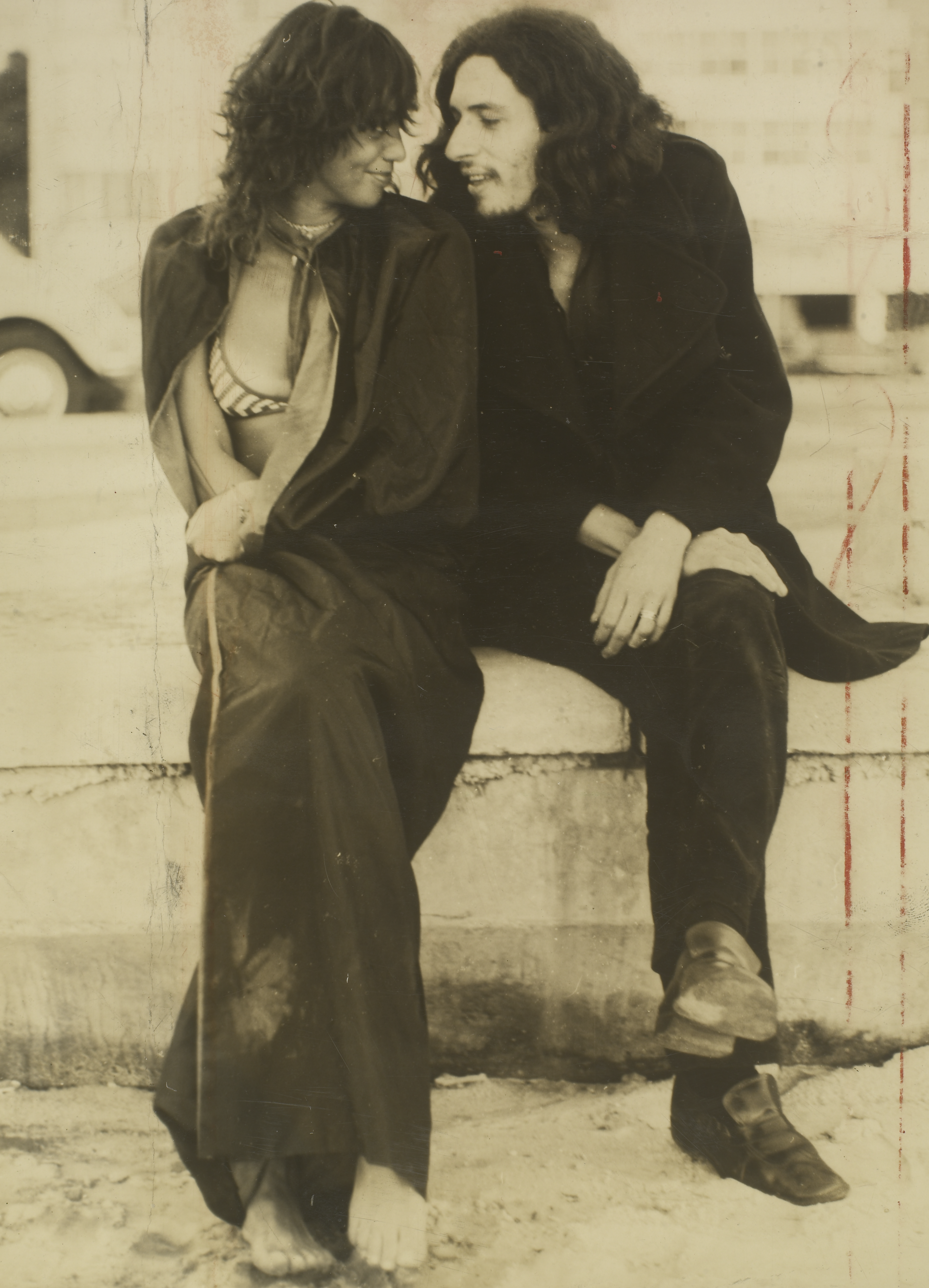
- Torquato Neto & Scarlet Moon Chevalier
- Born: September 12, 1950; Rio de Janeiro, Brazil
- Died: June 5, 2013 (aged 62); Rio de Janeiro, Brazil
- Other names: Scarlet Moon
- Occupations: Actress, journalist, writer
- Spouse: Lulu Santos (m. 1978; div. 2006)

Scarlet Moon de Chevalier (12 September 1950 – 5 June 2013) was a Brazilian actress, journalist, and writer who died of multiple system atrophy on 5 June 2013 at the age of 62. She was married to singer Lulu Santos for 28 years.
