= Titãs – A Vida Até Parece Uma Festa =

2008 film directed by Branco Mello

Titãs - A Vida Até Parece Uma Festa
- Theatrical poster.
- Directed by: Branco Mello; Oscar Rodrigues Alves
- Written by: Branco Mello; Oscar Rodrigues Alves
- Produced by: Angela Figueiredo; Paulo Roberto Schmidt; Maria Clara Fernandez; Fábio Zavala; Cristina Fantato
- Starring: Arnaldo Antunes; Branco Mello; Charles Gavin; Marcelo Fromer; Nando Reis; Paulo Miklos; Sérgio Britto; Tony Bellotto
- Music by: Titãs
- Distributed by: Moviemobz
- Release dates: September 25, 2008 (Rio de Janeiro International Film Festival); January 16, 2009 (Brazil)
- Running time: 100 minutes
- Country: Brazil
- Language: Portuguese

Titãs – A Vida Até Parece Uma Festa (lit. Titãs - Life Even Looks Like a Party) is a 2008 documentary featuring the career of the Brazilian rock band Titãs since its beginning. It features the tapes recorded by Branco Mello when he earned his VHS camera in the early 1980s. This documentary was awarded the 2009 VMB Award for Musical Movie/Documentary of the Year.

== Background ==
Branco Mello used his camera to record several moments in shows, studios, hotel rooms, airports and any other kind of backstage actions. His bandmates and him recorded the images and sound in formats such as VHS, Hi-8, Super 8 e mini DV.

In 2002, Branco Mello invited the award-winning Oscar Rodrigues Alves, who had already directed the promotional clip for "Epitáfio", to write and direct the film. Together, they selected videos among the more than 200 hours of recorded material. They also searched at television networks for promotional videos, talk shows and interviews. All of that material combined, was able to tell the story of the band through shows, national and international tours, music festivals and important moments like the death of Marcelo Fromer, and the departure of Arnaldo Antunes and Nando Reis. It took them six years to edit the film because they would only be able to do that during their free-time.
