= Nobre Vagabundo =

Single by Daniela Mercury

from the album Feijão com Arroz
- Released: 1996
- Genre: Axé
- Length: 3:54
- Label: Epic
- Songwriter(s): Márcio Mello

Daniela Mercury singles chronology
"À Primeira Vista" (1996)	"Nobre Vagabundo" (1996)	"Rapunzel" (1996)

"Nobre Vagabundo" (Portuguese for "Noble Bum" or "Noble Wanderer") is a song composed by Marcio Mello and recorded by the Brazilian singer Daniela Mercury, recorded for her fourth studio album, Feijão com Arroz.

== Critic reception ==
The British magazine The Beat said that jewelry like "Nobre Vagabundo" fulfill what is the most mature album by Mercury. The Brazilian magazine Veja said that the track was meant to be the album's big hit. Howard J. Blumenthal, writer of the book The World Music CD Listener's Guide, said that Mercury's vocals without any instrumental was "amazing".

== Formats and track listings ==
- Portugal CD single
1. Nobre Vagabundo" - 3:35

== Chart performance ==
Following the success of "À Primeira Vista", "Nobre Vagabundo" became the second consecutive single of the album to reach No. 1 on the Billboard Hot 100 Brazil.

Chart (1997)	Pea
Brazil—Hot 100 Brasil	1
