= Pedro Luís e a Parede =

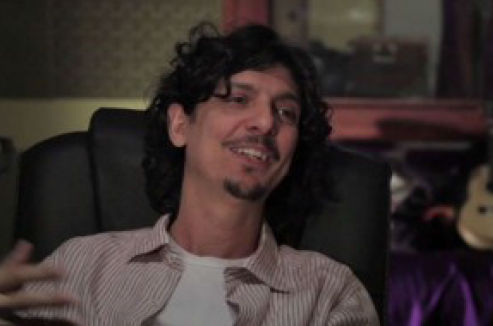

Background information
- Origin: Brazil
- Genres: Rock, samba, funk, hip hop
- Years active: 1996–present
- Labels: Universal Music, EMI, WEA
- Members: Pedro Luís; Mário Moura; Sidon Silva; C.A. Ferrari; Celso Alvim
- Website: www.plap.com.br

Pedro Luís e a Parede (lit. "Pedro Luis and the Wall") are a Brazilian musical group that mixes rock, samba, rap and funk. the group is composed by Pedro Luís (lead vocals and acoustic guitar), Mário Moura (bass guitar), Sidon Silva, C.A. Ferrari and Celso Alvim (all three do the percussion).

== Discography ==
- 1997 – Astronauta Tupy - Dubas/WEA
- 1999 - É Tudo 1 Real - WEA
- 2001 - Zona e Progresso - Universal Music/MP,B
- 2004 - Vagabundo - Universal Music
- 2008 - Ponto Enredo - EMI

=== Compilations ===
- 2006 - Seleção 1997-2004 - Universal/MP,B
