= DMN (group) =

- Also known as: Homem de H.aço
- Origin: São Paulo, Brazil
- Genres: Gangsta rap, Hip hop, Rap, Rap gangsta, Rap nacional
- Years active: 1989–present
- Label: Cosa Nostra
- Members: Markão II, Elly, Max and DJ Slick
- Past members: Elly Efi, Xis

DMN is a rap group from São Paulo, Brazil, formed in 1989 by members Markão II, Elly, Max and DJ Slick. He achieved success with the song "Man of Steel", awarded in Hutúz as one of the best of the decade.

== Career ==
=== History of the DMN ===
The DMN started in 1989 when four people involved in rhyme battles in São Paulo came together to found a group. They were Markão II, Elly, Max and DJ Slick. The first major appearance of the group was in the collection Black Consciousness, Vol II, in the song "It is not done," which told of racism against blacks around the world. The following year, the band released their first original work, the album Increasingly Black, with songs like "4P" and "How Can Be Alright".

The group's success started with the composition of the song "Man of Steel" in 1998, which had great popularity among young people and constant placements in media outlets. The song has a special appearance by Edi Rock of Rational MCs, who was nominated for the Video Music Brazil 1998 [4] and was voted one of the best songs of the decade in Hutúz Prize in 2009. The second album, called Emergency Exit was produced by Edi Rock, especially the songs "Cisco" and "Racists suckers" (with Mano Brown, Edi Rock and KL Jay); album in which the group company is in the national rap scale. In the same year, they had three nominees in Hutúz: Slick on Dj Group, Emergency Exit for Album of the Year and the group itself in the Artist of the Year.

In 2002, they launched the CD DMN: Live also available on DVD, and the DMN launched in 2003 its fourth work, expected by fans, called This is the scene with the title track and songs "Jao", which was one of the most played on the radio in Brazil in the year. Elly produced the record while Markão II wrote most of the lyrics. The CD also featured Lino Krizz, Sandrão and mayonnaise (SP Funk). The theme was mainly social difference, but also had relaxation and love on two tracks.

Currently, in addition to compose music, the members of the DMN has participated in projects that plan to the awareness of young people in suburbs around the country, and also promote lectures, debates and community incentives.

== Discography ==
=== Studio albums ===
- 1992 - "Cada Vez Mais Preto"
- 1997 - "H.Aço"
- 2001 - "Saída de Emergência"
- 2004 - "Essa é a Cena"
- 2013 - "9 Anos Depois Epílogo"
