= Cazé Peçanha =

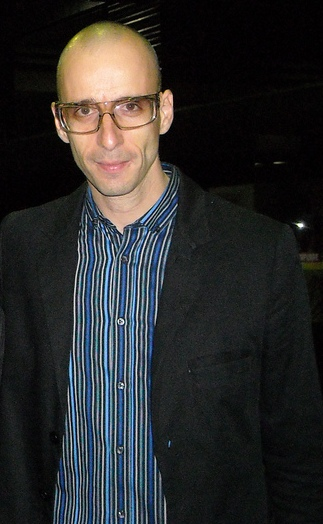
Cazé Peçanha at Campus Party Brazil in 2010

Cazé Peçanha, the screen name of Carlos José de Araújo Peccini, (born in Rio de Janeiro, January 7, 1968) is a Brazilian television host.

On television since 1994, he hosted MTV's first live show called Teleguiado. In the 16 years during which he worked for the channel – from 1994 to 1999 and from 2002 to 2012 – he was part of productions like “VJ por Um Dia” [VJ for a Day], “Buzzina MTV”, “Casal Neura” [Neurotic Couple], and “Notícias MTV” [MTV News].

He worked at Globo TV from 2000 to 2001, where he hosted “Sociedade Anônima”, the first TV show to feature an online audience, and he played “Homem-Megafone” [Megaphone Man] on “Fantástico”.

Currently, Cazé is on Band TV, in charge of stories on the “A Liga” [The League] show, and on pay-TV channel Nat Geo, ahead of “Os Incríveis - O Grande Desafio” [The Incredibles – The Great Challenge], a competition between extraordinary minds.

Having worked for more than 20 years on television, the Rio de Janeiro host, currently living in São Paulo, has been the host of TV programs on which audience participation and appreciation of ordinary people were key.

In 1999, Cazé received the best host award from the APCA [São Paulo Association of Art Critics]. In 2002, he received a prize from Instituto Ayrton Senna for the show, “Tome Conta do Brasil” [Take Care of Brazil], where he encouraged young people to participate in politics. In 2005, he received another award from the APCA, this time along with the creators of MTV's first cartoon, “Megaliga de VJs Paladinos” [Mega League of Paladin-VJs].

In addition to his work in front of the cameras, Cazé is also an entrepreneur in the cultural area. He is a partner in cartoon producer Estricnina, which is responsible for works like “Fudêncio e seus Amigos” [Fudêncio and his Friends] and “Infortúnio MTV com a Funérea” [MTV Misfortune with Funérea], and created Gengibre, Brazil's first voice posts website. He is also the owner of Gafanhoto – a producer that in 2007 held discussions and classes on new cultures.
