= Golden Shower (band) =

Brazilian electronic music duo

Golden Shower is an electronic music duo from São Paulo, Brazil, consisting of Markus Karlus and Kevin Rodgers.

Their 2000 music video, Video Computer System, was the winner of the MTV Brasil Video Music Awards, in the category of Best Electronic Music Video.
