= Pedro Cardoso (actor) =

Brazilian actor, screenwriter, playwright and television director

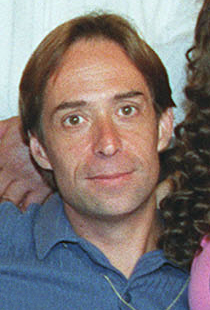
- Cardoso in 2001
- Born: 31 December 1962 (age 63); Rio de Janeiro, Brazil
- Occupations: Actor, screenwriter, playwright, television director
- Years active: 1982–present
- Spouses: Maristela Cardoso (m. 1988, divorced) Graziella Moretto (m. 2007)
- Children: 3
- Relatives: Fernando Henrique Cardoso (cousin)

Pedro Cardoso Martins Moreira (born 31 December 1962) is a Brazilian actor, screenwriter, playwright and television director. He is best known for his role as Agostinho Carrara on the Rede Globo sitcom A Grande Família, for which he was nominated for an International Emmy Award for best actor.

== Early life ==
Pedro Cardoso was born in the Zona Sul area of Rio de Janeiro, the second of six children in a prominent family. His father was a well-succeed lawyer, while his grandfather was the president of Banco do Brasil. He is also a second cousin to Fernando Henrique Cardoso, a former President of Brazil.

== Career ==
Cardoso left home when he was at 18 years due to "paternal guidance and youthful pride". He started to work on theaters as an illuminator. Eventually, he debuted as a stage actor in 1980. In 1982, he debuted as playwright with Bar Doce Bar, a play co-authored by Felipe Pinheiro, in which Cardoso was also an actor. He received a Troféu Mambembe for best newcomer actor. Since then, he has directed and wrote several plays along with Pinheiro, and alone before Pinheiro's death, as well as acted in them. He also worked in television as an actor, director and screenwriter. He has also a career in cinema; working mostly as an actor, he co-wrote Lisbela e o Prisioneiro, and produced Todo Mundo Tem Problemas Sexuais.

== Personal life ==
He is the father of three girls. The first two, Luiza and Maria, were born to his former wife Maristela. His youngest child is Mabel, which is the daughter to him and actress Graziella Moretto.

== Selected filmography ==
- TV Pirata (1988; screenwriter)
- Vamp (1991)
- Anos Rebeldes (1992)
- Four Days in September (1997)
- Por Trás do Pano (1999)
- Bossa Nova (2000)
- A Grande Família (2001-2014)
- The Man Who Copied (2003)
- Lisbela e o Prisioneiro (2003; screenwriter)
- Redeemer (2004)
- Casa da Mãe Joana (2008)
- Barata Ribeiro, 716 (2016)
