= Gabriel o Pensador =

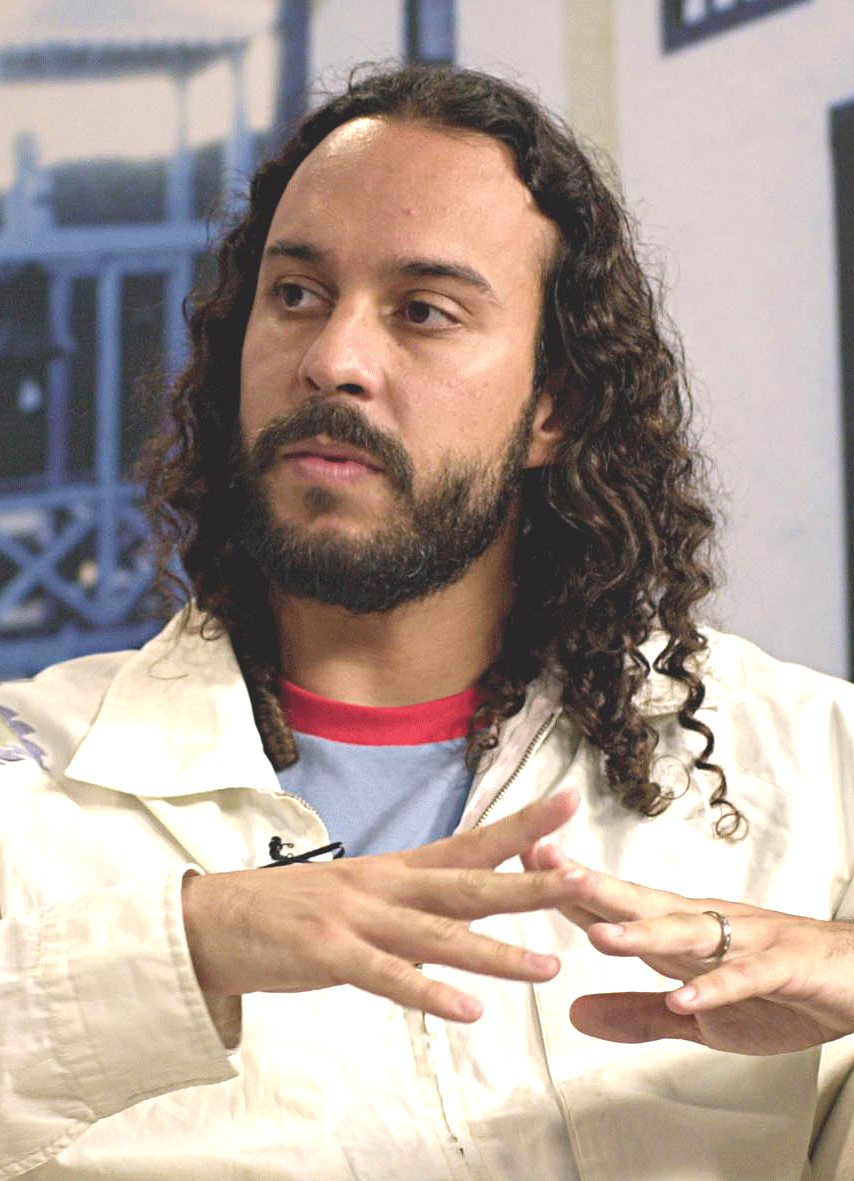

Background information
- Born: Gabriel Contino; March 4, 1974 (age 52); Rio de Janeiro, Brazil
- Genres: Hip hop
- Occupations: Rapper, writer, composer
- Years active: 1992–present
- Label: Sony-BMG
- Website: www.gabrielopensador.com.br

Gabriel Contino (born March 4, 1974), better known as Gabriel o Pensador (Portuguese for "Gabriel the Thinker") is a Brazilian rapper, writer, and composer known for his conscious lyrics which speak of activism, and issues of race, politics, social problems, and the Catholic church. Gabriel began his music career when he launched a demo tape containing the song "Tô Feliz (Matei o Presidente)" I'm Happy (I killed the President) landing him a contract with Sony Music. Since then he has released eight albums: Ainda É Só o Começo, Quebra-Cabeça, Nádegas a Declarar, Gabriel o Pensador, Seja Você Mesmo (mas não Seja sempre o Mesmo), MTV ao Vivo, Cavaleiro Andante and Sem Crise (this last one was released independently). Gabriel has also written three books: Diário Noturno, Um Garoto Chamado Rorbeto and Meu Pequeno Rubro-Negro. Um Garoto Chamado Rorbeto won the Prêmio Jabuti, for best Children's literature.

== Biography ==
Coming from a middle-class family, a unique background among Brazilian rappers, Gabriel is the son of a well known journalist in Brazil. He received his hit fame in 1992 with the song "Tô Feliz (Matei o Presidente)" ("I'm happy, I've killed the president"), the debut single from his first and eponymous album. This song was written in protest of President Fernando Collor de Mello and his corrupt administration. Gabriel's mother was Collor's press secretary. The same album also yielded other hits, including "Lôrabúrra" ("Dumb Blonde", shortened) and "Retrato de um Playboy" ("Portrait of a Playboy"), bringing hip hop mainstream attention in Brazil by catering to the middle class. Although rapping about everyday life, Gabriel also found time to talk about social injustices with his fourth single, "O Resto do Mundo" ("The Leftovers of the World", a pun on the word for "leftovers" and "rest" being the same in Portuguese), a more downbeat track about homeless life, with a purposefully depressive melody and flow. Gabriel was "notorious for his biting attacks on some of the major ills of Brazilian society: poverty, racism, violence."

His following albums were also commercially successful, with a careful blend of socially relevant tracks mixed with airwave-minded pop anthems. His third album, Quebra-Cabeça, was released in 1997 and sold over one million copies. History-minded, Gabriel was highly influenced by other Brazilian music, including bossa nova, samba and MPB, as well as using hip hop's traditional methods of sampling jazz, funk and disco ("2345meia78", for example, sampled Chic's "Good Times").

In 1994, while touring in Portugal, Gabriel's song "Lavagem Cerebral" (Brainwashing) was received with much praise. The piece was accepted as "a strong social critique of Brazilian society and of the ideology of the dominating classes."

Besides his native Brazil, Gabriel, o Pensador is also well known in other Lusophone countries such as Portugal, Angola, Cape Verde, Mozambique, and has worked with Portuguese musicians like Sérgio Godinho and General D. In 2004, he recorded his first song in English entitled, Who's The Enemy?, that appeared on American rapper Ithaka's album, Fishdaddy Flashbacks.

=== Other projects ===
The musician has also released three books: "Diário Noturno" (Brazil and Portugal; poems and short stories), "Um garoto chamado Rorbeto" (Brazil; fiction poetry for children) "Meu Pequeno Rubro-Negro" (Brazil; about children who support Flamengo, like himself). He has been a juror on the spelling bee contest "Soletrando" (in its second edition) on the program Caldeirão do Huck. Concerned about the truancy among a group of boys he helped in Rocinha, in Rio de Janeiro, Gabriel put his hands to work and created an NGO called "Pensando Junto"(Portuguese for Thinking Together), an organization serving a social, educational and cultural purpose for children and youth in the community of Rocinha, providing its participants with access to culture, education, leisure, food, medical, dental and psychological care. The organization offers tutoring and courses for a group of underprivileged children in the Rocinha district, located in Gabriel's hometown of Rio de Janeiro, where he still lives in today. Gabriel is also a member of the Dreams Can Be Foundation, a nonprofit charitable supporting organization and a Brazilian NGO dedicated to aiding street children and impoverished youth in Brazil, working in partnership with local organizations and NGOs to provide: education, moral and social development, humanitarian relief, and the offering of opportunities where there were none before.

== Discography ==
Studio Albums

Album Title	Album details	Peak chart positions			Sales	Certifications
Album Title	Album details	BRA	Top 30	POR	Sales	Certifications
Gabriel o Pensador	Released: 1993; Label: Sony Music; Format: CD	1	1	3	BRA: 750,000	ABPD: 3× Platinum
Ainda É só o Começo	Released: 1995; Label: Sony Music; Format: CD	1	2	—	BRA: 150,000	ABPD: Gold
Quebra-Cabeça	Released: 1997; Label: Sony Music; Format: CD	1	1	6	BRA: 1,500,000	ABPD: Platinum
Nádegas a Declarar	Released: 1999; Label: Sony Music; Format: CD	1	4	50	BRA: 250,000	ABPD: Gold
Seja Você Mesmo (mas não Seja sempre o Mesmo)	Released: May 15, 2001; Label: Sony Music; Format: CD	4	5	—	BRA: 100,000	ABPD: Gold
Cavaleiro Andante	Released: June 6, 2005; Label: Sony Music; Format: CD, download digital	9	13	—	BRA: 50,000	ABPD: Gold
Sem Crise	Released: 2012; Label: Independent; Format: CD, download digital	—	—	20	BRA: 10,000	

Live Albums

Album Title	Album details	Peak chart positions		Sales	Certifications
Album Title	Album details	BRA	Top 30	Sales	Certifications
MTV ao Vivo	Released: April 8, 2003; Label: Sony Music; Format: CD	3	3	BRA: 100,000	ABPD: Gold

Compilations

Album Title	Album details	Peak chart positions		
Album Title	Album details	BRA	Top 30	POR
Gabriel o Pensador: As Melhores	Released: 1999; Label: Sony Music; Format: CD	1	3	—
Tás a Ver: O Melhor de Gabriel o Pensador	Released: January 20, 2003; Label: Sony Music; Format: CD	12	10	19
Como um Vício	Released: 2008; Label: Sony Music; Format: CD	—	—	—

== Singles ==
List of singles as lead artist, with selected chart positions, showing year released and album name
Year	Title	Peak chart positions				Album
Year	Title	BRA Hot 100	BRA Hit Parade	BRA Year End	POR	Album
1993	"Tô Feliz (Matei o Presidente)"	1	2	40	27	Gabriel o Pensador
1993	"Lavagem Cerebral"	—	—	—	—	Gabriel o Pensador
1995	"Rabo de Saia"	19	11	—	—	Ainda É Só o Começo
1995	"Estudo Errado"	1	1	24	—	Ainda É Só o Começo
1997	"2345meia78"	1	1	17	39	Quebra-Cabeça
1999	"Tô Vazando"	—	—	—	—	Nádegas a Declarar
1999	"Astronauta" (ft. Lulu Santos)	8	12	—	—	Nádegas a Declarar
1999	"Cachorrada"	2	1	12	—	Nádegas a Declarar
2001	"Até Quando?"	1	1	—	—	Seja Você Mesmo (mas não Seja sempre o Mesmo)
2001	"Pega Ladrão!"	12	12	—	—	Seja Você Mesmo (mas não Seja sempre o Mesmo)
2001	"Se Liga Aí"	14	15	—	—	Seja Você Mesmo (mas não Seja sempre o Mesmo)
2003	"Retrato de Um Playboy - Parte II"	11	7	—	—	MTV ao Vivo
2003	"Cara Feia" (ft. Titãs)	23	—	—	—	MTV ao Vivo
2005	"Palavras Repetidas"	18	4	—	—	Cavaleiro Andante
2012	"Surfista Solitário" (ft. Jorge Ben Jor)	17	—	—	13	Sem Crise
2013	"Muito Orgulho, Meu Pai"	—	—	—	—	Sem Crise
2016	"Chega"	—	—	—	—	—N/a
2016	"Fé na Luta"	61	—	—	—	—N/a
2017	"Tô Feliz (Matei o Presidente) 2"	14	—	—	—	—N/a

== Other Songs ==
List of singles as lead artist, with selected chart positions, showing year released and album name
Year	Title	Peak chart positions				Album
Year	Title	BRA Hot 100	BRA Hit Parade	BRA Year End	POR	Album
1993	"Lorâbúrra"	1	1	6	48	Gabriel o Pensador
1993	"175 Nada Especial"	15	12	—	—	Gabriel o Pensador
1997	"Cachimbo da Paz"	1	1	8	—	Quebra-Cabeça
1997	"Dança do Desempregado"	11	8	—	—	Quebra-Cabeça
1997	"Festa da Música"	5	4	100	—	Quebra-Cabeça
1999	"Nádegas a Declarar" (ft. Fernanda Abreu)	7	5	—	—	Nádegas a Declarar
2001	"Tem Alguém Aí?" (ft. Digão)	25	—	—	—	Seja Você Mesmo (Mas Não Seja Sempre o Mesmo)
2003	"Tás a Ver?"	—	—	—	14	Tás a Ver: O Melhor de Gabriel o Pensador
2005	"Tempestade"	68	—	—	—	Cavaleiro Andante
2008	"Amigo Urso – Resposta do Amigo Urso"	70	—	—	—	Como um Vício
