= Lulu Santos =

Brazilian musician and singer (born 1953)

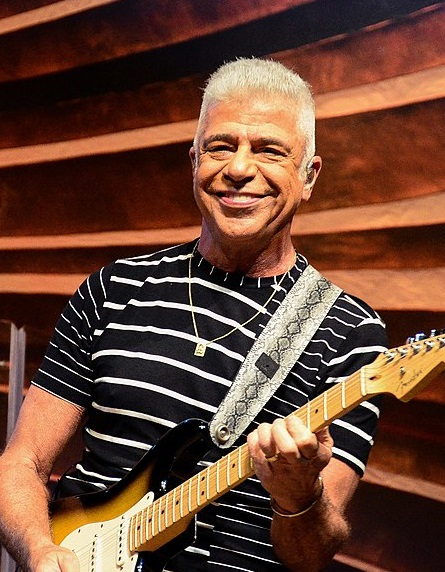
- Lulu Santos in 2018.
- Born: Luiz Maurício Pragana dos Santos; May 4, 1953 (age 73); Rio de Janeiro, Brazil
- Occupations: Singer, guitarist, songwriter, music producer
- Years active: 1973–present
- Spouses: Scarlet Moon de Chevalier (m. 1978; div. 2006) Clebson Teixeira (m. 2018)
- Musical career
- Genres: MPB; Pop; Brazilian rock; Progressive rock; Soul; Funk; Funk rock; Electro rock; Reggae; pop rock; R&B; dance music; blue eyed soul; Disco; Post Disco; Samba rock
- Instruments: Vocals, guitar
- Labels: Warner Music Brasil; Bertelsmann Music Group; Som Livre; Universal Music Group; EMI; Sony Music Brasil
- Formerly of: Vímana

Lulu Santos, stage name of Luiz Maurício Pragana dos Santos (born May 4, 1953), is a Brazilian singer and guitarist.

== Career ==
Lulu was born in Rio de Janeiro. Beginning in the progressive rock band Vímana, he left the band and embarked on a solo career that produced several hits, such as "Tesouros da Juventude" (a tribute to John Lennon, written with Nelson Motta), "De Repente Califórnia", "Tempos modernos", "Adivinha o quê", the smash hit "Como uma Onda (Zen-surfismo)", another Lulu Santos/Nelson Motta partnership and "Um certo alguém". The 1984 album Tudo Azul brought the hits "O último romântico" (whose instrumental arrangement was heavily based on George Harrison's song "Greece", from the 1982 album Gone Troppo), "Certas coisas" and the title track.

In 1986, the album Lulu had "Casa" and "Um pro outro". Lulu sold 250,000 copies. The 1988 album Toda Forma de Amor had the optimistic song "A Cura" (with the lyrics "In every port will fly/the old flag of life/In every lighthouse will burn/a glimmer of hope...Strongly defying the notion/That hell is here/There will be/Every race will experience/The cure for all evils"). "A Cura" was the most played song in FM radio in the year. In March 2017, he announced that he was preparing an album in honor of singer Rita Lee's seventieth birthday, initially titled Um belo dia resolvi mudar, an allusion to an excerpt from the song "Agora Só Falta Você," later changed to Baby Baby!, inspired by an excerpt from the song "Ovelha Negra".

== Discography ==
=== Studio albums ===
- (1982) Tempos Modernos
- (1983) O Ritmo do Momento
- (1984) Tudo Azul
- (1985) Normal
- (1986) Lulu
- (1988) Toda Forma de Amor
- (1989) Popsambalanço e Outras Levadas
- (1990) Honolulu
- (1992) Mondo Cane
- (1994) Assim Caminha a Humanidade
- (1996) Anticiclone Tropical
- (1997) Liga Lá
- (1999) Calendário
- (2002) Programa
- (2003) Bugalu
- (2005) Letra & Música
- (2007) Longplay
- (2009) Singular
- (2013) Lulu Canta & Toca Roberto e Erasmo
- (2014) Luiz Maurício
- (2017) Baby Baby!
- (2019) Pra Sempre

=== Live albums ===
- (1988) Amor à Arte (Lulu Santos & Auxílio Luxuoso)
- (2000) Acústico MTV: Lulu Santos
- (2004) MTV ao Vivo: Lulu Santos
- (2010) Acústico MTV: Lulu Santos II
- (2015) Toca + Lulu (Ao Vivo)

=== Compilation albums ===
- (1995) Eu e Memê, Memê e Eu
- (2012) Toca Lulu (Acústico + Ao Vivo + Pista + Estúdio)

=== Video albums ===
- (1996) Ao Vivo (VHS only)
- (2000) Acústico MTV: Lulu Santos
- (2004) MTV ao Vivo: Lulu Santos
- (2010) Acústico MTV: Lulu Santos II
- (2015) Toca + Lulu (Ao Vivo)

== See also ==
- List of best-selling remix albums
