= Zélia Duncan =

Brazilian singer-songwriter

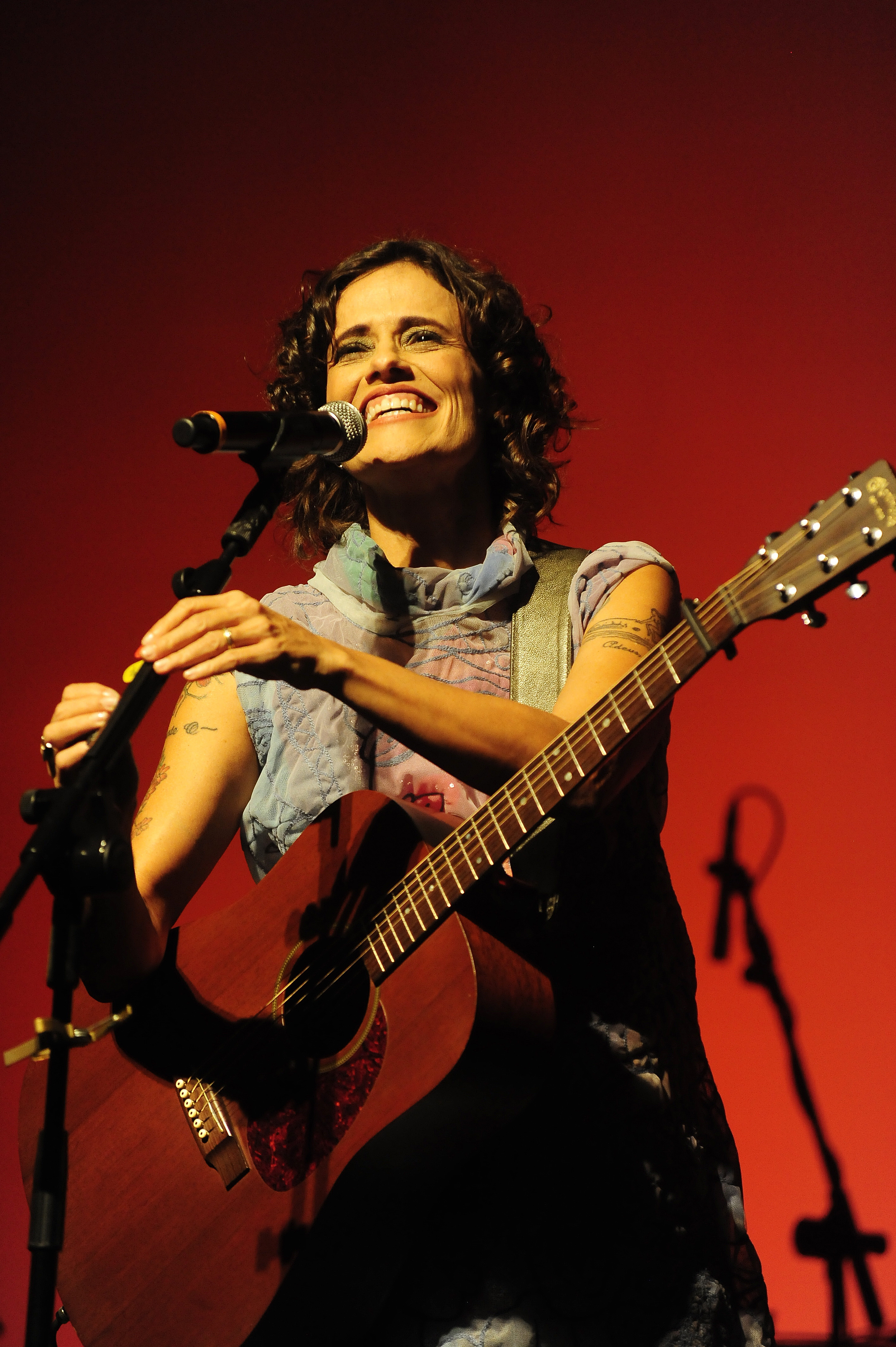
- Duncan in 2011

Background information
- Born: Zélia Cristina Gonçalves Moreira; 28 October 1964 (age 62); Niterói, Rio de Janeiro, Brazil
- Genres: MPB, samba, pop, rock
- Occupations: Singer, songwriter
- Instruments: Vocals, acoustic guitar
- Years active: 1981–present
- Label: Universal
- Formerly of: Os Mutantes
- Website: zeliaduncan.com.br/

Zélia Duncan (Portuguese pronunciation: [ˈzɛliɐ ˈdũkɐ̃], born 28 October 1964), born Zélia Cristina Gonçalves Moreira, is a Brazilian singer-songwriter.

== Biography ==
Duncan was born in Niterói, in the state of Rio de Janeiro. She moved with her family to Brasília, where she lived for 16 years. She started her professional career in 1981 after she won a contest organized by the Fundação Nacional de Artes (National Foundation of Arts). When she was 22 years old, she returned to Rio. Using the name "Zélia Cristina", she first performed as a soloist in Botanic in Rio de Janeiro. In 1990 she launched the LP "Outra Luz" ("Another Light"), and she began performing in cities like São Paulo, Florianópolis, and Porto Alegre and participating in TV shows.

In late 1991, she accepted an offer to go play in the United Arab Emirates. She stayed there for 5 months, returning to Brazil in May 1992. It was in this year that she recorded a track in the songbook of Dorival Caymmi, and she also adopted the name Duncan, the maiden name of her mother. In 1994, she launched her first CD, Zélia Duncan, and two years later she recorded Intimidade (Intimacy), which made her spend a season in Europe and Japan.

In 2006, Duncan was invited and agreed to join the psychedelic rock band Os Mutantes, after the band announced its return to the stage, which caused a rift in her friendship with Rita Lee. Rita, who had been expelled from the band in the 1970s, apparently didn't take kindly to Zélia joining, despite having given her initial approval. The tour was a success and Duncan became a full member of the band. In 2007, however, she decided to leave the band to continue her solo career.

In 2008, she released a CD and DVD of the shows she performed with Simone Bittencourt de Oliveira in 2006 and 2007. The title of the CD and DVD was Amigo é Casa (Friend is the House). Simone and Zélia performed shows in three Portuguese cities—Figueira da Foz, Porto, and Lisbon.

In 2019, her album Tudo É Um was nominated for the Latin Grammy Award for Best MPB Album. Zélia's first performance with public presence during the pandemic of COVID-19, took place on November 28, 2020, at Sala São Paulo, in the São Paulo capital, together with Mart'nália. The performance was part of the series Historical Encounters, with the Jazz Sinfônica Orchestra and had all the care of distancing and other sanitary protocols.

== Discography ==
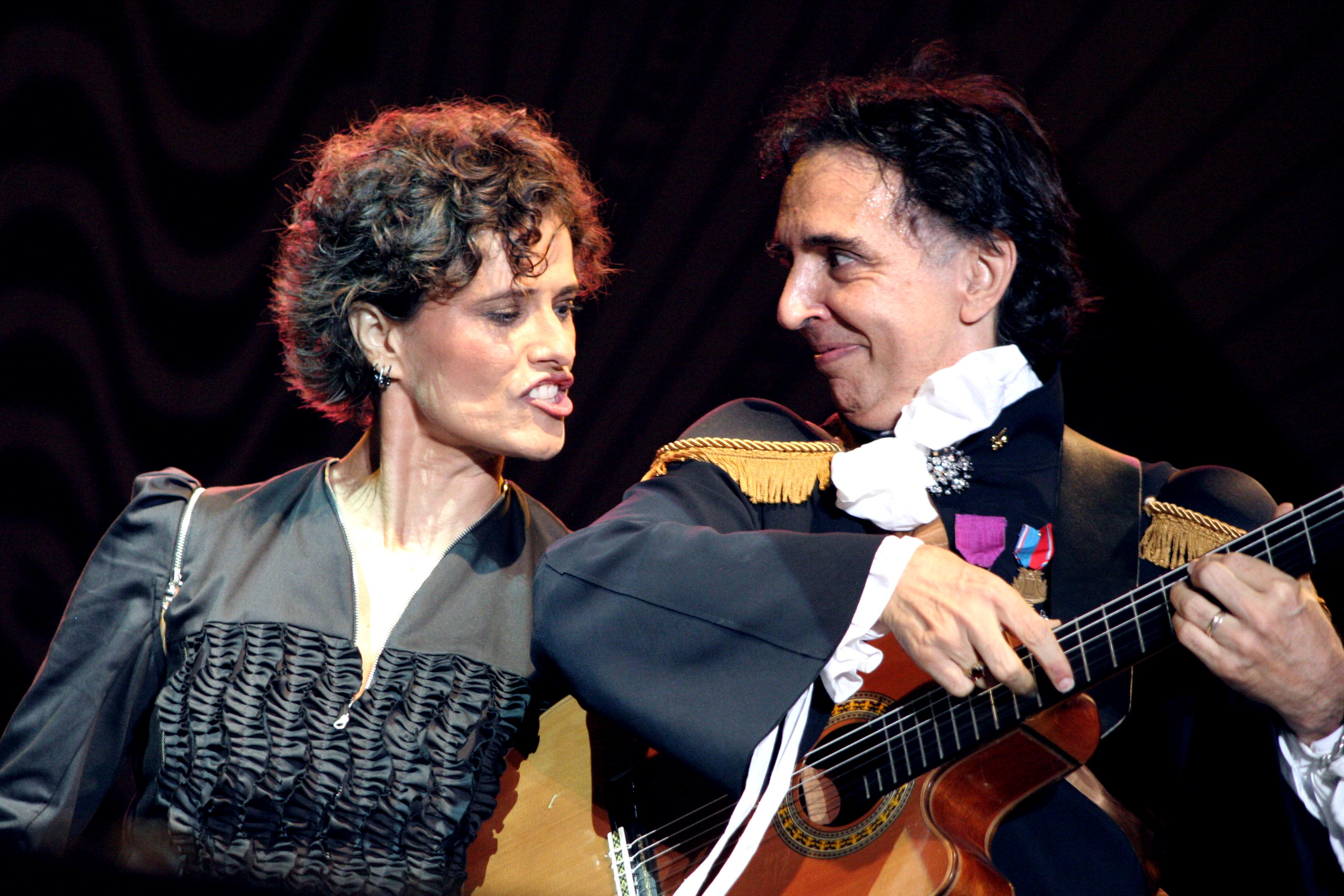
Zélia Duncan and Sérgio Dias of Os Mutantes performing in 2007.

- 1990 – Outra Luz
- 1994 – Zélia Duncan
- 1996 – Intimidade
- 1998 – Acesso
- 2001 – Sortimento
- 2002 – Sortimento Vivo
- 2003 – Avassaladora
- 2004 – Eu me Transformo em Outras
- 2005 – Pré-Pós-Tudo-Bossa-Band
- 2006 – Os Mutantes – Live in Barbican Theatre (with Os Mutantes)
- 2008 – Amigo é casa (live with Simone)
- 2009 – Pelo Sabor do Gesto
- 2012 – Tudo Esclarecido
