= Karnak (band) =

Brazilian band from São Paulo

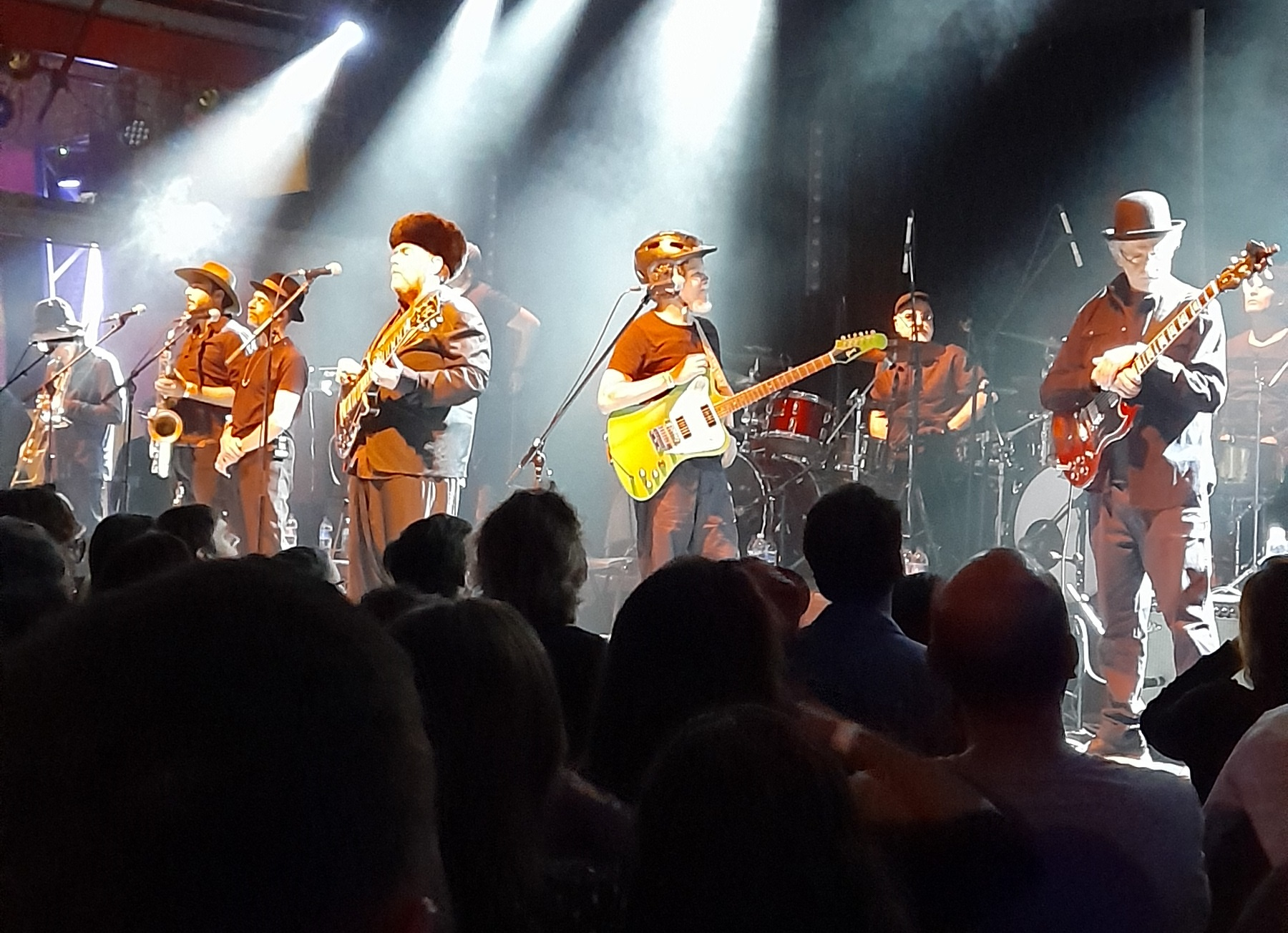
Karnak performing in São Paulo in June 2023.

Karnak is a band from São Paulo, Brazil known for mixing diverse music styles from around the world with pop and rock. Many critics consider Karnak's music style to be world music, although the band rejects this label, claiming that its "ethnic" sound results, not from research, but from their intuition.

== Biography ==
=== Creation ===
In 1991, the lead singer and guitarist, André Abujamra, had ended his musical duo Os Mulheres Negras with Maurício Pereira and went travelling throughout the world with an audio recorder in his hand, collecting every kind of music he could find, with the idea of creating a band that combined these various styles with Brazilian regional music and modern styles like rock, pop and electronic music. One of the destinations of his trip was the ancient tombs of Karnak. He was deeply affected by those tombs and decided to name his band after it.

Upon returning to Brazil, he recruited musicians, mostly from among his friends. He even kept two drummers in the band because both were old friends and he could not dismiss one of them. The project swelled to include ten musicians, two actors and a dog. The band rehearsed for a year before playing a concert, and soon became known for its unusual shows featuring comedy sketches and unusual attire, especially a penchant for odd hats.

=== First album, recognition in Brazil ===
In 1995, Karnak released its first album, Karnak. The album was released by the now defunct Brazilian label Tinitus. After the label's demise, the album was re-released some years after by Net Records. The album was praised by critics but received little airtime on commercial radio. However, Karnak became well-known on university radio stations around São Paulo and it even had some videos played in Brazilian MTV.

=== Second album, international tours ===
The band's second album, Universo Umbigo (Bellybutton Universe), in 1997, was released by Velas, another now-defunct label. The lineup had by this time reached its apex, with fifteen persons, including a belly dancer. In Brazil, the album had less impact that the first one, and to this day it is out of catalog and available only as download at emusic stores under the name of Karnak Universo. Although it did not do well in Brazil, it became popular to some extent on college radio in the United States.

After the release, Karnak toured the United States, Canada and Europe in 1998. The name of the band was changed to "The Karnak", but quickly changed it back. Several members left the band, bringing the total membership down to nine. In the same year, Karnak released a "best of" album in France, called Original. The album included songs from the first two albums, plus a French version of the song "Alma Não Tem Cor" (Souls don't have colors) and a remix of the song "Comendo Uva na Chuva" (Eating grapes in the rain) by André Abujamra.

=== Third album ===
After returning to Brazil the next year, the band started to record its third album, Estamos Adorando Tóquio (We are loving Tokio). With the lineup down to seven members, the album was released in 2000 by Net Records, an independent label that aims to find alternative ways of distributing and selling with lower costs, making the records less tempting to music pirates. The album was sold in newspaper stands at a cheaper price than in record stores.

The band toured internationally again in 2001.

The album was as successful as the first one. Although in the mainstream media its impact was not as great as the 1995 record, the band played more shows, gathered more fans and became a little more known outside São Paulo.

=== Hiatus ===
On 16 December 2002, Abujamra wrote a message to Karnak producer Belma Ikeda which she forwarded to the largest e-mail based discussion list about the band. The content of the message stunned the fans: it explained that the band felt that a cycle was finished, so they were stopping their activities. Their two scheduled shows for the following week would be their last. The concerts were converted into a celebration of the band's existence, and included all Karnak members and ex-members, totaling almost twenty people on stage.

The next year, 2003, a two-disc compilation of "pirate" live recordings was officially released, under the name Os Piratas do Karnak (The pirates of Karnak).

=== Resuming activities ===
Although Abujamra confirmed that Karnak was finished, it has performed at least once a year since 2003, usually in SESC Pompéia, a culture complex located in São Paulo. In one of these seasonal performances, in 2006, Abujamra announced that the band was resuming its activities. He attributed their pause, humorously or not, to his uncertainty on whether or not he would survive gastric bypass surgery. He promised that the band would record a new album with new original songs.

Karnak could then be seen playing concerts in the city of São Paulo and sometimes in other nearby cities. The lineup frequently changed from one gig to another, save from Abujamra, Hori, Bowie, Stolarski and Cabello, who at that point were considered "the golden members".

=== Karnak's Multicolored Book ===
At the end of 2006 the mockumentary The Karnak's Multicolored Book was released. The film narrates a fictitious behind-the-scenes record a 2004 secret Chinese tour, but in fact it documents the bands supposed "final gig" in 2002. It was premiered in the 30th annual São Paulo International Film Festival, and is available for download on orkut.

=== Rock opera ===
In December 2019, Karnak released the single "O Mundo Está de Ponta Cabeça" in streaming platforms, announcing at the same time a full album called "Nikodemus". It was Karnak's first "rock opera", telling the story of a fictional king and his evil rival, who wants to steal his creations. The band settled on a line-up that included the return of old bandmates such as Carneiro Sândalo, Tiquinho, and Luiz Macedo, and fresh faces such as Marcelo "Pomps" Pereira and Eron Guarnieri.

== Discography ==
=== Albums ===
- Karnak – 1995
- Universo Umbigo – 1997
- Estamos Adorando Tóquio – 2000
- Nikodemus - 2020
- Karnak Mesozóico - 2025

=== Compilations ===
- Original – 1999
- Os Piratas do Karnak (live recordings) – 2003

== Lineup ==
=== Current members ===
- André Abujamra – vocals, electric guitar (1992-)
- Marcos Bowie – trumpet, vocals (1992-)
- Kuki Stolarski – drums (1992-)
- Marcelo "Pomps" Pereira – saxophone (2017 onwards)
- Mano Bap – bass guitar, electric guitar (1996–2002, 2010s onwards)
- Eron Guarnieri – keyboards and samplers (2017 onwards)
- Luiz Macedo – electric guitar (1992–1996, 2019 onwards)
- Sérgio Bártolo – bass guitar (1992-2001, 2010s onwards)
- Carneiro Sândalo – drums (1992–1999, 2019 onwards)
- Tiquinho – trombone (1997–1999, 2019 onwards)
- James Müller – percussion (1992/1999, 2025 onwards)

=== Other members ===
- Eduardo Cabello – electric guitar (1992 until his death in 2024)
- Hugo Hori – saxophone, vocals (1995–2017)
- Juliano Beccari – keyboards and samplers (2001 until one point in the 2010s)
- Lulu Camargo – keyboards and samplers (1992–2001)
- Paulo Gregori – performances (1992–1996)
- Jeton – Sândalo's dog (1992–1999)
- Lloyd Bonnemaison – saxophone (1997–1999)
- Zuzu – belly dancer (1997–1999)

== Solo and parallel careers ==
- André Abujamra: has a solo career since 2004 and has released many albums.
- Lulu Camargo: was the keyboardist of the Brazilian band Pato Fu from 2005 to 2016.
- Hugo Hori, Kuki Stolarski, Juliano Beccari, Sérgio Bártolo, James Müller: currently members of the Brazilian band Funk Como Le Gusta.
- Kuki Stolarski is also member of the Brazilian band Bojo. The band once had Lulu Camargo in its lineup.
- Mano Bap, Hugo Hori and Juliano Beccari are also members of the Brazilian band The Central Scrutinizer Band, along with Marcos Bowie.
