= Cidade Negra =

Brazilian reggae band

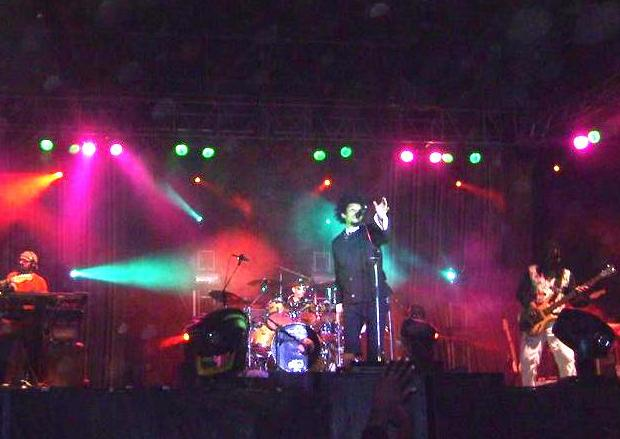

Background information
- Origin: Belford Roxo, Brazil
- Genres: Reggae, soul
- Years active: 1986 - present
- Labels: Sony BMG, EMI, Som Livre
- Members: Toni Garrido; Bino Farias
- Past members: Ras Bernardo; Alexandre Massau; Da Gama; Lazão

Cidade Negra (Portuguese: Black City) is a Brazilian reggae band formed in 1986 in Belford Roxo. Their style is influenced by soul and rock music. Common themes of Cidade Negra songs include love and social issues.

== History ==
The band reached success in 1991, with the album Lute pra Viver (Fight to Live), including the radio hit "Falar a Verdade". Ras Bernardo was the first vocalist.

Toni Garrido at the time was the vocalist of Banda Bel. He entered in Cidade Negra after their second album, in 1993.

Formed in Baixada Fluminense, the band has placed hits in soap operas, like the frustrated remake of Irmãos Coragem, broadcast in Rede Globo in 1995.

In 2002, Cidade Negra recorded their first acoustic record, on MTV Brasil. Acústico MTV: Cidade Negra contained another radio hit, "Girassol". In this year, Garrido was presenter of two editions of Globo-Endemol's reality show Fama with Angélica.

In 2005, the group was nominated for Brazilian VMAs (VMB), for best video by viewers choice (Perto de Deus). They lost it to CPM 22's "Um Minuto para o Fim do Mundo". In 2006, celebrating twenty years of career, the group released the DVD Direto.

In 2007 Sony BMG did not renew their contract with the band, who soon found EMI Music to launch its newest project then the CD and DVD: Diversão, recorded at the Teatro Popular - Niterói, on August 16, 2007, released by the band. In April 2008, Toni Garrido announced his exit from the Cidade Negra, after fourteen years on the road.

In June 2008, Garrido undertook his last concert in the Festa Estadual do Leite Presidente Getúlio, Santa Catarina, on May 31. On June 13, Cidade Negra announced the new singer: Alexandre Massau, from Belo Horizonte, Minas Gerais, ex-singer of Berimbrown and Preto Massa. On July 29, the group made its debut in the Festival de Inverno of Santos Dumont/MG.

Toni Garrido returned to the band on 24 January 2011.

== Members ==
- Toni Garrido - lead singer
- Lazão - drums
- Bino Farias - bass
- Sérgio Yazbek - guitar
- Alex Meireles - keyboard

== Discography ==
=== Studio albums ===
- (1990) Lute pra Viver
- (1992) Negro no Poder
- (1994) Sobre Todas as Forças
- (1996) O Erê
- (1998) Quanto Mais Curtido Melhor
- (1999) Hits & Dubs
- (2000) Enquanto o Mundo Gira
- (2004) Perto de Deus
- (2010) Que Assim Seja
- (2012) Hei, Afro!

=== Live albums ===
- (2002) Acústico MTV: Cidade Negra
- (2006) Direto
- (2007) Diversão
