= Ivete Sangalo discography =

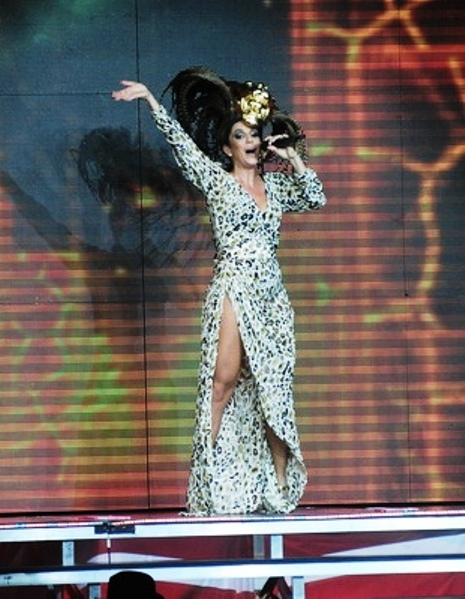
- Studio albums: 8
- Live albums: 3
- Compilation albums: 7
- Video albums: 5
- Special editions: 1

The albums discography of Brazilian singer-songwriter Ivete Sangalo consists of seven studio albums, three live albums, seven compilation albums, one extended play and five video albums. In 1993, Sangalo began her career as lead singer of Banda Eva, the most successful Brazilian axé music band, and released six studio albums, one live album and two compilation albums.

In 1999 Sangalo began her solo career and release her self-titled album, with the smash hits "Se Eu Não Te Amasse Tanto Assim" and, "Canibal". Her second album, Beat Beleza, was released in September 2000 featuring the singles "Pererê" and "A Lua Que Eu Te Dei". In 2002 Sangalo released her most successful single, "Festa" from the same title album, Festa, and in 2003 was released Clube Carnavalesco Inocentes em Progresso, her least successful album. Her first live album, MTV Ao Vivo - Ivete Sangalo, was released in 2004 for the 10-year career commemorates at the Octavio Mangabeira Stadium, receiving more than 80.000 people featuring Gilberto Gil, the duo Sandy & Junior and the axé music singers Daniela Mercury and Margareth Menezes. The work sold around 1 million copies. In 2005 was released the five studio album As Super Novas featuring the smash hits "A Galera", "Abalou", "Quando a Chuva Passar" "Chorando Se Foi", the Kaoma's cover version.

In 2007 released their second live album, Multishow ao Vivo: Ivete no Maracanã, sold 700.000 copies and three Latin Grammy Award nominations in the categories Best Brazilian Song by "Berimbau Metalizado", Best Brazilian Contemporary Pop Music and Best Long Form Music Video. In 2008 Sangalo released the Children's music album Veveta e Saulinho - A Casa Amarela with the Brazilian axé music singer Saulo Fernandes, and in 2009 she released her seven studio album and three DVD Pode Entrar: Multishow Registro featuring the hits "Cadê Dalila", "Agora Eu Já Sei" and "Na Base do Beijo". In 2011 it is the turn of the singer's new show is released, Ivete Sangalo at Multishow ao Vivo: Ivete Sangalo no Madison Square Garden, recorded in New York City featuring Nelly Furtado, Juanes, Diego Torres and Seu Jorge.

Sangalo sold 17 million copies, making it one of the biggest record sales of Brazilian music industry. She's the artist with the greatest number of DVDs sold worldwide

== Albums ==
=== Studio albums ===
Title	Album details	Peak chart positions	Sales	Certifications
Title	Album details	POR	Sales	Certifications
Ivete Sangalo	Released: July 30, 1999; Label: Universal Music; Formats: CD, digital download	—	BRA: 80.000	BRA: Platinum
Beat Beleza	Released: September 10, 2000; Label: Universal Music; Formats: CD, digital download	—	BRA: 40.000	BRA: Gold
Festa	Released: February 20, 2002; Label: Universal Music; Formats: CD, digital download	—	BRA: 80.000	BRA: Platinum
Clube Carnavalesco Inocentes em Progresso	Released: September 3, 2003; Label: Universal Music; Formats: CD, digital download	—	BRA: 40.000	BRA: Gold
As Super Novas	Released: August 5, 2005; Label: Universal Music; Formats: CD, digital download	20	BRA: 300.000	BRA: Diamond
Veveta e Saulinho - A Casa Amarela with Saulo Fernandes	Released: October 17, 2008; Label: Universal Music; Formats: CD, digital download	—	BRA: 40.000	BRA: Gold
Pode Entrar: Multishow Registro	Released: June 6, 2009; Label: Universal Music; Formats: CD, digital download	4	BRA: 40.000	BRA: Gold
Real Fantasia	Released: October 9, 2012; Label: Universal Music; Formats: CD, digital download	7	BRA: 40.000	BRA: Gold

=== Live albums ===
Title	Album details	Peak chart positions	Sales	Certifications
Title	Album details	POR	Sales	Certifications
MTV Ao Vivo - Ivete Sangalo	Released: February 29, 2004; Label: Universal Music; Formats: CD, digital download	6	BRA: 300.000	BRA: Diamond
Multishow ao Vivo: Ivete no Maracanã	Released: April 2, 2007; Label: Universal Music; Formats: CD, digital download	10	BRA: 240.000	BRA: 3× Platinum
Ivete Sangalo Ao Vivo no Madison Square Garden	Released: December 7, 2010; Label: Universal Music; Formats: CD, digital download	9	BRA: 40.000	BRA: Gold

=== Compilation albums ===
Title	Album details	Peak chart positions	Sales	Certifications
Title	Album details	POR	Sales	Certifications
Se Eu Não Te Amasse Tanto Assim	Released: November 14, 2002; Label: Universal Music; Formats: CD, digital download	25	BRA: 40.000	BRA: Gold
A Arte de Ivete Sangalo	Released: August 22, 2005; Label: Universal Music; Formats: CD, digital download	—		
Novo Millennium	Released: November 20, 2005; Label: Universal Music; Formats: CD, digital download	7		
O melhor de Ivete Sangalo	Released: September 3, 2006; Label: Universal Music; Formats: CD, digital download	—		
Perfil	Released: September 17, 2008; Label: Universal Music; Formats: CD, digital download	3	BRA: 80.000	BRA: Platinum; POR: Gold
Sem Limite	Released: December 5, 2008; Label: Universal Music; Formats: CD, digital download	—		
Duetos	Released: May 5, 2009; Label: Universal Music; Formats: CD, digital download	3	BRA: 40.000	BRA: Gold

=== Special albums ===
Title	Album details	Peak chart positions
Title	Album details	NL
Ivete Sangalo	Released: June 16, 2006; Label: Universal Music; Formats: CD, digital download	38

== Singles ==
List of singles showing year released and album name
Title	Year	Certifications	Album
"Canibal"	1999		Ivete Sangalo
"Se Eu não Te Amasse tanto Assim"	1999	Pro-Música Brasil: Gold	Ivete Sangalo
"Tá Tudo Bem"	1999		Ivete Sangalo
"Tô Na Rua"	2000		Ivete Sangalo
"Pererê"	2000		Beat Beleza
"A Lua Que Eu Te Dei"	2000		Beat Beleza
"Bug, Bug, Bye, Bye"	2001		Beat Beleza
"Empurra, Empurra"	2001		Beat Beleza
"Festa"	2002	Pro-Música Brasil: Diamond (Download); Pro-Música Brasil: Gold (Streaming)	Festa
"Back at One" (featuring Brian McKnight)	2002		Festa
"Penso"	2002		Festa
"Astral"	2003		Festa
"Sorte Grande"	2003	Pro-Música Brasil: Platinum	Clube Carnavalesco Inocentes em Progresso
"Somente Eu e Você"	2003		Clube Carnavalesco Inocentes em Progresso
"Você e Eu, Eu e Você"	2003		Clube Carnavalesco Inocentes em Progresso
"Flor do Reggae"	2004	Pro-Música Brasil: Platinum	MTV Ao Vivo - Ivete Sangalo
"Céu da Boca" (featuring Gilberto Gil)	2004	Pro-Música Brasil: Platinum	MTV Ao Vivo - Ivete Sangalo
"Faz Tempo"	2004		MTV Ao Vivo - Ivete Sangalo
"Só Pra me Ver"	2005		MTV Ao Vivo - Ivete Sangalo
"Soy Loco Por Ti América"	2005		As Super Novas
"Abalou"	2005	Pro-Música Brasil: Platinum	As Super Novas
"A Galera"	2006		As Super Novas
"Chorando Se Foi"	2006		As Super Novas
"Quando a Chuva Passar"	2006	Pro-Música Brasil: Platinum	As Super Novas
"Berimbau Metalizado"	2006	Pro-Música Brasil: Diamond	Multishow ao Vivo: Ivete no Maracanã
"Completo"	2007	Pro-Música Brasil: Platinum	Multishow ao Vivo: Ivete no Maracanã
"Deixo"	2007	Pro-Música Brasil: Gold (Download); Pro-Música Brasil: Gold (Streaming)	Multishow ao Vivo: Ivete no Maracanã
"Não Precisa Mudar" (featuring Saulo Fernandes)	2007	Pro-Música Brasil: Diamond	Multishow ao Vivo: Ivete no Maracanã
"Ilumina"	2007		Multishow ao Vivo: Ivete no Maracanã
"Não Me Faça Esperar"	2008		nom-album single
"Não Quero Dinheiro (Só Quero Amar)"	2008	Pro-Música Brasil: Platinum	Multishow ao vivo: Ivete no Maracanã
"País Tropical"	2008		Multishow ao vivo: Ivete no Maracanã
"Cadê Dalila"	2009		Pode Entrar: Multishow Registro
"Agora Eu Já Sei"	2009		Pode Entrar: Multishow Registro
"Quanto Ao Tempo" (featuring Carlinhos Brown)	2009		Pode Entrar: Multishow Registro
"Na Base do Beijo"	2009		Pode Entrar: Multishow Registro
"Lobo Mau (Vou te Comer)"	2010		nom-album single
"Meu Segredo"	2010		Pode Entrar: Multishow Registro
"Acelera Aê (Noite do Bem)"	2010		Ivete Sangalo no Madison Square Garden
"Desejo de Amar"	2011	Pro-Música Brasil: Gold	Ivete Sangalo no Madison Square Garden
"Pensando em Nós Dois" (featuring Seu Jorge)	2011		Ivete Sangalo no Madison Square Garden
"Eu nunca amei alguém como eu te amei"	2011		nom-album single
"Qui Belê"	2011		Ivete Sangalo no Madison Square Garden
"Pra falar de você"	2012		Ivete Sangalo no Madison Square Garden
"Darte" (featuring Juanes)	2012		Ivete Sangalo no Madison Square Garden
"Dançando"	2013		nom-album single
"Tempo de Alegria"	2013		IS20
"Pra Frente"	2014		IS20
"Só Num Sonho"	2015		IS20
"Zero a Dez"	2016		IS20
"À Vontade"	2017	Pro-Música Brasil: Gold	Duetos 2
"Um Sinal"	2018	Pro-Música Brasil: 3× Platinum	nom-album single
"Mainha Gosta Assim"	2021	Pro-Música Brasil: Gold	Live Experience
"O Mundo Vai"	2020	Pro-Música Brasil: Platinum	O Mundo Vai
"Tá Solteira, Mas Não Tá Sozinha"	2021	Pro-Música Brasil: Platinum	nom-album single
"Macetando"	2023	Pro-Música Brasil: Diamond	ReIvete-Se

=== As featured artist ===
Title	Year	Album
"El Último Adiós (The Last Goodbye)" (with Artists for 9/11 attacks musicians)	2001	Charity single
"Band Vida" (with Artists for Life)	2004	Charity single
"Não Me Conte Seus Problemas" (Banda Eva featuring Ivete Sangalo)	2005	Banda Eva 25 Anos Ao Vivo
"Se Eu Não Te Amasse Tanto Assim" (Roberto Carlos featuring Ivete Sangalo)	2005	Roberto Carlos - Duetos
"Amor Que Fica" (Zezé di Camargo & Luciano featuring Ivete Sangalo)	2007	Diferente
"Além Mar" (Asa de Águia featuring Ivete Sangalo)	2008	Asa de Águia 20 Anos
"Estrela Cadente" (Alexandre Pires featuring Ivete Sangalo)	2008	Em Casa
"E Agora Nós?" (Sorriso Maroto featuring Ivete Sangalo)	2009	Sinais
"Flor do Reggae" (Maisa featuring Ivete Sangalo)	2010	Tudo Que Me Vem Na Cabeça
"Química do Amor" (Luan Santana featuring Ivete Sangalo)	2011	Luan Santana Live in Rio
"Carinho de Verdade" (with Artists Against Child Sexual Violence)	2011	Charity single

=== Promotional singles ===
Title	Year	Album
"Narizinho"^{[A]}	2001	Festa
"Corazón Partío" (featuring Alejandro Sanz)	2008	Multishow ao Vivo: Ivete no Maracanã
"Dengo de Amor"	2008	Multishow ao Vivo: Ivete no Maracanã
"Bicho"^{[A]}	2008	Veveta e Saulinho - A Casa Amarela
"Funk do Xixi"^{[A]}	2008	Veveta e Saulinho - A Casa Amarela
"A Casa Amarela"^{[A]}	2009	Veveta e Saulinho - A Casa Amarela

Notes

- A Radio Kids-exclusive single.

== Other appearances ==
Ano	Song	Artist	Album
1998	"Seu Zé"	Daniela Mercury & Marisa Orth	Brasil São Outros 500
1998	"Vai Brasil"	Zeca Pagodinho, Carla Visi, Netinho	
1998	"Cartão De Natal 98"	Jota Quest, Pato Fu, Fat Family	14 Hits Da Pan
1999	"A Girafa"	Ivete Sangalo	A Arca Dos Bichos
1999	"A Arca"	Sandy, Zeca Baleiro, Paulo Ricardo, Claudinho & Buchech, Carla Visi, Netinho, Beto Jamaica, Gil	A Arca Dos Bichos
1999	"Frisson"	Ketama	Toma Ketama!
2000	"Amar Quem Já Amei"	Zé Ramalho	Nação Nordestina
2000	"Rosa"	Olodum	A Música do Olodum - 20 Anos
2001	"Fullgás"	Ivete Sangalo	Um Barzinho, Um Violão - Ao Vivo
2001	"O Sal da Terra"	Roupa Nova	Ouro de Minas
2001	"Cai Dentro"	Margareth Menezes & Daniela Mercury	Afropopbrasileiro
2002	"Me Liga"	Ivete Sangalo	Um Barzinho, Um Violão - Ao Vivo 2
2002	"Festa"	Ivete Sangalo	Samba Gol - Ronaldinho 10
2002	"Minha Nossa Senhora"	José Maurício Machline	Mania de Vocês
2002	"Avisa a Vizinha (Vixe Maria)"	Araketu	Ensaio do Araketu
2002	"Trem das Onze"	Demônios da Garoa	Casa De Samba - Ao Vivo
2003	"Back at One"	Brian McKnight	Café Da Ponte
2003	"Pererê"	Ivete Sangalo	Cafe - Коктейль Vol. 1
2003	"Por Causa de Você Menina"	Jorge Ben Jor	A Música de Jorge Ben Jor
2004	"I'm Still In Love With You"	Davi Moraes	Orixá Mutante
2005	"Toque de Timbaleiro"	Timbalada	Novo Millennium - Timbalada
2005	"Papa Papet"	Timbalada	Novo Millennium - Timbalada
2005	"Como Tu"	Margareth Menezes	Pra Você
2005	"Manda Ver / Flores (Sonho Épico)"	Banda Eva	Banda Eva 25 Anos Ao Vivo
2005	"Eva"	Banda Eva, Emanuelle Araújo, Durval Lelys, Luiz Caldas, Ricardo Chaves e Marcionílio	Banda Eva 25 Anos Ao Vivo
2005	"Ajayô"	Luiz Caldas	Ao Vivo em Salvador
2005	"Festa"	Xuxa	Xuxa só para Baixinhos 6 - Festa
2005	"Pintou Harmonia"	Harmonia do Samba	Ao Vivo em Salvador
2006	"Se Eu Não Te Amasse Tanto Assim"	Roberto Carlos	Roberto Carlos: Duetos
2006	"Onde Você se Esconde"	Netinho	Porinteiro Ao Vivo
2006	"Tempos Modernos"	Netinho	Porinteiro Ao Vivo
2006	"Coisas Maravilhosas"	Xuxa	Xuxa Gêmeas
2006	"Beijinho Doce"	Chitãozinho & Xororó e Margareth Menezes	Estação Globo
2007	"Brasil Pandeiro"	Beth Carvalho	Beth Carvalho Canta o Samba da Bahia
2007	"Simples Carinho"	Hebe Camargo	As Mais Gostosas da Hebe
2007	"Céu da Boca"	Gilberto Gil	Duetos
2007	"Namoro"	Ricardo Chaves	Ao Vivo em Salvador
2007	"Amor de Carnaval"	Ricardo Chaves	Ao Vivo em Salvador
2007	"Olvídame Tú"	Miguel Bosé	Papito
2007	"Fácil"	Jota Quest	Raridades
2007	"O Vento"	Jota Quest	Raridades
2007	"Gostava Tanto De Você / Você / Azul Da Cor Do Mar"	Jota Quest	Raridades
2007	"Enrosca"	Sandy & Junior	Acústico MTV
2007	"Não Tenho Lágrimas"	Juan Luis Guerra	Cidade do Samba
2008	"Farraué"	Asa de Águia	Asa de Águia 20 Anos
2008	"Favo de Mel"	Trêm de Pouso	Trêm de Pouso ao Vivo
2008	"Biquini de Bolinha Amarelinha"	Blitz	BLITZ - Ao Vivo e a Cores
2008	"Cristo Amigo"	Padre Marcelo Rossi	Paz Sim, Violência Não - Vol.1
2008	"Quadrilha"	Francis Hime	Musical 2
2009	"Loucuras de uma Paixão"	Jorge Aragão	Duetos
2009	"Os Seus Botões"	Ivete Sangalo	Roberto Carlos Especial
2009	"Além do Horizonte"	Ivete Sangalo	Roberto Carlos Especial
2009	"Olha"	Ivete Sangalo	Elas Cantam Roberto Carlos
2009	"Como É Grande O Meu Amor Por Você"	Roberto Carlos	Elas Cantam Roberto Carlos
2009	"Romaria"	Renato Teixeira	Em Salvador
2009	"Natal Todo Dia"	Xuxa	Xuxa só para Baixinhos 9 - Natal Mágico
2009	"Então É Natal"	Xuxa	Xuxa só para Baixinhos 9 - Natal Mágico
2009	"Gotas de Ti"	Sergio Vallín	Bendito Entre Las Mujeres
2009	"The Girl from Ipanema"	B. J. Thomas	Once I Loved
2010	"E Agora Nós?"	Sorriso Maroto	Sinais: Ao Vivo
2010	"Vamos Fazer O que Ainda Não Foi Feito"	Pedro Abrunhosa	Globos de Ouro Portutal
2010	"Hey!"	Mango Groove	Bang The Drum
2010	"Parente do Avião"	Carlinhos Brown, Daniela Mercury, Armandinho, Margareth Menezes, Luiz Caldas, Claudia Leitte	Sarau do Brown
2010	"Leva"	Michael Sullivan	Duetos
2010	"Brega de Leila"	Zéu Britto	Saliva-me Ao Vivo
2010	"Te Quero Delícia"	Psirico	Psirico Ao Vivo
2011	"Não Estou Sozinho"	Banda Dominus e Fábio de Melo	Banda Dominus
2011	"Chover Canivete"	Aviões do Forró	Aviões do Forró Ao Vivo
2011	"Chevete de Menina"	Genival Lacerda	Genival & Convidados
2011	"O Ciúme"	Geraldo Azevedo	Salve São Francisco
2011	"Nenhum de Nós"	Tomate	Atitude
2011	"Chove Chuva (Rain Rains)"	Sérgio Mendes	Celebration 50 anos
2011	"Diana"	Toninho Horta	Harmonia & Vozes
2011	"Se Eu Não Te Amasse Tanto Assim"	Gigi D'Alessio	Radio Music City Hall
2011	"O Circo Pega Fogo"	Luiza Possi	Seguir Cantando
2011	"Azul"	Luiza Possi	Seguir Cantando
N/D	"TBA"	Anahí	TBA
N/D	"TBA"	Nelly Furtado	Lifestyle

== Soundtrack appearances ==
Ano	Canção	Álbum
1999	"Frisson"	Suave Veneno
2000	"Se Eu não Te Amasse tanto Assim"	Uga-Uga
2001	"A Lua Que Eu Te Dei"	Porto dos Milagres
2001	"Narizinho"	Sítio do Picapau Amarelo
2003	"Somente Eu e Você"	Kubanacan
2005	"Soy Loco Por Ti América"	América
2006	"Quando a Chuva Passar"	Cobras e Lagartos
2007	"Amor que Fica"	Amazônia, de Galvez a Chico Mendes
2007	"Deixo"	Sete Pecados
2010	"Teus Olhos" (feat. Marcelo Camelo)	Ti Ti Ti
2011	"Olha"	Morde & Assopra
2011	"Take You To Rio (Eu Vou Te Levar Pro Rio)"	Rio

== Video albums ==
Title	Album details	Sales	Certifications
MTV Ao Vivo - Ivete Sangalo	Released: February 29, 2004; Label: Universal Music; Formats: DVD	BRA: 500.000	BRA: 5× Diamond
Multishow ao Vivo: Ivete no Maracanã	Released: April 2, 2007; Label: Universal Music; Formats: DVD	BRA: 600.000	BRA: 2× Diamond
Pode Entrar: Multishow Registro	Released: June 6, 2009; Label: Universal Music; Formats: DVD	BRA: 200.000	BRA: 3× Platinum
Duetos	Released: May 5, 2009; Label: Universal Music; Formats: DVD	BRA: 50.000	BRA: Gold
Ivete Sangalo Ao Vivo no Madison Square Garden	Released: December 7, 2010; Label: Universal Music; Formats: DVD	BRA: 375.000	BRA: Diamond
