= Ivete Sangalo (album) =

Studio album by Ivete Sangalo
- Released: October 11, 1999
- Recorded: 1999
- Genres: Axé; MPB; pop
- Length: 52:01
- Labels: Mercury Records; Universal Music
- Producer: Marco Mazzola

Ivete Sangalo chronology
Ivete Sangalo (1999)	Beat Beleza (2000)

Singles from Ivete Sangalo
- 1. "Tá Tudo Bem" Released: July 7, 1999; 2. "Canibal" Released: November 12, 1999; 3. "Se Eu Não Te Amasse Tanto Assim" Released: May 2, 2000; 4. "Tô Na Rua" Released: September 1, 2000

Ivete Sangalo is the first solo album of Brazilian singer Ivete Sangalo, released in 1999.

On the disc, Ivete, fresh out of Banda Eva, invested in various rhythms: Maracatu, Reggae, Forro and romantic music are present on the album, besides, of course, the Axe Music. The first singles from the album were "Canibal" and "Tá Tudo Bem", performed at concerts prior to burning the CD.

The album became a bestseller especially in 2000, when the romantic song "Se Eu Não Te Amasse Tanto Assim", composed by Herbert Vianna and Paulo Sérgio Valle, was included in the soundtrack of the telenovela Uga Uga, Rede Globo, making the most played song 2000.

Also noteworthy are the tracks "100 o seu Amor" (rewriting Luiz Caldas and Carlinhos Brown), "Medo de Amar" (featuring Ed Motta and arrangements musician César Camargo Mariano), "Tenho Dito" (John composition Anja Bosco and Blanc), "Sá Marina" (success of Antonio Adolfo Gaspar and Tiberius) and "Bota Pra Ferver" (remake the banda Asa de Águia).

== Critical reception ==
In general, the album received positive reviews.

In criticism of Allmusic, for example, the songs "Canibal", "100 o seu Amor", "Eternamente" and "Sá Marina" were taken as the best album.

== Track listing ==
No.	Title	Writer(s)	Length
1.	"Canibal"	Ivete Sangalo	3:46
2.	"Tá Tudo Bem"	Alexandre Peixe	3:49
3.	"100 o Seu Amor"	Carlinhos Brown, Luiz Caldas	3:17
4.	"Música Para Pular Brasileira"	Davi Salles	3:23
5.	"Monsieur Samba"	Gal Sales, Jamoliva	3:48
6.	"Medo de Amar" (featuring Ed Motta)	Ivete Sangalo	4:58
7.	"Eternamente"	Davi Salles	3:59
8.	"Tô Na Rua"	Gal Sales, Xexéu II	3:41
9.	"Chuva de Flor"	Marquinho Carvalho	3:18
10.	"Tenho Dito"	João Bosco	3:42
11.	"Destino"	Gal Sales, Jamoliva	4:13
12.	"Sá Marina"	Gal Sales, Jamoliva	4:22
13.	"Se Eu Não Te Amasse Tanto Assim"	Herbert Vianna, Paulo Sérgio Valle	4:09
14.	"Bota Pra Ferver"	Durval Lelys	4:16

== Certifications ==
Country	Certification	Sales/shipments
Brazil (ABPD)	Platinum	400.000
