= 2016 Summer Paralympics closing ceremony =

- Part of 2016 Summer Paralympics
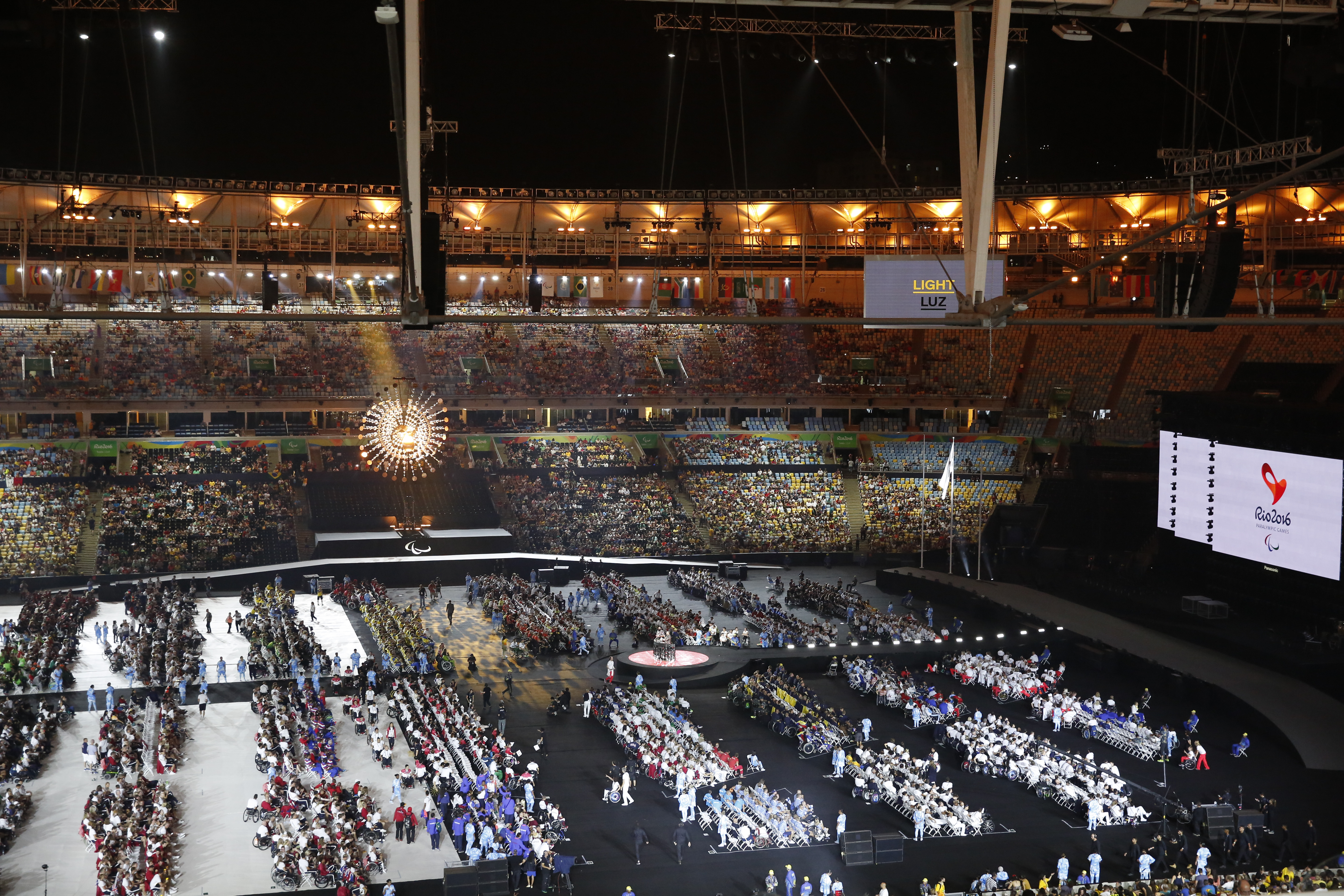
- Date: 18 September 2016
- Venue: Maracanã Stadium
- Location: Rio de Janeiro, Brazil
- Filmed by: Olympic Broadcasting Services (OBS)
- Footage: The ceremony on the IPC YouTube channel on YouTube

The closing ceremony of the 2016 Summer Paralympics was held at the Maracanã Stadium in Rio de Janeiro, Brazil on 18 September 2016.

The ceremony's cultural portions were structured as a concert featuring a number of mainstream Brazilian singers and bands, headlined by pop divas Ivete Sangalo and Gaby Amarantos. As per Paralympic protocol, the ceremony featured the official closing of the Games, including closing remarks by International Paralympic Committee president Philip Craven and the leader of the Games' organizing committee, Carlos Arthur Nuzman, the handover of the Paralympic flag from Rio de Janeiro mayor Eduardo Paes to Yuriko Koike, governor of Tokyo—host of the 2020 Summer Paralympics, a cultural presentation by the next host city, and the extinguishing of the Paralympic flame and marked an end for this edition of the games.

== Synopsis ==
=== Welcome ===
Athletes were already seated in the stadium prior to the start of the ceremony. The opening segments featured deaf drummers guided by a "visual metronome" led by the singer Gaby Amarantos, a performance by Andreas Kisser set to a sequence featuring acrobats in wheelchairs, and a performance by Jonathan Bastos—who was born armless and plays guitar with his feet. Following the playing of the national anthem by Saulo Laucas, a singer who was born blind and was diagnosed with a mild form of autism as a child, flagbearers representing the countries that participated in these Paralympics entered the stadium.

=== Party with every sense ===
The cultural program of the closing ceremony was structured as a concert, being headlined by Brazilian pop divas Ivete Sangalo and Gaby Amarantos, joined by Vanessa da Mata, Céu, Saulo Fernandes, Sepultura guitarist Andreas Kisser, Armandinho, Johnathan Bastos, the groups Nação Zumbi and Dream Team do Passinho, the pop singer Nego do Borel, and British singer Calum Scott (who collaborated with Ivete Sangalo on "Transformar", the official song of the 2016 Summer Paralympics). During their performance, Nação Zumbi's guitarist was seen with a sign reading "Fora Temer" ("Temer, Get Out"), referencing President of Brazil Michel Temer.

=== Tokyo 2020: Positive Switch ===
Following the official handover ceremony, a cultural presentation was held to showcase Tokyo, host city of the 2020 Summer Paralympics. A video segment highlighted Tokyo's past hosting of the second canonical Paralympics in 1964, which were the first to use the term "Paralympic". The presentation, entitled "Positive Switch", starred Gimico—a Japanese top model with a prosthetic leg, along with Koichi Omae (a dancer who lost part of one of his legs following an accident involving a drunk driver), and visually-impaired performer Akira Hiyama—who "[shared] his view of Tokyo from his imagination".

During Philip Craven's closing speech, a moment of silence was held for Iranian cyclist Bahman Golbarnezhad, who had died the previous day in an accident during a road cycling event. He stated that his death had "affected us all and left the whole Paralympic Movement united in grief." Craven went on to praise Brazil's reception to the Games and the overall performances of athletes, stating that people "were in awe at what you could do and forgot about what they believed you could not. You showed to the world that with a positive attitude the human body, and above all the human heart and mind, knows no limits and absolutely anything is possible." Craven also announced that he would bestow the Paralympic Order—the IPC's highest honour, on the people of Brazil and Rio de Janeiro for their "outstanding support" of the Paralympics.

== Anthems ==
- Saulo Laucas – Brazilian national anthem
- Ivete Sangalo's band – Paralympic anthem
- NHK Tokyo Children's Choir and Otowa Yurikago Kai – Japanese national anthem

== See also ==
- 2016 Summer Olympics closing ceremony
