= Multishow ao Vivo: Ivete no Maracanã =

Live album DVD by Ivete Sangalo
- Released: March 21, 2007
- Recorded: December 16, 2006 (Maracanã Stadium)
- Genre: Axé, Samba-Reggae, Pop
- Length: 162 minutes
- Label: Universal Music
- Producer: Alexandre Lins; Joana Mazzucchelli

Ivete Sangalo chronology
O Melhor de Ivete Sangalo (2006)	Multishow ao Vivo: Ivete no Maracanã (2007)	Pode Entrar (2009)

Multishow ao Vivo: Ivete no Maracanã is Ivete Sangalo's second live album (ninth overall). The album has sold over two million copies in Brazil (being certified Diamond), and features the single "Deixo". It was recorded live at Maracanã Stadium for the cable TV channel Multishow. It was nominated for three Latin Grammy Awards.

The album had five singles:

- "Berimbal Metalizado"- the first single from the live album, the song was a smash hit in South America.
- Deixo - the song was a hit in Brazil and Portugal.
- Não Precisa Mudar - a duet with Saulo Fernandes, was a smash hit in Brazil.
- Ilumina - the fourth single was a moderate success.
- Corazón Partío - the fifth and final single. It is a duet with Spanish singer Alejandro Sanz and was available only for airplay.

== Track listing ==
1. "Never Gonna Give You Up" (Instrumental) / "Abalou"
2. "Não Quero Dinheiro (Só Quero Amar)"
3. "Berimbau Metalizado"
4. "Corazón Partío" (featuring Alejandro Sanz)
5. "Ilumina"
6. "Não Me Conte Seus Problemas"
7. "Não Precisa Mudar" (featuring Saulo Fernandes)
8. "A Galera"
9. "Dengo de Amor"
10. "Citação: é Difícil" / "Chorando Se Foi"
11. "Bota pra Ferver" (featuring Durval Lelys)
12. "Quando a Chuva Passar"
13. "Deixo"
14. "Não Vou Ficar" (featuring Samuel Rosa)
15. "Nosso Sonho" / "Conquista" / "Poder" (featuring MC Buchecha)
16. "País Tropical" / "Arerê" / "Taj Mahal"
17. "Completo" (Bonus track)

== Latin Grammy nominations ==
- Best Brazilian Contemporary Pop Album
- Best Brazilian Song - "Berimbau Metalizado" - Miro Almeida, Dória & Duller (songwriters)
- Best Long Form Music Video - Joana Mazzucchelli (director), Wilson Cunha (producer)

== Charts ==
=== Year-end charts ===
Chart (2007)	Peak position
Brazilian Albums (Pro-Música Brasil)	2

Chart (2008)	Peak position
Brazilian Albums (Pro-Música Brasil)	5

== Certifications ==
Country	Certification(s) (sales thresholds)
Brasil	3× Platinum (CD)
Brasil	2× Diamond (DVD)
