= Visi =

Visi may refer to:

- Carla Visi (born 1970), a popular Brazilian axé and MPB singer, songwriter, occasional actress and television show host
- Michel Visi (1954–2007), the bishop of the Roman Catholic Diocese of Port-Vila, Vanuatu
- an abbreviation for Our Lady of the Visitation School in Cincinnati, Ohio
- Volt Information Sciences' ticker symbol (VISI)

== See also ==
- Visi-Flash, the trade name used by R. E. Dietz Company for their line of battery powered transistorized barricade warning lights
- Visi On, a short-lived but influential graphical user interface-based operating environment program by VisiCorp's for IBM PC compatible personal computers running early versions of MS-DOS
- The Vesi, a Roman-era barbarian people who were apparent ancestors to the Visigoths
