= Banda Eva =

Brazilian music group

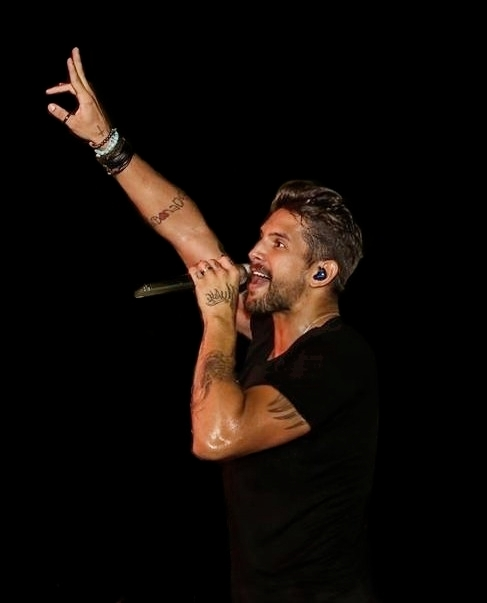
- Banda Eva live in 2017.

Background information
- Also known as: EVA
- Origin: Salvador, Bahia, Brazil
- Genres: Axé; reggae; samba
- Years active: 1980–present
- Labels: Sony, PolyGram, Universal, Abril, Som Livre
- Members: Felipe Pezzoni; Marcelinho Oliveira; Hugo Alves; Alex Pontes; Esso Brumom; Cristiano Ferreira; Ton Carvalho; Jorginho Sancof
- Past members: Ivete Sangalo; Emanuelle Araújo; Saulo Fernandes
- Website: http://www.grupoeva.com.br/

Banda Eva is a Brazilian music group from Salvador da Bahia. Their current lead singer is Felipe Pezzoni. The group is notable for being home to superstar singer Ivete Sangalo for several years at the start of her career, before she departed on a solo career, the band has sold more than 6 million albums. Initially it was a carnival block from Salvador, in the 90s it became a musical group.

== Albums ==
=== Studio albums ===
List of albums, with sales and certifications
Album	Details	Sales	Certification
Banda Eva	Released: 1 December 1993; Format: CD, LP, Fita cassette; Label: Sony Music	BRA: 100.000	ABPD: Gold
Pra Abalar	Released: 1 May 1994; Format: CD, LP, cassette; Label: PolyGram	BRA: 150.000	ABPD: Gold
Hora H	Released: 11 June 1995; Format: CD, LP, cassette; Label: PolyGram	BRA: 200.000	ABPD: Gold
Beleza Rara	Released: 13 June 1996; Format: CD, cassette; Label: PolyGram	BRA: 500.000	ABPD: 2× Platinum
Eva, Você e E	Released: 1 October 1998; Format: CD, cassette; Label: Universal	BRA: 700.000	ABPD: 2× Platinum
Experimenta	Released: 7 November 2000; Format: CD; Label: Universal	BRA: 220.000	ABPD: Gold
Pra Valer	Released: 18 August 2002; Format: CD; Label: Abril Music	BRA: 80.000	
Lugar da Alegria	Released: 18 October 2009; Format: CD, Download digital; Label: Som Livre	BRA: 40.000	
CNRT - Conexão Nagô Rede Tambor	Released: 20 January 2012; Format: CD, download digital; Label: Som Livre	BRA: 25.000	
Simplesmente	Released: 12 November 2013; Format: CD, download digital; Label: Independent		

=== Live albums ===
List of albums, with sales and certifications
Album	Details	Sales	Certification
Banda Eva Ao Vivo	Released: 7 July 1997; Format: CD; Label: Universal	BRA: 2.200.000	ABPD: Diamond
Banda Eva Ao Vivo II	Released: 19 November 1999; Format: CD; Label: Universal	BRA: 880.000	ABPD: 3× |Platinum
É do Eva - Ao Vivo	Released: 7 December 2003; Format: CD; Label: Universal	BRA: 120.000	ABPD: Gold
Banda Eva 25 Anos Ao Vivo	Released: 17 September 2005; Format: CD; Label: Universal	BRA: 250.000	ABPD: Platinum
Veja Alto, Ouça Colorido	Released: 20 de novembro de 2007; Format: CD, download digital; Label: Som Livre	BRA: 125.000	ABPD: Platinum
Sunset	Released: 13 November 2015; Format: CD, download digital; Label: Universal		

=== Compilations ===
List of albums
Album	Details
Sem Limite	Released: 2 May 2001; Format: CD; Label: Universal
Millennium	Released: 13 August 1998; Format: CD; Label: PolyGram
Beleza Rara - O Melhor da Banda Eva	Released: 2 December 1999; Format: CD; Label: PolyGram
Axé Bahia	Released: 12 January 2005; Format: CD; Label: Universal

=== Extended plays (EPs) ===
List of albums, with sales and certifications
Album	Details
25 Anos: Especial Digital	Released: 9 September 2005; Format: Download digital; Label: Universal

=== Live albums ===
List of albums, with sales and certifications
Album	Details	Sales	Certification
Banda Eva 25 Anos Ao Vivo	Released: 15 October 2005; Format: DVD; Label: Universal	BRA: 75.000	ABPD: Gold
Veja Alto, Ouça Colorido	Released: 20 November 2007; Format: DVD, download digital; Label: Som Livre		
Lugar da Alegria	Released: 11 November 2009; Format: DVD, download digital; Label: Som Livre		
Sunset	Released: 13 November 2015; Format: DVD, download digital; Label: Universal		

== Singles ==
List of albums, with sales and certifications
Single	Year	Peak chart positions		Certification	Album
Single	Year	BRA	BRA Regional Salvador	Certification	Album
"Adeus Bye Bye"	1993	9	—		Banda Eva
"Pout-Pourri"	1993	35	—		Banda Eva
"Flores (Sonho Épico)"	1994	10	—		Pra Abalar
"Alô Paixão"	1994	5	—		Pra Abalar
"Pra Abalar"	1994	3	—		Pra Abalar
"Me Abraça"	1995	3	—		Hora H
"Coleção"	1995	28	—		Hora H
"Pegue Aí"	1995	9	—		Hora H
"Manda Ver"	1996	20	—		Hora H
"Beleza Rara"	1996	1	—		Beleza Rara
"Levada Louca"	1996	1	—		Beleza Rara
"Química Perfeita"	1996	12	—		Beleza Rara
"Eva"	1997	1	—		Banda Eva Ao Vivo
"Vem Meu Amor"	1997	3	—		Banda Eva Ao Vivo
"Arerê"	1998	1	—		Banda Eva Ao Vivo
"Leva Eu"	1998	1	—		Banda Eva Ao Vivo
"Carro Velho"	1998	1	—		Eva, Você e Eu
"De Ladinho"	1999	5	—		Eva, Você e Eu
"Chuva de Verão"	1999	2	—		Banda Eva Ao Vivo II
"Pra Lá e Pra Cá"	2000	1	—		Banda Eva Ao Vivo II
"Oh Dó"	2000	7	—		Banda Eva Ao Vivo II
"Quem Ama"	2000	3	—		Experimenta
"Amor na Rede"	2000	8	—		Experimenta
"My Love"	2000	2	—		Experimenta
"Levada do Amor"	2001	6	—		Experimenta
"Coisa Linda"	2002	13	—		Pra Valer
"Minha Menina"	2002	39	—		Pra Valer
"É do Eva"	2003	46	—		É do Eva - Ao Vivo
"A Rosa"	2003	69	—		É do Eva - Ao Vivo
"Não Me Conte Seus Problemas" (feat. Ivete Sangalo)	2005	1	—	ABPD: Gold	Banda Eva 25 Anos Ao Vivo
"Refrão"	2005	85	—		Banda Eva 25 Anos Ao Vivo
"EVA" (feat. Ivete Sangalo, Emanuelle Araújo, Durval Lelys, Luiz Caldas)	2005	32	—		Banda Eva 25 Anos Ao Vivo
"Anjo" (part. Daniela Mercury)	2006	29	—		Banda Eva 25 Anos Ao Vivo
"Eu Vou No Eva"	2006	5	—		Banda Eva 25 Anos Ao Vivo
"Nosso Amor é Lindo"	2008	97	—		Veja Alto, Ouça Colorido
"Anjo (Live)"	2008	73	—		Veja Alto, Ouça Colorido
"Toda Linda"	2008	9	—		Veja Alto, Ouça Colorido
"Rua 15"	2009	92	—		Veja Alto, Ouça Colorido
"Lugar da Alegria"	2009	—	1		Lugar da Alegria
"Tudo Certo na Bahia" (feat. Ninha)	2009	—	1		Lugar da Alegria
"Tão Sonhada"	2010	—	2		Lugar da Alegria
"Agradecer"	2010	—	1		Lugar da Alegria
"Circulou"	2011	37	1		CNRT - Conexão Nagô Rede Tambor
"Sei"	2012	—	3		CNRT - Conexão Nagô Rede Tambor
"Preta"	2012	50	1		CNRT - Conexão Nagô Rede Tambor
"Simplesmente"	2013	—	—		Simplesmente
"Se Joga Por Cima de Mim"	2014	—	—		Simplesmente
"No Meu Jardim"	2014	—	10		Simplesmente
"Feminina"	2014	—	—		Sunset
"Moinhos de Amor"	2015	—	—		Sunset
"Brindar"	2015	—	8		Sunset
"Sem Você"	2016	—	—		Sunset
"Não Vá Embora"	2016	—	—		Sunset
"—" Denotes singles that did not enter the charts or were not released.

== Other appearances ==
Title	Year	Others artists	Album
"Timbaleiro"	1994	—N/a	Pop Verão 94
"Tropicália"	1996	Gera Samba, Ricardo Chaves, Olodum, Asa de Águia, Banda Mel, Márcia Freire, Netinho, Ara Ketu, Cheiro de Amor, Timbalada e Faróis Acesos	Axê Caê!
"Química Perfeita"	1996	Netinho	Bailando Salsa & Merengue
"Não Identificado"	1997	—N/a	Tropicália 30 Anos
"Fiesta Brasileira (Mais Uma Vez)"	1998	Netinho, Cheiro de Amor, É o Tchan! e Zeca Pagodinho	SunDance
"Frisson"	1999	—N/a	Suave Veneno
"É Agora"	1999	—N/a	Ah! Eu Tô Maluco!
"Passinho do Amor"	2002	—N/a	Axé Bahia 2002
"Dê no que Der"	2002	—N/a	Axé Bahia 2002
"Chorando Saudade"	2006	—N/a	Hot Brazil

== Musical videos ==
Title	Year	Director(s)	Ref.
"Beleza Rara"	1996	Unknown	
"Tic Tic Tac"	1996	Unknown	
"Carro Velho"	1998	Unknown	
"De Ladinho"	1999	André Horta	
"Duas Medidas"	2004	Unknown	
"Anjo"	2005	Unknown	
"Rua 15"	2007	Unknown	
"Só por Ti"	2008	Pico Garcez	
"Circulou"	2012	Unknown	
"You and Me (Bem Mais)"	2013	Victor Jimmy e David Campbell	
"Simplesmente"	2013	Victor Jimmy e David Campbell	
"No Meu Jardim"	2014	Zunk Ramos	
"Moinhos de Amor"	2015	Unknown	
"Sem Você"	2016	Luciana Ramos e Fabiano Pierri	
