= Jennifer Stumm =

- Genres: Classical
- Occupation: Violist
- Instrument: Viola
- Labels: Naxos, Sonimage

Jennifer Stumm is a concert violist, professor of viola at the University of Music and Arts of the City of Vienna and director of the Ilumina Festival in São Paulo.

== Life ==
Originally from Atlanta, Georgia, Stumm studied at the Curtis Institute of Music in Philadelphia with the viola pedagogue Karen Tuttle. She also studied at the University of Pennsylvania, and earned her Master of Music degree from the Juilliard School in New York. She later studied with violist Nobuko Imai in Amsterdam and cellist Steven Isserlis whom she met at the International Musicians Seminar at Prussia Cove. Stumm is outspoken in support of the viola's own identity as an instrument distinct from the violin.

== Career ==
Stumm is a prize winner of three large international competitions — first prize of the Primrose International Viola Competition, second prize at the International Competition in Geneva and the Vriendenkrans Concours of the Concertgebouw, Amsterdam. In 2006 she became the first viola player ever to win first prize of the Concert Artist Guild International Auditions in New York. Her recent performances include her Carnegie Hall recital debut, Kennedy Center debut in Washington, D.C. as well as performances at Alice Tully Hall, New York, the Wigmore Hall and St. John's, Smith Square, London and the Concertgebouw, Amsterdam, at the Sitka Festival in Alaska and the National Concert Hall of Panama. She has performed Don Quixote (a tone poem for cello, viola and orchestra by Richard Strauss) with conductor Yan-Pascal Tortellier at the Bridgewater Hall, Manchester and the Sage, Gateshead, and the Bartok Concerto with the Hamburger Sinfonikern in Berlin and the L'Orchestre du Chambre, Geneva. She has appeared in the Rising Stars Series of the Ravinia Festival, Chicago, at the Verbier Festival, Switzerland, and has been heard on BBC Radio 3, NPR, and the Dutch and German national radio networks. For the BBC, she performed in Scotland and at the Sage Gateshead's Festival of Russian Music, as well as two live Wigmore Hall performances. She made her BBC Proms debut in 2008, returning in 2009. She appeared on the cover of Symphony Magazine's January 2011 issue.

In 2011 she spoke about the viola in a talk, "The Imperfect Instrument," at the TEDx Aldeburgh conference which was an editor's pick of all talks on ted.com and gained nearly 200,000 views. She went to perform a recital program based around the talk at the Berlin Philharmonie.

Stumm's collaborative partners have included members of the Beaux Arts Trio, Guaneri, Juilliard and Alban Berg Quartets, and the period ensemble L'Archibudelli. She was a BBC New Generation Artist and a Borletti Buitoni Trust Award recipient. She participates regularly at the International Musicians Seminar in Cornwall, having performed in that festival's annual tour, and has spent a number of summers at the Marlboro Music Festival in Vermont. Other festival appearances include the Delft, Spoleto, Stavanger, and Aldeburgh Festivals and the Kronberg Academy's Chamber Music Connects the World.

Her first disc for Naxos of virtuoso Italian works for viola was released in 2011. Her second disc, Harold in Italy, of the Berlioz work with songs by Franz Liszt was released by Orchid Classics.

Stumm is currently University Professor at the University of Music and Arts in the City of Vienna, International Chair of Viola Studies at the Royal College of Music, London, and guest professor at the Royal Conservatoire The Hague.

She founded the Ilumina Festival, a music festival and social project in São Paulo, Brazil, in 2015.
