= Kindala =

Studio album by Margareth Menezes
- Released: 1991
- Label: Mango
- Producer: Nestor Madrid

Margareth Menezes chronology
Um Canto Pra Subir (1990)	Kindala (1991)	Luz Dourada (1993)

Kindala is an album by the Brazilian musician Margareth Menezes. It was released in 1991. It reached the top 10 on Billboard's World Albums chart. Menezes supported the album with an international tour.

== Production ==
The album was produced by Nestor Madrid. Jimmy Cliff sang on "Me Abraça e Me Beija", which he also cowrote. "Fé Cega, Faca Amolada" is a cover of the Milton Nascimento song. "Jet Ski" is a protest song about, among other things, environmental degradation in Brazil.

== Critical reception ==
Professional ratings
Review scores
Source	Rating
AllMusic	4.5/5 stars
Chicago Tribune	3/4 stars
The Encyclopedia of Popular Music	3/5 stars
Entertainment Weekly	A−
MusicHound World: The Essential Album Guide	3/5 stars
The News & Observer	3/4 stars

Entertainment Weekly wrote that the album melds "the rough rhythms of Bahia with modern technology." The Chicago Tribune stated that the "samba-reggae" sound "joins thundering Afro-Brazilian bloco afro percussion with the well-recognized rhythms and social messages of reggae."

The Province said that Kindala adds "reggae and African rhythms to a mighty orchestra of latin percussion." Newsday determined that it "leans most heavily towards a percussive unification of samba's big-bottom strut with reggae's languorous lope."

AllMusic wrote: "In contrast to so much of the softer, more jazz-influenced pop that has come out of Rio de Janeiro, Kindala is grittier and notably percussive, yet consistently melodic."

== Track listing ==
No.	Title	Length
1.	"Fé Cega, Faca Amolada"
2.	"Paz No Mundo (Pwazon Rat)"
3.	"Negrume da Noite"
4.	"Jet Ski"
5.	"Negro Nago"
6.	"Vendaval Temporal"
7.	"Me Abraça e Me Beija"
8.	"Repique Romântico"
9.	"Kindala"
10.	"Menina Dandára"
11.	"Praga Do Céu"
12.	"Pot-Pourri 'Samba Reggae'"
