= Margareth Menezes =

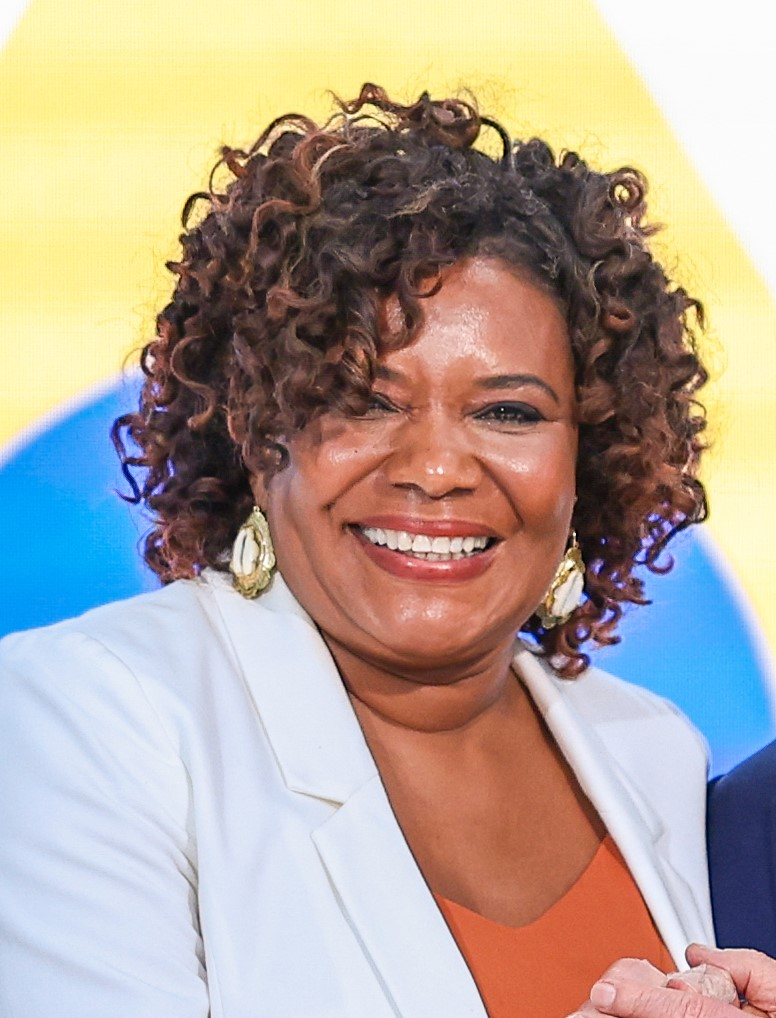
- Menezes in 2023

Minister of Culture
- Incumbent
- Assumed office 1 January 2023
- President: Luiz Inácio Lula da Silva
- Preceded by: Sérgio Sá Leitão (2018)

Personal details
- Born: Margareth Menezes da Purificação; 13 October 1962 (age 63) Salvador, Bahia, Brazil
- Musical career
- Also known as: Maga
- Genres: Axé; samba reggae; afrobeat
- Occupations: Singer; composer
- Instruments: Vocal; guitar
- Years active: 1980–present
- Labels: PolyGram; Island Records; Continental; Estrela do Mar; Universal; EMI; MZA
- Website: margarethmenezes.com.br

Margareth Menezes da Purificação (born 13 October 1962) is a Brazilian singer and politician from Salvador, Bahia. She currently serves as Minister of Culture under Luiz Inácio Lula da Silva.

Her style is considered axé but her music also steers into samba and MPB, at times drawing on African rhythms and reggae.

Menezes is best known in Brazil for the debut single "Faraó (Divindade do Egito)" 1988 of Olodum and for "Me Abraça e Me Beija", a major hit in 1990. She also scored another hit with "Dandalunda", a song which reached notable popularity during the 2003 Salvador carnival.

== Music career ==
Menezes achieved superstardom in her native Bahia, but only moderate success in the rest of Brazil. She is known for energetic live performances and regularly tours and performs at carnival celebrations.

In 1990, one of Menezes's tracks "Elegibô (Uma Historia De Ifa)" was used in the Mickey Rourke film Wild Orchid. This prompted Island Records in the US to release a compilation album of some of her older material from Brazil on their subsidiary label, Mango. The album, simply titled Elegibô, was a fast hit, reaching # 1 on the Billboard World Music chart at a time when David Byrne was championing Brazilian music in the US. The title track reached limited popularity in the US and Europe. The album also received a full release in the UK, Germany and France. A single, "Tenda do Amor", was released from the album in some European territories. Menezes toured internationally on the back of this album, getting some press in the process. A second US-released follow-up album Kindala, released late 1991, but repackaged in some territories from the Brazilian version of the same name, also achieved some success. This release also gave Menezes a minor hit album in France too.

In 2001, Menezes released the acclaimed Afropopbrasileiro (also known as "Maga") showcasing her fusion of afro-Brazilian beats. The album was produced by Carlinhos Brown and was well received both in Brazil and internationally. Menezes also co-wrote and performed on the 2003 hit "Passe Em Casa", from Tribalistas. This was another collaboration with Brown.

Her 2005 single, "Como Tu", a duet with Brazilian superstar Ivete Sangalo was released amidst much hype because Sangalo was achieving platinum album sales at the time. The track reached the lower reaches of the airplay Top 30 in Brazil but failed to emulate the success of recent Sangalo hits. The hit single was lifted from Menezes' 2005 album release Pra Você; the album received lukewarm reviews, possibly owing to a more pop-like sound than previous releases. A second, more reggae-influenced, single, "Miragem na esquina" performed poorly at radio.

In 2006, the album Pra Você received a Grammy nomination for "Best Brazilian Contemporary Pop Album".

More recently, Menezes participated on the track "Beijo Descarado" by Timbalada which achieved some airplay success in Brazil during the 2007 Carnival celebrations.

In 2010, an acoustic version of her 2008 album Naturalmente was released. The album was recorded at Ilha dos Sapos and featured guests like Gilberto Gil, Carlinhos Brown and Portuguese singer Luis Represas.

Menezes remains popular among contemporary Brazilian artists. She became Brazil's Minister of Culture on 1 January 2023.

== Discography ==
Studio albums

- 1988: Margareth Menezes
- 1989: Um Canto Pra Subir
- 1991: Kindala (#2 at Billboard Top World Albums)
- 1993: Luz Dourada
- 1995: Gente de Festa
- 2001: Afropopbrasileiro
- 2005: Pra Você
- 2008: Naturalmente

Compilation

- 1989: Elegibô (#1 at Billboard Top World Albums)

Live albums

- 2003: Tete A Tete Margareth
- 2004: Festival de Verão de Salvador
- 2007: Brasileira Ao Vivo: Uma Homenagem Ao Samba-Reggae
- 2010: Naturalmente Acústico

Other Albums

- 1998: Disco Autoral

Political offices
Preceded by Sérgio Sá Leitão (2018)	Minister of Culture; 2023–present	Incumbent
