= Desejo de Amar =

Single by Ivete Sangalo

from the album Multishow ao Vivo: Ivete Sangalo no Madison Square Garden
- Released: January 06, 2011
- Recorded: September 4, 2010 (at the Madison Square Garden)
- Genre: Axé
- Length: 3:41
- Label: Universal
- Songwriter(s): Alain Tavares e Rita Mendes

Ivete Sangalo singles chronology
"Acelera Aê (Noite do Bem)" (2010)	"Desejo de Amar" (2011)	"Pensando em Nós Dois" (2011)

"Desejo de Amar " is a song performed by the Brazilian recording artist Ivete Sangalo, taken from her third live album Multishow ao Vivo: Ivete Sangalo no Madison Square Garden. Written by Alain Tavares & Rita Mendes, the song is an axé music song, that talks about desiring and loving someone. It was released as the album's second single on January 6, 2011, on the Brazilian radio stations. The song was the summer and carnival song. It reach number thirty-four on the Billboard Brasil charts.

== Critical reception ==
Ana Berón from Mirador Nacional said that the song "was one of the most exciting tracks from the show."

== Music video ==
The video was released on January 17, 2011 and it shows Ivete performing the song on the Madison Square Garden stage and on the catwalk with her dancers.

== Charts ==
Chart (2011)	Peak position
Brasil (Billboard) Hot 100	74
