= Acelera Aê (Noite do Bem) =

Single by Ivete Sangalo

from the album Multishow ao Vivo: Ivete Sangalo no Madison Square Garden
- Released: August 20, 2010
- Recorded: September 4, 2010 (at the Madison Square Garden)
- Genre: Axé Pop, electroaxé
- Length: 3:51 (studio version);4:49 (live version)
- Label: Universal
- Songwriter(s): Gigi, Magno Sant'Anna, Fabinho O'Brian e Dan Kambaiah

Ivete Sangalo singles chronology
"Meu Segredo" (2010)	"Acelera Aê (Noite do Bem)" (2010)	"Desejo de Amar" (2011)

"Acelera Aê (Noite do Bem)" is a song performed by the Brazilian recording artist Ivete Sangalo, taken from her third live album Multishow ao Vivo: Ivete Sangalo no Madison Square Garden. Written by Gigi, Magno Sant'Anna, Fabinho O'Brian e Dan Kambaiah, the song is an axé pop song, that talks about getting ready for a great event. It was released as the album's lead single on August 20, 2010, in the digital download format in many countries, such as Brazil, Belgium and Portugal. The song reach number ten on the Brazilian charts.

== Critical reception ==
Jon Pareles from The New York Times gave a favorable review to the song, by saying: "A new song, "Aceleraê" ("Acceleration"), promised to dance all night: "Today is the day of Ivete!" the lyrics proclaimed."

=== Awards ===
The song received a nomination at the Latin Grammy Awards of 2011 in the category "Best Brazilian Song".

== Music video ==
The video was released on November 3, 2010, and it shows Ivete performing the song on the Madison Square Garden stage. It was directed by Nick Wickham.

=== Charts ===
Chart (2010)	Peak position
Billboard Brazil Hot 100	10

=== Release history ===
País	Data	Formato	Versão	Gravadora
Brazil	August 20, 2010	digital download	Studio Version	Universal Music Group
Belgium	August 20, 2010	digital download	Studio Version	Universal Music Group
Brasil	October 30, 2010	digital download	Live	Universal Music Group
Belgium	October 30, 2010	digital download	Live	Universal Music Group
Portugal	December 20, 2010	digital download	Both	Universal Music Group
Argentina	March 1, 2011	digital download	Live	Universal Music Group
