= Multishow ao Vivo: Ivete Sangalo no Madison Square Garden =

Live album /Video by Ivete Sangalo
- Released: December 7, 2010
- Recorded: September 4, 2010, Manhattan, New York City, NY, United States
- Genres: Axé, samba-reggae, latin pop, electropop
- Languages: Portuguese, spanish, english
- Label: Universal

Ivete Sangalo chronology
Pode Entrar: Multishow Registro (2009)	Multishow ao Vivo: Ivete Sangalo no Madison Square Garden (2010)	Real Fantasia (2012)

Singles from Multishow ao Vivo: Ivete Sangalo no Madison Square Garden
- 1. "Acelera Aê (Noite do Bem)" Released: August 20, 2010; 2. "Desejo de Amar" Released: January 6, 2011; 3. "Pensando em Nós Dois" Released: April 10, 2011; 4. "Qui Belê" Released: October 14, 2011

Multishow ao Vivo: Ivete Sangalo no Madison Square Garden is the eleventh album by the Brazilian recording artist Ivete Sangalo, released on December 7, 2010. The album was recorded during a single concert performed on September 4, 2010, at Madison Square Garden in New York. It's the fourth digital video disc from the singer and its first international release. The disc sold over 300,000 copies only on its pre-sale, which earned her a certified Triple Platinum and Gold Record by ABPD.

The album featured many singers, both domestic and international, such as Seu Jorge, Nelly Furtado, Diego Torres and Juanes. On September 11, Ivete Sangalo attended a concert by Dave Matthews Band in Dallas and recorded the song Você e Eu (You and Me), which is present on the DVD bonus disc.

On the day after the concert, Jon Pareles, chief popular-music critic in the arts section of The New York Times, issued a statement praising Sangalo saying he was "impressed" with the singer and that "she was indefatigable on stage", like a "diva".

"I'm very restless, that's why I came from a DVD that was shot at my house, very intimate, and so far from the proportions of the Maracana. I see this new work as a great challenge - for being at Madison Square Garden, in New York, and because it's an important step in my international career, as well as in my career in Brazil. And there's one more thing: though being international, this next DVD is completely rooted in Brazil. I think being restless is a part of an artist." - Ivete Sangalo.

== The idea ==
After watching a concert from the North American singer Beyoncé at Madison Square Garden, Ivete Sangalo had the idea of developing a musical project in New York, precisely at Madison Square Garden. She said the project as shot in New York not because "was in New York, but because it was a emblematic venue and all of the world's greatest artists have been there." At the end of Beyoncé's concert, Sangalo called her brother, Jesus Sangalo, and told him about her desire of making a concert there, which he agreed, asking her to come back to Brazil so they could discuss the idea.

== Critical reception ==
Professional ratings
Review scores
Source	Rating
Allmusic	3.5/5 stars
Extra	(favorable)
Miami Herald	(mixed)
Mirador Nacional	(positive)
New York Times	(favorable)
Sem Tédio	(positive)

The album received positive reviews from most music critics. Jon Pareles, from The New York Times, gave a favorable review for the album saying "she had fireworks and confetti, dancers and costumes, and a catwalk that got her closer to the audience. She was indefatigable onstage, doing fast samba footwork in high heels through a three-hour set". But he added that "it won't be easy for Ms. Sangalo to expand her territory and join performers like Beyoncé, Madonna and Shakira as a globally recognized pop star. There is, inevitably, a language barrier for songs in Portuguese." Pareles ended his review, by saying "even in New York she was playing to a home crowd." Jordan Levin from Miami Herald was mixed in his review saying "her charisma and powerful voice are unmistakable, but her bright, brassy style, or her constant championing of Brazil, may not translate." He concluded the review by saying "Sangalo has an ability to whip up a frenzy of happiness and energy that's rare for any star. For her Brazilian audience, that talent is certainly more than enough." Mauro Ferreira from Notas Musicais was mixed in his review saying that "it could have been an anthology show if the setlist had prioritized the true gems of the axé music genre, however the new material highlights the populist flair Ivete adopted in recent years." Ferreira ended his review saying the concert "ends with the impression of representing another unnecessary step down in a falling slope."

== Singles ==
The first single "Acelera Aê (Noite do Bem)" was released on August 20, 2010 and reached the number-one spot on the Brazilian charts. The second single "Desejo de Amar" was released on January 6, 2011, due to the summer and Carnival. The third single "Pensando em Nós Dois", which features Seu Jorge, was released on April 10, 2011.

== Track listing ==
Multishow ao Vivo: Ivete Sangalo no Madison Square Garden
No.	Title	Music	Length
1.	"Brasileiro"	Fábio Alcântara, Augusto Conceição e Duller	2:39
2.	"Acelera Aê (Noite do Bem)"	Gigi, Magno Sant'Anna, Fabinho O'Brian e Dan Kambaiah	4:50
3.	"Cadê Dalila?"	Carlinhos Brown e Alain Tavares	3:12
4.	"Flores (Sonho Épico)"	Gutemberg, Roberto Moura, Tico Mahahtma e Carlinhos Maracanã	3:27
5.	"Desejo de Amar"	Alain Tavares e Rita Mendes	3:41
6.	"Darte" (featuring Juanes)	Cássio Calazans	3:48
7.	"Pra Falar de Você"	Fabinho O'Brian, Rubem Tavares e Samir	4:05
8.	"Human Nature" (Michael Jackson cover)	Steven Porcaro, Steve M. Porcaro e John Bettis	4:01
9.	"Pensando em Nós Dois" (featuring Seu Jorge)	Samir	4:51
10.	"Medley Hits, Pt.1 (Me Abraça / Eternamente / Tá Tudo Bem / Pegue Aí)"	Roberto Moura e Jorge Xaréu/Davi Salles/Alexandre Peixe/Lu, Jacka Maneiro e Cay	7:23
11.	"Where It Begins" (featuring Nelly Furtado)	Ivete Sangalo, Nelly Furtado, Gigi & Lester Mendez	4:31
12.	"Easy" ((The Commodores cover))	Lionel Richie	3:58
13.	"Ahora Ya Sé (Agora Eu Já Sei)" (featuring Diego Torres)	Gigi, Ivete Sangalo/ Carolina Migoya (Spanish version)	4:41
14.	"Meu Segredo"	Ramón Cruz	4:31
15.	"Berimbau Metalizado"	Duller, Miro Almeida e Dória	4:01
16.	"Qui Belê"	Ramón Cruz	3:04
17.	"Festa / Sorte Grande"	Anderson Cunha/Lourenço	3:37
18.	"Na Base do Beijo"	Alain Tavares; Rita Mendes	3:58
Total length:			74:00

== Charts ==
=== Certifications ===
Country	Certification(s) (sales thresholds)
Brasil	Gold (CD)
Brasil	Diamond(DVD)
