= Quanto ao Tempo =

"Quanto Ao Tempo"

Single by Ivete Sangalo

from the album Pode Entrar
- Released: August 18, 2009
- Recorded: 2008
- Genre: Soul
- Length: 4:34
- Label: Universal
- Songwriter: Carlinhos Brown
- Producer: Carlinhos Brown

Ivete Sangalo singles chronology
"Agora Eu Já Sei" (2009)	"Quanto Ao Tempo" (2009)	"Na Base do Beijo" (2009)

"Quanto Ao Tempo"(Regarding Time) is a song performed by the Brazilian singer Ivete Sangalo, released as the third single from her album Pode Entrar, released on August 18 on the radio stations.

The song is a soul duet with Carlinhos Brown and was recorded in late 2008.

== Reception ==
The song received generally positive reviews from the critics, that considers the song "a great ballad, with strong and beautiful lyrics and a perfect duo".

== Music video ==
The music video was released in August on the Multishow channel.

== Chart performance ==
The song debuted on the Salvador Hot Songs at #6.

== Charts ==
Chart (2009)	Peak position
Brasil Hot 100 Airplay (Billboard Brasil)	30
Brasil Hot Popular (Billboard Brasil)	15
Salvador Hot Songs (Billboard Brasil)	6
