= Pode Entrar: Multishow Registro =

Pode Entrar

Studio album by Ivete Sangalo
- Released: June 5, 2009
- Recorded: 2009
- Genre: MPB, pop, axé, forró
- Length: 66:32
- Language: Portuguese
- Label: Universal

Ivete Sangalo chronology
Multishow ao Vivo: Ivete no Maracanã (2006)	Pode Entrar (2009)	Multishow ao Vivo: Ivete Sangalo no Madison Square Garden (2010)

Singles from Pode Entrar
- 1. "Cadê Dalila" Released: November 28, 2008; 2. "Agora Eu Já Sei" Released: April 23, 2009; 3. "Quanto Ao Tempo" Released: August 18, 2009; 4. "Na Base do Beijo" Released: October 30, 2009; 5. "Meu Segredo" Released: April 13, 2010

Professional ratings
Review scores
Source	Rating
Allmusic	4/5 stars
G1	(Positive)

Pode Entrar is the sixth studio album by the Brazilian singer Ivete Sangalo released on June 5, 2009.

The album was recorded and videotaped in a studio set up at the singer's home in Salvador. The project depicts Sangalo in an intimate setting, entertaining friends at her house and collaborating with other high-profile Brazilian performers.

Guest artists include Maria Bethânia, Lulu Santos and Carlinhos Brown, Marcelo Camelo (leader of the band Los Hermanos) and group Aviões do Forró (represented by singers Alexandre Avião and Solange Almeida, the accordion player Valcir and drummer Pedro Riquelme), and Saulo Fernandes, Sangalo's friend and current leader of her former band Banda Eva.

The album sold over 300,000 copies in Brazil within 7 months of its release and spawned 4 singles: "Cadê Dalila", "Agora Eu Já Sei", "Quanto Ao Tempo" and the newest Na Base do Beijo".

== Track listing ==
Multishow Registro: Pode Entrar
No.	Title	Music	Length
1.	"Balakbak"	Esquisito, Pururu, Binho Nunes, Sand Vidal	4:15
2.	"Cadê Dalila"	Carlinhos Brown, Alain Tavares	3:11
3.	"Teus Olhos" (Featuring Marcelo Camelo)	Marcelo Camelo	3:57
4.	"Agora Eu Já Sei"	Ivete Sangalo, Gigi	4:37
5.	"Brumário" (Featuring Lulu Santos)	Lulu Santos	4:04
6.	"Meu Segredo"	Ramón Cruz	4:00
7.	"Completo" (Featuring Mônica Sangalo)	Ivete Sangalo, Gigi	3:57
8.	"Eu Tô Vendo"	Ivete Sangalo, Fabinho O'Brian, Gigi	3:30
9.	"Na Base do Beijo"	Alain Tavares, Rita Mendes	3:11
10.	"Sintonia e Desejo" (Featuring Aviões do Forró)	Ivete Sangalo, Gigi	3:43
11.	"Oba Oba"	Ivan Lawinscky, Ivan Brasil, Sinho Maia	3:50
12.	"Viver com Amor"	Ramón Cruz	3:12
13.	"Vale Mais" (Featuring Saulo Fernandes)	Ramón Cruz, Ivete Sangalo	4:12
14.	"Meu Maior Presente"	Ramón Cruz	3:52
15.	"Quanto Ao Tempo" (Featuring Carlinhos Brown)	Carlinhos Brown, Michael Sullivan	4:34
16.	"Muito Obrigado Axé" (Featuring Maria Bethânia)	Carlinhos Brown	4:44
17.	"Não Me Faça Esperar"	Fabinho O'Brian, Gigi	3:35
Total length:			63:02

== Charts ==
=== Certifications ===
Country	Certification(s) (sales thresholds)
Brasil	Gold
Portugal	Gold
