= Festa (album) =

Studio album by Ivete Sangalo
- Released: December 5, 2001
- Genre: Axé, dance, pop, MPB
- Length: 55:00
- Label: UMG

Ivete Sangalo chronology
Beat Beleza (2000)	Festa (2001)	Clube Carnavalesco Inocentes em Progresso (2003)

Singles from Festa
- 1. "Festa" Released: November 30, 2001; 2. "Penso" Released: June 15, 2002; 3. "Astral" Released: December 3, 2002

Festa is the third studio album released by Brazilian singer Ivete Sangalo, released on December 5, 2001.

== Track listing ==
No.	Title	Writer(s)	Length
1.	"Ruas E Rios"		4:18
2.	"Festa"	Cunha	3:44
3.	"Astral"	Didalva, Martins	4:03
4.	"Penso"		3:36
5.	"Meu Maior Presente"	Ramón Cruz	3:37
6.	"E Tudo Mais"	Nando Reis	3:35
7.	"O Grande Chefe"		3:45
8.	"Tum Tum Goiaba"		3:37
9.	"Aqui Vai Rolar"		3:23
10.	"Pop Zen"		4:58
11.	"Em Mim, Em Voce"		3:40
12.	"Assimetrica"	Ivete Sangalo, Marquinhos Carvalho	5:35
13.	"Narizinho"		3:08
14.	"Back at One" (featuring Brian McKnight)	MckNight, Sangalo	4:19

== Certifications ==
Country	Certification	Sales/shipments
Brazil (ABPD)	2× Platinum	500.000
