= Beat Beleza =

Studio album by Ivete Sangalo
- Released: 2000
- Genre: Axé music
- Length: 51:10
- Label: Mercury Records; Universal Music

Ivete Sangalo chronology
Ivete Sangalo (1999)	Beat Beleza (2000)	Festa (2001)

Singles from Beat Beleza
- 1. "Pererê" Released: December 7, 2000; 2. "A Lua Q Eu T Dei" Released: March 20, 2001; 3. "Bug, Bug, Bye, Bye" Released: August 3, 2001; 4. "Empurra-Empurra" Released: September 28, 2001

Professional ratings
Review scores
Source	Rating
Allmusic	2.5/5 stars

Beat Beleza is the second album released by Brazilian singer Ivete Sangalo.

== Track listing ==
No.	Title	Writer(s)	Length
1.	"Me Deixa em Paz (Can You Read My Mind)"	Dudu Falcão, Ivete Sangalo	4:19
2.	"Tanta Saudade"	Djavan, Chico Buarque	3:53
3.	"Pererê"	Algusto Conceição, Chiclete	3:18
4.	"Rosa Roseira"	Alain Tavares, Gilson Babilonia	3:20
5.	"Bug, Bug, Bye, Bye"	Augusto Conceição, Chiclete, Rayala	4:05
6.	"A Lua Q Eu T Dei"	Herbert Vianna	3:32
7.	"Balanço Black" (Featuring Gilberto Gil)	Chiclete, Cassiano, André Franzine	3:57
8.	"Postal"	Cassiano	4:42
9.	"Beat Beleza"	Boghan Costa, Rubem Tavares	3:59
10.	"Vira, Vira"	Pierre Onasis, Paulo Jorge, Roberto Ramos	3:42
11.	"Quer que Eu Vá"	Leo Bitt Bitt, João Paulo, Juliana Montal	3:48
12.	"Meu Abraço"	Ivete Sangalo, Marquinhos Carvalho	3:54
13.	"Romance Muito Louco"	Jamoliva, Silvio Almeida, Joccylee	3:49

== Personnel ==
- Bandolim, Cavaquinho - Ailton
- Composer - Alain Tavares
- Baixo - Alberto Continentino
- Cello - Alceu Reis
- Agogo, Arranger, Guitar, Keyboards, Vocals - Alfredo Moura
- Alto Saxophone - Andreas Becker
- Cordas, Violin - Antonella Pareschi
- Coro, Laughs - Augusto Conceição
- Cordas, Spalla, Violin - Bernardo Bessler
- Mastering - Bernie Grundman
- Composer - Boghan Costa
- Composer - Brandon Barnes
- Composer - Brian McKnight
- Bateria, Prato - Cesinha
- Composer - Chiclete Com Banana
- Composer - Chico Buarque
- Darbouka, Percussion, Tarola, Timbaus - Du
- Letra - Dudu Falcão
- Cordas, Violin - Eduardo Hack
- Choir Arrangement - Eduardo Souto Neto
- Cordas, Violin - Erasmo Carlos
- Assistant - Fernando Fischgold
- Trombone - Ferreira
- Viola - Frederick Stephany
- Coro - Fábio Alcântara
- Graphic Coordinator - Geraldo Alves Pinto
- Arranger, Guitar, Percussion, Surdo Virado, Viola - Gerson Silva
- Performer, Primary Artist - Gilberto Gil
- Flugelhorn, Bass Trumpet - Guiga Scott
- Assistant - Guilherme Medeiros
- Berimbau, Congas, Effects, Gong, Pandeiro, Percussion, Shaker, Timbaus - Gustavo de Dalva
- Composer, Performer, Primary Artist - Herbert Vianna
- Agogo, Pan Pipes, Percussion - Ivanzinho
- Composer, Coro, Keyboards, Letra, Primary Artist, Vocals - Ivete Sangalo
- Cello - Jaques Morelenbaum
- Composer - Jeff Lorber
- Viola - Jesuina Noronha Passaroto
- Cordas, Violin - Joao Daltro
- Baixo - Jorge Helder
- Cordas, Violin - Jose Alves
- Vibraphone - Jota Moraes
- Piano - Kiko Continentino
- Agogo, Congas, Pandeiro, Percussion, Timbales - Leonardo Reis
- Arranger, Flute, Program, Tenor Saxophone - Letieres Leite
- Arranger, Guitar - Luis Brasil
- Assistant - Luizão Maia
- Cordas, Violin - Michel Bessler
- Keyboards, Loop - Mikael Mutti
- Cello - Márcio Mallard
- Graphic Design - Neto
- Cordas, Violin - Paschoal Perrota
- Graphic Coordinator - Patricia Fernandes
- Coro - Ray Ala
- Management - Ricardo Moreira
- Cordas, Violin - Rick Amado
- A&R - Rodrigo Vidal
- Cordas, Violin - Rogério Rosa
- Alto Saxophone, Baritone Saxophone, Soprano Saxophone - Rowney Scott
- Bacurinhas, Percussion, Timbaus - Rudson Daniel

== Charts ==
=== Certifications ===
Country	Certification	Sales/shipments
Brazil (ABPD)	2× Gold	240.000
