= Estação Globo =

Brazilian television program

- Directed by: Jorge Fernando
- Presented by: Ivete Sangalo
- Country of origin: Brazil
- Original language: Portuguese

Original release
- Network: Rede Globo
- Release: December 2004

Estação Globo (transl. Globo Station) is a television program that premiered in December 2004 to celebrate Rede Globo's 40th anniversary. Since then, it became a recurring show on Globo's schedule and is always hosted by popular singer Ivete Sangalo.

The special program featured songs from the soundtracks of soap operas, performed by Globo's famous actors. Luiz Ferré's Criadores e Criaturas' TV Colosso dog puppets also made a special appearance on this special singing "Eu Não Largo o Osso" sung by Paquitas, and written by Michael Sullivan and Paulo Massadas.

The sets were built by José Cláudio and the special was directed by Jorge Fernando (director of TV Xuxa).
