= Clube Carnavalesco Inocentes em Progresso =

Studio album by Ivete Sangalo
- Released: August 26, 2003
- Recorded: 2003
- Genre: Axé, pop, MPB, reggae
- Length: 52:14
- Label: Universal Music
- Producer: Alexandre Lins; Davi Moraes

Ivete Sangalo chronology
Festa (2001)	Clube Carnavalesco Inocentes em Progresso (2003)	MTV Ao Vivo: Ivete Sangalo (2004)

Singles from Clube Carnavalesco Inocentes em Progresso
- 1. "Somente Eu e Você" Released: May 4, 2003; 2. "Sorte Grande" Released: August 8, 2003; 3. "Você e Eu, Eu e Você (Juntinhos)" Released: December 13, 2003

Clube Carnavalesco Inocentes em Progreso is the fourth studio album released by Brazilian singer Ivete Sangalo, released on August 26, 2003.

== Track list ==
From AllMusic.

No.	Title	Writer(s)	Length
1.	"Brasileiro"	Alcântara, Conceição, Duller	3:35
2.	"Ritmo Gostoso"	Babilônia, Tavares	3:29
3.	"Sorte Grande"	Lourenço	3:48
4.	"Verdadeiro Carnaval"	Aguiar, Baby, Morais, Mordes, Ribeiro	3:31
5.	"Só Pra Me Ver"	Sangalo	3:48
6.	"Pan-Americana"	Aguiar, Gurman, Morais	3:21
7.	"Faz Tempo"	Gigi, O'Brian	4:26
8.	"Retratos E Canções"	Massadas, Sullivan	3:45
9.	"Devagar E Sempre"	Gigi, Monteira	3:19
10.	"Vai Dar Certo"	Meurrahy, Reis	3:50
11.	"Azul da Moda"	Morais, Sangalo	3:19
12.	"Você E Eu, Eu E Você"	Tim Maia	3:59
13.	"Natural Collie"	McGregor, Smith	4:24
14.	"Somente Eu E Você"	Delange, Falcão, Hudson, Mills	3:12

== Certifications ==
Country	Certification	Sales/shipments
Brazil (ABPD)	2× Gold	200.000
