= Durval Lélys =

Brazilian musician

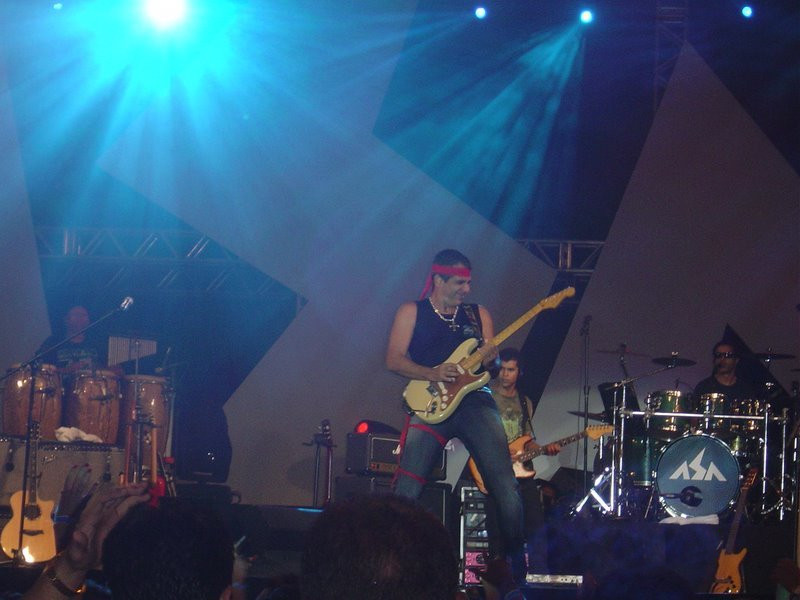
- Durval Lélys on stage

Background information
- Born: Durval Lelis Tavares; December 6, 1957 (age 68)
- Origin: Salvador, BA, Brazil
- Genres: Axé
- Occupations: Musician, songwriter
- Instruments: Vocals, electric guitar, harmonica
- Years active: 1981–present
- Labels: Universal Music; Sony BMG; Som Livre
- Website: www.durvallelys.com.br

Durval Lélys (born December 6, 1957) is a Brazilian musician, singer-songwriter, multi-instrumentalist and lyricist. He is best known as the frontman of the Salvador (Brazil)-based axé band Asa de Águia. Durval is well known as being one of the main personas from the Brazilian carnival.

Before starting his professional music career, he got a Bachelor's degree in Architecture from Federal University of Bahia (UFBA). He enjoys sculpting and designing as side activities. During his leisure time, he's an avid surfer and practitioner of SwáSthya Yôga. Durval is married and has two children.
