= Cadê Dalila =

Single by Ivete Sangalo

from the album Pode Entrar
- Released: January 2009
- Recorded: 2008
- Genre: Axé
- Length: 3:11
- Label: Universal
- Songwriter(s): Carlinhos Brown
- Producer(s): Carlinhos Brown

Ivete Sangalo singles chronology
"Corazón Partío" (2009)	"Cadê Dalila" (2009)	"Agora Eu Já Sei" (2009)

"Cadê Dalila" (Where is Dalila) is a song performed by the Brazilian singer Ivete Sangalo, released as the lead single from her album Pode Entrar. It was released in January 2009 on the radio stations and was a Carnaval hit.

== Success ==
The song was released a month earlier from the Carnaval and was a massive hit there too. In Portugal the song was a minor hit.
