= Ilumina Festival =

- Genre: Chamber music, classical music
- Locations: São Bento do Sapucaí, Brazil
- Years active: 2015-present
- Founders: Jennifer Stumm
- Website: iluminafestival.org

The Ilumina Festival is an annual chamber music festival held in Brazil.

The festival combines the objective of producing high-end classical music with a deep-rooted social mission. Professional soloists from multiple nationalities converge in a secluded venue in rural Brazil, where they commune and collaborate with a selected group of outstanding young local talents at the start of their professional careers.

Through a series of rehearsals, workshops, and masterclasses, all musicians prepare, together, for a set of concerts, open to the public and free of charge, aimed at bringing chamber music to audiences that would have otherwise limited access to it. Both soloists and fellows feed off each other’s input, and the experience provides a professional boost for alumni’s careers.

The festival operates on a non-profit basis and relies on donors, sponsors and supporters for financial viability.

== History ==
Founded by American violist and artistic director Jennifer Stumm, the festival held its first edition in the city of São Bento do Sapucaí, in January 2015.

Invited soloists for the first edition included Cristian Budu, Joseph Conyers, Giovanni Gnocchi, Esther Hoppe and Alexandra Soumm.

Concerts were held in São Bento do Sapucaí and Campos do Jordão and included works by Thomas Adès, Anton Arensky, Marcos Balter, Heinrich Ignaz Franz Biber, Johannes Brahms, Osvaldo Golijov, Gioachino Rossini, Franz Schubert, Bright Sheng, Dmitri Shostakovich, Ralph Vaughan Williams and Heitor Villa-Lobos.

Alumni from the first edition went on to new professional jobs in classical music, and to be accepted into some of the world’s leading conservatories and music programs.

== 2016 Edition ==
The second edition of the festival was held in the State of São Paulo from January 02 to 10, 2016.

All told, 7 international soloists and 20 fellows attended.

3 concerts were held: The first at the Serrinha farm, home of the festival in 2016, to an audience consisting of local community members and farm workers. The next one at the central church of Piracaia, the farm's neighboring town, again to a local audience lacking any regular classical music opportunities.

The final performance was an all-day chamber music residency at MASP, consisting of the festival’s closing concert as well as pop-up concerts throughout the museum and public areas, including the Avenida Paulista, São Paulo’s main thoroughfare.

All concerts were free of charge and fully attended, with tickets for the final concert being claimed within an hour of being made available. The festival received ample coverage through broadcast and printed media, as well as online, including by Cultura, São Paulo's Public Broadcasting Service, Rede Globo and Estado de S. Paulo.

Partnerships were formed with Cultura Artistica and the Minerva Kunststiftung, and fundraisers were held in São Paulo and London to keep operations financially viable. The festival was delivered within budget.

Alumni from the second edition were also subsequently admitted into some of the world's leading conservatories, including the Mozarteum Salzburg.

== 2017 Edition ==
The third edition of the festival is scheduled to be held in from January 02 to 15, 2017, in the state of São Paulo.

The recruitment process for local young musicians is underway, and applications are being received online.

== Musicians ==
Musicians who have partaken in and been involved in the festival include:

Jennifer Stumm (USA) – Viola and Artistic Director

Cristian Budu (Brazil) – Piano

Joseph Conyers (USA) – Double Bass

Giovanni Gnocchi (Italy) – Cello

Julia Gartemann (Germany) – Viola

Esther Hoppe (Switzerland) – Violin

Tai Murray (USA) – Violin

Alexandra Soumm (France) – Violin

== See also ==
- List of classical music festivals in South America
- List of music festivals in Brazil
