= Asa de Águia =

Brazilian axé band

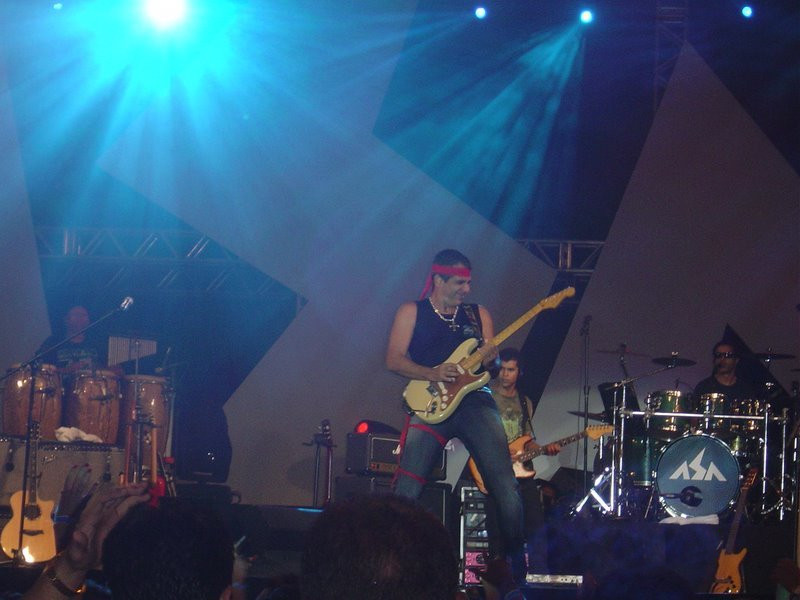
- Durval Lélys, singer and main lyricist

Background information
- Origin: Salvador, BA, Brazil
- Genres: Axé
- Years active: 1987–2014
- Labels: Universal Music; Sony BMG; Som Livre
- Members: Durval Lélys (vocals/electric guitar); Radi Santos Queiroz (drums); Ricardo Ferraro "Rambo" (keyboard); Ubajara Carvalho (percussion)
- Website: www.asadeaguia.net

Asa de Águia was a Brazilian axé band from Salvador. It has been on top of the Brazilian charts since its inception. The band was one of the main acts in the Carnival of Salvador, which according to the Guinness Book is the biggest outdoor party in the world. The band has sold more than five million records worldwide.

== Discography ==
- 1988 – Asa de Águia (RGE)
- 1990 – Qual é? (Musicolor)
- 1991 – Com Amor (Continental)
- 1992 – Se Ligue (Continental)
- 1993 – Cocobambu (Sony Music)
- 1994 – Ao Vivo (Sony Music / Som Livre)
- 1994 – Sereia (Sony Music)
- 1995 – A Lenda (Sony Music)
- 1996 – Kriptonita (Sony Music)
- 1997 – Tá Reclamando de Quê? (Sony Music)
- 1998 – Na Veia (Sony Music)
- 1999 – E o Mundo não se Acabou (BMG)
- 2000 – Asa (BMG)
- 2001 – Reino da Folia (Cocobambu Records / Abril Music)
- 2002 – Trivela Brasil (Cocobambu Records / Abril Music)
- 2003 – Abalou (Cocobambu Records)
- 2004 – Sou Asa (Cocobambu Records)
- 2006 – Ao Vivo (Cocobambu Records / Som Livre)
- 2008 – Turnê Comemorativa 20 Anos – Ao Vivo (Cocobambu Records / Som Livre)
- 2010 – Vale Night (Cocobambu Records)
- 2011 – Reiciclável (Cocobambu Records)
- 2012 – Asa no Trio – Ao Vivo no Carnatal (Cocobambu Records)
