= Carla Visi =

Brazilian singer and songwriter

- Born: August 30, 1970 (age 54); Salvador, Bahia, Brazil
- Genres: Axé and MPB
- Formerly of: Companhia Clic; Cheiro de Amor

Carla Visi (born August 30, 1970 in Salvador, Bahia, Brazil) is a Brazilian axé and MPB singer, songwriter, and occasional actress and television show host. She is one of the most popular and best-selling Brazilian female singer of the present, with four albums released with Cheiro de Amor, and three more albums in her solo career. Carla is most often recognized by her powerful voice, charisma and live performances. Her music is also popular in Portugal and Japan.

Carla started her career as a soloist in bars. In 1990, she was invited to replace Daniela Mercury in Companhia Clic, a band from Bahia which has great success at the time. In 1991 she recorded her first album, Companhia Clic III, and in 1993 the second one Cia Clic.

Subsequently, she left the band as she was invited to take the lead vocals in Cheiro de Amor and her career took off after the first album recorded with Carla performing vocals, É Demais Meu Rei (1996), was released. In 1997, the live album Cheiro de Amor Ao Vivo was released, achieving sales of 1.5m. The next album, Me Chama was recorded by the band in 1998. By the 1999 she decided to start a solo career so recorded her last album with Cheiro de Amor (another live one) called Cheiro em Festa.

== Discography ==
Albums with Companhia Clic:

- 1991: Companhia Clic III
- 1993: Cia Clic

Albums with Cheiro de Amor:

- 1996: É Demais Meu Rei
- 1997: Cheiro de Amor Ao Vivo
- 1998: Me Chama

Solo albums:

- 2001 – Carla visita Gilberto Gil
- Carla Visi Por todo canto
