= Saulo Fernandes =

- Born: Saulo Jorge Fernandes Navarro de Oliveira; September 9, 1977 (age 48); Barreiras, Bahia
- Genres: Axé
- Occupation: Singer-songwriter
- Instruments: Vocals, guitar
- Years active: 1993–present

Saulo Jorge Fernandes Navarro de Oliveira (born September 9, 1977) is a Brazilian Axé singer. Before becoming the lead singer of Banda Eva (Eva Band) in March 2002, Saulo was the lead singer of the Banda Chica Fé (Chica Fé Band). In 2013 he left Banda Eva to pursue a solo career.

== Career ==
Saulo Fernandes was born in the city of Barreiras (BA) on September 9, 1977, and became interested in music still small, the influence of family. His first experience in Trio Elétrico was not in Bahia.

At 18, Saulo was living in Vitória (ES) and began his musical career singing in the carnivals in town. Backing to Bahia in 1996 mounted to Banda Chica Fé and won the singer revelation of the Carnival of 2001.

In March 2002, Saulo received an invitation to head Banda Eva, a move which ended a hegemony of almost 10 years, when only women sang in the band. In 2003, he won another award, for best singer in the Carnival, now as lead singer of Eva. In 2013, he left Banda Eva to start a solo career.

== Awards ==
- Best Singer Revelation – Carnival 2002
- Best Singer – Carnival 2003
- Best Singer Revelation – Domingão do Faustão – Melhores do Ano 2007 (Best of the year 2007)
- Best Singer (Trophy Band Folia)- Carnival 2008
- Best Singer – Carnatal 2008
- Best Singer – Band Folia 2009

== Discography ==
- Lugar da Alegria (2009)
- A casa Amarela (project with Ivete Sangalo – CD Children) (2008)
- Veja alto, ouça colorido (2007)
- EVA 25 Anos (2005)
- É do EVA
- Pra Valer
- Querer (Chica Fé)
