= Ivete Sangalo =

Brazilian singer-songwriter (born 1972)

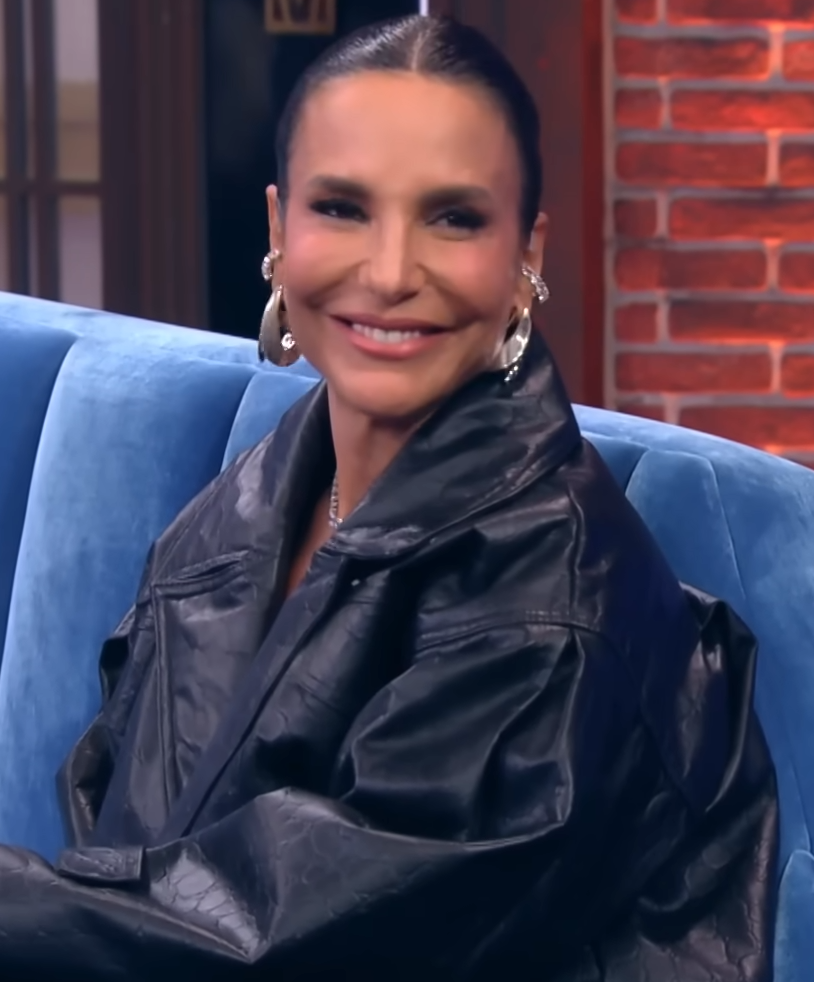
- Sangalo in July 2024
- Born: Ivete Maria Dias de Sangalo; 27 May 1972 (age 54); Juazeiro, Bahia, Brazil
- Other names: Queen of Brazil; Veveta; President of Bahia
- Occupations: Singer-songwriter; television personality; actress
- Years active: 1992–present
- Spouses: Davi Moraes (m. 2002; div. 2004); Daniel Cady (m. 2011; div. 2025)
- Children: 3
- Musical career
- Genres: Axé; reggae; pop; funk; pagode baiano; lambada
- Instruments: Vocals; guitar; drums; piano; percussion
- Labels: Sony Music (1993–1994); Universal Music (1994–present)
- Website: www.ivetesangalo.com.br

Ivete Maria Dias de Sangalo Cady (Brazilian Portuguese: [iˈvɛtʃi sɐ̃ˈɡalu]; née Dias de Sangalo; born 27 May 1972) is a Brazilian singer, actress, and television personality. Referred to as the "Queen of Brazil", her contributions to music have made her one of the most celebrated entertainers of the late 21st century in the country. Sangalo is noted for her powerful contralto voice, charisma and live performances. Her music is also popular in Portugal. She rose to fame in the mid-90s as the lead vocalist of the axé music band Banda Eva, who have sold over 5 million records. After leaving the group in 1999, Sangalo released the successful self-titled debut album Ivete Sangalo.

Some of its singles, "Se Eu Não Te Amasse Tanto Assim", "Festa" and "Sorte Grande" became her most popular signature songs. With "Macetando" (2024), she became the first Brazilian artist from the 90s to top the charts of Spotify Brazil. In 2007, Sangalo released Multishow ao Vivo: Ivete no Maracanã, which became one of the best-selling video albums worldwide. Her concert tour Tour Madison (2011–2012), is the all-time highest-grossing tour for a female Brazilian artist. Throughout her career, Sangalo has sold 20 million albums and won 4 Latin Grammy Awards, making her one of the best-selling female artists in Latin music.

== Life and career ==
=== Beginnings, Banda Eva and early solo career ===
Ivete Sangalo was born in Juazeiro, Bahia, where she spent her childhood. Her grandfather was born in Spain. She started her singing career in events at school and then started singing at bars. She started to receive attention and signed with Sony Music. In 1993, Sony decided to reform the Axé group Banda Eva and she was chosen as the lead singer. Her live album with the band, Banda Eva Ao Vivo, was their best-selling album, selling over a million copies. In 1997 she started a solo career and in 1999 she released her first album. With many upbeat Bahian rhythms and axé, the album received gold and platinum certification. The following year she released, Beat Beleza, which also achieved platinum status.

In 2000 she released the album Festa, whose title track was another success. The single was very popular, and the album got platinum certification. "Festa" was her biggest single up to that point and the video received huge airplay. "Festa" was the most popular song of 2001 in Brazil. Its music video featured 20 cameo appearances by Brazilian celebrities. In 2002, she released the album Se Eu Não te Amasse Tanto Assim (If I Didn't Love You As Much), titled after her big hit that reached the first position in the singles chart. The album, which features a duet with American singer Brian McKnight, didn't sell as much as her previous albums, but was still a hit. Following Se Eu Não te Amasse Tanto Assim, she released Clube Carnavalesco Innocentes Em Progresso in 2003. It was the lowest-selling solo album of her career but it still managed to receive gold certification.

=== 2003–2008: Career Progression ===
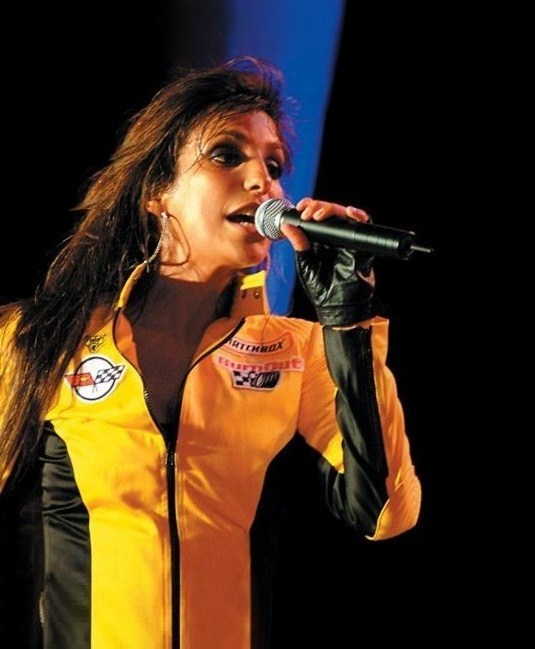
Sangalo in 2004.

MTV Ao Vivo Ivete Sangalo MTV Live: Ivete Sangalo (2004), was a live album that included her biggest hits, a few of which were released on previous live albums, and some Banda Eva hits. The album garnered huge sales, most of them due to the single "Sorte Grande", which was renamed "Poeira" by the public and became a big hit at parties, on the radio and also at soccer stadiums (where it was used to cheer on the teams). The song received heavy airplay in Brazil and was also included in the soundtrack of the Fifa 2005 videogame. The album was certified diamond and was the second best-selling album of 2004 in Brazil. The DVD, which included the concert held at the Fonte Nova stadium, was certified 3x Diamond, sold over 600,000 copies, and is the best-selling musical DVD in Brazil of all time (and the best-selling musical DVD in the world in the second half of 2005).

In 2005, Sangalo was called by Billboard: Brazil's Queen of Song, due to the release of her first live DVD "MTV Ao Vivo" released at that time, the album made references to Carmen Miranda in one of its tracks, Miranda lived in the United States during the first half of the 20th century and epitomized Latin sensuality through her numerous Hollywood films. Asked if she intends to repeat Miranda's success, Sangalo said, "It would be too pretentious for me to even dream about that parallel. But I would like to follow [in] the steps of Tom Jobim and Caetano Veloso. They are Brazilian artists who are respected all around the world. For me, that will be more difficult to achieve, because I want to be known for the kind of music I sing-[which] doesn't fit the Brazilian standards foreign audiences are used to. I want people to [respect] my musical style."

Her 2005 album, As Supernovas, received triple platinum certification shortly after its release. The album was less upbeat than her previous ones and included some songs with a 1970s touch, with the big influence of Brazilian singer Ed Motta. She also included the hit "Soy Loco por ti America", a Gilberto Gil song. Sangalo's cover would become the theme song of TV Globo's soap opera América, and thanks to the tie-in, the song became very popular. "Quando a Chuva Passar" was notable for being nominated at the Latin Grammy Awards, an uncommon feature for a non-Spanish-speaking singer. As Supernovas also received diamond certification which consolidated her as the biggest female solo singer in Brazil.

Due to her remarkable appearances on TV, TV Globo, the biggest Brazilian TV station, invited her to host the TV show Estação Globo, which aires about six episodes every year in late December/early January.

On December 16, 2006, she performed in the Maracanã in Rio de Janeiro, where Paul McCartney, Rolling Stones, Kiss, Police, Rush, RBD, and Madonna also performed. She was the first Brazilian act to perform in this stadium since pop phenomenon Sandy & Junior in 2002. The concert was released as a DVD in May 2007. While her last live DVD was an MTV Live, this new one was broadcast by Multishow.

Her biggest career hits are "Sorte Grande" and "Festa". Sangalo has sold more than 7,000,000 CDs and more than 1,500,000 DVDs.

According to O Globo, Sangalo asks for R$240,000 (US$120,000 per concert) and a percentage of tickets sale, which makes her final paycheck R$350,000 ($275,000), the second highest-paid act in Brazil. (Roberto Carlos is the most expensive, asking R$700,000 per concert). For special concerts, the price may reach R$2 million ($1 million).

Her parallel businesses include performances at her "blocos" at Salvador carnival and other performances at trio elétrico in off-season carnivals. Her sponsorship deals include such companies as Grendene, Koleston, Danone, Arisco, Panasonic, Bradesco, and Nova Schin beer.

Her Ao Vivo no Maracanã DVD sold 555,000 copies, making it the best-selling musical DVD of the year in Brazil and the best-selling musical DVD overall in 2007 for Universal Records internationally. In October 2008, she released a children's album with Saulo Fernandes, lead-singer of Banda Eva.

=== 2009–2011: Pode Entrar, motherhood, US tour ===
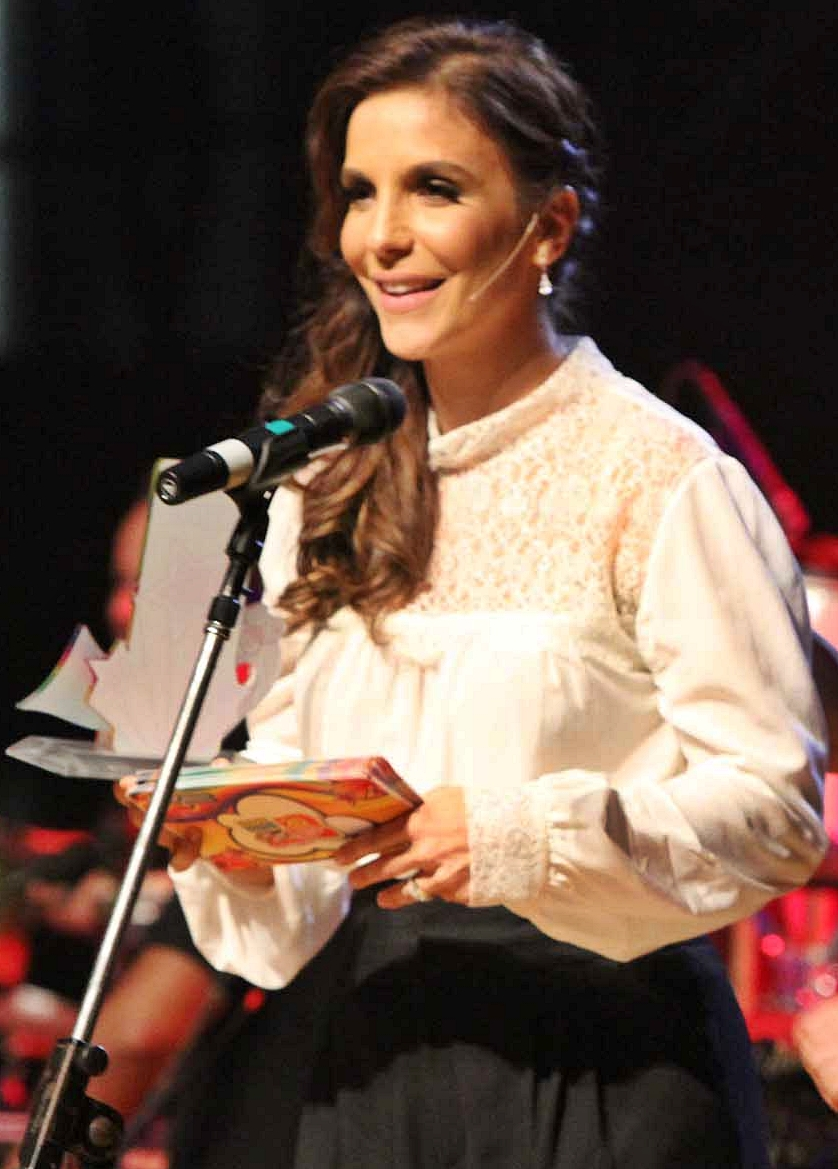
Sangalo in 2011.

In June 2009, the singer released her tenth studio album, Pode Entrar, recorded in a studio set up at her home, in Salvador. The project showed Sangalo in a more intimate way, entertaining friends at her house and included guests appearances by other artists in an unprecedented way. Pode Entrar was also released as a DVD and includes guest stars Maria Bethânia, Carlinhos Brown, Lulu Santos and Marcelo Camelo. The album includes the huge summer hits Cadê Dalila, elected the "song of the Salvador carnival" in 2009, and Na Base do Beijo, which had heavy airplay in the beginning of 2010. Both of them peaked No. 1 on the Brazilian charts. There's also Agora Eu Já Sei, a smash romantic hit that charted at No. 2 in the winter of 2009.

On September 8, 2009, it was confirmed that Sangalo would be opening for R&B singer-songwriter Beyoncé Knowles' on her I Am... Tour in Brazil, in São Paulo and Salvador, Bahia. These shows took place in February 2010.

On November 17, 2009, Sangalo released a clothing collection in collaboration with Lojas Riachuelo, the third biggest retail chain in Brazil.

In early 2010, she was one of the finalists in the "Music" category of the year Shorty Awards for the best Twitter users.

In April 2010, a new DVD, "Ivete Sangalo Duetos" ("Ivete Sangalo Duets" in English), was released, with a total of 19 performances with other artists, all of them previously released in her own discography or in the discography of the other artists with whom she sings. This DVD include performances with Alejandro Sanz, Alexandre Pires, Roberto Carlos, Gilberto Gil, Jorge Ben Jor, Zezé Di Camargo & Luciano, among other artists, and managed to peak at No. 1 on Brazilian charts by the second week of May 2010.

She was invited by TAM Airlines, which is now one of her sponsors, to perform at a private show to commemorate the airline joining Star Alliance. This pocket show took place at the foot of the Pão de Açúcar, in Rio de Janeiro, on May 13, 2010, and was broadcast by Terra Networks.

In Portugal, she was the only artist to perform at all four editions of Rock in Rio festival in Lisbon. Her debut in the country in 2004 made her famous there. In the 2010 edition of the festival, she was one of the most anticipated attractions on the opening night of May 21, and performed to an audience of more than eighty thousand people.

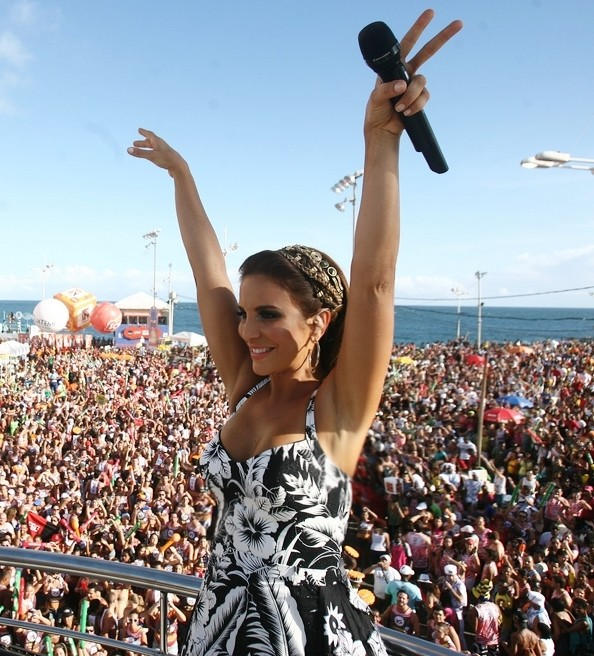
Sangalo in the Bahian Carnival, in 2012.

On September 4, 2010, Sangalo star performed at Madison Square Garden in New York City, where she recorded her third live DVD. There were four guest stars at this sold-out show. They were Nelly Furtado, Seu Jorge, Juanes and Diego Torres. Newspapers such as New York Times and New York Post published positive reviews of the show. The singer also performed at the American Airlines Arena in Miami on August 28, at the DCU Center in Worcester on September 1 and at the Brazilian Day party in Toronto on September 6. This was her 2010 North American mini tour.

Brazilian media published in the beginning of September 2010 that Ivete Sangalo would go on tour in Brazil with Shakira in 2011. Later, it was discovered that the agreement would be for her to perform at Shakira's "The Pop Festival" shows. The contract was signed on Saturday, September 4, in New York, the same day of her show on Madison Square Garden. That same week, Sangalo confirmed she quietly married nutritionist Daniel Cady, father of her son Marcelo, after dating for two years.

On Saturday, September 11, the singer made an appearance at Dave Matthews Band's show in Dallas, Texas, where she performed the song "You And Me" with the band, in a Portuguese-English version. This performance was also recorded and featured on her live DVD.

The singer made an appearance at Gigi D'Alessio's show in Rome on Tuesday, September 21. They performed an Italian version of her hit "Se eu não te amasse tanto assim" and "Easy", a Lionel Richie cover that had been previously performed at the Madison Square Garden and the DCU Center.

The "Multishow ao Vivo: Ivete Sangalo no Madison Square Garden" record was released on December 7, after being broadcast on December 5 by Brazilian cable TV channel Multishow. On launch day on December 7, the disc had sold over 300,000 copies in its only pre-sale, which earned it a certification of a Triple Platinum and Gold Record by ABPD. At the end of January, the DVD was leading the Brazilian charts for the seventh consecutive week since its debut. Its first single "Acelera Aê (Noite do bem)" also managed to peak at No. 1 on the Brazilian charts and "Desejo de Amar" was chosen to be the 2011 Carnival song.

In 2010, Ivete Sangalo appeared as a celebrity judge for Avon Voices, Avon's first ever global, online singing talent search for women and songwriting competition for men and women.

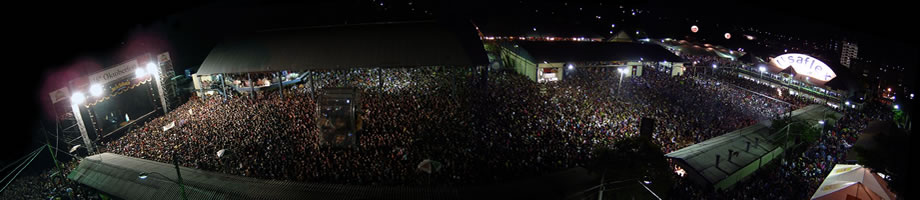
Performance of Ivete Sangalo at the Brazilian Oktoberfest of Blumenau.

=== 2012–present: Real Fantasia ===
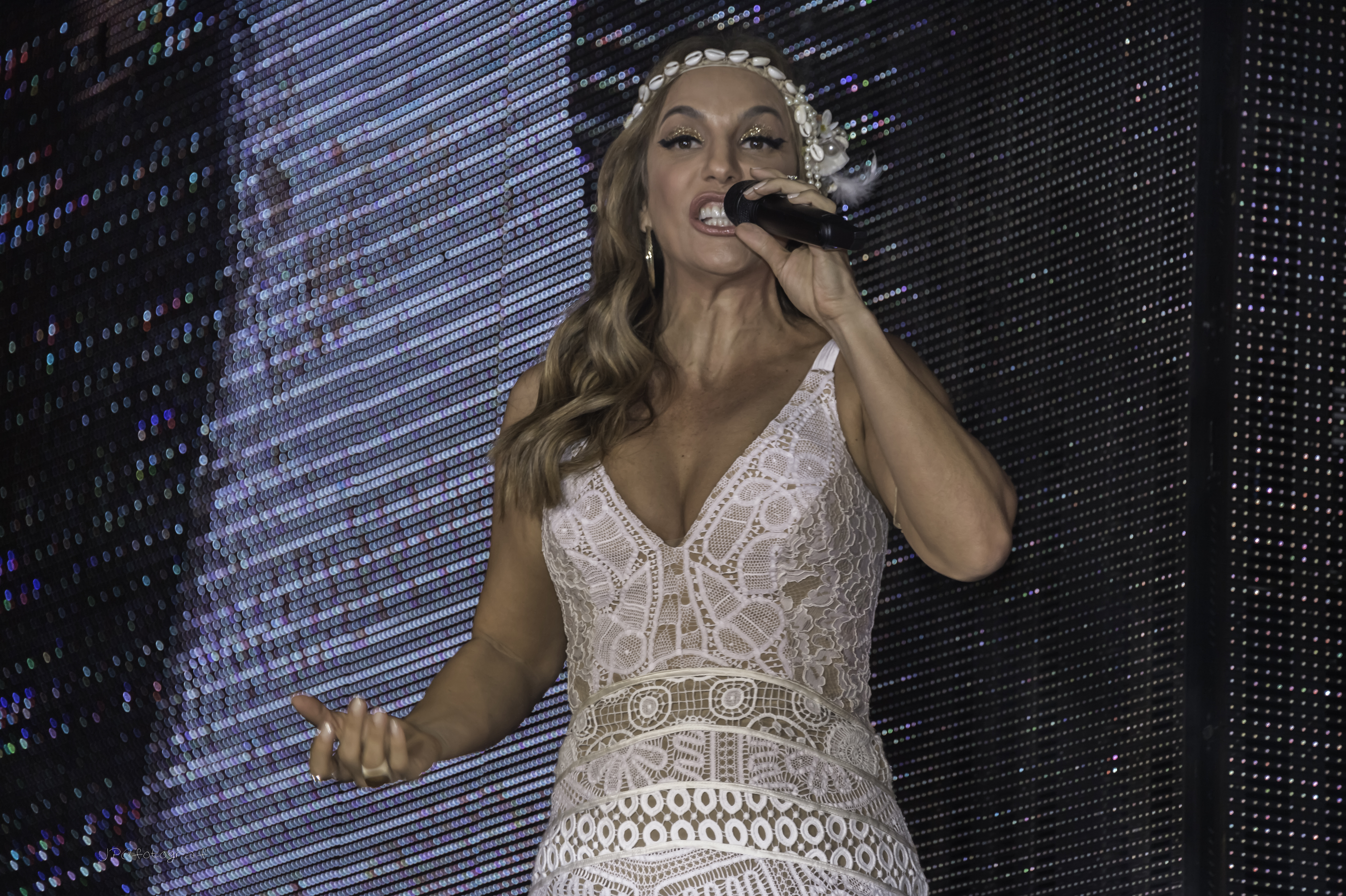
Sangalo in concert in 2016.

The art director who works with Madonna, Giovanni Bianco, put his holiday in Sardinia (Italy) on hold to work on the graphic design for Sangalo's eighth studio album, Real Fantasia, released in October 2012.

In 2015, Sangalo performed at the music festival Rock in Rio USA in Las Vegas.

The cultural program of the 2016 Summer Paralympics closing ceremony was structured as a concert, being headlined by Ivete Sangalo and Gaby Amarantos, joined by Vanessa da Mata, Céu, Saulo Fernandes, Saulo Laucas, Sepultura guitarist Andreas Kisser, Armandinho, Jonathan Bastos, the groups Nação Zumbi and Dream Team do Passinho, and the funk singer Nego do Borel joined by special guest Calum Scott who called her the "Brazilian Beyoncé" – a way to explain to the UK public the grandeur of Bahia in Brazil. "I can barely explain how honoured I am to be on this stage, helping to close one of the greatest and most inspiring events, along with the Brazilian Beyoncé. It was amazing", said the singer to the British newspaper "Hull Daily Mail". Ivete not only caught the attention of the British singer – the international press also highlighted the Bahian performance. The CNN site called the singer a "megastar". But The Guardian newspaper defined Ivete as 'the most influential woman in Brazil'. Something that drew the attention of the international press was that Ivete, has over 12 million followers on Instagram, for example.

She performed the theme song for the Latin American Spanish and Brazilian Portuguese dubs of the 2017 DuckTales series.

== Discography ==
- Ivete Sangalo (1999)
- Beat Beleza (2000)
- Festa (2002)
- Clube Carnavalesco Inocentes em Progresso (2003)
- MTV Ao Vivo – Ivete Sangalo (2004)
- As Super Novas (2005)
- Multishow ao Vivo: Ivete no Maracanã (2007)
- Veveta e Saulinho – A Casa Amarela (2008)
- Pode Entrar: Multishow Registro (2009)
- Multishow ao Vivo: Ivete Sangalo no Madison Square Garden (2010)
- Ivete, Gil e Caetano (2012)
- Real Fantasia (2012)
- Multishow ao Vivo: Ivete Sangalo 20 Anos (2014)
- Viva Tim Maia! (2015)
- Acústico em Trancoso (2016)
- Live Experience (2019)
- Onda Boa com Ivete (2022)

== Filmography ==
Film
Year	Film	Role	Notes
1998	Simão, o Fantasma Trapalhão	Estrela	
2006	Xuxa Gêmeas	Alice	
2012	Ivete Stellar e a Pedra da Luz	Voz (Ivete Stellar)	Trailer only
2013	Planes	Voz (Carolina Santos)	Brazilian and Latin American Spanish version
2017	Smurfs: The Lost Village	Voz (Smurf-Magnólia)	Brazilian version
Television
Year	Title	Role	Notes
1998	Planeta Xuxa	Eventual Host	
2000	Brava Gente	Rosália	Guest appearance
2001	Sítio do Picapau Amarelo	Cassia	Guest appearance
2005	Estação Globo	Host	2005–2009
2005	América	Herself	
2007	Paraíso Tropical	Herself	
2012	As Brasileiras	Raquel	TV Globo miniseries
2012	Gabriela	Maria Machadão	TV Globo Soap opera aired at 11 pm
2014	Superstar	Herself	TV Globo Airs on Sundays at 11 pm
2016	The Voice Kids	Herself	TV Globo Airs on Sundays at 1 pm
2021	The Masked Singer Brasil	Host	2021–present

== Notable Advertising spokesperson ==
- Summer's Eve
- Arisco
- Wella Koleston
- Grendha
- Nova Schin
- Higgfly
- Kopenhagen
- Sagres Beer
- Caboré
- Philips
- Maratá
- Iguatemi Salvador
- Riachuelo (Store)
- Colorama (Nail Polish)
- Fototica
- TAM Airlines
- Chevrolet
- Bombril
- Danone

== Awards and nominations ==
=== Latin Grammy Award ===
Year	Category	Title of Work	Result
2000	Best New Artist	Ivete Sangalo	Nominated
2000	Best Brazilian Contemporary Pop Album	Ivete Sangalo	Nominated
2001	Best Brazilian Contemporary Pop Album	Beat Beleza	Nominated
2002	Best Brazilian Contemporary Pop Album	"Festa"	Nominated
2004	Best Brazilian Contemporary Pop Album	Clube Carnavalesco Inocentes em Progresso	Nominated
2005	Best Brazilian Roots/Regional Album	MTV ao Vivo	Won
2006	Best Brazilian Contemporary Pop Album	As Super Novas	Nominated
2006	Best Brazilian Song	"Abalou"	Nominated
2007	Best Brazilian Contemporary Pop Album	Ivete no Maracanã	Nominated
2007	Best Long Form Music Video	Ivete no Maracanã	Nominated
2009	Best Latin Children's Album	A Casa Amarela	Nominated
2009	Best Brazilian Contemporary Pop Album	Pode Entrar	Nominated
2009	Best Long Form Music Video	Pode Entrar	Nominated
2009	Best Brazilian Song	"Agora Eu Já Sei"	Nominated
2011	Best Brazilian Song	"Acelera Aê"	Nominated
2011	Best Brazilian Contemporary Pop Album	Ivete Sangalo no Madison Square Garden	Nominated
2012	Record of the Year	"Atrás da Porta"	Nominated
2012	Album of the Year	Ivete, Gil e Caetano	Nominated
2012	Best MPB Album	Ivete, Gil e Caetano	Won
2012	Best Long Form Music Video	Ivete, Gil e Caetano	Nominated
2014	Best Brazilian Contemporary Pop Album	Multishow Ao Vivo: 20 Anos	Won
2021	Best Portuguese Language Roots Album	Arraiá da Veveta	Won

=== Multishow Brazilian Music Award ===
Year	Category	Title of Work	Result
1999	Best Singer	Ivete Sangalo	Won
1999	Best Song	"Se Eu Não Te Amasse Tanto Assim"	Nominated
2001	Best Song	"A Lua Que Eu Te Dei"	Won
2002	Best Singer	Ivete Sangalo	Nominated
2002	Best Song	"Festa"	Nominated
2003	Best Singer	Ivete Sangalo	Won
2003	Best Song	"Sorte Grande"	Nominated
2005	Best DVD	MTV ao Vivo	Won
2006	Best Concert	Ivete no Maracanã	Won
2007	Best Concert	Ivete no Maracanã	Won
2007	Best Album	Ivete no Maracanã	Nominated
2007	Best DVD	Ivete no Maracanã	Won
2008	Best Singer	Ivete Sangalo	Won
2008	Best Instrumentalist	Radamés Venâncio	Nominated
2009	TVZé	Vai Buscar Dalila	Won
2010	Best Singer	Ivete Sangalo	Nominated
2010	Best Concert	Turnê Mais	Won
2010	Best DVD	Pode Entrar	Nominated
2010	Best Clip	"Agora Eu Já Sei"	Nominated
2011	Best Singer	Ivete Sangalo	Nominated
2011	Best Concert	Ivete Sangalo no Madison Square Garden	Nominated
2011	Best DVD	Ivete Sangalo no Madison Square Garden	Won
2011	Best Song	"Química do Amor" (feat. Luan Santana)	Nominated
2012	Best Singer	Ivete Sangalo	Won
2012	Best Song	"Darte"	Nominated

Year	Award	Category	Result	Ref.
2020	Prêmio Multishow	Cantora do Ano	Pending	

=== Troféu Imprensa ===
Year	Category	Title of Work	Result
1999	Best Singer	Ivete Sangalo	Nominated
2000	Best Singer	Ivete Sangalo	Nominated
2001	Best Singer	Ivete Sangalo	Nominated
2002	Best Singer	Ivete Sangalo	Nominated
2003	Best Singer	Ivete Sangalo	Won
2004	Best Singer	Ivete Sangalo	Nominated
2005	Best Singer	Ivete Sangalo	Nominated
2007	Best Singer	Ivete Sangalo	Won
2008	Best Singer	Ivete Sangalo	Won
2009	Best Singer	Ivete Sangalo	Nominated
2010	Best Singer	Ivete Sangalo	Won
2011	Best Singer	Ivete Sangalo	Won
2012	Best Singer	Ivete Sangalo	Nominated

=== Melhores do Ano ===
Year	Category	Title of Work	Result
2000	Best Singer	Ivete Sangalo	Won
2001	Best Singer	Ivete Sangalo	Nominated
2002	Best Song	"Festa"	Won
2003	Best Singer	Ivete Sangalo	Won
2004	Best Singer	Ivete Sangalo	Won
2004	Best Song	"Sorte Grande"	Won
2005	Best Singer	Ivete Sangalo	Nominated
2006	Best Singer	Ivete Sangalo	Won
2006	Best Song	"Quando a Chuva Passar"	Won
2007	Best Singer	Ivete Sangalo	Won
2008	Best Singer	Ivete Sangalo	Won
2009	Best Singer	Ivete Sangalo	Won
2010	Best Singer	Ivete Sangalo	Nominated
2011	Best Singer	Ivete Sangalo	Nominated
2013	Best Singer	Ivete Sangalo	Won
2014	Best Singer	Ivete Sangalo	Nominated
2015	Best Singer	Ivete Sangalo	Nominated
2016	Best Singer	Ivete Sangalo	Nominated
2017	Best Singer	Ivete Sangalo	Won

== See also ==
- List of best-selling Latin music artists
