= Netinho (singer) =

Brazilian singer (1966–2026)

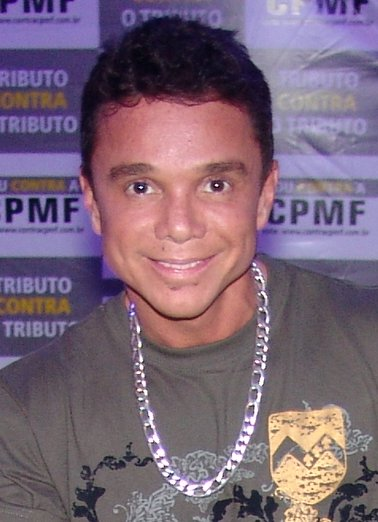
- Netinho in 2007

Background information
- Born: Ernesto de Souza Andrade Júnior; July 12, 1966; Santo Antônio de Jesus, Bahia, Brazil
- Died: October 13, 2026 (aged 60) Salvador, Bahia, Brazil
- Genres: Axé Music and Samba reggae
- Occupations: Singer-songwriter, businessman
- Instruments: Voice, classical guitar, guitar
- Years active: 1988–2026
- Website: www.netinho.com.br

Ernesto de Souza Andrade Júnior (July 12, 1966 – October 13, 2026), better known as Netinho, was a Brazilian singer and composer known for his work as a solo artist and with Banda Beijo.

== Early life ==
Ernesto de Souza Andrade Júnior was born in Santo Antônio de Jesus, Bahia, Brazil on July 12, 1966. After the death of his father in the mid-1970s, the family moved to Salvador. His mother gave him his first guitar at age 14 and he began playing professionally in local bars at age 16 while studying civil engineering at the Catholic University of Salvador.

== Career ==
Netinho initially played Brazilian popular music and Bossa Nova but later discovered Carnival. In 1988, he joined Banda Beijo as a vocalist and debuted on the local Carnival circuit. Their first big hit came in 1988 with the single "Beijo na Boca." Shortly after, they appeared on the eighth episode of the new Rede Globo show Domingão do Faustão. In 1990, they toured Italy in an electric trio during the FIFA World Cup; afterwards, Netinho set off on a mini solo tour around the country. The band's third album in 1990, called Eu Quero Beijo, was released by BMG; its release party, held on the roof of Barra Shopping, reportedly drew 40,000 attendees. In 1991, PolyGram released their next album, Badameiro.

The band released Happened in 1992, followed by Aconteceu, Axé Music in 1993, Netinho's last album with Banda Beijo. Netinho's first solo CD, Um Beijo pra Você was also released that year, with his cover of Paulinho Nogueira's "Menina" which not only became a major hit but also appeared as Amanda's theme on the Globo TV soap opera Tropicaliente. The album became his first platinum record in Brazil and first gold record in Chile.

In 1994, he released Nada Vai Nos Separar and the song "Como" became Sheila's theme on História de Amor. Netinho - Ao Vivo!, his next album, was mastered at Bernie Grundman's studio in Los Angeles and reached diamond status, with more than 1.5 million copies sold. The song "Caso Sério," as well as a cover of Caetano Veloso's "Você É Linda" from Alguém Cantando Caetano, were used in Malhação in 1996. His next album, Me Leva, went platinum and the song "Milla" continues to be one of Netinho's most popular songs. It was used on Corpo Dourado in 1998 and in Segundo Sol in 2018. "Pra Te Ter Aqui" was used as the theme song of Corpo Dourado and he appeared in chapter 52 of the show on March 17, 1998.

He returned to Brazil in 1998 to record Rádio Brasil with PolyGram, followed by Clareou, which featured a mix of Phil Collins' "Against All Odds", which became the song "Forever I Will Love You." "'O surdato 'nnammurato" appeared on the soundtrack of Terra Nostra. His song "Indecisão" appeared in Andando nas Nuvens. The same year, Netinho relaunched Banda Beijo, this time with singer Gilmelândia. He appeared on the 1999 compilation album A Arca dos Bichos by Captain Music. As the market for axé diminished in the late 1990s and early 2000s, Netinho moved to Portugal, where he found more success. In 2000, he took his electric trio to Lisbon to celebrate the 500th anniversary of Brazil. He performed "Química Perfeita" in Spanish with Ivete Sangalo at a Carnival at Parque das Nações in front of 80,000 people. The song appeared on As Filhas da Mãe. The following year, Netinho organized Portugal's first micareta, drawing more than 200,000 people in just one weekend.

In 2002, he performed at the Portugal Elétrico Festival and recorded the album Zuêra with Universal Music, which reimagined MPB songs as dance-pop. Netinho took a year away from music to focus on himself and his family and returned the following year with what would become his next CD, Outra Versão. He began recording his first DVD, featuring other artists like Ivete Sangalo and Ilê Aiyê. His 2008 album Minha Praia was released by Som Livre and featured "Tá Bom," a collaboration with Carlinhos Brown, and a cover of Fábio Junior's "Caça e Caçador." He also released "Na Capoeira" for Carnival. In 2009, he celebrated the 20th anniversary of his career, appeared on Domingão do Faustão, and recorded his next CD/DVD Netinho and Caixa Mágica at the Hotel Parque dos Coqueiros in Aracaju along with Banda Eva's Saulo Fernandes, Cheiro de Amor's Alinne Rosa, Tomate, D'Black, and Jorge Vercillo (who participated virtually). In 2009 and 2010, he released two work songs, "Extrapolou" and "Apertadinho," as well as their music videos.

Netinho was named a Citizen Sergipano of Aracaju in 1998 and was nominated for a Latin Grammy for Best Portuguese Language Roots Album in 2009 for his album Minha Praia.

== Personal life ==
Between 1997 and 2003, Netinho was married to journalist Mariana Trindade, with whom he had a daughter in 2000. In a 2008 interview with Quem, Netinho openly identified as bisexual. In 2020, he criticized the LGBT movement, comparing the impact of LGBT inclusion in the Bahian Carnival to Sodom and Gomorrah. He added that "if these LGBT people didn't live according to the fiofó [anus], because they live like that, thinking about the fiofó, they would be running Brazil today along with Jair, supporting Jair, it would be wonderful." He shared that he decided to abstain from sex starting in 2016 and that his bisexuality had been "resolved." However, in a 2019 Facebook post condemning the same-sex kiss in Avengers: The Children's Crusade #9, he wrote: "I'm a man, bisexual, father, family, conservative, honest, dignified, sincere, fulfilled and very happy. No more." In 2017, he became a vegan.

Netinho became a conservative in 2016 and was a strong supporter of former president of Brazil Jair Bolsonaro. In 2020, he created the Aliados Brasil Conservador (lit: Conservatives Brazilian Allies) association to support him. He also ran for federal deputy of Bahia in the 2022 election, which he did from the Liberal Party platform. In January 2023, Clube de Aracaju cancelled a scheduled performance by Netinho following controversy over a social media post in which he expressed support for demonstrators associated with the events of 8 January in Brasília. His remarks drew criticism amid the political tensions surrounding the events. Netinho denied having encouraged vandalism or terrorism, stating that his public positions had consistently supported family, peace and love. He subsequently criticised the cancellation of his performance, citing damage to his reputation and financial losses.

In 2018, the writers of the song "Milla," Manno Góes and Tuca Fernandes, criticized Netinho for using the song at pro-Bolsonaro rallies. Góes sought an injunction requiring Carla Zambelli to remove the video of Netinho's performance of the song on grounds of unauthorized use of the song for political purposes. Netinho sued Góes in return for "abusive conduct" and "offensive statements," requesting that posts calling him anti-democratic, a criminal, and a "coup plotter" be removed.

=== Health and death ===
Netinho was admitted to the hospital on April 24, 2013, after a biopsy revealed adenomas in his liver. He suffered a series of strokes, three of which happened in the same week, that confined him to Hospital Sírio-Libanês for four months. During that time, he spent three months in an induced coma and also temporarily lost his voice, memory, and the ability to move. While there, he met Maria, former president Lula's sister, who was also in the hospital. He was readmitted in 2014 for six months for depression and suicidal ideation. He appeared on Domingão do Faustão in 2014 to discuss this. He had a cerebral shunt removed in 2015, followed by a combined four cardiac shunts installed in 2015 and 2016. He was admitted to the hospital in 2019 after his annual checkup to have heart surgery for a small fatty plaque on his heart and underwent surgery for another cardiac shunt.

In 2017, Netinho posted on Instagram about how he was prescribed anabolic androgenic steroids for testosterone deficiency to cure his varicocele in 2010 or 2011, and attributed his lengthy illnesses to its use. He publicly condemned treatment he received from Dr. Mohamad Barakat and said he would be writing a book about the malpractice. Barakat sued him for moral damages in 2016 after the post. Barakat lost the case after the judge determined Netinho's right to share facts about his own medical experiences.

Netinho died from complications related to non-Hodgkin lymphoma at Hospital Aliança Star in Salvador, Bahia, on October 13, 2026, at the age of 60.

== Discography ==
=== Studio albums ===
- Um Beijo Pra Você (1993)
- Nada Vai Nos Separar (1994)
- Netinho (1995)
- Me Leva (1997)
- Rádio Brasil (1998)
- Clareou (1999)
- Corpo & Cabeça (2000)
- Outra Versão (2005)
- Minha Praia (2008)
- Uma Noite no Forró Elétrico (2012)
- Beats, Baladas & Balanços (2014)

=== Live albums ===
- Netinho ao Vivo! (1996)
- Terra Carnavális (2001)
- Por Inteiro (2006)
- Netinho e a Caixa Mágica (2010)
