= Chiclete com Banana =

Brazilian axé band

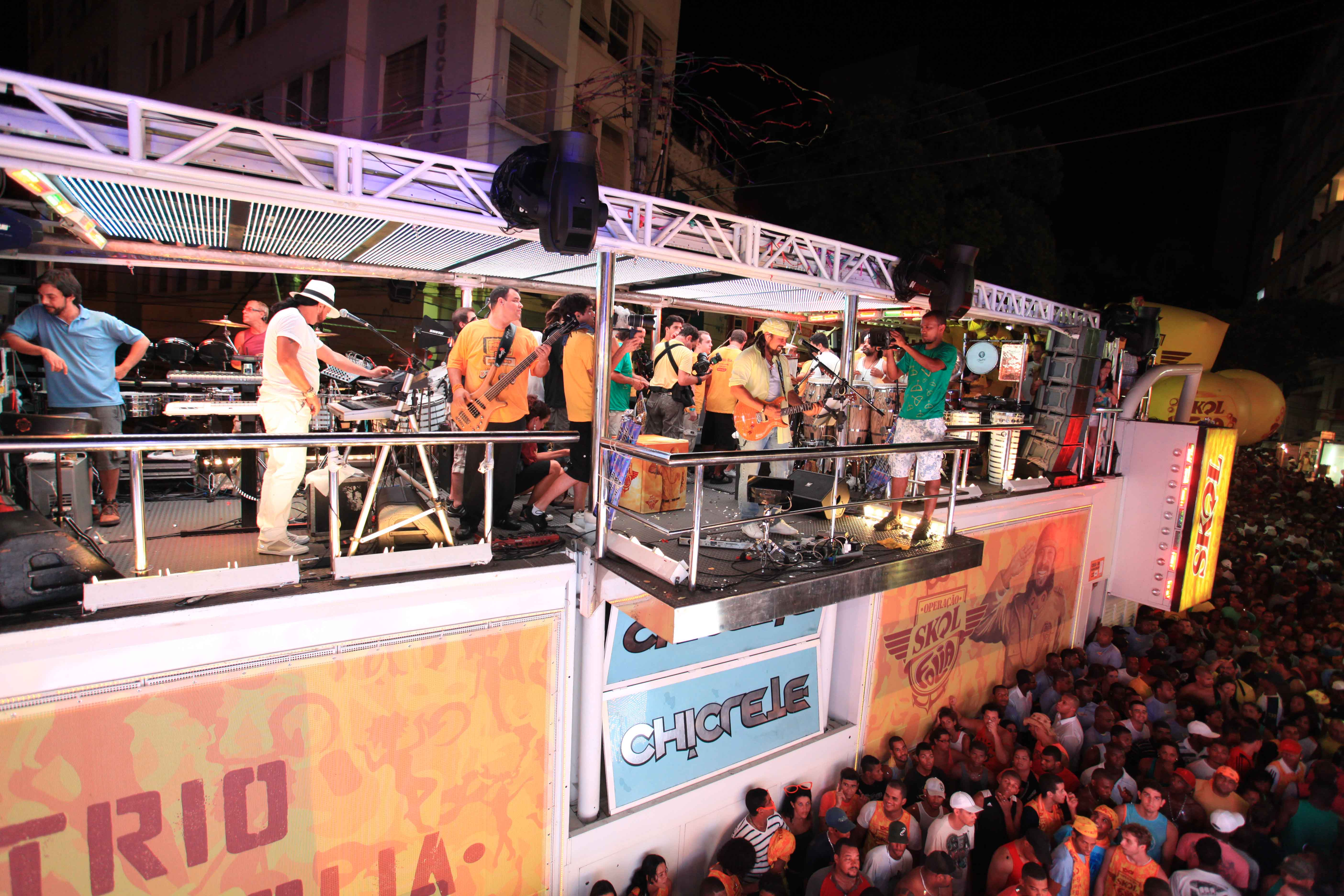
- Chiclete com banana, Salvador Bahia, in Carnaval 2012.

Background information
- Origin: Salvador, Bahia, Brazil
- Genres: Axé
- Occupation: Band
- Years active: 1980–present
- Labels: Bacarolla; Warner Music; BMG; Sony BMG Music Entertainment; Sony Music Entertainment
- Members: Waltinho Cruz; Wado Marques; Denny Urpia; Shanon Gramacho; Diego Gramacho; Khill
- Past members: Missinho Amorim; Rubinho Gramacho; Cacik Jonne; Rey Gramacho; Bell Marques; Walmar Paim; Flavinho Drums; Lelo Lobão; Rafa Chaves
- Website: www.chicletecombanana.com.br

Chiclete com Banana (Portuguese for "chewing gum with banana") is a Brazilian axé music band, formed in 1980 by Missinho Amorim (vocals and guitar), Bell Marques (bass), Cacik Jonne (guitar), Rey Gramacho (drums), Waltinho Cruz (percussion), Deny Urpia (percussion), and Rubinho Gramacho (percussion). Initially, the band performed in bars and university parties, playing covers of international rock and pop hits. The transition to a repertoire with carnival influences and Bahian rhythms occurred in the late 1980s, consolidating the style that would come to be called axé. Their most famous album, Gritos de Guerra, released in 1987, sold one million copies.

The band is one of the main groups responsible for popularizing the Bahian carnival by organizing micaretas (out-of-season carnivals) throughout Brazil. The group maintains a fan base known as chicleteiros.

== History ==
=== 1979–80: Origins as a cover band ===
The band originated from a cover group called Scorpius, which performed at graduation parties and played English-language songs by international artists such as Rod Stewart, Paul McCartney, and Elton John. The original members included Bell Marques (guitar), Rey Gramacho (drums), Missinho, Rubinho Gramacho, Waltinho Magarão (percussion), and Wado Marques (keyboards). Denny Urpia and Cacik Jonne joined subsequently. In 1979, Bell Marques proposed that the group perform on a trio elétrico (a sound truck used in Brazilian carnival parades). In 1980, sound engineer Wilson Silva implemented a revolutionary modification by enclosing the sides of the trio with speakers and utilizing transistorized amplification equipment, allowing all musicians to perform on the truck's upper level. This innovation became the most significant transformation of the trio elétrico during the 1980s.

=== 1980–2001: Transition to axé, national success, and lineup changes ===
In 1981, the band adopted the name "Chiclete com Banana", coined by cartoonist Nildão to reflect their eclectic mixture of musical genres. Bell Marques subsequently switched to bass guitar. The debut album, Traz os Montes, was released that same year. In 1982, they released Estação das Cores, followed by Energia in 1983. During this period, the band performed for the "Traz a Massa" carnival bloc, which allowed their music to reach both popular and upper-class audiences.

From 1985 to 1989, the band performed with the bloc "Os Internacionais." Having acquired their own trio elétrico, they later decided to perform independently of carnival blocs, performing for the general public on the streets even without sponsorship, supported by their own production company, Mazana. In 1990, they signed a contract with the Camaleão bloc, where they remained until 2014.

In 1986, with the release of the album Gritos de Guerra, the band sold approximately one million copies and received triple platinum certification, marking the emergence of the dedicated fan base known as "chicleteiros". Until April 1986, the band consisted of eight members. Following the departures of Missinho and Rubinho Gramacho, the lineup was reduced to six members without replacement. Despite initial fan skepticism regarding Missinho's departure, the band continued to release successful studio and live albums, including Fé Brasileira, Tambores Urbanos, Classificados, Banana Coral, É Festa, Santo Protetor, Chiclete Na Caixa, Banana No Cacho, and Sou Chicleteiro.

=== 2001: Health issues and departure of Cacik Jonne ===
In 2001, guitarist Cacik Jonne experienced health issues during a performance and was diagnosed with cerebellar ataxia, a degenerative neurological disorder. Prior to diagnosis, he had already suffered from motor coordination problems and had adapted by using a double-neck guitar. Although initially considered a temporary absence, Jonne's departure was confirmed in June of the same year. He was honored at the following year's carnival when Bell Marques performed Queen's "I Want to Break Free". In 2002, Jonne filed a labor lawsuit and two civil suits against the band, seeking compensation for two decades of service; the case was ultimately dismissed by the Superior Labor Court. During the 2005 carnival, despite his deteriorated physical condition, Jonne organized a protest near the band's trio elétrico displaying a banner demanding unpaid rights.

=== 2002–2018: Second DVD, departure of Bell Marques, and entry of Rafa Marques ===
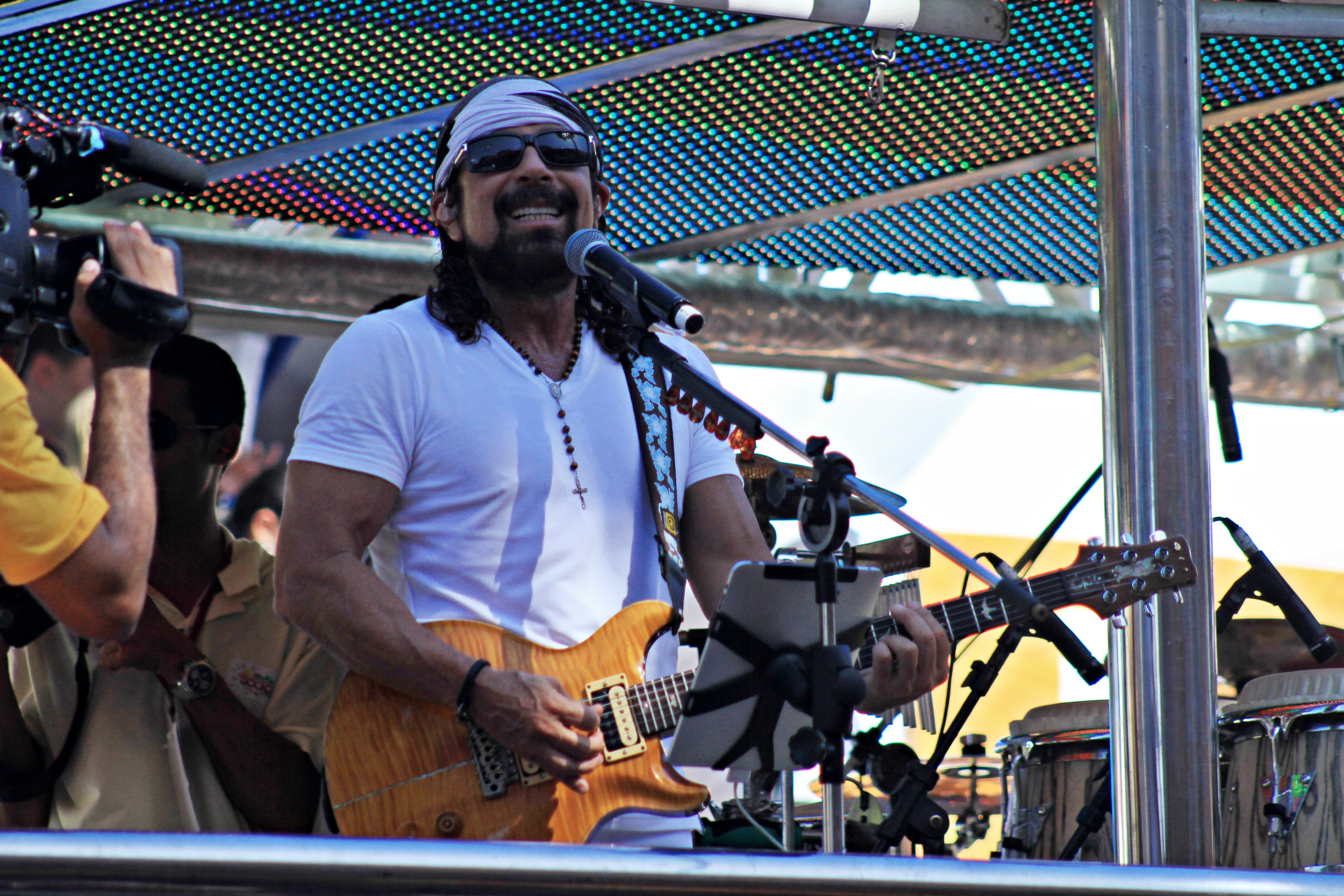
Bell Marques during a performance with Chiclete com Banana in 2011.

On November 1, 2008, the band recorded their second DVD in Salvador, gathering approximately 50,000 spectators at the Bahia capital's Exhibition Park. That same year, drummer Rey Gramacho was diagnosed with carpal tunnel syndrome in his left hand, forcing his departure from the group. He was replaced by Walmar Paim, who remained until 2016.

On September 10, 2013, Bell Marques announced his departure from the band via a YouTube video, citing internal disagreements and divergent opinions. His farewell performance occurred during the Salvador carnival of 2014, concluding at the Camaleão bloc. He subsequently launched his own carnival bloc, "Vumbora." On October 15, 2013, Rafa Chaves, formerly of the band Via Circular, was announced as the new vocalist. His debut performance with the band took place on April 4, 2014, at Carnabeirão in Ribeirão Preto, São Paulo. Under this new lineup, the band recorded a song with the German group Die Höhner for the FIFA World Cup held in Brazil, participated in Fortal (Fortaleza's out-of-season carnival), and released additional tracks including "De Braços Abertos," "Pega no Ar," and "Foi no Nana."

=== 2018–Present: Entry of Khill ===
In January 2018, the band dismissed Rafa Chaves and replaced him with Khill, former vocalist of the band Patchanka. Chaves reported being surprised by his dismissal on the eve of that year's carnival and sought an explanation. Less than a month later, keyboardist Wado Marques stated that despite Chaves's qualities, his profile was incompatible with the band. In October of the same year, Chaves expressed no ill will toward the group and indicated he had come to understand the decision. Lelo Lobão also left the band that year to dedicate himself to the Baianeiros bloc.

On July 26, 2019, former guitarist Cacik Jonne passed away at his home in Salvador at the age of fifty-four due to complications from cerebellar ataxia.

== Discography ==
- Estação Das Cores (1983)
- Traz Os Montes (1983)
- Energia (1984)
- Sementes (1985)
- Fissura (1986)
- Gritos De Guerra (1987)
- Fé Brasileira (1988)
- Tambores Urbanos (1989)
- Toda Mistura Será Permitida (1990)
- Jambo (1991)
- Classificados (1992)
- Chiclete Com Banana (1993)
- 13 (1994)
- Banana Coral (1995)
- Menina Dos Olhos (1996)
- Para Ti (1997)
- É Festa (Ao Vivo) (1997)
- Bem Me Quer (1998)
- Borboleta Azul (1999)
- São João De Rua (2000)
- Chiclete (2000)
- Santo Protetor (2001)
- Chiclete Na Caixa Banana No Cacho (Ao Vivo) (2003)
- Sou Chicleteiro (2004)
- Chiclete na Ponta da Lingua (2005)
- A Força Que nos Move (2015)
- Chicleteiro na Letra (2021)

== Awards Wins ==
Year	Award	Indication	Category	Ref.
1988	Prêmio Sharp de Música Brasileira	Chiclete com Banana	Best Band	
2000	Troféu Dodô e Osmar	"Cabelo Raspadinho"	Best music	
2002	Troféu Dodô e Osmar	"Diga Que Valeu"	Best music	
2005	Troféu Dodô e Osmar	Chiclete com Banana	Best Band	
2006	Troféu Dodô e Osmar	Chiclete com Banana	Best Band	
2009	Troféu Dodô e Osmar	Bloco Nana Banana	Best bloco Barra/Ondina	
2009	Troféu Dodô e Osmar	Bloco Camaleão	Best bloco Avenida	
2009	Troféu Dodô e Osmar	Bell Marques (vocalist the band)	Best Singer	
2010	Troféu Dodô e Osmar	Bloco Nana Banana	Best bloco Barra/Ondina	
2011	Troféu Dodô e Osmar	Bloco Camaleão	Best bloco Barra/Ondina	
2014	Troféu Dodô e Osmar	Bloco Camaleão	Best bloco Barra/Ondina	
