= Bahian guitar =

Brazilian solid-body electric mandolin

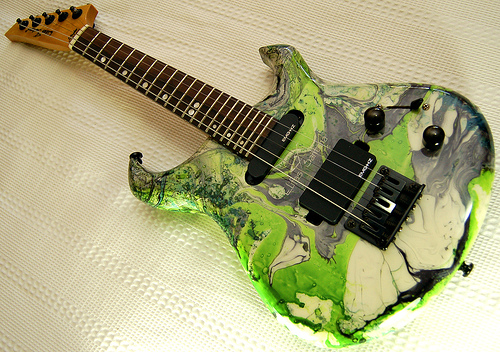

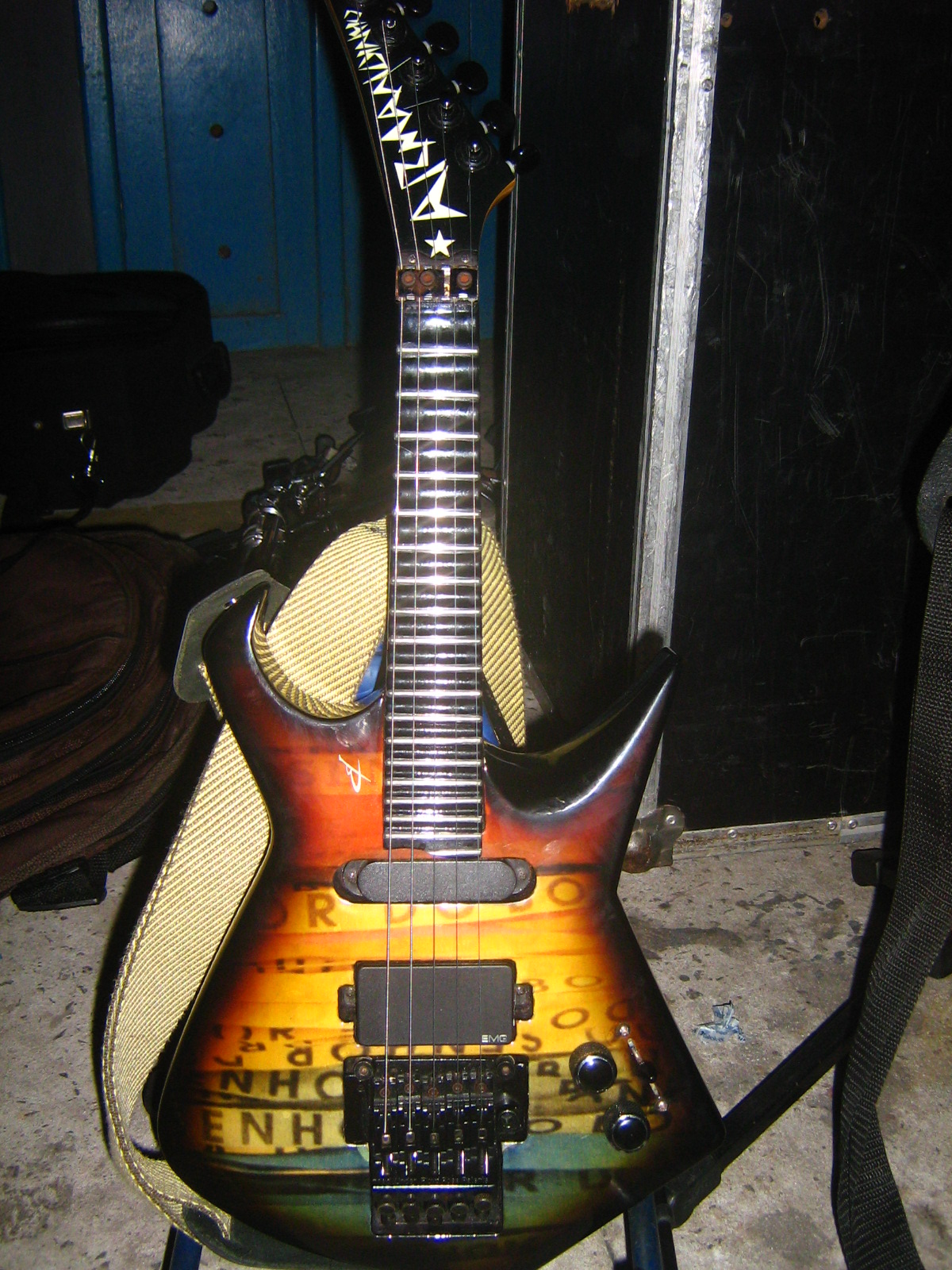

The Bahian guitar in Portuguese: guitarra baiana, pau elétrico (meaning electric pole or electric log (electric stick).) is a Brazilian solid-body electric mandolin with either 4 or 5 strings, normally tuned GDAE and CGDAE, respectively, and has the scale of a cavaco, 6 String versions (adding on a Low F) also exist.

== History ==
The Bahian guitar evolved from the so-called "electric log", developed in the early 1940s by Adolfo "Dodô" Nascimento and Osmar Álvares Macêdo, in Salvador, Brazil. It was equipped with four single strings mounted across a lengthy slab of wood and the neck of a cavaco (hence the names). During the 1950s and 60s, it was used exclusively to play instrumental music during carnival celebrations in Bahia. By the mid-1970s, when it became popular among Brazilian rock and pop musicians, it adopted its current name. This instrument apparently evolved in isolation from the efforts of contemporary American developers like Les Paul or Leo Fender, and given that solid-body electric mandolins did not appear in the United States until the 1950s, the Bahian guitar can be regarded almost as the eldest known electric mandolin, or a descend from its own distinct line of prehistoric solid body guitars. To the degree in which the Bahian guitar counts as a mandolin (despite the differences in measure and lack of double strings – just like in the case of the Mandocaster), the "Electric Log" constitutes the eldest known solid-body electric mandolin. Until its invention, North American developers had not applied the principle of solid or almost-solid bodies to mandolins to the same extent as they had to guitars. The Bahian guitar was also the first headless solid-body electric plucked instrument, and nowadays it is usually manufactured to resemble a miniature electric guitar.

== Carnival usage ==
The Bahian guitar is intimately connected to the Brazilian Carnival, where it is used extensively, especially in Salvador. Its creators are also credited with having set important accents in popular Brazilian music, by inventing an 'endemic' Brazilian version of the electric-guitar, and by supplying it with an individual musical language and style, before anything of such could be imported from abroad. In the late 1960s in Brazil during the Tropicalia movement, there was a lot of disapproval from musicians and critics towards the addition of elements from British/American pop and rock into Brazilian music – including the use of electric guitars; however, this pushback was later reneged upon. The Bahian guitar is still considered responsible for revolutionizing the carnival in the 1950s as an essential ingredient of the "Electric trio" tradition (especially on a space-restricted environment), which since then became the single most important trademark of the Bahia/Brazilian street carnival.
