= Bahian Carnival =

Celebration of Carnival in Bahia state, Brazil

Bahia Carnival
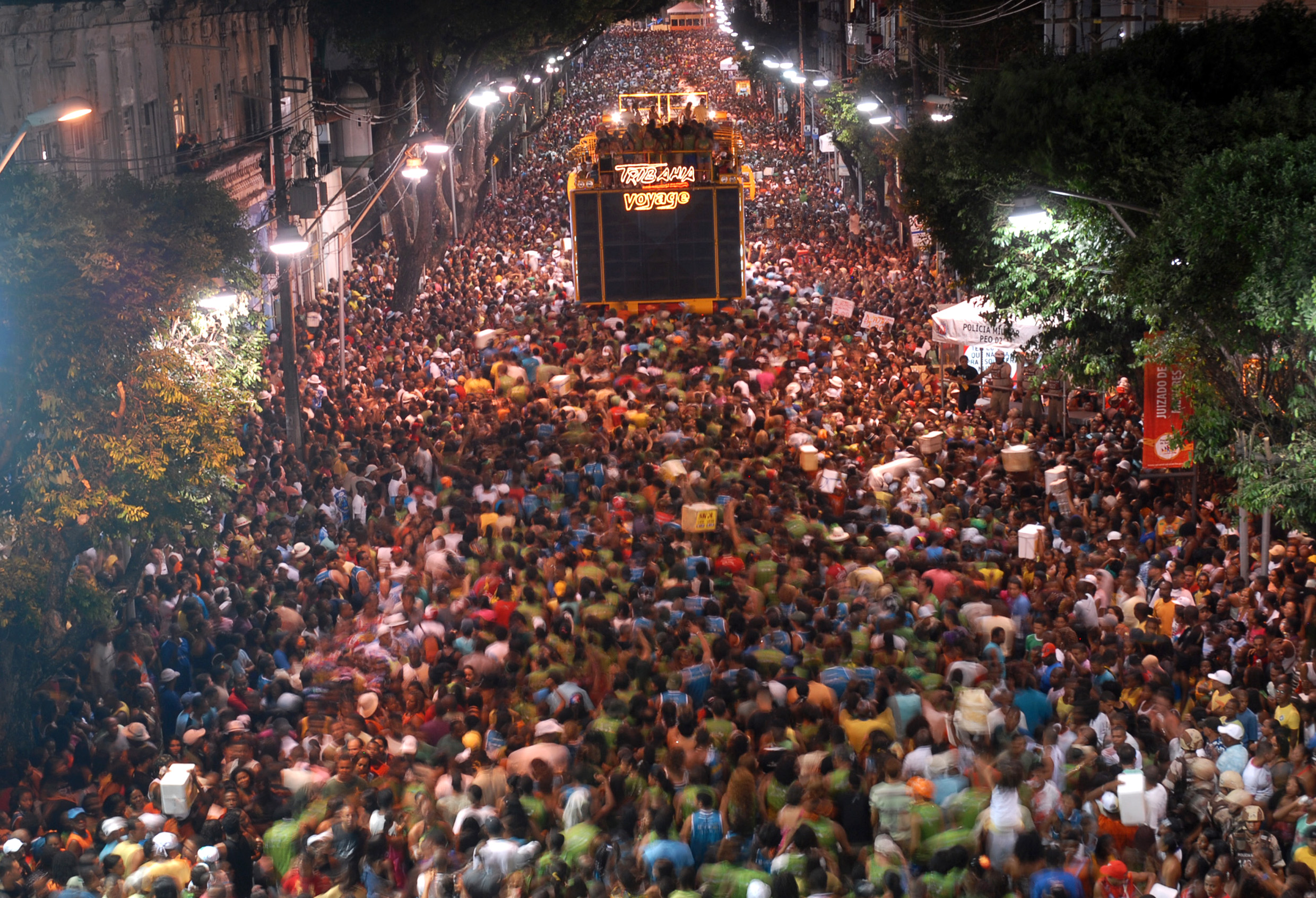
- Carnival parade in Salvador, Brazil
- Also called: "The biggest carnival in the world"(Portuguese: O maior carnaval do mundo)
- Type: cultural, religious
- Significance: Celebration prior to fasting season of Lent.
- Celebrations: Parades, parties, open-air performances
- Begins: Thursday before Ash Wednesday (52 days to Easter)
- Ends: Ash Wednesday noon (46 days before Easter)
- 2025 date: Afternoon, February 27 – midday, March 5
- 2026 date: Afternoon, February 12 – midday, February 18
- 2027 date: Afternoon, February 4 – midday, February 10
- 2028 date: Afternoon, February 24 – midday, March 1
- Duration: 6 days
- Frequency: annual
- Related to: Carnival, Brazilian Carnival, Ash Wednesday, Lent, Micareta

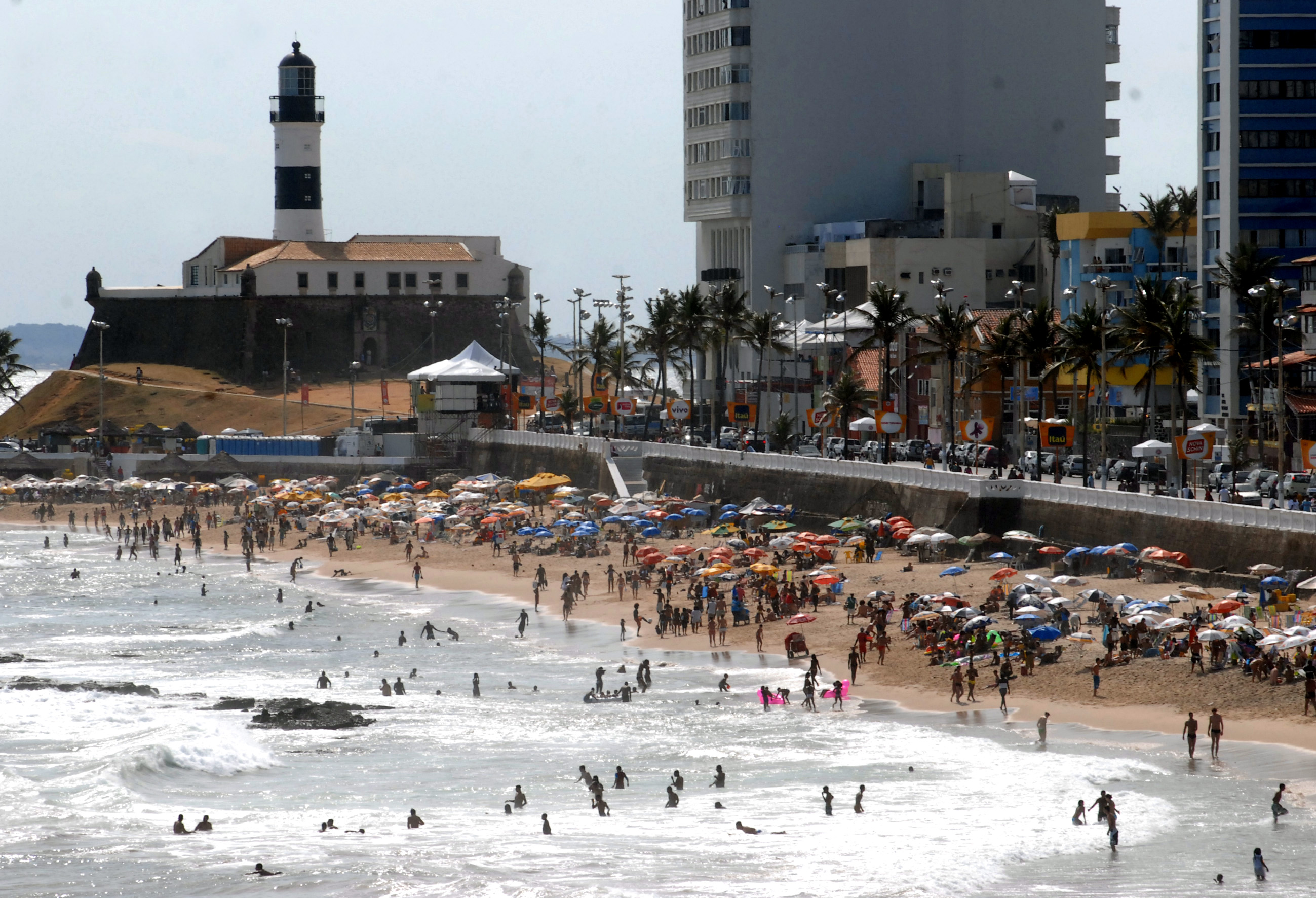
Barra-Ondina Circuit, one of the tracks where music groups sing above the trio elétrico in Salvador, Bahia

Bahian Carnival (Portuguese: Carnaval baiano) is the annual carnival festival celebrated in the Brazilian state of Bahia, mainly in its capital, Salvador. The event officially lasts for six days, beginning on the Thursday before Ash Wednesday and concluding on Ash Wednesday at noon. The term may also be used to comprise related events that happen immediately before or after, extending the duration for up to twelve days.

The festival happens simultaneously in many sites, the most famous being the Campo Grande track in the upper part of the city, the Barra-Ondina track by the shore, and Pelourinho (a historical neighborhood). It features performances by several music groups. The most traditional presentations are the trio elétrico parades and Afro blocks presentations. It is estimated that approximately 2.5 million people (including 1.5 million tourists) participate in the festivities every year. Economic reports show that the festival has a large impact at Salvador's local economy.

== History ==
In 1950, Adolfo Dodô Nascimento and Osmar Álvares Macêdo, better known as Dodô and Osmar created the Fobica, an open float adapted for musical presentations, and the trio elétrico was born. By 1952, the term trio elétrico had become generic, in reference to a truck or bus carrying musicians around during Bahian carnival. In 1969, Caetano Veloso's song "Atrás do trio-elétrico" ("Behind the Trio-elétrico") popularized the trio elétrico sound nationwide. Today, the presence of trio elétrico trucks is one of the main attractions of the Carnaval da Bahia.

No Carnival was held in 2021.

== Organization ==
=== Preceding events and official opening ===
Starting from New Year's Eve, several events loosely related to the carnival happen in Salvador. The most traditional is Lavagem do Bonfim, which happens since 1745 on the second Thursday of January. A more recent event is the Salvador Summer Festival, a music festival which usually happens in late January.

Some events that are closely related to carnival take place few days before the official opening. The most traditional is the party for the nomination of the year's Carnival's Queen and King Momo. Moreover, the ensaios de carnaval (English: carnival rehearsals) have become a tradition since the 1990s. Typically, these are private events with informal presentations from the artists that will perform in the carnival.

The official carnival opening in Salvador happens on the Thursday immediately before Ash Wednesday. It happens one day before the traditional carnival calendar, which starts on Friday. This happens for commercial reasons only. The official opening follows the tradition as in the rest of Brazil: there is a ceremony where the city major gives a symbolic key of the city to King Momo, who declares that carnival celebrations are officially opened. Parades already happen in the early evening of Thursday.

=== The carnival events ===
Parades and other events happen during the six official days of carnival, for an average of 16 hours a day. The municipality defines the ordering, starting and ending times for each carnival block to parade. Delays may result in fines. The components of a block have a predefined meeting time in the beginning of their track, called concentração (English: concentration). After the parade concludes its official track, the trio elétricos go to a special place called dispersão (English: dispersion), where there is no longer separation between members of blocks and the audience. It is not infrequently that artists that were playing in the parade extend their presentations at the dispersion area.

Concurrently to the parades happen the informal "abadá" business. There, merrymakers sell, buy and exchange "abadás" for the different blocks and VIP cabins. Scalpers are present in significant quantity and act freely. The two most common sites are the Aeroclube Mall and Shopping Barra.

=== Official ending and post-events ===
It became a tradition in 2000s that the last regular block to parade is Voa Voa, starting in the morning dawn of Wednesday.

Arrastão (English: big trawler) is the last official event before the carnival ending. It starts on Wednesday early morning, and finishes before noon. There trio-elétricos parade the Barra-Ondina track in backward direction (from Ondina, towards the Barra Lighthouse). There is no separation between the block and the audience. The carnival is officially over at Wednesday noon.

Ressaca de Carnaval (English: Carnival Hangover) are the celebrations following immediately after the carnival ending. Porto Seguro, in the south of Bahia, became prominent site for ressaca. Its format is similar to the trio elétrico street parades in Salvador, with a significant overlap in the performing acts. Morro de São Paulo is another popular site, where there is no official (governmental) organization, and most parties are private.

Within one month after the official ending, some media groups host award gala events to recognize outstanding achievement in the carnival. The most traditional accolades are Dodô and Osmar Trophy (Grupo A Tarde), Band Folia Trophy (Rede Bandeirantes) and Troféu Bahia Folia (Rede Bahia de Televisão). Categories vary between the events. Common ones include best artist, best new artist, best bloco and best song (considered the most prestigious).

== Carnival blocos ==
Meanwhile, the carnaval blocos began to evolve and branch out into various currents of aesthetic, musical, and even religious manifestations. While members of the afoxés brought their Afro-Brazilian religious cosmology to the Carnaval procession by maintaining their African roots with the puxada do ijexá (a rhythm played in honor of the orixás or Afro-Brazilian deities), the flourishing middle-class blocos mostly relied on carnaval music styled on Rio de Janeiro's samba-enrredos.

Then the Afro-blocos emerged with an aesthetical proposal extrapolated from the Indian blocos, introducing some fundamental innovations in the process: parades revolved around themes and music was tailored to fit the occasion. During this phase, Bahia's street carnaval was infused with the glamour and elitism propagated by carnaval clubs, initiating a slight reversal of the egalitarian ideal.

== Bahian carnival musicians ==
With the emergence of new Bahian talent who continued to popularize regional rhythms, Carnaval became more of an organized affair though it somehow retained its informality and contagious spontaneity. The success of Luiz Caldas, Sara Jane, and Chiclete com Banana, along with the evolution of Ilê Aiyê and the emergence of Olodum played a part in transforming Salvador's Carnaval into the biggest, longest, most itinerant open-air show in the world. The upper and middle classes finally succumbed to the Carnaval–inspired ideal of racial harmony and by the end of the 1980s the pre-Lent celebration entered a process of irreversible debauchery. Street carnaval came to represent the collective identity of Bahian Carnaval.

By the start of a new decade, Bahia's Carnaval became an institutionalized talent factory. The success of precursors such as Luis Caldas, Chiclete com Banana, Ilê Aiyê, Margareth Menezes, and Olodum heralded the convergence of Carnaval and commercial music. Slowly the northeastern and national music markets began to open.

Between 1992 and 1993 Bahian Carnaval became the stage for the greatest success in Brazil's musical landscape yet: Daniela Mercury landed the number-one spot in radio stations throughout Brazil with her samba-reggae hit "O Canto da Cidade". Her show broke public attendance records from Oiapoque to Chuí and she became the first exponent of the new Bahian sound to have a television special on her musical career transmitted on a national station, Rede Globo. Mercury's stunning success radically tore down the preconceptions and barriers that Brazil's musical epicenters had imposed on Bahian music with origins entrenched in carnaval. Ironically, Mercury's huge success on a national scale transformed her into Bahian Carnaval's main artist. She achieved that distinction long after having conquered a niche in Bahia and having participated in many carnavals. currently names like Ivete Sangalo, BaianaSystem, Cláudia Leitte, and Leo Santana.
