= Brazilian Carnival =

Annual festival in Brazil

Rio Carnival
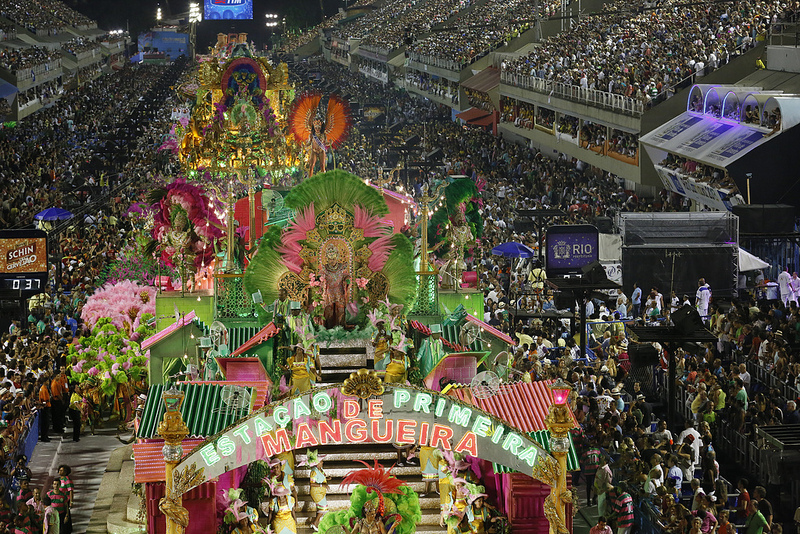
- Carnival in Rio de Janeiro.
- Also called: Carnaval
- Observed by: Brazilians, communities worldwide
- Type: Cultural, Religious (Roman Catholicism)
- Significance: Celebration prior to fasting season of Lent.
- Begins: Friday before Ash Wednesday (51 days to Easter)
- Ends: Ash Wednesday midday (46 days before Easter)
- 2025 date: Afternoon, February 28 – midday, March 5
- 2026 date: Afternoon, February 13 – midday, February 18
- 2027 date: Afternoon, February 5 – midday, February 10
- 2028 date: Afternoon, February 25 – midday, March 1
- Duration: 6 days
- Frequency: annual
- Related to: Carnival, Mardi Gras, Ash Wednesday, Lent

The Carnival of Brazil (Portuguese: Carnaval do Brasil, IPA: [kaʁnaˈvaw]) is an annual festival. The celebrations occur for five days before Ash Wednesday at noon, to mark the beginning of Lent, the forty-day period before Easter. During Lent, Roman Catholics and some other Christians traditionally abstain from the consumption of meat and poultry, hence the term "carnival", from carnelevare, "to remove (literally, 'raise') meat".

Carnival is the most popular holiday in Brazil and has become an event of huge proportions. Except for industrial production, retail establishments such as malls, and carnival-related businesses, the country unifies completely for almost a week and festivities are intense, day and night, mainly in coastal cities. Rio de Janeiro's carnival alone drew 6 million people in 2018, with 1.5 million being travelers from inside and outside Brazil. Rio's carnival is the largest single carnival parade in the world according to Guinness World Records. Meanwhile, the carnival of São Paulo is the largest street carnival celebration by number of participants.

Historically its origins can be traced to the Portuguese Age of Discoveries when their caravels passed regularly through Madeira island, a territory which already celebrated emphatically its carnival season, and where they were loaded with goods but also people and their ludic and cultural expressions.

== Characteristics ==
Rhythm, participation, and costumes vary from one region of Brazil to another. In the southeastern cities of Rio de Janeiro, São Paulo, and Vitória, huge organized parades are led by samba schools. Those official parades are meant to be watched by the public, while minor parades (blocos) allowing public participation can be found in those as well as other cities, like Belo Horizonte, also in the southeastern region. The northeastern cities of Recife, Olinda, Salvador, and Porto Seguro have organized groups parading through streets, and public interacts directly with them. It is a six-day party where crowds follow the trios elétricos through the city streets, dancing and singing. Also in northeast, Olinda carnival features unique characteristics, heavily influenced by local folklore and cultural manifestations, such as Frevo and Maracatu.

The typical genres of music of Brazilian carnival are, in the Southeast Region in general, mostly cities of Rio de Janeiro and São Paulo: the samba-enredo, the samba de bloco, the samba de embalo and the marchinha; and in the Northeast Region including Pernambuco (mostly cities of Olinda and Recife): frevo and maracatu, and Bahia (mostly the city of Salvador): samba-reggae, pagode (also a type of Samba) and the main genre axé music. These rhythms were mainly developed by Afro-Brazilians and Pardos, incorporating and adapting many cultural influences, from the percussion beats of Africa to the military fanfares of Europe and Iberian music in the use of instruments like pandeiro and cavaquinho.

Brazilian carnival in essence is a synthesis of European, Native American, and Afro-Brazilian cultural influences, each group has played an important role in the development of the structure and aesthetic of the Brazilian carnival of today. For instance, the main rhythms used in carnival celebrations were developed by Afro-Brazilians and make use of European instruments like the cavaquinho and pandeiro to create melodies and arrangements. Also the costumes in the Brazilian carnival borrow concepts from the clothing of the Indigenous peoples of South America, in the use of feathers and scantily clad clothing. Religious cultural references are also common in Brazilian carnival, specially those related to Catholicism and Afro Candomblé practices.

== Disruptions ==
The Carnival was first suspended in 1912, following the death of the Baron of Rio Branco, at the time Brazilian Minister of External Relations. The mayor of Rio reportedly postponed all licenses for the Carnival associations, but despite this many residents still partied in the streets anyway. The Carnival went on as scheduled despite World War I and World War II, besides during Brazil's military dictatorship, despite strict regulations.

The first disruption to the carnival in 108 years took place in late September 2020 amid the COVID-19 pandemic in Brazil, when the 2021 festival was cancelled. The next festival was initially scheduled from 26 February – 2 March 2022, depending on the evolution of the epidemiological situation in the country, but was also ultimately cancelled. The carnival celebrations finally returned on 19 February 2023 after two years of hiatus, but floods and landslides caused some festivities to be cancelled.

== By region ==
=== Rio de Janeiro ===
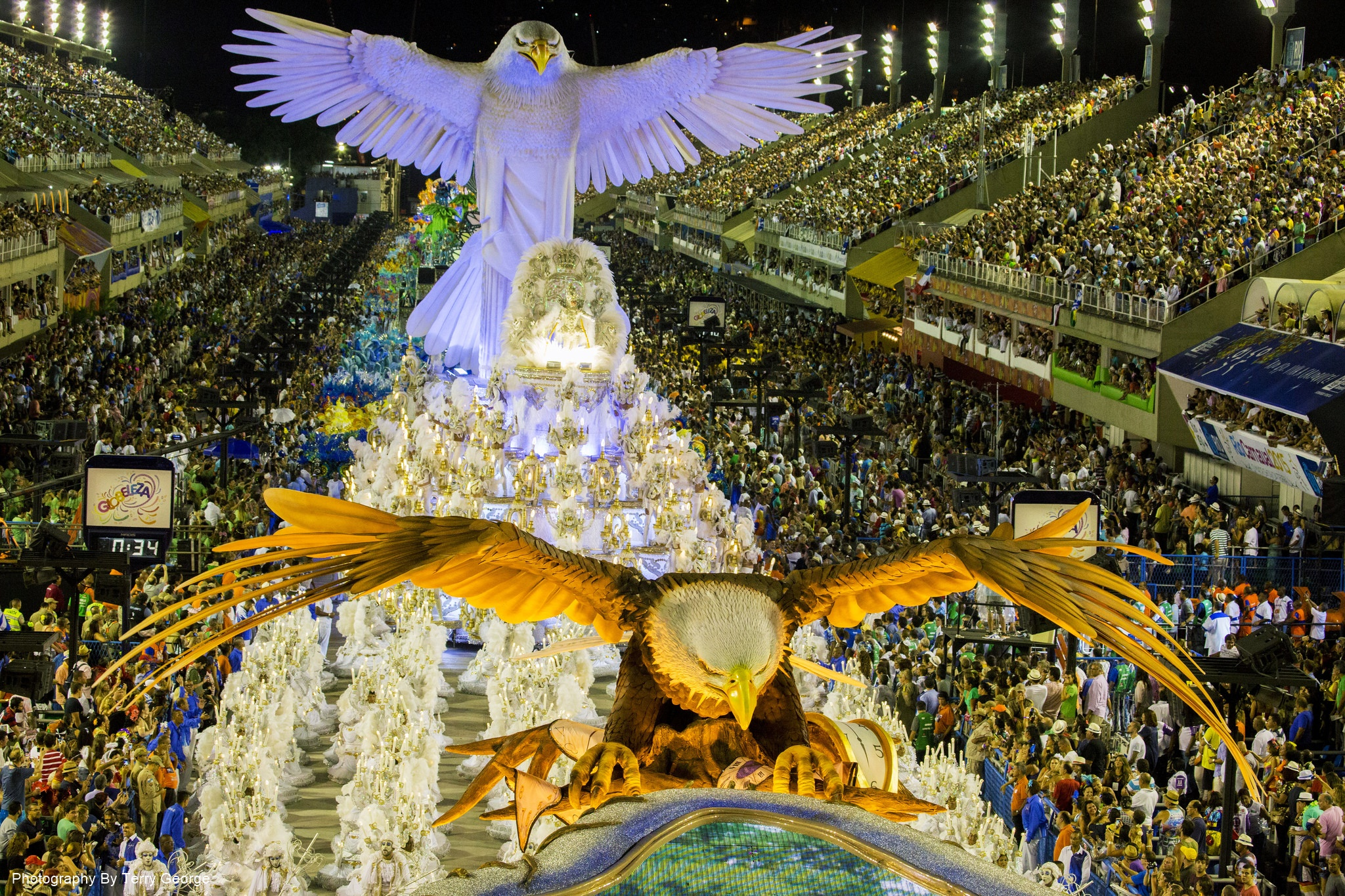
Samba schools parades in the Sambadrome in the 2015 Rio Carnival

In the late 18th century, the "cordões" (literally "cords", laces or strings in Portuguese) combined with the "dança do coco" (literally "coconut dance" an Afro-Brazilian dance troupe form) were introduced in Rio de Janeiro. These were pageant groups that paraded through city avenues performing on instruments and dancing. Today they are known as Carnaval blocos (blocks), consisting of a group of people who dress in costumes or special T-shirts with themes and/or logos. Blocos are generally associated with particular neighbourhoods; they include both a percussion or music group and an entourage of revelers. They eventually became the "fathers" of what everyone today knows as the famous and internationally renowned samba-schools in Brazil. Samba-schools (not only in Rio de Janeiro, but in São Paulo and several other cities) are the cultural epicenter of the Brazilian carnival, in terms of the "parading style". The first registered samba-school was called "Deixa-falar", but disappeared later and the first official samba-school contest happened in 1929, with only three groups, and "Oswaldo Cruz" group won the competition, with a samba written by Heitor dos Prazeres. GRES Estação Primeira de Mangueira Samba-School, represented by Cartola, and Estácio de Sá samba School, represented by Ismael Silva, were the other 2 contestants. Eventually, "Oswaldo Cruz" became Portela Samba School, the greatest winner of Rio's Carnival with 22 Titles. Although many Brazilians tend now to favor other forms of national music culture to that of Rio's samba schools, the carnival of Rio de Janeiro remains the national festival par excellence, and the samba of Rio de Janeiro continues to be an agent of national unification.

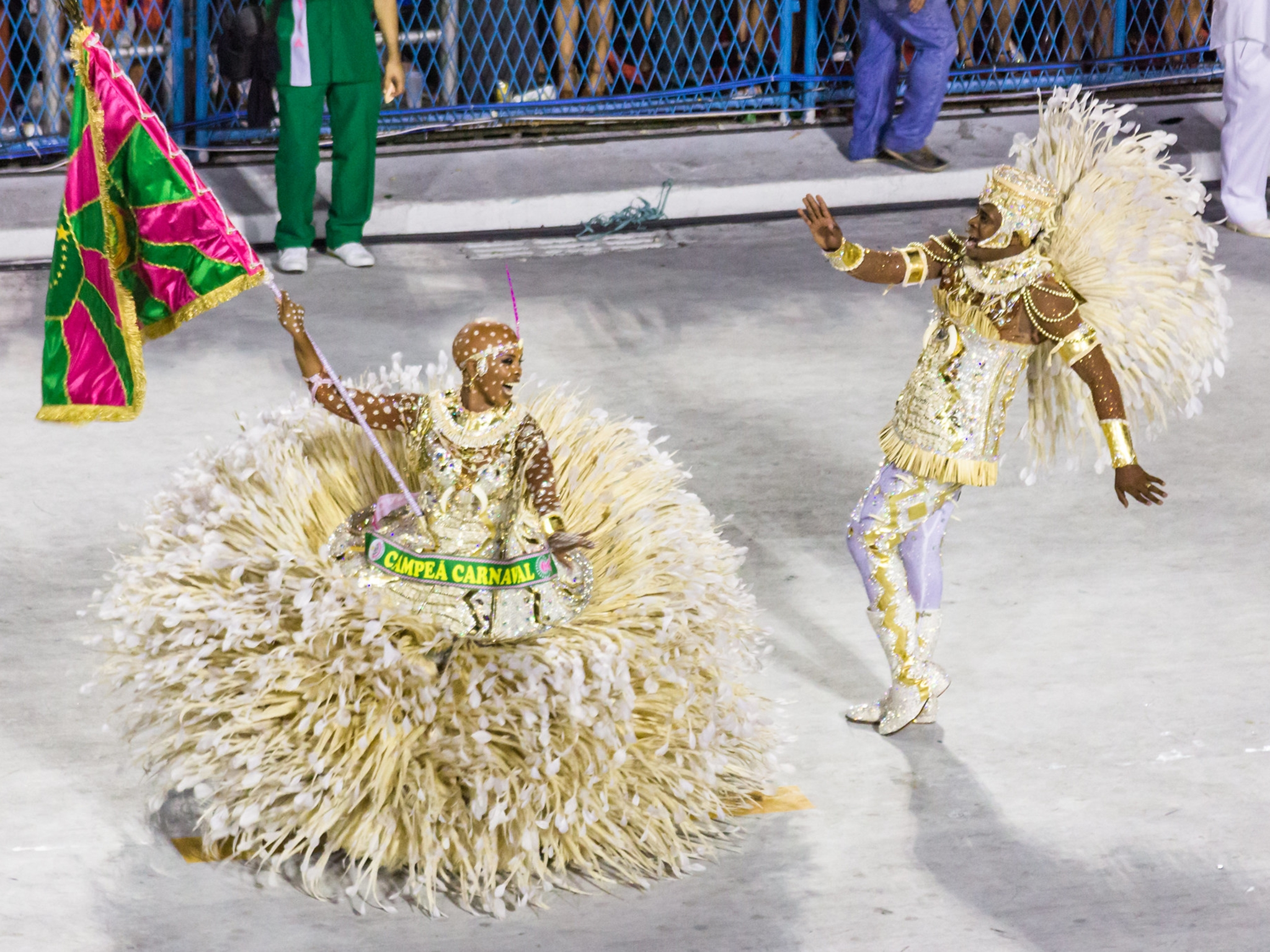
A typical couple performers of Samba dance

Carnaval blocos, also known as Blocos de Rua ("Street Blocks") occur in nearly every neighborhood throughout the city and metropolitan areas, but the most famous are the ones in Copacabana, Ipanema, Leblon, Lagoa, Jardim Botânico, and in downtown Rio. Organizers often compose their own music themes that are added to the performance and singing of classic "marchinhas" and samba popular songs. "Cordão do bola preta" ("Polka Dot Bloco"), that goes through the heart of Rio's historical center, and "Suvaco do Cristo" ('Armpit of Christ the Redeemer', referring to the angle of the statue seen from the neighborhood), near the Botanical Garden, are some of the most famous groups. Monobloco has become so famous that it plays all year round at parties and small concerts.

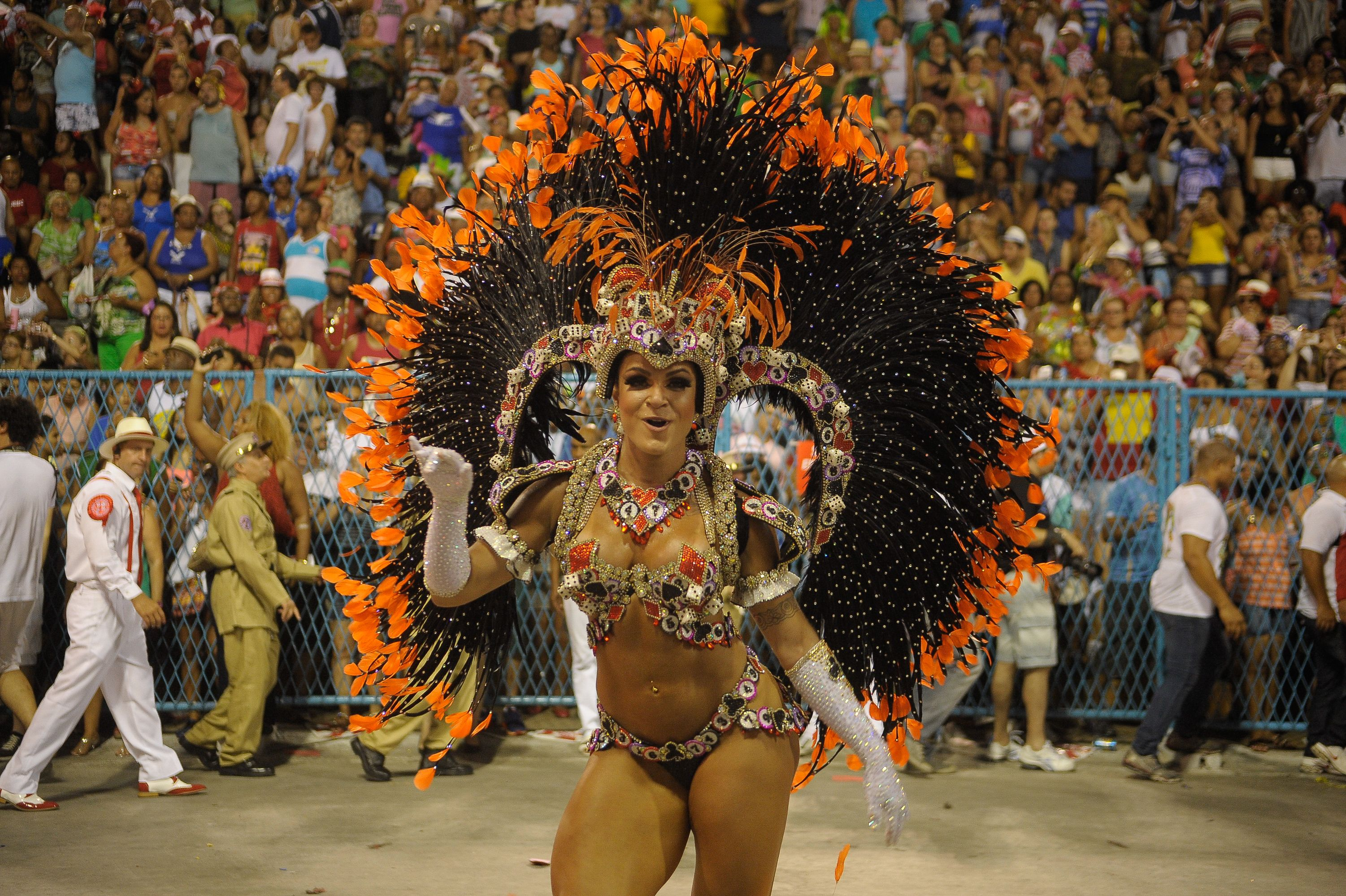
Carnival queen of Rio de Janeiro

The formalized samba schools are very small groups of performers, financed by respected organizations (as well as legal gambling groups), who work year-round in preparation for Carnival. Samba Schools perform in the Sambadrome, which runs four entire nights and is overseen by LIESA. They are part of an official competition, divided into seven divisions, in which a single school is declared the winner, according to ten judging categories that include costume, flow, theme, and band music quality and performance. Some samba schools also hold street parties in their neighborhoods, through which they parade along with their followers.

All performers at the Sambadrome have to wear a costume. Some honored members of the school or community may receive one for free, but normally, most will have to pay for their own. Tourists can have the same experience on the "Commercial Area" of some Samba Schools but need to buy their own costume from the school, or through an agent, either of which can be quite costly.

=== Bahia ===
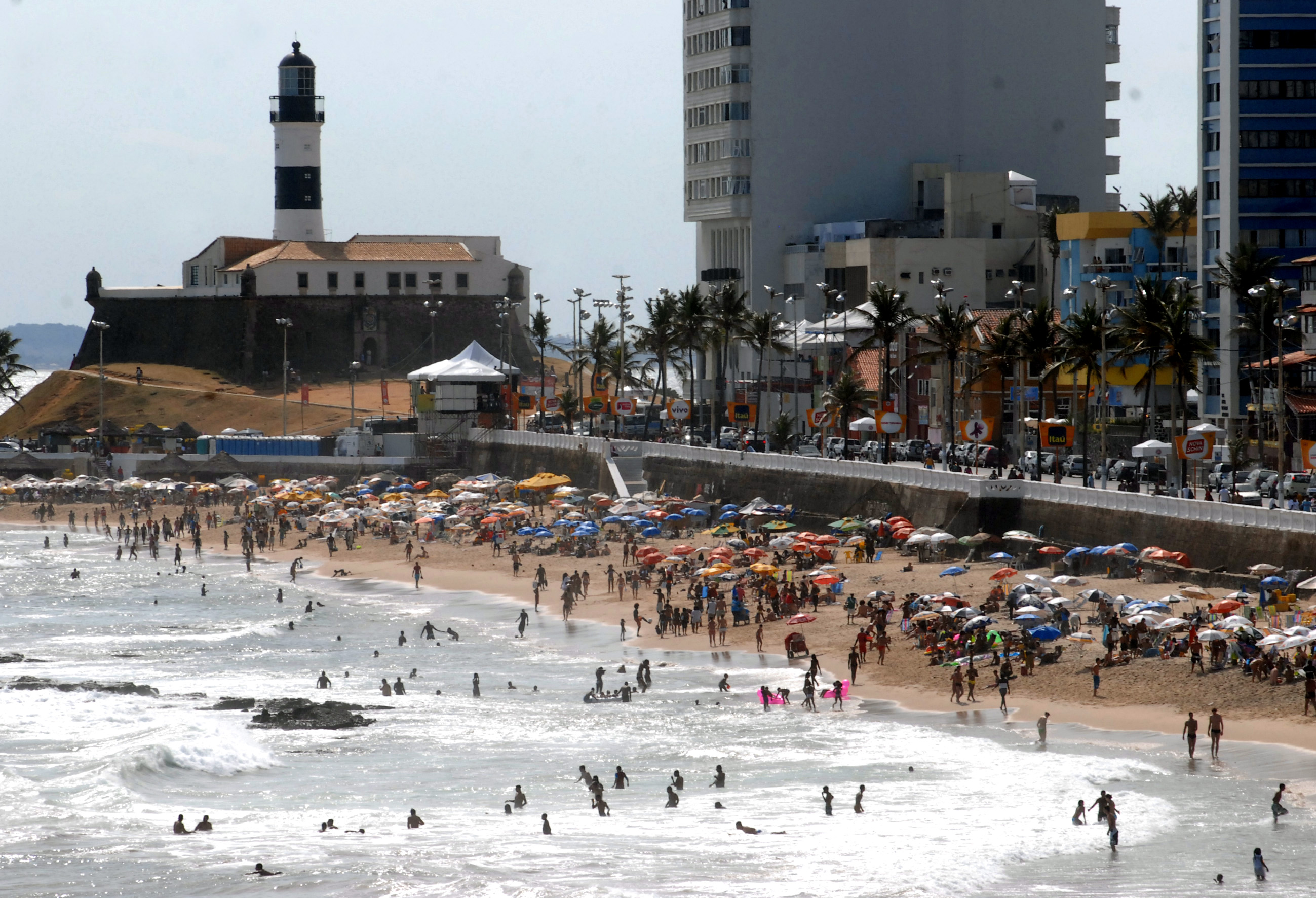
Circuit Barra-Ondina, the most famous line of Brazil where attractions sing above the trio elétrico in the city of Salvador, Bahia

There are several major differences between Carnival in the state of Bahia in Northeastern Brazil and Carnival in Rio de Janeiro. The musical styles are different at each carnival; in Bahia there are many rhythms, including samba, samba reggae, axé, etc., while in Rio there is the multitude of samba styles: the "samba-enredo", the "samba de bloco", the "samba de embalo", the "samba funk", as well as the famous "marchinhas" played by the "bandas" in the streets.

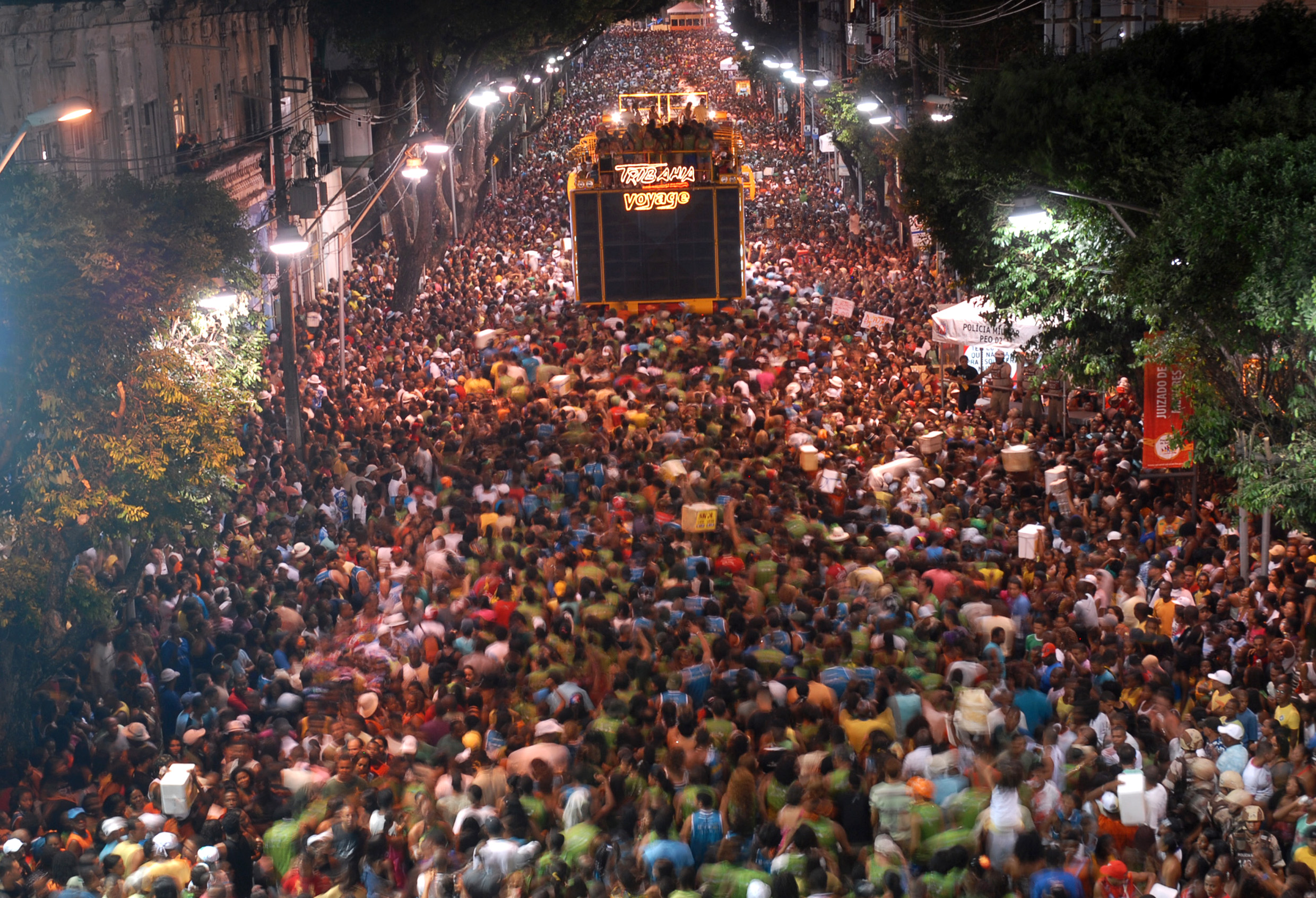
Carnival circuit of the city of Salvador.

By the 1970s, four main types of carnival groups developed in Bahia: Afoxês, Trios Elétricos, "Amerindian" groups, and Blocos Afros. Afoxês use the rhythms of the African inspired religion, Candomblé. They also worship the gods of Candomblé, called orixás. An Electric Trio is characterized by a truck equipped with giant speakers and a platform where musicians play songs of local genres such as axé. People follow the trucks singing and dancing. The "Amerindian" groups were inspired by Western movies from the United States. The groups dress up as Native Americans and take on Native American names. Blocos Afros, or Afro groups, were influenced by the Black Pride Movement in the United States, independence movements in Africa, and reggae music that denounced racism and oppression. The groups inspired a renewed pride in African heritage.

Today, Bahia's carnival consists mostly of Trios Elétricos, but there are still Blocos Afros and Afoxês. Every year, about half a million tourists are attracted to Salvador. It is also possible to watch everything from the Camarotes (ringside seats) spread out along the way, offering more comfort to the visitors.

=== Pernambuco ===
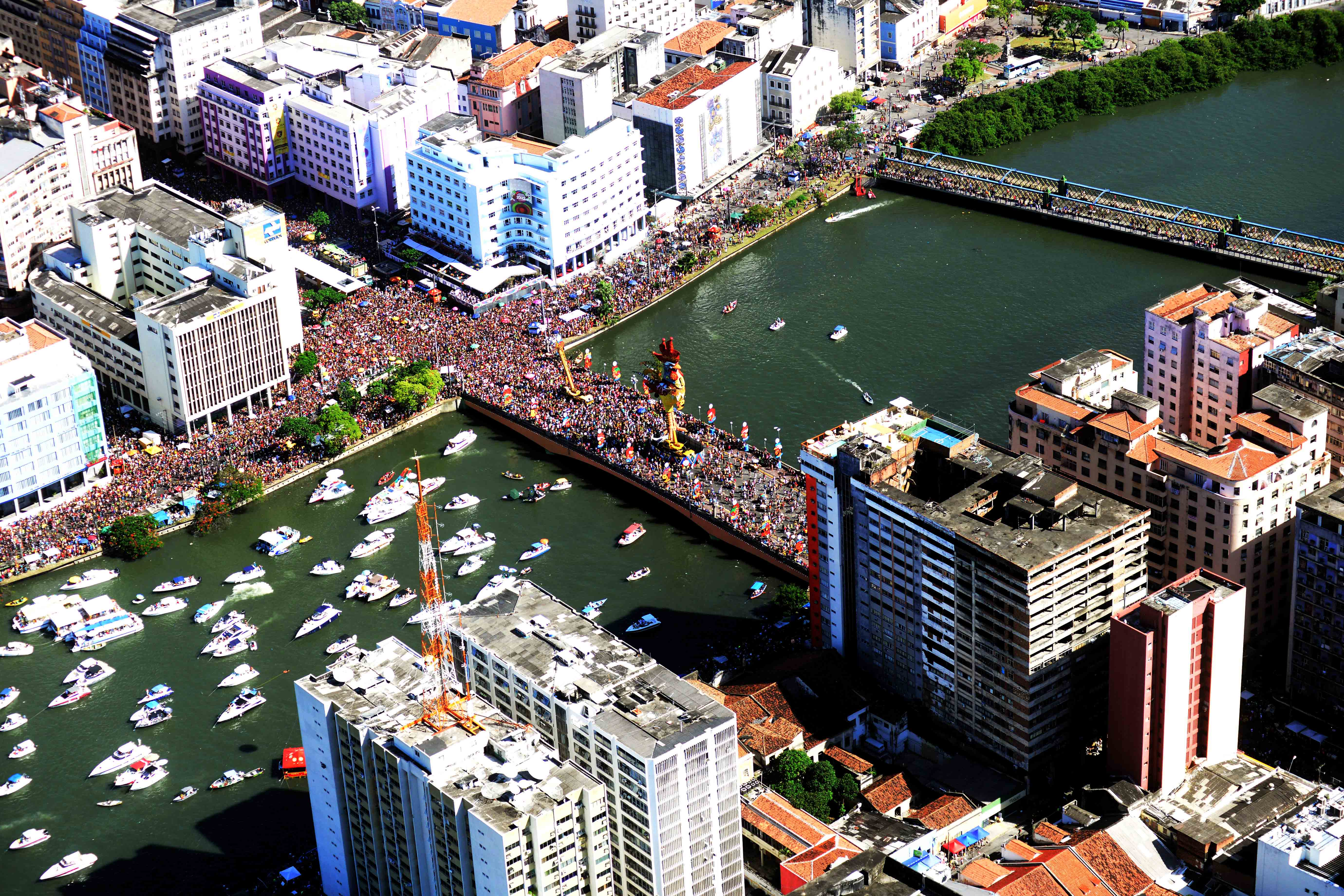
Recife Carnival, in the capital city of the State of Pernambuco, Recife

The northeast state of Pernambuco has unique Carnivals in its present capital Recife and in its colonial capital Olinda. Their main rhythms are the frevo and the maracatu. Galo da Madrugada is the biggest carnival parade in the world, considering the number of participants, according The Guinness Book of World Records. It means "dawn's rooster" and parades, as the name suggests, in the morning only. Frevo is Pernambucan-style dance with acrobatic-like movements, as it is fast and electrifying, often using an open umbrella and frequent legs and arms movements.

Unlike Salvador and Rio, the festivities in Recife, Olinda and Itamaraca do not include group competitions. Instead, groups dance and play instruments side by side. Troças and maracatus, mostly of African influence, begin one week before Carnival and end a week later.

=== São Paulo ===
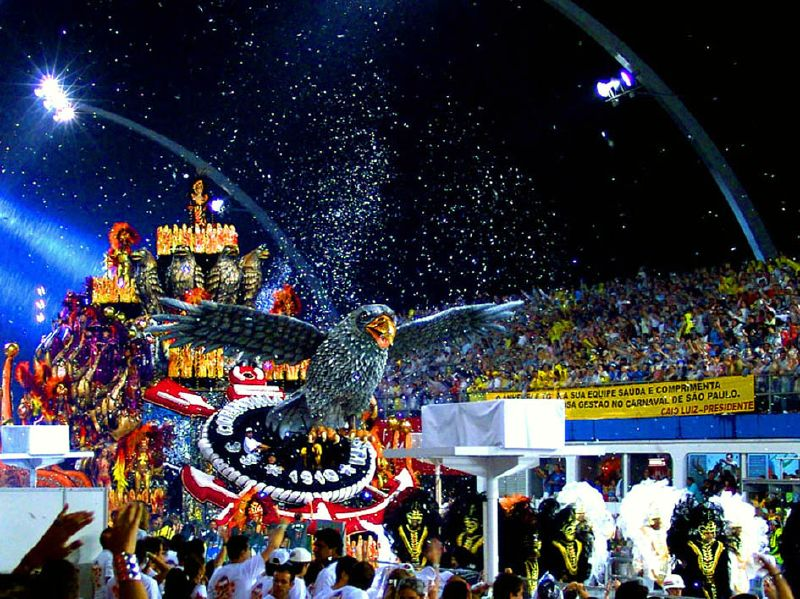
Carnival parade in São Paulo, Gaviões da Fiel Torcida Samba School.

The carnival in São Paulo takes place in the Anhembi Sambadrome on the Friday and Saturday night of the week of Carnival, as opposed to Rio's Carnival, which is held on Sunday and Monday night.

Various "samba schools" compete in a huge parade. Each school presents a different theme, which they expose through their costumes, dance, music, and the allegorical cars or "carros alegóricos", huge vehicles decorated according to the theme designed specifically for the parade. The schools are responsible for choosing their own themes, which usually revolve around historical happenings or some sort of cultural or political movement.

Vai-Vai is the oldest school and has been the Special Group champion most times (15 total, including the 2015 championship). It also is the most popular, for it has a larger fan base and many supporters among the people of the city.

It is considered the most LGBTQ+ friendly Carnival in Brazil. In 2017, the Sexual Diversity Museum of São Paulo formed its own Carnival group to provide the message of inclusion, peace, and respect for all LGBT people. In 2020, São Paulo Carnival has featured Camilla Prins, the first transgender woman to lead a samba school in any Carnival event in Brazil.

=== Espírito Santo ===
The Carnival in Vitória are performed one week before Carnival, more precisely in Sambão do Povo. The schools are responsible for choosing their own themes, which usually revolve around historical happenings or some sort of cultural or political movement.

More than the traditional school parade, the carnival in Espirito Santos includes a large set of attractions, especially in the beach areas of the state, from north to south.

=== Minas Gerais ===
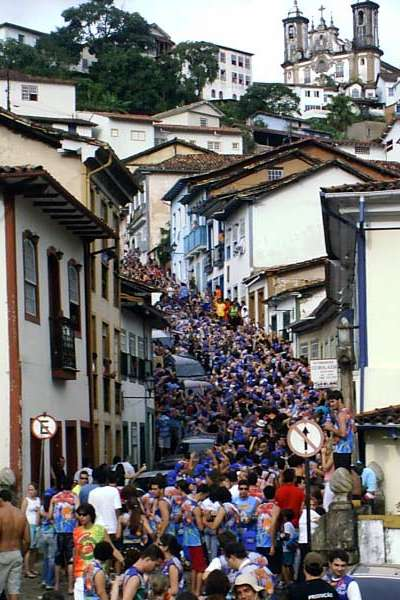
Carnival parade of Ouro Preto, Minas Gerais.

Carnival in Minas Gerais is often characterized by blocos carnavalescos with varying themes and costume styles, typically accompanied by a brass and drums band. The carnival has been heavily influenced by the Rio de Janeiro Carnival, and several cities hold parades with samba schools. More recently, Axé groups from Bahia come to play in the state. The most traditional carnival parades happen in the historic cities of Ouro Preto, Mariana, São João del Rei, and Diamantina. Since the 2010s, the carnival in the state capital Belo Horizonte has increased heavily in popularity, Other cities in the state, such as Juiz de Fora, Abaeté, Pompéu, and Três Pontas, also have popular parades.

Ouro Preto is popular among college students. The city has a large proportion of students, who during the year live in places called Repúblicas (a Brazilian equivalent to a frat house). During carnival, the Repúblicas turn to affordable accommodation for both residents and visitors coming from all over the country. The city hills, narrow streets, and stone pavement prevent traffic of heavy sound trucks. Zé Pereira dos Lacaios, the oldest carnival block in Brazil with more than 150 years, parade in the city.

The first carnival party in Belo Horizonte took place in 1897, even before the inauguration of the city. Still, for decades the carnival in the city was not as popular as in historical cities. Beginning in the 2010s the situation has changed, and the carnival has started gaining increased popularity. In 2017, Belo Horizonte had the largest carnival in its history and the third-largest in Brazil. There were more than three million people on the streets, with about 500,000 tourists. The Baianas Ozadas block hit a record audience of 500,000 people.

Juiz de Fora had one of the three largest carnivals in Brazil in the 1980s. But it has been steadily losing popularity. A deadlock between the league of local samba schools (LIESJUF) and the municipality's culture agency (Funalfa) prevented parades in the city since 2016. As a temporary solution, the parades have been held at Intendente Magalhães.

=== Others ===
Some Southern cities such as Uruguaiana, Florianópolis, and Porto Alegre have smaller samba school groups or blocos, but like São Paulo state towns, they seem to prefer balls to street dancing. Curitiba hosts modest carnival celebrations similar to those of other Brazilian cities and events such as Curitiba Rock Festival and a carnival Zombie Walk, all supported by Cultural Foundation of Curitiba which operates under supervision of government of Curitiba.

== Sambódromo ==
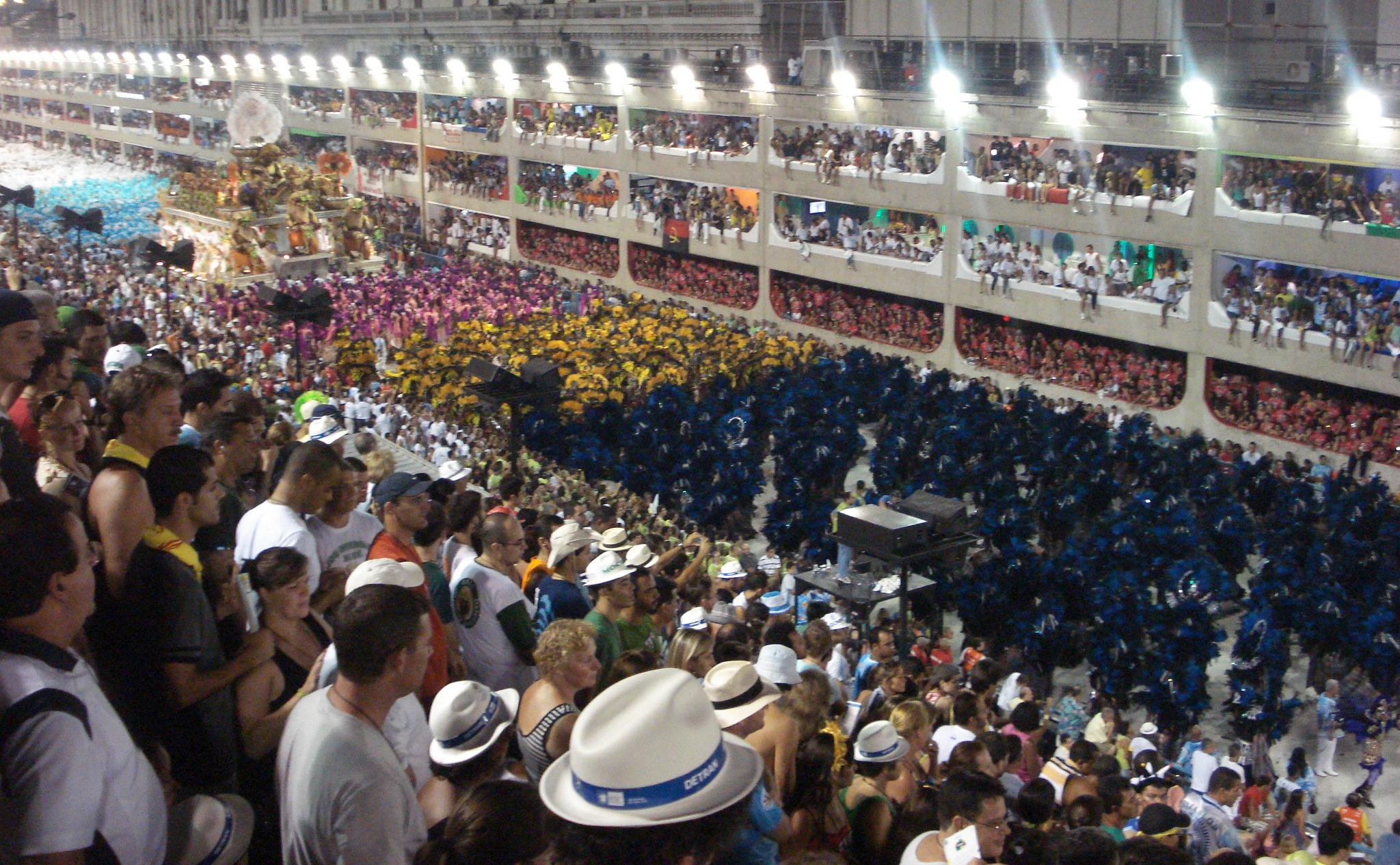
The Sambódromo of Rio

The Carnival parades in Rio de Janeiro and São Paulo take place in their sambódromos, located close to the city center. In the Rio Sambódromo, the parades start at 20:00 or 21:00 (depending on the date) and end around 5:00 in the morning. The Rio de Janeiro Metro operates 24 hours during the main parade days.

== Music ==
=== Samba ===
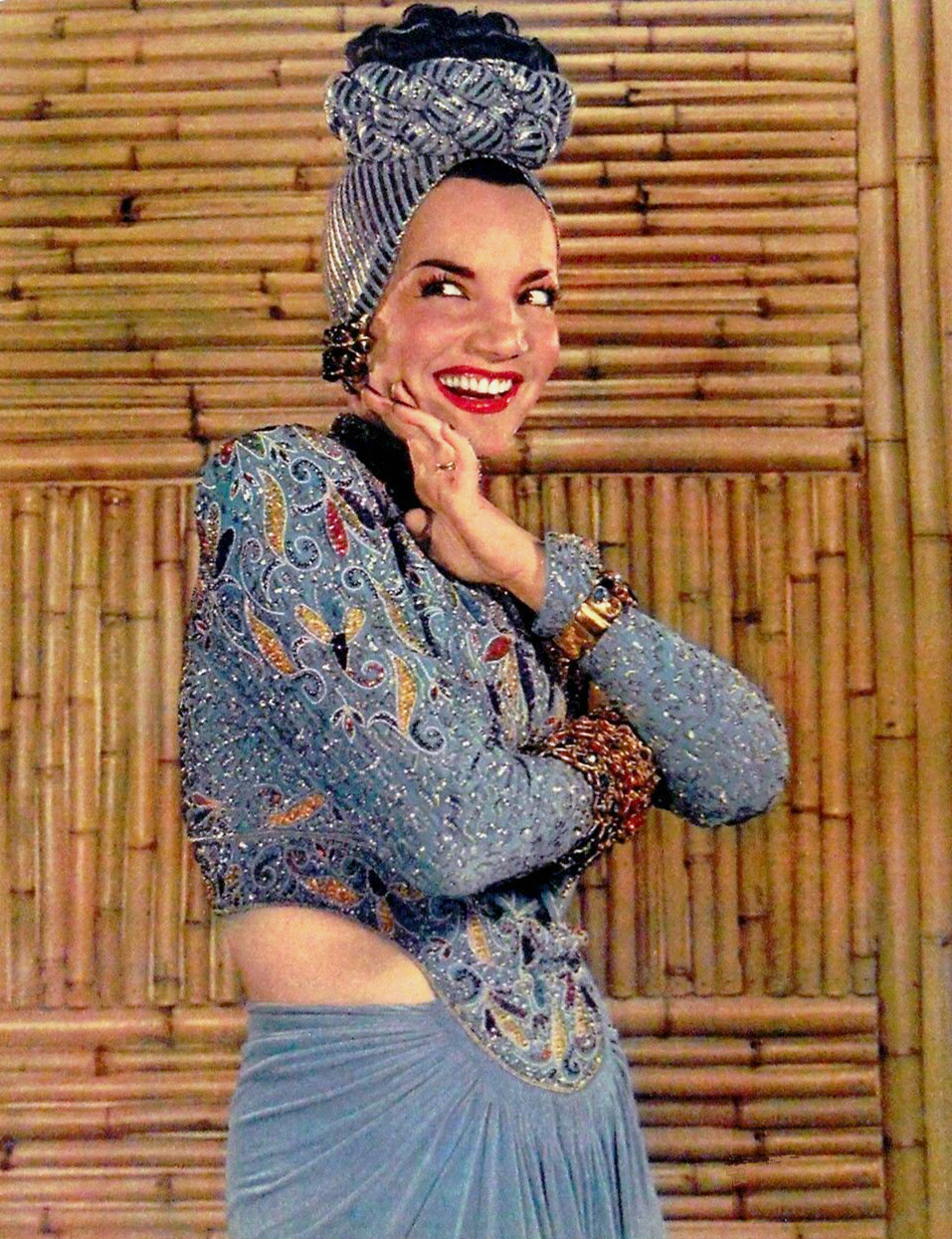
Singer Carmen Miranda led samba to the world in her films.

The samba is still one of the most popular music styles in Brazil despite its extensive history. Its origins can be traced back to the 19th century in Salvador, Bahia which had strong links with western Africa and a contained a large black slave and ex-slave population. After the abolition of slavery, many immigrated to Rio de Janeiro in order to start a new life. The hillside neighbourhoods known as "Little Africa" were where samba flourished. Despite much initial distaste for the genre from the Brazilian government and those of high social class (who were striving for a more European culture), "sambistas" continued playing, singing, and dancing the samba. From intimate samba-canções (samba songs) sung in bars to explosive drum parades performed during carnival, samba always evokes a warm and vibrant mood. In the 1930s, a group of musicians led by Ismael Silva founded in the neighborhood of Estácio de Sá the first samba school, Deixa Falar. During this period "blocos de carnaval"(groups of black individuals from the favelas, hillside slums, who came together to dance and sing samba during carnaval time) were being targeted by police for causing too much agitation with their performances. By creating organized institutions these people were able to find solace and protection in this newly legitimized practice. These samba schools gave many living in the slums a purpose in life, furthering the genre and dance's importance to many Brazilians. They transformed the musical genre to make it fit better the carnival parade. In this decade, the radio spread the genre's popularity all around the country. The song Pelo Telefone by Donga and Mauro de Almeida is the first song to really skyrocket Samba's appeal and acclaim in Brazil. The nationalist and populist dictatorship of Getúlio Vargas used samba (inspired by the ideas of Gilberto Freyre) in creating a homogenous national culture, and many samba songs broadcast on the radio were censored to ensure the regime's nationalist messages were being diffused.

In the following years, samba has developed in several directions, from the gentle samba-canção to the drum orchestras which make the soundtrack of carnival parade. One of these new styles was bossa nova, a musical movement initially spearheaded by young musicians and college students from Rio de Janeiro. It got increasingly popular over time, with the works of João Gilberto and Antonio Carlos Jobim. In the sixties, Brazil was politically divided, and the leftist musicians of bossa nova started to draw attention to the music made in the favelas. Many popular artists were discovered at this time. Names like Cartola, Nelson Cavaquinho, Velha Guarda da Portela, Zé Keti, and Clementina de Jesus recorded their first albums. In the seventies, the samba got back to radio. Composers and singers like Martinho da Vila, Clara Nunes, and Beth Carvalho dominated the hit parade.

=== Frevo ===
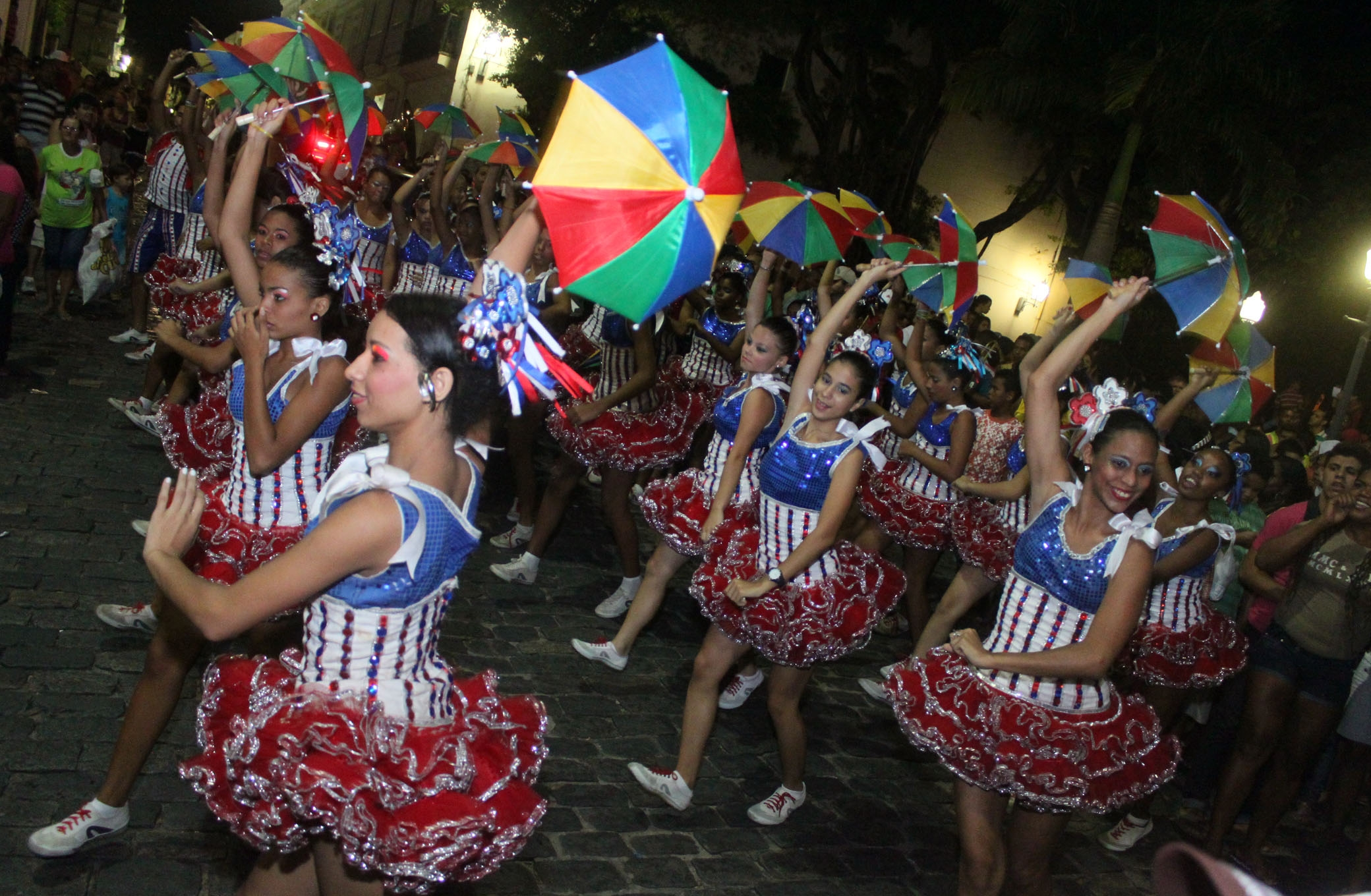
Frevo dancers. The Frevo was included on the UNESCO's list of intangible heritage.

Frevo is a wide range of musical styles originating from Recife and Olinda, Pernambuco, Brazil, all of which are traditionally associated with Brazilian Carnival. The word frevo is said to come from frever, a misspeaking of the Portuguese word ferver (to boil). It is said that the sound of the frevo will make listeners and dancers to feel as they are boiling on the ground. The word frevo is normally used interchangeably either to mean the frevo music or the frevo dance.

The frevo music came first, which is carnival music played by brass or wind marching bands combined with parts of the samba school drumline. By the end of the 19th century, bands from the Brazilian Army regiments based in the city of Recife started a tradition of parading during the Carnival. Since the Carnival is originally linked to religion, they played religious procession marches and martial music, as well. A couple of regiments had famous bands that attracted many followers and it was just a matter of time to people start to compare one to another and cheer for their favorite bands. The two most famous bands were the Espanha (meaning Spain), whose conductor was of Spanish origin, and the 14, from the 14th regiment. The bands started to compete with each other and also started playing faster and faster, louder and louder.

=== Axé ===
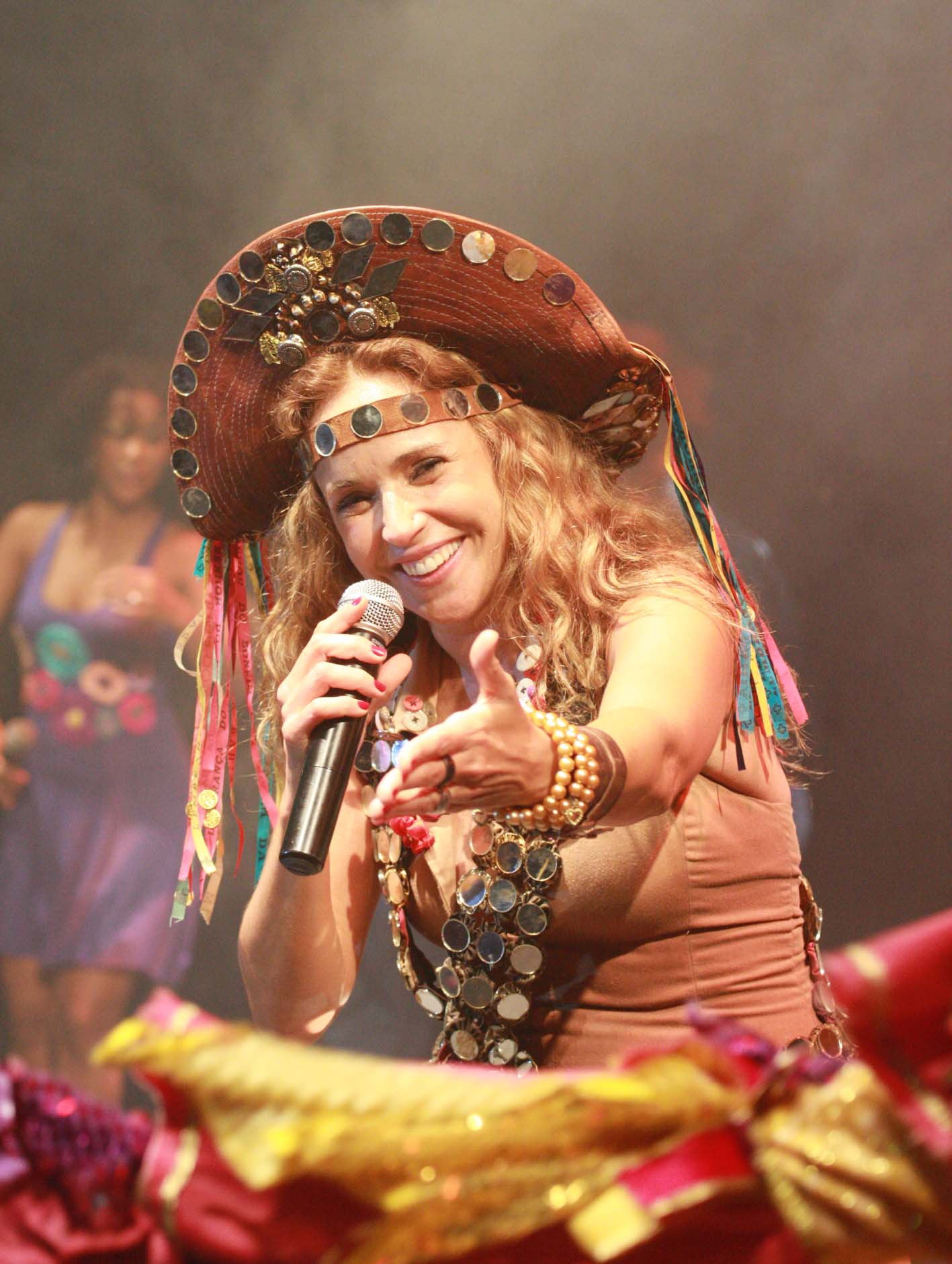
The Brazilian axé singer Daniela Mercury.

As singer Daniela Mercury began her rise to stardom in Rio and São Paulo, anything coming from Salvador would be labeled Axé Music. Soon, the artists became oblivious to the derogatory origins of the term and started taking advantage of it. With the media pushing it forward, the soundtrack of Carnival in Salvador quickly spread over the country (through off-season Carnival shindigs), strengthening its industrial potentials and producing year-round hits along the 90s.

Tested within the height of Carnival heat, Axé songs have been commercially successful in Brazil throughout the past decade. The year 1998 was particularly fortunate for the artists from Bahia: together, Daniela Mercury, Claudia Leitte, Ivete Sangalo, Asa de Aguia, Chiclete com Banana, Araketu, Cheiro de Amor, and É o Tchan sold over 3.4 million records.

== TV broadcasting ==
The Brazilian Carnival Parades were first broadcast in the late 1960s on television on Rede Globo, which brought the Rio celebrations live, bringing the celebrations to more people all over the nation. By the 1970s, color broadcasting and satellite transmissions made the broadcasts to be beamed to other parts of the nation in real-time, by then featuring the top schools under, since 1984 the Liga Independente das Escolas de Samba do Rio de Janeiro – also known as the Special Group (since 1990), and formerly under the Associação das Escolas de Samba da Cidade do Rio de Janeiro. The now-defunct Rede Manchete broadcast the event on several occasions and mounted a joint broadcast with Globo for the 1987 event.

Since 1991, Globo's broadcast of the parades, now dubbed Globeleza, at the Sambodrome in Rio and São Paulo have become the center of national and international attention. Until 2017, fans of the samba schools on parade also expected to watch a short preview of the performances of the schools involved to be broadcast during the duration of the event. By 2018 lyric video style adverts appeared in their place, complete with the colours of the competing schools in attendance, featuring the lyrics of the songs to be performed by the schools. In 2023, these were replaced with fragments of the official MTVs of the official songs of the event.

Globo acquired also the rights to air the parade of samba schools of São Paulo in 1990, and victory parades there were later aired in other local TV channels. Parades belonging to the Access Group (5th Division) and the B Series schools in Rio were also broadcast on several TV stations and are still the case today (in 2015 Rede Record and NGT aired the parades of the lower-level schools). Since 2014, Globo also has full rights to the A Series (Rio) and Paulista parades, which were co-shared with the Viva Channel before its closure in 2015 (which aired lower-level parades and the victory parades of the two cities' winning schools for the year) and regionally, RBS airs the Carnivals of Florianopólis and Porto Alegre, and since 2015, cable channel TVCOM display the gaucho parades in the south. The Rio parade can also be heard on radio and seen via online streaming as well (thru TVG Rio and from 2015 in G1, which offers an online live streaming of the victory parade). In 2023, Rede Bandeirantes took over the broadcasting rights for the Gold Series.

The Carnivals of Recife and Salvador are shown by Band since the early 2000s, and Band also holds broadcast rights for the victory parade. Both fall under the Band Folia brand. This is also the case for SBT which also broadcasts the events under the SBT Folia banner and is also, since recently, seen via live streaming on YouTube. Since 2008, Globo also has its own broadcast team and crew for the broadcasts of the late night Galo da Madrugada in Recife.

== In popular culture ==
=== Film ===
- Black Orpheus, by Marcel Camus (1959), transposes the Greek myth of Eurydice to the carnival of Rio de Janeiro.
- Apaixonados, by Paulo Fontenelle (2016), tells the story of three couples who meet during Rio de Janeiro's Carnival.
- Orfeu, by Cacá Diegues (1999), also adapts the Greek myth of Eurydice to the Rio Carnival.
- Jonas (2016), by Lô Politi, tells the story of a young man who kidnaps the daughter of his mother's employer, with whom he has always been in love, and keeps her inside a carnival float shaped like a whale, in São Paulo.

The movie Rio about Blu the blue macaw takes place during carnaval season in Rio de Janeiro.

=== Literature ===
- The novel A Moreninha, by Joaquim Manuel de Macedo (1844), tells a love story set during Carnival on Ilha de Paquetá.
- O cortiço, de Aluísio Azevedo, retrata o carnaval do Rio de Janeiro no século XIX.
- The poetry collection Carnaval, by Manuel Bandeira (1919), gathers poems on the theme.
- The first novel by Jorge Amado, O País do Carnaval (1931), tells the story of a Brazilian intellectual educated in Europe who rejects the carnival culture.
- Dona Flor and Her Two Husbands, by Jorge Amado (1966), begins during Carnival in Salvador.
- The plot of the novel O Grande Dia (The Big Day) by Swiss writer Pierre Cormon (2024), revolves around a parade of the fictional samba school Unidos de Madureira.

== Twinning ==
- Santa Cruz de Tenerife, Spain; Since 1984, Rio de Janeiro is twinned with the city of Santa Cruz de Tenerife for the special link between the Carnival of Rio and the Carnival of Santa Cruz de Tenerife.

== See also ==
- Micareta, an off-season celebration similar to Carnival
