= Micareta =

Celebrations in several cities of Brazil

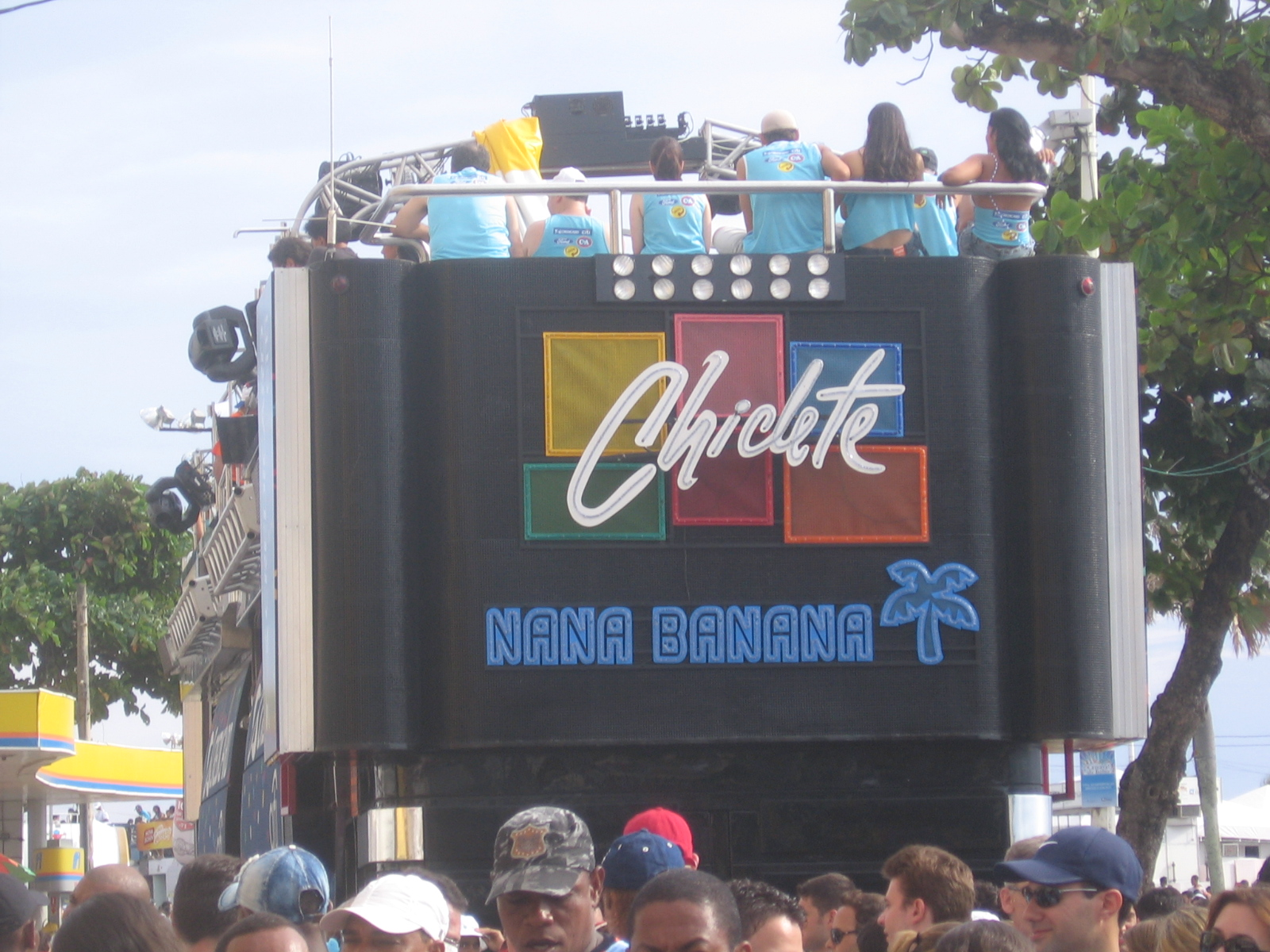
NanaBanana

Micaretas are off-season celebrations similar to Brazilian Carnival. The micaretas are similar to the Bahian Carnival and very different from the samba school parades that are popular in Rio de Janeiro. The central feature of a micareta is a large truck called a "trio elétrico." The trio elétrico is wired with loudspeakers and has a band performing on the truck's trailer. The truck drives slowly along the streets or sits parked in an enclosed space and a crowd follows the trio elétrico singing, dancing, and jumping to the sound of the music. To be allowed to follow the truck, one must buy admittance to one of the several "blocos" (block). A bloco is an enterprise which obtains permission to participate in the micareta, hires the band, sells admittance, and controls access.

Brazil has several micaretas that take place throughout the year in various cities. They are conducted either in the streets (traditional micareta) or in enclosed spaces (indoor micareta). The first micareta took place in Feira de Santana, the second largest city of the state of Bahia. That micareta started because rain destroyed what had been prepared to celebrate carnival. Following the cancellation of their Carnival celebrations, the city's inhabitants celebrated a micareta at a later date. The resulting Micareta de Feira is one of the most important micaretas of Brazil. Carnatal is the largest micareta in Brazil. It is held annually in December in the city of Natal in the state of Rio Grande do Norte.
