= Trio elétrico =

Brazilian carnival float

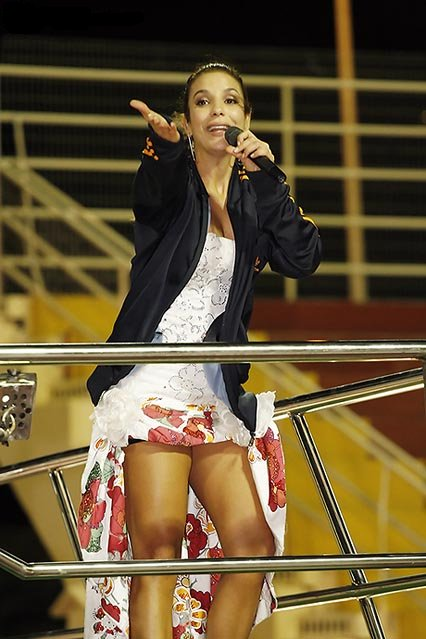
Brazilian singer Ivete Sangalo singing on top of a trio elétrico

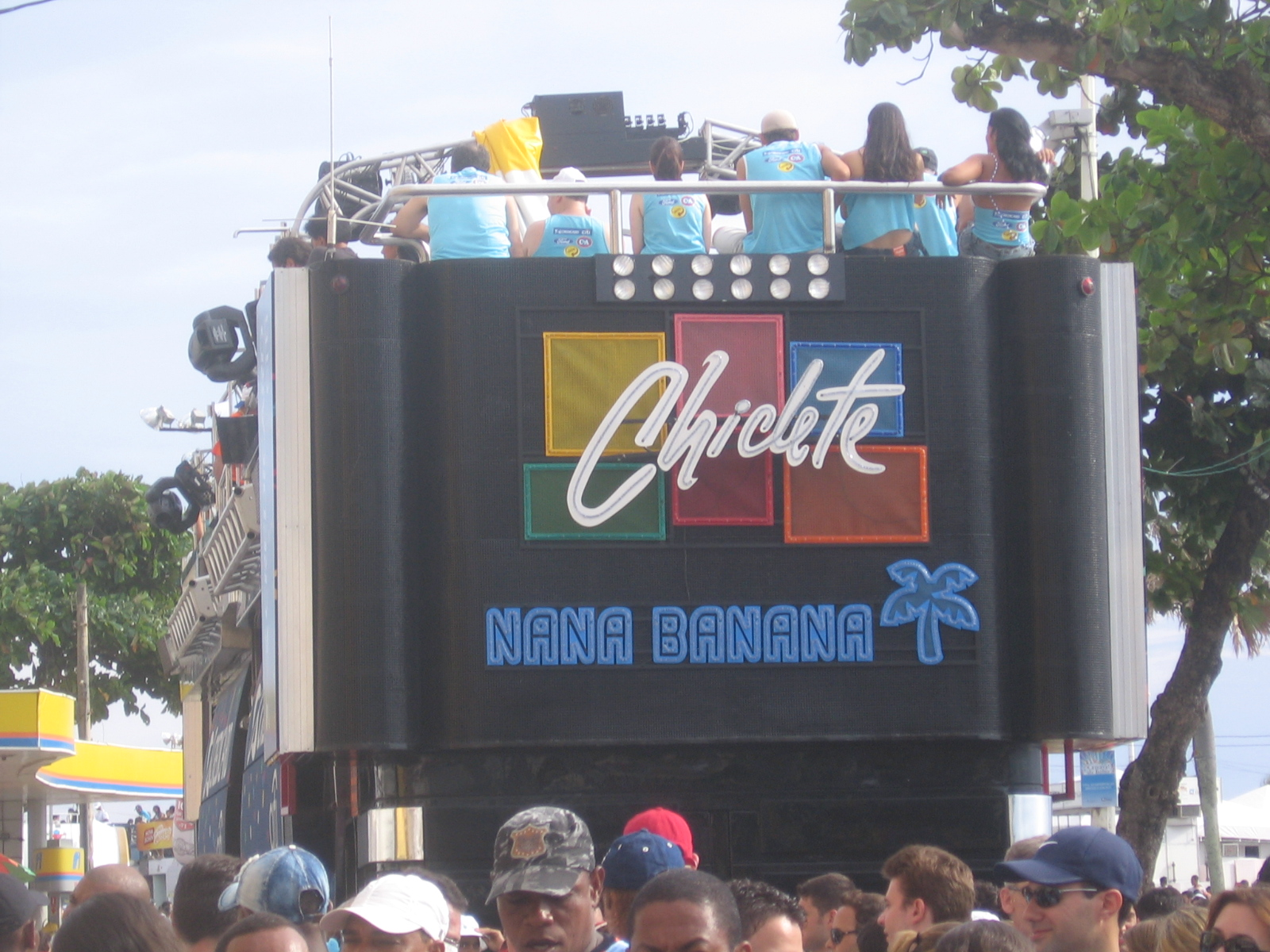
Trio elétrico

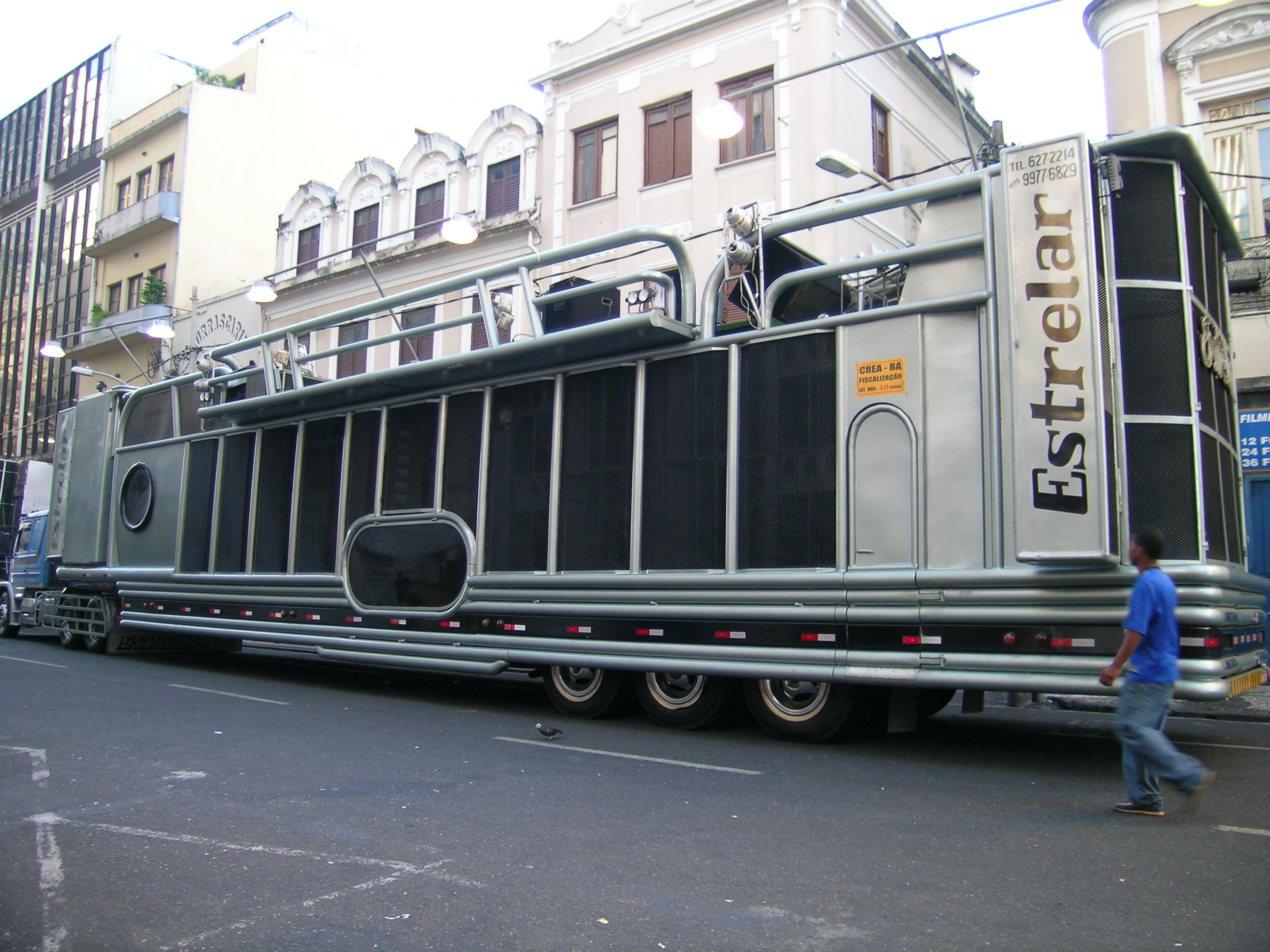
Trio elétrico of Carnaval Bahia, in Salvador, Brazil, prior to decoration

Trio elétrico (Portuguese pronunciation: [ˈtɾiw eˈlɛtɾiku], electric trio) is a kind of truck or float equipped with a high-power sound system and a stage for music performance on the top, playing for the crowd as it drives through the cities. It was created in Bahia specifically for Carnival and it is now used in similar events in other districts and countries. This setup is used in Brazilian Carnival inside the blocos carnavalescos and other festivals in Brazil, specially in micaretas. The idea was introduced in 1949 during a carnival in Bahia by the duo Dodô e Osmar (Adolfo Nascimento and Osmar Macedo).

Some Brazilian artists have been known to sing on a Trio, such as Elba Ramalho, Daniela Mercury, Ivete Sangalo, Saulo Fernandes, Cláudia Leitte, Carlinhos Brown (from Timbalada), Asa de Águia and Chiclete com Banana.

== History ==
The trio elétrico arises from the "dupla eletrica" ("Electric Duo"), composed of the two friends Adolfo Antônio Nascimento (Dodô) and Osmar Álvares de Macêdo. In 1950, the two used a Ford Model T to perform their self-made electric instrument, known as pau eletrico (electric log), during Bahia carnival. They drove through the streets playing music powered by the car battery. The show took place in the city centre on carnival Sunday and attracted a large crowd.

The name "trio elétrico" was coined in 1951 when Dodô and Osmar invited a friend to perform with them, the architect Temístocles Aragão, turning their dupla into a trio. They played through Salvador in a Chrysler pick-up. Though the name originally referred to the band, it became better known for their invention of a motorized band stage.

Another invention from Bahia, the "micaretas" (an out-of-season Carnival) began using the trios or floats. Today, there is a huge industry for the production, maintenance and leasing of trios. Many new artists are discovered on trios.

In 1983, a trio built in Italy was inaugurated in Piazza Navona in the presence of 80 thousand people who danced to the electric sound of Dodô, Osmar and Armandinho. That was the first time a trio was featured out of Brazil.

In 1985, invited by students of the University of Toulouse, in France, Armandinho, Dodô and Osmar traveled once more to Europe to take some of Carnival to more than 100 thousand people in Toulouse.

The trio is known worldwide as one of the symbols of Brazilian culture, its music and its Carnival.
