= Hanson discography =

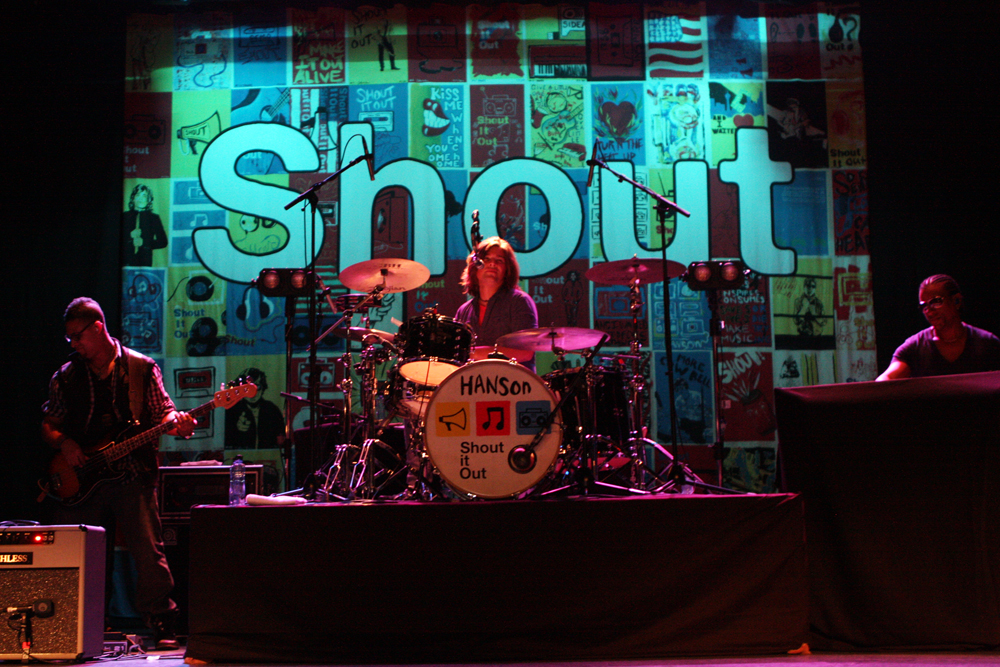
- Hanson performing in 2010
- Studio albums: 12
- Extended plays: 27
- Live albums: 4
- Compilation albums: 6
- Singles: 34
- Music videos: 26
- Demo albums: 2

The discography of Hanson, an American pop rock band. They are best known for the 1997 hit song "MMMBop" from their major label debut album Middle of Nowhere, which earned three Grammy nominations. Despite the enormous commercial success of Middle of Nowhere, the band suffered from the merger that eliminated their label, Mercury Records.

The group was moved to Island Def Jam Music Group, which they eventually left after conflict with the label about creative input. Hanson has sold over 16 million records worldwide and have had eight top 40 albums and three top 40 singles in the US, as well as eight top 40 singles in the UK. The band now records under its own label, 3CG Records.

== Albums ==
=== Studio albums ===
List of albums, with selected chart positions and certifications
Title	Album details	Peak chart positions										Certifications
Title	Album details	US	AUS	CAN	FRA	GER	NL	NZ	SWE	SWI	UK	Certifications
Middle of Nowhere	Released: May 6, 1997; Label: Mercury; Formats: CD, cassette	2	1	4	15	1	5	4	4	2	1	RIAA: 4× Platinum; ARIA: 5× Platinum; CRIA: 5× Platinum; BPI: Gold; BVMI: Gold; IFPI SWI: Platinum
Snowed In	Released: November 18, 1997; Label: Mercury; Formats: CD, cassette	7	3	14	—	65	32	12	14	20	87	RIAA: Platinum; ARIA: 2× Platinum; CRIA: Platinum
This Time Around	Released: May 9, 2000; Label: Island; Formats: CD, cassette	19	11	12	50	54	71	21	9	30	33	RIAA: Gold
Underneath	Released: April 20, 2004; Label: 3CG; Formats: CD, digital download	25	—	56	173	—	—	—	—	—	49	
The Walk	Released: July 24, 2007; Label: 3CG; Formats: CD, digital download	56	—	—	—	—	—	—	—	—	83	
Shout It Out	Released: June 8, 2010; Label: 3CG; Formats: CD, digital download, 12" vinyl	30	—	—	—	—	—	—	—	—	—	
Anthem	Released: June 18, 2013; Label: 3CG; Formats: CD, digital download, 12" vinyl	22	65	—	—	—	—	—	—	—	—	
Finally It's Christmas	Released: October 27, 2017; Label: 3CG/S-Curve; Formats: CD, digital download	81	7	—	—	—	—	— (Note: Finally It's Christmas did not enter the NZ Top 40 Albums Chart, but peaked at number four on the NZ Heatseeker Albums Chart.)	—	—	—	
String Theory	Released: November 9, 2018; Label: 3CG; Formats: CD, digital download, 12" vinyl	—	— (Note: String Theory did not chart on the Australian ARIA Albums Chart, but peaked at number 19 on the ARIA Digital Albums Chart.)	—	—	—	—	—	—	—	—	
Against the World	Released: November 5, 2021; Label: 3CG; Formats: CD, 12" vinyl, digital download,	—	—	—	—	—	—	—	—	—	—	
Red Green Blue	Released: May 20, 2022; Label: 3CG; Formats: CD, 12" vinyl, digital download	—	—	—	—	—	—	—	—	—	—	
Underneath: Complete	Released: October 4, 2024; Label: 3CG; Formats: CD, 12" vinyl, digital download,	—	—	—	—	—	—	—	—	—	—	
"—" denotes a recording that did not chart or was not released in that territory.

=== Live albums ===
List of albums, with selected chart positions and certifications
Title	Album details	Peak chart positions				Certifications
Title	Album details	US	AUS	NZ	UK	Certifications
Live from Albertane	Released: November 3, 1998; Label: Mercury; Formats: CD, cassette	32	21	43	129	RIAA: Gold
The Best of Hanson: Live & Electric	Released: October 11, 2005; Label: 3CG; Formats: CD, digital download	182	93	—	—	
Middle of Nowhere Acoustic	Released: December 12, 2007; Label: 3CG; Formats: CD, digital download	—	—	—	—	
Facing the Blank Page – Live	Released: 2012; Label: 3CG; Formats: CD, digital download	—	—	—	—	
"—" denotes a recording that did not chart or was not released in that territory.

=== Demo albums ===
List of demo albums
Title	Album details
Boomerang	Released: May 17, 1995; Label: Independent; Formats: CD, cassette
MMMBop	Released: March 17, 1996; Label: Independent; Formats: CD, cassette

=== Compilation albums ===
List of albums, with selected chart positions and certifications
Title	Album details	Peak chart positions								Certifications
Title	Album details	US	AUS	CAN	GER	NLD	NZ	SWE	UK	Certifications
3 Car Garage	Released: May 12, 1998; Label: Mercury; Formats: CD, cassette	6	3	6	51	47	11	7	39	RIAA: Platinum; ARIA: Gold
MMMBop: The Collection	Released: November 28, 2005; Label: Spectrum; Format: CD, digital download	—	—	—	—	—	—	—	—	
20th Century Masters – The Millennium Collection: The Best of Hanson	Released: May 16, 2006; Label: Mercury; Format: CD, digital download	—	—	—	—	—	—	—	—	
Loud / Play	Released: November 15, 2016; Label: 3CG; Format: CD, 12" vinyl, digital download	—	—	—	—	—	—	—	—	
Middle of Everywhere: The Greatest Hits	Released: September 8, 2017; Label: 3CG; Formats: CD, cassette, 12" vinyl, digital download	—	—	—	—	—	—	—	—	
Perennial: A Hanson Net Collection	Release: November 6, 2020; Label: 3CG; Formats: CD, 12" vinyl, digital download	—	—	—	—	—	—	—	—	
"—" denotes a recording that did not chart or was not released in that territory.

== Extended plays ==
In June 2020, with the relaunch of the hanson.net website, official names were given to most of the 2003-2010 EPs that were previously only known by the year or website version they were released under. Those names are notated below.

Title	EP details
Underneath Acoustic	Released: August 9, 2003; Label: 3CG; Formats: CD, digital download
Hanson.net Version 2.0: Members EP 2003 / Watch Me Bleed	Released: 2003; Label: 3CG; Formats: CD, digital download
Hanson.net Version 2.2: Members EP 2005 / Never Let Go	Released: 2005; Label: 3CG; Formats: CD, digital download
Hanson.net Version 2.3: Members EP 2006	Released: 2006; Label: 3CG; Formats: CD, digital download
Hanson.net Version 3.0: Members EP 2007 / Watershed	Released: 2007; Label: 3CG; Formats: CD, digital download
Members EP 2008 / Leave the Light On	Released: 2008; Label: 3CG; Formats: CD, digital download
Members EP 2009 / Fools Gold	Released: 2009; Label: 3CG; Formats: CD, digital download
Stand Up, Stand Up	Released: December 7, 2009; Label: 3CG; Format: CD, digital download
Members EP 2010 / Time & Trouble	Released: 2010; Label: 3CG; Formats: CD, digital download
Facing the Blank Page	Released: 2011; Label: 3CG; Format: CD, digital download
No Sleep for Banditos	Released: 2012; Label: 3CG; Format: CD, digital download
Digital Pants	Released: 2012; Label: 3CG; Format: digital download
The Sound of Light	Released: July 2013; Label: 3CG; Format: CD, digital download
Music Made for Humans	Released: May 2014; Label: 3CG; Format: CD, digital download
Inside the Box	Released: May 18, 2015; Label: 3CG; Format: CD, digital download
Roots & Rock 'n' Roll	Released: October 2, 2015; Label: 3CG; Format: CD, digital download
Loud	Released: May 2016; Label: 3CG; Format: CD, digital download
Play	Released: October 10, 2016; Label: 3CG; Format: CD, digital download
Super Digital Pants	Released: 2016; Label: 3CG; Format: digital download
In Color	Released: May 19, 2017; Label: 3CG; Format: CD, digital download
Animal Instincts	Released: May 2018; Label: 3CG; Format: CD, digital download
In Real Life	Released: May 2019; Label: 3CG; Format: CD, digital download
Continental Breakfast (In Bed)	Released: July 2020; Label: 3CG; Format: CD, digital download
Crossroads	Released: May 2021; Label: 3CG; Format: CD, digital download
White Rabbit	Released: May 2022; Label: 3CG; Format: CD, digital download
Ambient	Released: May 2023; Label: 3CG; Format: Digital download
Time Machine	Released: May 2024; Label: 3CG; Format: Digital download

== Singles ==
=== As main artist ===
List of singles, with selected chart positions and certifications, showing year released and album name
Title	Year	Peak chart positions										Certifications	Album
Title	Year	US	AUS	CAN	FRA	GER	NLD	NZ	SWE	SWI	UK	Certifications	Album
"MMMBop"	1997	1	1	1	4	1	2	1	1	1	1	RIAA: Platinum; ARIA: 2× Platinum; BPI: Platinum; BVMI: Platinum; IFPI SWE: Platinum; IFPI SWI: Gold	Middle of Nowhere
"Where's the Love"	1997	— (Note: "Where's the Love" did not enter the Billboard Hot 100, but peaked at number 27 on the Hot 100 Airplay chart.)	2	2	37	52	31	5	23	24	4	ARIA: Platinum; BPI: Silver	Middle of Nowhere
"I Will Come to You"	1997	9	2	11	10	36	12	3	1	9	5	RIAA: Gold; ARIA: Platinum	Middle of Nowhere
"Weird"	1998	—	12	11	80	—	72	10	21	—	19	ARIA: Gold	Middle of Nowhere
"Thinking of You"	1998	—	6	—	—	—	—	27	—	—	23	ARIA: Gold; BPI: Platinum	Middle of Nowhere
"Gimme Some Lovin'"	1999	—	—	—	—	—	—	20	—	—	—		Jack Frost
"This Time Around"	2000	20	42	13	—	—	—	—	—	—	—	RIAA: Gold	This Time Around
"If Only"	2000	—	9	—	87	68	38	27	13	47	15	ARIA: Gold	This Time Around
"Save Me"	2000	—	—	—	—	—	—	—	—	—	—		This Time Around
"Love Somebody to Know"	2004	—	—	—	—	—	—	—	—	—	—		Underneath Acoustic
"Penny & Me"	2004	—	65	—	—	99	94	—	—	—	10		Underneath
"Someone" (featuring Emma Daumas)	2005	—	—	—	—	—	—	—	—	—	—		Underneath
"Lost Without Each Other"	2005	—	73	—	—	—	—	—	—	—	39		Underneath
"Crazy Beautiful"	2005	—	—	—	—	—	—	—	—	—	—		Underneath
"Great Divide"	2006	—	—	—	—	—	—	—	—	—	—		The Walk
"Go"	2007	—	—	—	—	—	—	—	—	—	44		The Walk
"Thinking 'Bout Somethin'"	2010	—	—	—	—	—	—	—	—	—	—		Shout It Out
"Give a Little"	2011	—	—	—	—	—	—	—	—	—	—		Shout It Out
"Get the Girl Back"	2013	—	—	—	—	—	—	—	—	—	—		Anthem
"Finally It's Christmas"	2014	—	—	—	—	—	—	—	—	—	—		Finally It's Christmas
"I Was Born"	2017	—	—	—	—	—	—	—	—	—	—		Middle of Everywhere – The Greatest Hits
"Siren Call"	2018	—	—	—	—	—	—	—	—	—	—		String Theory
"Better Days"	2019	—	—	—	—	—	—	—	—	—	—		Perennial: A Hanson Net Collection
"Nothing Like a Love Song"	2020	—	—	—	—	—	—	—	—	—	—		Perennial: A Hanson Net Collection
"Annalie"	2021	—	—	—	—	—	—	—	—	—	—		Against the World
"Don't Ever Change"	2021	—	—	—	—	—	—	—	—	—	—		Against the World
"Only Love"	2021	—	—	—	—	—	—	—	—	—	—		Against the World
"Against the World"	2021	—	—	—	—	—	—	—	—	—	—		Against the World
"Stronger"	2021	—	—	—	—	—	—	—	—	—	—		Against the World
"One"	2021	—	—	—	—	—	—	—	—	—	—		Against the World
"Fearless"	2021	—	—	—	—	—	—	—	—	—	—		Against the World
"Child at Heart"	2022	—	—	—	—	—	—	—	—	—	—		Red Green Blue
"Write You a Song"	2022	—	—	—	—	—	—	—	—	—	—		Red Green Blue
"Don't Let Me Down" (featuring Zach Myers)	2022	—	—	—	—	—	—	—	—	—	—		Red Green Blue
"MMMBop 2.0" (with Busted)	2023	—	—	—	—	—	—	—	—	—	— (Note: "MMMBop 2.0" did not enter the UK Singles Chart, but peaked at number 10 on the UK Singles Sales Chart.)		Non-album single
"—" denotes a recording that did not chart or was not released in that territory.

=== As featured artist ===
List of singles as featured artist
Title	Year	Album
"Unbelievable" (Owl City featuring Hanson)	2015	Mobile Orchestra
"Top of the World" (Blues Traveler featuring Hanson)	2015	Blow Up the Moon
"It's OK" (Mike Love featuring Hanson)	2018	Non-album single
"Material Girl" (Awolnation featuring Taylor Hanson of Hanson)	2022	My Echo, My Shadow, My Covers & Me

=== Promotional singles ===
List of promotional singles
Title	Year	Album
"Christmas Time"	1997	Snowed In
"Furry Walls"	2010	Non-album single
