= MMMBop: The Collection =

MMMBop: the Collection

Greatest hits album by Hanson
- Released: 2005
- Recorded: 1996 – 1999
- Genre: Pop rock
- Label: Spectrum Music
- Producer: Various

Hanson chronology
| The Best of Hanson: Live & Electric (2005) | MMMBop: the Collection (2005) | The Walk (2007) |

MMMBop: The Collection is a 2005 compilation album by Hanson on the Spectrum label, owned by Universal Records. Released in Europe, it is composed of 17 previously released tracks from the albums Middle of Nowhere, Snowed In, Live from Albertane and This Time Around.

The compilation garnered some controversy due to its release around the time of Hanson's documentary "Strong Enough to Break," which chronicled the troubles Hanson encountered in trying to release their third album before leaving Island (Hanson's former label Mercury had been merged into Island, which is owned by Universal, the distributor of this compilation.)

== Track listing ==
1. "MMMBop" (I. Hanson, T. Hanson, Z. Hanson) - 4:29 from Middle of Nowhere
2. "Where's the Love" (I. Hanson, T. Hanson, Z. Hanson) - 4:14 from Middle of Nowhere
3. "I Will Come to You" (I. Hanson, T. Hanson, Z. Hanson, Barry Mann, Cynthia Weil) - 4:12 from Middle of Nowhere
4. "Weird" (I. Hanson, T. Hanson, Z. Hanson, Desmond Child) - 4:03 from Middle of Nowhere
5. "Thinking of You" (I. Hanson, T. Hanson, Z. Hanson) - 3:15 from Middle of Nowhere
6. "If Only" (I. Hanson, T. Hanson, Z. Hanson) - 4:32 from This Time Around
7. "Smile" (I. Hanson, T. Hanson, Z. Hanson) - 3:18 from This Time Around
8. "Gimme Some Lovin'/Shake A Tail Feather" [Live] (Steve Winwood, Spencer Davis, Muff Winwood/Otha Hayes, Verlie Rice, Andre Williams) - 5:08 from Live from Albertane
9. "Money (That's What I Want)" [Live] (Janie Bradford, Berry Gordy) - 2:16 from Live from Albertane
10. "Man From Milwaukee" (I. Hanson, T. Hanson, Z. Hanson) - 3:40 from Middle of Nowhere
11. "Cried" (I. Hanson, T. Hanson, Z. Hanson, Mark Hudson) - 3:35 [mis-labeled as "Cry"] B-Side from I Will Come to You single
12. "Can't Stop" (I. Hanson, T. Hanson, Z. Hanson) - 4:27 from This Time Around
13. "Sure About It" (I. Hanson, T. Hanson, Z. Hanson) - 3:29 from This Time Around
14. "This Time Around" (I. Hanson, T. Hanson, Z. Hanson) - 4:19 from This Time Around
15. "Little Saint Nick" (Brian Wilson, Mike Love) - 3:35 from Snowed In
16. "Merry Christmas Baby" (Lou Baxter, Johnny Moore) - 3:14 from Snowed In
17. "If Only" (JFP Club Mix) (I. Hanson, T. Hanson, Z. Hanson) - 5:56 Previously unreleased
