= Middle of Nowhere Acoustic =

Live album by Hanson
- Released: December 12, 2007
- Recorded: May 5, 2007
- Genre: Pop
- Label: 3CG Records

Hanson chronology
The Walk (2007)	Middle of Nowhere Acoustic (2007)	Take the Walk EP (2008)

Middle of Nowhere Acoustic is a live acoustic album and DVD by Hanson. It was recorded on May 5, 2007 to celebrate the 10th anniversary of their debut album Middle of Nowhere. The CD/DVD combo was released on December 12, 2007 via Hanson's official website.

== Track listing ==
1. "Intro" – 2:02
2. "MMMBop" – 5:11
3. "Look at You" – 4:15
4. "Weird" – 4:28
5. "Yearbook" – 5:52
6. "Madeline" – 4:31
7. "A Minute Without You" – 4:40
8. "Lucy" – 4:45
9. "Where's the Love?" – 3:51
10. "I Will Come to You" – 6:46
11. "Man from Milwaukee" – 3:42

== Recording event ==
The album and DVD were recorded in two sessions on May 5, 2007. Some fans were chosen to sit in on both recording sessions, for continuity purposes in the video. Not all aspects of the recording sessions made it to the CD/DVD – for example, the band performed the songs "Great Divide" (during both sessions) and "Something Going Round" (during the second session) off their 2007 album The Walk, but those songs were never released as a part of the Middle of Nowhere Acoustic collection. Bootleg audio recordings of these performances do exist.

After each recording session, the band took group photos with fans, and then merchandise tables were opened where fans could buy limited-edition anniversary T-shirts as well as regular Hanson merchandise, to include shirts, posters, keychains, and more. The shirts were black, with an orange and yellow design reminiscent of the design and color scheme from the Middle of Nowhere album.

== Middle of Nowhere omissions ==
The Middle of Nowhere tracks "Thinking Of You," "Speechless," and "With You In Your Dreams" were not performed.
