= Live from Albertane =

Live album by Hanson
- Released: November 3, 1998
- Recorded: July 21, 1998
- Venue: KeyArena in Seattle, Washington
- Genre: Pop
- Length: 45:10
- Label: Mercury / PolyGram
- Producer: Hanson, Elliot Scheiner

Hanson chronology
3 Car Garage (1998)	Live from Albertane (1998)	This Time Around (2000)

Professional ratings
Review scores
Source	Rating
AllMusic	2.5/5 stars
Entertainment Weekly	B−

Live from Albertane is a live album by American pop rock group Hanson recorded during the group's Albertane Tour. Albertane is a fictional place (the capital city of the planet Mars) referred to in their song "Man from Milwaukee".

The song selection mostly focuses on the Middle of Nowhere album, but also contains some older material, a new track ("Ever Lonely") and a couple of covers of classic songs.

It peaked at number 32 on the Billboard 200 in 1998.

== Track listing ==
1. "Gimme Some Lovin'"/"Shake a Tail Feather" (Davis, Winwood, Hayes, Williams, Rice) – 5:07
2. "Where's the Love" (Hanson, Hanson, Hanson, Hudson, Salover) – 4:53
3. "River" (Hanson, Hanson, Hanson) – 3:28
4. "I Will Come to You" (Hanson, Hanson, Hanson, Mann, Weil) – 4:18
5. "Ever Lonely" (Hanson, Hanson, Hanson) – 3:07
6. "Speechless" (Hanson, Hanson, Hanson, Lironi) – 3:31
7. "With You in Your Dreams" (Hanson, Hanson, Hanson) – 4:18
8. "A Minute Without You" (Hanson, Hanson, Hanson, Hudson) – 3:34
9. "Money (That's What I Want)" (Bradford, Gordy) – 2:17
10. "More Than Anything" (Hanson, Hanson, Hanson) – 4:20
11. "MMMBop" (Hanson, Hanson, Hanson) – 4:11
12. "Man from Milwaukee" (Hanson, Hanson, Hanson) – 4:00

== Personnel ==
- C. Taylor Crothers – photography
- Hanson – producer
- Isaac Hanson – guitar, piano, vocals
- Taylor Hanson – keyboards, vocals
- Zac Hanson – drums, percussion, vocals
- Ted Jensen – digital editing
- Rob Mounsey – post-production editor
- Elliot Scheiner – producer, engineer, mixing
- Steve Smith – assistant engineer
- Shari Sutcliffe – production co-ordination
- Jason Taylor – guitar
- Scott Hogan – bass guitar
- Matt Rhode – piano, organ

== Certifications ==
Region	Certification	Certified units/sales
United States (RIAA)	Gold	500,000^{^}
^{^} Shipments figures based on certification alone.
