= 3 Car Garage =

3 Car Garage: The Indie Recordings

Demo album (reissue) by Hanson
- Released: May 12, 1998
- Recorded: 1995
- Genre: Pop rock
- Length: 44:52
- Label: Mercury / PolyGram
- Producer: Hanson

Hanson chronology
Snowed In (1997)	3 Car Garage: The Indie Recordings (1998)	Live from Albertane (1998)

Professional ratings
Review scores
Source	Rating
AllMusic	3/5 stars
Entertainment Weekly	C+
The Rolling Stone Album Guide	2.5/5 stars

3 Car Garage: The Indie Recordings '95–'96, also known simply as 3 Car Garage, is a reissue by American pop rock group Hanson, consisting of material from their MMMBop demo album minus four tracks.

The album also contains the original version of the hit song "MMMBop", which was a rock ballad, unlike the up-tempo pop version that became a hit.

== Track listing ==
All tracks are written by Hanson.

No.	Title	Lead vocals	Length
1.	"Day Has Come"	Isaac Hanson	4:46
2.	"Two Tears"	Isaac Hanson	2:40
3.	"Thinking of You" (1996 version)	Taylor Hanson	3:10
4.	"River"	Isaac Hanson	3:46
5.	"Surely as the Sun"	Isaac Hanson	5:40
6.	"MMMBop" (original version)	Taylor Hanson	5:16
7.	"Soldier"	Isaac Hanson	6:13
8.	"Stories"	Taylor Hanson	2:34
9.	"Pictures"	Isaac Hanson	2:12
10.	"Sometimes"	Isaac Hanson	4:25
11.	"With You in Your Dreams" (1996 version)	Taylor Hanson	4:12

== Personnel ==
- John Chambers – guitar
- JaMarc Davis – guitar
- Louis Drapp – bass, guitar, harmonica
- Isaac Hanson – guitar, fiddle, piano, producer, sequencing, vocals
- Taylor Hanson – piano, keyboards, conga, drums, producer, vocals
- Walker Hanson – photography
- Zac Hanson – drums, vocals, producer
- Craig Harmon – Hammond organ
- Lewis Harris – bass
- Dan Hersch – mastering
- Dana Higbee – piccolo
- Bill Inglot – mastering
- Stirling McIlwaine – photography
- John Morand – engineer

== Charts ==
=== Weekly charts ===
Chart (1998)	Peak position
Australian Albums (ARIA)	3
Belgian Albums (Ultratop Flanders)	19
Canadian Albums (Billboard)	6
Dutch Albums (Album Top 100)	47
European Top 100 Albums (Music & Media)	47
Finnish Albums (Suomen virallinen lista)	8
German Albums (Offizielle Top 100)	51
Japanese Albums (Oricon)	42
New Zealand Albums (RMNZ)	11
Scottish Albums (OCC)	60
Swedish Albums (Sverigetopplistan)	7
UK Albums (OCC)	39
US Billboard 200	6

=== Year-end charts ===
Chart (1998)	Position
Australian Albums (ARIA)	80
US Billboard 200	153

== Certifications ==
Region	Certification	Certified units/sales
Australia (ARIA)	Gold	35,000^{^}
Brazil (Pro-Música Brasil)	Gold	100,000^{*}
Canada (Music Canada)	Gold	50,000^{^}
United States (RIAA)	Platinum	1,000,000^{^}
^{*} Sales figures based on certification alone.^{^} Shipments figures based on certification alone.
