= This Time Around (Hanson album) =

Studio album by Hanson
- Released: May 9, 2000
- Recorded: June – November 1999
- Studio: Los Angeles, California
- Genre: Pop rock
- Length: 51:30
- Label: Island
- Producers: Hanson; Mark Hudson; Stephen Lironi

Hanson chronology
Live from Albertane (1998)	This Time Around (2000)	Underneath Acoustic (2003)

Alternative cover
- International cover

Singles from This Time Around
- 1. "If Only" Released: April 3, 2000; 2. "This Time Around" Released: April 4, 2000; 3. "Save Me" Released: July 15, 2000

This Time Around is the second studio album by American pop rock group Hanson, released on May 9, 2000, by Island Records. Although Hanson had several albums in between, This Time Around is their first standard studio release since 1997's Middle of Nowhere. This Time Around did not achieve the commercial success of its predecessor Middle of Nowhere. The album does not feature as many bubblegum pop style tunes as Middle of Nowhere; instead, Hanson opted to focus on a more classic rock sound, or as MTV.com stated, "stadium rock". The album also features numerous ballads, with songs such as "Sure About It" and "A Song to Sing" covering the themes of teenage insecurity and loneliness, much like "Weird" from Middle of Nowhere. Critically, This Time Around received mainly positive reviews. To date, it has sold over one million copies worldwide.

== Critical reception ==
Professional ratings
Aggregate scores
Source	Rating
Metacritic	67/100
Review scores
Source	Rating
AllMusic	4/5 stars
Billboard	(favorable)
Entertainment Weekly	B
NME	4/10
Q	3/5 stars
Robert Christgau	C−
Rolling Stone	3.5/5 stars
Wall of Sound	75/100

Critically, This Time Around received mainly positive reviews. It was given a score of 67 out of 100 by Metacritic. Billboard said, "It all adds up to a collection that successfully sets Hanson apart from the current teen-pop phenomenon that it helped start -- at least from a creative perspective," and CDNow said "This Time Around scores with more sophisticated harmonies and storytelling." Rolling Stone said, "Like a blond three-headed hydra, Hanson loom over the competition, making all other teen idols sound like Gerber-sucking clowns." AllMusic said, "It's hard not to miss the thrilling way Middle of Nowhere leapt out of the speakers upon its first spin with giddy fun, yet with its carefully considered craft and warmly ingratiating pop songs This Time Around is winning entertainment." However, not everyone was complimentary about the change in musical style, with Robert Christgau of The Village Voice stating "If you thought they were bad when they were cute, or even that they were cute when they were good, believe me, you don't want to hear them mature," and NME with the even harsher verdict: "But damn those cruel hormones – Hanson's collective balls have MmmDropped, and the giddy rush of adolescence seeks to mutate Mercury's finest investment into a trio of crack-voiced hulks."

== Singles ==
- "If Only" was released as the lead single outside the United States on April 3, 2000. The song features John Popper of the band Blues Traveler on harmonica. The music video features the group traveling in a desert on their tour bus, unloading their equipment to shoot the video. The song reached the top 10 in Australia, Finland, Italy, and Spain and entered the charts of other European countries.
- "This Time Around" was released on April 4, 2000, as the lead single in the United States and Canada, peaking at number 20 on the Billboard Hot 100. The song was also released in Australia as the second single.
- "Save Me" was released on July 15 only in United Kingdom and Brazil. The song was included in the soundtrack to the Brazilian soap opera Laços de Família (Family Ties). "Save Me" was certified gold by Pro-Música Brasil in 2024.

== Track listing ==
All songs written by Isaac Hanson, Taylor Hanson and Zac Hanson. Lead vocals by Taylor Hanson, except where noted.

No.	Title	Lead vocals	Length
1.	"You Never Know"		3:04
2.	"If Only"		4:30
3.	"This Time Around"	Taylor Hanson; Issac Hanson	4:17
4.	"Runaway Run"		3:40
5.	"Save Me"		3:40
6.	"Dying to Be Alive"		4:37
7.	"Can't Stop"		4:24
8.	"Wish That I Was There"	Zac Hanson; Taylor Hanson	3:32
9.	"Love Song"	Issac Hanson	4:06
10.	"Sure About It"		3:27
11.	"Hand in Hand"	Isaac Hanson	4:37
12.	"In the City"		3:27
13.	"Song to Sing" (hidden track)	Taylor Hanson; Isaac Hanson	3:35

In some locales two additional hidden tracks, "Smile" and "Lonely Again", were also included in the foreign version of the CD. Just like Middle of Nowhere, "A Song to Sing" is track 21 with eight tracks of silence used once again, despite some reissues dropping the silent tracks to make "A Song to Sing" track 13.

== Personnel ==
=== Hanson ===
- Taylor Hanson – piano, keyboards, harmonica, percussion, vocals
- Isaac Hanson – electric and acoustic guitars, vocals
- Zachary Hanson – drums, vocals

=== Additional personnel ===
- John Popper, Scott Gordon – harmonica
- Jonny Lang – electric guitars
- Stephen Lironi – electric guitars, organ, bass, loops
- Kevin Wyatt – bass
- Abe Laboriel, Jr. – drums, percussion
- Ged Lynch – percussion
- DJ Swamp – DJ/scratching
- Michael Fisher – percussion
- Rose Stone (also director), Lisa Banks, Alfie Silas, Carolyn, Darlene, Sharon & Lori Petty, Howard McCreary, Rick Riso, Cedric Johns – choir
- Joel Derouin – violin
- David Campbell – viola
- Larry Corbett – cello
- Strings on "Runaway Run" arranged by David Campbell

=== Production ===
- Arranged by Hanson
- Produced by Hanson and Stephen Lironi; vocals produced by Hanson and Mark Hudson
- Recording engineers – Scott Gordon (vocal engineer), Doug Trantow, Steve Churchyard ("You Never Know")
- Second engineers – Annette Cisneros, Pat Burkholder, Brent Riley, Eric Ferguson, Dave Dominguez, Elan Trujillo
- Additional Pro Tools engineering by Lars Fox
- Mixed by Tom Lord-Alge
- Mastered at Sterling Sound

== Charts ==
Chart (2000)	Peak position
Australian Albums (ARIA)	11
Canadian Albums (Billboard)	12
Dutch Albums (Album Top 100)	71
European Albums Chart	36
Finnish Albums (Suomen virallinen lista)	10
French Albums (SNEP)	50
German Albums (Offizielle Top 100)	54
Italian Albums (FIMI)	22
Italian Albums (Musica e dischi)	29
Japanese Albums (Oricon)	18
New Zealand Albums (RMNZ)	21
Norwegian Albums (VG-lista)	28
Scottish Albums (Official Charts)	36
Swedish Albums (Sverigetopplistan)	9
Swiss Albums (Schweizer Hitparade)	30
UK Albums (Official Charts)	33
US Billboard 200	19

== Certifications ==
Region	Certification	Certified units/sales
Brazil (Pro-Música Brasil)	Gold	100,000^{*}
United States (RIAA)	Gold	500,000^{^}
^{*} Sales figures based on certification alone.^{^} Shipments figures based on certification alone.
