= Against the World =

Against the World may refer to:

- Against the World (album), a studio album by Winds of Plague.
- Against the World (EP), by Kep1er
- Against the World, an album by Hanson

== See also ==
- Me Against the World (disambiguation)
- Us Against the World
