= MMMBop (album) =

Demo album by Hanson
- Released: March 20, 1996
- Recorded: Late 1995
- Studio: Louis Drapp Studio and Natura Studio, Tulsa; Mixed at Sound of Music, Richmond, Virginia
- Genre: Pop rock
- Length: 59:48
- Label: Independently released
- Producer: Hanson

Hanson chronology
Boomerang (1995)	MMMBop (1996)	Middle of Nowhere (1997)

MMMBop is a demo album by American pop rock group Hanson, released in 1996 independently after Boomerang. It contains a few tracks that were later re-recorded for their debut studio album Middle of Nowhere.

== Track listing ==
All tracks are written by Isaac Hanson, Taylor Hanson and Zac Hanson.

No.	Title	Length
1.	"Day Has Come"	4:51
2.	"Thinking of You"	3:15
3.	"Two Tears"	2:44
4.	"Stories"	2:37
5.	"River"	3:50
6.	"Surely as the Sun"	5:43
7.	"Something New"	2:44
8.	"MMMBop"	3:54
9.	"Soldier"	6:16
10.	"Pictures"	2:18
11.	"Incredible"	4:22
12.	"With You in Your Dreams"	4:17
13.	"Sometimes"	4:28
14.	"Baby (You're So Fine)"	3:22
15.	"MMMBop" (long version)	5:07
