= Boomerang (Hanson album) =

Demo album by Hanson
- Released: May 17, 1995
- Recorded: Autumn 1994
- Studio: Nashville, Tennessee and Chicago, Illinois
- Genre: Pop
- Length: 33:00
- Label: Independently released
- Producer: Hanson

Hanson chronology
Boomerang (1995)	MMMBop (1996)

Boomerang is a demo album by American pop rock group Hanson, released in March 1995. The album contains the original version of the song "More Than Anything", of which a live version was later included on the 1998 album Live from Albertane. The song "Lonely Boy" includes a short sample of "I'll Be There" by The Jackson 5.

== Track listing ==
All tracks are written by Isaac Hanson, Taylor Hanson and Zac Hanson, except where noted.

No.	Title	Writer(s)	Length
1.	"Boomerang"		3:06
2.	"Poison Ivy" (The Coasters cover)	Jerry Leiber and Mike Stoller	3:00
3.	"Lonely Boy"		4:02
4.	"Don't Accuse"		2:48
5.	"Rain (Falling Down)"		2:40
6.	"More Than Anything"		6:07
7.	"The Love You Save" (The Jackson 5 cover)	The Corporation	2:32
8.	"Back to the Island" (Baha Men cover)	Ronnie Butler; Eddie Rolle	4:07
9.	"More Than Anything" (Reprise)		4:38
