= Us Against the World =

Us Against the World may refer to:

- Us Against the World (album) or the title song, by Play, 2001
- "Us Against the World" (Christina Milian song), 2008
- "Us Against the World", an unreleased song recorded by Lana Del Rey
- "Us Against the World" (Westlife song), 2008
- "Us Against the World", a song by Coldplay from Mylo Xyloto, 2011
- "Us Against the World", a song by Darren Styles from Monstercat Uncaged Vol. 1, 2017
- "Us Against the World", a song by Killswitch Engage from Atonement, 2019
- "Us Against the World", a song by Mitchel Musso from Mitchel Musso, 2009

== See also ==
- Me Against the World (disambiguation)
- Against the World (disambiguation)
