= Me Against the World (disambiguation) =

Me Against the World is a 1995 album by 2Pac.

Me Against the World may also refer to:

- Me Against the World (compilation album), by Deep Elm Records, 2002
- "Me Against The World", a song by 2Pac from Me Against the World
- "Me Against the World", a song by Simple Plan from Still Not Getting Any...
- "Me Against the World", a song by Lizzy Borden from Visual Lies

== See also ==
- Us Against the World (disambiguation)
- Against the World (disambiguation)
- Contemptus mundi
