= Snowed In =

Studio album by Hanson
- Released: November 18, 1997
- Recorded: October 1997
- Studio: (London)
- Genres: Christmas; pop rock
- Length: 41:10
- Label: Mercury / PolyGram
- Producers: Mark Hudson, Hanson

Hanson chronology
Middle of Nowhere (1997)	Snowed In (1997)	3 Car Garage (1998)

Professional ratings
Review scores
Source	Rating
AllMusic	3/5 stars
Entertainment Weekly	A−
Music Week	5/5 stars
NME	3/10 stars
The Rolling Stone Album Guide	3/5 stars

Professional ratings
Review scores
Source	Rating

Snowed In is the first Christmas album by American pop rock group Hanson. It was quickly released following the success of their previous album, Middle of Nowhere, and was recorded in London. Snowed In was also the best-selling holiday album for 1997 in the United States, selling 863,000 copies that year according to Nielsen SoundScan. It has since sold a total of 1,081,000 copies in the US.

The album features a mix of traditional Christmas carols (such as "Silent Night Medley"), covers of Christmas themed songs (such as "Rockin' Around the Christmas Tree" and "Merry Christmas, Baby") and Hanson's own compositions (such as "At Christmas" and "Christmas Time").

== Commercial performance ==
Total sales were around 2 million, though 1.2 million of these were sold in the United States. The album both debuted and peaked at position number 7 on the U.S. Billboard 200 album sales chart in December 1997, and was certified Platinum by the Recording Industry Association of America on December 15, 1997, for shipment of one million copies in the U.S.

The album also had a quick run on the Swedish albums chart and peaked at number 14.

== Track listing ==
1. "Merry Christmas Baby" (Lou Baxter, Johnny Moore) – 3:12
2. "What Christmas Means to Me" (Anna Gordy Gaye, George Gordy, Allen Story) – 3:43
3. "Little Saint Nick" (Mike Love, Brian Wilson) – 3:33
4. "At Christmas" (Isaac Hanson, Taylor Hanson, Zachary Hanson) – 5:17
5. "Christmas (Baby Please Come Home)" (Jeff Barry, Ellie Greenwich, Phil Spector) – 3:20
6. "Rockin' Around the Christmas Tree" (Johnny Marks) – 2:38
7. "Christmas Time" (Isaac Hanson, Taylor Hanson, Zachary Hanson, Mark Hudson) – 3:59
8. "Everybody Knows the Claus" (Isaac Hanson, Taylor Hanson, Zachary Hanson) – 4:47
9. "Run Rudolph Run" (Marvin Brodie, Johnny Marks) – 3:11
10. "Silent Night Medley: O Holy Night/Silent Night/O Come All Ye Faithful" – 5:26
11. "White Christmas" (Irving Berlin) – 1:49

== Personnel ==
- Danny Clinch – photography
- Matthew Cordle – piano
- Laurence Cottle – bass
- Margery Greenspan – art direction
- Hanson – arranger, producer, executive producer
- Isaac Hanson – guitar, vocals
- Taylor Hanson – piano, organ, keyboards, Wurlitzer, vocals
- Zac Hanson – drums, percussion, vocals
- Mark Hudson – arranger, guitar (rhythm), producer
- Ted Jensen – mastering
- Ian Kirkham – saxophone
- Nadia Lanman – cello
- Tom Lord-Alge – mixing
- Richard Patrick – design
- Iain Roberton – engineer
- Chris Taylor – bass
- Andy Wright – keyboards, programming
- Paul Wright – engineer

== Charts ==
=== Weekly charts ===
Chart (1997)	Peak position
Australian Albums (ARIA)	3
Austrian Albums (Ö3 Austria)	31
Belgian Albums (Ultratop Flanders)	20
Belgian Albums (Ultratop Wallonia)	47
Canadian Albums (Billboard)	14
Dutch Albums (Album Top 100)	32
European Albums Chart	38
Finnish Albums (Suomen virallinen lista)	7
German Albums (Offizielle Top 100)	65
Japanese Albums (Oricon)	24
New Zealand Albums (RMNZ)	12
Swedish Albums (Sverigetopplistan)	14
Swiss Albums (Schweizer Hitparade)	20
UK Albums (Official Charts)	87
US Billboard 200	7
US Top Holiday Albums (Billboard)	1

=== Year-end charts ===
Chart (1997)	Position
Australian Albums (ARIA)	25
Belgian Albums (Ultratop Flanders)	88

== Certifications ==
Region	Certification	Certified units/sales
Australia (ARIA)	2× Platinum	140,000^{^}
Canada (Music Canada)	Platinum	100,000^{^}
United States (RIAA)	Platinum	1,000,000^{^}
^{^} Shipments figures based on certification alone.
