= The Walk (album) =

Studio album by Hanson
- Released: February 21, 2007
- Recorded: Late 2004 – late 2006
- Genre: Pop rock
- Length: 51:19
- Labels: 3CG; Cooking Vinyl
- Producers: Danny Kortchmar; Hanson

Hanson chronology
20th Century Masters – The Millennium Collection: The Best of Hanson (2006)	The Walk (2007)	Middle of Nowhere Acoustic (2007)

Professional ratings
Review scores
Source	Rating
AbsolutePunk	86%
AllMusic	3.5/5 stars
Entertainment Weekly	B+

The Walk is the fourth album by American pop rock group Hanson. It was released in Japan on February 21, 2007, in the UK on April 30, in the US, Canada, and Mexico on July 24, and in Italy on March 21, 2008.

== Track listing ==
All songs written by Isaac Hanson, Taylor Hanson and Zac Hanson except where noted.

1. "Ngi Ne Themba (I Have Hope)" – 0:24
2. "Great Divide" – 4:00 (Lead vocals: Taylor Hanson)
3. "Been There Before" – 3:33 (Lead vocals: Taylor Hanson)
4. "Georgia" – 3:48 (Lead vocals: Taylor Hanson)
5. "Watch Over Me" (Isaac Hanson, Zac Maloy, Chris Holmes) – 4:54 (Lead vocals: Isaac Hanson)
6. "Running Man" (Zac Hanson, William James McAuley III) – 3:41 (Lead vocals: Zac Hanson)
7. "Go" (Zac Hanson, William James McAuley III, Shannon Curfman) – 4:04 (Lead vocals: Zac Hanson)
8. "Fire on the Mountain" – 2:42 (Lead vocals: Zac Hanson)
9. "One More" – 4:11 (Lead vocals: Taylor Hanson)
10. "Blue Sky" – 3:37 (Lead vocals: Taylor Hanson)
11. "Tearing It Down" - 3:05 (Lead vocals: Zac Hanson)
12. "Something Going Round" – 3:13 (Lead vocals: Taylor and Isaac Hanson)
13. "Your Illusion" – 5:01 (Lead vocals: Taylor Hanson)
14. "The Walk" – 5:03 (Lead vocals: Zac Hanson)

North American and Italian bonus tracks

15. "Got a Hold on Me" (live acoustic) (Lead vocals: Taylor Hanson)
16. "I've Been Down" (live acoustic) (Lead vocals: Taylor Hanson)
17. "Something Going Round" (live acoustic) (Lead vocals: Taylor and Isaac Hanson)

Japanese bonus tracks

15. "In a Way" – 4:04 (Lead vocals: Zac Hanson)
16. "I Am" – 3:44 (Lead vocals: Zac Hanson)

== Singles ==
1. "Great Divide": released November 28, 2006
2. "Go": released April 19, 2007

== Personnel ==
- Craig Alvin – engineer, mixing
- Bleu – bass guitar, guitar, production
- DD Dliwayo School Choir – choir
- CJ Eiriksson – engineer, mixing
- Isaac Hanson – vocals, guitar, mixing, production
- Taylor Hanson – vocals, piano, keyboards, organ, percussion, mixing, production
- Zac Hanson – vocals, drums, percussion, piano, mixing, production
- Hanson family – handclapping
- Iris Ministries Zimpeto Center Choir – choir
- Palesa Khokeletso – choir director
- Danny Kortchmar – conga, production
- Chris Rezanson – bell, triangle
- Kenneth Wyatt – bass, harmonica
- Adam Zappa – engineer
- Miles Zuniga – guitar

== Charts ==
Chart performance for The Walk
Chart (2007)	Peak position
Japanese Albums (Oricon)	190
Scottish Albums (Official Charts)	78
UK Albums (Official Charts)	83
UK Independent Albums (Official Charts)	6
US Billboard 200	56
US Independent Albums (Billboard)	4
