= Thinking of You (Hanson song) =

1998 single by Hanson

Single by Hanson

from the album Middle of Nowhere
- Released: May 4, 1998
- Length: 3:09 (3 Car Garage version); 3:13 (Middle of Nowhere version)
- Label: Mercury
- Songwriters: Isaac Hanson; Taylor Hanson; Zac Hanson
- Producers: Isaac Hanson, Taylor Hanson, Zac Hanson (3 Car Garage version); Dust Brothers (Middle of Nowhere version)

Hanson singles chronology
"Weird" (1998)	"Thinking of You" (1998)	"If Only" (2000)

Music video
- "Thinking of You" on YouTube

"Thinking of You" is a song written and performed by American pop rock band Hanson. It was released as the fifth and final single from the band's debut album, Middle of Nowhere (1997), on May 4, 1998. The single was a success in Australia and Finland, reaching number six in both countries, and in New Zealand and the United Kingdom, where it peaked within the top 30. "Thinking of You" was not released in the United States, but in Canada, it peaked at number 10 on the Canadian Singles Chart.

== Track listings ==
All songs were written by Isaac Hanson, Taylor Hanson, and Zac Hanson except "Weird", written by Desmond Child and Hanson.

Canadian CD single and UK cassette single

1. "Thinking of You" (Middle of Nowhere version) – 3:13
2. "Thinking of You" (3 Car Garage version) – 3:10

UK, European, and Australian CD single

1. "Thinking of You" (Middle of Nowhere version) – 3:13
2. "Thinking of You" (3 Car Garage version) – 3:09
3. "River" – 3:46
4. "Stories" – 2:34

UK limited-edition CD single

1. "Thinking of You" (Middle of Nowhere version) – 3:13
2. "MMMBop" (3 Car Garage version) – 5:09
3. "Thinking of You" (Dust Brothers version) – 3:13
4. "With You in Your Dreams" (3 Car Garage version) – 4:12

Australian mini-CD single

1. "Thinking of You" (Middle of Nowhere version)
2. "Weird" (South Beach Mix)
3. "Weird" (Movo Mix)
4. "Weird" (Guitar Mix)
5. "Thinking of You" (Dust Brothers Mix)

== Personnel ==
Personnel are taken from the UK limited-edition CD single liner notes.

- Isaac Hanson, Taylor Hanson, Zac Hanson – writing
- Dust Brothers – production
- Stephen Lironi – additional production
- Tom Lord-Alge – mixing

== Charts ==
=== Weekly charts ===
Chart (1998)	Peak position
Australia (ARIA)	6
Canada (Nielsen SoundScan)	10
Estonia (Eesti Top 20)	13
Finland (Suomen virallinen lista)	6
New Zealand (Recorded Music NZ)	27
Scotland Singles (OCC)	26
UK Singles (OCC)	23
UK Airplay (Music Week)	38

=== Year-end charts ===
Chart (1998)	Position
Australia (ARIA)	96

== Certifications ==
Region	Certification	Certified units/sales
Australia (ARIA)	Gold	35,000^{^}
United Kingdom (BPI)	Platinum	600,000^{‡}
^{^} Shipments figures based on certification alone.^{‡} Sales+streaming figures based on certification alone.

== Release history ==
Region	Date	Format(s)	Label(s)	Ref.
Australia	May 4, 1998	CD	Mercury	
United Kingdom	June 22, 1998	CD	Mercury	
