= Go (Hanson song) =

Single by Hanson

from the album The Walk
- Released: April 19, 2007
- Recorded: 2006
- Genre: Pop rock
- Label: 3CG Records, Cooking Vinyl
- Songwriters: Zac Hanson, William James McAuley III, Shannon Curfman
- Producers: Hanson, William James McAuley III

Hanson singles chronology
| "Great Divide" (2006) | "Go" (2007) | "Thinking 'bout Somethin'" (2010) |

"Go" is a song written and performed by the pop-rock band Hanson. It is the second single from their fourth album, The Walk (2007), and the first single to be sung by youngest brother Zac Hanson.

== Track listings ==
Written by Zac Hanson, William James McAuley III and Shannon Curfman.

Go, Part 1:

1. "Go" (Radio Edit)
2. "Ugly Truth"

Go, Part 2:

1. "Go" (Album Edit)
2. "I've Been Down"
3. "Rip It Up" (Live)
4. "Walk" (Live)

Go, DVD:

1. "Go" (Music Video)
2. "Underneath" (Music Video)
3. "Taking the Walk" (Trailer)

== Chart performance ==
| Chart | Peak position |
|---|---|
| Scottish Singles Chart | 7 |
| UK Singles Chart | 44 |
| UK Independent Singles Chart | 3 |

== Cover version ==
The song has been recorded by co-writer Bleu for his 2009 album A Watched Pot.
