= I Will Come to You =

1997 single by Hanson

Single by Hanson

from the album Middle of Nowhere
- B-side: "With You in Your Dreams"; "Cried"
- Released: September 23, 1997
- Length: 4:11
- Label: Mercury
- Songwriters: Isaac Hanson; Taylor Hanson; Zac Hanson; Barry Mann; Cynthia Weil
- Producer: Stephen Lironi

Hanson singles chronology
"Where's the Love" (1997)	"I Will Come to You" (1997)	"Weird" (1998)

Music video
- "I Will Come to You" on YouTube

"I Will Come to You" is a song by American pop rock band Hanson. It was released on September 23, 1997, by Mercury Records, as the third single from the band's debut album, Middle of Nowhere (1997). "I Will Come to You" reached number five on the UK Singles Chart and number nine on the US Billboard Hot 100. It was more successful in Australia, reaching number two and receiving a platinum certification, and in Sweden, where it topped the chart for four weeks and was also certified platinum.

== Critical reception ==
British magazine Music Week gave "I Will Come to You" a full score of five out of five and named it Single of the Week, writing, "With its extremely catchy singalong chorus and big, dramatic build, this has huge Christmas hit written ail over it and could well upsel the bookies' predictions by going all the way to the top."

== Music video ==
The accompanying music video for "I Will Come to You" was filmed in London and directed by Peter "Sleazy" Christopherson of the experimental group Coil. In the video Isaac, Taylor and Zac are performing in a forest. They look like angels in the city streets. Christopherson claimed that the Hanson brothers' original vision for the video was darker than the final product.

There was also another video filmed at the Beacon Theatre in New York City; this version was directed by Jeb Brien.

== Track listings ==
- US 7-inch single

A. "I Will Come to You" – 4:11
B. "With You in Your Dreams" – 3:53

- US CD and cassette single
1. "I Will Come to You" – 4:11
2. "Cried" – 3:34
- US maxi-CD single
1. "I Will Come to You" (Tee's Frozen Club) – 7:47
2. "I Will Come to You" (Tee's Radio) – 4:20
3. "I Will Come to You" (Tee's Frozen Dub) – 7:29
4. "I Will Come to You" (acapella) – 4:12
5. "I Will Come to You" (album version) – 4:11
6. "MMMBop" (live acoustic version) – 3:28
- UK and Australian CD1
1. "I Will Come to You" – 4:11
2. "Cried" – 3:34
3. "MMMBop" (live) – 3:36
4. "Madeline" (live) – 3:32
- UK and Australian CD2
1. "I Will Come to You" – 4:11
2. "MMMBop" (live) – 3:36
3. "Merry Christmas Baby" – 3:08
4. "What Christmas Means to Me" – 3:42
- UK cassette single and European CD single
1. "I Will Come to You" – 4:11
2. "MMMBop" (live) – 3:36

== Charts ==
=== Weekly charts ===
Chart (1997–1998)	Peak position
Australia (ARIA)	2
Austria (Ö3 Austria Top 40)	10
Belgium (Ultratop 50 Flanders)	4
Belgium (Ultratop 50 Wallonia)	7
Canada (Nielsen Soundscan)	3
Canada Top Singles (RPM)	11
Canada Adult Contemporary (RPM)	28
Estonia (Eesti Top 20)	17
Europe (Eurochart Hot 100)	4
Europe (European Hit Radio)	5
Finland (Suomen virallinen lista)	2
Finland Airplay (Radiosoittolista)	4
France (SNEP)	10
France Airplay (SNEP)	19
Germany (GfK)	36
Iceland (Íslenski Listinn Topp 40)	16
Ireland (IRMA)	14
Latvia (Latvijas Top 20)	10
Netherlands (Dutch Top 40)	9
Netherlands (Single Top 100)	12
New Zealand (Recorded Music NZ)	3
Norway (VG-lista)	4
Scottish Singles Sales (Official Charts)	4
Spain Airplay (Top 40 Radio)	36
Sweden (Sverigetopplistan)	1
Switzerland (Schweizer Hitparade)	9
UK Singles (Official Charts)	5
UK Airplay (Music Week)	13
US Billboard Hot 100	9
US Dance Singles Sales (Billboard)	22
US Pop Airplay (Billboard)	18
US Rhythmic Airplay (Billboard)	36

=== Year-end charts ===
Chart (1997)	Position
Australia (ARIA)	15
Belgium (Ultratop 50 Flanders)	38
Belgium (Ultratop 50 Wallonia)	66
Brazil (Crowley)	36
Canada Top Singles (RPM)	98
Netherlands (Dutch Top 40)	97
Netherlands (Single Top 100)	88
Sweden (Topplistan)	7
UK Singles (OCC)	112

Chart (1998)	Position
Belgium (Ultratop 50 Wallonia)	74
Brazil (Crowley)	41
Europe (Eurochart Hot 100)	61
France (SNEP)	90
Sweden (Hitlistan)	49
US Billboard Hot 100	50

== Certifications ==
Region	Certification	Certified units/sales
Australia (ARIA)	Platinum	70,000^{^}
Belgium (BRMA)	Gold	25,000^{*}
France (SNEP)	Gold	250,000^{*}
Sweden (GLF)	Platinum	30,000^{^}
United States (RIAA)	Gold	600,000
^{*} Sales figures based on certification alone.^{^} Shipments figures based on certification alone.

== Release history ==
Region	Date	Format(s)	Label(s)	Ref.
United States	September 23, 1997	Contemporary hit radio	Mercury	
United Kingdom	November 10, 1997	CD; cassette	Mercury	
United States	November 11, 1997	7-inch vinyl; cassette	Mercury	
Japan	November 24, 1997	CD	Mercury	
