= Weird (Hanson song) =

1998 single by Hanson

Single by Hanson

from the album Middle of Nowhere
- Released: March 16, 1998 (UK)
- Genre: Rock
- Length: 4:02
- Label: Mercury
- Songwriters: Isaac Hanson; Taylor Hanson; Zac Hanson; Desmond Child
- Producer: Stephen Lironi

Hanson singles chronology
"I Will Come to You" (1997)	"Weird" (1998)	"Thinking of You" (1998)

Music video
- "Weird" on YouTube

"Weird" is a song written and performed by American pop rock band Hanson. The rock ballad was the fourth single released from the band's major label debut album, Middle of Nowhere (1997), and became a moderate hit worldwide, charting within the top 20 in Australia, Canada, Finland, New Zealand, and the United Kingdom.

== Critical reception ==
British magazine Music Week wrote, "This slow-tempo ballad might have been a better choice for their Christmas song than 'I Will Come to You', which made number five but did not last through the season. It's a dreamy affair, scooping in references to John Lennon, George Michael and Chris de Burgh. Luscious."

== Chart performance ==
"Weird" performed well in the United Kingdom, peaking at number 19 on the UK Singles Chart and becoming their fourth top-20 hit there. It also did well on the Australian ARIA Singles Chart, charting at number 12, the Canadian RPM 100 Hit Tracks chart, reaching number 11, and the New Zealand RIANZ Singles Chart, peaking at number 10. It charted the highest in Finland, where it rose to number four during its third week on the Finnish Singles Chart.

== Music video ==
The music video for "Weird" was directed by Gus Van Sant. It features the band performing the song in a crowded subway and walking in Times Square, New York City.

== Track listings ==
All songs were written by Isaac Hanson, Taylor Hanson, and Zac Hanson. Additional writers are in parentheses.

- Canadian CD single and UK cassette single
1. "Weird" (LP version) (Desmond Child) – 3:59 (4:02 on cassette)
2. "I Will Come to You" (Tee's Radio) (Barry Mann, Cynthia Weil) – 4:20
- UK and European CD single
1. "Weird" (album version) (Child) – 4:02
2. "I Will Come to You" (Tee's Radio) (Mann, Weil) – 4:20
3. "Speechless" (Clif Magness) – 4:20
4. "I Will Come to You" (Tee's Frozen club mix) (Mann, Weil) – 7:47
- Australian CD single
1. "Weird" (Child)
2. "Weird" (Desmond Child mix) (Child)
3. "Weird" (Tom Lord-Alge mix) (Child)
4. "Yearbook" (Ellen Shipley)

== Charts ==
=== Weekly charts ===
Chart (1998)	Peak position
Australia (ARIA)	12
Belgium (Ultratip Bubbling Under Flanders)	4
Belgium (Ultratop 50 Wallonia)	39
Canada (Nielsen Soundscan)	3
Canada Top Singles (RPM)	11
Canada Adult Contemporary (RPM)	43
Estonia (Eesti Top 20)	19
Europe (Eurochart Hot 100)	57
Europe (European Hit Radio)	23
Finland (Suomen virallinen lista)	4
France (SNEP)	80
Iceland (Íslenski Listinn Topp 40)	27
Ireland (IRMA)	22
Netherlands (Dutch Top 40 Tipparade)	3
Netherlands (Single Top 100)	72
New Zealand (Recorded Music NZ)	10
Scottish Singles Sales (Official Charts)	18
Sweden (Sverigetopplistan)	21
UK Singles (Official Charts)	19
UK Airplay (Music Week)	38
US Pop Airplay (Billboard)	31

=== Year-end charts ===
Chart (1998)	Position
Australia (ARIA)	84

== Certifications ==
Region	Certification	Certified units/sales
Australia (ARIA)	Gold	35,000^{^}
^{^} Shipments figures based on certification alone.

== Release history ==
Region	Date	Format(s)	Label(s)	Ref.
Australia	1998	CD	Mercury	
United Kingdom	March 16, 1998	CD; cassette	Mercury	
Japan	April 29, 1998	CD	Mercury	
