= Middle of Nowhere (Hanson album) =

1997 studio album by Hanson

Studio album by Hanson
- Released: May 6, 1997
- Recorded: July – November 1996
- Studios: Los Angeles, California
- Genres: Pop rock; teen pop
- Length: 53:41
- Labels: Mercury; PolyGram
- Producers: The Dust Brothers; Stephen Lironi

Hanson chronology
MMMBop (1996)	Middle of Nowhere (1997)	Snowed In (1997)

Singles from Middle of Nowhere
- 1. "MMMBop" Released: March 24, 1997; 2. "Where's the Love" Released: July 8, 1997; 3. "I Will Come to You" Released: September 23, 1997; 4. "Weird" Released: March 16, 1998; 5. "Thinking of You" Released: May 4, 1998

Middle of Nowhere is the debut studio album by American pop rock group Hanson, and the first to be released on a major label, which was PolyGram Records and Mercury Records. Released in 1997, it features slicker studio production compared to their previous indie efforts Boomerang and MMMBop. The band members were between the ages of 11 and 16 when it was released. "Yearbook", one of the album's more dramatic songs, was not performed live until the recording of Middle of Nowhere Acoustic on May 5, 2007.

Middle of Nowhere yielded five singles: "MMMBop", "Where's the Love", "I Will Come to You", "Weird", and "Thinking of You". "MMMBop" became a major hit, reaching number one in the United States and at least eleven other countries. The album earned Hanson three Grammy Award nominations, including Best New Artist and Record of the Year.

== Reception ==
Professional ratings
Review scores
Source	Rating
AllMusic	4/5 stars
Christgau's Consumer Guide	(2-star Honorable Mention)
The Encyclopedia of Popular Music	3/5 stars
Entertainment Weekly	A−
Los Angeles Times	3/4 stars
Music Week	5/5 stars
NME	8/10
Rolling Stone	3/5 stars
The Rolling Stone Album Guide	4/5 stars
Smash Hits	5/5 stars
Spin	8/10

Middle of Nowhere reached number two on the Billboard 200, being kept out of the top spot by the Spice Girls' Spice. The album also reached number one in the UK, Australia, Germany, and Taiwan.

Total sales worldwide are 10 million copies. The album sold just under 4 million in the US (4 times platinum) and over 400,000 copies in UK.

The album was well received by critics. David Browne of Entertainment Weekly said of the trio: "... lack of guile is Hanson's most endearing quality."

== Track listing ==
All tracks are written by Hanson (Isaac, Taylor and Zac), except where noted.
Lead vocals by Taylor Hanson, except where noted.

No.	Title	Writer(s)	Lead Vocals	Length
1.	"Thinking of You"			3:13
2.	"MMMBop"			4:28
3.	"Weird"	Hanson; Desmond Child		4:02
4.	"Speechless"	Hanson; Stephen Lironi		4:20
5.	"Where's the Love"	Hanson; Mark Hudson; Sander Selover		4:13
6.	"Yearbook"	Hanson; Ellen Shipley		5:29
7.	"Look at You"	Hanson; Stephen Lironi		4:28
8.	"Lucy"	Hanson; Mark Hudson	Zac	3:35
9.	"I Will Come to You"	Hanson; Barry Mann; Cynthia Weil		4:11
10.	"A Minute Without You"	Hanson; Mark Hudson	Taylor; Isaac	3:55
11.	"Madeline"	Hanson; Clif Magness	Taylor; Isaac	4:13
12.	"With You in Your Dreams"			3:56
13.	"Man from Milwaukee" (hidden track)		Zac	3:38

Notes

- "Man from Milwaukee" is actually track #21, as there are eight tracks of silence after "With You in Your Dreams". In Japan the song is track 14 because a remix of "MMMBop" serves as song 13. "Man from Milwaukee" was omitted from all cassettes and vinyl pressings of Middle of Nowhere. Some later reissues of the album in some locales including the remastered version and the digital download pressings omitted the tracks of silence and make "Man from Milwaukee" a true track 13.

== Personnel ==
=== Hanson ===
- Isaac Hanson – guitar, background vocals; co-lead vocals (10, 11)
- Taylor Hanson – keyboards, piano, lead vocals
- Zac Hanson – drums, background vocals; lead vocals (8, 13)

=== Additional musicians ===
- Stephen Lironi – bass, guitar, keyboards, percussion, production, programming
- Peter Kent – violin
- Michael Fischer – percussion
- Carole Mukogawa – viola
- John Wittenberg – violin
- Mike Shawcross – percussion
- Michito Sanchez – percussion
- Larry Corbett – cello
- Steve Richards – cello
- Ged Lynch – drums, percussion
- Nick Vincent – drums
- Endre Granat – violin
- Abe Laboriel Jr. – drums
- David Campbell – conductor, string arrangements
- Abraham Laboriel – bass
- Neil Stubenhaus – bass
- B.J. Cole – pedal steel
- Sandy Stein – keyboards
- Mark Hudson – harmonica
- Murray Adler – violin

=== Technical ===
- The Dust Brothers – production, programming
- Steve Greenberg – executive producer
- Ted Jensen – mastering
- Mark Hudson – vocal director
- Roger Love – vocal director
- Margery Greenspan – art direction
- Barry Mann – vocal director
- Marina Chavez – photography

== Charts ==
=== Weekly charts ===
Chart (1997)	Peak position
Australian Albums (ARIA)	1
Austrian Albums (Ö3 Austria)	2
Belgian Albums (Ultratop Flanders)	2
Belgian Albums (Ultratop Wallonia)	15
Canadian Albums (RPM)	4
Czech Albums (IFPI CR)	6
Danish Albums (Tracklisten)	5
Dutch Albums (Album Top 100)	5
Estonian Albums (Eesti Top 10)	8
European Albums Chart	3
Finnish Albums (Suomen virallinen lista)	4
French Albums (SNEP)	15
German Albums (Offizielle Top 100)	1
Greek Albums (IFPI Greece)	7
Hungarian Albums (MAHASZ)	29
Irish Albums (IRMA)	6
Italian Albums (FIMI)	23
Italian Albums (Musica e dischi)	25
Japanese Albums (Oricon)	10
Malaysian Albums (IFPI)	4
New Zealand Albums (RMNZ)	4
Norwegian Albums (VG-lista)	7
Portuguese Albums (AFP)	8
Scottish Albums (OCC)	6
Singapore Albums (SPVA)	1
Spanish Albums (PROMUSICAE)	10
Swedish Albums (Sverigetopplistan)	4
Swiss Albums (Schweizer Hitparade)	2
Taiwanese Albums (IFPI)	1
UK Albums (Official Charts)	1
US Billboard 200	2
Zimbabwean Albums (ZIMA)	4

=== Year-end charts ===
Chart (1997)	Position
Australian Albums (ARIA)	3
Austrian Albums (Ö3 Austria)	22
Belgian Albums (Ultratop Flanders)	13
Belgian Albums (Ultratop Wallonia)	43
Canadian Albums (Nielsen Soundscan)	18
Dutch Albums (Album Top 100)	78
European Top 100 Albums (Music & Media)	28
French Albums (SNEP)	36
German Albums (Offizielle Top 100)	37
New Zealand Albums (RMNZ)	16
Swedish Albums (Sverigetopplistan)	16
Swiss Albums (Schweizer Hitparade)	14
UK Albums (OCC)	61
US Billboard 200	13

Chart (1998)	Position
Belgian Albums (Ultratop Flanders)	81
Canadian Albums (RPM)	96
US Billboard 200	41

=== Decade-end charts ===
Chart (1990–1999)	Position
US Billboard 200	89

== Certifications ==
Region	Certification	Certified units/sales
Australia (ARIA)	5× Platinum	350,000^{^}
Austria (IFPI Austria)	Gold	25,000^{*}
Belgium (BRMA)	Platinum	50,000^{*}
Brazil (Pro-Música Brasil)	Platinum	250,000^{*}
Canada (Music Canada)	5× Platinum	500,000^{^}
Finland (Musiikkituottajat)	Gold	31,809
France (SNEP)	2× Gold	200,000^{*}
Germany (BVMI)	Gold	250,000^{^}
Hong Kong (IFPI Hong Kong)	Gold	10,000^{*}
Japan (RIAJ)	Platinum	200,000^{^}
Mexico (AMPROFON)	Gold	100,000^{^}
Netherlands (NVPI)	Gold	50,000^{^}
New Zealand (RMNZ)	3× Platinum	45,000^{^}
Poland (ZPAV)	Gold	50,000^{*}
Spain (Promusicae)	Gold	50,000^{^}
Sweden (GLF)	Platinum	100,000^{^}
Switzerland (IFPI Switzerland)	Platinum	50,000^{^}
United Kingdom (BPI)	Gold	100,000^{^}
United States (RIAA)	4× Platinum	4,000,000^{^}
Summaries
Europe (IFPI)	Platinum	1,000,000^{*}
^{*} Sales figures based on certification alone.^{^} Shipments figures based on certification alone.
