= Where's the Love =

1997 single by Hanson

Single by Hanson

from the album Middle of Nowhere
- Released: July 8, 1997
- Length: 4:14 (album version); 3:52 (radio edit)
- Label: Mercury
- Songwriters: Isaac Hanson; Taylor Hanson; Zac Hanson; Mark Hudson; Sander Salover
- Producer: Stephen Lironi

Hanson singles chronology
"MMMBop" (1997)	"Where's the Love" (1997)	"I Will Come to You" (1997)

Music video
- "Where's the Love" on YouTube

"Where's the Love" is a song by American pop rock band Hanson. It was released on July 8, 1997 by Mercury Records, as the second single from the band's debut album, Middle of Nowhere (1997). Internationally, it was a successful follow-up to "MMMBop", reaching the top 10 in Australia, Canada, Finland, Hungary, New Zealand, and the United Kingdom. In the United States, "Where's the Love" did not chart on the Billboard Hot 100 since it was not released physically (which was a rule at the time), but it peaked at number 27 on the Billboard Hot 100 Airplay chart and number six on the Billboard Top 40/Mainstream chart.

== Critical reception ==
British magazine Music Week gave the song a full score of five out of five and named it Single of the Week, writing, "The siblings prove "MMMBop" was no fluke with this strong follow up, which shows their musicianship to greater effect than their debut. A second number one is a possibility." David Fricke from Rolling Stone stated that "you don't have to be a Bop magazine subscriber to fall for the cheesy bounce" of "Where's the Love". Alan Jackson from The Times said, "The "MMMBop" brats are back with a similarly infectious and chartbound slice of kid-rock."

== Track listings ==
All songs were written by Isaac Hanson, Taylor Hanson, and Zac Hanson. Additional writers are noted in small text.

- UK CD1
1. "Where's the Love" (radio edit) (Mark Hudson, Sander Selover) – 3:47
2. "Madeline" (live at the Hard Rock) (Clif Magness) – 3:21
3. "Man from Milwaukee" (live at the Hard Rock) – 2:58
4. "Where's the Love" (album version) (Hudson, Selover) – 4:12
- UK CD2
1. "Where's the Love" (album version) (Hudson, Selover) – 4:12
2. "Look at You" (Stephen Lironi) – 4:28
3. "Where's the Love" (Tommy D Londinium dub) (Hudson, Selover) – 6:37
4. "Where's the Love" (Tommy D Ministry dub) (Hudson, Selover) – 8:39
- UK cassette single
1. "Where's the Love" (radio edit) (Hudson, Selover) – 3:47
2. "Where's the Love" (album version) (Hudson, Selover) – 4:12
3. "Look at You" (Lironi) – 4:28
- European CD single
1. "Where's the Love" (album version) (Hudson, Selover) – 4:12
2. "Look at You" (Lironi) – 4:28
- Australian CD single
1. "Where's the Love" (radio edit) (Hudson, Selover) – 3:47
2. "Where's the Love" (Berman Brothers mix) (Hudson, Selover) – 3:58
3. "Where's the Love" (Tommy D Londinium dub) (Hudson, Selover) – 6:37
4. "Where's the Love" (Tommy D Ministry dub) (Hudson, Selover) – 8:39
- Japanese CD single
1. "Where's the Love" (album version) (Hudson, Selover)
2. "Where's the Love" (Berman Brothers radio mix) (Hudson, Selover)
3. "Where's the Love" (Berman Brothers 12-inch mix) (Hudson, Selover)
4. "Where's the Love" (Berman Brothers instrumental—radio mix) (Hudson, Selover)

== Charts ==
=== Weekly charts ===
Chart (1997–1998)	Peak position
Australia (ARIA)	2
Austria (Ö3 Austria Top 40)	40
Belgium (Ultratop 50 Flanders)	14
Belgium (Ultratop 50 Wallonia)	22
Canada Top Singles (RPM)	2
Canada Adult Contemporary (RPM)	14
Estonia (Eesti Top 20)	2
Estonia Airplay (Eesti Top 25)	2
Europe (Eurochart Hot 100)	17
Europe (European Hit Radio)	2
Finland (Suomen virallinen lista)	8
Finland Airplay (Radiosoittolista)	1
France (SNEP)	37
France Airplay (SNEP)	4
Germany (GfK)	52
Hungary (Mahasz)	7
Iceland (Íslenski Listinn Topp 40)	21
Ireland (IRMA)	14
Israel (Israeli Singles Chart)	8
Italy Airplay (Music & Media)	3
Netherlands (Dutch Top 40)	15
Netherlands (Single Top 100)	31
New Zealand (Recorded Music NZ)	5
Scottish Singles Sales (Official Charts)	3
Spain Airplay (Top 40 Radio)	11
Sweden (Sverigetopplistan)	23
Switzerland (Schweizer Hitparade)	24
UK Singles (Official Charts)	4
UK Airplay (Music Week)	8
US Radio Songs (Billboard)	27
US Adult Pop Airplay (Billboard)	27
US Pop Airplay (Billboard)	6

=== Year-end charts ===
Chart (1997)	Position
Australia (ARIA)	13
Canada Top Singles (RPM)	15
Europe (European Hit Radio)	21
New Zealand (RIANZ)	39
Romania (Romanian Top 100)	69
UK Singles (OCC)	84

== Certifications ==
Region	Certification	Certified units/sales
Australia (ARIA)	Platinum	70,000^{^}
New Zealand (RMNZ)	Gold	5,000^{*}
United Kingdom (BPI)	Silver	200,000^{^}
^{*} Sales figures based on certification alone.^{^} Shipments figures based on certification alone.

== Release history ==
Region	Date	Format(s)	Label(s)	Ref.
United States	July 8, 1997	Contemporary hit radio	Mercury	
United Kingdom	September 1, 1997	CD; cassette	Mercury	
Japan	September 26, 1997	CD	Mercury	

== Bowling for Soup version ==
"Where's the Love"

Single by Bowling for Soup featuring Hanson

from the album Don't Mind If We Do
- Released: June 11, 2021
- Genre: Pop-punk
- Length: 3:54
- Label: Brando; Que-so
- Songwriters: Isaac Hanson; Taylor Hanson; Zac Hanson; Mark Hudson; Sander Salover
- Producers: Jarinus (Jaret Reddick and Linus of Hollywood)

Bowling for Soup singles chronology
"Getting Old Sucks (But Everybody's Doing It)" (2021)	"Where's the Love" (2021)	"Killin' 'Em With Kindness" (2021)

Music video
- "Where's the Love (feat. Hanson)" on YouTube

On June 11, 2021, American pop-punk band Bowling for Soup released a cover of the track, being joined by Hanson themselves. The cover was guitarist Chris Burney's idea. When asked about the track, singer Jaret Reddick said:

Taylor Hanson and I have been friends for a long while. So when Chris threw the idea of "Where’s The Love" into our "cover songs to record" mix, I thought, "Never hurts to ask!" Those guys stay BUSY! The idea was for Taylor to sing the bridge. You can imagine our surprised when he sent it back with himself, Isaac and Zac all singing on the song! And WAY above and beyond what we had asked.

Our voices sound so cool together, and hearing them sing over the huge guitars is freakin amazing! I have high hopes for this one!

The music video, animated by Dave Pearson, pays homage to the early Scooby-Doo cartoons.
