= Hanson (band) =

American pop-rock band

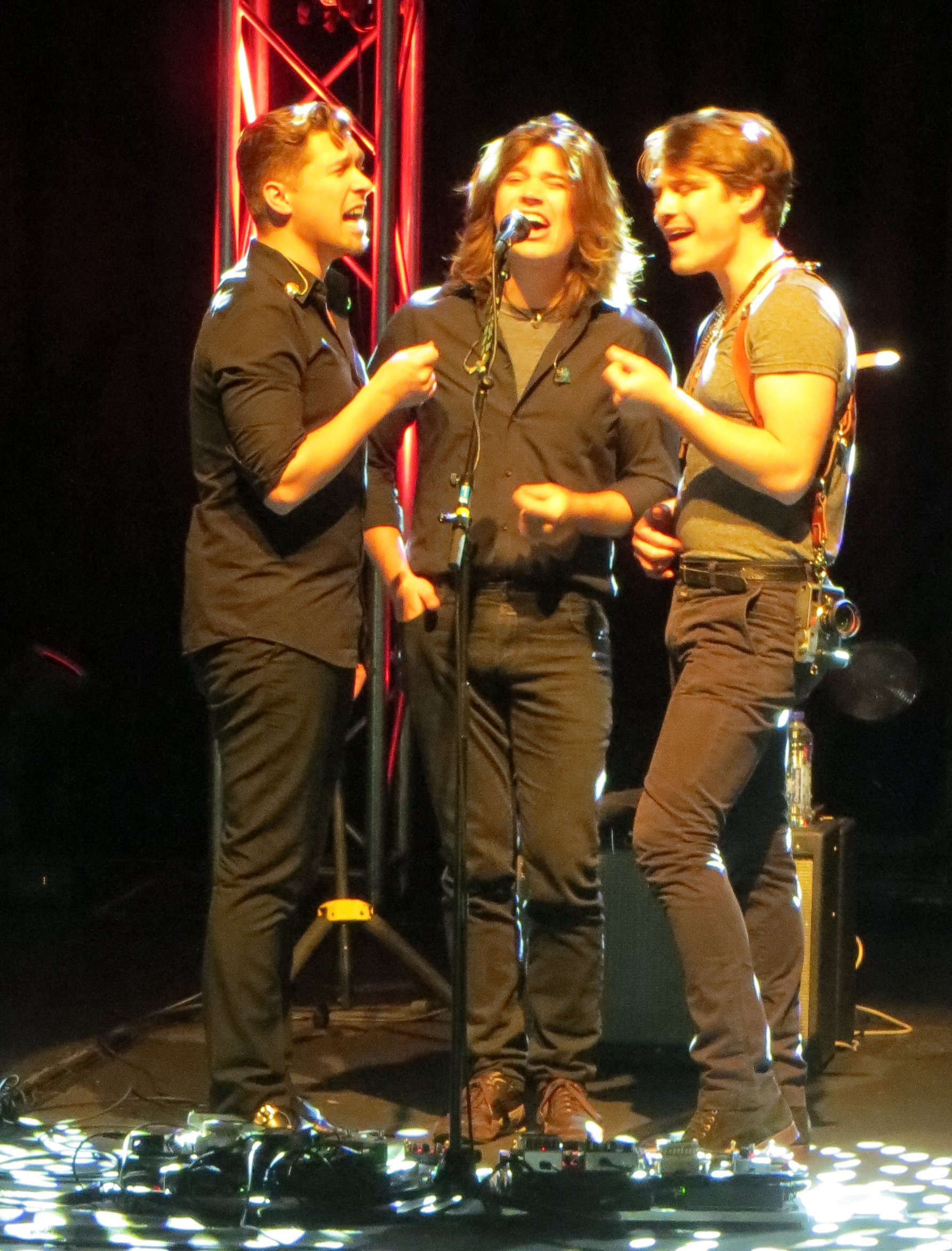
- Hanson performing in 2013

Background information
- Origin: Tulsa, Oklahoma, United States
- Genres: Pop rock; power pop
- Years active: 1992–present
- Labels: MCA; 604; Mercury; Island; Cooking Vinyl; 3CG
- Members: Isaac Hanson; Taylor Hanson; Zac Hanson
- Website: www.hanson.net

Hanson is an American pop rock band from Tulsa, Oklahoma, formed by brothers Isaac (guitar, vocals, bass, piano), Taylor (keyboards, vocals, percussion) and Zac Hanson (drums, vocals, piano). Supporting members includes Dimitrius Collins (guitar, additional keyboard) and Andrew Perusi (bass), who have toured with the band since 2007.

Hanson is widely-known for their 1997 hit single "MMMBop" from their debut album released through Mercury and PolyGram Records, en-titled Middle of Nowhere, which earned three Grammy nominations. At the time of the music video, the boys were 16, 14 and 11 years old. The group's label Mercury Records was merged with its sister labels and the band was moved to Island Def Jam Music Group. After releasing two albums with them, the band left the label.

Hanson has sold over 16 million records worldwide and have had three top-twenty albums in the United States. They have had three top-twenty US Billboard Hot 100 singles and eight UK top-forty singles. The band currently under their own record label 3CG Records.

== History ==
=== 1992–1996: Early years ===
In the early to mid-1990s, Isaac, Taylor, and Zac sang a cappella and recorded such classic songs as "Rockin' Robin", "Splish Splash", and "Johnny B. Goode", as well as their own material. Their first performance as a professional group took place in 1992 at the Mayfest Arts Festival in Tulsa. They were known as the Hanson Brothers, before shortening the name to Hanson in 1993.

Hanson also appeared on Carman's Yo! Kidz: The Vidz, which cast Taylor as a young Biblical David facing Goliath, Isaac as an event announcer, and Zac and other members of the family in the stands cheering on this "sporting event".

All three boys started their musical careers as pianists, but Isaac eventually started playing guitar and Zac started playing drums, while Taylor continued as the keyboard player. The band recorded two independent albums in their hometown of Tulsa, Boomerang (recorded in autumn 1994, released in 1995) and MMMBop (released in 1996). The latter featured the original version of the song "MMMBop", which later became the runaway single on their debut commercial record Middle of Nowhere. The band played in Austin during the South By Southwest music festival in Austin, Texas, which led to them being signed by manager Christopher Sabec. He shopped them to several record companies, most of which dismissed the band as a novelty before Steve Greenberg, an A&R representative for Mercury Records, heard them play a set at the Wisconsin State Fair. After this performance, they were signed almost immediately by Mercury. They soon became a worldwide sensation with the release of their first major-label album, Middle of Nowhere, which was produced by Stephen Lironi and the Dust Brothers.

=== 1997–2000: Commercial success ===
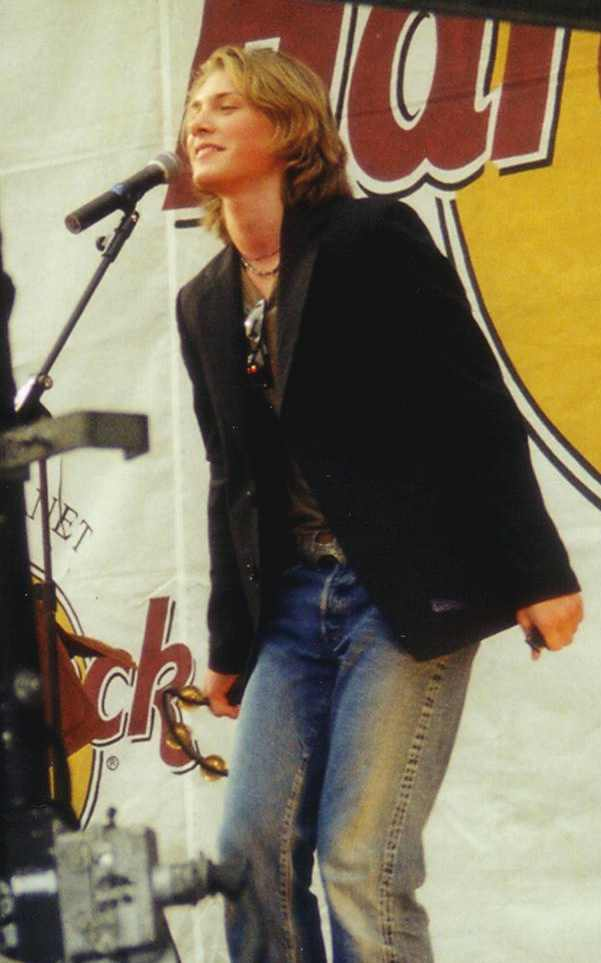
Taylor in concert in Madrid, Spain, 2000

Middle of Nowhere was released in the US on May 6, 1997, selling 10 million copies worldwide. May 6 was declared 'Hanson Day' in Tulsa by Oklahoma's then-governor Frank Keating. Although 'Hanson Day' was originally intended to be a one-time occurrence, the band celebrates it each year with a party for fans in Tulsa.

Hanson's popularity exploded during the summer of 1997, and Mercury Records released Hanson's first documentary Tulsa, Tokyo, and the Middle of Nowhere and their Christmas album Snowed In in the wake of their success. Hanson also launched MOE (which stood for Middle of Everywhere), a fan club magazine that ran for 12 issues. After numerous unauthorized biographies of each of the brothers were published, Hanson turned to their close friend, Jarrod Gollihare of Admiral Twin, to write their authorized biography. Hanson: The Official Book reached number 9 on The New York Times Best Sellers List (nonfiction) on February 1, 1998. The band was nominated for three Grammy Awards in 1998: Record of the Year, Best New Artist, and Best Pop Performance by a Duo or Group with Vocal.

During the summer of 1998, Hanson began a highly successful concert tour, the Albertane Tour. They performed a string of shows throughout stadiums and arenas across North America and Europe, targeting young audiences with a playful and energetic style. A live album, titled Live From Albertane, was released the following fall, as well as their second documentary The Road to Albertane.

In response to the demand for their earlier work, Hanson re-released MMMBop as 3 Car Garage, minus four tracks, in May 1998. Three tracks from Boomerang ("Boomerang", "More Than Anything", and "Rain (Falling Down)") and two of the remaining tracks from MMMBop ("Incredible" and "Baby (You're So Fine)") were released on the first MOE CD sent to fan club members.

During the Albertane Tour, Hanson wrote and demoed what became the songs for their second major studio album, This Time Around. During this time period, Mercury Records, the band's label, had been merged with Island Def Jam. In May 2000, Hanson released their second album, This Time Around, but due to lack of promotional funding, sales were low and the label eventually pulled funding for their tour. The band toured the Americas through the summer and fall of 2000 on their own funds.

=== 2001–2005: Independent career ===
After a three-year struggle, the brothers left Island Records to seek more creative freedom. Label executives had refused over 80 songs from the band, believing new material lacked marketability. The documentary film Strong Enough to Break follows these events.

Hanson now records for their own independent label, 3CG Records. The label has distribution deals through Alternative Distribution Alliance in the United States, Cooking Vinyl in Europe, Sony Music in Asia and with various other distributors throughout the world. During the dispute with their former label, Hanson signed with the management company 10th Street Entertainment, which also manages artists such as Blondie.

The band's Underneath Acoustic tour took place during the summer and fall of 2003 across the US, with one show in Canada and one in the UK. Music included acoustic versions of songs from the then-forthcoming release, Underneath. The tour ended November 5, 2003 with a performance at Carnegie Hall.

Released on April 20, 2004, Underneath sold 37,500 copies in the first week of release in the US alone. The album debuted at No. 1 on the Billboard Top Independent Albums chart and No. 25 on the Billboard 200 album chart, making Underneath one of the most successful self-released albums of all time. Hanson's The Underneath Tour took them across the globe for nearly a full year (July - December 2004; March - June 2005).

In autumn 2005, Hanson toured in the US and Canada to support The Best of Hanson: Live & Electric. They also visited colleges to showcase Strong Enough to Break, the documentary chronicling difficulties with and departure from Island Def Jam. During college visits, the band held question-and-answer sessions about independent artists' role in the music industry.

=== 2006–2008: The Walk and tenth anniversary ===
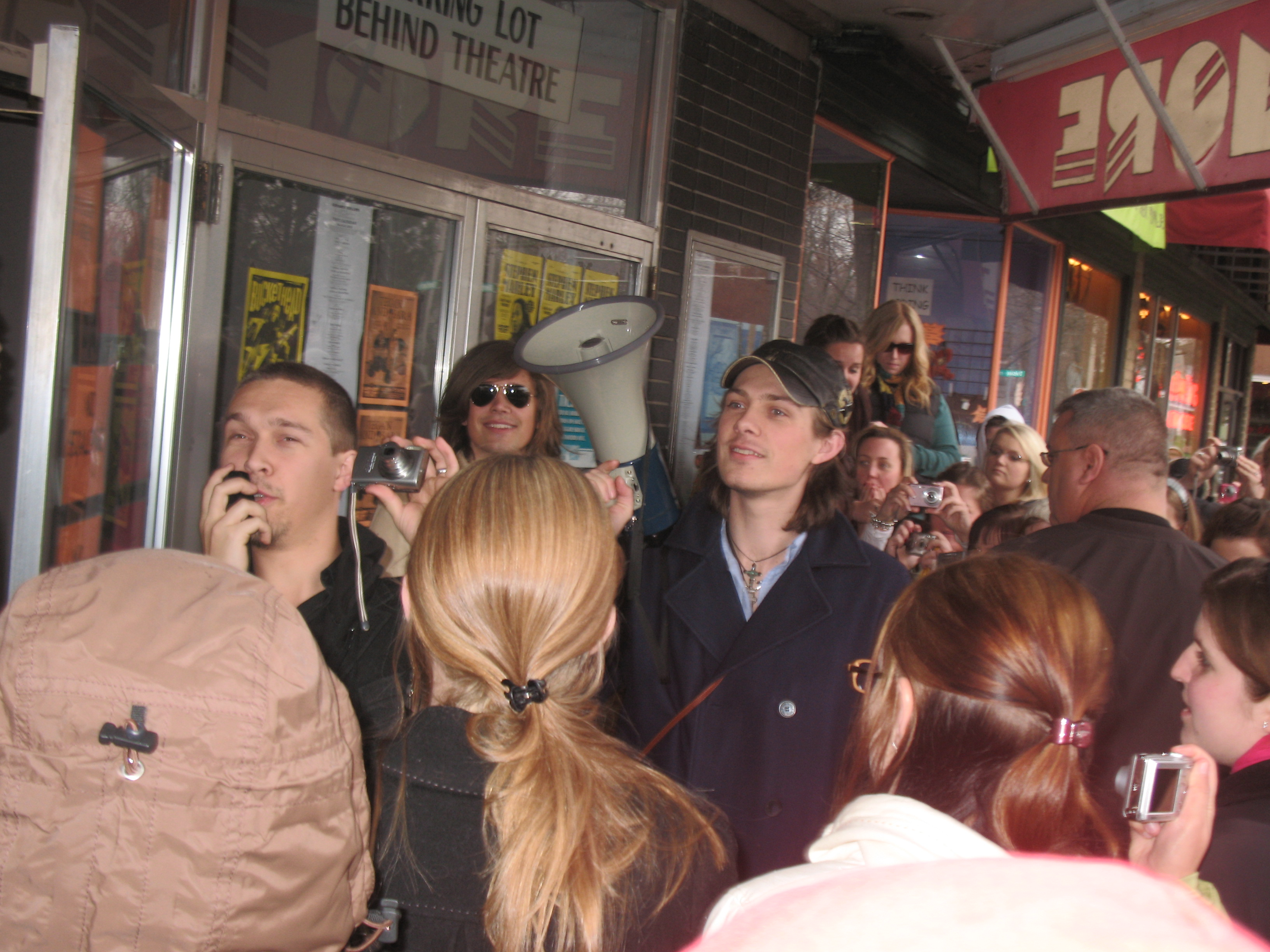
Hanson leading fans as part of their "Take the Walk" initiative in 2008.

On January 15, 2007, Hanson released on iTunes the first episode of their documentary podcast "Taking the Walk", detailing production of the studio album. The first episode of the band's documentary Strong Enough to Break was also released on iTunes. The program is edited into 13 episodes for release as a podcast.

In March 2007, Hanson began a "preview tour" to promote The Walk and give fans a taste of recent work. Over six days, Hanson performed at the Starland Ballroom in Sayreville, New Jersey, Toad's Place in New Haven, Connecticut, The Crocodile Rock in Allentown, Pennsylvania, and The Supper Club in New York City. On March 30, Taylor and Zac appeared in Dallas, Texas, to screen their documentary at the AFI Film Festival. Afterward, the brothers held a Q&A session along with director Ashley Greyson. Hanson performed in the UK during April 2007, playing songs from The Walk. They also promoted the release of the single "Go" and the UK release of the album.

The Walk, Hanson's second studio album with 3CG Records, was released in the US, Mexico and Canada on July 24. It was released in Japan on February 21 and in the UK on April 30. As part of this album's tour and promo, the band hosted "Take the Walk" events where fans were encouraged to walk one mile to raise money and awareness of AIDS/HIV in Africa. The band partnered with Toms Shoes to give shoes to children in Africa.

In support of The Walk album, the band toured extensively throughout 2007-2008, predominantly in the US, with some shows in Canada, the UK, and Ireland. The tours were called The Walk Tour, and The Walk Around the World Tour.

On May 6, 2007, the 10th anniversary of Hanson Day, the band re-recorded their first major label album, Middle Of Nowhere, at The Blank Slate bar in their hometown of Tulsa, Oklahoma. The band invited fan club members to attend, causing hundreds to fly to Oklahoma for the acoustic event. The record Middle of Nowhere Acoustic was released at the end of that year, exclusively on Hanson.net. The record included all but three songs of those originally in Middle of Nowhere ("Speechless", "Thinking of You" and "With You in Your Dreams") and featured the song Yearbook, never performed live before.

=== 2009–2012: Shout It Out ===
In June 2009, Hanson completed the album Shout It Out and planned to release it on June 8, 2010. The band also announced that they would be co-headlining a tour with Hellogoodbye. The tour, called Use Your Sole, started in Hanson's hometown of Tulsa, Oklahoma, on September 30, 2009 and finished November 11, 2009 in Anaheim, California.

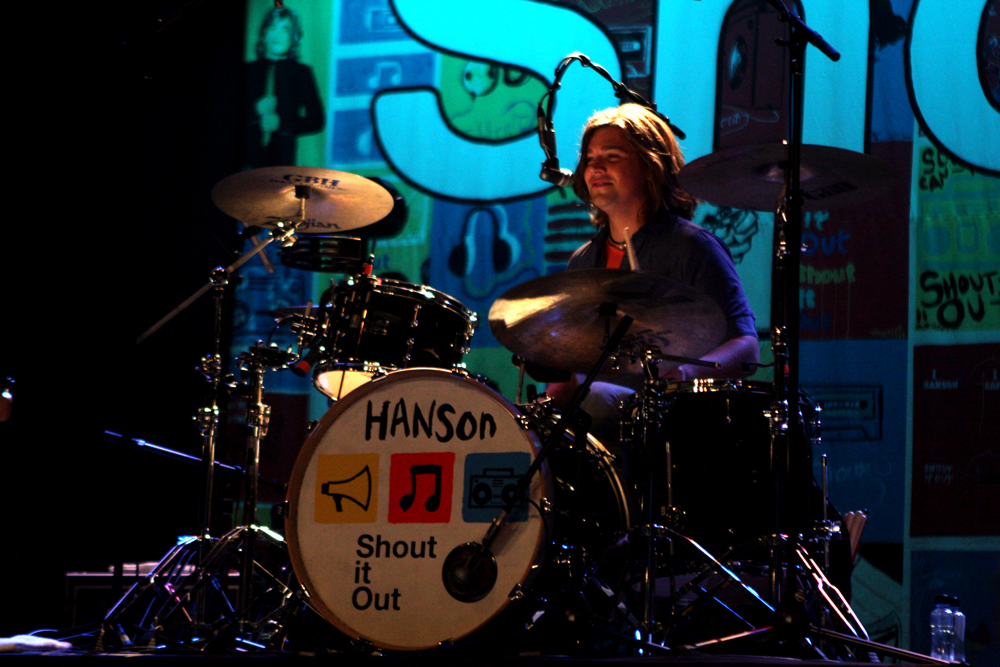
Zac Hanson playing in Sydney, Australia during the Shout It Out tour

Hanson also released Stand Up, Stand Up, a five-song EP that was available at shows and on the band's website. The tracks are acoustic versions of four new Hanson songs, plus the album version of "World's on Fire" which was originally going to be on their album Shout It Out but was ultimately left off the album. It was released worldwide on iTunes on December 8, 2009.

In December 2009, Hanson announced they would play 'Five of Five', five consecutive concerts at New York's Gramercy Theater. Each concert featured one of the band's four previous albums in its entirety and the premiere of their upcoming Spring 2010 release. The engagement began with a performance of Hanson's major label debut, Middle of Nowhere, on April 26, 2010 and then moved onto 2000's This Time Around on April 27, 2004's Underneath followed on April 28 with 2007's The Walk on April 29. On April 30, the band unveiled their new album, Shout It Out. The concert series was also streamed live on band's official website and included an exclusive "Backstage Pass" stream for fan club members. On March 6, 2010, Hanson shot dance and other sequences for their upcoming music video of their new single, "Thinking 'Bout Somethin'", at Greenwood Avenue in Tulsa. Hanson recruited professional dancers for the shoot and also invited fans and local residents to take part in the video, which is an homage to the feature film Blues Brothers. The video was directed by Todd Edwards, co-founder of Blue Yonder Films. It was released for public viewing on their MySpace channel on April 15, 2010. "Weird Al" Yankovic has a cameo appearance as the tambourine player.

On June 8, 2010, Hanson's Shout It Out, their fifth studio record, was released. It debuted at number 30 on the Billboard 200, number 2 on the Indie chart, and No. 16 on the digital chart. On June 15, 2010, the band's free concert at the South Street Seaport in New York City rather incongruously ended in a riot after an estimated 20,000 fans arrived at a venue which could only accommodate half that many people. The rapper Drake was also on the bill. Hanson offered a "platinum package" of their Shout it Out record which included artwork hand-painted by band member Zac Hanson. In October 2010, Hanson released "The 113 Painting Book" which includes the paintings created for these packages. To promote their new album, Shout It Out, Hanson toured from July 2010 through November 2010. The tour kicked off in Buffalo, New York on July 21, with the final show in Toronto, on November 23. Throughout the tour, the band broadcast live streams from their website. The footage included introducing the local musician winners of their opening band contest, a few full length concerts, and walks with fans to fight AIDS and poverty in Africa for their Take the Walk Campaign. One of the most notable concerts included two days in November at Walt Disney World Resort's Food and Wine Festival for the Eat to the Beat concert series.

The band released a second single from Shout It Out in 2011. "Give a Little" reached Top 40 on the US Hot AC charts, making it the first top 40 hit for the band since their 2000 single "If Only". The band resumed their touring activity in September 2011. The US Musical Ride Tour lasted from September 4 to November 1. Starting on November 6 in São Paulo, Brazil, they proceeded to tour Latin America and Europe in order to promote their Shout It Out album internationally. In early 2012, they toured Canada with Carly Rae Jepsen. Later in 2012, they took the Shout It Out world Tour to Philippines and Australia as well.

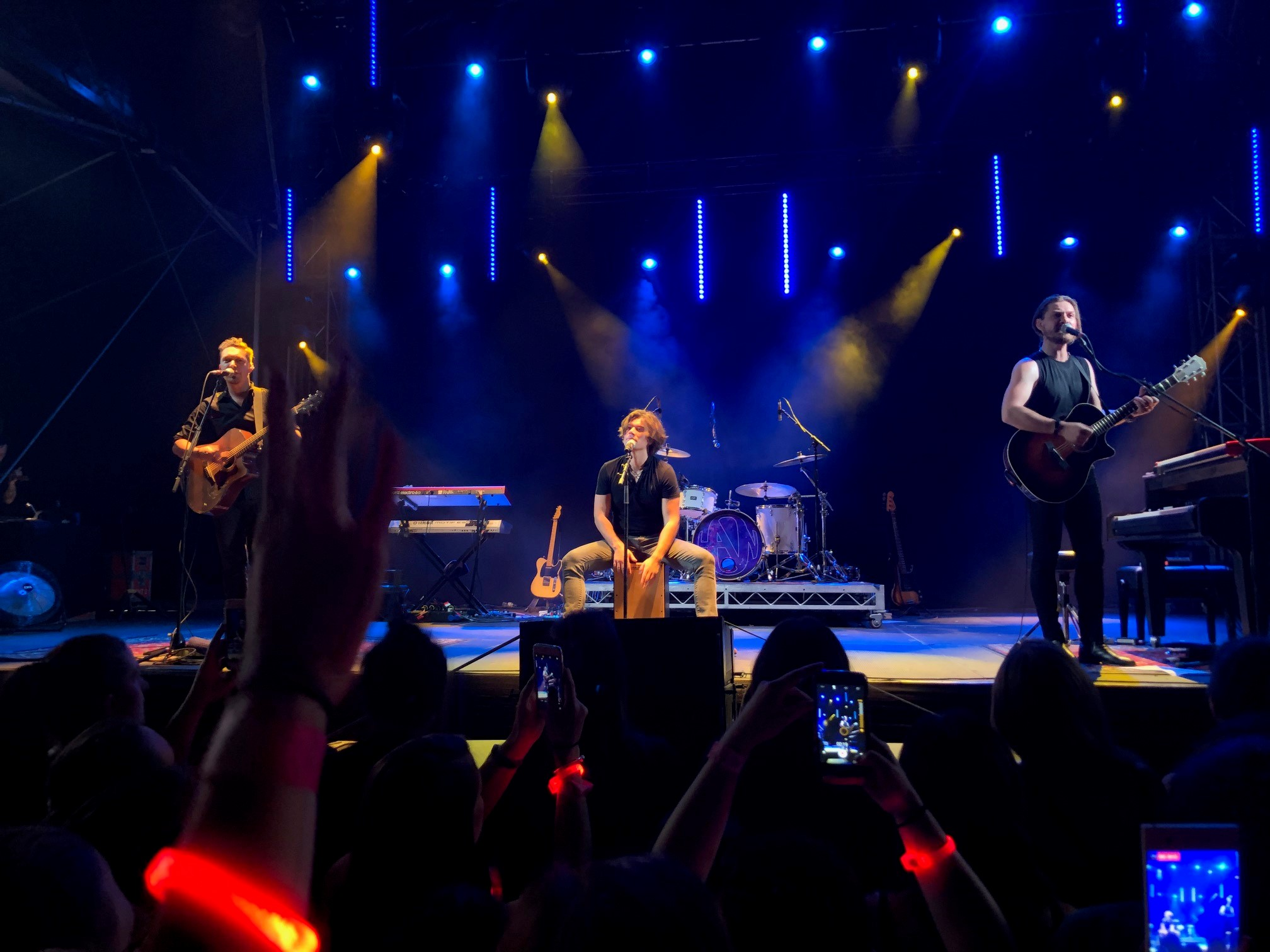
Hanson performing in Australia at the Melbourne Zoo Twilight Concert in March 2019

=== 2013–2020: Anthem, Finally It's Christmas and String Theory ===
Their sixth album Anthem was released on June 18, 2013. The album charted at number 22 on the US Billboard 200, making it their eighth album to reach the top 40 of the Billboard 200; the album also peaked at number 5 on the US Independent Albums chart. The first single is titled "Get the Girl Back", which was released on April 9, 2013. The single charted at number 39 on the Billboard Adult Pop Songs.

On October 23, 2013, Hanson served as guest judges on the popular show Cupcake Wars. Four cupcake bakers fought to the finish for the chance at having their cupcakes at a concert and an after party with the band, and a $10,000 prize.

On March 16, 2017, Hanson announced their 25th anniversary tour called "Middle of Everywhere: 25th Anniversary Tour" to celebrate the band's first signed album release.

Hanson released their second Christmas album, Finally It's Christmas, on October 27, 2017. They also performed a Finally It's Christmas special, which can be found on YouTube. In 2018, they performed backing vocals on the title song for Mike Love's solo album Reason for the Season.

In July 2018, Hanson announced a symphonic tour and accompanying album, titled String Theory, inspired by their bucket list desire to play with a symphony orchestra at iconic venues such as the Sydney Opera House and the Greek Theatre. The tour began in August 2018 and saw them touring the world performing with the backing of local symphony orchestras. The album was released on November 9, 2018 with the symphonic composition recorded in Prague, led by Academy award winning arranger David Campbell. Hanson performed their highlight shows at the Sydney Opera House in Australia over the two nights of March 4th and 5th 2019. Their parents, Walker and Diana, flew to Australia to see their sons perform in the hallowed space. Whilst in Australia, the band played some side gigs at The Melbourne Zoo without the orchestra backing.

On September 13, 2019, Hanson announced their Wintry Mix tour in North America, featuring Paul McDonald and Joshua and the Holy Rollers, led by the youngest Hanson brother, Mac Hanson. During the Wintry Mix tour, Zac was injured in a motorcycle accident on October 2, 2019. Despite the incident, the tour continued, with Zac on percussions and former HAIM drummer Dash Hutton performing in his place.

The band held a series of in-person concerts with accompanying livestreams in Tulsa from October 2020 to January 2021. At each show, 180 in-person tickets were available, making up 10% of the usual capacity of the venue. The theme in October was Live & Electric Revisited", in November it was Perennial Live, in December The Christmas Ball, and in January Listener's Choice. Some fans took issue with the band holding these concerts during the COVID-19 pandemic. During the series, the band also released Perennial, a compilation album with a selection of 20 songs previously only released to fan club members, plus the new song "Nothing Like a Love Song".

=== 2021: Against the World ===
The seven-track album, Against the World was released officially in November 2021 after the band released a song a month with a corresponding video over the course of seven months in 2021. The album was recorded at FAME Studios in Muscle Shoals, Alabama. The album's theme is about facing adversity in its many forms, and seeking a way forward.

=== 2022: Red Green Blue (RGB) ===
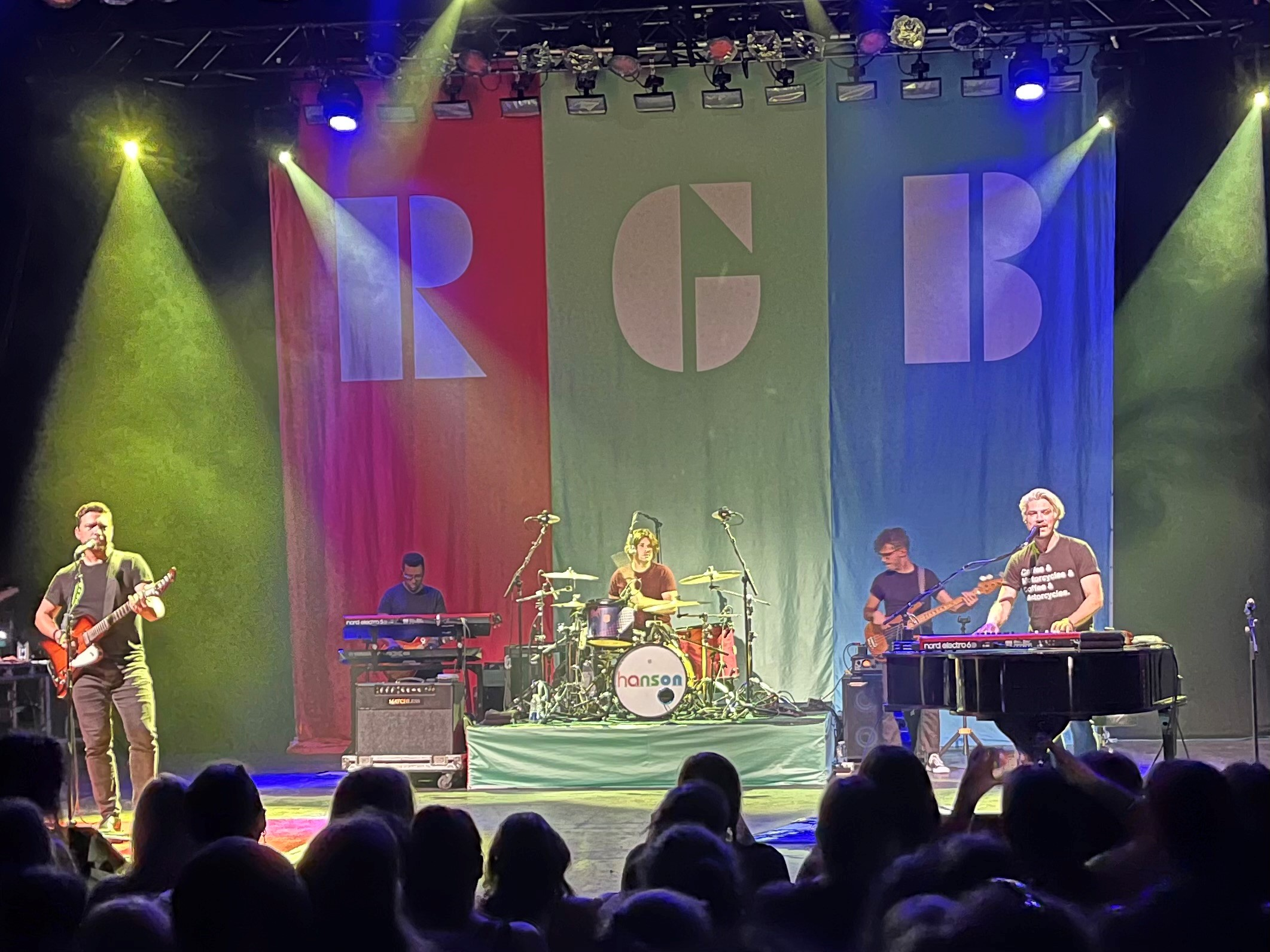
Hanson performing at the Danforth Music Hall in Toronto on their RGB tour, August 3, 2022

The album RGB (Red Green Blue) was released in 2022. Red Green Blue is a blend of a five-song mini album crafted by each individual brother: RED for Taylor, GREEN for Isaac and BLUE for Zac. Each brother produced their third of the album individually with the help of award-winning producers Jim Scott and David Garza, with two of the three band members, Zac and Taylor, writing all their songs, whereas Isaac wrote a couple of songs, covered a song of their younger brother Mac's band, and co-wrote the remaining songs.

Each portion is unique to the individual brother, but doesn't stick to one genre. Taylor Hanson's Red portion tends to lean more toward a rootsy Americana sound. For Isaac's Green portion, there's more of an intimate and vintage sound. Zac's Blue has a more contemporary sound, mixing in pop, rock and alt-country. The three released singles from the album. Taylor's "Child At Heart" depicts a series of inflicted wounds and tragedies as a metaphor for the pain of life and love. It sees Taylor getting punched and a glass of water thrown on him in the video clip. Isaac's "Write You A Song" was written for his daughter, Odette, who requested he write a song for her. She features in the clip that was premiered on CMT. Zac's song "Don't Let Me Down" features Frankie Muniz and a cast of others in the beefcake fun video.

Hanson set out on a world tour from June to November 2022.

The brothers were featured in the July 18, 2022, issue of People discussing their career thus far, family commitments, and being on the road. The article also showcased photos of their individual family members.

On May 26, 2023, British band Busted released "MMMBop 2.0", a cover version of "MMMBop" in collaboration with Hanson.

== Other endeavors ==
Hanson pioneered many things in the early days of the internet. In 1997, they were one of the first major-label bands to have a website and an email address promoted in the sleeve of their second album, Middle of Nowhere. By 1999, they had their own virtual world titled Hanson World and launched Hanson.net, a paid-membership fan portal that gave users exclusive content. The band started live-streaming and uploading videos to their website around this time, before YouTube existed. A phone hotline also existed for fans that would play a recorded message from the band with their latest news.

Hanson occasionally host a songwriting retreat known as Fools' Banquet (sporadically between 2004 and 2015), where they invite musician friends to spend a week collaborating on writing and recording new songs. In the early years, most of the songs that came from Fools' Banquet collaborations featured on Hanson's fan club only albums. Artists that have attended over the years include Andrew W.K., Ben Kweller, Imani Coppola, Sandra McCracken, "Weird Al" Yankovic, Adam Green and Pedro Yanowitz. Some songs that have been born and released as a result of Fools' Banquet collaborations have been: We are All Women released by Andrew W.K. and Battle Cry released by both Hanson and Everybody Else.

Back to the Island (BTTI) is a week-long destination concert event for fans, held annually at a resort in Jamaica. Attendees have the opportunity to participate in exclusive events with each member of the band, obtain exclusive merchandise, plus see the band give live performances.

In early 2009 Taylor Hanson launched a separate project including members of Smashing Pumpkins, Fountains of Wayne and Cheap Trick called Tinted Windows, a power pop quartet whose debut album quickly earned critical praise and repeat airplay on leading syndicated FM radio programs.

Hanson was the musical guest at the Tulsa stop of The Legally Prohibited from Being Funny on Television Tour starring Conan O'Brien on May 15, 2010. Conan accompanied the band in playing a cover of the song "Never Been to Spain" by American singer songwriter Hoyt Axton. In June 2010, Hanson performed with former American Idol contestant Siobhan Magnus.

As an April Fools' Day joke in 2011, Hanson covered the song "Wait and Bleed" by the heavy metal band Slipknot, and the website Shockhound claimed that Hanson would record an entire album of Slipknot covers.

On April 25, 2011, Hanson sang its hit "MMMBop" on the American version of Dancing with the Stars. The band also makes a cameo in Katy Perry's music video for her song "Last Friday Night (T.G.I.F.)".

In 2012, Hanson was mentioned in an episode of The Mentalist titled Ruby Slippers, as Grace Van Pelt admits her room was full of their posters when she was a teenager.

In May 2013, they launched their own beer: Mmmhops. The Hanson brothers partnered with craft beer company Mustang Brewing to create the drink as their way of raising a toast to their 21st anniversary. Hanson shared the first taste of the beer with those attending the premiere of The Hangover Part III.

Hanson appeared as dining room guests in the 15th episode of Hell's Kitchen season 13.

In 2015, Hanson appeared on Blues Traveler's album Blow Up the Moon, co-writing the song "Top of the World". In June 2015, they appeared on Owl City's fifth studio album, Mobile Orchestra, in the song "Unbelievable" as his third single for the album.

In July 2016, the group performed on ABC's Greatest Hits.

In 2016, the band performed the song "Him or Me", a cover of the song by Paul Revere & the Raiders, on Bun E. Carlos' solo album called "Greetings From Bunezuela!"

On May 29, 2017 (Memorial Day), Hanson performed live on ABC's Good Morning America to commemorate their 25th year together and promote their new song.

In 2019, the band made a cameo appearance in Australian soap opera Neighbours.

In 2021, Hanson competed in season five of The Masked Singer as the "Russian Dolls", being the first band to compete on the series. The character performed in two costumes during the first and fifth performances and performed in three costumes for the second and third performances. Performances that utilized four costumes had one of them being used as a prop. When unmasked by Nick Cannon and the Men in Black on Week 9 of the fifth season, Taylor, Isaac, and Zac Hanson were underneath the main Russian Doll costume. Their elimination in May 2021 coincided with the release of "Annalie", the first single from their 2021 seven-single album Against the World.

== Philanthropy ==
In July 2006, the band recorded with a school choir in Soweto, South Africa to create "Great Divide", which was released in the UK and U.S. through iTunes in December 2006. All proceeds from the song were directed toward research and prevention of AIDS in Africa.

On September 10, 2007, Hanson began "The Walk Tour" in Nashville. During the tour, Hanson continued their work against poverty and AIDS in Africa, partnering with an American company, TOMS Shoes. As part of TOMS' "Shoe Drop", for every pair of shoes sold, the company donated another pair for a child in Africa.

== Controversies ==
Details of Zac's Pinterest account were leaked in November 2020, described by Ashley Spencer of Vice as "a trove of pro-gun memes, many of which were racist, transphobic, homophobic, and sexist". The now-deleted account shared memes that commentators characterized as supporting George Zimmerman in the killing of Trayvon Martin, comparing the right to use an AR-15 rifle with Rosa Parks' right to sit on a bus, suggesting that men cannot support gun control without being gay, and insisting that any "man wanting to dress like a woman" must be mentally ill. After first defending the posts, he apologized and said, "The leaked Pinterest page provided a distorted view of the issues surrounding race and social justice, which do not reflect my personal beliefs. I apologize for the hurt my actions caused."

Later that month, Isaac addressed the COVID-19 pandemic and wrote on his Instagram story that Christians would soon have to decide whether their faith was more important than "their fear" due to Christmas, Easter, and Thanksgiving being "cancelled" by the government. He also wrote that he "will not comply" and that he fears God more than death or the government. He later apologized and said, "What I shared was driven by an emotional reaction to a recent personal experience. I'm sorry for the pain and worry that my posts caused. I don't believe there is a group conspiring against Christmas, only that I hope value is placed on both practices of safety and of faith."

== Band members ==
=== Isaac Hanson ===
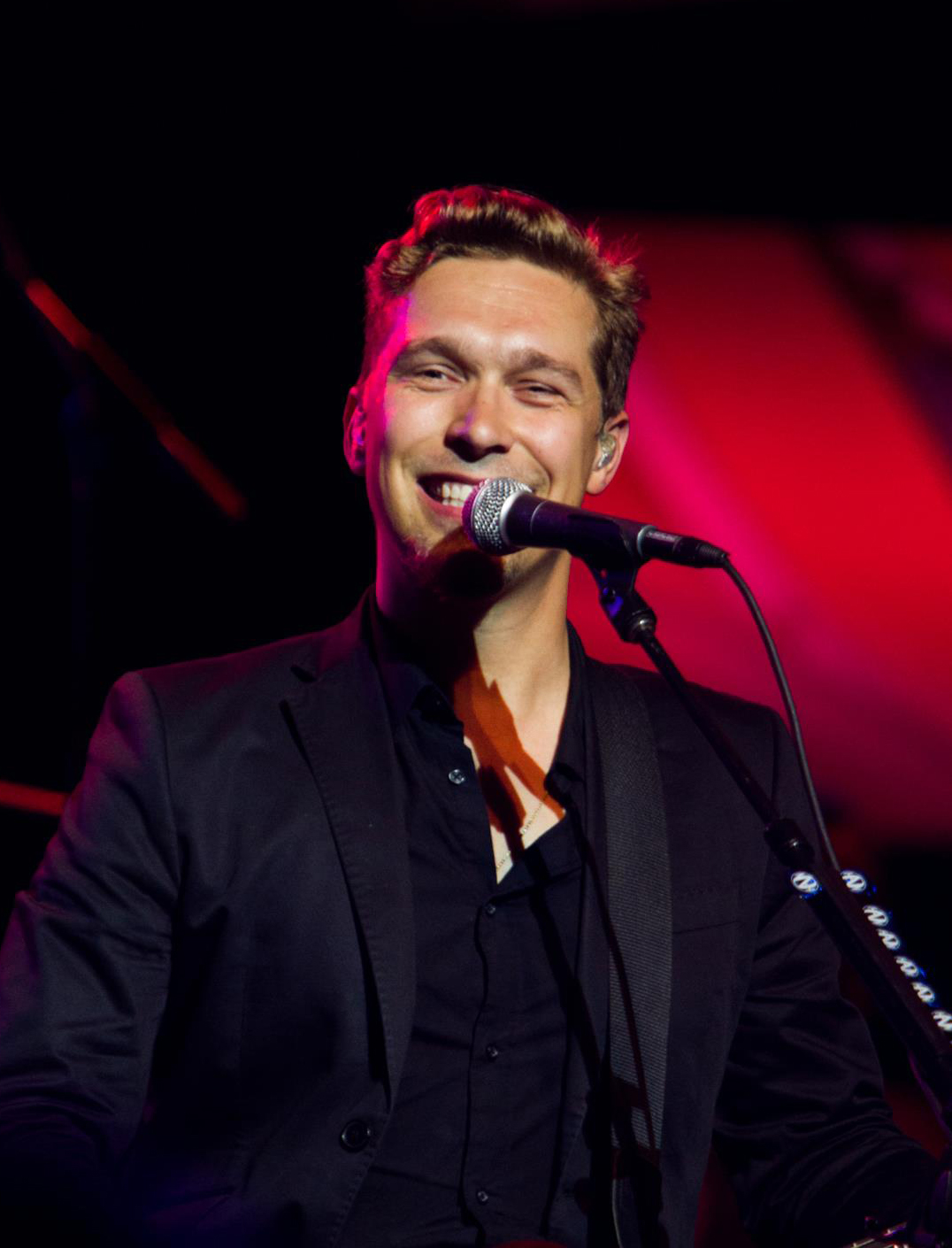
Isaac Hanson

Clarke Isaac Hanson was born on November 17, 1980, in Tulsa, Oklahoma. He is of Danish, English, Irish and German descent. He is the eldest of the three brothers in Hanson, and was eleven when the band started in 1992. He sings both backing & lead vocals and plays electric & acoustic guitar, as well as the piano, bass guitar and synthesizer. Isaac married Nikki Dufresne on September 30, 2006, in Tulsa at the Philbrook Museum of Art. Isaac met Dufresne after spotting her in the fifth row of a crowd at their 2003 New Orleans concert. They have three children.

=== Taylor Hanson ===
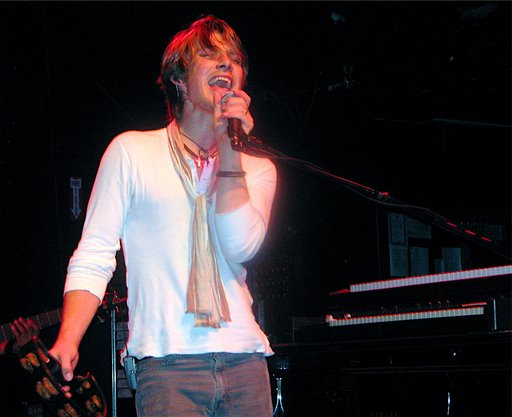
Taylor Hanson

Jordan Taylor Hanson was born on March 14, 1983, in Tulsa, Oklahoma. He is of Danish, English, Irish and German descent. Taylor was nine when Hanson started in 1992. In Hanson, he sings both lead & backing vocals and plays keyboards, percussion (including drums, bongos and the tambourine), guitar, harmonica and piano. He is also the lead singer of supergroup Tinted Windows. On June 8, 2002, Taylor married Natalie Anne Bryant, whom he had first met in 2000. They have seven children.

=== Zac Hanson ===
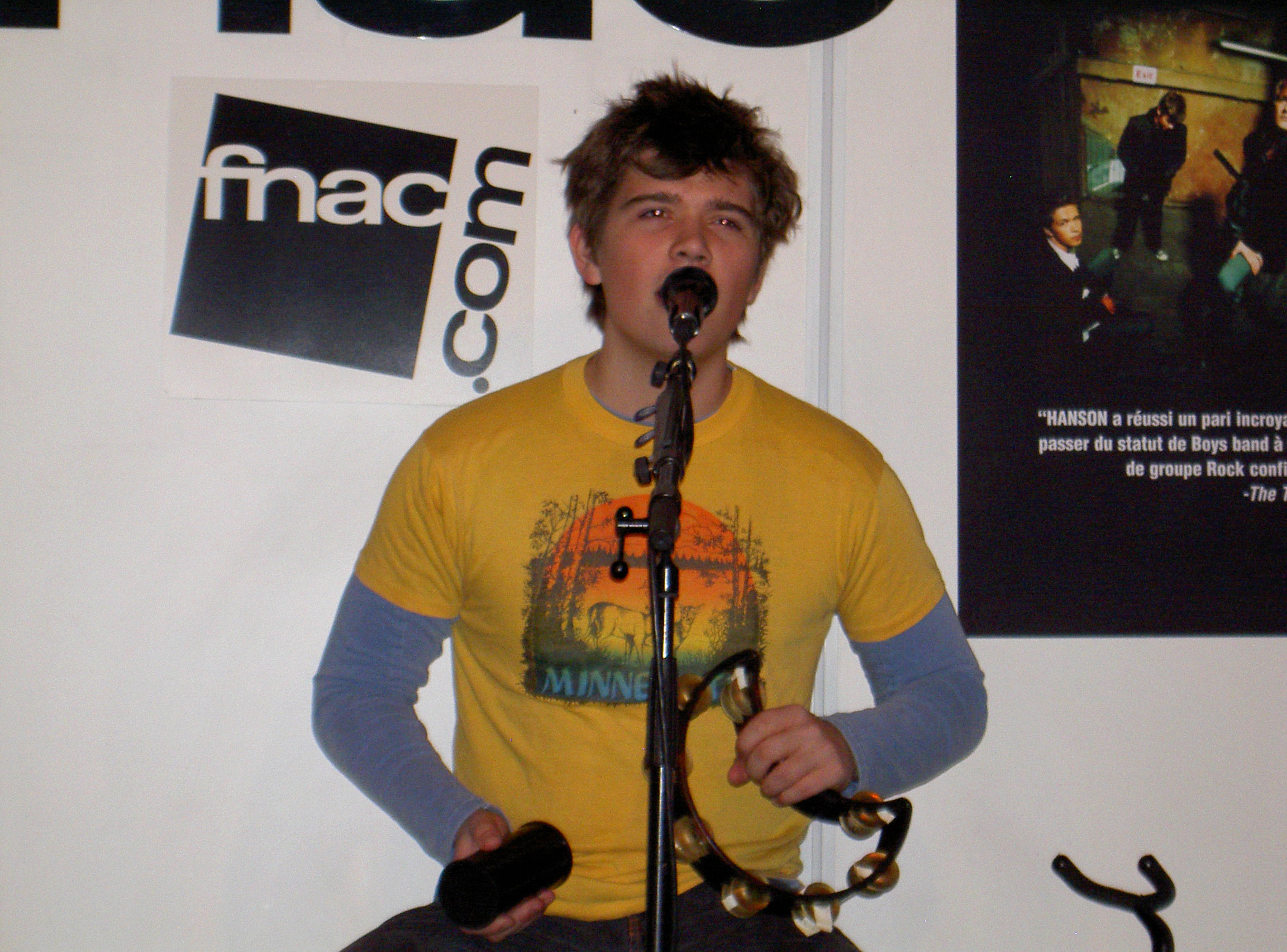
Zac Hanson

Zachary Walker Hanson was born on October 22, 1985, in Arlington, Virginia, but raised in Tulsa, Oklahoma. He is of Danish, English, Irish and German descent. He is the youngest of the three brothers in Hanson, and was six when the band started in 1992. He plays drums, percussion, piano, guitar and also sings backing & lead vocals in the band. Zac, at age 12 years and 126 days, is the ninth-youngest Grammy nominee of all time. He holds the title of youngest songwriter nominated for a Grammy Award (same year).

Zac married Kate Tucker on June 3, 2006. They have five children. On October 2, 2019, Zac was involved in a motorcycle accident in Tulsa that resulted in five broken bones: three broken ribs, a broken clavicle, and a cracked scapula.

Details of Zac's Pinterest account were leaked in November 2020, described by Ashley Spencer of Vice as "a trove of pro-gun memes, many of which were racist, transphobic, homophobic, and sexist". The now-deleted account shared memes that commentators characterized as supporting George Zimmerman in the killing of Trayvon Martin, comparing the right to use an AR-15 rifle with Rosa Parks' right to sit on a bus, suggesting that men cannot support gun control without being gay, and insisting that any "man wanting to dress like a woman" must be mentally ill. After first defending the posts, he apologized and said, "The leaked Pinterest page provided a distorted view of the issues surrounding race and social justice, which do not reflect my personal beliefs. I apologize for the hurt my actions caused."

Zac and his family are also gamers, and currently run Zaccidental Gamer, a gaming channel on YouTube where they play such games as Minecraft Dungeons, Halo Infinite, and more. In February 2023, Zac was ordained as a deacon in the Eastern Orthodox Church.

== Discography ==
- Middle of Nowhere (1997)
- Snowed In (1997)
- This Time Around (2000)
- Underneath (2004)
- The Walk (2007)
- Shout It Out (2010)
- Anthem (2013)
- Finally It's Christmas (2017)
- String Theory (2018)
- Against the World (2021)
- Red Green Blue (2022)

== Concert tours ==
- Albertane Tour (1998)
- This Time Around Tour (2000)
- Underneath Acoustic Tour (2003)
- Underneath Tour (2004–05)
- Live and Electric Tour (2005)
- The Walk Tour (2007–08)
- The Walk Around the World Tour (2008)
- Use Your Sole Tour (2009)
- Shout It Out Tour (2010)
- 5 of 5 (2010–11)
- The Musical Ride Tour (2011)
- Shout It Out World Tour (2011–12)
- Anthem World Tour (2013–14)
- Roots & Rock 'N' Roll Tour (2015)
- Middle of Everywhere: 25th Anniversary Tour (2017)
- Finally, It's Christmas Tour (2017)
- String Theory Tour (2018–19)
- Wintry Mix Tour (2019)
- Streaming Concert Series (2020–21)
- Against the World+ (2021)
- Red Green Blue Tour (2022)
- Underneath Complete Tour (2024)

== Filmography ==
- Yo! Kidz: The Vidz (1994)
- The Weird Al Show (S01E06; October 18, 1997)
- Tulsa, Tokyo & the Middle of Nowhere (November 18, 1997)
- The Road to Albertane (November 3, 1998)
- Buddy Faro (S01E08; December 4, 1998)
- Melrose Place (S07E19 – "Usual Santas"; 1999)
- Space Ghost Coast to Coast (S06E03 – "Girl Hair"; October 22, 1999)
- Noah Knows Best (November 18, 2000)
- At the Fillmore (April 24, 2001)
- Frank McKlusky, C.I. (2002)
- Sabrina the Teenage Witch (2002)
- Underneath Acoustic Live (July 27, 2004)
- Strong Enough to Break (2006)
- Taking the Walk (2008)
- 5 of 5 (November 30, 2010)
- "Last Friday Night (T.G.I.F.)" (2011); Katy Perry music video
- Re:Made in America (2013)
- The Masked Singer (2021) - Russian Dolls

== Awards and nominations ==
Year	Awards	Work	Category	Result	Ref.
1997	MTV Europe Music Awards	"Where's the Love"	MTV Select	Nominated	
1997	MTV Europe Music Awards	"MMMBop"	Best Song	Won	
1997	MTV Europe Music Awards	Themselves	Best New Act	Won	
1997	Denmark GAFFA Awards	Themselves	Foreign New Act	Nominated	
1997	Billboard Music Awards	Themselves	Top Pop Artist – Duo/Group	Nominated	
1997	Billboard Music Awards	Themselves	Top New Pop Artist	Nominated	
1997	Billboard Music Awards	Themselves	Top Hot 100 Artist – Duo/Group	Nominated	
1997	Billboard Music Awards	Themselves	Top Billboard 200 Artist – Duo/Group	Nominated	
1998	Billboard Music Awards	Themselves	Top Billboard 200 Artist – Duo/Group	Nominated	
1998	Japan Gold Disc Awards	Themselves	New Artist of the Year	Won	
1998	ECHO Awards	Themselves	Best International Newcomer	Won	
1998	World Music Awards	Themselves	World's Best Selling New Artist	Won	
1998	Brit Awards	Themselves	Best International Group	Nominated	
1998	Brit Awards	Themselves	International Breakthrough Act	Nominated	
1998	Blockbuster Entertainment Awards	Themselves	Favorite Group – Pop	Nominated	
1998	Blockbuster Entertainment Awards	Themselves	Favorite Group – New Artist	Nominated	
1998	Kids' Choice Awards	Themselves	Favorite Music Group	Won	
1998	Kids' Choice Awards	"MMMBop"	Favorite Song	Won	
1998	NARM Awards	Snowed In	Best Selling Holiday Album	Won	
1998	NARM Awards	Live from Albertane	Best Selling Music Video	Won	
1998	Grammy Awards	Themselves	Best New Artist	Nominated	
1998	Grammy Awards	"MMMBop"	Record of the Year	Nominated	
1998	Grammy Awards	"MMMBop"	Best Pop Performance by a Duo or Group with Vocals	Nominated	
2000	Online Music Awards	Taylor Hanson	Sexiest Male	Nominated	
2005	MTV Video Music Brazil	"Penny & Me"	Best International Video	Nominated	
2005	Lunas del Auditorio	Themselves	Best Foreign Pop Artist	Nominated	
2012	Lunas del Auditorio	Themselves	Best Foreign Pop Artist	Nominated	
