= MMMBop =

1997 single by Hanson

Single by Hanson

from the album Middle of Nowhere
- B-side: "Where's the Love"
- Released: March 24, 1997
- Recorded: 1995 (MMMBop, 3 Car Garage version); 1996 (Middle of Nowhere version)
- Genre: Pop
- Length: 4:28 (album version); 3:58 (single version)
- Label: Mercury
- Songwriters: Isaac Hanson; Taylor Hanson; Zac Hanson
- Producers: Dust Brothers; Stephen Lironi

Hanson singles chronology
"MMMBop" (1997)	"Where's the Love" (1997)

Audio sample
- file; help

Music video
- "MMMBop" on YouTube

"MMMBop" is a song written and performed by American pop rock band Hanson. It was released on March 24, 1997, by Mercury Records as the lead single from their first full-length studio album, Middle of Nowhere (1997). The song is the band's most successful single to date and was nominated for Record of the Year and Best Pop Performance by a Duo or Group with Vocals at the 40th Annual Grammy Awards. "MMMBop" was a major success worldwide, reaching number one in at least 12 countries, including Australia, Canada, Germany, New Zealand, the United Kingdom, and the United States. Its music video was directed by Tamra Davis.

The song was voted the best single of the year in The Village Voice Pazz & Jop critics poll, while also topping critics' polls from such media as Rolling Stone, Spin, and VH1, and was ranked number 20 on VH1's "100 Greatest Songs of the 90s", as well as number 98 on VH1's "100 Greatest Songs of the Past 25 Years". In 2023, Hanson released a new version of "MMMBop", entitled "MMMBop 2.0", in collaboration with English pop punk band Busted.

== Background and composition ==
The song "MMMBop" originally appeared on Hanson's 1996 independent album MMMBop with a slower tempo, but was reworked as an upbeat pop track by producers the Dust Brothers. This became the hit version. In an August 2004 interview with Songfacts, Zac Hanson explained the song's origins, and described how it began as "the background part for another song", when the band were making their first independent album.

Zac Hanson described the song as being about "[holding] onto the things that really matter". He stated that whilst the lyrics were not inspired by any specific artists, the song was inspired by 1950s and 1960s vocal groups such as The Beach Boys.

"MMMBop" is written and composed in the key of A major.

== Critical reception ==
Larry Flick from Billboard magazine wrote, "The rush of youth-driven acts on radio accelerates with the onset of this candy-coated pop confection. Try to imagine what the Jackson 5 might sound like with the accompaniment of a skittling funk beat and scratchy faux-grunge guitars, and you will have a clear picture of where Hanson is coming from. Initially it's a mildly jarring combination, but it's ultimately quite cool. Factor in an instantly catchy chorus, and you have the making of a runaway smash." A reviewer from Scottish Daily Record noted, "They're about half the age of the Spice Girls, but Hanson can sing, play their own instruments and string a sentence together. It must be their American upbringing." Sara Scribner from Los Angeles Times named it "a lighthearted dollop of nonsensical pop." A reviewer from Music Week gave the song four out of five, stating that "media attention is sky high for these three Tulsa brothers, aged 11, 14 and 16. And this cutesy, catchy pop song is the ideal debut single to cash in on that interest."

Chuck Eddy of Rolling Stone felt it "sticks in your brain like Trident in your shag carpet." He explained, "Built on a turntable-scratch update of the soul rhythms that served as turn-of-the-'70s bubblegum rock's secret weapon, the song is as unintelligible as it is indelible. Its hooks suburbanize the Jackson 5 as expertly as the Osmonds used to, but whether its quivering lyrics really deal with chewing (a favorite bubble entendre since the Ohio Express' "Chewy Chewy") is anybody's guess." Ben Knowles from Smash Hits said "MMMBop" sounded like "a one-off, tasty, unbelievably ear-tingling, perfect pop treat." Ian Hyland from Sunday Mirror gave the song eight out of ten, commenting, "Teenage brothers from America who sound a bit like Sheryl Crow on helium. You'll love this at first, but in a few weeks you'll be kicking the TV in whenever their smiley faces appear." David Sinclair from The Times concluded, "No 1 in America and all over British radio like a rash, it sounds like a gilt-edged pop standard already."

== Chart performance ==
On the chart dated May 3, 1997, "MMMBop" debuted at number 16 on the US Billboard Hot 100. On the chart dated May 10, 1997, the song rose to No. 6. It continued to rise the next week, reaching No. 2. On the chart dated May 24, 1997, the song topped the Billboard Hot 100, staying there for three weeks before falling to No. 2. In the United Kingdom, the imported US CD single charted on May 18, 1997, appearing at number 138 on the UK Singles Chart. Two weeks later, the official UK release debuted at number one and stayed atop the chart for three weeks.

== Music video ==
A music video was produced to promote the single, directed by American film, television and music video director Tamra Davis. It features the Hanson brothers singing and playing their instruments in a suburban living room. In between, there are clips of them entering a cave, ending up on a beach. Other scenes show them playing around in a city, dancing on the Moon, driving a car or appearing in old footage of Albert Einstein.

== Legacy ==
"MMMBop" was voted the best single of the year in The Village Voice Pazz & Jop critics poll, while also topping critics' polls from such media as Rolling Stone, Spin, and VH1, and was ranked number 20 on VH1's "100 Greatest Songs of the 90s", as well as number 98 on VH1's "100 Greatest Songs of the Past 25 Years". In 2003, English music journalist Paul Morley included "MMMBop" in his list of "Greatest Pop Single of All Time". In 2021, Rolling Stone ranked it as the ninth-best boy band song of all time.

== Track listings ==
All songs were written by Isaac Hanson, Taylor Hanson, and Zac Hanson. Additional songwriters are noted in parentheses.

- US and Australian CD and cassette single
1. "MMMBop" (radio version) – 3:50
2. "MMMBop" (Dust Brothers mix) – 4:29
- US 7-inch single

A. "MMMBop" – 4:27
B. "Where's the Love" (Mark Hudson, Sander Salover) – 4:12

- US 12-inch single

A1. "MMMBop" (Berman Brothers club mix) – 5:14
A2. "MMMBop" (Berman Brothers club instrumental) – 5:14
B1. "MMMBop" (soulful club mix) – 5:27
B2. "MMMBop" (Berman Brothers radio mix) – 3:17
B3. "MMMBop" – 4:27

- UK CD single
1. "MMMBop" (single version) – 3:50
2. "MMMBop" (album version) – 4:27
3. "MMMBop" (Dust Brothers mix) – 4:29
4. "MMMBop" (Hex mix) – 3:25
- UK cassette single and European CD single
1. "MMMBop" (single version) – 3:50
2. "MMMBop" (album version) – 4:27
- Japanese CD single
1. "MMMBop" (single version) – 3:59
2. "MMMBop" (album version) – 4:27
3. "MMMBop" (Dust Brothers mix) – 4:29
4. "MMMBop" (dub mix) – 4:20

== Charts ==
=== Weekly charts ===
Chart (1997)	Peak position
Australia (ARIA)	1
Austria (Ö3 Austria Top 40)	1
Belgium (Ultratop 50 Flanders)	1
Belgium (Ultratop 50 Wallonia)	4
Canada (Nielsen Soundscan)	2
Canada Top Singles (RPM)	1
Canada Adult Contemporary (RPM)	5
Denmark (IFPI)	1
Estonia (Eesti Top 20)	2
Estonia Airplay (Eesti Top 25)	1
Europe (European Hot 100)	1
Europe (European Hit Radio)	1
Finland (Suomen virallinen lista)	4
Finland Airplay (Radiosoittolista)	1
France (SNEP)	4
France Airplay (SNEP)	1
Germany (GfK)	1
Greece (IFPI Greece)	1
Hungary (Mahasz)	1
Iceland (Íslenski Listinn Topp 40)	8
Ireland (IRMA)	1
Israel (Israeli Singles Chart)	1
Italy (FIMI)	2
Italy (Musica e dischi)	19
Italy Airplay (Music & Media)	1
Latvia (Latvijas Top 20)	5
Mexico (Notitas Musicales)	1
Netherlands (Dutch Top 40)	2
Netherlands (Single Top 100)	2
New Zealand (Recorded Music NZ)	1
Norway (VG-lista)	2
Poland Airplay (Music & Media)	6
Scottish Singles Sales (Official Charts)	1
Spain (AFYVE)	3
Spain Airplay (Top 40 Radio)	1
Sweden (Sverigetopplistan)	1
Switzerland (Schweizer Hitparade)	1
UK Singles (Official Charts)	1
UK Airplay (Music Week)	1
US Billboard Hot 100	1
US Adult Contemporary (Billboard)	21
US Adult Pop Airplay (Billboard)	5
US Dance Singles Sales (Billboard)	23
US Pop Airplay (Billboard)	1
US Rhythmic Airplay (Billboard)	13

=== Year-end charts ===
Chart (1997)	Position
Australia (ARIA)	5
Austria (Ö3 Austria Top 40)	7
Belgium (Ultratop 50 Flanders)	11
Belgium (Ultratop 50 Wallonia)	14
Brazil (Crowley)	21
Canada Top Singles (RPM)	4
Canada Adult Contemporary (RPM)	39
Europe (Eurochart Hot 100)	10
Europe (European Hit Radio)	2
France (SNEP)	12
France Airplay (SNEP)	17
Germany (Media Control)	16
Iceland (Íslenski Listinn Topp 40)	76
Israel (Israeli Singles Chart)	4
Latvia (Latvijas Top 50)	32
Netherlands (Dutch Top 40)	18
Netherlands (Single Top 100)	18
New Zealand (RIANZ)	4
Norway (VG-lista)	8
Romania (Romanian Top 100)	31
Sweden (Topplistan)	6
Switzerland (Schweizer Hitparade)	10
UK Singles (OCC)	11
UK Airplay (Music Week)	17
US Billboard Hot 100	12
US Adult Top 40 (Billboard)	22
US Rhythmic Top 40 (Billboard)	60
US Top 40/Mainstream (Billboard)	9

=== Decade-end charts ===
Chart (1990–1999)	Position
UK Singles (OCC)	63
US Billboard Hot 100	57

== Certifications ==
Region	Certification	Certified units/sales
Australia (ARIA)	2× Platinum	140,000^{^}
Austria (IFPI Austria)	Gold	25,000^{*}
Belgium (BRMA)	Platinum	50,000^{*}
Germany (BVMI)	Platinum	500,000^{^}
New Zealand (RMNZ)	2× Platinum	60,000^{‡}
Sweden (GLF)	Platinum	30,000^{^}
Switzerland (IFPI Switzerland)	Gold	25,000^{^}
United Kingdom (BPI)	Platinum	758,000
United States (RIAA)	Platinum	1,500,000
^{*} Sales figures based on certification alone.^{^} Shipments figures based on certification alone.^{‡} Sales+streaming figures based on certification alone.

== Release history ==
Region	Date	Format(s)	Label(s)	Ref(s).
United States	March 24, 1997	Top 40 radio	Mercury	
United States	April 15, 1997	7-inch vinyl; CD; cassette	Mercury	
United Kingdom	May 26, 1997	CD; cassette	Mercury	
Japan	June 4, 1997	Mini-CD	Mercury	
Japan	June 20, 1997	CD	Mercury	

== Notable cover versions ==
Twenty years after the first recording of "MMMBop", approximately 93,000 cover versions of the song were counted by MTV reporter Patrick Hosken in March 2016, as represented on YouTube. The Hansons told Rebecca Milzoff at Vulture that they had not heard any good cover versions, because "People can't sing the chorus right. Most of the time they syncopate it wrong," according to Isaac Hanson. Later that year, Postmodern Jukebox recorded a cover in the style of 1950s swinging doo-wop with four male singers; picking up 1.5 million views on YouTube in the first year. In July 2019, the official Hanson Twitter feed shared a video by Scary Pockets, a band founded by keyboardist Jack Conte. The Scary Pockets version was fronted by Lucy Schwartz on lead vocals, and Adam Neely covered the electric bass.

In 2023, English band Busted released a cover version of the song, in collaboration with Hanson, for their album Greatest Hits 2.0. The new version, "MMMBop 2.0", was released as a single worldwide on May 26, 2023. It peaked at number 10 on the UK Singles Sales Chart.
