= Taylor Hanson =

American musician (born 1983)

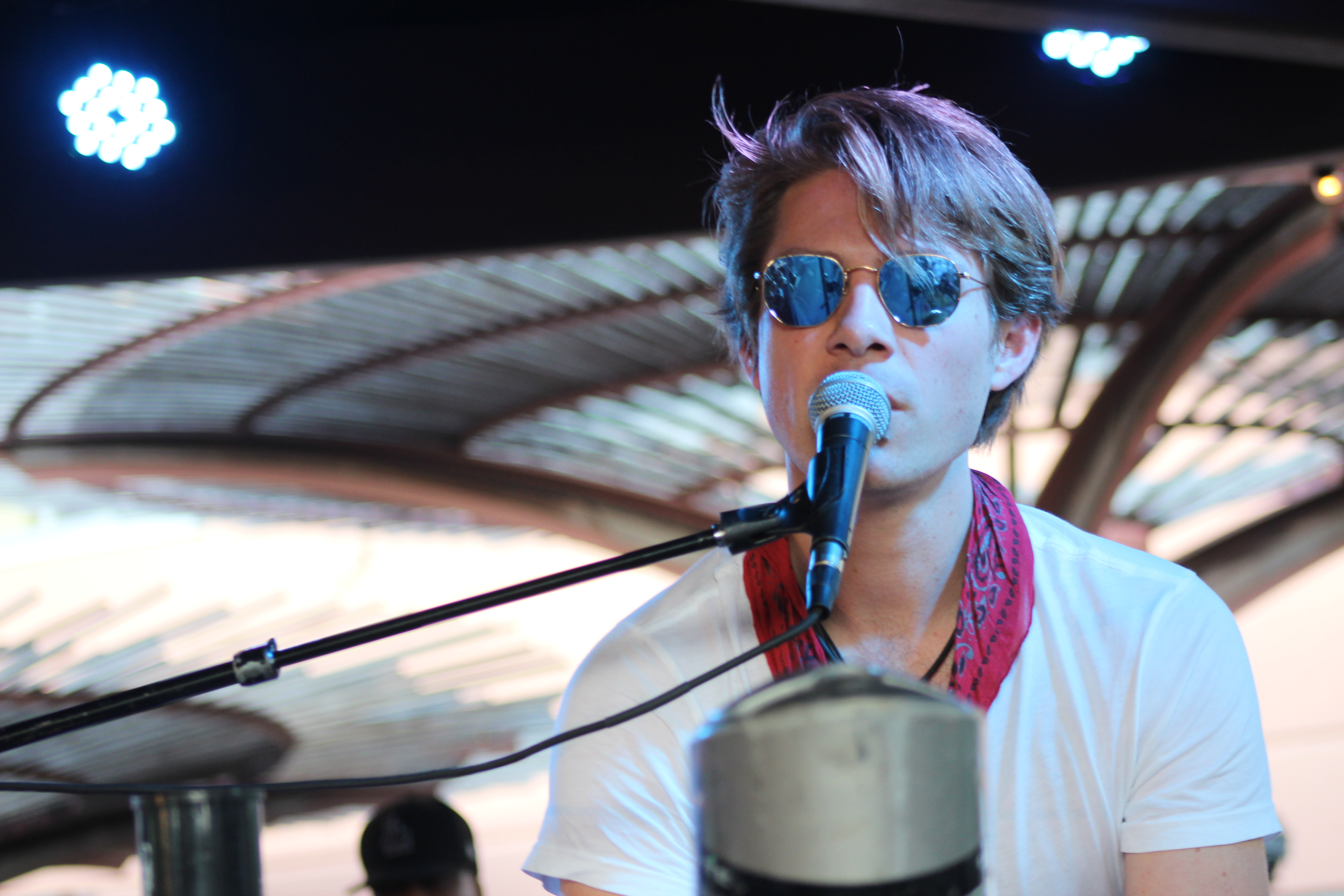
- Hanson in 2017

Background information
- Born: Jordan Taylor Hanson; March 14, 1983 (age 43); Jenks, Oklahoma, U.S.
- Genres: Power pop; pop rock
- Occupation: Musician
- Instruments: Vocals; keyboards; percussion; drums; guitar; harmonica
- Years active: 1992–present
- Labels: Mercury; Island; 3CG; S-Curve
- Spouse: Natalie Anne Bryant (m. 2002)

Jordan Taylor Hanson (born March 14, 1983) is an American musician best known as a member of the eponymous pop rock band Hanson. He sings both lead and back-up vocals, and plays keyboard, percussion (including drums, bongos and the tambourine), guitar, harmonica, and piano. Hanson was also lead singer of the supergroup Tinted Windows.

== Early life ==
Hanson was born the second of seven children to Diana Frances (née Lawyer) Hanson and Clarke Walker Hanson in Jenks, Oklahoma, a suburb of Tulsa. He has partial Danish ancestry.

== Music career ==
Taylor Hanson sings and plays keyboard and piano with the band Hanson. He and older brother Isaac started the band with younger sibling Zac in 1992, and were initially known as The Hanson Brothers (later changed to just Hanson). At the time, Isaac was eleven, Taylor was nine, and Zac was six. They performed as an a cappella group outside clubs in Tulsa. On May 6, 1997, Hanson released their first major studio album, Middle of Nowhere, on Mercury Records. The first single, "MMMBop", hit number one on the Billboard Hot 100 chart.

May 6 has been declared Hanson Day in Tulsa in honor of the release of Middle of Nowhere. Each year, the band hosts concerts and celebrations in Tulsa, and fans travel from around the world to attend.

In 2003, Taylor, Isaac and Zac Hanson co-founded 3CG Records.

It was announced in early 2009 that Taylor Hanson, along with former Smashing Pumpkins guitarist James Iha, Cheap Trick drummer Bun E. Carlos and Fountains of Wayne bassist Adam Schlesinger, had formed a new band called Tinted Windows. The group played their first publicized gig at SXSW in Austin, Texas on March 20, 2009, and their debut album was released on April 21, 2009. Adam Schlesinger died in 2020 from COVID-19. A few months after Schlesinger's death, Hanson revealed that a Tinted Windows reunion had been in the works.

== Personal life ==
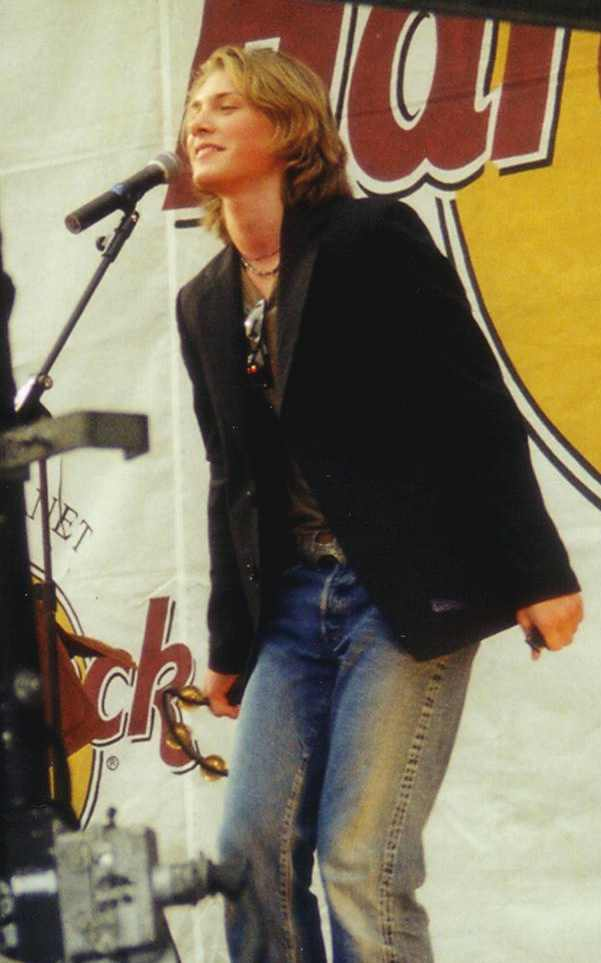
Hanson in concert in Madrid, 2000

On June 8, 2002, Hanson married Natalie Anne Bryant, whom he met in 2000. They have seven children; sons born in 2002, 2006, 2008 and 2018 and daughters in 2005, 2012 and 2020.

In 2014, Taylor Hanson founded Food on the Move, a Tulsa-based volunteer organization that fights food insecurity in the community. It offers fresh produce, prepared meals, and access to local resources and health services.

In 2021, as part of The Sound of Black Wall Street musical project, Taylor Hanson contributed to an album commemorating the hundredth anniversary of the Tulsa race massacre. His non-Hanson solo song "Sound Like Joy" was recorded at historic Vernon AME Church in the heart of Tulsa's Black Wall Street.

In November 2025, Taylor was inducted into the Oklahoma Hall of Fame.

== Discography ==
=== with Tinted Windows ===
- Tinted Windows (2009)

=== Solo ===
- "Sound Like Joy" — The Black Wall Street Music Project Album with Various Artists (2022)
- "You Rise" (with Majeste Pearson) (2026)
- "Criminal" (2026)

=== Guest Appearances ===
- "Material Girl" - Awolnation (My Echo, My Shadow, My Covers, and Me) (2022)
- "On The Way Down - 20th Anniversary" - Ryan Cabrera, AJ McLean, Joey Fatone, Drake Bell, Walk the Moon, and Nash Overstreet (Non-album single) (2025)
- "Burnout" - Scary Kids Scaring Kids and Lacey Sturm (Maps Written in Water) (2025)
- "All Night, Alright" - Cory Wong (Lost In The Wonder) (2026)
