= Middle of Everywhere: The Greatest Hits =

Greatest hits album by Hanson
- Released: September 8, 2017
- Recorded: 1996–2017
- Genre: Pop
- Length: 103:00
- Label: 3CG

Hanson chronology
Loud / Play (2016)	Middle of Everywhere: The Greatest Hits (2017)	Finally It's Christmas (2017)

Singles from Middle of Everywhere: The Greatest Hits
- 1. "I Was Born" Released: May 26, 2017

Middle of Everywhere: The Greatest Hits is the first comprehensive compilation album by American pop rock group Hanson, incorporating songs from their six major studio albums, in addition to the new single "I Was Born". The album was a celebration of the band's 25th anniversary of becoming a band and the 20th anniversary of their first major label album, Middle of Nowhere. It was released on September 8, 2017.

In March 2017, Hanson announced the Middle of Everywhere 25th Anniversary World Tour, which began on June 1, 2017 and had sold out shows throughout the United States, Canada, Australia, Europe and Latin America.

== Track listing ==
1. "I Was Born" – 3:36
2. "MMMBop" – 4:28
3. "Where's the Love" – 4:13
4. "I Will Come to You" – 4:09
5. "Weird" – 4:13
6. "A Minute Without You" – 3:55
7. "This Time Around" – 4:17
8. "If Only" – 4:30
9. "Save Me" – 3:40
10. "A Song to Sing" (live) – 4:12
11. "Penny & Me" – 4:03
12. "Lost Without Each Other" – 3:45
13. "Underneath" – 4:40
14. "Strong Enough to Break" – 3:31
15. "Broken Angel" – 4:43
16. "Great Divide" – 3:59
17. "Been There Before" – 3:32
18. "Georgia" – 3:48
19. "Go" – 4:04
20. "Watch Over Me" – 4:54
21. "Thinking 'bout Somethin'" – 3:45
22. "Give a Little" – 3:32
23. "Juliet" – 3:11
24. "Get the Girl Back" – 3:46
25. "Fired Up" – 3:31
26. "Already Home" – 3:59
