= Anthem World Tour =

2013–14 concert tour by Hanson

- Tour by Hanson
- Promotional poster for the tour
- Associated album: Anthem
- Start date: July 18, 2013
- End date: August 17, 2014
- Legs: 4
- No. of shows: 3 in South America; 54 in North America; 11 in Europe; 9 in Australasia; 77 in total

Hanson concert chronology
- Shout It Out World Tour (2011–12); Anthem World Tour (2013–14); Roots & Rock 'N' Roll Tour (2015)

The Anthem World Tour is the twelfth concert tour by American pop-rock band, Hanson and is in support of their sixth studio album, Anthem (2013). The tour began in the summer of 2013, playing nearly 80 shows in the Americas, Europe and Australasia.

== Opening acts ==
- Paul McDonald (North America, select shows)
- David Ryan Harris (North America, select shows)
- Sion Russell Jones (United Kingdom)
- Adam Martin (Australia)
- Jamie McDell (New Zealand)

== Setlist ==
The following setlist was obtained from the concert held on July 21, 2013, at the Credicard Hall in São Paulo, Brazil. It does not represent all concerts for the duration of the tour.

1. "Fired Up"
2. "You Can't Stop Us"
3. "I've Got Soul"
4. "Where's the Love"
5. "Thinking of You"
6. "Scream and Be Free"
7. "A Minute Without You"
8. "Weird"
9. "Crazy Beautiful"
10. "Lost Without You" / "Deeper" / "Save Me from Myself" / "Juliet"
11. "Waiting for This"
12. "Already Home"
13. "Thinking 'bout Somethin'"
14. "Penny & Me"
15. "Give a Little"
16. "Get the Girl Back"
17. "MMMBop"
18. "This Time Around"
19. "Tonight"
  Encore
20. "Save Me"
21. "You Can't Stop Us Now"
22. "In the City"

== Tour dates ==
Date	City	Country	Venue
South America
July 18, 2013	Buenos Aires	Argentina	Teatro Vorterix
July 20, 2013	Rio de Janeiro	Brazil	Citibank Hall
July 21, 2013	São Paulo	Brazil	Credicard Hall
North America
August 26, 2013^{[A]}	Falcon Heights	United States	Leinie Lodge Bandshell
August 27, 2013^{[A]}	Falcon Heights	United States	Leinie Lodge Bandshell
August 28, 2013^{[B]}	Des Moines	United States	Simon Estes Riverfront Amphitheater
August 29, 2013	Fort Wayne	United States	Duty's Buckets Sports Pub
August 31, 2013	Boston	United States	House of Blues
September 1, 2013	Huntington	United States	Paramount Theatre
September 2, 2013	Bethlehem	United States	Sands Bethlehem Event Center
September 4, 2013	Richmond	United States	National Theater
September 6, 2013^{[C]}	London	Canada	Western Fair Music Stage
September 8, 2013	Atlanta	United States	Variety Playhouse
September 9, 2013	Birmingham	United States	WorkPlay Theatre
September 10, 2013	Nashville	United States	Wildhorse Saloon
September 11, 2013	Memphis	United States	Minglewood Hall
September 12, 2013	New Orleans	United States	House of Blues
September 15, 2013	Austin	United States	Antone's Nightclub
September 16, 2013	Dallas	United States	House of Blues
September 17, 2013	Albuquerque	United States	KiMo Theater
September 18, 2013	Denver	United States	Bluebird Theater
September 20, 2013	Salt Lake City	United States	The Depot
September 21, 2013	Las Vegas	United States	Fremont Country Club
September 22, 2013	Tucson	United States	Rialto Theatre
September 24, 2013	San Diego	United States	House of Blues
September 25, 2013	Anaheim	United States	House of Blues
September 26, 2013	West Hollywood	United States	House of Blues
September 28, 2013	Portland	United States	Aladdin Theater
September 30, 2013	Seattle	United States	Nuemos
October 2, 2013	Vancouver	Canada	Vogue Theatre
October 4, 2013	Regina	Canada	Casino Regina Show Lounge
October 5, 2013	Calgary	Canada	Chrome Showroom
October 7, 2013	Sherwood Park	Canada	Festival Place
October 8, 2013	Saskatoon	Canada	Odeon Events Centre
October 9, 2013	Winnipeg	Canada	Mainstage
October 10, 2013	Winnipeg	Canada	Mainstage
October 12, 2013	Milwaukee	United States	Pabst Theater
October 13, 2013	Chicago	United States	House of Blues
October 14, 2013	Chicago	United States	House of Blues
October 15, 2013	Lawrence	United States	Granada Theater
October 17, 2013	St. Louis	United States	The Pageant
October 18, 2013	Cincinnati	United States	Bogart's
October 19, 2013	Cleveland	United States	House of Blues
October 20, 2013	Pontiac	United States	The Crofoot
November 4, 2013^{[D]}	Bay Lake	United States	America Gardens Theatre
November 5, 2013^{[D]}	Bay Lake	United States	America Gardens Theatre
November 7, 2013	Philadelphia	United States	Theatre of Living Arts
November 8, 2013	Munhall	United States	Carnegie Library Music Hall
November 9, 2013	Toronto	Canada	Danforth Music Hall
November 10, 2013	Montreal	Canada	Virgin Mobile Corona Theatre
November 12, 2013	Fredericton	Canada	The Playhouse
November 14, 2013	Halifax	Canada	Schooner Showroom
November 15, 2013	Halifax	Canada	Schooner Showroom
November 16, 2013	Summerside	Canada	Harbourfront Theatre
November 17, 2013	Moncton	Canada	The Centre at Casino New Brunswick
November 19, 2013	Sayreville	United States	Starland Ballroom
November 20, 2013	Charlotte	United States	Amos' Southend
Europe
December 3, 2013	Glasgow	Scotland	O_{2} ABC
December 5, 2013	Manchester	England	The Ritz
December 6, 2013	Cardiff	Wales	Solus
December 7, 2013	Birmingham	England	HMV Institute
December 8, 2013	London	England	indigO_{2}
December 10, 2013	Tilburg	Netherlands	013
December 11, 2013	Cologne	Germany	Luxor
December 13, 2013	Paris	France	Le Trabendo
December 14, 2013	Solothurn	Switzerland	Kulturfabrik Kofmehl
December 16, 2013	Rome	Italy	Atlantico
December 17, 2013	Milan	Italy	Magazzini Generali
Australasia
August 5, 2014	Brisbane	Australia	The Tivoli
August 6, 2014	Gold Coast	Australia	Coolangatta Hotel Bandroom
August 8, 2014	Sydney	Australia	Enmore Theatre
August 9, 2014	Melbourne	Australia	Palais Theatre
August 10, 2014	Melbourne	Australia	Hi-Fi Bar & Ballroom
August 12, 2014	Adelaide	Australia	HQ Complex
August 13, 2014	Sydney	Australia	Hi-Fi Bar & Ballroom
August 15, 2014	Fremantle	Australia	Metropolis
August 17, 2014	Auckland	New Zealand	Powerstation

Festivals and other miscellaneous performances
^{A} This concert was a part of the "Minnesota State Fair"
^{B} This concert was a part of "Nitefall on the River"
^{C} This concert was a part of the "Western Fair"
^{D} This concert was a part of the "Eat to the Beat Concert Series"

=== Box office score date ===
Venue	City	Tickets sold / available	Gross revenue
Citibank Hall	Rio de Janeiro	1,191 / 2,825 (42%)	$82,095
Credicard Hall	São Paulo	2,341 / 3,885 (60%)	$159,788
The Crofoot	Pontiac	1,100 / 1,100 (100%)	$34,200
Virgin Mobile Corona Theatre	Montreal	549 / 549 (100%)	$16,379
The Tivoli	Brisbane	1,321 / 1,400 (94%)	$77,845
Coolangatta Hotel Bandroom	Gold Coast	559 / 900 (62%)	$32,532
Enmore Theatre	Sydney	2,437 / 2,500 (97%)	$143,148
Palais Theatre	Melbourne	2,787 / 2,800 (100%)	$166,032
Hi-Fi Bar & Ballroom	Melbourne	881 / 900 (98%)	$52,447
HQ Complex	Adelaide	1,040 / 1,100 (95%)	$60,796
Hi-Fi Bar & Ballroom	Sydney	590 / 900 (66%)	$30,168
Metropolis	Fremantle	1,069 / 1,100 (97%)	$63,707
Powerstation	Auckland	1,025 / 1,100 (93%)	$60,384
TOTAL		16,890 / 21,059 (80%)	$979,521
