= Middle of Everywhere: 25th Anniversary Tour =

2017 concert tour by Hanson

- Tour by Hanson
- Promotional poster for the tour
- Start date: June 1, 2017
- End date: October 27, 2017
- Legs: 4
- No. of shows: 9 in Europe; 9 in Australasia; 36 in North America; 7 in South America; 61 in total

Hanson concert chronology
- Roots & Rock 'N' Roll Tour (2015); Middle of Everywhere: 25th Anniversary Tour (2017); Finally, It's Christmas Tour (2017)

The Middle of Everywhere: 25th Anniversary Tour (also known as the Middle of Everywhere Tour) is the fourteenth concert tour by American band Hanson. The tour is a celebration to mark when the band formed in 1992. Beginning June 2017, the tour visited Europe, Australasia and the Americas.

== Background ==
The tour was first mentioned in 2016 while the band was creating their eleventh EP, Play. Taylor Hanson stated their plans were to release the EP and to begin a worldwide tour in 2017. The tour was officially announced in March 2017. The band went on a media junket to promote the tour and to discuss the milestones: the 25th anniversary of the band's formation and the 20th anniversary of their debut studio album. While on tour, Taylor plans to host and deejay at an after party, "Dance Like You Don’t Care", featuring a mix of modern and 90's music.

The band also announced plans to release a greatest hits album, Middle Of Everywhere—The Greatest Hits, late in 2017.

Alongside promoting the tour, the band also announced they would headlined the "Hop Jam Beer and Music Festival" in Tulsa, Oklahoma. The band are co-creators of the music festival but this year marks the first time they have headlined the event. Following their performance, the band released the single, "I Was Born".

The band also announced appearances at the 2017 edition of Summerfest and the Eat to the Beat Concert Series.

== Opening act ==
- Lewis Watson (Europe)

== Setlist ==
The following setlist was obtained from the concert held on June 5, 2017; at La Cigale in Paris, France. It does not represent all concerts during the tour.

1. "Already Home"
2. "Waiting for This"
3. "Where's the Love"
4. "Look at You"
5. "Tragic Symphony"
6. "Thinking 'bout Somethin'"
7. "Been There Before"
8. "This Time Around"
9. "Weird"
10. "Go"
11. "Madeline"
12. "Juliet"
13. "Strong Enough to Break"
14. "Penny & Me"
15. "Watch Over Me"
16. "With You in Your Dreams"
17. "On and On"
18. "I Was Born"
19. "A Minute Without You"
20. "Get the Girl Back"
21. "I'm a Man" / "Gimme Some Lovin'" / "Long Train Runnin'"
22. "MMMBop"
23. "If Only"
24. "Fired Up"
25. "In the City"
  Encore
26. "Rockin' Robin" / "Johnny B. Goode"
27. "Lost Without Each Other"

== Tour dates ==
Date	City	Country	Venue
Europe
June 1, 2017	Cologne	Germany	Gloria-Theater
June 2, 2017	Amsterdam	Netherlands	Paradiso
June 3, 2017	Hamburg	Germany	Mojo Club
June 5, 2017	Paris	France	La Cigale
June 6, 2017	Zürich	Switzerland	Komplex 457
June 7, 2017	Milan	Italy	Fabrique
June 9, 2017	Antwerp	Belgium	Muziekcentrum Trix
June 10, 2017	London	England	O_{2} Shepherd's Bush Empire
June 11, 2017	London	England	O_{2} Shepherd's Bush Empire
Australasia
June 15, 2017	Perth	Australia	Metro City Concert Club
June 16, 2017	Adelaide	Australia	Thebarton Theatre
June 18, 2017	Melbourne	Australia	Forum Theatre
June 19, 2017	Melbourne	Australia	Forum Theatre
June 21, 2017	Sydney	Australia	Enmore Theatre
June 22, 2017	Sydney	Australia	Enmore Theatre
June 24, 2017	Gold Coast	Australia	Star Theatre
June 25, 2017	Brisbane	Australia	The Tivoli
June 27, 2017	Auckland	New Zealand	Auckland Town Hall
North America
August 13, 2017	Monterrey	Mexico	Auditorio Río 70
August 15, 2017	Guadalajara	Mexico	C3 Stage
August 16, 2017	Mexico City	Mexico	El Plaza Condesa
South America
August 18, 2017	Lima	Peru	Barranco Arena
August 19, 2017	Santiago	Chile	Club Subterráneo
August 22, 2017	Buenos Aires	Argentina	Teatro Opera Allianz
August 24, 2017	Rio de Janeiro	Brazil	KM de Vantagens Hall
August 25, 2017	Belo Horizonte	Brazil	Arena KM
August 26, 2017	São Paulo	Brazil	Citibank Hall
August 27, 2017	Salvador	Brazil	Praça Sul
North America
September 12, 2017	Dallas	United States	House of Blues
September 13, 2017	Austin	United States	Emo's East
September 15, 2017	New Orleans	United States	Joy Theater
September 16, 2017	Nashville	United States	Wildhorse Saloon
September 17, 2017	Birmingham	United States	Iron City
September 19, 2017	St. Petersburg	United States	Jannus Live
September 20, 2017	Atlanta	United States	Buckhead Theatre
September 22, 2017	Raleigh	United States	The Ritz
September 23, 2017	Norfolk	United States	Norva Theatre
September 24, 2017	Silver Spring	United States	The Fillmore Silver Spring
September 26, 2017	Cleveland	United States	House of Blues
September 27, 2017	Munhall	United States	Carnegie Library Music Hall
September 28, 2017	Philadelphia	United States	The Fillmore Philadelphia
September 30, 2017	New York City	United States	PlayStation Theater
October 1, 2017	Boston	United States	House of Blues
October 3, 2017	Montreal	Canada	Corona Theatre
October 4, 2017	Toronto	Canada	Danforth Music Hall
October 6, 2017	Detroit	United States	Saint Andrew's Hall
October 7, 2017	Chicago	United States	House of Blues
October 8, 2017	Grand Rapids	United States	20 Monroe Live
October 10, 2017	Minneapolis	United States	First Avenue
October 11, 2017	St. Louis	United States	The Pageant
October 12, 2017	Lawrence	United States	Granada Theater
October 14, 2017	Denver	United States	Summit Music Hall
October 15, 2017	Salt Lake City	United States	The Depot
October 17, 2017	Seattle	United States	Neptune Theatre
October 18, 2017	Vancouver	Canada	Vogue Theatre
October 19, 2017	Portland	United States	Aladdin Theater
October 21, 2017	Anaheim	United States	House of Blues
October 22, 2017	Los Angeles	United States	Mayan Theater
October 24, 2017	San Diego	United States	House of Blues
October 25, 2017	Las Vegas	United States	House of Blues
October 27, 2017	Houston	United States	House of Blues

=== Box office score data ===
Venue	City	Tickets sold / Available	Gross revenue
Forum Theatre	Melbourne	3,995 / 4,000 (~100%)	$223,064
Enmore Theatre	Sydney	4,449 / 5,000 (90%)	$243,462
Teatro Opera Allianz	Buenos Aires	897 / 1,911 (47%)	$58,244
Arena KM	Belo Horizonte	1,165 / 5,180 (22%)	$59,134
Citibank Hall	São Paulo	4,746 / 5,291 (90%)	$317,658
Iron City	Birmingham	1,300 / 1,300 (100%)	$50,700
TOTAL		16,552 / 22,682 (73%)	$952,262
