= The Best of Hanson: Live & Electric =

Live & Electric

Live album by Hanson
- Released: October 11, 2005
- Recorded: June 5–6, 2005 at Palais Theatre, Melbourne, Australia
- Genre: Pop rock
- Label: 3CG/Cooking Vinyl
- Producer: Hanson

Hanson chronology
Underneath (2004)	Live & Electric (2005)	20th Century Masters – The Millennium Collection: The Best of Hanson (2006)

Professional ratings
Review scores
Source	Rating
AllMusic	3/5 stars

The Best of Hanson: Live & Electric is the second live album by Hanson, and is the first live album to be released under their independent record label 3CG Records. Live & Electric was recorded in June 2005 over two nights at the Palais Theatre, Melbourne, Australia and was released on October 11, 2005.

== Track listing ==
=== Disc 1 (CD) ===
1. "Optimistic" – 5:44 (Radiohead cover)
2. "Every Word I Say" – 4:41
3. "Where's the Love?" – 4:40
4. "Look at You" – 5:57
5. "Strong Enough to Break" – 4:05
6. "I Will Come to You" – 3:32
7. "Underneath" – 4:47
8. "Hand in Hand" – 6:24
9. "In a Little While" – 4:43 (U2 cover)
10. "Penny & Me" – 3:52
11. "MMMBop" – 3:50
12. "This Time Around" – 4:02
13. "Rock 'n' Roll Razorblade" – 5:01
14. "If Only" – 4:37
15. "Song to Sing" – 4:26

=== Disc 2 (DVD) ===
1. "Penny & Me" (music video)
2. "Lost Without Each Other" (music video)
3. "Underneath" (music video)
4. "Underneath" (director's cut)
5. "Crazy Beautiful"
6. "Being Me"
7. "Strong Enough to Break" (documentary trailer)

== Charts ==
United States

- Billboard Top 200 Albums – No. 182
- Billboard Independent Albums – No. 15
