= Strong Enough to Break =

- film poster
- Directed by: Ashley Greyson
- Produced by: Ashley Greyson; Isaac Hanson; Taylor Hanson; Zac Hanson
- Starring: Isaac Hanson; Taylor Hanson; Zac Hanson
- Edited by: John Russell
- Music by: Isaac Hanson; Taylor Hanson; Zac Hanson; John Russell
- Distributed by: 3CG Records
- Release date: October 2006 (Hollywood Film Festival)
- Running time: 90 minutes
- Language: English

Strong Enough to Break is a documentary film directed and written by Ashley Greyson. It follows Hanson, an American pop band from Tulsa, Oklahoma, formed in 1992 by three brothers: Taylor Hanson, Zac Hanson, and Isaac Hanson. The documentary covers the band's 40-month struggle to record and release their third studio album Underneath, and the creation of their independent record label, 3CG Records.

The group formed 3CG, an acronym for "3 Car Garage", in October 2003 and released their album Underneath in 2004 through the 3CG Records label. The documentary of this effort was shown at college campuses around the United States during the band's 2005 tour and the 10th Annual Hollywood Film Festival in 2006. The documentary was nominated for Best Documentary. The Strong Enough to Break DVD/CD was later issued via their official store.

== Plot ==
Strong Enough to Break follows Grammy-nominated music group Hanson and their three-year struggle with their record label, Island/Def Jam. In the aftermath of corporate mergers, deregulated radio, and an uncertain future, the band is faced with the challenge of making a new album while dealing with an endless array of obstacles in the music industry.

== Cast ==
- Isaac Hanson as himself.
- Taylor Hanson as himself.
- Zac Hanson as himself, the narrator.
- Stephan Jenkins as himself.
- Carole King as herself.
- Danny Kortchmar as himself.
- Allen Kovac as himself.
- Matthew Sweet as himself.
- Greg Wells as himself.
- Jeff Fenster as himself.
- Christopher Sabec as himself.
- Glen Ballard as himself.
- Lyor Cohen as himself.

== Home media release ==
- Over 60 minutes of deleted scenes and interviews.
- 5 unreleased songs.
- Demos from the recording of "Underneath."
- Never before seen interviews.

== Music ==
Track list of songs featured in the film. All lyrics and music written by Isaac Hanson, Taylor Hanson, and Zac Hanson except where noted.

No.	Title	Writer(s)	Length
1.	"Dancing in the Wind"
2.	"Crazy Beautiful"
3.	"Underneath"	Isaac Hanson, Taylor Hanson, Zac Hanson, Matthew Sweet
4.	"I Almost Care"	Isaac Hanson, Taylor Hanson, Zac Hanson, Matthew Sweet
5.	"Wake Up"
6.	"Dream Girl"
7.	"Breaktown"	Taylor Hanson, Mark Addison, Jez Ashurst
8.	"Someone"	Isaac Hanson, Taylor Hanson, Zac Hanson, Damon Lee, Dominique Grimaldi, Emma Daumas
9.	"Let You Go"	Isaac Hanson, Zac Hanson, Carole King, Jez Ashurst
10.	"Hey"	Isaac Hanson, Taylor Hanson, Zac Hanson, Greg Wells
11.	"My Own Sweet Time"	Isaac Hanson, Taylor Hanson, Zac Hanson, Glen Ballard
12.	"Out of My Head"	Isaac Hanson, Taylor Hanson, Zac Hanson, Stephen Lironi
13.	"Penny & Me"
14.	"Love Somebody to Know"	Isaac Hanson, Taylor Hanson, Zac Hanson, Stephen Lironi
15.	"Teach Your Children" (Crosby, Stills, Nash & Young cover)	Graham Nash
16.	"Strong Enough to Break"	Isaac Hanson, Taylor Hanson, Zac Hanson, Greg Wells

== Original Score ==
The original score for Strong Enough to Break was composed by John Russell (from the band Admiral Twin), and has been released on various streaming platforms (Spotify, Apple, YouTube, etc.).
