= This Time Around Tour =

2000 concert tour by Hanson

- Tour by Hanson
- Associated album: This Time Around
- Start date: July 27, 2000
- End date: November 17, 2000
- Legs: 2
- No. of shows: 8 in South America; 48 in North America; 56 in total

Hanson concert chronology
- Albertane Tour (1998); This Time Around Tour (2000); Underneath Acoustic Tour (2004)

The This Time Around Tour was a tour by American band Hanson. The tour supported the band's second studio album, This Time Around (2000). The tour predominantly visited North America with additional dates in Chile, Argentina, and Brazil. The concert film At the Fillmore was released following the tour.

== Opening act ==
- Neve
- M2M
- Michelle Branch
- John Popper

== Setlist ==
The following setlist was obtained from the September 11, 2000 concert, held at the Hammerstein Ballroom in New York City. It includes music primarily from albums Middle of Nowhere and This Time Around, in addition to various covers. This does not represent all concerts for the duration of the tour.

1. "Look at You"
2. "Crosstown Traffic"
3. "Where's the Love"
4. "Runaway Run"
5. "Wish That I Was There"
6. "Save Me"
7. "Can't Stop"
8. "Thinking of You"
9. "Piece of My Heart"
10. "Lucy" (acoustic)
11. "A Song to Sing" (acoustic)
12. "Sure About It" (acoustic)
13. "Love Song" (acoustic)
14. "You Can't Always Get What You Want"
15. "A Minute Without You"
16. "Dying to Be Alive"
17. "River"
18. "Man from Milwaukee"
19. "This Time Around"
20. "If Only"
21. "Speechless"
22. "Hand in Hand"
23. "You Never Know"
24. "Johnny B. Goode"
25. "MMMBop"
26. "In the City"
27. "This Time Around" (a cappella)
  Encore
28. "I Want You to Want Me"

== Tour dates ==
Date	City	Country	Venue
North America
July 27, 2000	Tulsa	United States	Tulsa Performing Arts Center
July 30, 2000	Seattle	United States	The Moore Theater
August 1, 2000	Vancouver	Canada	The Orpheum Theater
August 2, 2000	Portland	United States	The Crystal Ballroom
August 4, 2000	San Francisco	United States	The Warfield
August 8, 2000	Los Angeles	United States	The Wiltern
August 10, 2000	Phoenix	United States	The Web Theater
August 12, 2000	San Antonio	United States	Sea World Amp
August 15, 2000	Houston	United States	Aerial Theater
August 17, 2000	New Orleans	United States	House of Blues
August 19, 2000	Arlington	United States	Six Flags Over Texas
August 22, 2000	Atlanta	United States	The Tabernacle
August 24, 2000	Tampa	United States	Tampa Bay PAC
August 26, 2000	Sunrise	United States	Sunrise Musical Theater
August 29, 2000	Orlando	United States	Hard Rock Live
August 31, 2000	Charlotte	United States	Ovens Auditorium
September 2, 2000	Greensboro	United States	War Memorial Auditorium
September 3, 2000	Myrtle Beach	United States	House of Blues
September 6, 2000	Richmond	United States	The Carpenter Center
September 9, 2000	Hampton	United States	Hampton Bay Days
September 11, 2000	New York City	United States	Hammerstein Ballroom
September 13, 2000	York	United States	York Fair
September 14, 2000	Washington, D.C.	United States	The Warner Theater
September 16, 2000	Philadelphia	United States	The Tower Theater
September 18, 2000	Wilkes-Barre	United States	The FM Kirby Center
September 19, 2000	Poughkeepsie	United States	Mid-Hudson Civic Center
September 21, 2000	Boston	United States	The Orpheum Theater
September 23, 2000	Montreal	Canada	The Metropolis
September 25, 2000	Pittsburgh		AJ Palumbo Theater
September 26, 2000	Columbus		The Palace Theater
September 28, 2000	Detroit		The State Theater
September 30, 2000	Toronto	Canada	Massey Hall
October 2, 2000	Chicago	United States	Chicago Theater
October 5, 2000	Cleveland	United States	Lakewood Civic Auditorium
October 7, 2000	Indianapolis	United States	The Murat Theater
October 9, 2000	Milwaukee	United States	Riverside Theater
October 10, 2000	Fort Wayne	United States	Embassy Theater
October 12, 2000	Louisville	United States	Palace Theater
October 14, 2000	Cincinnati	United States	Taft Theater
October 15, 2000	Erie	United States	Warner Theater
October 17, 2000	Memphis	United States	Orpheum Theater
October 18, 2000	Nashville	United States	Ryman Auditorium
October 19, 2000	St. Louis	United States	The Pageant Theater
October 22, 2000	Kansas City	United States	Midland Theatre
October 23, 2000	Norman	United States	Lloyd Noble Center
October 25, 2000	Monterrey	Mexico	Auditorio Coca-Cola
October 26, 2000	Mexico City	Mexico	The Sports Palace
October 29, 2000	Phoenix	United States	Veterans Coliseum
South America
November 2, 2000	Santiago	Chile	Monumental
November 4, 2000	Buenos Aires	Argentina	Luna Park
November 5, 2000	Buenos Aires	Argentina	Luna Park
November 8, 2000	São Paulo	Brazil	Credicard Hall
November 8, 2000	São Paulo	Brazil	Credicard Hall
November 11, 2000	Porto Alegre	Brazil	Gigantinho Ginasium
November 15, 2000	Rio de Janeiro	Brazil	ATL Hall
November 17, 2000	Belo Horizonte	Brazil	Minas Centro

== Concert film ==
At the Fillmore was taped at the Fillmore music venue in San Francisco, California on June 27, 2000 before a live audience. The concert featured a set and setlist resembling the tour. It aired on DirecTv throughout the summer of 2000 and was released on DVD in April 2001.
