= Admiral Twin =

American pop rock band

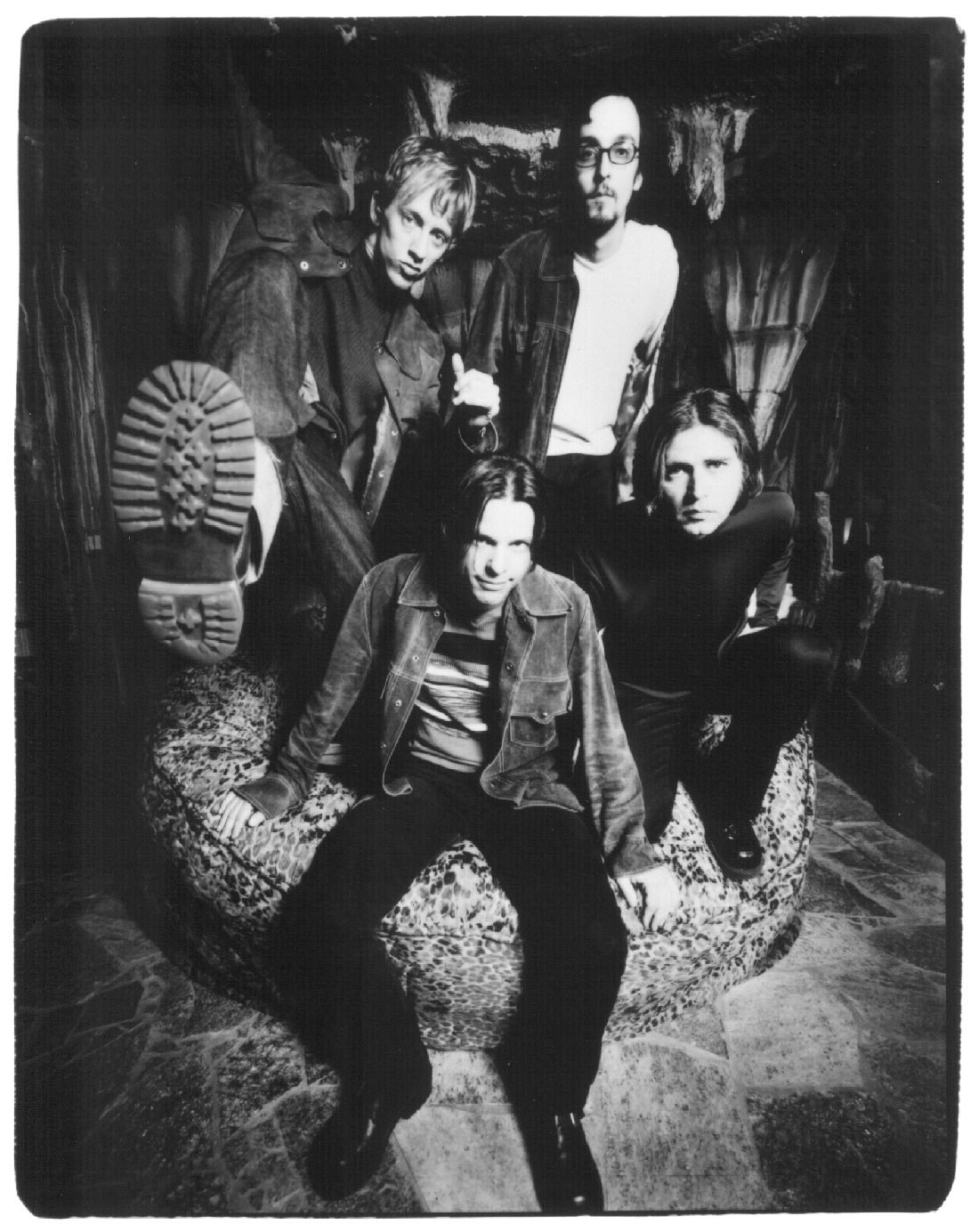
- Admiral Twin promotional photo, 2000

Background information
- Origin: Tulsa, Oklahoma
- Genres: Pop rock, power pop
- Years active: 1997 – present
- Label: New Pop Revival Records/Mojo Records
- Members: Mark Carr - vocals, bass guitar Jarrod Gollihare - vocals, drums John Russell - vocals, guitar
- Past members: Brad Becker (1997-2002) - vocals, guitar, sax
- Website: www.admiraltwin.org

Admiral Twin is an American pop rock/power pop band, formed in 1997 in Tulsa, Oklahoma. The award-winning group has toured North America extensively, and has released multiple albums internationally on various record labels like Mojo/Universal, Didgeridoo Records, Infinity Distribution, The Pop Collective, and their own independent label, New Pop Revival Records. They have also had several songs featured in radio, television, and theatrical films. Originally a quartet, they have performed and recorded as a trio as well.

Their name comes from the Admiral Twin Drive-In, a popular drive-in theater in Tulsa.

== 1996-1997 ==
Admiral Twin was formed in Tulsa, Oklahoma by members of the Mellowdramatic Wallflowers and State of Mind; two bands that had been playing the local music scene over the previous decade. At that time, the band consisted of Brad Becker (vocals, guitar, sax, accordion), Mark Carr (vocals, bass), Jarrod Gollihare (vocals, drums), and John Russell (vocals, guitar). All of the members are also songwriters. After performing some shows and recording a few demos over the course of the year, they officially began working on their first album in fall of 1996. On October 23, 1996, the band performed at the Hard Rock Cafe in Boston, MA for the NEMO Music Showcase & Conference (then part of the Boston Music Awards). On June 13, 1997, the band performed a concert with Hanson at Frontier City in Oklahoma City, OK.

== 1997–2002 ==
Admiral Twin released their debut album, Unlucky, on December 20, 1997, on the independent label, New Pop Revival Records. Produced and recorded by the band at their home studio, it was then assembled by Steve Ripley at The Church Studio before being sent off for mastering by Roger Seibel at SAE in Phoenix, AZ. Thomas Conner's review in the Tulsa World called it "One phenomenal freakin’ pop album.", and Dallas Koehn at Urban Tulsa Weekly opined that "It offers hope for the next decade of modern music.” On December 25, 1997, the band performed the Christmas classic, "Do You Hear What I Hear?" in a pre-taped segment on the TV program Good Morning Oklahoma, on KTUL in Tulsa, OK. On February 6, 1998, Admiral Twin performed at Jack's Sugar Shack in Los Angeles, CA for the Poptopia event. On May 31, 1998, the group performed a concert with The Marshall Tucker Band at Riverparks in Tulsa, OK.

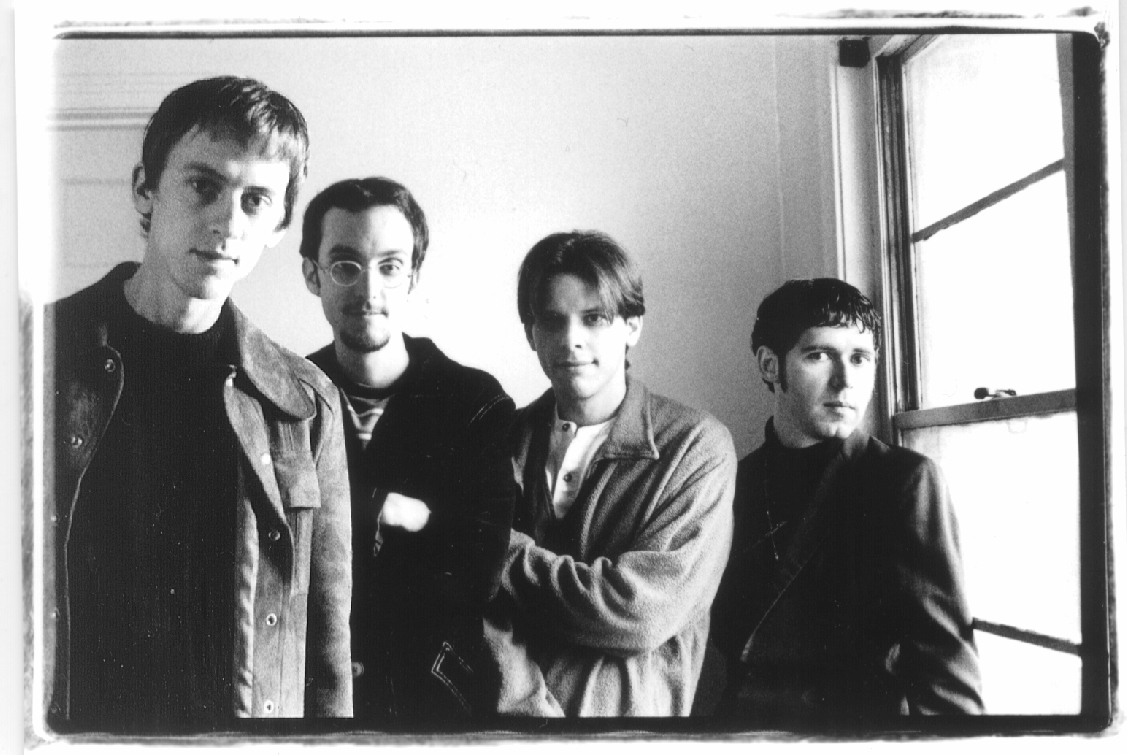
Admiral Twin promotional photo, 1997

In support of Unlucky, they toured with local Tulsa pop stars, Hanson, as the opening act on the Albertane Tour playing arenas and stadiums in the summer of 1998. The tour included cities throughout the United States and Canada, including performances at the Hollywood Bowl and Red Rocks Amphitheatre. A few dates included Baha Men on the bill. On December 4, 1998, the band performed with Fastball, Everlast, and Reel Big Fish at the KMYZ-FM Not Necessarily Acoustic Christmas concert at the Tulsa Theater, which was taped, and then later broadcast on radio.

They signed with Mojo Records, then a subsidiary of MCA/Universal in the fall of 1998, going into the studio to record Mock Heroic, produced by Gavin MacKillop, which was released nationwide on June 20, 2000. Principal recording of the album was done at The Church Studio in Tulsa, OK, with a few final overdubs at Master Control Studios in Burbank, CA. Final mixing was completed by Gavin MacKillop at The Record Plant in Los Angeles, CA, with album mastering by Joe Gastwirt at Oceanview. Two singles were released to radio, "The Unlucky Ones" and "Better Than Nothing At All", including a music video directed by Ashley Greyson for the latter. The song "Another Day" made a subtle appearance in a theatrically released Warner Bros movie, The In Crowd. In his review of the album, Par Winberg of Melodic (magazine) called it "“Superb modern rock with touches of Midwest rock and power pop." CMJ Magazine wrote "Sharp, effervescent pop tunes", with Alex Steininger of In Music We Trust summing it up as "A groove-filled, fun-time pop album". Despite reviews, Mock Heroic and its single releases suffered from little or no promotion, and financial support for a planned follow-up arena/stadium tour with Hanson was denied by the label. Unfortunately, the fate of Mojo Records was shaky at this time, and after a period of uncertainty, the Mojo label was dropped from Universal. This left Admiral Twin to become independent artists once again on the New Pop Revival label.

On May 15, 1999, the band performed a concert with Joan Jett & The Blackhearts at Mayfest in Tulsa. On November 12, 1999, the band performed along with The Tractors, Dwight Twilley, and Wayman Tisdale at Cain's Ballroom, for the inaugural Tulsa World Spot Music Awards. On May 17, 2000, the band performed with Big Bad Voodoo Daddy at the House of Blues in Los Angeles, CA, for a taping of the television show Blind Date. On July 20, 2000, the band performed with The Nixons at Club Millennium in Tulsa, OK. August 22, 2000 the band performed with Caroline's Spine at the ID Club in Tulsa, OK. On June 9, 2001, the band performed with Hanson at Riverfest in Tulsa, OK. On July 24, 2001, the band performed for the International Pop Overthrow event at the former Knitting Factory in Los Angeles, CA.

The band released a Christmas EP in 2001.

In 2002 the band released their third album, Odds and Ends, a collection of demos and rarities from 1996 to 2000. From that album, the song "Slowdown" got some rotation on the radio station KMRX 101.5, which was a station in Tulsa, OK at that time. In the Tulsa World review of the album, Thomas Conner called it "One of the most satisfying Admiral Twin records ever." The Phantom Tollbooth's Chris Macintosh said the album was "full of excellent and intelligent pop songs that stay with you long after the original listen." Also in 2002, the band recorded backing vocals for a couple of tracks featured on Ripley, the solo album by The Tractors frontman Steve Ripley. On August 1, 2002, the band performed for the International Pop Overthrow event at The Joint in Los Angeles, CA.

In August 2002 Brad Becker left Tulsa and the band to pursue a career in an unrelated field.

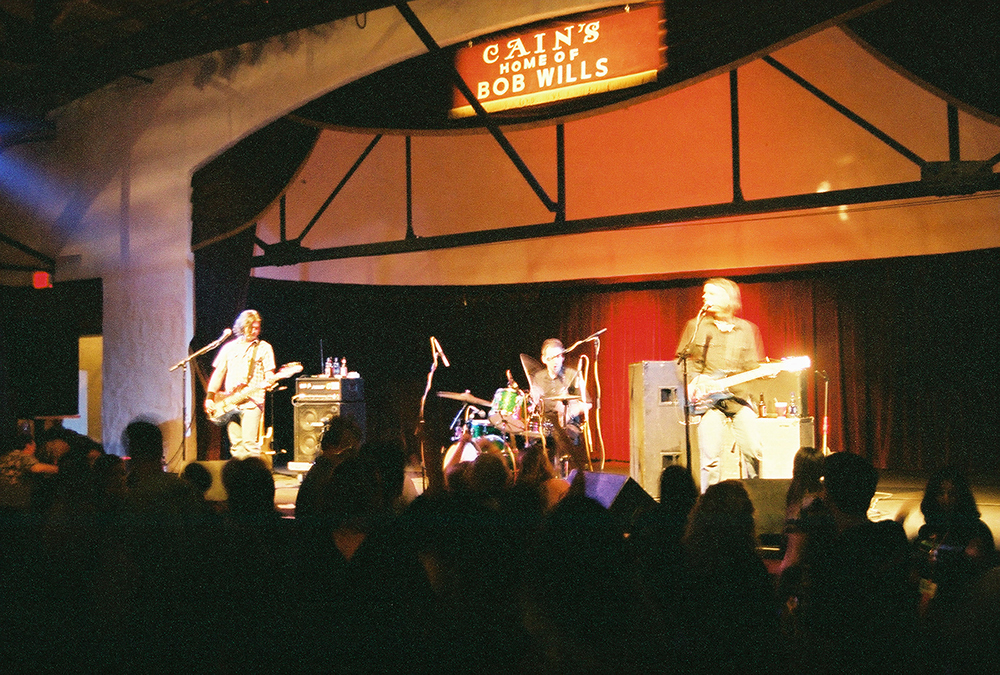
Admiral Twin performing at Cain's Ballroom, 2004

== 2002–2007 ==
Admiral Twin, now a trio, continued working on material for their fourth album. On December 8, 2002, the band performed at the famed music venue Arlene's Grocery in New York City for the International Pop Overthrow. Their fourth album, Creatures of Bread & Wine was released May 13, 2003. They also released music videos for "Dreamer", "That's All Right" and "I'm Talking 'Bout Me". The album was produced and recorded by the band, with mastering by Joe Gastwirt at Oceanview in Los Angeles, CA. In Bruce Brodeen of Not Lame Recordings review, he called it "A spirited blast of freshly honed pop that is witty and multi-faceted." Joseph Felzke with Urban Tulsa Weekly wrote "These are some of Admiral Twin’s best songs, with a guitar sound and rhythmic power that’s very satisfying." During the Creatures of Bread & Wine recording sessions, they also recorded their own rendition of the theme to the popular Cartoon Network TV series Sealab 2021.

In December 2003 the band released a second Christmas EP and a music video for "We Three Kings".

A year later, Creatures of Bread & Wine was released in Australia on the Didgeridoo Records label. It was also re-released nationwide in the United States by Infinity Distribution.

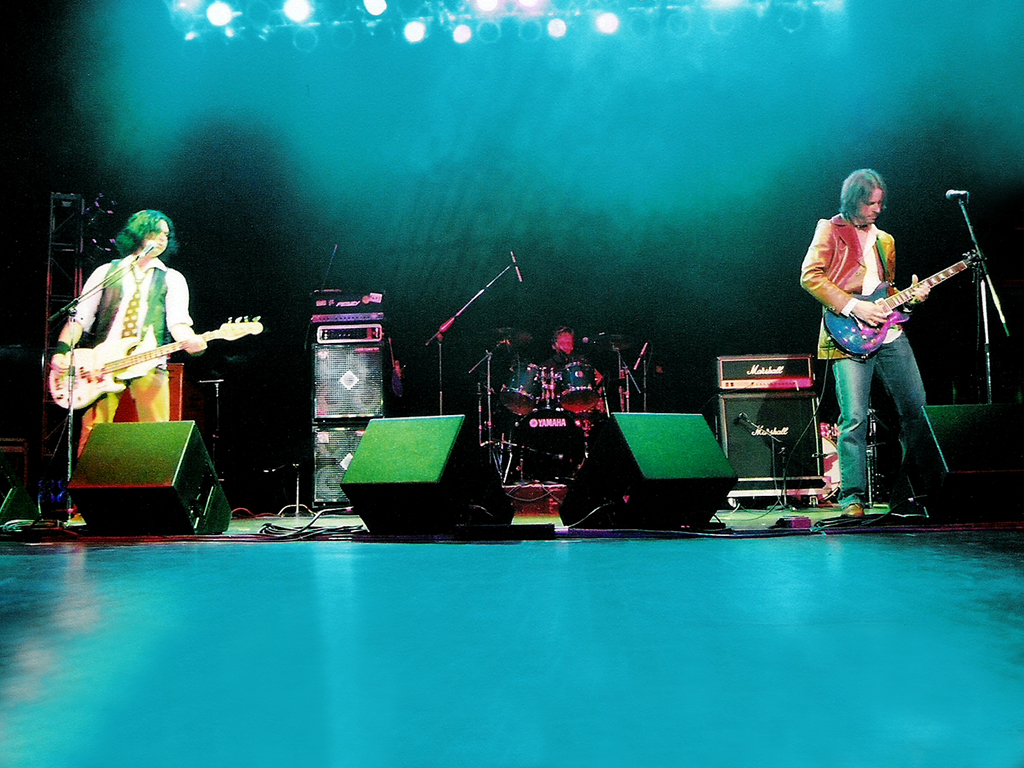
Admiral Twin performing at the Tulsa World Spot Music Awards, 2003

Admiral Twin has won multiple Spot Music Awards, including 5 as Best Pop Act of the year, from the Tulsa World's annual recognition of Tulsa area musicians, voted on by the public.

In 2004, they had a song featured in the TV series Rides on the TLC Network.

On April 3, 2005, Admiral Twin performed at the International Pop Overthrow in Chicago, Il. On May 20, 2005, they performed with Hanson, Leon Russell, and Steve Ripley at MayFest in Tulsa, OK.

In early 2007 Admiral twin signed with the North Carolina-based record label, The Pop Collective to release their 5th album.

Admiral Twin released their fifth album, The Center of the Universe, on October 16, 2007. The album was produced and recorded by the band in their downtown Tulsa recording studio, with mastering by Joe Gastwirt at Oceanview in Los Angeles, CA. Music videos for the songs "Good As Gold" and "Renegade Planet" were released. One of the meanings behind the album title, The Center of the Universe, is a cultural landmark of that name consisting of an acoustic phenomenon found in downtown Tulsa, Oklahoma. In his album review, Eric Pettersson of Indie Vision Music wrote "Charming pop-rock jams with a sensible indie twang", while BabySue magazine called it "Super slick, super melodic modern pop", and Girder Music stated that "the album takes you through gem after gem of power pop confection".

On April 27, 2007, Admiral Twin performed at the International Pop Overthrow in Chicago, Il. The song "Good As Gold" was featured in an episode of the PBS TV series Roadtrip Nation.

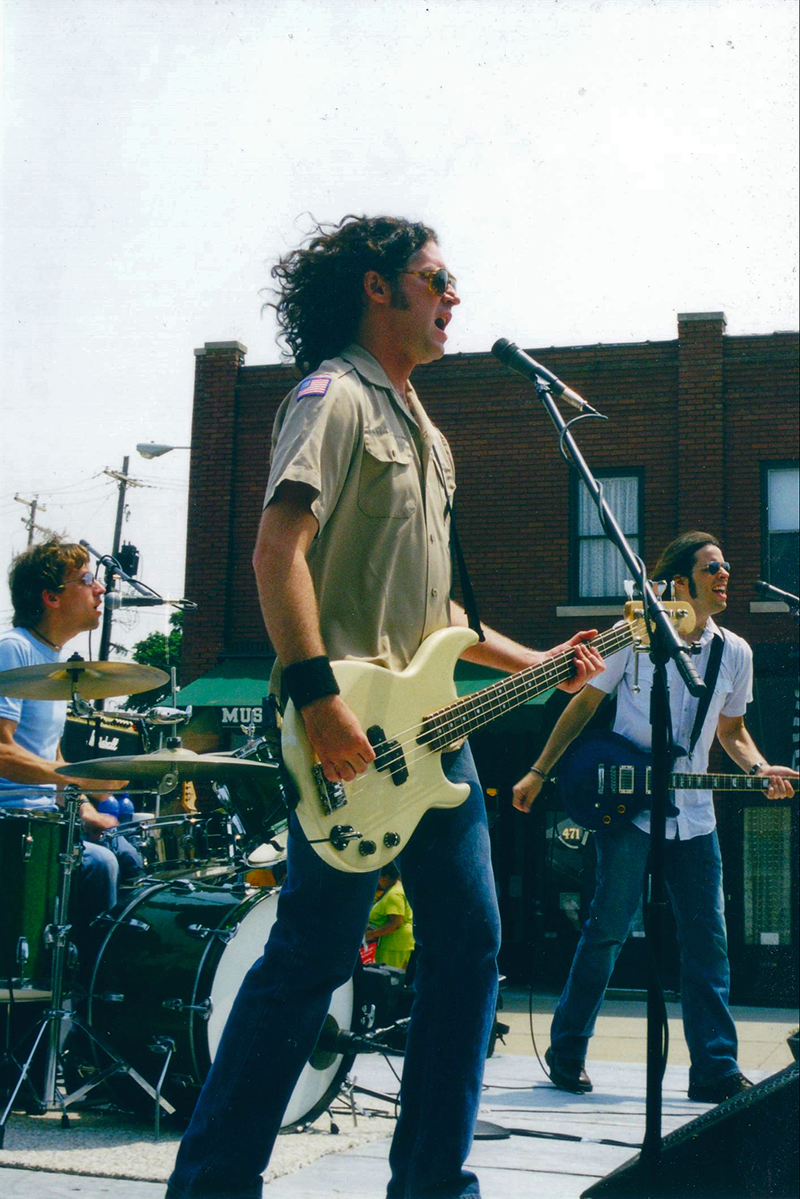
Admiral Twin performing in Muskegon, MI, 2002

== 2008–2015 ==
In 2008 the band recorded their own rendition of the theme song to the TV series Land of the Lost. Several Admiral Twin songs were featured in the 2008 film Tru Loved and the 2009 film Bitter/Sweet In 2010 the band performed and recorded songs written by Jim Edwards for the soundtrack to the film The Rock 'n' Roll Dreams of Duncan Christopher. In 2011 the band had songs featured in the film Compliance which debuted at the Sundance Film Festival.

On October 7, 2010, the band performed with Caroline's Spine at the Admiral Twin Drive-In Theater in Tulsa, OK. This was a fundraising concert to benefit the drive-in after the screen had burned down a month prior. On July 15, 2012, the band performed at the grand re-opening of the Admiral Twin Drive-In. The band continued performing and touring though fall 2012, before taking an indefinite hiatus from live performances.

In 2014 the band released the single "Black Belt Universe" to streaming platforms. The song was originally recorded during studio sessions for the 2007 album The Center of the Universe. In 2015 the song "Better Than Nothing At All" was included in an episode of the British drama series The Interceptor, broadcast on BBC One in the United Kingdom.

== 2022–2026 ==
The song "Tomorrow" was featured in the December 5th, 2022 premiere episode of the reality TV series Back In The Groove. on Hulu. In 2022 the entire track list from the album Mock Heroic was added to the Rocksmith+ music-learning game by Ubisoft. In 2024 the song "Better Than Nothing At All" was featured in an episode of the TV series Laid, and then in 2025 it was featured again in the 11th-season premiere episode of Chicago Med, broadcast in the U.S. nationwide on NBC.

After a 14-year hiatus from live performances, on March 28, 2026, Admiral Twin performed live in concert at Maggie's Music Box in Jenks, OK with Caroline's Spine.

== Discography ==
- Unlucky (1997)
- Mock Heroic (2000)
- Christmas EP (2001)
- Odds & Ends (2002)
- Creatures of Bread & Wine (2003)
- Christmas EP (2003)
- The Center of the Universe (2007)

== Group members ==
- Mark Carr – vocals, bass guitar
- Jarrod Gollihare – vocals, drums
- John Russell – vocals, guitar
- Brad Becker (1997–2002) – vocals, guitar, sax, accordion
