= String Theory (Hanson album) =

Studio album by Hanson
- Released: November 9, 2018
- Label: 3CG
- Producer: Hanson

Hanson chronology
Finally It's Christmas (2017)	String Theory (2018)	Against the World (2021)

Singles from String Theory
- 1. "Siren Call" Released: September 14, 2018

String Theory is the seventh studio album and first double album by Hanson, released on November 9, 2018, featuring the Prague Symphony performing string arrangements by composer David Campbell. The album was produced by Hanson.

== Promotion ==
Hanson promoted the album with the String Theory Tour.

== Track listing ==
Disc 1

1. "Reaching for the Sky (Pt.1)"
2. "Joyful Noise"
3. "Where's the Love"
4. "Dream It Do It"
5. "MMMBop"
6. "Chasing Down My Dreams"
7. "Tragic Symphony"
8. "Got a Hold on Me"
9. "Yearbook"
10. "Siren Call"
11. "Me Myself and I"

Disc 2

1. "Reaching for the Sky (Pt. 2)"
2. "This Time Around"
3. "Something Going Round"
4. "Battle Cry"
5. "You Can't Stop Us"
6. "Broken Angel"
7. "What Are We Fighting For"
8. "Breaktown"
9. "No Rest for the Weary"
10. "I Was Born"
11. "Sound of Light"
12. "Tonight"

== Charts ==
Chart (2018)	Peak position
Australian Digital Albums (ARIA)	19
US Independent Albums (Billboard)	8
US Top Classical Albums (Billboard)	4
