= At the Fillmore (Hanson video) =

Video by Hanson
- Released: 2001
- Recorded: 27 June 2000
- Genre: Pop rock
- Length: 60 Minutes
- Label: Universal Music
- Producer: Charley Randazzo

Hanson chronology
| The Road to Albertane (1998) | At the Fillmore (2001) | Underneath Acoustic Live (2004) |

Professional ratings
Review scores
| Source | Rating |
|---|---|
| Allmusic | 3/5 stars |

At the Fillmore, is the 2nd live DVD by American band Hanson. It was recorded on 27 June 2000 at The Fillmore Auditorium in San Francisco. The concert aired on DirecTV throughout the summer of 2000 and the DVD was released in Japan, United States and Canada in April 2001.

== Track listing ==
All songs written by Isaac Hanson, Taylor Hanson, and Zachary Hanson, except Magic Carpet Ride (Rushton Moreve, John Kay)

1. "You Never Know"
2. "Runaway Run"
3. "Thinking of You"
4. "I Wish That I Was There"
5. "Sure About It"
6. "Love Song"
7. "Hand In Hand"
8. "A Song To Sing"
9. "If Only"
10. "This Time Around"
11. "MMMBop"
12. "Magic Carpet Ride"
13. "In The City"

== Charts ==
| Chart (2001) | Peak position |
|---|---|
| US Music Video Sales (Billboard) | 18 |
