= Ashley Greyson =

American filmmaker

Ashley Greyson (sometimes credited as Ash Greyson) is a film and music video director, cinematographer, editor, and producer, who usually works with the band Hanson. He attended the USC School of Cinematic Arts.

Greyson worked with Hanson on the documentary film Strong Enough To Break, about the 3 1/2-year struggle the band went through to make a record. It documents meetings from 2000 to 2004 and the start of the band's record company, 3CG Records, along with the release and success of their album Underneath. The film was nominated for a 2006 Hollywood Film Festival award (Best Documentary).

Now living in Nashville Tennessee, has 7 children: Jax (born October 13, 2005) Catcher (born May 28, 2007) Finn (born February 1, 2009) LulaBelle (born September 13, 2010) Holiday (born November 24, 2012) Petunia (born 2014) and Rockford (born 2016).

== Selected filmography ==
- Life Happens (2010 - Director, Writer)
- Bleed Into One: The Story of Christian Rock (2010 post-production - Director, Cinematographer)
- Strong Enough to Break (2005 - Director, Producer, Cinematographer)
- The Road to Albertane (1998 - Director, Producer)
- Tulsa, Tokyo, and the Middle of Nowhere (1997 - Director, Cinematographer, Videographer, Editor)
- Live From Albertane (Videographer, Director, Editor)
- Live at the Fillmore (Videographer, Director, Editor)
- Underneath Acoustic Live (Videographer, Director, Editor)
- "Save Me" music video (Director)
- "Go" music video (Director)
- "The Great Divide" (Director)
