= Finally It's Christmas =

Studio album by Hanson
- Released: October 27, 2017
- Recorded: 2016
- Genres: Christmas; pop
- Length: 36:00
- Labels: 3CG; S-Curve; BMG
- Producers: Mark Hudson; Hanson

Hanson chronology
Middle of Everywhere: The Greatest Hits (2017)	Finally It's Christmas (2017)	String Theory (2018)

Singles from Finally It's Christmas
- 1. "Finally It's Christmas" Released: October 27, 2017

Finally It's Christmas is the second Christmas album by American pop rock group Hanson. The band wrote and produced the album with Mark Hudson, who also collaborated on the band's first Christmas release, Snowed In (1997). Several of the band's children also make appearances in some songs. The album was released on October 27, 2017.

== Background ==
Taylor Hanson on why it took so long to do another Christmas album:

This whole year has been about celebrating the band's 25th anniversary. We had debated a follow-up Christmas album for a long time for a couple reasons. One, Snowed In was actually one of our favorite albums to make. And two, it really has been something that many fans have come back to for two decades, and every year we get asked, "When are you making another Christmas album?"

== Composition ==
The album features a mix of classic Christmas covers from Elvis Presley's "Blue Christmas" to Mariah Carey's "All I Want for Christmas Is You" (renamed "All I Want for Christmas") as well as a mash up of "Joy to the World" and "Go Tell It on the Mountain" and four original songs.

== Track listing ==
1. "Finally It's Christmas" – 3:45
2. "Wonderful Christmas Time" – 3:12
3. "Rudolph the Red-Nosed Reindeer" – 0:28
4. "'Til New Year's Night" – 3:24
5. "Please Come Home" – 3:27
6. "Someday at Christmas" – 2:48
7. "Joy to the Mountain" – 2:40
8. "Jingle Bells" – 0:20
9. "Happy Christmas" – 1:37
10. "All I Want for Christmas" – 3:29
11. "Winter Wonderland" – 2:39
12. "Blue Christmas" – 2:58
13. "Peace on Earth" – 3:27
14. "Have Yourself a Merry Little Christmas" – 2:42

Track listing adapted from the iTunes Store.

== Charts ==
Chart (2017)	Peak position
Australian Albums (ARIA)	7
New Zealand Heatseeker Albums (RMNZ)	4
US Billboard 200	81
US Top Holiday Albums (Billboard)	3
