= Shout It Out (Hanson album) =

Studio album by Hanson
- Released: (United States) June 8, 2010 (Japan) July 14, 2010 (United Kingdom) June 3, 2011 (Digital Release) (United Kingdom) June 6, 2011 (Physical Release) (Philippines) March 10, 2012
- Recorded: 2009–2010
- Genre: Pop rock, soul
- Length: 49:29
- Label: 3CG (Japan) Victor (Philippines) PolyEast Records
- Producer: Hanson

Hanson chronology
Stand Up, Stand Up (2009)	Shout It Out (2010)	Anthem (2013)

Singles from Shout It Out
- 1. "Thinking 'Bout Somethin'" Released: April 20, 2010; 2. "Give a Little" Released: April 5, 2011

Shout It Out is the fifth studio album released by American pop band Hanson. The album is the third release through their own label 3CG Records. Shout It Out was released on June 8, 2010, in the US, and July 14, 2010, in Japan.

On March 6, 2010, Hanson shot dance and other sequences for the music video of their new single, "Thinking 'Bout Somethin'", at Greenwood Avenue in their hometown of Tulsa. Hanson recruited professional dancers for the shoot and also invited local residents and fans to take part. The video was directed by Todd Edwards, co-founder of Blue Yonder Films. It was released for public viewing to the band's MySpace channel on April 15, 2010.

== Background ==
In a Billboard interview, Taylor Hanson said of Shout It Out: "Every record is important, but this one feels like... a reflection not just of right now but a selection of things we've been putting in records for the last fifteen years." In the same article, Billboard said, "While the new album exudes the ease of a veteran band with over a decade of music behind them, it retains elements of the fun, pop-soul tinged sound that helped the guys hit No. 1 on the Hot 100 with "Mmmbop" when they were all under 17 years old."

== Singles ==
The first single from the album, "Thinking 'Bout Somethin'" was officially released on Monday, April 5, 2010 to AOL and was made available on iTunes Tuesday, April 20, 2010. The second single from the album was "Give a Little", released on Tuesday, April 5, 2011, and it included bonus remixes made by the band and the music video was released in February 2011. "Give a Little" would peak at #40 on the US Hot AC radio chart.

== Reception ==
Professional ratings
Aggregate scores
Source	Rating
Metacritic	(67/100)
Review scores
Source	Rating
AbsolutePunk	(78%)
Allmusic	3/5 stars
American Music Channel	4.5/5 stars
Billboard	(positive)
Entertainment Weekly	B−
Rolling Stone	3/5 stars
Slant Magazine	3/5 stars
Stereo Subversion	B

Reaction to the album has been generally favorable. At Metacritic, which assigns a normalized rating out of 100 to reviews from mainstream critics, the album received an average score of 67, based on 6 reviews, which indicates "generally favorable reviews". Slant Magazine critic Jonathan Keefe awarded the album three out of five stars and stated that Shout It Out "is the trio's most ambitious project" and that it "includes a few moments of real inspiration." Allmusic critic Stephen Thomas Erlewine also rated the album three out of five stars in a more mixed review. Erlewine remarked that, "Hanson are sharp enough to keep things tight... but the music itself is too finely honed." A review from AbsolutePunk surmises that, "Aside from the trio's penchant for maudlin and borderline campy lyrics, there's little about Shout it Out that isn't infectious". The Entertainment Weekly review praised the album, claiming: "Uptempo jams like Waiting for This shimmer with top-shelf songcraft; Motown vet Bob Babbitt even sits in on bass. But sometimes you wish these whiz kids would act their age". QRO said the album "may just be okay, but it's at the highest tier of okay. It's not a great album, but it's not trying to be either; it plays to its audience, and it does it well." Jonathan Keefe from Slant Magazine was, somewhat, favorable in his review, saying: "What's encouraging about the record, though, is that Hanson's instincts are more or less on point. The effervescent brass sections, aggressive rhythm tracks, and AM-radio vibe they've incorporated are all logical and effective additions to their aesthetic. That Hanson has been around for well over a decade now makes it easy to forget that they're still a young band. And the elements that really work on Shout It Out suggest that they're only going to continue to get better". Connor McKnight from Billboard was largely positive, writing: "Long before the first Jonas Brothers album hit the shelves, another sibling trio reigned supreme. Hanson brothers Isaac, Taylor and Zac may still be widely known for their playful 1997 pop hit, "MMMBop," but the trio's fifth studio album, "Shout It Out," shows that the group continues to expand its musical roots. A colorful set that pays tribute to the funk, soul and R&B musical influences that shapes its sound, "Shout It Out" has a sunnier vibe than the group's 2007 predecessor, "The Walk." "Shout It Out" still breaks into emotional territory with piano ballads like "Use Me Up" (featuring Zac on lead vocals), while Taylor's windy tenor shines on "Carry You There." From the profoundly upbeat single "Thinking 'Bout Something'" to the heartfelt and introspective closer "Me Myself and I," "Shout It Out" is a fun listen that beams with genuine talent and creative artistry".

== Track listing ==
All songs written and produced by Isaac Hanson, Taylor Hanson and Zac Hanson.
Lead vocals by Taylor Hanson, except where noted.

1. "Waiting for This" – 3:17
2. "Thinking 'Bout Somethin'" – 3:45
3. "Kiss Me When You Come Home" – 3:38
4. "Carry You There" – 4:33
5. "Give a Little" – 3:45
6. "Make It Out Alive" – 4:35
7. "And I Waited" (lead vocals: Zac Hanson) – 4:01
8. "Use Me Up" (lead vocals: Zac Hanson) – 4:04
9. "These Walls" – 3:58
10. "Musical Ride" (lead vocals: Zac Hanson) – 3:48
11. "Voice in the Chorus" – 4:39
12. "Me Myself and I" – 5:30

Japanese bonus track

13. "Make It Through Today" (lead vocals: Isaac Hanson) – 4:46

UK Deluxe Edition bonus tracks

13. "Give A Little" (Video) – 3:49
14. "Give A Little (RAC Mix)" (Video) – 3:39
15. "Give A Little (Questlove Mix)" (Video) – 4:14
16. "Making Of Give A Little" (Video) – 5:58
17. "Making Of Shout It Out" (Video) – 6:30

== Personnel ==
=== Band ===
- Taylor Hanson – vocals, piano, organ, keyboards, handclapping
- Isaac Hanson – vocals, guitars, bass, handclapping
- Zac Hanson – vocals, drums, percussion, piano, handclapping

=== Additional musicians ===
- William Birkhead – bass
- Bob Babbitt – bass
- Don Fornero, Gary Grant – trumpet, flugelhorn
- Dan Higgins – saxophone
- Bill Reichenbach Jr. – trombone
- Ryan Williamson – bottles
- Jerry Hey – horn arrangements

== Production ==
- Arranged and produced by Hanson
- Recorded and engineered by Craig Alvin, Steve Churchyard (engineered horns) and Ryan Williamson
- Mixed by John Goodmanson

== Chart positions ==
Shout It Out debuted at number 30 on the Billboard 200.

Chart (2010)	Peak position
UK Independent Albums (OCC)	34
U.S. Billboard 200	30
U.S. Billboard Digital Albums	15
U.S. Billboard Top Independent Albums	2
