= Vibra São Paulo =

Theatre in São Paulo, Brazil

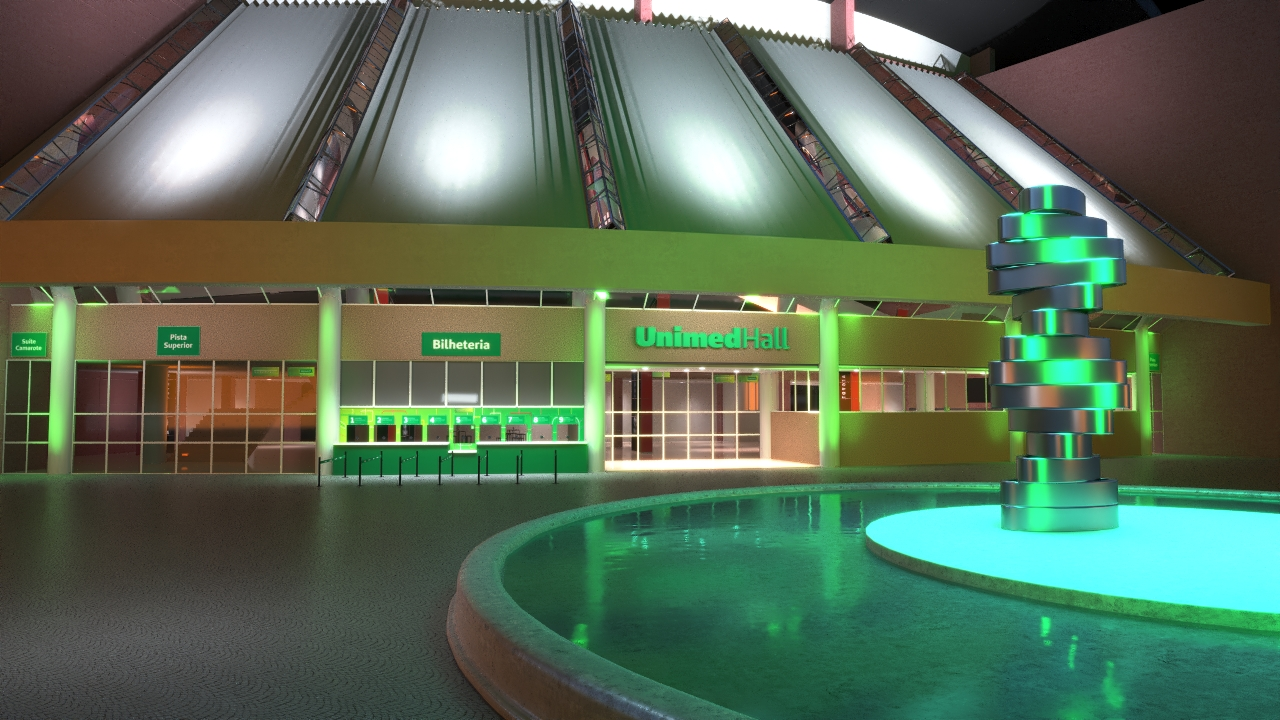
- Venue seen with Unimed signage
- Interactive map of Vibra São Paulo
- Address: Av. das Nações Unidas, 17955
- Location: São Paulo, Brazil
- Coordinates: 23°38′51″S 46°43′26″W
- Owner: Stage Empreeendimentos
- Operator: Opus Entretenimmento
- Capacity: 7,000
- Field size: 8,000 m^{2} (86,000 sq ft) (built area); 25,000 m^{2} (270,000 sq ft) (total area)
- Public transit: Santo Amaro; João Dias

Construction
- Opened: September 1999
- Years active: 1999–2021; 2022–present
- Builder: Construtora Moraes Dantas

Website
- www.vibrasaopaulo.com

Vibra São Paulo (formerly known as Credicard Hall) is a music theatre in the Santo Amaro neighbourhood, city of São Paulo, Brazil. It opened in September 1999, with capacity for 7,000 people. Considered to be one of the largest indoor entertainment venues in Brazil and one of the largest in Latin America. The 60th anniversary of Miss Universe 2011 pageant was held on September 12 that year at the hall. It used to be called Credicard Hall in most of its history, but its name changed in October 2019 due to a naming rights partner. The theatre closed on March 31, 2021. On 1 April 2022, the reopening of the venue was announced under its new name Vibra São Paulo following an agreement between the new house manager, Opus Entertenimento, and the biofuel company Vibra Energia. The venue officially reopened in May.

== Naming history ==
- Credicard Hall (January 2000 - 20 November 2013; April 2018 - October 2019)
- Citibank Hall (21 November 2013 - April 2018)
- UnimedHall (October 2019 - March 2021)
- Vibra São Paulo (April 2022 - Present)

== Performers ==
Country	Artist	Tour	Date
(United States)	Red Hot Chili Peppers	Californication Tour	8 October 1999
(Mexico)	Luis Miguel	Amarte Es Un Placer Tour	28-30 October 1999
(United Kingdom)	Blur	13 Tour	21 November 1999
(Canada)	Alanis Morissette	Junkie Tour	27-28 November 1999
(United States)	Creedence Clearwater Revisited		22-23 March 2000
(United Kingdom)	Simply Red		15 April 2000
(United Kingdom)	Motörhead	We Are Motörhead	6 May 2000
(United States)	Joe Satriani	Engines of Creation Tour	16 August 2000
(United States)	Hanson	This Time Around Tour	9-10 November 2000
(United States)	Lou Reed	Ecstasy Tour	14 November 2000
(United Kingdom)	British Rock Symphony		17-19 November 2000
(United States)	Bad Religion	The New America Tour	14 March 2001
(United States)	Dio	Magica Tour	5 April 2001
(United Kingdom)	Mark Knopfler	Sailing to Philadelphia Tour	6-8 April 2001
(United States)	Creedence Clearwater Revival		3 May 2001
(United Kingdom)	Judas Priest	Demolition Tour	6-7 September 2001
(Italy)	Laura Pausini	E ritorno da te World Tour	25-27 October 2001
(United Kingdom)	Voices of Classic Rock		3-4 November 2001
(United States)	T.S.O.L.	Sampoerna Surf Music	9 November 2001
(United States)	Agent Orange	Sampoerna Surf Music	9 November 2001
(United States)	Korn		11-12 March 2002
(United States)	Creedence Clearwater Revival		24-25 April 2002
(United Kingdom)	Echo & the Bunnymen		27 and 29 May 2002
(Finland)	Nightwish	World Tour of the Century	20 July 2002
(United States)	Concrete Blonde	Reunion Tour	7 August 2002
(Norway)	A-ha	Lifelines Tour	14-15 August 2002
(United States)	Buddy Guy	Sweet Tea Tour	21-22 September 2002
(United Kingdom)	Bryan Ferry	Frantic Tour	13 and 15 February 2003
(United Kingdom)	Status Quo	Heavy Traffic World Tour	14 February 2003
(Mexico)	Maná	Revolución de Amor Tour	22-23 March 2003
(United States)	Joe Satriani	Strange Beautiful Tour	3 April 2003
(Australia)	Silverchair	Across the Night Tour	15 May 2003
(United Kingdom)	The Pretenders	Loose Screw Tour	23 September 2003
(United Kingdom)	Simply Red		24 September 2003
(United Kingdom)	Echo & the Bunnymen		18 November 2003
(United Kingdom)	Jon Anderson		14 March 2004
(United Kingdom)	Jethro Tull		20 March 2004
(Norway)	Dimmu Borgir	Death Cult Campaign Tour	24 April 2004
(United States)	Dio	Master of the Moon Tour	28 August 2004
(United States)	LCD Soundsystem		10 September 2004
(United States)	The Calling		8 October 2004
(United States)	The Offspring		20-21 October 2004
(United States)	The Doors of the 21st Century		29 October 2004
(United States)	Joe Satriani, Steve Vai, John Petrucci	G3	4-5 December 2004
(United States)	Anthrax	The Greater of Two Evils Tour	25 February 2005
(United Kingdom)	Ian Anderson		14 April 2005
(United Kingdom)	Placebo		27 April 2005
(Italy)	Laura Pausini	Laura Pausini Live	28-29 April 2005
(United States)	The White Stripes	Get Behind Me Satan Tour	4 June 2005
(Italy)	Premiata Forneria Marconi		1 July 2005
(United Kingdom)	America		6 September 2005
(Finland)	Apocalyptica	Blackmail The Universe Tour	11 October 2005
(United States)	Megadeth	Blackmail The Universe Tour	11 October 2005
(United Kingdom)	Deep Purple	Bananas World Tour	1 and 3 November 2005
(United States)	Jeff Scott Soto		11-12 November 2005
(Brazil)	Tribuzy		11-12 November 2005
(United States)	Buddy Guy		25 November 2005
(United States)	Dream Theater	Octavarium Tour	10-11 December 2005
(Sweden)	Millencolin		9 March 2006
(United Kingdom)	Oasis	Don't Believe the Truth Tour	15 March 2006
(United Kingdom)	Foreigner		16 March 2006
(United Kingdom)	Jamiroquai		24 March 2006
(Germany)	Helloween	Keeper of the Seven Keys – The Legacy World Tour	25 March 2006
(United Kingdom)	Echo & the Bunnymen		29 April 2006
(United States)	Creedence Clearwater Revisited		10-11 May 2006
(United States)	Dio	An Evening with Dio Tour	15 July 2006
(United States)	NOFX		1 October 2006
(United States)	Joe Satriani, John Petrucci, Eric Johnson	G3	27-28 October 2006
(Germany)	Edguy	Rocket Ride World Tour	3 November 2006
(United Kingdom)	The Cult	A Return to Wild Tour	7-8 December 2006
(Canada)	Bryan Adams	Anthology Tour	6-7 March 2007
(United Kingdom)	Pet Shop Boys	Fundamental Tour	16-17 March 2007
(United Kingdom)	Asia	Reunion Tour	23 March 2007
(United Kingdom)	Placebo		27 March 2007
(United States)	Pennywise		30 March 2007
(United Kingdom)	Keane	Under the Iron Sea Tour	17-18 April 2007
(United Kingdom)	Jethro Tull	Acoustic Tull	28-29 April 2007
(United States)	Alice Cooper	Psycho Drama Tour	12 June 2007
(Germany)	Scorpions	Humanity World Tour	14 August 2007
(Germany)	Lacrimosa	Lichtjahre Tour	4 October 2007
(Sweden)	HammerFall	Threshold Tour	4 October 2007
(United Kingdom)	The Chemical Brothers	We Are the Night Tour	7 November 2007
(Brazil)	HIT Entertainment, EXIM Enterprise	Barney's Big Surprise	1-4 November 2007
(United States) (France)	Al Di Meola, Stanley Clarke, Jean-Luc Ponty	The Rite of Strings	22 November 2007
(United States)	Chris Cornell		13 December 2007
(United Kingdom)	Deep Purple	Rapture of the Deep Tour	24 February 2008
(United States)	Dream Theater	Chaos in Motion Tour	8 March 2008
(Germany)	Helloween and Gamma Ray	Hellish Rock Tour	20 April 2008
(United Kingdom)	Whitesnake	Good to be Bad Tour	9 May 2008
(United States)	Queensrÿche		16 May 2008
(Mexico)	Maná	Amar es Combatir Tour	4-5 June 2008
(United States)	Megadeth	Tour of Duty Tour	6 June 2008
(Germany)	Avantasia	The Scarecrow World Tour	22 June 2008
(United States)	Joe Satriani	Professor Satchafunkilus and the Musterion of Rock Tour	29 July 2008
(Finland)	Tarja Turunen	Storm World Tour	23 August 2008
(Germany)	Scorpions	Humanity World Tour	6 and 13 September 2008
(United Kingdom)	The Cult	Born into This Tour	8 October 2008
(United States)	Paramore	The Final Riot! Tour	23 October 2008
(United States)	Symphony X	Paradise Lost Tour	26 October 2008
(Australia)	Kylie Minogue	KylieX2008	8 November 2008
(United Kingdom)	Judas Priest	Nostradamus World Tour	15-16 November 2008
(Germany)	Edguy	Tinnitus Sanctus World Tour	15 February 2009
(United Kingdom)	Simply Red	The Greatest Hits Tour	3-4 March 2009
(United Kingdom)	Keane	Perfect Symmetry World Tour	10 March 2009
(Canada)	Simple Plan	Simple Plan	24 March 2009
(Norway)	A-ha	Foot of the Mountain Tour	25 March 2009
(United States)	B-52's		18 April 2009
(United Kingdom)	Heaven and Hell	Bible Black Tour	15-16 May 2009
(United States)	Jerry Lee Lewis		18 September 2009
(Italy)	Laura Pausini	LP World Tour	6-7 October 2009
(United Kingdom)	Pet Shop Boys	Pandemonium Tour	13 October 2009
(United States)	The Beach Boys		2 December 2009
(Republic of Ireland)	The Cranberries	Reunion Tour	29 January 2010
(Norway)	A-ha	Ending on a High Note Tour	10 March 2010
(United States)	Bigelf	Black Clouds & Silver Linings Tour	19 March 2010
(United States)	Dream Theater	Black Clouds & Silver Linings Tour	19 March 2010
(United Kingdom)	Placebo		17 April 2010
(United Kingdom)	Simply Red	Farewell Tour	20 April 2010
(United States)	Korn		21 April 2010
(United States)	Megadeth	Rust in Peace 20th Anniversary Tour	24 April 2010
(United States)	Manowar	Death to Infidels Tour	7 May 2010
(Germany)	Scorpions	Get Your Sting and Blackout World Tour	18-19 September 2010
(Greece)	Yanni	Yanni in Concert	21-22 September 2010
(United Kingdom)	Echo & the Bunnymen		11 October 2010
(Republic of Ireland)	The Cranberries	Reunion Tour	14 October 2010
(United States)	Paramore	Brand New Eyes World Tour	20 February 2011
(United States)	Avenged Sevenfold	Welcome to the Family Tour	3 April 2011
(United States)	Cypress Hill		4 April 2011
(United States)	Deftones		4 April 2011
(Sweden)	Roxette	Charm School World Tour	14 and 19 April 2011
(Finland)	Stratovarius	Elysium Tour	6 May 2011
(Germany)	Helloween	The 7 Sinners World Tour	6 May 2011
(United States)	John Fogerty		8 and 10 May 2011
(United Kingdom)	Ian Anderson		14 May 2011
(United States)	Buckcherry	Summer Tour	17 May 2011
(United States)	Mötley Crüe	Summer Tour	17 May 2011
(United States)	Alice Cooper	No More Mr. Nice Guy Tour	2 June 2011
(Canada)	Avril Lavigne	Black Star Tour	27-28 July 2011
(United Kingdom)	Erasure	Total Pop! Tour	9 August 2011
(United Kingdom)	Tears for Fears		6 and 14 October 2011
(United Kingdom)	Ringo Starr		12-13 November 2011
(Italy)	Laura Pausini	Inedito World Tour	21-23 January 2012
(Mexico)	Luis Miguel	Luis Miguel Tour	8-9 March 2012
(United States)	Creedence Clearwater Revisited		25 March 2012
(United States)	3 Doors Down	Time of My Life Tour	12 April 2012
(United States)	Demi Lovato	A Special Night with Demi Lovato	20 and 30 April 2012
(United States)	Bob Dylan	Never Ending Tour 2012	21-22 April 2012
(United Kingdom)	Grave Digger	The Bard's Night	23 April 2012
(Germany)	Blind Guardian	The Bard's Night	23 April 2012
(United Kingdom)	Duran Duran	All You Need Is Now Tour	5 May 2012
(Sweden)	Roxette	Charm School World Tour	10 May 2012
(United States)	Dream Theater	A Dramatic Turn of Events Tour	26 August 2012
(Canada)	Alanis Morissette	Guardian Angel Tour	2-3 September 2012
(Germany)	Scorpions	Final Sting Tour	20-21 September 2012
(Norway)	Morten Harket		26 September 2012
(United Kingdom)	Snow Patrol	Fallen Empires Tour	10 October 2012
(Greece)	Yanni		11, 13–14 October 2012
(United States)	Joe Satriani, John Petrucci, Steve Morse	G3	12 October 2012
(Canada)	Simple Plan	Get Your Heart On! Tour	18 October 2012
(Mexico)	Maná	Drama y Luz World Tour	26 October 2012
(United States)	Creed	Live on Tour	25 November 2012
(Finland)	Nightwish	Imaginaerum World Tour	12 December 2012
(United Kingdom)	Jamiroquai	Rock Dust Light Star Tour	7 February 2013
(United States)	Jonas Brothers	Jonas Brothers World Tour 2012/2013	10 March 2013
(United Kingdom)	Keane	Strangeland Tour	3 April 2013
(South Korea)	Super Junior	Super Show 5 World Tour	21 April 2013
(United Kingdom)	Pet Shop Boys	Electric Tour	22 May 2013
(United States)	Hanson	Anthem World Tour	21 July 2013
(United States)	The Offspring	Days Go By Tour	15 September 2013
(Argentina)	Violetta	Violetta en Vivo	26-28 October 2013
(United Kingdom)	Ringo Starr	12 All Starr Tour	29 October 2013
(Canada)	Loreena McKennitt		30-31 October 2013
(United Kingdom)	Cat Stevens	Peace Train Tour	16-17 November 2013
(United Kingdom)	Sarah Brightman	Dreamchaser World Tour	28-29 November 2013
(United States)	Steve Vai	Story of Light Tour	8 December 2013
(Italy)	Laura Pausini	The Greatest Hits World Tour	19-20 February 2014
(United Kingdom)	Placebo		14 April 2014
(United States)	Demi Lovato	The Neon Lights Tour	22, 24–25 April 2014
(Canada)	Avril Lavigne	The Avril Lavigne Tour	29-30 April 2014
(United States)	Eddie Vedder	South American Tour 2014	6-8 May 2014
(United States)	Fall Out Boy	Save Rock and Roll World Tour	21 May 2014
(United States)	Joe Satriani		1 October 2014
(United States)	R5	Live on Tour	4 October 2014
(United States)	Jason Derulo	Tattoos World Tour	13 November 2014
(United States)	Kesha	Warrior Tour	25 January 2015
(United States)	Sublime with Rome	Sublime with Rome/Cypress Hill/Pepper Tour	28 January 2015
(United Kingdom)	Brit Floyd	The Australian Pink Floyd Show	25 February 2015
(United Kingdom)	Steve Hackett	Genesis Extended 2015 World Tour	10 March 2015
(United Kingdom)	Joss Stone	Joss Stone Tour	11 March 2015
(United States)	Jason Mraz	Jason Mraz and Raining Jane	7 April 2015
(United States)	Lindsey Stirling	Lindsey Stirling 2014–2015 Tour	13 April 2015
(United States)	Backstreet Boys	In a World Like This Tour	12-14 June 2015
(United Kingdom)	America	America Live in Concert	21 June 2015
(Argentina)	Violetta	Violetta Live	27-28 June 2015
(Germany)	Tokio Hotel		28 August 2015
(United Kingdom)	Simply Red		15 March 2016
(Germany)	Scorpions	50th Anniversary World Tour	1, 3–4 September 2016
(Italy)	Laura Pausini	Simili Tour	11-12 September 2016
(United Kingdom)	Tom Jones		13 September 2016
(United Kingdom)	Whitesnake	Greatest Hits Tour	22-23 September 2016
(United Kingdom)	The Kooks		26 October 2016
(United States)	Chris Cornell	Acoustic Higher Truth World Tour	11 December 2016
(United Kingdom)	Roger Hodgson	Breakfest in America Tour	15 March 2017
(South Korea)	BTS	The Wings Tour	19-20 March 2017
(Canada)	Bryan Adams	Get Up Tour	28-30 April 2017
(Sweden)	Europe	War of Kings World Tour	28 May 2017
(Argentina)	Tini	Got Me Started Tour	15 July 2017
(United States)	Lindsey Stirling	2016–2017 Tour	25 August 2017
(United States)	Hanson	Middle of Everywhere: 25th Anniversary Tour	26 August 2017
(Argentina)	Soy Luna	Soy Luna en Concierto	30 September 2017
(Germany)	David Garrett	Explosive Live	16 November 2017
(Jamaica)	The Wailers	Tour The Wailers	7 December 2017
(United Kingdom)	Jamiroquai	Automaton Tour	18 December 2017
(United States)	Eddie Vedder		28-30 March 2018
(United Kingdom) (Brazil)	Andy Summers, Rodrigo Santos, João Barone	Call the Police	22 June 2018
(Argentina)	Soy Luna	Soy Luna en vivo	27 July 2018
(United Kingdom)	Kasabian	For Crying Out Loud Tour	30 September 2018
(Canada)	Loreena McKennitt	Lost Souls Tour	30-31 October 2018
(Brazil)	Meus Prêmios Nick	MPN 2018	7 November 2018
(United States) (United Kingdom)	Stone Temple Pilots & Bush		14 February 2019
(United States)	Information Society		6 September 2016
(Norway)	Aurora	2018–2019 tour	18 May 2019
(Republic of Ireland)	Celtic Woman	Ancient Land Tour	25-26 August 2019
(United Kingdom)	Dido		2 November 2019
(United States)	Now United	Dreams Come True Tour	20 November 2019
(Norway)	A-ha	Hunting High and Low Tour 2019 – 2022	18-19 July 2022
(Argentina)	Tini	Tini Tour 2022	8 October 2022
(United Kingdom)	Bring Me the Horizon	Post Human Latin American Tour 2022	16 December 2022
(South Korea)	NCT 127	Neo City – The Link	18-20 January 2023
(South Korea)	NCT DREAM	The Dream Show 2: In A Dream	4 July 2023
(Canada)	Simple Plan		1 March 2023
(Thailand)	BamBam	BamBam: The 1st World Tour [Area 52]	5 March 2023
(South Korea)	Taemin	Ephemeral Gaze	1 February 2025
(South Korea)	NMIXX	NMIXX CHANGE UP : MIXX LAB	28 February 2025
(United Kingdom)	Judas Priest	Shield of Pain Tour	20 April 2025
(South Korea)	Baekhyun	Reverie World Tour	14-15 June 2025
(South Korea)	Park Bo-gum	2025 FAN MEETING TOUR [BE WITH YOU]	21 September 2025

== See also ==
- KM de Vantagens Hall – a similar venue managed by Time for Fun

Events and tenants
Preceded by Mandalay Bay Events Center, Las Vegas United States	Miss Universe Venue; 2011	Succeeded by PH Live, Las Vegas United States
