= Underneath (Hanson album) =

Studio album by Hanson
- Released: April 20, 2004
- Recorded: Late 2001 – late 2003
- Studio: Rocket Carousel Studios
- Genre: Pop rock
- Length: 60:28
- Label: 3CG/Cooking Vinyl
- Producers: Greg Wells and Hanson

Hanson chronology
Underneath Acoustic (2003)	Underneath (2004)	The Best of Hanson: Live & Electric (2005)

Singles from Underneath
- 1. "Penny & Me" Released: March 24, 2004; 2. "Someone (Laissons nous une chance)" Released: February 2, 2005; 3. "Lost Without Each Other" Released: March 20, 2005; 4. "Crazy Beautiful" Released: August 30, 2005

Professional ratings
Aggregate scores
Source	Rating
Metacritic	69/100
Review scores
Source	Rating
AllMusic	4/5 stars
Billboard	(positive)
Blender	3/5 stars
Entertainment.ie	3/5 stars
Entertainment Weekly	B−
Q	2.5/5 stars
Rolling Stone	3/5 stars
The Village Voice	(favorable)
Yahoo! Music UK	8/10 stars

Underneath is the third album by American pop rock group Hanson. It was released in 2004 by 3CG Records. It is the band's first release on their own independent record label. The making of the album was the main subject in Hanson's documentary film, Strong Enough to Break, that follows the band during the recording process and the struggles they faced to release it.

== Singles ==
The lead single "Penny & Me" achieved some success, reaching number 2 on the Hot 100 Singles Sales chart and number 10 on the UK Singles Chart. The second single, "Lost Without Each Other", did not chart in most countries, only reaching number 39 on the UK Singles Chart and number 73 in Australia.

== Track listing ==
All songs written by Isaac Hanson, Taylor Hanson and Zac Hanson; additional writers in parentheses.
Lead vocals by Taylor Hanson, except where noted.

1. "Strong Enough to Break" (Greg Wells) – 3:32
2. "Dancin' in the Wind" – 4:04
3. "Penny & Me" – 4:03
4. "Underneath" (Matthew Sweet) – 4:40
5. "Misery" – 3:08 (Lead vocals: Zac Hanson)
6. "Lost Without Each Other" (Gregg Alexander) – 3:44
7. "When You're Gone" – 4:31
8. "Broken Angel" – 4:49 (Lead vocals: Zac Hanson)
9. "Deeper" – 4:10 (Lead vocals: Isaac Hanson)
10. "Get Up and Go" – 4:08
11. "Crazy Beautiful" – 4:02
12. "Hey" (Greg Wells) – 4:17
13. "Believe" – 12:17

French version bonus track

14. "Someone (Laissons nous une chance)" (featuring Emma Daumas; written by Damon Lee, Dominique Grimaldi, Emma Daumas; lead vocals: Isaac Hanson)

Australian bonus tracks (live from House of Blues, Chicago)

14. "If Only"
15. "I Will Come to You" (Barry Mann, Cynthia Weil)

Japanese bonus tracks

13. "Dream Girl"
14. "I Almost Care" (Matthew Sweet)
15. "With You in Your Dreams" (live)

Notes:

- "Hey" was featured on the sixth episode "A Birthday Witch" from the sixth season of the series Sabrina, the Teenage Witch.
- "Believe" includes the hidden tracks "Crazy Beautiful (Reprise)" and "Lulla Belle".
- The Japanese version does not include "Get Up and Go".

== Personnel ==
- Taylor Hanson – vocals, piano, keyboards, organ, production, art concept
- Isaac Hanson – vocals, acoustic guitar, electric guitar, production, mixing, Pro Tools engineer, art concept
- Zac Hanson – vocals, drums, percussion, piano, production, art concept
- Michelle Branch – guest vocals on "Deeper"
- Dave Ashton – Pro Tools engineer
- P.R. Brown – art direction, art design, photography
- Joe Chiccarelli – lead engineer, mixing
- Steve Churchyard – mixing
- Luis Conte – percussion
- Todd Edwards – art concept
- John Goodmanson – mixing
- Danny Kortchmar – production
- George Marino – mastering
- Justin Meldal-Johnsen – bass
- Steve Ripley – mixing
- Steve Thompson – mixing
- Greg Wells – bass, acoustic guitar, production
- Marc VanGool – technician
- Sam Farrar – bass
- Abraham Laboriel – bass on "Penny & Me"

== Charts ==
Chart performance for Underneath
Chart (2004–2005)	Peak position
Canadian Albums (Nielsen SoundScan)	56
French Albums (SNEP)	173
Italian Albums (FIMI)	53
Italian Albums (Musica e dischi)	30
Japanese Albums (Oricon)	70
Scottish Albums (Official Charts)	41
UK Albums (Official Charts)	49
UK Independent Albums (Official Charts)	7
US Billboard 200	25
US Independent Albums (Billboard)	1
