= Anthem (Hanson album) =

Studio album by Hanson
- Released: June 18, 2013
- Recorded: 2012 – 2013
- Genre: Pop rock
- Length: 47:58
- Label: 3CG
- Producer: Hanson

Hanson chronology
Shout It Out (2010)	Anthem (2013)	Middle of Everywhere: The Greatest Hits (2017)

Singles from Anthem
- 1. "Get the Girl Back" Released: April 9, 2013

Professional ratings
Aggregate scores
Source	Rating
Metacritic	66/100
Review scores
Source	Rating
AllMusic	3/5 stars
PopMatters	6/10
Target Audience Reviews	3.6/5

Anthem is the sixth studio album released by American pop rock group Hanson. The album is the fourth release through their own label 3CG Records. The album was released on June 18, 2013 in the US and on July 1, 2013 in the UK and Europe. The album charted at No. 22 on the US Billboard 200, making it their eighth album to chart in the top 40 of the US Billboard 200; the album also charted on No. 5 on the US Independent Albums Chart.

On April 5, a blog on the group's website written by Zac Hanson revealed that three songs were cut from the album; "Nothing on Me" (lead vocal by Isaac), "Get So Low" (lead vocal by Zac) and "All I Ever Needed" (lead vocal by Taylor).

== Track listing ==
All songs written and produced by Isaac Hanson, Taylor Hanson and Zac Hanson.

No.	Title	Length
1.	"Fired Up" (Lead vocals: Taylor)	3:30
2.	"I've Got Soul" (Lead vocals: Taylor)	2:56
3.	"You Can't Stop Us" (Lead vocals: Zac, Taylor, Isaac)	3:26
4.	"Get the Girl Back" (Lead vocals: Taylor)	3:46
5.	"Juliet" (Lead vocals: Zac)	3:11
6.	"Already Home" (Lead vocals: Taylor)	3:59
7.	"For Your Love" (Lead vocals: Isaac)	3:17
8.	"Lost Without You" (Lead vocals: Taylor)	4:11
9.	"Cut Right Through Me" (Lead vocals: Taylor)	3:10
10.	"Scream and Be Free" (Lead vocals: Zac)	4:22
11.	"Tragic Symphony" (Lead vocals: Taylor)	3:10
12.	"Tonight" (Lead vocals: Taylor, Isaac)	4:37
13.	"Save Me from Myself (Encore)" (Lead vocals: Zac)	3:56

== Personnel ==
As listed at allmusic

=== Hanson ===
- Taylor Hanson: Acoustic and Fender Rhodes electric piano, Wurlitzer, Hammond organ, clapping, drums, percussion, vocals
- Isaac Hanson: Acoustic and electric guitars, bass, clapping, vocals
- Zac Hanson: Drums, percussion, clapping, vocals

=== Additional personnel ===
- Chad Copelin, Joe Karnes – Bass
- Imani Coppola, Curtis Stewart – Violin
- Dan Higgins – Saxophone
- Bill Reichenbach – Trombone
- Tom Malone – Saxophone, trumpet, trombone
- Yuri Lemeshev – Accordion
- Michael Fitzpatrick – Vocals
- Strings arranged by Imani Coppola; horns arranged by Jerry Hey and Tom Malone

== Production ==
- Arranged and produced by Hanson
- Recording engineers: Steve Churchyard and Ryan Williamson; assisted by Manuel Calderón, Charles Godfrey and David Schwerkolt
- Mixed by Tom Lord-Alge
- Mastered by Andrew Mendelson

== Release history ==
List of release dates, showing region, label and format
Region	Date	Label	Format(s)
Australia	June 18, 2013	3CG	CD, digital download
Canada	June 18, 2013	3CG	CD, digital download
Japan	June 18, 2013	3CG	CD, digital download
United States	June 18, 2013	3CG	CD, digital download
United Kingdom	July 1, 2013	3CG	CD, digital download
Brazil	July 1, 2013	3CG	CD, digital download

== Chart positions ==
Chart (2013–2014)	Peak position
Australian Albums (ARIA)	65
U.S. Billboard 200	22
