= Stand Up, Stand Up =

EP by Hanson
- Released: September 2009
- Recorded: May 2009
- Genre: Pop, acoustic
- Length: 19:59
- Label: 3CG Records
- Producer: Hanson

Hanson chronology
The Walk (2007)	Stand Up, Stand Up (2009)	Shout It Out (2010)

Stand Up, Stand Up is a live acoustic EP released by Hanson, recorded at the Tulsa Little Theatre in May 2009 with an intimate crowd of about 700 fan-club members over two days. It features four acoustic versions of new Hanson tracks for their upcoming album Shout It Out, which was released on June 8, 2010, along with the album version of "World's on Fire"

The EP became available worldwide on all major digital stores including iTunes, Amazon, Rhapsody and Napster, December 7, 2009. It also became available on all major US mobile network music stores.

== Track listing ==
All songs written and produced by Isaac Hanson, Taylor Hanson and Zac Hanson.

1. "These Walls" – 3:41
2. "Carry You There" – 4:30
3. "Use Me Up" – 3:51
4. "Waiting for This" – 3:11
5. "World's on Fire" – 4:46
