= Albertane Tour =

1998 concert tour by Hanson

- Tour by Hanson
- Promotional poster for the tour
- Associated album: Middle of Nowhere
- Start date: June 9, 1998
- End date: September 30, 1998
- Legs: 2
- No. of shows: 3 in Europe; 33 in North America; 36 in total

Hanson concert chronology
- Albertane Tour (1998); This Time Around Tour (2000)

The Albertane Tour was the debut tour by American band Hanson. The tour supported the band's debut studio album, Middle of Nowhere (1997). The tour predominantly visited North America with additional dates in France, Germany and England. The Live from Albertane album was released the following fall to capture performances on the tour. The documentary film The Road to Albertane was also made to record the touring experience for the three Hanson brothers.

== Opening act ==
- Admiral Twin (North America)
- Baha Men (Los Angeles, Mountain View, Morrison)
- John Popper (John Popper)

== Setlist ==
The following setlist was obtained from the June 29, 1998 concert, held at the Pine Knob Music Theatre in Clarkston, Michigan. It does not represent all concerts for the duration of the tour.

1. "Gimme Some Lovin'" / "Shake a Tail Feather"
2. "Thinking of You"
3. "Where's the Love"
4. "River"
5. "Madeline"
6. "Weird"
7. "Sometimes"
8. "Stories"
9. "With You in Your Dreams"
10. "Soldier"
11. "More Than Anything" (performed by Isaac Hanson)
12. "Speechless"
13. "Ever Lonely"
14. "Money (That's What I Want)"
15. "I Will Come to You"
16. "Good Lovin'"
17. "MMMBop"
18. "Man from Milwaukee"
  Encore
19. "Look at You"
20. "Summertime Blues"

== Tour dates ==
Date	City	Country	Venue
Europe
June 9, 1998	Paris	France	Zénith de Paris
June 13, 1998	Cologne	Germany	Kölner Sporthalle
June 16, 1998	London	England	Wembley Arena
North America
June 20, 1998	Montreal	Canada	Molson Centre
June 23, 1998	Toronto	Canada	Molson Canadian Amphitheatre
June 26, 1998	Mansfield	United States	Great Woods Center for the Performing Arts
June 29, 1998	Clarkston	United States	Pine Knob Music Theatre
July 2, 1998	Bristow	United States	Nissan Pavilion
July 5, 1998	Atlanta	United States	Coca-Cola Lakewood Amphitheatre
July 8, 1998	Tulsa	United States	Mabee Center
July 12, 1998	Los Angeles	United States	Hollywood Bowl
July 15, 1998	Mountain View	United States	Shoreline Amphitheatre
July 18, 1998	Morrison	United States	Red Rocks Amphitheatre
July 21, 1998	Seattle	United States	KeyArena
July 25, 1998	Milwaukee	United States	Marcus Amphitheater
July 28, 1998	Auburn Hills	United States	The Palace of Auburn Hills
July 31, 1998	Tinley Park	United States	New World Music Theatre
August 3, 1998	Cincinnati	United States	Riverbend Music Center
August 6, 1998	Nashville	United States	Starwood Amphitheatre
August 9, 1998	Charlotte	United States	Blockbuster Pavilion
August 12, 1998	Virginia Beach	United States	GTE Virginia Beach Amphitheater
August 15, 1998	Hershey	United States	Hersheypark Stadium
August 18, 1998	Philadelphia	United States	CoreStates Center
August 21, 1998	Philadelphia	United States	CoreStates Center
August 24, 1998	East Rutherford	United States	Continental Airlines Arena
August 27, 1998	Pittsburgh	United States	Civic Arena
August 30, 1998	Hartford	United States	Hartford Civic Center
September 2, 1998	Wantagh	United States	Jones Beach Amphitheater
September 5, 1998	Wantagh	United States	Jones Beach Amphitheater
September 8, 1998	Cuyahoga Falls	United States	Blossom Music Center
September 11, 1998	Albany	United States	Pepsi Arena
September 18, 1998	West Palm Beach	United States	Coral Sky Amphitheatre
September 21, 1998	Orlando	United States	Orlando Arena
September 24, 1998	Tulsa	United States	Mabee Center
September 27, 1998	The Woodlands	United States	Cynthia Woods Mitchell Pavilion
September 30, 1998	Dallas	United States	Reunion Arena

== Documentary ==
The Road to Albertane, released on VHS in 1998, documented the tour, compiling clips from their live concerts, interviews, and interactions with fans.
