= Lost Without Each Other =

2005 single by Hanson

Single by Hanson

from the album Underneath
- B-side: "Strong Enough to Break" (live); "Crazy Beautiful" (live); "Misery" (live)
- Released: August 9, 2004
- Length: 3:44
- Label: 3CG; Cooking Vinyl
- Songwriters: Gregg Alexander; Isaac Hanson; Taylor Hanson; Zac Hanson
- Producer: Hanson

Hanson singles chronology
"Penny & Me" (2004)	"Lost Without Each Other" (2004)	"Someone (Laissons nous une chance)" (2005)

Music video
- "Lost Without Each Other" on YouTube

"Lost Without Each Other" is a song written and performed by American pop-rock band Hanson. It was released as the second single from the band's third studio album, Underneath (2004), on August 9, 2004; in Australia, it was issued as a double A-side with "Strong Enough to Break" in February 2005. The song peaked at number 39 on the UK Singles Chart but failed to obtain any significant success elsewhere.

== Track listings ==
All songs were written by Isaac Hanson, Taylor Hanson, and Zac Hanson. Additional writers are noted in parentheses.

UK CD1

1. "Lost Without Each Other" (album version) (Gregg Alexander)
2. "Strong Enough to Break" (live) (Greg Wells)

UK CD2

1. "Lost Without Each Other" (album version) (Alexander)
2. "Crazy Beautiful" (live)
3. "Misery" (live)
4. "Lost Without Each Other" (video)

Australian and New Zealand CD single

1. "Lost Without Each Other" (album version) (Alexander) – 3:44
2. "Strong Enough to Break" (live) (Wells) – 3:32
3. "This Time Around" (Underneath acoustic live) – 5:59
4. "Lost Without Each Other" (video) – 3:42

Japanese CD EP

1. "Lost Without Each Other" (Alexander)
2. "Misery" (live from Underneath acoustic)
3. "I Will Come to You" (live from House of Blues) (Barry Mann, Cynthia Weil)
4. "Deeper" (live from Underneath acoustic)
5. "If Only" (live from Astro Hall)

== Charts ==
Chart (2005)	Peak position
Australia (ARIA) with "Strong Enough to Break"	73
Italy (Musica e dischi)	32
Scottish Singles Sales (Official Charts)	30
UK Singles (Official Charts)	39
UK Indie (Official Charts)	8

== Release history ==
Region	Date	Format(s)	Label(s)	Ref(s).
United States	August 9, 2004	Hot adult contemporary; contemporary hit radio	3CG	
Japan	October 21, 2004	CD	3CG	
Australia	February 7, 2005	CD	Big	
United Kingdom	March 28, 2005	CD	3CG; Cooking Vinyl	
