= I Was Born =

2017 single by Hanson

Single by Hanson

from the album Middle of Everywhere - The Greatest Hits
- Released: May 26, 2017
- Genre: Pop rock, folk rock
- Length: 3:36
- Label: 3CG Records
- Songwriter: Hanson
- Producer: Hanson

Hanson singles chronology
"Get the Girl Back" (2013)	"I Was Born" (2017)	"Siren Call" (2018)

Music video
- "I Was Born" on YouTube

"I Was Born" is a song written and performed by American pop rock band Hanson. It is the lead single from their compilation album, Middle of Everywhere – The Greatest Hits (2017). Lead vocals are provided by Taylor Hanson, with Isaac Hanson and Zac Hanson as backing vocals.

The single was announced by the band on March 14, 2017 on their YouTube channel, followed by an acoustic snippet. It was released on May 26, 2017 on iTunes as a digital single.

== Background ==
On May 13, 2017 the band announced the Middle of Everywhere World Tour, for celebrating their 25th anniversary as a band and 20 years of their debut studio album, Middle of Nowhere, which features their first hit, "MMMBop". On July 23, 2017, they announced a compilation album, called Middle of Everywhere – The Greatest Hits. It is scheduled to be released on September 8, 2017.

== Music video ==
The official music video was released on May 26, 2017. The cast features 11 of the band's 12 children. The whole video was mostly filmed in black and white. It features clips of the children lip-syncing and enjoying the song alongside their fathers performing the song. Ending the bridge, the vocal leader Taylor breaks a guitar, followed by all black and white turning into color. At the end of the song, all the scenes become black and white again.

The drummer, Zac Hanson, told People magazine: "Featuring our own kids made sense because we knew they would share an honest performance”. Taylor added: “From the earliest conversations about this song, we imagined kids featured in the video to elevate the song’s message of unbridled optimism for the future”.
