= Urban Tulsa Weekly =

Independent weekly newspaper in USA

- Type: Alternative weekly
- Format: Tabloid
- Publisher: Keith Skrzypczak
- Editor: Keith Skrzypczak
- Founded: 1991; 35 years ago
- Ceased publication: November 5, 2013; 12 years ago
- Headquarters: 710 South Kenosha; Tulsa, Oklahoma 74120 United States
- Circulation: 34,950
- Website: Urban Tulsa Weekly

The Urban Tulsa Weekly was an independent weekly newspaper with a circulation of about 35,000 distributed to the Tulsa metropolitan area every Thursday.

Published and edited by Keith Skrzypczak, the newspaper struggled for years under his erratic leadership before ultimately folding when its printer threatened a lawsuit over unpaid invoices. The newspaper featured certain regular features including a "Capitolist" column by Arnold Hamilton, "Commentary" and "In the City." The Weekly also featured an annual "Hot 100" list naming Tulsa's most influential people for the year.

== Controversy ==
On October 25, 2011, The Daily Cartoonist released an article announcing that Urban Tulsa cartoonist David Simpson had been accused of plagiarizing the work of Jeff MacNelly.

Subsequent investigations by Poynter revealed another cartoon in which Simpson had plagiarized MacNelly's work.

== Shutdown ==
On November 5, 2013, it was reported that the Urban Tulsa Weekly had closed after operating for over twenty years.
