= Emma Daumas =

French singer-songwriter (born 1983)

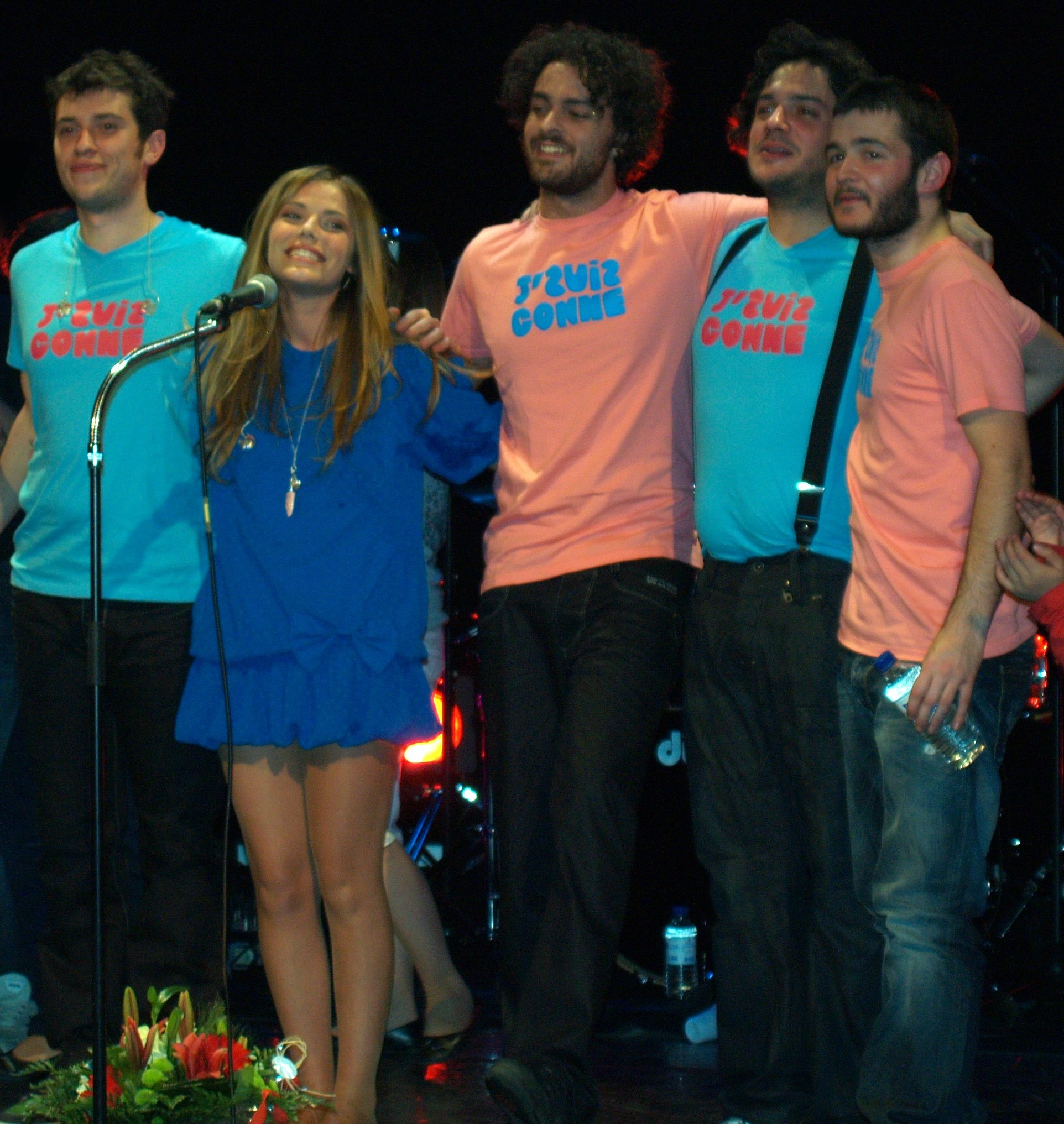
- Emma Daumas and her musicians at Saint-Martin-de-Crau in France

Background information
- Born: Manuelle Daumas; 23 November 1983 (age 42); Avignon, France
- Genres: Pop rock, chanson
- Occupations: Singer-songwriter, performer
- Years active: 2000–present
- Website: emmadaumas.artistes.universalmusic.fr

Manuelle "Emma" Daumas (born 23 November 1983, in Avignon) is a French singer-songwriter and performer, known for her participation in Star Academy.

== Discography ==
=== Albums ===
- Le saut de l'ange (2003)
- Effets secondaires (2006)
- Le Chemin de la maison (2008)

=== EPs ===
- Acoustic (2010)
- Vivante (2016)
- L'art des naufrages (2021)

=== CD-Book ===
- Les larmes de crocodile et autres fables (2010)

=== Singles ===
- Au jour le jour (2003)
- Si tu savais (2003)
- Tu seras (2004) – Gold disk
- Figurine humaine (2004)
- J'attends (2004)
- Someone (Laissons nous une chance) – song recorded with Hanson and released as a limited single plus as a track on the French version of Hanson's 2005 album Underneath
- You got me, Eskobar feat. Emma Daumas (2005)
- S'il te plaît (October 2005) – the first extract from her second album Effets secondaires, only available on download
- Regarde nous (April 2006)
- Club Addict
- Mon tombeur
- J'suis conne (June 2008) – first single from Chemin de la maison
- Secret défense (2009)
