= Someone (Laissons nous une chance) =

Single by Hanson featuring Emma Daumas

from the album Underneath
- Released: February 2, 2005
- Recorded: 2001
- Genre: Pop rock
- Label: 3CG Records / Cooking Vinyl
- Songwriters: Isaac Hanson, Taylor Hanson, Zac Hanson, Damon Lee, Dominique Grimaldi and Emma Daumas.
- Producer: Hanson

Hanson featuring Emma Daumas singles chronology
"Lost Without Each Other" (2004)	"Someone (Laissons nous une chance)" (2005)	"Great Divide" (2006)

"Someone (Laissons nous une chance)" is a song by American pop/rock band Hanson and French singer Emma Daumas. It was written mainly by Isaac Hanson while attending Miles Copeland's annual "songwriting bootcamp" at Château de Marouatte in France in May 2001. Daumas was chosen to collaborate with Hanson for this song. "Someone (Laissons nous une chance)" was released on the French version of Hanson's album Underneath in February 2005, with rumors that a single would be released in the coming months. The single was not heavily promoted and a retail single was never released, although a few promo versions of the single were pressed in the UK, France and Canada. The song had some limited airplay on the radio.

== Track listing ==
"Someone (Laissons nous une chance)" written by Isaac Hanson, Taylor Hanson, Zac Hanson, Damon Lee, Dominique Grimaldi and Emma Daumas. "Dream Girl" written by Hanson. "Ain't No Sunshine" written by Bill Withers.

French and Canadian promo release:

1. "Someone (Laissons nous une chance)"
2. "Dream Girl"
3. "Ain't No Sunshine" (live; taken from the Underneath Acoustic Live DVD)

UK promo release:

1. "Someone (Laissons nous une chance)"
