= NEMO Music Showcase and Conference =

Annual music event in Boston, Massachusetts, U.S.

The NEMO Music Showcase and Conference was an annual music event in Boston, Massachusetts. According to BMI it was:

... one of North America's premier music industry events. With three nights of music (featuring almost 250 artist showcases and the prestigious Boston Music Awards), two full days of panels, workshops, clinics and a trade show, NEMO is the ideal forum for musicians, industry professionals, and music enthusiasts who want to explore the most up-to-date, current information and critical issues that are confronting today's music industry.

NEMO closed its doors in 2006.
