= The Road to Albertane =

Video by Hanson
- Released: 1998
- Recorded: 1998
- Genre: Pop
- Length: 74 minutes
- Label: MOE Films

Hanson chronology
Tulsa, Tokyo & the Middle of Nowhere (1997)	The Road to Albertane (1998)	At the Fillmore (2001)

The Road to Albertane is a 1998 documentary that follows the American teenage band Hanson on their first major concert tour, the Albertane Tour.

== Charts ==
Chart (1998–1999)	Peak position
US Music Video Sales (Billboard)	1
