= Give a Little =

Single by Hanson

from the album Shout It Out
- Released: April 5, 2011
- Recorded: 2010
- Genre: Pop rock
- Length: 3:53
- Label: 3CG Records
- Songwriter(s): Isaac Hanson, Taylor Hanson and Zac Hanson
- Producer(s): Hanson

Hanson singles chronology
"Thinking 'bout Somethin'" (2010)	"Give a Little" (2011)	"Get the Girl Back" (2013)

Music video
- "Give a Little" on YouTube

"Give a Little" is the second single written and performed by American pop/rock band Hanson from their fifth studio album Shout It Out. Lead vocals are provided by Taylor Hanson, with Isaac Hanson and Zac Hanson as backing vocals.

The single was announced by the band on January 13, 2011 on the Hanson.NET members e-mail. It was released on April 05, 2011 on iTunes as a digital single including remixes produced by the band. A 4-track US promo CD single surfaced on eBay mid. February and was sold for about $79.

To further promote the song, the band performed the song on twelfth season of Dancing with the Stars, on April 26, 2011.

The song is featured at the opening scene from the 2010 movie Trust. The movie is about a teenage girl who is targeted by an online sexual predator.

== Background ==
The upbeat pop/rock number is the second single from American band Hanson's eighth studio album, Shout It Out. The song acts as the follow-up to Thinking 'Bout Somethin'. "'Give a Little' is the perfect connector to the first single," Taylor Hanson told MTV News. "There's this energy to it. Strangely, there's this dance theme. We're not known for our dancing, but dancing is this metaphor that's in the record." "[The metaphor] is kind of 'Get out there and let loose,' " Taylor added. "Spring will be here before we know it, and the song is upbeat and hopefully engaging."

== Critical reception ==
Gregory Robson from Absolute Punk has said, that: "'Give a Little' seem to rely on the horn section to do most of the work, but this isn't necessarily a bad thing".

== Track listing ==
Written by Isaac Hanson, Taylor Hanson and Zac Hanson.

1. "Give A Little" (radio mix) (3:35)
2. "Give A Little" (RAC mix) (3:41)
3. "Give A Little" (Questlove mix) (4:16)
4. "Give A Little" (album mix) (3:53)

UK Digital Release Track listing

1. "Give A Little" (radio mix – 3:35
2. "Give A Little" (RAC mix) – 3:41
3. "Give A Little" (Questlove mix) – 4:16
4. "Give A Little" (album mix) – 3:53
5. "Give A Little" (Mind the Gap mix By Steven Charles Boone) – 3:53
6. "Give A Little" (Lose Control mix By Craig McClellan) – 3:37

== Promotion ==
The band promoted the song on the twelfth season of Dancing with the Stars, performing first their hit MMMBop on April 25, 2011 and later "Give a Little", on April 26, 2011. The band also performed it on Jimmy Kimmel Live!.

== Music video ==
The music video was shot on the same weekend as "Thinking 'Bout Somethin'" and was released on VH1.com on February 22, 2011. It features dancers from the "Thinking 'Bout Somethin'" video, now having a dance-off on a white studio. The band also recreates some elements from the Shout It Out album cover using the same colors and imagery. Family members as daughters and sons, brothers, sisters and wives are also pictured dancing on the video as well.

=== Background ===
Taylor Hanson said the guys have a new mission with this video. "With the 'Give A Little' video, we're more thinking, 'Hey this is about creating a template, a backdrop that just makes you love the song more,' " he explained to MTV News. "The difference with this song and the video is that it's much simpler and much more about getting the song ingrained in your mind, thus was a very different thing." "When we made the video, it was kind of the release after the high production of 'Thinking 'Bout Somethin', " Taylor explained. "With the 'Give a Little' video, it's almost back to the blank slate. We invited all these dancers. We just set up a room, cranked up the music and threw a party and let people dance. The attitude is not about everyone doing the same moves; it's about putting a unique twist." "There's this energy to it," Taylor said. "Strangely, there's this dance theme. We're not known for our dancing, but dancing is this metaphor that's in the record. Kind of, 'Get out there and let loose.'

=== Reception ===
Nicole James from MTV Buzzworthy has said, positively, that: ""Give A Little" features the brothers Hanson playing their instruments in front of a simple white backdrop. The song starts off slow as they sing about wooing ladies (something that Hanson knows just a little bit about), while the video cuts to different couples getting their dance on. The momentum builds, and pretty soon there's paint being splattered everywhere, and everyone on the set is getting down. Like I said, adorable.And we're totally digging the low-budget video thing. "Give A Little" is a snappy pop song with a to-the-point video that focuses on the catchiness of the track. No bells and whistles, just singing, dancing and Taylor Hanson wearing Ray-Bans. What else do you need in life? NOTHING...in my opinion". Jocelyn Vega also from MTV was also very positive with the video, saying: " The sparse performance video for the Shout It Out track seamlessly includes dancers of all backgrounds showing off their skills. It's a far cry from last year's over-the-top clip for "Thinking 'Bout Somethin'," an homage to the Blues Brothers. She said, that: "The video is, in fact, pretty simple: It features cardboard cutouts, ballerinas, dancing couples, some paint splatter and even hip-hop dancers. The guys get in the action during a big dance break, playing instruments while surrounded by the clip's various performers". "Spring will be here before we know it, and the song is upbeat and hopefully engaging", concluded Vega.

== Release history ==
Region	Date	Format
United States	April 5, 2011	digital download
United States	April 12, 2011	Hot Modern/ Adult Contemporary Radio
