= Get the Girl Back =

Single by Hanson

from the album Anthem
- Released: April 9, 2013
- Recorded: 2012–2013
- Genre: Pop rock
- Length: 3:46
- Label: 3CG Records
- Songwriter(s): Hanson
- Producer(s): Hanson

Hanson singles chronology
"Give a Little" (2011)	"Get the Girl Back" (2013)	"I Was Born" (2017)

Music video
- "Get the Girl Back" on YouTube

"Get the Girl Back" is a song written and performed by American pop/rock band Hanson. It is the only single from their album, Anthem (2013). Lead vocals are provided by Taylor Hanson.

The song was released in the U.S. on April 9, 2013, and reached No. 39 on the Billboard Adult Top 40 chart, making it Hanson's first single in over nine years to chart on any US Billboard chart.

== Track listing ==
Written by Isaac Hanson, Taylor Hanson and Zac Hanson.

1. "Get the Girl Back" – 3:46

== Music video ==
A music video for the single included actresses Nikki Reed and Kat Dennings, as well as Drake Bell and Drew Seeley, who are all fans of the band.

== Reception ==
Adam Soybel of POP! Goes The Charts gave the song a positive review, writing that the song is "a full-out jam and soars to new levels for the band."

== Chart positions ==
Chart (2013)	Peak position
US Adult Top 40 (Billboard)	39
