= Thinking 'bout Somethin' =

Single by Hanson

from the album Shout It Out
- Released: April 20, 2010
- Recorded: 2009
- Genre: Pop rock, power pop
- Length: 3:45 (album version)
- Label: 3CG Records
- Songwriter: Hanson
- Producer: Hanson

Hanson singles chronology
"Go" (2007)	"Thinking 'bout Somethin'" (2010)	"Give a Little" (2011)

Music video
- "Thinking 'bout Somethin'" on YouTube

"Thinking 'bout Somethin'" is a song written and performed by American pop/rock band Hanson. It is the first single from their fifth album, Shout It Out (2010). Lead vocals are provided by Taylor Hanson.

The song was released on iTunes in the U.S. on April 20, 2010 as an exclusive single before the release of the album.

A music video was released to promote the single. The video was directed by Todd Edwards, co-founder of Blue Yonder Films, and filmed by Kelly Kerr a Tulsa local. It was released for public viewing on their Myspace channel on April 15, 2010. Weird Al Yankovic has a cameo appearance as the tambourine player. The filming of the music video was not done using a regular video camera but instead using the Canon EOS 7D dSLR and Nikon AI lenses. This was done to mimic vintage filming.

The video is also a pastiche of the "Shake a Tail Feather" number from the 1980 film The Blues Brothers.

== Track listing ==
Written by Isaac Hanson, Taylor Hanson and Zac Hanson.

1. "Thinking 'Bout Somethin'" (single version) – 3:45

== Release history ==
Release dates and formats for "Thinking 'bout Somethin'"
Region	Date	Format	Label(s)	Ref.
United States	July 13, 2010	Mainstream airplay	3CG	
