= Penny & Me =

2004 single by Hanson

Single by Hanson

from the album Underneath
- B-side: "Every Word I Say"; "Hey"
- Released: February 23, 2004
- Genre: Rock
- Length: 3:40
- Label: 3CG; Cooking Vinyl
- Songwriters: Isaac Hanson; Taylor Hanson; Zac Hanson
- Producers: Hanson; Danny Kortchmar

Hanson singles chronology
"This Time Around" (2000)	"Penny & Me" (2004)	"Lost Without Each Other" (2004)

Music video
- "Penny & Me" on YouTube

"Penny & Me" is a song written and performed by American pop-rock band Hanson, produced by Hanson and Danny Kortchmar. It was released as the first single from the band's third commercial studio album, Underneath (2004), on February 23, 2004. The song peaked at number two on the US Billboard Hot 100 Singles Sales chart, number 28 on the Irish Singles Chart, and number 10 on the UK Singles Chart. It also reached the top 40 in Italy and was a minor hit in Germany and the Netherlands.

== Music video ==
The music video features actress Samaire Armstrong and was directed by Chris Applebaum.

== Track listings ==
All songs were written by Isaac Hanson, Taylor Hanson, and Zac Hanson.

US CD single

1. "Penny & Me" (radio edit)
2. "Every Word I Say"
3. "Penny & Me"
4. "Hey"

Australian CD single

1. "Penny & Me"
2. "Every Word I Say"
3. "Penny & Me"
4. "Hey"
5. "Penny & Me" (video)

UK CD1

1. "Penny & Me" (radio edit) – 3:40
2. "MMMBop" (live) – 3:27

UK CD2

1. "Penny & Me" (album version)
2. "Every Word I Say"
3. "Underneath" (live acoustic)
4. "Penny & Me" (music video)
5. "Underneath" (live concert video)

== Charts ==
Chart (2004–2005)	Peak position
Australia (ARIA)	65
Germany (GfK)	99
Ireland (IRMA)	28
Italy (FIMI)	33
Italy (Musica e dischi)	23
Netherlands (Single Top 100)	94
Scottish Singles Sales (Official Charts)	8
UK Singles (Official Charts)	10
UK Indie (Official Charts)	3
US Hot 100 Singles Sales (Billboard)	2

== Release history ==
Region	Date	Format(s)	Label(s)	Ref.
United States	February 23, 2004	Hot adult contemporary radio	3CG	
United States	March 8, 2004	Contemporary hit radio	3CG	
Australia	September 27, 2004	CD	3CG; Cooking Vinyl	
United Kingdom	January 24, 2005	CD	3CG; Cooking Vinyl	

== Moonlight version ==
Twenty years after the release of the album Underneath, Hanson announced that they would be releasing Underneath: Complete in October 2024. Hanson also published a music video for a more downtempo "Moonlight Version" of "Penny & Me" in April featuring Samaire Armstrong, who played "Penny" in the original music video, and Taylor Hanson's daughter Penelope, whose named was inspired by the song.
