= If Only (Hanson song) =

2000 single by Hanson

Single by Hanson

from the album This Time Around
- Released: April 3, 2000
- Length: 4:30 (album version); 4:01 (international radio edit)
- Label: Island; Mercury
- Songwriters: Isaac Hanson; Taylor Hanson; Zac Hanson
- Producers: Stephen Lironi; Hanson

Hanson singles chronology
"Thinking of You" (1998)	"If Only" (2000)	"This Time Around" (2000)

Music video
- "If Only" on YouTube

"If Only" is a song written and performed by American pop rock band Hanson. It was released outside the United States on April 3, 2000, as the lead single from the band's second studio album, This Time Around (2000). Featuring John Popper of Blues Traveler on harmonica, the song reached the top 10 in Australia, Finland, Italy, and Spain.

== Music video ==
The music video features the group traveling in a desert on their tour bus, unloading their equipment to shoot the video.

== Track listings ==
All songs were written by Isaac Hanson, Taylor Hanson, and Zac Hanson.

UK CD single

1. "If Only" (radio edit) – 4:04
2. "If Only" (JFP club mix) – 5:58
3. "Smile" – 3:16
4. "If Only" (video) – 3:58

UK cassette single

1. "If Only" (radio edit) – 4:04
2. "MMMBop" (live from Albertane) – 4:11

European CD single

1. "If Only" (radio edit) – 3:59
2. "If Only" (JFP club mix) – 5:58

European digipak and Japanese CD single

1. "If Only" (radio edit) – 3:59
2. "If Only" (LP version) – 4:30
3. "Look at You" (live from Albertane) – 4:21
4. "This Time Around" / "Runaway Run" / "In the City" (album snippets) – 2:40

Australian maxi-CD single

1. "If Only" (radio edit) – 3:59
2. "If Only" (album version) – 4:30
3. "I Don't Know" – 4:17
4. "If Only" (UK radio mix) – 4:04
5. "If Only" (video – enhanced)

== Personnel ==
Personnel are adapted from the European CD single liner notes.

- Isaac Hanson – vocals, electric guitar, acoustic guitar
- Taylor Hanson – vocals, piano, organ, percussion, harmonica
- Zac Hanson – vocals, drums
- John Popper – harmonica

== Charts ==
=== Weekly charts ===
Chart (2000)	Peak position
Australia (ARIA)	9
Belgium (Ultratop 50 Flanders)	47
Belgium (Ultratip Bubbling Under Wallonia)	8
Canada Top Singles (RPM)	64
Czech Republic (IFPI)	19
Estonia (Eesti Top 20)	8
Europe (Eurochart Hot 100)	34
Europe (European Hit Radio)	14
Finland (Suomen virallinen lista)	8
Finland Airplay (Radiosoittolista)	8
France (SNEP)	87
Germany (GfK)	68
Iceland (Íslenski Listinn Topp 40)	21
Ireland (IRMA)	30
Italy (FIMI)	9
Italy (Musica e dischi)	22
Italy Airplay (Music & Media)	7
Latvia (Latvijas Top 20)	7
Netherlands (Dutch Top 40)	23
Netherlands (Single Top 100)	38
New Zealand (Recorded Music NZ)	27
Norway (VG-lista)	17
Scottish Singles Sales (Official Charts)	11
Spain (Promusicae)	3
Spain Airplay (Top 40 Radio)	1
Sweden (Sverigetopplistan)	13
Switzerland (Schweizer Hitparade)	47
UK Singles (Official Charts)	15
UK Airplay (Music Week)	39

=== Year-end charts ===
Chart (2000)	Position
Brazil (Crowley)	75
Europe (European Hit Radio)	77

== Certifications ==
Region	Certification	Certified units/sales
Australia (ARIA)	Gold	35,000^{^}
^{^} Shipments figures based on certification alone.

== Release history ==
Region	Date	Format(s)	Label(s)	Ref.
Europe	April 3, 2000	CD	Island	
United Kingdom	April 17, 2000	CD; cassette	Mercury	
Japan	April 19, 2000	CD	Island	
