= This Time Around (Hanson song) =

2000 single by Hanson

Single by Hanson

from the album This Time Around
- B-side: "Love Song"
- Released: April 4, 2000
- Length: 4:17
- Label: Island
- Songwriters: Isaac Hanson; Taylor Hanson; Zachary Hanson
- Producers: Stephen Lironi; Hanson; Mark Hudson (vocals)

Hanson singles chronology
"If Only" (2000)	"This Time Around" (2000)	"Penny & Me" (2004)

Music video
- "This Time Around" on YouTube

"This Time Around" is a song written and performed by American pop rock band Hanson. It was the title track and second single from the band's second studio album, This Time Around (2000). American singer Jonny Lang plays an electric guitar on the song. It was released as a commercial single in the United States and Canada on April 4, 2000.

The song peaked at number 20 on the US Billboard Hot 100, number 13 on the Canadian RPM 100 Hit Tracks chart, and number one on the Canadian Singles Chart. It did not experience any chart success elsewhere except in Australia, where it peaked at number 42, and in Spain, where it was a top-20 radio hit. A music video directed by David Meyers was made for the song.

== Track listings ==
All songs were written by Isaac Hanson, Taylor Hanson, and Zachary Hanson.

US CD and cassette single

1. "This Time Around" – 4:17
2. "Love Song" – 4:06

Australian CD1

1. "This Time Around" (radio edit)
2. "This Time Around" (remix)
3. "Lonely Again"
4. "If Only" (Bitten by the Black Dog)
5. "This Time Around" (enhanced video)

Australian CD2

1. "This Time Around" (radio edit)
2. "If Only" (JFP club mix)
3. "If Only" (JFP dub mix)
4. "If Only" (live on The Panel, March 2000)
5. "Look at You" (live from Albertane)

European CD single

1. "This Time Around" (radio edit) – 3:55
2. "This Time Around" (remix) – 3:45

== Personnel ==
Personnel are adapted from the Australian CD1 liner notes.

- Hanson – production, vocal production
  - Isaac Hanson – vocals, electric and acoustic guitar, writing
  - Taylor Hanson – vocals, piano, organ, percussion, harmonica, writing
  - Zachary Hanson – vocals, drums, writing
- Jonny Lang – electric guitar
- Stephen Lironi – production
- Mark Hudson – vocal production
- Tom Lord-Alge – mixing

== Charts ==
Chart (2000)	Peak position
Australia (ARIA)	42
Canada (Nielsen SoundScan)	1
Canada Top Singles (RPM)	13
Canada Adult Contemporary (RPM)	51
Spain Airplay (Top 40 Radio)	12
US Billboard Hot 100	20
US Pop Airplay (Billboard)	27

== Certifications ==
Region	Certification	Certified units/sales
United States (RIAA)	Gold	500,000^{^}
^{^} Shipments figures based on certification alone.

== Release history ==
Region	Date	Format(s)	Label(s)	Ref.
United States	March 7, 2000	Contemporary hit radio	Island	
United States	April 4, 2000	CD; cassette	Island	
Canada	April 4, 2000	CD	Island	
