= 2005 MTV Video Music Brazil =

Award ceremony

- Date: 29 September 2005
- Location: Credicard Hall, São Paulo, São Paulo
- Country: Brazil
- Hosted by: Selton Mello
- Most awards: Autoramas and Pitty (3 each)
- Most nominations: Ira! (6)

Television/radio coverage
- Network: MTV Brasil

The 2005 MTV Video Music Brazil was held on 29 September 2005, at the Credicard Hall in São Paulo, honoring the best Brazilian music videos. The ceremony was hosted by actor Selton Mello for the second consecutive time.

== Winners and nominees ==
The nominees were announced on 19 August 2005. Winners are listed first and highlighted in bold.

| Video of the Year: Viewer's Choice | Best New Artist |
|---|---|
| **CPM 22 – "Um Minuto para o Fim do Mundo"**; B5 – "Só Mais uma Vez"; Capital Inicial – "Respirar Você"; Catedral – "A Poesia e Eu"; Charlie Brown Jr. – "Champanhe e Água Benta"; Cidade Negra – "Perto de Deus"; Dead Fish – "Queda Livre"; Detonautas – "Tênis Roque"; Ira! and Pitty – "Eu Quero Sempre Mais"; Jota Quest – "Além do Horizonte"; KLB – "Carolina"; Ludov – "Kriptonita"; Marcelo D2 – "1967"; O Rappa – "Mar de Gente"; Pitty – "Semana Que Vem"; Sandy & Junior – "Nada Vai Me Sufocar"; Tihuana – "Renata"; Titãs – "Vou Duvidar"; Wanessa Camargo – "Metade de Mim" | **Leela – "Te Procuro"**; Black Alien – "Babylon by Gus"; F.UR.T.O. – "Não Se Preocupe Comigo"; Nervoso – "Já Desmanchei Minha Relação"; Trêmula – "Selvagens Procurando Lei" |
| Best Pop Video | Best MPB Video |
| **Gabriel, o Pensador – "Palavras Repetidas"**; Ludov – "Kriptonita"; Nando Reis and Os Infernais – "O Mundo É Bão, Sebastião!"; Pato Fu – "Anormal"; Sandy & Junior – "Nada Vai Me Sufocar" | **Marcelo D2 – "A Maldição do Samba"**; Arnaldo Antunes – "Saiba"; Bid and Elza Soares – "Mandingueira"; Los Hermanos – "O Vento"; Sidney Magal – "Tenho" |
| Best Rock Video | Best Rap Video |
| **CPM 22 – "Irreversível"**; Cachorro Grande – "Você Não Sabe o que Perdeu"; Charlie Brown Jr. – "Champanhe e Água Benta"; Ira! – "Flerte Fatal"; Pitty – "Anacrônico" | **Helião and Negra Li – "Exército do Rap"**; Black Alien – "Babylon by Gus"; Da Guedes – "Jornada"; Rappin' Hood – "Us Guerreiro"; Thaíde – "Caboclinho Comum" |
| Best Electronic Video | Best International Video |
| **Marcelinho da Lua – "Refazenda"**; Anderson Noise – "Homem Cachorro"; DJ Ramilson Maia and Pato Banton – "Macuna"; Freakplasma – "The Ride"; Sonic Jr. – "Pulsar" | **System of a Down – "B.Y.O.B."**; Avril Lavigne – "He Wasn't"; Backstreet Boys – "Incomplete"; Britney Spears – "Do Somethin'"; Destiny's Child – "Lose My Breath"; Green Day – "Boulevard of Broken Dreams"; Good Charlotte – "I Just Wanna Live"; Hanson – "Penny & Me"; Linkin Park and Jay-Z – "Jigga What, Jigga Who"/Faint"; Maroon 5 – "This Love" |
| Best Independent Video | Best Artist Website |
| **Autoramas – "Você Sabe"**; Astronautas – "Cidade Cinza"; Jumbo Elektro – "Freak Cat"; Rock Rocket – "Puro Amor em Alto Mar"; Wander Wildner – "Hippie-Punk-Rajnesh" | **Moptop (moptop.com.br)**; Bidê ou Balde (bideoubalde.com.br); CPM 22 (cpm22.com.br); Marcelo D2 (marcelod2.com.br); Pato Fu (patofu.com.br) |
| Best Live Performance | Best Direction in a Video |
| **Ira! and Pitty – "Eu Quero Sempre Mais"**; Detonautas – "Tênis Roque"; Kid Abelha – "Poligamia"; Nando Reis and Os Infernais – "Do Seu Lado"; Ultramen and Falcão – "Dívida" | **Autoramas – "Você Sabe" (Director: Luis Carone)**; Charlie Brown Jr. – "Champanhe e Água Benta" (Directors: Roberto Oliveira and Alex Miranda); Ira! – "Flerte Fatal" (Director: Selton Mello); Nando Reis and Os Infernais – "O Mundo É Bão, Sebastião!" (Directors: Doca Corbert, Binho Jr., Titi Freak and Whip); Pato Fu – "Anormal" (Director: Jarbas Agnelli) |
| Best Art Direction in a Video | Best Editing in a Video |
| **Pato Fu – "Anormal" (Art Directors: Jarbas Agnelli and Tomas Duque Estrada)**; Autoramas – "Você Sabe" (Art Director: Luis Carone); Ira! – "Flerte Fatal" (Art Directors: Marcelo Vindicatto, Emilio Orsiollo Neto and Hossen Minussi); Nando Reis and Os Infernais – "O Mundo É Bão, Sebastião!" (Art Directors: Doca Corbett and Binho Jr.); Sandy & Junior – "Nada Vai Me Sufocar" (Art Director: Romeo Fasce) | **Autoramas – "Você Sabe" (Editors: Luis Carone and Rodrigo Menecucci)**; Charlie Brown Jr. – "Champanhe e Água Benta" (Editor: Carlos Milanez Pans); F.UR.T.O. – "Não Se Preocupe Comigo" (Editors: Nobuyuki Ogata and Sérgio Mecler); Nando Reis and Os Infernais – "O Mundo É Bão, Sebastião!" (Editors: Doca Corbett and Binho Jr.); Pato Fu – "Anormal" (Editor: Jarbas Agnelli) |
| Best Cinematography in a Video | Dream Band |
| **Gabriel, o Pensador – "Palavras Repetidas" (Director of Photography: Marcelo Trotta)**; Autoramas – "Você Sabe" (Director of Photography: Lula Maluf); Bid and Elza Soares – "Mandingueira" (Director of Photography: Mariana Jorge); Ira! – "Flerte Fatal" (Director of Photography: Juarez Pavelak); Ludov – "Kriptonita" (Director of Photography: Eduardo Kurt) | **Pitty (vocals)**; **Edgard Scandurra (guitar)**; **Champignon (bass)**; **Ricardo Japinha (drums)** |
MTV Idol
**Pitty**
