= Enquanto Houver Sol =

2004 single by Titãs

Single by Titãs

from the album Como Estão Vocês?
- Released: 2004
- Genre: Rock
- Length: 3:02
- Label: BMG
- Songwriter(s): Sérgio Britto
- Producer(s): Liminha

Titãs singles chronology
"O Mundo é Bão, Sebastião!" (2002)	"Enquanto Houver Sol" (2004)	"Provas de Amor" (2004)

"Enquanto Houver Sol" is the seventeenth single by Titãs, released in 2004. The song was featured on the 2002 Rede Globo telenovela Celebridade. Malu Mader, Tony Bellotto's wife, starred as the main character. According to ABPD, it was among the 10 most played songs on the radio in 2004.

When asked if the song was inspired by "Epitáfio", the main hit from their previous record, songwriter, vocalist and keyboardist Sérgio Britto said:

I always compose songs like this, by the piano, with a very strong melodic part. For years they had no space on Titãs."Enquanto Houver Sol" reminds of "Go Back", although I did not compose that one on the piano. It wasn't something planned, you cannot determine success, anyway. "Epitáfio" was the second most played song last year. When you try to repeat, it usually goes wrong.

In the music video for this song, the band members are seen among the dark, with images being displayed on their shirts.

== Titãs Trio Acústico version ==
"Enquanto Houver Sol"

Single by Titãs

from the album Titãs Trio Acústico
- Released: 11 June 2020
- Genre: Acoustic rock
- Length: 3:33
- Label: BMG Rights Management
- Songwriter(s): Sérgio Britto

Titãs singles chronology
"Sonífera Ilha (Trio Acústico)" (2020)	"Enquanto Houver Sol" (2020)	"Pra Dizer Adeus (Trio Acústico)" (2020)

In 2020, the band, then reduced to a trio (Branco Mello on vocals, acoustic guitar and bass; Sérgio Britto on vocal, keyboards and bass; and Tony Bellotto on vocals, acoustic and electric guitar, re-recorded the track as part of their Titãs Trio Acústico project.

The version received a video directed by Otávio Juliano and Luciana Ferraz and produced by Interface Filmes. In the video, puppets imitating the members perform the song. The puppets were created by Virgílio Zago and Guilherme Pires.
