= Smoking companion set =

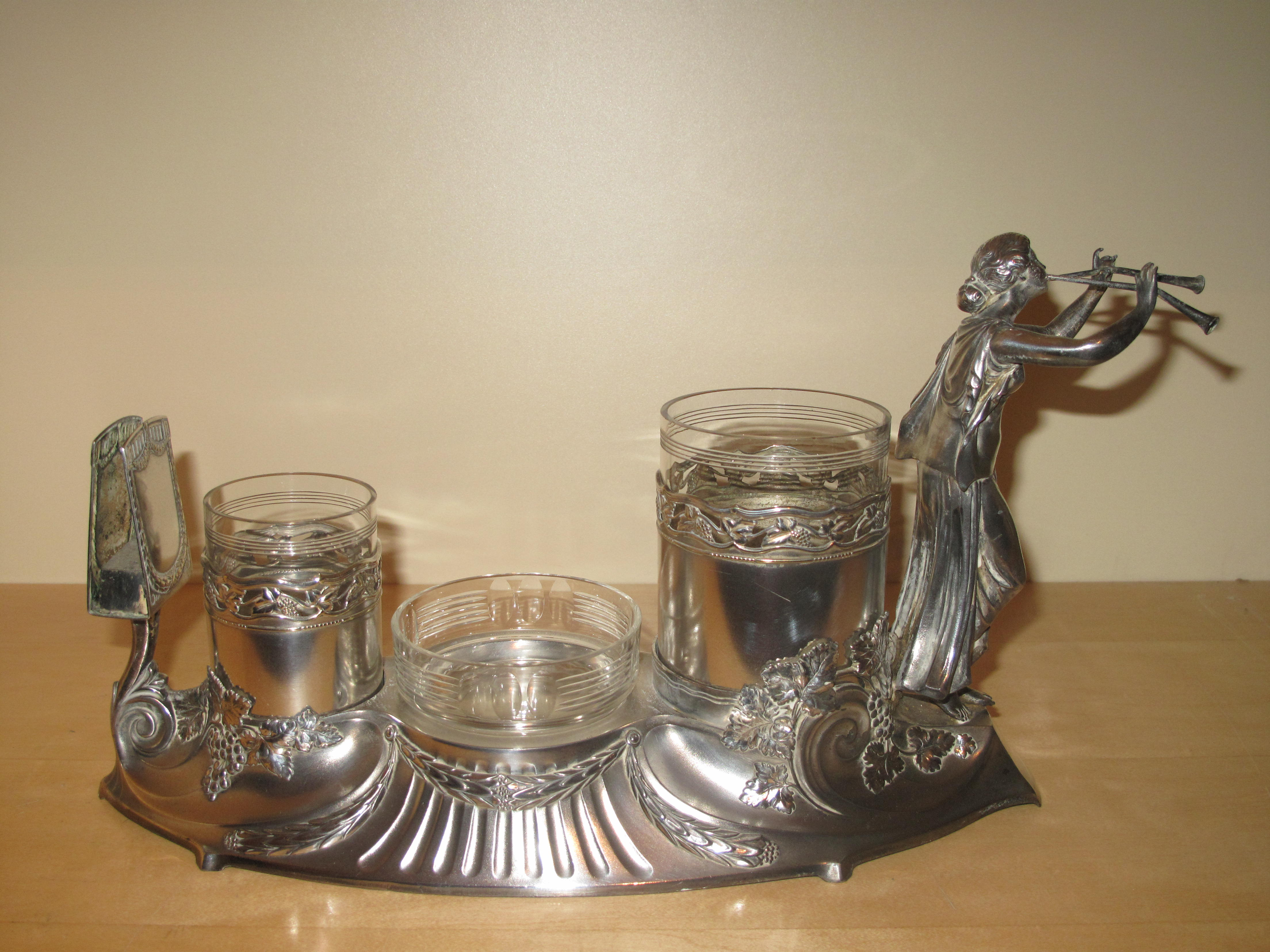
French smoking companion set in "Art Nouveau" style.

A smoking companion set or smoke set, is an object both decorative and useful. It has compartments for cigars, cigarettes, matches, ashtrays and burned matches.

They were popular in Europe circa 1900.
