= Provas de Amor =

Single by Titãs

from the album Como Estão Vocês?
- Released: 2004
- Genre: Rock
- Label: BMG
- Songwriter(s): Paulo Miklos
- Producer(s): Liminha

Titãs singles chronology
"Enquanto Houver Sol" (2004)	"Provas de Amor" (2004)	"Vossa Excelência" (2005)

"Provas de Amor" is the eighteenth single by Titãs, released in 2004. The song was featured on the 2004 Rede Globo telenovela Como uma Onda. Written by vocalist/guitarist Paulo Miklos, it questions the existence of love.

The music video, directed by Oscar Rodrigues Alves, features the band performing in the Cardeal Arcoverde Subway Station in Rio de Janeiro while certain psychological aspects of the passengers are unfolded. It premiered on MTV Brasil on June 30, 2004.

== Track listing ==
No.	Title	Music	Length
1.	"Provas de Amor"	Paulo Miklos	3:22
