= A Melhor Banda de Todos os Tempos da Última Semana (song) =

2001 song by Titãs

Single by Titãs

from the album A Melhor Banda de Todos os Tempos da Última Semana
- Released: 2001
- Genre: Pop Rock, Ska
- Length: 3:04
- Label: Abril Music
- Producer(s): Jack Endino

Titãs singles chronology
"Aluga-se" (2000)	"A Melhor Banda de Todos os Tempos da Última Semana" (2001)	"Epitáfio" (2002)

Music video
- A Melhor Banda de Todos os Tempos da Última Semana on YouTube

"A Melhor Banda de Todos os Tempos da Última Semana" (Portuguese for "The Best Band of All Time Of The Last Weekend") is a single by the Brazilian rock band Titãs, released in 2002. It was released as the fourteenth single by the band and the first from the 2001 album of the same name. Because of the way that this song was written, its lyrics are often used in tests and academic study.

== Music video ==
The song's music video shows black & white images of the band in several situations. Branco Mello sings while having his hair cut, with Paulo Miklos sitting near him and holding a cigarette. Nando Reis is seen in a kind of food fair, and Charles Gavin visits a music store.

== Personnel ==
Personnel per album booklet:

- Titãs – claps
- Branco Mello – lead vocals
- Paulo Miklos – harmonica
- Sérgio Britto – backing vocals
- Tony Bellotto - twelve-string guitar
- Charles Gavin – drums; sound technician
- Jack Endino – electric guitar
- Armando Marçal – percussion
- Paul Ralphes – claps
