= Como Estão Vocês? =

Studio album by Titãs
- Released: 2003
- Recorded: From June 16 to September 21, 2003
- Genres: Alternative rock, pop rock
- Length: 44:33
- Label: BMG
- Producer: Liminha

Titãs chronology
| A Melhor Banda de Todos os Tempos da Última Semana (2001) | Como Estão Vocês? (2003) | MTV ao Vivo (2005) |

Singles from Como Estão Vocês?
- 1. "Enquanto Houver Sol" Released: 2004; 2. "Provas de Amor" Released: 2004

Como Estão Vocês? (Portuguese for "How Are You?") is the twelfth studio album released by Brazilian rock band Titãs. It was the first album by the band without vocalist/bassist Nando Reis and also the first without any contribution by guitarist Marcelo Fromer. Fromer died after being hit by a motorcycle on 11 June 2001, but his ideas were still used for their then upcoming album A Melhor Banda de Todos os Tempos da Última Semana which would be recorded a few days later. Reis left the group in 2002 stating he wasn't prepared to record another album due to still being shaken by the deaths of both Fromer and his friend Cássia Eller. It is also their first release via BMG, following Abril Music's bankrupt.

== Background and concept ==
Commenting on the absence of Fromer and Reis, vocalist/keyboardist Sérgio Britto said he believed the band "could compensate these absences. I'm not gonna say they are not missed, but we can make good albums with this personnel. Each one has potentialities - one plays the guitar, the other plays the bass, the other plays the drums and everyone composes." Guitarist Tony Bellotto and vocalist Paulo Miklos also commented at that time about the band's capability of getting over the line-up losses.

The name of the album was inspired by Confucius, via an idea that he used to support: "I asked with fire letters. How are you? How are all of us? The path is lost, we should judge." According to Britto, "it could be how's the country, could be what we [the band] are going through. It's a simple title, with an open and interesting meaning".

Its cover, created by notorious artist Rogério Duarte, was explained by him in an interview for Correio Braziliense: "I thought of a tropicalist language, against that smooth thing, viewed as of fine taste. And a language that carried those references to the current government, to socialism, to MST. The red color even serves as criticism to the green and yellow". He commented further on the work in another interview, this time for Folha de S.Paulo:

I'm not saying red is directly PT, although I think Brazil goes through a moment that deserves such citation. Representing blood and flesh, the red also criticizes the green-yellow. There was resistance by some of them regarding this hard, brutal thing about green-yellow. I had to act like a star, almost a black hole with some flashes of ego. I said if they called me, they would have to take me. I wasn't there to choose which titã looked best on the picture.

== Song themes ==
When asked about the possibility of the opening track "Nós Estamos Bem" (We Are Fine) being a message to the fans and the press, Britto said "yes, could be. But in the song we ask "how are you", and this can be understood in a wider sense. How is Brazil, how are the things through which we are going through. This sentence defines the intention of the album".

The song "Enquanto Houver Sol" was included in the soundtrack of the 2003 Rede Globo telenovela Celebridade, which had Bellotto's wife Malu Mader in the lead role. The song "Pelo Avesso" was also used in another Rede Globo telenovela, 2009's Cama de Gato, appearing as the opening theme.

"KGB" talks about fear for the return of torturers and extremists of KGB, Dops, CIA, Ku Klux Klan, Third Reich, etc. "As Aventuras do Guitarrista Gourmet Atrás da Refeição Ideal" marks the second consecutive time an album by the band brings a tribute to Fromer.

== Track listing ==
| No. | Title | Lyrics | Lead vocals | Length |
|---|---|---|---|---|
| 1. | "Nós Estamos Bem" (We Are Fine) | Sérgio Britto, Paulo Miklos | Miklos | 2:27 |
| 2. | "Você é Minha" (You Are Mine) | Sérgio Britto, Charles Gavin, Branco Mello, Tony Bellotto, Miklos | Britto | 2:46 |
| 3. | "Gina Superstar" | Mello, Bellotto | Mello | 2:30 |
| 4. | "KGB" | Britto, Miklos | Miklos | 3:44 |
| 5. | "Livres Para Escolher" (Free to Choose) | Britto, Bellotto | Britto | 3:43 |
| 6. | "Eu Não Sou um Bom Lugar" (I Am Not a Good Place) | Bellotto, Mello | Mello | 2:45 |
| 7. | "Pra Você Ficar" (For You to Stay) | Bellotto | Miklos | 2:58 |
| 8. | "Enquanto Houver Sol" (As Long as There's Sun) | Britto | Britto | 3:02 |
| 9. | "Esperando Para Atravessar a Rua" (Waiting to Cross the Street) | Arnaldo Antunes, Mello, Bellotto | Mello | 3:11 |
| 10. | "Provas de Amor" (Love Proofs) | Miklos | Miklos | 3:22 |
| 11. | "Ser Estranho" (Strange Being) | Bellotto, Mello | Mello | 3:12 |
| 12. | "Vou Duvidar" (I'll Doubt It) | Britto | Britto | 2:12 |
| 13. | "Pelo Avesso" (Inside Out) | Britto | Britto | 2:42 |
| 14. | "A Guerra é Aqui" (The War Is Here) | Miklos, Mello, Bellotto, Gavin | Mello | 3:14 |
| 15. | "As Aventuras do Guitarrista Gourmet Atrás da Refeição Ideal" (The Adventures of Gourmet Guitarist After the Ideal Meal) | Bellotto, Miklos | Miklos | 2:45 |

== Reception ==
Professional ratings
Review scores
| Source | Rating |
|---|---|
| Allmusic | 3.5/5 stars |
| Folha de S.Paulo | 3/5 stars |

Philip Jandovský, from AllMusic, said the album is a return to rock from albums like Cabeça Dinossauro and considered "impressive how Titãs manage to maintain a good quality, even after all these years and especially after high-profile bandmembers like Arnaldo Antunes and Nando Reis left the group". He also said fans would hardly be disappointed by the album, even though it was "far from reaching the vibrant energy of the glory days of the band".

Pedro Alexandre Sanches, from Folha de S.Paulo, compared the album to the band's sophomore Televisão for mixing different tracks like the ironic and "classy punk rock" "A Guerra É Aqui" with the optimistic and "loose pop rock" "Livres para Escolher". He also said the band came off unaltered by the exit of Nando Reis, whom he considered a "estraged body" in the band.

== Personnel ==
According to the CD booklet:

=== Titãs ===
- Branco Mello - lead vocals on tracks 3, 6, 9, 11 and 14; backing vocals on all tracks except 10, 15 and the ones in which he does lead vocals
- Paulo Miklos - lead vocals on tracks 1, 4, 7, 10 and 15; backing vocals on all tracks except the ones in which he does lead vocals
- Sérgio Britto - lead vocals on tracks 2, 5, 8, 12 and 13; backing vocals on all tracks except 15 and the ones in which he does lead vocals; piano on tracks 2, 5, 7, 8 and 13; electric piano on track 4; keyboard on tracks 8, 10, 14 and 15; Hammond on tracks 9, 10 and 11; Moog on track 10
- Tony Bellotto - electric guitar on all tracks except 6 and 13; lead guitar on track 2; acoustic guitar on tracks 5, 6 and 13; twelve-string electric guitar on tracks 11 and 15
- Charles Gavin - drums on all tracks except 15

=== Session members ===
- Emerson Villani - electric guitar on all tracks except 6 and 13; twelve-string electric guitar on track 4; acoustic guitar on tracks 6 and 13; dobro on tracks 6 and 8; lead guitar on track 9; baritone guitar on tracks 10 and 11
- Lee Marcucci - electric bass on all tracks
- Marco Lobo - percussion on all tracks except 6, 10, 12 and 15
- Liminha - electric guitar and dobro with EBow on track 8; acoustic bass on the introduction of track 13

=== Technical personnel ===
- Conceived by Titãs and arranged by Branco Mello, Charles Gavin, Paulo Miklos, Sergio Britto, Tony Bellotto, Emerson Villani and Lee Marcucci
- Production - Liminha
- Artistic direction - Sérgio de Carvalho
- BMG artistic direction - Sergio Bittencourt
- Recording engineering - Vitor Farias, Liminha and Enrico de Paoli
- Additional engineers - Julius César, Daniel Farias and Javier Naszewski
- Studio assistants - Marcelo Tapajós
- Mixing - Vitor Farias, Liminha and Titãs; except tracks 1, 11, 12 and 13, mixed by Enrico de Paoli, Liminha and Titãs; and "Eu Não Sou um Bom Lugar", mixed by Brad Gilderman
- Mastering - Ricardo Garcia, Magic Master
- Graphic project - Rogério Duarte e Rogério Duarte Filho
- Graphic coordination - Emil Ferreira
- Photography - Daniela Dacorso
- Costume design - Patrícia Zuffa
- Costume design assistant - Gustavo
- Catering - Solange Ramos
- Executive production - Nelson Damascena
- Roadie - Frederico Fonseca
