= Zone Fam =

Zambian musical group

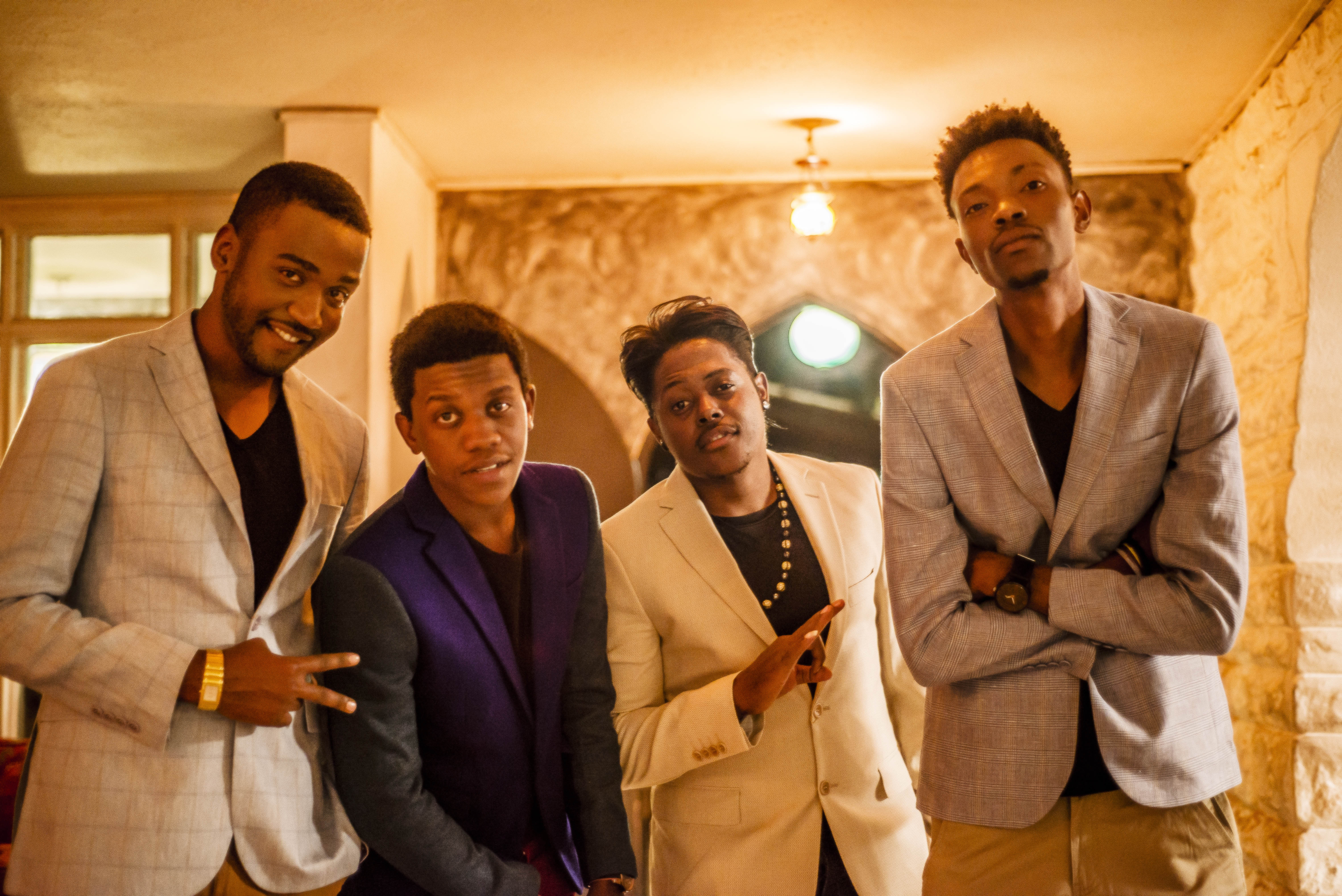
- Zone Fam in 2013 shooting Translate

Background information
- Origin: Lusaka, Zambia
- Genres: Alternative hip hop, R&B & pop
- Years active: 2009–present
- Labels: Slam Dunk Records
- Members: Holstar, Jay Rox, Yung Verbal, Dope G
- Past members: MAK, Al Kan-I, Thugga

Zone Fam was a Zambian hip hop supergroup based in Lusaka, composed of Sam Sakala (Dope G), Jackson Banda (Jay Rox), Reginald Lube (Yung Verbal), and previously Timbwama Chisenga (FKA Thugga now known as Tim) until his departure from the group on April 1, 2015. It was a collective of solo artists that frequented "Zone Studios" started by Duncan Sodala also known as Holstar and Kati Kawanu in 2006. Zone Fam Officially became a Rap group in 2009 after recording "The Full Script" Mixtape with Nigerian producer Teck-zilla. They gained popularity after the release of their debut album single Shaka Zulu On Em which received nationwide airplay, topping radio charts and got worldwide reviews off YouTube. In 2011 they went on and released their first studio album, The Business: Foreign Exchange, which was the bestseller of that year. In 2012, Zone Fam signed their first international deal under record label Taurus Musik of Kenya, which helped them produce songs several songs and visuals namely, Translate, "Da Bidness" and Contolola, which won them a Channel O Award at the Channel O Music Video Awards for Best Group. They also have to their name the award for Best African Group at the Global African Music Awards. The group is currently disbanded and was managed by Duncan Sodala between 2009 and 2014 - He also manages the Zone Fam brand.

== Musical style ==
The majority of Zone Fam songs incorporate hip hop and contemporary R&B. However, their rap is a combination of English, Bemba Nyanja and Zulu languages.

== Current members ==
- Holstar (Duncan Sodala) Founding member and Manager
- Dope G (Sam Sakala)
- Jay Rox (Jackson Banda)
- Yung Verbal (Reginald Lube)

== Past members ==
- MAK (born Monde Kawana)
- Al Kan-I (born Mutale Kani)
- Thugga (born Tim Chisenga)

== Discography ==
- The Full Script (Mixtape) (2010)
- The Business: Foreign Exchange (2011)
