= Epitáfio =

Single by Titãs

from the album A Melhor Banda de Todos os Tempos da Última Semana
- B-side: "Epitáfio" (acoustic version)
- Released: 2002
- Genre: Alternative rock, soft rock
- Label: Abril Music
- Songwriter: Sérgio Britto
- Producer: Jack Endino

Titãs singles chronology
"'A Melhor Banda de Todos os Tempos da Última Semana'" (2001)	"Epitáfio" (2002)	"'O Mundo é Bão, Sebastião!'" (2002)

Music video
- Epitáfio on YouTube

"Epitáfio" is the fifteenth single by Titãs, released in 2002. It was included in the soundtrack of telenovela Desejos de Mulher. As a B-side, the single featured an acoustic version of the song. Unlike the whole band, producer Jack Endino believed it could be a hit and was eventually proven right.

The music video, featuring archive footage of the Titãs in their daily lives, won three awards at the MTV Video Music Brasil, including Viewer's Choice and Video of the Year.

In December 2014, by request of TV program Fantástico, the band recorded a new version of the track with verses suggested by the program's spectators. Each suggestion described something the person felt they should have done less in 2014 or that they intend to do more in 2015, keeping the original logic of the single.

== Track listing ==
#	Title	Length	Music
1	Epitáfio ("Epitaph")	2:56	Sérgio Britto

== Accolades ==
Awards and nominations for "Epitáfio"
Organization	Year	Category	Result	Ref.
MTV Video Music Brasil	2002	Music Video of the Year	Won	
MTV Video Music Brasil	2002	Viewer's Choice	Won	
MTV Video Music Brasil	2002	Rock Music Video	Won	
MTV Video Music Brasil	2002	Direção em Videoclipe	Nominated	
Troféu Imprensa	2003	Best Song	Nominated	

== Cover versions ==
- Gal Costa on her 2002 album Gal Bossa Tropical
- Kiloucura on their 2003 album Kiloucura ao vivo
- Flávio Carvalho on his album Pra Te Enlouquecer
- Tim (from Xutos & Pontapés) on his 2006 solo album Um e o Outro
- Liv Moraes on her 2006 album Liv Moraes
- Fábio Jr on his 2008 compilation album Minha História
- Nasi (ex-Ira!) for the 2008 Rede Record telenovela Chamas da Vida
