= A Melhor Banda de Todos os Tempos da Última Semana =

Studio album by Titãs
- Released: October 2001
- Recorded: From 11 June to 11 August 2001 at Ar Studios, Rio de Janeiro
- Genre: Alternative rock
- Length: 49:52
- Label: Abril Music
- Producer: Jack Endino

Titãs chronology
Titãs & Paralamas Juntos ao Vivo (1999)	A Melhor Banda de Todos os Tempos da Última Semana (2001)	Como Estão Vocês? (2003)

Singles from A Melhor Banda de Todos os Tempos da Última Semana
- 1. "A Melhor Banda de Todos os Tempos da Última Semana" Released: 2001; 2. "Isso" Released: 2001; 3. "Epitáfio" Released: 2002; 4. "O Mundo É Bão, Sebastião!" Released: 2002

A Melhor Banda de Todos os Tempos da Última Semana (Last Week's Best Band Ever) is the eleventh studio album released by Brazilian rock band Titãs. It is the first album composed entirely of new material since 1995's Domingo; the first (and only) released via Abril Music following the end of the partnership they had with WEA since the band's debut; the first without founding member and guitarist Marcelo Fromer, who died just before the recording sessions (and to whom the album is dedicated); the last featuring founding member, vocalist and bassist Nando Reis, who would leave the band after the album's release to focus on his solo career, and the last produced by Jack Endino.

Fromer's death almost prompted the remaining members to postpone the album's recording and even made them consider ending the band, but the then sextet decided to carry on, deducing it would be what the guitarist wanted if alive. While the album's title criticizes "superficial" lists compiled by the press, the album's lyrics deal with various themes – including death, despite the songwriting taking place before the musician's passing.

The album was written under pressure from fans and critics, who saw the band release three albums mostly consisting of covers or re-recordings (Acústico MTV, Volume Dois and As Dez Mais). A Melhor Banda de Todos os Tempos da Última Semana received mostly positive reviews, but did not sell as well as its three predecessors.

== Background ==
This is the first album since Domingo (1995) to contain only new songs. Previously, the band had released Acústico MTV, with acoustic versions of some of their songs and four new ones; Volume Dois, a studio effort that continued the acoustic concept and brought more new tracks; and As Dez Mais, a tribute album. While Reis commented he did not notice such a long interval, vocalist Branco Mello and vocalist/keyboardist Sérgio Britto considered it a period of great experience. Titãs were experiencing pressure from critics due to the long period with little new material, especially after three members (Britto, Reis and vocalist Paulo Miklos) released solo albums in the period (respectively: A Minha Cara, Para Quando o Arco-Íris Encontrar o Pote de Ouro and Vou Ser Feliz e Já Volto). Due to that, some members considered releasing an album the only choice they had at a comeback.

According to Alexandre Negado, from Omelete, the band announced a DJ would perform on the album, beginning an electronic foray for the band, but the idea was ultimately abandoned.

On 11 June, a couple of days before they started the recording sessions, guitarist Marcelo Fromer was struck by a motorcycle in São Paulo and taken to the hospital with severe injuries. He died two days later. Instead of interrupting the recording sessions, the remaining band members decided to carry on with it and record the album by the deadline they set. Drummer Charles Gavin said at the time that "stopping would have been much worse for us, we would have been depressed, isolated". In 2013, after singer Chorão from Charlie Brown Jr. died, Mello said the band decided to carry on back in 2001 to keep alive Fromer's (and their) dream of having a rock band.

When commenting on the impact of his death during the recording sessions, American producer Jack Endino said:

We lost Marcelo on the first day of recording, which simply destroyed everyone. All work stopped. It looked like the whole world had stopped. But after a week Titãs decided they had to carry on. The best way of dealing with the tragedy was to work very hard. That's what Marcelo would have told us to do, and everyone knew that. But it was hard under those conditions. For me, particularly, one of the reasons was that I played so many of Marcelo’s guitar parts. The more rock parts. I had watched all the sessions, I knew the songs and how Marcelo played them. It was very odd to do that. Normally I don't like playing on albums I'm producing, but that seemed to be something that I had to do. Tony [Bellotto, guitarist] didn't want to play Marcelo's parts. He and Charles said: 'Jack, if there was a time for you to play with us, now is the time. They didn't want an outsider playing Marcelo's parts. (...) I had to be very careful for it to sound like Titãs, and not like me.

It was only during the recording sessions that the band truly absorbed the member's death. According to Miklos, "we were so focused on recording and resuming the project that we did not think before. Now that we had reunited for a few sessions, we were realizing it", he said by the time of the album's release. He would recall that time in a 2013 interview:

Again, we saw ourselves in the same situation: 'what should we do now? Let's stop. No, let's not stop, let's make this album that he made with us. Let's record it'. We got into the studio and it was a moment of unity, in which you are there for one another. It was that which moved us in that moment. Today it's the heritage that we have.

== Production and recording ==
The album was pre-produced at Estúdio Vinil Junkie, in São Paulo, in Abril and May 2001.

Endino took part in the album as an instrumentalist, playing Fromer's guitar parts (musician Emerson Villani, who was a Titãs session member, also recorded some parts), and also handled the bass on some tracks by the request of Reis, so that he could focus on the acoustic guitar. The band thought about using some recordings of Fromer for the album, but they lacked the necessary quality.

Endino also had to face another death during the sessions: his father's, at age 84. The passing forced him to go back to Seattle, United States, for a week, a period in which he was replaced by Paul Ralphes, who produced Britto's debut solo album.

Mixing took place in X Studio in Seattle, between 16 August and 2 September 2001, by Endino and Titãs. Mastering happened on 4 September 2001 at Sterling Sound, in New York City, United States. For this stage, Gavin travelled to the American city – while he was there, the September 11 attacks occurred. The album was then finished in Seattle by Endino and some members of the band.

== Concept, composition and lyrics ==
The album title, as well as the title-track, are a play with "best" lists that the press "shove down the public's throat", despite the band admitting to be part of that. It also criticizes the superficiality shown by music at the time, music made to be "consumed"; but the criticism was expressed in a "ironic" and "sarcastic" way.

40 songs were composed for the album and 16 made it to the final tracklist. Fromer co-wrote five of them. There are tracks written by multiple members and tracks written by only one.

Despite some of the lyrics dealing with death ("Epitáfio" and "Um Morto de Férias", for example), they were all composed before the accident. Tony Bellotto says the tracks reflected the moment lived by Fromer at the time, "going through a personal, individual crisis. He was about to turn 40, such questions were natural". Indeed, "Um Morto de Férias" was taken by Pedro Alexandre Sanches, of Folha de S.Paulo, as a reference to mid-life crisis. When asked about an alleged teenage thematic in the lyrics, Britto replied that "to feel detached, with difficulties to adapt to the routine, is not a privilege of teenagers. This is something that we can have our whole life. You can be a father and not feel part of it". "Daqui Pra Lá" was inspired by the song "O Homem Que Deve Morrer" (The Man Who Must Die), composed by Nonato Buzar and written by Torquato Neto.

In terms of sound, some critics saw a return to the band's heavier sound of the past. Negado, from Omelete, defined the album's sound as "basic pop rock". While some considered that "Um Morto de Férias" and "É Bom Desconfiar" had a radiophonic pop appeal, "Vamos ao Trabalho" flirts with punk and "Eu Não Presto" borrows elemens from ska; "Mesmo Sozinho" is a melancholic ballad and forms a couple with the other ballad os the album, "Isso". "O Mundo É Bão, Sebastião!" opens with a chord reminiscent of The Beatles' "Day Tripper". "Bananas" was defined as "funk-samba-rock" and "mangue beat" and "Vamos ao Trabalho" was compared to Cabeça Dinossauro-era songs.

Endino described A Melhor Banda de Todos os Tempos da Última Semana as follows:

[The album] is a compact of everything Titãs can do. We wanted it at the band's old sound, sounding like a real band playing together again. Charles and I got the rock songs really sounding like rock. Reis and I worked more than ever to make his songs work as Titãs songs. "A Melhor Banda" was one of the most difficult albums I ever produced, in a terrible year, but I felt we finally did an album by Titãs sounding like a rock band again.

== Release and reception ==
A Melhor Banda de Todos os Tempos da Última Semana marks the first (and only) release by Titãs under Abril Music, which would close its doors less than two years later. The first 250,000 copies of the album were sold in newsstands in a package including a poster-magazine with stories, a graphic novel, trivia and games featuring the band. The idea came from the then president of the label, Marcos Mainardi, who intended to increase the CD's availability and decrease its price. The magazine format was adopted to evade a law that prohibited CDs from being sold in newsstands as individual products, but not as part of a bundle. The suggested price for it at the newsstands was R$19,90.

=== Commercial reception ===
The album was certified gold by ABPD in 2001, which meant 100,000 copies sold according to the criteria of the time. It wasn't as successful as most of Titãs' previous releases.

=== Critical reception ===
Professional ratings
Review scores
Source	Rating
AllMusic	3.5/5 stars
ISTOÉ	Favorable
Omelete	Favorable
Folha de S.Paulo	3/5 stars

A Melhor Banda de Todos os Tempos da Última Semana received positive reviews by the critics.

Writing for AllMusic, Philip Jandovský stated that Titãs manages "to maintain a surprisingly high standard of rock music", classifying the album as solid, even if not considering it as inspired and creative as the first phase of the band, which he called "one of Brazil's most talented and interesting rock bands".

Apoenan Rodrigues, from ISTOÉ magazine, considered the album "fun" and "ironic starting with the title itself, [...] It makes the perfect mixture of palatable pop of more recent works like the acoustic projects and the sonic tons of Titanomaquia". He concluded by saying "the good sense mixed with the humour resulted in a CD for rocker parents and children."

Alexandre Nagado, from Omelete, considered that the album's 16 tracks "show a group that already took itself too seriously and is now trying to get back on a simple path" and concluded his analysis saying that "the lyrics and melodies wander from rock to brega with a tranquility that will infuriate radical critics that are always saying Titãs are not the same anymore or that that which they do is disposable and commercial pop and not pure rock."

Pedro Alexandre Sanches, from Folha de S.Paulo, says the lyrics range from autocriticism to references to the so-called "mid-life crisis" and concluded by saying: "for the ones who forgot about this, Titãs are still capable of doing open, new and creative music." In a general comment about the band's discography, Cleber Facchi, from Miojo Indie, said "a considerable part of the album fuses the commercial side of the group with the sarcasm assumed since the 80s."

== Track listing ==
No.	Title	Lyrics	Lead vocals	Length
1.	"Vamos ao Trabalho" (Let's Go to Work)	Paulo Miklos	Miklos	1:52
2.	"A Melhor Banda de Todos os Tempos da Última Semana" (Last Week's Greatest Band of All Time)	Sérgio Britto, Branco Mello	Mello	3:05
3.	"O Mundo é Bão, Sebastião!" (The World is Good, Sebastião! (Bão is "good" in the Brazilian hillbilly dialect))	Nando Reis	Reis	4:15
4.	"Bom Gosto" (Good Taste)	Marcelo Fromer, Tony Bellotto and Britto	Britto	3:44
5.	"Um Morto de Férias" (Dead Man on Vacation)	Fromer, Bellotto and Britto	Mello	3:21
6.	"Epitáfio" (Epitaph)	Britto	Britto	2:56
7.	"É Bom Desconfiar" (Better Distrust)	Reis	Reis	3:27
8.	"Não Fuja da Dor" (Don't Run Away from the Pain)	Fromer, Charles Gavin, Mello, Bellotto	Mello	3:34
9.	"Daqui Pra Lá" (From Here to There)	Britto and Torquato Neto	Britto	3:23
10.	"Isso" (This)	Bellotto	Miklos	2:40
11.	"Eu Não Presto" (I Suck)	Mello and Ciro Pessoa	Mello	2:28
12.	"Mundo Cão" (Dog World)	Britto	Britto	2:59
13.	"Mesmo Sozinho" (Even Alone)	Reis	Reis	4:29
14.	"Bananas"	Britto, Miklos and Gavin	Miklos	2:32
15.	"Alma Lavada" (Washed Soul)	Fromer, Gavin, Mello, Bellotto, Britto	Mello	2:32
16.	"Cuidado Com Você" (Be Careful With Yourself)	Fromer, Miklos, Bellotto, Arnaldo Antunes	Miklos	1:53

== Personnel ==
Personnel per album booklet:

=== Titãs ===
- Titãs – claps on track 2
- Branco Mello – lead vocals on tracks 2, 5, 8, 11 and 15; backing vocals on tracks 1, 5, 10, 15 and 16
- Paulo Miklos – lead vocals on tracks 1, 10, 14 and 16; backing vocals on all tracks except 7, 10, 15 and 16; harmonica on track 2; flute on track 7; acoustic guitar on track 14
- Nando Reis – lead vocals on tracks 3, 7 and 13; backing vocals on tracks 3, 7 and 13; bass on all tracks except 6–8 and 11; acoustic guitar on tracks 3, 7, 8, 13 and 14; vase and ashtray on track 7
- Sérgio Britto – lead vocals on 4, 6, 9 and 12; backing vocals on all tracks except 6, 7 and 11–13; keyboards on track 1; Fender Rhodes on tracks 3, 5, 6, 13 and 14; Hammond on tracks 4, 7 and 10; virus on tracks 5, 8 and 9; clavinet on track 7; Mellotron on track 9; piano on track 16
- Tony Bellotto – electric guitar on all tracks except 2–4, 6, 9, 12 and 14; acoustic guitar on tracks 1, 5 and 10; six and twelve-string guitar on tracks 2, 3, 6 and 9 (just the twelve-string on the latter); wah wah guitar on tracks 4, 12 and 14; slide guitar on tracks 9 and 15
- Charles Gavin – drums on all tracks; pandeiro on tracks 3 and 16; loops on tracks 5, 6, 13 and 14; percussion on track 12; sound technician

=== Session musicians ===
- Cecília Spyer and Jurema Cândia – backing vocals on track 12
- Jack Endino – electric guitar on tracks 1–6, 15 and 16; bass on tracks 6–8
- Emerson Villani – electric guitar on tracks 5, 7–10, 12 and 14; acoustic guitar on track 9
- Liminha – electric guitar and bass on track 11
- Armando Marçal – percussion on tracks 2, 4, 7–9, 13, 14 and 16
- Paul Ralphes – claps on track 2

=== Technical personnel ===
- Titãs – mixing
- Marcelo Fromer, Branco Mello, Charles Gavin, Nando Reis, Sérgio Britto, Tony Bellotto – arrangements
- João Augusto – artistic direction
- Nelson Damascena – executive production
- Sombra Jones – roadie
- Jack Endino – recording engineering, Pro Tools operation, mixing, mixing engineering
- Duda Mello – recording engineering, Pro-tools operation
- Paul Ralphes – additional vocals production and overdubs
- Théo Marés, Luciano Tarta, Léo Moreira, Fernando Fischgold – assistants
- Sam Hofstedt – mixing engineering
- George Marino – mastering engineering
- Sandrix and Solange Ramos – catering in São Paulo and Rio de Janeiro, respectively
- Alexandre Ktenas and Marcia Martins – graphic coordination
- Domenico e Zoy Anastassakis – graphic project
- Philippe Leon – design assistant
- Helen Ribeiro – text revision
- Daniela Dacorso – photography
- Renata Sassi – photography assistant
- Patrícia Zuffa – costume design
- Claudia Senna – costume design assistant
