= Cigarette receptacle =

Container for discarding cigarette waste

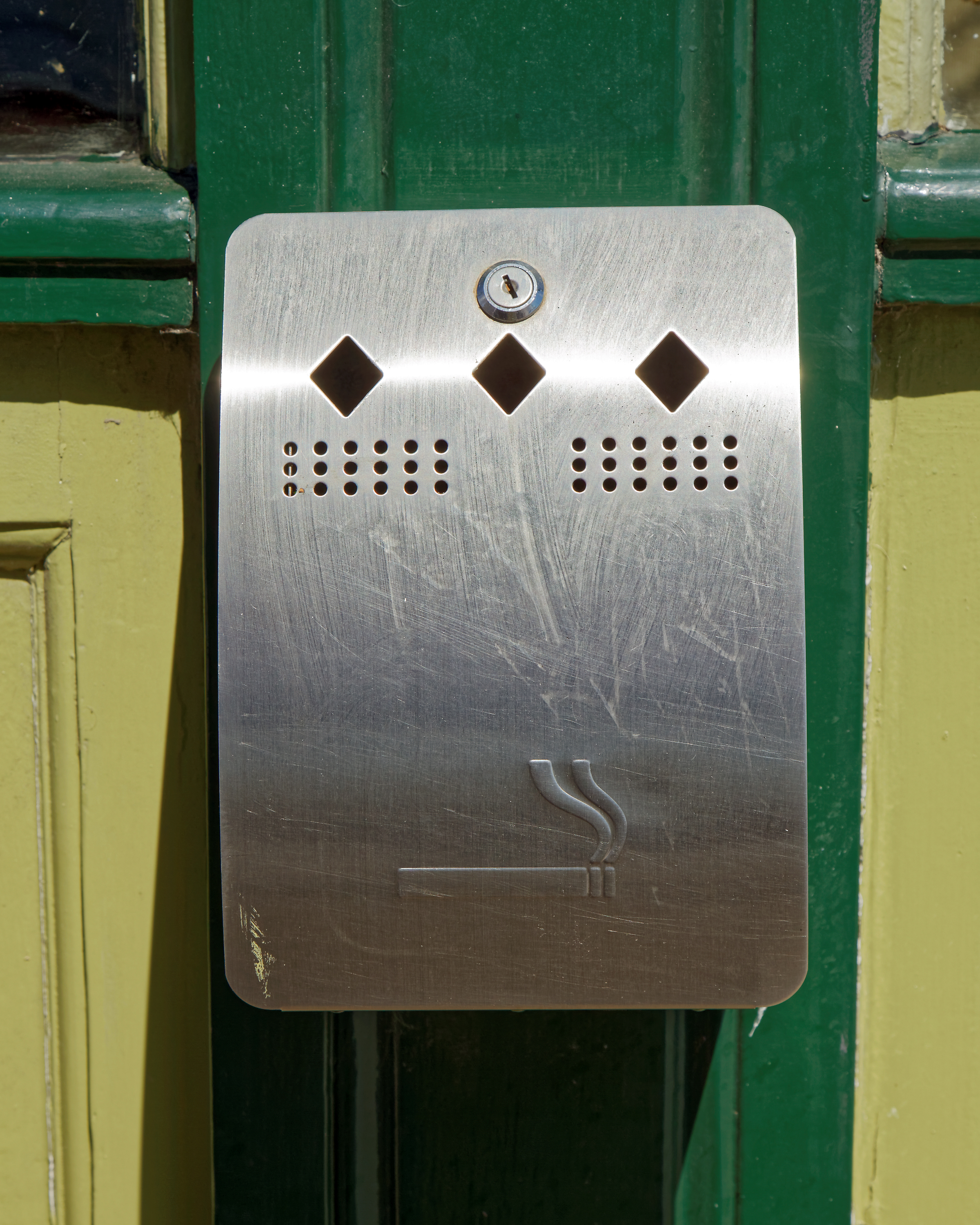
A wall mounted cigarette receptacle in Broadstairs, England

A cigarette receptacle is a container or device for extinguishing and disposing of cigarette waste. Other common names for cigarette receptacles include: ash urns, ash pans, cigarette butt receptacles, butt bins, butt holders, snuffers, smokers poles, cigarette waste receptacles, smokers waste receptacles, and ash/trash combinations.

Originally provided as a courtesy to smokers in public places, cigarette receptacles are now commonplace as smoking bans and designated smoking areas require proper disposal methods. A typical receptacle can hold hundreds—even thousands—of disposed cigarette butts.

In the United States, NFPA estimates that during 2019–2023 an annual average of about 15,200 home structure fires were started by smoking materials. This showcases why dedicated receptacles are a good fire-safety measure.

== Cigarette litter problem ==
Proper disposal of cigarette butts is promoted as both an environmental and health issue. The WHO FCTC Secretariat estimates that about 4.5 trillion cigarette butts end up littered in lakes, oceans, and soil each year. While cigarette smoking in the United States has decreased, cigarette butt litter remains the most littered item in the United States and globally. The overall littering rate for cigarette butts is 65%, and in all, tobacco products make up 38% of all roadway litter in the United States. Depending on composition, a cigarette butt can take as short as one month, and up to three years and longer to biodegrade. Cigarette filters made of the plant-based plastic cellulose acetate do eventually biodegrade, while some environmental groups claim filters containing plastic never fully biodegrade. Cigarette butts contain toxic chemicals including nicotine, cadmium and benzene. When discarded, they can also release cellulose acetate microfibers and leach chemicals and metals into aquatic environments. In Ocean Conservancy's International Coastal Cleanup data for 2022, cigarette butts were the most recorded item globally with 1,860,651 collected on coastlines worldwide. In the European Union, the Single-Use Plastics Directive includes measures for tobacco products with filters (and filters sold separately), including harmonised packaging markings and extended producer responsibility requirements intended to cover litter clean-up and related costs.

== Types ==
Cigarette receptacles for use in public and private establishments can be wall-mounted or free-standing, for indoor and outdoor use. Construction materials include metal (steel, stainless steel, aluminum), concrete, stone/epoxy aggregate, various plastics (polyethylene, recycled plastic), and fiberglass, with receptacles made of one material or a combination of several.

=== Ash urns ===
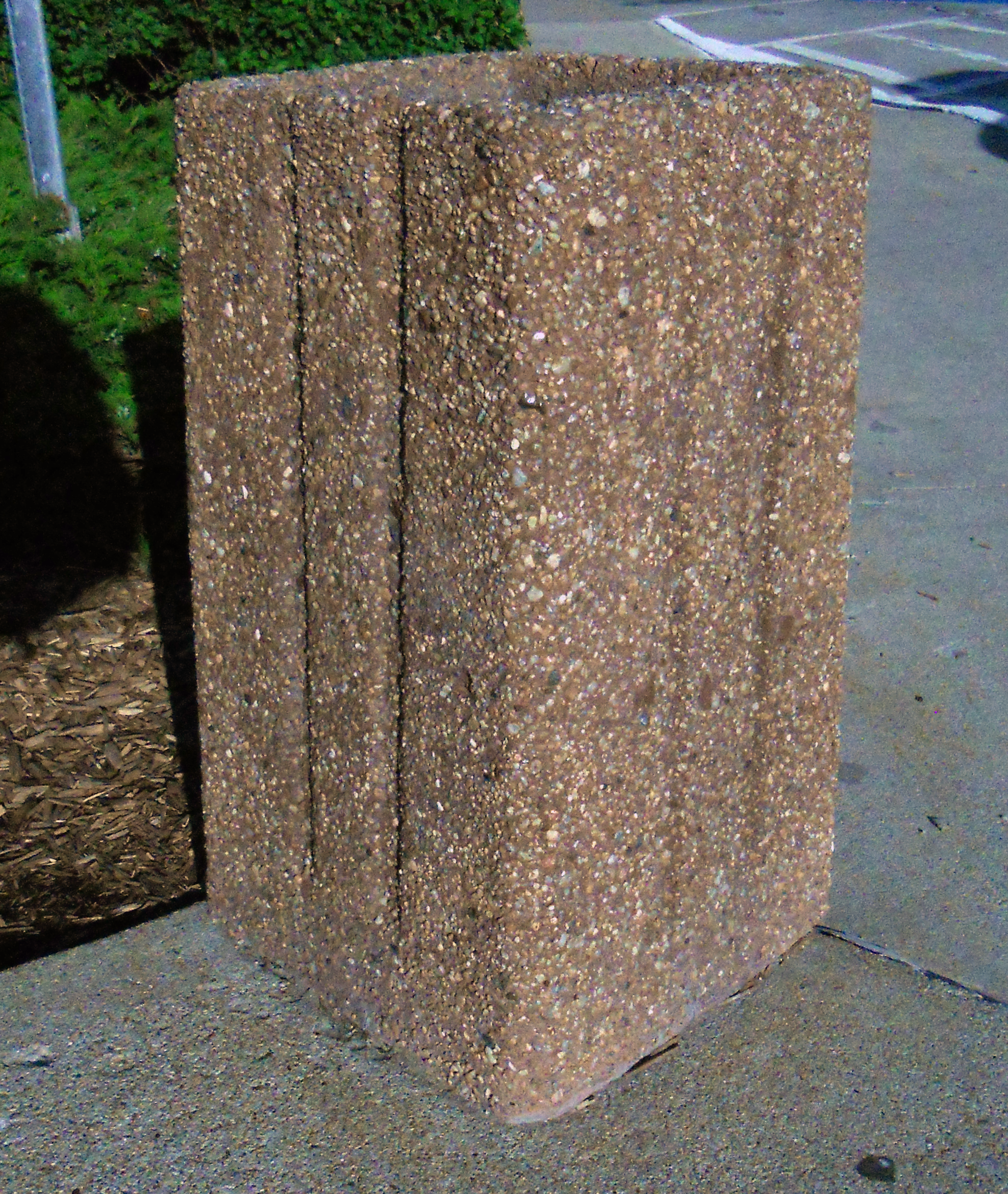
Concrete cigarette ash urn

Ash urns are usually mounted on a pedestal, and present a media such as sand or gravel for a smoker to snuff cigarette butts. This type of cigarette receptacle is also common in ash/trash combination units, with the urn placed on top of a trash bin below.

=== Wall mounted cigarette receptacles ===
Wall mounted cigarette receptacles are manufactured in a variety of shapes, sizes and butt disposal methods. Units with all-metal construction allow disposing of cigarette butts into a container with no other extinguishing media required. Some receptacles utilize a separate butt container for clean-out, while one-piece models simply dump used butts.

=== Tube cigarette receptacles ===
Tubular cigarette receptacles can be wall-mounted or free standing, of various lengths and diameters. Their simple design allows butts to be deposited directly into the tube, and to extinguish on their own. Usually constructed of metal, no other media, such as sand or water, is required. One and two-piece construction is common.

=== Free standing cigarette receptacles ===
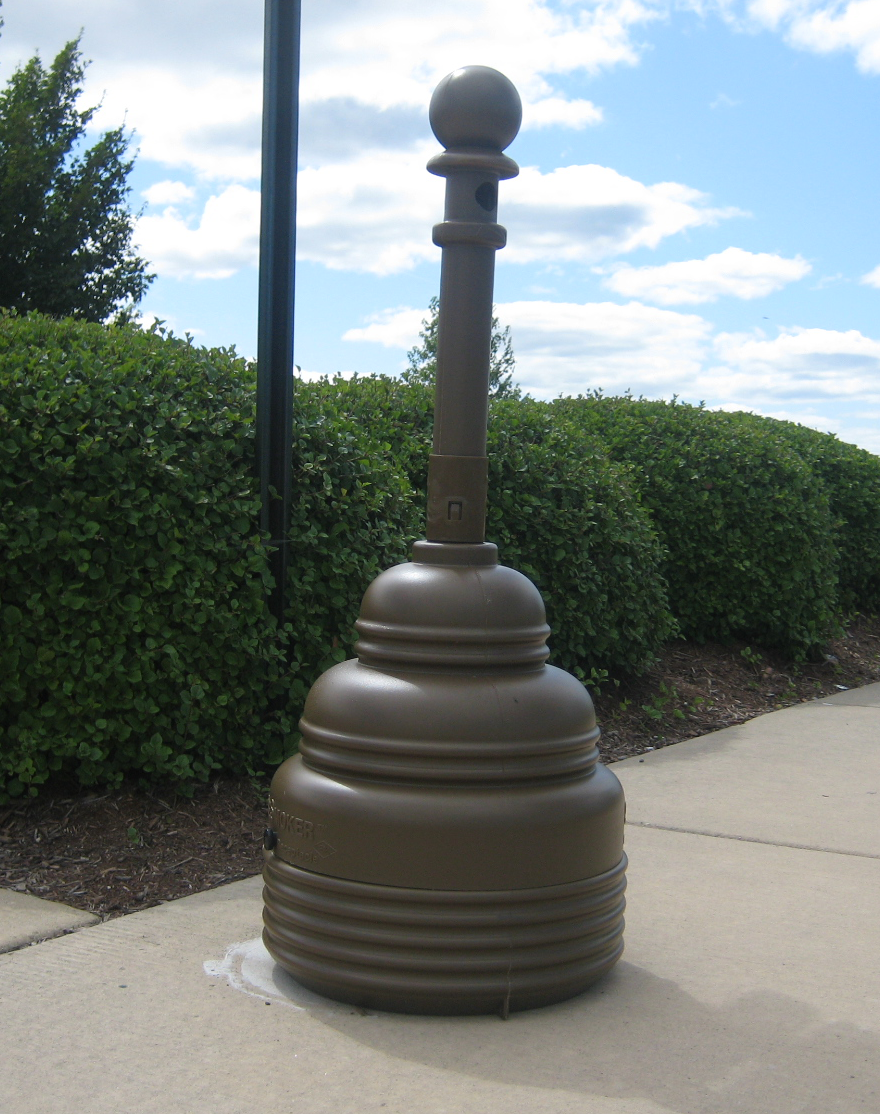
Free standing plastic cigarette receptacle

Made in a variety of configurations and construction materials, free standing cigarette receptacles come in heavy pre-cast concrete, lighter weight stone/epoxy aggregate and lighter still materials such as polyethylene, recycled plastic and fiberglass.

Many free standing cigarette receptacles utilize an oxygen restricting design that extinguishes still burning butts. These style receptacles are usually made of molded plastic, polyethylene and fiberglass, with metal inner liners and metal pails to gather disposed butts. Due to their oxygen depriving design, no additional extinguishing media is generally required. Cigarette butts are deposited through a small opening and drop in a long neck into the collection chamber. The collection chamber typically houses the removable pail. In certain occupancies, codes require noncombustible ashtrays and metal containers with self-closing covers in areas where smoking is permitted.

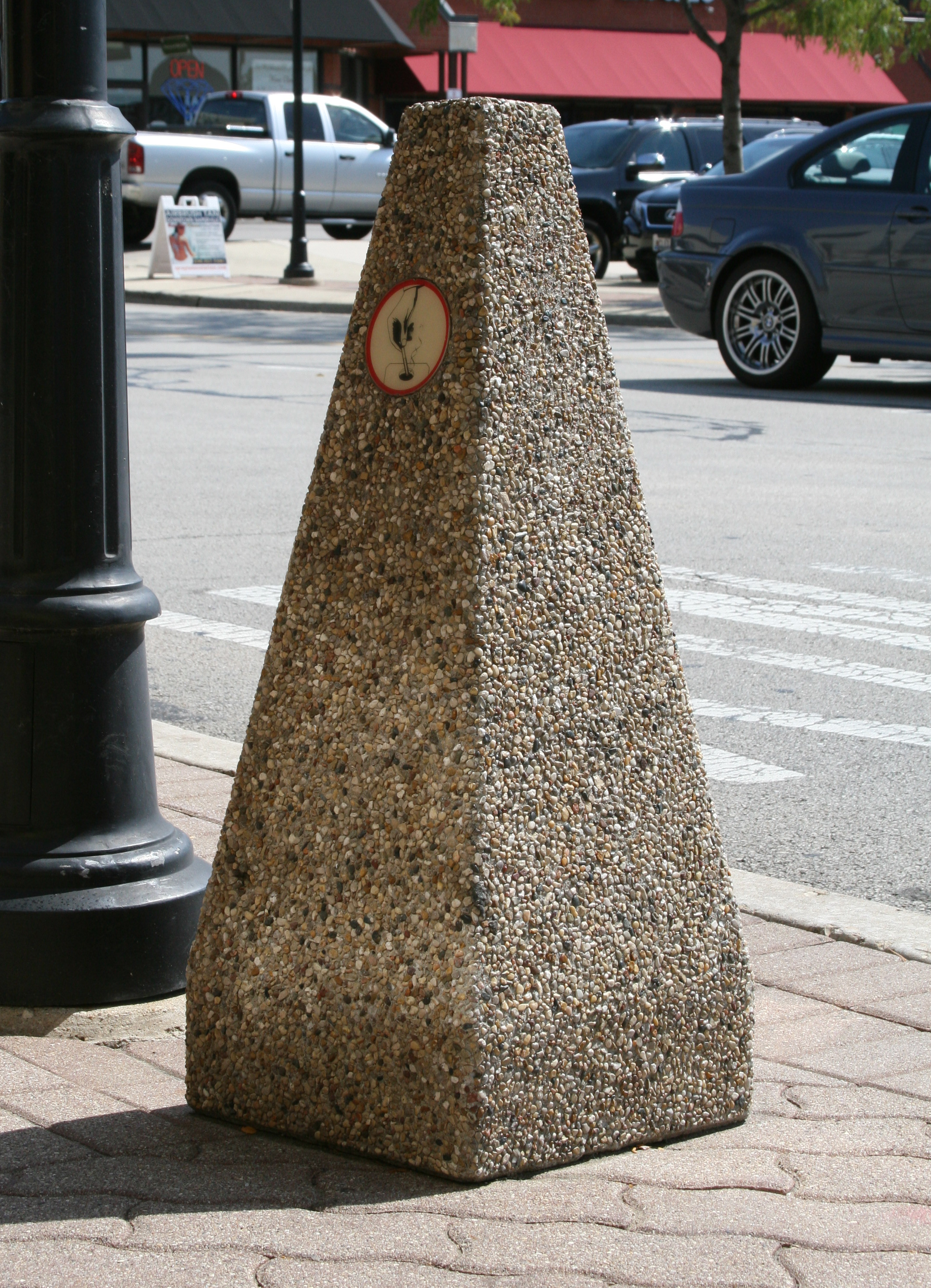
Free standing concrete cigarette receptacle

Other free standing receptacles, such as those made of pre-cast concrete and stone aggregate materials, rely on water, sand or gravel placed in the collection bin to assist in extinguishing disposed butts. Butt removal and clean-out is accomplished through a door in the receptacle's base, or, the base and top separate to allow access to disposed butts.

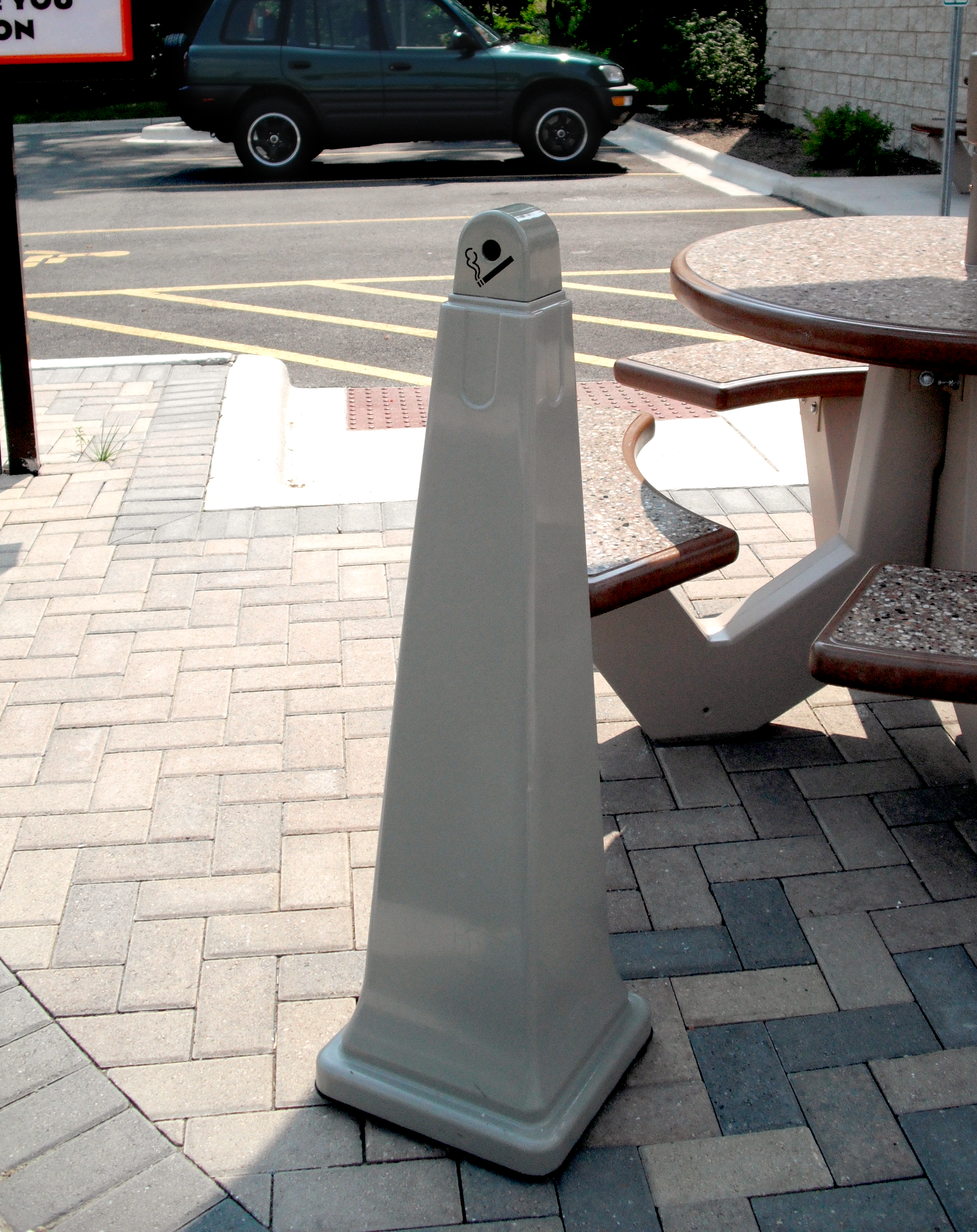
Free standing plastic cigarette receptacle

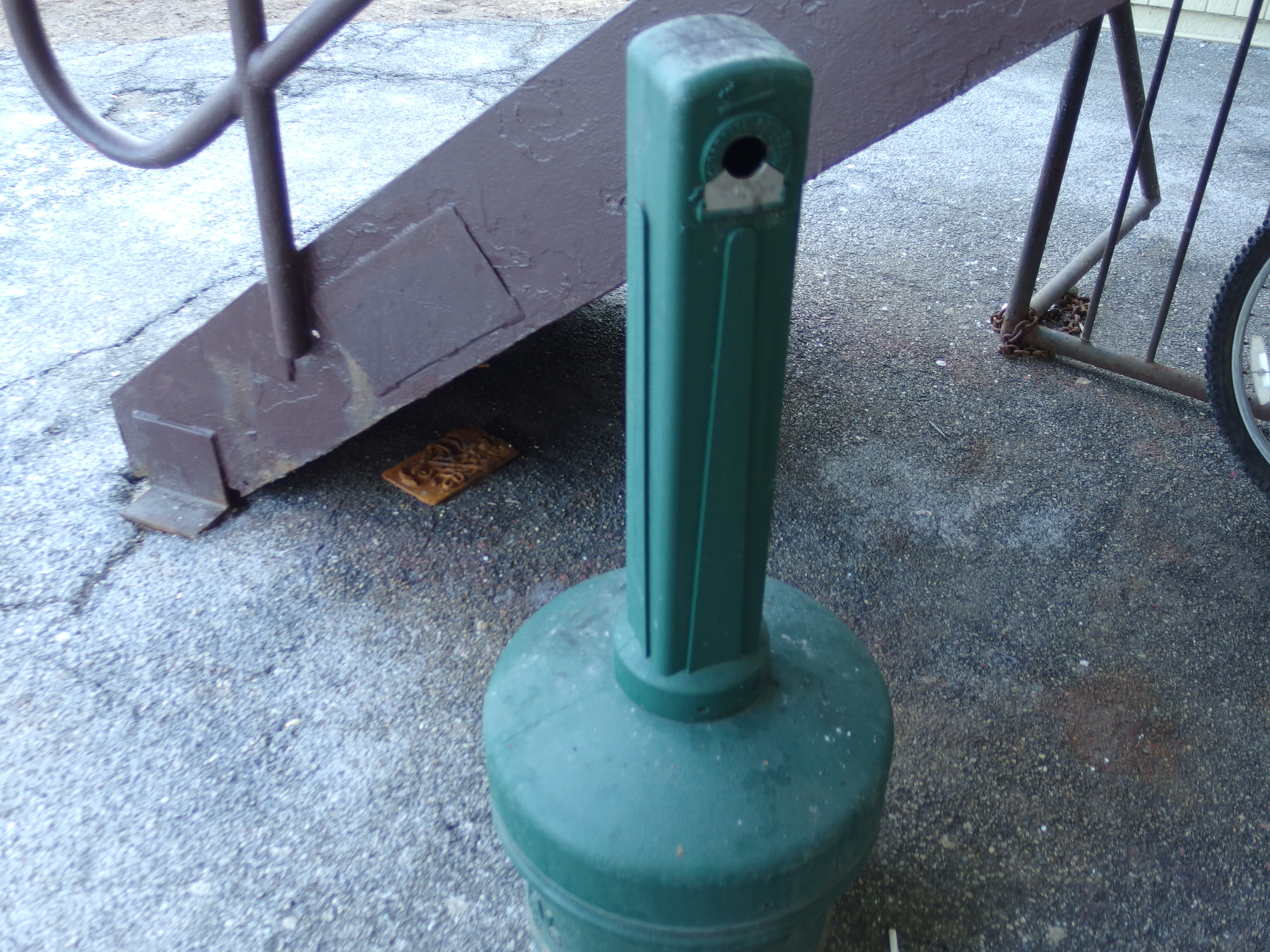
Cigarette tree

== Enhanced design features ==
Some cigarette receptacles contain unique design features at the butt entry point. These include:

- limited entry designs, to discourage unwanted trash
- covered openings to eliminate rainwater overflow
- large snuffer plates for better hygiene and an easier target
- recessed snuffer screens to prevent ashes from falling to the ground.
- noncombustible ashtrays and metal containers with self-closing covers

== Theme cigarette receptacles ==
Cigarette receptacles made of molded materials are often designed to match their surroundings. Sports themes such as receptacles decorated with golf balls and baseballs are common; other examples include nautical receptacles designed to look like buoys, receptacles resembling trees, and receptacles mimicking an architectural style.

== Accessories ==
Various size metal pails provide easy butt collection and removal. For receptacles with collection pails, odor-absorbing and fire suppressing filters, placed inside the pails, use baking soda for odor control and also release CO_{2} for fire suppression. Weighted bases assist free standing receptacles to remain steady in inclement weather. In areas where security is a concern, tie-downs, security cables and locks keep the cigarette receptacle safe from theft and vandalism.

== See also ==
- Ashtray
