= Titãs & Paralamas Juntos ao Vivo =

Live album by Titãs and Os Paralamas do Sucesso
- Released: 1999
- Recorded: November 1999 at Metropolitan, Rio de Janeiro
- Genre: Rock
- Label: Sempre Livre
- Producer: Léo Garrido

Titãs albums chronology
As Dez Mais (1999)	Titãs & Paralamas Juntos ao Vivo (1999)	A Melhor Banda de Todos os Tempos da Última Semana (2001)

Os Paralamas do Sucesso chronology
Acústico MTV (1999)	Titãs & Paralamas Juntos ao Vivo (1999)	Longo Caminho (2002)

Titãs live albums chronology
Acústico MTV (1997)	Titãs & Paralamas Juntos ao Vivo (1999)	MTV ao Vivo (2005)

Os Paralamas do Sucesso live albums chronology
Acústico MTV (1999)	Titãs & Paralamas Juntos ao Vivo (1999)	Uns Dias ao Vivo (2004)

Titãs & Paralamas Juntos ao Vivo is a live album by Brazilian rock bands Titãs and Os Paralamas do Sucesso recorded and released in 1999. It features hits from both bands, an interview with both band members and the label's jingle. It's Titãs' third live album and Paralamas' fourth. it also marks the second time both bands perform together, the first being in the 1992 edition of Hollywood Rock.

The album was recorded amidst a homonymous tour which took the bands to many cities of Brazil (Rio de Janeiro, Londrina, Porto Alegre, Sorocaba, Araras, Goiânia, Salvador, Brasília, Campinas, Vitória, Aracaju, Curitiba and São Paulo).

The series of shows (each having an estimated cost of R$300,000) was conceived by Ajom Produções and would mark the debut of Sempre Livre Mix, a project that aimed at creating one annual attraction targeting a young audience, but that did not go beyond this tour.

The first performance took place on 15 May. By the time of the tour's announcement, some guest performances from notable Brazilian female singers like Fernanda Takai (Pato Fu), Paula Toller (Kid Abelha), Cássia Eller and Rita Lee were expected to happen. During the tour, each band performed alone for 50 minutes and then joined forces for a 40-minute joint show with two drums, two basses, two brass sections and two percussionists.

== Track listing ==
No.	Title	Writer(s)	Lead vocals	Length
1.	"Lanterna dos Afogados" (Flashlight of the Drowned)	Herbert Vianna	Vianna	5:47
2.	"Nem 5 Minutos Guardados" (Not Even 5 Minutes Kept)	Sérgio Britto, Marcelo Fromer	Britto	4:38
3.	"O Beco" (The Alley)	Bi Ribeiro, Vianna	Vianna, Paulo Miklos	2:58
4.	"Diversão" (Fun)	Britto, Nando Reis	Miklos, Vianna	4:13
5.	"Ska"	Vianna	Vianna, Miklos	2:23
6.	"Lugar Nenhum" (Nowhere)	Arnaldo Antunes, Charles Gavin, Fromer, Britto, Tony Bellotto	Branco Mello, Vianna	4:52
7.	"Pólvora" (Powder)	Vianna	Vianna, Mello	3:27
8.	"Comida" (Food)	Antunes, Fromer, Britto	Miklos, Vianna	3:21
9.	"Entrevista Titãs e Paralamas" (Interview Titãs and Paralamas)			8:58
10.	"Jingle Sempre Livre"			0:30

== Personnel ==
Adapted from the booklet:

=== Titãs and Os Paralamas do Sucesso ===
- Branco Mello - lead vocals
- Herbert Vianna - lead vocals, guitar
- Sérgio Britto - vocals, keyboards
- Paulo Miklos - vocals, harmonica
- Marcelo Fromer - guitar
- Tony Bellotto - guitar
- Nando Reis - bass
- Bi Ribeiro - bass
- Charles Gavin - drums
- João Barone - drums

=== Session musicians ===
Titãs

- Eduardo Morelenbaum - saxophone, keyboards
- Henrique Band - saxophone and flute
- Elias Correa - trombone
- Paulo Mendonça - trumpet
- Ricardo Imperatore - percussion

Os Paralamas do Sucesso

- João Fera - keyboards
- Biduú Cordeiro - trombone
- Demétrio Bezerra - trumpet
- Monteiro Jr. - saxophone
- Eduardo Lyra - percussion

=== Technical personnel ===
- Ajom Produções - general direction and idealization
- Léo Garrido - musical production, recording technician, member of Paralamas technical team
- Vinícius Sá - recording technician
- Victor Farias - mixing technician
- Carlos Freitas and Flávia Toyama - mastering technicians
- Theo Mares and Jorge Guerreiro - studio assistants
- Pedro Ribeiro, Alexandre Santos, Marcos Olívio, Helder Vianna, Alejandro Bertoli, Alexndre Saieg, Jorge Carvalho, Orbílio Rosa - Paralamas technical team
- Vera Franco, João Libarino, Júlio Correa, Sérgio Molina, Sombra Jones, Viça, Lauro Silva, Marcelo Tição - Titãs technical team
