= Vossa Excelência =

Single by Titãs

from the album MTV ao Vivo
- Released: 7 September 2005
- Recorded: August 12 or 13, 2005, at the São José da Ponta Grossa fortress, in Florianópolis, Santa Catarina.
- Genre: Alternative rock, punk rock, protest song
- Label: BMG
- Songwriter(s): Charles Gavin, Paulo Miklos, Tony Bellotto
- Producer(s): Jack Endino

Titãs singles chronology
"Provas de Amor" (2004)	"Vossa Excelência" (2005)	"O Inferno São os Outros" (2006)

"Vossa Excelência" is the nineteenth single by Titãs, released in 2005. The song basically criticizes the hypocrisy and lack of care from politicians, referring to the Mensalão scandal. It was performed for the first time on 5 August 2005 during a show at Circo Voador, in Rio de Janeiro, around ten days after the song's completion. It received a live video which was nominated for the 2006 MTV Video Music Brazil award.

The band said that at the time of the single's release, they were informed by the label that radio stations of Brasília (capital of Brazil) were not airing the song, although some stations from the Rio de Janeiro-São Paulo axis weren't giving them any airplay either. At the time, guitarist and coauthor of the track, Tony Bellotto, said he believed many of Brasília stations were "committed" with politicians, and that stations from the Rio de Janeiro-São Paulo axis could have been afraid of offending any politician.

== Composition and lyrics ==
Commenting about the track, Bellotto said:

For the last year, specifically, in which we saw so many reports of corruption in Brasília, we couldn't refrain from reacting, we just couldn't stand still before so much resentment. But our concern wasn't - and never was - to make a pamphlet song, it's not that. Above all, our main concern has always been to compose music. And Vossa Excelência, before being a protest song, is good rockn'roll.

On the other hand, he stated the song does not generalize corruption in Brasília.

[...] it's a genuine aggressiveness. We do not generalize. We're not saying every politician is a thief, every politician is corrupt. We know there are cool people at the Congress. You can notice that the cuss words are singular. "Corrupt", "thief". That's because we were referring to individual politicians, to who effectively robbed, tricked the people. When we use swearwords, it's never for nothing. It's just that sometimes only a swearword expresses the exact feeling.

About its composition, he said the initiative came from vocalist and guitarist Paulo Miklos (another coauthor of the track), who was already scratching some songs for the group's then-upcoming album MTV ao Vivo, in which the single would be featured. The song was finished in three days and, for Bellotto, "it was born quite spontaneous, in the heat of the moment. [...] The lyrics ended up with that comic and sharp vein of Miklos [...]. And it's got that indignant chorus which represents - I think - the words everyone would like to use at that time. I think it expresses the population's will to swear, to put out all the feeling of indignation".

When asked about his opinion on the fact that few artists have expressed their views about the scandals of that time, Bellotto said that "most of the [artistic] class has always supported [then president of Brazil] Lula. I don't know if they felt committed to him, or if they just sat in the fence, just like Lula did".

On the other hand, he said he was still sympathetic about the former president, although he was disappointed with what he saw as a "shy" reaction to the scandal. "I always liked him very much and I think all this dirt does not destroy the brilliant guy that he was, that he is. But his attitude was below expectations. He had to be clearer, more emphatic, and, however, before all that mess, he sat in the fence."

Miklos, however, said he wanted the song to "supplant the opportunistic criticism and serve as a channel to denounce the 'chronic corruption' that infests the country since a long time and 'turns everyone into accomplices'."

== Track listing ==
No.	Title	Music	Length
1.	"Vossa Excelência"	Charles Gavin, Paulo Miklos, Tony Bellotto	3:09

== Personnel ==
Adapted from the booklet of MTV ao Vivo, the album in which the single was featured:

- Paulo Miklos - lead vocals, guitar
- Branco Mello - backing vocals
- Sérgio Britto - backing vocals
- Tony Bellotto - guitar
- Charles Gavin - drums

Session musicians

- Emerson Villani - guitar
- Lee Marcucci - bass
