= O Mundo É Bão, Sebastião! =

"O Mundo é Bão, Sebastião!"

Single by Titãs

from the album A Melhor Banda de Todos os Tempos da Última Semana
- Released: 2002
- Genre: Rock
- Label: Abril Music
- Songwriter: Nando Reis
- Producer: Jack Endino

Titãs singles chronology
"'Epitáfio'" (2002)	"O Mundo é Bão, Sebastião!" (2002)	"'Enquanto Houver Sol'" (2004)

"O Mundo é Bão, Sebastião!" (The World is Good, Sebastião!) is the sixteenth single by Titãs, released in 2002. "Bão" is "Bom" (Good) written in the caipira dialect. The song was written by bass guitarist Nando Reis and dedicated to his son, Sebastião, who was 6 at the time of the recording.

Reis created the song as the band was preparing to begin work on their then upcoming album, but because he didn't have any song to show them, he was in agony and wrote the lyrics. Then, during a mixing session with Cássia Eller, he showed her the lyrics as she played the piano and asked her to play the chords, and that was the birth of the song.

It was written by Nando in Taos, USA, where he was recording overdubs for his then upcoming album A Letra A with producer and drummer Barrett Martin. Barrett was dating an Indian woman who lived in a nearby village. One night, Nando participated in a shamanic ritual with her tribe, and soon after, he sat in front of a fireplace in Barrett's house and quickly wrote the track that he says is possibly his biggest hit.

== Track listing ==
1. O Mundo é Bão, Sebastião! ("The World is Good, Sebastião!") — 4:15
