= Autoramas =

Brazilian rock band from Rio de Janeiro

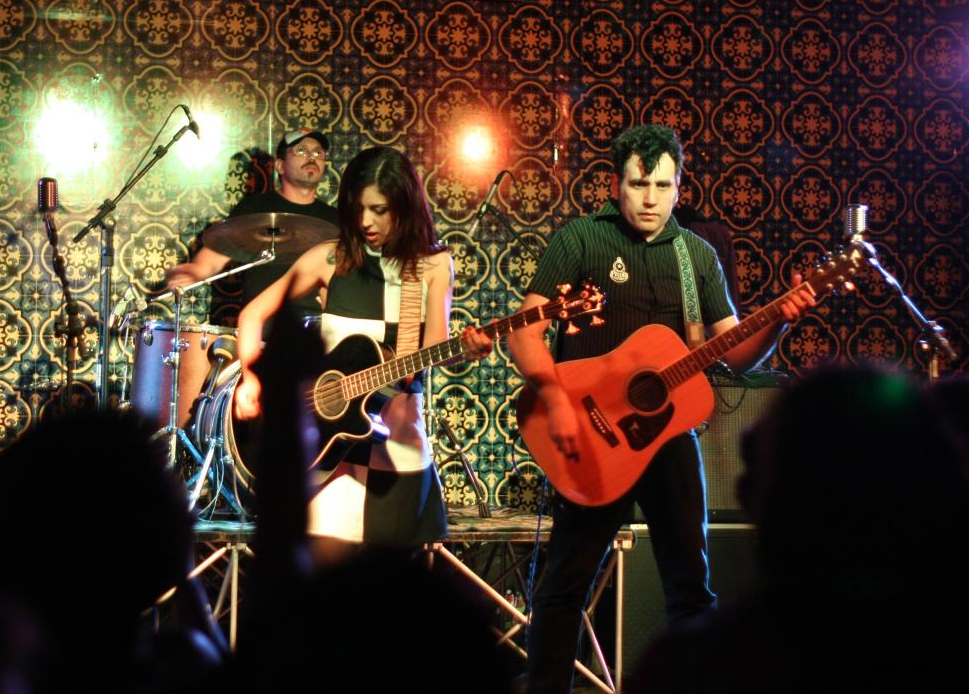
- Autoramas - Live concert in 2010

Background information
- Origin: Rio de Janeiro, Brazil
- Genres: Indie rock, rockabilly, surf music, punk rock, garage punk
- Years active: 1997 - present
- Labels: Hearts Bleed Blue Monstro Discos, Mondo 77, Trama
- Members: Gabriel Thomaz; Igor Sciallis; Jairo Fajersztajn; Luma Garcia
- Past members: Nervoso; Simone; Selma Vieira; Bacalhau; Flávia Couri; Fred Castro; Érika Martins; Fábio Lima; Melvin
- Website: http://autoramasrock.com.br/

The Autoramas are a Brazilian rock band that started in the late 1990s.

== History ==
The Autoramas was formed by Gabriel Thomaz (guitar and vocals), Nervoso (drum) and Simone (bass). In 1998 the drummer Bacalhau ereplaced Nervoso, and the group made its first presentation live. In 2000 their first CD was released, Stress, Depressão & Síndrome do Pânico, produced by Carlo Bartolini and released by the independent label Astronauta Discos Music. The songs Fale Mal de Mim and Carinha Triste were broadcast on Brazil radio and MTV Brasil, and Autoramas went on a tour from Rio Grande do Sul to Amapá in more than 80 concerts, including a presentation in Rock In Rio III.

Their second album, Vida REal, was released at the end of 2001. After a new tour in Brasil, they departed for their first international tour in Japan, along with the local band Guitar Wolf. Their third, Nada Pode Parar Os Autoramas, was released in 2003 by the independent record label Monster Records. This album won the London Burning Award for Independent Music in the categories Best Band and Best Disco of 2003, and won invitations to major festivals in Brazil.

In 2004 the Autoramas went on their second international tour, playing in Argentina and Uruguay in Montevideo, Buenos Aires and Rosario, followed by the third international tour, with four shows in Chile and Argentina, with the participation of the new bass player, Selma Vieira. Their song Você Sabe was played on MTV and three prizes in the VMB of 2005.

In May 2007, after touring Europe, the band launched its fourth CD, Teletransporte, with the record label Mondo 77. Selma leaft the group in 2008, being replaced by Flávia Couri. At the end of 2009 Autoramas released the CD and DVD MTV Apresenta Autoramas Desplugado. In June 2011, the Autoramas began to raise funds and finalize the recordings of their studio album, Música Crocante.

In 2013, the Autoramas joined BNegão to record the EP Auto Boogie. With production of Frejat, the recording was released in digital format in September, with the physical version released only on vinyl. The EP was a preview of the partnership of their participation in the Rock In Rio festival. In November of the same year the group released the DVD Autoramas Internacional, also produced through collective financing. Recorded as a documentary, it features amateur recordings of the Autoramas touring in countries including Germany, Spain, England and Chile, interspersed by video clips from their albums.

At the beginning of 2015, the Autoramas announced a new formation, being joined by Melvin (bass), Fred Castro (ex-drummer of Raimundos) and Érika Martins (ex-Penélope) on guitar, percussion, keyboards and voice. In October 2016, drummer Fred Castro was replaced by Fábio Lima, and the band departed for their fourteenth European tour with Jairo Fajersztajn in the bass. The bands performances in Germany, Austria and Portugal, where they recorded a program for the RTP Channel 3 No Ar.

The single Quando A Polícia Chegar reached No. 7 in and stayed in the Top 30 on Radio Antena3 for five months in Portugal. In Brazil, the single Quando a Polícia Chegar reached first position in the main rock radios of the country. The single Verão reached No. 2 in the Portuguese charts, where it stayed for six months. In 2017, they did another international tour through SXSW in the US and Mexico.

Their album Libido was ranked as the 13th best Brazilian album of 2018 by the Brazilian edition of Rolling Stone magazine, and among the 25 best Brazilian albums of the second half of 2018 by the São Paulo Association of Art Critics.

== Discography ==
=== Albums ===
- 2000 – Stress, Depressão & Síndrome do Pânico
- 2001 – Vida Real
- 2003 – Nada Pode Parar Os Autoramas
- 2007 – Teletransporte
- 2009 – MTV Apresenta Autoramas Desplugado
- 2011 – Música Crocante
- 2016 – O Futuro Dos Autoramas
- 2018 – Libido
- 2020 – B-Sides & Extras Vol. 1
- 2021 – B-Sides & Extras Vol. 2
- 2022 – Autointitulado

=== 7 Inch ===
- 1999 – Motocross/Bahamas - Monstro Discos
- 2002 – HxCxlx - Monstro Discos
- 2008 – Catchy Chorus/Paciência - Gravadora Discos
- 2010 – Couldn´t Care At All/Samba-Rock Do Bacalhau - Gravadora Discos
- 2017 – Jet To The Jungle/Demais - Hearts Bleed Blue
- 2017 – Autoramas/Mundo Alto - Hearts Bleed Blue

=== Compilations ===
- 2001 – Full Speed Ahead (released only in Japan)
- 2005 – RRRRRRRROCK
- 2007 – Mucho Gusto (released only in Argentina)
- 2015 – Unsere Favoriten (released only in Germany)

=== DVDs ===
- 2009 – MTV Apresenta: Autoramas Desplugado
- 2013 – Autoramas Internacional
