= Tim (musician) =

Zambian rapper and songwriter (born 1989)

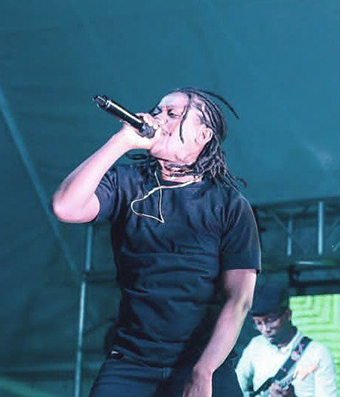
- Tim on stage in Lusaka
- Born: Timbwama Chisenga; October 28, 1989 (age 36); Lusaka, Zambia
- Other names: Thugga; Tim Thugga; Tim
- Occupations: Rapper; songwriter
- Years active: 2009–present
- Musical career
- Genre: Hip hop
- Instrument: Vocals
- Formerly of: Zone Fam

Timbwama Chisenga (born October 28, 1989) better known as Tim Thugga or now just Tim is a Zambian gospel rapper and songwriter. He rose to prominence as a member of the boy group Zone Fam formed in 2009 after they were all signed to Slam Dunk Records. While in Zone Fam, Tim began to establish himself as a solo artist until April 1, 2015, when he officially announced his plans to be a gospel artist on his social media. His first single as a solo Christian hip hop artist, "Heartbeat" (produced by Mag44), was released in 2017 off his debut album TIM (This Is Music), set to be released in 2021.

== Discography ==
- October 28, 2010 (Mixtape)
- Hypnosis EP 2013
- SONDER (Album) 2023
