= Ashtray =

Tray for collecting ash from cigarettes and cigars

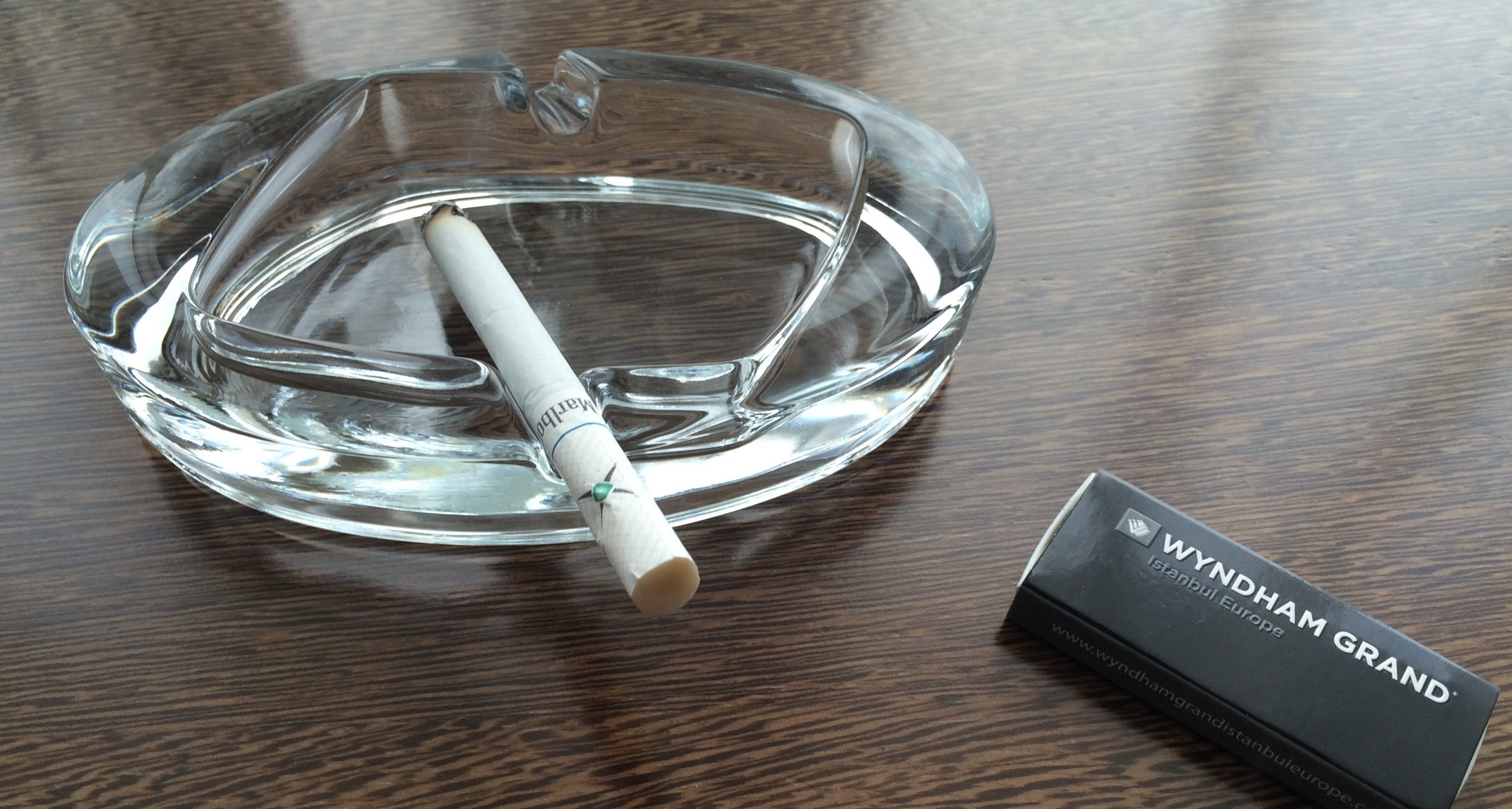
A glass ashtray, holding a lit cigarette in an edge indentation with a small box of matches nearby

An ashtray is a receptacle for ash from cigarettes, cigars, and other smokable products. Ashtrays typically are made of fire-retardant material such as glass, heat-resistant plastic, pottery, metal, or stone. It differs from a cigarette receptacle, which is specifically for discarding cigarettes after being smoked.

== Types ==
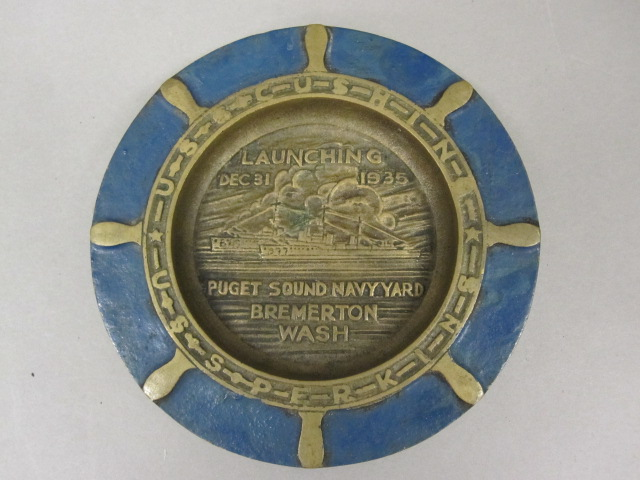
Commemorative, decorative ashtray manufactured 1935 (photo 2011)

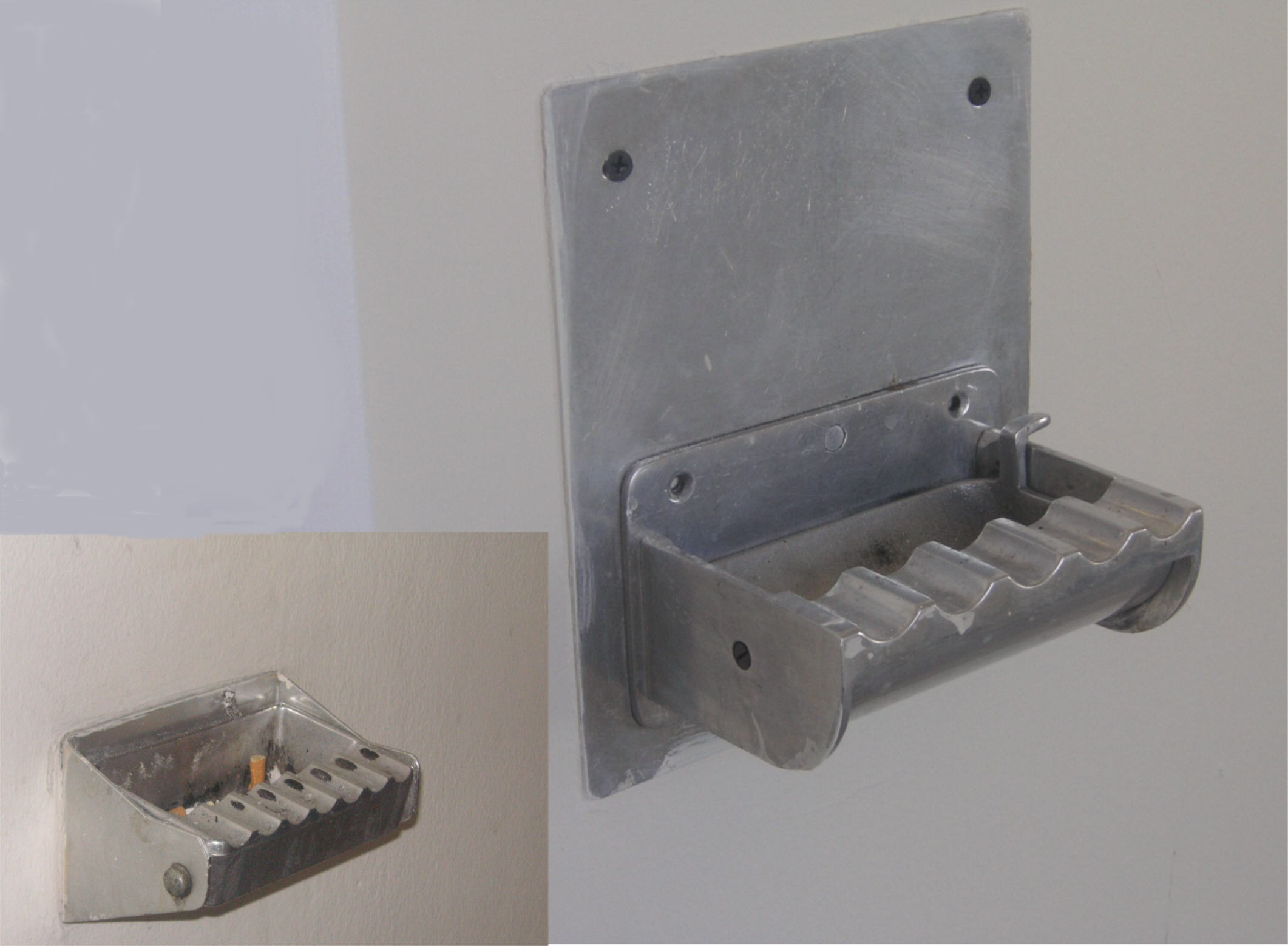
Wall-mounted ashtray

Standing type ashtray for passing pedestrians.

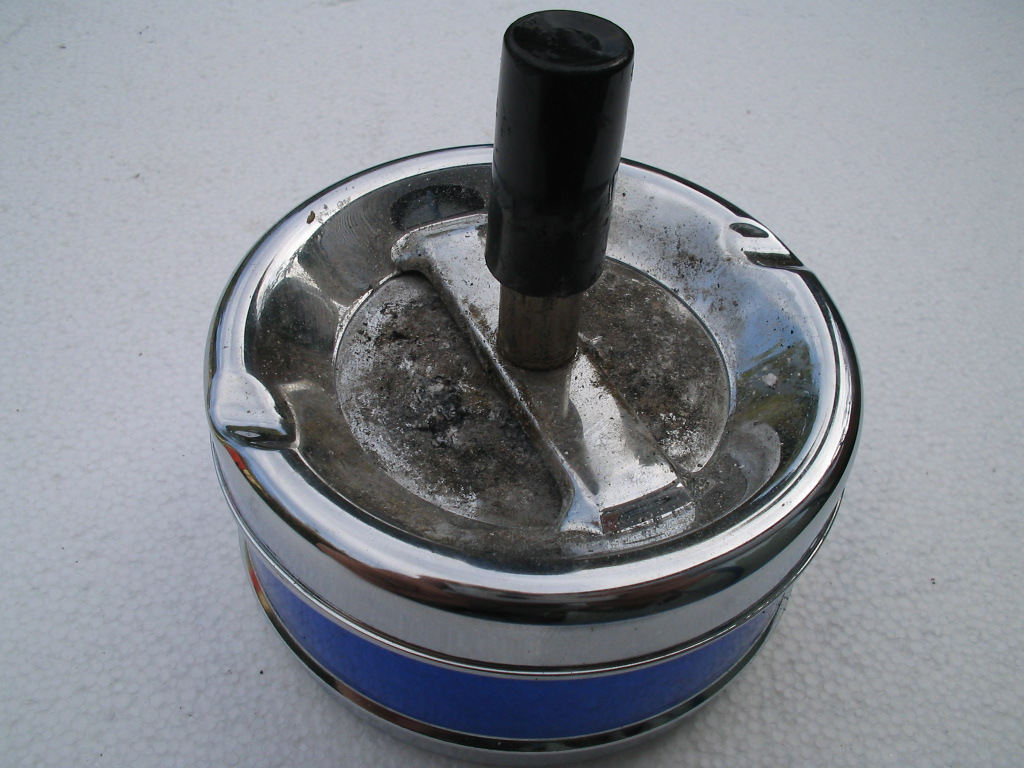
An ashtray with a cover. A metal surface of the cover serves to place a cigarette during smoking, to drop ash on and to extinguish the cigarette once finished. Then, the user presses the mechanism and the ashes and the cigarette butt are dropped into the internal chamber.

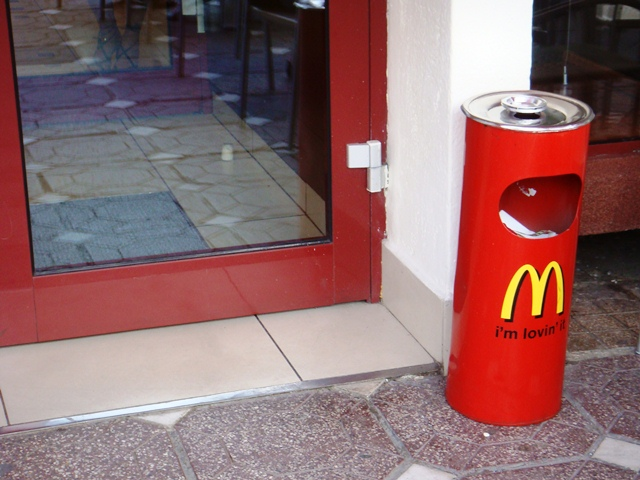
A trashcan equipped with an ashtray at its top. Because the ashes and the potentially still lit cigarette butts are separated from other garbage, the risk of fire is reduced.

The most common ashtray design is a shallow cylinder with a flat base, to rest on a table. Other ashtrays, particularly in public places, are wall-mounted, and larger than standard tabletop ashtrays due to the increased use they receive. There are also public ashtrays combined with trashcans.

Many ashtrays have notches at the rim, to hold cigarettes and/or a cigar. Frequently ashtrays were equipped in older large or luxury cars before later being available as dealer-installed accessory items. There are ashtrays that have a cover to prevent odor from leaving the ashtray. It also prevents oxygen from flowing in, so a cigarette will go out by itself, even if it has not been completely extinguished by pushing into the surface.

== History ==
While simple, primitive forms of ashtrays existed long before the 19th century, it was during the start of the 20th century that the design, aesthetics and their popularity really took off. As more women began to smoke in the early 1900s, the ashtray went closer to an art form. Many women avoided the use of the traditional ashtray as it failed to reflect their feminine values through an activity that was long declared as being exclusive to men.

What emerged were detailed, often very fancy ashtrays. These ashtrays depicted pastoral scenes of maidens wandering through vibrantly colored landscapes. Some even featured very luxurious cast-iron models of women in fancy dresses, animals in states of play and the occasional porcelain or ceramic tray highlighting extravagant floral arrangements.

The word "ashtray" in unhyphenated form, rather than "ash tray" or "ash-tray", did not come into common use until 1926. As time went on, and the onset of women smoking both cigars and cigarettes became less of a departure from the average person, ashtrays saw a decline in design aesthetics and began more of a shift towards practicality. However, it was not uncommon to see ashtrays featuring pin-up girls in bars during this decade. It was also during this time that another trend in ashtrays began to emerge, which was the auto-ashtray.

For many decades vehicle ashtrays were available for automobiles. As early as 1925, car ashtrays and electric lighters were available for motorists to avoid ashing outside the car. By 2004, Ford and Honda began phasing out ashtrays as a standard feature. In the early years, some design oversights put these ash receptacles right below the A/C and heating so every time the owner would use either of these, the ash would inadvertently fly in their face or even all throughout the car. But as new vehicle models were constantly introduced to the public, these little flaws gave way and many began using chrome trays with covers that could be opened and closed at the driver's discretion.

Many luxury cars would create a more luxurious design and it was common to see intricately made ashtrays in some of the high-end cars of the day. These ashtrays would feature leather, high-end metals and even specialized engravings by the manufacturer. But, just like the stand-alone ashtray, the vehicle ashtray began to lose popularity and in 1994, vehicles began to be produced without them and instead, offer the buyer the option to include one from the dealer.

Today, ashtrays are still used for cigarette smokers, but they have also been making a small revival in popularity from the cigar aficionados of the world. Ashtrays designed for cigars are often larger than standard ashtrays and include notches big enough to hold the cigar.

== Ashtrays as design objects ==
A number of well-known designers have created ashtrays:

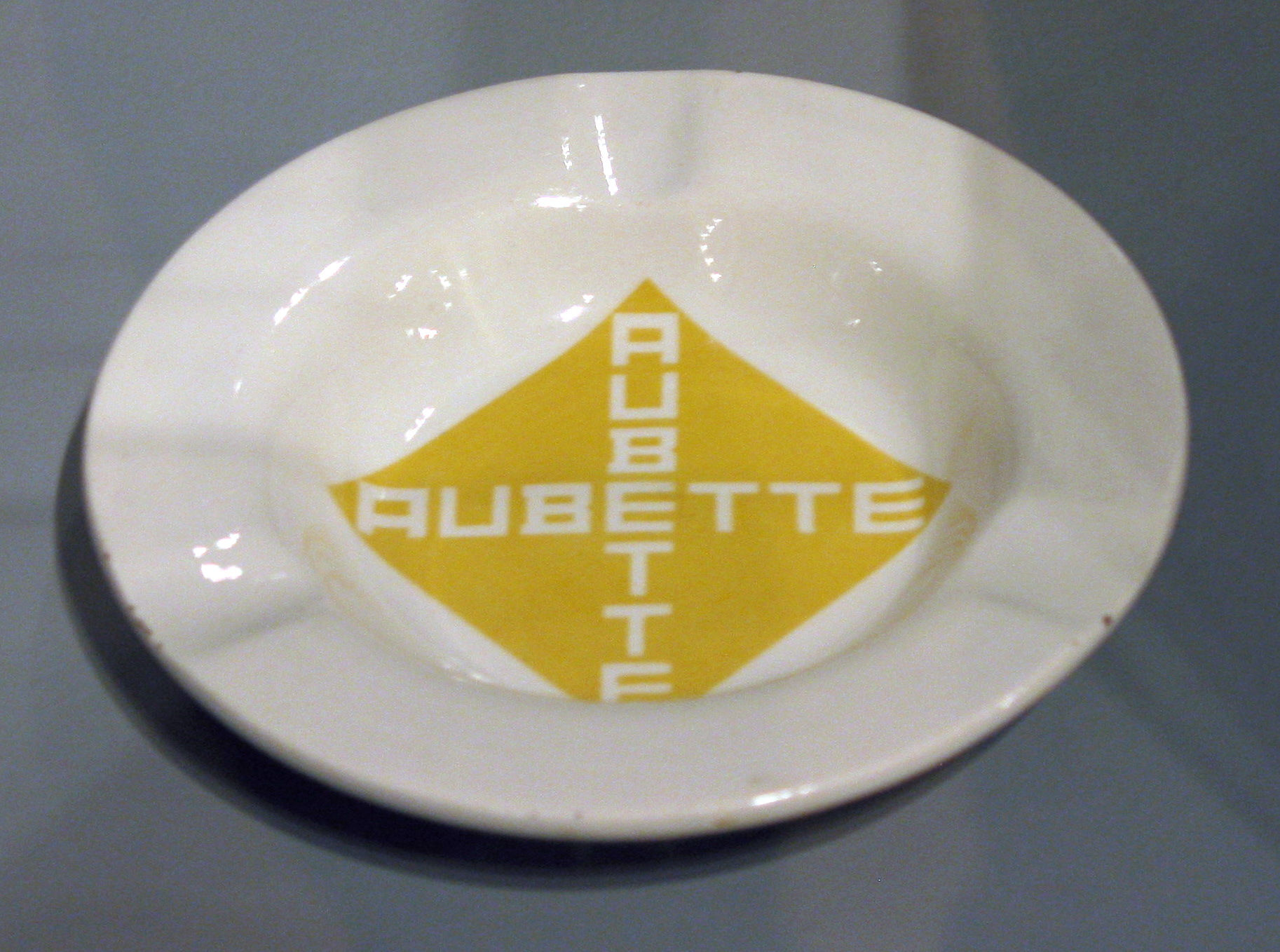
Theo van Doesburg (1927)

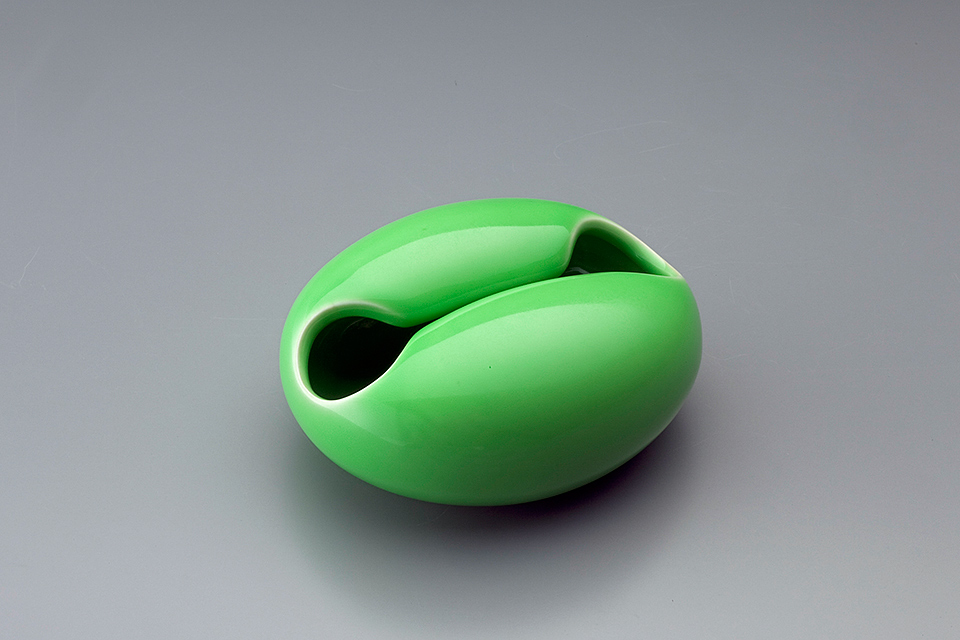
Masahiro Mori (1966)

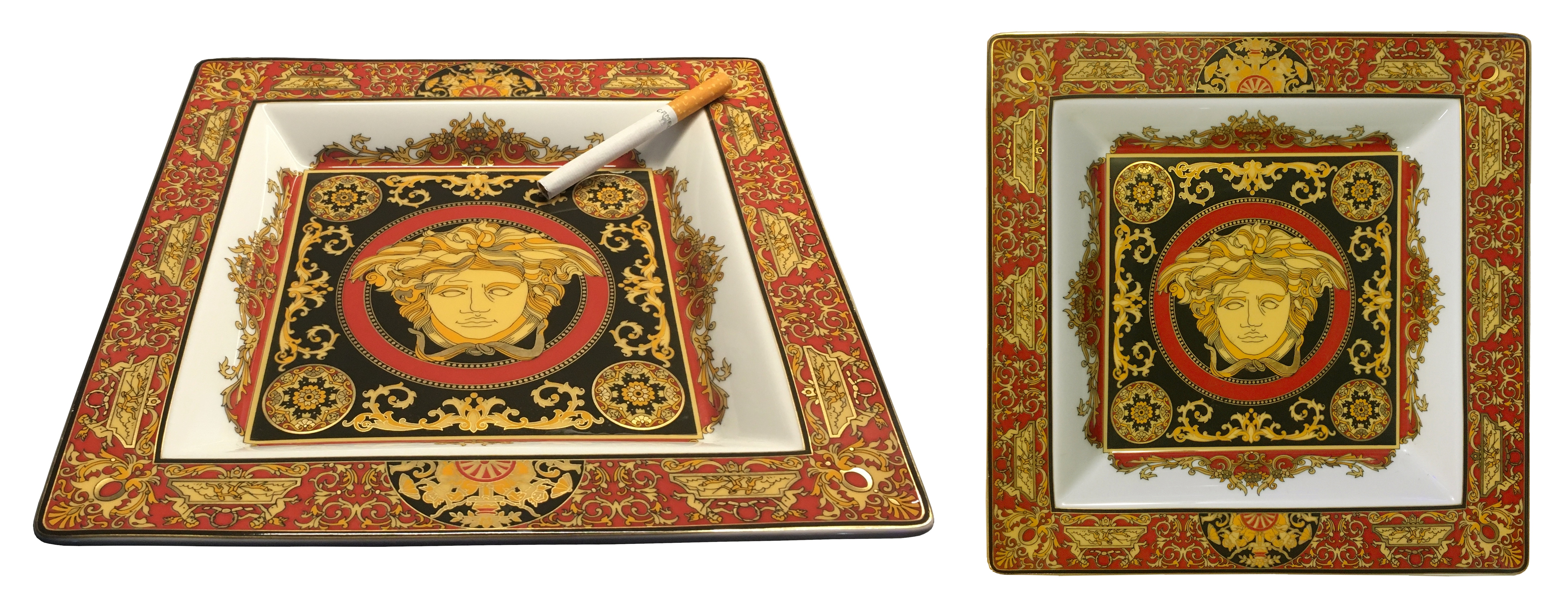
Large (22 cm × 22 cm) ashtray designed by Versace and produced by porcelain company Rosenthal

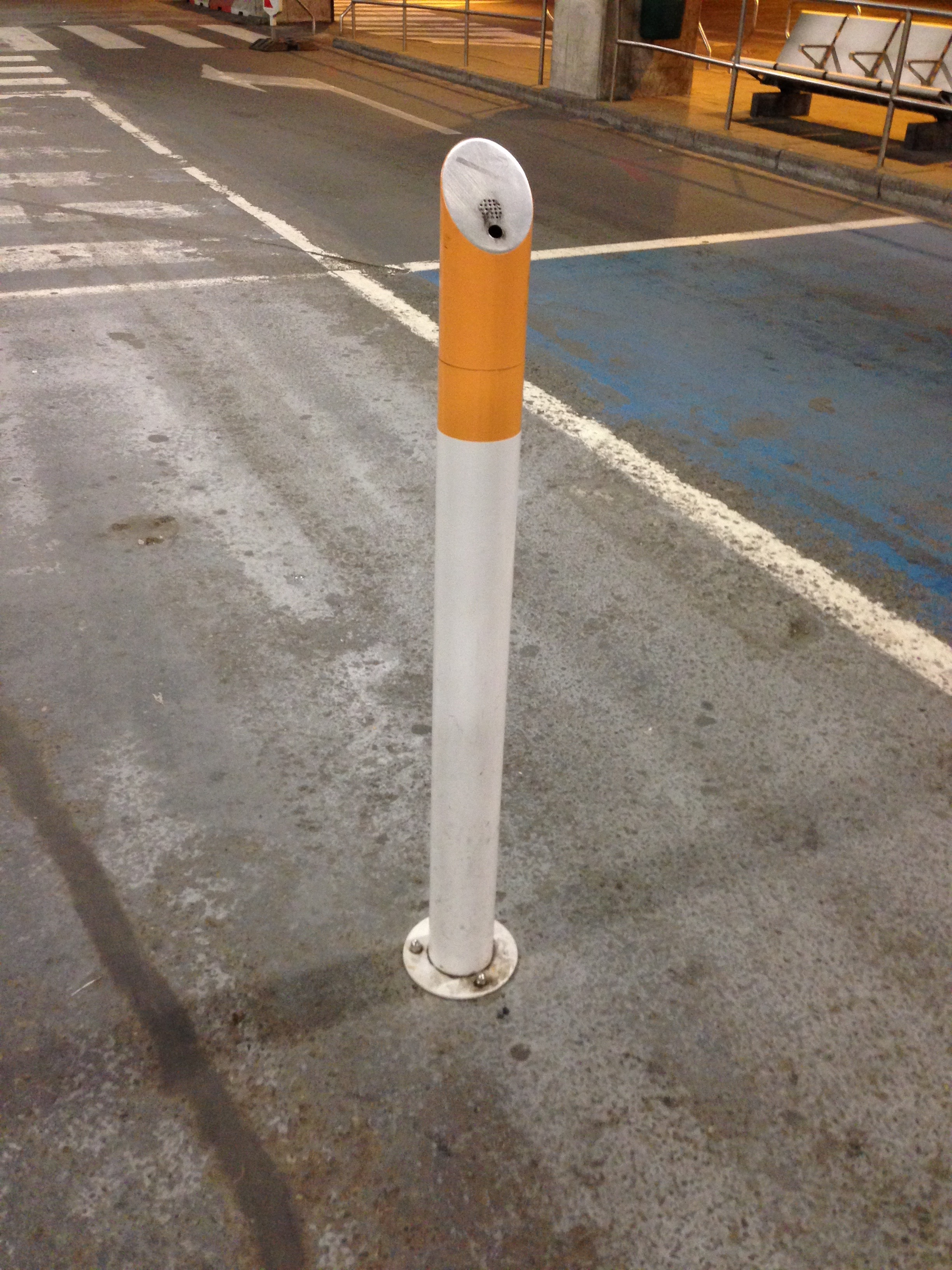
A bollard that also serves as an ashtray at Brussels Airport

== See also ==
- Cigarette receptacle
- Smoking
- Smoking culture
