= Punk in Brazil =

Punk scene in Brazil

Punk rock and hardcore punk in Brazil originated in the late 1970s, influenced by bands such as Sex Pistols, The Clash, Stiff Little Fingers, and The Ramones. The first known Brazilian punk rock band was Restos de Nada ("remains of nothing"), which appeared in mid-1978 and set the stage for the emergence of many other bands that formed the Brazilian punk scene.

From 1980 to 1985, São Paulo became a notable hub of Brazilian punk music, featuring bands like Cólera, Olho Seco, Garotos Podres, Lobotomia, Mercenárias (an all-female band) and Ratos de Porão. While in São Paulo the scene leaned toward raw punk and hardcore, Brasília's punk rock bands were closer to new wave: Aborto Elétrico, Legião Urbana, Capital Inicial, and Plebe Rude were some well-known bands from the capital. Punk gang violence during these years influenced sonic changes later in the decade. For example, Inocentes and Mercenárias took a more post punk direction, while Ratos de Porão and Lobotomia incorporated influences from thrash metal.

In the 1990s, the revival of straight edge and riot grrrl cultures rejuvenated Brazil's punk and hardcore scene, especially in the state of São Paulo. Influential underground names like No Violence, Safari Hamburguers, Abuso Sonoro, Point of No Return, Dominatrix, Calibre 12 and Nitrominds pushed the scene forward. In other parts of Brazil, bands including DFC and Raimundos from Brasília, Devotos do Ódio from Recife, Pastel De Miolos, Bosta Rala from Bahia and Mukeka di Rato, Deltree and Dead Fish from Espírito Santo gained recognition. In contrast to bands of the 1980s, most of these new bands sang in English.

== Late 1970s ==
The origins of punk rock in Brazil date back to the late 1970s. As in most other countries, the influence of the Sex Pistols, The Clash and The Ramones sparked the movement. Nonetheless, São Paulo was heavily influenced by lesser-known bands such as Speedtwins from the Netherlands, as well as by earlier protopunk artists such as The MC5, Iggy & The Stooges and The New York Dolls. Punk was initially adopted and fostered by musician Douglas Viscaino. With his band Restos de Nada which began playing in 1978, Viscaino promoted revolutionary ideas and brought young people together against the Brazilian military regime. The late 70s witnessed the fast-growing interest of punk nationwide: pioneer bands AI-5 and N.A.I. (later known as Condutores de Cadáver) sprouted in São Paulo, Carne Podre in Curitiba and Aborto Elétrico in Brasília.

Before Brazil's contemporary punk groups came along, two relatively famous glam/hard rock bands, Joelho de Porco and Made in Brazil, helped promote elements of the punk aesthetic around 1977. Both bands were important to the early days of Brazilian punk, offering a new alternative to the MPB and progressive rock artists that dominated the country's music scene at the time. Joelho de Porco, whose lyrics bore a strong influence from São Paulo's urban environment, became highly influential.

== Early 1980s ==
In 1979, Fábio Sampaio, who would become the singer in Olho Seco, started a record shop in downtown São Paulo named Punk Rock Discos. This shop would become the main focus and meeting spot for the city's punk scene in the years to come, helping unite otherwise isolated gangs, bands and individuals from different parts of the city and therefore creating a proper movement.

Punk Rock Discos also gave the São Paulo scene a distinctively hardcore musical identity through the records and tapes distributed at the shop. By 1980 or 1981, Sampaio had found international connections and had established unorthodox methods to import records from England and have them available shortly after they were released abroad.

However, since most punks could not afford imported vinyl, the shop would make mixtapes with what Sampaio considered to be the best material and sell the cassettes for a lower cost. Partially due to Sampaio's personal taste, British bands like Discharge and Disorder as well as Swedish and Finnish hardcore soon became the main reference for São Paulo punks, being listened to almost immediately after the records came out in their countries of origin.

Around 1981, punk gigs were already happening often around São Paulo where there were already dozens of active bands, mostly playing hardcore punk and similar styles. Most important among these bands were Cólera, Olho Seco and Inocentes. These three bands appeared on the Grito Suburbano compilation LP released in early 1982.

Grito Suburbano's example was soon followed by the band Lixomania, who put out their own EP in the same year as well as Ratos de Porão, Psykoze and Fogo Cruzado, who took part (with Cólera appearing on vinyl for the second time) in another compilation LP called SUB released roughly one year after Grito Suburbano.

In late 1982, the first big punk festival was organized. Named O Começo do Fim do Mundo ("The Beginning of the End of the World") it included most of the more active bands from São Paulo city and the neighboring ABCD Region. A live recording of the show came out on vinyl the following year.

São Paulo also had a thriving post-punk scene in the early 1980s with bands like Agentss, Mercenárias, Ira!, Voluntários da Pátria, Akira S, Fellini, Smack and others playing often around the city. Despite sharing political and cultural values, the (hardcore) punk and post-punk bands had little else in common at this point, with wide musical and class gaps separating the two scenes. While the self-identified punks were usually teenagers from working class areas who worked as office boys or factory workers, the post-punks were mostly middle class young adults with university educations. Bands from the two scenes rarely, if ever, played together on the same bills. Among other reasons, because very few venues would let hardcore punk bands play.

Meanwhile, the scene in Brasília was also growing. After the first local band Aborto Elétrico began playing gigs in 1980, other groups emerged, such as Blitx 64 and Plebe Rude. However, as the decade went on, most of the Brasília bands drifted towards post-punk and new wave.

Rio de Janeiro also had a productive punk scene in the early 1980s. Started by a gang of skateboarders from the working class Campo Grande district, Rio punk revolved around bands such as Coquetel Molotov, Descarga Suburbana and Eutanásia.

In 1984, inspired by the urgency of the message in the legendary Grito Suburbano album, the very first punk rock band from Porto Alegre was formed, Pupilas Dilatadas. Notably, the band were not entirely influenced by other Brazilian punk outfits of the time, playing songs with slower tempos, more in tune with bands like Public Image Ltd or Killing Joke than with more hardcore artists. Their sound was an original mix of post-punk, California hardcore and experimental sounds. From the same time period, is the band Lixo Urbano who played traditional punk music inspired by bands like the Sex Pistols. These two punk bands are regarded as pioneers of the Punk movement in Porto Alegre.

== Mid-late 1980s ==
In São Paulo, by 1984 police harassment and violence among punk gangs made shows a virtual impossibility almost killing the São Paulo scene as a whole. As a reaction some bands began changing their sound and seeking refuge in other scenes. Bands like Inocentes, (female band)Mercenárias and 365 (formed by ex-members of Lixomania, Fogo Cruzado, Ratos de Porão and Inocentes) took a post punk direction, while others such as Ratos de Porão and Lobotomia went towards the thrash metal/crossover scenes.

In spite of such casualties, 1985 and 1986 were good years for rock music in Brazil as a whole and this gain was also reflected in the punk scene. Popular and long lasting bands like Garotos Podres, Republika, Lobotomia, Armagedom, Grinders, Virus 27 and others came up around this time, launched by the Ataque Sonoro compilation LP, that also included Rio de Janeiro bands Desordeiros, Spermogramix and Auschwitz.

In the southern region of the country, the city of Porto Alegre had developed a significant scene by the mid-1980s, with locals Replicantes achieving national success, a major record deal and even some FM radio airplay. Another significant band from Porto Alegre during the mid-late 1980s was Atraque, who were influenced more by California hardcore bands than by European punk, an atypical trait in Brazil at that time. The city's first punk band Pupilas Dilatadas remained active during this period, releasing an EP and participating in national compilations during the later part of the decade.

Meanwhile, in the nation's capital, Brasília, bands playing music closer to post-punk and new wave but tracing their roots to the early Brasília punk scene started putting out commercially successful records on major labels. The biggest names were Legião Urbana, Capital Inicial and Plebe Rude. The city, however, also had its own hardcore scene with bands such as BSBH and Detrito Federal closely resembling the rawer São Paulo style. In the later part of the decade, however, the punk scene faded from the radar, with fewer and fewer releases due to the economic crisis and hyperinflation. In São Paulo and other parts of the country, gang violence became a problem again, both between rival punk groups and against skinheads, metalheads and other groups. Murders were not uncommon and punk gigs became rare and dangerous.

In spite of the adverse conditions, some bands were able to make their mark and to release influential records during the late 1980s, such as Psychic Possessor, Lobotomia, Offensor. At the same time, an underground scene was starting to happen. More influenced by grindcore, British thrashcore and American hardcore than by earlier Brazilian punk, this new underground scene was planting the seeds to the new explosion that would take place in the following decade.

== 1990s-2000s ==
After the violent and relatively unproductive period in the late 1980s and first two years of the 1990s, the punk/hardcore scene gained momentum again in the new decade. Now including popular subgenres such as Pop Punk, Anarchopunk, straight edge and riot grrrl, the new decade was marked by big underground names such as No Violence, Safari Hamburguers, Abuso Sonoro, Execradores Point of No Return, Dominatrix, Calibre 12, Nitrominds and others in São Paulo, as well as DFC and Raimundos from Brasília, Devotos do Ódio from Recife, Bosta Rala and Pastel De Miolos from Bahia, Pinheads and Anões de Jardim in Curitiba, Mukeka di Rato and Dead Fish from Espírito Santo, DreadFull, Refer in Belo Horizonte and Pastilhas Polegarinas in Uberaba and so on. Unlike the 1980s norm, many 1990s bands sang in English.

Grindcore, noisecore and other related genres were also big, specially in the early 1990s, mainly through the efforts of underground fanzines and tape-trading, with bands like Rot, Trucidator from Bahia, Under Threat and others achieving some international impact.

After the 1990s rebirth and the creation of a strong and long lasting network of labels, venues and punk rock enthusiasts, the following decade saw the Brazilian Punk and Hardcore scenes become stable and productive as never before. Gang violence, arguably the main problem facing Brazilian punk in the 1980s, diminished to a point where it was almost unnoticeable for years, which allowed larger numbers than ever before to attend shows and participate in the scene.

In the first years of the new millennium, Brazilian thrashcore and related styles became very popular, both in and outside the country, with bands like Discarga, I Shot Cyrus, Infect, Histeria Coletiva, Sick Terror and others, touring and having records released in Europe, North America and other parts of the world. It was also marked by a renewed interest in the early days of the scene, with most of the classic bands from the early 1980s reuniting for special gigs and, in some cases, for good.

== Notable bands ==
- Cólera, Classic punk rock/hardcore, one of the pioneers of the genre in Brazil (1979 – still active)
- CPM 22, Melodic Hardcore/Pop Rock from São Paulo (1995 – still active)
- Charlie Brown Jr., Major label Skate Punk/Ska/Pop Rock from Santos (1992–2013)
- Dead Fish, Hardcore Punk from Vitória (1991 – still active)
- Garotos Podres, old punk/oi band from São Paulo (1982 – still active)
- Inocentes
- I Shot Cyrus, Thrash/Fastcore band from São Paulo- Members of Ratos de Porão (1997–2009)
- Kleiderman
- Legião Urbana
- Lobotomia, Hardcore/Crossover Thrash (1983–1992; active again in the 2000s)
- Matanza, Hardcore punk and country from Rio de Janeiro (1995 – 2018)
- Mercenárias
- Patife Band
- Plebe Rude, 80s post-punk from Brasília (1981 – still active)
- Point of No Return - Straight Edge Hardcore/Metalcore from São Paulo (1996–2006)
- Porcos Cegos (Blind Pigs) - Hardcore/Punk Rock from Barueri (1993 – still active)
- Raimundos - Major label Hardcore/Forrócore/pop rock from Brasília (1987 – still active)
- Ratos de Porão - Brazil's oldest and biggest hardcore/crossover band (1981 – still active)
- Smack
- Titãs

== See also ==
- Latino punk
