= Trashland =

Studio album by Mercenárias
- Released: 1988
- Recorded: 1987
- Genre: Post-punk, art punk
- Label: EMI
- Producer: Edgard Scandurra, Thomas Pappon

Mercenárias chronology
Cadê as Armas? (1986)	Trashland (1988)	The Beginning of the End of the World (2005)

Trashland is the second and last studio album by Brazilian post-punk band Mercenárias. It was released in 1988 via EMI, and produced by Edgard Scandurra (of Ira! and Ultraje a Rigor, and a long-time friend and former member of Mercenárias) and Thomas Pappon (of Voluntários da Pátria, Smack and Fellini fame). Contrasting with the aggressiveness of the punk-like sonority of their previous album, Cadê as Armas?, Trashland is characterized by more atmospheric pieces reminiscent of Siouxsie and the Banshees, with emphasis given to the tracks "Kyrie", "Angelus", "Mesmas Leis", "Lembranças" and "Provérbios do Inferno", a compilation of William Blake's Proverbs of Hell translated into Portuguese and set to music.

The album received critical acclaim, and was chosen as "Album of the Year" by magazine Bizz. Despite this, EMI fired the band for no apparent reason, leading to its end in the same year and an 18-year hiatus before their reunion in 2006.

== Track listing ==
No.	Title	Lyrics	Length
1.	"Lembranças" (Memories)	Rosália Munhoz	3:06
2.	"Há Dez Anos Passados" (Ten Years Ago)	Edgard Scandurra	1:57
3.	"Somos Milhões" (We Are Millions)	Rosália Munhoz	2:27
4.	"Tempo sem História" (Time Without History)	Sandra Coutinho	1:35
5.	"Ação na Cidade" (Action in the City)	Sandra Coutinho	1:39
6.	"Matinê" (Matinée)	Instrumental	2:15
7.	"Mesmas Leis" (The Same Laws)	Sandra Coutinho	2:24
8.	"Cadê as Armas?" (Where Are the Weapons?)	Rosália Munhoz	2:35
9.	"Provérbios do Inferno" (Proverbs of Hell)	William Blake	2:18
10.	"Kyrie"	Rosália Munhoz	2:30
11.	"Angelus"	Rosália Munhoz	2:38
12.	"Trashland"	Rosália Munhoz	2:17

== Personnel ==
- Ana Machado – guitar
- Lourdes "Lou" Moreira – drums
- Rosália Munhoz – vocals
- Sandra Coutinho – bass
- Bocato – trombone (track 10)
- Edgard Scandurra – guitar (tracks 2, 3 and 7)
- Thomas Pappon – piano (track 12)
- Silvano Michelino – percussion (tracks 1, 7, 8, 9, 10 and 11)
- Michel Spitale – cover art
