= The Beginning of the End of the World =

Compilation album by Mercenárias
- Released: 2005
- Recorded: 1986–1988
- Genre: Post-punk, punk rock, art punk
- Label: Soul Jazz Records

Mercenárias chronology
Trashland (1988)	The Beginning of the End of the World (2005)	Demo 1983 (2015)

The Beginning of the End of the World is a compilation album by Brazilian post-punk band Mercenárias, released in 2005 by British record label Soul Jazz Records. It features a selection of tracks of their two studio albums, Cadê as Armas? (1986) and Trashland (1988).

The album's name alludes to the Brazilian music festival O Começo do Fim do Mundo, that happened in 1982 and promoted many underground punk bands such as Ratos de Porão, Inocentes and Cólera, among others.

No.	Title	Originally from	Length
1.	"Me Perco Nesse Tempo"	Cadê as Armas?	1:18
2.	"Polícia"	Cadê as Armas?	0:59
3.	"Imagem"	Cadê as Armas?	1:48
4.	"Inimigo"	Cadê as Armas?	1:27
5.	"Pânico"	Cadê as Armas?	1:53
6.	"Amor Inimigo"	Cadê as Armas?	1:56
7.	"Loucos Sentimentos"	Cadê as Armas?	1:30
8.	"Labirintos"	Cadê as Armas?	2:15
9.	"Além Acima"	Cadê as Armas?	2:33
10.	"Santa Igreja"	Cadê as Armas?	2:02
11.	"Lembranças"	Trashland	3:06
12.	"Há Dez Anos Passados"	Trashland	1:57
13.	"Somos Milhões"	Trashland	2:27
14.	"Ação na Cidade"	Trashland	1:39
15.	"Kyrie"	Trashland	2:30
16.	"Trashland"	Trashland	2:17
