= Noite e Dia =

Studio album by Smack
- Released: 1986
- Genre: Post-punk, punk rock, garage rock
- Label: Baratos Afins
- Producer: Luiz Calanca

Smack chronology
Ao Vivo no Mosh (1985)	Noite e Dia (1986)	3 (2008)

Noite e Dia (Portuguese for Night and Day) is the second and last studio album by Brazilian post-punk band Smack. It was released in 1986 by Baratos Afins.

It is the only Smack release to not feature Edgard Scandurra, since he left the band in the same year in order to give more focus to his alternate band Ira!. He returned to Smack when they reunited in 2005, however. It was also the band's last release to feature Thomas Pappon, since he moved to England in the mid-1990s; he would not partake on the band's reunion.

== Track listing ==
All tracks are written by Smack.

No.	Title	English title	Length
1.	"Abertura" (instrumental)	Overture	1:40
2.	"Pequena Dissonância"	Small Dissonance	1:54
3.	"Não Enlouqueça"	Don't Get Crazy	3:28
4.	"Cavalos"	Horses	1:59
5.	"Rádio Smack" (instrumental)	Smack Radio	1:48
6.	"Sete Nomes"	Seven Names	2:42
7.	"Desafinado"	Tuneless	2:09
8.	"Just Reality"		2:47
9.	"Noite e Dia"	Night and Day	2:40

== Personnel ==
- Sérgio "Pamps" Pamplona — vocals, guitar
- Thomas Pappon — drums
- Sandra Coutinho — bass
