= Pequeno Cidadão =

- Origin: São Paulo, São Paulo
- Genres: Pop rock; Children's music; Brazilian popular music
- Labels: Rosa Celeste; Flerte Fatal; MCD
- Members: Edgard Scandurra; Taciana Barros; Antonio Pinto
- Past members: Arnaldo Antunes
- Website: www.pequenocidadao.com

Pequeno Cidadão (Portuguese for Little Citizen) is a Brazilian rock band founded in São Paulo by Arnaldo Antunes, Taciana Barros, Edgard Scandurra, and Antonio Pinto, as well as their children.

In 2008, the members decided to record with their children; shortly after working in the studio, in June 2009, they released their first CD, self-titled Pequeno Cidadão. In 2012, Arnaldo Antunes left the group to pursue his solo career.

== History ==
The musical project was spearheaded by Arnaldo Antunes, Edgard Scandurra, Taciana Barros, and Antonio Pinto in 2008. The musicians, already well known in the 1980s, reconnected when their young children were enrolled in the same school. They attended the same parties and sang the songs they wrote for their children at these parties. They decided to compile these songs into an album and formed the band.

The group initially released the songs on their Myspace page, where they were a hit, and then recorded and released their first studio album, the self-titled ‘’Pequeno Cidadão‘’, released in 2009 by Arnaldo's record label, Rosa Celeste. Mixing elements of pop rock and psychedelic rock with a repertoire focused on the daily lives of those who have children, the album was well received by the media and critics, and they soon embarked on their first tour, bringing to the stages of large theaters a lively and colorful show, tailor-made for parents and children.

Shortly thereafter, this resulted in the release of a DVD and two books: ‘'A Viagem Fantástica do Pequeno Cidadão’' (The Fantastic Journey of the Little Citizen) and ‘'Tchau Chupeta’' (Bye Bye Pacifier).

In 2012, two tracks from the first CD were selected as the soundtrack for the soap opera ‘’Carrossel‘’. The song “Pequeno Cidadão” was included in the soundtrack and on the DVD ‘’Carrossel Video Hits‘’.

At the end of 2012, the band's second CD, ‘'Pequeno Cidadão 2’' (Little Citizen 2), was released.

In 2013, it was also selected as the soundtrack for the new version of ‘'Chiquititas’'. The song selected was “Meu Anjinho” (My Little Angel).

== Members ==
- Edgard Scandurra founded the band Ira! in 1981 alongside singer Nasi. He was also a member of Ultraje a Rigor for four years.
- Taciana Barros was a member of the band Gang 90 e as Absurdettes. Taciana is the mother of Daniel Barros Scandurra and Luzia Barros.
- Antonio Pinto is the son of cartoonist Ziraldo. He is the composer of several soundtracks for Brazilian films.

== Discography ==
=== Studio albums ===
- ‘’Pequeno Cidadão‘’ (2009)
- ‘'Pequeno Cidadão 2’' (2012)
- ‘'Pequeno Cidadão - Karaokê Rock’n’Roll’' (2013)
- ‘'Vem Dançar’' (2016)

=== Videography ===
- ‘'Little Citizen’' (2010)

== Awards ==
| Year | Award | Work | Result |
|---|---|---|---|
| 2012 | International Short Film Festival | “Bonequinha do Papai” | India |
