= Você Nem Imagina =

Compilation album by Fellini
- Released: December 6, 2010
- Recorded: 2010
- Genre: Alternative rock, post-punk
- Label: Tratore/Fonomatic
- Producer: Thomas Pappon and Fellini

Fellini chronology
Amanhã É Tarde (2002)	Você Nem Imagina (2010)

Cadão Volpato chronology
Tudo que Eu Quero Dizer Tem que Ser no Ouvido (2005)	Você Nem Imagina (2010)

Você Nem Imagina (Portuguese for You Can't Even Imagine) is a compilation album by Brazilian band Fellini. It was released on December 6, 2010, by Fonomatic, a subsidiary of independent record label-distributor Tratore. It features re-recordings of some of Fellini's previous songs, ranging from their 1985 debut album O Adeus de Fellini to 1990's Amor Louco. It is the band's last album before they broke up again.

The album's cover was illustrated by Cadão Volpato.

The album's name is a reference to a verse on Fellini's song "Rock Europeu".

== Track listing ==
All lyrics by Cadão Volpato, all music composed by Jair Marcos, Thomas Pappon, Ricardo Salvagni and Cadão Volpato

No.	Title	Original release	Length
1.	"Massacres da Coletivização"	3 Lugares Diferentes (1987)	3:49
2.	"Clepsidra"	Amor Louco (1990)	3:18
3.	"Nada"	O Adeus de Fellini (1985)	2:47
4.	"LSD"	Amor Louco (1990)	3:14
5.	"Ambos Mundos"	3 Lugares Diferentes (1987)	3:16
6.	"Funziona Senza Vapore"	O Adeus de Fellini (1985)	2:18
7.	"Chico Buarque Song"	Amor Louco (1990)	4:44
8.	"Pai"	3 Lugares Diferentes (1987)	1:48
9.	"Zum Zum Zum Zazoeira"	3 Lugares Diferentes (1987)	6:02
10.	"Teu Inglês"	3 Lugares Diferentes (1987)	3:31
11.	"Rock Europeu"	O Adeus de Fellini (1985)	3:51

== Personnel ==
Fellini

- Cadão Volpato — vocals
- Jair Marcos — guitar, backing vocals
- Ricardo Salvagni — bass
- Thomas Pappon — guitar, backing vocals

Guest musicians

- Clayton Martins — drum

Miscellaneous staff

- Recorded by Rainer Pappon Studio in Paris, São Paulo, on August 21, 2009
- Mixed by Thomas Pappon in Sunray Garage, London, October / November 2009
- Produced by Thomas Pappon and Fellini
