= Ao Vivo no Mosh =

Studio album by Smack
- Released: 1985
- Studio: Mosh Studios
- Genre: Post-punk, punk rock, garage rock
- Label: Baratos Afins
- Producer: Luiz Calanca

Smack chronology
Ao Vivo no Mosh (1985)	Noite e Dia (1986)

Ao Vivo no Mosh (Portuguese for Live at the Mosh) is the debut album by Brazilian post-punk band Smack. Recorded live at the Estúdios Mosh in São Paulo (albeit without an audience), it was released in 1985 by Baratos Afins.

== Track listing ==
All tracks are written by Smack

No.	Title	English title	Length
1.	"Fora Daqui"	Out of Here	2:50
2.	"Onde Li"	Where I Read It	2:27
3.	"Clone"		1:43
4.	"Desespero Juvenil"	Juvenile Despair	1:26
5.	"№ 4"		2:09
6.	"16 Horas e Pouco"	16 O'Clock and Something	2:26
7.	"Limite Eternidade"	Limit Eternity	1:26
8.	"Faça umas Compras"	Do Some Shopping	1:57
9.	"Chance de Fuga" (instrumental)	Chance to Escape	2:07
10.	"Mediocridade Afinal"	Mediocrity After All	4:01

"Fora Daqui" and "Mediocridade Afinal" were later re-released in the compilation album The Sexual Life of the Savages, released by Soul Jazz Records in 2005.

== Reception ==
Ao Vivo no Mosh has been described as "a bouncingly vigorous slice of vinyl from Brazil's seldom exposed underground" by Spin columnist Andrea Enthal. Although originally well received by rock audiences, the album is now considered an obscurity and a collector's item. The album has been compared to the eponymous debut album by Legião Urbana, which was also released in 1985 and is considered a milestone in the Brazilian post-punk scene of the 1980s.

== Personnel ==
- Sérgio "Pamps" Pamplona — vocals, guitar
- Thomas Pappon — drums
- Sandra Coutinho — bass
- Edgard Scandurra — guitar
