= Cadão Volpato =

Brazilian musician, artist, journalist and writer

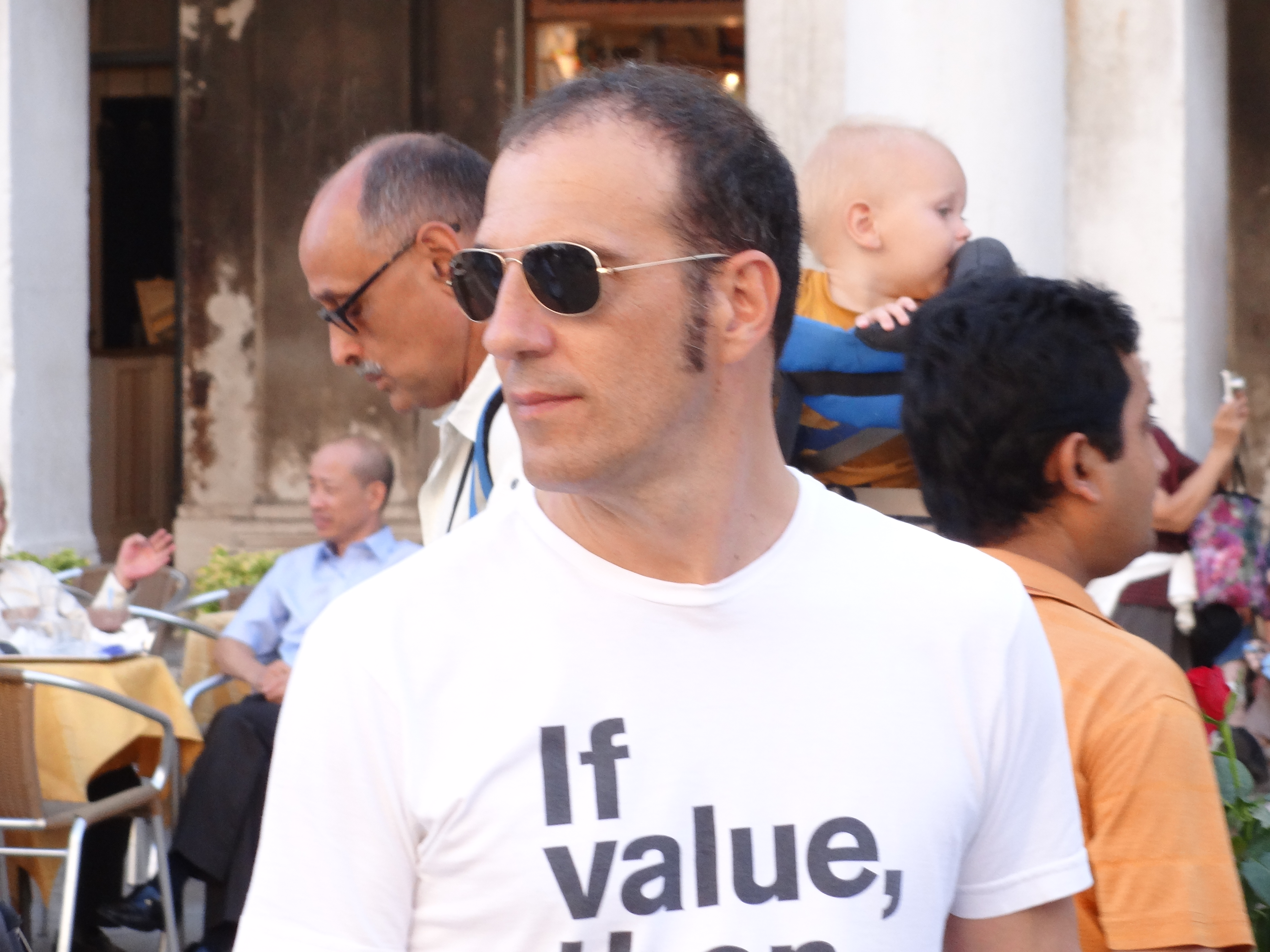
- Volpato during a trip to Italy, in 2011

Background information
- Born: Carlos Adão Volpato; December 28, 1956 (age 69); São Paulo, Brazil
- Genres: Post-punk, art rock, alternative rock, experimental rock
- Occupations: Singer-songwriter, journalist, writer, artist
- Instruments: Vocals, harmonica
- Years active: 1984–present
- Labels: Baratos Afins, Wop-Bop Records, Midsummer Madness, Outros Discos
- Formerly of: Fellini, Funziona Senza Vapore, Pappon & Volpato
- Website: cadaovolpato.com.br

Carlos Adão "Cadão" Volpato (born December 28, 1956) is a Brazilian musician, artist, journalist and writer. He is best known for being the frontman of cult post-punk band Fellini.

== Biography ==
Cadão Volpato was born in São Paulo in 1956, and graduated in Journalism at the ECA-USP and in social science at the FFLCH-USP. His first job was in 1984, at the magazine Veja as a text reviser. Also in 1984 he founded the band Fellini, alongside Thomas Pappon, Jair Marcos, Ricardo Salvagni and Celso Pucci, also known as "Minho K." (who only played with the band once).

After Fellini's first break-up in 1990 (due to Thomas Pappon leaving Brazil to go live in Europe, and because Volpato wanted to focus on his intellectual career), he founded a "spiritual successor" to Fellini called Funziona Senza Vapore (in a reference to Fellini's most famous song), with the two original Fellini members plus Stela Campos replacing Pappon. They recorded in 1992 a homonymous album; however, it was only released ten years later.

In 2002, Cadão reformed Fellini and with them released two more albums before its second break-up in 2010. The band reunited once more in early 2016, for a limited series of shows across São Paulo.

In 2005, he released his first solo album, Tudo que Eu Quero Dizer Tem que Ser no Ouvido.

From 1991 to 1994, and again from 2010 to 2012 he hosted the program Metrópolis in TV Cultura (initial episodes with him also featured his then-girlfriend, Lorena Calábria).

He is also author of the short story books Ronda Noturna (1995), Dezembro de um Verão Maravilhoso (1999), Questionário (2005) and Relógio sem Sol (2007), and Meu Filho, Meu Besouro (2011), a children's poetry book that was also illustrated by him, and dedicated to his son. His sixth work, the novel Pessoas que Passam pelos Sonhos, was released in 2013; it was his first novel.

In 2014 he was nominated to the São Paulo Prize for Literature, in the "Best Book of the Year – Debut Authors Over 40" category, for Pessoas que Passam pelos Sonhos; however, he eventually lost the prize to Veronica Stigger's Opisanie swiata. 2015 saw the release of another children's work, the picture book Cavalos da Chuva. His eighth book, Os Discos do Crepúsculo, a collection of chronicles in which he comments about his favorite bands, singers and records, was released on March 27, 2017 through Numa Editora.

In 2015, Volpato reunited with former Fellini bandmate Thomas Pappon and formed the experimental rock duo Pappon & Volpato. They have uploaded three songs as of yet for their official SoundCloud page.

As of January 4, 2017, Volpato serves as the director of the Centro Cultural São Paulo, appointed by mayor João Doria.

Cadão has stated that he has used LSD, and that the Fellini song "LSD", off the album Amor Louco, was about his experiences with the drug.

He also illustrated the front cover to Fellini's albums Fellini Só Vive 2 Vezes and Você Nem Imagina, and to his own solo album.

== Discography ==
=== With Fellini ===
- O Adeus de Fellini (1985)
- Fellini Só Vive 2 Vezes (1986)
- 3 Lugares Diferentes (1987)
- Amor Louco (1990)
- Amanhã É Tarde (2002)
- Você Nem Imagina (2010)

=== With Funziona Senza Vapore ===
- Funziona Senza Vapore (recorded in 1992; released in 2002)

=== Solo ===
- Tudo que Eu Quero Dizer Tem que Ser no Ouvido (2005)

== Bibliography ==
- Ronda Noturna (1995)
- Dezembro de um Verão Maravilhoso (1999)
- Questionário (2005)
- Relógio Sem Sol (2007)
- Meu Filho, Meu Besouro (2011)
- Pessoas que Passam pelos Sonhos (2013)
- Cavalos da Chuva (2015)
- Os Discos do Crepúsculo (2017)
