= Cadê as Armas? =

Studio album by Mercenárias
- Released: 1986 (re-released in 1995)
- Recorded: 1984/1985
- Genre: Post-punk, art punk
- Label: Baratos Afins
- Producer: Luiz Calanca

Mercenárias chronology
Cadê as Armas? (1986)	Trashland (1988)

Cadê as Armas? (Portuguese for Where Are the Weapons?) is the debut album by Brazilian post-punk band Mercenárias. It was released in 1986 via famous independent record label Baratos Afins and re-released in CD form in 1995, with three live bonus tracks recorded in 1988, during a show that celebrated the 10-year anniversary of Baratos Afins.

João Gordo (of Ratos de Porão fame), Edgard Scandurra (formerly a member of Mercenárias, and more well known for his work with Ultraje a Rigor and Ira!) and Vange Leonel provide backing vocals in the track "Santa Igreja".

A music video was made for the track "Pânico", being the Mercenárias' only one.

An old drawing of the Argentinian coat of arms is depicted in the album's cover.

== Track listing ==
No.	Title	Lyrics	Music	English title	Length
1.	"Me Perco"	Ciça	Ana Machado, Sandra Coutinho	I Get Lost	1:22
2.	"Polícia"	Ana Machado	Ana Machado, Rosália Munhoz, Sandra Coutinho	Police	1:02
3.	"Imagem"	Sandra Coutinho	Edgard Scandurra, Sandra Coutinho	Image	1:50
4.	"Inimigo"	Ana Machado, Edgard Scandurra	Ana Machado, Edgard Scandurra, Sandra Coutinho	Enemy	1:31
5.	"Pânico"	Rosália Munhoz, Sandra Coutinho	Ana Machado, Lou Moreira, Rosália Munhoz, Sandra Coutinho	Panic	1:57
6.	"Amor Inimigo"	Lou Moreira	Ana Machado, Lou Moreira, Sandra Coutinho	Enemy Love	2:02
7.	"Loucos Sentimentos"	Rosália Munhoz	Ana Machado, Lou Moreira, Sandra Coutinho	Crazy Feelings	1:35
8.	"Labirintos"	Rosália Munhoz	Ana Machado, Sandra Coutinho	Mazes	2:22
9.	"Além Acima"	Rosália Munhoz	Ana Machado, Lou Moreira, Rosália Munhoz, Sandra Coutinho	Above and Beyond	2:38
10.	"Santa Igreja"	Sandra Coutinho	Ana Machado, Sandra Coutinho	Holy Church	2:12

1995 CD re-release bonus tracks
No.	Title	Length
11.	"Inimigo" (live in São Paulo, 5 February 1988)	1:34
12.	"Além Acima" (live in São Paulo, 5 February 1988)	2:36
13.	"Santa Igreja" (live in São Paulo, 5 February 1988)	2:04

=== Covers ===
Ira! covered "Me Perco Nesse Tempo" on their seventh studio album 7, released in 1996.

== Critical reception ==
On July 20, 2016, Rolling Stone Brazil chose Cadê as Armas? as the 5th best Brazilian punk rock album of all time.

== Personnel ==
- Ana Machado – guitar
- Lourdes "Lou" Moreira – drums
- Rosália Munhoz – vocals
- Sandra Coutinho – backing vocals, bass
- Edgard Scandurra – backing vocals (track 10), guitar (track 9), percussion (track 5)
- João Gordo – backing vocals (track 10)
- Peter Price – percussion (track 5)
- Marcinha Montserrath – backing vocals (track 10)
- Vange Leonel – backing vocals (track 10)
- Luiz Calanca – production
