= Vermelho =

EP by Vange Leonel
- Released: 1996
- Genre: Post-punk, alternative rock
- Length: 29:42
- Label: Medusa Records
- Producer: Cilmara Bedaque, Vange Leonel

Vange Leonel chronology
Vange (1991)	Vermelho (1996)

Vermelho (Portuguese for Red) is an EP and also the second and final release by Brazilian musician woman Vange Leonel. It came out in 1996 via independent label Medusa Records. Medusa Records was founded also in 1996, by Vange and her songwriting partner Cilmara Bedaque.

The album also counts with guest appearances by then-Titãs members Nando Reis and Charles Gavin (who were also featured on Leonel's previous album), and Edgard Scandurra, famous for his work with Ira!.

== Track listing ==
All lyrics are written by Cilmara Bedaque and Vange Leonel, except where noted.

No.	Title	Lyrics	Length
1.	"Eu Sei" (I Know)		4:15
2.	"Copo de Café" (Cup of Coffee)		3:59
3.	"Asas" (Wings)		4:24
4.	"Rabo de Sereia" (Mermaid's Tail)	Cilmara Bedaque, Fernando Figueiredo, Vange Leonel	3:39
5.	"Tô Fora" (I'm Out)		4:09
6.	"Meninas" (Girls)		5:26
7.	"Vermelho" (Red)		3:47

== Personnel ==
- Vange Leonel – vocals, rhythm guitar, production
- Nando Reis – bass guitar
- Charles Gavin – drums
- Edgard Scandurra – guitar
- Cilmara Bedaque – production
