= Vange (disambiguation) =

Vange or Vänge may refer to:

== People ==
- Vange Leonel (1963–2014), Brazilian singer-songwriter, novelist, playwright, feminist and LGBT activist
- Vange Milliet (1967–), Brazilian singer-songwriter and photographer

== Locations ==
- Vange, a former village in England currently subsumed within the urban area of the Basildon borough of Essex
- Vänge, a locality situated in Uppsala County in Sweden, previously known as Brunna
- Vänge, Gotland, a settlement on Gotland, Sweden

== Music ==
- Vange (album), the debut album by Vange Leonel (see above), released in 1991
