= Smack (Brazilian band) =

Brazilian music band

- Origin: São Paulo, Brazil
- Genres: Post-punk, garage rock, punk rock, experimental rock
- Years active: 1983–1986; 2005–2015
- Labels: Baratos Afins, Midsummer Madness
- Past members: Sérgio Pamplona; Sandra Coutinho; Edgard Scandurra; Thomas Pappon

Smack was a Brazilian post-punk band from São Paulo, formed in 1983 and characterized by its raw and experimental instrumentation heavily influenced by Gang of Four, Talking Heads, Os Mutantes and The Jam, among others.

The band ended in 1986, but reunited in 2005. It ceased activities definitely in 2015 after vocalist Sérgio Pamplona's death.

== History ==
Smack was founded in São Paulo in 1983, after a meeting between Sandra Coutinho (who was also a founding member of Cabine C and the all-female band Mercenárias), Sérgio "Pamps" Pamplona (a former member of Itamar Assumpção's band Isca de Polícia and one-time collaborator for short-lived rock band Kleiderman), Edgard Scandurra (of Ira!) and Thomas Pappon (who was also playing with Voluntários da Pátria at the time, and would later join Fellini). The band's debut album, Ao Vivo no Mosh, was released in 1985 via famous independent label Baratos Afins; the band recorded it live in the Estúdios Mosh (albeit with no audience), hence the album's name. Pamps originally intended to record a proper live album, but budget constraints did not allow him to do so.

In order to focus more on his then-new band Ira!, Edgard Scandurra left Smack in 1986. Now a trio, the band recorded their second and last full-length album, Noite e Dia, in the same year. It was also released by Baratos Afins.

Some time after the release of Noite e Dia, Smack disbanded, with Thomas quoting the reason as being "Pamps' lack of interest on continuing the band", as well as lack of promotion and some personal problems.

19 years later, Smack reunited, albeit without Thomas Pappon (since he moved to Europe in 1990), and performed in some venues around Brazil, with Pitchu Ferraz replacing him as drummer. Two of their songs, "Fora Daqui" and "Mediocridade Afinal", would be also included in the compilation The Sexual Life of the Savages, released by Soul Jazz Records.

In 2008, they released the extended play 3, via carioca independent label Midsummer Madness. It was their first release in 22 years.

The band ended again on November 5, 2015, after Pamps' death due to cirrhosis. He was 62 years old.

== Discography ==
=== Studio albums ===
| Year | Album |
|---|---|
| 1985 | Ao Vivo no Mosh: Label: Baratos Afins; Format: Vinyl, CD |
| 1986 | Noite e Dia: Label: Baratos Afins; Format: Vinyl, CD |

=== Extended plays ===
| Year | Album |
|---|---|
| 2008 | 3: Label: Midsummer Madness; Format: CD |

=== Compilations ===
| Year | Album |
|---|---|
| 2005 | The Sexual Life of the Savages: Label: Soul Jazz Records; Format: CD; Contributed with the songs "Fora Daqui" and "Mediocridade Afinal" |

== Members ==
- Sandra Coutinho – bass (1983–1986, 2005–2015)
- Edgard Scandurra – guitar (1983–1986, 2005–2015)
- Sérgio "Pamps" Pamplona – vocals, guitar (1983–1986, 2005–2015; died 2015)
- Thomas Pappon – drums (1983–1986)

=== Session/live musicians ===
- Pitchu Ferraz – drums (2005–2008)
