= 3 Lugares Diferentes =

Studio album by Fellini
- Released: 1987 (re-released in 1995)
- Recorded: 1987
- Genre: Post-punk
- Label: Baratos Afins
- Producer: Luiz Calanca

Fellini chronology
Fellini Só Vive 2 Vezes (1986)	3 Lugares Diferentes (1987)	Amor Louco (1990)

Cadão Volpato chronology
Fellini Só Vive 2 Vezes (1986)	3 Lugares Diferentes (1987)	Amor Louco (1990)

3 Lugares Diferentes (Portuguese for 3 Different Places) is the third studio album by Brazilian post-punk band Fellini. It was released in 1987, and was their last album to be released under the Baratos Afins imprint. Fans (and as well as Cadão Volpato himself) consider this to be Fellini's best album. It was also re-released in CD form in 1995 (like the two previous Fellini albums).

Although Ricardo Salvagni returned to Fellini in this album (both him and guitarist Jair Marcos were absent from the band during the recording of the previous album), Jair Marcos did not, and thus was temporarily replaced by Thomas Pappon's brother Tancred.

Original founding Fellini member Minho K. (real name: Celso Pucci) provides some backing vocals in this album.

The track "Pai" opens with excerpts of narration by famous English disc-jockey John Peel.

== Track listing ==
All lyrics are written by Cadão Volpato; all music is composed by Thomas Pappon, Ricardo Salvagni and Cadão Volpato.

No.	Title	English title	Length
1.	"Ambos Mundos"	Both Worlds	4:09
2.	"Rosas"	Roses	3:37
3.	"La Paz Song"		2:34
4.	"Teu Inglês"	Your English	3:35
5.	"Zum Zum Zum Zazoeira"		5:35
6.	"Pai"	Father	3:29
7.	"Valsa de la Revolución"	Revolution Waltz	1:58
8.	"Massacres da Coletivização"	The Massacres of Collectivization	3:02
9.	"Rio-Bahia/Lavorare Stanca"		5:15
10.	"Onde o Sol se Esconde"	Where the Sun Is Hiding	3:39

1995 CD re-release bonus tracks
No.	Title	Length
11.	"Zum Zum Zum Zazoeira" (live)	5:23
12.	"Ambos Mundos" (live)	3:10
13.	"Teu Inglês/Aeroporto" (live)	16:28

== Notes ==
- "Teu Inglês" is also present in the compilation Não Wave, alongside another Fellini track, "Funziona Senza Vapore".
- "Zum Zum Zum Zazoeira" is also present in the compilation The Sexual Life of the Savages, alongside another Fellini track, "Rock Europeu".
- The live bonus tracks of the CD re-release were recorded in 1988, during a show that celebrated the 10-year anniversary of their record label, Baratos Afins.

== Personnel ==
Fellini

- Thomas Pappon — guitar
- Cadão Volpato — vocals, harmonica
- Ricardo Salvagni — keyboards

Additional personnel

- Tancred Pappon — guitar (on tracks 2, 8, 10)
- Silvano Michelino — percussion (on tracks 4, 5, 9)
- Minho K. — backing vocals (on track 4)
- Sweet Walter — backing vocals (on track 4)

Miscellaneous staff

- Recorded on January 87 in audio design a studio port of 4 channels Tancred Pappon except (track 7) recorded on August 86 in Mitzu's Toilet
- Mixed at Viceversa (sound engineer: Nico Bloise) and the Corda Toda (sound engineer: Paulé)
- Tapes — sugar blue, axel sommerfeld, john peel and osmar santos
- Fellini and Sweet Walter — cover (final art)
- Signore Volpato — drawing
- Fellini — arrangements
- Luiz Carlos Calanca and Fellini — production
- Luiz Carlos Calanca and Paulo Torres — remastering (cd version)
- Thank you again, tancred and thank you beto again
- One production Baratos Afins
