= Midsummer Madness =

Midsummer Madness may refer to:

- Midsummer Madness (record label), a Brazilian independent record label
- Midsummer Madness (1921 film), an American silent drama film
- Midsummer Madness (2007 film), a film telling 6 different stories
- "Midsummer Madness" (song), a 2018 hip hop song by 88rising
