= Tudo que Eu Quero Dizer Tem que Ser no Ouvido =

Studio album by Cadão Volpato
- Released: April 4, 2005
- Recorded: Estúdio Quadrophenia and Estudio del Bojo, São Paulo; September 2003, September 2004
- Genre: Art rock, alternative rock, indie rock
- Label: Outros Discos
- Producer: Cadão Volpato, Maurício Bussab

Cadão Volpato chronology
Funziona Senza Vapore (2002)	Tudo que Eu Quero Dizer Tem que Ser no Ouvido (2005)	Você Nem Imagina (2010)

Professional ratings
Review scores
Source	Rating
Laboratório Pop	link

Tudo que Eu Quero Dizer Tem que Ser no Ouvido (Portuguese for Everything I Want to Tell You Has to Be Whispered on Your Ear) is the debut solo studio album by Brazilian musician Cadão Volpato, famous for his work with post-punk band Fellini. It was released on April 4, 2005 via Brazilian independent label Outros Discos, and recorded in two sessions: one in the Estúdio Quadrophenia in September 2003 and the other at the Estudio del Bojo in September 2004.

According to the album's liner notes, the album is dedicated to Volpato's wife, Dani Bianchi.

== Track listing ==
All tracks are written by Cadão Volpato

No.	Title	English title	Length
1.	"Tudo que Ele Faz Não Faz Ela Rir" (instrumental)	Everything He Does Can't Make Her Laugh	1:41
2.	"Até Amanhã"	Until Tomorrow	3:15
3.	"Carrossel"	Carousel	3:20
4.	"Ela e os Beatles"	She and the Beatles	2:26
5.	"O Espinho"	The Thorn	2:18
6.	"O Impossível"	The Impossible	2:28
7.	"Aurora do Samba"	Dawn of the Samba	2:04
8.	"Pedindo Amor"	Asking for Love	1:59
9.	"Pensamentos São Livres"	Thoughts Are Free	1:47
10.	"Hino da Minha Bandeira"	Anthem of My Flag	3:49

== Reception ==
Laboratório Pop gave the album 3 out of 5 stars, praising Volpato's "interesting allusions to works of cinema, plastic arts and popular music", but criticized its "lack of texture" saying that "the CD is nothing but a sketch of good songs that would be better executed by Fellini".

== Personnel ==
- Cadão Volpato — vocals, all instruments, cover art, production
- Maurício Bussab — production, mixing
- Paola Bianchi — art direction
- Dani Bianchi — photos
- Sandro Garcia — "cosmic guitar" (on track 10)
