= O Adeus de Fellini =

Studio album by Fellini
- Released: 1985 (re-released in 1995)
- Recorded: late 1984/early 1985
- Genre: Post-punk
- Label: Baratos Afins
- Producer: Luiz Calanca

Fellini chronology
O Adeus de Fellini (1985)	Fellini Só Vive 2 Vezes (1986)

Cadão Volpato chronology
O Adeus de Fellini (1985)	Fellini Só Vive 2 Vezes (1986)

O Adeus de Fellini (Portuguese for Fellini's Farewell) is the debut album by Brazilian post-punk band Fellini. It was released in 1985 via the independent record label Baratos Afins and re-released in CD form in 1995, with an additional live track.

According to the band's frontman Cadão Volpato, the album's name is a nod to the English post-punk band The Durutti Column's 1980 debut, The Return of the Durutti Column.

The track "Outro Endereço, Outra Vida" features samples of English disc jockey John Peel's voice.

"Zäune" is sung by Thomas Pappon, entirely in German.

== Track listing ==
All lyrics are written by Cadão Volpato (except where noted); all music is composed by Jair Marcos, Thomas Pappon, Ricardo Salvagni and Cadão Volpato.

No.	Title	English title	Length
1.	"Funziona Senza Vapore"	It Works without Steam	2:26
2.	"Rock Europeu"	European Rock	3:44
3.	"História do Fogo"	The History of Fire	3:23
4.	"Cultura"	Culture	2:41
5.	"Outro Endereço, Outra Vida"	Another Address, Another Life	3:16
6.	"Bolero" (instrumental)		1:47
7.	"Bolero 2"		3:01
8.	"Shiva! Shiva!"		2:44
9.	"Nada"	Nothing	2:36
10.	"Zäune" (Thomas Pappon)	Fences	2:48

1995 CD re-release bonus track
No.	Title	Length
11.	"Nada" (live)	2:46

== Notes ==
- "Funziona Senza Vapore" is also present in the compilation Não Wave, alongside another Fellini track, "Teu Inglês". It is also the name of a side project formed by Fellini's frontman Cadão Volpato in 1992.
- "Rock Europeu" is also present in the compilation The Sexual Life of the Savages, alongside another Fellini track, "Zum Zum Zum Zazoeira".

== Personnel ==
Fellini

- Cadão Volpato — lead vocals (on tracks 1–9)
- Jair Marcos — acoustic and electric guitars
- Ricardo Salvagni — drums
- Thomas Pappon — bass, other instruments, lead vocals (on track 10)

Additional personnel

- Guinho — trumpet (on tracks 2, 6)
- Leonor — cello (on track 10)
- Teresa Berlink — female backing vocals (on track 3)

Miscellaneous staff

- Recorded in autumn 1985 in the Ônix project (8 channels), São Paulo, Brazil
- Fellini and Walter Silva — cover
- Luiz Carlos Calanca — phonographic production
- Fellini and Pappon — production, arrangement and mixing
- Luiz Carlos Calanca and Paulo Torres — remastering (cd version)
- Peter Price — mix-aid
