= Bivar =

Bivar is a surname. Notable people with the surname include:

- Antônio Bivar (1939–2020), Brazilian writer and playwright
- David Bivar (1926–2015), British numismatist and archaeologist
- Luciano Bivar (born 1944), Brazilian politician and businessman
