= Amanhã É Tarde =

Studio album by Fellini
- Released: March 4, 2002
- Recorded: March/August 2001
- Genre: Samba rock, bossa nova, MPB, alternative, indie
- Label: Midsummer Madness
- Producer: Rodrigo Lariú

Fellini chronology
Amor Louco (1990)	Amanhã É Tarde (2002)	Você Nem Imagina (2010)

Cadão Volpato chronology
Amor Louco (1990)	Amanhã É Tarde (2002)	Funziona Senza Vapore (2002)

Amanhã É Tarde (Portuguese for Tomorrow's Too Late) is the fifth studio album by Brazilian band Fellini. It was released on March 4, 2002, by independent carioca label Midsummer Madness. It is their first album of new material since 1990's Amor Louco. Although it is labeled as a Fellini album, it doesn't feature Jair Marcos and Ricardo Salvagni; as it happened in their 1986 album Fellini Só Vive 2 Vezes, it only features Cadão Volpato and Thomas Pappon.

The album's style is a mix between Fellini Só Vive 2 Vezes and Amor Louco: the instrumentation is minimalist, as in 2 Vezes, but light-hearted, varied and reminiscent of MPB, as in Amor Louco — the track "Besouro" even features a berimbau.

It is their last studio album, but not their last release; this would be the 2010 compilation Você Nem Imagina.

== Track listing ==
All lyrics are written by Cadão Volpato; all music is composed by Thomas Pappon.

No.	Title	English title	Length
1.	"Polichinelo"	Pulcinella	3:56
2.	"As Peles"	The Furs	5:44
3.	"Amanhã É Tarde"	Tomorrow's Too Late	3:26
4.	"Gravado no Rio"	Recorded at Rio	4:16
5.	"Greve"	Strike	4:18
6.	"Ventre Livre"	Free Womb	3:47
7.	"O Quarto"	The Room	6:24
8.	"Besouro"	Beetle	3:58
9.	"Retrato"	Portrait	4:29
10.	"Jardim Secreto"	Secret Garden	1:53
11.	"Contas"	Bills	4:38
12.	"Longe"	Faraway	2:51
13.	"Canção"	Song	5:04

== Personnel ==
Fellini

- Cadão Volpato — lead vocals (on all tracks, except 9), backing vocals (on track 9)
- Thomas Pappon — all instruments, backing vocals, lead vocals (on track 9)

Miscellaneous staff

- Recorded in 4 channels in Pellatt Road Studio, London, from March to August 2001.
- It contains samples of Jacks Wu, Esther & Abi Ofarim, The Ipanemas, Elizeth Cardoso and Ahmed Abdul-Malik, with all due respect and admiration
- Karla Pappon and Cadão Volpato — photography
- Renato Yada — cover
- Signore Volpato — drawing
- Marcos VRS — mastering
- Rodrigo Lariú — production
