= Mercenárias =

- Origin: São Paulo, Brazil
- Genres: Post-punk, alternative rock, punk rock, new wave
- Years active: 1982–1988; 2006–present
- Labels: Baratos Afins, EMI, Nada Nada Discos
- Members: Sandra Coutinho; Marianne Crestani; Michelle Abu
- Past members: Rosália Munhoz; Ana Machado; Leonardo Moreira; Edgard Scandurra; Geórgia Branco; Pitchu Ferraz; Sílvia Tape

Mercenárias (Portuguese for "Mercenaries"), sometimes erroneously referred to as As Mercenárias, are a Brazilian all-female rock band formed in São Paulo in 1982, by bassist Sandra Coutinho, vocalist Rosália Munhoz and guitarist Ana Machado. With lyrics that heavily criticized Brazilian government and society (and sometimes the Catholic Church as well), their sonority was constantly compared to Siouxsie and the Banshees, Joy Division, Sex Pistols and above all The Slits.

The band ended in 1988, but reunited in 2006 with a new line-up; further changes on the band's line-up would be made in early 2015 and then in 2017. The only original founding member remaining is Coutinho.

== History ==
Mercenárias was founded in São Paulo in 1982, by Sandra Coutinho, Rosália Munhoz and Ana Machado, at the time college students: Rosália studied Psychology at the PUC-SP, while Sandra and Ana were classmates at the ECA-USP, where they studied Journalism. A then-unknown Edgard Scandurra initially served as the band's drummer; however, he would leave the band in order to focus on the incipient Ira!, and was replaced by Lourdes "Lou" Moreira by the time the band released their first album. Sandra would also join Smack in 1983, alongside Scandurra, Sérgio "Pamps" Pamplona and Thomas Pappon, and gothic rock band Cabine C in 1984, alongside former Titãs member Ciro Pessoa. In 1983 they recorded a demo tape, containing eight tracks, but it was never made available to the general public.

The tape caught the attention of famous Brazilian independent label Baratos Afins though, which released Mercenárias' debut album, Cadê as Armas?, in 1986. It was extremely well-received, with the tracks "Inimigo", "Santa Igreja", "Polícia" and "Pânico" becoming underground hits. A music video was made for the latter track.

In 1988, the band released their second (and last) studio album, Trashland, via EMI. It received an even better reception than the first one, and won the prize of "Album of the Year" by magazine Bizz. However, EMI fired the band for unknown reasons, and they disbanded soon after. Ana and Rosália abandoned the musical career, while Sandra, in 1998, went on to live in Berlin for a while, where she formed the short-lived German-Brazilian group Akt, before returning to Brazil in 2005. "Lourdes" underwent a sex reassignment surgery and changed his name to Leonardo, and announced himself to be an LGBT activist.

In 2006, Sandra reformed the band and hired new members Geórgia Branco and Pitchu Ferraz.

In 2012, the band celebrated its 30-year anniversary, and performed at the CCJ Ruth Cardoso in São Paulo, for free. The show counted with the participation of Edgard Scandurra and Clemente Nascimento (of the band Inocentes), among others.

In November 2013, the band performed at the SESC Consolação, in a show celebrating the 35-year anniversary of Baratos Afins. Sandra's bandmates of Smack, Scandurra and Pamplona, participated in it.

In early 2015, Branco and Ferraz left the band and were replaced by Sílvia Tape and Michelle Abu. In mid-2017, Marianne Crestani replaced Tape.

In March 2015, Mercenárias announced on their official Facebook page that their 1983 demo would be remastered and finally available for purchase. The band's first release in 27 years, it came out on June 27, 2015 by independent label Nada Nada Discos.

On August 11, 2018, the band released the box set Baú 83–87, containing previously unreleased demos and rarities recorded between 1983 and 1987.

== Discography ==
=== Studio albums ===
Year	Album
1986	Cadê as Armas?: Label: Baratos Afins; Format: Vinyl
1988	Trashland: Label: EMI; Format: Vinyl

=== Compilations ===
Year	Album
2005	The Beginning of the End of the World: Label: Soul Jazz Records; Format: CD
2005	Não Wave: Label: Man Recordings; Format: CD; Contributed with the song "Polícia"
2005	The Sexual Life of the Savages: Label: Soul Jazz Records; Format: CD; Contributed with the songs "Inimigo" and "Pânico"
2015	Demo 1983: Label: Nada Nada Discos; Format: CD, digital download; Originally recorded in 1983
2018	Baú 83–87: Label: Nada Nada Discos; Format: Vinyl, digital download; Originally recorded between 1983 and 1987

=== Singles ===
- Pânico/Rock Europeu (split single with Fellini — 2005)

== Band members ==
=== Current members ===
- Sandra Coutinho – vocals (2006–), bass guitar (1982–1988, 2006–)
- Marianne Crestani – guitar, backing vocals (2017–)
- Michelle Abu – drums (2015–)

=== Former members ===
- Rosália Munhoz – vocals (1982–1988)
- Ana Machado – guitar (1982–1988)
- Edgard Scandurra – drums (1982–1985)
- Leonardo Moreira – drums (1985–1988)
- Geórgia Branco – guitar (2006–2015)
- Pitchu Ferraz – drums (2006–2015)
- Sílvia Tape – guitar (2015–2017)
