= Nau (album) =

Studio album by Nau
- Released: November 1986
- Recorded: 1986
- Genre: Post-punk, alternative rock
- Length: 36:17
- Label: CBS
- Producer: Luiz Carlos Maluly

Nau chronology
Nau (1986)	O Álbum Perdido do Nau (2018)

Vange Leonel chronology
Nau (1986)	Vange (1991)

Nau is the only studio album by Nau, a Brazilian post-punk band formed in 1985 by writer Vange Leonel (vocals), former Zero member Alberto "Beto" Birger (bass), Zique (guitar), and Mauro Sanches (drums, percussion). The album was released in 1986 through CBS Records International. Although it didn't achieve significant commercial success, "Nau" received critical acclaim and garnered attention from renowned singer Cazuza, who became a fan of the band.

According to former guitarist Zique, by 1989 Nau had begun working on their second album. Eight tracks were recorded for this album, but due to a lack of promotion and the declining appreciation of Brazilian rock during the late 1980s and early 1990s, the album was ultimately scrapped. As a result, the group disbanded shortly thereafter. Additionally, CBS, the label that released their first album, was dissolved the following year after being acquired by Sony. Four of the tracks intended for the unreleased second album were made available for streaming on Zique's now-defunct official website. Under the title O Álbum Perdido do Nau, it would only be released in its entirety on November 9, 2018, four years after the death of vocalist Vange Leonel.

"Nau" is the Portuguese word for carrack.

== Track listing ==
No.	Title	Lyrics	Length
1.	"Bom Sonho" (Good Dream)	Vange Leonel	2:10
2.	"Cálculos Astronômicos" (Astronomic Calculations)	Zique	3:16
3.	"Linha Esticada" (Stretched Line)	Cilmara Bedaque, Laura Finocchiaro	3:03
4.	"O que Eu Quero É Você" (What I Want Is You)	Zique	2:28
5.	"Balada" (Ballad)	Zique	4:14
6.	"Diva"	Beto Birger, Vange Leonel, Zique	2:55
7.	"Corpo Vadio" (Lazy Body)	Vange Leonel, Zique	4:08
8.	"Barcas" (Boats)	Beto Birger, Vange Leonel, Zique	3:08
9.	"As Ruas" (The Streets)	Vange Leonel, Zique	3:45
10.	"Novos Pesadelos" (New Nightmares)	Beto Birger, Mauro Sanches, Rosália Munhoz, Vange Leonel, Zique	3:47
11.	"Nada" (Nothing)	Beto Birger, Mauro Sanches, Vange Leonel, Zique	3:17

== Personnel ==
- Vange Leonel – vocals, rhythm guitar (tracks 1, 3, 6, 7, 8 and 9)
- Mauro Sanches – drums
- Zique – lead guitar
- Alberto "Beto" Birger – bass
- Luiz Carlos Maluly – production
- Roberto Marques – mixing
- Carlinhos Freitas, José Roberto Guarino, Roberto Marques – engineering
- Duda Oliveira, Rui Mendes – photography
