= Funziona Senza Vapore =

Studio album by Funziona Senza Vapore
- Released: 2002
- Recorded: 1992
- Genre: Alternative rock
- Label: Outros Discos

Cadão Volpato chronology
| Amanhã É Tarde (2002) | Funziona Senza Vapore (2002) | Tudo que Eu Quero Dizer Tem que Ser no Ouvido (2005) |

Funziona Senza Vapore is the only release by Funziona Senza Vapore, a very short-lived side project founded by former Fellini vocalist Cadão Volpato in 1992, two years after Fellini's first break-up. It was recorded in 1992, but wouldn't be released until 2002, by Brazilian independent label Outros Discos.

== Background ==
In 1984, Cadão Volpato formed the post-punk band Fellini alongside Jair Marcos, Ricardo Salvagni and Thomas Pappon. The band would come to an end in 1990, and shortly after, Pappon left Brazil and moved to Europe.

In 1992, Volpato decided to form a side project named Funziona Senza Vapore, named after Fellini's most famous song, present in their 1985 debut O Adeus de Fellini. It counted with the presence of both original members Jair Marcos and Ricardo Salvagni, but Stela Campos, famous for her work with indie rock band Lara Hanouska, replaced Thomas Pappon. They recorded an album, but being unable to find a record label willing to release it, for a long time it was abandoned, until in 1999 Volpato found the album's tapes amongst his belongings and managed to get it released by Outros Discos in 2002.

== Track listing ==
All lyrics are written by Cadão Volpato; all music is composed by Cadão Volpato (except where noted)

| No. | Title | English title | Length |
|---|---|---|---|
| 1. | "Shakespeare" | | 3:56 |
| 2. | "Camaradas" | Comrades | 3:40 |
| 3. | "Se Você For Onde Você For" | If You Go to Where You Go | 3:46 |
| 4. | "Veneza" | Venice | 2:46 |
| 5. | "Passagem Meteórica" | Meteoric Passage | 3:36 |
| 6. | "Valsa do Père Lachaise" (Salvagni, Volpato) | Père Lachaise Waltz | 2:51 |
| 7. | "Depois, o Amor" | Afterwards, Love | 3:25 |
| 8. | "Zero de Comportamento" | Zero in Behavior | 4:25 |
| 9. | "Criança de Domingo" (Salvagni, Volpato) | Sunday Child | 4:48 |
| 10. | "Lava" | | 2:29 |
| 11. | "Flor da Espera" | Waiting Flower | 3:06 |

== Reception ==
Professional ratings
Review scores
| Source | Rating |
|---|---|
| Cliquemusic | link |
| ZERO | link |

Funziona Senza Vapore was positively received upon its release: writing for UOL Cliquemusic, Marco Antônio Barbosa rated it with 3 out of 5 stars, calling it a "curious" work and praising Cadão Volpato's and Stela Campos' vocals, his "surreal and deliriously romantic" lyrics and its "idiosyncratic melodies".

Magazine ZERO rated it with a 7 out of 10, saying that even though the album is "hard to listen for those who are not accustomed to Volpato's former project Fellini", its "lo-fi samba and poetic lyrics" are some of its strong points. They particularly praised the songs "Shakespeare", "Veneza" and "Zero de Comportamento".

Chico Science, former vocalist and founding member of Mangue Bit band Nação Zumbi, was a huge fan of both Fellini and Cadão Volpato; he made a cover of "Criança de Domingo", which is present as a bonus track on the CD re-release of Nação Zumbi's 1996 album Afrociberdelia. "Se Você For Onde Você For" and "Passagem Meteórica" would appear on Stela Campos' debut solo album, Céu de Brigadeiro, released in 1999.

== Personnel ==
Funziona Senza Vapore

- Cadão Volpato — acoustic guitar, vocals
- Jair Marcos — guitar, vocals
- Ricardo Salvagni — bass, programming
- Stela Campos — keyboard, vocals

Miscellaneous staff

- Funziona Senza Vapore and Tancred Pappon — mixing
- Carlos Freitas — mastering
- Mila Waldeck — graphic design
- Jean Vigo — cover (images)
