= Não São Paulo, Vol. 1 =

Compilation album by Various artists
- Released: 1986
- Recorded: 1980s
- Genre: Post-punk, garage rock, gothic rock, synthpop
- Label: Baratos Afins
- Producer: Luiz Calanca

Não São Paulo, Vol. 1 is a compilation album released by famous Brazilian independent label Baratos Afins in 1986, containing a selection of songs by the most famous underground Brazilian post-punk bands active during the mid-1980s. The album's name is a reference to the Brian Eno-produced compilation No New York, released in 1978.

The compilation was re-issued under CD format in 1996, with four additional bonus live tracks recorded in 1988.

The second and last installment of the Não São Paulo series, Não São Paulo, Vol. 2, would be released in the following year.

== Track listing ==
No.	Title	Artist	Length
1.	"Sobre as Pernas"	Akira S. e as Garotas que Erraram	4:37
2.	"Jovens Ateus"	Muzak	3:19
3.	"Samba do Morro"	Chance	4:31
4.	"Adeus, Buck Rogers"	Ness	2:37
5.	"Ilha Urbana"	Muzak	3:20
6.	"M.R.O."	Ness	3:44
7.	"Swing Basses Series I (Eu Dirijo o Carro-Bomba)"	Akira S. e as Garotas que Erraram	1:44
8.	"O Striptease de Mme. X"	Chance	6:01

1996 CD re-release bonus tracks
No.	Title	Artist	Length
9.	"Beautiful but True" (live)	Chance	4:02
10.	"Vie Moderne" (live)	Ness	4:46
11.	"TV Morte" (live; instrumental)	Muzak	2:39
12.	"Kkbalah" (live)	Akira S. e as Garotas que Erraram	4:43

== See also ==
- The Sexual Life of the Savages
- Não Wave
- Não São Paulo, Vol. 2
- No New York
- Sim São Paulo
