= Não São Paulo, Vol. 2 =

Compilation album by Various artists
- Released: 1987
- Recorded: 1980s
- Genre: Post-punk, punk rock, alternative rock
- Label: Baratos Afins
- Producer: Luiz Calanca

Não São Paulo, Vol. 2 is a compilation album released by famous Brazilian independent label Baratos Afins in 1987, one year after the previous installment, Não São Paulo, Vol. 1. Unlike the previous compilation, that featured relatively well-known Brazilian post-punk bands active during the mid-1980s, Vol. 2 brings out more obscure bands (with the exception of Nau, fronted by Brazilian LGBT activist Vange Leonel, and 365, a slightly popular punk rock band from São Paulo).

The album was re-issued under CD form in 1996, featuring four additional bonus tracks.

The lyrics to "Sofro", by Nau, were taken from a poem written by Portuguese poet Fernando Pessoa (under the pen name Ricardo Reis). "Grândola, Vila Morena" is a cover of Zeca Afonso's eponymous song.

== Track listing ==
No.	Title	Artist	Length
1.	"Madame Oráculo"	Nau	2:54
2.	"Fotografia"	Gueto	2:40
3.	"31 de Março"	365	3:26
4.	"O Analista"	Vultos	1:46
5.	"Luta"	Gueto	2:50
6.	"Farsantes Amantes"	Vultos	2:41
7.	"Sofro"	Nau	3:12
8.	"Grândola, Vila Morena"	365	2:59

1996 CD re-release bonus tracks
No.	Title	Artist	Length
9.	"Madame Oráculo" (live in São Paulo, 5 February 1988)	Nau	3:40
10.	"Farsantes Amantes" (live in São Paulo, 5 February 1988)	Vultos	2:50
11.	"Luta" (live in São Paulo, 5 February 1988)	Gueto	2:51
12.	"Grândola, Vila Morena" (demo version)	365	3:38

== See also ==
- The Sexual Life of the Savages
- Não Wave
- Não São Paulo, Vol. 1
- No New York
