= Guitar Days =

Film directed by Caio Augusto Braga

Guitar Days - An Unlikely Story of Brazilian Music
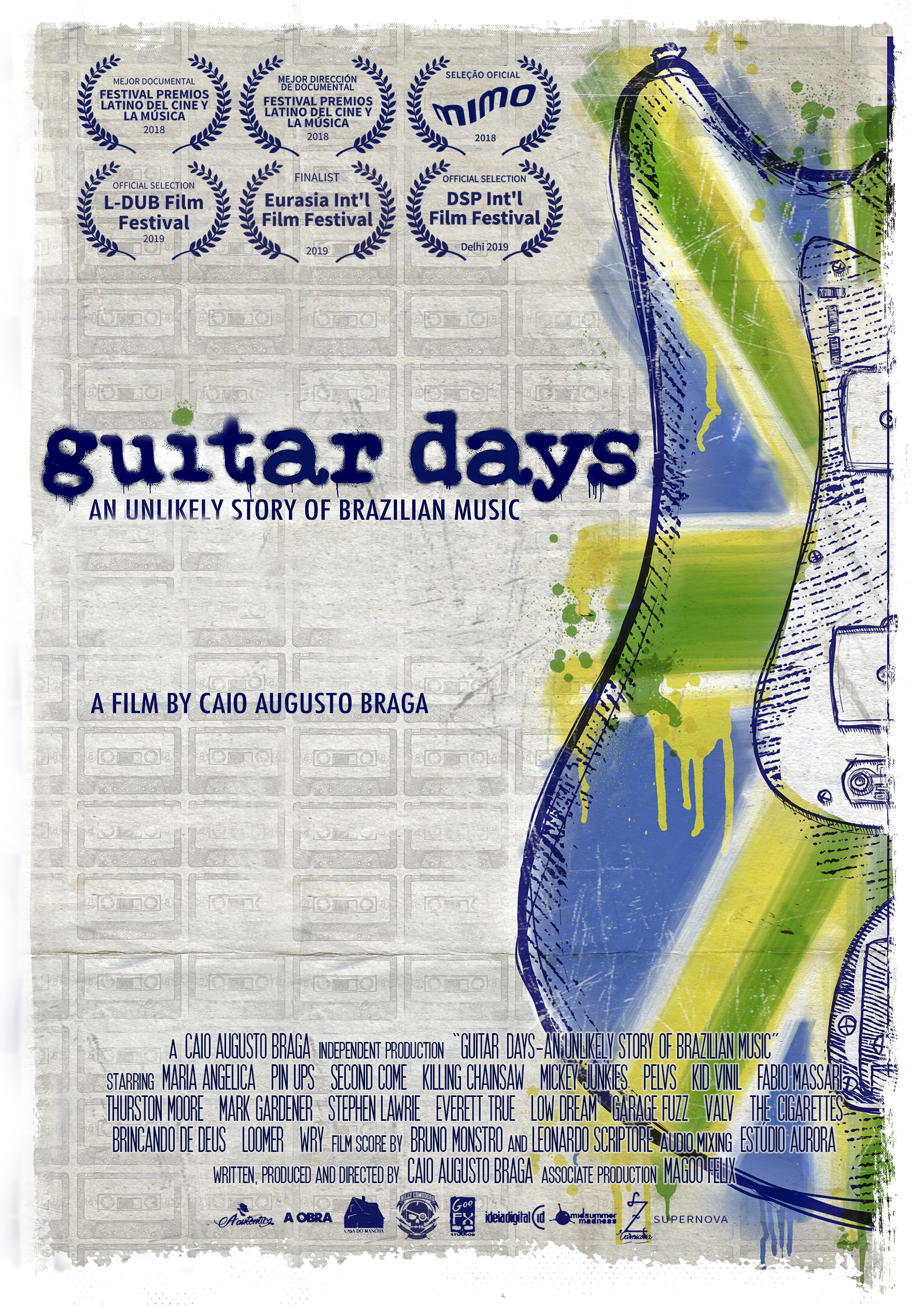
- Directed by: Caio Augusto Braga
- Written by: Caio Augusto Braga
- Starring: Maria Angélica, Pin Ups, Second Come, Killing Chainsaw, Mickey Junkies, Garage Fuzz, PELVs, The Cigarettes, Fabio Massari, Kid Vinil, Thurston Moore, Mark Gardener, Stephen Lawrie, Marcel Plasse, Everett True, Alexandre Matias, Alex Antunes
- Music by: Leonardo Scriptore Bruno Monstro
- Release date: July 2019 (In-Edit Festival)
- Running time: 86 minutes
- Country: Brazil
- Languages: Portuguese; English

Guitar Days - An Unlikely Story of Brazilian Music is a Brazilian documentary film directed by Caio Augusto Braga.

Released in 2019 at Festival In-Edit Brasil, the film depicts the story of Brazilian indie rock predecessors, the guitar bands, and the current alternative rock scenario in the country.

== Synopsis ==
A new generation of rock bands decides to defy the status quo and immerse in a new not-so-Brazilian genre, permanently transforming the national music scenario with their noisy guitars, lyrics in English and vigorous performances. Singing in English was not an option anymore, even if that meant being disowned by the mainstream media for good.

They are the guitar bands.

== Production ==
The documentary was produced without sponsorships or public grants. In order to raise funds to finance the film production, the director came up with concerts in São Paulo, Rio de Janeiro and Belo Horizonte, part of a crowdfunding programme. Although the financing did not reach the expected amount of money, the concerts were maintained and the audience was able to see, after 18 years, the return of Killing Chainsaw, apart from the concerts of Second Come, Mickey Junkies, The Cigarettes, Valv, among others.

Right after the crowdfunding's concerts, the director Caio Augusto Braga flies to England to interview artists that influenced the guitar movement in Brazil, such as Thurston Moore (Sonic Youth), Mark Gardener (Ride), Stephen Lawrie (The Telescopes), and also the British journalist, discoverer of grunge, Everett True.

In 2018, Pin Ups records its first song in years for the film music compilation released in 2019 by the Brazilian label Midsummer Madness Records.

== Music ==
In September 2019, the label Midsummer Madness Records released an album, compilation of various artists, in CD and digital platform, of bands related to the guitar movement.

The line-up was chosen by the director Caio Augusto Braga, and brings the following bands/songs:

- Loomer - Lack;
- Adriano Cintra - The Big Deserter;
- Twinpine(s) - Waning;
- The Cigarettes - Never Know Why;
- Pin Ups - First Time;
- The Concept - Sad Walk;
- Justine Never Knew The Rules - Polar Bear (Hibernation Song);
- Câmera - Soirée Chez Moi;
- Valv - New Ground;
- The John Candy - Scrappy Christmas;
- Wry - Life is Like a Dream;
- PELVs - Take Mine;
- The Biggs - Breech Delivery;
- Mudhill - Sand of Sorrow;
- Lava Divers - Hash & Weed;
- Mickey Junkies - Big Bad Wolves;
- Second Come - Infatuated Love;
- Hateen - Ocean of Rain;
- MQN - I Can't Get Higher;
- Maria Angélica Não Mora Mais Aqui - Alemanha.

=== Digital ===
- Fish Magic - Hymn;
- Old Magic Pallas - Enchanted;
- Shed - Luxury;
- Loyal Gun - Better Than Before;
- Garage Fuzz - Daylight;
- Travelling Wave - Drivin' Searching;
- Winter Waves - Red Birds.
