= Garotos Podres =

Brazilian punk rock band

- Origin: Mauá, São Paulo, Brazil
- Genres: Street punk Oi! Punk rock
- Years active: 1982–2013
- Labels: Rocker, Lup Som, Radical Records, Paradoxx Music, Garotos Podres Records, Ataque Frontal, Fast 'n' Loud, Rotten Records
- Past members: Mao; Cacá Saffiotti; Sukata "Capitão Caverna" Nunes; Mauro; Godô; Maurício; Português

Garotos Podres (Portuguese for Rotten Boys) is a Brazilian punk rock band formed in 1982 in the city of Mauá in the metropolitan region of São Paulo called A.B.C..

In 1985, while Brazil was still under military dictatorship, they appeared on the Ataque Sonoro compilation along with Ratos de Porão, Cólera, Lobotomia and others of the Brazilian hardcore. They released the first album of the band, Mais Podres do que Nunca ("More Rotten Than Ever"), on the now defunct Rocker label and then the band really started, selling about 50,000 copies and becoming popular until today. In July 2016, the album was elected by Rolling Stone Brasil as the 3rd best Brazilian punk rock album.

Due to censorship at the time, the song Johnny was censored, while others such as Papai Noel Filho da Puta (Santa Claus Son of a Bitch) and Maldita Policia (Damn Police) were relaunched as Papai-Noel Velho Batuta (Santa Claus Cool Old Man, where "velho batuta" sounds very close to "filho da puta", "son of a bitch" on a free translation) and Maldita Preguiça (Damned Laziness) respectively.

Mao, vocalist of the band, is also a history professor on the University of São Paulo with a Doctorate in History.

In 2013, Mao and the rest of the band parted ways. Since Mao had never registered the band's name, the remaining musicians did so and continued touring under the moniker "Garotos", performing the old Garotos Podres catalog. Mao founded a new project named "O Satânico Dr. Mao e os Espiões Secretos" and recorded an album entitled O Satânico Dr. Mao e os Espiões Secretos Contra os Coxinhas Renegados Inimigos do Povo. A few years later, in 2016, the Brazilian courts ruled in Mao's favor, granting him the exclusive legal rights to the name "Garotos Podres" as the band's founder and primary songwriter, forcing his former bandmates to stop using it. Once Mao reclaimed the trademark, the 2014 album was officially integrated into the band's discography on streaming platforms under the name Garotos Podres, while preserving its original, extensive title.

== Discography ==
=== Studio albums ===
- Mais Podres do que Nunca (1985)
- Pior que Antes (1988)
- Canções para Ninar (1993)
- Com a Corda Toda (1997)
- Garotozil de Podrezepam (2003)
- Contra os Coxinhas Renegados Inimigos do Povo (2014)

=== Live albums ===
- Rock de Subúrbio - Live! (1995)
- Garotos Podres - Live in Rio (2001)

=== Compilation ===
- Arriba! Arriba! (1997)

==== Compilation appearances ====
- Ataque Sonoro (LP, 1985, Ataque Frontal)
- Vozes da Raiva Vol.1 (CD, 1994, Fast'n'loud)
- Um Chute na Oreia! (CD, 1995, Fast'n'loud)
- Urbanoise (CD, 1996, Rotten Records)
- Play it Loud (CD, 1996, Fast'n'loud)
- Arriba! Arriba! (CD, 1997, Fast'n'loud)
- Caught in the Cyclone (CD, 1997, Cyclone Records)
- Punk Rock Makes the World Go Round (CD, 1997, Teenage Rebels Records)
- Cult 22 (CD, 1997, RVC Music)
- Rock da Cidade (CD, 1998, Paradoxx Music)
- Sexta Rock (CD, 1998, Paradoxx Music)
- Oi! Um Grito de União Vol.3 (CD, 2000, Rotten Records)
- Garotos Podres & Albert Fish Split (CD, 2006)

== Band members ==
Including old members

- KK - guitar
- Sukata - bass guitar
- "Capitão Caverna" Nunes - drums
- Mauro - guitar
- Godô - bass guitar
- Maurício - drums
- Português - drums
- Mao - vocals, harmonica
