= Nasi (singer) =

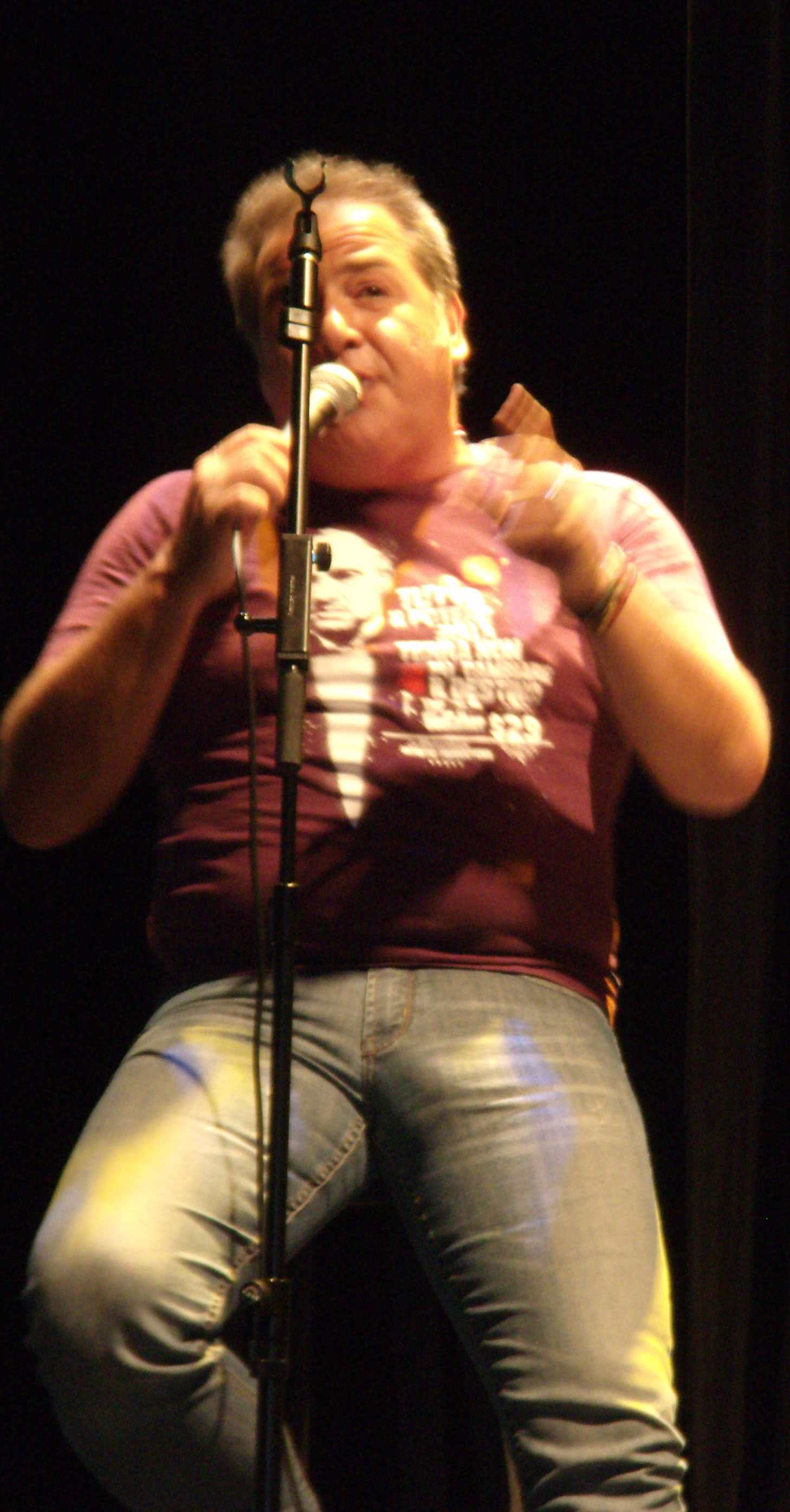
- Nasi in 2012

Background information
- Born: Marcos Valadão Rodolfo; January 23, 1962 (age 64); São Paulo, Brazil
- Genres: Rock, post-punk, blues rock, alternative rock
- Occupations: Singer-songwriter, bassist, actor, record producer, radio host, tv presenter
- Instruments: Vocals, bass guitar
- Years active: 1981–present
- Labels: Arsenal Music, RDS, Tinitus, Baratos Afins, Abril Music, Paradoxx, WEA, Coqueiro Verde

Marcos Valadão Ridolfi (formerly Rodolfo, born January 23, 1962), better known by the stage name Nasi, is a Brazilian singer-songwriter, bassist, actor, record producer, radio host, TV presenter former disc jockey, and vocalist for the Brazilian rock bands Ira! and Voluntários da Pátria. He is also a football commentator for RedeTV! since 2008. He is a São Paulo FC fan.

== Discography ==
=== Solo ===
- Onde Os Anjos Não Ousam Pisar (2006)
- Vivo na Cena – Ao Vivo no Estúdio (2010)

=== Ira! ===
- Mudança de Comportamento (1985)
- Vivendo e Não Aprendendo (1986)
- Psicoacústica (1988)
- Clandestino (1990)
- Meninos da Rua Paulo (1991)
- Música Calma para Pessoas Nervosas (1993)
- 7 (1996)
- Você Não Sabe Quem Eu Sou (1998)
- Isso é Amor (1999)
- MTV ao Vivo (2000)
- Entre seus Rins (2001)
- Acústico MTV (2004)
- Invisível DJ (2007)

=== Voluntários da Pátria ===
- Voluntários da Pátria (1984)

=== Nasi and Os Irmãos do Blues ===
- Uma Noite Com Nasi & Os Irmãos do Blues (1993)
- Os Brutos Também Amam (1996)
- O Rei da Cocada Preta (2000)
- Nasi & Os Irmãos do Blues Ao Vivo (Official Bootleg) (2000)
