= Maria Angélica Doesn't Live Here Anymore =

Brazilian rock band

- Origin: São Paulo, São Paulo, Brazil
- Genres: Indie rock
- Years active: 1984–1991
- Labels: Vinil Urbano; Polythene Pam
- Past members: Fernando Naporano; Carlos Nishimiya; Victor Bock; Vitor Leite; Lu Stoppa; Kim Kehl; Deborah Freire; Felipe Tillier; Nelson Fumagalli; Décio Medeiros; Kuki Stolarski; Guilherme Coelho Mola Nardis Lemme

Maria Angélica Doesn't Live Here Anymore (Maria Angélica Não Mora Mais Aqui, in Portuguese) was a Brazilian, São Paulo-based indie rock band, formed in mid-1984 by Fernando Naporano (lyrics/lead vocals), guitarist Carlos Nishimiya and guitarist Victor Bock.

== Career ==
In the beginning Maria Angélica had many different influences. The songs were written in Portuguese, influenced by the '60s garage rock, power punk and rock and roll, and MPB from the '70s as well. When the new members arrived in 1987 - Vitor Leite (drums) and Lu Stoppa (bass), the band's approach changed quite a lot. The songs became heavier and started being written in English, when the lead singer Fernando Naporano became the first Brazilian rocker from his movement to use the English language in his compositions.

The new songs were heavily driven by new guitar sounds from its time, moving from jingle-jangly to folk-pop, being heavily influenced by the C86 movement. This new atmosphere created by the group made Fernando Naporano call themselves a Regressive Rock band. Then the first LP came out: "Outsider" (Vinil Urbano) was released in 1988. Recorded live in the studio in just two six-hours sessions, the mix was very raw, with practically no producers other than the band themselves and a friend, Rolando Castello Júnior, a famous Brazilian percussionist. The LP included the one and only song the band ever covered in their own records, which is "I Don't Mind" by the British punk band Buzzcocks.

In 1989 they recorded another cover, but this time for a tribute album to the Brazilian composter Arnaldo Antunes (Os Mutantes).

The band had more than seven different formations in its history, but the main musicians (Naporano/Bock/Nishimiya) kept together until 1989. Naporano decided that the band would record another album then move to London, which made Stopa and Nishimiya leave the band. The group was then joined by Deborah Freire (bass) and Kim Kehl (guitar) and the band officially decided to change their name from Maria Angélica Não Mora Mais Aqui to Maria Angélica Doesn't Live Here Anymore, just a renaming following a Portuguese-English translation.

The result of the new members' work was registered in a mini-LP called “Full Moon Depression” (1990, Polythene Pam) and in a posthumous album called “Stroboscopic Cherries” (1991, Polythene Pam). Both of them were recorded in a studio in São Paulo, coproduced by the American audio engineer Roy Cicalla, who was living in Brazil by the time.

The group remained active until 1991, even though Bock, Freire and Naporano were together in London. In the subsequent years the band only survived by admirers living in the underground Brazilian alternative rock scene, but was rediscovered and praised in the 2018 documentary film "Guitar Days" (directed by Caio Augusto Braga), which discussed the originality of the group, showing them as predecessors and forerunners of the Brazilian indie rock movement that has started in the '90s.

In 2021, the band's catalogue started becoming available in music streaming services worldwide.

== Discography ==
=== Albums ===
- 1988 Outsider
- 1991 Stroboscopic Cherries

=== Mini-LPs ===
- 1991 Full Moon Depression

=== EPs ===
- 1986 Lost & Found

=== Bootlegs ===
- 2000 Saudade dos Amores que Não Tive

=== Appears on ===
- 1989 Sanguinho novo... Arnaldo Baptista Revisitado
- 2019 Guitar Days - An Unlikely Story of Brazilian Music
