= Fellini Só Vive 2 Vezes =

Studio album by Fellini
- Released: 1986 (re-released in 1995)
- Recorded: 1986
- Genre: Post-punk
- Label: Baratos Afins
- Producer: Luiz Calanca

Fellini chronology
O Adeus de Fellini (1985)	Fellini Só Vive 2 Vezes (1986)	3 Lugares Diferentes (1987)

Cadão Volpato chronology
O Adeus de Fellini (1985)	Fellini Só Vive 2 Vezes (1986)	3 Lugares Diferentes (1987)

Fellini Só Vive 2 Vezes (Portuguese for Fellini Only Lives Twice) is the second studio album by Brazilian post-punk band Fellini. It was released in 1986 by Baratos Afins and re-released in CD form in 1995.

Guitarist Jair Marcos and drummer Ricardo Salvagni could not play for this album for personal reasons, thus only vocalist Cadão Volpato and bassist/multi-instrumentalist Thomas Pappon took part on the album's recording, that happened in a small studio in Pappon's house.

The album's front cover was illustrated by Cadão Volpato.

A music video was made for the track "Burros e Oceanos"; however, it was never broadcast and is now lost.

== Track listing ==
All lyrics are written by Cadão Volpato (except where noted); all music is composed by Thomas Pappon.

No.	Title	English title	Length
1.	"Alcatraz Song"		2:06
2.	"Mãe dos Gatos"	The Mother of the Cats	5:30
3.	"Todos os Dias da Semana"	All the Weekdays	2:12
4.	"Domingo de Páscoa"	Easter Sunday	2:06
5.	"Alguma Coisa Vai Dar"	Something Will Happen	3:15
6.	"Burros e Oceanos"	Donkeys and Oceans	3:17
7.	"Socorro"	Help	2:43
8.	"Tabu"	Taboo	2:30
9.	"Tudo Sobre Você" (Thomas Pappon)	Everything About You	3:43
10.	"O Padre Hippie" (instrumental)	The Hippie Priest	1:48
11.	"O Padre Hippie Voltou" (instrumental)	The Hippie Priest Is Back	1:47

== Personnel ==
Fellini

- Cadão Volpato — lead vocals
- Thomas Pappon — all instruments, backing vocals

Miscellaneous staff

- Recorded a 4-channel studio door on January 86 and mixed in March at Vice Versa Studio, São Paulo sound engineer Nico Bloise
- Tamara Keller — photography
- Pappon, Volpato and Walter Silva — cover (final art)
- Signore Volpato — drawing
- Luiz Carlos Calanca, Thomas Pappon and Cadão Volpato — production
- Luiz Carlos Calanca and Paulo Torres — remastering (cd version)
- Thank you Tancred
- This album is dedicated a Ricardo Salvagni, Jayr Marcos and Bia Abramo
- One production Baratos Afins
