= Vange Leonel =

Brazilian singer-songwriter, playwright and novelist (1963–2014)

- Born: Maria Evangelina Leonel Gandolfo; 4 May 1963; São Paulo, São Paulo, Brazil
- Died: 14 July 2014 (aged 51); São Paulo, São Paulo, Brazil
- Resting place: Cemitério Horto da Paz, Itapecerica da Serra, São Paulo, Brazil
- Occupations: Singer-songwriter, journalist, novelist, playwright, cronista
- Years active: 1985–2014
- Partner: Cilmara Bedaque (1995–2014)
- Musical career
- Genres: Post-punk, alternative rock
- Instruments: Vocals, rhythm guitar
- Labels: CBS Records International, Sony Music Entertainment, Medusa Records

Maria Evangelina Leonel Gandolfo (4 May 1963 – 14 July 2014), known as Vange Leonel, was a Brazilian singer-songwriter, rhythm guitarist, journalist, blogger, cronista, novelist, playwright, beer sommelier, and feminist and LGBT rights activist. Known for her distinctive soulful, bluesy vocals heavily inspired by Billie Holiday and Janis Joplin, she was famous for her work with post-punk band Nau, active from 1985 to 1989, before beginning a solo career in 1991.

== Biography ==
Vange Leonel was born in São Paulo in 1963; great-granddaughter of General Ataliba Leonel, who fought in the 1932 Constitutionalist Revolution, and cousin of former Titãs member Nando Reis, her first musical ventures were with the post-punk band Nau (Portuguese for "carrack"), which was founded in 1985. Nau released an eponymous album by CBS in 1987, and also took part in the compilation Não São Paulo, Vol. 2, released by Baratos Afins; however, it would disband in 1989, after plans for a second studio album fell through, and Vange followed with a solo career.

Her first solo album, Vange, was released in 1991 by Sony Music Entertainment, and spawned her most well-known song, "Noite Preta", which was used as the opening theme of the popular Brazilian telenovela Vamp. Another song off the album, "Esse Mundo", would be used as the opening theme for another telenovela, Perigosas Peruas.

Her second solo release, the EP Vermelho, came out in 1996 by the independent label Medusa Records, founded by Vange and her domestic partner, journalist Cilmara Bedaque, in the same year. Bedaque also co-authored numerous of Vange's songs since the times of Nau. Vermelho was not as well-regarded as her previous album though, and Vange abandoned the musical career to devote herself to literature.

Vange came out as a lesbian in 1995, and became an advocate for the gay cause and women's rights. In 1999 she published her first book, Lésbicas, that was followed by Grrrls: Garotas Iradas in 2001; both were compilations of articles she wrote for now-defunct LGBT magazine Sui Generis from 1997 to 2000. She also wrote for the Revista da Folha, CartaCapital and Mix Brasil, and alongside Cilmara Bedaque she also had a beer-related blog named "Lupulinas".

In 2000, she wrote her first theatre play, As Sereias da Rive Gauche, that was performed in the same year under Regina Galdino's direction and published as a book in 2002. Her first and only novel, Balada para as Meninas Perdidas, was released in 2003.

Her fifth and last literary work was the play Joana Evangelista, which came out in 2006; a modern-day reimagining of Joan of Arc's life, it deals with the theme of abortion.

In a 2012 interview, Vange stated that she was working on a translation to Portuguese of Djuna Barnes' 1928 novel Ladies Almanack. Since then, however, no further announcements regarding the translation were given, and it is unknown if she got to finish it prior to her death.

== Death and legacy ==
In mid-June 2014, Vange was diagnosed with ovarian cancer, and was admitted to the Santa Isabel Hospital in São Paulo for treatment. The cancer eventually metastasized to her gastric mucosa, evolving to a terminal stage; thus, whatever treatment proved to be unsuccessful, and Vange died, aged 51, on 14 July 2014. She was cremated and her ashes were buried the next day at the Horto da Paz Cemetery, in Itapecerica da Serra.

On 6 November 2014 she was posthumously awarded the Order of Cultural Merit.

== Personal life ==
Vange began a relationship with Cilmara Bedaque in 1986, and the couple registered their domestic partnership in 1995. It lasted until Vange's death in 2014.

== Discography ==
=== With Nau ===
Year	Album
1987	Não São Paulo, Vol. 2 (compilation): Label: Baratos Afins; Format: Vinyl, CD; Contributed with the songs "Madame Oráculo" and "Sofro"
1987	Nau: Label: CBS; Format: Vinyl
2005	The Sexual Life of the Savages (compilation): Label: Soul Jazz Records; Format: CD; Contributed with the song "Madame Oráculo"
2018	O Álbum Perdido do Nau (compilation; posthumous): Label: Deckdisc; Format: Digital download

=== Solo ===
Year	Album
1991	Vange: Label: Sony; Format: Vinyl, CD
1996	Vermelho (EP): Label: Medusa Records; Format: CD

=== As a session member ===
Mercenárias

- 1986: Cadê as Armas? (additional vocals in "Santa Igreja")

== Bibliography ==
- Lésbicas (1999)
- Grrrls: Garotas Iradas (2001)
- As Sereias da Rive Gauche (2002)
- Balada para as Meninas Perdidas (2003)
- Joana Evangelista (2006)
