= Pequeno Cidadão (album) =

Studio album by Pequeno Cidadão
- Released: 2009
- Recorded: 2008–2009
- Genre: Pop rock Children's music
- Length: 42:18
- Language: Portuguese
- Label: Rosa Celeste

Pequeno Cidadão chronology
Pequeno Cidadão (2009)	Pequeno Cidadão 2 (2012)

Pequeno Cidadão is the debut album by the children's pop rock band Pequeno Cidadão, released on physical media in 2009 by the record label Rosa Celeste and re-released on streaming platforms in 2016 by MCD.

The album received excellent reviews from the media and critics, and was also recommended for listening with children by MVC Editora and the "Paternidade" column of Editora Globo.

== Overview ==
Pequeno Cidadão has 14 tracks and lyrics that play with the first "existential dilemmas" of human beings, with a repertoire focused on the daily lives of those who have children. The songs are about love, giving up pacifiers, soccer, animals, rock to psychedelia, and a delightful mix of fun and emotion, very much in line with the daily lives of those who live with children.

Before the album's release, the songs were already a hit on the group's Myspace page, which also features behind-the-scenes footage from the recordings. The album was also released on DVD, featuring a music video for each of the 14 tracks.

Several songs from the album were licensed for use as themes in children's soap operas on SBT: "Pequeno Cidadão" and "O Sol e a Lua" in Carrossel, "Sapo-Boi" in Patrulha Salvadora, "Meu Anjinho" in Chiquititas and "Oi, Hello" in As Aventuras de Poliana.

== Tracks ==
All tracks composed by Arnaldo Antunes, Antônio Pinto, Edgar Scandurra, and Tatiana Barros.

No.	Title	Length
1.	"Pequeno Cidadão"	3:38
2.	"O Sol e a Lua"	3:49
3.	"Meu Anjinho"	3:50
4.	"Futezinho na Escola"	3:53
5.	"O "X""	2:35
6.	"Tchau Chupeta"	3:27
7.	"Sapo-Boi"	2:34
8.	"Leitinho"	2:39
9.	"Larga a Lagartixa"	2:03
10.	"O Uirapuru"	2:45
11.	"Sobe Desce"	1:38
12.	"Bonequinha do Papai"	4:23
13.	"Carrinho por Trás"	2:56
14.	"Pererê"	2:08
Total length:		42:18
