= Lobotomia =

Brazilian crossover thrash band

- Origin: São Paulo, Brazil
- Genres: Crossover thrash, hardcore punk, thrash metal
- Years active: 1984–1989, 2002, 2018, 2024
- Label: Cogumelo
- Members: Grego; Daniel Brita; Renato; Gabriel Kaspar
- Past members: Markon; Guba; Spock; Caio; Adherbal; Alfredo; Paulo; Zézé; Flavinho; José Eduardo; Rafael Pica-Pau; Pedro; Carlinhos; André; Fralda; Eduardo Vudoo; Guilherme Gotto
- Website: Lobotomia on Facebook

Lobotomia is a Brazilian crossover thrash band from São Paulo.

== History ==
Lobotomia was founded in 1984, characterized by hardcore and crossover thrash songs. Its original formation was Caio on vocals, Adherbal Billy Argel on guitars, Grego on drums, and Alfredo on bass.

The punk movement was on the rise and places like Napalm, Carbono 14, Lira Paulistana, Madame Satã, Ácido Plástico and others were welcoming bands of this kind.

At the end of 1985, Lobotomia was part of the Ataque Sonoro compilation by the independent label Ataque Frontal and the change to the band's musical style was already visible on this album, in search for a new sonority and the starting fusion with other heavy sound styles. Along with the bands Cólera, Garotos Podres, Ratos de Porão, Armagedom, Vírus 27, Grinders, Desordeiros, and Auschwitz.

In 1986, with Caio as the vocalist, Adherbal being the guitarist, Grego playing the drums and Zezé being their bassist, they got ready to record what was going to be the first Brazilian "metal punk" record, the style that later would lead to what is known today as crossover.

The vinyl LP – Lobotomia – was recorded and produced by the band while New Face Records collaborated with pressing and distribution in 1987. This album has a characteristic metallic, dark and innovative sound that was different from everything that was heard in terms of punk in Brazil until then. This work includes the re-recording of Faces da Morte and also the band's classics like Só Os Mortos Não Reclamam and Indigentes do Amanhã, with lyrics by Adherbal and Caio.

This record was remarkable because even though it was a heavy and completely out of the 80's market standards One of its songs, "Só Os Mortos Não Reclamam", was on the regular schedule of the 89 FM radio station, which was entitled Radio Rock. At the time, it was inconceivable to play this musical genre on the radio, especially if the station had a more alternative profile.

In this phase, Lobotomia went through another change. For the live concerts, they called Paulo, who was friends with the vocalist Caio, to play a second guitar. With this formation they played many concerts in the São Paulo underground.

In 1988, Zezé and Caio quit the band and gave room to Flavinho on bass and Guba on vocals. Most of the next album songs were written at this phase, with three of the lyrics being written by Guba. When Guba left, Markon took up the vocals, and with this formation they entered a studio in Belo Horizonte and recorded in 1989, by the label Cogumelo Discos, the LP Nada É Como Parece. The band's sound got more cohesive by mixing styles, sounding closer to heavy metal bands but still not being regarded as crossover. By the end of the recordings the band came full circle and temporarily ceased their activities after a few more concerts.

In 2002, the band (Markon, Adherbal, Paulo, Grego and Picapau) reunited for a concert with Agnostic Front.

In 2003, the first album's CD "Lobotomia" is relaunched in Japan by the record company SpeedStates.

In 2004, the band returns to action but now with only one member of the original formation: the drummer Grego. The guitarist is Jozé (ex- Kangaroos In Tilt), bassist Fralda (ex-Ratos de Porão) and Markon on vocals. Many concerts were made around the country in Brazil with this formation. With the departure of Zé, the band returns to the Nada É Como Parece formation, with the exception of Flavinho, who was substituted by Fralda, who later would be replaced by Carlos "Carlinhos". In January 2008 Grego, Adherbal, Paulo, Markon and Carlos entered the studio to record one more album called Extinção, with 13 songs that combine several styles shifting between hardcore, punk and thrash metal.

After the recording, Adherbal and Paulo quit the band again and Carlos changes focus to his band "Presto?".

In 2009, Fralda returns to the band, André (Presto?) assumes the guitars and the band played a few more concerts to spread the new album Extinção. In July 2009, with the formation Grego, Markon, Fralda and André, Lobotomia finally leave the country for their first European tour.

In 2011, the band embarked on a second European tour. This was longer than the one prior which led to Lobotomia visiting more countries due to their rising acknowledgement and influence in the music industry.

Right after the second tour Markon leaves the band along with the guitarist Spock. Guilherme Goto joins the band at only 15 years old and assumes the guitars. Edu Voodoo joins as the new vocalist. In 2013 Fralda also leaves the band and is substituted by Gabriel Kaspar, that in 2015 is replaced by Daniel Brita (Pig Soul and Mão Santa).

With this formation of Edu Voodoo, Guilherme Goto, Daniel Brita and Grego, Lobotomia records the fourth album "Desastre", acclaimed by the critics and the fans right after being released, in 2016. Still in 2015, right after the recordings of the new album the band toured Europe for the third time. In 2016 the album has a disclosure tour in Brazil and an unprecedented tour of Mexico. The tour involves 14 concerts in 12 cities and surprises the band with the number of fans and welcome.

The band has done material and set a European tour in 2018. After that the drummer Grego moved to another country, Lobotomia was disbanded again.

In 2024, the band reunited to commemorate their 40th anniversary.

== Last lineup ==
- Renato (vocals)
- Gabriel Kaspar (guitars)
- Daniel Brita (bass)
- Grego (drums)

== Discography ==
=== Studio albums ===
- Lobotomia (1986)
- Nada É Como Parece (1989)
- Extinção (2009)
- Desastre (2016)
