= Laranja Freak =

Brazilian psychedelic band

Laranja Freak is a psychedelic band from Porto Alegre, Brazil. It appeared in 1997 and makes what it calls "Frantic Psychedelic Music", making a compound between the Jovem Guarda, psychedelia and rock.

The band members are: Ricardo Farfisa (vocals, keyboards and guitar), Evandro Martins (bass), Miro Rasolini (drums), Ivanez Bernardi (vocals and guitar), and Alexandre Abreu (lead guitar).

Laranja Freak has appeared inside and outside its home state, participating at festivals such as Bananada (GO), Senhor F Festival (SC and RS), 25 Anos de Baratos Afins (SP), Cabron Festival (SC), Super Noites Senhor F (DF), and Gig Porto Alegre Rock (RS), among others.

== Albums ==
- Música Psicodélica Frenética (2001 - Independent)
- Entre as Moléculas (2002 - Migué Records)
- Brasas Lisérgicas (2004 - Baratos Afins), competed for the Dynamite/Claro award of best rock album of 2004.
- Laboratório do Alberto ou Albert Hoffmann (2009 - Senhor F)
- Alguns Janeiros Nas Costas (2016 - Baratos Afins)

Also, they participated of the compilations "Brazilian Peebles II" (2002 - Baratos Afins), released in Brazil and in Japan, "Ainda Somos Inúteis! Um Tributo ao Ultraje a Rigor" (2005 - Monstro Discos), "Clássicos da Noite Senhor F" (2005 - Senhor F Discos), "Eu Não Sou Cachorro Mesmo" (2006 - Allegro Discos), "The Rough Guide To Psychedelic Brazil (2013 - World Music) and The Rough Guide to a World of Psychedelia (WMN, England, 2016). It still participated of the soundtrack of the short movies "A Sopa" (2003) and "Veludos e Cacos de Vidro" (2004), of Marco Martins, with the song Sempre Livre.
