= Não Wave =

Não Wave is a series of three albums (one compilation and two extended plays) released between 2005 and 2008 by German independent record company Man Recordings. Não Wave is Portuguese for "no wave", in an allusion to the artistic scene that had its beginnings during the late 1970s through the mid-1980s in New York City characterized by heavy experimentation.

== Não Wave ==
Não Wave

Compilation album by Various artists
- Released: 2005-04-25
- Recorded: 1980s
- Genre: Post-punk, alternative rock, new wave, garage rock, gothic rock, punk rock, synthpop, indie rock
- Label: Man Recordings
- Producer: Andy Cumming

Professional ratings
Review scores
Source	Rating
Pitchfork Media	7.9/10 stars

The first Não Wave compilation album was released on 25 April 2005 and was the first album Man Recordings ever released. It contains a collection of songs from various bands and artists that formed the São Paulo underground post-punk scene of the early 1980s (with the exception of Black Future and Vzyadoq Moe, who hail from Rio de Janeiro and Sorocaba, respectively).

Of all bands present in the compilation, only Ira! would achieve mainstream success during its lifespan.

=== Track listing ===
No.	Title	Artist	Length
1.	"Agentss"	Agentss	4:51
2.	"Eu Sou o Rio"	Black Future	4:43
3.	"O Futebol"	Akira S. e as Garotas que Erraram	1:59
4.	"Sobre as Pernas"	Akira S. e as Garotas que Erraram	4:37
5.	"Ciências Sensuais"	Azul 29	5:15
6.	"Samba do Morro"	Chance	4:31
7.	"Teu Inglês"	Fellini	3:35
8.	"Funziona Senza Vapore"	Fellini	2:26
9.	"Lá Fora Pode Até Morrer"	Ira!	3:04
10.	"Prince no Deserto Vermelho"	Akt	2:45
11.	"Redenção"	Vzyadoq Moe	2:54
12.	"Polícia"	Mercenárias	0:59
13.	"Ilha Urbana"	Muzak	3:20
14.	"Ioiô"	Voluntários da Pátria	1:58

== Não Wave Revisited ==
Não Wave Revisited

EP by Various artists
- Released: 2005-10-21
- Genre: Post-punk, synthpop, electronica
- Label: Man Recordings
- Producer: Daniel Haaksman

Professional ratings
Review scores
Source	Rating
PopMatters	5/10 stars

Não Wave Revisited is an EP released by Man Recordings on 21 October 2005, six months after Não Wave. It features four selected tracks of the original Não Wave compilation remixed by different DJs/electronica groups.

=== Track listing ===
No.	Title	Artist	Length
1.	"Agentss (Glimmers' Slowdance Remix)"	The Glimmers	6:08
2.	"Eu Sou o Rio (Munk Mix)"	Munk	5:39
3.	"Ioiô (Tim Love Edit)"	Tim "Love" Lee	3:33
4.	"Ciências Sensuais (Marco Edit)"	Marco	5:15

== Não Wave Re-Revisited ==
Não Wave Re-Revisited

EP by Various artists
- Released: 2008-10-30
- Genre: Post-punk, synthpop, electronica
- Label: Man Recordings
- Producer: Daniel Haaksman

Não Wave Re-Revisited is the third and, as of yet, last remix album based on the original Não Wave compilation, released by Man Recordings in 2008. Being the shortest of all three, it features outtakes of Não Wave Revisited, remixed by different DJs/electronica groups.

=== Track listing ===
No.	Title	Artist	Length
1.	"Agentss (NoMoHeroes Mix)"	NoMoHeroes
2.	"Agentss (Anvil Mix)"	Anvil FX
3.	"Eu Sou o Rio (Telephones Mix)"	Telephones

== See also ==
- The Sexual Life of the Savages
- Não São Paulo, Vol. 1
- Não São Paulo, Vol. 2
- No wave
