= Amor Louco =

Studio album by Fellini
- Released: February 15, 1990 (re-released in 2001)
- Recorded: 1989
- Genres: Post-punk, samba rock
- Label: Wop-Bop Records (CD re-release by RDS)
- Producer: R. H. Jackson

Fellini chronology
3 Lugares Diferentes (1987)	Amor Louco (1990)	Amanhã É Tarde (2002)

Cadão Volpato chronology
3 Lugares Diferentes (1987)	Amor Louco (1990)	Amanhã É Tarde (2002)

Amor Louco (Portuguese for Mad Love) is the fourth studio album by Brazilian post-punk band Fellini. It was released on February 15, 1990, by now-defunct independent record label Wop-Bop Records and re-released in CD form in 2001 by another independent label, RDS. It was originally Fellini's last album, due to their break-up in the following year; however, they reunited in 2001 and released another album, Amanhã É Tarde. After his absence from the previous album, Jair Marcos returned as the guitarist, thus having Fellini's original line-up once more.

Amor Louco is characterized for the diminished "scuzzy" post-punk-esque instrumentation, instead adopting a more light-hearted style reminiscent of samba rock, bossa nova and MPB. It is also their first album to feature lyrics written in English, them being "Chico Buarque Song" and "Love Till the Morning".

The track "LSD" narrates an experience frontman Cadão Volpato had when he used lysergic acid diethylamide.

== Track listing ==
All lyrics are written by Cadão Volpato; all music is composed by Jair Marcos, Thomas Pappon, Ricardo Salvagni and Cadão Volpato.

No.	Title	English title	Length
1.	"Chico Buarque Song"		4:21
2.	"Amor Louco"	Mad Love	2:31
3.	"Clepsidra"	Water Clock	3:21
4.	"Cidade Irmã"	Sister City	4:29
5.	"LSD"		3:21
6.	"Você É Música"	You Are Music	2:22
7.	"Love Till the Morning"		4:45
8.	"Grandes Ilusões"	Great Illusions	3:41
9.	"Samba das Luzes"	The Lights' Samba	4:04
10.	"Città più Bella"	Most Beautiful Town	4:51
11.	"Kandinsky Song"		3:13
12.	"É o Destino"	It's Destiny	3:43
13.	"Aeroporto"	Airport	2:23

== Notes ==
- "Aeroporto" is an acoustic bonus track.
- The CD re-release merges the tracks "É o Destino" and "Aeroporto" into one, thus making a single track with 5:58 minutes long and making "Aeroporto" a hidden bonus track.

== Personnel ==
Fellini

- Cadão Volpato — vocals, harmonica, keyboards
- Jair Marcos — acoustic guitar, backing vocals
- Ricardo Salvagni — bass, rhythm programming
- Thomas Pappon — acoustic guitar, backing vocals, rhythm programming

Additional personnel

- Tancred Pappon — cavaquinho (on tracks 6, 9)
- Karla Xavier — female backing vocals (on track 9)
- R.H Jackson — rhythm programming (on track 7)

Miscellaneous staff

- Recorded from June to November 1989 at OBJ Studio (16 channels), São Paulo
- Célia Saito — photography
- Cadão Volpato — cover (drawing)
- N artes — final art
- R. H. Jackson and Fellini — production and mixing
- Benoni Rubmaier — remastering (cd version)
- Remastered in Y B studios
- Alex Cecci — A & R
- Adaptation and Photolithography — 23 design
- 1989 end of the Berlin Wall
