= O Começo do Fim do Mundo =

- Date: 27–28 November 1982
- Venue: SESC Pompeia
- Location: São Paulo, São Paulo, Brazil; 23°31′33″S 46°41′00.2″W

O Começo do Fim do Mundo ("The Beginning of the End of the World") was a Brazilian punk festival held in São Paulo in 1982.

== History ==
Organized by Antônio Bivar and Callegari (Inocentes guitarist), the event was held at SESC Pompéia in São Pauloon 27 and 28 November 1982, aiming to unite punk groups and gangs, both from São Paulo itself and the neighboring ABC cities, which back at that time were engulfed in increasingly violent clashes. The festival featured an exhibition of materials (albums, fanzines and films) and concerts. A total of 20 bands performed and around 3,000 people attended the event. While the first day went by with no agitations, police stormed in the venue on the second day in order to burn documents related to the then-ruling military dictatorship and to use tear gas against attendees, forcing many to take shelter in a Christian Church. Some fights were also registered.

The festival was recorded in tape-deck format and released in LP and later CD format.

In 2016, SESC released a documentary titled O Fim do Mundo, Enfim ("The End of the World, At Last"), containing recordings and interviews and directed by Camila Miranda.

In 2017, label Nada Nada Discos released an extended version of the LP, a double one, with 23 extra songs and pictures by American photographer Paul Constantinides. A re-release concert was held at SESC Pompeia on 26 November featuring a specially-assembled band consisting of Clemente (Inocentes), Mingau (Ratos de Porão) and Muniz (Fogo Cruzado) reproducing the entire album live with members of Cólera, Lixomania, Olho Seco, Ulster, Skisitas, Dose Brutal, Neuróticos, Juízo Final, Suburbanos, Hino Mortal, Inocentes and Fogo Cruzado.

Some images were also recorded in video and some can be seen on the documentary Botinada: a Origem do Punk no Brasil ("Botinada: The Origin of Punk in Brazil), by Gastão Moreira.

== Line-up ==
The festival was held across two days at SESC Pompeia, involving 20 bands (10 on each day) that pioneered punk rock in São Paulo and the ABC Region.

=== 27 November (Saturday) ===
- Inocentes
- Cólera
- Lixomania
- Ratos de Porão
- Ulster
- Fogo Cruzado
- M-19
- Neuróticos
- Estado de Coma
- Juízo Final

=== 28 November (Sunday) ===
- Olho Seco
- Extermínio
- Hino Mortal
- Submundo
- Negligentes
- Greve Geral
- Dose Dupla
- Pacto Social
- Passeatas
- Desequilíbrio
