= Vange (album) =

Studio album by Vange Leonel
- Released: 1991
- Genre: Post-punk, alternative rock
- Length: 45:57
- Label: Sony Music Entertainment
- Producer: Nando Reis, Charles Gavin

Vange Leonel chronology
| Nau (1987) | Vange (1991) | Vermelho (1996) |

Vange is the solo debut album by Brazilian musician and former Nau member Vange Leonel. It was released in 1991 by Sony Music Entertainment, and produced by Nando Reis (Vange's cousin) and Charles Gavin. Both were members of popular rock band Titãs at the time.

The album spawned the hit single "Noite Preta"; it was used as the opening theme of the popular telenovela Vamp, that premiered also in 1991 and ran until 1992. A music video was shot for the track, directed by Cilmara Bedaque (Vange's songwriting partner since the times of her former band Nau) and Luiz Ferré. "Esse Mundo" would be used as the opening theme for another telenovela a year later, Perigosas Peruas, that ran from February to August 1992.

"Divino, Maravilhoso" is a cover of the famous Gal Costa song, originally performed by her on her self-titled 1969 debut album. It was written and composed by Caetano Veloso and Gilberto Gil.

== Track listing ==
All lyrics are written by Cilmara Bedaque and Vange Leonel, except where noted.

| No. | Title | Lyrics | Length |
|---|---|---|---|
| 1. | "Noite Preta" (Black Night) | | 4:15 |
| 2. | "Mulher-Lobo" (Wolf-Woman) | | 4:42 |
| 3. | "S/A" | | 3:28 |
| 4. | "Por Que?" (Why?) | | 3:36 |
| 5. | "Jane" | | 4:53 |
| 6. | "Esse Mundo" (This World) | | 4:26 |
| 7. | "Passeio Distraído" (Distracted Walk) | | 4:20 |
| 8. | "Vida, Vida, Vida" (Life, Life, Life) | | 4:21 |
| 9. | "Mil Anos" (A Thousand Years) | | 3:07 |
| 10. | "Divino, Maravilhoso" (Divine, Wonderful – Gal Costa cover) | Caetano Veloso, Gilberto Gil | 3:42 |
| 11. | "Felizes" (Happy) | | 5:02 |

- "Felizes" was not included on the vinyl issue of the album.

== Personnel ==
- Vange Leonel – vocals, rhythm guitar
- Nando Reis – guitar, bass guitar, production
- Charles Gavin – drums, production
