= Antônio Bivar =

Brazilian writer (1939–2020)

- Born: Antônio Bivar Battistetti Lima; April 25, 1939; São Paulo, São Paulo, Brazil
- Died: July 5, 2020 (aged 81); São Paulo, São Paulo, Brazil
- Occupation: Writer
- Language: Portuguese
- Genre: Nonfiction, Memoir, Biography
- Literary movement: Beat Generation

Antônio Bivar Battistetti Lima (25 April 1939 – 5 July 2020), better known simply as Antônio Bivar, was a Brazilian writer of the Beat Generation and playwright.

== Life ==
Born in São Paulo in 1939, Bivar moved to Ribeirão Preto in his teens and later worked as office assistant and office boy.

At the age of 21 he joined the Conservatório Nacional de Teatro in Rio de Janeiro, where he studied Performing arts.

In 1968, his plays Cordélia Brasil and Abre a janela e deixa entrar o ar puro e o sol da manhã both helped him win the Molière Award for best Playwright.

Between 1970 and 1972, Bivar spent most of his time traveling overseas due to his deteriorating relationship with the Brazilian military government. During his trips he saw the birth of the Punk subculture in London and became fascinated with the movement.

In the 1980s, Bivar started writing books. His favorite genres were biography and memoir and his favorite subjects were theatre, punk culture and the beatnik movement.

In 1982, Bivar organized O Começo do Fim do Mundo, Brazil's first punk festival which was held in his native São Paulo.

== Death ==
On 5 July 2020, Bivar died in São Paulo at the age of 81 due to complications brought on by COVID-19 during the COVID-19 pandemic in Brazil.

== Bibliography ==
- Simone de Beauvoir, pare de fumar, siga o exemplo de Gildinha Saraiva e comece a trabalhar, play, 1964
- Cordélia Brasil, play, 1967
- Abre a janela e deixa entrar o ar puro e o sol da manhã, play, 1968
- O cão siamês, play, 1969
- A passagem da rainha, play, 1969
- Longe daqui, aqui mesmo, play, 1971
- Alzira Power, play, 1973
- Gente fina é outra coisa, play, 1976
- Quarteto, play, 1976
- O que é punk, 1982
- A passagem da rainha, play, 1984
- James Dean, biography, 1984
- Verdes vales do fim do mundo, memoir, 1985
- Alice, que delícia!, play, 1987
- Chic-a-boom, 1991
- Longe daqui, aqui mesmo, memoir/travel, 1995
- A três primeiras peças, 2002
- Yolanda, biography, 2004
- Jack Kerouac: o rei dos beatniks, biography, 2005
- Bivar na corte de Bloomsbury, 2005
- Histórias do Brasil Para Teatro, 2007
- Contos atrevidos, 2009
- O Teatro de Antônio Bivar/As Três Primeiras peças, 2010
- Mundo adentro vida afora, memoir, 2014
- Aos quatro ventos, biography, 2016
- Punk, 2018
- Perseverança, 2019
