= Fellini (band) =

Brazilian rock band

- Origin: São Paulo, Brazil
- Genres: Post-punk, MPB, samba rock, experimental rock, art rock
- Years active: 1984–1990; 2002–2010; 2016
- Labels: Baratos Afins, Wop-Bop Records, Midsummer Madness
- Past members: Cadão Volpato; Jair Marcos; Ricardo Salvagni; Thomas Pappon; Celso Pucci

Fellini was a Brazilian rock band formed in São Paulo in 1984 by Cadão Volpato (vocals, harmonica), Jair Marcos (guitar), Ricardo Salvagni (drums and percussion), and former Voluntários da Pátria and Smack member Thomas Pappon (bass and occasionally other instruments). One of the most well-known bands of the Brazilian underground scene of the mid-1980s (and having a strong cult following to the present day), Fellini originally began as a straightforward post-punk band influenced by acts such as Joy Division, The Stranglers and The Durutti Column, but would gradually develop a more eclectic sonority that mixed post-punk with other genres such as MPB, new wave and samba rock, acquiring a unique, almost non-descript musical style.

Fellini was first disestablished in 1990, but re-established in 2002 until ending again in 2010. A further reunion of the band was announced in early 2016.

== History ==
Fellini was founded in 1984 by Cadão Volpato, Thomas Pappon and Celso Pucci (or Minho K.), being later joined by Jair Marcos and Ricardo Salvagni. The band's name was coined by Thomas Pappon during a brainstorm; he wanted the band to have a "weird, funny-sounding" name (in contrast to the "serious" and "gloomy" names Brazilian post-punk bands had at the time), and chose "Fellini" as a homage to The Stranglers' album Feline, one of Fellini's major influences alongside Joy Division and The Durutti Column. Fellini performed their first show at the now-defunct Bar Albergue, in Bixiga; however, Minho K. could not play at the gig because he was drunk at the time, passed out and could not wake up. He left the band afterwards, and would form 3 Hombres alongside Jair Marcos years later. Pucci died in 2002 of oral cancer.

In late 1984, Fellini obtained a contract with independent record label Baratos Afins, and released their debut album, O Adeus de Fellini, in 1985, which contained underground hits such as "Rock Europeu" and "Funziona Senza Vapore". It would be followed by 1986's Fellini Só Vive 2 Vezes, 1987's 3 Lugares Diferentes (which Cadão Volpato considers to be Fellini's finest album, and was also their last release via Baratos Afins) and 1990's Amor Louco. However, the band broke up in the same year, with Cadão Volpato alleging that he was tired of the band's hectic performance schedule and wanted to give more emphasis on his "intellectual pretensions". Also, Thomas Pappon moved to Germany (and later to England) in the same year, leaving Fellini to form alongside his wife Karla the duo The Gilbertos.

In 1992, Cadão Volpato formed a very short-lived "spiritual successor" to Fellini named Funziona Senza Vapore (after Fellini's eponymous song, present in their debut album). It comprised original Fellini members Jair Marcos and Ricardo Salvagni, plus Stela Campos replacing Thomas Pappon. They recorded also in 1992 a homonymous obscure album, that was only released in 2002.

After a 12-year hiatus, Fellini returned in 2002, releasing a new studio album, Amanhã É Tarde. In 2003 they played at the TIM Festival alongside Beth Gibbons and Los Hermanos, subsequently doing some other sporadic shows. In 2010 they released a compilation featuring re-recordings of previous songs, Você Nem Imagina, before breaking up again.

In 2015 Volpato and Pappon reunited to form the experimental rock duo Pappon & Volpato.

In 2016 the band announced on their official Facebook page that a brief reunion of its original line-up would happen; accompanied by drummer Lauro Lellis, they would play in its entirety their album Amor Louco across some venues in São Paulo beginning in March. According to Cadão Volpato, this would be the last reunion ever of the band, and no further performances are scheduled.

== Discography ==
=== Studio albums ===
Year	Album
1985	O Adeus de Fellini: Label: Baratos Afins
1986	Fellini Só Vive 2 Vezes: Label: Baratos Afins
1987	3 Lugares Diferentes: Label: Baratos Afins
1990	Amor Louco: Label: Wop-Bop Records
2002	Amanhã É Tarde: Label: Midsummer Madness
2010	Você Nem Imagina: Label: Tratore/Fonomatic

=== Compilation ===
- Sanguinho Novo... Arnaldo Baptista Revisitado (1989)

Featured the song "Cê Tá Pensando que Eu Sou Lóki?"

- The Sexual Life of the Savages (2005)

Featured the songs "Zum Zum Zum Zazoeira" and "Rock Europeu"

- Não Wave (2005)

Featured the songs "Funziona Senza Vapore" and "Teu Inglês"

- Você Nem Imagina (2010)

=== Singles ===
- Pânico / Rock Europeu (split single with Mercenárias — 2005)

=== Unreleased songs ===
- "Milho" ("Corn")
- "Mosca" ("Fly")

== Trivia ==
Mangue Bit band Nação Zumbi, while being still led by now-deceased Chico Science, made a cover of Funziona Senza Vapore's song "Criança de Domingo" ("Sunday Child"), that was included in the CD re-release of their 1996 album Afrociberdelia. Science was noted for being a huge fan of Fellini.

== See also ==
- Funziona Senza Vapore
