= Inocentes =

Brazilian punk rock band

- Origin: Brazil - São Paulo
- Genres: Punk rock, post-punk
- Years active: 1981–present
- Labels: Punk Rock Discos; Cameratti; Eldorado; Paradoxx Music; Abril Music; RDS; Ataque Frontal; Monstro Discos; Warner Music
- Members: Clemente Nascimento; Ronaldo Passos; Nonô; Anselmo Monstro
- Past members: André Parlato; Antônio Carlos Calegari; Antônio "Tonhão" Parlato; Ariel Uliana Jr. César Romaro; Marcelino Gonzales; Mingau
- Website: inocentes.com.br

Inocentes is one of the oldest active punk rock bands in Brazil. The group was formed in 1981 by former members of pioneer local punk bands Restos de Nada and Condutores de Cadáver.

During their first incarnation in the first half of the 1980s, Inocentes played basic energetic and politically charged hardcore punk, exemplified by the Grito Suburbano compilation tracks and their 7" EP "Miséria e Fome".

The original band split up in 1984, but frontman Clemente Nascimento put a new line up together a few months later with former members of São Paulo Oi! band Neuróticos. The new line up dropped the hardcore influences and adopted a cleaner, more melodic sound mixing punk, post-punk and other influences. In July 2016, their 1986 album Pânico em SP was elected by Rolling Stone Brasil as the 6th best Brazilian punk rock album.

Apart from some line up changes over the years, Inocentes are still active, always led by Nascimento, who has also been playing guitar for Brasília post-punk veterans Plebe Rude since the mid-2000s.

== Discography ==
| Year | Title | Label |
|---|---|---|
| 1982 | Grito Suburbano | Punk Rock Discos |
| 1983 | O Começo do Fim do Mundo | SESC |
| 1983 | Miséria e Fome | Inocentes Discos |
| 1984 | Life is a Joke | Weird System |
| 1984 | Volks Grito | Vinnyl Boogie |
| 1986 | Pânico em SP | Warner |
| 1987 | Adeus Carne | Warner |
| 1988 | Miséria e Fome | Devil Discos |
| 1989 | Inocentes | Warner |
| 1992 | Estilhaços | Camerati |
| 1994 | Subterrâneos | Eldorado |
| 1996 | Ruas | Paradoxx |
| 1999 | Embalado a Vácuo | Abril Music |
| 1999 | Garotos do Subúrbio | RDS |
| 2000 | O Barulho dos Inocentes | Abril Music |
| 2002 | Vinte Anos ao Vivo | RDS |
| 2004 | Labirinto | Ataque Frontal |
| 2013 | Sob Controle | Substantial Music |
