= The Sexual Life of the Savages =

Compilation album by various artists
- Released: 2005
- Recorded: 1980s
- Genre: Post-punk
- Label: Soul Jazz
- Producer: Bruno Verner, Eliete Mejorado

The Sexual Life of the Savages (subtitled Underground Post-Punk from São Paulo, Brazil) is a compilation album produced by Bruno Verner and Eliete Mejorado (the components of avant-garde music duo Tetine), and released in 2005 by British record company Soul Jazz Records. It contains a collection of songs from various artists that formed the São Paulo post-punk movement of the early 1980s. The album's name is an allusion to a verse of the song "Nosso Louco Amor" by Gang 90 e as Absurdettes, one of the bands present in the compilation.

Depicted in the album's front cover is Patife Band's frontman Paulo Barnabé.

== Critical reception ==
Professional ratings
Review scores
Source	Rating
PopMatters	7/10
Pitchfork	7.8/10

The album received positive reviews. Scott Hreha of PopMatters stated: "If there's one drawback to the disc as a whole, it's the relative transparency of many of the bands' inspirations, which doesn't diminish its importance as much as it makes for an entertaining critical exercise". Hreha also praised the album's "remastered sound" and "availability", noting that "most of this music was recorded for independent labels that have long since folded". Pitchfork critic Nitsuh Abebe wrote that the album "doubles up tracks on key artists and feels mixed for continuity". Abebe further stated: "It kicks off with its most accessible pop and then swings, as befits a Soul Jazz product, into a midsection that piles on the funk".

== Track listing ==
No.	Title	Artist	Length
1.	"Inimigo"	Mercenárias	1:27
2.	"Pânico"	Mercenárias	1:53
3.	"Sobre as Pernas"	Akira S. e as Garotas que Erraram	4:37
4.	"Swing Basses Series I (Eu Dirijo o Carro-Bomba)"	Akira S. e as Garotas que Erraram	1:12
5.	"Rock Europeu"	Fellini	3:44
6.	"Jack Kerouac"	Gang 90 e as Absurdettes	4:29
7.	"Samba do Morro"	Chance	4:31
8.	"Poema em Linha Reta"	Patife Band	2:03
9.	"Teu Bem"	Patife Band	3:43
10.	"Borboleta Psicodélica"	Gueto	3:02
11.	"Madame Oráculo"	Nau	2:55
12.	"O Striptease de Mme. X"	Chance	6:01
13.	"Fora Daqui"	Smack	3:00
14.	"Mediocridade Afinal"	Smack	4:03
15.	"Zum Zum Zum Zazoeira"	Fellini	5:35
16.	"Ilha Urbana"	Muzak	3:20
17.	"Tão Perto"	Cabine C	2:33
18.	"You Have Gone Wrong"	Harry	5:08

== Personnel ==
Technical personnel

- Bruno Verner – production, compiling
- Eliete Mejorado – production, compiling
- Adrian Self – cover art
- Quid Proque – cover art
- Duncan Cowell – mastering
- Pete Reilly – mastering

== See also ==
- Não Wave
- Não São Paulo, Vol. 1
- Não São Paulo, Vol. 2
