= Midsummer Madness (record label) =

Brazilian record label

Midsummer Madness are a Brazilian independent record label based in Rio de Janeiro. The label began life in 1989 as a photocopied fanzine, then in 1991 they first branched into releasing music when they included a cassette compilation album with the fourth edition of the 'zine. In 1994, a second cassette was issued with the fifth 'zine. This same year the organisation made further moves toward becoming a full-blown record label when they stopped working on further fanzines and dedicated their efforts instead to releasing cassettes of Brazilian indie music, starting with music from The Drivellers and The Cigarettes.

In 1997 midsummer madness released its first two CDs: Pelvs' Members to Sunna and The Cigarettes' Bingo. In the same year, the fledgling label opened a website, which has proved important in getting the label's music heard more widely, especially since its update in 2005 to include streaming and downloadable music samples plus an online shop for purchasing EP's. In 1998 the label promoted its own festival in Rio called Algumas Pessoas Tentam Te F*der (which is a Portuguese translation of the title of a Teenage Fanclub song), and this festival has been reprised in subsequent years.

Since 1991, Midsummer Madness has released a total of 79 EPs (distributed as cassettes, CDs and MP3s), twenty CD albums and more than 500 songs. Unofficial counters mark more than 5,000 cassettes and more than 18.000 CDs sold as at June 2008. The owner of Midsummer Madness is Rodrigo Lariu.

== Discography ==
mmcd01 The Cigarettes – Bingo

mmcd02 Pelvs – Members to Sunna

mmcd03 The Gilbertos – Eurosambas 1992 – 1998

mmcd04 Stellar – Ultramar

mmcd05 Astromato – Melodias de uma Estrela Falsa

mmcd06 Pelvs – Peninsula

mmcd07 Casino – EP

mmcd08 Fellini – Amanhã É Tarde

== Official website ==
http://www.mmrecords.com.br (Portuguese version)

https://web.archive.org/web/20080820103842/http://en.mmrecords.com.br/ (English version)
