= Cólera =

Brazilian punk rock band from São Paulo

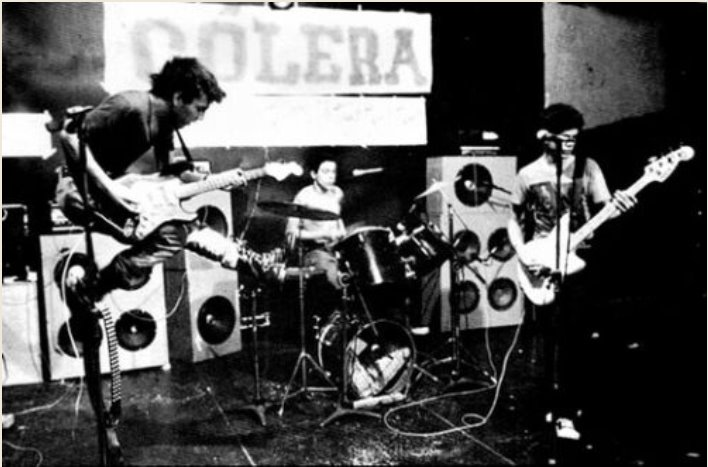
- Cólera live in São Paulo, Brazil, 1985

Background information
- Origin: São Paulo, Brazil
- Genres: Punk rock; hardcore punk
- Years active: 1979–present
- Labels: Ataque Frontal; A. Indie Records; Devil Discos
- Members: Wendel Barros; Pierre; Val; Fabio Belluci
- Past members: Anselmo; Redson; Helinho; Fábio Bossi; Josué Correia
- Website: Cólera Official Website

Cólera (Portuguese for cholera) is a Brazilian punk rock band formed in October 1979 in São Paulo, by the brothers Redson (guitar and lead vocals) and Pierre (drums) and their friend Val (bass guitar). They are currently one of the oldest punk bands in activity in Brazil, with a career that spans 45 years. They have toured Europe four times, in 1987, 2004, 2008 and 2023.

On September 28, 2011, Redson died from stomach bleeding at the age of 49. Cólera continues to play with a new formation: Wendel Barros on vocals and Fabio Belluci on guitar. In July 2016, their 1986 album Pela Paz em Todo o Mundo was elected by Rolling Stone Brasil as the 2nd best Brazilian punk rock album. Their album Acorde, Acorde, Acorde was elected among the 25 best Brazilian albums of the second half of 2018 by the São Paulo Association of Art Critics.

== Discography ==
=== Albums ===
- Tente Mudar o Amanhã (1985) - Ataque Frontal
- Pela Paz Em Todo o Mundo (1986) - Ataque Frontal
- Cólera European Tour '87 (1988) - A. Indie Records
- Verde, Não Devaste! (1989) - Devil Discos
- Mundo Mecânico, Mundo Eletrônico (1991) - Devil Discos
- Caos Mental Geral (1998) - Devil Discos
- 20 Anos ao Vivo (2002) - Devil Discos
- Deixe a Terra em Paz! (2004) - Devil Discos
- The Best Of - Alemanha (2004) - Dirty Faces
- Primeiros Sintomas (2006)
- Acorde! Acorde! Acorde! (2018) - EAEO Records

=== EPs ===
- Dê o Fora (1986) - Hageland Records
- É Natal!!? (1987) - Ataque Frontal
- Está na Hora de Mudar! (2023)

=== Compilations ===
- Grito Suburbano (1982) - Punk Rock Discos
- SUB (1983) - Estúdios Vermelhos (LP), Devil Discos (CD)
- O Começo do Fim do Mundo (1983) - SESC
- Beating The Meat (1984) - Excentric Noise Records
- Ataque Sonoro (1985) - Ataque Frontal
- Tropical Viruses #1 (1985) - BCT
- Empty Skulls Vol.2 (1986) - Fart Blossom Enterprises
- Bunker (1987) - Bunker Musyk
- 1984, The Third Sonic World War (1988) - New Wave Records
- Tributo ao Olho Seco (2000) - Redstar Records
- Compilação Beneficente PEA (2005)

=== Splits ===
- Ratos de Porão/Cólera ao vivo (1985) - Ataque Frontal
