= Edgard Scandurra =

Brazilian singer and composer

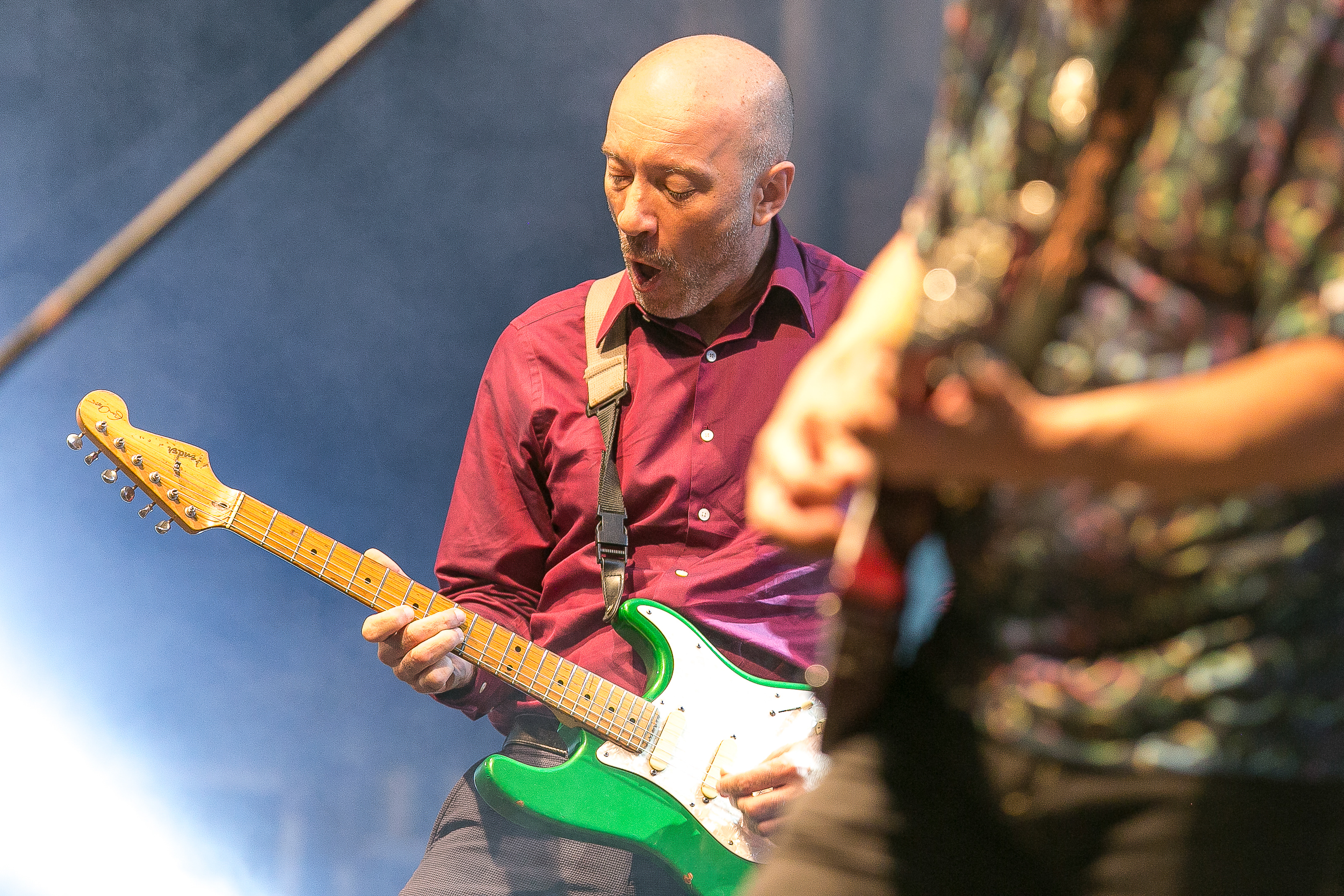
- Edgard Scandurra in 2014

Background information
- Born: February 5, 1962 (age 63)
- Genres: Alternative rock; Brazilian rock; Punk rock
- Occupation(s): Musician, composer
- Instrument(s): Vocals, drums, guitar
- Years active: 1977–present
- Website: edgardscandurra.com.br

Edgard José Scandurra Pereira (born 5 February 1962) is a Brazilian singer, composer, guitar player, drummer and musical director, who is a member of the Brazilian rock band Ira!.

Before joining Ira!, Edgard was a member of Ultraje a Rigor. He has also made several guest appearances with other Brazilian bands and artists such as Kid Abelha, Vange Milliet, Os Paralamas do Sucesso, Vespas Mandarinas, Lobão and Guilherme Arantes.
