= Ira! =

Brazilian alternative rock band

- Ira! in 2005. From left to right: André Jung (former member), Nasi, Edgard Scandurra and Ricardo Gaspa (former member).

Background information
- Origin: São Paulo, Brazil
- Genres: Post-punk, mod revival
- Years active: 1981–2007; 2014–present
- Labels: WEA, Deckdisc, Sony, Universal
- Members: Nasi; Edgard Scandurra; Johnny Boy; Evaristo Pádua
- Past members: Fábio Scattone †; Victor Leite †; Adilson Fajardo †; Charles Gavin; Dino Nascimento †; André Jung; Ricardo Gaspa; Daniel Scandurra
- Website: www.iraoficial.com

Ira! (Portuguese for Anger! or Rage!, although the name was inspired by the Irish Republican Army) is a Brazilian rock band that was founded in São Paulo in the early 1980s. They were strongly influenced by the Mod sound of The Who, the hard rock of Led Zeppelin and the punk rock of The Clash.

== History ==
Led by singer Nasi and guitarist Edgard Scandurra, with Ricardo Gaspa on bass and André Jung on drums, Ira! was at the height of their success in the mid-to-late 1980s. Songs like "Núcleo Base", "Flores em Você" and "Envelheço na Cidade" were huge hits when first released and still enjoy considerable airplay in radio stations throughout Brazil. The band had a decline in productivity and popularity during the 1990s, but regained popularity after playing before an audience of over 250,000 at the third edition of the Rock in Rio festival in 2001 and doing an acoustic special for MTV Brasil in 2004.

In September 2007, just before the band were due to have a break, Nasi departed from the band after a conflict with Airton Valadão Rodolfo, who was the band manager and also Nasi's brother.

In November 2007, Edgard Scandurra announced that Ira! had split up and the remaining members would follow their careers separately.

On 27 June 2012, Nasi and Airton announced to the press that they have been reconciled after more than five years of court and public battles. The brothers stated that they would settle all the pending legal prosecutions that one had targeted the other. It was agreed that the brand 'Ira!', which was a property of Airton, would return to Nasi. The rumor of a possible Ira! reunion was denied, though. Nasi stated in his Facebook profile and on his personal blog that he had no immediate plan to reunite the group, although he was open to get on good terms with Edgard Scandurra.

On 22 November 2025, the band announced through their social media profiles the death of original bassist and founding member Dino Nascimento.

== Discography ==
=== Studio albums ===
- (1985) Mudança de Comportamento
- (1986) Vivendo e Não Aprendendo
- (1988) Psicoacústica
- (1990) Clandestino
- (1991) Meninos da Rua Paulo
- (1993) Música Calma para Pessoas Nervosas
- (1995) 7
- (1998) Você Não Sabe Quem Eu Sou
- (1999) Isso é Amor
- (2001) Entre Seus Rins
- (2007) Invisível DJ
- (2020) IRA

=== Live/video albums ===
- (2000) MTV ao Vivo: Ira!
- (2004) Acústico MTV: Ira!
- (2007) Invisível DJ (live in studio)
- (2011) Ira! e Ultraje a Rigor ao Vivo no Rock in Rio (with Ultraje a Rigor)
- (2017) Ira! Folk (Ao Vivo em São Paulo - Março 2017)
