= Baratos Afins =

Brazilian record label and store

- Founded: 1978
- Founder: Luiz Calanca
- Genre: Various.
- Country of origin: Brazil
- Official website: http://www.baratosafins.com.br/

Baratos Afins is a long-established Brazilian record label and store, based in São Paulo city.

Baratos Afins is an indie record label operating in São Paulo City, Brazil. It was founded by Luiz Calanca in 1978, first as a record shop and later as a label. The idea for the label came about when Arnaldo Baptista, ex-vocalist and bassist for Os Mutantes arranged with Calanca to release his second solo album independently. Thus Baratos Afins history became forever intertwined with the (hi)story of rock in São Paulo. From then on the label released seminal albums by São Paulo's best upcoming underground rock acts: Fellini, Kafka, Vultos, Akira S. e as Garotas que Erraram, Voluntários da Pátria, Gueto, Smack, 3 Hombres and Mercenárias. The compilation Não São Paulo brought together four new bands and was so well received that a second volume was put together. All these bands possessed a heavy post punk influence but Baratos (as lovingly referred to by most record buying fans) did not intend to associate itself with any crowd in particular, and soon released the first heavy metal albums produced in Brazil: SP Metal, Volumes one and two. These albums included bands such as Korzus, Salário Mínimo… The albums even caught the attention of an up-and-coming young band from Minas Gerais state: Sepultura.

== Re-releases ==
The label also began a campaign to re-release albums by Os Mutantes (Arnaldo's old group and one of Kurt Cobain´s favorite bands) that were exchanging hands at exorbitant prices among collectors. The PolyGram label created all kinds of obstacles to dissuade Calanca from licensing the records for release, but, finally, in 1984, Baratos Afins received a batch of all five Mutantes´ albums, thus paving the way for a new generation of rockers (both Brazilian and international) to finally hear one Brazil's first and finest rock bands. Along with os Mutantes the label also re-released long out of print albums by Tom Zé (one of which was picked up by David Byrne in Brazil and taken back to the US and consequently responsible for Tom Zé's discovery in the worldwide music market and his rehabilitation in Brazil's music scene), and Itamar Assumpção (an Afro-Brazilian singer-composer who managed to mix samba, funk and rock and transform it into an intoxicating new urban sound). His work was originally released on another label but was re-released by Baratos, first in vinyl and then in CD.

== In the 90's ==
Baratos began to slowly re-release its albums in CD form, thus reaching a new audience both inside and outside the country. The label also went back to releasing compilations, mainly the two volume Brazilian Pebbles which showcases garage bands worthy of inclusion in the Nuggets collections. The first volume of the series mainly includes bands from São Paulo City, but volume two presents bands from other states and is a feast for those needing a healthy fix of fuzz guitar. The collections proved to be a testing ground for a new underground rock scene in SP populated by bands brought up on a healthy diet of 60's pop rock and 70's punk. Some of these bands proved to be so good that they released their own CDs. Such is the case of Os Skywalkers, Mákina du Tempo, Pipodélica and Gasolines. In addition to these bands Baratos also released an exceptionally fine album by Mopho, from Alagoas state, located in the northeast of Brazil, and a strong contender for best Beatles sound alike band of all time, but with its own updated take on the classic pop sound. All these bands leave nothing to their American and British counterparts. One listen is all it takes for rock aficionados worldwide to agree.

== Jazz Incursion ==
Baratos also released some rather tasty Brazilian jazz albums by trombonist Bocato (unfortunately still unavailable on CD) and is now releasing two CDs by Brazilian guitar legend Lanny Gordin. Lanny set standards for Brazilian rock guitar that have yet to be surpassed, mixing a heavy Jimi Hendrix influence with jazz and Brazilian music. His guitar playing was found on some of the most influential music coming out of Brazil in the late 60's and early 70's: the music of Gilberto Gil, Caetano Veloso, Jards Macalé, Tim Maia and Gal Costa. Together with Arnaldo Baptista, Lanny is one of Brazilian rock's casualties, but he is still capable of making good music which can now be heard on Baratos two new releases. And that is the story so far.

== Current and former signings ==
- 3 Hombres
- A Chave do Sol
- Akira S & as Garotas que Erraram
- Alta Tensão
- Alzira Espíndola
- Arnaldo Baptista
- Atahualpa Y us Panquis
- Ave de Veludo
- Bagga's Guru
- Bocato
- Fellini
- Laranja Freak
- Mercenárias
- Os Skywalkers

== See also ==
- List of record labels
