= Bruno Verner =

Brazilian musician and poet

Bruno Verner (born 1971 in Belo Horizonte) is a Brazilian composer, poet, electronic musician, performance artist and compiler, best known for his work as the other half of Brazilian tropical punk funk duo Tetine which he formed with Eliete Mejorado in São Paulo in 1995.

== Early life ==
Verner was born in the city of Belo Horizonte, Minas Gerais. His mother worked as a primary school teacher, and his father was a pianist. He studied music at Fundação de Educação Artística (FEA) in Belo Horizonte, where he developed an avid interest in contemporary music and the avant-garde, becoming a young composer of electronic music at the age of 17. His piece "Casamento" for 2 sequencers, synthesiser and a sculpture was performed at Ciclo de Música Contemporânea in a programme dedicated to emerging young composers.

== 1980s ==
Verner was an active member of Belo Horizonte's post punk and industrial scene from the mid 1980s as a musician, poet, performer and producer, having played alongside a number of pioneering post punk acts. Over a period spanning from 1985-1990, he sang, played keyboards and bass guitar and programmed drum machines in Brazilian post punk bands such as R. Mutt, Divergencia Socialista, Ida & e Os Voltas, O Grito Mudo, and Albania Berg - electronic and experimental groups from his hometown.

His early work is compiled in cassette tapes and compilations such as Lilith Lunaire, Divergencia Socialista, R. Mutt (R. Mutt), Mulata Urbana (O Grito Mudo), Jovens Raptados (Ida & Os Voltas) Substance (Marcelo Dolabela & Divergencia Socialista)'s. Verner's early tracks with Divergencia Socialista, Tetine, and O Grito Mudo are also included in the compilation Uncorrupted Tropical Wave, 1984-2011 (Slum Dunk 2011).

== 1990 – 2000 ==
In 1990, Bruno Verner moved to São Paulo to study Linguistics at Universidade de São Paulo (USP)and music at Universidade Livre de Musica (ULM). In the early 1990s, he founded the performance group Um Ou Nao.

As a poet and musician, he also conceived and wrote a number of experimental performances involving an unorthodox use of text, sound, improvisation and visuals from 1991 to 1994. From this period, pieces such as I Dada Happening Interdisciplinar, Pressupostos A Uma Sintaxe Sensorial, and O UM were presented in art spaces, underground clubs, bookshops and small cinemas around São Paulo. In 1991, he won the literary prize Projeto Nascente from Universidade de São Paulo, and later published a book of poetry called O UM on Atelier Editorial.

In 1994, Verner met Eliete Mejorado while producing the soundtrack for the performance piece Roberto Zucco at Teatro Oficina. Eliete and Bruno soon found themselves creating a radical blend of atonalism, industrial goth, punk and noise, improvising with a drum machine, an old piano, altered voices, a VCR and slide projectors. Both artists' approach to sound, voice and improvisation was very similar, resulting in the creation of a one-off art performance that they later called Tetine.

In 1995, Tetine was officially born with Alexander’s Grave - a multi-media performance for voice, piano, electronics and projections shown at Bexiga's underground 70-seat cinema space Teatro HAU in São Paulo, and also the title of Tetine's first album. Alexandre's Grave was released on his own record label, High School Records. It marks the beginning of a series of works that Verner and Mejorado would later perform or exhibit as Tetine.

Verner produced and released electronic music, post punk and funk carioca albums on several record labels including Soul Jazz Records, Mr Bongo, Kute Bash, Bizarre Music, Collete, and Mais Um Discos. He also starred in several of Tetine’s videos directed by his partner Eliete Mejorado. With Tetine, he put out video compilations, curated exhibitions such as Tropical Punk, COMA, and organised music and film programmes such as The Politics Of Self Indulgence. In 1997, Verner wrote the original score for the dance piece Creme by choreographer Adriana Banana of Ur=Hor and formerly of Companhia de Dança Burra.

Also in 1997, Verner, Eliete Mejorado and Ricardo Muniz Fernandes created a project called BABEL, curating the entire programme of the now legendary intervention festival that took place in an abandoned petrol station in Pinheiros, São Paulo, owned by SESC SP. BABEL brought to São Paulo a series of radical performances and works by artists such as Orlan, Karen Finley, Lindy Annis, Teatro Oficina, Laura De Vison, Kazuo Ono, Cabelo, Marta Neves, Fernando Cardoso, Carlinhos, Claudio Cretti, Adriana Galinare, and Individual Industry amongst many other artists. BABEL had a daily programme of performances, concerts and exhibitions Monday to Sunday for two weeks, and admission to all the programmes was free. It received a considerable amount of Brazilian media attention at the time, in particular from the newspaper Folha De São Paulo.

In 1998, Bruno Verner and Eliete Mejorado presented Eletrobrecht and Musica De Amor at the 12 Festival Videobrasil. Also in 1998, Verner and Mejorado were invited to curate the music segment of Mundao at Sesc Santo Amaro, bringing to Brazil for the first time Diamanda Galas, Marianne Faithfull and John Cale for special performances in São Paulo. Other artists included Cibo Matto and a number of local artists.

== 2000 – 2009 ==
In January 2000, Bruno Verner and Eliete Mejorado became resident artists at Queen Mary University in London, establishing themselves in the UK. At Queen Mary University of London, Bruno gave workshops on performance, music and sound manipulation to students of the Drama and Performance department, and later created Living Room - an autobiographical spoken word piece for electronics presented at the university’s Harold Pinter Theatre. Living Room also took part in East End Collaborations Platform - a collaboration between the Live Art Development Agency and Queen Mary University, showing emerging artists working with Live Art.

In 2000, Bruno Verner was awarded the full scholarship Bolsa Apartes/CAPES from the Brazilian government to complete an MA in Performing Arts at Middlesex University, London. In 2002, he collaborated with French artist Sophie Calle writing and producing the electronic music album Samba De Monalisa - Tetine Vs Sophie Calle. The album was part of Sulphur Records collection Meld - a series of audio pieces produced in collaboration between two artists, released on Robin Rimbauld (Scanner)’s label. Other titles from Meld include DJ Spook, Scanner, and Stephen Vittielo, amongst others. In the same year Verner and Mejorado co-curated a film programme and performance night with late British artist/curator Ian White at Whitechapel Gallery entitled The Politics Of Self Indulgence including films by Taka Limura, Chicks on Speed, Tetine, Marina Abramović, and Chilly Gonzales, and debuting their Samba de Monalisa performance live at Whitechapel.

In 2002, Verner and Mejorado fell in love with a new scene of female MCs of Funk Carioca (Baile Funk) from Rio de Janeiro and began broadcasting a weekly radio show called Slum Dunk on Resonance FM entirely dedicated to the genre, the first time Funk Carioca is played in Europe. After hundreds of radio shows spanning different periods of the genre, including a series of live interviews with DJs, MCs and people involved in the scene, in 2004, Verner and Mejorado compiled the pioneering mixtape Slum Dunk Presents Funk Carioca mixed by Tetine, released on Mr Bongo Records. They also released an original blend of queer funk carioca in an album entitled Bonde Do Tetao on Bizarre Music in São Paulo. Slum Dunk Presents Funk Carioca was critically acclaimed in Europe and the United States and influenced a new generation of DJs and producers, including M.I.A and Diplo - who were then beginning to experiment with Funk Carioca more or less at the same time. Tetine's Slum Dunk radio show was responsible for bringing Funk Carioca – the intense lo-down Miami-bass driven sound from Rio’s favela parties – within London’s cultural radar, giving exposure to a number of Baile Funk artists for the first time in Europe, introducing the British and Americans to a new genre, as well as playing Brazil’s most experimental segments of funk including the proibidoes.

The Slum Dunk show covered music genres from obscure electronica to post punk, funk carioca to avant hip hop, experimental mpb to film music and beyond – through hundreds of thematic or free-form radio shows including live performances, interviews with MCs, producers, artists, curators, journalists, beat and party politics conversations, screenings and more. Verner and Mejorado were also responsible for the London premiere of Eu Sou Feia Mas To Na Moda ("I'm Ugly But Trendy") - a film by Denise Garcia on the Funk Carioca scene, later also exhibited in Tetine’s show Tropical Punk.

In 2005, Verner compiled the album The Sexual Life of the Savages - underground post punk from São Paulo for British label Soul Jazz Records. Bruno Verner selected the artists, wrote the sleeve notes and created the album concept. A year later, Verner released A Historia Da Garça - a 12’ on Soul Jazz Records, and the EP L.I.C.K MY FAVELA on the label Kute Bash.

In 2007, Verner and Mejorado conceived Tropical Punk - a Brazilian post-tropical intervention/ exhibition that took place at the Whitehapel Gallery with a programme of films, artist videos, fanzines, tee shirts and performances.

In 2008, Soul Jazz Records released Tetine’s I Go To The Doctor as a 12’, and their full album Let YouR X’s Be Y’s.

By 2009, Verner had returned to São Paulo for a series of shows, talks, exhibitions and workshops on Tetine’s project Samba de Monalisa. Tetine was invited to perform the original audio of Samba de Monalisa at Sophie Calle’s exhibition Take Care of Yourself as part of Videobrasil alongside talks on this project and the workshop "Mixing It - Conhecendo Linguagens". In the same year, Tetine showed their Samba de Monalisa at the Bordeaux Biennale in France. Verner also took part in the videos for Tropical Punk and Shiva with Eliete Mejorado, Guilherme Altamyer, and Tiago Borges, filmed at Aldeia do Meco, Portugal, in 2009.

== 2010 – 2014 ==
In 2010, Verner and Mejorado released From A Forest Near You (Slum Dunk Music) and Tropical Punk on CD and vinyl through their own label Slum Dunk Music.

In 2013, Tetine released In Loveland With You produced by Bruno Verner. The videos for Burning Land and Loveland were also filmed in London.

Later in the year, Verner, Mejorado, poet Ricardo Domeneck and German singer-songwriter Cunt Cunt Chanel went on a mini tour in Belgium curated by Hugo Lorenzetti.

== Discography ==
- Film Tapes (1991-1995) / Slum Dunk Music 2018
- Colt 45 - Underground Post Punk, Tropical Tapes, Lo-Fi Electronics And Other Sounds From Brazil (1983-1993) / Slum Dunk Music 2018
- Queer & Mutant Funk Cuts (2000-2005) / Slum Dunk Music 2016
- 53 Diamonds / Wet Dance 2016
- Mother Nature / Wet Dance 2013
- Black Semiotics / Wet Dance 2013
- In Loveland With You / Slum Dunk Music 2013
- Voodoo Dance & Other Stories / Slum Dunk Music 2011
- Uncorrupted Tropical Wave 1984-2011 / Slum Dunk Music 2011
- From A Forest Near You / Slum Dunk Music 2010
- Let Your X's Be Y's / Soul Jazz Records 2008
- I Go To The Doctor 12" / Soul Jazz Records 2008
- A Historia da Garça 12" / Soul Jazz Records 2006
- L.I.C.K. MY FAVELA / Kute Bash Records 2006
- L.I.C.K MY FAVELA / Slum Dunk 2005
- The Sexual Life of the Savages / Soul Jazz Records 2005
- Bonde do Tetão / Bizarre Music 2004
- Slum Dunk Presents Funk Carioca / Mr Bongo 2004
- Men In Uniform / Bizarre Music 2003
- Tetine Vs Sophie Calle - Samba de Monalisa / Sulphur Records 2002
- Olha Ela de Novo / High School Records 2001
- Música De Amor / High School Records 1998
- Creme / High School Records 1997
- Alexander's Grave / High School Records 1996

=== Compilations - Tracks Appear On ===
- Daora - Underground Sounds of Urban Brasil - Hip-hop, Beats, Afro and Dub - "Burning Land" Mais Um Discos 2013
- Uncorrupted Tropical Wave 1984-2011 - "Shiva, Lick My Favela", Slum Dunk Music, 2011
- Colette Vile - Tropical Punk (Mutant Edit) Colette, 2010
- Soul Jazz Singles 2008-2009 - I Go To The Doctor Soul Jazz Records 2009
- Spex CD, Comp I Go To The Doctor Spex Magazine 2008
- Trax Sampler 116 I Go To The Doctor (CSS remix) Trax Sampler 2008
- Soul Jazz Singles 2006-2007 (2xCD + CD) A Historia Da Garca, Slum Dunk Soul Jazz Records 2007
- Exploited Presents: Shir Khan - Maximize! (2xCD, Comp, Mixed) L.I.C.K. My Favela Exploited 2007
- Mind The Gap Volume 65 (CD, Comp) Zero Zero Five Five (Se Vende) Gonzo Circus 2006
- Gentle Electric (CD) Men In Uniform Mogul Electro 2005
- Essence - Tribute To New Order (CD) Truth The The Records 1997

=== Books & Publications ===
- Born Never Asked: For A Peripheral Underground Tropical Mutant Punk Funk Theory - Counterfield Magazine, 2020.
- 40 Degrees in Black chapter in the Post Punk Then and Now book (Repeater, 2016, London, UK)
- Tetine - Red Book (High School 1998)
- O Um (Atelier Editorial, 1997)

=== Early Sounds (cassette tapes) ===
- O Grito Mudo - O Grito Mudo (1985/1987/1988)
- R.Mutt - R. Mutt (1986)
- Ida & Os Voltas - Jovens Raptados (1986)
- Divergencia Socialista - Lilith Lunaire (1990)
- O Grito Mudo - Mulata Urbana (1987)
- Um Ou Nao - (1992)
- Tetine - Simetrias de A a Z tape (1995)
