= Eliete Mejorado =

Brazilian musician and performance artist

Eliete Mejorado (born 1967 in São Paulo, Brazil) is a Brazilian performance artist, musician, filmmaker and video director, best known for her work as the vocalist and keyboard player of tropical punk duo Tetine which she formed with poet and musician Bruno Verner in São Paulo in 1995.

== Early 1980s ==
Eliete Mejorado started her career in the early 1980s as a performance artist, videomaker and actress in São Paulo working with Luis Otavio Burnier and late choreographer Johnatas Gama. Later in the decade, she produced a number of experimental video works and solo performances that often involved music, dance, screaming vocals, miming, moustaches, wigs, physical theatre and drag. Some of her early work was performed solo or in groups in venues such as Sesc Pompeia and at legendary São Paulo post-punk underground club Madame Sata.

From 1988-1992 Mejorado also studied Performing Arts at UNICAMP.

== 1990–2000 ==
In 1994 Eliete Mejorado was rehearsing for a performance at Teatro Oficina when she met Bruno Verner for the first time. Eliete and Bruno soon found themselves creating a radical blend of atonalism, industrial, punk and noise improvising with a drum machine, an old piano and altered voices. These interludes would often happen during Roberto Zucco's rehearsal breaks. Both artists approach to performance, sound, voice, text and physicality were similar, resulting in the creation of a one-off art project that they later would baptize as Tetine.

In 1995 Tetine was officially born with the debut piece Alexandre's Grave - a multi-media performance for voice, piano, electronics and projections shown at an old 70-seat auditorium called Teatro HAU at Bexiga in São Paulo.

Alexandre’s Grave marked the first of a series of works Bruno Verner and Eliete Mejorado would perform or exhibit as Tetine.

In 1995 her first album with Tetine, Alexandre’s Grave was released on High School Records.

In 1997 Eliete Mejorado and Bruno Verner wrote the original soundtrack for the dance piece CREME by Adriana Banana, ex Cia de Dança Burra. On Creme, Eliete sings, play keyboards and produced a number of tracks for the score.

In 1997 Eliete Mejorado, Bruno Verner and Ricardo Muniz Fernandes create a project called BABEL - curating the entire programme of the now legendary performance festival that took place in an abandoned petrol station in the borough of Pinheiros in São Paulo owned by SESC.

BABEL brought to São Paulo a series of performances and art works by international and local artists such as Orlan, Karen Finley, Lindy Annis, Teatro Oficina, Tetine, Laura Di Vison, Kazuo Ohno, Gerald Thomas, Cabelo, PUS, Marta Neves, Fernando Cardoso, Carlinhos, Claudio Cretti, Adriana Galinare amongst others. During 15 days the festival occupied a deactivated petrol station in the borough of Pinheiros with unconventional exhibition spaces, an experimental theatre, a small cinema, a stage for bands and an open air catwalk for fashion shows. BABEL was free and received Brazilian media attention and public visitation during its two weeks of life.

In 1998 Eliete Mejorado is invited to curate the music segment of MUNDAO at SESC SANTO AMARO bringing for the first time to Brazil, Diamanda Galás, Marianne Faithfull and John Cale for special performances in São Paulo. Other artists include Cibo Matto and a number of local artists.

== 2000–2014 ==
In January 2000, Eliete Mejorado and Bruno Verner become resident artist at Queen Mary University of London, establishing themselves in the UK. At Queen Mary, University of London, Eliete Mejorado gave workshops on performance, music & sound manipulation to students of the Drama & Performance department and later created "Living Room" - an autobiographical spoken word piece for electronics presented at the university’s Harold Pinter Theatre. "Living Room" also took part of East End Collaborations Platform - a collaboration between the Live Art Development Agency and Queen Mary University showing emerging artists working with Live Art.

In 2002 Eliete Mejorado was awarded the full scholarship Bolsa Virtuose from Brazilian government to complete a Masters in Performance at Brighton University, UK.

In 2002 she collaborates with French artist Sophie Calle recording, producing and performing in the acclaimed electronic music album Samba De Monalisa - Tetine Vs Sophie Calle. The record was part of the collection Meld - a series of audio works and collaborations between artists released on Robin Rimbauld (Scanner)’s label Sulpher Records. Other titles from Meld include DJ Spook, Scanner, Stephen Vittielo. At the same year Eliete Mejorado and Bruno Verner co-curate a film programme, slide projection and performance night with Ian White at Whitechapel Gallery entitled The Politics of Self Indulgence including films by Taka Limura, Chicks on Speed, Tetine, Marina Abramović, Chilly Gonzales and debuting their Samba de Monalisa performance live at Whitechapel Gallery.

In 2002 Eliete Mejorado and Bruno Verner fell in love with a new scene of female MCs of funk carioca (Baile Funk) from Rio de Janeiro and began broadcasting a weekly radio show called Slum Dunk on Resonance FM, 104.4 entirely dedicated to the genre. That's the first time funk carioca is played in Europe. After hundreds of radio shows spanning different periods of the genre, including a series of live interviews with Djs, MCs and people involved in the scene, in 2004, Bruno Verner & Eliete Mejorado compiled the pioneering mixtape Slum Dunk Presents Funk Carioca mixed by Tetine, released on Mr Bongo Records. At the same year they released an original blend of queer funk carioca in an album entitled Bonde Do Tetao on Bizarre Records in São Paulo. Critically acclaimed in Europe and in the USA, Slum Dunk Presents Funk Carioca influenced an entire new generation of DJs and producers including M.I.A and Diplo - artists who were beginning to experiment with funk carioca at more or less the same time. Tetine's Slum Dunk radio show was responsible to bring Funk Carioca – the intense lo-down Miami-bass driven sound from Rio’s favela parties – within London’s cultural radar, giving exposure to a number of Baile Funk artists for the first time in Europe, introducing the British and Americans to a new genre, as well as playing Brazil’s most experimental segments of funk carioca culture including the proibidoes.

The Slum Dunk show also covered from obscure electronica to post punk, funk carioca to avant hip hop, experimental mpb to film music and beyond – through hundreds of thematic or free-form radio shows including live performances, interviews with MCs, producers, artists, curators, journalists, beat & party politics conversations, screenings and more. Eliete Mejorado was also responsible for the London premiere of I'm Ugly But Trendy - a film by Denise Garcia on the funk carioca scene, later also exhibited in Tetine’s show Tropical Punk at Whitechapel Gallery. In 2006 Eliete Mejorado and Bruno Verner put out 'A Historia Da Garça - a 12’ release on Soul Jazz Records and the EP L.I.C.K MY FAVELA on Berlin's label Kute Bash.

In 2007 Eliete Mejorado and Bruno Verner exhibit "Tropical Punk" - a Brazilian tropical intervention that took place at the Whitehapel Gallery with a programme of films, artist videos, fanzines, T. shirts and performances. In 2008 Soul Jazz Records releases Tetine's I Go To The Doctor as 12-inch - a collaboration with MC Deise Tigrona (previously released on Slum Dunk Music & Kute Bash in 2005, 2006 respectively) following Tetine’s acclaimed full album Let Your X’s Be Y’s.

In an interview for XRL8R Cameron Macdonald refers to Eliete with the following quote "vocalist and multi-instrumentalist Eliete Mejorado often takes the stage in the scant garb of a Carnaval dancer, and leads the audience through sexually charged, politically provocative songs like the Tone Loc-sampling hip-hop number “L.I.C.K. My Favela.” “It’s fun and political at the same time,” Mejorado says of the band's ethos. “The world is an ultra-technological place and super-sexualized, but people don’t really know what to do with their bodies.”

In 2009 Eliete Mehorado is back in São Paulo for a series of shows, talks, exhibitions and workshops on Tetine’s project Samba de Monalisa. Tetine are invited to perform "Samba de Monalisa" at Sophie Calle's exhibition Take Care of Yourself as part of Videobrasil. At the same year Samba de Monalisa is also presented at the Bourdeaux Bienalle in France.

In 2010 Eliete Mejorado and Bruno Verner release independently From A Forest Near You (Slum Dunk Music) and the 12' EP Tropical Punk including Yr Daughter Lies, a collaboration with LA duo Howardamb.

In 2013 Tetine releases In Loveland With You produced by Bruno Verner. The first two videos for Burning Land and Loveland are filmed in London and directed by Eliete Mejorado. Later in the year Bruno Verner, Eliete Mejorado, poet Ricardo Domeneck and German singer-songwriter Cunt Cunt Chanel go on a mini tour in Belgium organised by Hugo Lorenzetti.

In 2014 Eliete Mejorado directs a new video piece entitled Shake.

== Albums (with Tetine) ==
- Queer & Mutant Funk Cuts (2000–2005) / Slum Dunk 2016
- 53 Diamonds / Wet Dance 2016
- Mother Nature / Wet Dance 2013
- Black Semiotics / Wet Dance 2013
- In Loveland With You / Slum Dunk Music 2013
- Voodoo Dance & Other Stories / Slum Dunk Music 2011
- Uncorrupted Tropical Wave 1984–2011 / Slum Dunk Music 2011
- From A Forest Near You / Slum Dunk Music 2010
- Let Your X's Be Y's / Soul Jazz Records 2008
- I Go To The Doctor 12 / Soul Jazz Records 2008
- A Historia da Garça 12 / Soul Jazz Records 2006
- L.I.C.K. MY FAVELA / Kute Bash Records 2006
- L.I.C.K MY FAVELA / Slum Dunk 2005
- The Sexual Life of the Savages / Soul Jazz Records 2005
- Bonde do Tetão / Bizarre Music 2004
- Slum Dunk Presents Funk Carioca / Mr Bongo 2004
- Men In Uniform / Bizarre Music 2003
- Tetine Vs Sophie Calle - Samba de Monalisa / Sulphur Records 2002
- Olha Ela de Novo / High School Records 2001
- Música De Amor / High School Records 1998
- Creme / High School Records 1997
- Alexander's Grave / High School Records 1996
