= Lina Bo Bardi =

Italo-Brazilian architect (1914–1992)

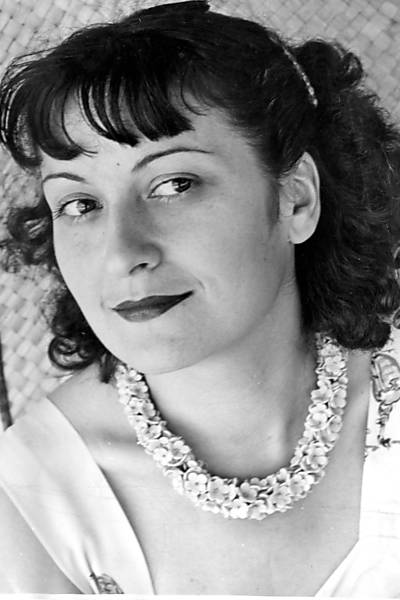
- Born: Achillina Bo; 5 December 1914; Rome, Italy
- Died: 20 March 1992 (aged 77); Casa de Vidro, São Paulo, Brazil
- Occupation: Architect
- Spouse: Pietro Maria Bardi
- Buildings: São Paulo Museum of Art; Teatro Oficina; Casa do Benin; Sesc Pompeia; Casa de Vidro

Lina Bo Bardi, born Achillina Bo (5 December 1914 – 20 March 1992), was an Italian-born Brazilian modernist architect. A prolific architect and designer, she devoted her working life, most of it spent in Brazil, to promoting the social and cultural potential of architecture and design. While she studied under radical Italian architects, she quickly became intrigued with Brazilian vernacular design and how it could influence a modern Brazilian architecture. During her lifetime it was difficult to be accepted among the local Brazilian architects, because she was both a "foreigner" and a woman.

She is recognizable for the unique style of the many architectural illustrations she created over her lifetime, along with her tendency to leave poignant notes to herself. She is also known for her furniture and jewelry designs. The popularity of her works has increased since 2008, when a 1993 catalog of her works was republished. A number of her product designs are being revived, and exhibitions such as her 1968 exhibition of glass and concrete easels have been recreated.

== Early life in Italy ==
Achillina Bo was born on 5 December 1914 in Rome, Italy. Lina was the oldest child of Enrico and Giovanna Bo, who later had another daughter named Graziella. Lina had an appreciation for art from a young age. When she decided on becoming an architect, her father was not in total support of her decision. In 1939, she graduated from the Rome College of Architecture at the age of 25 with her final piece, "The Maternity and Infancy Care Centre". She then moved to Milan to begin working with architect Carlo Pagani in the Studio Bo e Pagani, No 12, Via Gesù. Bo Bardi collaborated (until 1943) with architect and designer Giò Ponti on the magazine Lo Stile – nella casa e nell’arredamento. In 1942, at the age of 28, she opened her own architectural studio on Via Gesù, but the lack of work during wartime soon led Bardi to take up illustration for newspapers and magazines such as Stile, Grazia, Belleza, Tempo, Vetrina and Illustrazione Italiana. Her office was destroyed by an aerial bombing in 1943. From 1944–5 Bardi was the Deputy Director of Domus magazine.

The event prompted her deeper involvement in the Italian Communist Party. In 1945, Domus commissioned Bo Bardi to travel around Italy with Carlo Pagani and photographer Federico Patellani to document and evaluate the situation of the destroyed country. Bo Bardi, Pagani and Bruno Zevi established the weekly magazine A – Attualità, Architettura, Abitazione, Arte in Milan (A Cultura della Vita). She also collaborated on the daily newspaper Milano Sera, directed by Elio Vittorini. Bo Bardi took part in the First National Meeting for Reconstruction in Milan, alerting people to the indifference of public opinion on the subject, which for her covered both the physical and moral reconstruction of the country.

In 1946, Bo Bardi moved to Rome and married the art critic and journalist Pietro Maria Bardi.

== Career in Brazil ==
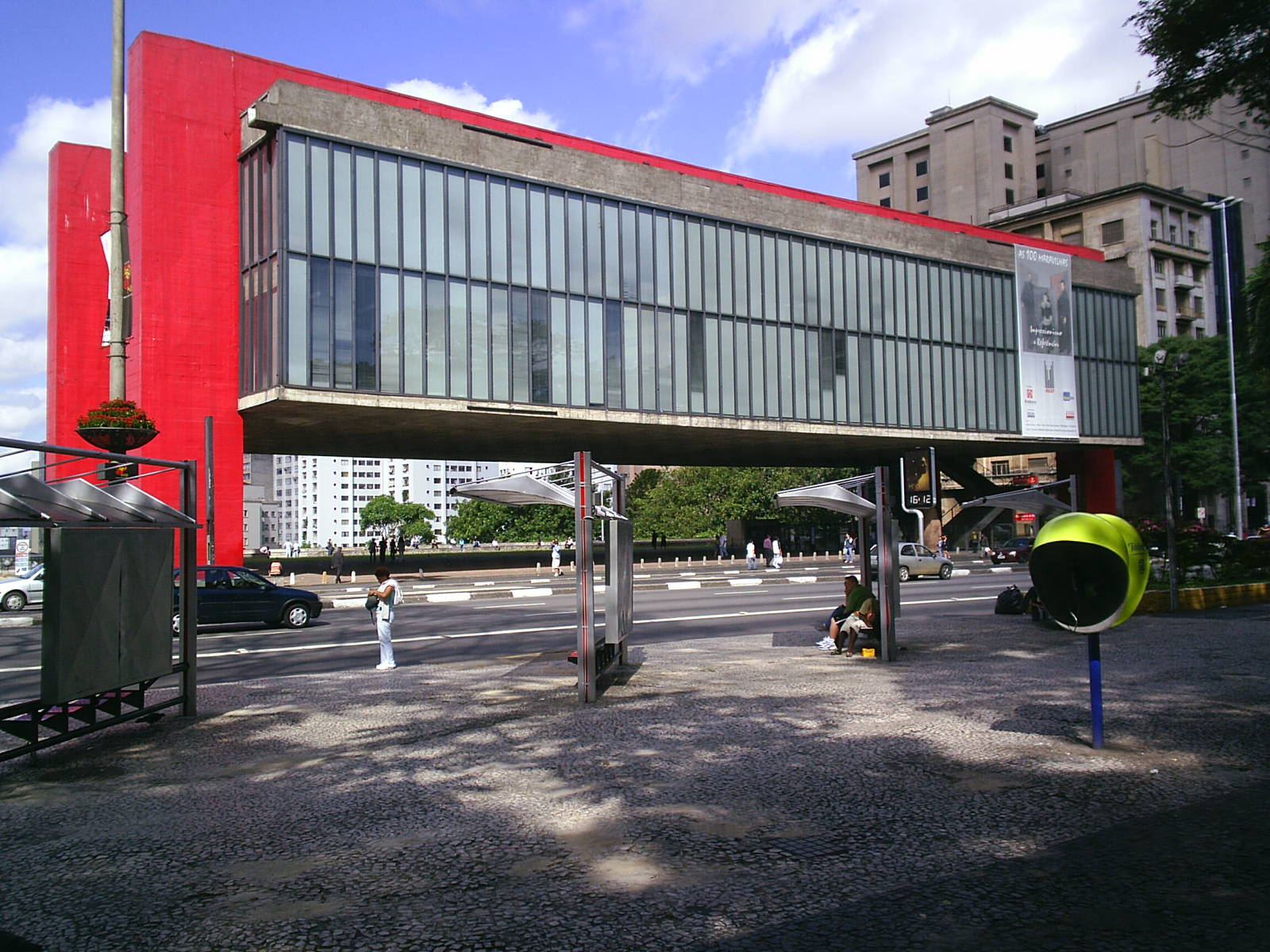
The São Paulo Museum of Art (MASP), a well-known work of Lina Bo Bardi

In October 1946 Bo Bardi and her husband traveled to South America. Because they had participated in the Italian resistance movement, they had found life in post-war Italy difficult. In Rio, they were received by the IAB (Institute of Brazilian Architects). Bardi quickly re-established her practice in Brazil, a country which had a profound effect on her creative thinking. She and her husband co-founded the influential art magazine Habitat. The magazine's title referenced Bardi's conceptualization of the ideal interior as a "habitat" designed to maximize human potential.

In 1947, Assis Chateaubriand invited Pietro Maria Bardi to establish and run a Museum of Art. São Paulo was chosen as the location despite Bo Bardi's preference for Rio de Janeiro. MASP (the São Paulo Museum of Art) was established on 2 October, with temporary offices on the second floor of the headquarters of the Diários Associados on Rua Sete de Abril. Working with Pietro Maria Bardi, Bo Bardi designed the conversion of several floors of the building into a museum; early sketches evoke the facade of the 1939 MoMA building by Philip L. Goodwin and Edward Durell Stone, but alterations were ultimately limited to the interior. She also designed the new headquarters for the Diários Associados on Rua Álvaro de Carvalho, São Paulo, and designed jewelry using Brazilian gemstones. In addition, soon after arriving in Brazil, Bardi began designing their home in Morumbi, a part of the virgin forest in the southern part of São Paulo.

In 1948, the Studio d’Arte Palma was established on the 18th floor of a building by Polish architect Lucjan Korngold (N˚ 66 Praça Bráulio Gomes, São Paulo), bringing Pietro Maria Bardi, Bo Bardi, Giancarlo Palanti (until 1951) and Valeria Piacentini Cirell (responsible for the antiquarian section) together.

In 1950, Bo Bardi and fellow Italian immigrant Giancarlo Palanti re-designed the MASP museum space in the Diários Associados building, shifting away from Beaux-Arts-style interiors with paintings backed by curtained walls, towards exhibition design rooted in interwar avant-garde artistic practices such as the work of El Lissitzky, the Deutscher Werkbund, and Franco Albini.

Bo Bardi became a naturalized Brazilian citizen in 1951, the same year she completed her first built work, her own "Glass House" in the new neighborhood of Morumbi. Italian rationalism shaped this first work, but because she was immersed in Brazilian culture, her creative thinking began to become more expressive.

In 1955 Bo Bardi became a lecturer for the Architecture and Urbanism Faculty at the University of São Paulo. She wrote and submitted the manuscript, "Contribuição Propedêutica ao Ensino da Teoria da Arquitetura" (Propaedeutic Contribution to the Teaching of Architecture Theory) to the school in 1957, hoping to win a permanent position there.

In 1959, Bo Bardi collaborated with theater director Martim Gonçalves to create the exhibition Bahia in Ibirapuera, which exhibited artworks, craft objects, music, and images from the Brazilian state of Bahia in the heart of the V São Paulo Bienal. This exhibition was a crucial transitional design between the museology of the earlier MASP in the Diários Associados building and the crystal easels of the later MASP on Avenida Pompéia.

In 1977 Bo Bardi designed the SESC Pompéia Factory, which was called a "leisure center" instead of a sports and cultural center by Bo Bardi because she felt that the word culture was too weighty, and this place should be somewhere to relax and find enjoyment. The design of SESC Pompéia prioritized labor and craftmanship over expensive materials because Bo Bardi believed architects should do their best to create jobs for craftsmen and laborers.

In 1989, at the age of 74, Bo Bardi was honored with the first exhibition of her work at the University of São Paulo.

Bo Bardi also created jewelry, costume, and set designs.

Bo Bardi died at the Casa de Vidro on 20 March 1992. When she died she left designs for a new São Paulo City Hall and a Cultural Centre for Vera Cruz.

== Early Projects ==
In August 1940 Bo Bardi partnered with Carlo Pagani in an unbuilt project titled 'Casa sul mare di Sicilia' in a special issue of the magazine Domus. It is one of the first projects that Bo Bardi worked on – a utopian project whose representations indicate a way of proceedings that coagulates theory and imagination conceived as indissoluble relationship of 'doing'." In addition the project had "'unconventional' drawings of the project, plans, perspectives and perspective section, indicating a very personal way in using of graphic language". The project was a design for a Mediterranean house integrated into the landscape and built using an abundance of historical and cultural imaginary.

Bo Bardi's very particular representational style likely originated through an artistic style inspired from her father Enricao Bo, who was in many trades but was an anarchist with an adventurous life which influenced many of the unique graphical drawings of her 'Casa sul mare di Sicilia'.

== Major Projects ==
=== The Glass House ===
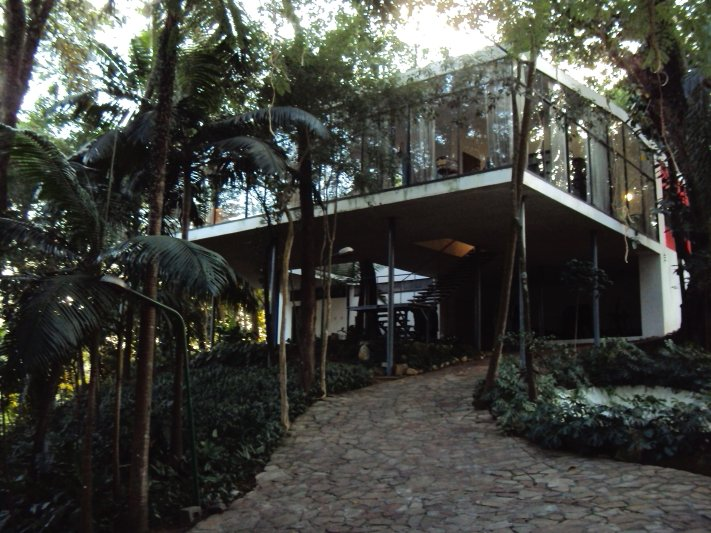
Casa de Vidro (Glass House)

In 1951 Bo Bardi designed the "Casa de Vidro" (“Glass House”) to live with her husband in what was then the remnants of the Mata Atlantica, the original rain forest surrounding São Paulo. She appreciated the site's rugged landscape, which aligned with many of her written works praising rural architecture. The structure is an early example of reinforced concrete in domestic architecture. Located on a 7,000-square-metre plot of land, it was one of the first three residences in the Morumbi neighborhood, along with Oswaldo Bratke's studio house and his project for Oscar and Maria Luisa Americano. The area is now a wealthy suburb; a more domesticated version of the rain forest has re-established itself around the house, concealing it from view.

In addition to being her first built project, this building was also Bo Bardi's first attempt at finding a Brazilian language for the Italian modernism that she had been trained in. She also drew from other American modernist works, such as Mies van der Rohe's Farnsworth House and Case Study House No. 8 by Charles and Ray Eames, both of which were widely publicized at the time. It also could have been influenced by Bernard Rudofsky's courtyard houses featured in the Brazil Builds exposition (1940–1942). However, she wanted to contextualize this modernism into the fabric of Brazil. Rather than copying the local forms, she hoped to incorporate the ideas behind them into the design in a way that was modern, and she celebrated the local environment.

The main part of the house is horizontal between thin reinforced concrete slabs with slender circular columns. The columns are pilotis, which allows the landscape to flow under the building. Large panels of glass combined with a sense of the structure hovering over the ground contributed to the "Glass House" name. Inside, the main living area is almost completely open, except for a courtyard that allows the trees in the garden below to grow up into the heart of the house. In the house, there are zones allocated to different functions- a dining room, a library, and a sitting area around the freestanding fireplace- but all are unified by the forest views through the glass. In theory, the glass panels slide open horizontally, but there is no balcony to encourage people to go outside.

The living area is only half of the house. The other half sits on solid ground at the top of the hill, on the north side of the living room. A row of bedrooms face a narrow courtyard, on the other side of which is the blank wall of the staff wing. Only the kitchen crosses the divide – a territory shared by servants and mistress, and equipped with a variety of well-designed labor-saving devices.

The house would become a model for the developer's campaign to sell the remaining lots in the Morumbi. The slogan of "Architecture and Nature" echoed the major themes of Bo Bardi's work.

Related pages: Architectural Drawings, Travel Notebook, Harvard Design Magazine: After the Flood

=== The São Paulo Museum of Art ===
Bo Bardi's basic design was used for the São Paulo Museum of Art (also known as "MASP") which was built between 1957 and 1968. Her husband, Pietro Maria Bardi, was curator. The Bardis became involved with the Museum after meeting the Brazilian journalist and diplomat Assis Chateaubriand. Chateaubriand, with P.M. Bardi's curatorial insight, acquired a vast collection of art for MASP, including art works by Bosch, Mantegna, Titian and Goya.

In what she coins "Poor Architecture", one divorced from the pretentiousness often associated with cultured intellectuals, Bo Bardi sought to design a museum that embodied a simple form of monumental architecture. Formed from pre-stressed concrete without embellishment, the building is formed from raw and efficient solutions. The building features a suspended volume, spanning 74 meters, held aloft by 4 brilliant red, concrete columns connected by two concrete beam running along the length of the building, with 2 floors of gallery above and below the ground floor. The open midsection of the building left the plaza open to Avenida Paulista, São Paulo's main financial and cultural avenue, and left the site unobstructed to the views of the lower-lying parts of the city, which was one of the conditions given by the local legislation when Bo Bardi received the commission for this project

Paintings were hung on individual sheets of glass set in rough-hewn concrete blocks – called "crystal easels" – and arranged in a rough grid in the MASP Pinacoteca. Bo Bardi intended to create an experience within the art gallery that would be unexpected and almost uncomfortable, by presenting the artwork in a non-chronological order in the open plan of each floor to create dissonance between the preconceived understanding of order and what is presented.

=== Solar do Unhão ===
Solar do Unhão is Salvador's main cultural center. It was founded by Lina Bo Bardi after an invitation by the governor of Bahia to direct a new art museum in the North East of Brazil. Bo Bardi wanted this museum to show primitive art from the North East of Brazil, as well as the practical nature of their designs. The design of the museum reflects the culture in Salvador, but also the practicality and beauty of the region. Solar do Unhão used to be a sugar mill and was named after the 17th-century Brazilian high court judge, Pedro Unhão Castelo Branco. Bo Bardi was commissioned to restore the sugar mill into a museum of modern art. The construction lasted from 1959–1963. The staircase contrasts abstract geometry and traditional materiality. Bo Bardi is paying homage to the 17th-century building, but at the same time updating it with modern designs. Her goal was to restore extant buildings in ways that neither pandered to nostalgia nor ignored context. To do this, she left the colonial exterior intact and added the modern staircase. Solar do Unhão reflects Bo Bardi's belief that a museum should also be a place for education. When the museum was first built it held many classes that educated the locals in art and history. Bo Bardi believed that a museum should not be a mausoleum of the past and should instead be an active site of knowledge.

=== Centro de Lazer Fábrica da Pompéia ===
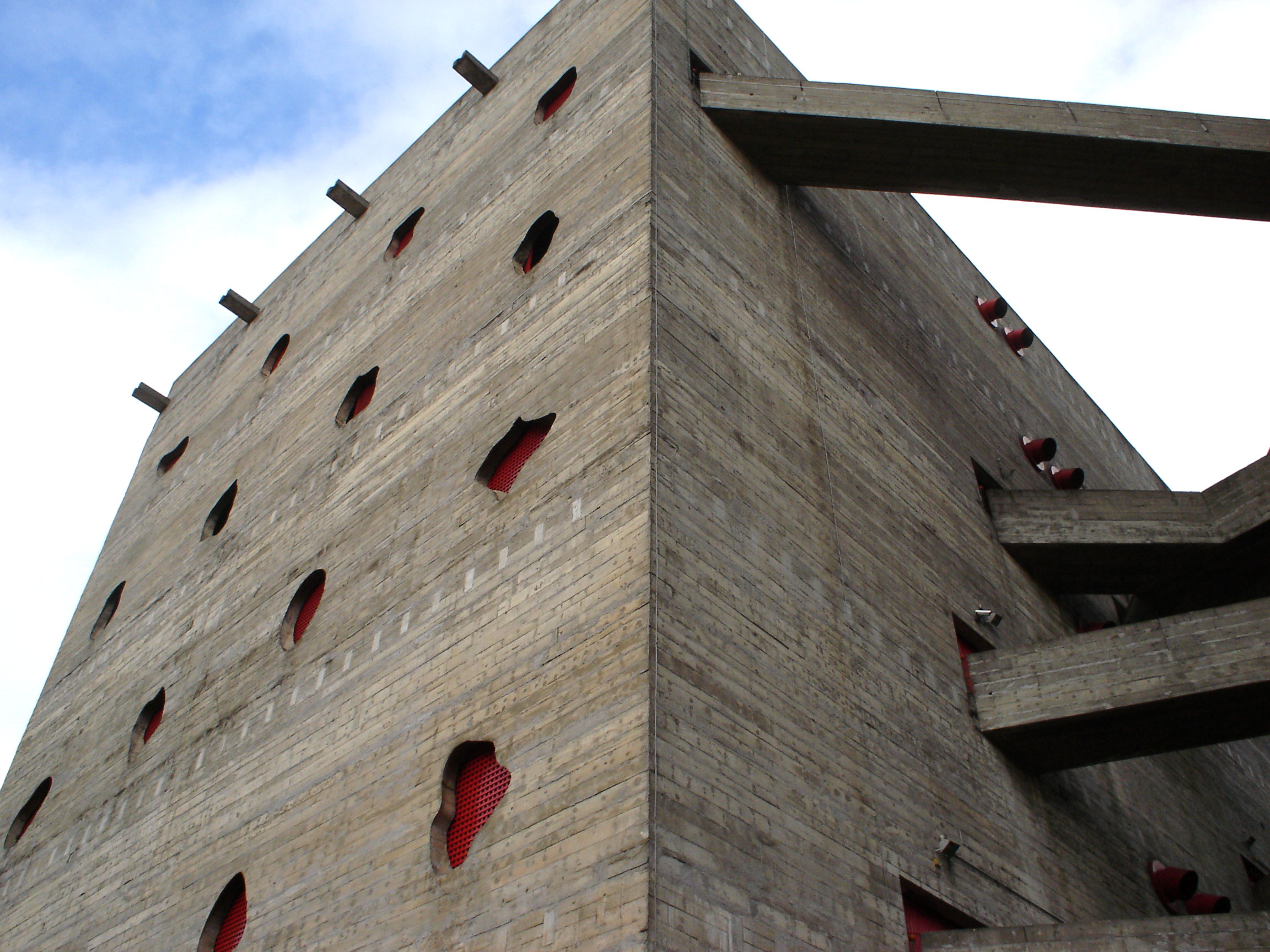
Lina Bo Bardi, SESC Pompeia, 1982

The Centro de Lazer Fábrica da Pompéia (now called the SESC Pompéia) was one of Bo Bardi's largest and most important projects, in addition to being an early example of adaptive reuse. The site was a former steel drum and refrigerator factory in São Paulo, and was to be redeveloped into a leisure and recreation center for the working class. SESC is a Brazilian non-governmental organization linked to national unions, created in the 1940s to provide workers with health services and cultural activities. Completed in several stages between 1977 and 1986, Bo Bardi combined the existing structure with additions of her own design.

After a site visit in the early stages of the project, Bo Bardi realized that locals and former factory workers were already using the existing structure as a social gathering space and a place for football, dance groups, and theater. Rather than interfere with the use of the site, she set out to maintain and amplify those uses. Bo Bardi stripped away old plaster and then sandblasted to reveal the rough concrete of the former factory. Her design added new concrete towers which were connected to the factory building by aerial walkways. Rough windows were knocked out of the factory walls and covered with bright red sliding screens attached inside. When deciding what kind of program should be implemented, Bo Bardi believed that the project should be a leisure center rather than a culture and sporting center. She believed that "culture" is a strong term and may mandate people to hold cultural events, and the term "sporting" may have a harmful tendency towards a culture that is already competitive by nature The building currently houses many activities rooms, including: theatres, gymnasiums, a swimming pool, snack bars, leisure areas, restaurants, galleries, and workshops.

SESC Pompéia was built after a 20-year military dictatorship in Brazil that created architecture that did not mirror the Brazilian culture. SESC Pompéia is thought to be an example of a new architectural language predominately influenced by Brazilian culture.

=== Teatro Oficina ===
The Teatro Oficina was designed by Bo Bardi in 1984. She was commissioned to turn a burnt office building in São Paulo into a theatre. The building was designed for the theatre group with the same name whom were an important part of the Tropicalia movement of the late 1960s. Tropicalia strived for change and a way for Brazil to escape its colonial past. They used theater to try and understand their Brazilian heritage. Bo Bardi designed the new space almost completely out of painted scaffolding. The design references the construction of sets in a theatre space. The theatre does not have conventional seats, which leads to bad sight lines. Architectural critiques have stated that this does not take away from the theatre experience but enhances it with intensity. The heavy wooden seats are designed in a circle at center stage and the stage is very narrow. Initially, the theatre was designed for experimental director, Zé Celso, who has said that the idea of the space came to him in an acid trip. The theatre is often used by experimental performers who work around the space. The design of the theatre is meant to make the viewer feel as though they are engaged with the act on the stage.

== Furniture design ==
In 1948, Bo Bardi founded the Studio de Arte e Arquitetura Palma with Giancarlo Palanti (1906–77) to design economical furniture of pressed wood or plastic manufactured by Pau Brasil Ltda., the fabrication studio they opened, and through which they furnished the São Paulo Museum of Art's first headquarters. In the 1950s, Bardi began designing metal-framed furniture with upholstered seats and backs. Her most famous design is the 1951 upholstered bowl chair on a metal frame. Pianeta Design has written of her design that it received positive reviews in 1951, but only two original prototypes remain of the initial design as it was not initially put into production. In 2012, Italian Furniture brand Arper recreated 500 pieces of the limited edition Bowl Chair. Arper engaged in intensive dialogues with the Institute Lina Bo e P.M. Bardi evaluating the original iterations for size, interior structure, upholstery detailing – down to the quality and size of the stitching – and softness of the seat. Every detail, down to the small leather covers placed around the round steel frame of the chair to hold it in place, was carefully reinterpreted. Arper explored different modes of interpretation of color for this touchstone of Brazilian modernist design.

Later designs, such as her 1967 Cadeira Beira de Estrada (Roadside Chair), inspired by the vernacular designs she observed during her travels in the northeast of Brazil, embody an unofficial aesthetic with simplicity of design and reduction and rawness of material. She often used plywood and native Brazilian woods in her designs. Bardi wanted each object to display its own "natural logic."

== Studio Culture ==
A day working in one of Bo Bardi's multiple studios was anything but typical. After the completion of her Glass House project, Bo Bardi and her four staff members met around the open fireplace in lieu of a dedicated office and collaborated there. In 1977, Bo Bardi moved her studio into a shipping container unit on the grounds of the SESC Pompéia site where it remained for nine years. It was common to see construction tools and hard hats littering her workspace as she was just as interested in the techniques and skills rooted in building as she was the poetics of her designs. Bo Bardi's office never had a secretary to handle administrative duties, nor did they make a habit of producing "standard" technical drawings and plans for construction. Instead, Bo Bardi crafted colorful and expressive drawings using a plethora of pens, paints, watercolors and brushes. She used a unique drafting desk with a glass top and a cast-iron base imported from Italy in her office.

== Drawings ==
Bo Bardi produced more than six thousand drawings most of which are stored in her personal archives in the house she designed for herself and her husband in São Paulo. She used drawing as a primary language for communicating her thoughts and ideas to the rest of the world. Most of her drawings are not isolated events as they correlate and exist in a wide range of scales, patterns, relationships, and themes. As she moved to different practices and places her drawing style adapted to about the world surrounding her. Zeuler R. Lima, Lina Bo Bardi's biographer, dedicated two books and two exhibitions to the study of her drawings (see external links below).

=== Analytical drawings ===
Bo Bardi's drawings continued to have a presences in her education as an architect. She eventually moved away from the colorful representations of her adolescence and switched to a more analytical framework of observing and drafting. She used orange gouache for the pochè, the filled-in section of walls, which suggests her use of bold graphic choices. She took courses that helped her in composition, plein air drawing, perspective, and descriptive geometries all focused on historic buildings. She also studied classical, Renaissance, and manurist writings and treatises by Vitruvius.

=== Narrative drawings ===
After graduating at the outset of war, she used her knowledge of watercolor and gouache, with her architecture education to create drawings that tell stories. She created images illustrating pieces of traditional and modernist modes of representation, between lyricism and rationalism. She often organized these stories into little cartoons, resembling medieval horror vacui composition with little blank spaces between them. She would limit the texture of the drawings while also using a single-point perspective, axonometric and cavalier representations, as well as bird's-eye views. She would display multiple spatial frameworks simultaneously, but never losing sight of the aspects of daily life, which she revealed gracefully, in colorful detail.

== Legacy ==
In 1990, the Instituto Lina Bo Bardi e P.M. Bardi was established to promote the study of Brazilian culture and architecture. Bo Bardi died in 1992 in Sao Paulo, Brazil.

Over the past years, numerous artists and architects including Gilbert & George, Cildo Meireles, Isaac Julien, Cristina Iglesias, Norman Foster, Olafur Eliasson, and Adrián Villar Rojas have created works in homage to Lina Bo Bardi. SANAA architect Kazuyo Sejima put her at the center of her Venice Architecture Biennale in 2009. Her work was the subject of a 2012 exhibition at the British Council in London. In 2013, curator Hans Ulrich Obrist mounted the exhibition “The Insides are on the Outside”, set at the Casa de Vidro and at SESC Pompeia. Gilbert & George spent a day at the Glass House as living sculptures, documenting the results with postcards to be distributed to visitors.

In 2013 the British Council, in collaboration with the Instituto Lina Bo Bardi e P.M. Bardi, created a fellowship called the Lina Bo Bardi Fellowship for UK architects to travel and work in Brazil.

In 2014, a Google Doodle commemorated her 100th birthday.

In 2015, The Guardian elected Lina Bo Bardi's Teatro Oficina (1991) as the best theatre in the world.

In 2018, Nilufar Gallery, in collaboration with Space Caviar, supported by Instituto Bardi Casa de Vidro, presented the largest collection of Lina’s furniture ever brought together, at Fuorisalone Milan Design Week.

From 5 October 2018 – 13 January 2019, the Fundación Juan March Madrid exhibited Lina Bo Bardi. Tupí or not tupí. Brazil (1946–1992). It was the first exhibit of her work in Spain.

Lina Bo Bardi was portrayed by Fernanda Montenegro and Fernanda Torres in the 2020 Isaac Julien's documentary film Lina Bo Bardi – A Marvelous Entanglement.

In 2021, La Biennale di Venezia posthumously awarded Bo Bardi a Special Golden Lion for Lifetime Achievement during the 17th International Architecture Exhibition. The award announcement emphasized the civic dimension of her practice and her view of architecture as a collective service, citing the São Paulo Museum of Art, Sesc Pompeia, Casa de Vidro, and Teatro Oficina among the projects that demonstrated this approach.

== Publications ==
- Bardi, Lina Bo; Rubino, Silvana; Grinover, Marina (2009). Lina por escrito: textos escolhidos de Lina Bo Bardi, 1943–1991. Coleção Face norte. São Paulo: Cosac Naify. ISBN 978-85-7503-764-5. OCLC 451088173.
- Bardi, Lina Bo (2017). Steele, Brett (ed.). Stones against Diamonds. Translated by Doyle, Anthony; Johnston, Pamela (Reprinted ed.). London: Architectural Association Publications. ISBN 978-1-907896-20-0.
- Carboncini, Anna; Zeuler, R. M. De A. (2018). Yashar, N. (ed.). Lina Bo Bardi. Giancarlo Palanti. Studio D'Arte Palma 1948–1951. Lima: Nīlūfar. ISBN 978-8899748142.
- Lina Bo Bardi – The Poetry of Concrete. Catalogue of the exhibition at the Tchoban Foundation. Museum for Architectural Drawing, Berlin

== Selected architectural projects ==
- Casa de Vidro (The Glass House), 1951: Bo Bardi's residence
- Bardi's Bowl, 1951: Chair
- Solar do Unhão, 1959: sugar mill converted to a craft museum in Bahia
- Museu de Arte de São Paulo (São Paulo Museum of Art), 1968
- Caipiras, Capiaus: Pau a Pique (Exhibition), 1984
- Centro de Lazer Fábrica da Pompéia (Pompéia Factory Leisure Centre), 1986
- Teatro Oficina, 1991: variable space composed of reused materials that dissolved the distinctions between actor and audience, stage and backstage

== See also ==
- Oscar Niemeyer
- Lúcio Costa
