= Ron Daniels (director) =

Theatre and opera director (born 1942)

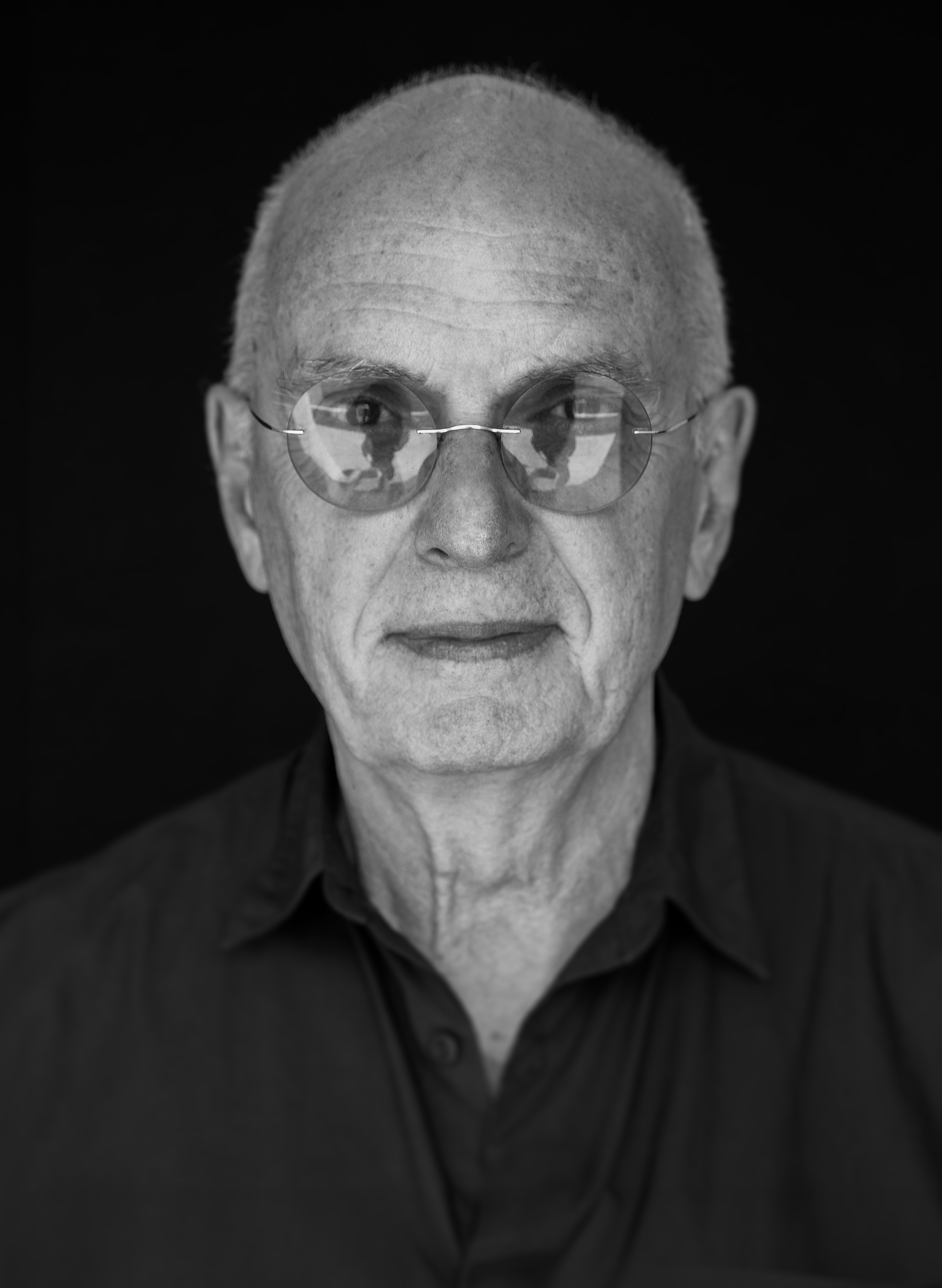
- Born: Ronald George Daniel; 1942 (age 83–84); Niteroi, Rio de Janeiro, Brazil.
- Education: Fundação Brasileira de Teatro, Rio de Janeiro.
- Known for: Theatre, film and opera director
- Notable work: 1982 – The Tempest (starring Derek Jacobi, Mark Rylance), RSC; 1984 – Hamlet (starring Roger Rees, Kenneth Branagh, Frances Barber, Brian Blessed), RSC; 1989 – Hamlet (starring Mark Rylance), RSC; 2010 – Il Postino (starring Plácido Domingo), LA Opera, Theatre an der Wien, in Vienna, the Châtelet in Paris.
- Website: www.rondanielsdirector.com

Ron Daniels (born Ronald George Daniel, 1942) is a theatre and opera director. He is an Honorary Associate Director of the Royal Shakespeare Company; former Artistic Director of The Other Place, Royal Shakespeare Company, Stratford-upon-Avon; former Associate Artistic Director of the American Repertory Theatre (ART), Cambridge, Massachusetts; and former Head of Acting and Directing Programs of the Institute for Advanced Theatre Training at Harvard University. He is also a founding member of the Teatro Oficina, São Paulo, in his native Brazil.

== Early years and acting ==
Daniels was born in Niteroi, Rio de Janeiro, Brazil born 1942. He studied at Fundação Brasileira de Teatro, Rio de Janeiro.

In 1959 Daniels performed in Sangue no Domingo by Walter Hugo Durst, Boca de Ouro by Nelson Rodrigues, directed by Ziembinski.

=== As a founding member of the Teatro Oficina, São Paulo, 1959–1963 ===
A Incubadeira; Fogo Frio; Todo Anjo é Terrível Look Homeward, Angel with Henriette Morineau, directed by José Celso Martinez Correa; A Vida Impressa em Dolar Awake and Sing; José do Parto à Sepultura by Augusto Boal) Quatro num Quarto; Um Bonde Chamado Desejo A Streetcar Named Desire directed by Augusto Boal); Os Pequenos Burguêses "Les Petits Bourgeois" by Gorki – with Eugenio Kusnet, Raul Cortez, Celia Helena, directed by José Celso Martinez Correa.

In 1964, aged 21, Daniels moved to the UK and joined the Royal Shakespeare Company in 1968, playing Metellus Cimber in John Barton's Julius Caesar and John Grass in Indians by Arthur Kopit, directed by Jack Gelber.

== Directing 1969–1974 ==
In 1969 Daniels became a director and worked for five years directing for the following institutions:

=== 1969–1972 ===
Victoria Theatre, Stoke-on-Trent: The Pot of Gold; Electra; She Stoops to Conquer; Coriolanus; Major Barbara; Fighting Man; Who's Afraid of Virginia Woolf?; Sweeney Todd, the Demon Barber of Fleet Street; Ghosts; Drums in the Night; The Samaritan; Time Travelers; The Recruiting Officer.

=== 1972–1974 ===
Royal Academy of Dramatic Art: Measure for Measure; Fear and Miseries of the Third Reich; The Insect Play; Twelfth Night; A Midsummer Night's Dream; Pillars of the Community.

Drama Centre London: The Word

=== As a freelance director ===
The Long and Short and the Tall; The Samaritan by Peter Terson, with Timothy Dalton; The Children's Crusade by Paul Thompson featuring Daniel Day-Lewis; Female Transport by Steve Gooch; Sergeant Musgrave's Dance by John Arden; Into the Mouth of Crabs; By Common Consent by Paul Thompson; The Motor Show; Made in Britain; Bang by Howard Barker; Ashes by David Rudkin, with Ian McKellen, Gemma Jones; The Beastly Beatitudes of Balthazar B by JP Donleavy, with Simon Callow; Across from the Garden of Allah by Charles Wood, with Nigel Hawthorne and Glenda Jackson; The Feast of Snails by Olaf Olafsson

== Royal Shakespeare Company 1974–1991 ==
In 1974, Daniels returned to the RSC, where he directed 34 productions until he moved to the US in 1991.

=== Productions directed ===
- Afore Night Come (by David Rudkin, with Michael Pennington, Richard Griffiths), The Other Place 1974
- Destiny (by David Edgar with Michael Pennington and Ian McDiarmid), The Other Place 1976, Aldwych Theatre 1977
- T'is Pity She's a Whore, The Other Place 1977, Warehouse, London 1978
- The Lorenzaccio Story (by Paul Thompson, with Peter McEnery), The Other Place 1977, Warehouse 1978
- Winter's Tale (by Rosalind Winter, featuring Alan Rickman, Zoe Wanamaker)
- The Sons of Light (by David Rudkin, with Peter McEnery), The Other Place 1977
- The Women-Pirates Ann Bonney and Mary Read, Aldwych Theatre 1978
- Hippolytus (with Patrick Stewart and Michael Pennington), The Other Place 1978, Warehouse, 1979
- Pericles (with Peter McEnery), The Other Place 1979, Warehouse 1980
- The Suicide (by Erdman, with Roger Rees), Aldwych Theatre 1981, Warehouse 1980
- Romeo and Juliet, The Other Place 1979, Royal Shakespeare Theatre 1980, Aldwych Theatre 1981
- Timon of Athens (with Richard Pasco), The Other Place 1980, Warehouse 1981
- Hansel and Gretel, The Other Place 1980, Warehouse 1981
- A Midsummer Night's Dream (with Juliet Stevenson, Harriet Walter, Mike Gwilym), The Other Place 1979, Royal Shakespeare Theatre 1980, Aldwych Theatre 1981
- Peer Gynt (with Derek Jacobi), The Other Place 1982, Pit, London 1983
- The Tempest (with Derek Jacobi, Mark Rylance), Royal Shakespeare Theatre 1982, Barbican Theatre 1983
- Maydays (with Anthony Sher), Barbican Theatre 1983
- The Mistake, Pit, London 1984
- Unpersons, Pit, London 1984
- Julius Caesar (with Peter McEnery, Gemma Jones), Royal Shakespeare Theatre 1983, Barbican Theatre 1984
- Hamlet (with Roger Rees, Kenneth Branagh), Barbican Theatre 1985, Royal Shakespeare Theatre 1984
- Breaking the Silence (by Stephen Poliakoff, with Daniel Massey, Alan Howard, Juliet Stevenson), Mermaid Theatre 1985, Pit 1984
- Camille (by Pam Gems, with Frances Barber), The Other Place, Comedy Theatre 1985
- Real Dreams (by Trevor Griffiths, with Gary Oldman), Pit, London 1986
- The Danton Affair (by Pam Gems, with Brian Cox); Barbican Theatre 1986
- Much Ado About Nothing (with Fiona Shaw), Tour 1986
- They Shoot Horses Don't They (with Imelda Staunton, Henry Goodman), Mermaid Theatre 1987
- The Plain Dealer, Pit 1989, Swan Theatre 1988
- Hamlet (with Mark Rylance), Royal Shakespeare Theatre 1989, Barbican Theatre, London 1989
- Playing with Trains (with Simon Russell Beale, Michael Pennington, Ralph Fiennes), Pit 1989
- A Clockwork Orange (with music by Bono and The Edge), The Royalty Theatre, London 1990, Barbican Theatre 1990
- Earwig, Pit 1990
- Richard II (with Alex Jennings), Royal Shakespeare Theatre 1990, Barbican Theatre 1991
- Slaughter City (by Naomi Wallace), Pit 1996
- Henry V (with Michael Sheen), Royal Shakespeare Theatre 1997

== US years ==
In 1991, Daniels moved to the US, where he resided for 30 years, until moving back to the UK in 2021.

While in New York he directed Richard II, Richard III and Macbeth for the Theatre for a New Audience and Naomi Wallace's One Flea Spare for the Public Theatre He also directed Much Ado about Nothing and The Taming of the Shrew at the Old Globe in San Diego and most recently, Othello at the Shakespeare Theatre in Washington, DC.

=== Productions ===
==== ART and Institute for Advanced Theatre Training 1991–1996 ====
- Hamlet (with Mark Rylance)
- The Seagull (with Mark Rylance)
- As You Like It
- The Dream of The Red Spider (by Ronald Ribman)
- Silence, Cunning, Exile (by Stuart Greenman)
- Cakewalk (with Elaine Stritch)
- Henry IV parts I and II (with Bill Camp)
- The Cherry Orchard (with Claire Bloom)
- Henry V (with Bill Camp)
- The Threepenny Opera
- The Tempest
- Slaughter City (by Naomi Wallace)
- Long Day's Journey into Night (with Claire Bloom, Michael Stuhlbarg, Bill Camp)

==== As a freelance director in the US ====
- Afore Night Come (Long Wharf Theatre)
- Bingo (with Alvin Epstein)
- Ivanov (with Alvin Epstein)
- Man is Man (with Estelle Parsons)
- Puntila and His Servant Matti, (Yale Repertory Theatre)
- Romeo and Juliet (Guthrie Theatre)
- Camille (by Pam Gems with Kathleen Turner and David Hyde Pierce, Long Wharf Theatre)
- Anthony and Cleopatra (Shakespeare Theatre, DC)
- One Flea Spare (by Naomi Wallace with Diane Weist and Bill Camp, Public Theatre, NY)
- Richard II, Richard III, Macbeth (with Bill Camp, Elizabeth Marvel for Theatre for a New Audience)
- Hedda Gabler (Dallas Theatre Centre)
- Points of Departure (by Michael John Garcés, for INTAR)
- The Suitcase Trilogy (by Han Ong, Ma-yi workshop)
- Havana is Waiting (by Eduardo Machado, Cleveland Playhouse)
- The Front Page (Williamstown Theatre Festival with Richard Kind, Wayne Knight and Jason Butler Harner)
- Kingdom (by Aaron Jafferis) (Old Globe Theatre, San Diego)
- The Taming of the Shrew (Old Globe Theatre, San Diego)
- Much Ado About Nothing (Old Globe Theatre, San Diego)
- Othello (Shakespeare Theatre, DC)

However during his time in the US Daniels still continued to direct some productions in the UK. Namely:

==== National Theatre ====
- Blinded by the Sun (by Stephen Poliakoff with Frances de la Tour)
- Remember This (by Stephen Poliakoff)

== Opera ==
Daniels has worked on Madama Butterfly, La Bohème, Carmen, and Don Giovanni.

=== Productions ===
- The Shepherd King (Boston Opera)
- Madama Butterfly (with Catherine Malfitano/Veronica Villaroel/Patricia Racette/Anamaria Martinez at San Francisco Opera and others)
- Carmen (with Beatrice Uria-Monzon and Marcus Haddock at Houston Opera and others)
- The Turn of the Screw (Berkshire Opera)
- Tosca (with Sondra Radvanoski at Opera Colorado)
- Cosi Fan Tutti (Arizona Opera)
- La Forza del Destino (San Francisco Opera)
- II Postino (with Plácido Domigo and Charles Castronovo, LA Opera – LA, Vienna, Paris, Mexico City, International Festival Cervantino in Guanajuato, Santiago, Chile, Madrid)
- Die Entführurg aus Dem Serail (Opéra de Nice)
- Sweeney Todd, the Demon Barber of Fleet Street (with Rod Gilfry and Karen Ziemba)(Opera Theatre of St. Louis)
- La Boheme (Opera Theatre of St. Louis)
- Pagliacci (Opera Theatre of St. Louis)
- Il Tabarro (Opera Theatre of St. Louis)
- Orfeo and Euridice (Gluck), (Opera Theatre of St. Louis)
- Charlie Parker's Yardbird (with Lawrence Brownlee – Opera Philadelphia, Chicago Lyric Opera, Apollo Theatre (NY), English National Opera, Madison Opera)

== Brazil and Japan ==
In his native Brazil, Ron directed King Lear, Hamlet, Macbeth, Measure for Measure and Colm Tóibín's The Testament of Mary and in Japan, Titus Andronicus and Hamlet.

=== Brazil ===
- Rei Lear (with Raul Cortez)
- Tosca
- Hamlet, Macbeth, Measure for Measure (with Thiago Lacerda)
- O Testamento de Maria (Colm Tóibín)
- Quem está aí? (with Thiago Lacerda)
- A Peste (by Albert Camus, with Thiago Lacerda)

=== Japan ===
- Titus Andronicus (with Mikijro Hira)
- Hamlet (with Mikijiro Hira)

== Film ==
=== Director ===
- The War Boys (feature film) written by Naomi Wallace and Bruce McLeod, with Benjamin Walker, Brian J. Smith, Victor Rasuk, Peter Gallagher)

=== Executive producer ===
- Lawn Dogs (written by Naomi Wallace)

== Move back to the UK ==
In 2021 Daniels moved back to the UK. In summer of 2022 he directed Naomi Wallace and Marcus Rediker's The Return of Benjamin Lay, starring Mark Povonelli at the Finborough Theatre, produced by Arsalan Sattari-Hicks. The Return of Benjamin Lay was restaged again in Pittsburgh in February 2025, under the banner of the Quantum Theatre, and later in New York and Philadelphia, produced by Playhouse Creatures Theatre Company, in association with Quintessence Theatre Groups.

== Acting coach ==
Daniels runs a weekly 'salon' for actors from across the United States, who continue to work with him to refresh their notions of Shakespeare, examine new ideas and to prepare for auditions and roles. The members of these salons range from Tony winners to early career actors trying to work on their craft.

Since his return to the UK, Daniels has established himself as an acting coach with his teaching based in the work of Shakespeare. Daniels offers his expertise to UK actors looking to train further in Shakespeare through workshops, courses and one off top-up sessions.

== Publications and media ==
Daniels is the author of Encontros com Shakespeare, published 22 May 2019.

He is also known for his translations, with Marcus Daud, of Macbeth, Hamlet, King Lear and Measure for Measure (published by SESC, São Paulo) into Portuguese.

=== Contributions ===
Daniels' work with playwright Naomi Wallace is extensively referenced and discussed in The Theatre of Naomi Wallace: Embodied Dialogues by Scott T Cummings and Erica Abbitt Stevens; in which he is also a contributing author in the chapter titled 'Naomi is in my head'.

In 1989 Daniels took his Royal Shakespeare Company production of Hamlet, starring Mark Rylance, to Broadmoor Hospital, a high security psychiatric unit. It was one of a series of Shakespeare tragedies presented to the patients, along with workshops that took place after the performances. The book, Shakespeare Comes to Broadmoor by Murray Cox with a foreword from Sir Ian Mckellen offers insights into the impact of such drama performed in the central hall of Broadmoor Hospital between 1989–1991, upon the actors and audiences. Daniels contributed an interviewed chapter to this publication.

Daniels' work as a director, with emphasis on his Shakespeare work, is heavily referenced and studied in An A–Z Guide to Shakespeare by Stanley Wells (2013); while his contribution to theatre is discussed and referenced further in The Oxford Encyclopedia of Theatre and Performance by Dennis Kennedy (2003), The Oxford Companion to Theatre and Performance by Dennis Kennedy (2010), and The Continuum Companion to Twentieth Century Theatre by Colin Chambers (2006); his Portuguese production and work is mentioned and studied in Flavio Imperio by Renina Katz (2005).

=== Media ===
==== The South Bank Show ====
In 1989, Ron Daniels was interviewed on The South Bank Show with Melvyn Bragg, alongside Richard Eyre and Yuri Lyubimoy, regarding the three simultaneous productions of Hamlet at Royal National Theatre, on tour, and Daniels' production featuring Mark Rylance at the RSC.

==== BBC Late Show ====
In 1990, the BBC Late Show featured an interview with director Ron Daniels, about his production of A Clockwork Orange at the Royal Shakespeare Company, designed by Richard Hudson and featuring music by Bono and The Edge. The feature, along with interviews with Hudson, production manager Mike Arnold, and theatre critic Tom Sutcliffe, discuss the design and the development of the production for a 90's audience.
