= SESC Pompeia =

Sesc Pompeia
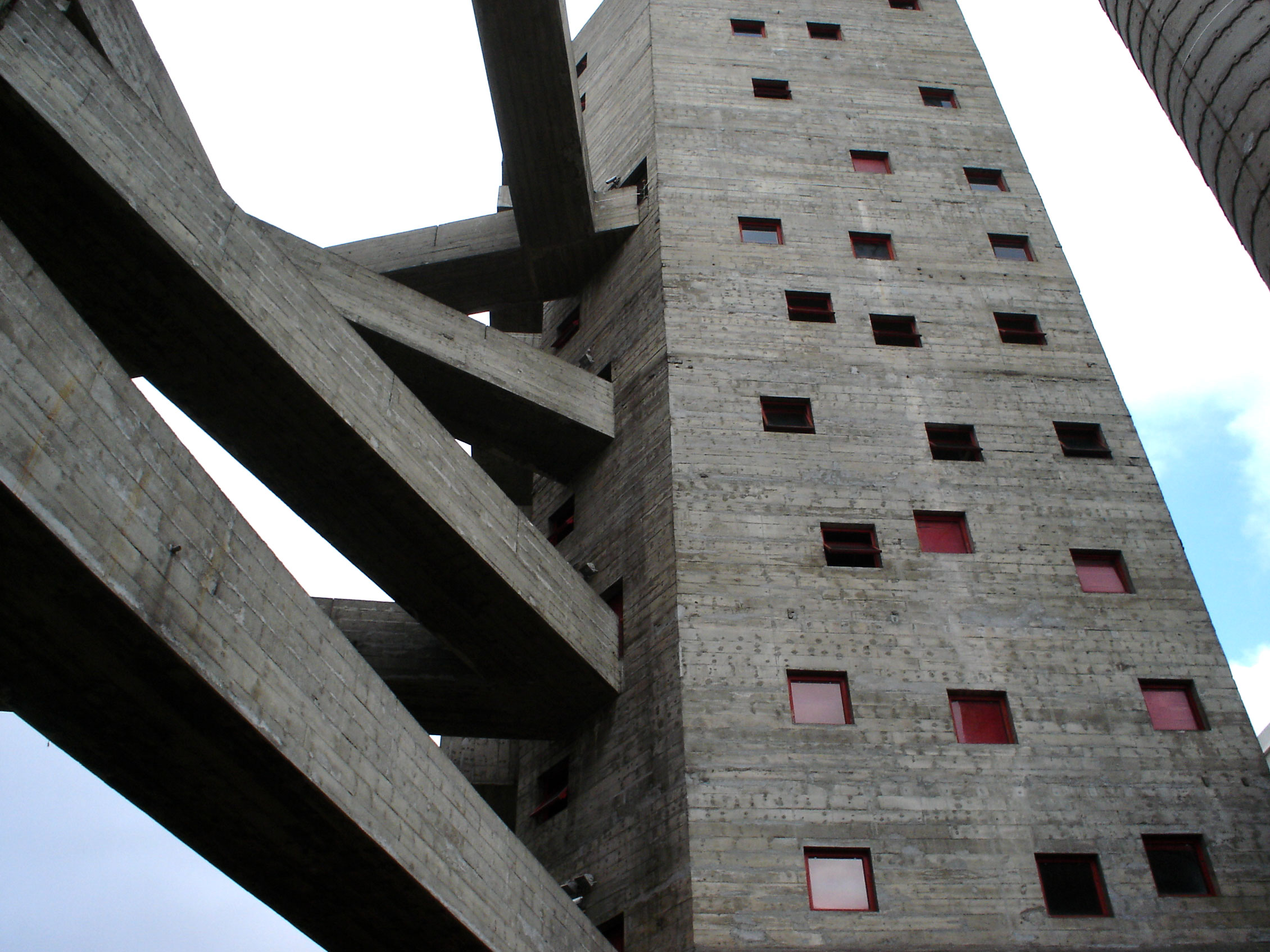
- Interactive map of the Sesc Pompeia area
- Alternative names: Sesc Fábrica da Pompeia

General information
- Location: Rua Clélia, 93 Pompeia, São Paulo/SP. CEP 05042-000., São Paulo, Brazil
- Coordinates: 23°31′33″S 46°41′00.2″W
- Opened: 1982
- Owner: Serviço Social do Comércio

Design and construction
- Architect: Lina Bo Bardi

SESC Pompeia is a cultural and social center located in São Paulo, Brazil. A former factory, the building was converted from 1977 to 1986 by the architect Lina Bo Bardi for the non-profit organization Serviço Social do Comércio (SESC). It is situated near the intermodal terminal Palmeiras-Barra Funda and to the future São Paulo Metro Line 6 Sesc-Pompeia station.

== History ==
The former Fábrica da Pompeia was a factory inaugurated in 1938 by the German company Mauser & Cia Ltda. and was absorbed by the Brazilian industrial company Ibsen in 1945. It was used for making oil drums and later also refrigerators and kerosene.

The architect Lina Bo Bardi, emigrated from Italy with his husband Pietro Maria Bardi is 1946, already made a name for herself in São Paulo with the construction of the São Paulo Museum of Art. In 1976, she visited the working-class neighborhood of Pompeia and entered for the first time in the former factory site. At that time soccer teams and a theater company had previously occupied the building .

The project's priority consisted in keeping and amplifying the vitality the neighborhood people had transmitted to the space, so Bo Bardi insisted in keeping the industrial buildings. To that end she reunited the sports facilities and the changing rooms in two concrete towers, separated by a not buildable zone. To connect the buildings, Bo Bardi designed eight pedestrian walkways.

In turn, she eliminated the factory's inner walls and excavated a rippled swimming pool on the concrete floor.

=== Architecture ===
SESC Pompeia is a brutalist building renowned by its architectural and social qualities. In the back of the complex, Bo Bardi included a pair of concrete towers which house sports facilities, perforated by globular windows and connected to each other by eight walkways.

It has an adjoined theater, a library, various sports halls and other sports facilities, a swimming pool, exhibition rooms, a restaurant, a bar, workshops and workshop rooms, courses, lectures and music events.

The street art exhibitions are a focal point of Pompeia's artistic direction. These include, for example, the DULOCO Festival 1998, Art Market 1999 (including with Nina Pandolfo) and the Pompeia Art Fair 2003 and 2004. It opened on January 22, 1982, and has the capacity to accommodate 5000 people daily.

Along with the Glass House and the São Paulo Museum of Art, it is one of Bo Bardi's modernist works that have marked the architecture of Brazil and beyond.

== Gallery ==
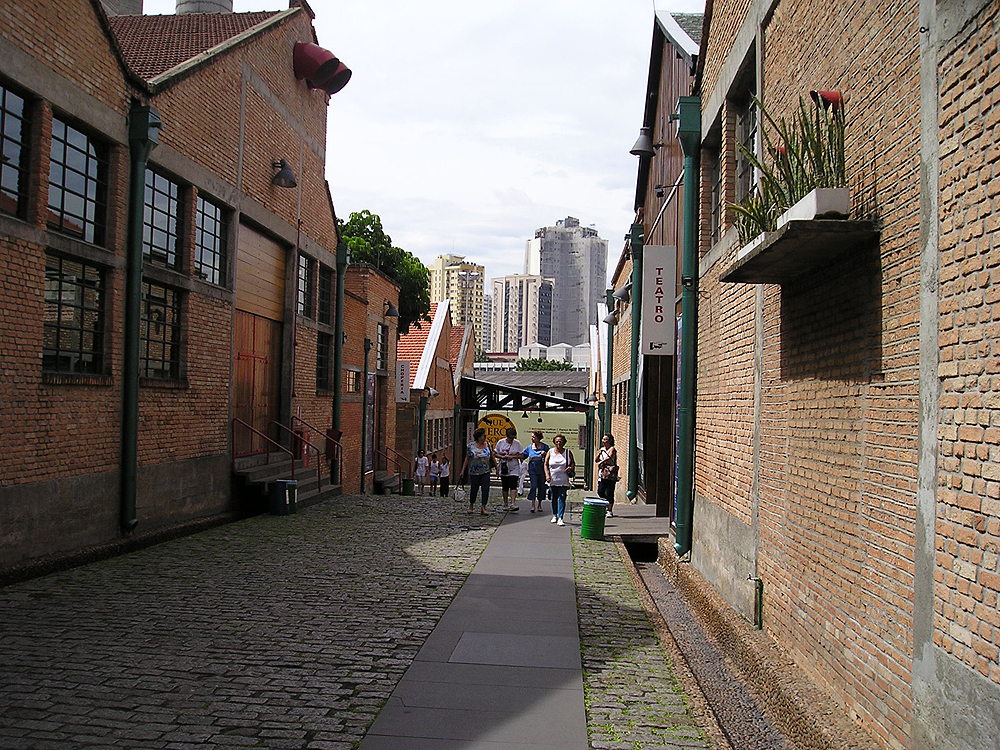
Entrance

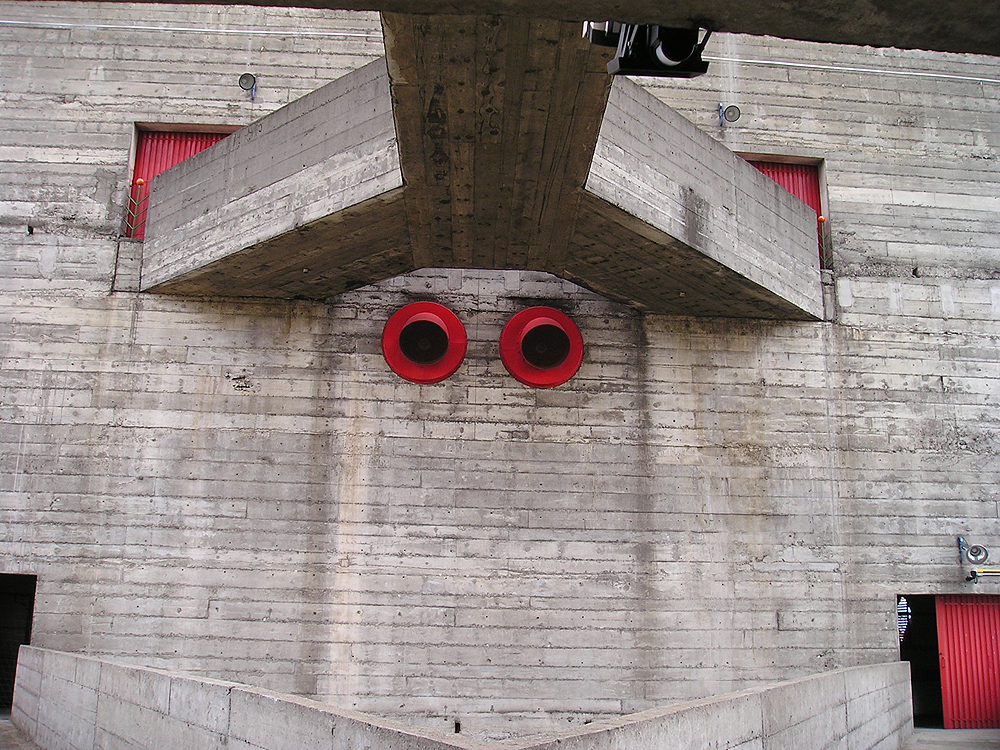
High-rise sports pavilions, detail

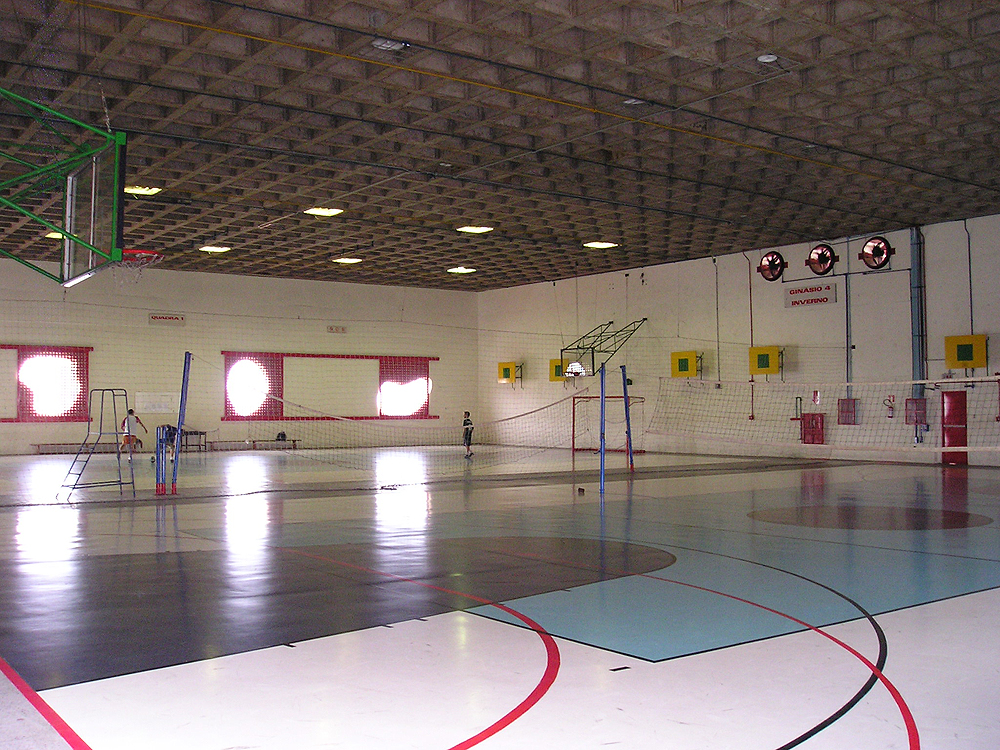
Inside one of the high-rise sports pavilions

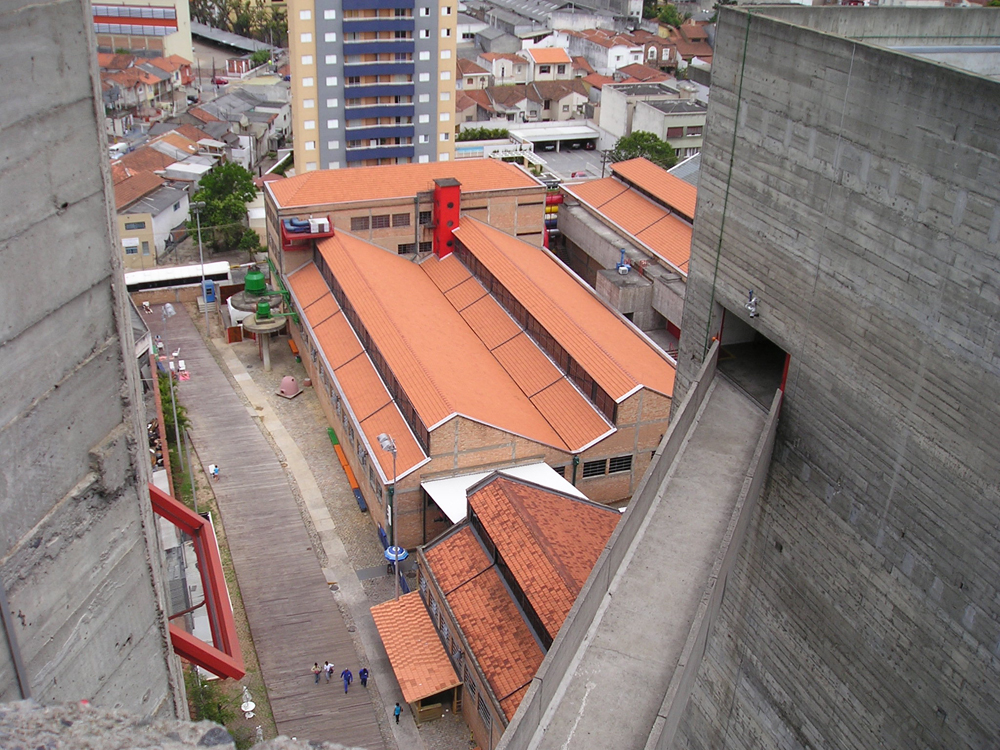
View from above of the old warehouse of the Pompeia factory

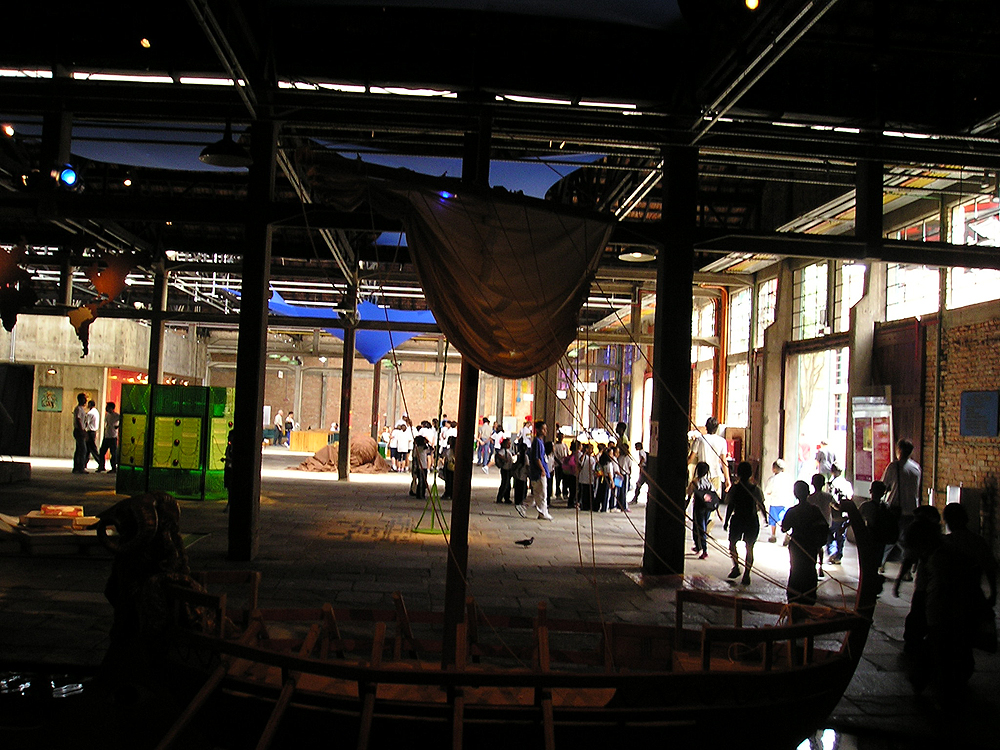
Exhibition hall

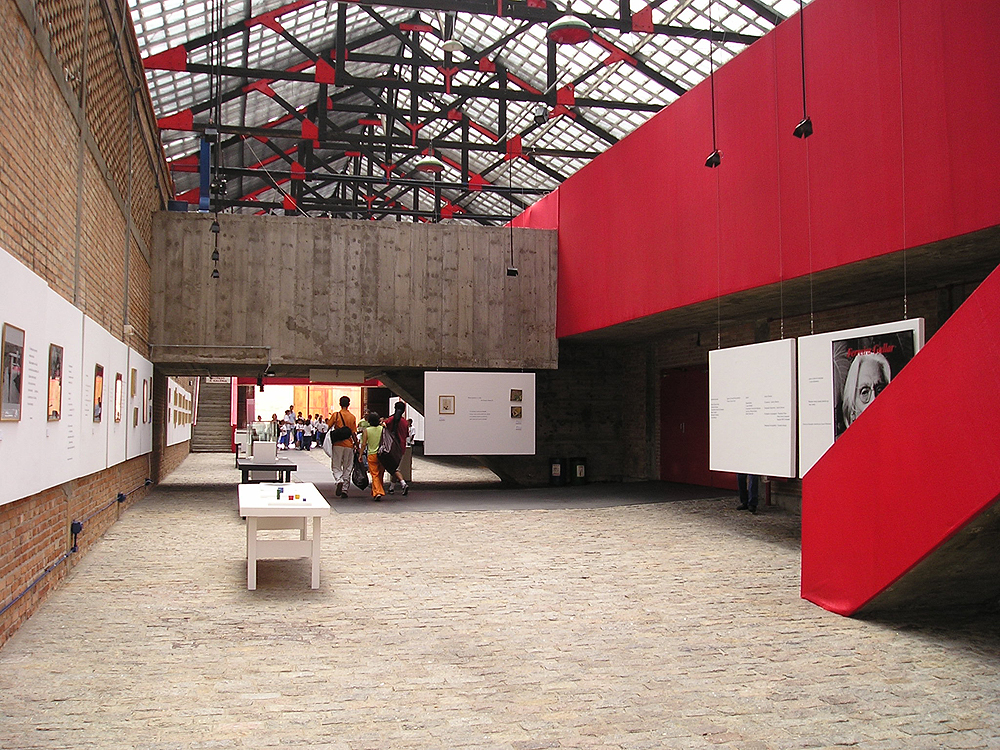
Gallery and theater entrance

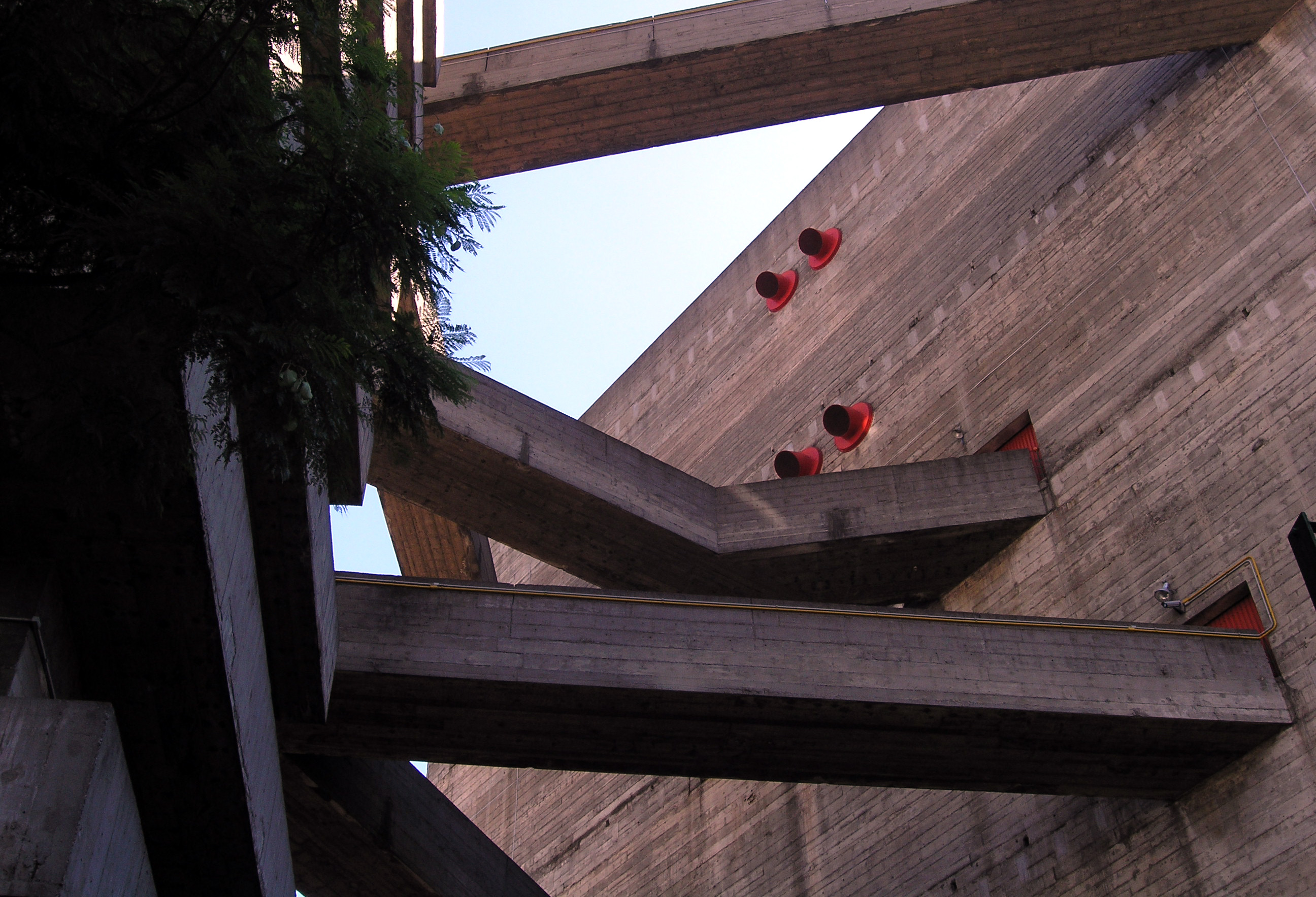
Walkways

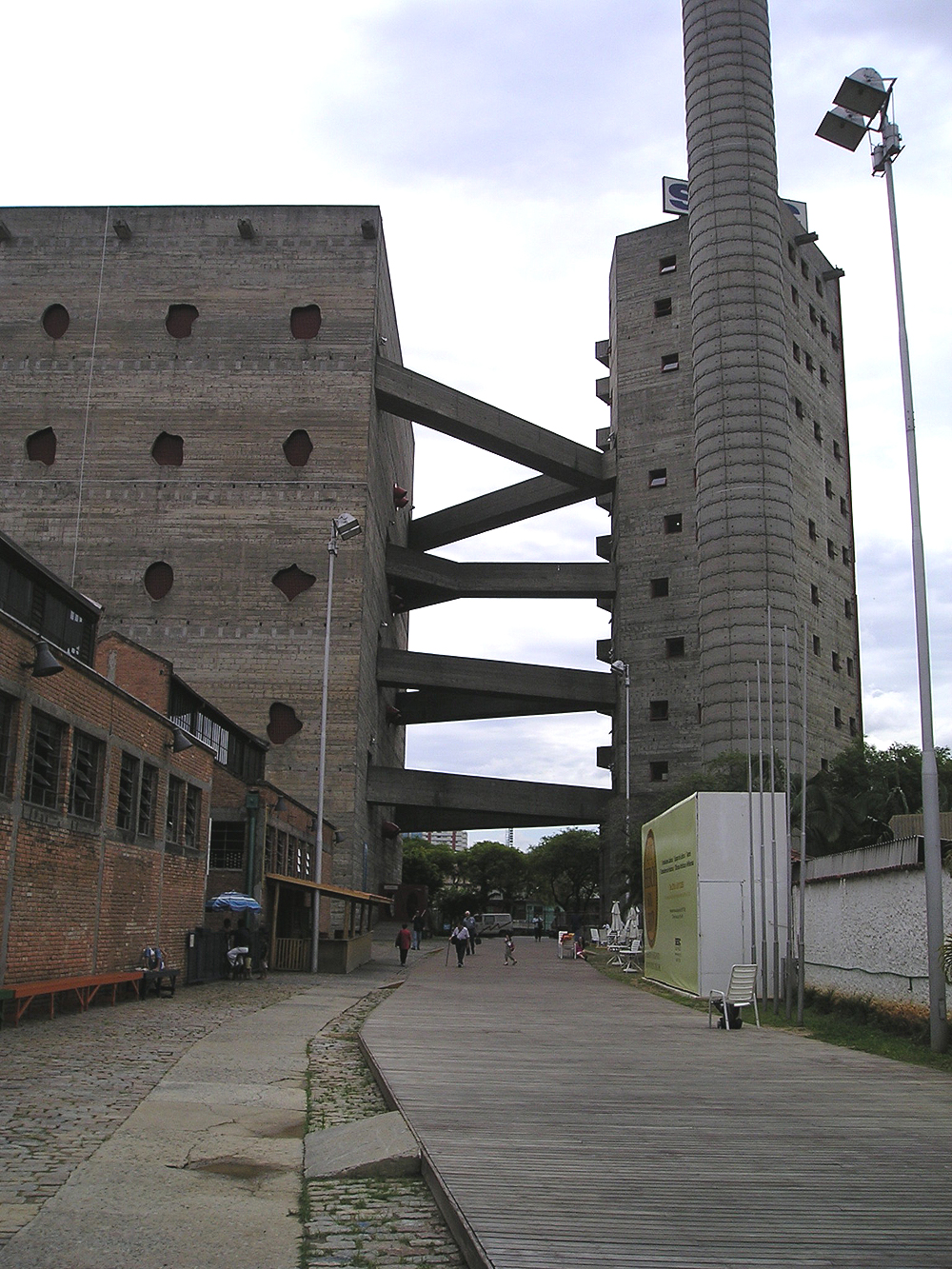
Sports pavillions' buildings
