= Ingénue =

Stock character in literature and media

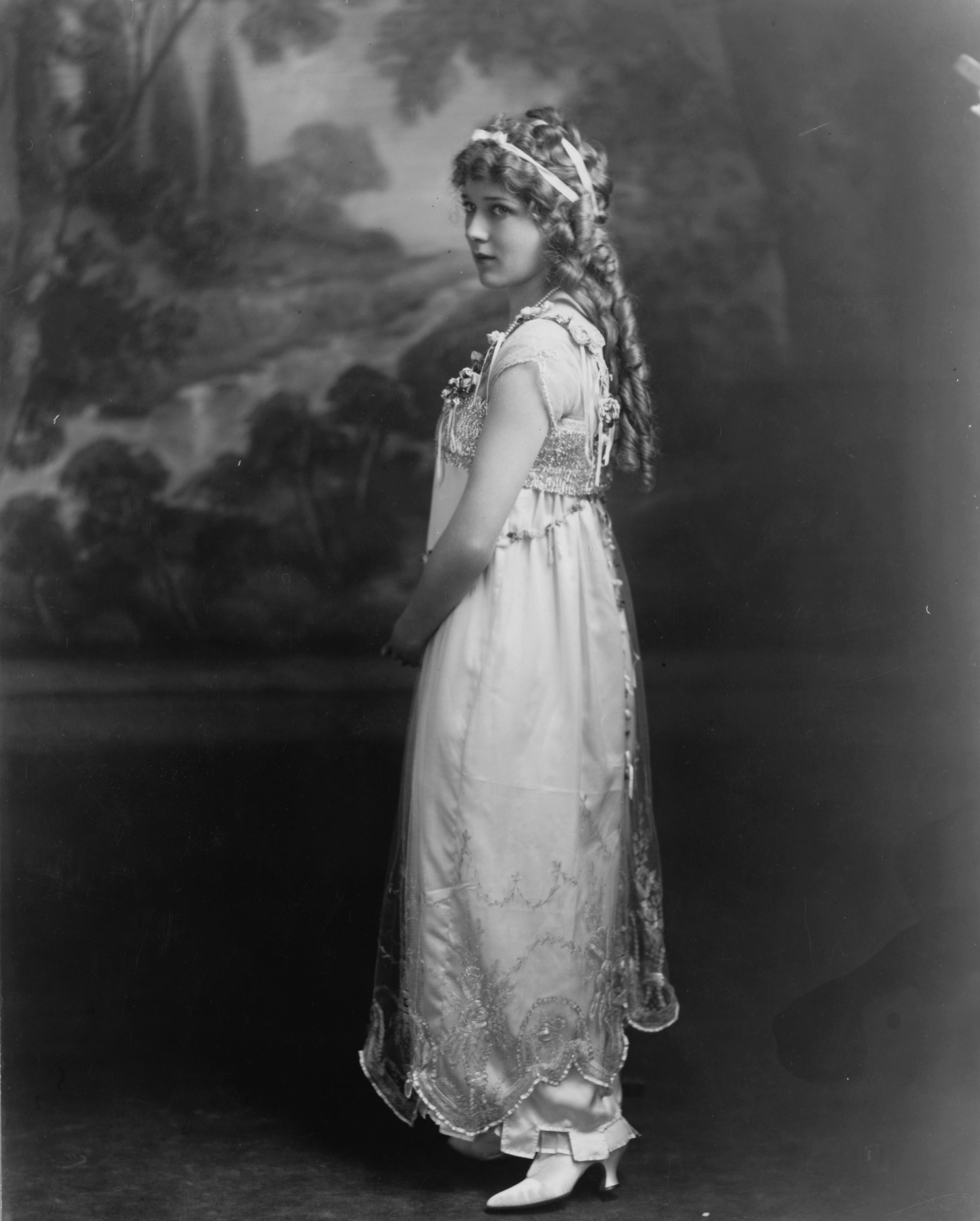
Silent film actress Mary Pickford became one of the first movie stars and helped codify the ingénue archetype on screen.

The ingénue (US: /ˈɒnʒənu/, UK: /ˌænʒeɪˈnjuː/, French: [ɛ̃ʒeny]) is a literary, cinematic, and theatrical stock character that refers to a beautiful, virginal girl or young woman characterized by her innocence and naivety, who has not yet come into contact with the world. It is closely associated with the "girl next door" type.

The term originated in French theatre, where it referred to any young actress playing a major role—the equivalent of the "female juvenile lead" in English theatre. Heroines fell within this category, as long as they were young characters rather than roles taken by the company's leading lady. In French literature, Molière is credited with introducing the ingénue in his 17th-century play The School for Wives. Examples of parts that would have fallen to the ingénue include those of Ophelia, Desdemona, and Cordelia in Shakespearean theatre, and Mariane in Tartuffe and Aricie in Phèdre in French theatre. The ingénue found particularly fertile ground in melodrama, a genre rich in such roles.

During the early days of silent film, Mary Pickford became one of the first movie stars and helped codify the ingénue archetype on screen, which served as a foil to more worldly female types such as the vamp. During the studio era, Deanna Durbin became one of the archetype's most emblematic figures in classical Hollywood cinema, while in Europe it found its greatest expression in the Telefoni Bianchi films of Italian cinema; and in Latin America, it became one of the dominant styles of the Golden Age of Argentine cinema, embodied by teenage debutantes like Mirtha Legrand.

== See also ==
- Gamine
- Loosu ponnu
- Moe (slang)
- Soubrette

== Bibliography ==
- Kennedy, Dennis (2003). The Oxford Encyclopedia of Theatre & Performance: A-L. Oxford University Press. ISBN 0-19-860672-9.
