= Dennis Kennedy (author) =

American and Irish writer

Dennis Kennedy (born 1 November 1940, Cincinnati, Ohio, United States), is the Samuel Beckett Professor of Drama and Theatre (Emeritus) in Trinity College Dublin. A widely published author of books on theatre, performance, and religion, he is also a playwright, director, and fiction writer. He holds dual citizenship in the USA and Ireland.

== Career ==
Kennedy studied literature, philosophy, and history at the University of San Francisco and was president of the College Players. After graduating, he trained at the US Naval Officer Candidate School in Newport, Rhode Island, before being assigned as communications officer on the USS Graffias in Japan and the Pacific during the early stages of the American War in Vietnam. His next post was shore duty in Pearl Harbor; he acted professionally in Honolulu during that time.

He did graduate work at Oxford and the University of California, Santa Barbara, receiving the PhD in 1972. For a decade he taught literature and theatre at Grand Valley State in western Michigan. Under the initiative of Michael Birtwistle he helped establish an alternative theatre in Grand Rapids, called Stage 3, where he acted, directed, wrote, and founded the Michigan New Plays Festival. In 1973 he was Senior Fulbright Lecturer at the University of Karachi in Pakistan and in 1976– 77 playwright-in-residence at the University of Oregon. He spent two separate years researching in London and Oxford on fellowships from the US National Endowment for the Humanities.

In 1983 he moved to the University of Pittsburgh, where he was director of graduate studies in theatre and taught in the Cultural Studies program. By then his own plays had been performed in art theatres in New York, London, and in regional theatres in the US. He also began to advise theatres in London, Canada, and the US on the performance of the plays of Harley Granville Barker and G. B. Shaw, and lectured worldwide on Shakespeare, theatre, and the relationship of art to politics.

Kennedy's scholarly books on theatre and performance, published by Oxford and Cambridge university presses, brought a different type of recognition. His work on Shakespeare began a process of changing what had been an insular approach centred on the text in English to a broader understanding of the importance of Shakespeare internationally, outside the English language. Granville Barker and the Dream of Theatre, widely praised by John Gielgud and Peter Hall among others, re-evaluated the importance of England's foundational director. Looking at Shakespeare, which reviewed design and the visual in twentieth-century production, argued that the meaning of performance is as dependent on what is seen as on what is spoken. This was followed by Foreign Shakespeare, a volume that was a turning point in Shakespeare studies, emphasizing the significance of performance in Europe and outside English. By the time Shakespeare in Asia was released some fifteen years later, a shift from the Anglo-centred approach to England's national poet had been broadly noted in scholarship and performance.

In 1994 he was appointed the inaugural holder of the Samuel Beckett Chair of Drama and Theatre in Trinity College Dublin, where he remained until retirement. He founded the film studies program, and in collaboration with the Abbey Theatre (the National Theatre of Ireland) and the Irish Film Institute he established training programs for actors and filmmakers. His edition of The Oxford Encyclopedia of Theatre and Performance, and its subsequent redactions in the Oxford Companion series, received wide praise and have become the standard reference works in the field. His book on audiences, entitled The Spectator and the Spectacle, consolidated his wide thinking about the nature of public reception in performance, and included studies of audiences for sport, TV game shows, museums, gambling, and religious ritual.

In the theatre Kennedy directed many new plays as well as Shakespeare's As You Like It in Beijing in 2005 and Brecht's The Caucasian Chalk Circle in Dublin in 2006. In 2013 he began writing short stories, which appeared in a number of literary magazines. Fossil Light: A Novel in Films was published in 2023. His most recent book, Creating Jesus, a study of the gospel of Mark as literary and historical document, consolidated a life-long interest in the history of Christianity and its place in contemporary culture.

== Awards and honors ==
Kennedy won the Freedley Award for theatre history twice, the Chancellor's Distinguished Research Award at Pittsburgh, the Pennsylvania Arts Council Award for playwriting, three major awards from the National Endowment for the Humanities, the Berkeley Fellowship in Trinity College Dublin, and was elected to the Academia Europaea. Also elected to the Royal Irish Academy, he chaired its committee on languages, literature, and culture for a number of years and organized an international series of lectures and conferences on human rights and the humanities. In 2021 he gave the opening address to the World Shakespeare Congress in Singapore, and he continues to lecture and present acting workshops around the globe. He has held fellowships and visiting appointments from Berlin and Salzburg to Singapore and Beijing, including distinguished visiting professorships at the universities of Victoria and McMaster in Canada and Wisconsin and California Santa Barbara in the US.

== Personal life ==
He has been married to Annie Tyrrell since 1970, and they now live in Dublin and southwest France. They have three daughters: Miranda, an author and journalist in Washington, and the twins Jessica and Megan, who are dancers and co-artistic directors of Junk Ensemble, a dance-theatre troupe in Dublin.

== Works ==
Books

- Kennedy, Dennis (2024). Creating Jesus: The Earliest Record of Yeshua of Nazareth. Wipf and Stock. ISBN 979-8-3852-2459-3.
- Kennedy, Dennis (2023). Fossil Light: a novel in films. Blackrock Press Dublin. ISBN 978-1-3999-6206-3.
- Kennedy, Dennis, ed (2010). The Oxford Companion to Theatre and Performance. Oxford University Press. ISBN 978-0-19-957419-3. Revised paperback (2011), ISBN 978-0-19-957457-5.
- Kennedy, Dennis and Yong, Li Lan, eds (2010). Shakespeare in Asia: Contemporary Performance. Cambridge University Press. ISBN 978-0-521-51552-8.
- Kennedy, Dennis (2009). The Spectator and the Spectacle: Audiences in Modernity and Postmodernity. Cambridge University Press. ISBN 978-0-521-89976-5.
- Kennedy, Dennis (2003). The Oxford Encyclopedia of Theatre & Performance. 2 vols. Oxford University Press. ISBN 978-0-19-860174-6.
- Kennedy, Dennis (2001). Looking at Shakespeare: A Visual History of Twentieth-Century Performance. Second edition. Cambridge University Press. ISBN 978-0-521-78057-8.
- Kennedy, Dennis, ed (1993b). Foreign Shakespeare: Contemporary Performance. Cambridge University Press. ISBN 978-0-521-61708-6
- Kennedy, Dennis (1993a). Looking at Shakespeare: A Visual History of Twentieth-Century Performance. First edition. Cambridge University Press. ISBN 978-0-521-57686-5.
- Kennedy, Dennis, ed. Plays by Harley Granville Barker. Cambridge University Press, (1987, 1990). ISBN 978-0521-31407-0.
- Kennedy, Dennis (1985). Granville Barker and the Dream of Theatre. Cambridge University Press. ISBN 978-0-521-25480-9. Revised paperback (1989), ISBN 978-0-521-37996-0.

Selected essays and journalism

Program essays and review pieces (1985–2020) for the Abbey Theatre (Dublin), the Globe Theatre (London) and its magazine Around the Globe, the Shaw Festival (Canada), Central Academy of Drama (Beijing), City Theatre (Pittsburgh), Long Wharf Theatre (New Haven), and George Street Playhouse (New Brunswick).

"Shakespeare’s Refugees" (2024). Shakespeare Survey 77, 217–225.

"Global Shakespeare and Globalized Performance," (2017). The Oxford Handbook of Shakespeare and Performance, ed. James Bulman. Oxford University Press.

"Fusion ist Zukunft: Shakespeare und Kultur" (2014). A Party for Will, eds. Petra Hesse und Peter W. Marx. Berlin: Theater der Zeit.

"The Future Is Fusion," (2012). Foreword to Shakespeare and Culture, ed. Bi-qi Beatrice Lei and Ching-Hsi Perng. Taipei: National Taiwan University Press.

"Shakespeare e o espectáculo globalizado" (2009). Shakespeare entre nós, ed. Maria Helena Serôdio, João Almeida Flor, et al. Ribeirão: Húmas.

"Beckett and Trinity College Dublin" (2009). Foreword to Reflections on Beckett: A Centenary Celebration, eds. Anna McMullan and S. E. Wilmer. University of Michigan Press.

"Shakespeare, Histories and Nations" (2005). European Review 13.

"The Director, the Spectator, and the Eiffel Tower" (2005). Theatre Research International, 30.1, 36–48.

"British Theatre 1895-1946: art, entertainment, audiences" (2004). Introduction to vol. 3 (the twentieth century) of The Cambridge History of British Theatre, ed. Baz Kershaw. Cambridge University Press.

"Confessions of an Encyclopedist" (2004). Theorizing Practice: Redefining Theatre History, eds. W. B. Worthen and Peter Holland. (London: Palgrave Macmillan.

"Shakespeare and the Cold War" (2003). Four Hundred Years of Shakespeare in Europe, eds. Ton Hoenselaars and Angel-Luis Pujante. University of Delaware Press.

"Shakespeare Worldwide" (2001). Cambridge Companion to Shakespeare, eds. Margreta di Grazia and Stanley Wells. Cambridge University Press.

"Sports and Shows: Spectators in Contemporary Culture" (2001). Theatre Research International, 26.3, 277–284.

"Shakespeare and Cultural Tourism" (1998). Theatre Journal 50, 175–188.

"Shakespeare without His Language" (1996). Shakespeare, Theory, and Performance, ed. James C. Bulman. London: Routledge.

"Shakespeare and the Global Spectator" (1995). Shakespeare Jahrbuch 131, 50–64.

"Shakespeare Played Small: Three Speculations about the Body" (1994). Shakespeare Survey 47, 1–13.

"The Director as Scenographer: Ciulei’s Shakespeare at the Guthrie" (1989). Theatre Three 7, 35–47.

"Granville Barker’s Sexual Comedy" (1980). Modern Drama 23, 75–82.

"King Lear and the Theatre" (1976). Theatre Journal 28, 35–44.
