= Space Caviar =

Architecture studio in Milan, Italy

Space Caviar is an architecture and research studio based in Milan, Italy. It was founded in 2013 by architects Joseph Grima and Tamar Shafrir. Their work has been shown at the Venice Architecture Biennale, the Victoria and Albert Museum, Biennale Interieur, Vitra Design Museum and the Munich Film Museum.

Recurring themes in the work of Space Caviar include the impact of media and technology on social relations, and the design of domesticity. As curator of Biennale Interieur, Space Caviar presented a series of works and exhibitions including The Theatre of Everyday Life and the film Fortress of Solitude, which were together poised to ask challenging questions on the past, present and future of the home under the umbrella title SQM: The Home Does Not Exist.

Space Caviar have edited and contributed to numerous publications including SQM: The Quantified Home published by Lars Müller Publishers, designed by Studio Folder, and the recipient of a gold medal at the European Design Awards 2015.

In 2018, Space Caviar presented Lina Bo Bardi Giancarlo Palanti Studio D’Arte Palma 1948 – 1951, a retrospective of work by architect Lina Bo Bardi at Fuorisalone Design Week Milan.
