= Universidade Livre de Música =

Escola de Música do Estado de São Paulo - EMESP
- Type: Public university
- Established: October, 1989
- Rector: Tom Jobim
- Location: São Paulo, São Paulo, Brazil
- Campus: Urban
- Website: www.ulm.org.br

Universidade Livre de Música (ULM) (English: Free University of Music) is a music school linked to Centro Tom Jobim, located in São Paulo. It offers regular courses and free courses, and concerts, workshops and masterclasses with locations in the neighborhoods of Brooklin Novo and Luz. It is a free school and aims at training professionals in the music business. The coexistence of musical scholars and professionals bodied integrated to Centro Tom Jobim provides students with a differentiated experience, preparing for its entrance into artistic life.

== History ==
The university was established in 1989 by Tom Jobim. First president and dean was Antonio Carlos Jobim. After 2001, the university received a name: the Tom Jobim School of Music – EMESP Tom Jobim.
