= Junk Ensemble =

Irish dance theatre company

- Formation: 2004
- Type: Theatre group
- Purpose: Dance theatre
- Location: Dublin, Ireland
- Members: Jessica Kennedy; Megan Kennedy
- Website: junkensemble.com

Junk Ensemble (styled junk ensemble) is an Irish dance theatre company working in a genre related to Tanztheater. The company was established in 2004 by identical twin sisters Jessica and Megan Kennedy. It is based in Dublin and tours throughout Europe and North America. Its productions focus on unique and original visuals and production methods.

== Awards ==
Junk Ensemble won the Culture Ireland Touring Award in 2008. In 2011, they won the Dublin Fringe Festival Best Production Award for their production Bird with Boy, and Drinking Dust was listed as an Irish Times Highlight the same year.

== Press ==
The Sunday Times has written that "junk ensemble has created some of the most impressive contemporary dance in Ireland of recent years" and Irish Theatre Magazine wrote that Junk Ensemble "do not disappoint in artistic experiment with bold visual staging and musical adventuring."

== Productions ==
Productions are listed with the year and venue of their debut.

- The Rain Party (2007)
- Drinking Dust (2008)
- Pygmalian Revisited (2010) - Aix-en Provence Festival
- Five Ways to Drown (2010) - Dublin Dance Festival
- Sometimes We Break (2012) - Tate Britain
- Bird with Boy (2011) - Dublin Fringe Festival
- The Falling Song (2012) - Dublin Dance Festival
- Blind Runner (2013) - Dance Ireland, short film
- Dusk Ahead (2013) - Kilkenny Arts Festival
- It Folds (2015) - Abbey Theatre, joint production with Brokentalkers
- Walking Pale (2016) - Dublin Dance Festival
- Soldier Still (2017) - Dublin Fringe Festival
- Dolores (2018) - Dublin Dance Festival
