= Miranda Kennedy =

American journalist and writer (born 1975)

- Citizenship: American
- Education: MFA
- Alma mater: Bennington College
- Occupations: Journalist, writer
- Employer: National Public Radio
- Notable work: Sideways on a Scooter

Miranda Kennedy is an American journalist and writer. Her first book, Sideways on a Scooter: Life and Love in India, was published by Random House in 2011. Part memoir, part reported nonfiction, it tells the story of several Indian women to describe the slow pace of social and cultural change in India. The book received praise from The Washington Post, Macleans and Kirkus Reviews among others.

Kennedy lived in New Delhi, India for five years, as a reporter covering South Asia for National Public Radio and American Public Media's Marketplace Radio.

Kennedy runs podcasts at Vox Media. She holds an MFA in creative nonfiction from Bennington College in Vermont and a BA degree from Trinity College Dublin in Ireland.
