= Zé Celso =

Brazilian stage actor, director and playwright (1937–2023)

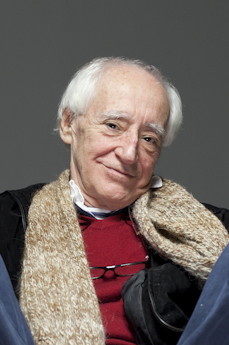
- Celso in 2010
- Born: José Celso Martinez Corrêa; 30 March 1937; Araraquara, São Paulo, Brazil
- Died: 6 July 2023 (aged 86); São Paulo, Brazil
- Education: Law School, University of São Paulo (dropped out)
- Occupations: Stage actor, director and playwright
- Years active: 1958–2023
- Notable work: The Bacchae, Os Sertões, O Rei da Vela, Roda Viva
- Movement: Anthropophagism
- Spouse: Marcelo Drummond (m. 2023)
- Website: teatroficina.com

José Celso Martinez Corrêa (30 March 1937 – 6 July 2023), known as Zé Celso, was a Brazilian stage actor, director and playwright. He was one of the founders of Teatro Oficina, an innovative and politically active theater company associated with the 1960s Tropicalismo movement.

Zé Celso became notable in the scene with his adaptation of Oswald de Andrade's play O Rei da Vela (The Candle King), in 1967. He also co-wrote with Chico Buarque the 1968 play Roda Viva, which was targeted as pornographic and was censored during the military dictatorship. One of his final plays was Os Sertões, a trilogy adapting the book by Euclides da Cunha.

== Personal life and death ==
Zé Celso was in a 40-year relationship with actor Marcelo Drummond. The couple married in June 2023, with a ceremony at Teatro Oficina.

Zé Celso died in São Paulo on 6 July 2023, at the age of 86. He was hospitalized at Hospital das Clínicas, after a fire broke out in his apartment in the Paraíso neighborhood. Zé Celso was 53% burned and was under mechanical ventilation; his husband Marcelo, two visitors, and the couple's dog, who were also in the apartment, did not sustain burns, but were under observation at the hospital.
