= Teatro Oficina =

Brazilian theatre company

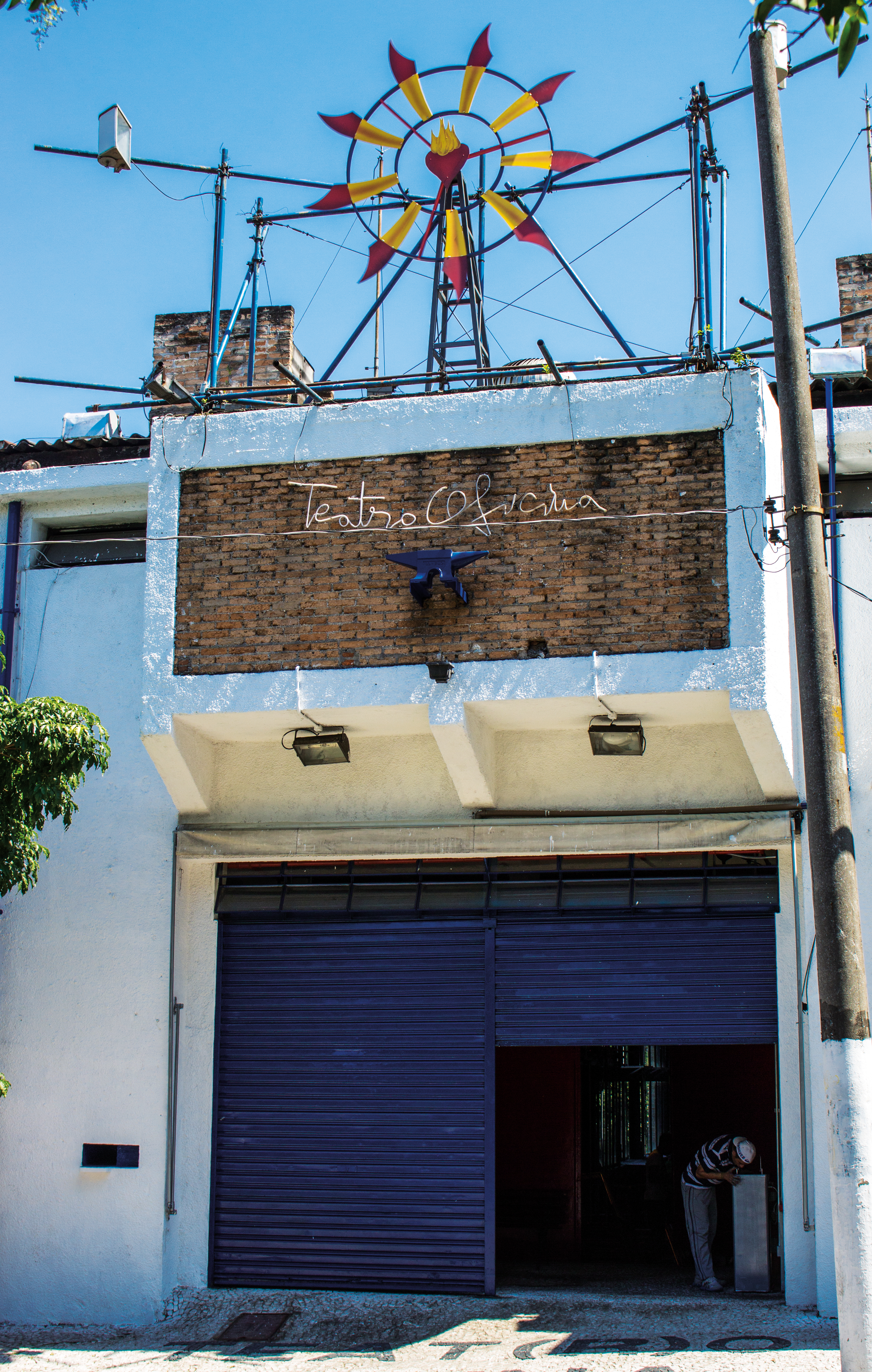
- Teatro Oficina headquarters.
- Interactive map of the Teatro Oficina area

General information
- Location: São Paulo, São Paulo; Brazil
- Coordinates: 23°33′18″S 46°38′28.52″W
- Construction started: 1958; 68 years ago

Website
- www.teatroficina.com.br

Teat(r)o Oficina Uzyna Uzona or simply Teatro Oficina (English: Oficina Theater), is a theater company based in the neighborhood of Bixiga, in the Brazilian city of São Paulo. It was founded in 1958 at the Law School of the University of São Paulo by Amir Haddad, José Celso Martinez Correa, Carlos Queiroz Telles and Ron Daniels.

In 1966, the company's headquarters was destroyed by a fire. Remounts of plays were staged to raise funds and restore the building. Teatro Oficina is currently run by Marcelo Drummond, widower of Zé Celso, who died in 2023.

The current building was designed in 1984 by Lina Bo Bardi and Edson Elito and inaugurated in 1994. In 2015, it was chosen by The Guardian as the best theater in the world in the architectural design category. Since the 1980s, Teatro Oficina has been involved in a dispute with Grupo Silvio Santos, which intends to build residential towers on the land next to the venue.

== History ==
=== Amateur phase (1958-1961) ===
Teatro Oficina was created in 1958 during an artists' meeting at the 11 de Agosto Academic Center of the Law School of the University of São Paulo, which included José Celso Martinez Corrêa, Renato Borghi, Etty Fraser, Fauzi Arap, Ronaldo Daniel and Amir Haddad.

In 1961, the company decided to professionalize and acquired an old building on Jaceguai Street where the Teatro Novos Comediantes, a spiritualist troupe, used to operate. When they arrived, they realized that the previous owner had removed all the furniture and the structure of a theater was gone. Architect Joaquim Guedes conceived the space as a "sandwich", with two audiences facing each other and separated by the central stage.

=== Professionalization and fire (1961-1973) ===
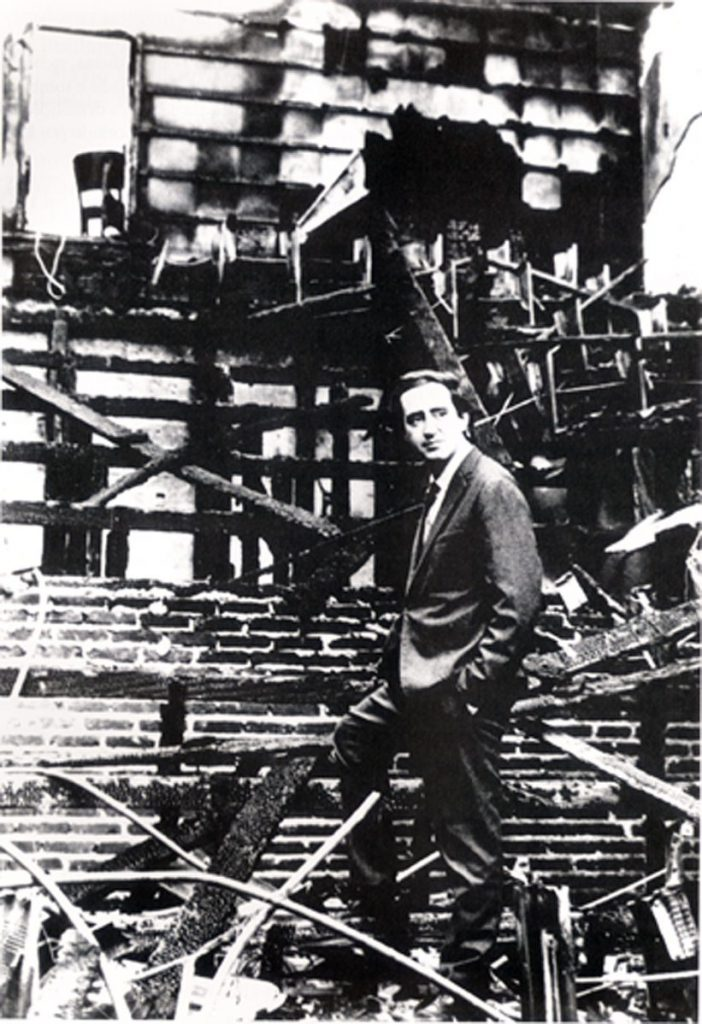
Zé Celso amidst the rubble of the building in 1966.

On August 16, 1961, after the establishment of the professional troupe and the performance hall, Clifford Odets' Awake and Sing! was staged. In 1962, Teatro Oficina staged A Streetcar Named Desire by Tennessee Williams, directed by Augusto Boal, and Squaring the Circle, written by Valentin Kataev and directed by Maurice Vaneau. In 1963, The Philistines, by Russian playwright Maxim Gorky, premiered. However, with the civil-military coup the following year, the play was censored and part of the text, which included the anthem of the Communist International, was cut out.

On May 31, 1966, the building was destroyed by a fire caused by a short circuit. Cleaner Argemiro and electrician Domingos Fiorini were present at the site. The flames reached the neighboring properties and destroyed all the material in the theater; only the facade and external walls remained. The next day, 80 artists gathered in front of the building and decided to present two shows to raise money for the reconstruction of the theater: a musical, directed by Ary Toledo, and a comedy, directed by Jô Soares.

Cacilda Becker granted its theater for the group to present the plays Awake and Sing!, The Philistines and Andorra to raise funds for the reconstruction of the new venue. The governor of Paraná, Paulo Pimentel, supported the troupe by sponsoring the reopening of the theater with Oswald de Andrade's O Rei da Vela, on September 29, 1967. Zé Celso was inspired by the movie Entranced Earth, by Glauber Rocha, which later also influenced Caetano Veloso to create the Tropicália movement.

After the release of the film Prata Palomares in 1971, an internal crisis arose and the company disbanded. Later, it reappeared with another team, but still under the leadership of Zé Celso and Renato Borghi, who sponsored the arrival of the American experimental group The Living Theatre. Oficina Usyna Uzona emerged after the presentation of the collective work Gracias, Señor. In 1972, an autobiographical recreation of Anton Chekhov's Three Sisters was staged.

=== Zé Celso's exile and resurgence ===
In 1974, Zé Celso was arrested and exiled by the Brazilian military dictatorship. He moved to Portugal and returned to Brazil in 1979. In 1982, the building was listed as a historical site by the Council for the Defense of Historical, Archaeological, Artistic and Tourist Heritage (Condephaat), for its importance to Brazilian art. In 1984, the venue was officially renamed Teatro Oficina Uzyna Uzona. In the same year, Lina Bo Bardi and Edson Elito launched a new project for the theater, which ended in 1994.

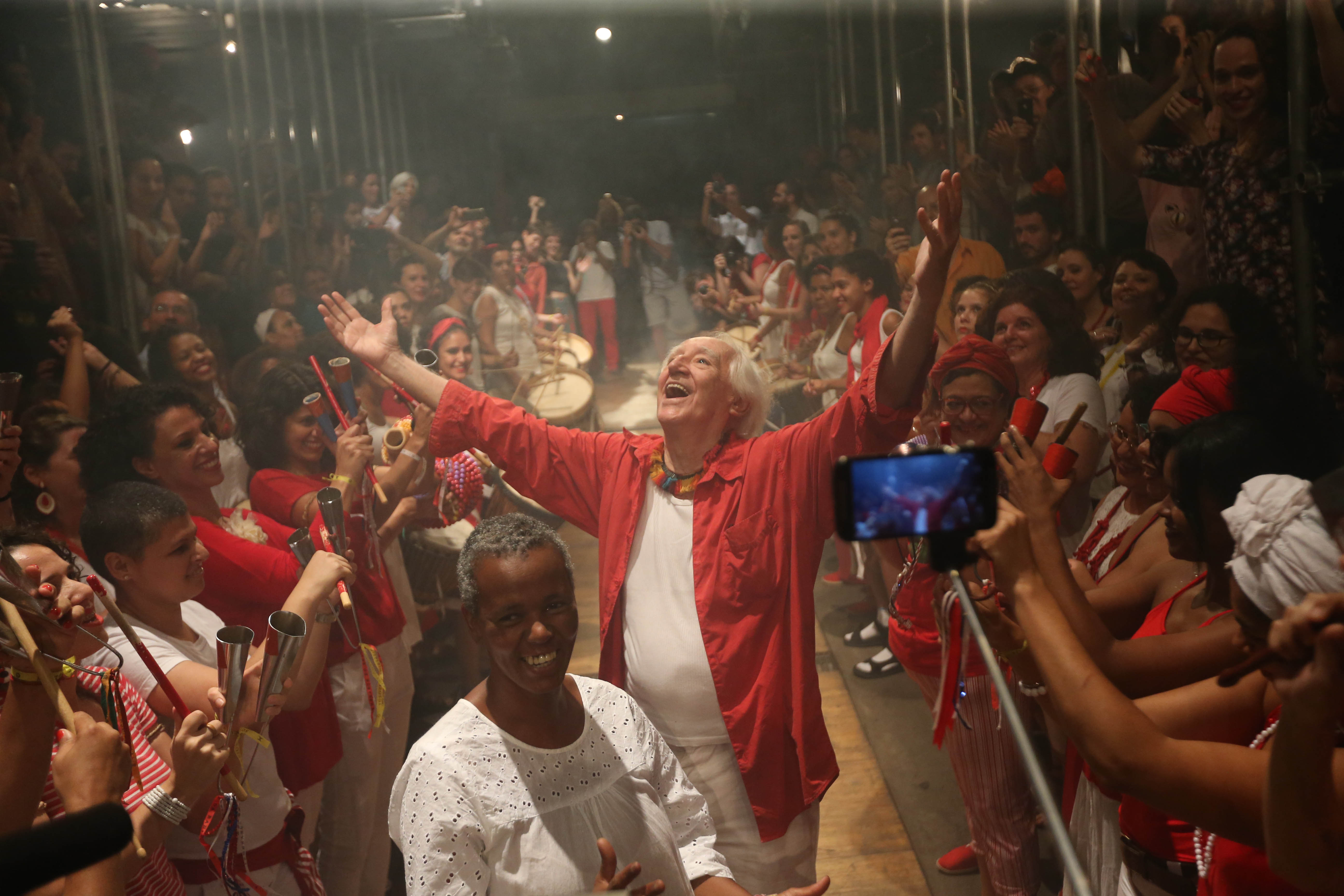
José Celso Martinez Correa and part of the company.

The renovation included a central walkway 1.5 meters wide and 50 meters long, and front and back accesses. The audience, distributed in side galleries on four levels, can accommodate up to 350 people. The layout allows the spectator to have different points of view during the performance. The extended design with iron scaffolding, an exposed brick structure, internal plant beds, a large window and the stage-platform connection represent the start of a new phase for the company. In 2015, the British newspaper The Guardian considered the theater's architectural design the "best in the world" in its category.

The troupe attracted public attention with the staging of Shakespeare's Ham-et in 1993, which inaugurated the new building. In 1996, the adaptation of Euripides' The Bacchae and, in 1998, the staging of Zé Celso's play Cacilda! also achieved great success. Between 2002 and 2006, Zé Celso staged Os Sertões by Euclides da Cunha. In 2010, the building was listed as a historic site by the National Institute of Historic and Artistic Heritage (IPHAN).

=== Conflict with Grupo Silvio Santos ===
In the 1980s, Grupo Silvio Santos acquired land next to the theater with the aim of constructing 100-meter buildings, which would damage the theater, classified as a historical heritage site since 2010 at the federal, state and municipal levels. Over the decades, Zé Celso and Silvio Santos held several meetings to try to resolve the impasse.

In May 2018, IPHAN approved the construction of the residential buildings. According to the authorities, the process fulfills the rules regarding the landmark process and the positive decision refers "strictly to the delimitations of the surrounding and heritage areas". In the case of the Teatro Oficina, which has a facade with a glass window, IPHAN's restricted construction area is defined by a visual cone with a 45º opening on either side of the window; no building can be constructed within 20 meters of the west side of the theater.

Video of the meeting between Zé Celso, Silvio Santos, Eduardo Suplicy and João Doria, then Mayor of São Paulo.

On December 4, 2018, the Federal Public Prosecutor's Office (MPF) in São Paulo organized a meeting to resolve an impasse between Zé Celso and Grupo Silvio Santos. After the discussion, which failed to reach a consensus between the parties, the MPF decided to file a lawsuit seeking the preservation of the cultural heritage. For the theater's representatives, the construction would not respect the preservation of the building. In December 2019, the Municipal Council for the Preservation of the Historical, Cultural and Environmental Heritage of the City of São Paulo (Conpresp) approved the project for the Silvio Santos towers.

In February 2020, Bill 805 of 2017, which called for the implementation of the Bixiga Park on the site where the residential towers would be erected, was unanimously approved in a second vote by the São Paulo City Council. In March, Eduardo Tuma, the city's acting mayor at the time, vetoed the project citing legal and financial issues. On December 19, 2023, the Public Prosecutor's Office and São Paulo City Hall announced that they would allocate R$51 million for the implementation of the Bixiga Park.

== See also ==
- Tourism in the city of São Paulo
