= Serviço Social do Comércio =

Brazilian non-profit private institution

- Abbreviation: Sesc
- Formation: 13 September 1946
- Location(s): Avenida Ayrton Senna, 5.555 - Jacarepaguá; Rio de Janeiro, RJ, Brazil
- Coordinates: 22.963333°S 43.358080°W
- Website: www.sesc.com.br

Serviço Social do Comércio (Portuguese: Social Service of Commerce), also known by the acronym SESC, is a Brazilian non-profit private institution, kept by businessmen in the trade of goods, services and tourism. It has operations in all Brazil, aimed primarily for the welfare of their employees and family but open to the general community.

SESC is part of the Sistema S (S System), a group of institutions created by Brazilian businessmen in the 1940s, such as SESI, SENAI and SENAC. It was created on 13 September 1946, by Decree-Law No. 9,853, issued by president Eurico Gaspar Dutra.

SESC operates in the education, health, leisure, culture and medical care areas, and is Brazil's leading institution in arts financing. Its revenue comes from a tax on companies that ranges from 0.2% to 2.5%.
