= Rouge discography =

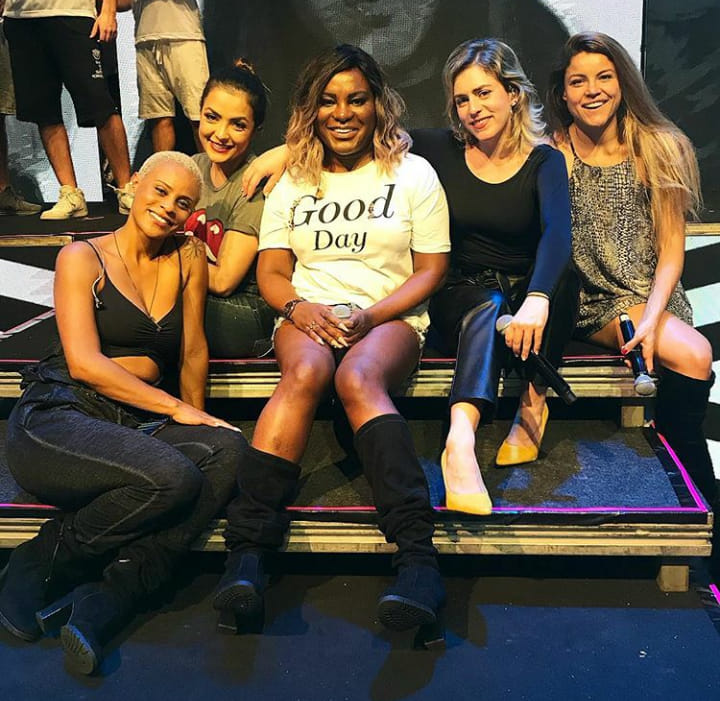
- Left to right: Aline Wirley, Li Martins, Karin Hils, Lu Andrade and Fantine Thó in 2018
- Studio albums: 5
- Extended plays: 1
- Compilation albums: 1
- Singles: 17
- Video albums: 3
- Music videos: 12
- Cancelled albums: 1

The discography of Brazilian girl group Rouge consists of four studio albums, one remix album, three DVDs and one cancelled album. The band has also released twelve official singles, two features and three promotional singles. In four years of career, they achieved four Gold, three Platinum and one Diamond album in Brazil and released various hit singles, becoming the most successful Brazilian girl group of all time. As of August 2010, the Rouge have sold approximately 6 million records.

== Albums ==
=== Studio albums ===
List of albums, with selected chart positions, sales, and certifications
Title	Album details	Peak chart positions	Sales	Certifications
Title	Album details	BRA	Sales	Certifications
Rouge	Released: 10 August 2002; Label: Columbia / Sony BMG; Formats: CD, digital download, streaming	1	BRA: 2,000,000	ABPD: 2× Platinum
C'est La Vie	Released: 6 May 2003; Label: Columbia / Sony BMG; Formats: CD, digital download, steaming	1	BRA: 900,000	ABPD: Platinum
Blá Blá Blá	Released: 16 July 2004; Label: Columbia / Sony BMG; Formats: CD, digital download, streaming	2	BRA: 600,000	ABPD: Gold
Mil e Uma Noites	Released: 30 May 2005; Label: Columbia / Sony BMG; Formats: CD, digital download, streaming	4	BRA: 250,000	ABPD: Gold
Les 5inq	Released: 1 February 2019; Label: Sony; Formats: CD, vinyl, digital download, streaming			

=== Extended Play (EP) ===
List of albums, with selected chart positions, sales, and certifications
Title	Album details
5	Released: 8 October 2018; Label: Sony BMG; Formats: EP, digital download

=== Remix albums ===
List of albums, with selected chart positions, sales, and certifications
Title	Album details	Sales
Rouge Remixes	Released: 2 February 2003; Label: Columbia / Sony BMG; Formats: CD, digital download	BRA: 150,000

=== Cancelled albums ===
Title	Reason
C'est La Vie en Español	The album would be released in 2003.; A version of the album "C'est La Vie" was recorded in Spanish.; But with the departure of the integral Luciana, the CD ended up being canceled.; The song "Um Anjo Veio Me Falar" had a Spanish version.

== Singles ==
List of singles
Title	Year	Album
"Não Dá pra Resistir"	2002	Rouge
"Nunca Deixe de Sonhar" (featuring KLB)	2002	Rouge
"Ragatanga"	2002	Rouge
"Beijo Molhado"	2003	Rouge
"Brilha La Luna"	2003	C'est La Vie
"Um Anjo Veio Me Falar"	2003	C'est La Vie
"Vem Cair na Zueira"	2003	C'est La Vie
"Blá Blá Blá"	2004	Blá Blá Blá
"Sem Você"	2004	Blá Blá Blá
"Pá Pá Lá Lá"	2004	Blá Blá Blá
"Vem Habib (Wala Wala)"	2005	Mil e Uma Noites
"O Amor é Ilusão"	2005	Mil e Uma Noites
"Bailando"	2018	Les 5inc
"Dona da Minha Vida"	2018	Les 5inc
"Solo Tu"	2019	Les 5inc

=== Promotional singles ===
Single	Year	Album
"Tudo É Rouge"	2013	Non-album song
"Tudo Outra Vez"	2013	Non-album song

== DVDs ==
List of albums, with selected chart positions, sales, and certifications
Title	Album details	Peak chart positions	Sales	Certifications
Title	Album details	BRA	Sales	Certifications
O Sonho de Ser Popstar	Released: 30 November 2002; Label: Columbia / Sony BMG; Formats: DVD	1	BRA: 300,000	ABPD: Platinum
C'est La Vie	Released: 2 August 2003; Label: Columbia / Sony BMG; Formats: CD + DVD	1	BRA: 500,000	ABPD: Platinum
A Festa dos Seus Sonhos	Released: 3 December 2003; Label: Columbia / Sony BMG; Formats: DVD	1	BRA: 600,000	ABPD: Platinum

== Music videos ==
Title	Year	Director(s)
"Não Dá pra Resistir"	2002	Pietro Sargentelli
"Nunca Deixe de Sonhar"	2002	Pietro Sargentelli
"Ragatanga"	2002	Pietro Sargentelli
"Brilha La Luna"	2003	Pietro Sargentelli
"Um Anjo Veio Me Falar"	2003	Alex Miranda e Ike Veit
"Un Angel Vive en Mi"	2003	Alex Miranda e Ike Veit
"Vem Cair na Zueira"	2003	Moacyr Góes
"Blá Blá Blá"	2004	Pietro Sargentelli
"Sem Você"	2004	Ike Veit
"Vem Habib (Wala Wala)"	2005	Karina Ades
"Bailando"	2018	Os Primos
"Confia em Mim"	2018	
"Dona da Minha Vida"	2018	Os Primos
