= Rouge 15 Anos =

2018 concert tour by Rouge

15 Anos
- Anniversary tour by Rouge
- Location: Brazil, South America
- Associated album: Rouge; C'est La Vie; Blá Blá Blá; Mil e Uma Noites
- Start date: January 27, 2018 (Fortaleza)
- End date: October 14, 2018 (São Paulo)
- Legs: 1
- No. of shows: 22

Rouge concert chronology
- Chá Rouge (2017–2022); 15 Anos (2018)

The Turnê 15 anos (transl. 15 Year Tour) is the headlining concert tour by Brazilian girl group Rouge, in celebration to the fifteen years of existence of the group, supporting all four releases: Rouge (2002), C'est La Vie (2003), Blá Blá Blá (2004) and Mil e Uma Noites (2005). It began on January 27, 2018, in Fortaleza, Ceará and concluded on August 11, 2018, in Recife, Pernambuco.

== Advertisement ==
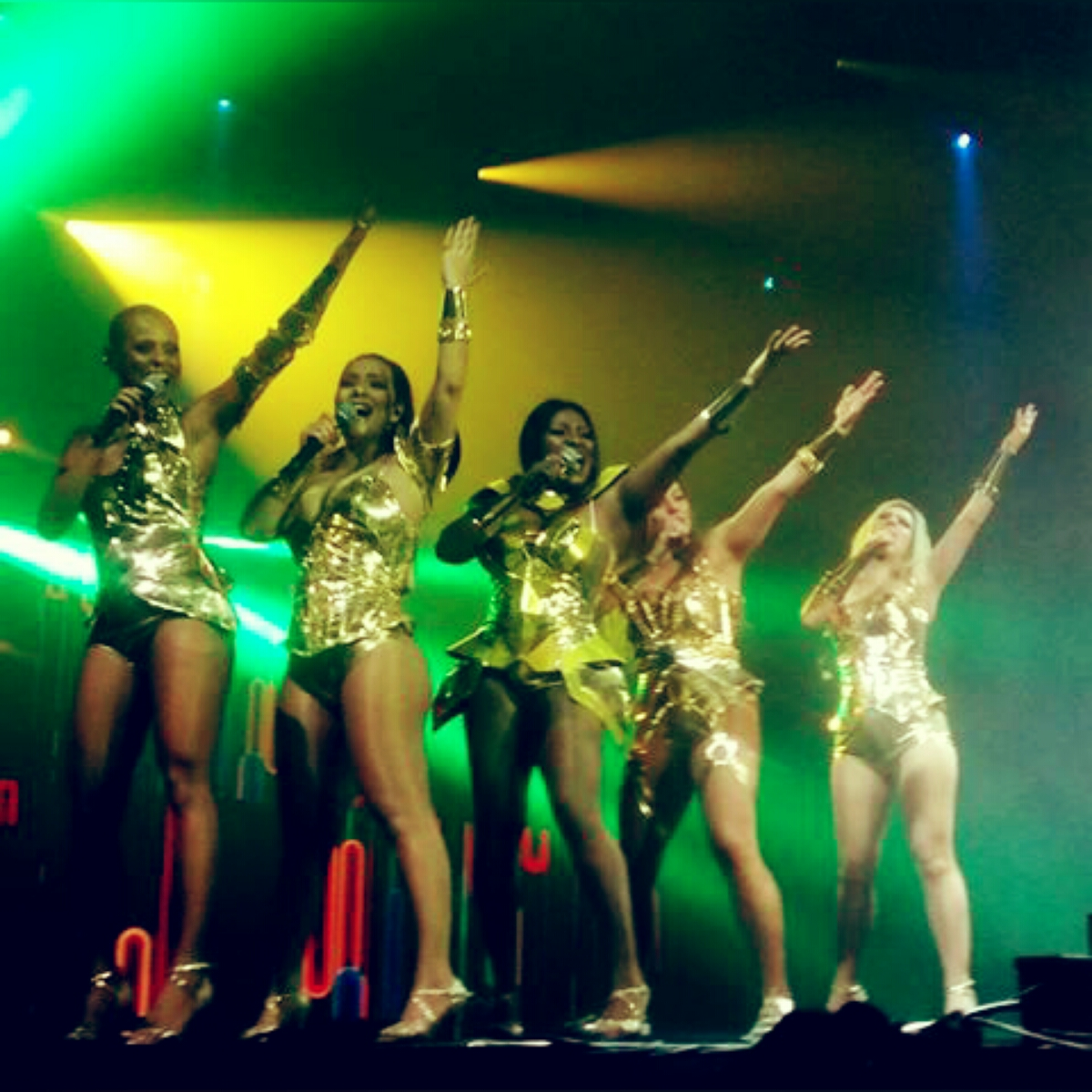
Rouge on '15 anos tour' in Fortaleza, Ceará in 2018.

On November 22, 2017, it was announced on the Blog Reporter Entre Linhas do Ceará newspaper The People that the Rouge will perform in Fortaleza in 2018, soon after the date of the show was announced for January 27, 2018. On December 5 the show was officially announced, being held at the Center of Events of Ceará, in addition to revealing the value of the tickets and the date of beginning of the sales.

Soon after the announcement of the show in Fortaleza, on December 7, the Rouge announced show in other three Brazilian cities, Florianópolis, Curitiba and Porto Alegre. In Florianópolis the group will perform at the Stage Music Park, on February 9 on Friday of Carnaval. In Curitiba the group will be performing at Live Curitiba on March 9. And in Porto Alegre will be presented on March 10 at Pepsi On Stage. On December 9, it was the turn to announce the Brasília show that will be held on March 24 at Net Live Brasília.

== Setlist ==
The repertoire below is constituted of the show done on February 10, 2018 in Florianópolis, not being representative of all the concerts.

1. "Blá Blá Blá"
2. "Bailando"
3. "Quero Estar Com Você"
4. "Fantasma"
5. "Eu Quero Acreditar"
6. "Não Dá pra Resistir"
7. "Beijo Molhado"
8. "1000 Segredos" / "Sou o Que Sou" / "Pá Pá Lá Lá" / "Depois Que Tudo Mudou"
9. "Cidade Triste"
10. "Um Anjo Veio Me Falar"
11. "Sem Você"
12. "Me Faz Feliz"
13. "C'est La Vie"
14. "Quando Chega a Noite"(Interlude)
15. "Vem Habib (Wala Wala)" (Interlude of "Baby Boy" by Beyoncé)
16. "Vem Cair na Zueira"
17. "Vem Dançar" (Interlude of "Wanna Be Startin' Somethin'" by Michael Jackson) / "Popstar" (Interlude of "Uptown Funk" by Mark Ronson and Bruno Mars)
18. "Tudo Outra Vez"
19. "Nunca Deixe de Sonhar"
20. "Hoje Eu Sei"
21. "Olha Só"
22. "O Que o Amor Me Faz"
23. "Brilha La Luna"
24. "Ragatanga"
25. "Bailando" (Reprise)
26. "Tudo é Rouge" (Outro)

== Shows ==
List of concerts, showing date, city, country, venue, opening acts, tickets sold, number of available tickets and amount of gross revenue
Date	City	Country	Venue	Opening acts	Attendance	Revenue
South America
January 27, 2018	Fortaleza	Brazil	Centro de Eventos do Ceará	—	—	—
February 2, 2018	Belo Horizonte	Brazil	KM de Vantagens Hall	—	—	—
February 9, 2018	Florianópolis	Brazil	Stage Music Park	—	—	—
March 9, 2018	Curitiba	Brazil	Live Curitiba	—	—	—
March 10, 2018	Porto Alegre	Brazil	Pepsi on Stage	—	—	—
March 24, 2018	Brasília	Brazil	NET Live Brasília	—	—	—
April 7, 2018	Vila Velha	Brazil	Shopping Vila Velha Events Arena	—	—	—
April 13, 2018	Manaus	Brazil	Pódium Arena da Amazônia	—	—	—
April 14, 2018	Belém	Brazil	Hangar Centro de Convenções	—	—	—
May 4, 2018	Rio de Janeiro	Brazil	Marina da Glória	—	—	—
May 20, 2018	São Paulo	Brazil	Vale do Anhangabaú	—	—	—
June 2, 2018	Salvador	Brazil	Vila Eco Bahia — Alto do Andu	—	—	—
June 22, 2018	Campinas	Brazil	Prime Hall	—	—	—
June 23, 2018	São José do Rio Preto	Brazil	Centro Regional de Eventos	—	—	—
June 29, 2018	Santo André	Brazil	Clube Aramaçan	—	—	—
June 30, 2018	Santos	Brazil	Capital Disco	—	—	—
July 21, 2018	São Paulo	Brazil	Espaço das Américas	—	—	—
August 4, 2018	Sorocaba	Brazil	Clube Recreativo Campestre	—	—	—
August 11, 2018	Recife	Brazil	Clube Português	—	—	—
October 14, 2018	São Paulo	Brazil	Allianz Park	—	—	—

== Cancelled dates ==
Date	City	Venue
February 13, 2018 (Note: Exclusive presentation Camarote Tribus in the Barra-Ondina circuit of the Bahian Carnival de 2018)	Salvador	Camarote Tribus
February 10, 2018	Joinville	Yelo Stage
June 9, 2018	São José dos Campos	Pálacio Sunset
May 26, 2018	Goiânia	Atlanta Music Hall
