= Mil e Uma Noites =

Studio album by Rouge
- Released: May 30, 2005
- Recorded: 2002–05
- Genres: Pop; dance-pop
- Length: 51:29
- Labels: Columbia; Sony BMG
- Producer: Rick Bonadio

Rouge chronology
Blá Blá Blá (2004)	Mil e Uma Noites (2005)	Les 5inq (2019)

Singles from Mil e Uma Noites
- 1. "Vem Habib (Wala Wala)" Released: May 23, 2005; 2. "O Amor é Ilusão" Released: September 27, 2005

Mil e Uma Noites (English: One Thousand and One Nights) is the fourth studio album and the first greatest hits album of Brazilian pop girl group Rouge, released on May 30, 2005, by Sony BMG. The work is a mix of new tracks and a greatest hits compilation, including "Ragatanga", "Brilha La Luna" and "Blá Blá Blá". Previously unreleased songs were "Me Leva Contigo", "Mais Uma Da Lista", "Cidade Triste", "Onde Está O Amor?", "O Amor é Ilusão" and the lead single "Vem Habib (Wala Wala)", and a bonus acoustic version of the hit "Um Anjo Veio Me Falar". The album sold more than 50,000 copies in Brazil.

== Background ==
"We realized that there is a moment in the life of every artist, that he records an album as Greatest Hits and we already thought of doing it before. We combined the great hits, with six unreleased songs and recorded this fourth studio album, adding the useful to the pleasant. The name Mil e Uma Noites (Thousand and One Nights) is because we are celebrating a thousand and one nights of success, career."

After releasing three albums, the girls wanted their new album to have only new songs, but the record company wanted a compilation album. For Rouge, to have new songs at that moment (2005) was a way to prove to the public and the press that the group did not end, as was speculated. The rumors, according to Patrícia Lissa, started because the quartet was living a transition period since 2004, when it left the producer RGB and were signed to Arsenal (Rick Bonadio) after Luciana Andrade's departure. Also, their last album was not as successful as their first two albums. In addition, their label, Sony Music, merged with BMG.

This all moved us a lot. We were on hold for six months, all a little lost, waiting for what would happen. We were told that we would pursue solo careers. We did some things on our own, but the group did not end.

"Today many people respect us and do not see us as a laboratory band, a disposable product, made to sell millions of a single disc, give money to many people and then disappear," she says. After the discussion about the fate of the album, Mil e Uma Noites became a compilation and an album of new songs in a single album. The format of the album was the form found by the girls to reconcile their interests with those of the record company.

== Songs ==
"It was to leave a compilation album with a maximum of three unpublished tracks, as with every artist who already has two or three albums released. We did not want to, At first we hit the record company, because we were already seeing new songs for an upcoming album But then we saw that they were right, we were able to put in six new tracks, which for us was an asset".

Of the 14 tracks on the CD, the fourth and last in the career of Patricia, Aline, Karin and Fantine, six are new. The remaining eight songs are hits taken from previous albums, including an acoustic version unheard of for the hit "Um Anjo Veio Me Falar."

The first working track of Mil e Uma Noites is "Vem Habib (Wala Wala)", one of six unpublished songs from the album. Maintaining the group's proposal - dance melody, relaxed lyrics and children's appeal - the song was compared to "Ralando o Tchan (Dança do Ventre)", by the group É o Tchan, for the Arab theme. But according to Patrícia, references to the song were Rich Girl, released by No Doubt vocalist Gwen Stefani on her solo album Love. Angel. Music. Baby. (2004) And "Whenever, Wherever," Shakira's hit. Another highlight is the version for the song "Torn", of Natalie Imbruglia, that became "O Amor é Ilusão", written by songwriter Milton Guedes.

== Critical reception ==
Professional ratings
Review scores
Source	Rating
Universo Musical	Positive

The reviewer Bruno Nogueira from Folhapé praised the album, arguing, "They continue to show what they have tasted in the Popstars program marathon: they are voices capable of delivering hits when they are well disciplined." Mil e Uma Noites variation is fine enjoyable, except probably for the very working music that invests too much in the sounds of the Middle East appropriated by Rede Globo in the novel O Clone. guitar and melodies that oscillate between the melancholic and the agitated, depending on the point of view that one wants to give the central theme, love. Without detracting from the original part of Bonadio's work, the high point is really the versions. is an "O Amor é Ilusão", the interesting "Não Dá pra Resistir" appear, and "Um Anjo Veio Me Falar", in an acoustic version.

In addition to the release on television, the girls also performed all over Brazil, in what became the band's last tour, The Mil e Uma Noite Tour, in 2005. The group also made a special appearance in Band's Floribella, singing the single "Vem Habib (Wala Wala)" and the success "Um Anjo Veio Me Falar".

== Singles ==
The first single from the album, "Vem Habib (Wala Wala)" was released on May 23, 2005, on Brazilian radio stations. His music video was recorded in the desert on June 3 and premiered on June 16 on MTV. The second and last single of the album, "O Amor é Ilusão", was released at the end of September 2005.

== Track listing ==
All songs producer by Rick Bonadio
No.	Title	Writer(s)	Length
1.	"Me Leva Contigo" (I Want You to Want Me)	Max Martin; Jacob Schulze; Milton Guedes (portuguese version)	3:36
2.	"Vem Habib (Wala Wala)"	Rick Bonadio	3:33
3.	"Mais Uma Da Lista" (Blacklisted)	Niclas Kings; Niklas Bergwall; Jeanette Olsson; Guedes (portuguese version)	3:44
4.	"Cidade Triste" (Sleepy City)	Rampac; Jos Jorgensen; Clio (portuguese version)	4:19
5.	"O Amor é Ilusão" (Torn)	Anne Preven; Phil Thornalley; Scott Cutler; Guedes (portuguese version)	4:06
6.	"Onde Está o Amor?" (Where Are You Now?)	Eric Silver; Bonadio; Clio (portuguese version)	3:51
7.	"Não Dá pra Resistir (Irresistible)" (from Rouge)	Kara Dioguardi; Fredrik Thomander; Anders Wikstrom; Guedes (portuguese version)	2:57
8.	"Brilha La Luna" (from C'est La Vie)	Bonadio	3:30
9.	"Beijo Molhado (Strawberry Kisses)" (from Rouge)	Andy Marvel; Jeff Franzel; Marjorie Maye; Guedes (portuguese version)	3:30
10.	"Ragatanga (Aserejé)" (from Rouge)	Francisco Manuel Ruiz Gomez; Bonadio (portuguese version)	3:22
11.	"Blá Blá Blá" (from Blá Blá Blá)	Bonadio; Fúlvio Márcio	3:59
12.	"Vem Cair na Zueira" (from C'est La Vie)	Bonadio	3:24
13.	"Hoje Eu Sei (Just Another Day)" (from Rouge)	Franne Golde; Guy Roche; Jeanette Jurado; Bonadio (portuguese version)	4:13
14.	"Um Anjo Veio Me Falar (Angel In My Heart) (acoustic version)" (from C'est La Vie)	Eliot Kennedy; Tim Woodcock; Suzanne Shaw; Bonadio; Fantine Thó; Li Martins; Aline Wirley; Karin Hils; Luciana Andrade (portuguese version)	3:45
Total length:			51:29
