= Sem Você =

Single by Rouge

from the album Blá Blá Blá
- Released: August 2, 2004
- Recorded: 2004
- Genre: Pop rock
- Length: 3:59
- Label: Columbia; Sony
- Songwriters: Andrés Constantinidis; Carolina de La Muela; Rick Bonadio
- Producer: Rick Bonadio

Rouge singles chronology
"Blá Blá Blá" (2004)	"Sem Você" (2004)	"Pá Pá Lá Lá" (2004)

Music video
- "Sem Você" on YouTube

"Sem Você" (lit.: "Without You") is a song by the Brazilian girl group pop Rouge, from their fourth studio album, Blá Blá Blá (2004). The song was written in Spanish by Andrés Constantinidis and Carolina de La Muela, with the title "No Dejo de Sentir", and was translated and produced by Rick Bonadio. The song is a pop rock ballad, which talks about not being able to live without the loved one. The song released on August 2, 2004.

"Sem Você" was inserted as a soundtrack to SBT's soap opera Esmeralda, which helped popularize the song. The song was promoted in numerous TV shows. The group have performed the song on their for tours, from the Blá Blá Blá Tour (2004), Mil e Uma Noites Tour (2005), Chá Rouge Tour (2017) and 15 Anos Tour (2018).

== Composition and lyrics ==
"Sem Você" is a pop ballad, with strong presence of distorted guitars in its sonorization, which gives a more pop rock feature to the song. Written in Spanish by Andrés Constantinidis and Carolina de La Muela, with the title "No Dejo de Sentir", and translated and produced by Rick Bonadio. "Sem Você" talks about finding love, and not being able to live without the loved one.

The song begins with Li Martins singing that never thought to find someone to love, but that when seeing the person loved, the world of her changed. In the chorus, everyone sings as "second voice," while Patricia has more vocal highlights, "And now I can not stop feeling, without you and I can not breathe, I do not want to live if you're not here with me, I can not be happy," they sing the girls. The second part is sung by Karin Hils, and talks about love seem like a dream come true. The second chorus brings Fantine Thó in the lead vocals, while the other girls do "second voice". The bridge of the song brings Aline Wirley talking that she needs this love in her life, to be happy. After the last refrain, the girls do "harmony."

== Music video ==
On August 24, 2004, MTV Brasil premiered the music video for "Sem Você", directed by Ike Veitna. The scenes were recorded in the living room of a house, located in Morumbi, in São Paulo. The new video shows Fantine, Li Martins, Aline Wirley and Karin Hils in various situations. Ike had the idea of positioning the camera in the middle of the room, to be rotating throughout the clip in order to capture all the images.

== Usage and performance ==
"Sem Você" was inserted as a soundtrack to SBT's soap opera Esmeralda, like theme of the pair Graziella (Karina Barum) and Adrian (Daniel Andrade). The song was promoted in numerous TV programs. "Sem Você" was also part of the tour's set-list, Blá Blá Blá Tour (2004), Mil e Uma Noites Tour (2005), Chá Rouge Tour (2017) and 15 Anos Tour (2018).

== Charts ==
Chart (2004)	Peak position
Brazil (Brasil Hot 100 Airplay)	4
Latin America (Hispanic America Top 40 Chart)	37
