= Blá Blá Blá (song) =

Single by Rouge

from the album Blá Blá Blá
- Released: May 4, 2004
- Recorded: 2004
- Genre: Pop rock
- Length: 3:59
- Label: Columbia; Sony
- Songwriter: Rick Bonadio
- Producer: Rick Bonadio

Rouge singles chronology
| "Vem Cair na Zueira" (2003) | "Blá Blá Blá" (2004) | "Sem Você" (2004) |

Music video
- "Blá Blá Blá" on YouTube

"Blá Blá Blá" is a song by the Brazilian girl group pop Rouge, and the lead single from her third studio album of the same name. The song was written and produced by Rick Bonadio, and became the girls' first song without the vocals of Luciana Andrade, who left the group in February 2004. It was released by Columbia Records on May 4, 2004.

"Blá Blá Blá" has a dominant pop rock style, where the girls sing in a more aggressive tone about the rumors that the media have invented about them. Aline Wirley, just like in the previous single, "Vem Cair na Zueira", makes a rap in the song. The music video also shows the group's more "somber" look, also showing the evolution of the girls. The clip was also nominated for MTV Video Music Brasil 2004. The song was promoted in numerous TV programs. The group have performed the song on their tours, from the Blá Blá Blá Tour (2004), Mil e Uma Noites Tour (2005), Chá Rouge Tour (2017) and 15 Anos Tour (2018).

== Background ==
After the success of their second studio album, C'est La Vie (2003), on February 11, 2004, Luciana Andrade officially announced her disbandment from the group. "Nothing in life is just roses. There's a moment that we need to change. I felt this very strong these times. I'm at peace with my decision. Each one follows their road", she said. According to sources, the singer left the band due to overworking —there were days the girls had a 20-hour schedule— and low payment. As for others, including by the singer herself, her departure "was a matter of musical ideology. There came a time when her work in the group wasn't fulfilling her wishes", the singer's husband said. "Rouge will go on with four energy-filled girls," affirmed Elisabetta Zenatti, their manager. "It's a big change. Rouge is one. You can't introduce a new member. This reflects in our work. We chose to continue our history as well", Fantine Thó added.

== Composition and lyrics ==
=== Musical structure and influences ===
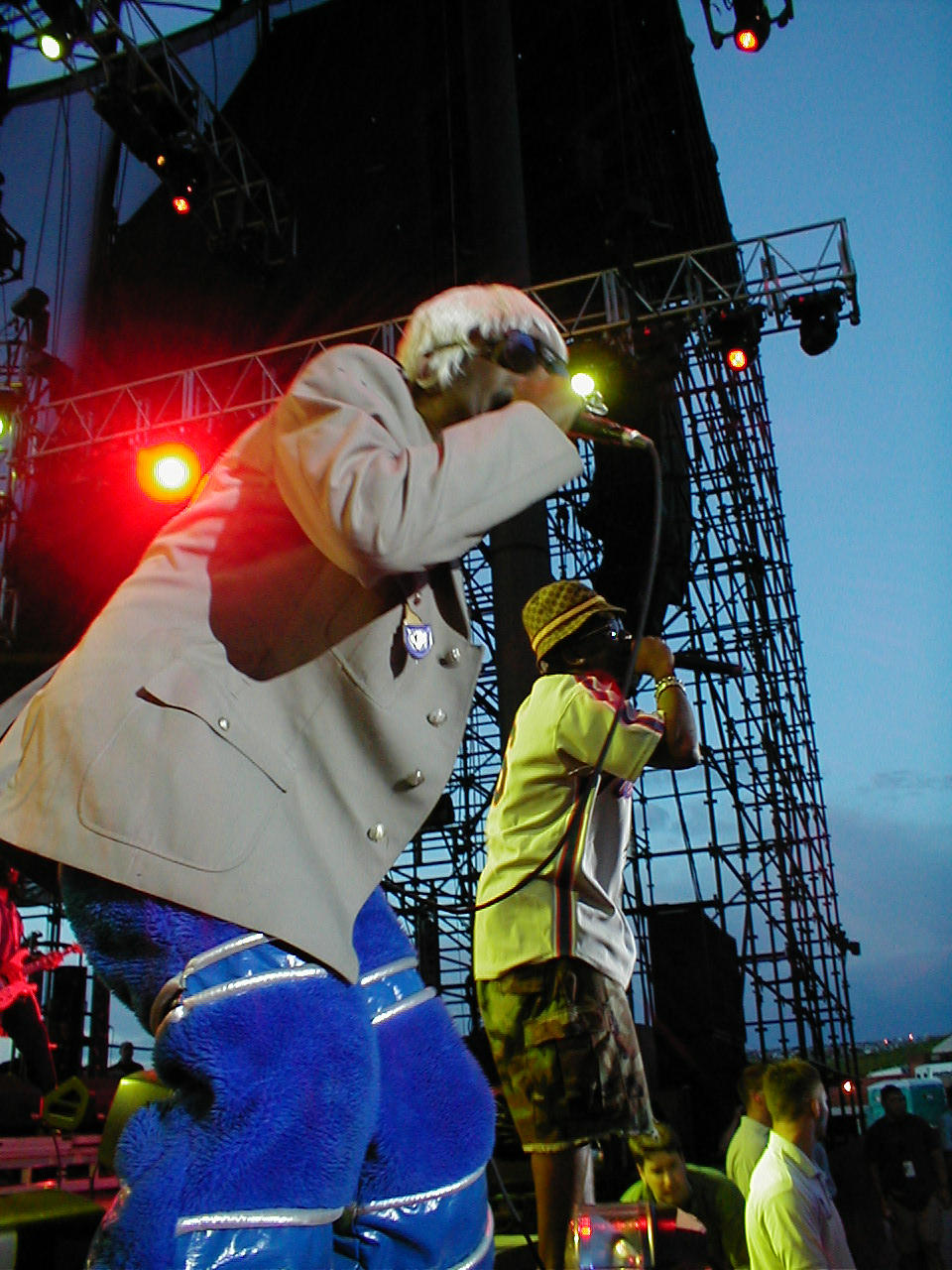
According to Rick Bonadio, the song has influences from the band "Outkast" (photo).

"It's really a daring song, it's not an easy song, we felt we could not make a song that was a repetition of what had already been done." It could not be more dance-centric, as "Ragatanga" was, or something more playful, like was "Brilha La Luna"."

"Blá Blá Blá" has a dominant pop rock style, where the girls sing in a more aggressive tone about the rumors that the media have invented about them. Producer Rick Bonadio explained how he composed the song: "When I started composing the structure, I thought of a Broadway musical type that allows the performance of the girls to be well explored. It starts very calm and quiet, with a solo by Patrícia and a beautiful vocal arrangement. Then it changes: it's half black, half dance, it grows on a pop-filled chorus of astral, it comes a rap and finally it ends up returning to the climate of the beginning.In terms of sonority, it has a little influence of Outkast, which is a group that changed the face of the pop scene," points out Bonadio.

And when Rick showed us the song for the first time, we were a little surprised, we thought, "Maybe it's too different." Fantine says, "The arrangements of our songs have always been complex and complicated. elaborate, but rather were more angelic, delicate. In the new disc, they have more weight and footprint, the sound comes more full, with certain aggressiveness and attitude".

=== Lyrical interpretation ===
"Blá Blá Blá" was written and produced by Rick Bonadio, and brings a more aggressive style, as much in its letter, as in its style, derived from pop rock. "Blá Blá Blá" reflects Luciana's departure from the group, and "attacks" the tabloids, who did not waste time in criticizing them, saying that the group would end after the departure of a member.

The song begins with Patricia singing, in a cappella, about someone who insists on knowing everything in life, and wants to show her the right way to go. But the singer says, "As an illusion, I will not believe it, I'll let the story happen." After that, a strong beat starts, and Karin sings how life is like a journey, saying that she does not know the time to leave or arrive, and that she will let time show. Soon after, Fantine "attacks" stronger the "people" who talk about what they do not know (probably an indirect one to all that said that the real reason for leaving Luciana, was a fight involving both).

In the "pre-chorus," they sing, "na na na na na", and Fantine "screams", "And everyone wants to talk". In the chorus, the girls sing, "Lenga lenga, Blá! Blá! Blá !, speak, talk, nonstop, lero-lero !, blah! Blah !, I do not want to hear." Karin once again sings in the second part, talking about "nosy people" that appeared, just to get in their way. Fantine, in turn, says, "I'm right, I'm wrong, let time show me, but no one's going to tell me what I should do." After the chorus, Aline does a rap (as she did in the song "Vem Cair na Zueira",) this time talking about how strong they are, giving advice and lessons, saying that with them gossip does not stick, "[... ] Our firm is strong, does not shake does not fall, does not have glass ceiling, our house does not fall, "Aline sings. At the end of the song, the girls make a sign of silence, and at the end, a solo piano is heard, closing the song.

== Music video ==
Like music, the music video has a similar theme, full of paparazzi and all the media trying to take pictures of them. The video also brought the quartet with sexier clothes, showing a more mature side of the girls. The music video received a 2004 MTV Video Music Brasil nomination in the Viewer’s Choice category, but lost to Pitty with the "Admirável Chip Novo" video.

== Release and promotion ==
"Blá Blá Blá" was released on the radio on May 4, 2004. The song was still part of the SBT's soap opera Seus Olhos (2004). "Blá Blá Blá" was also part of the setlist of the tours, Blá Blá Blá Tour (2004), Mil e Uma Noites Tour (2005), Chá Rouge Tour (2017) and 15 Anos Tour (2018).

== Track listings ==
CD Single

1. "Blá Blá Blá"
2. "Blá Blá Blá" (Radio Edit)
3. "Blá Blá Blá" (Drum Mix)

== Awards ==
| Year | Awards ceremony | Award | Results |
|---|---|---|---|
| 2003 | MTV Video Music Brasil | Audience Selection | Nominated |

== Charts ==
| Chart (2004) | Peak position |
|---|---|
| Brazil (Brasil Hot 100 Airplay) | 2 |
| Latin America (World Latin Top 30 Singles) | 21 |
