= Blá Blá Blá =

Studio album by Rouge
- Released: May 26, 2004
- Recorded: February – April 2004
- Genre: Pop rock; dance-pop
- Length: 43:55
- Label: Columbia; Sony BMG
- Producer: Rick Bonadio

Rouge chronology
| A Festa dos Seus Sonhos (2003) | Blá Blá Blá (2004) | Mil e Uma Noites (2005) |

Singles from Blá Blá Blá
- 1. "Blá Blá Blá" Released: May 4, 2004; 2. "Sem Você" Released: July 31, 2004; 3. "Pá Pá Lá Lá" Released: November 27, 2004

Blá Blá Blá is the third studio album by Brazilian girl group Rouge. It was released by Columbia Records and Sony BMG on May 26, 2004. The project marked Rouge's first studio release as a quartet after the departure of original member Luciana Andrade, who later rejoined the group in fifth album Les 5inq in 2019. The remaining four members reteamed with frequent producer musical collaborator Rick Bonadio.

Blá Blá Blá is predominately a pop album with slight elements of dance-pop, pop rock and gospel music, marking a departure from the zouk-oriented sound of previous project; its lyrics explore themes of heartbreak, love, fans, and escapism. After having few to no writing credits on their previous two studio albums, in Blá Blá Blá brings the members of the group, Fantine Thó and Karin Hils, taking on the writing of some songs with different array of collaborators, including Bonadio, Fúlvio Márcio, Clio, Beto Paciello and Milton Guedes. The album features versions of three songs previously released by other artists, plus four songs composed in English and the group's record company, Sony Music, brought the group to record with exclusivity.

From the album, four singles were taken: the title track and "Sem Você" reached the top five on the Brazilian Charts. It sold more than 100,000 copies and was eventually certified gold by the Pro-Música Brasil (PMB). To promote the album, the group embarked on the Tour Blá Blá Blá (2004–2005).

== Background ==
After the success of Rouge's second album, C'est La Vie (2003), on February 11, 2004, Luciana Andrade officially announced her disbandment from the group. "Nothing in life is just roses. There's a moment that we need to change. I felt this very strong these times. I am in peace with my decision. Each one will follow its own road", she said. According to sources, the singer left the band due to overworking — there were days the girls had a 20-hour schedule — and low payment. She revealed, in an interview years later, her departure was due to mobbing committed by manager and low pay. Elisabetta Zenatti, manager of the group, says: "Rouge will go on with four energy-filled girls". Fantine Thó added: "Rouge is one. You can't introduce a new member. This reflects in our work. We chose to continue our history".

== Conception and production ==
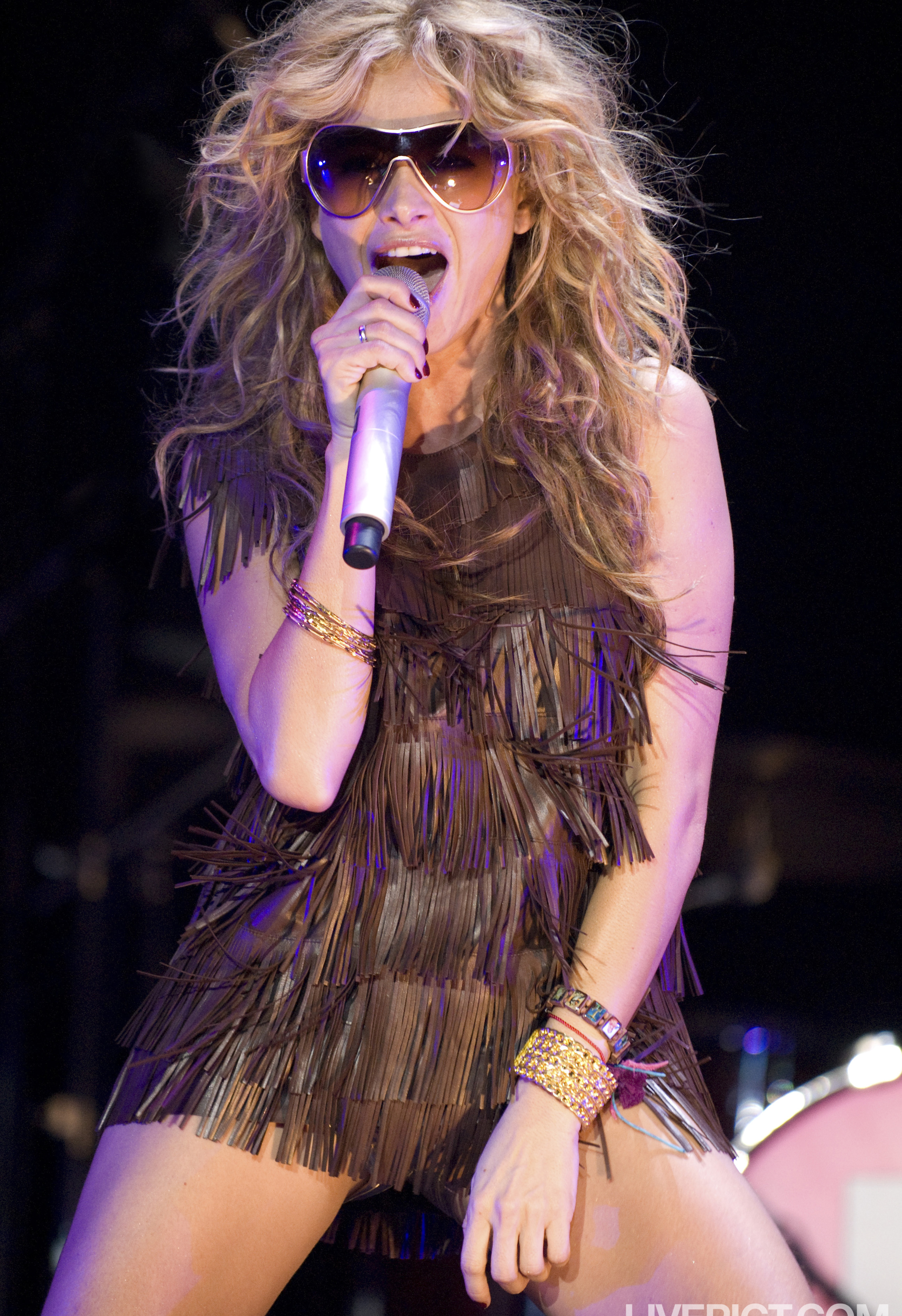
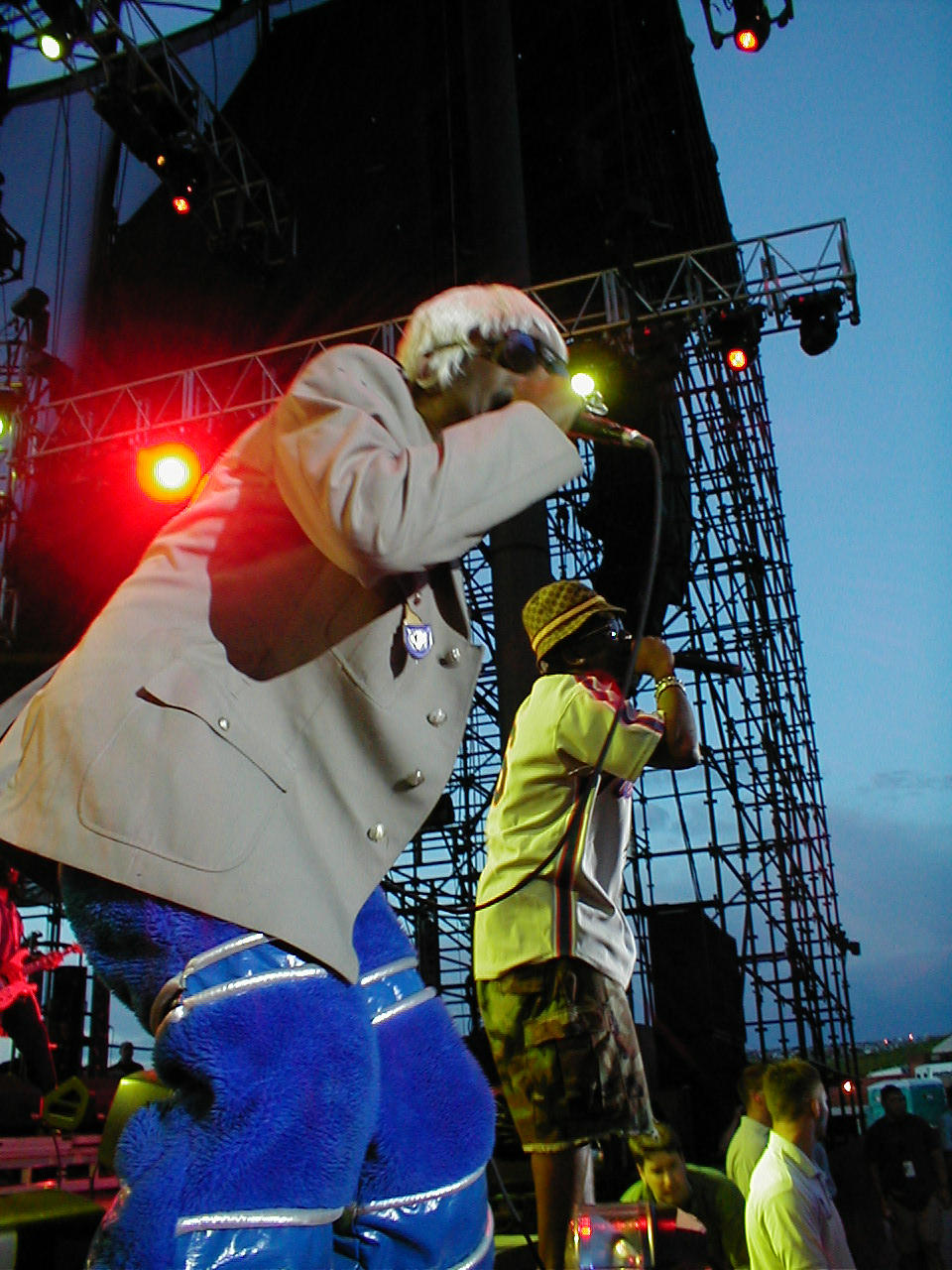
The album features "Pá Pá Lá Lá", version for the Mexican singer Paulina Rubio's track "Algo tienes" (left), while the track "Blá Blá Blá" has influences of the American group Outkast (right).

After the Andrade's departure, the group announced during the same press conference, that between May and June the relense band's third album: "The group will come back renewed, with new ballads and new concepts of shows", said Zenatti. After February, the group slowed down to recording on the new album and music videos. Patrícia Lissa said: "Andrade will not have any contribution in the third album, which means that we will have to work hard, but the group will not lose quality with her departure".

Blá Blá Blá is a pop rock and dance-pop mix with elements of different genres and with more mature lyrics; marking a departure from the teen pop and zouk-oriented sound of previous projects. Thó commented: "It's still pop, but it's more connected to the roots of influences. "Eu Quero Acreditar" and "Se Liga Se Toca" is pop rock, "Filme de Terror" is hardcore and "Na Palma da Mão" is a afrobeat". The latter, by the way, is authored by the band itself, and the first composition to be recorded by Rouge on an album. Aline Wirley told "It was a joke at Karin Hils's house, we did not do it with the intention of recording". The responsibility for recording the first composition was not born by the group. Thó told "We really trust our producer (Rick Bonadio), and he knows he would not let anything go that was not good".

When talking about the song "Blá Blá Blá", Bonadio commented: "It really is very daring, it's not an easy song, we felt like we could not make a song that was a repetition of what had already been done. More focused on dance, like "Ragatanga", nor anything more playful, as it was "Brilha La Luna"." Karin Hils further elaborated: "We really wanted to do something different, and when Rick showed us the song for the first time, we were a little surprised, we thought, 'maybe it's too different'. In terms of sonority, there is a bit of Outkast influence".

According to Lissa: "I wrote the ballad's "Pra Sempre Te Amar", which was born with only voice and guitar. I gave Bonadio the arrangement and he made the music much better". Thó continued: "On the third's album, the four of us wrote together a song called "Na Palma da Mão", a funsion of dance, ragga and hip hop music". Wirley explained: "We met at Hils's house to eat pizza and the music came out, kind of jokingly. The letter puts us up the hill and inviting people to a party, has a joke with palms, is very fun". According to Bonadio: "The quality of the Rouge's vocals is increasing, as is the track "Por Onde Quer Que Eu Vá", in which the girls do a thank-you, a tribute to the fans, it's a ballad with gospel elements, with incredible vocals".

== Critical reception ==
Professional ratings
Review scores
| Source | Rating |
|---|---|
| Universo Musical | Positive |

The musical review by Universo Musical was positive. An editor saying that "In their third studio album, the members of the Rouge debut new line-up, without Andrade. The remaining Karin, Fantine, Aline and Patricia report the message, recording an album of more mature lyrics, although the target is still the teen audience and the children and adolescents. They also improve in terms of rhythm, adding pitches of rock to their dance-pop, as in "Blá Blá Blá" (first track of album, which speaks of gossip), "Eu Quero Acreditar", "Se Liga, Se Toca", "Como na Primeira Vez" and "Filme de Terror". In the balads, highlight to "Vermelho, A Cor do Amor", with beautiful lyrics and a great strings's arrangement. But the very best is for the final: the last track, "Por Onde Quer Que Eu Vá", with the four members, who usually sing lonely, singing together in a beautiful choir, in a tribute to the fans."

== Track listing ==
All songs producer by Rick Bonadio
| No. | Title | Writer(s) | Length |
|---|---|---|---|
| 1. | "Blá Blá Blá" | Rick Bonadio; Fúlvio Márcio | 3:59 |
| 2. | "Eu Quero Acreditar" (Got to Believe) | Brian Steckler; Fredrik Järnberg; Pontus Wennerberg; Milton Guedes (portuguese version) | 3:29 |
| 3. | "Vermelho, A Cor do Amor" (Red) | Eric Silver; Stephanie Bentley; Bonadio; Clio (portuguese version) | 3:36 |
| 4. | "Pá Pá Lá Lá" (Algo tienes) | Manny Benito; Chris Rodriguez; Bonadio (portuguese version) | 3:10 |
| 5. | "Vem Dançar" (Let's Dance) | Axel Breitung; Delta Goodrem; Mark Holden; Aline Wirley; Fantine Thó; Karin Hils; Patrícia Lissa; Guedes (portuguese version) | 3:50 |
| 6. | "Se Liga, Se Toca" (Chooza Looza) | Aron Friedman; David Thomas; Keith Beauvais; Niklas Petterson; Simon Perry; Maria Willson; Guedes (portuguese version) | 3:26 |
| 7. | "Sem Você" (No Dejo de Sentir) | Andrés Constantinidis; Carolina de la Muela; Bonadio (portuguese version) | 3:27 |
| 8. | "Na Palma da Mão" (Bombastic) | Aline; Fantine; Mônica Telles; Hils; Lissa; Bonadio | 3:52 |
| 9. | "Como na Primeira Vez" (No More Violins) | Aleena; Anders Wollbeck; Mattias Lindblom; Guedes (portuguese version) | 4:03 |
| 10. | "Pra Sempre Te Amar" | Thó; Hils | 3:26 |
| 11. | "Filme de Terror" | Bonadio; Márcio | 3:02 |
| 12. | "Por Onde Quer Que Eu Vá" | Bonadio; Beto Paciello | 7:15 |
| Total length: | | | 43:55 |

== Certifications ==
| Region | Certification | Certified units/sales |
|---|---|---|
| Brazil (Pro-Música Brasil) | Gold | 100,000^{*} |
^{*} Sales figures based on certification alone.

== See also ==
- List of best-selling girl group albums in Brazil
