= Karin Hils =

Brazilian actress, singer and songwriter (born 1979)

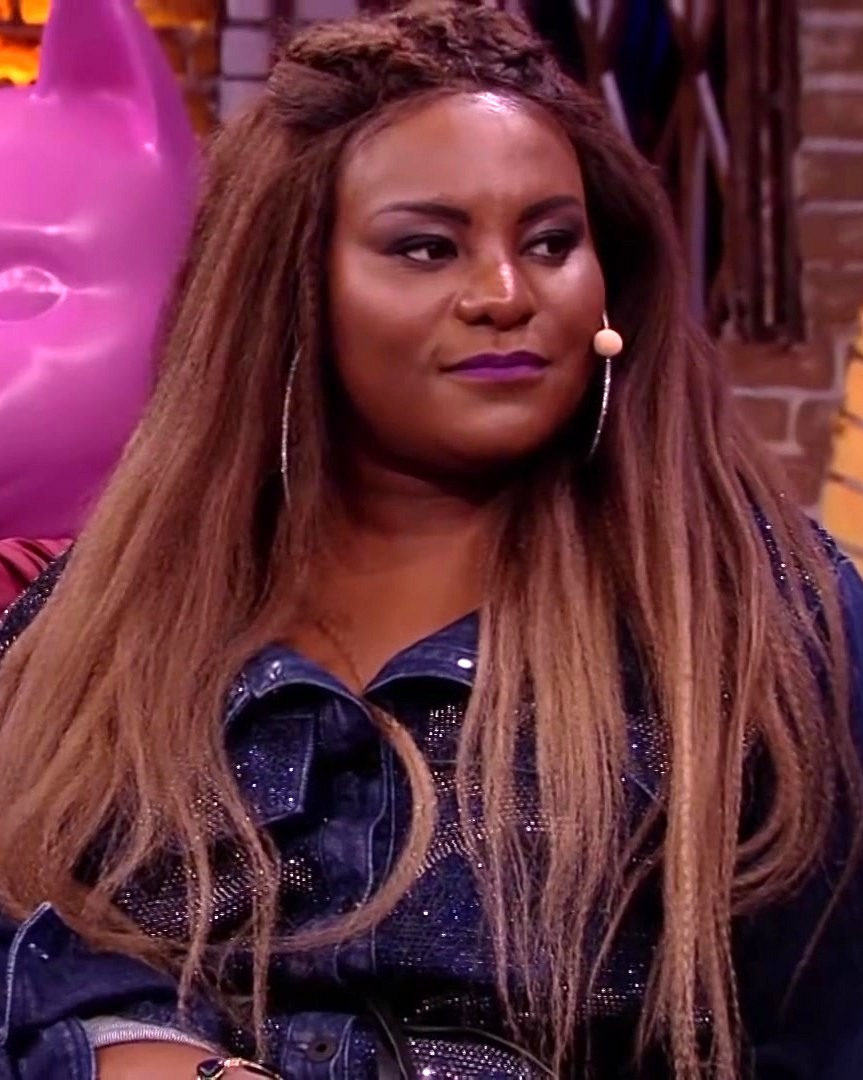
- Hils in 2018
- Born: Karin Pereira de Souza; 7 February 1979 (age 47); Paracambi, Rio de Janeiro, Brazil
- Occupations: Actress; singer
- Television: Popstars; Aquele Beijo; Pé na Cova; Sexo e as Negas; Carinha de Anjo
- Musical career
- Genres: Pop; R&B
- Instrument: Vocals
- Years active: 2002–present
- Labels: Columbia; Sony BMG
- Formerly of: Rouge
- Website: karinhils.com

Karin Pereira de Souza (born 7 February 1979), known professionally as Karin Hils, is a Brazilian actress, singer and songwriter. In 2002, she won the talent show Popstars and joined the Brazilian girl group Rouge until 2005, with which she released four studio albums, Rouge (2002), C'est La Vie (2003), Blá Blá Blá (2004) and Mil e Uma Noites (2005), selling in all 6 million copies and becoming best-seller Brazilian girl group.

She gained prominence as an actress when starring several musicals in the theater, like in 2009 Hairspray, Emoções Baratas, Alô, Dolly!, Xanadu and Mudança de Hábito, besides starring in the serial television Pé na Cova and Sexo e Negas. In 2016, she returned to the SBT to integrate the cast of the telenovela Carinha de Anjo, interpreting the fun and confused nun, Sister Fabiana.

== Career ==
=== 2002–06: Rouge ===
In 2002 Karin enrolled in the talent show Popstars, being selected from 30 thousand enrolled for the second phase of the program, where more than 6 thousand were classified in the Anhembi Sambadrome, São Paulo, where they performed song evaluation. In the following phases, the jurors became more and more demanding, in this way, selecting for the next stages only the girls who really were able to face the career of popstar. After 5 qualifying rounds, only 8 girls were classified for the final stage that took place at the home of the Popstars. After the 6th and final eliminatory phase, the Brazilian girl group was finally formed by Fantine Thó, Li Martins, Luciana Andrade, Aline Wirley and Karin. In the same year was released the first studio album, the homonym Rouge, reaching the first position and selling around 2 million copies, receiving the certificate of diamond by Brazilian Association of Record Producers (ABPD). His Lead single was "Não Dá para Resistir" followed by "Ragatanga", track with special participation of Spanish girl group Las Ketchup, in addition to "Beijo Molhado" and "Nunca Deixe de Sonhar." Also the group released the remix album titled Rouge Remixes, selling 150 thousand copies, receiving certificate of gold, and the video album O Sonho de Ser Uma Popstar, bringing its first show.

In 2003 the group released the second studio album, C'est La Vie, selling around 100,000 copies in the first week of release and around 1 million copies in total, bringing as singles "Brilha La Luna", "Um Anjo Veio Me Falar" and "Vem Cair na Zueira". On 3 December is released the second record of concerts of the group on DVD, titled A Festa dos Seus Sonhos. On 11 February 2004 Luciana announced that she was leaving the group, claiming the lack of identification with the most dance-pop sound that the group was taking. After the departure of Luciana, the four remaining members continued and released the albums Blá Blá Blá (2004) and Mil e Uma Noites (2005). The group split definitively in June 2006, when the contract with Sony Music expired and was not renewed. Over four years, the group sold about 6 million records, becoming the most successful female group in Brazil, and received in all, two gold certification, two platinum certification, one double platinum certification and one diamond certification by ABPD.

=== 2006–present: Career as an actress ===
Between 2006 and 2008 Karin tried to present for some record companies a project for an album, not obtaining success in obtaining a contract. In 2008 it became backing vocal of the rapper Tulio Dek, also recording the vocals of support in its studio album O Que Se Leva da Vida É a Vida Que Se Leva. In 2009 the producer Rick Bonadio began to work with her in its debut album, that would be released by Midas Music and focused in the R&B, bringing also the participation of some rappers. The album ended up never being released and no band released, giving no reasons for the happened thing. In the same year, focusing on the career of actress, made its debut in the musical theatre in the musical Hairspray, also happening in 2010 by the reassembly of Emoções Baratas. In the same year it gained prominence as the personage Dionne in Hair. After meeting Miguel Falabella behind the scenes of the shows, he was invited by him to join the telenovela Aquele Beijo in 2011, making her debut on television. In 2012 it was the turn to give life to Ensemble, the musical Alô, Dolly! and, soon after, Thalia of the classic Xanadu. In 2013 joined the cast of the series television Pé na Cova, Rede Globo, playing Soninja in the first three seasons.

In 2014 Karin left the cast temporarily to dedicate to the other work in the transmitter, being explained in the series that its personage had entered an aesthetic clinic and mysteriously disappeared. The project in question was Sexo e as Negas, inspired by the American Sex and the City, but it is based on the periphery and exclusively with black actresses. In 2015, after six years of theater career, he finally received the chance to play her first protagonist, the character Deloris Van Cartier, Mudança de Hábito, performed in theaters by Whoopi Goldberg and on the American stage by Raven-Symoné. In 2016 returns to the fifth season of Pé na Cova. Soon after it signs contract with the SBT to integrate the soap opera Carinha de Anjo, interpreting Sister Fabiana.

== Filmography ==
Year	TV show	Role	Notes
2002	Popstars	Contestant (Won)	Season 1
2002	Rouge: A História	Presenter	
2003	Romeu e Julieta	Friend of Julieta	Year end special
2005	Floribella	Herself	Episode: "July 14, 2005"
2011	Aquele Beijo	Bernadete do Amaral	
2013	Fábrica de Estrelas	Herself	Episode: "The Return of the Rouge"; Episode: "Everything Is Rouge"; Episode: "Everything Again"
2013–16	Pé na Cova	Soninja Torres Sampaio	
2014	Sexo e as Negas	Zulma dos Santos	
2016-18	Carinha de Anjo	Sister Fabiana Canto Teixeira	
2018	Que Marravilha!	Participant	Season 21
2021	Drag Me as a Queen	Participant	Episode: "Karin Hils"
2022	The Chorus: Success, Here I Go	Marion de Almeida	
2023-24	A Infância de Romeu e Julieta	Gláucia Monteiro Bastos	
2023	Cantando em Família	Juror	
2023	Marcelo, Marmelo, Martelo	Cristina	

=== Films ===
Year	Film	Character
2003	Xuxa Abracadabra	Herself
2005	Eliana em O Segredo dos Golfinhos	Herself

== Theatre appearances ==
Year	Production	Role
2009	Hairspray	Dynamite 3
2010	Emoções Baratas	Cici
2010–11	Hair	Dionne
2012–13	Xanadu	Thalia
2013	Alô, Dolly!	Ensemble
2015–16	Mudança de Hábito	Deloris Van Cartier
2019	A Mentira	Laura
2020–22	Donna Summer Musical	Donna Summer
2023	Marrom, O Musical	Alcione
2025	Wicked	Madame Morrible

== Discography ==
=== Singles ===
Song	Year	Album
"Fogo"	2020	Added to no album
"Pra Você Ficar"	2020	Added to no album
"Nossa Lei"	2020	Added to no album
"Sente a Pressão"	2021	Added to no album
"Alô"	2022	Added to no album

=== Other appearances ===
Song	Year	Other(s) artist(s)	Album
"Crise de Existência" (backing vocal)	2005	CPM 22	Felicidade Instantânea
"Nossa Festa Começou"	2007	Suave, Endrigo Baggio and Michel Martins	Dance Dance Dance
"Só Eu e Você"	2008	Túlio Dek	O Que Se Leva da Vida É a Vida Que Se Leva
"Cartas pra Você" (backing vocal)	2009	NX Zero	Agora
"Última Missão"	2013	Edi Rock and Nego Jam	Contra Nós Ninguém Será
