= Vem Cair na Zueira =

Single by Rouge

from the album C'est La Vie
- Released: November 29, 2003
- Recorded: 2003
- Genre: Latin pop; dance-pop; zouk
- Length: 3:24
- Label: Columbia; Sony
- Songwriter: Rick Bonadio
- Producer: Bonadio

Rouge singles chronology
"Um Anjo Veio Me Falar" (2003)	"Vem Cair na Zueira" (2003)	"Blá Blá Blá" (2004)

"Vem Cair na Zueira" (lit.: Come To The Fun) is a song by the Brazilian girl group pop Rouge, from their second studio album, C'est La Vie (2003). The song was written and produced by Rick Bonadio, and brings again the dance-pop and zouk with Latin elements in their sonority. The song talks about living in peace, having fun, without thinking of anything. In the middle of the song, Aline does a rap.

Released as the album's third single in November 29, 2003, "Vem Cair na Zueira" became a success, reaching the Top 10 of the Brazilian charts. The group did a part in the film Xuxa Abracadabra, by the entertainer Xuxa Meneghel, singing and performing the song. Like the other singles of C'est La Vie, "Vem Cair na Zueira" was promoted extensively, being sung in numerous TV shows. It was the group's last single released before Luciana Andrade's departure in February 2004, and also the last single to include her vocals.

== Background and release ==
Following the success of the debut album, Rouge (2002), which sold more than 1 million copies, and the hit "Ragatanga", which was more than 2 months at the top of the charts, Sony Music decided to launch a new album of the band, following the same format of the first album, with the difference of bringing a new style for the group.

For that, was brought to the album the zouk rhythm that already was present in the musical scene mainly in Europe. The rhythm has a similarity with the lambada and it appeared in the Antilles. The song was released in April 2003.

Fantine Thó, also a member of the group, commented on the new work:

Zouk has been in Brazil for a long time, but no artist has yet introduced him to the general public. We are launching pop zouk, with the face of Rouge.

"Vem Cair na Zueira" was written and produced by Rick Bonadio, and counts on some verses in Spanish. The song, as well as the first single "Brilha La Luna", derives from the zouk, only that still closer to the "zouk root," according to Patricia. For Denis Moreira, from Época Magazine, "the song has a great pop appeal." "Vem Cair na Zueira" begins with Karin Hils singing about how beautiful life is, and she just wants to live in peace while Luciana Andrade questions about the people with so much money, who always want more, and invites everyone to dance. In the chorus, the girls exchange verses in Portuguese and Spanish, "Oba Oba Oba Oba Oba Êh Comes in the zueira Oba Oba Oba Oba Oba Oba Oba Oba Oba Oba Oba Oba Oba Oba Oba Oba Oba Do not be fooled."

In the second part, Karin sings about time, which does not come back, while Luciana says that singing is her destiny, and calls everyone to dance once more. At the bridge, the girls sing, "A speech that takes, a speech that has, has," repeatedly. After the bridge, Aline Wirley does a rap, referring to the success "Ragatanga", among other things, "[...] The DJ is connected and already knows the style, The midnight sound everyone is enjoying Come, come what now the bank will break The Raga-Ragatanga he put to play, then Come, come and dance the Zouk with us ... ", Aline sings.

=== Other versions ===
A Spanish version of the song, titled "Vien aqui pacha en guea", was made for the album Rouge En Español, but the album was not released due to Luciana leaving. Even so, the song was released on the internet.

== Usage in media ==
The Rouge girls made their film debut by participating in the Xuxa Abracadabra film of 2003 by the artist Xuxa Meneghel, while singing and performing "Vem Cair na Zueira" in the film, as if they were in a show. The singers also participated of the collective of the film, in the time of debut of the feature film.

== Charts ==
Chart (2003–04)	Peak position
Brazil (Brasil Hot 100 Airplay)	9
