= Maria Willson =

British singer (born 1982)

Maria Willson (born 1982/3) is a British singer who first found fame on Michael Barrymore's My Kind of People with a host of television and radio performances following. In 2003 and 2004, she released two hit singles, "Chooza Looza" reaching No. 29 and "Mr. Alibi" getting to No. 43 in the UK Singles Chart. She also went on a nationwide tour supporting Busted. Telstar Records, with whom Maria had signed, went into administration. Willson continued to look for a new recording contract. In 2007, she performed vocals on the DT8 Project song, "Perfect World", which was the title track on their first album.

Willson has been singing in the United States and Europe, and performed in both (Germany) and Spain.
