= Um Anjo Veio Me Falar =

2003 single by Rouge

Single by Rouge

from the album C'est La Vie
- Released: July 8, 2003
- Recorded: 2003
- Genre: Pop; Latin pop
- Length: 3:45
- Label: Columbia; Sony
- Songwriters: Eliot Kennedy; Suzanne Shaw; Tim Woodcock; Aline Wirley; Fantine Thó; Li Martins; Karin Hils; Luciana Andrade; Rick Bonadio
- Producer: Rick Bonadio

Rouge singles chronology
"Brilha La Luna" (2003)	"Um Anjo Veio Me Falar" (2003)	"Vem Cair na Zueira" (2003)

Music video
- "Um Anjo Veio Me Falar" on YouTube

"Um Anjo Veio Me Falar" (lit.: "An angel came to speak to me") is a song by the Brazilian girl group pop Rouge. it is a version of the song "Angel in My Heart", written by Eliot Kennedy, Suzanne Shaw and Tim Woodcock and performed by the pop groups Hear'Say (on the album Everybody) and Jump5 (on the album All the Time in the World). The Portuguese version was written by the group members with Rick Bonadio, who also produced the song. "Um Anjo Veio Me Falar" is a pop ballad that talks about the quest and expectation of a great love announced by an angel.

Released as the second single from their second studio album C'est La Vie (2003), in July 8, 2003. The song was a hit on radio stations all over Brazil, helping the group gain nationwide renown, and becoming the second most famous song of the group (behind only "Ragatanga") and the ballad of greater recognition. The song won 2 awards: the "Capricho Award" and the "Troféu Universo Musical". The music video of the song was recorded in Argentina, along with its Spanish version. Like the other singles of C'est La Vie, "Um Anjo Veio Me Falar" was promoted extensively, being performed on numerous TV shows.

== Background and release ==
Following the success of the debut album, Rouge (2002), which sold more than 1 million copies, and the hit "Ragatanga", which was more than 2 months at the top of the charts, Sony Music decided to launch a new album of the band, following the same format of the first album. The difference was that in the second album, the girls had more freedom, being able to follow the process of recording and even composing. "The first album was prepared for the band to win, C'est La Vie is our baby, it has our face, from the album to the visual, we can talk about everything," confesses Luciana. As for Patricia, "One characteristic of this new album that we brought from the old is diversity. Each one has a different style, which makes the repertoire varied."

This freedom allowed the group to compose a track together, "Um Anjo Veio Me Falar" which to Aline, "It was good because we did not have to do it, so it could be in a spontaneous way, almost a joke."

Luciana, also a member of the group, commented on the work on the song:

It was cool because it rolled in a relaxed way. Rick threw the idea to Patty, she thought in context. Then he decided to play the idea for everyone. We talked while Rick, more experienced, was stoning. The result was great. It's one of my favorite songs on the album.

=== Other versions ===
"Angel in My Heart"

Song by Hear'Say

from the album Everybody
- Released: December 3, 2001
- Recorded: 2001
- Length: 3:47
- Label: Polydor
- Songwriters: Eliot Kennedy; Suzanne Shaw; Tim Woodcock; Myleene Klass; Noel Sullivan; Kym Marsh; Danny Foster
- Producer: True North

The original version of the song is called "Angel in My Heart" which was performed by the pop groups Hear'Say and Jump5 respectively and originally wasn't released as a single. A Spanish language version, titled "Un Ángel Vive en Mí", was made for the album Rouge En Español, but the album was not released due to the departure of Luciana. Even so, the song was released on the internet.

After leaving Luciana, a new version of the song was made, to replace the parts sung by her. Fantine (the only member of the group who did not have a solo on the single) replaced the verses of the former member.

== Composition and lyrics ==
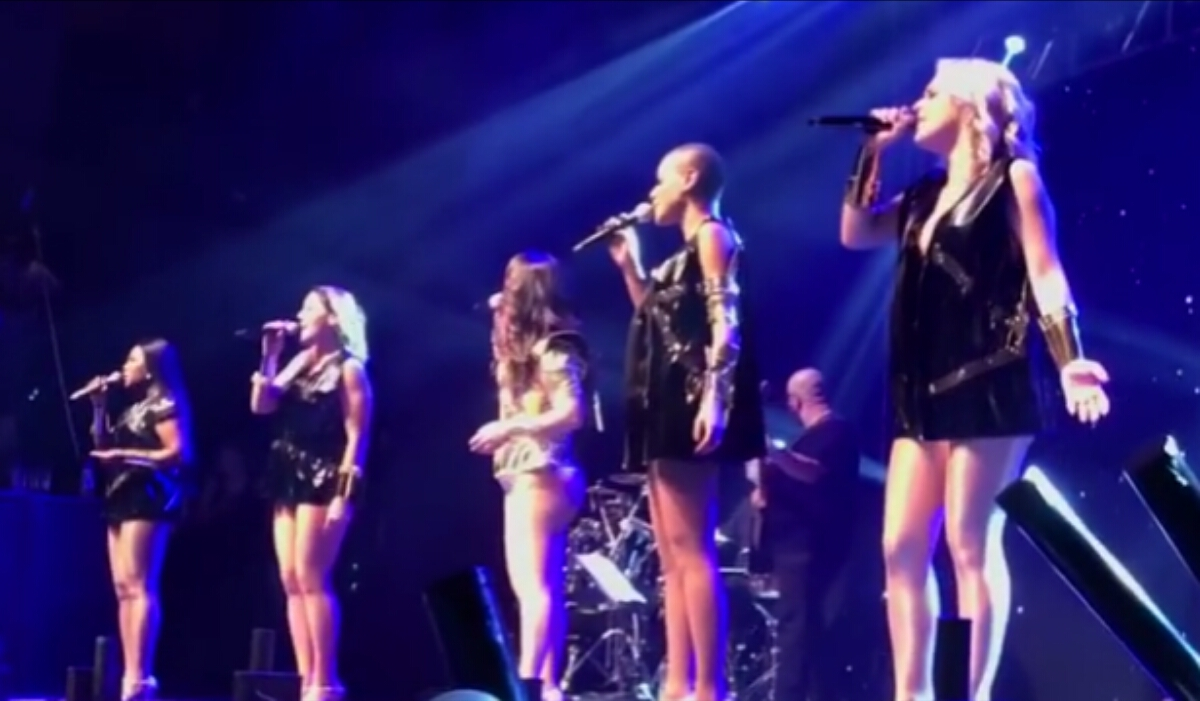
the group performing "Um Anjo Veio me Falar" No Curitiba in Paraná, during the tour 15 Anos Tour

"Um Anjo Veio Me Falar" was written by Aline Wirley, Fantine Thó, Karin Hils, Luciana Andrade and Patrícia Lissa, in partnership with Rick Bonadio, who also produced the song. "Um Anjo Veio Me Falar" begins with Patricia trying to understand the heart, speaking that she believes she will live a great love. In the chorus, the girls sing, "Um Anjo Veio Me Falar," while Patricia responds, "Love has come to me," the girls sing again, "She came to show me," and Patricia once again responds and continues, "that the dream has no end No matter how long it will take (I'll wait for you) And it's never been so strong, I heard an angel tell me."

In the second part, Aline sings about dreaming of a kiss and a caring someone. Karin and Luciana sing that someday they will find love, and Luciana sings, "In your arms is where I want to be." At the bridge, Aline sings once more, "All the love I've always sought, you've come to show me." Still on bridge, they claim to have found an "angel", "the love they have always dreamed of." The last refrain follows in the same molds of the previous refrains.

== Reception ==
=== Critical response ===
The song was very well received, being indicated and winner in the category "Best Music" in the prizes "Capricho Awards" and "Troféu Musical Universe".

=== Legacy ===
Even without reaching number 1 on the charts, "Um Anjo Veio Me Falar" has become one of the pop group's best-known songs to date, behind only "Ragatanga." In terms of the ballad, "Um Anjo Veio Me Falar" became the group's best-known ballad, receiving numerous covers. The song showed that Pop, also is made of ballads, with great prominence for the voices of the girls. The song was also part of the soundtrack of the soap opera Canavial de Paixões (2003), SBT.

== Music video ==
The music video of the song counts on the girls with a hippie look, in a trip, that begins in a trailer, is also shown the girls singing around a bonfire, besides them in the beach, throwing flowers in the sea.

== Track listings ==
CD Single

1. "Um Anjo Veio Me Falar (Angel In My Heart)"

== Charts ==
Chart (2003)	Peak position
Brazil (Brasil Hot 100 Airplay)	12
