= A Festa dos Seus Sonhos =

Live album Video album by Rouge
- Released: December 3, 2003
- Recorded: September 23, 2003
- Venue: Pacaembu Stadium
- Genre: Pop
- Length: 75:39
- Label: Columbia; Sony
- Producer: Rick Bonadio

Rouge chronology
C'est La Vie (2003)	A Festa dos Seus Sonhos (2003)	Blá Blá Blá (2003)

A Festa dos Seus Sonhos (lit.: The Party of Your Dreams) is a video album by Brazilian pop girl group Rouge. It was released by Columbia and Sony on December 3, 2003. The album features the group performing live in São Paulo, at Pacaembu Stadium, on September 23, 2003, to celebrate first-year career and drew a crowd of over 23,000 people.

== Track listing ==
No.	Title	Length
1.	"Abertura"
2.	"C'est La Vie"
3.	"Beijo Molhado"
4.	"Olha Só"
5.	"Me Faz Feliz"
6.	"Te Deixo Tocar"
7.	"Um Anjo Veio Me Falar"
8.	"Não Dá pra Resistir"
9.	"Fantasma"
10.	"Depois Que Tudo Mudou"
11.	"Hoje Eu Sei"
12.	"Brilha La Luna"
13.	"Ragatanga"
14.	"Vem Cair na Zueira"
15.	"Quando Chega A Noite"
16.	"Ragatanga (Bis)"
17.	"Brilha La Luna (Bis)"
Total length:		51:32

== Bonus ==
The DVD also includes the Rouge girls teaching the choreographies of their most famous songs like Ragatanga, Não Dá pra Resistir, Brilha La Luna, Beijo Molhado, Me Faz Feliz, Vem Cair na Zueira and C'est La Vie. And also two video clips of Brilha La Luna and Um Anjo Veio Me Falar.

== Awards ==
The DVD received two awards, in "Capricho Awards 2004" and "Troféu Universo Musical 2004", in addition to being nominated for "Multishow Brazilian Music Award", all in the category "Best DVD".

Year	Awards ceremony	Award	Results
2003	Multishow Brazilian Music Award	Best DVD	Nominated
2004	Capricho Awards 2004	Best DVD	Won
2004	Troféu Universo Musical 2004	Best DVD	Won

== Certifications ==
Country	Certification	Sales/shipments
Brazil	Diamond	250.000
