= Algo tienes =

2004 single by Paulina Rubio

"Algo Tienes"

Single by Paulina Rubio

from the album Pau-Latina
- Released: May 17, 2004
- Genre: Pop; dance; pop rock
- Length: 3:07
- Label: Universal Latino
- Songwriters: Chris Rodríguez; Manny Benito
- Producer: Chris Rodríguez

Paulina Rubio singles chronology
"Te Quise Tanto" (2004)	"Algo Tienes" (2004)	"Dame Otro Tequila" (2004)

Music video
- "Algo Tienes" on YouTube

"Algo Tienes" (English: "You Have Something") is a song recorded by Mexican singer Paulina Rubio for her seventh studio album, Pau-Latina (2004). Written and produced by Chris Rodríguez and Manny Benito, it is a pop and dance track containing a catchy "Pau! Pau!" hook. The song was released by Universal Latino as the second single from the album on May 17, 2004.

The song was well received by music critics, many of whom praised its production. Commercially, it reached number one in Mexico, and also peaked inside the top ten in several other countries. In the United States, "Algo Tienes" became her second number-one song on Billboard's Latin Pop Airplay chart, while it climbed to the number four on the Hot Latin Songs chart.

The music video for "Algo Tienes", directed by Dago González, shows Rubio seductively entering a construction site. She wears a yellow outfit with caution tape, and others sensual costumes. Rubio performed it live at the 2005 Latin Billboard Music Awards, Tu Musica Awards, Festival of Viña del Mar and at several TV shows.

== Music video ==
The accompanying music video for "Algo Tienes" was directed by Dago González, and it was filmed in Torrance, California. Its shooting lasted for 20 hours, and featured P J López in its photography, and Cristóbal Valecillos as production designer. Director González said about working with the singer: "Working with Pau has been one of the most rewarding experiences, because she has no problems, she is very open and fanned. When I would make a suggestion she always would add something. When I would say "Go" she would say "Yes", but that she would do more, and this makes her like no other".

It depicts Rubio as a sensual DJ who transforms a construction site into a party. She can be seen completely naked in some scenes, covered with a yellow police tape written "Caution".

== Chart performance ==
Although "Algo Tienes" did not reach the US Billboard Hot 100, it managed to reach number 21 on the Bubbling Under Hot 100 chart, and number four on the Hot Latin Songs – becoming the album's second consecutive top ten single – and number one on the Latin Pop Airplay.

== Live performances ==
Rubio performed the song at the 2005 Latin Billboard Music Awards, wearing a feathered headdress, similar to those of Native Americans. In 2015, MSN called it one of the best performances in the awards show of all time, stating that "A combination of the wardrobe, choreography and her sexy looks that made Paulina's performance one to remember".

== Formats and track listing ==
These are the formats and track listings of major single releases of "Algo Tienes".

Mexico CD promo

1. "Algo Tienes"

== Charts ==
=== Weekly charts ===
Chart (2004)	Peak position
Mexico (Reforma)	1
US Bubbling Under Hot 100 (Billboard)	21
US Hot Latin Songs (Billboard)	4
US Latin Pop Airplay (Billboard)	1
US Tropical Songs (Billboard)	4

=== Year-end charts ===
Chart (2004)	Peak position
US Hot Latin Songs (Billboard)	43
US Latin Pop Airplay (Billboard)	22

== Rouge version ==
"Pá Pá Lá Lá"

Single by Rouge

from the album Blá Blá Blá
- Released: November 27, 2004
- Recorded: 2004
- Genre: Pop; dance-pop
- Length: 3:10
- Label: Columbia; Sony
- Songwriters: Chris Rodríguez; Manny Benito; Rick Bonadio
- Producer: Rick Bonadio

Rouge singles chronology
"Sem Você" (2004)	"Pá Pá Lá Lá" (2004)	"Vem Habib (Wala Wala)" (2005)

The Brazilian girl group pop Rouge made a version for the song, titled "Pá Pá Lá Lá", for their third studio album, Blá Blá Blá (2004). The version was written and produced by Rick Bonadio, and released as the album's third and final single on November 27, 2004.

Launched as the album's last single, "Pá Pá Lá Lá" had a good performance in the charts, being able to enter the Top 15 of Hot 100 Brasil, in position number 20. To promote the song, the group went to various TV shows. In addition, the group also sang the song on Blá Blá Blá Tour (2004) and Mil e Uma Noites Tour (2005).

== Composition and lyrics ==
The version of "Algo Tienes", titled "Pá Pá Lá Lá", was written and produced by Rick Bonadio, bringing the same elements of the original song, with some more "Brazilian" beats. is not feeling normal, and that something is happening, while Fantine says that he has gone mad, and that the person makes her lose control. The chorus brings Karin with the lead voice, singing, "Your strength dominates me, I scream" pá pá pá pá lá lá lá lá ... Your look hypnotizes me I feel "pá pá pá pá lá lá lá lá..."
