= Aline Wirley =

Brazilian actress and singer-songwriter (born 1981)

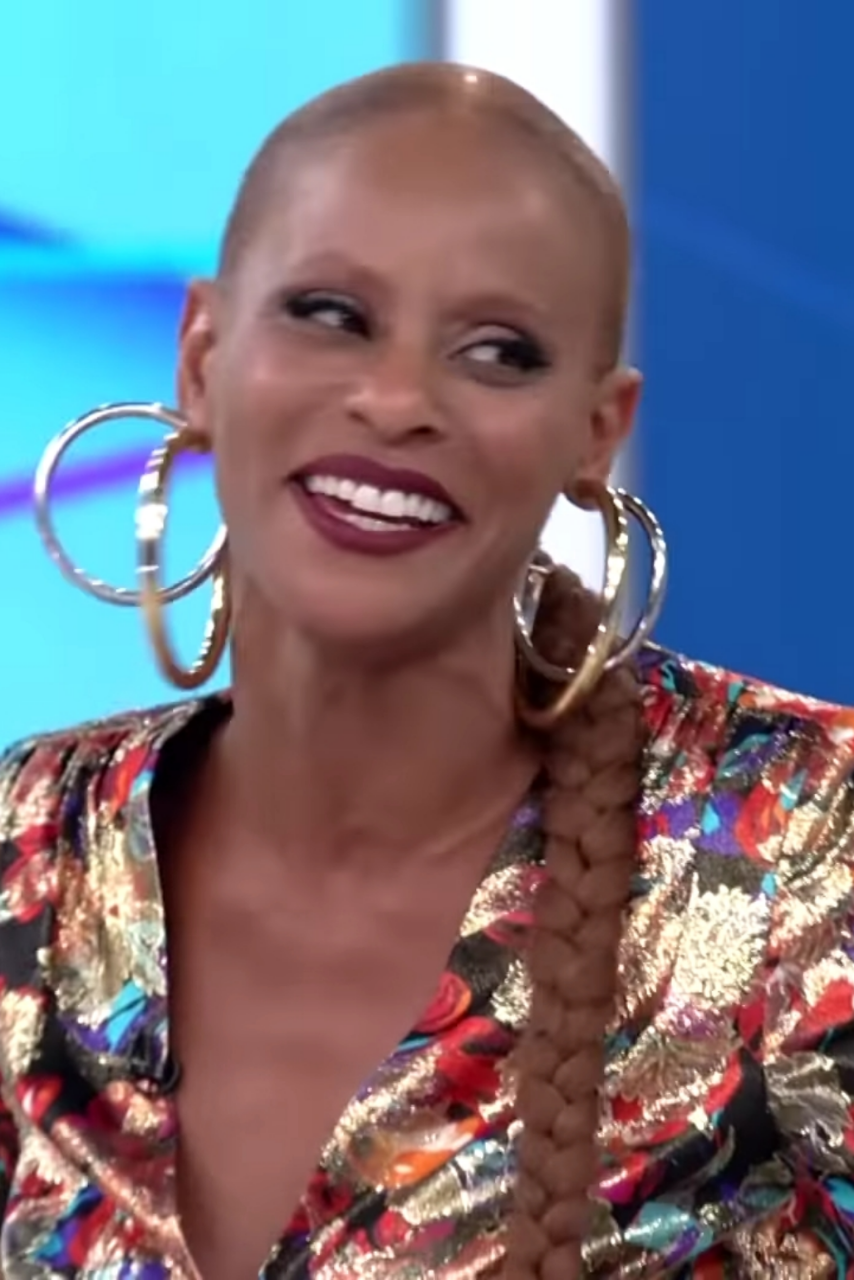
- Wirley in 2023
- Born: Aline Wirley da Silva; 18 December 1981 (age 44); São Paulo, Brazil
- Occupations: Singer; songwriter; actress
- Years active: 2002–present
- Spouse: Igor Rickli (m. 2015)
- Children: 1
- Musical career
- Genres: Samba; MPB
- Instrument: Vocals
- Labels: Columbia; Sony BMG
- Formerly of: Rouge
- Website: alinewirley.com

Aline Wirley da Silva (born 18 December 1981) is a Brazilian actress and singer-songwriter. In 2002, she won the talent show Popstars and joined the Brazilian girl group Rouge until 2005, with which she released four studio albums, Rouge (2002), C'est La Vie (2003), Blá Blá Blá (2004) and Mil e Uma Noites (2005), selling in all 6 million copies and becoming best-seller Brazilian girl group.

In 2008, it debuted like actress of musical theatre when integrating the cast of O Soar da Liberdade, like the personage Mia. On 2 February 2009, she released her debut solo studio album, Saudades do Samba, influenced by tropicália, independently. The following year interpreted Jane in the conceptualized Hairspray and, between 2010 and 2011, was in Hair like Mary Janet. The biggest highlight in her career came in 2012, when he joined Tim Maia: Vale Tudo, a musical inspired by the singer's tracks, playing in the role of Ze Mauricio until 2014. At the same time, between 2013 and 2014, he toured several cities with her first tour, titled Ritualística, interpreting songs of MPB and tropicália. In 2014 she gave birth to her first son, Antonio. In 2016, it returns to the scenes in the musical Show in Simonal, interpreting Ângela, one of the Simonetes, the vocalistas that accompanied Wilson Simonal in its shows.

== Biography ==
Aline was born on 18 December 1981, in a suburb of the São Paulo city. She is of African, Italian, German and Indigenan descent. When she was a little child, she moved to the city of Cachoeira Paulista as soon as her parents separated, going to live with her mother and an aunt. In 1996, at the age of 14, she began to sing in the choir of the church where she attended. From the age of 16, she joined a band of MPB and bossa nova, that performed in bars and steakhouses, adhering to a vast repertoire that included Tim Maia, Adriana Calcanhoto, Chico Buarque, Roberto Carlos and Elis Regina, her greatest idol.

Over time, she learned basic English language to include songs by international singers such as Celine Dion and Whitney Houston. In 1999 left the family and moved to Taubaté with the dream to go to college of Performing arts, however ended up having to work in diverse places, from seller even maid to maintain itself.

== Career ==
=== 2002–06: Rouge ===
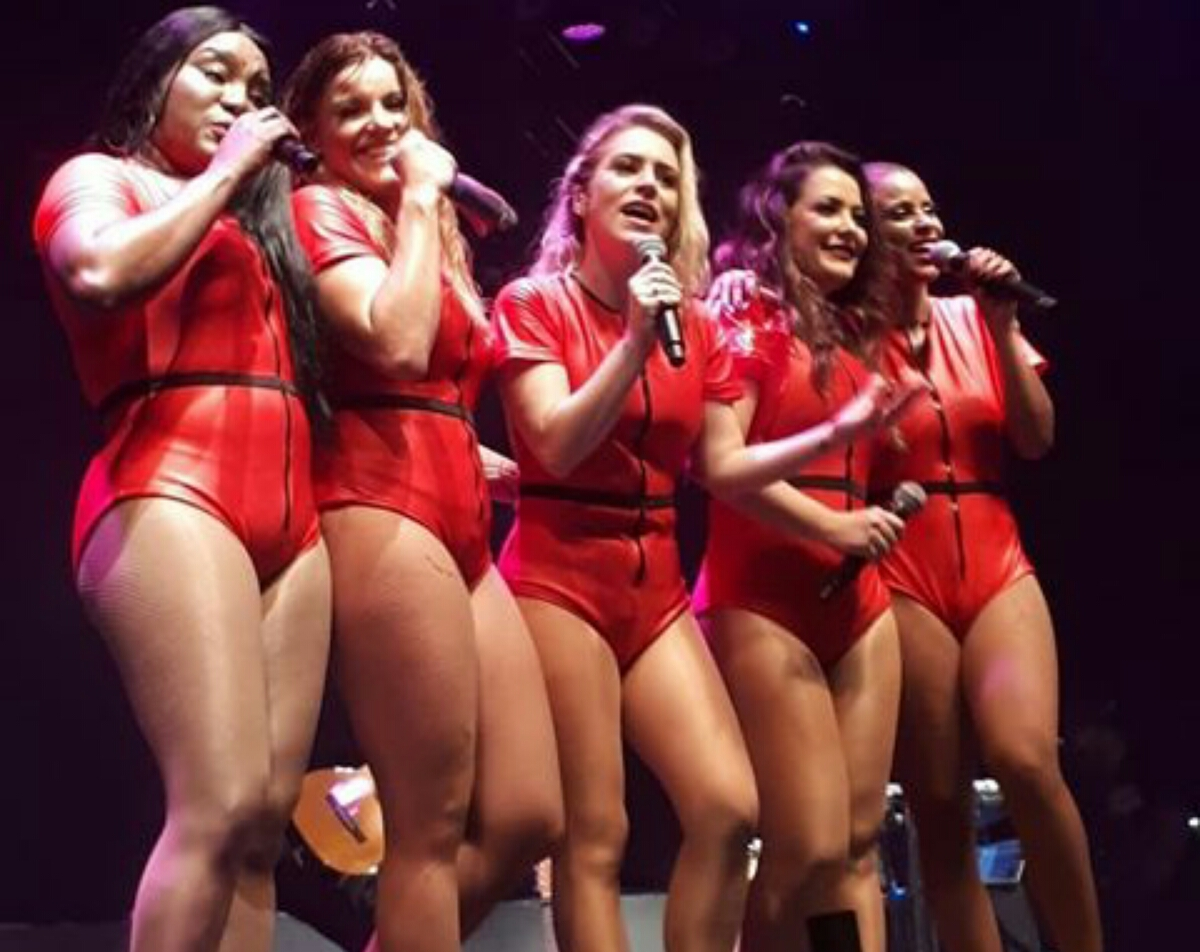
Rouge on tour 15 Anos in 2018.

In 2002 Wirley enrolled in the talent show Popstars, being selected from 30 thousand enrolled for the second phase of the program, where more than 6 thousand were classified in the Anhembi Sambadrome, São Paulo, where they performed song evaluation. In the following phases, the jurors became more and more demanding, in this way, selecting for the next stages only the girls who really were able to face the career of popstar. After 5 qualifying rounds, only 8 girls were classified for the final stage that took place at the home of the Popstars. After the 6th and final eliminatory phase, the Brazilian girl group was finally formed by Fantine Thó, Li Martins, Luciana Andrade, Aline Wirley and Karin Hils. In the same year was released the first studio album, the homonym Rouge, reaching the first position and selling around 2 million copies, receiving the certificate of diamond by Brazilian Association of Record Producers (ABPD). His Lead single was "Não Dá para Resistir" followed by "Ragatanga", track with special participation of Spanish girl group Las Ketchup, in addition to "Beijo Molhado" and "Nunca Deixe de Sonhar." Also the group released the remix album titled Rouge Remixes, selling 150 thousand copies, receiving certificate of gold, and the video album O Sonho de Ser Uma Popstar, bringing its first show.

In 2003 the group released the second studio album, C'est La Vie, selling around 100,000 copies in the first week of release and around 1 million copies in total, bringing as singles "Brilha La Luna", "Um Anjo Veio Me Falar" and "Vem Cair na Zueira". On 3 December is released the second record of concerts of the group on DVD, titled A Festa dos Seus Sonhos. On 11 February 2004, Luciana announced that she was leaving the group, claiming the lack of identification with the most dance-pop sound that the group was taking. After the departure of Luciana, the four remaining members continued and released the albums Blá Blá Blá (2004) and Mil e Uma Noites (2005). The group split definitively in June 2006, when the contract with Sony Music expired and was not renewed. Over four years, the group sold about 6 million records, becoming the most successful female group in Brazil, and received in all, two gold certification, two platinum certification, one double platinum certification and one diamond certification by ABPD.

=== Solo career and theater ===
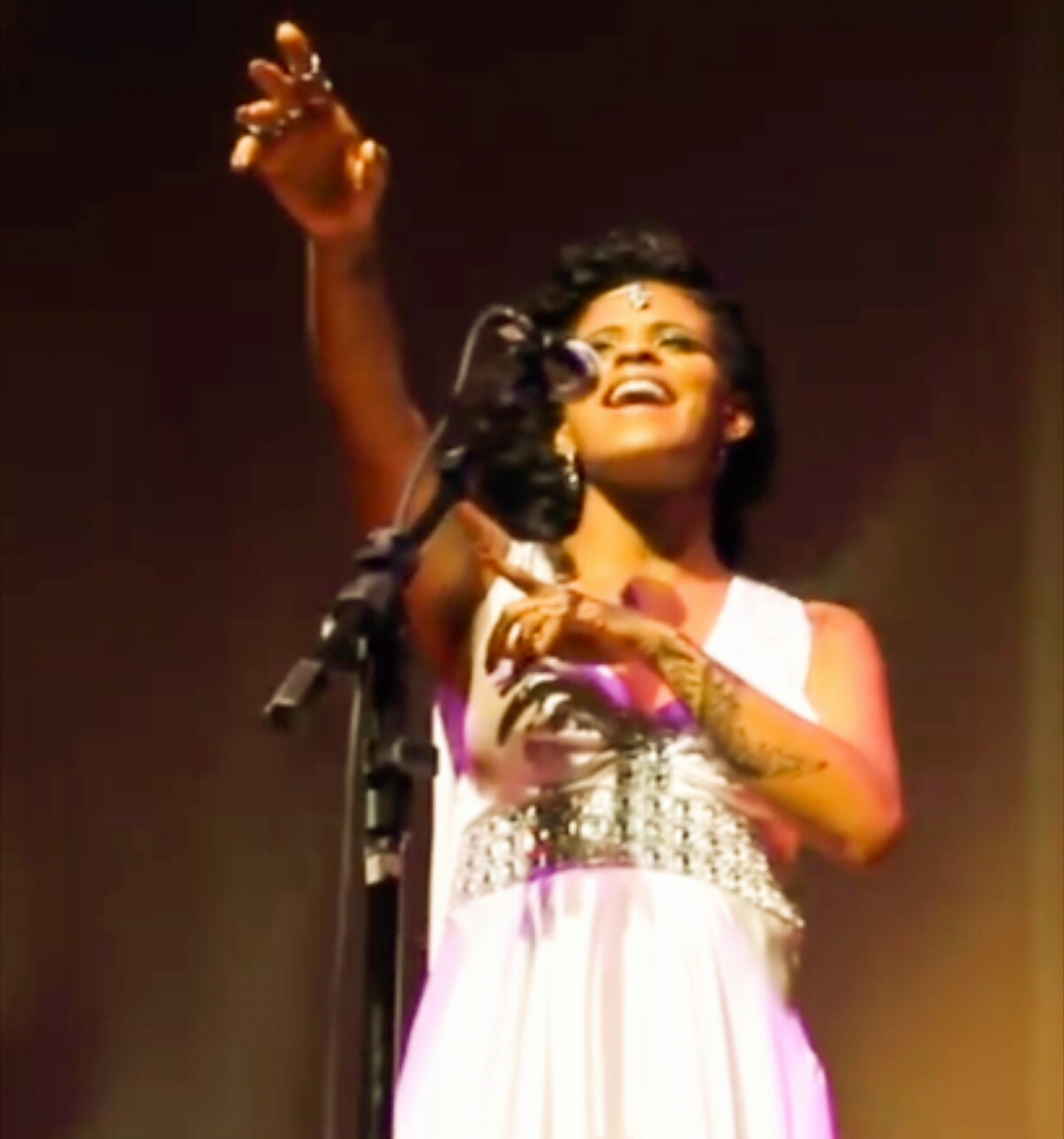
Aline on tour Ritualística in 2014.

At the end of 2005 Aline recorded a participation in the live album and DVD of the pop rock band Lagunna, which was to be released in 2006, interpreting the song "Minha Vez". At that moment the singer began to use as artistic name in solo career Aline Willy. Still in 2006 begins to record some songs for her own repertoire, released on her Myspace. In 2007, he performs on the studio album of samba singer Leandro Lehart, formerly band of Art Popular, in the track "Amor Ferido", being for the first time without her former group in television programs. At the end of the following year, in 2008, passes in the tests to participate in the musical theatre O Soar da Liberdade, interpreting one of the protagonists. In the ocaisão the singer had changed its artistic name to Aline Silva with the aim of appearing more popular.

After three years working on her compositions, finally on 2 February 2009, he released her first studio album entitled Saudades do Samba, directly on her website. The work, inspired by Elis Regina and Chico Buarque and released by independent record label, focused on the roots of Samba and MPB, leaving aside the old pop music that realized. The album did not have any song released for the radio, although "Sufoco" was featured in the soundtrack of the novel Mutantes: Promessas de Amor. At the end of 2009 along with her friend Karin Hils happens to integrate the cast of the adaptation of Broadway musical Hairspray, gaining prominence for its performance despite the small role. From this year changed her stage name for the third time to Aline Wirley, her second surname, in order to sound more sophisticated to the musicals. Between 2010 and 2011 it gains prominence when participating in the renowned Hair, another direct adaptation of Broadway. In 2012 enters to the main cast of Tim Maia: Vale Tudo, musical that relates in songs the life and work of the singer Tim Maia In 2013 it began to new solo show titled Ritualística, realizing a presentation in Rio with a repertoire varied, covering several important songs historically from tropicália to MPB, traveling through Brazil until the end of 2014.

== Personal life ==
In 2010, she began to date the actor Igor Rickli. In March 2014, she announced her first pregnancy, and gave birth to her first son Antônio in September 2014. On 14 May 2015, he officially Spouse Igor, after five years of relationship, in a surprise ceremony performed by the actor. In September 2015 she became ambassador of the NGO Aldeias Infantis SOS Brasil.

On 14 October 2021, Wirley revealed during an interview with Kelly Key's channel that she is bisexual and that she dated a woman for years. She is in an open marriage.

== Influences ==
Her musical influences are Elis Regina, Alcione Nazareth, Clara Nunes and Whitney Houston.

== Discography ==
=== Studio albums ===
Album	Details
Saudades do Samba	Release date: 2 February 2009; Formats: CD, digital download; Label: Independent
Indômita	Release date: 27 November 2020; Formats: CD, vinyl, digital download, streaming; Label: Independent

=== Singles ===
Title	Year	Album
"Quero Parar Mas Não Consigo"	2017	Non-album single
"Curva do Rio"	2020	Indômita

==== As featured artist ====
Title	Year	Album
"Sei Quella Per Me" (Rio band feat. Aline Silva)	2008	Mariachi Hotel

=== Other appearances ===
Title	Year	Other artist (s)	Album
"Minha Vez"	2006	Lagunna	Intro
"Bratitude"	2007	Li Martins	Bratz: O Filme
"Amor Ferido"	2007	Leandro Lehart	Vem Dançar o Mestiço
"Sufoco"	2009	—N/a	Mutantes: Promessas de Amor
"Cartas pra Você" (backing vocal)	2009	NX Zero	Agora
"Coração de Mãe"	2012	Mariani	Saudades do Amanhã

=== Music videos ===
Title	Year	Director	Notes
"Sei Quella Per Me"	2008	Emerson Godoi	Guest artist; Music video by Rio

== Filmography ==
Year	TV show	Role	Notes
2002	Popstars	Contestant (Won)	Season 1
2002	Rouge: A História	Presenter	
2003	Romeu e Julieta	Friend of Julieta	Year end special
2005	Floribella	Herself	Episode: "July 14, 2005"
2009	Cortinas	Presenter	Rede Aparecida
2011	Aquele Beijo	Bernadete do Amaral	
2013	Fábrica de Estrelas	Herself	Episode: "The Return of the Rouge"; Episode: "Everything Is Rouge"; Episode: "Everything Again"
2022	The Masked Singer Brasil	Caranguejo	
2023	Big Brother Brasil 23	Herself	

=== Films ===
Year	Film	Character
2003	Xuxa Abracadabra	Herself
2005	Eliana em O Segredo dos Golfinhos	Herself
2019	UglyDolls	Moxy (Brazilian voice)
2021	Paw Patrol: The Movie	Liberty (Brazilian voice)
2023	Paw Patrol: The Mighty Movie	Liberty (Brazilian voice)

== Theatre appearances ==
Year	Production	Role	Ref.
2008–09	O Soar da Liberdade	Mia	
2009	Hairspray	Jane	
2010–11	Hair	Mary Janet	
2012–14	Tim Maia: Vale Tudo	Zé Maurício	
2016–17	Show em Simonal	Ângela (Simonete)	
2024	É O Amor	Herself	—N/a

== Tours ==
- Ritualística Tour (2013–14)
