= Fantine Thó =

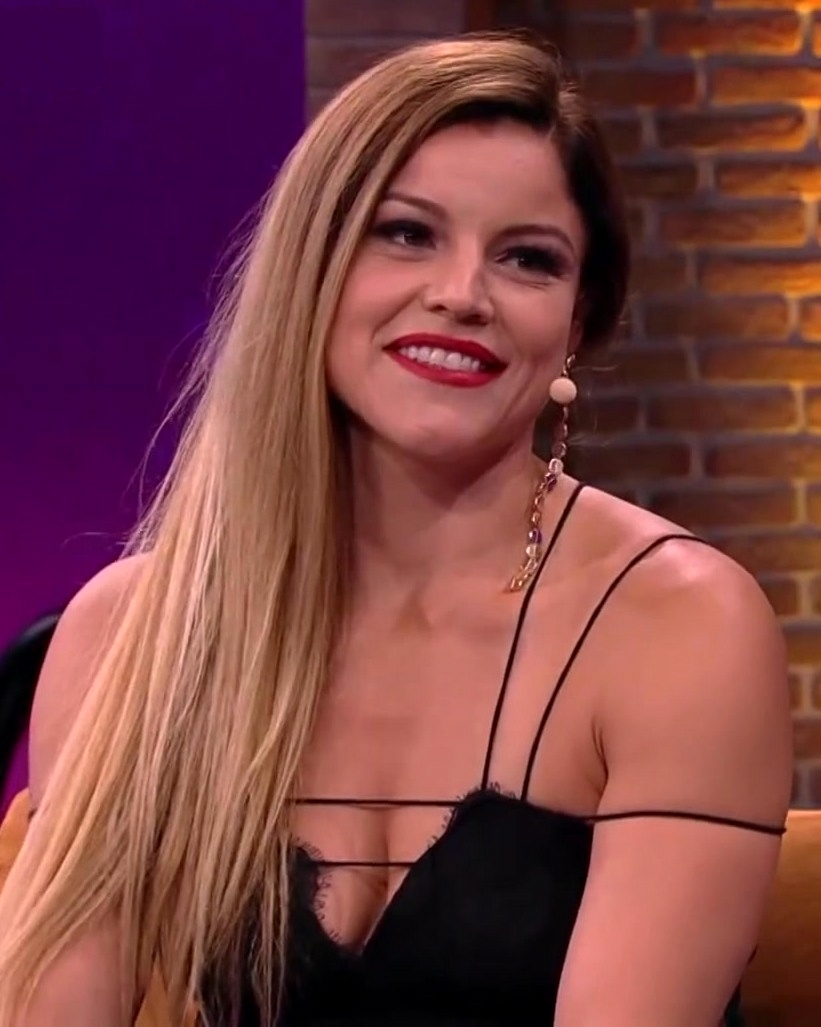
- Thó in 2018
- Born: 15 February 1979 (age 47); Barra do Garças, Mato Grosso, Brazil
- Other name: Atma Mutriba (Yoga confirmation name)
- Occupations: Singer; songwriter; dancer; instructor
- Years active: 2002–present
- Spouse: Nick van Balen (m. 2007; div. 2013)
- Children: 1
- Musical career
- Genres: Rock; experimental; bhangra
- Instruments: Vocals; guitar; piano; drum
- Labels: Columbia; Sony BMG
- Formerly of: Rouge
- Website: fantinetho.com

Fantine Rodrigues Thó (born 15 February 1979) is a Brazilian and Dutch singer, songwriter and instructor. In 2002, she won the talent show Popstars and joined the Brazilian girl group Rouge, with which she released four studio albums, Rouge (2002), C'est La Vie (2003), Blá Blá Blá (2004) and Mil e Uma Noites (2005), selling in all 6 million copies and becoming the most successful girl group of Brazil and Latin America, before leaving in 2005. In 2006, she formed the progressive rock band Banda Thó with her brother Jonathan and some friends, which did not give continuity at the end of the following year, when she married and moved to Netherlands.

On November 25, 2011, the group released its first extended play, Rise, directly on the SoundCloud streaming platform. On February 20, 2015, she released her debut album, Dusty But New, with nine songs composed by her. In that same year, she became a reporter for Do Brasil, video for Brazilians living in Europe. In 2016, she founds her own yoga center, Atma Mutriba, in which she happened to be the instructor.

== Early life ==
Fantine Rodrigues Thó was born on February 15, 1979, in the city of Barra do Garças, in the Brazilian state of Mato Grosso, but she stayed in the municipality because her father was an airplane pilot and was constantly transferred wherever he could practice his profession. For this reason, throughout her childhood she moved to places like Brasília, Goiânia, São Paulo and even abroad, in Santiago, Chile, where he remained until 1990. In the Chilean capital she began to study theater, singing, piano and dances such as jazz and tap dance, as well as attending an American school for six years. Back in Brazil, she settled in Palhoça, in the state of Santa Catarina, where she also learned guitar and participated in festivals. In 1995, she moved to Campinas, where, after finishing her studies, she studied for two years the University of Journalism in Pontifical Catholic University of Campinas, before locking it up to become a lifeguard. From 2000 she began playing in bars and restaurants with her brother, Jonathan.

== Career ==
=== 2002–06: Rouge ===
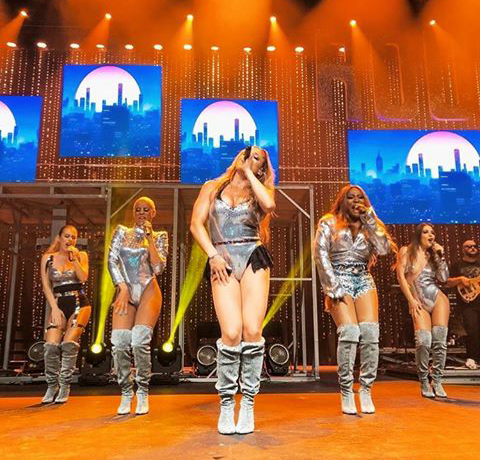
Fantine (the middle) during show of the group Rouge, in 2018.

In 2002 Fantine enrolled in the talent show Popstars, being selected from 30 thousand enrolled for the second phase of the program, where more than 6 thousand were classified in the Anhembi Sambadrome, São Paulo, where they performed song evaluation. In the following phases, the jurors became more and more demanding, in this way, selecting for the next stages only the girls who really were able to face the career of popstar. After 5 qualifying rounds, only 8 girls were classified for the final stage that took place at the home of the Popstars. After the 6th and final eliminatory phase, the Brazilian girl group was finally formed by Fantine, Li Martins, Luciana Andrade, Aline Wirley and Karin Hils. In the same year was released the first studio album, the homonym Rouge, reaching the first position and selling around 2 million copies, receiving the certificate of diamond by Brazilian Association of Record Producers (ABPD). His Lead single was "Não Dá para Resistir" followed by "Ragatanga", track with special participation of Spanish girl group Las Ketchup, in addition to "Beijo Molhado" and "Nunca Deixe de Sonhar." Also the group released the remix album titled Rouge Remixes, selling 150 thousand copies, receiving certificate of gold, and the video album O Sonho de Ser Uma Popstar, bringing its first show.

In 2003 the group released the second studio album, C'est La Vie, selling around 100,000 copies in the first week of release and around 1 million copies in total, bringing as singles "Brilha La Luna", "Um Anjo Veio Me Falar" and "Vem Cair na Zueira". On December 3 is released the second record of concerts of the group on DVD, titled A Festa dos Seus Sonhos. On February 11, 2004, Luciana announced that she was leaving the group, claiming the lack of identification with the most danceful sound that the group was taking. After the departure of Luciana, the four remaining members continued and released the albums Blá Blá Blá (2004) and Mil e Uma Noites (2005). The group split definitively in June 2006, when the contract with Sony Music expired and was not renewed. Over four years, the group sold about 6 million records, becoming the most successful female group in Brazil, and received in all, two gold certification, two platinum certification, one double platinum certification and one diamond certification by ABPD.

=== 2006–present: Thó band and solo career ===
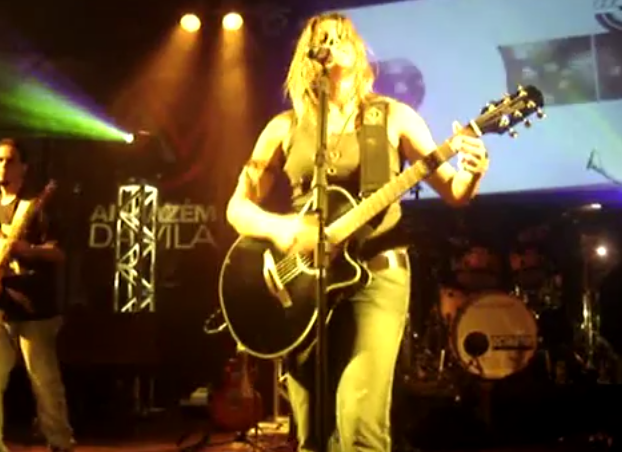
Thó Band in 2006.

In 2006, seeking to distance himself from the work performed in the group and express his own musical style, Fantine forms the Banda Thó with his brother Jonathan and some friends, focusing on rock. The band participated in some television programs and presented in several festivals, in addition to becoming a fix number in the pubs São Paulo Dublin Live Music and London Station, where they appeared weekly. In 2007 the band wanted to release an album, however Fantine ended up marrying and announcing her pregnancy, going to live in the Netherlands with her husband and finalizing the works with the Banda Thó. On May 9, 2009, after spending the last year dedicating herself to the first months of her daughter, she releases her first single as solo artist, "Born Again at Sunrise", of own composition and focused in the indie pop. At this time also returned to the stages when it happened to appear in Dutch houses of shows next to the musician Martijn Niggebrugge, interpreting covers of other artists. In 2011, after two years without devoting herself to professional projects, she was invited by Autism Magazine to become an ambassador for the social campaign of World Autism Day that year, launching the theme song "Hasta el Fim" on March 2, reverting all proceeds from the digital sale of this to charitable institutions.

On November 23 he released his second solo single, "Middle of the Night". On November 25 released the extended play, Rise directly on the SoundCloud streaming platform, bringing the two previous work tracks, plus three new songs recorded by her from the end of the Rouge randomly, but never included in an official work before - beyond of a Brazilian version of "When We Dance", of the British singer Sting, titled "Vem Dançar". In September 2013 she auditioned for the fourth edition Dutch talent show 'The Voice of Holland, in which three of the four technicians turned the chair to her, positivando its presentation, being that she opted for the equipment of the singer Marco Borsato. Fantine, however, was eliminated from the competition during the battles phase. On February 20, 2015, she released her first album, Dusty But New, with nine songs composed by her. On July 8, 2015, she returned to Brazil to tour several cities with Living Room Sessions - an unprecedented format in Brazil, based on presentations in smaller spaces, with a maximum audience of 30 people, sitting around the artist in cushions and rugs, under low light, creating an intimate atmosphere between public and interpret.

In August of becomes reporter of the Portal Do Brazil, that realizes video reports for Brazilians who live in Europe. On August 14 he released his new single, "My World." In 2016 he founded his own yoga center, the Atma Mutriba Group, where he became an instructor.

== Personal life ==
In 2005, during a presentation in Porto Alegre, she met the Dutch soundplaster Nick van Balen, who was in the country working on the tour of the American band Cake, they started dating shortly thereafter. On July 13, 2007, she announced that she had married Van Balen and was five months pregnant. In September he moved back to The Hague, Holland, where he lived. Soon after, on November 12, her daughter, Christine, was born. In 2013 she announced their separation after six years of marriage.

Thó has cited Sade, Sting, Rick Wakeman, Pat Metheny, Daniela Mercury, Madonna and Spice Girls as some her influences.

== Discography ==
=== Studio albums ===
Album list
Album	Details
Dusty But New	Release date: February 20, 2015; Formats: CD, Digital download; Label: Independente

=== Extended plays ===
Year	Details
Rise	Release date: December 25, 2011; Formats: Download digital; Label: Independente

=== Singles ===
==== As lead artist ====
Title	Year	Album
"Born Again at Sunrise"	2009	Rise
"Até o Fim"	2011	Non-album single
"Middle of the Night"	2011	Rise
"My World"	2015	Non-album single

==== As featured artist ====
Title	Year	Album
"Revolution" (Buble Gum feat. Fantine Thó)	2016	Non-album single

=== Music videos ===
Title	Year	Director
"Até o Fim"	2011	Marco Rodrigues
"Middle Of The Night"	2011	Toni Martin
"Oceans Hillsong"	2014	Claudia Fjellström
"My World"	2016	Jean Dolabella

== Filmography ==
=== Internet ===
Year	TV show	Role	Notes
2015–16	Do Brasil	Reporter	Web-show

=== Television/documentary ===
Year	TV show	Role	Notes
2002	Popstars	Contestant (Won)	Season 1
2002	Rouge: A História	Presenter	
2003	Romeu e Julieta	Friend of Julieta	Year end special
2005	Floribella	Herself	Episode: "July 14, 2005"
2013	Fábrica de Estrelas	Herself	Episode: "The Return of the Rouge"; Episode: "Everything Is Rouge"; Episode: "Everything Again"
2013	The Voice of Holland	Contestant	Season 4

=== Films ===
Year	Film	Character
2003	Xuxa Abracadabra	Herself
2005	Eliana em O Segredo dos Golfinhos	Herself

== Tours (Fantine Tho in Concert) ==
- Living Room Concerts (2015–16)
- Chakra Journey in Concert (2019)
