= C'est La Vie (Rouge album) =

Studio album by Rouge
- Released: May 4, 2003
- Recorded: February – April 2003
- Genres: Pop; dance-pop; zouk
- Length: 51:32
- Labels: Columbia; Sony BMG
- Producer: Rick Bonadio

Rouge chronology
Rouge Remixes (2002)	C'est La Vie (2003)	A Festa dos Seus Sonhos (2003)

Singles from C'est La Vie
- 1. "Brilha La Luna" Released: May 6, 2003; 2. "Um Anjo Veio Me Falar" Released: July 8, 2003; 3. "Vem Cair na Zueira" Released: November 29, 2003

C'est La Vie (English: It's Life) is the second studio album by Brazilian girl group Rouge, released through Columbia Records on May 4, 2003. Recorded after the release of the band's majorly successful debut album, Rouge (2002), the group consulted work by frequent collaborator Rick Bonadio. The album features zouk as the main style in the songs "Brilha La Luna" and "Vem Cair na Zueira", as well as international versions such as "Eu Quero Fugir" (version for "Runaway" by The Corrs) and "C'est La Vie" (version of the song of the same name of the band B*Witched).

Commercially, the album was a success. It peaking inside the top three in Brazilian charts and was certified platinum by the Pro-Música Brasil (PMB) and has sold over 900,000 copies. Over 100,000 copies of the album were sold in just one week. The album spawned three singles, including the band's second non-consecutive number-one "Brilha La Luna", while its second single "Um Anjo Veio Me Falar" also achieving commercial success. It would remain the group's final album as a quintet after Luciana Andrade's departure in 2004, but rejoined in 2017.

== Background ==
In 2002, Rouge beat 6,000 other hopefuls in the Brazilian version of the Brazilian Television System talent show Popstars. Recruited to join a girl group, the quintet signed a recording deal with Columbia and Sony Music and became overnight hits, with their debut album Rouge emerging as the second biggest-selling album of the year 2002 in Brazil. After the success of its predecessor, C'est La Vie brought to prominence the zouk genre that already was a hit in other parts of the world, mainly in Europe. The genre has similarities with lambada and arose in the Antilles. According to the album's musical producer, Rick Bonadio, the bet was in the zouk mixed with pop. According to Luciana Andrade: "After "Ragatanga", everyone expects us to have something more to show. What we have to say is that we trust Bonadio and Sony [Music's] executivers". Patrícia Lissa points out that there was more interaction among the group's members at album, saying: "In this record, we participated in writing process with Bonadio, to help choose the songs, we heard songs that were sent." Fantine Thó commented on the album:

"Zouk has been in Brazil for a long time, but no artist has yet introduced it to the general audience. We are releasing zouk-pop, with the Rouge's brand."

The band members felt themselves under pressure to repeat the debut album's commercial success, saying: "We felt pressured, but tried not to think about it. We wanted to be true and this is what will make the album have the quality of the album's debut. If it will sell, that is a consequence."

== Recording and songs ==
"It was cool because it hape in a soft-mode. Bonadio gave the suggestion for the Lissah, she thought in context. Then she decided to talk the idea for other members of the group. We talked while Bonadio, more experienced, was guiding us. The result was cool. It's one of my favorite tracks on the album"

— Lu Andrade reflecting on the fast-paced writing process for the song "Um Anjo Veio Me Falar".
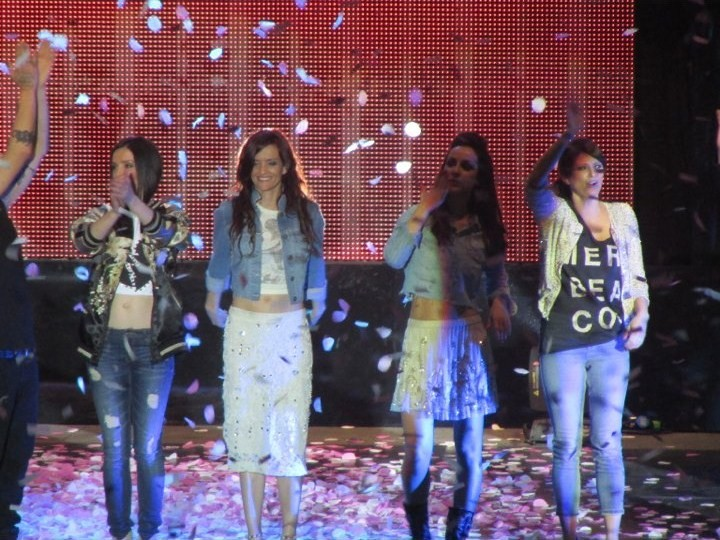
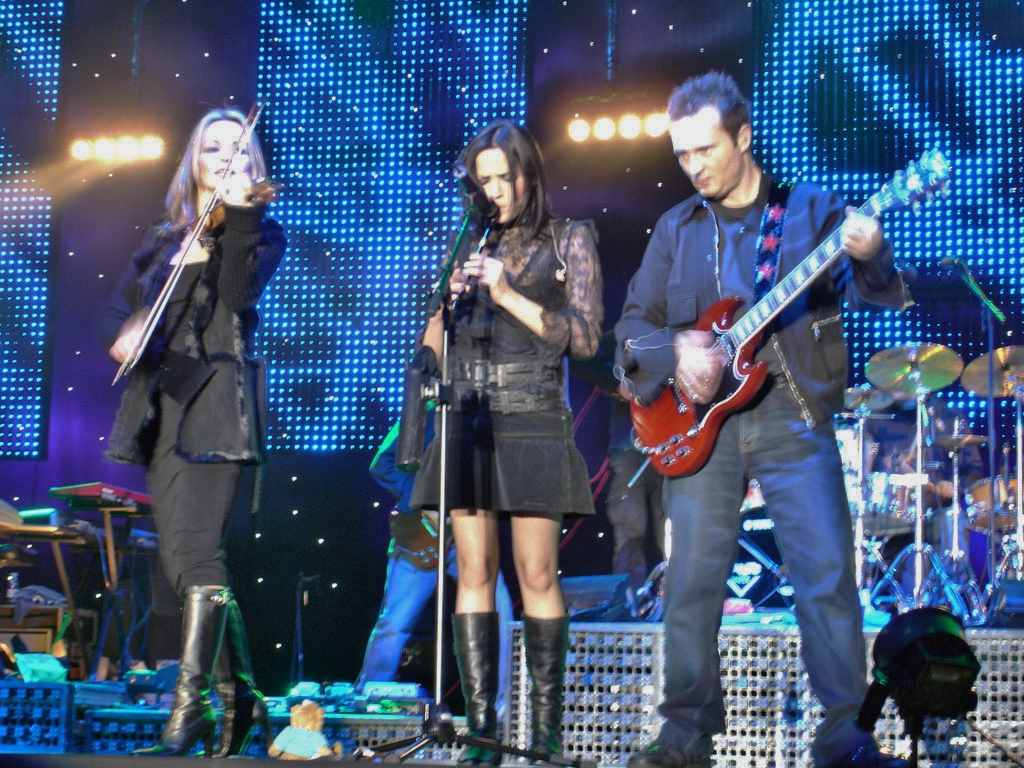
The album has several Portuguese-language versions, like "C'est La Vie" by Irish girl group B*Witched (left) and "Eu Quero Fugir" by Irish band The Corrs (right).

The C'est La Vie's songs consists mainly of Portuguese-language versions made Bonadio's of songs writes by multinacional songwhriters, like it happened in the first album. The track that opens the album, "C'est La Vie", is a Portuguese-language version of the song of the same-title by B*Witched's the Irish girl group. The version of the song for some musical critics, remember the hit "Beijo Molhado", writing by Milton Guedes. "Brilha La Luna", written by Bonadio, has a "caliente" (hot) appeal and a "pop-zouk"'s rhythm called. The song "Me Faz Feliz" is Guedes's version of the song "Heavenly." "Quando Chega a Noite" is a disco music-tinged track sing for Karin Hils the major verses. The song is a version of the song "Llega la Noche", origiginally by the Argentine girl group Bandana, formed also in Argentina's Popstars. One of the highlights of the album is the track "Um Anjo Veio Me Falar", written by members with Bonadio. The song is a Portuguese-language version of "Angel In My Heart", by the British pop band Hear'Say. The "Fantasma"'song was written by Fúlvio Márcio, who wrote some tracks from the group's self-debut album.

"Vem Cair na Zueira", also Bonadio's writing, follows the same style of "Brilha La Luna", having a zouk-tinged. "Dentro de Mim" is written by Charles Midnight, who has written songs for Joe Cocker and James Brown. According to Bonadio: "When I asked him for a lyrics for the Rouge's album, Midnight said he already knew the group and their songs, and so did all the other foreign authors we talked to". Andrade favorite songs is "Eu quero Fugir", the Portuguese version for "Runaway", hit by Irish band The Corrs. Andrade saind: "When I moved to São Paulo and started to get involved with music, my friends always said that The Corrs had everything to do with my style". Fantine Thó made her debut as a songwriter in the ballad "Um Dia Sem Você". About this song Aline Wirley further elaborated: "I used to sing more R&B's ballads and even rap, but my favorite album track have a pop rock-oriented". In this song, Wirley and Thó sings lead on the verses and bridge, while the other members sing the chorus. Andrade and Bonadio also written the track "Abra o Seu Coração".

== Spanish version ==
A version of the album "C'est La Vie" was recorded in Spanish, to be released the same year. But with the departure of the member Luciana, the CD and the project of the 4th DvD ended up being canceled. The edition of the album "C'est La Vie" in Spanish, includes versions of songs of the own and some of the first album. The song "Um anjo veio me falar", also won, in addition to the Spanish version, a music video, which was even comrecializado, where still today, has access. In 2012, it was recorded that the songs of the album leaked on the Internet and discovered by YouTube.

== Track listing ==
All songs producer by Rick Bonadio
No.	Title	Writer(s)	Length
1.	"C'est La Vie" (C'est La Vie)	Tracy Ackerman; Martin Brannigan; B*Witched; Ray Hedges; version: Milton Guedes	2:54
2.	"Brilha La Luna"	Rick Bonadio	3:31
3.	"Me Faz Feliz" (Heavenly)	Pelle Ankarberg; version: Guedes	3:22
4.	"Quando Chega A Noite" (Llega La Noche)	Fernando Lopez Rossi; Afo Verde; Pablo Durand; version: Fúlvio Márcio	3:13
5.	"Um Anjo Veio Me Falar" (Angel In My Heart)	Eliot Kennedy; Tim Woodcock; Suzanne Shaw; version: Bonadio; Aline Wirley; Fantine Thó; Karin Hils; Li Martins; Luciana Andrade	4:13
6.	"Fantasma" (Demon)	Lars Edvall; Mattias Reimer; version: Márcio	3:19
7.	"Vem Cair na Zueira"	Bonadio	3:24
8.	"Dentro De Mim" (Underneath My Skin)	Eric Silver; Charles Midnight; version: Andrade	3:37
9.	"Eu Quero Fugir" (Runaway)	Andrea Corr; Caroline Corr; Sharon Corr; version: Bonadio	4:30
10.	"Delírio" (Delirious)	Anthony Anderson; Steve Smith; Dane DeViller; Sean Hosein; version: Márcio	3:59
11.	"Um Dia Sem Você"	Thó	4:05
12.	"Abra O Seu Coração"	Bonadio; Andrade	3:45
13.	"Diz Aí Felicidade" (Having Fun)	Bonadio; Beto Paciello; Márcio	3:53
14.	"Vamos Mudar O Mundo" (Cambiar El Mundo)	Alejandro Lerner; version: Bonadio	4:22
Total length:			51:32

== Awards ==
The album was a success in the awards, being indicated to 9 different prizes, being indicated the total to 16, and winning 13 prizes. The song "Brilha La Luna" won the awards for Best Music at "Capricho Awards", "Meus Prêmios Nick", "Trophy" Universal Musical Trophy, "Musical Universe" and the "Zero Magazine Award". The band also won the "Multishow Brazilian Music Award" in the Best Group category. The DVD A Festa dos Seus Sonhos, also received 2 awards, in "Capricho Awards 2004" and "Troféu Universo Musical 2004", in addition to being nominated to the "Multishow Award of Brazilian Music" in the category "Best DVD".

Year	Awards ceremony	Award	Results
2003	Capricho Awards 2003	Best Music for "Brilha la Luna"	Won
2003	Meus Prêmios Nick 2003	Best Music (Brilha La Luna)	Won
2003	Meus Prêmios Nick 2003	Best Music Video (Brilha La Luna)	Won
2003	Multishow Brazilian Music Award	Group revelation	Won
2003	Multishow Brazilian Music Award	Best DVD for A Festa dos Seus Sonhos	Nominated
2003	Troféu Universo Musical	Best Album (C'est La Vie)	Won
2003	Troféu Universo Musical	Best Song (Brilha La Luna)	Won
2004	Capricho Awards 2004	Best Song "Um Anjo Veio Me Falar"	Won
2004	Capricho Awards 2004	Best DVD (A Festa dos Seus Sonhos)	Won
2004	MTV Video Music Brasil	Audience Selection (Brilha la Luna)	Nominated
2004	Prêmio Academia Brasileira de Letras	Best band	Won
2004	Prêmio Miscelânea Design (ABRE)	Best Album	Won
2004	Prêmio Revista Zero	Best Song (Brilha la Luna)	Won
2004	Troféu Universo Musical 2004	Best Song (Um Anjo Veio Me Falar)	Won
2004	Troféu Universo Musical 2004	Best DVD A Festa dos Seus Sonhos	Won

== Charts ==
=== Weekly charts ===
Chart (2003)	Peak position
Brazilian Albums (Hits)	3

=== Year-end charts ===
Chart (2003)	Position
Brazil (Pro-Música Brasil)	17

== Certifications ==
Region	Certification	Certified units/sales
Brazil (Pro-Música Brasil)	Platinum	900,000

== See also ==
- List of best-selling girl group albums in Brazil
