= Brilha La Luna =

Song by the Brazilian girl

Single by Rouge

from the album C'est La Vie
- Released: May 6, 2003
- Recorded: 2003
- Genre: Latin pop; dance-pop; zouk
- Length: 3:31
- Label: Columbia; Sony
- Songwriter: Rick Bonadio
- Producer: Rick Bonadio

Rouge singles chronology
"Beijo Molhado" (2003)	"Brilha La Luna" (2003)	"Um Anjo Veio Me Falar" (2003)

Music video
- "Brilha La Luna" on YouTube

"Brilha la Luna" (lit. "Shine the Moon") is a song by the Brazilian pop girl group Rouge, from their second studio album C'est La Vie (2003). The song was released by Columbia Records as the album's lead single on May 6, 2003. It was written and produced by Rick Bonadio, a mix of dance-pop and zouk heavily influenced by Latin music. "Brilha la Luna" has verses in Spanish, and in many cases, Portuñol. The member Luciana Andrade sings lead on the verses and bridge with the other members singing only the high harmony on the pre-chorus and second chorus. After Andrade's departure, the verses Luciana sang were performed by Karin Hils and Fantine Thó, respectively.

"Brilha la Luna" received positive reviews from music critics who found the song similar to "Ragatanga" and predicted that it would achieve the same level of success as that song. The video was well received, receiving the "Best Music Video" award in My 2003 Nick Award and an indication to MTV Video Music Brasil 2003. "Brilha la Luna" was commercially successful in Brazil, peaking at number 1 for one week.

Part of the song's music video was recorded at Botanical Garden of São Paulo, and another part of a studio, with the same costumes as the album insert. "Brilha la Luna" was performed many times on television. The group has performed the song on their five tours, from the Brilha la Tour (2003), Blá Blá Blá Tour, Mil e Uma Noites Tour (2005), Chá Rouge Tour (2017) and 15 Anos Tour (2018).

== Background and release ==
Following the success of their debut album, Rouge (2002), which sold more than 2 million copies, and the hit "Ragatanga", which was at the top of the charts for over two months, Sony Music decided the group would release a new studio album following the same format of the first album, with the difference of bringing a new style for the group.

For that, the zouk rhythm that was already present in the musical scene mainly in Europe was incorporated into the album. The rhythm is similar to lambada and it originates from Antilles. The song was released in April 2003.

Fantine Thó, also a member of the group, commented on the new work:

Zouk has been in Brazil for a long time, but no artist has yet introduced it to the general public. We are launching pop zouk with Rouge's particular style.

A version sung entirely in Spanish, titled "Brilla la Luna", was made for the album Rouge En Español, but the album was not released due to the departure of Luciana Andrade from the group. Even so, the song was released on the internet.

=== Composition and lyrics ===
"Brilha la Luna" was written and produced by Rick Bonadio, a mix of dance-pop and zouk heavily influenced by Latin music. It has verses in Spanish (mira que bella), and even Portuñol/Portunhol (una bela luna siempre vai brilhar) (a beautiful moon will always shine). The member Luciana Andrade sings lead on the verses and bridge with the other members singing only the high harmony on the pre-chorus and second chorus. The song begins with all the girls singing, "Quero uma noite pra bailar o zouk, Um grande amor e um belo luar..." (I want a night to dance the zouk, A great love and a beautiful moonlight ...). In the pre-chorus, Luciana sings, "Quero tanto estar contigo só mais uma vez, E poder bailar o zouk como a primeira vez." (I want so much to be with you just one more time), and to be able to dance zouk like the first time." In the chorus, they all sing, "Brilha la luna, oh, oh, oh, Mira que bela Brilha la luna, oh, oh, oh Una bela luna siempre vai brilhar." (The moon shines, oh, oh, oh, Look how beautiful the moon shines, oh, oh, oh A beautiful moon will always shine). In the bridge of the song, the girls sing, "Hala ban hala ban hala bin bin bun ban Hala hala ban hala bin hala bun."

=== Critical response ===
Denis Moreira from the Diário de São Paulo newspaper said that "Brilha la Luna" has the same Caribbean accent as "Ragatanga", albeit with some differences. He also stated that the song is "lambada-like." Fernanda Castello Branco from Terra said that the song "promises to follow the same path of success that was Ragatanga."

== Live performances ==
The song was performed many times on television, including on Gugu's TV show. The group also went to the Bom Dia & Cia children's show, where they had an entire week of the show (Monday to Friday) dedicated to the girls, who sang old and new hits such as "Ragatanga", "Brilha La Luna" and an acapella version of "Um Anjo Veio Me Falar". The group also gave interviews to TV host Jackeline Petkovic, who also learned the choreographies of the song. They also went to Falando Francamente, hosted by Sônia Abrão, and sang "Brilha la Luna", "Um Anjo Veio Me Falar", as well as an excerpt from the unreleased song "Um Dia Sem Você", as requested by a fan.

The band also went to Sabadaço and performed the singles "Brilha la Luna" and "Um Anjo Veio Me Falar", in addition to the title track "C'est La Vie." The girls also promoted the album on Hebe's show, in addition to participating in the following TV shows: Eliana, É Show, Pânico na TV, Dia Dia, Melhor da Tarde and Chat Show Terra. After leaving Luciana, a new version of the song was made, to replace the two verses sung by her, Karin Hils and Fantine Thó, respectively, replaced the verses of the former member. The group has performed the song on their five tours, from the Brilha la Tour (2003), Blá Blá Blá Tour, Mil e Uma Noites Tour (2005), Chá Rouge Tour (2017) and 15 Anos Tour (2018).

== Music video ==
In May, the group announced they would record part of the "Brilha La Luna" music video at the Botanical Garden of São Paulo and another part in a studio, with the same costumes as the CD insert. The music video consists of a combination of the two sets in addition to the choreography.

The video for "Brilha la Luna" was nominated for MTV Video Music Brasil 2003 in the "Audience Choice" category and won the "Best Music Video" award in "Meus Prêmios Nick 2003."

=== Awards and nominations ===
"Brilha La Luna" won several awards. The song won the "Best Music" awards at "Capricho Awards", "Meus Prêmios Nick", "Universal Musical Trophy" and the "Zero Magazine Award."

=== Awards ===
Year	Awards ceremony	Award	Results
2003	MTV Video Music Brasil	Audience Selection	Nominated

== Track listings ==
CD Single

1. "Brilha La Luna"

== Charts ==
"Brilha la Luna" was commercially successful in the Brazil, peaking at number 1 for one week.

Chart (2003)	Peak position
Brazil (Brasil Hot 100 Airplay)	1
