= Rouge (Rouge album) =

Studio album by Rouge
- Released: August 19, 2002
- Recorded: 2002
- Genre: Pop; dance-pop
- Length: 50:39
- Language: Portuguese; Spanish
- Label: Columbia; Sony BMG
- Producer: Rick Bonadio

Rouge chronology
Rouge (2002)	O Sonho de Ser Uma Popstar (2002)

Singles from Rouge
- 1. "Não Dá pra Resistir" Released: August 19, 2002; 2. "Ragatanga" Released: August 31, 2002; 3. "Beijo Molhado" Released: January 19, 2003

Rouge is the self-titled debut studio album by Brazilian pop girl group of the same name, formed on SBT TV show the Popstars. It was released on August 19, 2002, by Columbia Records and Sony BMG. As executive producer, Rick Bonadio produced each of the fourteen tracks on the record. The album counts on nine versions of international songs and the participation of trio KLB in one of the tracks. Its music incorporates pop and dance-pop, in songs that talk about fame, love, domination and the power of dreams.

Rouge produced three singles, "Não Dá pra Resistir", "Beijo Molhado" and "Ragatanga". All three singles made appearances in the Brazilian charts. "Ragatanga" became the album's most successful single, boosted sales of the album and the group's career. This song winning the audience with their unusual lyrics and dancing and accumulated 11 weeks at number one in Brazil charts.

Commercially, the album was a success, topped the Brazil's charts for ten weeks. It was later certified double platinum by the Pro-Música Brasil (PMB) and currently stands as best-selling album by a girl group in the Brazil (with sales of 2 million copies). To promote the album, the group embarked on the Popstar Tour, as well as having recorded the DVD O Sonho de Ser Uma Popstar.

== Background ==
On March 1, 2002, SBT announced that they were looking for girls between the ages of 18 and 25, who could sing and dance for a chance to become a "popstar", the name of the reality show. Professionals in the music industry would choose the best candidates in several stages, going through a rigorous selection to form a pop girl group. The show Popstars, a co-production of SBT and RGB in partnership with Sony Music, received 30,000 entries from girls aged 18 to 25 from all over Brazil. In the first round, 6,000 girls were chosen, and on the second round, they were cut down to 2,000.

Popstars had 20 episodes. They were broadcast every Saturday on SBT, and during the week, a one-minute newsletter was displayed at the same time as the weekly attraction at 7:45 p.m. Sony Music was responsible for the release of the album, music video and concerts. The panel was formed by the producer Liminha, vice president of marketing of Sony Music in Brazil, Alexandre Schiavo, music producer Rick Bonadio, singer Iara Negrete and choreographer Ivan Santos. When they were down to 20 candidates, the girls had to learn the debut single of the group, "Não Dá pra Resistir". The 20 candidates also had to divide into groups to perform the song. In the group "Barish Bashan" were Karin Hils and Fantine Thó, whereas in the group "Ethnic" were Patrícia Lissa, Luciana Andrade and Aline Wirley. The first members of the group were Karin and Patricia, being the first to be called. Soon after, Fantine, Luciana and Aline were also summoned, thus forming the group "Rouge", name chosen by the members themselves, who among some options given, found that in addition to having five members and also because in French it means red, it is associated color to sensuality ... and it's pop! ".

== Recording and Songs ==
Amid the eliminations and tests to continue in the program, the group's first album, which had no name yet, was already being recorded. The song "Nunca Deixa de Sonhar" was recorded by the trio KLB with the aim of showing that everyone should go after their dreams. Thus, Kiko told that the girls would record the song with them and that the song would be part of the first disc of the "PopStars". The album counts with fourteen tracks, being 9 versions of international songs, and the other 5 compositions of Rick Bonadio, in partnership with other composers. Bonadio emphasized the participation of the Popstars in the vocal arrangements, saying: "They contributed a lot, choosing who would sing what." Liminha went to a meeting with Sony representatives from around the world and commented that she needed a repertoire for a group that would launch in Brazil, receiving from Spain the song "Ragatanga", sung by a group called Las Ketchup. From there, Bonadio made a version and turned it into Ragatanga, a key hit that says unrelated words adopted by children. "The secret of a good version is to have fidelity to the original, not to try to invent," Minister Bonadio.

But the music that drove their success to heights, however, almost did not come on the album. "The list of songs was ready when I heard about 'Ragatanga,'" Schiavo said. The chorus of the song, "Aserehe ra de re De hebe tu de hebere seibiunouba mahabi" does not mean anything. that the people who do not know English usually sing "Thing that the adolescents of the Ketchup invented", it counts.The Brazilian version has a mixture of Spanish and Portuguese. The song "Não Dá Pra Resistir" is a version of Milton Guedes for the song "Irresistible" by Frederik Thomander and sung by Nikki Cleary. The album also brings other romantic ballads full of lyrics talking about youthful passions.

== Release and promotion ==
After the recording of the Rouge, the group performed for the first time in the Domingo Legal, hosted by Gugu Liberato on August 18, 2002. It following releasing the album on the next day, August 19. On the same day, the girls were presented to the press, debuting the "Não Dá pra Resistir"'s music video. The album, also was released in Argentina, Chile and Peru. In the Popstars on August 31, the girls were shown recording the song "Ragatanga", as well as showing the group making their first pocket show, at the Parque Dom Pedro Shopping in Campinas, São Paulo, drew a crowd of over 10,000 audience. On August 31, they performed the first live performance, in Via Funchal, one of the biggest concert halls in São Paulo. "Hoje Eu Sei", was inserted as a soundtrack to SBT's soap opera Jamais Te Esquecerei (2003). The "Não Dá Pra Resistir" was also the soundtrack of SBT's soap opera Pequena Travessa. The band first concert tour, the Popstar Tour, kicked off on December 14, 2002. A VHS release of the group's performance at Via Funchal, titled O Sonho de Ser Uma Popstar, was released in November 2002. Also, their first remix album, titled Rouge Remixes, was released in February 2003 and included remixes of several tracks from Rouge.

== Singles ==
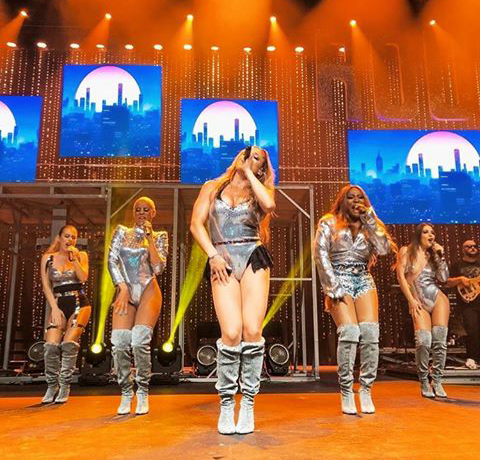
The group during Rouge 15 Anos tour performing "Beijo Molhado".

During the preparation of the group on the show Popstars, Sony Music's intention was to release the song "Não Dá pra Resistir" as the debut single. In the show of July 6, 2002, the 24 candidates received the song for rehearsal. On August 19, the group performed for the debut time with the "No Dá pra Resistir" music video, and the next day the song was sent to the radio as the album's lead single. According to Sony Music, the intention was to make the song reach the top of the charts. The song became a hit in Brazil, reaching also figure in the Argentina charts, reaching the position number 10.

"Ragatanga" was released as the album's second single. Due to the success of its version made by the Spanish girl group Las Ketchup, the label saw in "Ragatanga" a hit, and released quickly. The song became greatest hit of the album, topped the Brazilian Singles Chart for 11 weeks. Months after "Ragatanga" lose arplay on the radio, The fourth and final single from Rouge, the song "Beijo Molhado", released as a single summer on 19 January 2003. In February, the song reached the fourth position in the ranking of the most played songs in Brazil.

== Commercial performance ==
Rouge selling 100,000 copies in its first week. According to the record company Sony Music, in less than three months the album had already sold more than 700 thousand copies, made rare in the time of the piracy. The album peaked at number one on the Brazilian Albums Chart while "Ragatanga" topped Brazilian Singles Chart, making the band simultaneously top the charts albums and singles. In total, the album spent 10 consecutive weeks charted at the top of the Brazilian Albums Chart and was eventually certified 2× platinum by the Pro-Música Brasil indicating sales in excess of 500,000 copies. It was the second highest-selling album of 2002 in Brazil. The album has sold a total of 2 million copies, becoming the most successful girl group album in Brazilian music history as well as one of the biggest-selling products to emerge from the Popstars reality television franchise.

== Track listing ==
All songs producer by Rick Bonadio
No.	Title	Writer(s)	Length
1.	"Popstar"	Rick Bonadio; Jaqueline Vargas	3:42
2.	"Não Dá pra Resistir" (Irresistible)	Kara Dioguardi; Fredrik Thomander; Anders Wikström; version: Milton Guedes	2:57
3.	"Ragatanga" (Aserejé) (feat. Las Ketchup)	Francisco Manuel Ruiz Gomez; version: Bonadio	3:22
4.	"Beijo Molhado" (Strawberry Kisses)	Andy Marvel; Jeff Franzel; Marjorie Maye; version: Guedes	3:30
5.	"Hoje Eu Sei" (Just Another Day)	Franne Golde; Guy Roche; Jeanette Jurado; version: Bonadio	4:13
6.	"Sou o Que Sou" (Say the Word)	Tony Bruno; Pam Sheyne; version: Bonadio and Fúlvio Márcio	3:27
7.	"1000 Segredos" (Come to Me)	Eliot Kennedy; Wendy Page; Jim Marr; Jörgen Elofsson; version: Márcio	3:26
8.	"O Que o Amor Me Faz" (I Will Be Your Friend)	Dane DeViller; Sean Hosein; Michelle Lewis; version: Bonadio; Júlia Nascimento	3:37
9.	"Depois Que Tudo Mudou"	Bonadio; Fernando Lopez Rossi; Pablo Durand	3:25
10.	"Deve Ser Amor" (That's What Love is Like)	Kennedy; Mark Cawley; Jodi Albert; Anika Bostelaar; Michelle Barber; Linzi Martin; Nikki Stuart; version: Dudu Falcão	3:51
11.	"Quero Estar com Você" (I Want to Be There)	Eric Silver; Stephanie Bentley; version: Bonadio and Márcio	3:05
12.	"Olha Só"	Bonadio; Rossi; Durand	4:01
13.	"Te Deixo Tocar"	Bonadio; Adriana Maciel	3:51
14.	"Nunca Deixe de Sonhar" (El Poder de los Sueños) (feat. KLB)	Alejandro Lerner; version: Piska	3:51
Total length:			50:39

== Charts ==
=== Weekly charts ===
Chart (2002)	Peak position
Brazilian Albums (Hits)	1

=== Year-end charts ===
Chart (2002)	Position
Brazil (Pro-Música Brasil)	2

== Certifications ==
Region	Certification	Certified units/sales
Brazil (Pro-Música Brasil)	2× Platinum	2,000,000

== See also ==
- List of best-selling girl group albums in Brazil
