= Rick Bonadio =

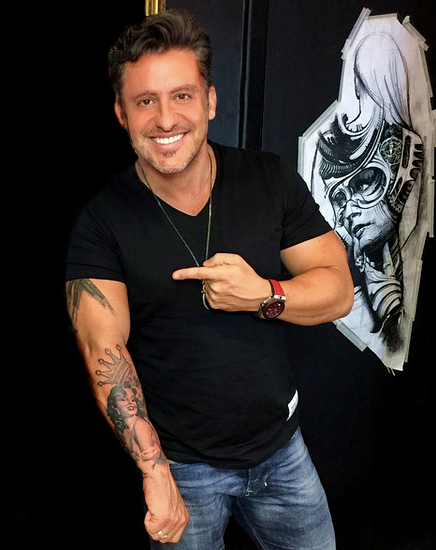
- Rick Bonadio in 2016.

Background information
- Born: Ricardo Bonadio; June 21, 1969 (age 56); São Paulo, São Paulo, Brazil
- Genres: Pop; rock; Christian music; hip-hop
- Occupations: Songwriter; record producer; multi-instrumentalist
- Instruments: Guitar; drums; keyboards
- Years active: 1989–present
- Labels: Sony BMG; Columbia; Virgin; Universal; Gospel Records; EMI; Arsenal Music; Indie Records; Midas Music

Ricardo "Rick" Bonadio (born June 21, 1969) is a Brazilian music producer, songwriter, multi-instrumentalist and sound engineer, owner of Midas Studio and record companies Arsenal Music and Midas Music.

== Career ==
He began his career in the 1980s as a musician and arranger. He opened Bonadio Produções, a small studio. In 1989, he partnered with Nando, with whom he started a rap duo, Rick & Nando. They released a vinyl record in 1989, which was considered one of the first rap albums in Brazil. In the 90's, he began to excel at working with Christian rock musicians such as the band Katsbarnea and their lead singer, Brother Simion. In 1991, he worked as a keyboardist and sound engineer on the album Vida, Jesus & Rock'n'Roll, from the band Resgate. At this time, he worked as a producer on Brother Simion's disc, which was considered the 41st greatest album of Brazilian Christian music by several historians, musicians, and journalists in a publication. He was the producer who discovered, produced and hosted Mamonas Assassinas, and since then has become one of the most requested musical producers in Brazil. Bonadio was nicknamed Creuzebek by the band. The musician also worked for several years in partnership with producers Paulo Anhaia and Rodrigo Castanho.

Shortly thereafter, he released and produced the band Charlie Brown Jr. and continued working with other multinational artists in his studio.

In addition to music producer and composer, he was also a judge on the Popstars TV show on SBT, which had two seasons. In the first one, released in 2002, the female pop band Rouge was formed. The band was extinguished at the end of 2005. The second season, released in 2003, revealed the male pop band Br'oZ. Still on television, he was a musical producer on Olha a Minha Banda, from Caldeirão do Huck, on Rede Globo, where his goal was to help beginner bands reach stardom. Between 1998 and 2002, Bonadio was the artistic and head director of the Brazilian division of the record company Virgin Records, whose Brazilian operation was later absorbed by EMI Music. In 2001, shortly before leaving office, he created the record label Arsenal Music, responsible for bands such as Fresno, NX Zero, Tihuana, CPM 22 and Hateen, among others. The label's catalog was distributed by Sony Music between 2001 and 2005, when the operation was taken over by Universal Music.

In 2011, he was a judge alongside Luiza Possi and Marco Camargo on Ídolos, exhibited on Rede Record. In 2012, he sold Arsenal Music to Universal Music. The label's former artists were then transferred to the new parent company. In the same year, Rick created his own new label, Midas Music. In 2013, the musical reality show Fábrica de Estrellas premiered at Multishow. It showed what a day in the life of the producer was like, as well as his work with great artists and also a dispute between new singers for the formation of a girlband: The Girls group. He was jury of Ídolos 2011, next to Luiza Possi and Marco Camargo.

He is currently a judge and a producer on the Brazilian version of X Factor. He is still the head director of Midas Music and Studio Midas, one of the largest studios in Latin America.

== Personal life ==
The son of a seamstress and an auto parts store owner, Rick was married to Suseth Marcellon, with whom he has two children, Gabriela and Leonardo. He is currently married to the choreographer Paula Peixoto Bonadio.

== Productions ==
=== Albums ===
- 1989 : Rick e Nando - Rick e Nando
- 1991: Vida, Jesus & Rock'n'Roll - Resgate
- 1992: Brother - Brother Simion
- 1992: Cristo ou Barrabás - Katsbarnea
- 1993: Novos Rumos - Resgate
- 1994: Esperança - Brother Simion
- 1995: Mamonas Assassinas - Mamonas Assassinas
- 1997: Transpiração Contínua Prolongada - Charlie Brown Jr.
- 1998: Atenção, Creuzebek: a Baixaria Continua! - Mamonas Assassinas
- 1998: Rodolfo & ET - ET & Rodolfo
- 1999: Preço Curto... Prazo Longo - Charlie Brown Jr.
- 1999: Los Hermanos - Los Hermanos
- 2000: Praise - Resgate
- 2000: Todo Mundo Doido - O Surto
- 2002: Rouge - Rouge
- 2002: Rouge Remixes - Rouge
- 2002: Eu Sou Assim - Luiza Possi
- 2002: Eu Continuo de Pé - Resgate
- 2003: C'est La Vie - Rouge
- 2003: Br'oz - Br'oz
- 2003: Aqui ou em Qualquer Lugar - Tihuana
- 2003: Tudo Outra Vez - LS Jack
- 2004: Pro Mundo Levar - Luiza Possi
- 2004: Segundo Ato - Br'oz
- 2004: Blá Blá Blá - Rouge
- 2004: Acústico MTV - Ira!
- 2004: Iara Negrete Canta Divas - Acústico - Iara Negrete
- 2004: Tamo Aí na Atividade - Charlie Brown Jr.
- 2005: Imunidade Musical - Charlie Brown Jr.
- 2005: Tihuana - Tihuana
- 2005: Mil e Uma Noites - Rouge
- 2006: Cidade Cinza - CPM 22
- 2006: NX Zero - NX Zero
- 2006: Rastaclone - Rastaclone
- 2006: Vou Tirar Você Desse Lugar: Tributo a Odair José - Many artists
- 2006: Procedimentos de Emergência - Hateen
- 2006: Um Dia de Cada Vez - Tihuana
- 2006: Vicious - Supla
- 2006: Eu Sou 300 - Sérgio Britto
- 2007: MTV ao Vivo - 5 Bandas de Rock - Many artists
- 2007: Invisível DJ - Ira!
- 2007: Country Star - Nathalia Siqueira
- 2008: Redenção - Fresno
- 2008: Agora - NX Zero
- 2008: Ao Vivo - Nathalia Siqueira
- 2008: O que se Leva da Vida, é a Vida que se Leva - Tulio Dek
- 2009: Gloria - Gloria
- 2009: One: 16 Hits - Mamonas Assassinas
- 2009: Sete Chaves - NX Zero
- 2009: Sacos Plásticos - Titãs
- 2009: Camisa 10 Joga Bola Até na Chuva - Charlie Brown Jr.
- 2010: Hiperativo - Strike
- 2010: Projeto Paralelo - NX Zero
- 2010: Fake Number - Fake Number
- 2010: Manu Gavassi - Manu Gavassi
- 2010: Revanche - Fresno
- 2011: Multishow Ao Vivo: Nx Zero 10 anos - NX Zero
- 2011: Rebeldes - Rebeldes
- 2011: Pelados em Santos - Mamonas Assassinas
- 2012: Julie e os Fantasmas - Cast of Julie e os Fantasmas
- 2012: Rebeldes - Ao vivo - Rebeldes
- 2012: Tudo de Novo - Negra Li
- 2012: Meu Jeito, Seu Jeito - Rebeldes
- 2013: Em Comum - NX Zero
- 2013: Clichê Adolescente - Manu Gavassi
- 2013: De Sol a Sol / Bora Viver - Planta & Raiz
- 2013: Girls - Girls
- 2017: Maravilhosa - Ravena
- 2017: Kell Smith - Kell Smith

== Filmography ==
Television
Year	Title	Role	Notes
2002–2003	Popstars	Coach / Mentor	
2008–09	Caldeirão do Huck	Coach / Mentor	Picture: Look at My Band
2011	Ídolos	Coach / Mentor	Temporada 6
2013	Fábrica de Estrelas	Coach / Mentor	
2016	X Factor	Coach / Mentor	
