= Rouge Sessions - De Portas Abertas =

EP by Rouge
- Released: February 4, 2019
- Recorded: January 17, 2019
- Studio: Alto da Boa Vista, Rio de Janeiro
- Genre: Acoustic
- Length: 18:04
- Label: Sony Music

Rouge chronology
Les 5inq (2019)	Rouge Sessions - De Portas Abertas (2019)

Rouge Sessions - De Portas Abertas (transl. Rouge Sessions - Doors Open) is the second extended play (EP) of the Brazilian girl group Rouge, released on February 4, 2019 by Sony Music, being the last work of the group before the breaking. The acoustic, recorded at the home of member Aline Wirley in Tijuca Forest, Rio de Janeiro, will also feature videos of the songs being posted on the group's YouTube channel on the same day. The visual EP follows the band's fifth studio album, Les 5inq, released three days earlier, and features five songs from the group in acoustic versions, among them old hits like "Ragatanga" and "Um Anjo Veio Me Falar", and such as "Bailando" and "Solo Tu".

== Background ==
After the release of extended play 5 in October 2018, the group went on to finish the group's fifth album. In the meantime, the band did an action in the application of streaming Spotify to select the second single of the project, with the track "Solo Tu" being chosen. With the release of the music video for the song, there were strong rumors that the girl group would split up and that "the new album should only be delivered due to contractual issues with the label and the work as a girl group shut down." Less than a week after the rumors, on January 24, 2019, the band issued an official statement announcing that the group would go on hiatus indefinitely. In the midst of the announcement, the girls announced the release of their fifth album, Les 5inq, on February 1, 2019, and the Rouge Sessions, an acoustic video tape recorded at the home of member Aline Wirley in Tijuca Forest, Rio de Janeiro of January.

== Track listing ==
No.	Title	Writer(s)	Length
1.	"Bailando"	Umberto Tavares; Jefferson Junior; Fantine Thó	3:31
2.	"Não Dá pra Resistir"	Kara DioGuardi; Frederik Thomander; Anders Wikström; Milton Guedes	3:24
3.	"Solo Tu"	Emy Perez; Thó; Rino Sambo; Dan Valbusa; Youri de Bruijn; Marcelinho Ferraz; Joey Mattos	3:19
4.	"Um Anjo Veio Me Falar"	Eliot Kennedy; Suzanne Shaw; Tim Woodcock; Aline Wirley; Thó; Karin Hils; Luciana Andrade; Li Martins; Rick Bonadio	3:52
5.	"Ragatanga"	Manuel Ruiz; Bonadio	3:42
Total length:			18:04
