= Jão discography =

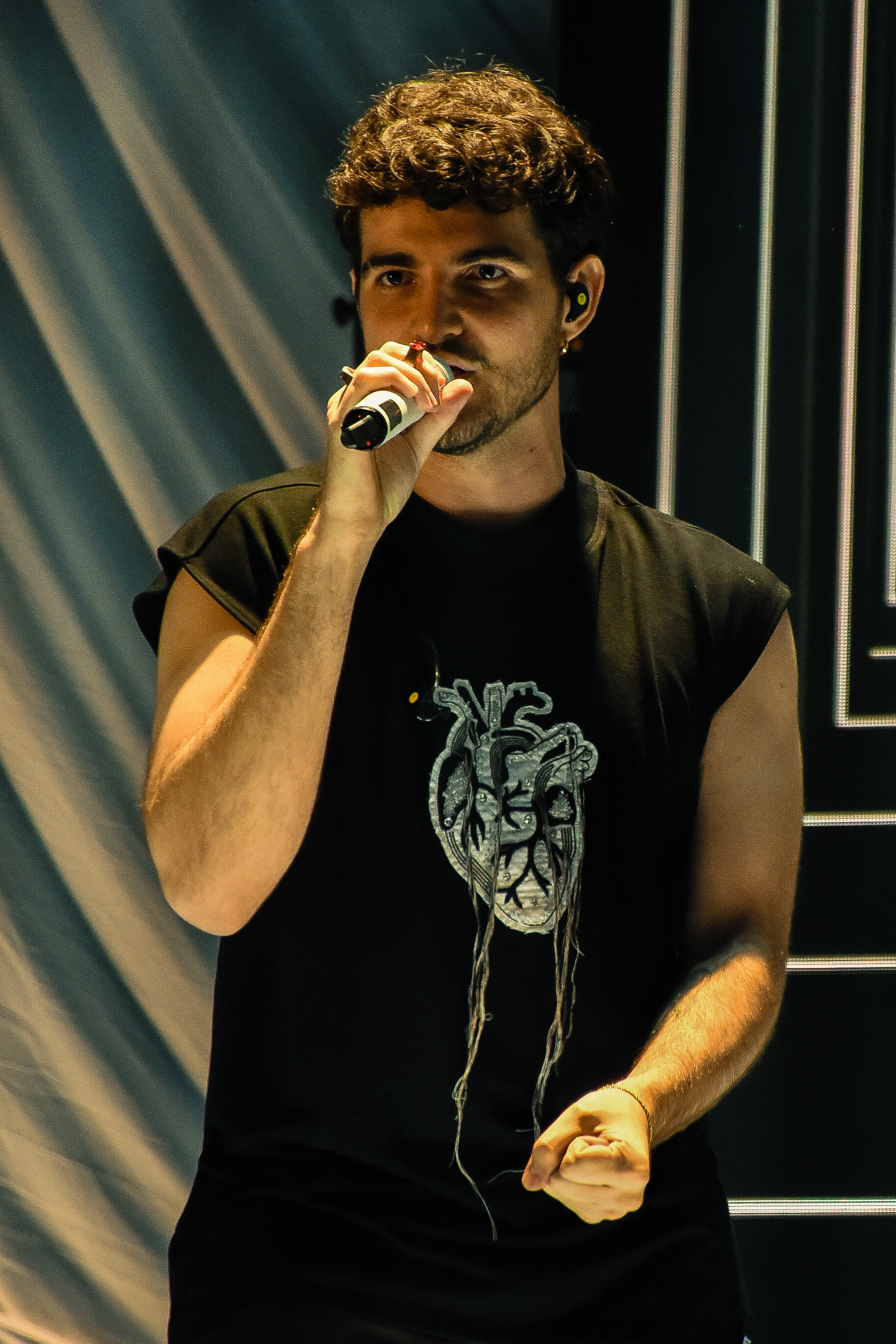
- Jão performing during Turnê Anti-Herói tour (2019)
- Studio albums: 4
- EPs: 1
- Live albums: 1
- Singles: 19
- Music videos: 17
- Promotional singles: 8

The Brazilian singer-songwriter Jão has released four studio albums, one extended play (EP), 19 singles (including two as a featured artist), and 8 promotional singles.

In 2016, Jão was discovered by producers Pedro Dash and Marcelinho Ferraz with his covers posted on the video-sharing platform YouTube. He eventually signed with Head Media, a label of the Universal Music Group. Jão's debut single, "Dança pra Mim", with Pedrowl, was released in November of that year. His debut four-track acoustic extended play (EP), Primeiro Acústico, was released on 1 June 2018. Jão released his debut studio album, Lobos, on 17 August 2018. The album spawned two singles: "Vou Morrer Sozinho" and "Me Beija com Raiva", and included "Imaturo", which was a commercial success and reached number one on the Spotify Viral Brazil chart. His second studio album, Anti-Herói, was released on 10 October 2019. The album spawned two singles: "Enquanto Me Beija" and "Essa Eu Fiz pro Nosso Amor". On 28 July 2020, Jão released his first live album, Turnê Anti-Herói (Ao Vivo). He released his third studio album, Pirata, on 19 October 2021. Its lead single, "Coringa", became his first solo entry on the Top 100 Brasil Airplay chart by Crowley Broadcast Analysis. It was followed by the singles "Não Te Amo" and "Idiota". "Idiota" was a commercial success, reaching number 23 on the Billboard Brazil Songs and 17 on the singles chart in Portugal. Jão released his fourth studio album, Super, on 14 August 2023. It broke the record for the biggest debut for an album in the history of Spotify Brazil, surpassing Taylor Swift's Midnights. (Note: The record was surpassed by Luísa Sonza's Escândalo Íntimo on 31 August 2023.) Its lead single, "Me Lambe", reached number 48 on the Billboard Brasil Hot 100.

== Albums ==
=== Studio albums ===
List of studio albums, with selected details and certifications
Title	Album details	Certifications
Lobos	Released: 17 August 2018; Label: Universal; Formats: CD, LP, digital download, streaming	PMB: 2× Platinum
Anti-Herói	Released: 10 October 2019; Label: Universal; Formats: CD, LP, digital download, streaming	PMB: Platinum
Pirata	Released: 19 October 2021; Label: Universal; Formats: CD, LP, digital download, streaming	PMB: 2× Platinum
Super	Released: 14 August 2023; Label: Universal; Formats: Digital download, streaming	

=== Live albums ===
List of live albums with selected details
Title	Album details
Turnê Anti-Herói (Ao Vivo)	Released: 28 July 2020; Label: Universal; Formats: Digital download, streaming

== Extended plays ==
List of extended plays with selected details
Title	EP details
Primeiro Acústico	Released: 1 June 2018; Label: Universal; Formats: Digital download, streaming

== Singles ==
=== As lead artist ===
List of singles as lead artist, showing year released, selected chart positions, certifications, and associated album
Title	Year	Peak chart positions				Certifications	Album
Title	Year	BRA Airplay	BRA Billb.	BRA Pop Airplay	POR	Certifications	Album
"Dança pra Mim" (with Pedrowl)	2016	—	—	—	—		Non-album single
"Álcool"	2017	—	—	—	—		Non-album single
"Ressaca"	2017	—	—	—	—	PMB: Platinum	Lobos
"Imaturo"	2018	—	—	—	—	PMB: 3× Platinum	Lobos
"Vou Morrer Sozinho"	2018	—	—	—	—	PMB: Diamante	Lobos
"Me Beija com Raiva"	2018	—	—	—	—	PMB: 3× Platinum	Lobos
"Louquinho"	2019	—	—	—	—	PMB: Platinum	Non-album single
"Enquanto Me Beija"	2019	—	—	—	—	PMB: Platinum	Anti-Herói
"Essa Eu Fiz pro Nosso Amor"	2019	—	—	—	—	PMB: Platinum	Anti-Herói
"Me Liga" (with Ivete Sangalo)	2020	—	—	—	—		Ivete Sangalo – EP
"Coringa"	2021	83	—	7	—	PMB: 2× Platinum	Pirata
"Não Te Amo"	2021	—	—	—	—	PMB: Gold	Pirata
"Fugitivos :)" (with Luísa Sonza)	2021	—	—	—	—		Doce 22
"Idiota"	2022	85	23	2	17	PMB: Gold; AFP: Platinum	Pirata
"Sim" (with Nando Reis)	2022	97	—	—	—		Non-album single
"Pilantra" (with Anitta)	2023	99	23	2	23	AFP: Gold	Non-album single
"Me Lambe"	2023	99	48	2	—		Super
"—" denotes a single that did not chart or was not released in that territory.

=== As featured artist ===
List of singles as featured artist, showing year released, selected chart positions, certifications, and associated album
Title	Year	Peak chart positions		Certifications	Album
Title	Year	BRA Airplay	BRA Pop Airplay	Certifications	Album
"A Boba Fui Eu" (Ludmilla featuring Jão)	2019	54	2	PMB: Platinum	Hello Mundo
"Andar Sozinho" (Lagum featuring Jão)	2019	—	—	PMB: Platinum	Coisas da Geração
"—" denotes a single that did not chart or was not released in that territory.

=== Promotional singles ===
List of promotional singles, showing year released, certifications, and associated album
Title	Year	Certifications	Album
"Medo Bobo (Remix)" (Zebu featuring Jão)	2017		Sertanejo Remix
"Só Love" (Seakret and Buchecha featuring Jão)	2017		Non-album promotional single
"Codinome Beija-Flor / O Tempo Não Para"	2020		Non-album promotional single
"Amor Pirata" (Note: "Amor Pirata" was subsequently included in the physical version of Pirata.)	2021	PMB: Gold	Non-album promotional single
"Let's Rock the Break" (with KitKat)	2022		Non-album promotional single
"Break Épico" (with KitKat and Tasha & Tracie)	2023		Non-album promotional single
"Tenemos Que Hablar (Real Magic)" (with Danna Paola)	2023		Non-album promotional single
"Idiota (Real Magic)" (with Danna Paola)	2023		Non-album promotional single

== Other charted and certified songs ==
List of other charted songs, showing year released, selected chart positions, certifications, and associated album
Title	Year	Peak chart positions		Certifications	Album
Title	Year	BRA Airplay	BRA Pop Airplay	Certifications	Album
"Lindo Demais"	2018	—	—	PMB: Gold	Lobos
"Eu Quero Ser como Você"	2018	—	—	PMB: Gold	Lobos
"Ainda Te Amo"	2018	—	—	PMB: Platinum	Lobos
"A Rua"	2018	—	—	PMB: Gold	Lobos
"Monstros"	2018	—	—	PMB: Gold	Lobos
"A Última Noite"	2019	—	—	PMB: Platinum (2)	Anti-Herói
"Triste pra Sempre"	2019	—	—	PMB: Gold	Anti-Herói
"Você Vai Me Destruir"	2019	—	—	PMB: Platinum	Anti-Herói
"VSF"	2019	—	—	PMB: Platinum	Anti-Herói
"Santo"	2021	95	4		Pirata
"—" denotes a song that did not chart or was not released in that territory.

== Guest appearances ==
List of non-single guest appearances, showing other artist(s), year released and associated album
Title	Year	Other artist(s)	Album
"Amor Maior"	2018	Jota Quest	Collab
"Dilema"	2019	Malía	Escuta
"Dúvida"	2020	Vitor Kley	A Bolha

== Songwriting credits ==
List of songs written or co-written for other artists, showing year released and associated album
Title	Year	Artist	Album
"Dona da Minha Vida"	2018	Rouge	Les 5inq

== Music videos ==
=== As lead artist ===
List of music videos as lead artist, showing year released and directors
Title	Year	Director(s)	Ref.
"Álcool"	2017	Gabriel Dietrich	
"Ressaca"	2017	Gabriel Dietrich	
"Imaturo"	2018	Pedro Tófani	
"Vou Morrer Sozinho"	2018	Pedro Tófani	
"Me Beija com Raiva"	2018	Pedro Tófani	
"Louquinho"	2019	Pedro Tófani	
"Enquanto Me Beija"	2019	Pedro Tófani	
"Essa Eu Fiz pro Nosso Amor"	2019	Pedro Tófani	
"Me Liga" (with Ivete Sangalo)	2020	Chico Kertész	
"Coringa"	2021	Pedro Tófani and Malu Alves	
"Amor Pirata"	2021	Pedro Tófani and Malu Alves	
"Não Te Amo"	2021	Pedro Tófani	
"Fugitivos :)" (with Luísa Sonza)	2021	Luísa Sonza and Jacques Dequeker	
"Idiota"	2022	Pedro Tófani	
"Sim" (with Nando Reis)	2022	Carol Siqueira	
"Pilantra" (with Anitta)	2023	Pedro Tófani	
"Me Lambe"	2023	Pedro Tófani and Malu Alves	

=== Guest appearance ===
List of guest appearance, showing year released and directors
Title	Year	Director(s)	Ref.
"Dilema" (com Malía)	2019	Eduardo Levy and Marcelo Paiva	
"A Boba Fui Eu" (Ludmilla part. Jão)	2019	Julio Loureiro	
"Let's Rock the Break"	2022	—N/a	
"Break Épico" (com KitKat e Tasha & Tracie)	2023	—N/a	
"Tenemos Que Hablar (Real Magic)" (com Danna Paola)	2023	—N/a	
"Idiota (Real Magic)" (com Danna Paola)	2023	—N/a	
