= Rouge Remixes =

Remix album by Rouge
- Released: February 2003
- Recorded: 2002
- Genres: Electropop; dance
- Length: 48:37
- Labels: Sony Music; Columbia
- Producer: Rick Bonadio

Rouge chronology
O Sonho de Ser Uma Popstar (2002)	Rouge Remixes (2003)	C'est La Vie (2003)

Rouge Remixes is a remix album by Brazilian girl group Rouge, released in Brazil in February 2003. This double album features the band's debut album remixed by DJs Cuca and Memê with two bonus tracks, "Depois Que Tudo Mudou" (Cuca Club Remix) and Popstar megamix (Album Version), Não Dá pra Resistir/Beijo Molhado/Depois Que Tudo Mudou.

And the CD2 a video CD, which can be read by computer and DVDs and highlights three tracks of video, "Ragatanga", "Nunca Deixe De Sonhar" and "Não Dá Pra Resistir". The album sold about 150,000 copies and became a sensation in the dance clubs all over Brazil, with hits like Ragatanga (Cuca R&B Mix) and Cuca Club Remix.

== Track listing ==
No.	Title	Writer(s)	Length
1.	"Ragatanga (Memê's Da Carnival Beat Remix)" (Aserejé)	Francisco Manuel; Ruiz Gomez; version: Rick Bonadio	4:12
2.	"Beijo Molhado (Cuca Wet Club Mix)" (Strawberry Kisses)	Andy Marvel; Jeff Franzel; Marjorie Mayo; version: Guedes	4:55
3.	"Depois Que Tudo Mudou (Cuca Trance Radio Mix)"	Bonadio; Fernando Lopez Rossi; Pablo Durand	3:55
4.	"Hoje Eu Sei (Cuca House Mix)" (Just Another Day)	Franne Golde; Guy Roche; Janette Jurado; version: Rick Bonadio	4:13
5.	"Ragatanga (Cuca R&B Mix)" (Aserejé)	Francisco Manuel; Ruiz Gomez; version: Bonadio	4:48
6.	"Não Dá pra Resistir (Cuca Dance Mix)" (Irresistible)	Kara Dioguardi; Frederik Thomander; Anders Wikstrom; version: Milton Guedes	4:12
7.	"1000 Segredos (Cuca Magic Radio Remix)" (Come to Me)	Eliot Kennedy; Wendy Page; Jim Marr; Jorgen Eloffson; version: Márcio	3:32
8.	"Beijo Molhado (Cuca Elektro Remix)" (Strawberry Kisses)	Andy Marvel; Jeff Franzel; Marjorie Mayo; version: Guedes	3:32
9.	"Não dá pra resistir (Cuca Club Remix)" (Irresistible)	Kara Dioguardi; Frederik Thomander; Anders Wikstrom; version: Guedes	2:55
10.	"Ragatanga (Memê's Summer Heat Mix)" (Aserejé)	Francisco Manuel; Ruiz Gomez; version: Bonadio	3:54
11.	"Depois Que Tudo Mudou"	Bonadio; Fernando Lopez Rossi; Pablo Durand	3:25
Total length:			48:37

Bonus track
No.	Title	Writer(s)	Length
12.	"Depois que tudo mudou (Cuca Club Remix)"	Bonadio; Fernando Lopez Rossi; Pablo Durand	4:43
13.	"Pop Star Megamix"	Bonadio; Jaqueline Vargas	3:42

CD2
No.	Title	Length
1.	"Ragatanga" (Video)	3:22
2.	"Não Dá pra Resistir" (Video)	2:57
3.	"Nunca Deixe de Sonhar" (Video)	3:51
4.	"Ragatanga" (Karaoke)	3:22
5.	"Não Dá pra Resistir" (Karaoke)	2:57
6.	"Nunca Deixe de Sonhar" (Karaoke)	3:51
