= Dona da Minha Vida =

Single by Rouge

from the album Les 5inq
- Released: August 31, 2018
- Recorded: April 19–23, 2018
- Genre: R&B; trap
- Length: 3:03
- Label: Sony Music
- Songwriters: Aline Wirley; Li Martins; Lu Andrade; Jão; Karen Rodriguez; Joey Mattos; Lucas Nage; Marcelinho Ferraz; Mr. Paradise; Pedro Dash; Pedro Tofani
- Producer: Head Media

Rouge singles chronology
"Bailando" (2018)	"Dona da Minha Vida" (2018)	"Solo Tu" (2019)

Music video
- "Dona da Minha Vida" on YouTube

"Dona da Minha Vida" (transl. Owner of My Life) is a song by the Brazilian girl group Rouge. Sony Music released on August 31, 2018, as the lead singled the fifth studio album, Les 5inq (2019). The song was composed by the five members of the group in partnership with Pedro Dash, Marcelinho Ferraz, Karen Rodriguez, Mr. Paradise, Lucas Nage, Pedro Tofani, Joey Mattos and singer Jão, being focused on R&B with trap music and soul elements and inspired by the urban sonority of singers like Alicia Keys and Beyoncé. The theme of the song deals especially of the feminism, the feminine empowerment and the abusive relationships.

The music video was recorded on July 8, 2018, and released on the same day of the song, being directed by the duo Os Primos. Besides the themes proposed by the letter itself, the video also expresses the struggle of other aspects, such as transphobia, gophobia and violence against women, combating discrimination by uniting people of different ethnicities and sexual orientations, and presenting a kiss between a transsexual girl and a cisgender boy.

== Background ==
After returning to a concerts of the tour Chá Rouge - and later 15 Anos Tour -, the Rouge decided to launch a new song to commemorate the fifteen years of existence in homage to the fans. On February 5 is released "Bailando", track that followed the Latin pop previously used in "Brilha La Luna", combined with a fun and unpretentious composition, but also presented a new visual identity of the most sensual group. The track served as a bridge between the sound they made earlier and what they were willing to do at that moment, linking the public before with a modern outfit that would not be one of the contemporary artists.

In March 2018, surprised by the repercussion and acceptance of the public with "Bailando", the group decided to go into the studio to record a new material, but this time it would bring a maturation and a greater seriousness, since the previous track had been only commemorative, without great pretensions. For the new phase, they announced that they were selecting repertoire and open to meet new composers who wanted to work with them together. In addition, Umberto Tavares, songwriter of "Bailando", and the British Eliot Kennedy, songwriter of "Um Anjo Veio Me Falar", came in contact with the members to offer new songs. Soon after the group revealed that already had recorded several songs and was in process of choice for which would be used like first single of the future new album. Li Martins said she wanted a reggaeton recorded by them to be the initial choice, but that the group would use another track: "I really like a song that has a reggaeton, sensual, latin feel but it will not be the first single, because it's very close to "Bailando". There are other very strong, very good songs with incredible potential that will end up being released first."

== Recording and release ==
"Dona da Minha Vida"
23-second stretch of "Dona da Minha Vida".

On April 19, Lu Andrade announced that they were recording their new single, composed by the group itself in partnership with other names. A day later they released a video with audio off dancing the new song unpretentiously, leaving in suspense as the project would be. On April 23, the last day of recording the band, the group published a studio photo with singer Jão, one of the co-songwriter. During the recording, Li revealed that the intention was to show maturity with a work that had content: "We have a speech that really fits in our mouths, things that we really mean.Music with substance.Now we have more autonomy, much more active voice." On August 11 the members sing a chorus of the refrain during a concert in Recife.

On August 19, the group began releasing on Twitter an isolated letter in each publication that would form the name of the new song and announced that it would be released later that month. On August 21, the proposal was finally completed and the title "Dona da Minha Vida" was revealed along with the first photo of the music video, with the release date being announced at 0h of the passage from the 30th to the 31st of that month. On the 24th is released the cover of the single. To express that a new phase was beginning, the group blocked all the photos in its official Instagram, leaving only that of the announcement, using the strategy of "blackout" used by artists previously to illustrate the ritual of passage. Three days later a pre-release of the song is made available in Spotify and in Deezer, which adds that the music would have exclusive access to a preview. On the 30th, despite all planned strategy, "Dona da Minha Vida" ends up illegally leaking on the internet twelve hours before its official launch on digital platforms. Despite this, the group kept the schedule and released the track officially at the announced time.

== Composition and lyrics ==
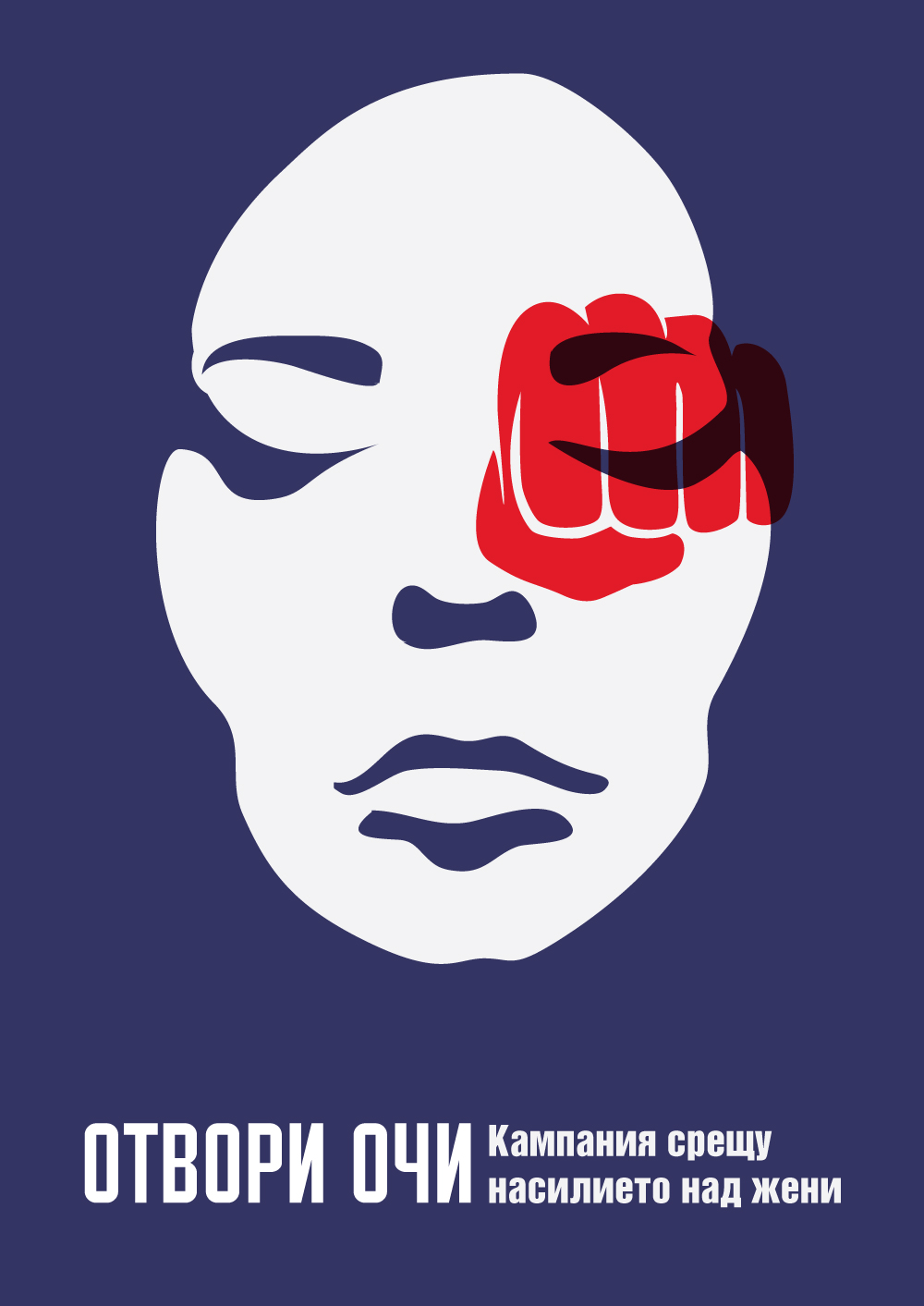
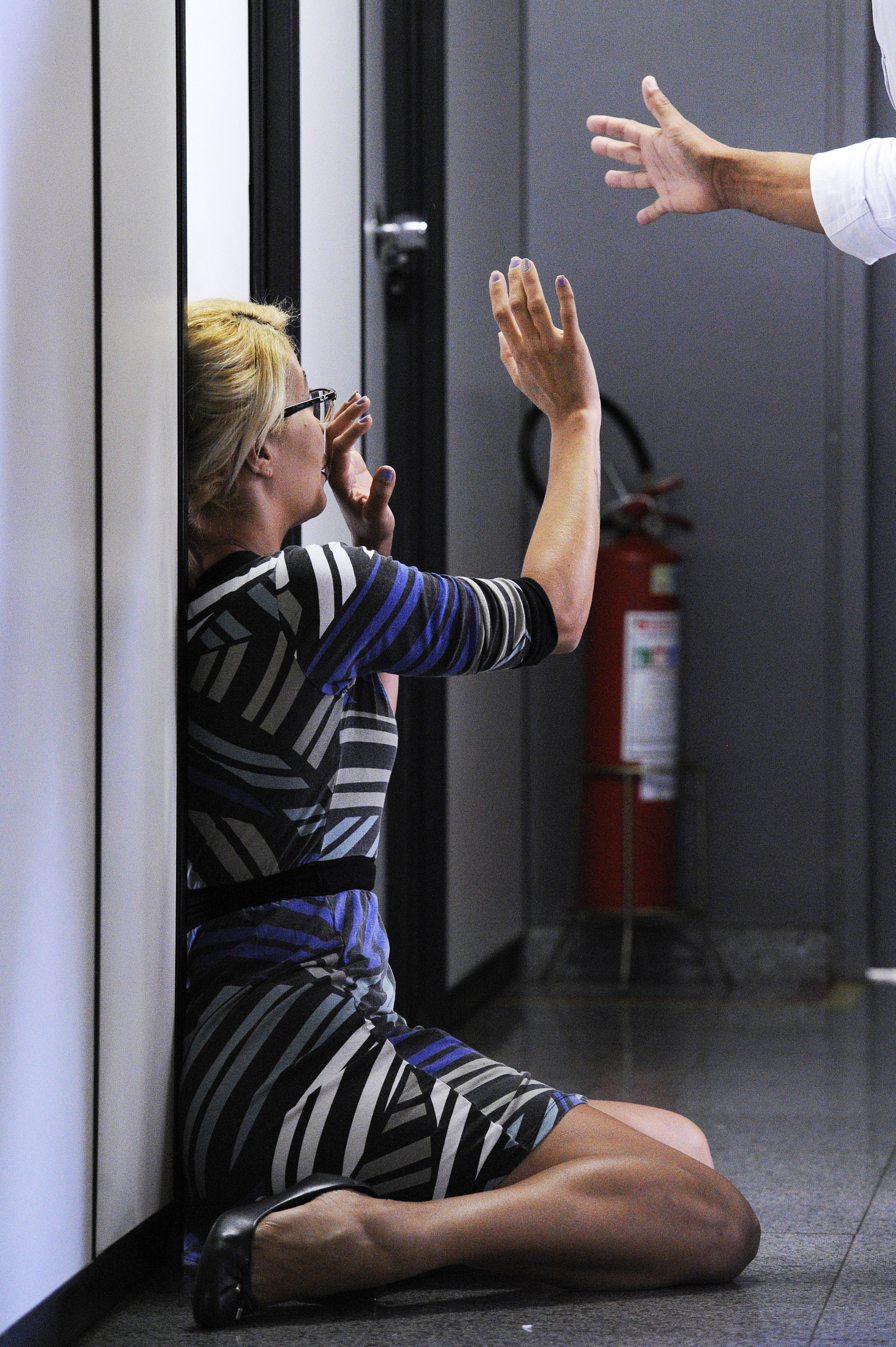
Female empowerment and abusive relationships were the themes used in the composition of "Dona da Minha Vida".

"Dona da Minha Vida" stands out from the group's previous songs for being focused on trap and R&B with a more urban and serious production, escaping from the traditional pop and dance-pop used by them until then. In addition, the track features elements of soul, bringing also instruments marked as piano, acoustic bass and three electric guitars, as well as synthesizers. The song was influenced by the musical style presented in the songs of Alicia Keys - like "No One", "Empire State of Mind" and "Girl on Fire" - besides some works of Beyoncé and Mariah Carey. The first drafts of the track, as well as its original idea, were conceived by the five members, bringing the later collaboration of Pedro Dash, Marcelinho Ferraz, Karen Rodriguez, Mr. Paradise, Lucas Nage, Pedro Tofani, Joey Mattos and Jão.

The composition of the band is divided into two themes, the first being feminism and female empowerment, when it enhances women's power not to let themselves be inferiorized by men ("I admit, so often I felt inferior to you / But how much the more you implore and cry, I remember my power") and puts you as the protagonist of the decisions of your own life ("All I had was your fake love / Bye bye, follow a path where I will not"). The second theme noted is the abusive relationship, when Li Martins sings about his partner's self-esteem ("I'm going to live all the dreams you've taken from me / All you said I'm not") and Lu Andrade interprets the hope of leaving of the situation ("I deserve to have what you took from me / I'll find the way out / Because I'm the owner of my life"). Head Media's collective of musicians was responsible for the production.

The composition is personally biographical for Li Martins, who revealed in 2015 that it suffered physical and psychological aggression of the ex-husband, Matheus Herriez. At the time, Matheus had hanged the couple's dog to cause psychological torture, and shortly thereafter, he went into physical violence in Li- "'Are not you going to hit me? and he said, 'I go and much'." - which came to an end after the neighbors called the police. According to Li, the decision to release a song that touched on more serious matters came after the group noted that it had responsibility in messages that passed to other people: "We think what we would like to say to our audience today. There is a difference because before we did not have so much notion of the responsibility that we carry."

== Critical reception ==
"Dona da Minha Vida" received mostly positive reviews from specialized critics. Guilherme Tintol, from the It Pop portal, stated that the band was representative and expressed not only the obvious lyrics, but also the artistic moment that the group lived at that moment, far from the impositions of Rick Bonadio, saying that the song has no "space for nostalgia "for being modern and superior to the "Bailando", taken as something to whom they could do, while "Dona da Minha Vida" was sharp, current and empowered. The magazine Caras stated that the song reflected a more mature position of the group when taking the front of the feminist movement and that it helped to endorse the struggles of those who suffer discrimination and violence. The Midiorama portal said that the track was a "destruction" - a slang used to say something is excellent - and positively different from all the material in the group, claiming that "the Rouge has renewed itself and is showing why it should never have stopped."

Marvin Medeiros, from Mais Pop column, stated that the song is full of "representativeness, egalitarianism and much empowerment" and that this was all that people needed, saying that the lyrics also "slap the face of the era that the group had an entrepreneur who made more money than the artists themselves. " The journalist finishes the criticism saying that it was good to see that the girls who danced "Ragatanga" now "grew, matured and own their own noses" and hoped that they could "get higher and higher flights". For Rodrigo Ortega and Braulio Lorentz of portal G1, the song follows the line of feminine empowerment of "Blá Blá Blá".

== Music video ==
The group on the two costumes used in the video.

=== Background and recording ===
The recording of the music video occurred on July 8 in the neighborhood of Bela Vista, São Paulo, taking advantage of the fact that it is the first hours of a Sunday morning to achieve an almost desert view of the city. Hair preparation and makeup began at 11 pm the night before with hair stylists and hair stylist Helder Marucci, Victor Nogueira and André Florindo and the recordings at 5:30, using the backdrop sunrise. In all there were sixteen hours between preparation and records. Pablo Falcão, manager of the group, idealized how the video would tell the story of the composition, also choosing for the team Rodolfo Magalhães for the art direction and Aisha Mbikila for the casting direction, which would be responsible for selecting people of all ethnicities, bodies and sexual orientations to compose the work.

During the video pre-production process, it was suggested that they opt for a professional with whom they had not worked before, but Lu suggested that they follow the duo of directors Os Primos - formed by João Monteiro and Fernando Moraes - with whom had already worked with "Bailando", since it considered that they had a cinematographic vision that fit in which they looked for, being defended by the others. The video was sponsored by the urban transport application Cabify, chosen strategically by the members for having an option where only female drivers look for users also women, guaranteeing the security and avoiding any possibility of harassment in vulnerable situations.

The preview of the music video was released on August 24. Already on the 27th, a video with alarming data on violence in Brazil was released, showing that 23 million women were harassed in 2017 and every 48 hours a transsexual was killed, questioning at the end "How long?". The video was scheduled to debut on the Vídeo Show at 2 pm on the 31st, but with the anticipated leak of the song the group decided to release the video at 0h along with the official song.

=== Synopsis and concept ===
"I wanted to tell you about my experience during the breastfeeding of Antonella. How society looked at me while breastfeeding in public. I could feel the stares, some embarrassed, some disgusted with this act."

— Li Martins talking about the breast to show in support of public breastfeeding.

The costumes of the video were designed by the stylist Gabriel Fernandes with the aid of the fashion producers Julia Moraes and Lucas Cancian Tempone, mixing pieces specially made for the group with others of ready-made designer. In the first part of the video the members appear singing and dancing in a heliport on the roof of a building, where Fantine uses only a leather jacket with glam rock cone rivets superimposed on a black collant; Li wears Balenciaga boots with a leather shorts and bare breasts, superimposed on a dress with entirely cast glitters; Lu uses a more traditional Versace black dress; Karin appears with a leather top overlaid with a transparency and a Gucci jacket, leather pants and Louboutin shoes; already Aline used two belts united to simulate a top, superimposed to a blazer Balmain.

Already the second visual used was made specially for the video, inspired by the Twelve Olympians of Ancient Greece. Only Li's costumes were not original, being a repagination of the one used by her in the Chá Rouge tour, chosen personally by her after testing several other clothes and not arriving at the message that she wanted to pass: of maternity. According to the singer, the decision to use an outside breast concealed only by an "X" consisting of two tapes was a criticism of the sexist society, which does not judge naked women in jobs aimed at the male audience, but judges mothers who breastfeed publicly. The choice of white fabrics was to express peace and equality.

From the middle of the video some stories were being incorporated. The transsexual model Kiara Felipe appears painting her fingernails for fear of leaving home due to the homophobia situation in Brazil and later is seen kissing a cisgender actor, showing the diversity of relationships. There are scenes of women being aggressively held by their partners and one of them crying, and before the second refrain there is still the image of a red light flashing over a woman's eyes symbolizing a physical aggression on her face. There is still the representation of the movement by the acceptance of the body itself with a plus size girl enjoying herself in front of the mirror. All these people join the members in an equality march, in which there are people of all ethnic groups and sexual orientations.

== Commercial performance ==
On the first day of the release, "Dona da Minha Vida" achieved impressive numbers, reaching number one on the two main digital music sales platforms - iTunes and Apple Music - and at the top of the video "Em alta" on YouTube, which counts the viral. In just over a day the video clip had also reached 1 million views, maintaining an effect similar to "Bailando".

== Promotion ==
On September 5, the group began the release of "Dona da Minha Vida" at SBT's The Noite com Danilo Gentili, where they told about the creation process and they played the video exclusively for the first time on television. The presence of the group made the program lead in the audience, besides putting the hashtag #RougeNoTheNoite in first place in Brazil and third in the world. On September 6, the first performance of the live band on TV in Gazeta TV's show Todos Seu, presented by Ronnie Von, where the group also sang "Bailando" and announced the release of the fifth studio album in a few months. On September 9 the second performance is performed in Band's Agora É Domingo, along with several other songs from the repertoire. On September 15, the group presents itself in the SBT's Programa Raul Gil - the last program that was before the end of activities in 2005 - where not only will they sing the new track, but also three other bands and will receive a tribute from the children of the group A Turma do Vovô Raul. On September 16 the track was performed at show Record TV's Hora do Faro.

== Release history ==
Country	Date	Format	Label
Brazil	August 31, 2018	Digital download	Sony Music
