= Li Martins =

Brazilian musician and actress

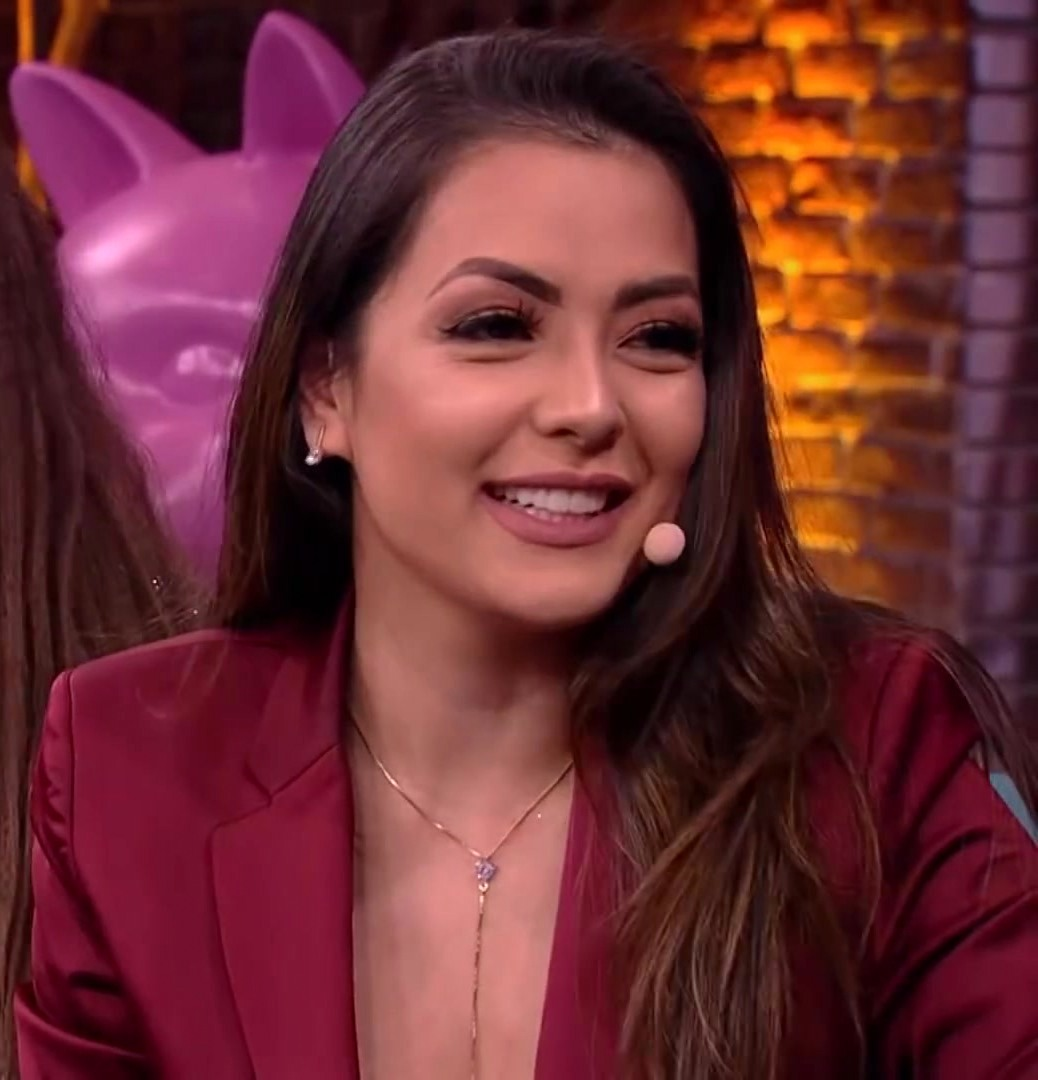
- Martins in 2018
- Born: Patricia Lissa Kashiwaba Martins; 29 March 1984 (age 42); Sertanópolis, Paraná, Brazil
- Occupations: Singer; actress
- Spouse: Matheus Herriez (m. 2009; div. 2014)
- Children: 1
- Musical career
- Genres: Pop; dance-pop
- Instrument: Vocals
- Years active: 2002–present
- Labels: Columbia; Sony BMG

Patricia Lissa Kashiwaba Martins (born 29 March 1984) is a Brazilian singer, songwriter, and actress. In 2002, she won the talent show Popstars and joined the Brazilian girl group Rouge until 2005, with which she released four studio albums, Rouge (2002), C'est La Vie (2003), Blá Blá Blá (2004) and Mil e Uma Noites (2005), selling in all 6 million copies and becoming best-seller Brazilian girl group.

In 2007, she became a stage actress, focusing on musical theatre. She debuted as a protagonist in Miss Saigon playing Kim, an Asian woman abandoned by her American lover. In 2009 she starred in the Broadway version of the Beauty and the Beast, based on the Walt Disney animated film. In 2010, she starred in Strange Case of Dr Jekyll and Mr Hyde and in 2011 she starred in her first comedy, The Phantom of the Mask, inspired by the classic Phantom of the Opera.

In 2012 she played the role of Filipina Cynthia in the Brazilian production of Priscilla - Queen of the Desert, based on the film of the same title. In 2014, she toured Brazil with Disney in Concert, a mix of musical and entertainment shows featuring the performance of the famous songs of classic Walt Disney animated films. In 2015 she became part of the eighth season of the reality show The Farm. In 2016, she released her first single Vai Chegar, which is part of the opening theme of Sila's telenovela Rede Bandeirantes.

== Early life ==
Patricia Lissah Kashiwaba Martins was born to a doctor and educator in Sertanópolis, Paraná. However, she lived all her childhood and adolescence in Rolândia. At the age of four, she began attending Japanese language classes and sang in music contests in the Japanese community. Martins was encouraged by her maternal grandmother, who was Japanese, and since she lived inside the community she used the Japanese part of her name, "Lissah Kashiwaba". Lissah was also part of her school's choir, which performed at celebration parties in the city. Initially, singing was a hobby because she wanted to be a doctor like her father, but at the age of fourteen she began to sing professionally. She became a popular event singer, performing at weddings, graduations, fairs, and other celebrations in her city and region.

== Career ==
=== 2002–06: Rouge ===
In 2002, Li Martins enrolled in the talent show Popstars and was selected from around 30,000 people, and passed to the second phase of the audition. More than 6 thousand people classified in the Anhembi Sambadrome, Sao Paulo, where they performed auditions. After 5 qualifying rounds, only 8 girls were selected as finalists which took place at the home of the Popstars. After the 6th and final eliminating phase, the Brazilian girl group was finally formed by Fantine Thó, Li Martins, Luciana Andrade, Aline Wirley, and Karin Hils. In the same year, they won a contract for their first studio album, Rouge, to be released. It was an instant hit, reaching the number 1 place on several music charts and selling around 2 million copies. They were awarded the diamond certificate by the Brazilian Association of Record Producers (ABPD). The lead single was Não Dá para Resistir, followed by Ragatanga, a track which featured the Spanish girl group Las Ketchup. Other tracks include Beijo Molhado and Nunca Deixe de Sonhar. The group released a remix album titled Rouge Remixes, which sold 150 thousand copies, receiving a gold certificate, and the video album O Sonho de Ser Uma Popstar.

In 2003 the group released their second studio album, C'est La Vie, selling around 100,000 copies in the first week of release and around 1 million copies in total. The album included singles like Brilha La Luna, Um Anjo Veio Me Falar and Vem Cair na Zueira. On December 3, 2003, the second recording of concerts of the group is released on DVD, titled A Festa dos Seus Sonhos. On February 11, 2004, Luciana announced that she was leaving the group, claiming a lack of identification with the group's sound. After the departure of Luciana, the four remaining members continued recording and released the albums Blá Blá Blá (2004) and Mil e Uma Noites (2005). The group split permanently in June 2006, when their contract with Sony Music expired and was not renewed. Over the course of four years, the group sold about 6 million records, becoming the most successful female group in Brazil and receiving two gold certificates, two platinum certificates, one double platinum certificate, and one diamond certificate by ABPD.

=== 2006–present: Career as an actress ===
In 2007, Li was invited to record the Portuguese version of Gotta Go My Own Way, from the soundtrack of High School Musical 2, originally performed by Vanessa Hudgens. The track, entitled Vou Ser do Jeito que Eu Sou, was released as a single that year, marking the new phase of her career. In 2008 she returned to her first stage name, Lissah Martins, in honor of her maternal grandfather Takuichi Kashiwaba, and made her musical debut as Miss Saigon in a production by Cameron Mackintosh of Boublil & Schönberg, which was staged for the first time in London and two years later debuted on Broadway. The musical went to 25 countries, translated into 12 different languages and watched by more than 30 million viewers. Miss Saigon won many awards around the world, including the Tony Awards, the premier award for American theater. In 2009, once again starring in a blockbuster Broadway hit, Lissah played the character Belle, Beauty and the Beast. Based on Walt Disney's two-Oscars design and the first animation to run for the main prize (Best Picture), Broadway's stage set has surpassed 13,000 performances worldwide, seen by 16 million viewers in more than 13 countries, including Canada, Japan, Mexico, and Argentina.

In 2010, Lissah also appeared in Jekyll & Hyde - The Doctor and the Monster. Another Broadway musical, based on the classic work of Robert Louis Stevenson. With a version of Cláudio Botelho and direction of Fred Hanson, the show has already been assembled in 17 countries, with more than 1,500 exhibitions at the Plymouth Theater in New York, which was on display at Teatro Bradesco in São Paulo. In 2011, Lissah performed with the children's musical The Phantom of the Mask at the Raul Cortez Theater in São Paulo and the Clara Nunes Theater in Rio de Janeiro. The show is a free adaptation that the mining author Victor Louis Stutz made of the classic Phantom of the Opera, by Gaston Louis Alfred Leroux. The direction is of Rosi Campos, well known for having interpreted the Morga Witch of the Rá-Tim-Bum Castle. In 2012, she took part in another great challenge in musical theater, the role of Filipina Cynthia, married to the mechanic Bob, character of Saulo Vasconcelos, in the Brazilian production of Priscilla - Queen of the Desert, which began the season on March 17 in the Theater Bradesco in São Paulo. Since her debut in musicals, Lissah has always played the young lady of the history and now she has to live the opposite. The play tells the story of three drag queens traveling from Sydney to a tourist town in the remote Australian desert to perform. In 2014, Li participated in the reality show This Artist I am. In the same year she travels to Brazil with the Disney in Concert, which mixes musical and show, interpreting the famous songs of classic films of Walt Disney. In 2015, she joined the list of participants of the eighth season of reality show The Farm. In 2016 was released its first single Vai Chegar, which is part of the opening theme of the telenovela Sila of Rede Bandeirantes.

== Personal life ==
In April 2007, Martins began a relationship with the singer Matheus Herriez, once a member of the group Br'oz. They married on May 20, 2009 at the Our Lady of Brazil Church in São Paulo. The couple divorced in 2014 but this was not made public until October 2015, when Lissah disclosed it during her participation in The Farm. In December 2015 she began to date model João Paulo Mantovani (JP) and in February 2017 the couple announced they were expecting their first child. On June 14, 2017, by which time the couple had separated, she gave birth to a girl, Antonella.

== Influences ==
Her musical influences are Celine Dion, Mariah Carey, Toni Braxton and Britney Spears.

== Discography ==
=== Singles ===
Title	Year	Album
"Vou Ser do Jeito Que eu Sou" (feat. Zac Efron)	2007	High School Musical 2
"Vai Chegar"	2016	Non-album single

==== As featured artist ====
Title	Year	Album
"Promise (Til The End Of Time)" (E.Motion feat. Lissah Martins and Tonanni)	2011	Non-album single

=== Other appearances ===
Title	Year	Other artist (s)	Album
"Abra os Olhos"	2007	—N/a	Bratz: O Filme
"Bratitude"	2007	Aline Wirley	Bratz: O Filme
"Mentiras, Poesias e Flores"	2009	Matheus Herriez	Ser o que Sou
"Vejo Enfim a Luz Brilhar"	2013	Izaias Xavier	Enrolados
"Lying"	2014	Shameless	Game On
"Run Away"	2014	Tommy Love	Tommy Love
"Um Dia de Domingo"	2014	Daniel	Daniel 30 Anos: O Musical

=== Music videos ===
Title	Year	Director
"Vou Ser do Jeito Que eu Sou"	2007	Kenny Ortega
"Vai Chegar"	2016	Daniel Behrendt

== Theatre appearances ==
Year	Production	Role
2007–08	Miss Saigon	Kim
2009	Beauty and the Beast	Belle
2010	The Strange Case of Dr. Jekyll and Mr. Hyde	Emma
2011–12	The Phantom of the Opera	Belinha
2012–13	Priscilla, Queen of the Desert	Cyntia
2014	Disney in Concert	Belle / Mulan / Ariel / Elsa
2015	Histórias do Brasil	Beatriz

== Filmography ==
Year	TV show	Role	Notes
2002	Popstars	Contestant (Won)	Season 1
2002	Rouge: A História	Presenter	
2003	Romeu e Julieta	Friend of Julieta	Year end special
2013	Fábrica de Estrelas	Herself	Episode: "The Return of the Rouge"
2014	Esse Artista Sou Eu	Contestant	Season 1
2015	The Farm	Contestant	Season 8
2016	Band Folia	Apresentadora	
2016	Dance Se Puder	Sworn	Season 2

=== Films ===
Year	Film	Character
2003	Xuxa Abracadabra	Herself
2005	Eliana em O Segredo dos Golfinhos	Herself
