= Les 5inq =

Studio album by Rouge
- Released: February 1, 2019
- Recorded: March 2018–January 2019
- Genre: Pop; R&B; reggaeton
- Length: 28:00
- Language: Portuguese; Spanish
- Label: Sony Music
- Producer: Head Media (also exec.)

Rouge chronology
Mil e Uma Noites (2005)	Les 5inq (2019)	Rouge Sessions - De Portas Abertas (2019)

Singles from Les 5inq
- 1. "Dona da Minha Vida" Released: August 31, 2018; 2. "Solo Tu" Released: January 18, 2019

Les 5inq (transl. The Five) is the fifth studio album by the Brazilian girl group Rouge, released on February 1, 2019 by Sony Music. It serves as the group's comeback album, their first in fourteen years, following the release of 2005's Mil e Uma Noites. The album was the first commercial album release to feature the group's original lineup since Luciana Andrade left in 2004. Rouge collaborated with production team Head Media.

== Background and recording ==
After returning to a concerts of the tour Chá Rouge - and later 15 Anos Tour -, the Rouge decided to launch a new song to commemorate the fifteen years of existence in homage to the fans. On February 5 is released "Bailando", track that followed the Latin pop previously used in "Brilha La Luna", combined with a fun and unpretentious composition, but also presented a new visual identity of the most sensual group. The track served as a bridge between the sound they made earlier and what they were willing to do at that moment, linking the public before with a modern outfit that would not be one of the contemporary artists.

In March 2018, surprised by the repercussion and acceptance of the public with "Bailando", the group decided to go into the studio to record a new material, but this time it would bring a maturation and a greater seriousness, since the previous track had been only commemorative, without great pretensions. For the new phase, they announced that they were selecting repertoire and open to meet new composers who wanted to work with them together. In addition, Umberto Tavares, songwriter of "Bailando", and the British Eliot Kennedy, songwriter of "Um Anjo Veio Me Falar", came in contact with the members to offer new songs. Soon after the group revealed that it had already recorded several songs and was in the process of choosing which would be used as the first single of the new project. On June 10, Li Martins revealed that the group had recorded reggaeton "Solo Tu": "It has a reggaeton, sensual, Latin footprint. It is very close to "Bailando." On September 6, the group announced the release of an extended play (EP) before the entire album exclusively in Todo Seu, Gazeta TV, opting for the program to tell the information because Ronnie Von was the only one to open space for the members to divulge their solo works during the period that the group had closed the activities. On October 2, the group announced the title of the EP in social networks as 5, in reference to the fact that it is their fifth unpublished work, in addition to containing five tracks, revealing that the launch would be in the day 8 of that month.

== Music and lyrics ==
Les 5inq's songs are predominantly pop, R&B and reggaeton, fusing elements of trap, Latin pop with funk carioca, differing from the other albums of the group for not betting on traditional, dance-pop and bubblegum pop, with teenage lyrics. "Solo Tu" was originally written by Dutch singer Emy Perez, whose Fantine Thó became friends during the fourth season of The Voice of Holland (2013), and shown to her during a trip to Amsterdam in December 2017 in case she was interested in recording with the group. In Brazil, a team of composers were responsible for translating the Dutch parts of the track into Portuguese, mixing with phrases in Spanish and English, focusing on Latin pop and reggaeton for production. In spite of the ready band, Thó revealed that she believed she was still missing something, coming up with the idea of introducing a rap in Spanish during the last stanza while taking a shower, claiming that she had run out of the house to record it on her mobile phone so as not to forget. "Beijo na Boca" brought a more sensual theme, blending the funk carioca with R&B and trap, according to the portal Popline, escape the obvious of the tracks of the funk genre to sound more sophisticated, without explicit appeal and without phrases with words beaten like "to roll" and "butt". The rapper Vitão, who composed the initial sketch of the track, recorded the demo to introduce to the girls, but ended up being invited to join them as a special guest in the final version after they noticed that a rapper would fit the proposal well.

"Dona da Minha Vida" brought a political composition about female empowerment and abusive relationships, betting on a more serious and sober production than the rest of the album by mixing trap and soul with the more urban R&B, inspired by the urban sound of singers like Alicia Keys and Beyoncé. The song "Sem Temer", different from the group's traditional ballad's like "Um Anjo Veio Me Falar" and "Sem Você", has an atmosphere that remembers the band of pagode Sampa Crew, according to the members, and was also described by Lu Andrade as the album's most popular song and one of their most mature tracks. Lyrically, the song addresses a more adult view of love. The last track of the EP, "Te Ligo Depois", focused on the dancing R&B and the five members' choirs, with high notes and traditional girl groups, referring to the group's more relaxed sound in the first phase and inspiring the sound of Beyonce's "Crazy in Love".

== Critical reception ==
Professional ratings
Review scores
Source	Rating
Jornal do Commercio	Mixed
Portal Comenta	3/5 stars

Les 5inq's received mixed reviews from music critics. Robson Gomes of Jornal do Commercio received the album favorably with some caveats, highlighting the songs "Solo Tu", calling it "solar"; "Beijo na Boca", highlighting the vocals of Li Martins; "Não é Não" and "Dona da Minha Vida", because of their empowered lyrics; "Te Ligo Depois" on account of vocal harmony; and "Como Se Fosse a Primeira Vez", evidencing the interpretation of Fantine Thó. On the other hand, the critic pointed out that "Good Vibes" is not a strong point of the album, that "Juntinho" does not measure up to the artist Aline Wirley is, and that "Sou Mais Eu" has lyrics that do not favor the song very much. Robson also pointed out that "the short Les 5inq, of only 28 minutes and 10 tracks, as well as the abrupt hiatus announced, leaves the feeling of 'want more' in the air." On the other hand, Jurandir Dalcin of Portal Comenta evaluated the album with 3 of 5 stars, highlighting "Dona da Minha Vida" and "Como Se Fosse a Primeira Vez" as the best of the album, and noting that "Les 5inq is a medium album and this is the fault of previous works that were very the fact that each one has a solo track was a differential, but could have a two or three tracks the more in group, since this one has great chances to be the last album of the five."

== Singles ==
"Dona da Minha Vida" was the lead single released on the album on August 31, 2018, differing from the previous work of the group for being focused on R&B with elements of trap and soul. The music video of the track, besides the themes proposed by the letter itself, also expresses the struggle of other aspects, such as transphobia, gophobia and violence against women, combating discrimination by uniting people of different ethnicities and sexual orientations, besides presenting a heterosexual kiss between a transgender girl and a cisgender boy.

"Solo Tu" was chosen by the fans as the second single from the Les 5inq, through a vote in Spotify, being released on January 18, 2019.

== Track listing ==
No.	Title	Writer(s)	Producer(s)	Length
1.	"Solo Tu"	Emy Perez; Fantine Thó; Rino Sambo; Dan Valbusa; Youri de Bruijn; Marcelinho Ferraz; Joey Mattos	Head Media	3:06
2.	"Good Vibes" (introducing Li Martins)	Bárbara Dias; Dmax; Ferraz; Pedro Dash	Head Media	2:08
3.	"Beijo na Boca" (featuring Vitão)	Feid; Mattos; Vitão; Valbusa; Ferraz; Dash		2:38
4.	"Não é Não" (introducing Karin Hils)	Daniel Ferreira; Valbusa; Junior Garça; Ferraz; Dash; Tiê Castro	Head Media	2:30
5.	"Sem Temer"	Aline Wirley; Thó; Karin Hils; Li Martins; Lu Andrade; Rolo; Jowan; Mattos; Dmax; Vitão; Ferraz; Dash; Douglas Moda	Head Media	3:43
6.	"Juntinho" (introducing Aline Wirley)	Dias; Carol Biazin; Dmax; Luccas Carlos; Ferraz; Dash; Vitão	Head Media	3:04
7.	"Sou Mais Eu" (introducing Lu Andrade)	Ferraz; Mayra; Dash; Seysey	Head Media	3:04
8.	"Te Ligo Depois"	Vitão; Dash; Valbusa; Ferraz	Head Media	3:16
9.	"Como Se Fosse a Primeira Vez" (introducing Fantine Thó)	Bibi; Dias; Valbusa; Dmax; Ferraz	Head Media	3:12
10.	"Dona da Minha Vida"	Wirley; Thó; Hils; Martins; Andrade; Jão; Karen Rodriguez; Mattos; Lucas Nage; Ferraz; Mr. Paradise; Dash; Pedro Tofani	Head Media	3:42
Total length:				28:00

== Release history ==
Country	Date	Format	Label	Ref
Brazil	February 1, 2019	Digital download	Sony Music	
