= Girls (Brazilian band) =

Brazilian girl group

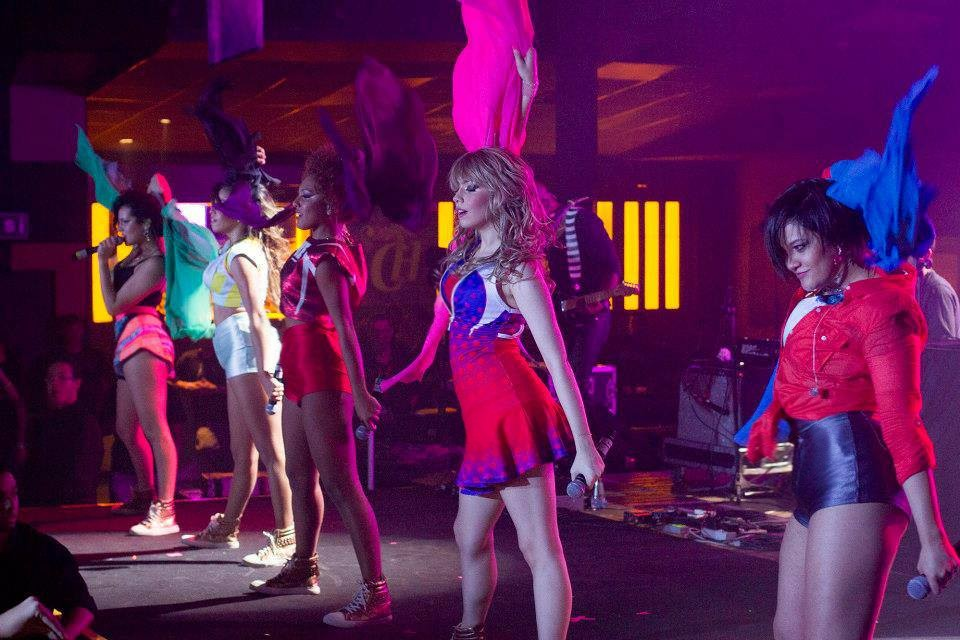
- Girls performing in 2013

Background information
- Also known as: Banda Girls
- Origin: São Paulo, Brazil
- Genres: Pop, dance-pop, teen-pop
- Years active: 2013–2014
- Labels: Sony
- Past members: Ani Monjardim; Bruna Rocha; Caroline Ferreira; Jennifer Nascimento; Natascha Piva

Girls were a Brazilian girl group of pop music formed in 2013 through the program Fábrica de Estrelas, transmitted by the network-TV Multishow. The group is composed of Ani Monjardim, Bruna Rocha, Caroline Ferreira, Jennifer Nascimento and Natascha Piva. The group's first album, the homônio Girls, was released on September 3 by Sony Music, bringing the participation of Negra Li, Mika Borges, Aggro Santos and Suave, besides compositions of integral NX Zero, Gee Rocha and Di Ferrero. The first single, "Acenda a Luz", was released on August 8, and the disc also removed two promotional singles, "Monkey See Monkey Do" and "Shake Shake".

On January 30, 2014, producer Rick Bonadio announced the end of the group amid controversy due to Sony Music claims not to have more interest in the work of girls, thereby precluding the continuity of the group.

== Formation ==
On March 3, 2012 the producer Rick Bonadio revealed in an interview for the Folha de S.Paulo that had closed a partnership with Sony Music and producer Forest to launch a reality show along the lines of Popstars. The aim would be to form a girl group pop music with five girls with distinct personalities, inspired by the success of the Rouge and Spice Girls, where they sing and dance. On October 31 registrations are open on the site of the Multishow for the program, Fábrica de Estrelas, for girls 15–25 years old, sending in a video singing a song of choice until Nov. 30. In all, 4000 which entered during the first phase, only 120 were chosen chicks through the videos. In the second phase, the selected were divided into four groups and went through a dance audition with music "Run the World (Girls)" by Beyoncé, plus a vocal test. This selection were only 25 girls in the program. After being divided into five groups consistent with their personalities - Princess, Moleca, Warrior, Sexy and Surprise - the girls went through a stage where they should learn and record a new song "Monkey See Monkey Do", of which only 20 remained.

During the fourth stage the girls went through a workshop body expression, which sang songs befitting the theme requested by the preparer, and dance classes, with only 15 girls followed. During the fifth stage the selected entered the studio to record the track "Monkey See Monkey Do" in a professional manner, and a sound track chosen by themselves, and these, only 10 remained. Na sexta etapa as semi-finalistas passaram pelos testes de vídeo e fotografia, de onde as duas participantes deixaram o programa. The 8 finalists of the program a few months at home to perform requested improvements, and in return the girls went into the studio to record an unprecedented "Acenda a Luz", and perform for the President of the Sony Music. At the end of the program, the finalists performed at the stage of a theater in many different combinations of five girls to jurors singing tracks "Monkey See Monkey Do" and the new "Shake Shake". In order to integrate the chosen group were Ani Monjardim, Bruna Rocha, Caroline Ferreira, Jennifer Nascimento and Natascha Piva.

Presentations Fábrica de Estrelas
| Stage | Song | | | | |
| Stage | Ani Monjardim | Bruna Rocha | Caroline Ferreira | Jennifer Nascimento | Natascha Piva |
|---|---|---|---|---|---|
| 1st stage (Video) | "Hurt"/"Die in Your Arms"/"Fuckin' Perfect" | "Give Your Heart a Break" | "João de Barro" | "Listen" | "It Will Rain" |
| 2nd stage | "Fuckin' Perfect" | "Lilás" | "João de Barro"/"Fala Mal de Mim" | "I Have Nothing"/"Ela É Top" | "If I Ain't Got You" |
| 3rd stage | "Monkey See Monkey Do" | | | | |
| 4th stage | "Chalana" | "Estrada do Sol" | "Como Nossos Pais" | "Hero" | |
| 5th stage | "Monkey See Monkey Do" | | | | |
| 5th stage | "Meu Erro" | "Os Outros" | "Boa Sorte/Good Luck" | "Um Anjo Veio Me Falar" | "Eu Não Vou" |
| 6th stage | No hearing | | | | |
| Final | "Acenda a Luz" | | | | |
| Final | "Monkey See Monkey Do"/"Shake Shake" | | | | |

== Career ==
=== 2013-2014: First album and early end ===
Shortly before the end, a poll is created in the channel's website Multishow to select the group name from among five options suggested by members: Girls, Gloss, F5, Glow and Blend. On July 2, 2013 is announced that the winning title was Girls, with 28% of the votes. The name was suggested by the girls to be part of the title song "Run the World (Girls)" by Beyoncé, the first song they danced in the program. On August 5, the group released their first single, "Acenda a Luz" in iTunes, being on the radio that the launch took place during an interview for the program Pânico, of Jovem Pan. On the same day the group releases for digital download the promo single "Monkey See Monkey Do". On August 6, the girls participate in the program Agora É Tarde giving the first interview of his career, which also revealed the album cover and sing "Monkey See Monkey Do". On day 19 is released the second promotional single, "Shake Shake". The next day 20, the clip of the title track "Monkey See Monkey Do" is released in VEVO official group, bringing the direction of Alex Miranda and participation rapper Aggro Santos, still having the sponsorship of brands Seda cosméticos and Chiclete Poosh!. On August 31, the girls performed their first show for the general public during a presentation in Z Festival, where he sang his own repertoire, plus the cover of "We Found Love" by Rihanna on a stage designed specially for the group. The next day the group sings at the festival No Capricho, event held by magazine Capricho. On September 3 was released the first album of the group, homônio Girls by Sony Music. The album features the participation of Negra Li on the track "Guerreiras", Mika Borges in "O Mundo Dá Voltas" and rapper Suave in "Molha Sua Boca". The production is on account of Rick Bonadio, also bringing compositions of integral NX Zero, Gee Rocha and Di Ferrero.

On January 20, 2014 the news that the group would end up began circulating in the media, rocked by the fact that the group had taken a vacation some time and could not give statements, after being disowned by entrepreneurs. But on January 30 Beth Mariani de Souza, mother Ani, who revealed his personal Facebook page that business owners had driven the members of the apartment where they lived group, funded by Sony Music, with only the clothes on without let-them bring other personal items. Soon after Ani Monjardim vented into your personal page on the event: "If I knew all this would turn my life into a living hell at home, rather than another were in my place." On the same day Bruna Rocha stated that the group was being dismissed and would have to undo: "Unfortunately there will be more investment in the band, which makes the five they live in Sao Paulo and continue the project." Finally, hours later, producer Rick Bonadio and label Sony Music decided to rule and announced that there was more interest in investing in the group due to lack of return and who were officiating their separation. In the media the biggest reason for the end of the group was the lack of disclosure by the label. "Played the product without the public knowing what it was. Lacked actions, investments, take these girls to pocket shows at parties and clubs with a concentration of opinion., After all, does not hold for a band with only reference to a reality cable TV show," stated in the communication portal Popline.

== Members ==
| Name | Date |
|---|---|
| Rafaela Mariane "Ani" Monjardim | 4 April 1994 (age 31) |
| Bruna Rocha Afonso | 27 December 1993 (age 32) |
| Caroline de Almeida Ferreira | 9 July 1994 (age 31) |
| Jeniffer Nascimento | 29 July 1993 (age 32) |
| Natascha Piva | 27 June 1990 (age 35) |

== Discography ==
- 2013: Girls
