= Vem Habib (Wala Wala) =

Single by Rouge

from the album Mil e Uma Noites
- Released: May 23, 2005
- Recorded: 2005
- Genre: Middle eastern; Arabic pop
- Length: 3:35
- Label: Columbia; Sony BMG
- Songwriter: Rick Bonadio
- Producer: Rick Bonadio

Rouge singles chronology
"Pá Pá Lá Lá" (2004)	"Vem Habib (Wala Wala)" (2005)	"O Amor é Ilusão" (2005)

"Vem Habib (Wala Wala)" is a song by the Brazilian pop girl group Rouge, for the group's fourth studio album, Mil e Uma Noites (2005). It was written by and produced by Rick Bonadio. It takes inspiration from "arabic pop music", having a totally different rhythm from the previous songs of the group. Columbia Records released "Vem Habib (Wala Wala)" as the first single from the album on May 23, 2005. The music video of the single is spent in the desert, where they are prisoners of a sultan. The group also sang the song on the Mil e Uma Noites Tour (2005), Chá Rouge Tour (2017) and 15 Anos Tour (2018).

== Background and composition ==
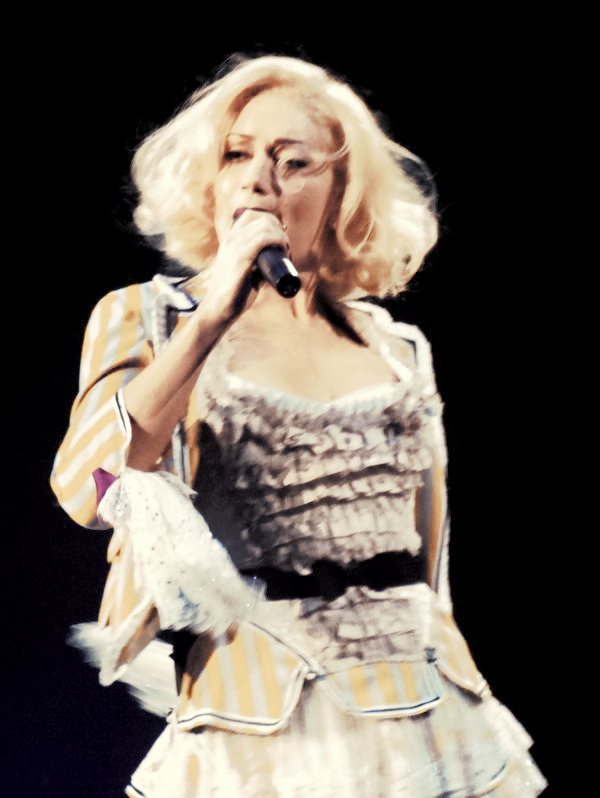
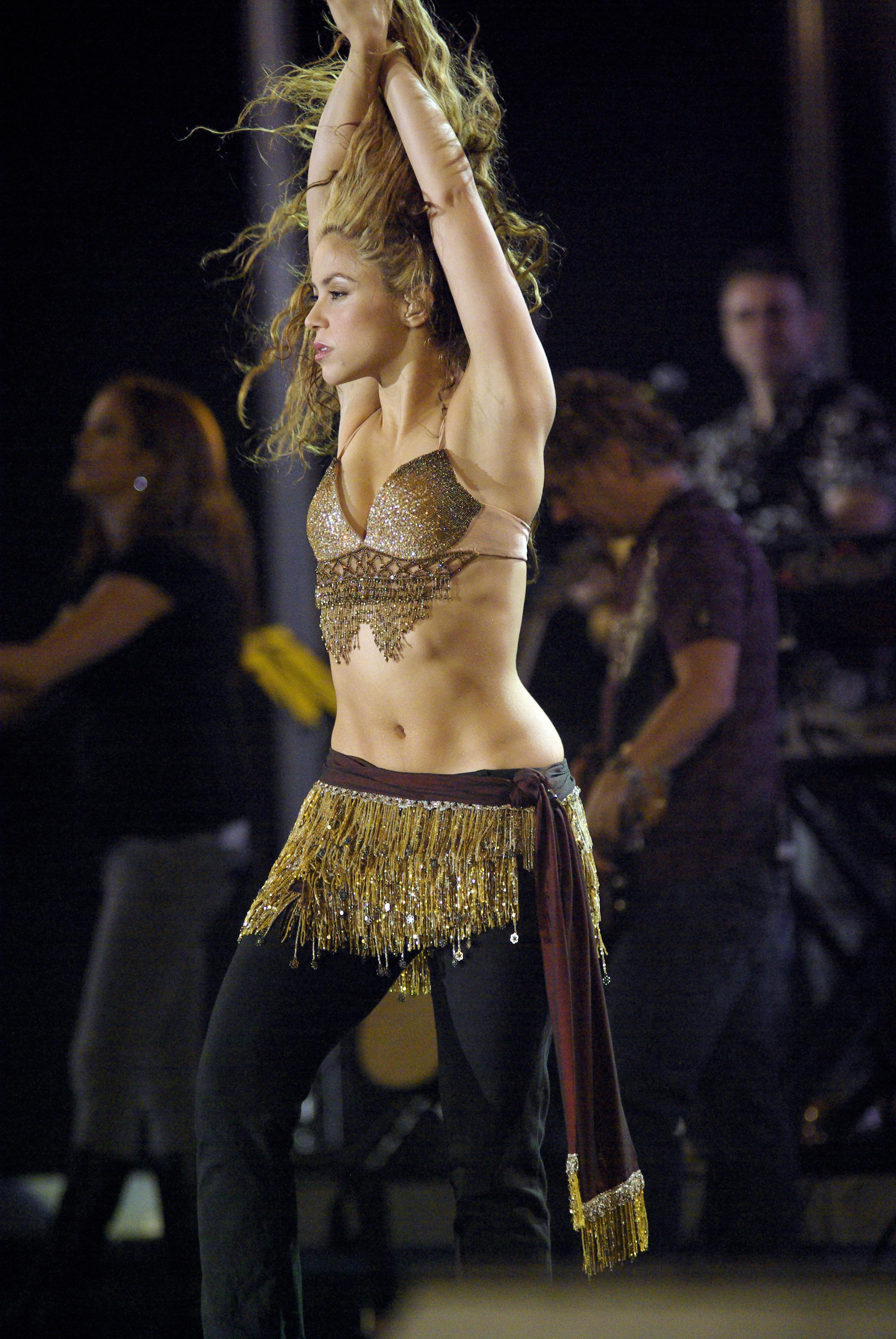
According to Patricia, the song is inspired by Rich Girl of "Gwen Stefani" (left) and Whenever, Wherever, Shakira (right).

'Vem Habib, Wala Wala', our new single, is a super fun song. In fact, it was the most fun we've ever done in the studio, everyone clapping their hands together, shouting HABIB! WALA!, Even Rick and Paulinho got in the wheel! It was awesome."

"Vem Habib (Wala Wala)" was written and produced by Rick Bonadio. Columbia Records released the song as the first single from the fourth studio album, Mil e Uma Noites (2005), on May 23, 2005. It explores "arabic pop music", which was a surprise to the public, who were accustomed to the group's style in previous songs. The music brings all the wealth of the Arab universe, and the girls had to take classes of belly dance to be more immersed in culture.

According to Patricia, references to the song were "Rich Girl", released by No Doubt vocalist Gwen Stefani, on her solo album Love. Angel. Music. Baby. (2004) And "Whenever, Wherever" hit Shakira.

== Lyrics ==
The song begins with the girls singing, "Wala wala wala wa, wala wala wala wa, na na na na, na na na, na na na na." Karin sings the first part of the entire song, talking about how she sought love for a thousand and one nights. The second part brings Karin singing again, referring to various Arab characters, "An enchanted prince, a sheik, a sheik and a sultan, Ali Baba as a thief came to steal my heart," sings Karin. Just on the bridge, Fantine sings, "Wala, wala is a desert dance. In the wala wala we dance very closely ..." Before the cry given by Karin, Aline sings, "I want you so much, I can prove you, a thousand and one nights of love I'll give you."

== Critical reception ==
To Bruno Nogueira from Folhapé, "the variation of 'A Thousand and One Nights', is very pleasant, except probably for the work song, which invests too much into the musical style of the Middle East appropriated by Rede Globo in the soap opera O Clone." Marcos Paulo Bin from Musical Universe found that the song "maintains the group's proposal - dancing melody, relaxed lyrics and children's appeal", comparing the song to "Ralando o Tchan (Belly Dancing)" by É o Tchan's Arab themes.

== Music video ==
The music video was recorded in the desert on June 3, was directed by Karina Ades and debuted on June 16 on MTV Brasil. The video takes the girls on a trip to the desert, through a fable full of magic and sensuality, valued by the richness and color of oriental fabrics and objects. In the clip, the girls also are prisoners of a sultan.

== Disclosure ==
The group also made a special participation in the novel Floribella, of the band, singing the single "Vem Habib" and the success "Um Anjo Veio Me Falar". "Vem Habib" was also part of the setlist for the Mil e Uma Noites tour (2005).

== Charts ==
Chart (2005)	Peak position
Brazil (Brasil Hot 100 Airplay)	4
