= Br'oZ =

Brazilian pop music boy band

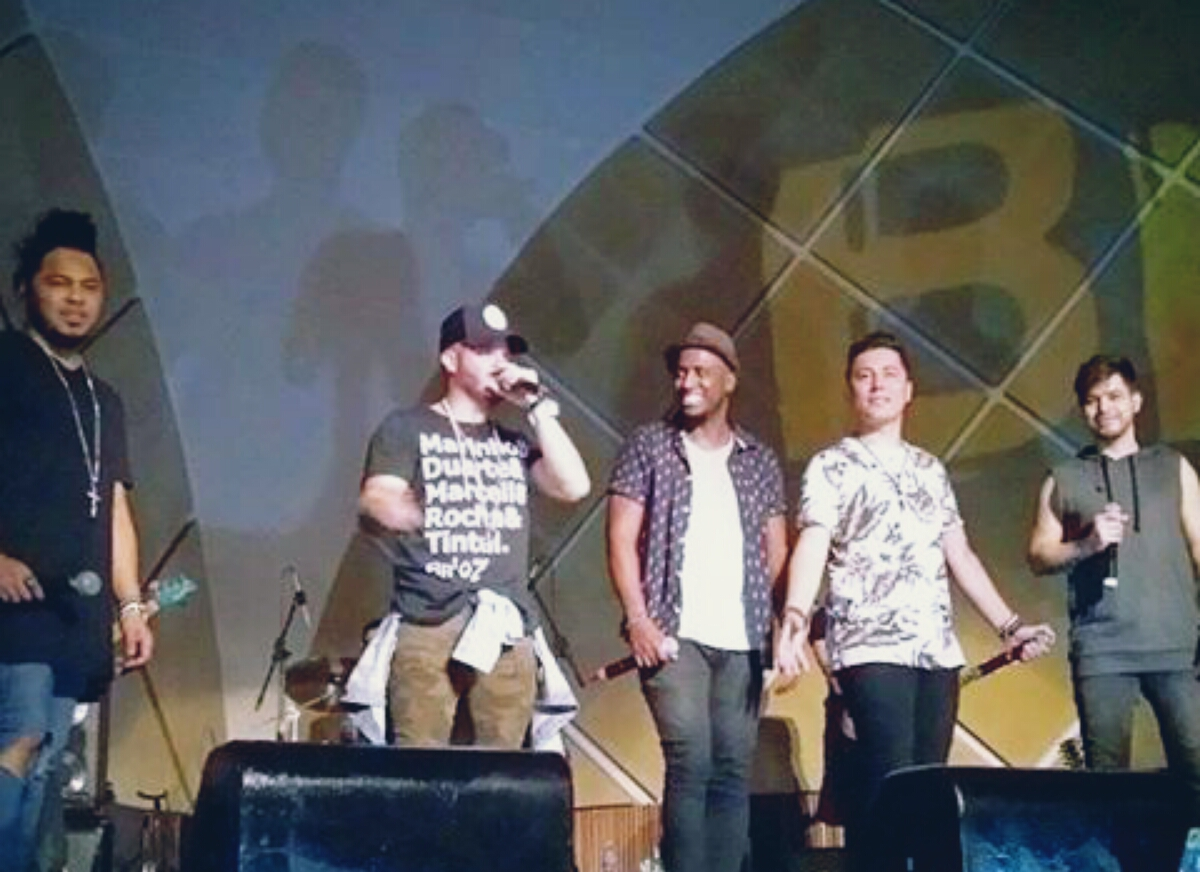
- Br'oz in 2017.

Background information
- Origin: São Paulo, Brazil
- Genres: Pop
- Years active: 2003–2005, 2016-present
- Label: Columbia Records
- Members: André Marinho; Jhean Menezes; Matheus Rocha; Oscar Tintel
- Past members: Filipe Duarte

Br'oZ is a Brazilian boy band formed in the second season of the reality show Popstars, broadcast by SBT in 2003. They released two albums during their career as a band, and spawned two huge hits in Brazil, "Prometida" (2003) and "Vem Pra Minha Vida" (2004).

== Biography ==
The television show Popstars, famous for previously forming the Brazilian girl band Rouge, was directed to male public in its second season (2003). Five out of 36,000 young adult men were selected, through several tests, to form the boy band Br'oZ. Then, in 2003, they released their debut album, simply called Br'oZ, which was a huge hit: it went Gold in its first week of release, and would later receive a Platinum certification, in honour of selling over 250,000 copies in Brazil. The lead single, "Prometida", was one of the biggest hits of the 2003. In 2004, Br'oZ recorded and released their second album, Segundo Ato (Second Act). Although it spawned a huge hit, "Vem Pra Minha Vida", it was by far less successful than their first album, not going even Gold. The group formally broke up in 2005. One of the vocalists, Filipe, became the lead singer of the pagode group Os Travessos. Another member, André, joined the band Cupim na Mesa and currently is working in his solo career. Matheus Herriez acted in some musicals and is performing with his rock band Monk; he is married with the ex-Rouge integrant Lissah Martins since 2009. Jhean is now working with planning and digital strategy but still sings, as vocalist, in the band Capital Jones. Oscar Tintel was the vocalist of the pagode group Disfarce, but now he is working in solo career.

After 11 years of the group's disbandment, Br'oZ returns in 2016 with a new single, named "Foi Melhor Assim", and starts to tour around Brazil. As of July 2019, there is no announcement regarding a second reunion.

== Discography ==
Studio Albums

Title	Details
Br'oz	Released: 2003; Label: Sony; Format: CD
Segundo Ato	Released: 2004; Label: Sony; Format: CD

Video Albums

Title	Details
Br'oz - Os Novos Popstars	Released: 2003; Label: Sony; Format: DVD

== Singles ==
List of singles, with selected chart positions and certifications, showing year released and album name
Title	Year	Album
"Prometida"	2003	Br'oz
"Tudo o que Você Quiser"	2003	Br'oz
"Se Você Não Está Aqui"	2004	Br'oz
"Vem Pra Minha Vida"	2004	Segundo Ato
"Toma Conta de Mim"	2004	Segundo Ato
"Foi Melhor Assim"	2016	Non-album single
