= Bailando (Rouge song) =

Single by Rouge
- Released: February 4, 2018
- Recorded: November 13, 2017
- Genre: Pop; dancehall
- Length: 2:48
- Label: Sony Music
- Songwriters: Umberto Tavares; Jeferson Junior; Fantine Thó
- Producer: Umberto Tavares

Rouge singles chronology
"O Amor é Ilusão" (2005)	"Bailando" (2018)	"Dona da Minha Vida" (2018)

Music video
- "Bailando" on YouTube

Bailando (transl. Dancing) is a song by the Brazilian girl group Rouge, released as the group's first return single on February 4, 2018, and is distributed by Sony Music. The song was recorded on the night of the 13th at dawn on November 14, 2017, and was composed and produced by Umberto Tavares and Jefferson Junior, with additions in the composition of the member Fantine Thó. "Bailando" is the first single from Rouge since 2005 (the last being "O Amor é Ilusão") and the first with its original line up since 2003 (when "Vem Cair na Zueira" was released, being the last single counting with member Luciana Andrade).

"Bailando" is a song that derives from the styles pop and dancehall, counting on strong elements of Latin pop. Musical Criticism defined the song as a new dance hit and emphasized the song's chorus. To promote the song, the group performed for the first time on Globo TV on the "Ding Dong" panel of the Domingão do Faustão TV show on February 4, 2018. The music video, directed by the pair of directors Os Primos, was released right after the song is played, counting more than 1 million views in less than 24 hours. In the music video, the group appears using three different costumes, besides the members appear amid the effects of LED lights interspersing with a choreography done by the choreographer of the group. The group performed the song for the first time on the show in Florianópolis, on February 9, which is part of the 15 Anos Tour.

== Background ==
After the release of the third and final single from the group's second studio album, C'est La Vie (2003), the song "Vem Cair na Zueira" in November 2003, rumors that member Luciana Andrade would leave the group started to appear in the media. On February 11, 2004, the news was confirmed and Luciana left the group. The group also released two albums between 2004 and 2005 with the remaining four members, and by the end of 2005 several media reported that the group would split the following year. In December 2005, the group officially announced its end. In 2012 rumors surfaced that the group would meet again, after a social networking move calling for the return of the Rouge, with the band's former music producer Rick Bonadio, who would use the premiere of his show, Fábrica de Estrelas, in the Multishow, to bring them together. In 2013, the group met briefly - without Luciana again - to record two new songs. Due to bureaucratic issues, the singers did not go on tour - as promised - and the meeting ended only with the participation in the reality musical and two songs that ended up not being worked and released commercially. In 2016, the four members met for a return attempt, but the meeting was only held in mid-2017, when actor and manager Pablo Falcão, organizer of the "Tea of Alice" party, contact with the five members to carry out a commemorative edition of the party.

After the invitation accepted, on September 12, 2017, it was announced that the group was back with the five members to hold the commemorative shows. Then, after the success of the concerts held together with the "Tea of Alice", the group announced exclusively to the magazine Contigo!, who would definitely be back, announcing a tour for the year 2018, in addition to the release of a new DVD. In parallel to this, Pablo Falcão officially became the group's manager, announcing also recording new songs. On November 10, 2017, the Rouge team confirmed to PopLine that the group would release a new single as early as 2017 and that the title of the song would be "Bailando." Weeks later, in an interview with Jornal do Commercio, Pablo confirmed that the song would be released in January 2018, and that the music video for the song would be recorded in December. On November 13, 2017, the group entered the studio to record the song. On December 1, 2018, in an interview with PopLine, the singers revealed that composer and music producer Umberto Tavares had written "Bailando." Although promising the song for January, Pablo said that the song would be released before the carnival of 2018, without giving further details, although he promised that the song would be released in national network.

On January 29, 2018, the cover of the single was released, showing each of the five members wearing a windbreaker of each fluorescent color, with the title scratched above their heads, as well as square fluorescent scratches around them. The photo was made by Rodolfo Magalhães and the cover art by Hugo Pontes. On the same day, a "pre-save" was initiated in the service of streaming Spotify, besides the group to have summoned the main vehicles of the press for a meeting in São Paulo to show the track and to grant interviews to promote the new work. On February 4, 2018, the song was leaked on the internet, in bad quality. On the same day, Pablo published a music video teaser on his Instagram page with the caption: "Leaked, right? Wait!". On February 4, 2018, "Bailando" was released, becoming the debut song with the original line-up since 2003.

== Composition and lyrics ==
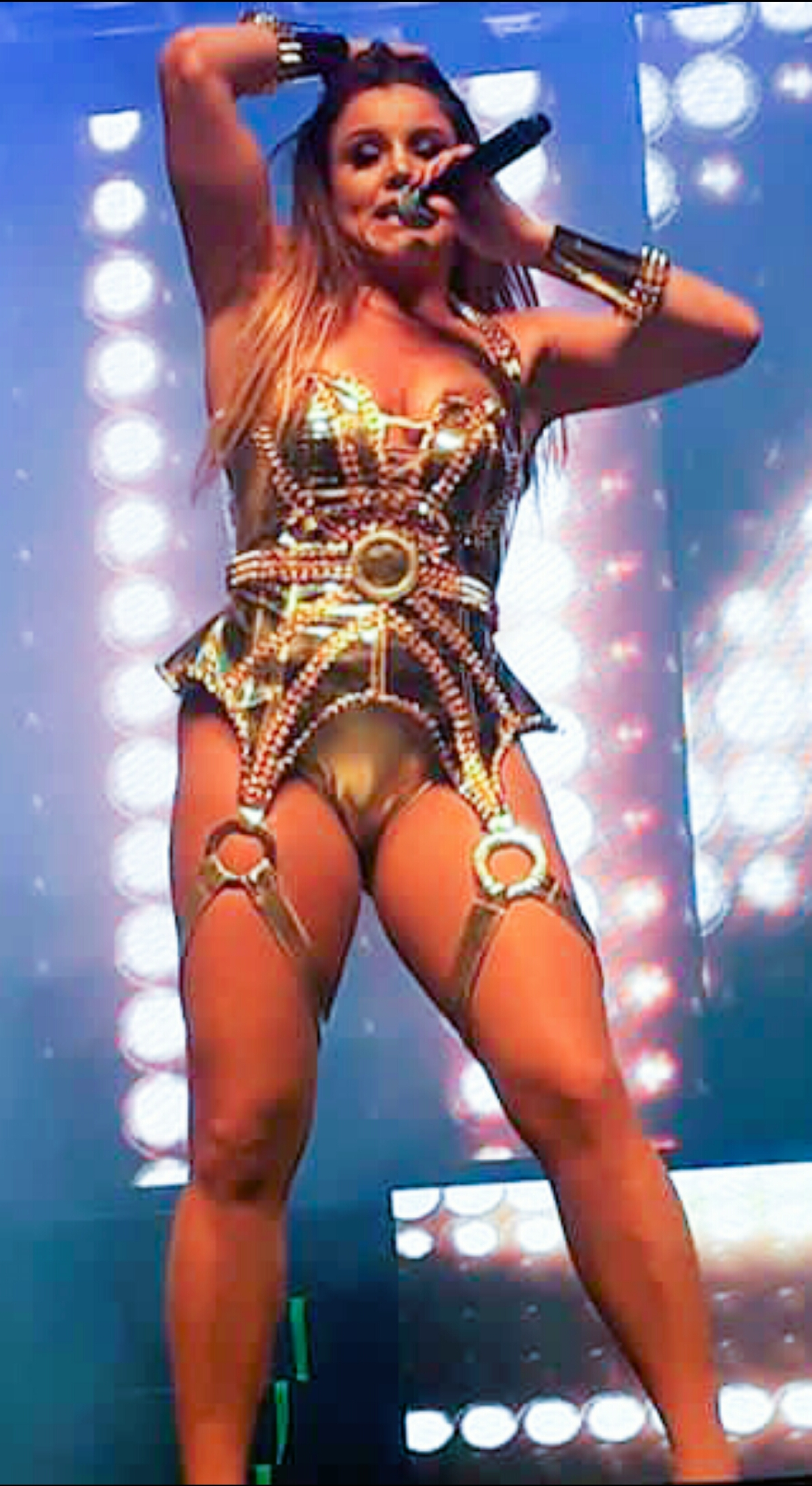
Upon receiving the song, the member Fantine added new verses, as well as melodies previously not in the song.

"Bailando" was composed by Umberto Tavares, Jefferson Junior and Fantine Thó, and was produced by Tavares. The song was given to the girls by Tavares, and when they arrived at the studio, they decided to tinker with the intention of adding more substance, with unpublished verses written by Fantine. According to her, "we add" the energy of sound has power, comes that everything can happen, being happy is allowed, comes here that the world is colored. "Composition is a continuous attempt and a continuous process of maturing to be able to say and find the words that translate what is really in our heart ... our dream of unity, acceptance, peace, understanding can not stop."

"Bailando" is a pop and dancehall song with strong elements of Latin pop, which had already been confirmed by the member Li Martins, who added: "We always work a lot with Latin because it was kind of an identity of ours. that, with a new job, it could not be different.We needed to print this in this new work". Producer Umberto Tavares, in an interview with Billboard Brasil, explained:" I wanted to bring their identity. I wish I did not stay away from what people keep from them in remembrance". [...] "I knew their discography and this relationship with the Spanish was marked in my mind".

== Critical reception ==
The editors of the newspaper Correio said that the song "has a Latin footprint and a remarkable refrain, as well as the band's biggest success in the "Ragatanga" in the 2000s". Already the writing of the IBahia called the song of "a new dance hit and with a Latin hint." Leonan Oliveira of the Show Livre defined "Bailando" as a song "lively and [that] mixes expressions in Spanish with Portuguese - a characteristic that has always been with the girlband." The Southern radio FM website has emphasized the fact that the song has a "chewing gum refrain."

== Release ==
The music was officially launched worldwide for online retailers and broadcasting services by digital download and stemming on February 4, 2018.

== Promotion ==
=== Music video ===
Recorded at dawn on January 13, 2018, in the city of São Paulo, the music video of the song was directed by the pair The Primos, and has choreography by Rômulo Morada. The video was released on February 4, 2018, on the group's official channel on Vevo and YouTube, where, on the first night of the release, the video reached more than 120,000 views and topped the charts in addition to have reached more than 1 million views in less than 24 hours. The video brings the group using three different costumes and "shows choreographed members and playing with the effects of production LED lights."

=== Live performance ===
On February 1, 2018, dancer Camila Hindi posted a photo with Rômulo Morada, the group's choreographer, on the same day as the recording of the "Ding Dong" painting of the Domingão do Faustão TV show in her Instagram stories. In the picture, the presenter gathers personalities in a musical fortune-telling contest, where the artist responsible for the song 'secret' presents itself. "Ragatanga" was the song chosen to be guessed. After talking to Fausto Silva and singing "Um Anjo Veio Me Falar" at the chapel, the group made the first performance of "Bailando", in addition to performing at Globo TV, for the first time. The Hashtag #RougeNoFaustão tag ranked first in trend topics in Brazil with more than 34,100 tweets on Twitter, and the audience of the show has increased its audience by 20% over the previous four weeks. The previous day, during the dawn of February 3, 2018, during the 15 Anos Tour in Belo Horizonte, Minas Gerais, the member of the group Karin Hils sang an excerpt from the song, amid fans' requests. On February 7, 2018, the group announced that "Bailando" would be part of the soundtrack of the film Peter Rabbit, a film where the group will perform a dubbing of the film, as well as singing three Portuguese versions of songs of the soundtrack. The song was included in the Rouge 15 Anos tour for the first time on February 9, 2018, at the show in Florianópolis, entitled to a bis with the red body used in the music video.

== Track listing ==
Digital download
No.	Title	Writer(s)	Length
1.	"Bailando"	Umberto Tavares; Jefferson Júnior; Fantine Thó	2:48
2.	"Bailando (Peter Rabbit (film version))"	Umberto Tavares; Jefferson Júnior; Fantine Thó	2:48

== Credits and personnel ==
- Vocals – Aline Wirley, Fantine Thó, Karin Hils, Li Martins, Lu Andrade
- Songwriting – Umberto Tavares, Jeferson Junior, Fantine Thó
- Production – Umberto Tavares

Credits adapted from Tidal.

== Release history ==
Region	Date	Label	Format	Ref.
Brazil	February 4, 2018	Sony Music	Digital download	
