= O Sonho de Ser Uma Popstar =

Video by Rouge
- Released: August 31, 2002
- Recorded: September 23, 2002
- Venue: Via Funchal; São Paulo, SP
- Genre: Pop
- Length: 87:00
- Label: Columbia; Sony
- Producer: Rick Bonadio

Rouge chronology
Rouge (2002)	O Sonho de Ser Uma Popstar (2002)	Rouge Remixes (2002)

O Sonho de Ser Uma Popstar (transl. The Dream of Being a Popstar) is a 2002 video album by Brazilian girl group Rouge. The DVD was recorded at on Via Funchal in São Paulo, on August 31, 2002, presented the group's first show.

== Track listing ==
No.	Title	Length
1.	"Popstars"
2.	"Não Dá Pra Resistir"
3.	"Sou O Que Sou"
4.	"Quero Estar Com Você"
5.	"Olha Só"
6.	"Ragatanga"
7.	"Depois Que Tudo Mudou"
8.	"Beijo Molhado"
9.	"O Que O Amor Me Faz"
10.	"Te Deixo Tocar"
Total length:		87:00

== Awards ==
Year	Awards ceremony	Award	Results
2002	Multishow Brazilian Music Award	Best DVD	Nominated
