= Não Dá pra Resistir =

Single by Rouge

from the album Rouge
- Released: August 19, 2002
- Recorded: 2002
- Genre: Pop; dance-pop
- Length: 2:57
- Label: Columbia; Sony
- Songwriters: Kara DioGuardi; Frederik Thomander; Anders Wikstrom; Milton Guedes
- Producer: Rick Bonadio (Portuguese version only)

Rouge singles chronology
"Não Dá pra Resistir" (2002)	"Ragatanga" (2002)

Music video
- "Não Dá pra Resistir" on YouTube

"Não Dá pra Resistir" (lit.: "I Can't Resist") is a song by the Brazilian girl group Rouge, released on August 19, 2002 as the debut single from the band's debut studio album, self-titled Rouge (2002). Originally a song in English, titled "Irresistible", written by Kara DioGuardi, Frederik Thomander and Anders Wikstrom, it was adapted into Portuguese by Milton Guedes and produced by Rick Bonadio. The original version of the song was later sung by Nikki Cleary and released on her self-titled album, a year after the adapted song released in Brazil.

"Não Dá pra Resistir" is a medium tempo pop song about an irresistible love in which the protagonist initially does not want to admit her attraction, but then confesses that she is very much in love. The song was released in August, even before the reality show ended, and became a hit on the radio. Just like the videoclip, the song achieved great success on television. It was the opening theme of SBT's Pequena Travessa soap opera.

== Background and release ==
After the start of the Popstars TV show, which aimed to form a group of five girls, those involved started looking for songs for them to record. When they reached the number of twenty candidates, the girls had to learn the group's work song, which would be "Can not Resist". With this, they also had to divide into groups to make a presentation of the song. After this process, the winning girls recorded the song.

Between August 12 and 17, Aline Wirley, Fantine Thó, Karin Hils, Luciana Andrade and Patrícia Lissa were chosen as the definitive members of Rouge, thus earning "Não Dá pra Resistir" radio play as the album's first single.

A Spanish version, titled "Y Cómo Resistir", was made for the Spanish version of the album C'est La Vie, but the album was not released due to Luciana's departure. Even so, the song was released on the internet. The song was the opening theme of the soap opera Pequena Travessa, from 2002, SBT, starring Bianca Rinaldi and Rodrigo Veronese.

== Composition and lyrics ==
Não Dá pra Resistir" is a Portuguese version of the song "Irresistible", composed by Kara DioGuardi, Frederik Thomander and Anders Wikstrom. In its English version, the song is a teen pop, whereas in the Portuguese version, written by Milton Guedes and produced by Rick Bonadio, the song became a more pop and dance-pop with elements of R&B and hip-hop. The song talks about a love that is irresistible, where the protagonist tries to disguise, but ends up falling in love with the loved one.

The song begins with Luciana on lead vocals, followed by Patricia, who changes versions with Luciana to the chorus. In the chorus, the girls sing, "I can not resist your love, you look at me like this, baby, I go, your kisses just for me, and your taste, I can not resist I need your love." After the chorus, Karin sings the second full part, taking help from the girls in the backing vocals. After the second chorus, Aline sings an excerpt from the bridge, followed by Fantine. In the final chorus, the girls sing together, until the last sentence, "can not resist," is sung by Luciana.

== Chart performance ==
"Não Dá para Resistir" became a hit in Brazil, becoming the group's first hit on radio. In addition, the song was a success in Argentina, obtaining the position of number 10 in the country's chart.

== Music video ==
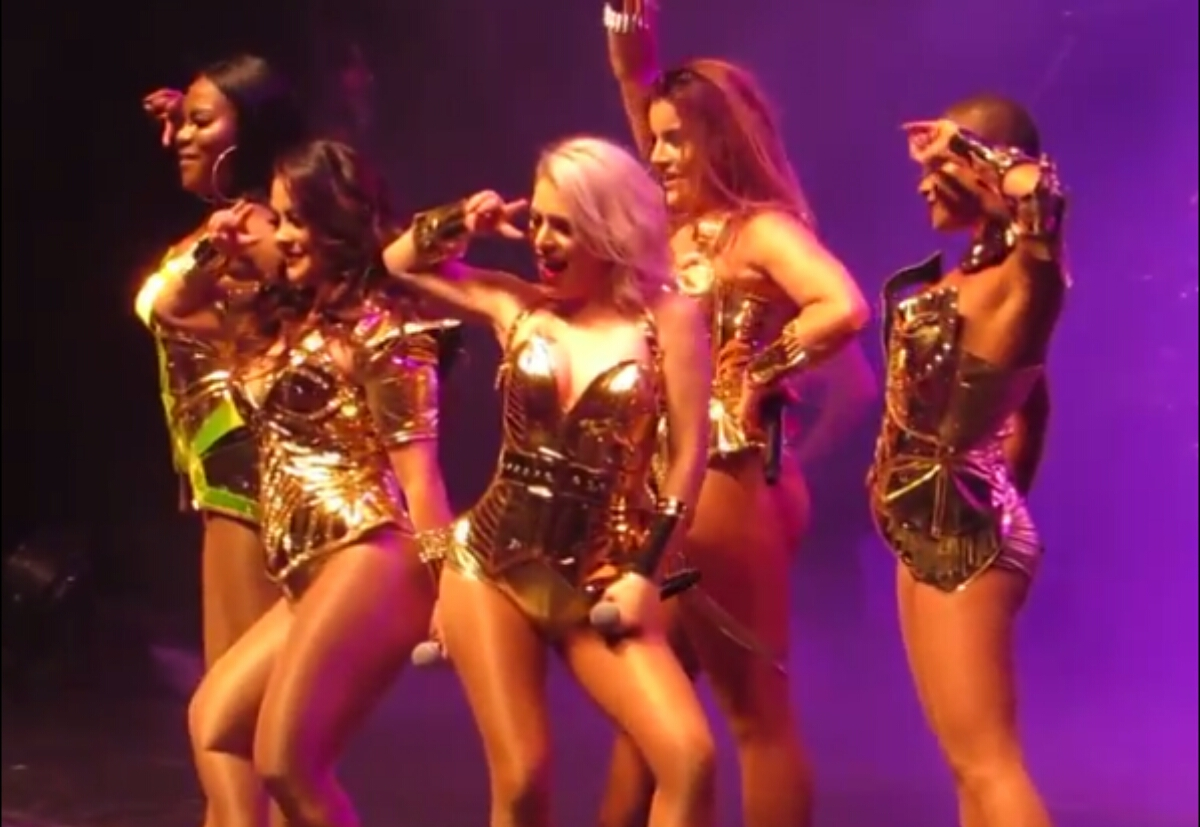
The group performing "Não Dá pra Resistir", during Rouge 15 Anos tour.

After being announced as Popstars winners, the girls recorded the music video, which premiered on August 19, 2002, during the group's press conference. The display of the first video of the group caused hugs and shouts between the girls.

=== Synopsis ===
The music video starts with a zoom of each of the members and their respective names. After that, Luciana sings her part, sitting on a ladder, and at the same time two scenes are shown: one of Luciana standing in a scene full of mirrors, and another of the group performing the choreography of the song (a scene that is always interspersed with others scenes from the video). Then Patrícia comes near Luciana, singing her part looking at her. This scene is interspersed with a scene of Patricia in the scenery of mirrors and with the dance scene.

After the chorus, the group does a dance choreography, where the song is interrupted by the dance break. After the choreography, Karin sings her part in the scenery of mirrors, and also in the scenario where they perform the choreography. After more choreography, Aline sings her part, before a mirror, while in the part of Fantine, the singer arrives next to Aline, singing the song, and like the others, she also sings the song in the scenery of mirrors and in the scene where the choreography goes. In the end, all scenes are interspersed, and the girls celebrate in the dance scene, embraced and happy.

== Track listings ==
CD Single

1. "Não Dá Pra Resistir" - 2:57
2. "Não Dá Pra Resistir" (Cuca Dance Mix) - 4:33
3. "Não Dá Pra Resistir" (Cuca Club Mix) - 4:07
