= Popstars (Brazilian TV series) =

- Created by: Jonathan Dowling
- Country of origin: Brazil
- No. of seasons: 2

Original release
- Network: Sistema Brasileiro de Televisão (SBT)
- Release: April 27, 2002 – November 22, 2003

Popstars is a Brazilian reality television series based on the Popstars international series. In Brazil, Popstars was produced by RGB and broadcast on the Brazilian Sistema Brasileiro de Televisão (SBT) channel. Two series was broadcast for two seasons in 2002 and 2003, after which it was discontinued.

Popstars was a prime time program introduced on SBT to counter Rede Globo's two successful reality series, Casa dos Artistas and No Limite. The Brazilian Popstar series was broadcast for two seasons in 2002 and 2003.

An extension of Popstars, Muito Mais Popstars, aired on both SBT and Disney Channel Brazil in 2002, with Disney Channel airing the program on a two-day delay.

== Season 1 (2002) ==
The 2002 season was a competition of female bands to be chosen from prospective singers. It particularly saw the introduction of the girl band Rouge, who finished second in the series, but proved to be a highly successful band with high sales of songs Ragatanga (Asereje), Um Anjo Veio me Falar, Não dá pra Resistir and Beijo Molhado, that were hits in 2002 and 2003. Ragatanga (Asereje) was a Portuñol version of The Ketchup Song" of Las Ketchup. The single sold more than 2 million copies in Brazil.

A Rogue concert aired on Disney Channel Brazil on September 1, 2002.

Marjorie Estiano, a contestant who had been eliminated in the earlier rounds, also became a famous actress with major roles in Rede Globo soap operas like Páginas da Vida (2006), Duas Caras (2007), Caminho das Índias (2009) and A Vida da Gente (2011).

== Season 2 (2003) ==
With the success of the concept, SBT was encouraged to introduce a male version with boys competing for a place in a boy band. The winner was Br'oz that also found great success of releases.

== Discontinuation ==
The program was discontinued after two seasons.
