= Rouge (group) =

Brazilian pop girl group

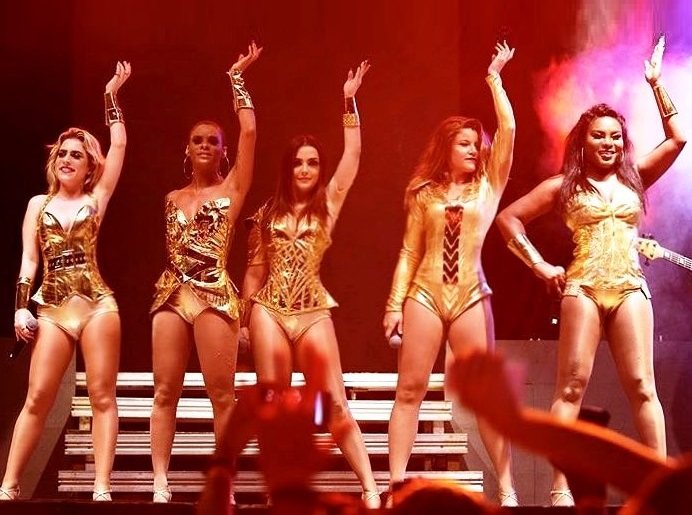
- Rouge performing during their last tour in April 2018. (L–R) Lu Andrade, Aline Wirley, Li Martins, Fantine Thó and Karin Hils.

Background information
- Origin: São Paulo, SP, Brazil
- Genres: Pop; dance-pop
- Years active: 2002–2006; 2013; 2017–2019; 2022
- Labels: Columbia; Sony Music
- Past members: Aline Wirley; Fantine Thó; Karin Hils; Li Martins; Lu Andrade
- Website: www.instagram.com/rouge/

Rouge was a Brazilian pop girl group formed in 2002, consisting of Aline Wirley, Fantine Thó, Karin Hils, Li Martins (then known as Patrícia Lissah) and Lu Andrade. The members of the group were selected during the first season of the Brazilian adaptation of the reality talent show Popstars and mentored by producer Rick Bonadio.

Released in 2002, the group's eponymous debut studio album sold more than 2 million copies in Brazil, becoming the best-selling album by a female group in Latin American history. The success of the album was boosted by the songs "Não Dá pra Resistir", "Beijo Molhado" and, mainly, "Ragatanga", which helped to establish the group on a national platform. Their follow-up album, C'est La Vie (2003) produced the singles "Brilha La Luna" and "Um Anjo Veio Me Falar", while selling over 900,000 copies. After the departure of Andrade, the four remaining members continued and released the albums Blá Blá Blá (2004) and Mil e Uma Noites (2005), containing the singles "Blá Blá Blá", "Sem Você" and "Vem Habib (Wala Wala)". They embarked on several tours throughout Brazil, Angola, Portugal and Uruguay. Despite having sold 6 million records, the group disbanded in June 2006, as their contract with Sony Music was not renewed.

To celebrate their fifteen-year anniversary, the original line-up announced a reunion in 2017, coinciding with their 15 Anos Tour in 2018. The next year they released the songs "Bailando", "Dona da Minha Vida" and "Solo Tu", as well as a fifth studio album, Les 5inq. Following the reunion, an indefinite hiatus was announced, but the group has since reunited for a concert in 2022 for their 20th anniversary.

== Biography ==
=== 2002: Formation on Popstars ===
The origins of the group lie in the talent show Popstars, produced by RGB and broadcast in Brazil by SBT and Disney Channel from April 27 to September 7, 2002. The aim of the show was to form a pop girl group in Brazil and auditions were held country-wide. Over 20 episodes, candidates were whittled down by a panel of five judges. After five qualifying rounds, eight girls were selected for the final stage, and the judges selected Aline Wirley, Fantine Thó, Karin Hils, Li Martins (at the time known as Patrícia Lissa) and Luciana Andrade. The name chosen for the group was Rouge "because it has five letters and also because in French it means red, a color associated with sensuality [...] and it's pop!".

=== 2002–03: Commercial breakthrough with Rouge and C'est La Vie ===
The band released their debut album, Rouge, on August 19, 2002, produced by Rick Bonadio. The label bet heavily on the band and distributed around 150,000 copies of the album in the stores already in first consignment. On the same day, their lead single "Não Dá para Resistir" was released, becoming a hit on the singles charts in Brazil and Argentina. Riding a wave of publicity and hype, the group's second single "Ragatanga", featuring Las Ketchup, instantly reached the top position on the Brazilian charts. The song stayed number one for 11 weeks in Brazil. After five months, the album had sold 1 million copies and was eventually certified double platinum by the Pro-Música Brasil (PMB). Rouge sold over 2 million copies and was the second biggest-selling Brazilian album of 2002. The remix album, titled Rouge Remixes, was released alongside the video album O Sonho de Ser Uma Popstar.

On May 4, 2003, the Rouge released their second album, C'est La Vie. The album blends ballads and dance-pop with soft elements of zouk. According to the members of the group, the debut album had already been finished for the winning band, and were contributing to songwriting on the second album. For example, the song "Um Anjo Veio Me Falar" was written by the five members. The album accumulated upwards of 100,000 sales on the first week of release and peaked at top three in Brazilian charts. Additionally, it was certified Platinum by PMB and finished seventeen on the national year-end chart in 2003. In total, over 900,000 copies were sold. The album spawned three singles, including the band's second non-consecutive number-one "Brilha La Luna", while its second single "Um Anjo Veio Me Falar" also achieved commercial success. They also made their theatrical film debut, in Xuxa Abracadabra, released on December 19, where they appear performing in a nightclub at a certain point in the plot. In celebration of the first year of the group's existence, a concert was held on September 21 for 23,000 spectators at the Pacaembu Stadium in São Paulo. The recording became second Rouge's video album, A Festa dos Seus Sonhos, released on December 22.

=== 2004–06: Blá Blá Blá, Mil e Uma Noites and disbandment ===
On February 11, 2004, Andrade announced her departure from Rouge through a press conference. The singer cited that she was suffering from exhaustion and disillusionment. Rumours of a power struggle with Thó circulated in the press. She revealed in an interview years later that her departure was due to repeated workplace harassment and low pay. The other members said that her departure had a positive effect, as it made them re-evaluate their careers. Rouge announced that they would return to the studios after the end of Carnival in 2004, where they would slow down activities to focus on producing their third studio album. On May 26, 2004, the group released Blá Blá Blá, containing a more mature side of pop music. From the album, four singles were taken: the title track and "Sem Você" reached the top five on the Brazilian charts. However, with a total of about 150,000 copies sold, it failed to achieve the success of its two best-selling predecessors, though it still achieved gold. To promote the album, the group embarked on the Tour Blá Blá Blá (2004–2005), which brought rearrangements of old songs, in addition to the performance of new ones, with a new group of instrumentalists, and the addition of four dancers participating in choreographies with the girls.

On June 26, 2005, the group's fourth studio album and first greatest hits was released, Mil e Uma Noites. The album contained six new tracks and eight from the band's previous catalog. The Arabic pop-influenced leading single "Vem Habib (Wala Wala)" reached the top five of the charts. At the end of 2005, the press reported that the group would split up the following year, due to the end of their contract with Sony. In August 2006, they announced they were going their separate ways, concentrating on their individual solo careers.

=== 2012–16: Comeback attempt ===
In late 2012, rumours about a return restarted on social networks, especially Twitter, as Bonadio posted the hashtag #VoltaRouge (en: Come Back Rouge). Some meetings of the girls were noticed and published through the web. Officially, a return of the band was confirmed by Bonadio and the girls itself, although Andrade refused to join the band members, saying that she needed to be truthful with herself and her decision. She had also said: "They are Rouge, the girls that stayed. They are the soul of the group, so they are the ones who must come back". A tour commemorating 10 years of creation of the group was confirmed for 2013, in Brazil. Along with it, a new Reality Show for Multishow, Fabrica de Estrelas, broadcast was announced for Bonadio to select girls for a new girlgroup. Rouge will have some appearances on the show showing the process of composition, recording and release of two new singles. The new single, "Tudo É Rouge" (en: It's All Rouge) was confirmed for releasing April 2013, along with the start of the new reality show. Fantine shares that she went scouting for songs knowing Rouge would soon be recording, Luke Christopher, songwriter and rapper who works alongside Common, sent them "No Feeling", "love at first sight" said Fantine. Karin and Fantine wrote the Portuguese version of the original song and released "Tudo Outra Vez" (en: All again).

Despite all efforts, though, bureaucracy got in their way as they were not the legal owners of the name and brand Rouge, this being owned by their previous recording label. Bonadio and the girls decided on quitting the plans for a return as well as the release of single "Tudo É Rouge", and an apologizing letter for the fans was released through social media.

=== 2017–2019: Reunion, tour and second disbandment ===
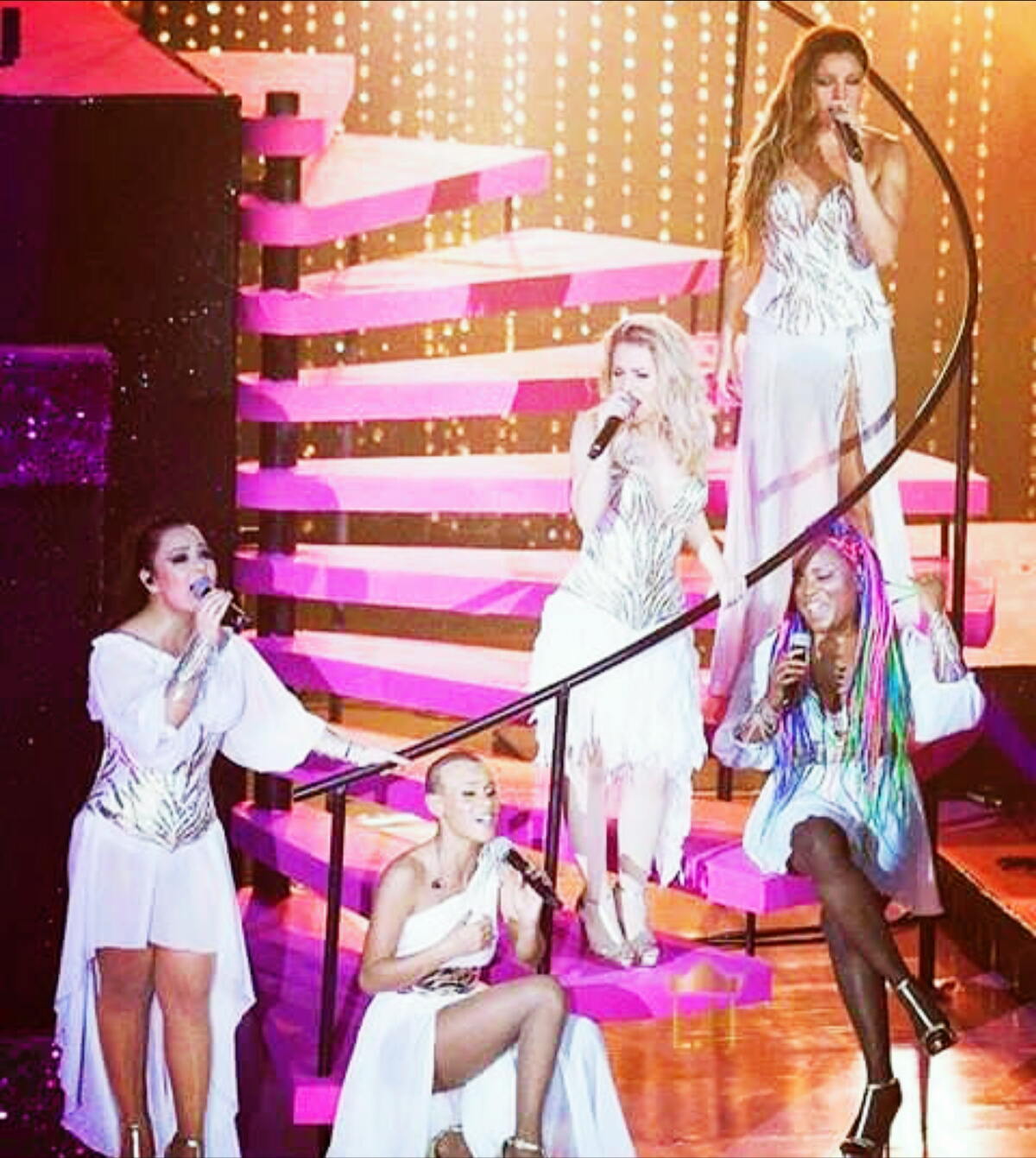
Rouge performing in a concert in 2017.

In August of 2017, the 15th anniversary of the Rouge was intensely celebrated by the fans and all the former members. On September 13, the group's comeback with the original line-up was announced. On the day after, tickets were put up for sale and sold out within a minute. After three hours, the event's organizers announced that the five thousand tickets had been officially sold out and an extra show was scheduled for the following day. A new extra show was scheduled for December 2, and had sold out the same day. In October 2017, it was confirmed that Rouge had returned definitively.

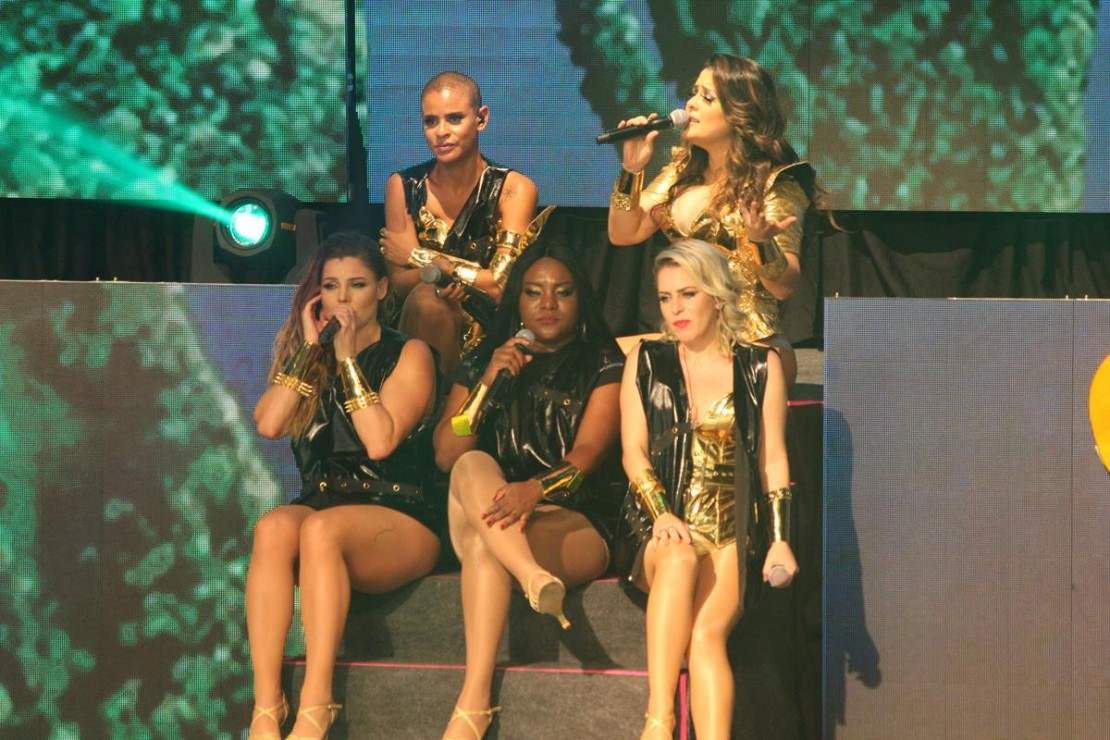
Rouge performing "Olha Só" in Curitiba, Paraná at the 15 Anos Tour.

The group's comeback first single, "Bailando" was released in January 2018. In late 2017, the girls officially announced their reunion tour Rouge 15 Anos. It began on January 27, 2018, in Fortaleza, Ceará and concluded on August 11, in Recife, Pernambuco. On August 21, the group announced their second single after the comeback "Dona da Minha Vida". The track was officially released on August 31. On January 24, 2019, the group announced through its official pages that they would enter into an indefinite break and on February 1 the fifth album Les 5inq was released and on the 4th, the Rouge Sessions - De Portas Abertas.

== Merchandise and sponsorship deals ==
Before Rouge became a commercial success, there was already a plan by its producers to release several products using the name of the members of the group, and the brand Rouge itself. Initially, the group starred commercials for Mother's Day and Christmas by Marisa's retail clothing stores and even with autographed stickers of the members being distributed through Marisa's stores in Brazil. On September 9, 2003, the toy company Baby Brink released dolls of the five group members. In 2004 the Rouge also secured a contract with Arcor, a company that released chewing gum, confectionery and Easter eggs, all with the image of the members. More than seven types of products were produced.

In 2003, Editora Abril released a Rouge-themed sticker album, with 180 stickers for fans of the group to collect. The same year Grendene released sandals with the group logo. In 2011, Tilibra released a line of Rouge-themed notebooks, with a different color for each notebook.

== Public image and impact ==
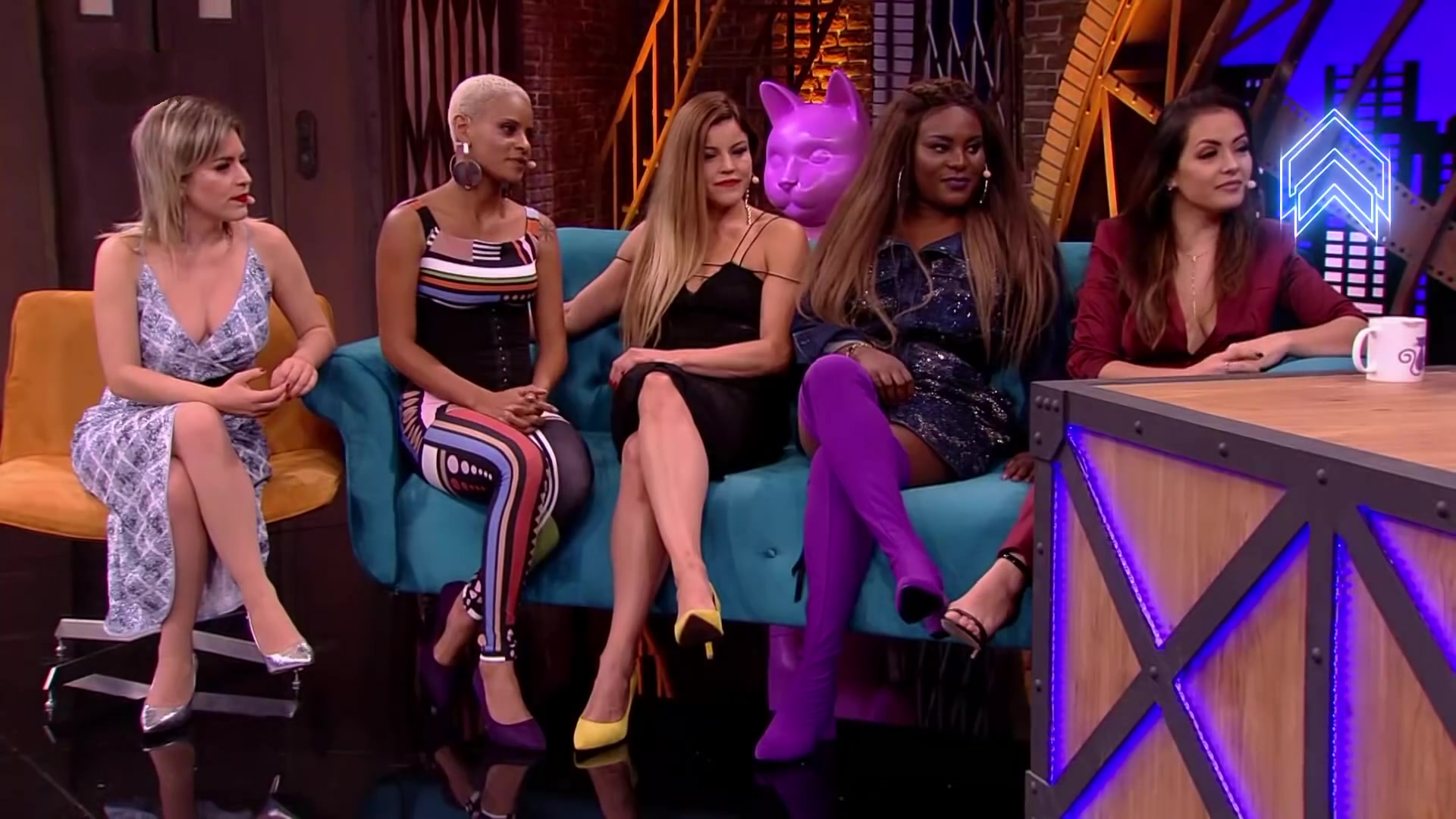
Rouge being interviewed on Multishow in 2018.

During their career, Rouge became one of Brazil's record-breaking acts, with more than 6 million albums sold, being the best-selling girl group in Brazil and Latin America. One of the group's albums also appears in the list of the best selling albums in the history of the Brazilian music industry – the debut album of the group, certificated double platinum. Described as the "Brazilian Spice Girls", some vehicles credited the group for being part of Brazilian pop; Some critics called them "laboratory rats" and "pop cinderellas."

Eduardo Coelho of Fatos Desconhecidos website revered the reality show Popstars for revealing the group, writing that "even with the pros and cons of the format, something that is undeniable with regards to reality shows on national soil is that they at least created, shaped and produced a true phenomenon called: Rouge, in the year 2002". The writer also praised the group's most successful song "Ragatanga", claiming it impossible to forget and saying its choreography is epic. Cristiano Freitas, from the website A Escotilha, defined the contribution of the group to Brazilian pop as a "major phenomenon of the genre ever revealed in Brazil." Diário do Nordeste credited the group for giving "face to pure Brazilian pop music, bringing the "girl band" concept to Brazil, popularized especially by the Spice Girls. Journalist Diego Bargas from the site Folha compared Rouge even further to the Spice Girls, stating that both have many similarities. Like Rouge, the British quintet experienced the meteoric success still young; at their career momentum, they both suffered the departure of a member. Both groups had little time in total activity, but they have kept many fans."

Several artists cited Rouge as an influence in some aspect in their careers; among them are the Brazilian singers Anitta, Pabllo Vittar, Gloria Groove, the girl group Girls, and the actors Maisa Silva, Tiago Abravanel, and Fernanda Souza.

== Discography ==
- Rouge (2002)
- C'est La Vie (2003)
- Blá Blá Blá (2004)
- Mil e Uma Noites (2005)
- Les 5inq (2019)

== Concert tours ==
Headlining

- Popstar Tour (2002–03)
- C'est La Vie Tour (2003–04)
- Blá Blá Blá Tour (2004)
- Mil e Uma Noites Tour (2005)
- 15 Anos Tour (2018)

Co-headlining

- Planeta Pop: Rouge & Br'oz Tour (2004)

Promotional tours

- Chá Rouge Tour (2017–22)

== Filmography ==
=== Television ===
Year	Name	Role	Notes
2002	Popstars	Contestants	20 episodes
2002	Muito Mais Popstars	Themselves	TV hosts
2005	Floribella	Themselves	Episode: "July 14"
2013	Fábrica de Estrelas	Themselves	Episode: "A Volta do Rouge"; Episode: "Tudo É Rouge"; Episode: "Faria Tudo Outra Vez"

=== Film ===
Year	Name	Role
2002	Xuxa Abracadabra	Themselves

== Awards and nominations ==
Year	Award	Category	Nomination	Result
2002	Prêmio Qualidade Brasil	Best New Group	Rouge	Won
2002	Prêmio Austregésilo de Athayde	Best New Group	Rouge	Won
2002	Prêmio Jovem Brasil	Best New Group	Rouge	Won
2002	Prêmio Jovem Brasil	Best Song	Ragatanga	Won
2003	Video Music Brasil	Viewer's Choice	Brilha La Luna	Nominated
2003	Prêmio Multishow	Best New Group	Rouge	Won
2003	Prêmio Multishow	Best DVD	O Sonho de Ser Uma Popstar	Nominated
2003	Prêmio Miscelânea Design (ABRE)	Best Music Album Art	CD + DVD C'est La Vie	Won
2003	Meus Prêmios Nick (Nickelodeon's Kids Choice Awards Brazil)	Best Song	Brilla La Luna	Won
2003	Meus Prêmios Nick (Nickelodeon's Kids Choice Awards Brazil)	Best Video	Brilla La Luna	Won
2003	Prêmio Troféu Imprensa	Best Group	Rouge	Won
2004	Video Music Brasil	Viewer's Choice	Blá Blá Blá	Nominated
2004	Prêmio Academia Brasileira de Letras	Best Group	Rouge	Won
2004	Prêmio Troféu Imprensa	Best Group	Rouge	Won
2005	Meus Prêmios Nick (Nickelodeon's Kids Choice Awards Brazil)	Best Group	Rouge	Won
2017	Prêmio Contigo	Best Group	Rouge	Won

== See also ==
- List of best-selling girl groups
- List of girl groups
