= The Ketchup Song (Aserejé) =

2002 single by Las Ketchup

Single by Las Ketchup

from the album Hijas del Tomate
- Language: Spanish; Spanglish
- Released: 10 June 2002
- Studio: Lolmang
- Genre: Europop; reggae; Latin pop; novelty
- Length: 3:32
- Label: Columbia; Shaketown Music
- Songwriter: Manuel Ruiz
- Producer: Manuel Ruiz

Las Ketchup singles chronology
"The Ketchup Song (Aserejé)" (2002)	"Kusha Las Payas" (2002)

Music videos
- "Aserejé" on YouTube; "Aserejé" (Spanglish version) on YouTube

"The Ketchup Song (Aserejé)" (Andalusian pronunciation: [aseɾeˈhe]) is a song by Spanish pop group Las Ketchup, released as the lead single from their debut studio album, Hijas del Tomate (2002). The song is about a young man who enters a nightclub while singing and dancing. In addition to the original Spanish version, the song exists in a form with Spanglish verses, although the nonsensical chorus is identical in both versions.

"The Ketchup Song" was released on 10 June 2002 as Las Ketchup's debut single and became an international hit. It reached number one in at least 20 European countries and became the most successful hit of 2002 in eight of them. It also topped the music charts of Australia, Canada, and New Zealand but stalled at number 54 in the United States. In Central and South America, the song became a number-one airplay hit. As of 2014, the song had sold over 12 million copies worldwide. The song's dance routine was a popular novelty dance in the early 2000s.

== Background ==
"The Ketchup Song (Asereje) (Spanish Version)"
20-second sample, which includes the chorus

Las Ketchup was first introduced to Columbia Records through Shaketown Music, a small record label in Córdoba, Andalusia, who sent out the group's demo to a number of different record companies. The demo featured the songs "Aserejé" and "Kusha Las Payas". When A&R Javier Portugués and Columbia director Raúl López listened to the demo, they stared at each other in delight exclaiming, "Wow, this is fantastic!" At first the intention was to arrange a distribution deal with ShakeTown Music but upon hearing the song they realised its international potential and so negotiated for Las Ketchup to sign with Sony.

== Composition ==
"The Ketchup Song" is about a young man named Diego who enters a nightclub. The DJ, a friend of Diego's, plays Diego's favorite song, "Rapper's Delight" by the Sugarhill Gang, and Diego dances and sings along to the song, imitating its chorus with Spanish gibberish.

"Aserejé" is, therefore, a meaningless word, being part of a somewhat incorrect imitation of the original song's chorus

I said a hip-hop the hippie	Aserejé, ja, dejé
to the hippie	dejebet
The hip, hip-a-hop and you don't stop	tu dejebe
rock it to the bang, bang the boogie	de sei bi uno uma
say up jump the boogie	majavi an de bugui
To the rhythm of the boogie, the beat.	an de buigi, dipi.

The song is written in the key of E♭ minor and has a tempo of 94 beats per minute, in cut time. It follows the chord progression of E♭m–D♭–C♭–A♭m–B♭7 in the chorus. The pre-chorus uses an altered chord (B minor), or a modal interchange, as the cadence. According to Pandora.com, the song features "mixed acoustic and electric instrumentation, humorous lyrics, and electric guitar riffs".

== Dance routine ==
For the first dance move, the hands must be held open facing down and continuously waving them over another two times for six beats. The second involves tossing the thumb over the shoulder twice, right before spinning one's arm around each other while raising from the waistline to face level. The last move of the dance involves placing the back of one's hand on the forehead and the palm of the other hand on the back of the head while knocking one's knees together a couple of times.

== Critical reception ==
Andy Thomas from Drowned in Sound gave the song a 9 out of 10, stating, "The Ketchup Song is better than the Macarena...", while acknowledging that the song is "not smart, it's not clever, and it's not going to get a single positive review outside of the teeny bop press." Thomas described the song's band members (Las Ketchup) as "three slightly odd-looking women from Spain who are the proud exponents of this year's Macarena. It's got dance moves (wiggle your hands, thumb a lift, raise your arms, knock your knees together) and a sunny video where the trio serve drinks in a beach bar."

== Commercial performance ==
The song reached number one in every country it charted in except for Croatia, Japan, and the United States, peaking at numbers 10, 15, and 54, respectively. In France, the song reached number one for 11 weeks and eventually sold 1,310,000 copies, making it the best-selling single of 2002, and the second-best-selling of the 21st century in the country, behind "Un Monde parfait" by Ilona Mitrecey. Furthermore, the song was the 50th best-selling single of the 2000s in the UK. The song was a radio hit in Central and South America, topping the airplay charts of Argentina, Chile, Colombia, Ecuador, Peru, and Venezuela.

== Music video ==
The music video was shot at Palm Beach, Estepona in Spain, at Chiringuito bar. Two other music videos were also produced for the song.

The main video starts with the female band members laying out a carpet on the ground and putting the bar stools on display to set up their musical show. They then serve people exotic beverages at the beach bar. A male bar attendant enthusiastically pours a drink in a glass and juggles a bottle around. Meanwhile, more and more beach-goers are shown drawn into the bar, to watch the trio's performance. In some shots of the video, the trio would be performing near wooden window frames which are laid individually on the sandy beach.

During the song's chorus, the band members perform their signature dance moves, alongside other visitors who also joyously participate. The band are helped up to a table, where they execute their Aserejé dance in front of a larger, jubilant crowd who gleefully jive in to the dance. By the end of the video, the crowd becomes jam-packed, with the young and old dancing to the song near the beach bar.

=== Other music videos ===
The second music video involve the band members in a futuristic club pursuing an afro-haired love interest. The third music video is a sing-along video with the band members performing against a white background as the lyrics are displayed onscreen with a letterboxed border featuring the band's logo.

== Controversy ==
Although the band has explained that "aserejé" is a meaningless word derived from "Rapper's Delight", rumors and conspiracy theories spread through e-mail, especially in Latin America, that the gibberish lyrics included hidden demonic references that would lead the listener to Satanism and heresy.

The phrases from the Spanish lyrics which were claimed to be references to Satanism include:

- "Aserejé", which can be broken down into the Spanish phrase "a ser hereje", meaning "let's be heretical".
- "Ja, de je, de jebe tu de jebere" – "Ja" would here be the beginning of the Tetragrammaton referring to Jehova (God). The phrase would therefore be "Jehova, deja tu ser" ("Jehova (God), let go of your being").
- "Y donde más no cabe un alma" ("where there isn't room for a soul"), supposedly referring to hell.
- "Y el DJ que lo conoce toca el himno de las 12" ("the DJ who knows him plays the midnight anthem"), supposedly referring to Satanic rituals which occur at midnight.

A Dominican television station banned the song.

== Track listings ==
Spanish CD single
No.	Title	Length
1.	"Aserejé" (album version)	3:30
2.	"Aserejé" (karaoke version)	3:30

European maxi-CD single
No.	Title	Length
1.	"The Ketchup Song (Aserejé)" (Spanglish version)	3:32
2.	"The Ketchup Song (Aserejé)" (album version)	3:32
3.	"The Ketchup Song (Aserejé)" (Chiringuito Club single edit)	3:41
4.	"The Ketchup Song (Aserejé)" (Motown Club single edit)	3:41

UK CD1
No.	Title	Length
1.	"The Ketchup Song (Aserejé)" (Spanglish version)	3:32
2.	"The Ketchup Song (Aserejé)" (D-Bop's Latin House mix)	7:16
3.	"The Ketchup Song (Aserejé)" (karaoke version)	3:43
4.	"The Ketchup Song (Aserejé)" (Spanglish version video)

UK CD2
No.	Title	Length
1.	"The Ketchup Song (Aserejé)" (Crystal Sound Xmas mix)	3:50
2.	"The Ketchup Song (Aserejé)" (karaoke version)	3:44
3.	"The Ketchup Song (Aserejé)" (Chiringuito Club mix)	5:30
4.	"The Ketchup Song (Aserejé)" (Crystal Sound Xmas mix video)

UK cassette single
No.	Title	Length
1.	"The Ketchup Song (Aserejé)" (Spanglish version)	3:32
2.	"The Ketchup Song (Aserejé)" (Motown Club single edit)	3:41

Australian CD1
No.	Title	Length
1.	"The Ketchup Song (Aserejé)" (Spanglish video version)	3:32
2.	"The Ketchup Song (Aserejé)" (Sunshine Mix Spanglish edit)	3:17
3.	"The Ketchup Song (Aserejé)" (Sunshine Full Vocal Spanglish)	5:14
4.	"The Ketchup Song (Aserejé)" (Motown Club instrumental)	6:12

Australian CD2
No.	Title	Length
1.	"The Ketchup Song (Aserejé)" (Crystal Sound Xmas mix)	3:51
2.	"The Ketchup Song (Aserejé)" (Spanglish version)	3:33
3.	"The Ketchup Song (Aserejé)" (Sunshine mix edit Spanglish)	3:19
4.	"The Ketchup Song (Aserejé)" (Sunshine Full Vocal Spanglish)	5:14
5.	"The Ketchup Song (Aserejé)" (Motown Club instrumental)	6:07

US CD single
No.	Title	Length
1.	"The Ketchup Song (Hey Hah)" (album version)	3:32
2.	"The Ketchup Song (Hey Hah)" (Spanglish version)	3:32

Japanese CD single
No.	Title	Length
1.	"The Ketchup Song (アセレヘ～魔法のケチャップ・ソング)" (Spanglish version)
2.	"The Ketchup Song (アセレヘ～魔法のケチャップ・ソング)" (Sunshine Mix Spanglish edit)
3.	"The Ketchup Song (アセレヘ～魔法のケチャップ・ソング)" (karaoke version)

== Charts ==
=== Weekly charts ===
2002–2003 weekly chart performance for "The Ketchup Song (Aserejé)"
Chart (2002–2003)	Peak position
Australia (ARIA)	1
Austria (Ö3 Austria Top 40)	1
Belgium (Ultratop 50 Flanders)	1
Belgium (Ultratop 50 Wallonia)	1
Canada (Billboard)	1
Croatia International Airplay (Top lista)	10
Czech Republic (IFPI)	1
Denmark (Tracklisten)	1
Europe (Eurochart Hot 100)	1
Finland (Suomen virallinen lista)	1
France (SNEP)	1
Germany (GfK)	1
Greece (IFPI)	1
Hungary (Single Top 40)	1
Ireland (IRMA)	1
Italy (FIMI)	1
Japan (Oricon)	15
Netherlands (Dutch Top 40)	1
Netherlands (Single Top 100)	1
New Zealand (Recorded Music NZ)	1
Norway (VG-lista)	1
Poland (Nislen Music Control)	1
Portugal (AFP)	1
Romania (Romanian Top 100)	1
Scottish Singles Sales (Official Charts)	1
Spain (Promusicae)	1
Sweden (Sverigetopplistan)	1
Switzerland (Schweizer Hitparade)	1
UK Singles (Official Charts)	1
US Billboard Hot 100	54
US Hot Latin Tracks (Billboard)	1
US Latin Pop Airplay (Billboard)	1
US Tropical/Salsa Airplay (Billboard)	1

2008–2025 weekly chart performance for "The Ketchup Song (Aserejé)"
Chart (2008–2025)	Peak position
Kazakhstan Airplay (TopHit)	116
Moldova Airplay (TopHit)	28
Ukraine Airplay (TopHit)	16

=== Monthly charts ===
Monthly chart performance for "The Ketchup Song (Aserejé)"
Chart (2025)	Peak position
Moldova Airplay (TopHit)	57

=== Year-end charts ===
2002 year-end chart performance for "The Ketchup Song (Aserejé)"
Chart (2002)	Position
Australia (ARIA)	3
Austria (Ö3 Austria Top 40)	2
Belgium (Ultratop 50 Flanders)	1
Belgium (Ultratop 50 Wallonia)	1
Canada (Billboard)	7
Europe (Eurochart Hot 100)	1
France (SNEP)	1
Germany (Media Control)	1
Ireland (IRMA)	3
Italy (FIMI)	1
Netherlands (Dutch Top 40)	1
Netherlands (Single Top 100)	1
Spain (AFYVE)	1
Sweden (Hitlistan)	1
Switzerland (Schweizer Hitparade)	1
UK Singles (OCC)	8
US Hot Latin Tracks (Billboard)	39
US Latin Pop Airplay (Billboard)	33
US Tropical/Salsa Airplay (Billboard)	26

2003 year-end chart performance for "The Ketchup Song (Aserejé)"
Chart (2003)	Position
Australia (ARIA)	8
Austria (Ö3 Austria Top 40)	23
Belgium (Ultratop 50 Wallonia)	62
France (SNEP)	24
Germany (Media Control GfK)	58
Ireland (IRMA)	86
Sweden (Hitlistan)	51
Switzerland (Schweizer Hitparade)	45
UK Singles (OCC)	171

=== Decade-end charts ===
Decade-end chart performance for "The Ketchup Song (Aserejé)"
Chart (2000–2009)	Position
Australia (ARIA)	11
Austria (Ö3 Austria Top 40)	14
Germany (Media Control GfK)	8
Netherlands (Single Top 100)	1

=== All-time charts ===
All-time chart performance for "The Ketchup Song (Aserejé)"
Chart	Position
Belgium (Ultratop 50 Flanders)	9
Ireland (IRMA)	18

== Certifications and sales ==
Certifications and sales for "The Ketchup Song (Aserejé)"
Region	Certification	Certified units/sales
Australia (ARIA)	3× Platinum	210,000^{^}
Austria (IFPI Austria)	2× Platinum	60,000^{*}
Belgium (BRMA)	5× Platinum	250,000^{*}
Denmark (IFPI Danmark)	2× Platinum	16,000^{^}
Finland (Musiikkituottajat)	Platinum	15,483
France (SNEP)	Diamond	1,310,000
Germany (BVMI)	2× Platinum	1,000,000^{^}
Greece (IFPI Greece)	2× Platinum	40,000^{^}
Italy	—	300,000
Japan (RIAJ)	Gold	50,000^{^}
Netherlands (NVPI)	Platinum	60,000^{^}
New Zealand (RMNZ)	2× Platinum	20,000^{*}
Norway (IFPI Norway)	6× Platinum	
Spain (Promusicae)	Platinum	100,000
Sweden (GLF)	4× Platinum	120,000^{^}
Switzerland (IFPI Switzerland)	3× Platinum	120,000^{^}
United Kingdom (BPI)	Platinum	600,000^{^}
Summaries
Worldwide	—	12,000,000
^{*} Sales figures based on certification alone.^{^} Shipments figures based on certification alone.

== Release history ==
Release dates and formats for "The Ketchup Song (Aserejé)"
Region	Date	Format(s)	Label(s)	Ref.
Spain	10 June 2002	12-inch vinyl; CD	Columbia; Shaketown Music	
Italy	July 2002	12-inch vinyl; CD	Columbia; Shaketown Music	
Denmark	29 July 2002	Maxi-CD	Columbia; Shaketown Music	
Europe	2 August 2002	CD	Columbia; Shaketown Music	
France	10 September 2002	CD	Columbia; Shaketown Music	
Australia	7 October 2002	CD1	Columbia; Shaketown Music	
United Kingdom	7 October 2002	CD1; cassette	Columbia	
Canada	15 October 2002	CD	Columbia; Shaketown Music	
United States	19 November 2002	12-inch vinyl	Columbia	
Japan	27 November 2002	CD	Sony	
United Kingdom	9 December 2002	CD2 (Christmas edition)	Columbia	
Australia	16 December 2002	CD2 (Christmas edition)	Columbia; Shaketown Music	
Belgium	18 December 2002	Maxi-CD (Christmas edition)	Columbia	

== Rouge version ==
"Ragatanga"

Single by Rouge featuring Las Ketchup

from the album Rouge
- Language: Portuguese; Portuñol
- Released: 31 August 2002
- Genre: Dance-pop
- Length: 3:18
- Label: Columbia; Sony
- Songwriters: Manuel Ruiz; Rick Bonadio
- Producer: Rick Bonadio (Portuguese version only)

Rouge singles chronology
"Não Dá pra Resistir" (2002)	"Ragatanga" (2002)	"Beijo Molhado" (2003)

Audio sample
- file; help

Music video
- "Ragatanga" on YouTube

The Brazilian pop girl group Rouge covered "The Ketchup Song". The song was adapted into Portuguese by Rick Bonadio as "Ragatanga" and Columbia Records and Sony released it on 31 August 2002, as the second single from their eponymous debut studio album (2002). It was one of the most successful songs in Brazil in 2002 and is Rouge's most successful single. According to the media the song was played over 15 times a day on Brazilian radio stations.

=== Background and composition ===
When selecting tracks for the group's debut album, Liminha, in a meeting with Sony representatives from around the world, expressed the need for a repertoire tailored for a Brazilian release. This led to the inclusion of the song "Aserejé" from Spain, though it nearly didn't make the cut. According to Alexandre Schiavo, marketing's vice president for Sony Music Brasil, the album's song list was finalized until the last minute when "Aserejé" caught their attention. Rick Bonadio then crafted a version transforming it into "Ragatanga", featuring a chorus—"Aserehe ra de re De hebe tu de hebere seibiunouba mahabi"—that, according to Schiavo, holds no specific meaning, akin to the gibberish sung by those unfamiliar with English. Bonadio emphasized the importance of fidelity to the original song rather than attempting to reinvent it. The Brazilian rendition blends Spanish and Portuguese, with the participation of Las Ketchup.

=== Commercial performance ===
"Ragatanga" became a viral success in Brazil, winning the charts quickly. The song reached the longest-reigning number one on the Brazilian Charts with 11 weeks.

=== Legacy ===
"Ragatanga" was a resounding hit in Brazil, making Rouge not only popular in the country, but in some other parts of the world. The single was taken as the song that boosted sales of the band's debut album. After only two months of hitting the stores, the album reached the mark of 730,000 sold copies and became favorite to the title of commercial champion of 2002. Besides, the song did not leave the top of the charts. The song was also considered as the reason for the tickets for the group's debut concert on 14 November 2002, at ATL Hall in Rio de Janeiro, to be sold out. By that time, the album had already reached the mark of 950,000 copies.

Billboard magazine ran a photo story of Rouge in the October 2002 issue. The report showed production details, a crossover of hits on the radio, and talks a little about the first tour they did for Brazil. In addition to talking about the hits "Ragatanga" and "Não Dá pra Resistir", they also spoke about their international career, with Rouge performing in Argentina with great success, and the intention to launch the group's CD in Chile and Peru.

=== Music video ===
On 31 August 2002, the music video for "Ragatanga" premiered. The video is simple; it shows the group performing a choreographed dance at a nightclub, while the lyrics of the chorus are displayed in the video. The Las Ketchup make cameo appearances in the video, singing the chorus. The choreography was also imported from Spain, but according to the Rouge's members: "We added a new movement, which is the sign of asking for a ride."

=== Track listing ===
CD single

1. "Ragatanga (Aserejé)" (Album Version)
2. "Ragatanga (Aserejé)" (Radio Edit)
3. "Ragatanga (Aserejé)" (Memê's Da Carnival Beat Remix)
4. "Ragatanga (Aserejé)" (Cuca Rnb Mix)

CD single (Remixes)

1. "Ragatanga (Aserejé)" (Memê's Summer Heat Mix) – 4:09
2. "Ragatanga (Aserejé)" (Da Carnival Beat Mix) – 4:09

=== Charts ===
Weekly chart performance for "Ragatanga"
Chart (2002)	Peak position
Brazil (Brasil Hot 100 Airplay)	1

== Covers and other versions ==
In 2012, Brazilian singer Kelly Key made a cover of the song, for the collection Festa Kids (2012). The re-recording was harshly criticized by Internet users for making the song "bland". In 2013, in a concert held in a nightclub in São Paulo, singer Wanessa summoned Li Martins to sing some songs, among them "Ragatanga". Still in 2013, the song "Ramón" by girl band Girls (formed and produced by the same producer of Rouge, Rick Bonadio), included in the band's first studio album, was compared to "Ragatanga" due to its Latin rhythm and the protagonist of the song, which was considered the new Diego at the time. The song was also covered in Japanese by the girl group Soltomatina.

Wiggy by Young Miko samples the song in 2024 can be heard in NBA 2k24.

== See also ==
- List of best-selling Latin singles
- List of Romanian Top 100 number ones of the 2000s
