= Gabriel Santana =

Brazilian actor

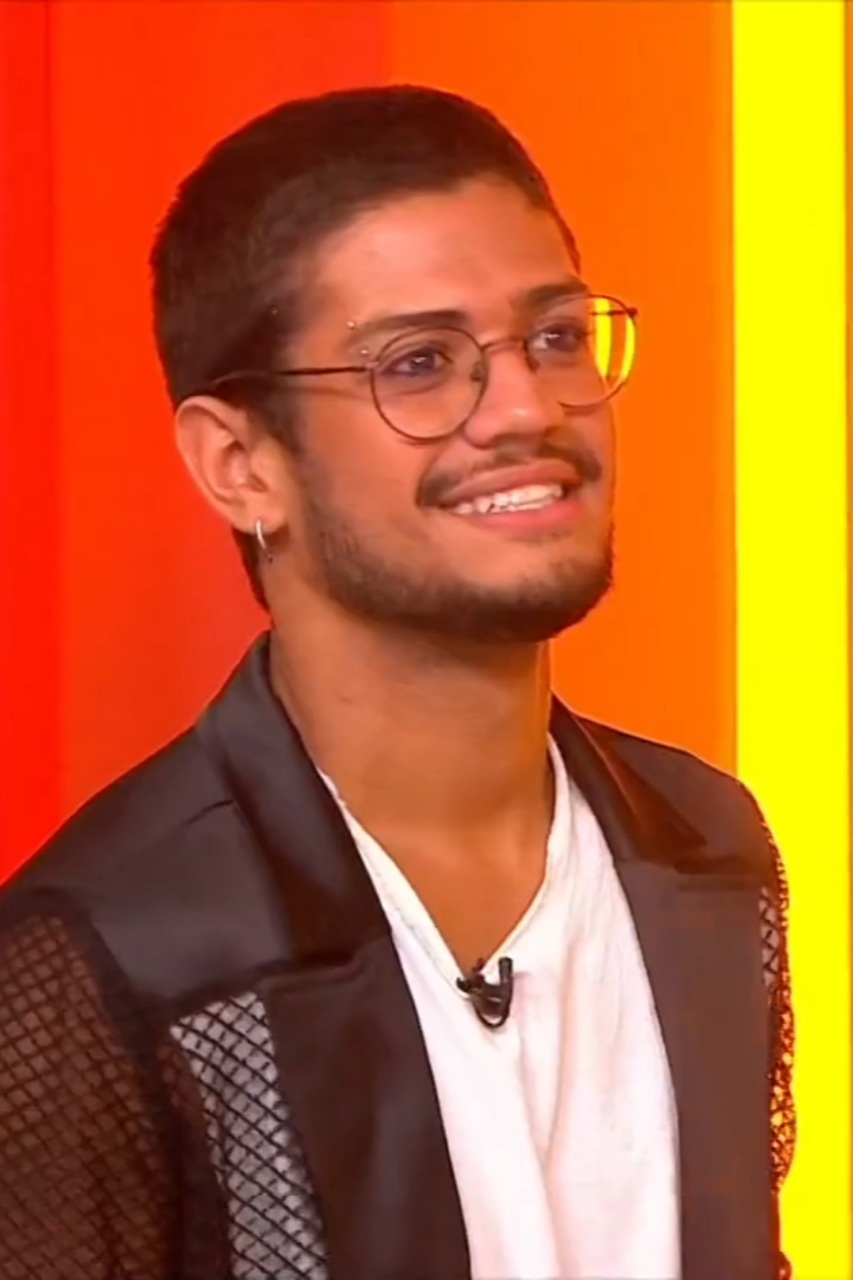
- Santana on the program A Eliminação, in 2023
- Born: Gabriel Cordeiro Santana; September 27, 1999 (age 26); Rio de Janeiro, Brazil
- Occupation: Actor
- Years active: 2013–present
- Height: 1.75 m (5 ft 9 in)

Gabriel Cordeiro Santana (born September 27, 1999) is a Brazilian actor. He became known for playing Mosca, one of the protagonists of the remake of Chiquititas in 2013, Cléber in Malhação: Toda Forma de Amar in 2019, and Renato in the remake of Pantanal in 2022, being one of the highlights of the plot. In 2023, he participated in the twenty-third edition of Big Brother Brasil.

== Career ==
He became known for being one of the protagonists in the remake of the children's soap opera Chiquititas, playing the orphan Mosca. In 2018, he starred in the series Z4, a partnership between SBT and Disney Channel, playing the dancer Paulo. In 2019, he signed with TV Globo and joined the cast of Malhação: Toda Forma de Amar, playing Cléber, one of the central characters and romantic partner of Anjinha (Caroline Dallarosa). After participating in the culinary talent show Bake Off Celebridades on SBT, he returns to Globo as part of the cast of the second version of Pantanal, as the controversial Renato, one of the children of Zuleika (Aline Borges) and Tenório (Murilo Benício).

In 2023, he is announced as one of the participants in the reality show Big Brother Brasil in its twenty-third season, joining the group "Camarote". In the same year, he came out as bisexual, biromantic and demisexual. He was the 11th eliminated from BBB 23, with 56.45% of the votes to eliminate him from the competition, in a dispute with singer Aline Wirley and actress Bruna Griphao.

He assumed on June 12, 2024, Valentine's Day (in Brazil), that he was in a relationship with the writer Erick Mafra.

== Filmography ==
=== Television ===
Year	Title	Role	Notes	Ref.
2013–15	Chiquititas	Felipe Tavares (Mosca)		
2016	Dance se Puder	Participant (4th place)	Season 1	
2017	Carcereiros	Leonardo Viera (Léo)		
2018	Z4	Paulo Almeida dos Santos		
2019–20	Malhação: Toda Forma de Amar	Cléber Braga		
2021	Bake Off Celebridades	Participant (8th place)	Season 1	
2022	Pantanal	Renato Gonçalves dos Santos		
2023	Big Brother Brasil	Participant (11th place)	Season 23	

=== Film ===
Year	Title	Role	Notes
2017	Eu Fico Loko	Luka	
2019	Ana	João Paulo	
2023	Made In Favela	Hungria	

=== Dubbing ===
Year	Title	Role
2023	Ruby Gillman, Teenage Kraken	Connor (Brazilian voice)

== Theater ==
Year	Title	Role
2019	Querubim	Luis

== Awards and nominations ==
Year	Award	Category	Appointment	Results
2014	Troféu Internet	Best Actor	Chiquititas	Nominated
2014	Prêmio Contigo! de TV	Best Child Actor	Chiquititas	Nominated
2015	Troféu Internet	Best Actor	Chiquititas	Nominated
2016	Prêmio Contigo! de TV	Best Child Actor	Chiquititas	Nominated
2016	Prêmio Jovens em Destaque de São Paulo	Featured Young People	Himself	Won
2018	Prêmio Jovem Brasileiro	Best Actor	Z4	Nominated
2019	Meus Prêmios Nick	Revelation of the Year	Malhação: Toda Forma de Amar	Nominated
2023	Prêmio Jovem Brasileiro	Best Reality Participant	Big Brother Brasil 23	Nominated
2023	Prêmio Jovem Brasileiro	My Crush	Gabriel Santana	Nominated
2023	Prêmio Jovem Brasileiro	Most Stylish Young Man	Gabriel Santana	Nominated
2023	Prêmio Jovem Brasileiro	I Shipp	Gabriel and Bruna Griphao	Nominated
