= Fred Nicácio =

Brazilian doctor, presenter, and digital influencer

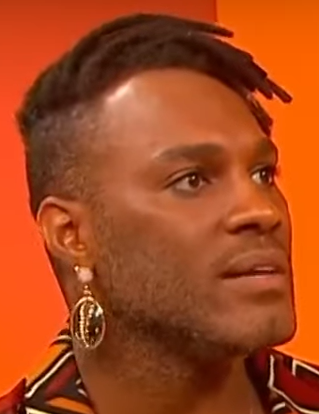
- Fred Nicácio in 2023
- Born: Fred William Nicácio Souza de Oliveira; 23 February 1987 (age 39); Campos dos Goytacazes, Rio de Janeiro, Brazil
- Occupations: Doctor, physical therapist, reality show participant, TV presenter
- Spouse: Fábio Gelonese

Fred William Nicácio Souza de Oliveira (born 23 February 1987) is a Brazilian doctor, television presenter, physical therapist, and digital influencer. After going viral online in 2018, he became a presenter on the Brazilian version of Queer Eye. He became known nationally for his participation on Big Brother Brasil 23, where he was eliminated, but then returned through the "Repechage Twist" portion of the show.

== Life and career ==
A native of Campos dos Goytacazes, in the state of Rio de Janeiro, he is a practicing doctor in the field of dermatology and intensive therapy. He graduated with a degree in physical therapy, worked for 14 years in the Sistema Único de Saúde (SUS), and also did voluntary work at field hospitals during the COVID-19 pandemic. He is married to Fábio Gelonese, a dentist, and is in an open relationship. He currently lives in the city of Bauru, São Paulo.

Before his participation on Big Brother Brasil 23, Nicácio went viral online in 2018 for one of his medical appointments being in Brazilian Sign Language (Libras) for a couple that had hearing issues. "I am this humanizing doctor that is worried about what the soul of that patient needs", he affirms. Surprised and happy, the elderly woman at the appointment mentioned that it was the first time she had a Black doctor. "She had already seen two Black doctors in her life, but it was the first time she had been taken care of by one. I had the pleasure and honor to be this doctor, which represents a victory and ascension of Black people into positions of power, that had before been seen as only for white people", Fred mentioned.

=== Big Brother Brasil 23 ===
In January 2023 Nicácio was confirmed as a participant as part of the Celebrity team on the TV Globo program Big Brother Brasil 23. In the first elimination round of the season, he and Marília Miranda faced a vote for the Secret Room, winning the challenge with 69.26% of the vote against Gustavo Benedeti and Key Alves with 30.74%. As they won, they were able to participate in the challenge that would permit them access them control of the house. They remained for two days there and, in a new vote, one of them would be eliminated. The vote occurred, and Marília was eliminated with 52.70% of votes and Nicácio returned to the program.

On 18 January 2023, in a conversation with fellow contestant and nurse Cezar Black, Nicácio discussed a racist incident by a white nurse when he was administering a physical therapy activity: "I saw a doctor intubating someone and said 'I want to do that'. Afterwards, a white nurse said: 'Go away, boy, this is for doctors only'. Ok. Seven years after, love, I went back there, and she was my nurse. 'Yes, I'm here, I'm Doctor Fred Nicácio, what's up? Now I will intubate and you will help me'. We treat racists like that, exposing [them], because creating embarrassment is how you deal with them". The comments received criticism from the Regional Council of Nurses of São Paulo, which published a story on Instagram denouncing Nicácio: "Nursing is a regulated and autonomous profession that is not subordinate to anyone, since every health profession has attributions that are properly established."

On 20 January 2023, Nicácio was the victim of religious intolerance and racism by Cristian Vanelli, Gustavo Benedeti, and Key Alves. Cristian claimed that he had seen Nicácio, who practices Ifá, stopping in front of Gustavo and Key's bed "doing [Nicácio's] business" and that this scared them. In the conversation, Key said that she would leave the program if this were to happen again. That same night, they were shown images of Nicácio going to the Confessionary area to ask for medicine due to arm pain. Returning to his room, due to the lights being turned off, he tried to find his bed in small steps. Due to strong public backlash, the presenter of the show, Tadeu Schmidt, summoned all the participants to talk about their religious beliefs and gave Nicácio the opportunity to explain his own religious beliefs. Lawyer William David, from a branch of the criminal court system in Rio de Janeiro, opened a criminal case against the participants in Nicácio's name; However, the suit was dismissed by judge Marco José Mattos Couto, of the first regional criminal court in Jacarepaguá, alleging that David had not followed the necessary criminal case filing processes.

On 19 March 2023, BBB23 announced a new dynamic feature, the "Repechage Twist", which would reunite all the eliminated participants up to the ninth week (with the exception of Bruno Nogueira, who withdrew, and Antonio Carlos Júnior and MC Guimê, who were expelled) in a new space to achieve a redemption. Weeks before, Nicácio had been eliminated in the 7th round against Cara de Sapato and Cezar Black, with 62.94% of the votes. After a public vote, Nicácio and personal trainer Larissa Santos returned to the show, with 25.12% and 30.86% of the vote, respectively. On 11 April, Nicácio was voted out for the rest of the season with 51.14% of the vote, after being put to a vote with actress Bruna Griphao and psychologist Sarah Aline.

=== Awards ===
In 2023, Nicácio received the Medalha Pedro Ernesto after his participation on Big Brother Brasil. Councilwoman Thais Ferreira (PSOL) recognized him as an honorary citizen of the city of Rio de Janeiro for him confronting sensitive topics such as racism and religious intolerance on the show. According to Ferreira, the award is known for being "the greatest award conceded by the Municipal Chamber of Rio".

== Filmography ==
| Year | Show | Role | Channel | Notes |
|---|---|---|---|---|
| 2021 | Queer Eye Brasil | Presenter | Netflix | |
| 2023 | Big Brother Brasil 23 | Participant (9th place) | TV Globo | |

== Awards and nominations ==
| Year | Award | Category | Show | Result |
|---|---|---|---|---|
| 2023 | Prêmio Biscoito | Realiter do Vale | Big Brother Brasil 23 | Pending |
