= Dance Se Puder =

- Genre: Talent show
- Directed by: Ariel Jacobowitz
- Presented by: Eliana
- Judges: Jaime Arôxa; Ivan Santos; Li Martins
- Opening theme: Gonna Make You Sweat (Everybody Dance Now) by C+C Music Factory
- Ending theme: Gonna Make You Sweat (Everybody Dance Now) by C+C Music Factory
- Country of origin: Brazil
- Original language: Portuguese
- No. of seasons: 2

Production
- Camera setup: Multi-camera

Original release
- Network: SBT
- Release: March 27, 2016

Dance se Puder (Dance If You Can) is a talent show produced in Brazil and aired as a segment of the Sunday program "Eliana", on SBT network. During the competition, a number of young artists known to the public compete to find out who is the best dancer. It is hosted by Eliana. Each participant has to dance to a song chosen by the producers and they have a week to learn the choreography. On stage, they are judged by Jaime Arôxa, Ivan Santos and the new judge Li Martins. The winner will earn R$50,000.

== Judging ==
Judges of Dance se Puder
| Judge | Season | |
| Judge | 1 | 2 |
|---|---|---|
| Jaime Arôxa | Main | Main |
| Ivan Santos | Main | Main |
| Li Martins | | Main |

The panel of judges is formed by three people. During the first season, only Jaime Arôxa and Ivan Santos were regular judges, accompanied by a guest. In the second season, singer Li Martins joined the panel. Their function is to make criticism of the performances and give points on a scale of 0 to 10.

== Series overview ==
| Season | Premiere | Season Finale | (gold) Winner | (silver) 2nd Place | (bronze) 3rd Place | Other contestants (by order of eviction) | No. of contestants |
|---|---|---|---|---|---|---|---|
| 1 | March 27, 2016 | June 26, 2016 | Raissa Chaddad | Pedro Henrique | Gustavo Daneluz | Victória Diniz • Jean Paulo Campos • Ana Vitória Zimmermann • Amanda Furtado • Fernanda Concon • Thomaz Costa • Gabriel Santana | 10 |
| 2 | September 4, 2016 | October 23, 2016 | Kaik Pereira | Lorena Tucci | Cinthia Cruz | Lívia Diniz • Matheus Ueta • Léo Belmonte • Bianca Paiva • Júlia Olliver | 8 |
