= Big Brother Brasil 23 =

- Season 23
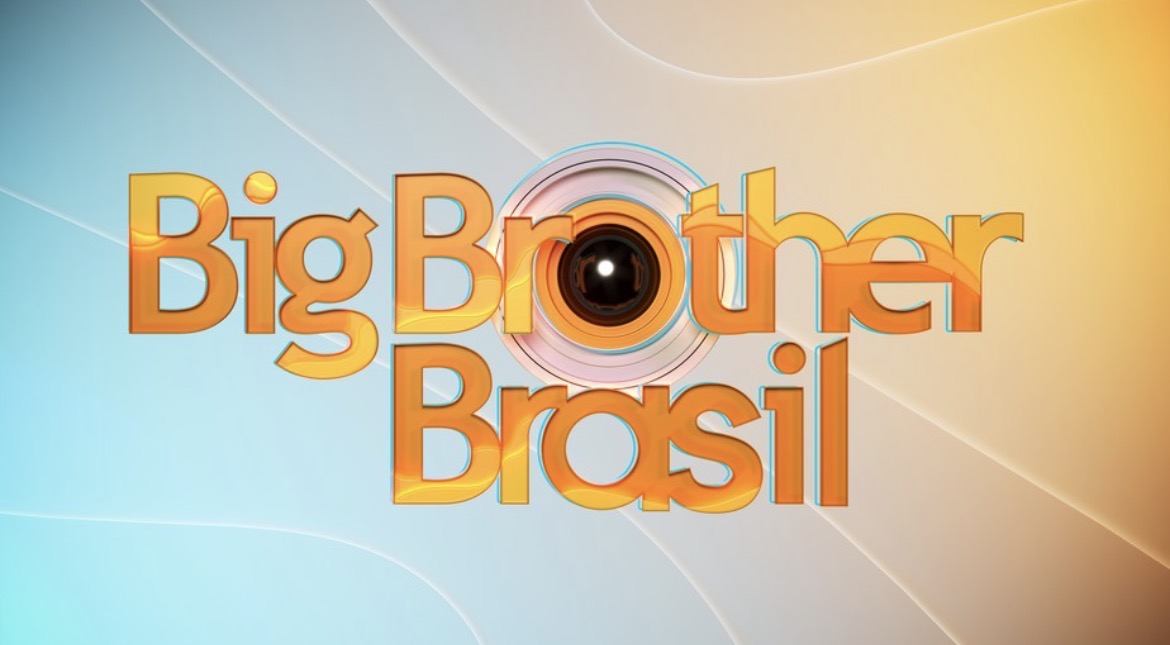
- Hosted by: Tadeu Schmidt
- No. of days: 100
- No. of housemates: 22
- Winner: Amanda Meirelles
- Runner-up: Aline Wirley
- Companion shows: Rede BBB; A Eliminação
- No. of episodes: 100

Release
- Original network: TV Globo; Multishow; Globoplay
- Original release: January 16 – April 25, 2023

Season chronology
- ← Previous; Big Brother Brasil 22 Next → Big Brother Brasil 24

Big Brother Brasil 23 was the twenty-third season of Big Brother Brasil, which premiered on TV Globo on January 16, 2023. The show was produced by Globo and hosted by Tadeu Schmidt, who returned for his second season as the host.

For the first and only time, the grand prize is R$ 2.88 million with tax allowances, plus a R$150,000 prize offered to the runner-up and a R$50,000 prize offered to the housemate in third place. For the fourth consecutive year, the show features housemates divided into two groups: "Celebrities", composed of actors, singers, professional athletes, and social media personalities, and "Civilians" composed of everyday Brazilians.

Before the premiere, four new potential housemates competed for two spots in the cast as part of a twist, with the winners being sequestered after the results and moving into the house with the rest of the cast on Day 1, bringing the total number of housemates up to 22.

On April 25, 2023, doctor Amanda Meirelles won the competition with 68.90% of the public vote over singer Aline Wirley and actress Bruna Griphao.

== The game ==
=== Final prize change throughout the season ===
After twelve years without adjustments to the maximum prize awarded to the winner of the reality show, the value of the final prize will be increased in this edition. Since Big Brother Brasil 10, that value was R$ 1.5 million, an amount that has sparked discussion in recent seasons due to the inflationary lag and the increasing success of previous alumni leading to future houseguests playing relatively risk-free games with a post-show career in mind, rather than winning the game itself.

This season was have the biggest prize in the history of the reality show. Surpassed by the following season. The value of the final award is undefined. This is because it may increase during the course of the season, according to the performance of the housemates.

Each week, on Tuesday elimination nights, three housemates will be chosen by random drawn to try to guess who will be evicted, with a cash value being added to the final prize for each correct answer.

| Week | | Sum of money | Cash bonus | Sum of right guess | Nominated | Selected housemate | Answer | Result | Remaining prize |
|---|---|---|---|---|---|---|---|---|---|
| 1 | | R$1.500.000 | R$50.000 | R$20.000 | Fred N. & Marília; Gustavo & Key | Aline | Fred N. & Marília | Correct | R$1.610.000 |
| 1 | | R$1.500.000 | R$50.000 | R$20.000 | Fred N. & Marília; Gustavo & Key | Cristian | Fred N. & Marília | Correct | R$1.610.000 |
| 1 | | R$1.500.000 | R$50.000 | R$20.000 | Fred N. & Marília; Gustavo & Key | Tina | Fred N. & Marília | Correct | R$1.610.000 |
| 2 | | R$1.610.000 | R$30.000 | R$30.000 | Cezar; Domitila; Gabriel T. | Marvvila | Gabriel T. | Correct | R$1.700.000 |
| 2 | | R$1.610.000 | R$30.000 | R$30.000 | Cezar; Domitila; Gabriel T. | Bruno | Domitila | Incorrect | R$1.700.000 |
| 2 | | R$1.610.000 | R$30.000 | R$30.000 | Cezar; Domitila; Gabriel T. | Fred C. | Gabriel T. | Correct | R$1.700.000 |
| 3 | | R$1.700.000 | R$30.000 | R$20.000 | Cezar; Gabriel S. Tina | Fred N. | Tina | Correct | R$1.750.000 |
| 3 | | R$1.700.000 | R$30.000 | R$20.000 | Cezar; Gabriel S. Tina | Fred C. | Cezar | Incorrect | R$1.750.000 |
| 3 | | R$1.700.000 | R$30.000 | R$20.000 | Cezar; Gabriel S. Tina | Aline | Gabriel S. | Incorrect | R$1.750.000 |
| 4 | | R$1.750.000 | R$30.000 | R$20.000 | Amanda; Bruno; Guimê; Paula | Cristian | Bruno | Incorrect | R$1.820.000 |
| 4 | | R$1.750.000 | R$30.000 | R$20.000 | Amanda; Bruno; Guimê; Paula | Antônio | Paula | Correct | R$1.820.000 |
| 4 | | R$1.750.000 | R$30.000 | R$20.000 | Amanda; Bruno; Guimê; Paula | Ricardo | Paula | Correct | R$1.820.000 |
| 5 | | R$1.820.000 | R$40.000 | R$10.000 | Cristian; Fred C. Ricardo | Fred N. | Cristian | Correct | R$1.890.000 |
| 5 | | R$1.820.000 | R$40.000 | R$10.000 | Cristian; Fred C. Ricardo | Domitila | Cristian | Correct | R$1.890.000 |
| 5 | | R$1.820.000 | R$40.000 | R$10.000 | Cristian; Fred C. Ricardo | Marvvila | Cristian | Correct | R$1.890.000 |
| 6 | Day 41 | R$1.890.000 | R$20.000 | R$10.000 | Domitila; Fred N. Gustavo | Sarah Aline | Fred N. | Incorrect | R$1.910.000 |
| 6 | Day 41 | R$1.890.000 | R$20.000 | R$10.000 | Domitila; Fred N. Gustavo | Antônio | Fred N. | Incorrect | R$1.910.000 |
| 6 | Day 41 | R$1.890.000 | R$20.000 | R$10.000 | Domitila; Fred N. Gustavo | Cezar | Domitila | Incorrect | R$1.910.000 |
| 6 | Day 44 | R$1.910.000 | R$40.000 | R$20.000 | Antônio; Cezar; Fred N. | Sarah Aline | Antônio | Incorrect | R$1.950.000 |
| 6 | Day 44 | R$1.910.000 | R$40.000 | R$20.000 | Antônio; Cezar; Fred N. | Domitila | Antônio | Incorrect | R$1.950.000 |
| 6 | Day 44 | R$1.910.000 | R$40.000 | R$20.000 | Antônio; Cezar; Fred N. | Fred C. | Cezar | Incorrect | R$1.950.000 |
| 7 | | R$1.950.000 | None | R$20.000 (Lost the R$20.000 for each incorrect answer) | Domitila; Key; Sarah Aline | Cezar | Sarah Aline | Incorrect | R$1.990.000 |
| 7 | | R$1.950.000 | None | R$20.000 (Lost the R$20.000 for each incorrect answer) | Domitila; Key; Sarah Aline | Amanda | Key | Correct | R$1.990.000 |
| 7 | | R$1.950.000 | None | R$20.000 (Lost the R$20.000 for each incorrect answer) | Domitila; Key; Sarah Aline | Larissa | Key | Correct | R$1.990.000 |
| 7 | | R$1.950.000 | None | R$20.000 (Lost the R$20.000 for each incorrect answer) | Domitila; Key; Sarah Aline | Guimê | Key | Correct | R$1.990.000 |
| 7 | | R$1.950.000 | None | R$20.000 (Lost the R$20.000 for each incorrect answer) | Domitila; Key; Sarah Aline | Gabriel S. | Domitila | Incorrect | R$1.990.000 |
| 7 | | R$1.950.000 | None | R$20.000 (Lost the R$20.000 for each incorrect answer) | Domitila; Key; Sarah Aline | Bruna | Key | Correct | R$1.990.000 |
| 8 | | R$1.990.000 | R$20.000 | R$20.000 (Won the R$80.000 in case of two or more correct answers) | Cezar; Domitila; Larissa; Ricardo | Aline | Ricardo | Incorrect | R$2.010.000 |
| 8 | | R$1.990.000 | R$20.000 | R$20.000 (Won the R$80.000 in case of two or more correct answers) | Cezar; Domitila; Larissa; Ricardo | Sarah Aline | Ricardo | Incorrect | R$2.010.000 |
| 8 | | R$1.990.000 | R$20.000 | R$20.000 (Won the R$80.000 in case of two or more correct answers) | Cezar; Domitila; Larissa; Ricardo | Gabriel S. | Ricardo | Incorrect | R$2.010.000 |
| 8 | | R$1.990.000 | R$20.000 | R$20.000 (Won the R$80.000 in case of two or more correct answers) | Cezar; Domitila; Larissa; Ricardo | Bruna | Ricardo | Incorrect | R$2.010.000 |
| 9 | | R$2.010.000 | None | R$40.000 (Won the R$20.000 for each incorrect answer) | Domitila; Fred C. Gabriel S. | Marvvila | Fred C. | Correct | R$2.130.000 |
| 9 | | R$2.010.000 | None | R$40.000 (Won the R$20.000 for each incorrect answer) | Domitila; Fred C. Gabriel S. | Bruna | Fred C. | Correct | R$2.130.000 |
| 9 | | R$2.010.000 | None | R$40.000 (Won the R$20.000 for each incorrect answer) | Domitila; Fred C. Gabriel S. | Cezar | Fred C. | Correct | R$2.130.000 |
| 10 | | R$2.130.000 | R$40.000 | R$60.000 | Aline; Bruna; Gabriel S. | Ricardo | Aline | Incorrect | R$2.170.000 |
| 10 | | R$2.130.000 | R$40.000 | R$60.000 | Aline; Bruna; Gabriel S. | Cezar | Aline | Incorrect | R$2.170.000 |
| 10 | | R$2.130.000 | R$40.000 | R$60.000 | Aline; Bruna; Gabriel S. | Marvvila | Aline | Incorrect | R$2.170.000 |
| 11 | | R$2.170.000 | R$20.000 | R$20.000 (Value doubles with each correct answer) | Amanda; Domitila; Larissa; Marvvila | Amanda | Domitila | Incorrect | R$2.190.000 |
| 11 | | R$2.170.000 | R$20.000 | R$20.000 (Value doubles with each correct answer) | Amanda; Domitila; Larissa; Marvvila | Domitila | Amanda | Incorrect | R$2.190.000 |
| 11 | | R$2.170.000 | R$20.000 | R$20.000 (Value doubles with each correct answer) | Amanda; Domitila; Larissa; Marvvila | Larissa | Domitila | Incorrect | R$2.190.000 |
| 11 | | R$2.170.000 | R$20.000 | R$20.000 (Value doubles with each correct answer) | Amanda; Domitila; Larissa; Marvvila | Marvvila | Amanda | Incorrect | R$2.190.000 |
| 12 | | R$2.190.000 | None | R$10.000 (Value is multiplied by the answer of each housemate) | Bruna; Fred N. Sarah Aline | Larissa | Fred N. | Correct | R$2.230.000 |
| 12 | | R$2.190.000 | None | R$10.000 (Value is multiplied by the answer of each housemate) | Bruna; Fred N. Sarah Aline | Larissa | Sarah Aline^{(x2)} | Incorrect | R$2.230.000 |
| 12 | | R$2.190.000 | None | R$10.000 (Value is multiplied by the answer of each housemate) | Bruna; Fred N. Sarah Aline | Amanda | Fred N.^{(x2)} | Correct | R$2.230.000 |
| 12 | | R$2.190.000 | None | R$10.000 (Value is multiplied by the answer of each housemate) | Bruna; Fred N. Sarah Aline | Amanda | Sarah Aline | Incorrect | R$2.230.000 |
| 12 | | R$2.190.000 | None | R$10.000 (Value is multiplied by the answer of each housemate) | Bruna; Fred N. Sarah Aline | Cezar | Fred N. | Correct | R$2.230.000 |
| 12 | | R$2.190.000 | None | R$10.000 (Value is multiplied by the answer of each housemate) | Bruna; Fred N. Sarah Aline | Cezar | Sarah Aline^{(x2)} | Incorrect | R$2.230.000 |
| 13 | Day 88 | R$2.230.000 | None | R$20.000 (Value is multiplied by the answer of each housemate) | Aline; Amanda; Cezar | Bruna | Cezar^{(x3)} | Correct | R$2.390.000 |
| 13 | Day 88 | R$2.230.000 | None | R$20.000 (Value is multiplied by the answer of each housemate) | Aline; Amanda; Cezar | Larissa | Cezar^{(x3)} | Correct | R$2.390.000 |
| 13 | Day 88 | R$2.230.000 | None | R$20.000 (Value is multiplied by the answer of each housemate) | Aline; Amanda; Cezar | Ricardo | Amanda | Incorrect | R$2.390.000 |
| 13 | Day 88 | R$2.230.000 | None | R$20.000 (Value is multiplied by the answer of each housemate) | Aline; Amanda; Cezar | Ricardo | Cezar^{(x2)} | Correct | R$2.390.000 |
| 13 | Day 91 | R$2.390.000 | R$40.000 | R$20.000 (Value is multiplied by the answer of each housemate) | Aline; Bruna; Sarah Aline | Larissa | Aline | Incorrect | R$2.510.000 |
| 13 | Day 91 | R$2.390.000 | R$40.000 | R$20.000 (Value is multiplied by the answer of each housemate) | Aline; Bruna; Sarah Aline | Larissa | Sarah Aline^{(x2)} | Correct | R$2.510.000 |
| 13 | Day 91 | R$2.390.000 | R$40.000 | R$20.000 (Value is multiplied by the answer of each housemate) | Aline; Bruna; Sarah Aline | Amanda | Bruna | Incorrect | R$2.510.000 |
| 13 | Day 91 | R$2.390.000 | R$40.000 | R$20.000 (Value is multiplied by the answer of each housemate) | Aline; Bruna; Sarah Aline | Amanda | Sarah Aline^{(x2)} | Correct | R$2.510.000 |
| 13 | Day 91 | R$2.390.000 | R$40.000 | R$20.000 (Value is multiplied by the answer of each housemate) | Aline; Bruna; Sarah Aline | Ricardo | Aline^{(x2)} | Incorrect | R$2.510.000 |
| 13 | Day 91 | R$2.390.000 | R$40.000 | R$20.000 (Value is multiplied by the answer of each housemate) | Aline; Bruna; Sarah Aline | Ricardo | Bruna | Incorrect | R$2.510.000 |
| 13 | Day 93 | R$2.510.000 | R$50.000 | R$10.000 (Value is multiplied by the answer of each housemate) | Amanda; Domitila; Larissa | Aline | Amanda | Incorrect | R$2.580.000 |
| 13 | Day 93 | R$2.510.000 | R$50.000 | R$10.000 (Value is multiplied by the answer of each housemate) | Amanda; Domitila; Larissa | Aline | Domitila | Correct | R$2.580.000 |
| 13 | Day 93 | R$2.510.000 | R$50.000 | R$10.000 (Value is multiplied by the answer of each housemate) | Amanda; Domitila; Larissa | Aline | Larissa | Incorrect | R$2.580.000 |
| 13 | Day 93 | R$2.510.000 | R$50.000 | R$10.000 (Value is multiplied by the answer of each housemate) | Amanda; Domitila; Larissa | Bruna | Amanda | Incorrect | R$2.580.000 |
| 13 | Day 93 | R$2.510.000 | R$50.000 | R$10.000 (Value is multiplied by the answer of each housemate) | Amanda; Domitila; Larissa | Bruna | Domitila | Correct | R$2.580.000 |
| 13 | Day 93 | R$2.510.000 | R$50.000 | R$10.000 (Value is multiplied by the answer of each housemate) | Amanda; Domitila; Larissa | Bruna | Larissa | Incorrect | R$2.580.000 |
| 13 | Day 93 | R$2.510.000 | R$50.000 | R$10.000 (Value is multiplied by the answer of each housemate) | Amanda; Domitila; Larissa | Ricardo | Amanda^{(x2)} | Incorrect | R$2.580.000 |
| 13 | Day 93 | R$2.510.000 | R$50.000 | R$10.000 (Value is multiplied by the answer of each housemate) | Amanda; Domitila; Larissa | Ricardo | Larissa | Incorrect | R$2.580.000 |
| 14 | Day 95 | R$2.580.000 | R$100.000 | R$20.000 (Value is multiplied by the answer of each housemate) | Larissa; Ricardo | Aline | Ricardo^{(x3)} | Correct | R$2.820.000 |
| 14 | Day 95 | R$2.580.000 | R$100.000 | R$20.000 (Value is multiplied by the answer of each housemate) | Larissa; Ricardo | Amanda | Larissa | Incorrect | R$2.820.000 |
| 14 | Day 95 | R$2.580.000 | R$100.000 | R$20.000 (Value is multiplied by the answer of each housemate) | Larissa; Ricardo | Amanda | Ricardo^{(x2)} | Correct | R$2.820.000 |
| 14 | Day 95 | R$2.580.000 | R$100.000 | R$20.000 (Value is multiplied by the answer of each housemate) | Larissa; Ricardo | Bruna | Larissa | Incorrect | R$2.820.000 |
| 14 | Day 95 | R$2.580.000 | R$100.000 | R$20.000 (Value is multiplied by the answer of each housemate) | Larissa; Ricardo | Bruna | Ricardo^{(x2)} | Correct | R$2.820.000 |
| 14 | Day 98 | R$2.820.000 | R$30.000 | R$30.000 (Value is multiplied by the answer of each housemate) | Aline; Bruna; Larissa | Amanda | Aline | Incorrect | R$2.880.000 |
| 14 | Day 98 | R$2.820.000 | R$30.000 | R$30.000 (Value is multiplied by the answer of each housemate) | Aline; Bruna; Larissa | Amanda | Bruna | Incorrect | R$2.880.000 |
| 14 | Day 98 | R$2.820.000 | R$30.000 | R$30.000 (Value is multiplied by the answer of each housemate) | Aline; Bruna; Larissa | Amanda | Larissa | Correct | R$2.880.000 |
| Finale | | Jackpot | | | | | | | R$2.880.000 |

=== Super HoH ===
Along with its regular powers, the HoH would also be tasked with splitting their housemates into Haves and Have-Nots as well as choosing what and how much each group would be eating.

Starting this season, the HoH will have access to a "Control Center" from their room, with commands that offer a view of the game in a limited and predetermined way.

The HoH will also be able to watch what happens in the rest of the House with audio, find out the total number of votes they received so far; and the ability to wake up housemates at any time they want.

Roles have limited access, but make the HoH post even more valuable and strategic in the game.

=== Withdrawal Button ===
Since season twenty-two, there has been an opt-out button. Thus, the housemate who wants to give up the game can just press the button, without having to resort to the Diary Room or the production of the program and leave the program immediately.

The item will be visible to all housemates, in the room of the house. However, the button will be protected in an illuminated box, closed by a hatch, and can only be activated when indicated by the green light. The button will work at certain times, being unavailable and with red light during parties, from 9 pm to 9 am, to prevent housemates from pressing it while intoxicated.

=== #FeedBBB ===
The theme of the reality show is such that each housemate will use a cellphone to capture moments in the house during a time determined by the production. The cell phone only allows them to post photos and videos to #FeedBBB, and see what other housemates say about each other. It does not allow contact with the outside world.

Since the season twenty-one, #FeedBBB introduced "Arrow", an app akin to Tinder, which housemates used to pick out their love interests in the house. The "HoH Podcast" is recorded weekly and published on the GShow website. The housemates can see when it is being recorded but do not hear the content.

In addition to the novelty called "Anonymous Torpedo" has been added to the platform since the twenty-second season, which can further influence the house's relationships. The function allows housemates to send anonymous messages, with no declared author, to other confined people, which are published on the screen in the room for everyone to see.

=== Selective Collection ===
The season, the housemates will be rewarded according their waste management in order to promote sustainability. Each week, they will earn Estalecas (Z$) – the House currency – from their selective collection based on a ranking established by production alongside TV Globo's Environmental Management area.

=== Evicted's Message ===
For the first time in the show's history, the evicted housemate can leave a video message for someone still in the running.

The video will be addressed and displayed on the home screen, in front of all those inside the House. The evicted housemates will be able to leave an advice, warning, or even doubtful information in order to harm a confined person, according to their personal strategies.

=== Glass House ===
On January 10, 2023, four additional housemates entered the Glass house where the public voted for two of them (one man and one woman) to move into the main House.

Twist introduced in Big Brother Brasil 9, re-used in Big Brother Brasil 11 (featuring the first five evicted housemates from that season), Big Brother Brasil 13, Big Brother Brasil 20 and Big Brother Brasil 22.

=== Duos Twist ===
During Week 1, the 22 housemates were split into duos where they would compete in competitions and could also be nominated together. The duos were chosen by a public vote held a couple days before the premiere, in which each Civilian was paired with a Celebrity, with the exception of the two Glass House contestants selected by the public to enter.

Housemates entered the House on Day 1 handcuffed to their duo partners and stayed that way up until Night 3.

Duos Results
| Nominated Civilian | | Chosen Celebrity |
|---|---|---|
| Amanda | | Antônio |
| Bruno | | Aline |
| Cezar | | Domitila |
| Cristian | | Marvvila |
| Gustavo | | Key |
| Larissa | | Bruna |
| Marília | | Fred N. |
| Ricardo | | Fred C. |
| Sarah Aline | | Gabriel S. |
| Tina | | Guimê |
| Gabriel T. | Paula | —N/a |

=== Secret Room ===
The duos split up on Day 9 after the reveal of the first public vote. Has been informed that the chosen duo would move to a Secret Room where there would be a second vote to determine which housemate from the duo would be officially evicted as an individual on Day 11.

=== Higher Power ===
The housemate who answered the Big Phone on Day 39, won the "Higher Power", it could overthrow the Head of Household, the House votes, the Big Phone or the Counterattack and replace the nominations. This power could only be used once and within the next eviction.

The twist was based on "Coup d'État" format used US Big Brother, and was used two times before during the 10th season, and re-used in 12nd season.

=== White Room ===
On Day 52, two housemates (Domitila and Fred Carneiro) were chosen to enter the White Room, where they would stay until the live HoH competition on Day 53, competing in an endurance competition, that would determine the first nominee of the week. The winner would immediately return to the house with immunity and win a car, while the loser would be automatically nominated, without be eligible to compete for the veto.

A re-worked version of a twist introduced in Big Brother Brasil 9, re-used in Big Brother Brasil 10 and Big Brother Brasil 20.

=== Housemate Exchange ===
On March 13, 2023, a housemate exchange with La Casa de los Famosos was announced. Evicted contestant Key Alves swapped with Dania Méndez from La Casa de los Famosos 3 on Day 59, swap which was originally meant to last a week on both ends. The twist was prematurely interrupted due to a controversy in the BBB house with Dania, where two houseguests were ejected from the game following inappropriate behavior with her.

However, Dania was still in contention for the La Casa de los Famosos prize, while Key had already been evicted from Big Brother Brasil. The choice to make the exchange for a housemate who had already been evicted was made due to the rules of the Brazilian's reality show not to bring outside information into the house.

=== Repechage Twist ===
On Week 9, following the double ejection of Antônio and Guimê due to inappropriate behavior with international guest Dania Mendez, it was revealed to the public that two eliminated houseguests would have the chance to return to the game in a repechage action.

The first 9 evicted houseguests - with the exception of Antônio and Guilherme, who were ejected, and Bruno, who chose to walk from the game - joined by the person evicted on Week 9, would be confined into a house for two days, where the public would vote to send two of them back into the game. The two houseguests chosen to return to the game would not be allowed to compete in the next scheduled Head of Household or Power of Immunity competitions.

=== Vote to Save ===
On Week 11, the voting system worked the opposite way, with the public voting for save among the nominees as opposed to voting to evict like normal.

The nominee with the lowest vote total from the public vote was evicted.

=== Power of Veto ===
In some weeks, the nominated housemates compete against each other for one last chance to save themselves from eviction. The housemates nominated by the HoH are not eligible to compete and are guaranteed to face Brazil's vote.

=== Joker Power ===
Each week, before the house groceries purchases, an advantage or twist of some kind will be offered to all housemates, who can then bid for it in the Diary Room using their in-game currencies, if they wish so. The results will then be displayed to the whole House, with the housemate who entered the Diary Room and bid for the advantage first being the winner, in the event of a tie. The housemates are allowed to share, omit or lie regarding any details related to the bid.

| Week | Power | Bidders | Winner | Description |
|---|---|---|---|---|
| 1 | Double Vote | Tina (679); Cezar (500); Domitila (450); Key (300); Gabriel S. (1) | Tina | The vote of the winner of this power would be counted as two in the first nomination ceremony. As Week 1 was played in duos, this power was also won by the winner's duo by default. |
| 2 | Power of Veto at a House Vote Nomination | Antônio (1340); Guimê (1330); Ricardo (930); Sarah Aline (820); Fred N. (260) | Antônio | The winner of this power would be able to save one of the two housemates nominated by the house vote, with the third highest vote getter becoming the replacement nominee. |
| 3 | Power of Veto at a Big Phone Nomination | Paula (1800); Key (1710); Gabriel S. (1335) | Paula | The winner of this power would be able to save one of the two housemates nominated through the Big Phone. They were initially told that they would have the power to make a choice, only being informed of the true nature of the power on Sunday's nominations. In addition, the holder of this power would also be immune to the Counterattack of the person they decided to keep on the block. |
| 4 | Superpower of Nomination | Key (2300); Cristian (2200); Amanda (2080) | Key | Much like a Head of Household nomination, the winner of this power would be allowed to directly nominate a houseguest for eviction, denying them the right to play for the veto. |
| 5 | Power of Ban | Cristian (2330); Fred N. (2130); Amanda (1500) | Cristian | During Sunday's nominations, the winner of this power would be able to ban one housemate from casting a vote. |
| 7 | Path Power | Sarah Aline (1280); Ricardo (1270); Aline (1260); Gabriel S. (1200) | Sarah Aline | During Sunday's nominations, the winner of this power would be able to choose which one of the voting groups they want to be part of, while also being the first person in that group to cast a vote. |
| 8 | Power of Choice to a Counterattack | Aline (1970); Ricardo (1800) | Aline | Following the house voting on Sunday, the winner of this power would have to choose which one of the two house nominees would have a Counterattack. |
| 9 | Suitcase Power | Ricardo (1830); Amanda (1000); Fred C. (512) | Ricardo | This power was not actually used by the houseguest who successfully bid for it, instead being assigned to international guest Dania Méndez. On Sunday, during live nominations, it was revealed to Ricardo that Dania had the choice between nullifying his vote or making it count as two, with the former being chosen. |
| 10 | Power of Nomination | Amanda (1590); Gabriel S. (1325); Fred N. (500) | Amanda | During live nominations on Sunday, the winner of this power would have to nominate for eviction one of the housemate that received the fewest votes, meaning that anyone that hadn't received a vote was eligible for this nomination. |
| 11 | Immunity | Sarah Aline (1600); Amanda (800) | Sarah Aline | The winner of this power would receive immunity for the week. They would only be told of this fact on Sunday, during nominations. |
| 12 | Mixing Power | Aline (2210); Domitila (1900) | Aline | Following the house voting on Sunday, the winner of this power would have to exchange one of the two nominees by the Power of Immunity holder for another housemate. |

=== Power of No ===
At the beginning of each week, the previous Head of Household may or may not be given the opportunity to disqualify some housemates from competing in the upcoming HoH competition. Houseguests might also be vetoed from competing in HoH by punishments from other competitions or twists.

| Week | | Previous HoH(s) | Total | Vetoed housemates |
|---|---|---|---|---|
| 1 | | Immunity Competition | 2 | Cristian & Marvvila, Guimê & Tina |
| 2 | | Bruna | 2 | Domitila, Gabriel S. |
| 2 | | Larissa | 2 | Cezar, Cristian |
| 2 | | Fred N. | 1 | Gabriel T. |
| 4 | | Gustavo | 1 | Ricardo |
| 4 | | Cezar | 1 | Antônio |
| 4 | | Gabriel S. | 1 | Guimê |
| 6 | Day 39 | HoH Competition | 3 | Gabriel S., Gustavo, Key |
| 6 | Day 42 | Sarah Aline | 1 | Antônio |
| 7 | | HoH Competition | 1 | Cezar |
| 7 | | Guimê | 1 | Key |
| 7 | | Bruna | 1 | Domitila |
| 8 | | White Room | 2 | Domitila, Fred C |
| 8 | | Fred C. | 1 | Cezar |
| 9 | | HoH Competition | 2 | Aline, Sarah Aline |
| 10 | | Comeback House | 2 | Fred N., Larissa |
| 10 | | Bruna | 1 | Domitila |
| 12 | | Aline | 1 | Fred N. |

=== Big Phone ===
Once in a while, the Big Phone rings, unleashing good or bad consequences on the nomination process for those who decide to answer it.

| Week | Housemate | Date | Time (BRT) | Consequences |
|---|---|---|---|---|
| 3 | Tina | February 4, 2023 | Saturday; 10:53 p.m. | See note 12 |
| 4 | Gustavo | February 9, 2023 | Thursday; 11:45 a.m. | See note 15 |
| 6 | Guimê | February 23, 2023 | Thursday; 6:30 p.m. | See note 24 |
| 6 | Sarah Aline | February 25, 2023 | Saturday; 11:00 p.m. | See note 26 |
| 7 | Guimê | March 1, 2023 | Wednesday; 6:00 p.m. | See note 30 |
| 7 | Cezar | March 4, 2023 | Saturday; 11:00 p.m. | See note 30 |

=== The Counterattack ===
Introduced at the 20th season, the counterattack action is a surprise power given to either the HoH's nominee and/or the House's nominee, in which they have the opportunity to automatically nominate an additional housemate for eviction. While viewers are informed when the power will be featured in advance (on Thursdays before the Head of Household competition even takes place), the housemates are only informed about the twist on the spot, during Sunday's live nominations.

| Week | | Housemate | Status | Used on: | Result |
|---|---|---|---|---|---|
| 1 | | Fred N. & Marília | House's nominees | Gabriel T. & Paula | See note 5 |
| 2 | | Cezar | HoH's nominee | Gabriel T. | See note 9 |
| 3 | | Gabriel S. | Big Phone's nominee | Amanda | See note 14 |
| 5 | | Fred C. | HoH competition's nominee | Domitila | See note 22 |
| 6 | Day 39 | Antônio | HoH's nominee | Fred N. | See note 23 |
| 7 | | Cezar | Big Phone's nominee saved | Guimê | See note 34 |
| 8 | | Larissa | House's nominee (chosen by Joker Power holder) | Ricardo | See note 40 |
| 10 | | Gabriel S. | Joker Power's nominee | Aline | See note 47 |
| 12 | | Amanda | Power of Immunity's nominee | Sarah Aline | See note 56 |
| 13 | Day 89 | Aline | HoH's nominee | Sarah Aline | See note 59 |
| 13 | Day 91 | Domitila | House's nominee | Larissa | See note 60 |

== Housemates ==
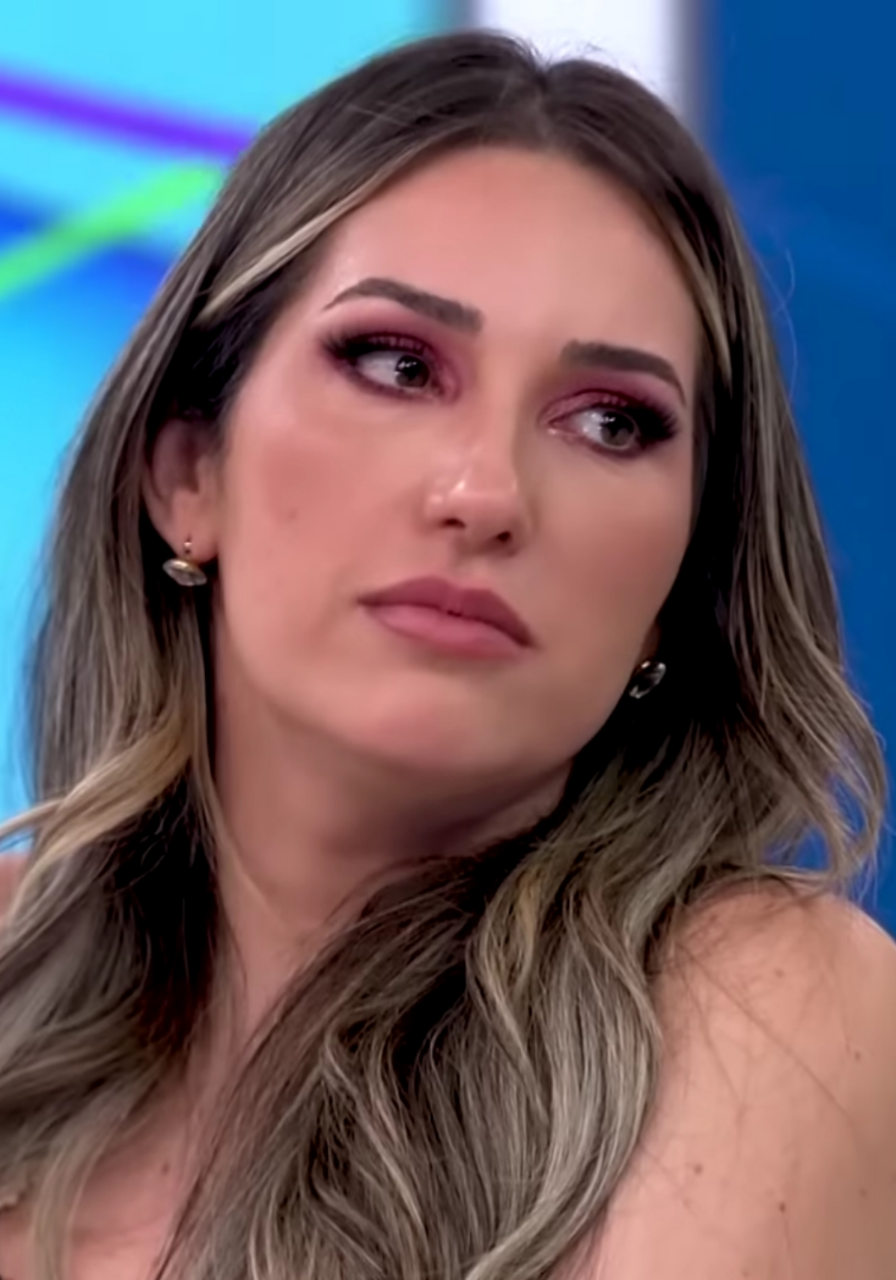
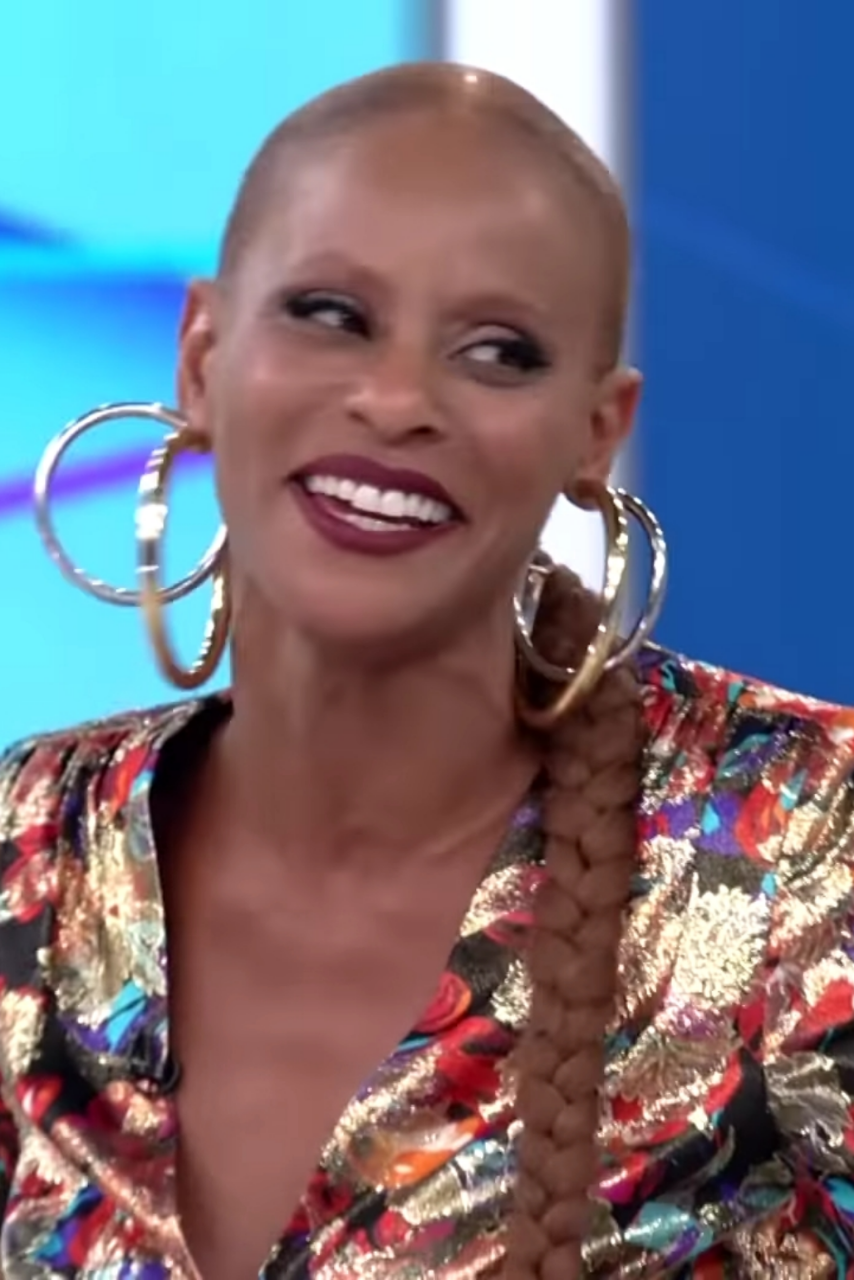
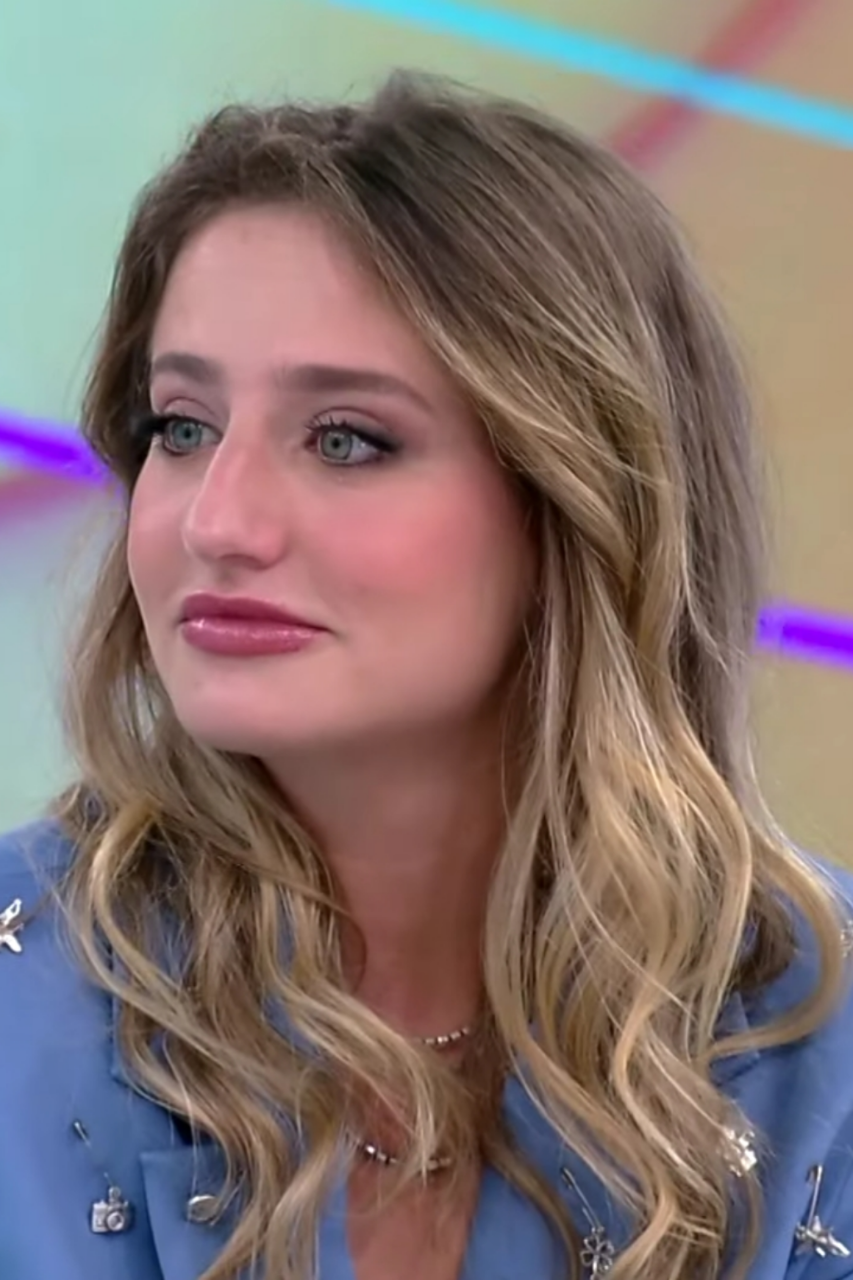
Amanda Meirelles (Winner), Aline Wirley (Runner-up) and Bruna Griphao (Third place), the finalists of Big Brother Brasil 23.

The cast list was unveiled on January 12, 2023.

| Name | Age | Type | Hometown | Occupation | Day entered | Day exited | Result |
|---|---|---|---|---|---|---|---|
| Amanda Meirelles | 31 | Civilian | Astorga | Doctor | 1 | 100 | Winner |
| Aline Wirley | 41 | Celebrity | Cachoeira Paulista | Singer | 1 | 100 | Runner-up |
| Bruna Griphao | 23 | Celebrity | Rio de Janeiro | Actress | 1 | 100 | Third place |
| Larissa Santos | 24 | Civilian | Sombrio | Physical education teacher | 67 | 98 | 18th Evicted |
| Larissa Santos | 24 | Civilian | Sombrio | Physical education teacher | 1 | 58 | 9th Evicted |
| Ricardo Camargo | 30 | Civilian | Aracaju | Biomedical | 1 | 95 | 17th Evicted |
| Domitila Barros | 38 | Celebrity | Recife | Model & social activist | 1 | 93 | 16th Evicted |
| Sarah Aline Rodrigues | 25 | Civilian | Osasco | Psychologist & diversity analyst | 1 | 91 | 15th Evicted |
| Cezar Black | 34 | Civilian | Salvador | Nurse | 1 | 88 | 14th Evicted |
| Fred Nicácio | 35 | Celebrity | Campos dos Goytacazes | Doctor & physiotherapist | 67 | 86 | 13th Evicted |
| Fred Nicácio | 35 | Celebrity | Campos dos Goytacazes | Doctor & physiotherapist | 1 | 44 | 7th Evicted |
| Kassia Marvvila | 23 | Celebrity | Rio de Janeiro | Singer | 1 | 79 | 12th Evicted |
| Gabriel Santana | 23 | Celebrity | Rio de Janeiro | Actor | 1 | 72 | 11th Evicted |
| Fred Carneiro | 33 | Celebrity | São Paulo | Journalist & digital influencer | 1 | 65 | 10th Evicted |
| Antônio Cara de Sapato | 32 | Celebrity | João Pessoa | MMA fighter | 1 | 60 | Ejected |
| MC Guimê | 30 | Celebrity | Osasco | Singer-songwriter | 1 | 60 | Ejected |
| Key Alves | 23 | Celebrity | Bauru | Volleyball player | 1 | 51 | 8th Evicted |
| Gustavo Benedetti | 27 | Civilian | Sinop | Farmer & businessman | 1 | 41 | 6th Evicted |
| Cristian Vanelli | 32 | Civilian | Caxias do Sul | Businessman | 1 | 37 | 5th Evicted |
| Bruno Nogueira | 32 | Civilian | São José da Laje | Pharmacy attendant | 1 | 33 | Walked |
| Paula Freitas | 28 | Civilian | Jacundá | Biomedical | 1 | 30 | 4th Evicted |
| Tina Calamba | 29 | Civilian | Benguela, Angola | Marketing analyst & model | 1 | 23 | 3rd Evicted |
| Gabriel Tavares | 24 | Civilian | Ribeirão Preto | Administrator & model | 1 | 16 | 2nd Evicted |
| Marília Miranda | 32 | Civilian | Natal | Make up artist & digital influencer | 1 | 11 | 1st Evicted |
Glass House
| Gabriel Tavares | 24 | Civilian | Ribeirão Preto | Administrator & model | 0 | 1 | Selected |
| Manoel Vicente | 32 | Civilian | Cuiabá | Psychiatrist | 0 | 1 | Not Selected |
| Giovanna Leão | 25 | Civilian | Campinas | Businesswoman | 0 | 1 | Not Selected |
| Paula Freitas | 28 | Civilian | Jacundá | Biomedical | 0 | 1 | Selected |
Guest
| Name | Age | Type | Hometown | Occupation | Day entered | Day exited | La Casa de los Famosos |
| Dania Méndez | 31 | Celebrity | Guadalajara, Mexico | Influencer | 59 | 61 | Evicted – 8th place |

== Future appearances ==
In 2023, Cezar Black appeared in A Fazenda 15, he entered in the Warehouse where the public voted for four contestants to move into the main house, he received enough votes to enter in the game and finished in 9th place in the competition.

== Voting history ==
Key
– Civilians
– Celebrities
– Glass House Civilians

| | Pre-Game | Duos Phase | Individual Phase | | | | | | | | | | | | | | | | | | | |
| | Week 0 | Week 1 | | Week 2 | Week 3 | Week 4 | Week 5 | Week 6 | | Week 7 | Week 8 | Week 9 | Week 10 | | Week 11 | Week 12 | Week 13 | | | Week 14 | | |
| | Week 0 | Day 7 | Day 9 | Week 2 | Week 3 | Week 4 | Week 5 | Day 39 | Day 42 | Week 7 | Week 8 | Week 9 | Wildcard | Day 70 | Week 11 | Week 12 | Day 86 | Day 89 | Day 91 | Day 93 | Day 96 | Finale |
|---|---|---|---|---|---|---|---|---|---|---|---|---|---|---|---|---|---|---|---|---|---|---|
| Head of Household | (none) | Bruna; Larissa | (none) | Antônio | Gustavo | Gustavo | Cezar | Sarah Aline | Bruna | Fred C. | Guimê | Bruna | (none) | Sarah Aline | Aline | Ricardo | Sarah Aline | Domitila | Ricardo | Bruna | (none) | (none) |
| Power of Immunity | (none) | Aline; Bruno | (none) | Ricardo | Cristian | Amanda | Ricardo | (none) | Guimê | Guimê | Cezar; Larissa | Gabriel S. | (none) | Ricardo | Amanda; Larissa | Cezar | (none) | Sarah Aline | (none) | (none) | (none) | (none) |
| Saved | (none) | Amanda; Antônio | (none) | Tina | Key | Aline | Guimê | (none) | Guimê | Bruna | Aline | Sarah Aline | (none) | Ricardo | Bruna | Cezar | (none) | Ricardo | (none) | (none) | (none) | (none) |
| Joker Power | (none) | Guimê; Tina | (none) | Antônio | Paula | Key | Cristian | (none) | (none) | Sarah Aline | Aline | Ricardo | (none) | Amanda | Sarah Aline | Aline | (none) | (none) | (none) | (none) | (none) | (none) |
| Nomination (Twists) | (none) | Gabriel T. Paula | (none) | Gabriel T. | Amanda; ~~Domitila~~; Gabriel S. | Bruno; ~~Gustavo~~; Paula | Domitila; Fred C. | Fred N. | Antônio; Key | ~~Cezar~~; Guimê; Key | Domitila; Ricardo | Marvvila | (none) | Aline; Gabriel S. | Cezar; Marvvila | ~~Aline~~; Amanda; Sarah Aline | (none) | Sarah Aline | Larissa | (none) | Aline; Bruna; Larissa | (none) |
| Nomination (HoH) | (none) | Gustavo; Key | (none) | Cezar | Tina | Guimê | Ricardo | ~~Antônio~~; Gustavo | Fred N. | Sarah Aline | Cezar | Domitila | (none) | Bruna | Domitila | Fred N. | Amanda | Aline | Amanda | Ricardo | (none) | (none) |
| Nomination (Housemates) | (none) | Fred N. Marília | (none) | Cristian; Domitila; ~~Guimê~~ | Cezar | Amanda; Fred N. | Cristian | Amanda | Cezar | Amanda; Domitila | Larissa; Marvvila | Fred C. Gabriel S. | (none) | Amanda | Amanda; Larissa | Bruna | Aline; Cezar | Bruna | Domitila | Larissa | (none) | (none) |
| Veto Players | (none) | Fred N. & Marília; Gabriel T. & Paula | (none) | Cristian; Domitila; Gabriel T. | Amanda; Cezar; Gabriel S. | Amanda; Bruno; Fred N. | Cristian; Domitila; Fred C. | (none) | Antônio; Cezar; Key | Amanda; Domitila; Guimê; Key | Larissa; Marvvila; Ricardo | Fred C. Gabriel S. Marvvila | (none) | Aline; Amanda; Gabriel S. | Amanda; Cezar; Larissa; Marvvila | Amanda; Bruna; Sarah Aline | (none) | | | | (none) | (none) |
| Veto Winner(s) | (none) | Gabriel T. Paula | (none) | Cristian | Amanda | Fred N. | Domitila | (none) | Key | Domitila; Guimê | Marvvila | Marvvila | (none) | Amanda | Cezar | Amanda | (none) | | | | (none) | (none) |
| Amanda | Not in House | Fred N. Marília | Not eligible | Domitila | Cezar | Fred N. | Fred N. | Domitila | Cezar | Marvvila | Gabriel S. | Gabriel S. | Not eligible | Not eligible | Marvvila; Cezar | Sarah Aline | Cezar | Sarah Aline | Domitila | Larissa | Exempt | Winner (Day 100) |
| Aline | Not in House | Fred N. Marília | Not eligible | Domitila | Cezar | Fred N. | Cristian | Domitila | Cezar | Domitila | Gabriel S. | Gabriel S. | Not eligible | Marvvila | Head of Household | Sarah Aline | Cezar | Sarah Aline | Domitila | Larissa | Nominated | Runner-up (Day 100) |
| Bruna | Not in House | Co-Head of Household | Not eligible | Domitila | Cezar | Fred N. | Fred N. | Domitila | Cezar | Domitila | Marvvila | Head of Household | Not eligible | Marvvila | Marvvila; Cezar | Sarah Aline | Cezar | Sarah Aline | Domitila | Head of Household | Nominated | Third place (Day 100) |
| Larissa | Not in House | Co-Head of Household | Not eligible | Cristian | Cezar | Fred N. | Cristian | Domitila | Cezar | Cezar | Sarah Aline | Evicted (Day 58) | Comeback; House | Marvvila | Marvvila; Cezar | Sarah Aline | Cezar | Sarah Aline | Domitila | Aline | Nominated | Re-Evicted (Day 98) |
| Ricardo | Not in House | Fred N. Marília | Not eligible | Domitila | Fred N. | Fred N. | Cristian | Cezar | Cezar | Domitila | Marvvila | ~~Fred C.~~ | Not eligible | Amanda | Cezar; Amanda | Bruna | Cezar | Bruna | Head of Household | Larissa | Evicted (Day 95) | |
| Domitila | Not in House | Gabriel T. Paula | Not eligible | ~~Guimê~~ | Amanda | Cristian | Cristian | Amanda | Amanda | Guimê | Larissa | Fred C. | Not eligible | Amanda | Amanda; Larissa | Bruna | Aline | Bruna | Larissa | Evicted (Day 93) | | |
| Sarah Aline | Not in House | Gabriel T. Paula | Not eligible | ~~Guimê~~ | Amanda | Cristian | Cristian | Head of Household | Amanda | Larissa | Larissa | Fred C. | Not eligible | Head of Household | Amanda; Larissa | Bruna | Head of Household | Bruna | Evicted (Day 91) | | | |
| Cezar | Not in House | Gabriel T. Paula | Not eligible | ~~Guimê~~ | Amanda | Amanda | Head of Household | Amanda | Amanda | Amanda | Larissa | Fred C. | Not eligible | Aline | Larissa; Ricardo | Bruna | Aline | Evicted (Day 88) | | | | |
| Fred N. | Not in House | Gabriel T. Paula | Nominated | ~~Guimê~~ | Amanda | Amanda | Not eligible | Amanda | Amanda | Evicted (Day 44) | | | Comeback; House | Amanda | Amanda; Larissa | Bruna | Re-Evicted (Day 86) | | | | | |
| Marvvila | Not in House | Gabriel T. Paula | Not eligible | ~~Guimê~~ | Amanda | Amanda | Cristian | Amanda | Amanda | Amanda | Larissa | Amanda | Not eligible | Amanda | Amanda; Larissa | Evicted (Day 79) | | | | | | |
| Gabriel S. | Not in House | Gabriel T. Paula | Not eligible | ~~Guimê~~ | Amanda | Amanda | Cristian | Amanda | Amanda | Amanda | Amanda | Amanda | Not eligible | Amanda | Evicted (Day 72) | | | | | | | |
| Fred C. | Not in House | Fred N. Marília | Not eligible | Cristian | Cezar | Fred N. | Cristian | Domitila | Cezar | Head of Household | Sarah Aline | Gabriel S. | Comeback; House | Evicted (Day 65) | | | | | | | | |
| Antônio | Not in House | Fred N. Marília | Not eligible | Head of Household | Fred N. | Fred N. | Not eligible | Cezar | Cezar | Marvvila | Marvvila | Ejected (Day 60) | | | | | | | | | | |
| Guimê | Not in House | Fred N. Marília^{(x2)} | Not eligible | Domitila | Cezar | Fred N. | Fred N. | Gustavo | Cezar | Domitila | Head of Household | Ejected (Day 60) | | | | | | | | | | |
| Key | Not in House | Gabriel T. Paula | Not eligible | ~~Guimê~~ | Larissa | Amanda | Cristian | Amanda | Amanda | Guimê | Evicted (Day 51) | | Comeback; House | Evicted (Day 51) | | | | | | | | |
| Gustavo | Not in House | Gabriel T. Paula | Not eligible | ~~Guimê~~ | Head of Household | Head of Household | Cristian | Amanda | Evicted (Day 41) | | | | Comeback; House | Evicted (Day 41) | | | | | | | | |
| Cristian | Not in House | Gabriel T. Paula | Not eligible | ~~Guimê~~ | Larissa | Fred N. | Fred N. | Evicted (Day 37) | | | | | Comeback; House | Evicted (Day 37) | | | | | | | | |
| Bruno | Not in House | Fred N. Marília | Not eligible | Cristian | Cezar | Fred N. | Walked (Day 33) | | | | | | | | | | | | | | | |
| Paula | Glass; House | Fred N. Marília | Not eligible | Domitila | Cezar | Fred N. | Evicted (Day 30) | | | | | | Comeback; House | Evicted (Day 30) | | | | | | | | |
| Tina | Not in House | Fred N. Marília^{(x2)} | Not eligible | Domitila | Cezar | Evicted (Day 23) | | | | | | | Comeback; House | Evicted (Day 23) | | | | | | | | |
| Gabriel T. | Glass; House | Fred N. Marília | Not eligible | Domitila | Evicted (Day 16) | | | | | | | | Comeback; House | Evicted (Day 16) | | | | | | | | |
| Marília | Not in House | Gabriel T. Paula | Nominated | Evicted (Day 11) | | | | | | | | | Comeback; House | Evicted (Day 11) | | | | | | | | |
| Giovanna | Glass; House | Evicted (Glass House) | | | | | | | | | | | | | | | | | | | | |
| Manoel | Glass; House | Evicted (Glass House) | | | | | | | | | | | | | | | | | | | | |
| Notes | 1 | 2, 3, 4, 5, 6 | | 7, 8, 9, 10, 11 | 12, 13, 14 | 10, 15, 16, 17, 18 | 18, 19, 20, 21, 22 | 18, 23, 24, 25 | 26, 27, 28, 29 | 30, 31, 32, 33, 34, 35 | 36, 37, 38, 39, 40 | 10, 41, 42, 43 | 44 | 27, 45, 46, 47 | 48, 49, 50, 51 | 27, 52, 53, 54, 55, 56 | 10, 18 | 18, 57, 58, 59 | 18, 60 | 18 | 61 | 62 |
| Nominated for Eviction | Gabriel T. Manoel | Fred N. & Marília; Gustavo & Key | Fred N. Marília | Cezar; Domitila; Gabriel T. | Cezar; Gabriel S. Tina | Amanda; Bruno; Guimê; Paula | Cristian; Fred C. Ricardo | Domitila; Fred N. Gustavo | Antônio; Cezar; Fred N. | Domitila; Key; Sarah Aline | Cezar; Domitila; Larissa; Ricardo | Domitila; Fred C. Gabriel S. | Cristian; ~~Fred C.~~; Fred N. Gabriel T. Gustavo; Key; Larissa; Marília; Paula; Tina | Aline; Bruna; Gabriel S. | Amanda; Domitila; Larissa; Marvvila | Bruna; Fred N. Sarah Aline | Aline; Amanda; Cezar | Aline; Bruna; Sarah Aline | Amanda; Domitila; Larissa | Larissa; Ricardo | Aline; Bruna; Larissa | Aline; Amanda; Bruna |
| Nominated for Eviction | Giovanna; Paula | Fred N. & Marília; Gustavo & Key | Fred N. Marília | Cezar; Domitila; Gabriel T. | Cezar; Gabriel S. Tina | Amanda; Bruno; Guimê; Paula | Cristian; Fred C. Ricardo | Domitila; Fred N. Gustavo | Antônio; Cezar; Fred N. | Domitila; Key; Sarah Aline | Cezar; Domitila; Larissa; Ricardo | Domitila; Fred C. Gabriel S. | Cristian; ~~Fred C.~~; Fred N. Gabriel T. Gustavo; Key; Larissa; Marília; Paula; Tina | Aline; Bruna; Gabriel S. | Amanda; Domitila; Larissa; Marvvila | Bruna; Fred N. Sarah Aline | Aline; Amanda; Cezar | Aline; Bruna; Sarah Aline | Amanda; Domitila; Larissa | Larissa; Ricardo | Aline; Bruna; Larissa | Aline; Amanda; Bruna |
| Walked | (none) | | | | | | Bruno | (none) | | | | (none) | (none) | | | | | | | | | |
| Ejected | (none) | | | | | | (none) | (none) | | | | Antônio | (none) | | | | | | | | | |
| Ejected | (none) | | | | | | (none) | (none) | | | | Guimê | (none) | | | | | | | | | |
| Evicted | Manoel; 35% to enter | Fred N. & Marília; 69% to nominate | Marília; 53% to evict | Gabriel T. 53% to evict | Tina; 54% to evict | Paula; 72% to evict | Cristian; 48% to evict | Gustavo; 72% to evict | Fred N. 63% to evict | Key; 57% to evict | Larissa; 67% to evict | Fred C. 50.23% to evict | Larissa; 31% to return | Gabriel S. 56% to evict | Marvvila; 17% to save | Fred N. 51% to evict | Cezar; 49% to evict | Sarah Aline; 58% to evict | Domitila; 60% to evict | Ricardo; 69% to evict | Larissa; 50% to evict | Bruna; 14% to win |
| Evicted | Giovanna; 39% to enter | Fred N. & Marília; 69% to nominate | Marília; 53% to evict | Gabriel T. 53% to evict | Tina; 54% to evict | Paula; 72% to evict | Cristian; 48% to evict | Gustavo; 72% to evict | Fred N. 63% to evict | Key; 57% to evict | Larissa; 67% to evict | Fred C. 50.23% to evict | Fred N. 25% to return | Gabriel S. 56% to evict | Marvvila; 17% to save | Fred N. 51% to evict | Cezar; 49% to evict | Sarah Aline; 58% to evict | Domitila; 60% to evict | Ricardo; 69% to evict | Larissa; 50% to evict | Aline; 17% to win |
| Survived | Gabriel T. 65% to enter | Gustavo & Key; 31% to nominate | Fred N. 47% to evict | Domitila; 46% to evict | Cezar; 43% to evict | Bruno; 24% to evict | Ricardo; 41% to evict | Fred N. 24% to evict | Antônio; 36% to evict | Sarah Aline; 42% to evict | Ricardo; 29% to evict | Domitila; 48.69% to evict | Key; 22% to return | Bruna; 43% to evict | Larissa; 23% to save | Bruna; 48% to evict | Aline; 46% to evict | Bruna; 41% to evict | Larissa; 39% to evict | Larissa; 31% to evict | Bruna; 42% to evict | Amanda; 69% to win |
| Survived | Gabriel T. 65% to enter | Gustavo & Key; 31% to nominate | Fred N. 47% to evict | Domitila; 46% to evict | Cezar; 43% to evict | Bruno; 24% to evict | Ricardo; 41% to evict | Fred N. 24% to evict | Antônio; 36% to evict | Sarah Aline; 42% to evict | Ricardo; 29% to evict | Domitila; 48.69% to evict | Gabriel T. 7% to return | Bruna; 43% to evict | Larissa; 23% to save | Bruna; 48% to evict | Aline; 46% to evict | Bruna; 41% to evict | Larissa; 39% to evict | Larissa; 31% to evict | Bruna; 42% to evict | Amanda; 69% to win |
| Survived | Gabriel T. 65% to enter | Gustavo & Key; 31% to nominate | Fred N. 47% to evict | Domitila; 46% to evict | Cezar; 43% to evict | Bruno; 24% to evict | Ricardo; 41% to evict | Fred N. 24% to evict | Antônio; 36% to evict | Sarah Aline; 42% to evict | Ricardo; 29% to evict | Domitila; 48.69% to evict | Cristian; 6% to return | Bruna; 43% to evict | Larissa; 23% to save | Bruna; 48% to evict | Aline; 46% to evict | Bruna; 41% to evict | Larissa; 39% to evict | Larissa; 31% to evict | Bruna; 42% to evict | Amanda; 69% to win |
| Survived | Gabriel T. 65% to enter | Gustavo & Key; 31% to nominate | Fred N. 47% to evict | Domitila; 46% to evict | Cezar; 43% to evict | Guimê; 2% to evict | Ricardo; 41% to evict | Fred N. 24% to evict | Antônio; 36% to evict | Sarah Aline; 42% to evict | Domitila; 3% to evict | Domitila; 48.69% to evict | Cristian; 6% to return | Bruna; 43% to evict | Domitila; 26% to save | Bruna; 48% to evict | Aline; 46% to evict | Bruna; 41% to evict | Larissa; 39% to evict | Larissa; 31% to evict | Bruna; 42% to evict | Amanda; 69% to win |
| Survived | Gabriel T. 65% to enter | Gustavo & Key; 31% to nominate | Fred N. 47% to evict | Domitila; 46% to evict | Cezar; 43% to evict | Guimê; 2% to evict | Ricardo; 41% to evict | Fred N. 24% to evict | Antônio; 36% to evict | Sarah Aline; 42% to evict | Domitila; 3% to evict | Domitila; 48.69% to evict | Gustavo; 5% to return | Bruna; 43% to evict | Domitila; 26% to save | Bruna; 48% to evict | Aline; 46% to evict | Bruna; 41% to evict | Larissa; 39% to evict | Larissa; 31% to evict | Bruna; 42% to evict | Amanda; 69% to win |
| Survived | Paula; 61% to enter | Gustavo & Key; 31% to nominate | Fred N. 47% to evict | Cezar; 1% to evict | Gabriel S. 3% to evict | Guimê; 2% to evict | Fred C. 11% to evict | Domitila; 4% to evict | Cezar; 1% to evict | Domitila; 1% to evict | Domitila; 3% to evict | Gabriel S. 1% to evict | Gustavo; 5% to return | Aline; 1% to evict | Domitila; 26% to save | Sarah Aline; 1% to evict | Amanda; 5% to evict | Aline; 1% to evict | Amanda; 1% to evict | Larissa; 31% to evict | Aline; 8% to evict | Amanda; 69% to win |
| Survived | Paula; 61% to enter | Gustavo & Key; 31% to nominate | Fred N. 47% to evict | Cezar; 1% to evict | Gabriel S. 3% to evict | Guimê; 2% to evict | Fred C. 11% to evict | Domitila; 4% to evict | Cezar; 1% to evict | Domitila; 1% to evict | Domitila; 3% to evict | Gabriel S. 1% to evict | Tina; 2% to return | Aline; 1% to evict | Domitila; 26% to save | Sarah Aline; 1% to evict | Amanda; 5% to evict | Aline; 1% to evict | Amanda; 1% to evict | Larissa; 31% to evict | Aline; 8% to evict | Amanda; 69% to win |
| Survived | Paula; 61% to enter | Gustavo & Key; 31% to nominate | Fred N. 47% to evict | Cezar; 1% to evict | Gabriel S. 3% to evict | Amanda; 2% to evict | Fred C. 11% to evict | Domitila; 4% to evict | Cezar; 1% to evict | Domitila; 1% to evict | Cezar; 1% to evict | Gabriel S. 1% to evict | Tina; 2% to return | Aline; 1% to evict | Amanda; 34% to save | Sarah Aline; 1% to evict | Amanda; 5% to evict | Aline; 1% to evict | Amanda; 1% to evict | Larissa; 31% to evict | Aline; 8% to evict | Amanda; 69% to win |
| Survived | Paula; 61% to enter | Gustavo & Key; 31% to nominate | Fred N. 47% to evict | Cezar; 1% to evict | Gabriel S. 3% to evict | Amanda; 2% to evict | Fred C. 11% to evict | Domitila; 4% to evict | Cezar; 1% to evict | Domitila; 1% to evict | Cezar; 1% to evict | Gabriel S. 1% to evict | Marília; 1% to return | Aline; 1% to evict | Amanda; 34% to save | Sarah Aline; 1% to evict | Amanda; 5% to evict | Aline; 1% to evict | Amanda; 1% to evict | Larissa; 31% to evict | Aline; 8% to evict | Amanda; 69% to win |
| Survived | Paula; 61% to enter | Gustavo & Key; 31% to nominate | Fred N. 47% to evict | Cezar; 1% to evict | Gabriel S. 3% to evict | Amanda; 2% to evict | Fred C. 11% to evict | Domitila; 4% to evict | Cezar; 1% to evict | Domitila; 1% to evict | Cezar; 1% to evict | Gabriel S. 1% to evict | Paula; 1% to return | Aline; 1% to evict | Amanda; 34% to save | Sarah Aline; 1% to evict | Amanda; 5% to evict | Aline; 1% to evict | Amanda; 1% to evict | Larissa; 31% to evict | Aline; 8% to evict | Amanda; 69% to win |
| Votes | — | 33,126,930 | 32,691,714 | 100,089,771 | 47,355,976 | 34,376,565 | 93,462,107 | 136,793,098 | 222,409,339 | 119,169,199 | 110,472,736 | 59,185,009 | 81,913,084 | 121,556,606 | 126,716,034 | 196,600,996 | 181,228,561 | 84,567,591 | 125,027,405 | 64,554,986 | 22,183,853 | 76,290,810 |

=== Notes ===
- ^Note 1: Gabriel Tavares, Giovanna, Manoel and Paula, entered the Glass House before the premiere, where the public voted to choose two of them (one man and one woman) to become part of the cast. Gabriel Tavares and Paula received the most votes and moved into the main house on Day 1 with the remaining housemates.
- ^Note 2: During Week 1, all housemates competed as duos. Duos would win competitions and hold power together, and would vote and be nominated together.
- ^Note 3: On Day 1, the housemates competed in an endurance competition for immunity. After 12 hours, Fred Carneiro & Ricardo won immunity for the first nominations. Guimê & Tina and Cristian & Marvvila were vetoed from competing in the HoH competition for being the first two duos out.
- ^Note 4: As the winners of this week's Joker Power, Guimê & Tina's vote on Fred Nicácio & Marília counted as two.
- ^Note 5: This week, the House's nominees had the power to name an additional nominees. During the nominations, the Housemates nominated Fred Nicácio & Marília, who in turn nominated Gabriel Tavares & Paula.
- ^Note 6: The duos split up on Day 9 after the reveal of the first public vote. Tadeu then informed that the chosen duo would move to a Secret Room where there would be a second vote to determine which housemate from the duo (either Fred Nicácio or Marília) would be officially evicted as an individual on Day 11.
- ^Note 7: For surviving the fake duo eviction on Week 1, Fred Nicácio received immunity for the week.
- ^Note 8: For winning the HoH competition alongside Antônio, Amanda received immunity for the week.
- ^Note 9: This week, the HoH's nominee had the power to name an additional nominee. During the nominations, Antônio, as HoH, nominated Cezar, who in turn nominated Gabriel Tavares.
- ^Note 10: This week, the top 2 vote recipients became the House's Nominees.
- ^Note 11: As the winner of this week's Joker Power, Antônio had the power to veto one of the House's nominees (Domitila or Guimê) or not interfere with the nominations. After announcing the nominations, Antônio decided to use him Power of Veto and saved Guimê from the block, making the third highest vote getter, Cristian, as the replacement nominee.
- ^Note 12: On Day 20, Tina answered the Big Phone and was told to immediately nominate two housemates for eviction. She chose Domitila and Gabriel Santana.
- ^Note 13: As the winner of this week's Joker Power, Paula had the power to veto one of the Big Phone's nominees (Domitila or Gabriel Santana). Before the nominations took place, Paula saved Domitila from the block, leaving Gabriel Santana as a nominee for the eviction.
- ^Note 14: This week, the Big Phone's nominee who wasn't saved by the Joker Power had the power to name an additional nominee, with the exception of the housemate who answered the Big Phone and the Joker Power holder themself. Before the nominations, Tina, who answered the Big Phone, nominated Domitila and Gabriel Santana, with Domitila being saved by Paula's Joker Power, leaving Gabriel Santana as nominated, who in turn nominated Amanda.
- ^Note 15: On Day 25, Gustavo answered the Big Phone and was automatically nominated for eviction and instructed to nominate an additional housemate. He chose Bruno. Both Gustavo and Bruno were still allowed to compete in the HoH competition, and if one of them were to win, they would be then spared from the block, with the public being informed beforehand that the replacement nominee would be the second most voted houseguest during Sunday's nominations. Gustavo became HoH and was therefore saved from the block.
- ^Note 16: For winning the Power of Immunity competition alongside Amanda, Antônio received immunity for the week. They were only told of this fact during Live Nominations.
- ^Note 17: As the winner of this week's Joker Power, Key was required to directly nominate someone for eviction. Much like a HoH nomination, the chosen person would also not be eligible to compete for the veto. She nominated Paula.
- ^Note 18: This week, the Housemates voted in Face-to-Face nominations instead of voting in the Diary Room.
- ^Note 19: The first nine housemates eliminated from Week 5's HoH competition (Antônio, Gustavo, Larissa, Gabriel Santana, Bruno, Fred Carneiro, Key, Domitila and Marvvila) would each draw a 'bottle of consequences'. Antônio was banned from voting, Gustavo, Gabriel Santana and Key were vetoed from next week's HoH competition, Larissa was vetoed from this week's Power of Immunity competition, Bruno was prevented from bidding on this week's Joker Power, Fred Carneiro was automatically nominated for eviction, Domitila automatically became a Have-Not, and Marvvila had to eliminate another housemate from the competition, with Cristian being the chosen.
- ^Note 20: On Day 33, Bruno pressed the Withdrawn Button and left the House.
- ^Note 21: As the winner of this week's Joker Power, Cristian was required to ban one housemate from voting. He chose Fred Nicácio.
- ^Note 22: This week, the HoH competition's nominee had the power to name an additional nominee. Before the nominations, Fred Carneiro was automatically nominated for eviction, who in turn nominated Domitila.
- ^Note 23: On Day 39, the HoH's nominee had the power to name an additional nominee. During the nominations, Sarah Aline, as HoH, nominated Antônio, who in turn nominated Fred Nicácio.
- ^Note 24: On Day 39, Guimê answered the Big Phone and won the "Higher Power". Unknown to him fellow housemates, he could overthrow the HoH, the House votes, the Big Phone or the Counterattack and replace the nominations. This power could only be used once and within the next eviction. After announcing the nominations, Guimê played his "Higher Power" and to overthrow the HoH, Sarah Aline. He decided to change Sarah Aline's decision, leaving saved Antônio from the block, and chose Gustavo (who had received his vote above) to replace Antônio on the nomination.
- ^Note 25: No Power of Veto competition was held this round.
- ^Note 26: On Day 41, Sarah Aline answered the Big Phone and was awarded immunity and instructed to nominate an additional housemate for eviction. She chose Antônio.
- ^Note 27: This week, the Power of Immunity winner won immunity for themselves, rather than having to give immunity to someone. They were only told of this fact during Live Nominations.
- ^Note 28: As the winner of this week's Power of Immunity, Guimê had the power to nominate someone for eviction on Sunday. He nominated Key.
- ^Note 29: As Head of Household, Bruna was forced to break the tie between Aline and Cezar (with seven votes each). She nominated Cezar.
- ^Note 30: On Day 45, Guimê answered the Big Phone and was told to immediately nominate two housemates for eviction. He chose Cezar and Key. On Day 48, Cezar answered the Big Phone and was told to save one of these two nominees. He saved himself.
- ^Note 31: For this week's nominations, the housemates were divided into two groups (Blue and Yellow) by random draw, with the top vote getter on each group being nominated.
- ^Note 32: As the winner of this week's Joker Power, Sarah Aline was allowed to choose which one of the voting groups she would like to be part of. She chose to be part of the Yellow group.
- ^Note 33: As Head of Household, Fred Carneiro was forced to break the tie on the Yellow group vote between Larissa and Marvvila (with three votes each). He nominated Marvvila.
- ^Note 34: This week, the Big Phone's nominee saved by the second Big Phone had the power to name an additional nominee. Cezar answered the Big Phone and saved himself, and in turn nominated Guimê.
- ^Note 35: Week 7 featured the final veto competition and it was a double Veto. Of the 4 Veto players, 2 would win a veto and avoid nominations, leaving the other two facing Brazil's vote alongside the HoH's nominee.
- ^Note 36: On Day 53, Domitila pressed the surprise button in the backyard and was required to choose one person to go with her to the White Room. She chose Fred Carneiro. They competed in an endurance competition, where the winner would immediately return to the house with immunity and win a car (Fred Carneiro), while the loser would be automatically nominated, without be eligible to compete for the veto (Domitila).
- ^Note 37: Week 8's HoH competition, was a pairs endurance competition. The first four duos eliminated from Week 8's HoH competition (Aline & Sarah Aline, Bruna & Larissa, Gabriel Santana & Marvvila and Amanda & Antônio) would each draw a 'bottle of consequences'. Aline & Sarah Aline were vetoed from next week's HoH competition, Bruna & Larissa automatically became a Have-Not, Gabriel Santana & Marvvila were prevented from bidding on this week's Joker Power, and Amanda & Antônio were vetoed from this week's Power of Immunity competition.
- ^Note 38: For this week's nominations, the housemates were divided into two groups (Blue and Orange) by random draw, and were required to vote for one person on the opposing group.
- ^Note 39: As the winner of this week's Joker Power, Aline was required to choose which one of the House's nominees would have the Counterattack. She chose Larissa, who was the nominee by the Orange group vote.
- ^Note 40: This week, the House's nominee who was chosen by the Joker Power had the power to name an additional nominee. During the nominations, the Housemates nominated Larissa and Marvvila, with Larissa being chosen to have the power to nominate by Aline's Joker Power, and in turn nominated Ricardo.
- ^Note 41: On Day 60, Antônio and Guimê were ejected from the house due to inappropriate behavior and sexual harassment towards the guest Dania Méndez, from La Casa de los Famosos, during HoH party on Day 59.
- ^Note 42: As the winner of this week's Joker Power, the nature of Ricardo's vote was decided by international guest Dania Méndez, from La Casa de los Famosos, who had the choice between nullifying his vote or making it count as two, with the former being chosen.
- ^Note 43: As the runner-up of the HoH competition, Amanda had the power to nominate someone for eviction on Sunday. She nominated Marvvila.
- ^Note 44: On Week 10, the first 10 evicted housemates (with the exception of Antônio, Bruno and Guimê) were brought back and entered the Comeback House, where the public voted to choose two of them to back into the game. Shortly after being evicted on Day 65, Fred Carneiro, who joined the Comeback House, chose not to continue in the twist before the public vote started. Fred Nicácio and Larissa received the most votes and returned to the game on Day 67.
- ^Note 45: As the winner from Globoplay's special action, Marvvila was required to ban one housemate from voting. She chose Amanda.
- ^Note 46: As the winner of this week's Joker Power, Amanda was required to nominate one of the fewest voted from the house. She nominated Gabriel Santana, who was one of the least voted in the house vote.
- ^Note 47: This week, the Joker Power's nominee had the power to name an additional nominee. During the nominations, Amanda, as Joker Power holder, nominated Gabriel Santana, who in turn nominated Aline.
- ^Note 48: As the winner of this week's Joker Power, Sarah Aline received immunity for the week. They were only told of this fact during Live Nominations.
- ^Note 49: This week, the housemates had to vote for two different housemates during nominations. The top 2 vote recipients became the House's Nominees.
- ^Note 50: This week, the two House's nominees each had the power to save one of the housemates. During the nominations, the Housemates nominated Larissa, who in turn saved Ricardo, and Amanda, who in turn saved Fred Nicácio, automatically nominating Cezar and Marvvila for eviction.
- ^Note 51: The Brazilian public will then vote to save and the nominee with the fewest votes will be evicted.
- ^Note 52: As the winner of this week's Power of Immunity, Cezar had the power to immediately nominate two housemates for eviction. He nominated Aline and Amanda.
- ^Note 53: As Head of Household, Ricardo was forced to break the tie between Bruna and Sarah Aline (with four votes each). He nominated Bruna.
- ^Note 54: As the winner of this week's Joker Power, Aline was required to exchange one of the Power of Immunity's nominees by another housemate. She chose to save herself from the block and replaced her with Sarah Aline on the nomination.
- ^Note 55: This week, the HoH's nominee had to save one of the Power of Immunity's nominees. During the nominations, Ricardo, as HoH, nominated Fred Nicácio, who in turn saved Sarah Aline from the block, leaving Amanda as a nominee for the eviction.
- ^Note 56: This week, the Power of Immunity's nominee who wasn't saved had the power to name an additional nominee. Before the nominations, Cezar, as Power of Immunity holder, nominated Aline and Amanda, with Aline being saved by Joker Power herself, after to replace herself for Sarah Aline, making the replacement nominee, who in turn was saved by Fred Nicácio, who was HoH's nominee, leaving Amanda as nominated, who in turn nominated Sarah Aline.
- ^Note 57: This week, the two housemates who had received the Monster Punishment from the winner of the Power of Immunity competed in an throwing competition, where the loser would receive two votes in the House's vote. Sarah Aline won the Power of Immunity competition and chose Amanda and Bruna. Before the nominations, Amanda won the competition, while Bruna lost the competition and received two votes in the House's vote.
- ^Note 58: As Head of Household, Domitila was forced to break the tie between Bruna and Sarah Aline (with four votes each). She nominated Bruna.
- ^Note 59: On Day 89, the HoH's nominee had the power to name an additional nominee. During the nominations, Domitila, as HoH, nominated Aline, who in turn nominated Sarah Aline.
- ^Note 60: On Day 91, the House's nominee had the power to name an additional nominee. During the nominations, the Housemates nominated Domitila, who in turn nominated Larissa.
- ^Note 61: Amanda won the final competition, winning immunity for the final eviction and granting his place in the Finale. Aline, Bruna and Larissa were automatically nominated for eviction by default.
- ^Note 62: For the final, the public will vote for the housemate they want to win Big Brother Brasil 23.

=== Have and Have-Nots ===
| | Week 1 | Week 2 | Week 3 | Week 4 | Week 5^{1} | Week 6 | | Week 7 | Week 8^{2} | Week 9^{3} | Week 10 | Week 11 | Week 12 | Week 13 | | | Week 14 | |
| | Week 1 | Week 2 | Week 3 | Week 4 | Week 5^{1} | Day 39 | Day 42 | Week 7 | Week 8^{2} | Week 9^{3} | Week 10 | Week 11 | Week 12 | Day 86 | Day 88 | Day 91 | Day 93 | Day 96 |
|---|---|---|---|---|---|---|---|---|---|---|---|---|---|---|---|---|---|---|
| Amanda | Have | Have | Have-Not | Have-Not | Have-Not | Have-Not | Have-Not | Have-Not | Have-Not | Have | Have-Not | Have | Have-Not | Have-Not | Have-Not | Have-Not | Have-Not | Have |
| Aline | Have-Not | Have | Have-Not | Have-Not | Have | Have-Not | Have-Not | Have | Have | Have-Not | Have-Not | Have | Have-Not | Have-Not | Have-Not | Have-Not | Have-Not | Have |
| Bruna | Have | Have-Not | Have-Not | Have-Not | Have-Not | Have-Not | Have | Have | Have-Not | Have | Have-Not | Have | Have-Not | Have-Not | Have-Not | Have-Not | Have | Have |
| Larissa | Have | Have | Have-Not | Have-Not | Have-Not | Have-Not | Have | Have | Have-Not | | Have-Not | Have-Not | Have-Not | Have-Not | Have-Not | Have-Not | Have | Have |
| Ricardo | Have | Have-Not | Have-Not | Have-Not | Have-Not | Have | Have-Not | Have-Not | Have-Not | Have-Not | Have | Have-Not | Have | Have | Have-Not | Have | Have-Not | |
| Domitila | Have-Not | Have-Not | Have-Not | Have | Have-Not | Have-Not | Have-Not | Have-Not | Have-Not | Have-Not | Have-Not | Have-Not | Have | Have-Not | Have | Have | | |
| Sarah Aline | Have-Not | Have-Not | Have-Not | Have | Have-Not | Have | Have-Not | Have-Not | Have-Not | Have-Not | Have | Have-Not | Have | Have | Have | | | |
| Cezar | Have-Not | Have-Not | Have | Have-Not | Have-Not | Have-Not | Have-Not | Have-Not | Have-Not | Have-Not | Have-Not | Have-Not | Have-Not | Have | | | | |
| Fred N. | Have-Not | Have-Not | Have | Have | Have | Have | Have-Not | | | | Have-Not | Have-Not | Have-Not | | | | | |
| Marvvila | Have-Not | Have-Not | Have | Have-Not | Have-Not | Have | Have-Not | Have-Not | Have-Not | Have-Not | Have | Have-Not | | | | | | |
| Gabriel S. | Have-Not | Have-Not | Have | Have-Not | Have | Have | Have-Not | Have-Not | Have-Not | Have-Not | Have | | | | | | | |
| Fred C. | Have | Have | Have-Not | Have-Not | Have-Not | Have-Not | Have | Have | Have-Not | Have-Not | | | | | | | | |
| Antônio | Have | Have | Have-Not | Have-Not | Have-Not | Have-Not | Have | Have-Not | Have | | | | | | | | | |
| Guimê | Have | Have | Have-Not | Have-Not | Have-Not | Have-Not | Have | Have-Not | Have | | | | | | | | | |
| Key | Have-Not | Have-Not | Have | Have | Have | Have-Not | Have-Not | Have-Not | | | | | | | | | | |
| Gustavo | Have-Not | Have-Not | Have | Have | Have | Have-Not | | | | | | | | | | | | |
| Cristian | Have-Not | Have-Not | Have | Have | Have-Not | | | | | | | | | | | | | |
| Bruno | Have-Not | Have | Have-Not | Have-Not | | | | | | | | | | | | | | |
| Paula | Have | Have | Have-Not | Have-Not | | | | | | | | | | | | | | |
| Tina | Have | Have-Not | Have-Not | | | | | | | | | | | | | | | |
| Gabriel T. | Have | Have-Not | | | | | | | | | | | | | | | | |
| Marília | Have-Not | | | | | | | | | | | | | | | | | |

- ^Note 1: On week 5, Cezar became have-not after Ricardo picked him for the Monster Punishment.
- ^Note 2: On week 8, Ricardo became have-not after Cezar & Larissa picked him for the Monster Punishment.
- ^Note 3: On week 9, Aline and Fred Carneiro became have-not after Gabriel Santana picked them for the Monster Punishment.

== Ratings and reception ==
=== Brazilian ratings ===
All numbers are in points and provided by Kantar Ibope Media.

| Week | First air date | Last air date | Timeslot (BRT) | Daily SP viewers (in points) | | | | | | | SP viewers (in points) | BR viewers (in points) | Ref. |
| Week | First air date | Last air date | Timeslot (BRT) | Mon | Tue | Wed | Thu | Fri | Sat | Sun | SP viewers (in points) | BR viewers (in points) | Ref. |
|---|---|---|---|---|---|---|---|---|---|---|---|---|---|
| 1 | January 16, 2023 | January 22, 2023 | Monday to Saturday; 10:30 p.m. Sunday; 11:30 p.m. | 22.7 | 19.7 | 20.9 | 17.9 | 17.9 | 16.2 | 14.7 | 18.6 | 18.7 | |
| 2 | January 23, 2023 | January 29, 2023 | Monday to Saturday; 10:30 p.m. Sunday; 11:30 p.m. | 19.4 | 18.6 | 20.1 | 19.9 | 18.3 | 18.9 | 14.9 | 18.6 | —N/a | |
| 3 | January 30, 2023 | February 5, 2023 | Monday to Saturday; 10:30 p.m. Sunday; 11:30 p.m. | 19.7 | 18.9 | 18.3 | 16.9 | 18.7 | 18.0 | 15.6 | 18.0 | —N/a | |
| 4 | February 6, 2023 | February 12, 2023 | Monday to Saturday; 10:30 p.m. Sunday; 11:30 p.m. | 19.4 | 18.7 | 18.9 | 18.7 | 18.3 | 17.2 | 15.0 | 18.0 | —N/a | |
| 5 | February 13, 2023 | February 19, 2023 | Monday to Saturday; 10:30 p.m. Sunday; 11:30 p.m. | 19.0 | 19.8 | 18.5 | 17.1 | 21.9 | 19.1 | 17.2 | 18.9 | —N/a | |
| 6 | February 20, 2023 | February 26, 2023 | Monday to Saturday; 10:30 p.m. Sunday; 11:30 p.m. | 20.3 | 18.8 | 20.2 | 20.5 | 19.9 | 20.4 | 17.0 | 19.6 | —N/a | |
| 7 | February 27, 2023 | March 5, 2023 | Monday to Saturday; 10:30 p.m. Sunday; 11:30 p.m. | 20.4 | 20.4 | 20.9 | 18.2 | 21.2 | 18.3 | 16.7 | 19.4 | —N/a | |
| 8 | March 6, 2023 | March 12, 2023 | Monday to Saturday; 10:30 p.m. Sunday; 11:30 p.m. | 20.9 | 20.8 | 19.5 | 19.1 | 22.2 | 19.9 | 14.5 | 19.5 | —N/a | |
| 9 | March 13, 2023 | March 19, 2023 | Monday to Saturday; 10:30 p.m. Sunday; 11:30 p.m. | 18.6 | 20.8 | 21.5 | 21.0 | 21.0 | 19.7 | 15.7 | 19.8 | 19.4 | |
| 10 | March 20, 2023 | March 26, 2023 | Monday to Saturday; 10:30 p.m. Sunday; 11:30 p.m. | 20.0 | 20.3 | 19.8 | 20.7 | 19.2 | 17.9 | 14.6 | 18.9 | 19.3 | |
| 11 | March 27, 2023 | April 2, 2023 | Monday to Saturday; 10:30 p.m. Sunday; 11:30 p.m. | 19.9 | 20.5 | 19.4 | 18.9 | 21.6 | 17.7 | 14.7 | 19.0 | —N/a | |
| 12 | April 3, 2023 | April 9, 2023 | Monday to Saturday; 10:30 p.m. Sunday; 11:30 p.m. | 19.7 | 19.4 | 11.3 | 20.7 | 19.2 | 18.0 | 15.4 | 17.7 | —N/a | |
| 13 | April 10, 2023 | April 16, 2023 | Monday to Saturday; 10:30 p.m. Sunday; 11:30 p.m. | 19.4 | 19.9 | 19.4 | 19.7 | 20.8 | 19.5 | 15.2 | 19.1 | —N/a | |
| 14 | April 17, 2023 | April 23, 2023 | Monday to Saturday; 10:30 p.m. Sunday; 11:30 p.m. | 20.2 | 19.7 | 10.8 | 19.5 | 19.1 | 18.8 | 14.5 | 17.5 | —N/a | |
| 15 | April 24, 2023 | April 25, 2023 | Monday to Saturday; 10:30 p.m. Sunday; 11:30 p.m. | 18.5 | 19.7 | — | — | — | — | — | 19.1 | 20.0 | |

- In 2023, each point represents 268.083 households in 15 market cities in Brazil (76.953 households in São Paulo).
