= Top Talent =

- Genre: Talent show
- Presented by: Elliott Ashby (2013–)
- Judges: C.J. Allen (2013-); Bronwyn Mullen (2013); Punita Bajaj (2013-); MC Lucid (2013-)
- Country of origin: South Korea
- Original language: English
- No. of seasons: 1

Production
- Production company: Seconds2Impact Media

Top Talent (Korean: 탑 탤런트) is a talent show competition for English speaking performers in South Korea. The competition features singers, dancers, magicians, comedians, rappers, beat-boxers and other performers age 12 and up competing for a cash prize and the opportunity to appear on stage at a festival and venues around Korea. The first competition was held over the course of three days in June and July 2013.

Among its significant features, Top Talent was the first talent competition in South Korea to provide amateur and professional English speaking performers with the opportunity to perform in a large scale talent search process with the winner ultimately being decided by an audience vote in the show's finale. The show incorporates many of the characteristics seen in popular reality television talent competitions such as America's Got Talent and The X-Factor.

== Selection Process ==
=== Auditions ===
Acts audition in front of a panel of four judges and a live audience. Acts have 90 seconds to perform before being voted upon by the judges. If the act receives three votes or a unanimous vote from the judges, they move on to the call-back round.

=== Call-Backs ===
During the Call-Back round, acts must perform a new routine or song that they did not perform for their audition. After all of the acts have performed, the judges deliberate to determine the Top 12 acts that will perform at the finale. The judges choose eight acts together and also have a "judge's choice" act selected by each judge individually to make up the Top 12.

=== Judge's Choice ===
Aside from the eight acts that the judges choose together to be part of the Top 12 as part of the call-back round deliberation process, each judge also selected one act to be their "judge's choice".

=== Finale ===
In the finale, the Top 12 acts each have the opportunity to perform on a large theater stage in front of the judges and a live audience. Following the performances, the judges eliminate six acts to determine the Top 6 from which the audience will determine the winner.

== Season Synopses ==
=== Season 1 (2013) ===
In the winter of 2012, Seconds2Impact Media announced that it would be launching South Korea's first all-English talent search competition with auditions taking place in June 2013. In spring 2013, the host and judges were announced with radio personality Elliott Ashby acting as MC and television personality Bronwyn Mullen, reality TV singing competition finalist Punita Bajaj, media entrepreneur and talent promoter C.J. Allen and Korea's first expat comedian Sam Hammington set to judge. Prior to auditions however, Hammington announced that he would not be able to fulfill his role as a judge due to prior commitments. Hammington was then replaced by drum and bass performer MC Lucid.

In May 2013, it was announced that auditions and call-backs would be held at the Seoul Global Culture & Tourism Center in Myeong-dong, Seoul with the finale to take place at the Yongsan Art Hall and all three parts of the competition would be filmed and later released as a web-series through Seconds2Impact Media.

Acts that attended the auditions hailed from countries around the world including Canada, the United States, Singapore, England, Indonesia, Australia, the Philippines, South Korea, France, Pakistan, and South Korea. From the auditions, the judges put through 34 acts to the call-back round which were then whittled down to a Top 12.

Following performances by the Top 12 acts at the finale, the judging panel deliberated to decide which acts would make up the Top 6 and that would face the audience vote.

The winner of season 1 was soul/R&B/gospel singer Sonya-Maria from Hawaii and the runner-up was juggler Mickael Bellemene - a French national living in Singapore.

=== Season 2 ===
Plans for season 2 of Top Talent have not yet been officially announced by Seconds2Impact Media; however, in a radio interview on July 1, 2013, judge C.J. Allen alluded to a second season which might take place in fall 2013 in order to keep up with the momentum of season 1. Allen also said that if season 2 were to go ahead, he would return as one part of the yet to be announced judging panel.

== Series overview ==
=== Season 1 ===
Season	Start	Finish	Winner	Runner-up	Third place	Top 6	Top 12	Host	Judges
One	June 29, 2013	July 6, 2013	Sonya-Maria	Mickael Bellemene	Kite Flying Robot	Sonya-Maria Mickael Bellemene Kite Flying Robot Kyle & Tony Caleb Gore Wasted Johnny's	Sonya-Maria Mickael Bellemene Kite Flying Robot Kyle & Tony Caleb Gore Wasted Johnny's Caliph Knight Susie Baik Steam Marvel Alex Kaggwa Negative Motion Lux & Scotty Soul	Elliott Ashby	C.J. Allen Bronwyn Mullen Punita Bajaj MC Lucid

== Host and Judges ==
In March 2013, Top Talent producers announced that media producer, voice actor and radio personality Elliott Ashby had signed on to host Top Talent.

In the weeks that followed the announcement of Ashby as host, Top Talent began to reveal the names of the personalities that would form the four-person judging panel. South African native and Korean television personality Bronwyn Mullen was announced as the first judge set to the join followed by Canadian-born media entrepreneur C.J. Allen and Punita Bajaj, who had herself competed in a Korean reality television singing competition similar to American Idol. A midst heavy anticipation, Top Talent producers announced the fourth judge to be Sam Hammington - the first foreigner to have done comedian in the Korean language in Korea. Despite having done a large scale marketing campaign featuring the likenesses of all four judges, Hammington was forced to leave the panel as a result of a conflict with his filming schedule. Producers responded quickly by filling the vacant judge seat with Seoul based British drum and bass performer MC Lucid.

Following the success of season 1, Allen said he would return to the judging panel for season 2 if it moves forward. Ashby, Lucid and Bajaj have also expressed interest in returning for a second season but have not been confirmed.

== Prize ==
=== Season 1 ===
The winner of season 1 of Top Talent received 1 million South Korean won in cash and the opportunity to perform on a main sub-stage at the 13th annual Boryeong Mud Festival.
