= Marvvila =

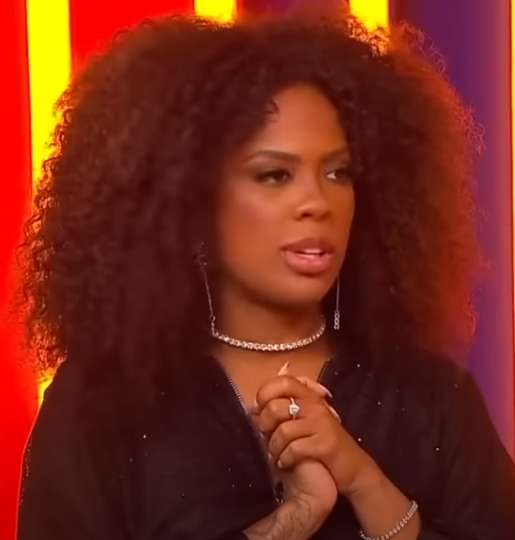
- Marvvila on Big Brother Brasil 23

Background information
- Birth name: Kassia Freire Marvila
- Born: 14 May 1999 (age 25); Rio de Janeiro, Brazil
- Genres: Pagode
- Occupation(s): Singer, reality show participant
- Years active: 2016–present

Kassia Freire Marvila (born 14 May 1999), better known as Marvvila, is a Brazilian pagode singer. In addition to her music, she is well known for her participation in The Voice Brasil in 2016, and later in Big Brother Brasil 23.

== Biography ==
=== Early life ===
Marvvila was born in 1999 in Rio de Janeiro, and comes from the neighborhood of Bento Ribeiro in the North Zone. She began singing at five years old. She initially sang gospel music at her church, but later on began to sing pagode after being introduced to the genre by her friends.

=== Career ===
In 2016, Marvvila was a contestant on The Voice Brasil. Though initially choosing to be part of Claudia Leitte's team, she was "stolen" and became a part of Lulu Santos' team. Songs she sang included Killing Me Softly with His Song and I Have Nothing. She was eliminated in the second Live Coaches' Battle.

Marvvila was featured on "Não é por maldade", a track on the Ludmilla EP Numanice. Their friendship and partnership began in 2020, the same year that Marvvila signed with Warner Music Brasil. Later that year, she released her first single, "Dizendo por Dizer". Being a female singer in a primarily male-dominated genre, she hopes to inspire other female artists, particularly Black women, to follow their dreams in whichever genre they want to pursue.

In 2021, she performed at the main ceremony for the 2021 Multishow Brazilian Music Award in Rio de Janeiro. Later on in 2022, at just 22 years old, Marvvila sang at Rock in Rio on the Espaço Favela stage. In June of that year, she launched her first live DVD, "Marvvila na Área", which included as guest singers Dilsinho, Xande de Pilares, Belo, and Sorriso Maroto.

In 2023, she became a contestant on Big Brother Brasil 23, as part of the Celebrity team. She was voted out and evicted on Week 11, after she, Domitila Barros, Larissa Santos, and the eventual winner Amanda Meirelles were put to an elimination vote.

Later in 2023, she released her first EP, Minha VVez. This was followed up by Só VVamo later that year.

== Personal life ==
As of 2024, she lives in the Vila da Penha neighborhood of Rio de Janeiro with her fiancée Cristiano Santana.

== Discography ==
=== EPs ===
- Minha VVez (2023)
- Só VVamo (2023)

=== Live albums ===
- Marvvila na Área (2021)
- Só VVamo (Ao Vivo) (2024)

== Filmography ==
=== Television ===
Year	Show	Role	Notes	Ref.
2016	The Voice Brasil	Participant	Season 5	
2023	Big Brother Brasil	Participant	Season 23	
