= Dance Se Puder season 1 =

Dance Se Puder
- Season 1
- Hosted by: Eliana
- Judges: Jaime Arôxa; Ivan Santos; and celebrity guest judges
- No. of contestants: 10
- Winner: Raissa Chaddad
- Runners-up: Gustavo Daneluz; Pedro Henrique

Release
- Original network: SBT
- Original release: March 27 – June 26, 2016

Season chronology
- Next → Season 2

Dance Se Puder (Dance If You Can) is a Brazilian talent show, presented as a segment on Programa Eliana, from the SBT network. Several celebrities compete dancing various music styles. They perform to a panel usually consisting of three judges. Viewers can vote and eliminate a participant per round.

== Judges ==
Contestants are given points from 0 to 10 by three judges, including the choreographers Jaime Arôxa and Ivan Santos, which is present in almost all stages of the competition, along with a guest. At the end of the competition, the winner will take a cash prize of R$50,000.

== Format ==
Two groups with five members each compete. Each contestant has to dance to a song chosen randomly and each has a week to prepare a dance performance. The two groups don't compete in the same week. The Supimpas show up on a Sunday and the Five Stars are presented in the following Sunday. Each contestant receives a score on a scale from 0 to 10 by the three judges. The three scores are calculated and the results of each group member are added together to form the final score. After the presentation and scores of the Five Stars, it's time to know which team scored higher. The team that has scored the most points is the winner, and all members are safe from elimination. The loser team is in the hot seat and the teammate who scored the less is automatically up for elimination. Plus, the loser team have to choose a second teammate of their own to face the audience's preference. The vote is set by text message.

In the second round, it was decided that one of the members of the Five Stars would have their points disregarded so that the average score of the teams would be balanced. Pedro Henrique was chosen, ironically being the one who had more points for his team in that round. If the Five Stars lost because of Pedro Henrique, he could not be placed in the bottom two since he won invincibility.

After the elimination of Jean in the third round, the Supimpas was depleted due to two consecutive eliminations. So the solution was to move a member of the Five Stars to the Supimpas. Gabriel was chosen and a random song was chosen for him for the fourth round.

In the fourth round the teams merged.

== Contestants ==
Team	Contestant	1	2	3	4	5	6	7	8
Team	Contestant	TEAMS			MERGE				
SUPIMPAS	Raissa; Chaddad	SAFE	SAFE	TOP	LOW	TOP	HIGH		WINNER
FIVE STARS	Pedro; Henrique	TOP	TOP	SAFE	SAFE	HIGH	HIGH		RUNNER UP
SUPIMPAS	Gustavo; Daneluz	LOW	BTM2	SAFE	TOP	SAFE	BTM2		RUNNER UP
SUPIMPAS	Gabriel; Santana	SAFE	TOP	SAFE	SAFE	BTM2	TOP		ELIM
FIVE STARS	Thomaz; Costa	SAFE	SAFE	BTM2	BTM2	ELIM		SAFE	ELIM
FIVE STARS	Fernanda; Concon	SAFE	SAFE	SAFE	HIGH	SAFE	ELIM	OUT	GUEST
SUPIMPAS	Amanda; Furtado	BTM2	SAFE	SAFE	ELIM			OUT	GUEST
FIVE STARS	Ana Vitória; Zimmermann	SAFE	SAFE	ELIM				OUT	GUEST
SUPIMPAS	Jean Paulo; Campos	SAFE	ELIM					OUT	GUEST
SUPIMPAS	Victória; Diniz	ELIM						OUT	GUEST

The contestant won Dance Se Puder.
The contestant was the runner-up of Dance Se Puder.
The contestant won with their team and had the highest score. / The contestant had the highest score and won individually.
The contestant was one of the best individually but didn't win.
The contestant was in the winning team.
The contestant won entry back into the competition.
The contestant was one of the worst but was not in the bottom two.
The contestant was in the bottom two.
The contestant was eliminated.
The contestant came back for a chance to win re-entry into the competition but lost.
The contestant did not participate in this episode.

- Since Pedro Henrique's score was disregarded, Gabriel became the one with more points on round 2.
- Amanda had the second-highest score in her group on the first round. Still, she was the most voted in her group and was placed in the bottom two. This caused controversy online.
- Raissa and Pedro Henrique are the only contestants to reach the final three without being in the bottom two.

== Songs assigned ==
CONTESTANT	ROUND 1	ROUND 2	ROUND 3	ROUND 4	ROUND 5	ROUND 6	REPECHAGE	FINAL
Raissa	"Bang" (Anitta)	"Crazy in Love" (Beyoncé)	"Candyman" (Christina Aguilera)	"Por Una Cabeza" (from Scent of a Woman)	"Lady Marmalade" (from Moulin Rouge!)	"Toxic" (Britney Spears)		"End of Time" (Beyoncé)
Gustavo	"Where Are Ü Now" (Skrillex, Diplo & Justin Bieber)	"Thriller" (Michael Jackson)	"Any Man of Mine" (Shania Twain)	"Try" (P!nk)	"Footloose" (from eponymous movie)	"Party Rock Anthem" (LMFAO)		"SexyBack" (Justin Timberlake)
Pedro	"Step by Step" (New Kids on the Block)	"Vou Desafiar Você" (MC Sapão)	"Pout Pourri" (Chris Brown)	"Puerto Rico" (from Salsa)	"Smooth Criminal" (Michael Jackson)	"Hey Mama" (David Guetta, Nicki Minaj, Bebe Rexha & Afrojack)		"Sorry" (Justin Bieber)
Gabriel	"Gangnam Style" (Psy)	"Uptown Funk" (Mark Ronson & Bruno Mars)	"G.D.F.R." (Flo Rida & Sage the Gemini)	"(I've Had) The Time of My Life" (from Dirty Dancing)	"Stayin' Alive (from Saturday Night Fever)	"Wiggle" (Jason Derulo & Snoop Dogg)		"Yeah!" (Usher)
Thomaz	"Paredão Metralhadora" (Banda Vingadora)	"U Can't Touch This" (MC Hammer)	"Jailhouse Rock" (Elvis Presley)	"You're the One That I Want" (from Grease)	"We're All In This Together" (from High School Musical)		"Ginza" (J Balvin)	"Billie Jean" (Michael Jackson)
Fernanda	"Where Have You Been" (Rihanna)	"Dark Horse" (Katy Perry & Juicy J)	"Dançando Calypso" (Banda Calypso)	"Thinking Out Loud" (Ed Sheeran)	"You Can't Stop the Beat" (from Hairspray)	"On the Floor" (Jennifer Lopez & Pitbull)	"Rockafeller Skank" (Fatboy Slim)	
Amanda	"Kajra Re" (Alisha Chinai, Javed Ali, Shankar Mahadevan)	"24 Horas por Dia" (Ludmilla)	"Love On Top" (Beyoncé)	"Spanish Tango" (from The Mask of Zorro)			"Não Me Deixe Sozinho" (Nego do Borel)	
Ana Vitória	"Chandelier" (Sia)	"Shake it Off" (Taylor Swift)	"Bang Bang" (Jessie J, Ariana Grande & Nicki Minaj)				"Black Widow" (Iggy Azalea & Rita Ora)	
Jean Paulo	"Watch Me (Whip/Nae Nae)" (Silentó)	"Livin' La Vida Loca" (Ricky Martin)					"Blame" (Calvin Harris & John Newman)	
Victória	"Worth It" (Fifth Harmony)						"Pra Frente" (Ivete Sangalo)	

Voted the best performance of the season by the audience.

== Audience's vote ==
	1	2	3	4	5	6	7	8	
Eliminated	Victória; 87% to evict	Jean; 71% to evict	Ana Vitória; 54% to evict	Amanda; 54% to evict	Thomaz; 55% to evict	Fernanda; 58% to evict	Amanda; Ana Vitória; Fernanda; Jean Paulo; Victória	Gabriel; Thomaz	Gustavo; Pedro
Safe	Amanda; 13% to evict	Gustavo; 29% to evict	Thomaz; 46% to evict	Thomaz; 46% to evict	Gabriel; 45% to evict	Gustavo; 42% to evict	Thomaz; 32% to return	Raissa; 56% to win	
