= Dance Se Puder season 2 =

Dance Se Puder
- Season 2
- Hosted by: Eliana
- Judges: Jaime Arôxa; Ivan Santos; and celebrity guest judges
- No. of contestants: 8
- Winner: Kaik Pereira
- Runner-up: Lorena Tucci

Release
- Original network: SBT
- Original release: September 4 – October 23, 2016

Season chronology
- ← Previous; Season 1

The second season of Dance Se Puder (Dance If You Can), a Brazilian talent show, aired as a segment of Programa Eliana., premiered on September 4, 2016. Eight teen celebrities compete. They are presented to a panel usually consisting of three judges. Viewers can vote and evict one participant per round. Jaime Arôxa and Ivan Santos are back as regular judges. The winner will earn R$50,000.

== Format ==
This season has only eight contestants, two less than season one. Now they perform individually. Each contestant has to dance to a song chosen randomly and each has a week to prepare a dance performance. Each contestant receives a score on a scale from 0 to 10 by the three judges. The three scores are calculated. The lowest scoring participant is automatically up for elimination. A second person is chosen by the other participants to be in the bottom 2. The audience pick who they want to evict. The vote is set by text message.

== Contestants ==
| Contestant | 1 | 2 | 3 | 4 | 5 | 6 | 7 |
|---|---|---|---|---|---|---|---|
| Kaik; Pereira | HIGH | TOP | SAFE | TOP | TOP | | WINNER |
| Lorena; Tucci | TOP | HIGH | TOP | SAFE | BTM2 | | RUNNER UP |
| Cinthia; Cruz | SAFE | LOW | HIGH | HIGH | SAFE | | ELIM |
| Julia; Olliver | SAFE | SAFE | BTM2 | BTM2 | ELIM | SAFE | ELIM |
| Bianca; Paiva | SAFE | SAFE | SAFE | ELIM | | SAFE | ELIM |
| Léo; Belmonte | BTM2 | BTM2 | ELIM | | | OUT | GUEST |
| Matheus; Ueta | LOW | ELIM | | | | OUT | GUEST |
| Lívia; Inhudes | ELIM | | | | | OUT | GUEST |

The contestant won Dance Se Puder.
The contestant was the runner-up of Dance Se Puder.
The contestant was the second runner-up of Dance Se Puder.
The contestant had the highest score of the week.
The contestant had the second highest score of the week.
The contestant was one of the worst but was not in the bottom two.
The contestant was in the bottom two.
The contestant was eliminated.
The contestant won entry back into the competition.
The contestant didn't win entry back into the competition.
The contestant was voted as having the best performance of the season.
The contestant did not participate in this episode.

== Songs assigned ==
| CONTESTANT | ROUND 1 | ROUND 2 | ROUND 3 | ROUND 4 | ROUND 5 | ROUND 6 | FINAL |
|---|---|---|---|---|---|---|---|
| Kaik | "What Do You Mean?" (Justin Bieber) | "I Got You (I Feel Good)"; James Brown | "Beat It"; Michael Jackson | "The Power" (Snap!) | "O Bonde Passou" (MC Gui) | | "I Want You Back" (Jackson 5) |
| Lorena | "Na Batida" (Anitta) | "Chori Chori Gore Se" (Udit Narayan) | "Bad Romance" (Lady Gaga) | "Hung Up" (Madonna) | "We Found Love" (Rihanna & Calvin Harris) | | "Formation" (Beyoncé) |
| Cinthia | "Single Ladies (Put a Ring on It)" (Beyoncé) | "Ex Mai Love" (Gaby Amarantos) | "Man! I Feel Like A Woman" (Shania Twain) | "Work" (Rihanna & Drake) | "Cheap Thrills" (Sia) | | "Tombei" (Karol Conká & Tropkillaz) |
| Julia | "This Is What You Came For" (Calvin Harris & Rihanna) | "Problem" (Ariana Grande & Iggy Azalea) | "Run The World (Girls)" (Beyoncé) | "Mas Macarena" (Gente de Zona & Los Del Rio) | "Show das Poderosas" (Anitta) | "Bamboleo" (Gipsy Kings) | "I'm Out (Ciara) |
| Bianca | "All About That Bass" (Meghan Trainor) | "Waka Waka (This Time For Africa)" (Shakira) | "Work From Home" (Fifth Harmony & Ty Dolla Sign) | "Wannabe" (Spice Girls) | | "Good Feeling" (Flo Rida) | "Vogue" (Madonna) |
| Léo | "Mambo No.5" (Lou Bega) | "De Ladin" (Dream Team do Passinho) | "Kiss Kiss" (Chris Brown) | | | "Can't Stop the Feeling!" (Justin Timberlake) | |
| Matheus | "Hoje" (Ludmilla) | "Sexy and I Know It" (LMFAO) | | | | "Happy" (Pharrell Williams) | |
| Lívia | "California Gurls" (Katy Perry & Snoop Dogg) | | | | | "Berimbau Metalizado" (Ivete Sangalo) | |

Voted the best performance of the season by the audience.

== Scores ==
| Contestant | Round 1 | Round 2 | Round 3 | Round 4 | Round 5 |
|---|---|---|---|---|---|
| Cinthia; Cruz | 26,5 | 27,4 | 29 | 29,4 | 29,6 |
| Kaik; Pereira | 27 | 28,6 | 28,7 | 29,8 | 30 |
| Lorena; Tucci | 27,2 | 28,3 | 29,4 | 29,3 | 29,6 |
| Júlia; Oliver | 26,4 | 27,8 | 28,6 | 29,2 | 29,4 |
| Bianca; Paiva | 26,5 | 27,7 | 28,7 | 29 | |
| Léo; Belmonte | 25,9 | 27,1 | 28,5 | | |
| Matheus; Ueta | 26,3 | 27 | | | |
| Lívia; Inhudes | 25,9 | | | | |

== Nominations and audience's choice ==
| Contestants | Round 1 | Round 2 | Round 3 | Round 4 | Round 5 | Round 6 | Round 7 |
|---|---|---|---|---|---|---|---|
| Cinthia | — | Léo | — | Júlia | — | — | |
| Kaik | — | Léo | Júlia | Júlia | Lorena | — | |
| Lorena | — | — | Júlia | Júlia | — | — | |
| Júlia | — | — | BOTTOM 2 | BOTTOM 2 | Lorena | — | |
| Bianca | — | Léo | — | Júlia | Lorena | — | |
| Léo | BOTTOM 2 | Cinthia | Júlia | | | — | |
| Matheus | — | Léo | | | | — | |
| Lívia | BOTTOM 2 | | | | | — | |
| Eliminated | Lívia; 55% to evict | Matheus; 71% to evict | Léo; 76% to evict | Bianca; 51% to evict | Júlia; 50,07% to evict | Matheus; Lívia; Léo % not specified | Cinthia; Lorena % not specified |
| Safe | Léo; 45% to evict | Léo; 29% to evict | Júlia; 24% to evict | Júlia; 49% to evict | Lorena; 49,93% to evict | Bianca; Júlia % not specified | Kaik; 59% to win |

- "—" indicates the contestant didn't vote.
