= Talent show =

Event in which participants perform various arts

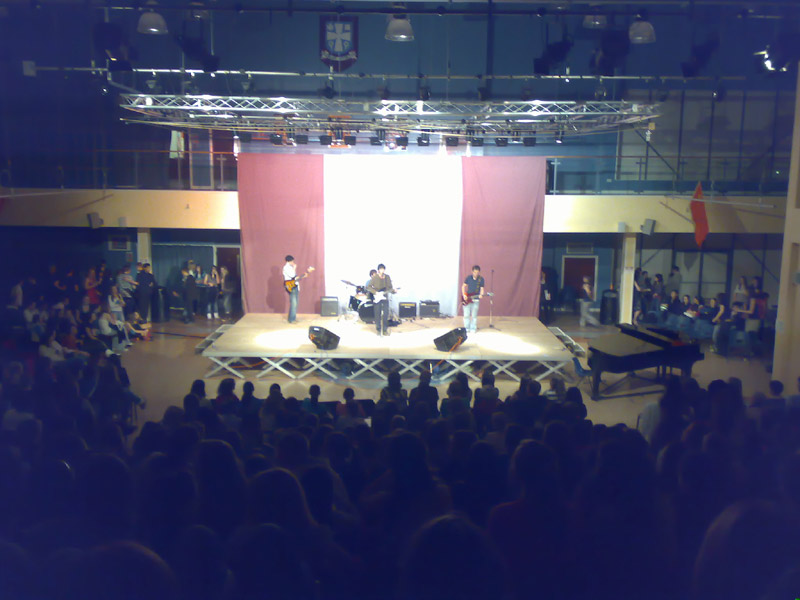
A school talent show taking place at St Ninian's High School in Glasgow, Scotland

A talent show or talent contest is an event in which participants perform the arts of singing, dancing, lip-syncing, acting, martial arts, playing an instrument, poetry, comedy or other activities to showcase skills. Many talent shows are performances rather than contests, but some are actual contests. In the instance of a contest, participants may be motivated to perform for a reward, trophy, or prize of some kind. For example, a high school might not have many students with any interest in performing in front of the student body for the sole purpose of performing alone and may offer different prizes as an incentive for these students to participate in the contest.

== Media ==
Since the late 1940s, talent shows have become a notable genre of reality television. Ever since the original airing of Doorway to Fame in 1947, countless spin-offs have been produced. In order of oldest to newest, here they are:

- Doorway to Fame (1947);
- The Original Amateur Hour (1948);
- Hollywood Screen Test (1948);
- Opportunity Knocks (1949);
- Chance of a Lifetime (1952);
- NHK Nodo Jiman (1953);
- New Faces (1963);
- Notun Kuri (1966);
- The Gong Show (1976);
- Star Search (1983);
- Soundmixshow (1985);
- Showtime at the Apollo (1987);
- Popstars (1999);
- Amici di Maria De Filippi (2001);
- Idol (2001);
- Star Academy (2001);
- Last Comic Standing (2003);
- Strictly Come Dancing (2004);
- The X Factor (2004);
- So You Think You Can Dance (2005);
- Dancing on Ice (2006);
- Got Talent (2006);
- How Do You Solve a Problem like Maria? (2006);
- Last Choir Standing (2008);
- The Sing-Off (2009);
- The Voice (2010);
- The Glee Project (2011);
- Q'Viva! The Chosen (2012);
- El Numero Uno (2012);
- Duets (2012);
- Top Talent (2013);
- Rising Star (2013);
- Tri Akkorda (2014);
- Masked Singer (2015);
- Little Big Shots (2016);
- Dance Se Puder (2016);
- Dance Dance Dance (2017);
- Let It Shine (2017);
- World of Dance (2017);
- The Four: Battle for Stardom (2018);
- All Together Now (2018);
- The World's Best (2019);
- Asre Jadid (2019);
- Bring The Funny (2019);
- Your Moment (2019);
- Go-Big Show (2021).

All of these spin-offs have been critical in catapulting amateur artists to stardom and resulting in their commercially successful careers.

== Non-competitive talent shows for troubled youths ==
Talent shows can be seen as a way to help boost the self-esteem, confidence, and assurance of youth. Some communities and companies see talent shows as a way to help prevent juvenile delinquency among children, teens, and young adults. As a result, these communities create programs such as Girls Only! in San Diego to promote the growth of these otherwise trouble youth to better the community. Such programs are created with the hope to prevent youth from the possibilities of entering delinquency or lives of crime.
