= Key Alves =

Brazilian volleyball player (born 2000)

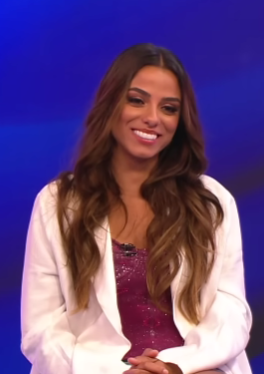

Keyla Alves Ramalho (born January 8, 2000), better known as Key Alves, is a Brazilian volleyball female player, model and businesswoman. She plays as a libero and her current club is the LOVB Houston branch of LOVB Pro of the United States, previously played at Club Osasco of Serie A Women's Volleyball from Brazil.

== Biography ==
She was born in São Paulo, Brazil. Her father is a businessman and her mother is a housewife; she has a twin sister named Keyt Alves, and an elder sister. She is Catholic.

== Professional career ==
Alves began her career as a volleyball player at a very early age, playing as a member of her school's women's team and participating in numerous regional tournaments. For her performance there, she was followed by numerous volleyball clubs and was eventually signed by the Associação Vôlei team. She later left the team and was signed by the Esporte Clube Pinheiros team for the 2021–22 season of the first division volleyball championship.

In the second half of 2021, she joined Club Osasco for three seasons. She is also a former Brazilian volleyball player.

She is one of the most followed athletes in the world with more than two million followers on Instagram and also on OnlyFans.

On June 23, 2023, through her social networks, she has announced her retirement from professional volleyball, after almost nine years of her career, to dedicate herself to entertainment for her fans. However, in 2024, to compete in the American Volleyball League for the LOVB Houston Volleyball team, she underwent anterior cruciate ligament reconstruction surgery

Keyla was also a participant in the twenty-third season of Big Brother Brasil on the "Camarote" team, which is made up of famous personalities from the country.

== Personal life ==
In 2023, during her participation in Big Brother Brasil, Key had a brief relationship with fellow reality participant Gustavo Benedeti, ending shortly after leaving the program. Alves revealed that she is sapiosexual.

== Achievements ==
- 2018 Women's Junior South American Volleyball Championship – Champion, with Brazil women's national volleyball team
