= Bruna Griphao =

Brazilian actress

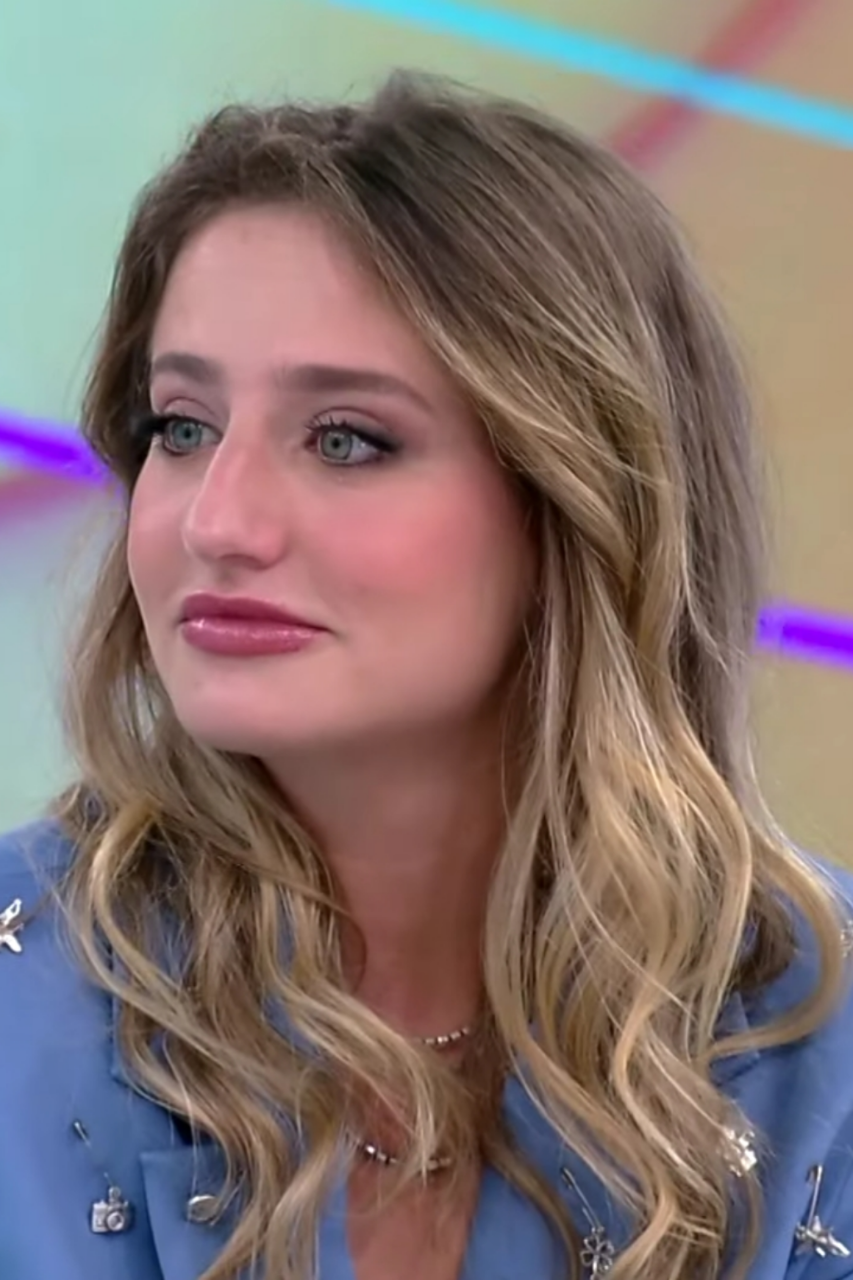
- Griphao in 2023
- Born: Bruna Grigoriadis Orphao; March 10, 1999 (age 27); Rio de Janeiro, Brazil
- Occupation: Actress
- Years active: 2008–present
- Height: 1.57 m (5 ft 2 in)

Bruna Grigoriadis Orphao (born March 10, 1999), best known as Bruna Griphao (Portuguese: [ˈbɾunɐ ɡɾiˈfau]), is a Brazilian actress, singer, and model. She was born and raised in Rio de Janeiro, Brazil. Griphao is fluent in Portuguese, and Greek. Her maternal grandparents are from Greece and Chile.

== Personal life ==
In Big Brother Brasil 23, Bruna came out as heteroromantic bisexual and demisexual.

== Filmography ==
=== Television ===
Year	Title	Role
2009	Bela, a Feia	Aninha
2012	Avenida Brasil	Paloma Bragança de Queirós
2013	Malhação	Giovana Rocha
2016	Haja Coração	Carolina Talarico
2017	Sob Pressão	Michele
2018	Orgulho e Paixão	Lydia Bennet
2021	Nos Tempos do Imperador	Leopoldina
2023	Big Brother Brasil 23	Herself

=== Film ===
Year	Title	Role
2014	Confissões de Adolescente	Bruna
2014	Muitos Homens em Um Só	Maria
2016	É Fada!	Verônica
2017	A Glória e a Graça	Mariana
2020	Rich in Love	Raissa
