= Joscius =

Joscius (French: Josce or Josse) may refer to:

- Joscius (archbishop of Tours), died 1173
- Joscius (archbishop of Tyre), died 1202
