= Julie e os Fantasmas =

Brazilian musical comedy-drama television series (2011–2012)

- Also known as: Julie and the Phantoms
- Genre: Comedy drama; Musical
- Created by: Paula Knudsen; Tiago Mello; Fabio Danesi
- Directed by: Luís Pinheiro; Luíza Campos; Julia Jordão; Luca Paiva Mello; Michel Tikhomiroff
- Starring: Mariana Lessa; Bruno Sigrist; Fabio Rabello; Marcelo Ferrari; Samya Pascotto; Milena Martines; Vinícius Mazzola; Michel Joelsas
- Opening theme: "Julie" by Lu Andrade
- Composer: Rick Bonadio
- Country of origin: Brazil
- Original language: Portuguese
- No. of seasons: 1
- No. of episodes: 26

Production
- Producers: Tiago Mello; Juliana Capelini; João Daniel Tikhomiroff
- Camera setup: Multi-camera
- Running time: 24 minutes
- Production company: Mixer

Original release
- Network: Band
- Release: 17 October 2011 – 4 May 2012
- Network: Nickelodeon Brazil
- Release: 20 October 2011 – 29 April 2012

Related
- Julie and the Phantoms

Julie e os Fantasmas (English title: Julie and the Phantoms) is a Brazilian musical comedy-drama television series produced by Rede Bandeirantes in partnership with Mixer and co-producer Nickelodeon Brazil. The show aired on Rede Bandeirantes from 17 October 2011 to 4 May 2012. It also aired on Nickelodeon from 20 October 2011 to 29 April 2012, with the season divided into two distinct phases: the first one, shown in 2011, and the second shown the following year.

The series stars Mariana Lessa as Julie, a teenage girl who meets three ghosts: Daniel, Felix, and Martim (played by Bruno Sigrist, Fabio Rabello, and Marcelo Ferrari, respectively). Julie subsequently forms a band with the ghosts and starts to perform regularly in her city.

The opening theme of the series, "Julie", is performed by Lu Andrade. The song was included on a CD released on 30 April 2012 by Midas Music, a label owned by Rick Bonadio, who was in charge of the musical production. During its Band broadcast, the series achieved an audience of approximately three points, an index considered good by network standards, and was well-received by critics.

The show received an APCA Trophy in the category Best Children's Program and was nominated for the Kids' Choice Awards (Argentine edition), My Nick Awards, and the International Emmy Kids Awards. In addition to being shown in its home country, the series was shown across Latin America through the Nickelodeon affiliates, and in Italy on the Super! Channel.

== Synopsis ==
The show focuses on Julie (Mariana Lessa), a 15-year-old girl, and three ghosts: Daniel, Felix and Martim. Julie frees the musical ghosts who were trapped in a vinyl record. Shortly thereafter, Julie's life changes completely: she forms a band with the ghosts and starts performing regularly in her city. The friendly ghosts help her deal with daily problems, particularly her passion for music and her love for Nicolas.

== Cast and characters ==
=== Main ===
- Mariana Lessa as Juliana "Julie" Spinelli
- Bruno Sigrist as Daniel Haunt
- Fabio Rabello as Félix Haunt
- Marcelo Ferrari as Martim Haunt
- Samya Pascotto as Beatriz "Bia" Passos
- Milena Martines as Thalita Bittencourt de Toledo
- Vinícius Mazzola as Pedro "Pedrinho" Spinelli
- Michel Joelsas as Nicolas Albuquerque

=== Recurring ===
- Will Prado as Raul Spinelli, Julie's father
- Camila Raffanti as Eloísa Spinelli, Julie's mother
- Gabriel Falcão as João Paulo "JP" Guimarães
- Pedro Lucas Cruz as Thomaz Mota
- Pedro Inoue as Valter "Valtinho" Gama
- Jéssica Nakamura as Shizuko Yamada
- Netuno Trindade as Patrick

=== Guest ===
- Bruno Gissoni as Caco
- Manu Gavassi as Débora
- Gabi Lopes as Roberta
- Penélope Nova as Prof. Marta Sousa
- NX Zero as themselves
- Kiko Zambianchi as Josias
- Roger Moreira as Chris Garcia
- Reinaldo Zavarce as himself
- Mariana Gimenez as Valeria

== Episodes ==
No.	Title	Directed by	Written by	Band airdate	Nickelodeon air date
1	"Minha Vida" "My Life"	Luis Pinheiro	Story by : Daniela Garuti, Ricardo Tiezzi & Mariana Veríssimo; Teleplay by : Fabio Danesi	17 October 2011	20 October 2011
2	"Mochila" "Bag"	Luis Pinheiro	Story by : Daniela Garuti, Ricardo Tiezzi & Mariana Veríssimo; Teleplay by : Fabio Danesi & Ricardo Tiezzi	24 October 2011	27 October 2011
3	"Para sempre nós" "Forever Us"	Luis Pinheiro	Story by : Fabio Danesi, Daniela Garuti & Ricardo Tiezzi; Teleplay by : Ricardo Tiezzi	31 October 2011	3 November 2011
4	"Daniel, Martim, Félix" "Daniel, Martim, Félix"	Luis Pinheiro	Story by : Fabio Danesi, Daniela Garuti & Ricardo Tiezzi; Teleplay by : Cássio Koshikumo	7 November 2011	10 November 2011
5	"Os Insólitos" "The Unusual"	Luiza Campos	Unknown	14 November 2011	17 November 2011
6	"De Salto Alto" "In High Heels"	Luiza Campos	Story by : Fabio Danesi, Daniela Garuti & Ricardo Tiezzi; Teleplay by : Daniela Garuti	21 November 2011	24 November 2011
7	"O Primeiro Clipe" "The First Clip"	Luiza Campos	Story by : Fabio Danesi, Daniela Garuti & Ricardo Tiezzi; Teleplay by : Marcelo Montenegro	28 November 2011	1 December 2011
8	"O Primeiro Show" "The First Show"	Unknown	Unknown	5 December 2011	8 December 2011
9	"Você não Sabe" "You Do Not Know"	Luiza Campos	Story by : Fabio Danesi, Daniela Garuti & Ricardo Tiezzi; Teleplay by : Fabio Danesi & Daniela Garuti	12 December 2011	15 December 2011
10	"NXZero" "NXZero"	Júlia Jordão	Story by : Fabio Danesi, Daniela Garuti & Ricardo Tiezzi; Teleplay by : Cássio Koshikumo & Ricardo Tiezzi	19 December 2011	22 December 2011
11	"A Melhor Aluna da Classe" "Best Student in Class"	Júlia Jordão	Story by : Fabio Danesi, Daniela Garuti & Ricardo Tiezzi; Teleplay by : Fabio Danesi & Ricardo Tiezzi	11 April 2012	18 March 2012
12	"Reação Química" "Chemical Reaction"	Júlia Jordão	Story by : Fabio Danesi, Daniela Garuti & Ricardo Tiezzi; Teleplay by : Fabio Danesi & Daniela Garuti	12 April 2012	25 March 2012
13	"O Caça Fantasmas - parte 1" "Phantom Hunt - Part 1"	Júlia Jordão	Story by : Fabio Danesi, Daniela Garuti & Ricardo Tiezzi; Teleplay by : Cássio Koshikumo	13 April 2012	1 April 2012
14	"O Caça Fantasmas - parte 2" "Phantom Hunt - Part 2"	Júlia Jordão	Story by : Fabio Danesi, Daniela Garuti & Ricardo Tiezzi; Teleplay by : Cássio Koshikumo	16 April 2012	7 April 2012
15	"JP - parte 1" "JP - Part 1"	Marcela Lordy	Story by : Fabio Danesi & Daniela Garuti; Teleplay by : Fabio Danesi, Cássio Koshikumo & Marcelo Montenegro & Ricardo Tiezzi	17 April 2012	7 April 2012
16	"JP - parte 2" "JP - Part 2"	Marcela Lordy	Story by : Fabio Danesi, Daniela Garuti & Ricardo Tiezzi; Teleplay by : Fabio Danesi, Cássio Koshikumo & Marcelo Montenegro	19 April 2012	8 April 2012
17	"O Guardião da Floresta Negra" "The Black Forest Guardian"	Marcela Lordy	Story by : Fabio Danesi, Daniela Garuti & Ricardo Tiezzi; Teleplay by : Fabio Danesi & Marcelo Montenegro	20 April 2012	8 April 2012
18	"O Último Show" "The Last Show"	Marcela Lordy	Story by : Fabio Danesi, Daniela Garuti & Ricardo Tiezzi; Teleplay by : Daniela Garuti & Cássio Koshikumo	23 April 2012	14 April 2012
19	"A Mãe de Julie" "Julie's Mother"	Marcela Lordy	Story by : Fabio Danesi, Cássio Koshikumo & Ricardo Tiezzi; Teleplay by : Cássio Koshikumo & Marcelo Montenegro	25 April 2012	14 April 2012
20	"A Nova Música" "The New Music"	Júlia Jordão	Story by : Fabio Danesi, Cássio Koshikumo & Ricardo Tiezzi; Teleplay by : Cássio Koshikumo	26 April 2012	15 April 2012
21	"Melhores Amigas" "Best Friends"	Júlia Jordão	Story by : Fabio Danesi, Cássio Koshikumo & Ricardo Tiezzi; Teleplay by : Ricardo Tiezzi	27 April 2012	15 April 2012
22	"Festival" "Festival"	Júlia Jordão	Story by : Fabio Danesi & Ricardo Tiezzi; Teleplay by : Fabio Danesi, Cássio Koshikumo & Marcelo Montenegro	30 April 2012	21 April 2012
23	"A Grande Chance" "The Great Chance"	Júlia Jordão	Story by : Fabio Danesi, Cássio Koshikumo & Ricardo Tiezzi; Teleplay by : Cássio Koshikumo	1 May 2012	21 April 2012
24	"Halloween" "Halloween"	Júlia Jordão	Story by : Fabio Danesi, Cássio Koshikumo & Ricardo Tiezzi; Teleplay by : Fabio Danesi & Cássio Koshikumo	2 May 2012	29 April 2012
25	"A Verdade" "The Truth"	Júlia Jordão	Story by : Fabio Danesi & Ricardo Tiezzi; Teleplay by : Fabio Danesi, Cássio Koshikumo & Marcelo Montenegro	3 May 2012	29 April 2012
26	"Guerra é Guerra" "War is War"	Júlia Jordão	Story by : Fabio Danesi, Cássio Koshikumo & Ricardo Tiezzi; Teleplay by : Cássio Koshikumo	4 May 2012	29 April 2012

== Awards ==
Year	Award	Category	Nominee	Result
2011	Troféu APCA	Best Juvenile Show	Julie e os Fantasmas	Won
2012	Nickelodeon Kids' Choice Awards	Brazilian Artist Favorite	Julie e os Fantasmas	Nominated
2012	Nickelodeon Kids' Choice Awards Argentina	Favorite TV Show	Julie e os Fantasmas	Nominated
2012	Meus Prêmios Nick	Favorite TV Show	Julie e os Fantasmas	Nominated
2012	Meus Prêmios Nick	Favorite Actress	Mariana Lessa	Nominated
2012	Meus Prêmios Nick	Singer Favorite	Mariana Lessa	Nominated
2013	Emmy Kids Awards	Youth series	Julie e os Fantasmas	Nominated
