= Lu Andrade =

Brazilian singer, songwriter, and actress

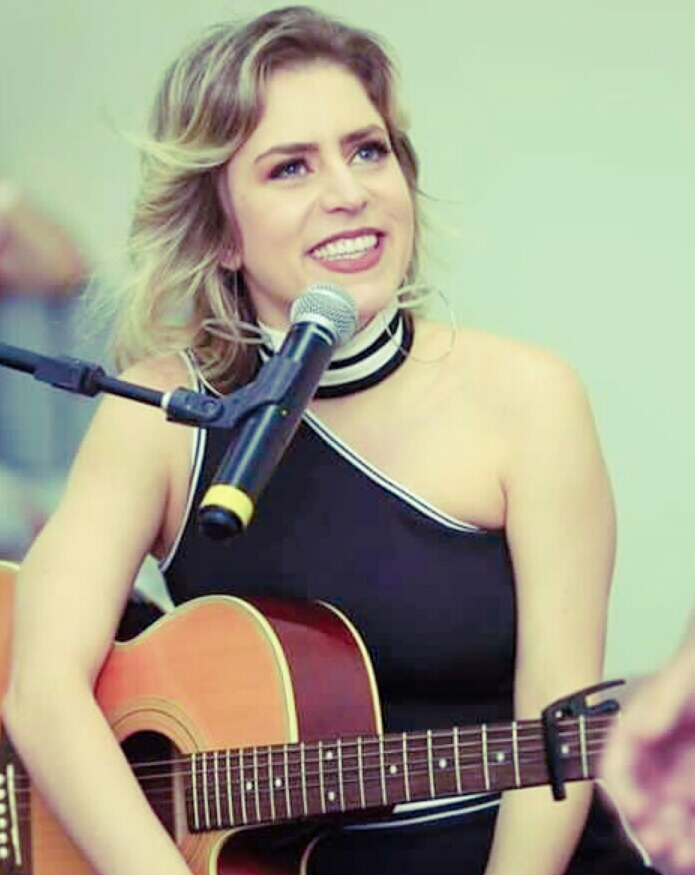
- Andrade in 2019
- Born: Luciana de Andrade; 18 September 1978 (age 48); Varginha, Minas Gerais, Brazil
- Occupations: Singer; songwriter; television personality
- Spouse: Leonardo Pereira (m. 2003; div. 2018)
- Musical career
- Genres: Folk rock; indie pop
- Instruments: Vocals; guitar; piano
- Years active: 2002–present
- Labels: Columbia; Sony BMG

Luciana de Andrade (born 18 September 1978) is a Brazilian singer, songwriter and actress. In 2002, she won the talent show Popstars and joined the Brazilian girl group Rouge, recording two of the band's first four studio albums, Rouge (2002) and C'est La Vie (2003). With over 6 million records sold, the Rouge are the best-selling Brazilian female group of all time. In 2004, Andrade left the band citing exhaustion and creative differences but rejoined when they reunited for a fifth studio album, Les 5inq (2019) and concert tour called 15 Anos Tour (2018).

In 2004, after leaving the group, Andrade returned to her parents' home in Varginha, where she remained for some months without giving any statements to the press. In 2005 she returned to São Paulo to study music and to improve her musical ideology, working like vocal of support for Negra Li, Nasi, Theft, Forgotten Boys and Sérgio Britto, besides the American Eric Silver. In 2007, Andrade was invited to become a reporter for the Show Total program, the TVA subscription channel, where she remained until 2009. In 2010 she made her theatrical debut in the theater musical Into The Woods, a Brazilian version of the Broadway classic. In 2012 she released her second tour album, titled Tour O Amor e o Tempo. and her first single, "Mind and Heart", followed by a second, "Amanheceu", in 2014. In 2015 she formed the Duo Elétrico project along with guitarist Ciro Visconti, playing several covers of rock bands, besides becoming vocalist of the return of the band Aries in a commemorative tour of 25 years. In 2016, conciliating with the works in the music, she became the presenter of the program Estúdio Acesso Cultural, exhibited online, in addition to becoming a singing instructor in the Souza Lima Conservatory, where she had studied music 15 years earlier.

== Biography ==
Born on September 18, 1978, Andrade is a native of Varginha, Minas Gerais, and daughter of Walter Andrade and Clair Andrade, and her brothers Guilherme, Gustavo and Lidiane. From childhood she had a passion for music, improvising small shows for her family on a stage in the basement of her house. In 1984, at the age of 5, she sang for the first time in public in a tribute to Mother's Day, and from then on she performed at all the festivals held at her school. Soon after, she became a choir member at her church, and was also invited to interpret the National Anthem in cities of Minas Gerais. As a teenager, she formed her first pop rock band called Trem de Minas, while also working at an English school and as a trainee in a local television network. In 1999, at the age of 20, she began to compose her own songs, and in the same year she went to the advertising school, where she attended until the sixth semester before leaving and moving to São Paulo to study music, earning a scholarship of the Souza Lima Conservatory.

== Career ==
=== 2002-04: Career with Rouge ===
In 2002, a friend of Andrade saw a commercial promoting the talent show Popstars and encouraged her to sign up by sending her audition video. Selected from 30,000 applications, Andrade went straight to the second phase of the program, where more than 6,000 were classified in the Anhembi Sambadrome of São Paulo where they performed song evaluation. The following phases were increasingly demanding. After 5 qualifying rounds, only 8 contestants were classified for the final stage that took place at the home of the Popstars. After the 6th and final eliminatory round, the Brazilian girl group was finally formed by Andrade, Li Martins, Aline Wirley, Karin Hils and Fantine Thó. The first studio album, Rouge, was released in the same year. It reached number one on the charts, selling around 2 million copies and receiving Diamond certification The album's Lead single was "Não Dá para Resistir", followed by "Ragatanga", featuring Spanish girl group Las Ketchup, in addition to "Beijo Molhado" and "Nunca Deixe de Sonhar," The group also released a remix album titled Rouge Remixes. This latter album was certified Gold after selling 150 thousand copies. A video album titled O Sonho de Ser Uma Popstar was released in 2002.

"All girls have gone through difficult times, you know. We even talked about whether we wanted to fight for better working conditions, for more justice there. They all said they wanted to, and in the end they gave up and chose to continue. And I don't. It was really bad for my health. There are cases that I have never told and that I will not tell either, because they are too heavy. I experienced extremely difficult things. Today I know it was mobbing. At that time, this was not discussed by society".

— Andrade revealed in interview in 2021 her true decision to leave Rouge.

In 2003 the group released their second album, C'est La Vie, selling around 100,000 copies in the first week of release and around 1 million copies in total, with singles "Brilha La Luna", "Um Anjo Veio Me Falar" and "Vem Cair na Zueira". On December 3 of the same year they released their second live concert album on DVD, titled A Festa dos Seus Sonhos. On February 11, 2004, Andrade announced her departure from Rouge through a press conference. The singer cited exhaustion and disillusionment as her reasons for leaving. Rumours of a power struggle with Thó circulated in the press. She revealed, in an interview years later, that her departure was due to bullying from management and low pay. The other members said that her departure had a positive effect because it made them reevaluate their careers. A Spanish language album was in the works to be released in Latin America, but with Andrade's departure, the project was canceled.

=== 2004-10: Participations, television and theater ===
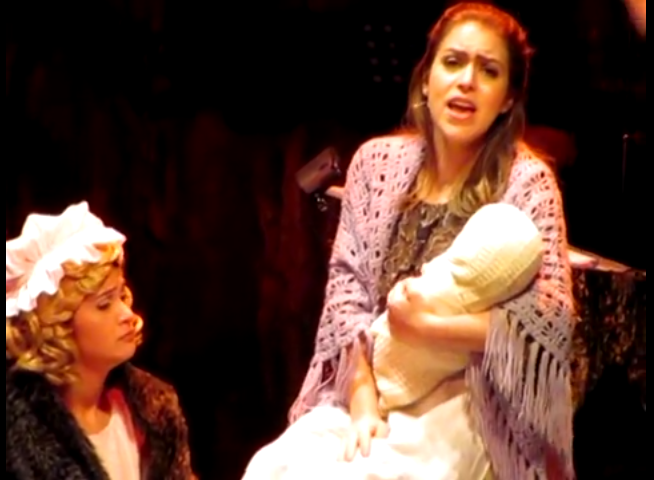
Lu on musical theatre Into The Woods, 2010.

In 2004, after leaving the group, Andrade returned to the parents' home in Varginha, Minas Gerais, where she remained a few months withdrawn, without giving statements to the press. In the same year she recorded a special participation in the album Trova di Danú, of the folk band Tuatha de Danann, putting the vocals in the track "A Song Of Oengus". In 2005, despite not intending to release solo material, she returned to São Paulo to study music and improve her musical ideology in works with other artists, recording the supporting vocals of Sangueaudiência and Stand By The Dance albums of the bands Furto and Forgotten Boys, respectively. In 2006 also records the backing vocals in Negra Livre and Onde Os Anjos Não Ousam Pisar, albums of Negra Li and the vocalista of Ira!, Nasi. In the same year she joined Sérgio Britto's band, a member of the Titãs, traveling throughout Brazil with the Tour Eu Sou 300. Soon after also embarked as backing vocal also of the tour of the American singer Eric Silver. In 2007 Andrade was invited to become a reporter for the Show Total program, the TVA subscription channel. The invitation came after she was interviewed by him and won the interest of the team, staying in the interview reports for two years.

On May 25, 2007, her first tour, titled Luciana Andrade Pocket Show, premiered at the Souza Lima Conservatory of Music in São Paulo. The show was totally acoustic, with only Andrade on stage, and the repertoire included versions of other artists such as Skank, Kid Abelha and Lulu Santos, as well as unreleased songs of her own, such as "Outra História", "Sempre" and "De Longe". At the time, Andrade announced that her first album would be released in the second half of that year, with production by Briton Paul Ralphes: "There are a lot of partnerships and other people's compositions, I think there's a lot of good music to be recorded. to make an album of only my compositions. The launch forecast is for the second half of this year." The album, however, was never released and the songs were not available anywhere. In 2010 Andrade invested in a career as a theater actress, starring in the musical theatre Into The Woods, directed by Armando Bravi Filho and Felipe Senna, a Brazilian version of the Broadway classic, where she played Cinderella. While working on this, in the same year, she was part of the band of Ciro Pessoa, a member of Titãs, where she was for some time a backing vocalist.

=== 2010-present: Musical releases and internet ===
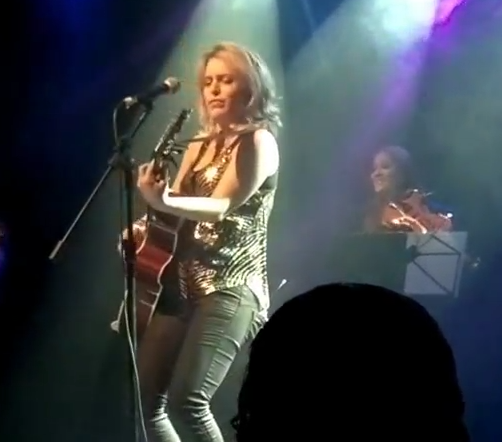
Lu on tour O Amor e o Tempo on Rio de Janeiro, Brazil, in 2013.

On November 21, 2010, Andrade launched an eponymous digital extended play (EP), directly on social media. It features four tracks - "Tão Diferente", "De Longe", "A Casa Mal-Assombrada" and "Outra História", as well as acoustic version of "De Longe", being a selection of songs recorded for her first album. In the same year she recorded the opening theme of the series Julie e os Fantasmas, of the Network Bandeirantes, that would become part of the soundtrack released next year. In 2012 Andrade was asked by the press about Rouge's return campaign, and she said that she would like to do a new job with the other members, provided it was something more mature, without choreography: "I would like to meet the girls, sing a new song or record the Shakira version we wrote together, I think it's a great idea to do something unique and new." On September 20, she premiered her new tour, the O Amor e o Tempo Tour, at the Café Paon show in São Paulo. The tour brought a repertoire focused on unreleased songs and reverted versions for the folk genre, as well as a band of their own, Fabio Russo on guitar, Jhonny Maia on bass and Léo Baeta on drums.

On December 24, 2012, Andrade released her first official single, "Mind and Heart", which received promotion in several television programs, including TV Gazeta, Leão Lobo Visita and Jornal da Record News, besides the Brasil Ideal and Tá Ligado, of broadcasters in the interior of São Paulo. On May 5, 2014, she released her second single, "Amanheceu", a tribute to her late father. In 2015 she joined drummer André Pinguim of Charlie Brown Jr. to reformulate the band Aries, becoming a vocalist during the new tour after a long hiatus, reconciling the shows with the band with her solo work. At the same time she launched her third tour, the Acoustic Tour. Soon after also she formed the Electric Duo along with the guitarist Ciro Visconti, playing covers of bands of rock and own compositions in diverse shows. On July 25, 2016, she became a presenter of the "Estúdio Acesso Cultural" program, directly on the Internet, interviewing artists and proposing duets of different styles, as well as becoming a singing instructor at the Souza Lima Conservatory, where she studied music 15 years earlier.

== Personal life ==
Luciana began dating the photographer Leonardo Pereira in 1998, at age 19, when the two still lived in Varginha. In 1999 she began to study advertising in the University Center of the South of Minas (UNIS), leaving in the sixth semester. In 2001 decided to move to São Paulo along with her boyfriend to study music, gaining a full scholarship in the Conservatory Souza Lima and going to live in a republic with ten other musicians. In 2003 she married Leonardo in a ceremony only civil and away from the media coverage, having only a few guests. In 2004 she became godmother of the Cultural Artistic Festival, in Varginha, which aims to discover young talents among students of the city, directing them to studies focused on the arts, being one of the jurors annually. In 2013 participated in the campaign Leukemia Tem Healing, which encourages the donation of blood and bone marrow.

== Musical characteristics ==
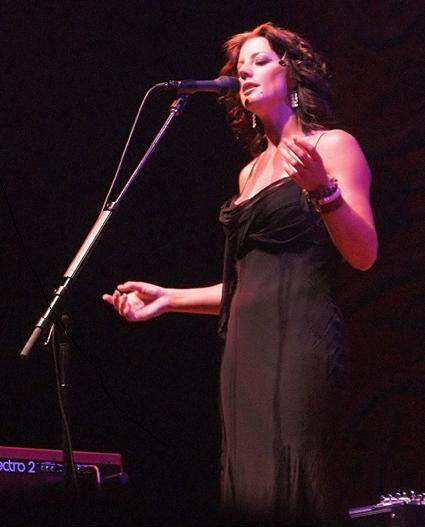
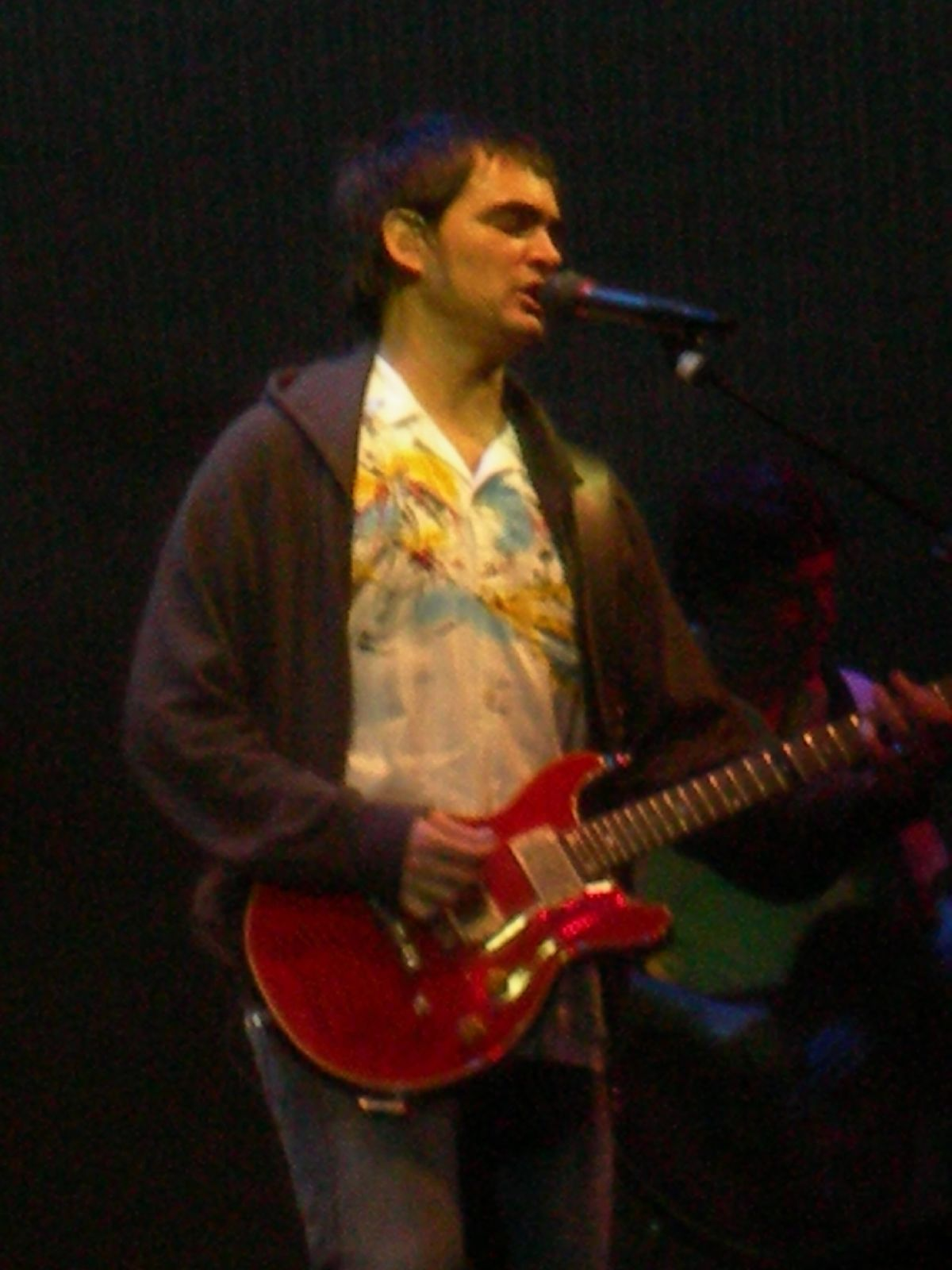
Canadian singer Sarah McLachlan and Brazilian band Skank were cited as two of their biggest influences.

During her adolescence she had inspirations from diverse artists like Lô Borges, Flávio Venturini and 14 Bis, besides other great Brazilian names like Lulu Santos, Kid Abelha and Pato Fu. According to Luciana herself, the greatest reference for her throughout her career was the Canadian singer Sarah McLachlan, emphasizing that she always wanted to make a sound between pop rock and soft rock: "My style was always Sarah's. I came to São Paulo wanting to make a sound similar to hers." She also stated that she has added musical content from singers Arnaldo Antunes, Erasmo Carlos, Rita Lee, Marisa Monte and Ciro Pessoa. During her time on Popstars, she cited Elis Regina, Djavan and Ed Motta as references for her work. Among international names also mentioned by her were Lara Fabian, Celine Dion, Chrissie Hynde, Marie Fredriksson, The Beatles, as well as the solo careers of John Lennon and Paul McCartney.

The Minas Gerais bands Skank and Jota Quest were reinforced as two of their greatest influences. In 2011, Luciana stated in an interview with Popline that the greatest reference to her solo career were folk and indie pop music, introducing artists like Neil Young, Joni Mitchell, Patti Smith and Nick Drake to the ones she had heard most.

== Discography ==
=== Extended plays ===
Album	Details
Luciana Andrade	Release date: November 21, 2010; Formats: Digital download; Label: Independent
Lu Andrade – Ao Vivo no Estúdio Showlivre	Release date: May 13, 2013; Formats: Digital download; Label: Independent

=== Singles ===
Title	Year	Album
"Mind and Heart"	2012	Non-album single
"Amanheceu"	2014	Non-album single
"Eu Acho Que Te Adoro"	2021	Non-album single

=== Other appearances ===
Title	Year	Other artist (s)	Album
"De Danann's Voice"	2004	Tuatha de Danann	Trova di Danú
"Julie e os Fantasmas"	2012	Non-album single	Julie e os Fantasmas

=== Music videos ===
Title	Year	Director
"Mind and Heart"	2013	João Parisi
"Amanheceu"	2014	Danilo Mori

== Filmography ==
Year	TV show	Role	Notes
2002	Popstars	Contestant (Won)	Season 1
2002	Rouge: A História	Presenter	
2003	Romeu e Julieta	Friend of Julieta	Year end special
2007–09	Show Total	Reporter	
2013	Fábrica de Estrelas	Herself	Episode: "The Return of the Rouge"

Internet
Year	Title	Character	Note
2016–17	Estúdio Acesso Cultural	Presenter	Talk show

=== Films ===
Year	Film	Character
2003	Xuxa Abracadabra	Herself

== Theatre appearances ==
Year	Production	Role
2010–11	Into The Woods	Cinderela

== Tours ==
Officials

- Luciana Andrade Pocket Show (2007–10)
- O Amor e o Tempo Tour (2012–14)
- Acoustic Tour (2015)
- Duo Elétrico (with the Ciro Visconti) (2015–2017)

With the Áries band

- O Retorno de Áries (2015–17)
