= Ao Vivo no Estúdio Showlivre =

EP by Luciana Andrade
- Released: 13 May 2013
- Recorded: 2013
- Genres: Folk rock; indie pop
- Length: 29:45
- Languages: Portuguese; English
- Label: Independent

Luciana Andrade chronology
Luciana Andrade (2010)	Ao Vivo no Estúdio Showlivre (2013)

Singles from Lu Andrade – Ao Vivo no Estúdio Showlivre
- 1. "Mind and Heart" Released: 24 December 2012

Ao Vivo no Estúdio Showlivre is the second EP by Brazilian singer Luciana Andrade. It was released on May 13, 2013, on her official website, and includes the first official single of her solo career, "Mind and Heart".

== Track listing ==
No.	Title	Length
1.	"A Casa Mal Assombrada"	3:44
2.	"De Longe"	3:20
3.	"Sempre"	3:39
4.	"Mind and Heart"	4:31
5.	"Tão Diferente"	4:01
6.	"Não Sei Deixar Você ir"	3:11
7.	"O Amor e o Tempo"	3:41
8.	"Mistério Oral"	3:38
Total length:		14:03
