= Jean-Baptiste de Caffarelli du Falga =

French bishop, French churchman

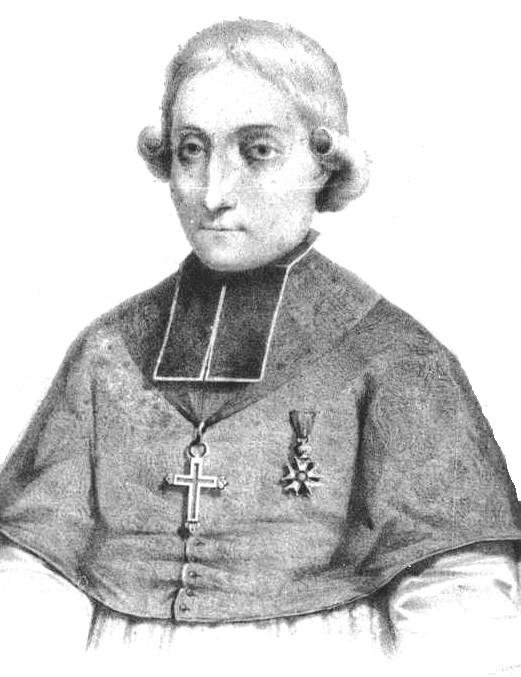
Jean-Baptiste de Caffarelli du Falga, French churchman

Jean-Baptiste de Caffarelli du Falga (1 April 1763 at château du Falga – 11 January 1815) was a French churchman from a noble family with origins in Ferrara who had come to France during the reign of Louis XIII in the train of the Papal Nuncio, Bishop Guido Bentivoglio.

== Biography ==
One of his ancestors had collaborated in building the Canal Royal du Languedoc (Canal du Midi) under Riquet and had acquired the land of Falga that Jean-Baptiste came to inhabit in 1786. The fourth of the six Caffarelli brothers (who also had 4 sisters), he was ordained priest at 20, as canon of the cathedral at Montpellier.

Upon the French Revolution, he fled to Spain, returning to France in 1798 to live at the house of his brother Louis-Marie-Joseph, préfet maritime of Brest. Consecrated concordataire-bishop of Saint Brieuc on 1 May 1802, Saint Brioc day, he was bishop for 13 years, and in 1811 objected to Napoleon's schismatic pretensions. He ordained the comte de Quelen as a priest, who later became archbishop of Paris and conferred the priesthood on Lacordaire.

He was a chevalier of the Légion d'Honneur and a baron d'Empire.
