= William Pinchon =

French Roman Catholic saint

Saint Guillaume Pinchon
- Bishop of Saint-Brieuc
- Church: Roman Catholic Church
- Diocese: Saint-Brieuc
- See: Saint-Brieuc
- Appointed: 1220
- Term ended: 29 July 1234
- Predecessor: Sylvestre
- Successor: Philippe

Orders
- Ordination: 1202 to 1206 by Josselin
- Consecration: c. 1220

Personal details
- Born: Guillaume Pinchon c. 1175 Saint-Alban, Brittany
- Died: 29 July 1234 (aged 59) Saint-Brieuc, Brittany

Sainthood
- Feast day: 29 July
- Venerated in: Roman Catholic Church
- Canonized: 24 March 1247 by Pope Innocent IV
- Attributes: Episcopal attire
- Patronage: Diocese of Saint-Brieuc

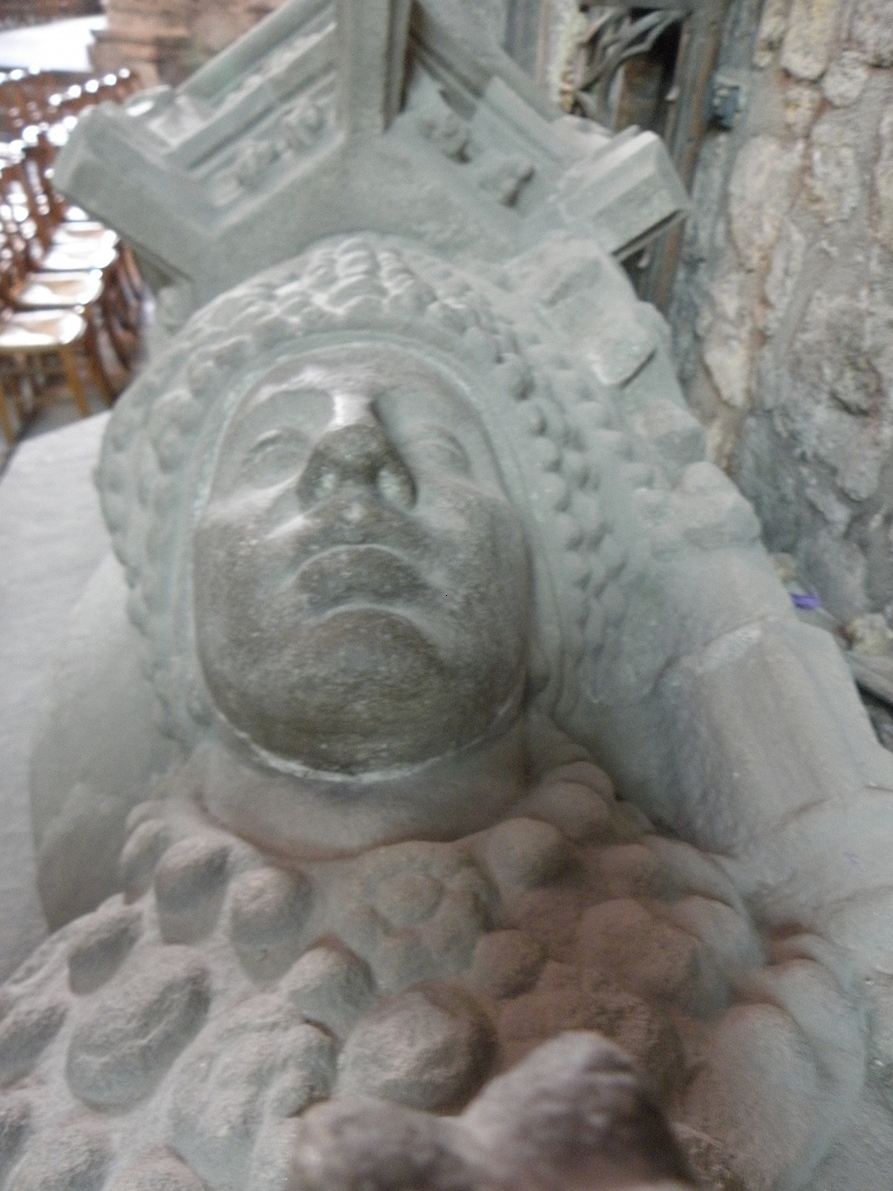
Detail of the tomb of Saint-Guillaume Pinchon, Bishop of Saint-Brieuc (1220-1224), in Saint-Étienne Cathedral in Saint-Brieuc (22).

Guillaume Pinchon (c. 1175 – 29 July 1234) was a French Catholic prelate who served as the Bishop of Saint-Brieuc from his appointment in 1220 until his death. He was a champion for the poor and defended the rights and privileges of the Church against secular intervention though this was a cause for his exile from his diocese. He returned not long after his exile and set himself on the construction of a new cathedral which was still in construction at the time he died.

His canonization was celebrated on 24 March 1247.

== Life ==
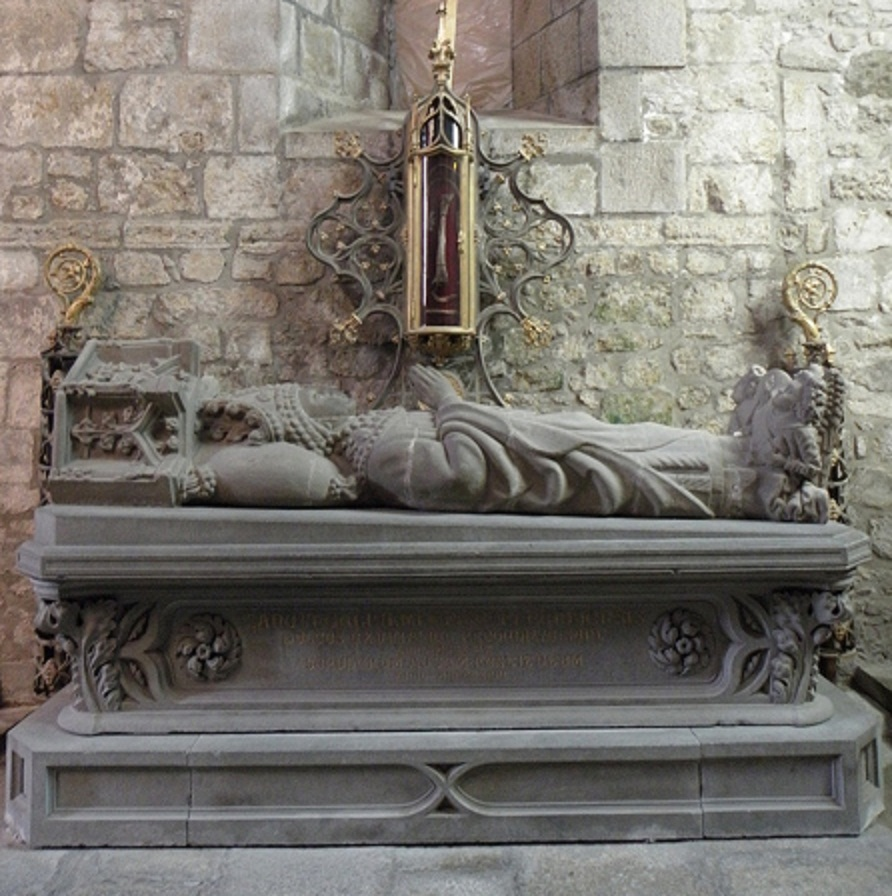
Tomb.

Guillaume Pinchon was born circa 1175 in Saint-Alban to the peasants Oliver Pinchon and Jane Fortin.

He first studied in Saint-Brieuc where he received the minor orders and he served as an aide to three bishops - later his three immediate predecessors in the diocese. He first served as a canon for the Tours Cathedral after Bishop Josselin ordained him to the priesthood.

Pinchon was appointed as the Bishop of Saint-Brieuc in 1220. He was known for his staunch defense of Church rights against secular intervention and was a champion of the poor. In 1225 he sold all his possessions in a famine to aid the poor and homeless. The duke Peter I forced him into a brief exile in 1228 and he spent that time living for a while in Poitiers before he returned to his diocese in 1230 after the duke reconciled with Pope Gregory IX. It was during his exile in Poitiers that he assisted the ill bishop there and helped him in his ecclesial duties.

The bishop was noted for his meekness and for his self-mortifications. He slept on bare boards despite the poor making a soft and comfortable one for him and also borrowed corn often to help the poor who starved.

He died in 1234 and his remains were later discovered in 1236 to be incorrupt. His relics were burned sometime during the French Revolution.

== Sainthood ==
Pope Innocent IV canonized Pinchon on 24 March 1247.
