= Amanheceu =

Single by Lu Andrade
- Released: May 5, 2014
- Genre: Folk; Indie pop
- Length: 4:10
- Label: Independent
- Songwriter: Lu Andrade
- Producer: Renato Patriarca

Lu Andrade singles chronology
"Mind and Heart" (2012)	"Amanheceu" (2014)	"Eu Acho Que Te Adoro" (2021)

Music video
- "Amanheceu" on YouTube

"Amanheceu" (transl. Dawned) is a song by Brazilian singer Lu Andrade. The track was released as the second single from her solo career. This song is a tribute to her late father.

== Composition ==
Her second single, "Amanheceu" is a Folk and Indie pop ballad written after her father, who died in 2007. The song was arranged by her band members Fabio Russo (guitar) and Fabrício Fruet (cello), produced by Renato Patriarca.

== Track listing ==
Digital download
No.	Title	Writer(s)	Producer(s)	Length
1.	"Amanheceu"	Lu Andrade	Renato Patriarca	4:10

== Release history ==
Region	Date	Format	Label
Brazil	May 5, 2014	Digital download	Independent
