= Luciana Andrade (EP) =

EP by Luciana Andrade
- Released: 21 November 2010
- Recorded: 2010
- Genre: Folk pop; indie pop
- Length: 14:03
- Language: Portuguese
- Label: Independent

Luciana Andrade chronology
Luciana Andrade (2010)	Lu Andrade – Ao Vivo no Estúdio Showlivre (2013)

Luciana Andrade is the debut extended play by Brazilian singer Luciana Andrade. The EP was released on November 21, 2010, on their official website.

== Track listing ==
No.	Title	Length
1.	"De Longe"	3:44
2.	"Tão Diferente"	2:53
3.	"A Casa Mal-Assombrada"	4:27
4.	"De Longe (Acustic)"	3:39
Total length:		14:03
