= Diocese of Saint-Brieuc =

Catholic diocese in France

Coordinates: 48.51°N 2.77°W

Diocese of Saint-Brieuc and Tréguier Dioecesis Briocensis et Trecorensis Diocèse de Saint-Brieuc et Tréguier Eskopti Sant-Brieg ha Landreger

Catholic
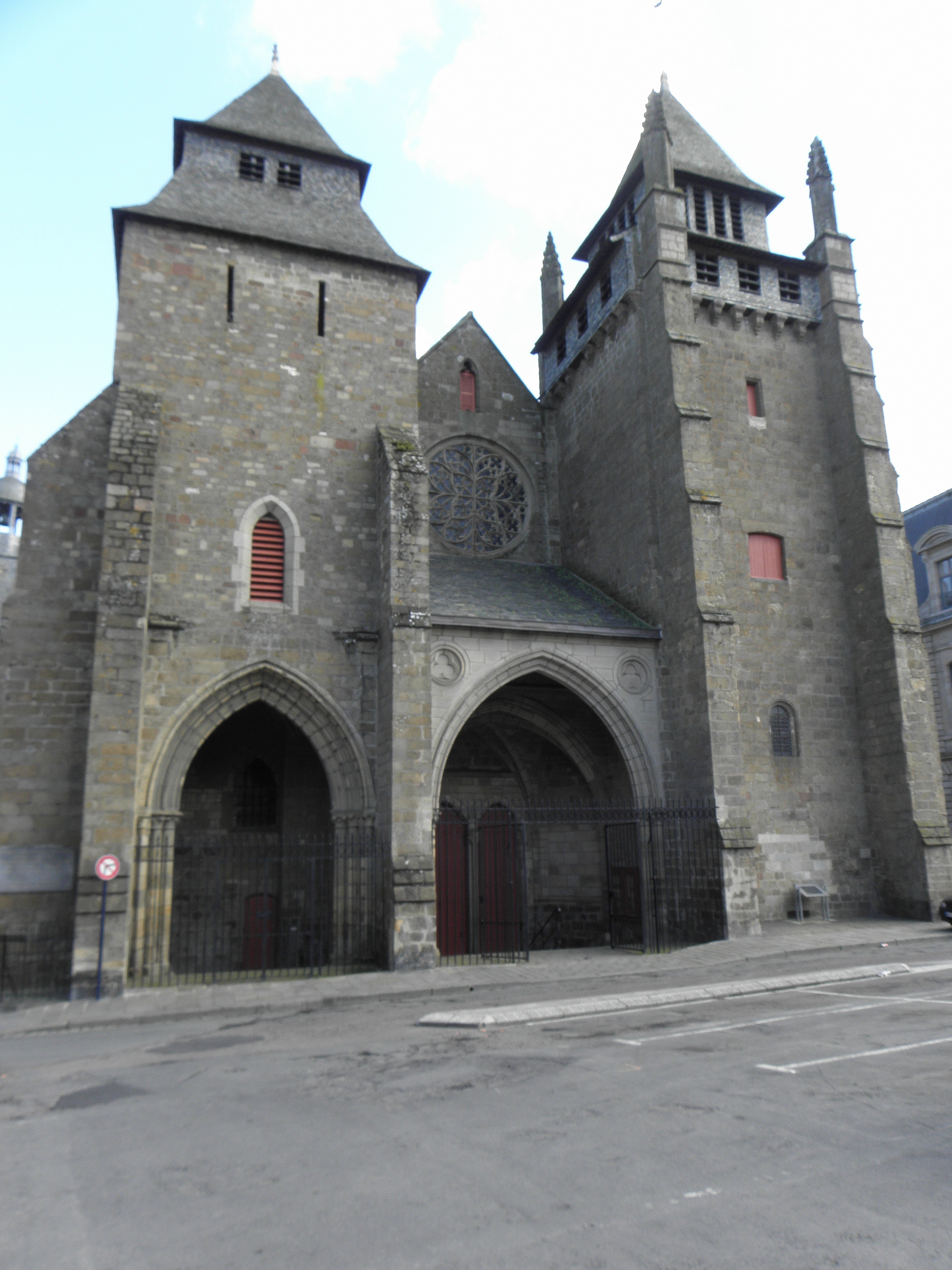
- Saint-Brieuc Cathedral

Location
- Country: France
- Ecclesiastical province: Rennes
- Metropolitan: Archdiocese of Rennes, Dol, and Saint-Malo

Statistics
- Area: 6,867 km^{2} (2,651 sq mi)
- Population: Total; Catholics: (as of 2022); 613,000; 595,000 (97.1%)
- Parishes: 48

Information
- Denomination: Roman Catholic
- Sui iuris church: Latin Church
- Rite: Roman Rite
- Established: 5th Century (As Diocese of Saint-Brieuc); 23 January 1852 (As Diocese of Saint-Brieuc - Tréguier
- Cathedral: Cathedral Basilica of St. Stephen in Saint-Brieuc
- Patron saint: Saint Brioc; Saint William Pinchon
- Secular priests: 105 (Diocesan); 11 (Religious Orders); 37 Permanent Deacons

Current leadership
- Pope: Leo XIV
- Bishop: Denis Moutel
- Metropolitan Archbishop: Pierre d'Ornellas
- Bishops emeritus: Lucien Fruchaud Bishop Emeritus (1992-2010)

Map

Website
- http://saintbrieuc-treguier.catholique.fr/?lang=fr

The Diocese of Saint-Brieuc and Tréguier (Latin: Dioecesis Briocensis et Trecorensis; French: Diocèse de Saint-Brieuc et Tréguier; Breton: Eskopti Sant-Brieg ha Landreger) is a Latin Church diocese of the Catholic Church in France. The diocese comprises the department of Côtes d'Armor in the Region of Brittany. The diocese is currently suffragan to the Archdiocese of Rennes, Dol, and Saint-Malo. The current bishop is Denis Moutel, appointed in 2010.

Originally erected, according to legend, in the 5th century, the diocese was suppressed by the French Revolution. Re-established by the Concordat of 1802, the diocese became a suffragan to the Archdiocese of Tours. Later, in 1850, it became suffragan of the Archdiocese of Rennes. The Diocese of Saint-Brieuc was formed to include: (1) the ancient diocese of the same name; (2) the greater portion of the Diocese of Tréguier; (3) a part of the old Dioceses of St. Malo, Dol, and Quimper and Léon, and (4) the parishes of the Diocese of Vannes. In 1852 the Bishops of Saint-Brieuc were authorized to add to their title that of the ancient See of Tréguier.

In 2022, in the Diocese of Saint-Brieuc and Tréguier there was one priest for every 5,129 Catholics.

== History ==
A Welsh saint, Brioc(us) (Brieuc), who died at the beginning of the sixth century founded in honour of St. Stephen a monastery which afterwards bore his name, and from which sprang the town of Saint-Brieuc. Brieuc's life makes no mention of him being a bishop. An inscription later than the ninth century on his tomb at Saint-Serge at Angers, where his alleged body was transported in the 850s, mentions him as the first Bishop of Saint-Brieuc. His alleged remains at Saint-Serge were moved to a different tomb in 1166, in the presence of King Henry II of England. His remains were carried back to Saint-Brieuc in 1210.

It was King Nomenoe who, about the middle of the ninth century, is said to have made the monastery the seat of a bishop. Barthélemy Hauréau, however, begins his series of bishops in Gallia christiana with Bishop Adam (ca. 1032).

Among the bishops of Saint-Brieuc, the following are mentioned: St. Guillaume Pinchon (1220–34), who protected the rights of the episcopate against Pierre Mauclerc, Duke of Brittany, and was forced to go into exile for some time at Poitiers; Jean du Tillet (1553–64), later Bishop of Meaux; Denis de La Barde (1641–75); and Jean-Baptiste de Caffarelli du Falga (1802-15).

The principal pilgrimages in the Diocese of Saint-Brieuc are: Notre-Dame de Bon Secours at Guingamp, the sanctuary of which was enriched by the munificence of the Dukes of Brittany; Notre Dame d'Espérance, at Saint-Brieuc, a pilgrimage dating from 1848; Notre Dame de La Fontaine at Saint-Brieuc, dating from the establishment of an oratory by Saint-Brieuc, and revived in 1893 to encourage devotion to that Saint; Notre Dame de Guyaudet, near St-Nicholas du Pélem; and Notre Dame de LaRonce, at Rostrenen, a church raised to the status of a Collegiate Church by Sixtus IV in 1483.

At the end of the eighteenth century, on the eve of the French Revolution, the Cathedral had a Chapter composed of six Dignities: the Dean, the Treasurer, the Archdeacon of Penthièvre, the Archdeacon of Goëlo, the Scholastic, and the Cantor; there were twenty prebends. The first prebend always belonged to the Duc de Penthièvre. There were 113 parish churches, 13 chapels in small villages, 4 Collegiate Churches (one just outside the walls of Saint-Brieuc dedicated to Guillaume Pinchon, the martyr bishop) and four abbeys of male monks.

During the French revolution the Diocese of Saint-Brieuc was abolished and subsumed into a new diocese, coterminous with the new 'Departement des Côtes-du-Nord', and a suffragan of the 'Metropole du Nord-Ouest' at Rennes. The clergy were required to swear an oath to the Constitution, and under the terms of the Civil Constitution of the Clergy a new bishop was to be elected by all the voters of the department. This placed them in schism with the Roman Catholic Church and the pope. The electors chose Father Jean-Marie Jacob, the curé of Lannebert, as their new Constitutional Bishop. He was consecrated in Nôtre-Dame in Paris by Constitutional Bishop Gobel on 1 May 1791. Gobel, a legitimate bishop, consecrated in 1772, had apostasized and was then Constitutional Bishop of Paris. The legitimate Bishop Bellecize had fled his diocese, leaving its administration in the hands of his vicars-general. 1n 1795 and 1796 Bishop Jacob was part of the movement seeking an accommodation with Rome. He faced great difficulties both from the flight of many of his clergy in the face of the Terror, and from the seizure of large areas of the countryside by the Chouans, who were loyal to the monarchy. Jacob fell ill during a trip to Paris and died there on 28 May 1801. An election was being prepared to choose his successor, when First Consul Napoleon Bonaparte ordered all the Constitutional Bishops to resign. He was striking a Concordat with Pope Pius VII, which included the liquidation of the Constitutional Church.

== Bishops of Saint-Brieuc ==
=== to 1200 ===
- Felix, or Garnobrius (in 859)
- Adam (attested in 1032)
- Haemon (c. 1075 – 1088)
- Guillaume
- Jean (1109–1133)
- Rolland (ca. 1144 – 1147)
- Geoffroy (subscribed a document in 1149)
- Joscius (ca. 1150 – 1157): promoted to Tours.
- Judicael (d. 1161)
- Goffridus (c. 1164 – 1202)

=== 1200–1400 ===
- Joscelin (c. 1201, 1206)
- Guillaume (c. 1206 – 1208)
- Pierre (1208 – c. 1212)
- Sylvester (c. 1213 – 1220)
- Guillaume Pinchon (1220 – 29 July 1234)
- Philippe (1235–1248)
- André (ca. 1251 – after 1255)
- Raoul (23 February 1257 – 1259 or 1260)
- Simon (1260–1271)
- Pierre de Vannes (29 May 1273 – after 1290)
- Geoffroy (by 1295 – 1312)
- Alain (8 January 1313 – 1320)
- Jean d'Avaugour (15 February 1320 – 1328): transferred to Dol 27 April 1328
- Mathieu Ferrandi (13 July 1328 – 1328) resigned
- Radulfus d'Escar (de la Fleche) (23 January 1329 – 17 March 1335).
- Gui de Montfort (1335–1357)
- Hugues de Montelais (21 August 1357 – 1375) promoted to the Cardinalate on 20 December 1375
- Laurent de la Faye (2 January 1376 – 6 August 1379) transferred to Avranches)
- Guillaume Beschard (6 August 1379 – 1385) (Avignon Obedience)
- Guillaume Auger (7 June 1385 – 22 March 1404) (Avignon Obedience)

=== 1400 to 1600 ===
- Jean de Malestroit [Châteaugiron] (2 May 1404 – 1419)
- Guillaume Eder (15 March 1428 – 1431, died)
- Hervé Huguet de Boiscrobin (29 January 1432 – 1436)
- Olivier de Tillet (4 July 1436 – end of 1438)
- Jean L'Espervier (Privent) (27 February 1439 – 25 April 1450)
- Jacques Pregent [Pencoel] (15 July 1450 – 1471)
- Pierre de Montfort de Laval (19 February 1472 – 8 October 1473)
- Christophe de Penmarc'h (14 January 1478 – 17 December 1505)
- Olivier du Châtel (9 March 1506 – 16 May 1525)
- Jean de Rieux (6 September 1525 – 1545)
- François de Mauny (8 June 1545 – 13 September 1553)
- Jean du Tillet (Appointed 18 September 1553 – 5 August 1564)
- Nicolas Lancelier (5 August 1564 – 1595)

=== 1600 to 1800 ===
- Melchior Marconnai (19 November 1601 – 7 March 1608)
- Andreas le Porc de la Porte (3 September 1618 – 22 June 1631)
- Etienne de Virazel (10 November 1631 Appointed - 1 June 1641 Died)
- Denis de la Barde (26 May 1642 – 22 May 1675)
- Hardouin Fortin de la Hoguette (23 March 1676 - 2 February 1680)
- Louis-Marcel de Coëtlogon-Méjusseaume (1 September 1681 - 11 April 1705)
- Louis Frétat de Boissieu (7 September 1705 Appointed - 30 October 1720 Died)
- Pierre Guillaume de La Vieuxville-Pourpris (28 May 1721 - 13 September 1727 Died)
- Louis-François de Vivet de Montclus (20 October 1727 Appointed - 13 September 1744)
- Hervé-Nicolas Thépault de Brignou (1744 Appointed - 26 January 1766 Died)
- François Bareau de Girac (31 August 1766 Ordained Bishop - 1769)
- Jules-Basile Ferron de La Ferronnays (1769 Appointed - 1774)
- Hugues-François de Regnault-Bellescize (1774 Appointed - 20 September 1796 Died)
  - Jean-Marie Jacob (Constitutional Bishop) (1791 – 1801)

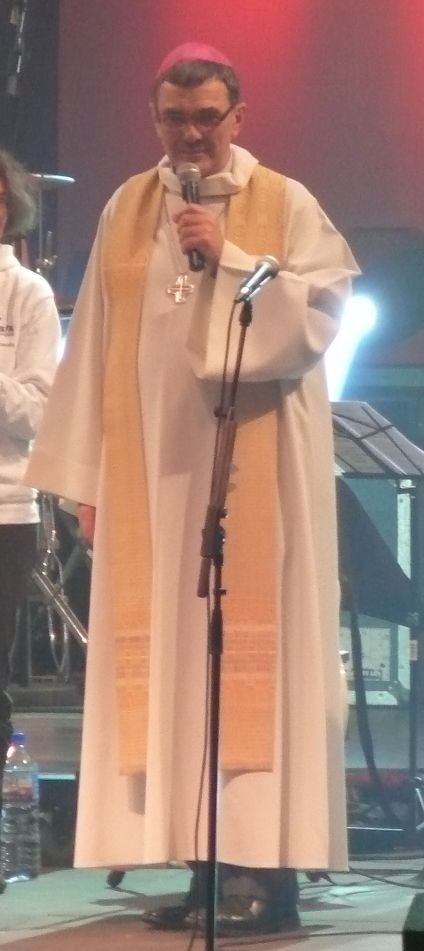
Bishop Denis Moutel

=== 1800 to present ===
- Jean-Baptiste de Caffarelli du Falga (9 April 1802 – 11 January 1815)
- Mathias Le Groing de La Romagère (11 October 1817 – 19 February 1841)
- Jacques-Jean-Pierre Le Mée (22 March 1841 – 31 July 1858)
- Guillaume-Elisée Martial (3 August 1858 – 26 December 1861)
- Augustin David (14 January 1862 – 27 July 1882)
- Eugène-Ange-Marie Bouché (20 September 1882 – 4 June 1888)
- Pierre-Marie-Frédéric Fallières (28 August 1889 – 11 May 1906)
- Jules-Laurent-Benjamin Morelle (13 July 1906 – 9 January 1923)
- François-Jean-Marie Serrand (4 June 1923 – 20 March 1949)
- Armand Coupel † (20 March 1949 Succeeded – 19 January 1961 Retired)
- François-Louis-Marie Kervéadou † (19 January 1961 – 2 October 1976 Resigned)
- Pierre Jean Marie Kervennic † (2 October 1976 – 21 December 1991)
- Lucien Fruchaud (17 July 1992 – 20 August 2010 Retired)
- Denis Moutel (20 August 2010 – )

== Bibliography ==
=== Reference works ===
- Gams, Pius Bonifatius (1873). Series episcoporum Ecclesiae catholicae: quotquot innotuerunt a beato Petro apostolo. Ratisbon: Typis et Sumptibus Georgii Josephi Manz. pp. 615–616. (Use with caution; obsolete)
- Eubel, Conradus, ed. (1913). Hierarchia catholica, Tomus 1 (second ed.). Münster: Libreria Regensbergiana. (in Latin) pp. 146.
- Eubel, Conradus, ed. (1914). Hierarchia catholica, Tomus 2 (second ed.). Münster: Libreria Regensbergiana. (in Latin) p. 264.
- Gulik, Guilelmus (1923). Eubel, Conradus (ed.). Hierarchia catholica, Tomus 3 (second ed.). Münster: Libreria Regensbergiana. p. 329.
- Gauchat, Patritius (Patrice) (1935). Hierarchia catholica IV (1592-1667). Münster: Libraria Regensbergiana. pp. 362.
- Ritzler, Remigius; Sefrin, Pirminus (1952). Hierarchia catholica medii et recentis aevi V (1667-1730). Patavii: Messagero di S. Antonio. pp. 408.
- Ritzler, Remigius; Sefrin, Pirminus (1958). Hierarchia catholica medii et recentis aevi VI (1730-1799). Patavii: Messagero di S. Antonio. p. 436.

=== Studies ===
- Geslin de Bourgogne, Jules Henri; and A. de Barthelemy (1855). Anciens évêchés de Bretagne: Diocèse de Saint-Brieuc (in French). Vol. Tome I. Paris: Dumoulin. (four volumes)
- Chadwick, Nora Kershaw (1969). Early Brittany. Cardiff: University of Wales Press. ISBN 9780900768262.
- Duchesne, Louis (1910). Fastes épiscopaux de l'ancienne Gaule: II. L'Aquitaine et les Lyonnaises. Paris: Fontemoing. second edition (in French) pp. 390–391.
- Guimart, Charles (1852). Histoire des évêques de Saint-Brieuc (in French). Saint-Brieuc: L. Prud'homme.
- Hauréau, Barthélemy (1856). Gallia Christiana: In Provincias Ecclesiasticas Distributa... De provincia Turonensi (in Latin). Vol. Tomus Quartus decimus (XIV). Paris: Typographia Regia. pp. 1084–1118, Instrumenta, pp. 261–270.
- Jean, Armand (1891). Les évêques et les archevêques de France depuis 1682 jusqu'à 1801 (in French). Paris: A. Picard. pp. 454–458.
- Poquet du Haut-Jussé, B.A. (1947). "Les évêques de Bretagne dans la renaissance religeuse du XVIIe siècle". Annales de Bretagne (in French). 54: 30–59. doi:10.3406/abpo.1947.1847.
- Société bibliographique (France) (1907). L'épiscopat français depuis le Concordat jusqu'à la Séparation (1802-1905). Paris: Librairie des Saints-Pères.
