= Tuatha de Danann (band) =

Brazilian Celtic metal band

- Origin: Varginha, Minas Gerais, Brazil
- Genres: Folk metal, Progressive rock, Celtic metal
- Years active: 1995–2012, 2013–present
- Labels: Heavy Metal Rock, Paradoxx Music, Louder Music
- Members: Bruno Maia; Giovani Gomes; Rafael Wagner; Rafael Delfino; Nathan Viana

Tuatha de Danann is a Brazilian Celtic metal band formed in 1995 in Varginha, Minas Gerais; it is known for their merry Celtic dance rhythms, flute melodies, Celtic mythology-inspired lyrics and the original jesting tones such as gnome-choirs, etc. The band is named after the race of supernaturally-gifted people in Irish mythology, the Tuatha Dé Danann, roughly translated to "People of Dana".

Between July and August 2005, Tuatha de Danann did their first tour outside Brazil; they performed in France and Germany. In France, the band played shows in Saint Brieuc, Languidic, Brest, Hennebont, Tours, Grenoble, and Rheims, while in Germany the band played at the Wacken Open Air festival.

Following a hiatus, the band returned in 2013 at the Roça 'n' Roll festival organized by frontman Bruno Maia; during the occasion they performed with Martin Walkyier (ex-Sabbat, ex-Skyclad).

In 2015, they released their first album since 2004's Trova di Danú: Dawn of the New Sun. In the period between both efforts, two groups spun off Tuatha de Danann: Kemunna and Tray of Gift. Maia also released a solo album, Braia.

In 2019, they released In Nomine Éireann, containing 11 songs, nine of which are traditional Irish songs. One of the original songs, "King", was perceived as criticizing Brazil's president Jair Bolsonaro. In 2023 they released The Nameless Cry.

On 13 November 2024, the band announced through their social media that keyboardist Edgard Brito had died at the age of 50.

== Line-up ==
=== Current members ===
- Bruno Maia – lead vocals, guitars, flute, whistle, mandolin, bodhrán (1994–2010, 2013–present)
- Giovani Gomes – bass, harsh vocals (1999–2010, 2013–present)
- Rafael Wagner – guitar (2019–present)
- Rafael Delfino – drums (2019–present)

=== Former members ===
- Rogério Vilela – bass (1995–1999)
- Wilson Melkor – drums (1995–2000)
- Felipe Batiston – keyboards (1995–2000)
- Marcos Ulisses – vocals (1998–1999)
- Leonardo Godtfriedt – keyboards, violin (2000–2002)
- Rafael Castro – keyboards, piano (2002–2003)
- Rodrigo Berne – lead guitar (1994–2010, 2013–2017)
- Alex Navar – uilleann pipes (2013–2018)
- Rodrigo Abreu – drums, percussion (2000–2010, 2013–2018)
- Edgard Brito – keyboards (2003–2010, 2013–2024; his death)

=== Touring/session members ===
- Rafael Wagner – guitar
- Alex Navar – bagpipe
- Nathan Viana – violin
- Rafael Delfino – drums

== Discography ==
=== Studio albums ===
- Tuatha de Danann (1999)(EP)
- Tingaralatingadun (2001)
- The Delirium Has Just Begun... (2002)
- Trova di Danú (2004)
- Dawn of a New Sun (2015)
- The Tribes of Witching Souls (2019)(EP)
- In Nomine Éireann (2020)
- The Nameless Cry (2023)

=== Live albums/DVDs ===
- Acoustic Live (2009 – Acoustic DVD)

=== Demos ===
- The Last Pendragon (1996, demo released under the name Pendragon)
- Faeryage (1998, demo)

=== Singles ===
- "Dawn of a New Sun" (2014)
