= Joscius (archbishop of Tours) =

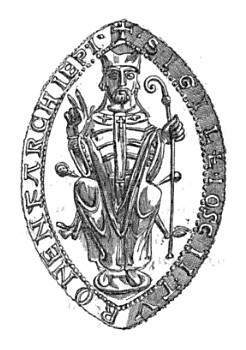
Joscius' seal

Joscius or Josce (died 1173) was a Breton Catholic prelate. He was the bishop of Saint-Brieuc from 1150 until 1157 and then archbishop of Tours until his death.

Joscius was born in Brittany to noble parents, probably in the diocese of Saint-Brieuc. He became a canon at and later the cellarer of Saint Martin's in Tours. He was elected bishop of Saint-Brieuc with the support of Duke Odo of Brittany in 1150.

After being translated to Tours, Joscius immediately began to quarrel with the convents of his diocese until king Louis VII was obliged to interfere. He demanded an oath of obedience from the abbot of Cormery, a demand which was upheld by arbitration in 1174. The Chronicle of Tours singles out Joscius for his aggressive stance towards Saint Martin's. Surviving charters also show that he ramped up jurisdictional disputes with Saint-Julien.

Joscius was at various times "a useful ally" of King Louis, King Henry II of England, Thomas Becket and Pope Alexander III. When Frederick Barbarossa pretended to judge the claims of the rival popes, Victor IV and Alexander III, King Louis and King Henry sent Joscius to Alexander to assure him of their support and bring him to France. In 1163, Alexander convened the Council of Tours. While there, he confirmed the archbishop's right to grant the chrism to the priests of Saint-Pierre-le-Puellier, while leaving the canons of Saint Martin's a limited right of presentation. The canons resisted this by locking the church of Saint-Pierre. Joscius responded by writing letters to Louis VII and was ultimately successful in vindicating his rights.

In 1167, Joscius' relationship with Henry II soured after he argued that monies raised for the crusades in the Touraine ought to be controlled by Louis VII. Joscius was the prelate who, after the murder of Thomas Becket (1170), was commissioned by the pope to excommunicate Henry II. It was Joscius also who, when Henry had received absolution in 1172, went to him at Caen, and publicly declared him reconciled to the church.

According to the necrology of Tours, Joscius died in 1173. Some chronicles place his death in 1174 or 1175, but Robert of Torigni agrees with the year 1173 when discussing his succession. Joscius was buried in the cathedral of Tours.

== Bibliography ==
- Barlow, Frank (1986). Thomas Becket. University of California Press.
- Duggan, Anne J., ed. (2000). The Correspondence of Thomas Becket, Archbishop of Canterbury, 1162–1170. Vol. II: Letters 176–329. Clarendon Press.
- Dumas, François (1894). De Joscii Turonensis archiepiscopi vita (1157–1173). Paris: Hachette.
- Farmer, Sharon (2019). Communities of Saint Martin: Legend and Ritual in Medieval Tours. Cornell University Press. doi:10.1353/book.68528.
- McClintock, John; Strong, James, eds. (1872). "Joscius". Cyclopædia of Biblical, Theological and Ecclesiastical Literature. Vol. 4. New York: Harper and Brothers. p. 1012.
- Walker, David (1983). "Crown and Episcopacy under the Normans and Angevins". Anglo-Norman Studies. 5: 220–233.
