= Mind and Heart =

Single by Lu Andrade
- Released: September 24, 2012
- Genre: Indie pop
- Length: 4:10
- Label: Independent
- Songwriters: Lu Andrade; Bruna Caram
- Producer: Renato Patriarca

Lu Andrade singles chronology
"Mind and Heart" (2012)	"Amanheceu" (2014)

Music video
- "Mind and Heart" on YouTube

"Mind and Heart" is a song by Brazilian singer Lu Andrade. It was released as the first official single of her solo career.

== Background ==
The song was composed by Andrade in partnership with Bruna Caram. "I showed this song to my producer at the time, Alexandre Fontanetti, and he asked me if I wanted to show a singer who he had recently produced and who was very talented, Bruna Caram, she sent me a recording on the piano with a beautiful part that perfectly completes the idea, I hope it's our first partnership with many," said Luciana. The track was produced and mixed by Renato Patriarca in 2012.

== Music video ==
Edited and directed by João Parisi, the music video was recorded at the Oxford Studio in April 2013 and Studio Midas in November 2012. The music video was released on Andrade's official YouTube channel on May 16, 2013.

== Relanse and performances ==
On December 24, 2012, Andrade released her first official single, "Mind and Heart", which received promotion in several television programs, including Todo Seu, Leão Lobo Visita and Jornal da Record News, besides the Brasil Ideal and Tá Ligado, of broadcasters in the interior of São Paulo.
