= Saint-Julien Abbey, Tours =

Abbey in Tours, France

Saint-Julien Abbey
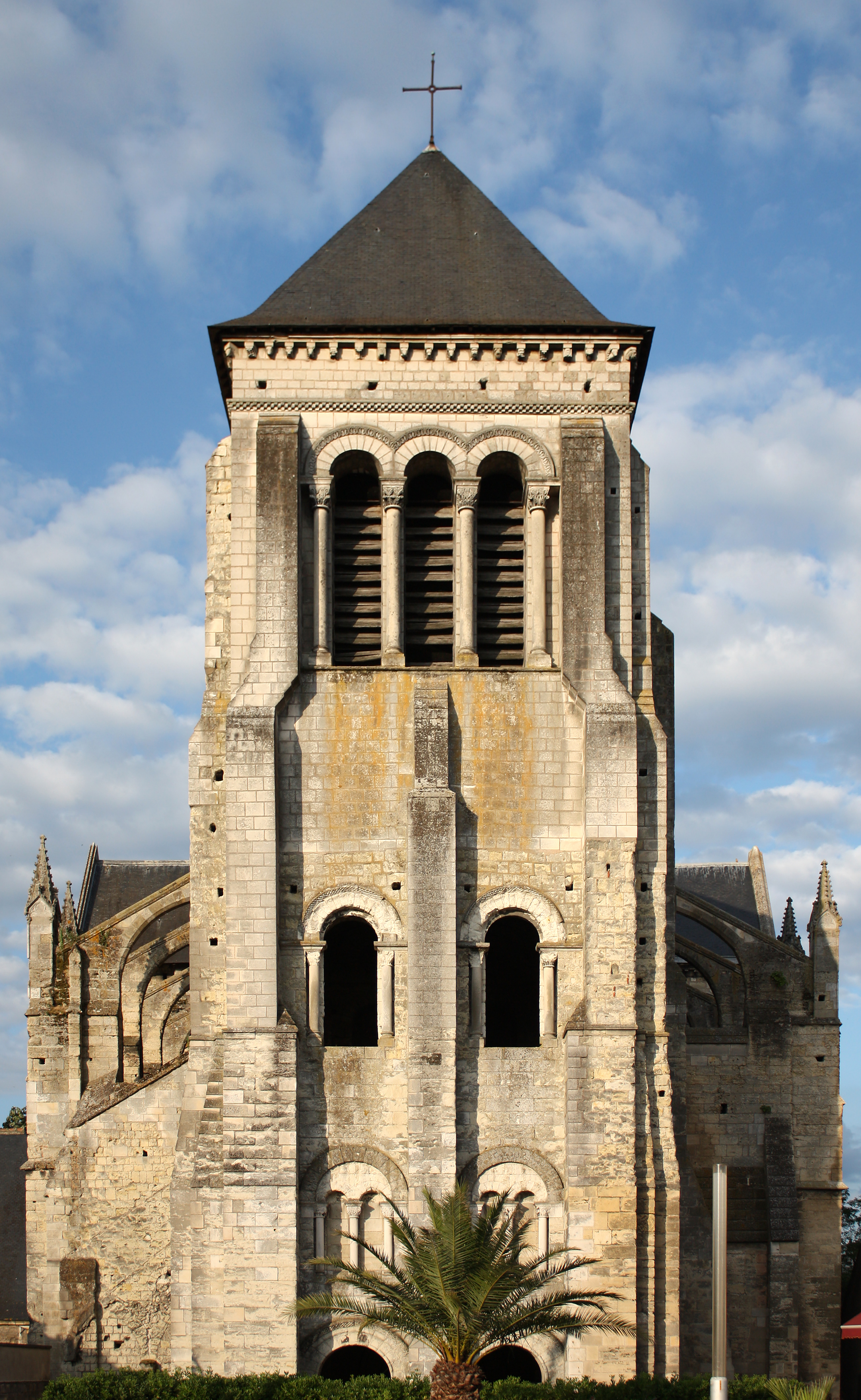
- The tower-porch of the former abbey church.

Religion
- Affiliation: Catholicism

Location
- Location: Tours, Indre-et-Loire, Centre-Val de Loire, France
- Interactive map of Saint-Julien Abbey
- Coordinates: 47°23′45″N 0°41′14″E

The Saint-Julien Abbey in Tours, France, is an ancient Benedictine abbey dating back to the 6th century.

Today's buildings date from the 10th to the 16th century, and have all been classified or listed as historic monuments.

== Location ==
The abbey grounds fell within a perimeter bounded by rue Colbert to the south, rue Voltaire to the east and the banks of the Loire to the north; on the west side, they extended beyond rue Nationale (formerly rue Royale).

== Foundation of the abbey ==
In the early years of the sixth century, Visigothic troops set out from Spain to conquer the provinces of Gaul, disorganized after the demise of the Roman Empire twenty-five years earlier. In the spring of 507, Clovis I won a decisive victory at Vouillé, northwest of Poitiers: the Visigoth king Alaric II was killed in battle, his army crushed and the Visigoths driven back beyond the Pyrenees.

Clovis, who had been a Christian since his baptism in Rheims, perhaps in 499, came to Tours in 508 to worship at the Basilica of Saint-Martin, where he received the insignia of consul and decided to build a small oratory dedicated to Notre-Dame, halfway between Tours Cathedral and the Basilica of Saint-Martin, along the ancient road that runs along the left bank of the Loire (today's Rue Colbert). This road also provides a link between the two major Martinian sites in Touraine: the basilica where Martin is buried, on the left bank of the Loire, and Marmoutier, the monastery he founded, a few kilometers upstream on the right bank; pilgrims coming to the Saint-Martin basilica therefore stop to pray at the Notre-Dame oratory, built in an area that no longer appears to have been urbanized since the end of the first century, when it seems to have been given over to agriculture. Curiously, Gregory of Tours, in his account of Clovis' visit to Tours, makes no mention of the founding of the oratory.

== History of the abbey ==
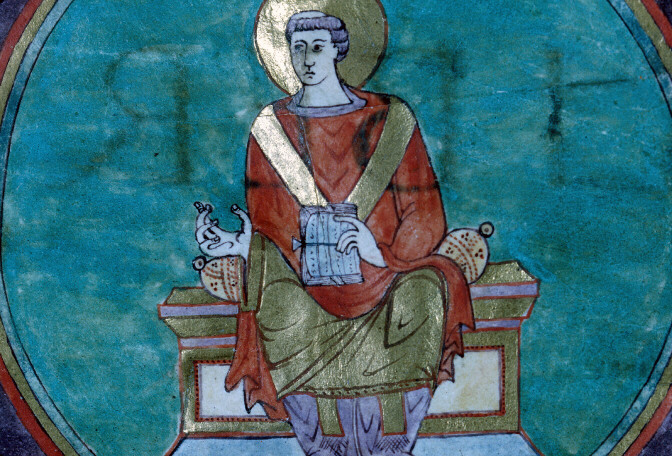
Gregory of Tours (Sacramentary of Marmoutier, c. 850)

=== Gregory of Tours: the Benedictine abbey ===
This was the nucleus around which the future Saint-Julien Abbey was built. Over the decades, monks and ascetics from the Auvergne settled in cells built around the Notre-Dame oratory. Early in his episcopate, around 575, Gregory of Tours, himself of Auvergne origin, entrusted these monks with relics of St. Julien that he had brought back from Brioude, and imposed the rule of St. Benedict on the congregation: the Benedictine Abbey of St. Julien de Tours was born.

Little is known about the events of the following three centuries (written sources from this period are exceptional), but in 853, the abbey was destroyed by the Normans during one of the raids they led against Tours up the Loire, during which they also pillaged Marmoutier.

=== Theotolon: the Carolingian abbey ===
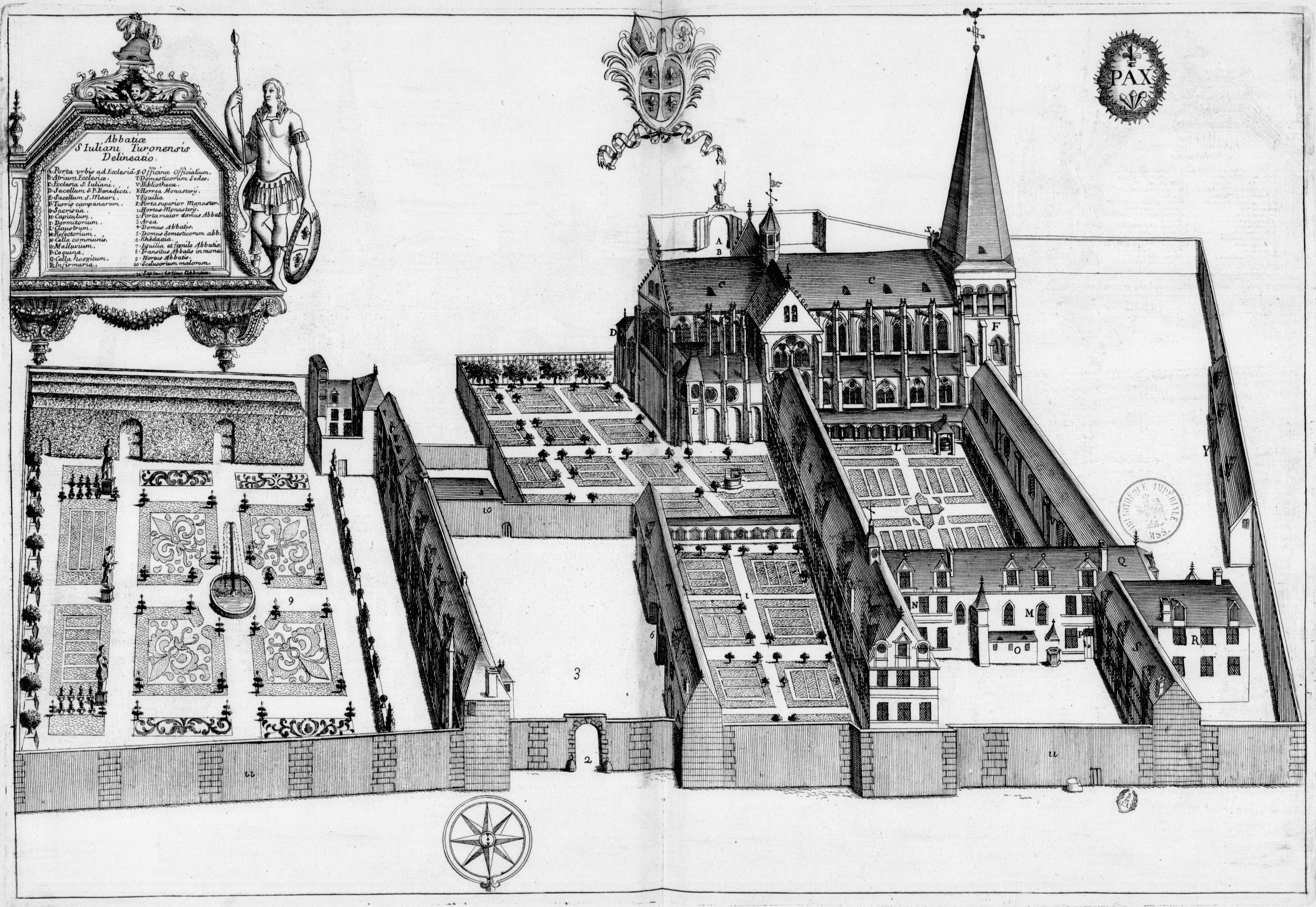
Seventeenth-century engraved plate depicting Saint-Julien abbey, in the book Monasticon Gallicanum.

Around 940, Theotolon, archbishop of Tours since 931, set about revitalizing the abbey both spiritually and temporally. In particular, he built the first abbey church, which was consecrated in 943 under the dual names of "Notre-Dame and Saint-Julien"; some vestiges of this church remain in the foundations of later buildings, as well as in the north wall of the transept. To run the abbey, Theotolon called on his friend Odo, a monk who may have come from the Loire Valley but was then abbot of Cluny; he was to become the first abbot of Saint-Julien. Theotolon was also able to draw on his own wealth and that of his sister Gersinde, notably through several fiefs bequeathed to the abbey. Theotolon seems to have exchanged land on numerous occasions, in order to consolidate the abbey's holdings around Saint-Julien as much as possible; this involved mainly agricultural land (arable and vineyards), which was intended to ensure the self-sufficiency of the abbey's monks. Other land, owned by the monks of Saint-Julien, was located in the suburbium of Saint-Martin, between the Châteauneuf enclosure and the Loire River, and was used by laymen in the service of the monks of Saint-Julien. Such an arrangement can be explained: before becoming Archbishop of Tours, Theotolon was one of the founders of the Abbey of Cluny; even before that, he had been Dean of Saint-Martin and, in this capacity, had already undertaken land transactions to the north of his collegiate church; it is therefore not surprising that he continued them in the same sector, this time for the benefit of the monks of Saint-Julien.

Around the same time, the abbey of Saint-Julien benefited from the privilege of exemption (from taxation) and escaped the Count's justice. Odon (d. 943), Théotolon (d. 947) and Gersinde were buried in the abbey church of Saint-Julien; the graves of Odon and Théotolon were identified during work carried out in the 19th century in the chancel of the present-day church. The fact that Theotolon chose to be buried in the abbey church of Saint-Julien, whereas the other bishops of Tours had overwhelmingly chosen the basilica of Saint-Martin, is indicative of his attachment to Saint-Julien abbey.

In 996, Abbot Bernard "had a tower built", says the chronicle, without giving any further details. It is unknown whether this was an independent tower within the abbey's perimeter, perhaps a defensive tower, or a tower added to the Carolingian church, the latter being the more likely hypothesis, even in the absence of archaeological remains. It is also unknown what buildings existed at the time (apart from a cellar and a "canteen"), how much space the abbey occupied or how many monks lived there. However, it is known that Abbot Gausbert (also founder of Bourgueil Abbey), Bernard's successor, encouraged the monks of Saint-Julien to practice the arts: goldsmithing, philosophy, illumination, and belles-lettres.

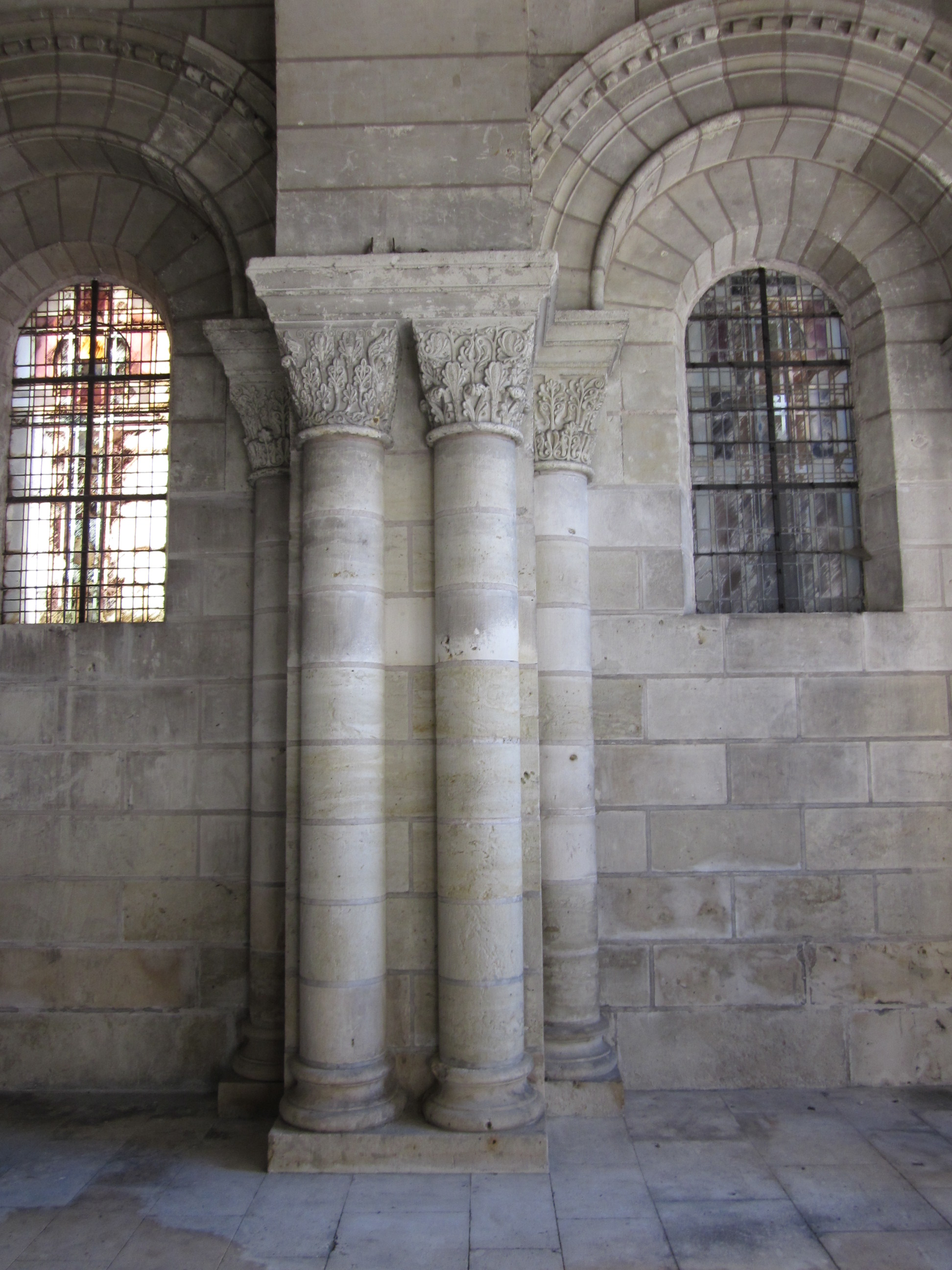
The tower porch.

=== The Romanesque abbey ===
At the very beginning of the 11th century, the abbey was plagued by internal conflicts. Arnoul, Archbishop of Tours, wanted to impose his father as head of the abbey, against the advice of the monks, who won their case in 1028. Throughout this quarrel, the abbey suffered. This led Richer, the new abbot, to rebuild the monastery buildings between 1031 and 1052.

At the same time, Touraine was going through a period of turmoil, marked by rivalry and wars between the houses of Blois and Anjou. In 1043, Geoffroy Martel, Count of Anjou and Vendôme, laid siege to Tours, then in the possession of Eudes II, Count of Blois. He used the abbey of Saint-Julien as a "base camp" for 18 months, causing major damage to the buildings and making Richer's reconstruction even more urgent.

In the second half of the 11th century, Abbot Gerbert completely rebuilt the abbey church in Romanesque style. The bell tower-porch that gives access to the present-day church most certainly dates from this reconstruction phase, as does the chapter house to the east of the cloister. However, it is not known whether the porch occupying the first floor of the bell tower was wide open on one or more sides from the time of its construction, or whether the layout seen today is the result of a later modification. Successive restorations have erased all traces of the original entrance. The new church was consecrated in 1084, under the auspices of Archbishop Raoul de Langeais, and dedicated to "Notre Dame, Saint Julien, and all the saints".

Around the same time, as urbanization gradually resumed in Tours, sector by sector, the abbey opportunely sold off building plots that were far from its enclosure; this move, also observed at Saint-Martin, enabled the abbey of Saint-Julien to increase its pecuniary wealth and more easily finance the reconstruction of the abbey church; for all that, it remained a major landowner in Tours. It also coveted the land reclaimed from the Loire, whose left bank had retreated northwards, and this was the source of numerous conflicts with Saint-Martin, who was also interested in this land.

At the beginning of the 11th century, the abbey experienced a period of significant prosperity, extending its authority over numerous fiefs, primarily in the northern part of Touraine and the Cher Valley. Its influence was so great that Saint-Julien was able to send its monks to support and strengthen other monastic communities, such as the Abbey of Bourgueil and the Saint-Pierre de la Couture in Le Mans.

=== The Gothic abbey ===
In 1224, on the night of Saint Matthias' Day (February 24), a violent storm hit Tours. It is unknown what damage it caused to the monastic buildings, but it is known that the abbey church was destroyed, with the exception of the bell tower, which survived. Once again, the church had to be rebuilt.

With time to raise the necessary funds, the abbey's new nave, built in Gothic style, was begun in 1243 by Abbot Évrard and, after a pause due to the Seventh Crusade (1248–1254), completed in 1259 under the abbatiate of Jean. It joins the surviving Romanesque tower to the west. Many late representations (such as that in the Monasticon Gallicanum) show a stone spire crowning the tower. Is this arrangement real or idealized? No source mentions the disappearance of this spire, like so many others at the time of the French Revolution, and today's architectural features make it impossible to say.

From this period onwards, the church took on the general form it is known today: a tower-porch giving access to a nave flanked by simple aisles, a transept with a single bay outside the aisles of the nave, then a choir with four aisles, the same width as the transept, the choir ending in a flat chevet. This latter arrangement is not clearly explained; perhaps an existing building to the east of the church prevented it from extending in this direction with a classical absidal chevet. Around 1300, the chevet was rebuilt, with the addition of two absidioles to extend the choir's outer aisles.

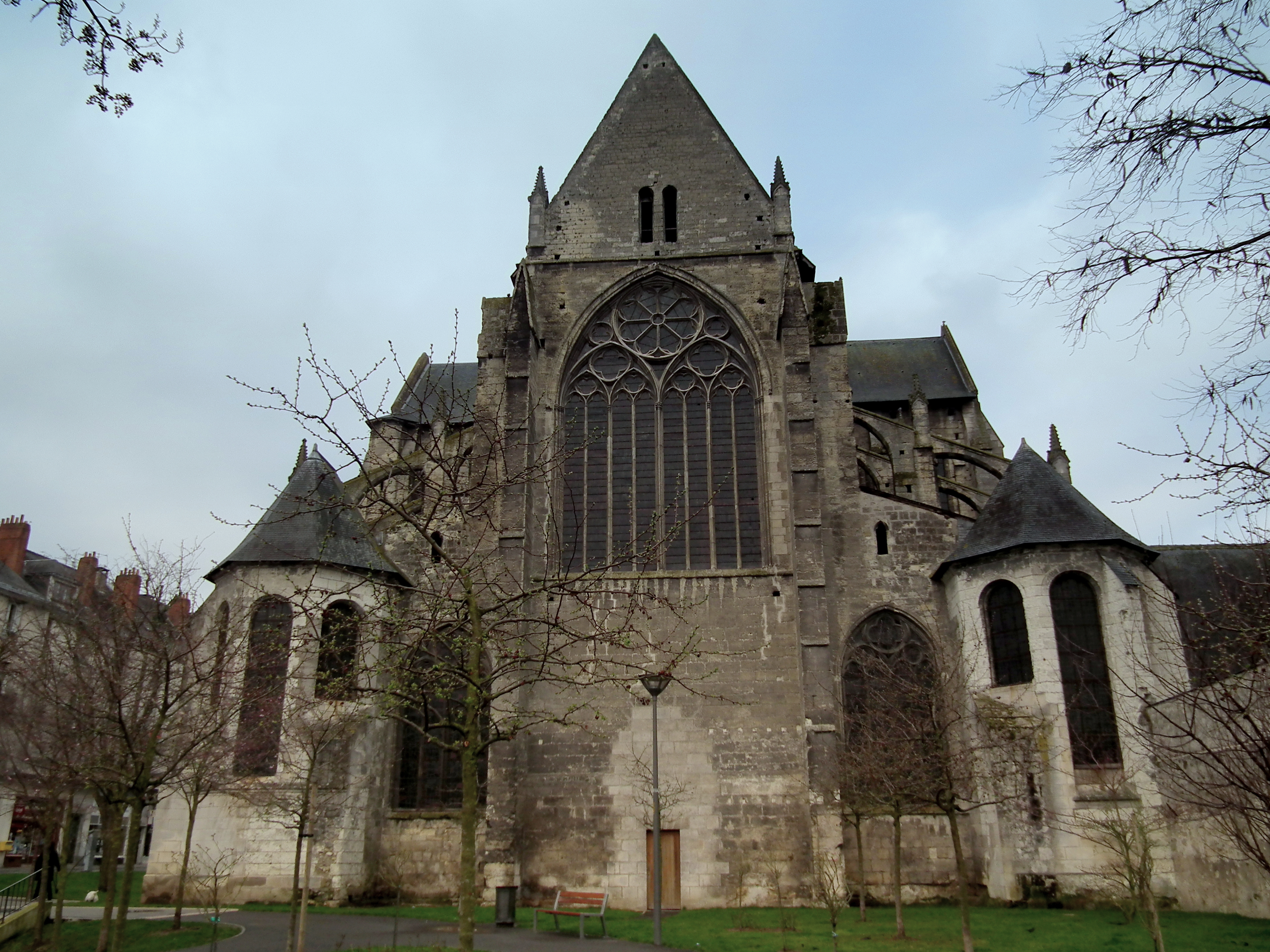
Abbey chevet.

This was a golden age for the abbey, which was bounded on the east by rue Voltaire (the abbot's residence and gardens), on the south by Grande-Rue (rue Colbert), and on the north by the banks of the Loire (rue Benjamin-Constant); to the west, the abbey's gardens extend well beyond the rue Nationale; the entrance is via a gateway opening onto the Grande-Rue at the same height as the one in the south aisle of the nave. The presence of the abbey and the land belonging to it between the two poles of the city would be an obstacle to urbanization in this sector for several centuries, as can still be seen, even on today's maps, in the layout of the streets.

In 1323, for example, the monks of Saint-Julien, Saint-Pierre-le-Puellier, and Saint-Martin were united in their opposition to the installation of the Carmelite convent, although this opposition was unsuccessful.

Unfortunately, this wealthy situation did not last. From the beginning of the 14th century, as the Church became poorer, the number of monks began to decline. This marked a turning point in the life of Saint-Julien. From 1389, the abbey lent its cloister to the annual elections of two of the officials responsible for managing the young city of Tours (the city council was created in 1385): one for the Cité, the other for Châteauneuf.

By 1540, Saint-Julien no longer had regular abbots. They were replaced by commendatory abbots—non-resident appointees who, lacking a physical presence at the abbey, were unable to enforce discipline effectively. As a result, adherence to the Benedictine rule steadily declined. These commendatory abbots were often more concerned with the revenues generated by their position than with the spiritual or communal life of the abbey under their charge. Nevertheless, between 1530 and 1540, the two choir apsidioles were rebuilt. The architectural structure of the abbey church has remained unchanged since then.

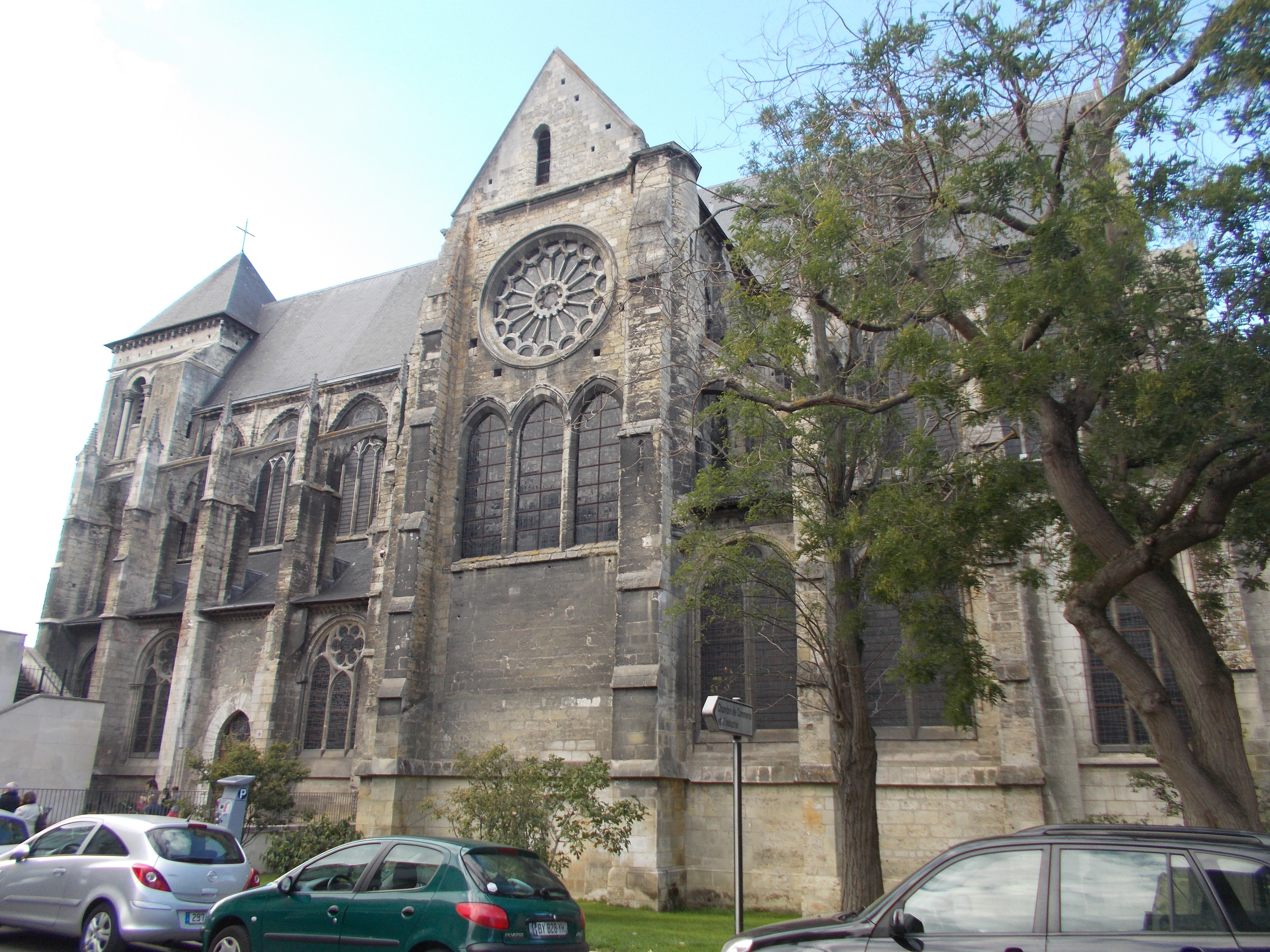
South facade of the abbey.

=== From the Wars of Religion to the Revolution ===
In April 1562, Saint-Julien Abbey, like other convents and churches in Tours, was pillaged by the Huguenots. The extent of the depredations is not precisely known, but it seems that the buildings suffered relatively little, even though Abbot Charles Do undertook repair work in 1584.

Between 1589 and 1594 (end of the reign of Henri III and beginning of the reign of Henri IV), sessions of the Parliament of France were held in the chapter house. At the time, Touraine was almost the only French province to fully recognize the king's authority in the face of the Ligueurs. This new intrusion of civil life into the abbey did little to enhance Saint-Julien's spiritual prestige.

In 1637, there was a change of regime. At the request of Abbot Georges Catinat, the Maurist monks took control of the abbey, restoring discipline, enforcing the Rule of St. Benedict, and "repopulating" the abbey with monks from their own community. In the same year, a violent hurricane destroyed the abbey's small cloister, which was never rebuilt.

At the dawn of the 18th century, Saint-Julien Abbey numbered around 20 monks. In 1735, Abbé Léonard de la Croix died, becoming Saint-Julien's 67th and last abbot. From then on, the abbey was attached to the Tours chapter and administered by a prior. The abbey's decline was inexorable, with each event being accompanied by the departure of a few monks. Around 1760, the abbey dwelling, by then unoccupied, was made available to the Governor of Touraine. At the same time, the abbey sold off a number of plots of land to the east of its enclosure, notably the gardens.

Between 1774 and 1786, the city of Tours underwent a major urban upheaval, with the construction of the Rue Neuve, the future Rue Nationale. This operation, which involved numerous expropriations, was of prime interest to the Abbey of Saint-Julien: the street was to run some fifteen meters west of the church. After lengthy legal proceedings, the abbey had to relinquish, reluctantly, the entire western part of its enclosure, including the chaplain's dwelling built into the surrounding wall, as well as extensive gardens. The abbey was also obliged to build buildings along the street, in the same way as the other residents, with the city of Tours responsible for the facades. Lastly, a new tax was levied on Saint-Julien, as on all Tours residents, for road maintenance. Saint-Julien opposed these decisions, and the conflicts were settled in court, to the abbey's disadvantage.

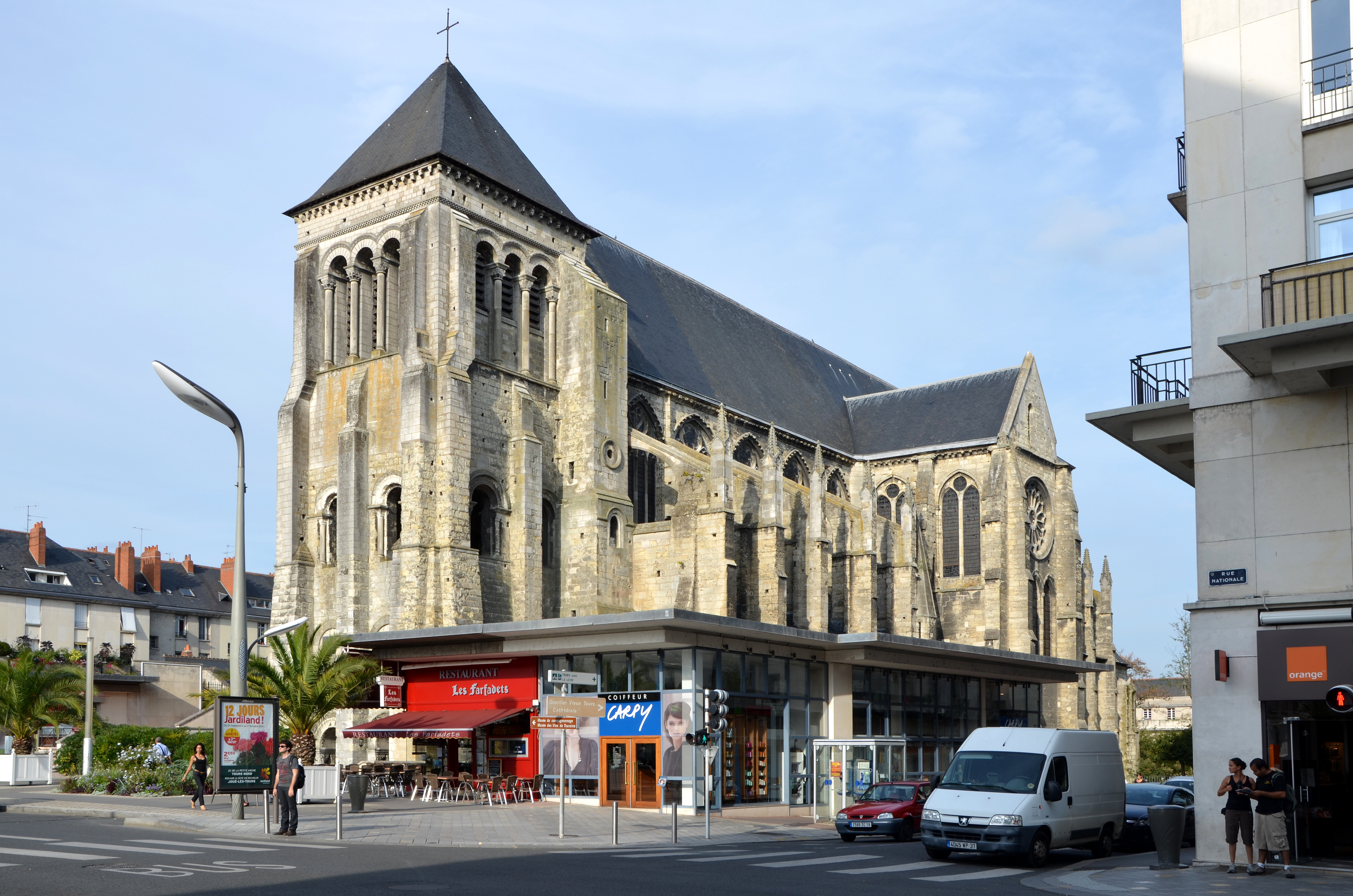
Saint-Julien church.

=== The Revolution and its consequences ===
In 1790, the few remaining monks were dispersed and the abbey was disused. Buildings and land were declared national property and sold in 12 separate lots in 1798 and 1799. Each owner built his or her own boundary walls and dwellings: the abbey had definitively lost its identity.

The church, ideally located at the entrance to the town on the Route d'Espagne, was converted in 1816 into a post office for the lines from Paris and Le Mans. Large openings were made in the walls of the nave, which served as a garage, to allow the passage of stagecoaches, as the tower porch was too narrow; the apses of the choir were converted into stables; and the bell tower was occupied. In 1828, part of the buildings that enclosed the cloister to the north were demolished to make way for the construction of the Museum of Natural History and the School of Fine Arts, the counterpart to the new Hôtel de Ville built in 1777 on the other side of the Rue Neuve. During the post-revolutionary period and up to the 2nd Republic, the church received no maintenance despite being used intensively; it was almost in ruins when, in 1840, it was included on the first national list of Historic Monuments by Prosper Mérimée, then Inspecteur des Monuments Historiques. From then on, the situation accelerated: put up for sale by its owner, the church was bought by the State on July 10, 1846 thanks to the help of the Archbishop of Tours, Mgr Morlot, who had launched a subscription campaign; the departmental and diocesan architect Gustave Guérin undertook major repair work between 1846 and 1857. At that time, the church had a massive appearance, as the ridges of the new roofs of the nave and bell tower were at the same level.

However, the repair and redevelopment work did not affect the area surrounding the abbey church, and the dwellings that had gradually been built up against the church walls were not destroyed.

=== The abbey restored to its former glory despite the war ===
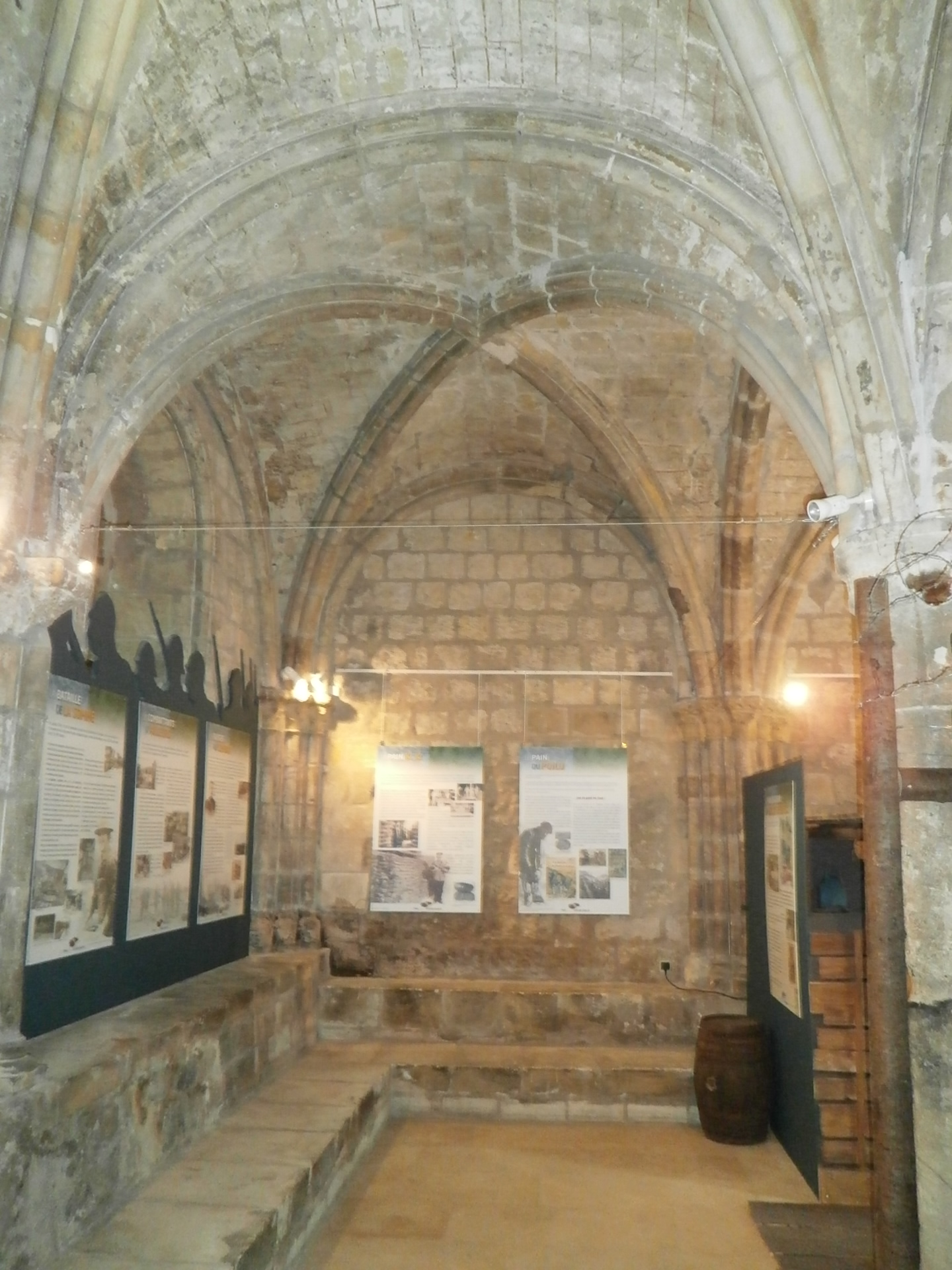
Capitular hall.

==== Reopening to worship ====
Saint-Julien church was reopened to worship in 1858, becoming a parish church (a first for it) in place of Saint-François de Paule, located in the south wing of the former Hôtel de Beaune-Semblançay. It was given a new dedication: "Saint-Julien et Saint-François de Paule", but in common parlance, it remained "l'église Saint-Julien". Among the damage suffered by the church during the revolutionary period was the disappearance of the original stained glass windows, which were replaced by new ones from the Lobin workshops, completed in 1895. The first forty years of the 20th century were a much quieter period for the surviving church and monastic buildings.

==== The Second World War ====
Of course, everything changed with the onset of the Second World War. On June 18, 1940, to halt the German advance, the Touraine authorities blew up the southern part of the stone bridge, with shards flying all around. From June 19 to 22, a gigantic fire ravaged all the northern districts of Tours, on both sides of the Rue Nationale, and the buildings in this sector fell victim to German shells fired from the hillside on the right bank of the Loire. For Saint-Julien, the damage was extensive:

- The former monastic buildings to the east of the church were destroyed by fire;
- The bell tower was decapitated, and the nave roof and a pointed arch were badly damaged;
- A shell exploded in the north transept;
- Most of the Lobin-stained glass did not survive.

In April and May 1944, Allied aircraft attacked not only the railway station but also the north of Tours, with the aim of disrupting the retreat of German troops by attacking the Wilson Bridge. Saint-Julien fell victim to "stray bombs":

- The cellars and dormitories were badly damaged;
- The church's last stained-glass windows were shattered.

== Current remains of St. Julien Abbey ==
After the rubble of the collapsed buildings had been cleared away, repairs to the church and surviving abbey buildings began in 1960. It was overseen by Bernard Vitry, Architecte en chef des monuments historiques, who also distinguished himself in the restoration of the Charlemagne Tower. The cellars, chapter house, and clerks' dormitory were restored to their original condition.

All the preserved buildings of the former abbey are protected as historic monuments, as summarized in the table below.

Mérimée database	Building	Date	Protection
Notice no. PA00098130	chapter house	May 1, 1923	Ranking
Notice no. PA00098130	buildings in the east wing of the cloister	October 28, 1940	Registration
Notice no. PA00098130	cloister floor; dormitory	September 17, 1947	Ranking
Notice no. PA00098130	vaulted cellars	May 10, 1948	Ranking
Notice no. PA00098153	Saint-Julien church	1840 list	Ranking

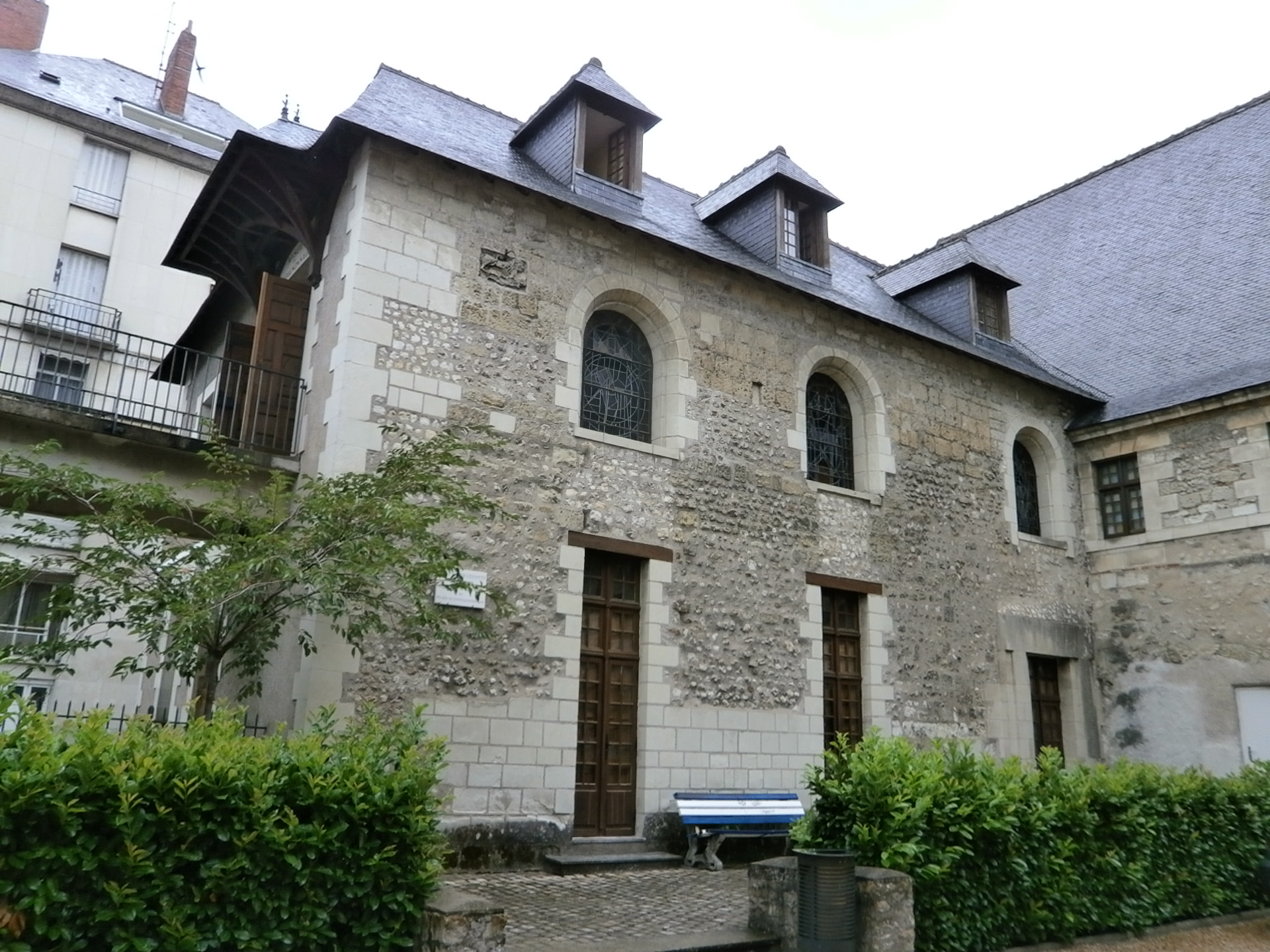
Former dormitories (Musée du Compagnonnage).

=== Saint-Julien de Tours church ===
In the church, the stained glass windows will be replaced, the roofs of the nave and bell tower redone and the masonry refurbished. The State, as owner, is responsible for restoration, enhancement, and maintenance. Cleared of the houses that once surrounded it, the church is clearly visible from the cloister to the south, east and north. Only its forecourt, clearly below Rue Nationale, offers a limited view of the tower porch.

In 2004, a stone from the vault fell inside the church, which was immediately closed to the public. This was followed by a long period of restoration and repairs, which fortunately came to an end in 2011 with the reopening of the building. In 2012, it's the turn of the tower-porch to benefit from a "heavy" restoration project, involving both the shell and the roof; further "emergency" work will be carried out on the transept's buttresses and crossbeam.

A new project is due to begin shortly: with the arrival of the tramway in Tours, the entire architecture of the Loire frontage at the entrance to Rue Nationale is due to be redesigned, including landscaping to open up the view of the Saint-Julien facade.

=== The cellars ===
Today, they house the Musée des Vins de Touraine. A former wine press stands in the middle of the courtyard (former cloister).

=== The chapter house ===
Opening onto the former cloister, the chapter house comprises nine bays with ribbed vaults, excavated by Henry Auvray. The chapter house is now an exhibition hall.

=== The dormitory ===
The Compagnonnage Museum is housed in the clerks' dormitory. This dormitory, rebuilt in the 16th century, occupied the floor above the chapter house, with a corner return in the north wing of the cloister.

== See also ==
- Tours

== Bibliography ==
- Chevalier, Bernard (1985). Histoire de Tours (in French). Privat. ISBN 2-70898-224-9.
- Croubois, Claude (1986). L'indre-et-Loire – La Touraine, des origines à nos jours. L'histoire par les documents (in French). Bordessoules. ISBN 2-90350-409-1.
- Ranjard, Robert (1986). La Touraine archéologique (in French). Imprimerie de la Manutention. ISBN 2-85554-017-8.
