= Luca Paiva Mello =

Brazilian creator and showrunner

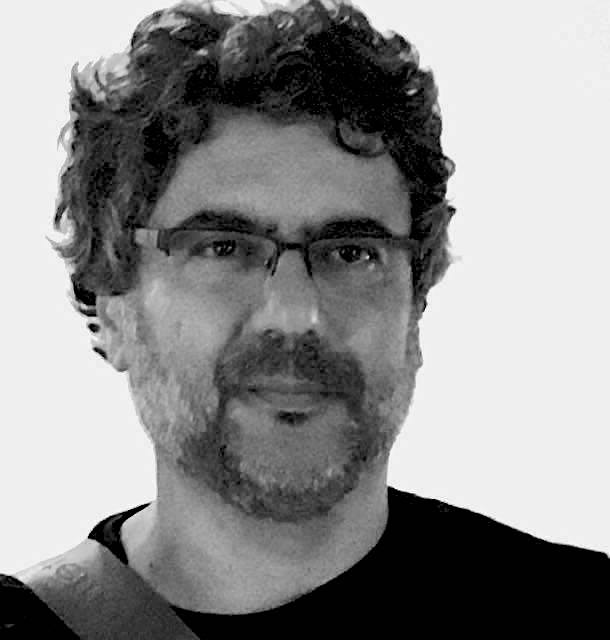
Luca Paiva Mello

Luca Paiva Mello (born Rio de Janeiro) is a Brazilian screenwriter, television producer and showrunner. He was nominated for the International Emmy® Award twice and is responsible for successful projects such as O Negócio (HBO), Mothern (GNT), Julie e os Fantasmas (Nickelodeon/Band), Descolados (MTV Brasil/Band), Copa do Caos (MTV/TV Cultura), A Vida de Rafinha Bastos (Fox), among others. Luca is currently a partner and Head of Development of Scriptonita Films, a producing company located in São Paulo.

== Career ==
Luca started his career in 1984, as a screenwriter for TV Manchete. He worked at companies like FilmPlanet, Radar TV, Cinema 8, CMT International, and Mixer.

As a showrunner, Luca has developed and produced over 200 dramas, comedies, sitcoms, children’s/youth comedy and dramedy episodes; reaching artistic and commercial recognition.

Created by Luca, the show “O Negócio” is broadcast by HBO in all of Latin America, the U.S., Europe and Asia. The show is the biggest Latin-American hit in HBO's history and has finished airing its fourth season.

Mothern aired its three seasons on GNT and was nominated for the International Emmy® Award, being broadcast in 114 countries by Globo Internacional.

The winner of the APCA/2012 best children’s/youth series award, Julie e os Fantasmas was a success on broadcast television (Band), cable television (Nickelodeon) and VoD (Netflix). Exported to thirty countries and dubbed for Spanish and Italian, the series also was nominated for the International Emmy® Kids Awards in 2012.

For MTV Brasil, Luca created the young-adult drama Descolados, also broadcast by Band. The show was nominated for the FIPA - Festival International de Programmes Audiovisuels in Biarritz, in the “Best Fiction Series” category, along with the BBC (British Broadcasting Corporation) show Occupation and Nurse Jackie. Descolados was also licensed by Netflix.

For the FX Channel, Luca created and directed the dramedy A Vida De Rafinha Bastos, an hour-long special co-produced by Fox.

Luca was the only Latin-American member and curator of the Input - International Public Television, in Johannesburg. Input organizes international conferences and displays the best productions from around the world, favoring innovative formats and promoting an annual debate with directors, producers, and programmers interested in defending quality television made to serve the public.

He was also a partner and developing director for Mixer, a producing company situated in São Paulo. Besides his award-winning dramaturgy work, Luca created the TNT+Filmes format for Turner, which is a mix between a quiz show and a cinema magazine, made for the TNT Channel. The format was a success and became an international project, being produced simultaneously for Argentina, Mexico, Venezuela, and Brazil.

Luca is a jury member of the International Emmy® Awards and a member of the International Academy of Television Arts & Sciences. He is also a consultant in the dramaturgy area of NETLABTV. He is a permanent counselor of RBS/Globo TV’s “Academia de Histórias Curtas”, and a consultant for the GLOBO LAB and PRODAV’s Development Lab 04/2013.

In 2006, Luca founded SCRIPTONITA FILMS, a project development company that works with the management of intellectual properties. The company has developed a 52-episode children's show that premiered in 2019; a 10-episode supernatural drama; two fiction feature films; and two documentaries.

== Awards and nominations ==
- Nominated to the Emmy Awards for Best Drama Series, with Mothern (2006)
- Nominated to the Emmy Kids Awards for Best Children’s TV show, with Julie e Os Fantasmas (2012)
- Won the Prêmio APCA for Best Children’s TV show, with Julie e Os Fantasmas (2012)
- Won the NET NOW award’s TV Show Award, with O Negócio (2014)
- Won the Premio ATVC award - Asociación Argentina de Televisión por Cable’s TV Show Award, with O Negócio (2015)
- Won the Prêmio Rumos Itaú Award’s Documentary Award, with Garota Zona Sul (2003)
- Won the Prêmio da Secretaria de Estado da Cultura’s Documentary Award, with Adélia Prado - Uma Mulher Desdobrável (1993)
