= Saint-Alban, Côtes-d'Armor =

Saint-Alban Sant-Alvan
- Commune
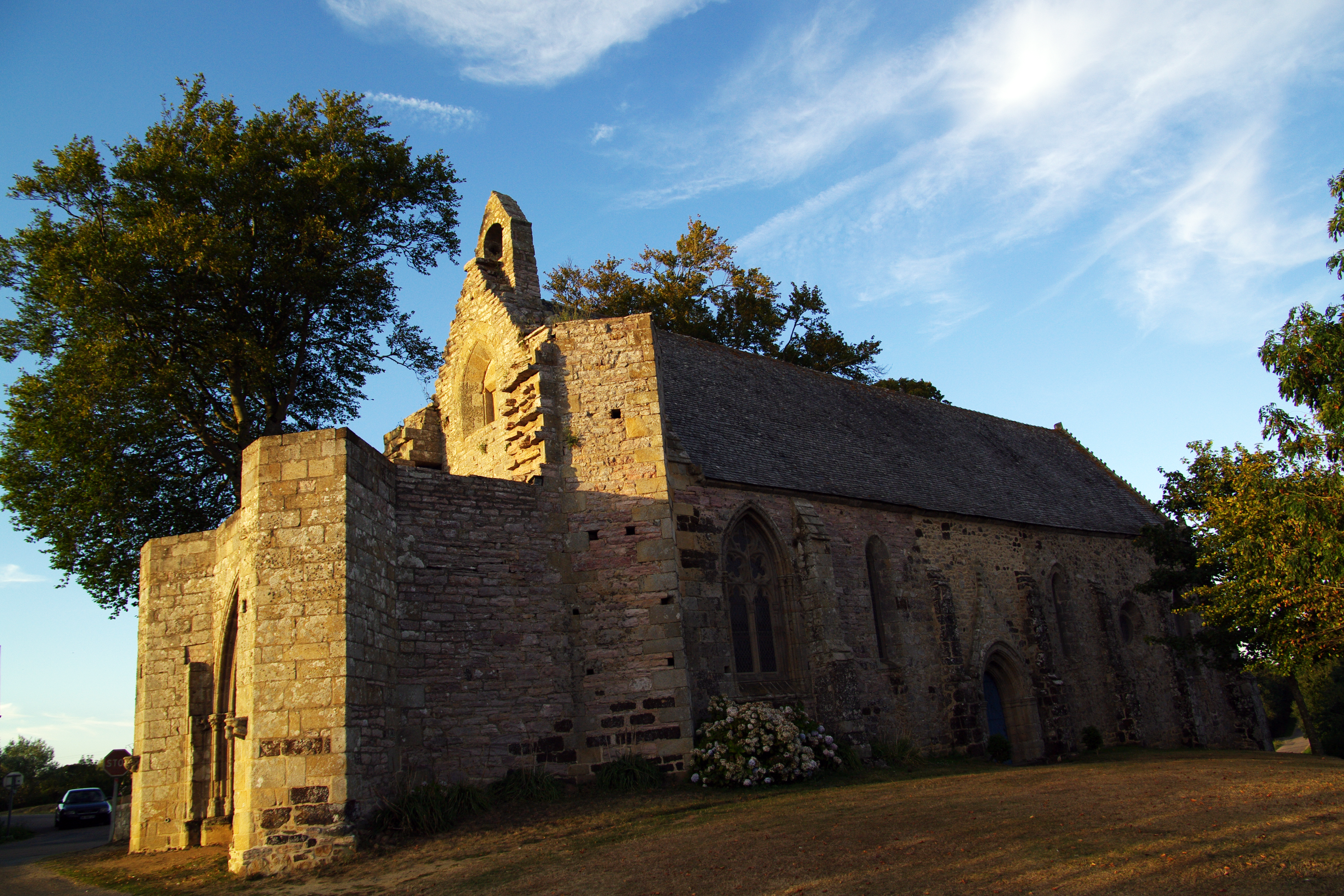
- The chapel of Saint-Jacques, in Saint-Alban

- Coat of arms
- Location of Saint-Alban
- Location within France Location within Brittany
- Coordinates: 48°33′28″N 2°32′01″W
- Country: France
- Region: Brittany
- Department: Côtes-d'Armor
- Arrondissement: Saint-Brieuc
- Canton: Pléneuf-Val-André
- Intercommunality: CA Lamballe Terre et Mer

Government
  - Mayor (2020–2026): Nathalie Beauvy
- Area^{1}: 30.43 km^{2} (11.75 sq mi)
- Highest elevation: 126 m (413 ft)
- Lowest elevation: 8 m (26 ft)
- Population (2023): 2,397
  - Density: 78.77/km^{2} (204.0/sq mi)
- Time zone: UTC+01:00 (CET)
  - Summer (DST): UTC+02:00 (CEST)
- INSEE/Postal code: 22273 /22400
- ^{1} French Land Register data, which excludes lakes, ponds, glaciers > 1 km^{2} (0.386 sq mi or 247 acres) and river estuaries.

Saint-Alban (French pronunciation: [sɛ̃.t‿albɑ̃]; Breton: Sant-Alvan; Gallo: Saent-Alban) is a commune in the Côtes-d'Armor department of Brittany in northwestern France.

== Population ==
People from Saint-Alban are called albanais in French.

Historical population
Year	Pop.	±% p.a.
1968	1,140	—
1975	1,194	+0.66%
1982	1,548	+3.78%
1990	1,662	+0.89%
1999	1,575	−0.60%
2007	1,832	+1.91%
2012	2,031	+2.08%
2017	2,154	+1.18%
2023	2,397	+1.80%
Source: INSEE

== See also ==
- Communes of the Côtes-d'Armor department
