= Brioc =

6th-century Welsh saint

Saint Brioc
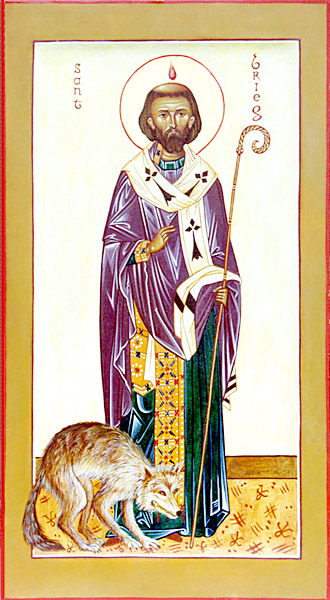
- Icon of Saint Brioc

Abbot
- Born: c. 409 AD; Ceredigion, Wales
- Died: c. 500 AD (aged 91); St Brieuc-des-Vaux, Brittany
- Venerated in: Roman Catholic Church; Eastern Orthodox Church; Anglican Communion
- Major shrine: St Brieuc-des-Vaux
- Feast: 1 May
- Patronage: Diocese of Saint-Brieuc and Tréguier

Brioc (Breton: Brieg; Welsh: Briog; Cornish: Breock; French: Brieuc; born c. 409 AD - died c. 500 AD) was a 6th-century Welsh holy man who became the first abbot of Saint-Brieuc in Brittany. He is one of the seven founder saints of Brittany.

== Life ==
Very little is known about Brioc's early life, as his 9th century Acta is not altogether reliable. It states that he came from Ceredigion where the church at Llandyfriog was originally dedicated to him. He received his education in Ireland and then studied under Germain of Paris. He is believed to have spent time at Rothesay on the Isle of Bute in Scotland, where a church was dedicated to him and his name was commemorated in the annual St. Bruix Fair.

At some point in the sixth century, he settled in Armorica, and founded a monastery at Landebaeron. He then traveled to Upper Brittany where he established an oratory at St Brieuc-des-Vaux, between St. Malo and Land Triguier, where he eventually became the abbot of a monastery.

Authorities differ as to date of Brioc's death, but it was probably in the late sixth century. He died in his own monastery at St. Brieuc-des-Vaux and was interred in his cathedral church, dedicated to Saint Stephen.

== Veneration ==
His Acta cites numerous miracles, especially his cure of Count Riguel, who gave Brioc his own Palace of Champ-du-Rouvre as also the whole manorial estates. He is represented as treading on a dragon or presented with a column of fire as seen at his ordination.

Brioc's relics were moved to the Church of Saints Sergius and Bacchus of Angers in 865, and again, in a more solemn manner, on 31 July 1166. However, in 1210, a portion of the relics was restored to St. Brieuc Cathedral, where Brioc's ring is also preserved.

In honour of Brioc's link between Ceredigion and Brittany, the town of St Brieuc has been twinned with Aberystwyth since 1974 and a road, Boulevard St Brieuc, is located in the town.

His feast day is 1 May. The festival of Saint Brioc was celebrated on 1 May, but in 1804, the festival has been held on the second Sunday after Easter. Churches in England, Ireland, and Scotland are dedicated to this early Celtic saint, including the parish church of St Breock in Cornwall.

He is considered the patron saint of pursemakers.

== See also ==
- Julian Maunoir, "Apostle of Brittany"
- Breage, reputed founder of Breage, Cornwall
- Brixham, thought to be named for Brioc, possibly St Brioc
- Chronological list of saints in the 6th century
- List of Breton saints
- List of Catholic saints
- List of Welsh saints
- St Briavels, Gloucestershire, believed to be named for St Brioc
- Tudy of Landevennec
