= 2026 Multishow Brazilian Music Awards =

33rd edition of the Multishow Brazilian Music Awards

- Date: 9 December 2026
- Location: Farmasi Arena, Rio de Janeiro, Rio de Janeiro, Brazil
- Hosted by: Tadeu Schmidt and Kenya Sade

Highlights
- Most nominations: Anitta (10)
- Website: gshow.globo.com/multishow/premio-multishow

Television/radio coverage
- Network: Multishow; TV Globo; Globoplay

The 2026 Multishow Brazilian Music Awards (Portuguese: Prêmio Multishow de Música Brasileira 2026) (or simply 2026 Multishow Awards) (Portuguese: Prêmio Multishow 2026) will be held on 9 December 2026, at the Farmasi Arena in Rio de Janeiro. Tadeu Schmidt and Kenya Sade will host the ceremony. Belo and Gaby Amarantos will presented awards. The show will be broadcast on Multishow and TV Globo and streamed on Globoplay.

The ceremony will recognize artists and works released between 15 October 2025 to 31 August 2026. Anitta was the most nominated artist, with ten nominations. Alceu Valença will be honored with the Special Award of the Year.

== Background ==
In September 2026, details of the 33rd edition of the Multishow Brazilian Music Awards were revealed; the ceremony would take place on 9 December 2026. It will be held at the Farmasi Arena in Rio de Janeiro. Tadeu Schmidt and Kenya Sade returning as hosts. The duo would host the ceremony for the second consecutive year, marking Schmidt's fourth time in the role and Sade's third. Belo and Gaby Amarantos were also announced as awards presenters.

Alceu Valença was announced as the recipient of the Special Award for his lifetime achievement, with Elba Ramalho, Geraldo Azevedo, João Gomes and Mestrinho performing Valença songs. Anitta, Xande de Pilares and Grupo Revelação were also announced as performers. With Joana Thimoteo as genre director, Marcelo Amiky as general director, Valesca Campos as executive producer and Nicolas Rebouças overseeing production, the ceremony will be broadcast live on Multishow and TV Globo and streamed on Globoplay.

== Performances ==
List of performers at the 2026 Multishow Brazilian Music Awards
Artist(s)	Song(s)
Anitta	TBA
Elba Ramalho Geraldo Azevedo João Gomes Mestrinho	Tribute to Alceu Valença
Xande de Pilares Grupo Revelação	TBA

== Nominees ==
The nominees were announced on 9 November 2026. Anitta led with ten nominations, followed by João Gomes, with six. Jão, Jota.pê and Marina Sena received five nominations each.

Artist of the Year: Anitta; Jão; João Gomes; Marina Sena; Panda; Pedro Sampaio	Album of the Year: Criolo, Amaro e Dino – Criolo, Amaro Freitas and Dino D'Santiago; Dominguinho Vol. 2 (Ao Vivo) – João Gomes, Mestrinho and Jota.pê; Emicida Racional VoL.2: Mesmas Cores e Mesmos Valores – Emicida; Equilibrivm I and II – Anitta; Improviso – Djavan; Jota Quest & Tim Maia – Dance Enquanto é Tempo – Jota Quest; Memórias Póstumas – Jão
TVZ Music Video of the Year: "Acenda o Farol" – Jota Quest and Tim Maia; "Até Outro Dia Amor" – Jota.pê; "Carnaval" – Marina Sena and Psirico; "Catedral" – Jão; "Desgraça" – Anitta; "O Que a Julia Vai Ser?" – Ajulliacosta and Maffalda	Hit of the Year: "Arrependidaço (Onde Você Anda)" – Ferrugem; "Aurora" – Jão; "Cadeira Cativa (Ao Vivo)" – Zé Neto & Cristiano; "Carnaval" – Marina Sena and Psirico; "Desgraça" – Anitta; "Jetski" – Pedro Sampaio, MC Meno K and Melody; "P.I.T.T.Y. (Parecendo Uma Cafetina) " – NandaTsunami, Stick, Bvga Beatz and Torelli; "Peão Todo Tatuado" – Jeninho and Mariana Fagundes
New Artist of the Year: Budah; Ebony; Flor Gil; Juliana Linhares; Mariana Fagundes; NandaTsunami	Brazil Category: Bela Maria (Northeast); Duda Brack (South); Jean Tassy (Central-West); Lourena (Southeast); Victor Xamã (North)
Instrumentalist of the Year: Amaro Freitas; Ana Karina Sebastião; Hamilton de Holanda; Jonathan Ferr; Mestrinho; Pretinho da Serrinha	Show of the Year: Bye Bye Caju – Liniker; Castelos & Ruínas 10 anos – BK'; Djavanear 50 Anos - Só Sucessos – Djavan; Dominguinho Vol. 2 (Ao Vivo) – João Gomes, Mestrinho and Jota.pê; Equilibrivm Tour – Anitta; O maior encontro do samba – Zeca Pagodinho, Alcione and Jorge Aragão; Rock Doido Tour – Gaby Amarantos
Axé/Pagodão of the Year: "Beija-flor (Ao Vivo)" – Timbalada and João Gomes; "É Terreiro" – Daniela Mercury and Alcione; "Ginga Olodum " – Olodum and BaianaSystem; "Hipnotiza " – Diggo and Leo Santana; "Marquinha de Fitinha (Ao Vivo)" – Leo Santana; "Vampirinha (Ao Vivo" ) – Ivete Sangalo	Brega/Arrocha of the Year: "Até Quando (Ao Vivo)" – Natanzinho Lima; "Clima de Rodeio" – Gaby Amarantos; "Fanatismo" – Yasmin Sensação; "Não Me Faça Chorar - Ao Vivo" – Priscila Senna and Pablo; "O Rosto E O Resto" – Grelo; "Saudade do Carai" – Mari Fernandezfeaturing Grelo and Natanzinho Lima; "Só Pra Tu " – Anitta and Viviane Batidão
Forró/Piseiro of the Year: "Aproveita Que Eu Tô Brigado (Ao Vivo)" – Nattan and Zé Vaqueiro; "Deixo" – Léo Foguete; "Deusa Minha (Ao Vivo)" – João Gomes, Mestrinho and Jota.pê; "Devagar, Sem Pressa" – João Gomes; "O Que Sobrou Do Amor? (Versão Forró)" – Carol Biazin and Léo Foguete; "Raparigas" – Filho do Piseiro	Funk of the Year: "Amo Minha Favela" – DJ Japa NK e MC Meno K; "Carnaval" – Marina Sena and Psirico; "GOSTOSIN " – Anitta, Felipe Amorim and Hitmaker; "Jetski " – Pedro Sampaio, MC Meno K and Melody; "Manga Rosa" – MC Hariel and DJ Glenner; "Pilantra" – Dennis, MC Kevin o Chris and Henry Freitas; "QUANDO VOCÊ SE FOI CHOREI (SORRI, SOU REI) " – DJ TOPO, Natiruts, Yuri R e Ryuchi
Gospel of the Year: "Ah, Jesus / Coração Igual Ao Teu" – Julliany Souza; "Casa" – Rosa de Saron; "Gratidão" – Thalles Roberto; "Ídolos (Ao Vivo)" – Eli Soares; "Ovelha em Treinamento" – Isadora Pompeo; "Um Novo Dia" – Pregador Luo, Expressão Ativa and Cuca Beats	MPB of the Year: "Bemba" – Anitta and Luedji Luna; "Blues da Piedade (Ao Vivo)" – Chico Chico; "Eu e Você" – Iza and Jota.pê; "Melhor Notícia" – Liniker; "O Vento" – Djavan; "Pra Você Guardei O Amor" – Nando Reis and Marisa Monte
Urban Song of the Year: "Moça" – Xamã and Ludmilla; "P.I.T.T.Y. (Parecendo Uma Cafetina) " – NandaTsunami, Stick, Byga Beatz and Torelli; "Que Eu Sofra" – Baco Exu do Blues and Zeca Veloso; "Rap da Lealdade" – Filipe Ret; "US MEMO PRETO ZICA" – Emicida, Amaro Freitas and Henrique Albino; "VIP (Ninguém Te Conhece) " – Budah and Duquesa	Pop of the Year: "Acenda o Farol " – Jota Quest and Tim Maia; "Aurora" – Jão; "CHARME" – Liniker; "Choka Choka" – Anitta and Shakira; "Desgraça" – Anitta; "Saí Pra Ver O Mar " – Marina Sena and Rachel Reis
Rock of the Year: "30 Anos Depois" – CPM 22; "Continental" – Black Pantera; "Cuida " – Di Ferrero; "Fogo Nos Racistas (Ao Vivo no Circo Voador)" – Black Pantera; "O Pulso (Ao Vivo)" – Arnaldo Antunes; "Você Me Ama De Verdade?" – Capital Inicial	Samba/Pagode of the Year: "Arrependidaço (Onde Você Anda)" – Ferrugem; "Brinda Aê (Ao Vivo)" – Grupo Menos é Mais; "Me Balançou (Ao Vivo)" – Thiaguinho; "Pisa Como Eu Pisei" – Teresa Cristina; "Pra Você Acreditar (Ao Vivo)" – Péricles; "Vice-versa" – Zeca Pagodinho
Sertanejo of the Year: "90/10 (Ao Vivo em São Paulo)" – Maiara & Maraisa; "Cadeira Cativa (Ao Vivo)" – Zé Neto & Cristiano; "Direitos Iguais (Ao Vivo)" – Simone Mendes; "É Que Eu Não Te Esqueci" – Ana Castela; "Peão Todo Tatuado" – Jeninho and Mariana Fagundes; "Pra Você Lembrar De Mim (Ao Vivo)" – Lauana Prado and Murilo Huff

=== Special award ===
Special Award of the Year
Alceu Valença

== Artists with nominations ==
Artists who received multiple nominations
Nominations	Artist
10	Anitta
6	João Gomes
5	Jão
5	Jota.pê
5	Marina Sena
4	Mestrinho
3	Amaro Freitas
3	Djavan
3	Jota Quest
3	Liniker
3	Mariana Fagundes
3	MC Meno K
3	NandaTsunami
3	Pedro Sampaio
3	Psirico
2	Alcione
2	Black Pantera
2	Budah
2	Bvga Beatz
2	Emicida
2	Ferrugem
2	Gaby Amarantos
2	Grelo
2	Jeninho
2	Léo Foguete
2	Leo Santana
2	Melody
2	Natanzinho Lima
2	Stick
2	Tim Maia
2	Torelli
2	Zeca Pagodinho
2	Zé Neto & Cristiano
