= 2025 Multishow Brazilian Music Awards =

32nd edition of the Multishow Brazilian Music Awards

- Date: 9 December 2025
- Location: Farmasi Arena, Rio de Janeiro, Rio de Janeiro, Brazil
- Hosted by: Tadeu Schmidt and Kenya Sade

Highlights
- Most awards: João Gomes and Mestrinho (4 each)
- Most nominations: Ana Castela, João Gomes, Jota.pê, Marina Sena, Mestrinho and Zé Felipe (6 each)
- Website: gshow.globo.com/multishow/premio-multishow

Television/radio coverage
- Network: Multishow; TV Globo; Globoplay
- Produced by: Ana Schmidt; Nicolas Rebouças
- Directed by: Marcelo Amiky; Renan de Andrade

The 2025 Multishow Brazilian Music Awards (Portuguese: Prêmio Multishow de Música Brasileira 2025) (or simply 2025 Multishow Awards) (Portuguese: Prêmio Multishow 2025) were held on 9 December 2025, at the Farmasi Arena in Rio de Janeiro. The ceremony was broadcast on Multishow and TV Globo and streamed on Globoplay. Tadeu Schmidt and Kenya Sade hosted the show.

The nominations were announced in November 2025. Ana Castela, João Gomes, Jota.pê, Marina Sena, Mestrinho and Zé Felipe received the most nominations with six each. Gomes and Mestrinho were the most awarded of the night, with four wins each, followed by Jota.pê with three, while Menos é Mais and Simone Mendes won two. Gilberto Gil was honored with the Special Award of the Year.

== Performances ==
The performers were announced on 26 November 2025. New performers were announced on 3 December.

List of performers at the 2025 Multishow Brazilian Music Awards
Artist(s)	Song(s)
João Gomes Jota.pê Mestrinho	"Lembrei de Nós" "Beija Flor" "Arriadin por Tu"
Roberta Miranda	"Majestade o Sabiá"
Ana Castela	"As Cowgirls" "Olha Onde Eu Tô"
Maria Marçal Thalles Roberto	"Cura" (Marçal) "Nada Além de Ti" (Roberto and Marçal) "Filho Meu" (Roberto)
Filipe Ret	"Da Onde Eu Venho"
Marina Sena	"Numa Ilha"
Gaby Amarantos	"Eu Tô Solteira" "Foguinho"
Sorriso Maroto	"A Batucada dos Nossos Tantãs"
Arlindinho Yan	Tribute to Arlindo Cruz "Meu Lugar" "O Show Tem Que Continuar"
Ney Matogrosso Chico Buarque Herbert Vianna Maria Bethânia Roberto Carlos Caetano Veloso	Tribute to Gilberto Gil "Se Eu Quiser Falar Com Deus" "A Paz" "Drão"
Gilberto Gil	"Toda Menina Baiana" "Andar com Fé"

== Winners and nominees ==
The nominees were announced on 17 November 2025. Winners are listed first and highlighted in bold.

=== Voted categories ===
The winners of the following categories were chosen by fan votes.

TVZ Music Video of the Year	New Artist of the Year
**"Sua Boca Mente (You're Still the One)" – Zé Felipe and Ana Castela**; "Acima de Mim Só Deus" – Filipe Ret; "Lua Cheia" – Marina Sena; "Numa Ilha" – Marina Sena; "P do Pecado" – Menos é Mais and Simone Mendes; "Pote de Ouro" – Liniker and Priscila Senna	**Danilo & Davi**; Ajuliacosta; Joyce Alane; Léo Foguete; Panda; Yan
Hit of the Year	Show of the Year
**"P do Pecado" – Menos é Mais and Simone Mendes**; "Cacos de Vidro (sample: Esperar pra Ver)" – BK', Kolo and Evinha; "Foguinho" – Gaby Amarantos; "Resenha do Arrocha" – J. Eskine and Alef Donk; "Sua Boca Mente (You're Still the One)" – Zé Felipe and Ana Castela; "Tubarões" – Diego & Victor Hugo	**Jorge & Mateus (20 Anos)**; Planet Hemp (Até a Última Ponta); Liniker (Caju); João Gomes, Mestrinho and Jota.pê (Dominguinho); Gilberto Gil (Tempo Rei); Iza (The Town)
Brazil Category
**Benzadeus (Central-West)**; Bruna Black (Southeast); Zudizilla (South); Josyara (Northeast); Marília Tavares (North)

=== Professional categories ===
The winners of the following categories were chosen by the Multishow Awards Academy.

Artist of the Year	Album of the Year
**João Gomes**; Ana Castela; Gaby Amarantos; Gilberto Gil; Liniker; Menos é Mais	**Dominguinho – João Gomes, Mestrinho and Jota.pê**; Coisas Naturais – Marina Sena; Diamantes, Lágrimas e Rostos para Esquecer – BK'; O Mundo Dá Voltas – BaianaSystem; Rock Doido – Gaby Amarantos; Um Mar pra Cada Um – Luedji Luna
DJ of the Year	Music Production of the Year
**Papatinho**; Alok; Dennis; Mochakk; Pedro Sampaio; Vintage Culture	**Pretinho da Serrinha**; Dudu Borges; Eduardo Pepato; Iuri Rio Branco; Janlusca; Papatinho
Instrumentalist of the Year	Cover Art of the Year
**Mestrinho**; Amaro Freitas; Hamilton de Holanda; Hermeto Pascoal; Jonathan Ferr; Pretinho da Serrinha	**Dominguinho – João Gomes, Mestrinho and Jota.pê**; Carranca – Urias; Coisas Naturais – Marina Sena; Diamantes, Lágrimas e Rostos para Esquecer – BK'; O Mundo da Voltas – BaianaSystem; Rock Doido – Gaby Amarantos
Arrocha of the Year	Axé/Pagodão of the Year
**"Resenha do Arrocha" – J. Eskine and Alef Donk**; "Mãe Solteira" – DG e Batidão Stronda, MC Davi, J. Eskine and MC G15; "Me Apaixonei Nessa Morena" – Natanzinho Lima, MC Tato and Gabb MC; "Não Era Love" – Luan Pereira, Grelo and MC Tuto; "Saudade Top 1" – Unha Pintada; "Vou Começar a Não Prestar" – Theuzinho and Nadson o Ferinha	**"O Baiano Tem o Molho" – O Kannalha**; "Desliza (Ólhinho no Corpinho)" – Leo Santana and Melody; "Energia de Gostosa" – Ivete Sangalo; "Hoje Eu Vou Te Usar" – Tília, Kadu Martins, MC Daniel, Leo Santana and DG e Batidão Stronda; "O Verão Bateu em Minha Porta" – Ivete Sangalo; "Surra de Toma" – Leo Santana
Brega of the Year	Forró/Piseiro of the Year
**"Foguinho" – Gaby Amarantos**; "Apostar em Você" – Luan Pereira, Zé Felipe and MC Tuto; "Bailão" – Zé Felipe and Grelo; "Desabafo de Um Jovem Adulto" – Grelo; "Pense o Que Quiser de Mim" – Raphaela Santos and Wesley Safadão; "Sonho de Amor" – Natanzinho Lima	**"Beija Flor" – João Gomes, Mestrinho and Jota.pê**; "Cópia Proibida" – Léo Foguete; "Eu Me Apaixonei" – Vitinho Imperador; "Lembrei de Nós" – João Gomes, Mestrinho and Jota.pê; "Melzinho" – Talita Mel and Xand Avião; "Tudo Vai Dar Certo" – Raí Saia Rodada
Funk of the Year	Gospel of the Year
**"Bota um Funk" – Pedro Sampaio, Anitta and MC GW**; "Famosinha" – MC Rodrigo do CN, MC Meno K and DJ Caio Vieira; "Motinha 2.0 (Mete Marcha)" – Dennis and Luísa Sonza; "Oh Garota Eu Quero Você Só pra Mim" – Oruam, Zé Felipe, MC Tuto, MC Rodrigo do CN, DJ Lc da Roça, MC K9 and MC PL Alves; "Sequência Feiticeira" – Pedro Sampaio, MC GW, MC Rodrigo do CN, MC Jhey and MC Nito; "Vou Raspar Seu Bigodin" – MC Dricka and DJ S2k	**"Fé para o Impossível" – Eli Soares**; "Avenida do Arrependimento" – Thalles Roberto and Jorge; "Dependente de Deus" – Isadora Pompeo; "O Leão" – Ton Carfi; "Quem É Esse" – Julliany Souza; "Santo pra Sempre" – Fernandinho
MPB of the Year	Urban Song of the Year
**"Apocalipse" – Luedji Luna, Seu Jorge, Arthur Verocai and Fejuca**; "Açaí" – Jota.pê; "Fé (Ao vivo)" – Caetano Veloso and Maria Bethânia; "Infinito em Nós" – Zé Ibarra; "Sua Onda" – Marisa Monte; "Um Brinde" – Djavan	**"Cacos de Vidro (sample: Esperar pra Ver)" – BK', Kolo and Evinha**; "Amina" – Tasha & Tracie; "Dharma" – Ajuliacosta, KL Jay and Maffalda; "Fuso" – Duquesa and Go Dassisti; "Lido com Crises" – Ryu, the Runner, Vulgo FK, Neckklace and 6ee; "Talvez Você Precise de Mim" – Veigh
Pop of the Year	Rock of the Year
**"Numa Ilha" – Marina Sena**; "Caos e Sal" – Iza; "Despacha" – Melly; "É Arte" – Lexa and MC Kevin o Chris; "Lua Cheia" – Marina Sena; "Você Vai Gostar" – Duda Beat and Ajuliacosta	**"Dig Dig RMX/Duas Cidades" – Planet Hemp and BaianaSystem**; "A Cidade" – Lagum; "Além do Fim" – Di Ferrero; "Nada Igual" – Terno Rei; "Nunca Tenha Medo RMX" – Planet Hemp, Seu Jorge and Emicida; "Toda Garota Como Eu" – Duquesa and Iorigun
Samba/Pagode of the Year	Sertanejo of the Year
**"P do Pecado" – Menos é Mais and Simone Mendes**; "Apagar (Fundo Raso") – Ferrugem; "Duvido" – Turma do Pagode, Ferrugem and Mumuzinho; "Fica com Deus" – Yan and Sorriso Maroto; "Pela Última Vez" – Menos é Mais and Nattan; "Vento" – Xande de Pilares	**"Tubarões" – Diego & Victor Hugo**; "Ilusão de Ótica" – Matheus & Kauan and Ana Castela; "Olha Onde Eu Tô" – Ana Castela; "Saudade Burra" – Lauana Prado and Simone Mendes; "Saudade Proibida" – Simone Mendes; "Sua Boca Mente (You're Still the One)" – Zé Felipe and Ana Castela

== Special awards ==
The Special Award of the Year recognizes excellence in Brazilian music, celebrating artists who have left their mark on history and stood out in 2025.

Special Award of the Year
Gilberto Gil

== Multiple nominations ==
The following received multiple nominations:

6 nominations

- Ana Castela
- João Gomes
- Jota.pê
- Marina Sena
- Mestrinho
- Zé Felipe

5 nominations

- Gaby Amarantos
- Menos é Mais
- Simone Mendes
