= 2024 Multishow Brazilian Music Awards =

31st edition of the Multishow Brazilian Music Awards held in 2024

- Date: 3 December 2024
- Location: Riocentro; Rio de Janeiro, Rio de Janeiro, Brazil
- Hosted by: Tatá Werneck; Tadeu Schmidt; Kenya Sade

Highlights
- Most awards: Liniker (4)
- Most nominations: Liniker (11)
- Website: gshow.globo.com/multishow/premio-multishow

Television/radio coverage
- Network: Multishow; TV Globo; Globoplay

The 2024 Multishow Brazilian Music Awards (Portuguese: Prêmio Multishow de Música Brasileira 2024) (or simply 2024 Multishow Awards) (Portuguese: Prêmio Multishow 2024) were held on 3 December 2024, at the Riocentro in Rio de Janeiro, Brazil. The ceremony was broadcast on Multishow and TV Globo and streamed on Globoplay. Tatá Werneck, Tadeu Schmidt and Kenya Sade hosted the show.

The nominations were announced on 24 October 2024; Liniker was the most nominated and awarded artist of the night, winning four out of her eleven nominations. Anitta was honored with the inaugural Vanguard Trophy.

== Background ==
On 28 June 2024, Globo announced that the 31st edition of the Multishow Awards would take place on 3 December 2024, at Riocentro, in Rio de Janeiro. Directed by Adriano Ricco and produced by Valesca Campos and Simone Lamosa, the ceremony was broadcast live on Multishow and on TV Globo for the second time. The ceremony was also available for streaming on Globoplay. In October 2024, it was confirmed that Tadeu Schmidt, Tatá Werneck, and Kenya Sade would host the ceremony.

== Performances ==
Anitta was announced as a performer on 11 November 2024. Performers for the tribute to sertanejo were announced on 19 November. Matuê and Liniker were announced on 20 November. New performers were announced on 21, 22, 25, 26 and 27 November.

List of performers at the 2024 Multishow Brazilian Music Awards
| Artist(s) | Song(s) |
|---|---|
| Sorriso Maroto Thullio Milionário Manu Bahtidão Pedro Sampaio | "Sinais" (Sorriso Maroto) "Casca de Bala" (Thullio Milionário) "Daqui Pra Frente" (Manu Bahtidão) "PocPoc" (Pedro Sampaio) |
| Jota.pê | "Ouro Marrom" |
| Os Garotin | "Queda Livre" |
| Hungria | "Amor E Fé" |
| Luan Pereira MC Daniel | "Dentro da Hilux" "Vamos de Pagodin" |
| Ebony | "Pensamentos Intrusivos" |
| MC Cabelinho | "Carta Aberta" |
| Ferrugem Gloria Groove | Tribute to pagode: "Me Bloqueia" (Ferrugem) "Nosso Primeiro Beijo" (Gloria Groove) |
| Simone Mendes | "Mulher Foda" "Dois Tristes" |
| Raça Negra | "Cheia de Manias" |
| Isadora Pompeo | "Bênçãos Que Não Têm Fim" |
| Nattan Mari Fernandez | "Amor na Praia" (Nattan) "Página de Ex" (Mari Fernandez) "Comunicação Falhou" (Both) |
| Zezé Di Camargo César Menotti & Fabiano Lauana Prado | Tribute to sertanejo: "É o Amor" (Zezé Di Camargo) "Como um Anjo" (César Menotti & Fabiano) "Me Leva Pra Casa" "Escrito nas Estrelas" (Lauana Prado) "Saudade de Minha Terra" (Everyone) |
| Matuê | "333" |
| Liniker | "Caju" "Veludo Marrom" |
| Anitta | Vanguard Trophy Medley: "Looking for Love" "São Paulo" "Lose Ya Breath" "Savage Funk" "Menina Má" |

== Presenters ==
The following individuals, listed in order of appearance, presented awards:

Red carpet

- Dedé Teicher, Guilherme Guedes and Laura Vicente ― presented the awards for Instrumentalist of the Year, Album Cover of the Year and Music Production of the Year

Main ceremony

- Clara Moneke and Maria Gadú ― Presented the award for MPB of the Year
- Preta Gil, Gominho and Pocah ― Presented the award for TVZ Music Video of the Year
- MC Carol and Lellê ― Presented the award for Funk of the Year
- Kenya Sade ― Presented the award for Brega of the Year
- Tadeu Schmidt ― Presented the award for DJ of the Year
- Charles Gavin and Evelyn Castro ― Presented the award for Rock of the Year
- Tadeu Schmidt and Tatá Werneck ― Presented the award for Show of the Year
- Tadeu Schmidt ― Presented the award for Hit of the Year
- Viviane Araújo and Diogo Nogueira ― Presented the award for Samba and Pagode of the Year
- Lauana Prado and David Junior ― Presented the award for Brazil Category
- Zezé Di Camargo and Alice Wegmann ― Presented the award for Sertanejo of the Year
- Isadora Cruz and Elba Ramalho ― Presented the award for Forró and Piseiro of the Year
- Cauã Reymond and Melly ― Presented the award for New Artist
- Tadeu Schmidt and Tatá Werneck ― Presented the award for Axé and Padodão of the Year
- Xamã and Juan Paiva ― Presented the award for Urban Music of the Year
- Sandy and Maisa ― Presented the award for Pop of the Year
- Patrícia Ramos and Kleber Lucas ― Presented the award for Gospel of the Year
- Tadeu Schmidt and Tatá Werneck ― Presented the award for Album of the Year
- Tony Tornado and Kenya Sade ― Presented the award for Artist of the Year
- Fernanda Abreu ― Presented the Vanguard Trophy

== Winners and nominees ==
The nominations were announced on 24 October 2024. Liniker led with eleven, followed by Anitta, Gloria Groove and Pabllo Vittar with five, and Grelo , Ivete Sangalo, Jão, Jota.pê, Ludmilla, Matuê and Yago Oproprio who had four nominations each. Liniker won the most awards of the night with four, followed by Anitta with three, and Lauana Prado with two. Winners are listed first and highlighted in bold.

=== Voted categories ===
The winners of the following categories were chosen by fan votes.

| TVZ Music Video of the Year | New Artist of the Year |
|---|---|
| **"Mil Veces" – Anitta**; "Carta Aberta" – MC Cabelinho; "La Noche" – Yago Oproprio; "O Som" – Matuê; "Sagrado Profano" – Luísa Sonza (featuring Kayblack); "Tudo" – Liniker | **Zaynara**; Duquesa; Grelo; Jota.pê; Os Garotin; Yago Oproprio |
| Hit of the Year | Show of the Year |
| **"Escrito nas Estrelas" – Lauana Prado**; "Caju" – Liniker; "Macetando" – Ivete Sangalo and Ludmilla; "Nosso Primeiro Beijo" – Gloria Groove; "São Amores" – Pabllo Vittar; "Só Fé" – Grelo | **Jão – SuperTurnê and Rock in Rio 2024**; Caetano & Bethânia; Ivete Sangalo – 3.0: A Festa and Rock in Rio 2024; Iza – Rock in Rio 2024; Ludmilla – Numanice #3 Tour and Rock in Rio 2024; Planet Hemp – Baseado em Fatos Reais: 30 anos de Fumaça and Rock in Rio 2024 |
Brazil Category
**Viviane Batidão (North)**; Sued Nunes (Northeast); Thauane (Central-West); Vitor Limma (South); Yan (Southeast)

=== Professional categories ===
The winners of the following categories were chosen by the Multishow Awards Academy.

| Artist of the Year | Album of the Year |
|---|---|
| **Liniker**; Ana Castela; Anitta; Gloria Groove; Jão; Matuê | **Caju – Liniker**; 333 – Matuê; Funk Generation – Anitta; Rosa – Samuel Rosa; Se o Meu Peito Fosse o Mundo – Jota.pê; Serenata da GG, Vol. 1 – Gloria Groove |
| Cover Art of the Year | Instrumentalist of the Year |
| **Caju – Liniker**; Funk Generation – Anitta; Oproprio – Yago Oproprio; Serenata da GG, Vol. 1 – Gloria Groove; Tara e Tal – Duda Beat; Topo da Minha Cabeça – Tássia Reis | **Amaro Freitas**; Hamilton de Holanda; Hermeto Pascoal; Jonathan Ferr; Pretinho da Serrinha; Rafael Castilhol |
| Music Production of the Year | Arrocha of the Year |
| **Pretinho da Serrinha**; Eduardo Pepato; Gustavo Ruiz Chagas; Julio Fejuca; Rafael Castilhol; Iuri Rio Branco | **"Só Fé" – Grelo**; "5 da Manhã" – Natanzinho Lima; "Arrasada" – Heitor Costa; "De Graça ou Pagando" – Grelo; "Mentira Estampada na Cara" – Natanzinho Lima; "Oração" – Nadson o Ferinha |
| Axé/Pagodão of the Year | Brega of the Year |
| **"Macetando" – Ivete Sangalo and Ludmilla**; "Nego Doce" – O Kannalha; "Perna Bamba" – Parangolé (featuring Leo Santana); "Seus Recados" – Ivete Sangalo and Liniker; "Tá Gostosin" – Àttøøxxá and É o Tchan!; "Tranca Rua" – Àttøøxxá (featuring Baco Exu do Blues) | **"Daqui pra Sempre" – Manu Bahtidão and Simone Mendes**; "Me Libera" – Gaby Amarantos (featuring Banda Uó); "Não Vou Te Deixar" – Gaby Amarantos and Pabllo Vittar; "Outra Vez" – Raidol and Viviane Batidão; "Quem Manda em Mim" – Zaynara (featuring Pabllo Vittar); "Sobrou pra Você" – AQNO |
| DJ of the Year | Forró/Piseiro of the Year |
| **Alok**; Anna; Mochakk; Mu540; Paulete Lindacelva; Pedro Sampaio | **"Casca de Bala" – Thullio Milionário**; "Amor na Praia" – Nattan; "Beijo, Blues e Poesia" – Seu Desejo; "Coração de Vaqueiro" – João Gomes; "Maravilhosa" – Zé Vaqueiro; "Página de Ex" – Mari Fernandez |
| Funk of the Year | Gospel of the Year |
| **"Joga pra Lua" – Anitta, Dennis and Pedro Sampaio**; "MTG Quem Não Quer Sou Eu" – DJ Topo, MC Leozin, Seu Jorge and MC G15; "Recadin No Espelho" – Kevin o Chris and Luísa Sonza; "Rolé na Favela de Nave" – Oruam, Didi, DJ LC da Roça, MC K9, MC Smith and Mainstreet; "Te Maceto Depois do Baile" – DJ Zigão, DJ Lafon do Md, MC Rodrigo do CN and MC Rf; "The Box Medley Funk 2" – The Box, MC Brinquedo, MC Cebezinho, MC Laranjinha, MC Tuto and DJ Oreia | **"Bênçãos que Não Têm Fim" – Isadora Pompeo**; "Batalhas Secretas" – Ton Carfi; "Lindo Momento" – Julliany Souza; "Ovelhinha" – Isadora Pompeo; "Toda Terra" – Gabriela Rocha; "Tu és + Águas Purificadoras" – Fhop Music, Débora Rabelo and Hamilton Rabelo |
| MPB of the Year | Urban Song of the Year |
| **"Caju" – Liniker**; "Cacau" – Melly; "Feito a Maré" – Jota.pê and Gilsons; "Ouro Marrom" – Jota.pê; "Tudo" – Liniker; "Veludo Marrom" – Liniker | **"A Dança" – MC Hariel and Gilberto Gil**; "Carta Aberta" – MC Cabelinho; "Crack com Mussilon" – Matuê; "La Noche" – Yago Oproprio; "Purple Rain" – Duquesa, Yunk Vino and Go Dassisti; "Você Parece com Vergonha" – Ajuliacosta |
| Pop of the Year | Rock of the Year |
| **"São Amores" – Pabllo Vittar**; "Deixa Estar" – Liniker, Lulu Santos and Pabllo Vittar; "Mal" – Jão and Gustavo Mioto; "O Triste É Que Eu Te Amo" – Jão; "PocPoc" – Pedro Sampaio; "Sagrado Profano" – Luísa Sonza (featuring Kayblack) | **"Do Tamanho da Vida" – Barão Vermelho and Cazuza**; "Dentes Amarelos" – Dead Fish; "Eu Nunca Fui Embora" – Fresno; "Labirinto da Memória" – Dead Fish; "Perpétuo" – Black Pantera; "Tradução" – Black Pantera |
| Samba/Pagode of the Year | Sertanejo of the Year |
| **"Nosso Primeiro Beijo" – Gloria Groove**; "Apaguei pra Todos" – Ferrugem and Sorriso Maroto; "Coração Partido" – Menos é Mais; "Febre" – Liniker and Thiaguinho; "Maliciosa" – Ludmilla; "Me Bloqueia" – Ferrugem | **"Escrito nas Estrelas" – Lauana Prado**; "Dois Tristes" – Simone Mendes; "Gosta de Rua" – Felipe & Rodrigo; "Haverá Sinais" – Jorge & Mateus and Lauana Prado; "Mulher Foda" – Simone Mendes; "Xonei" – Jorge & Mateus and Henrique & Juliano |

== Special awards ==
Anitta was announced as the recipient of the Vanguard Thophy on 20 November 2024, becoming the first artist to receive the honor.

Vanguard Thophy
Anitta
