= WME Awards 2025 =

9th edition of the Woman's Music Event Awards

- Date: 17 December 2025
- Location: BTG Pactual Hall; São Paulo, Brazil
- Hosted by: Sarah Oliveira, Teresa Cristina and Karol Conká
- Most awards: Gaby Amarantos (2)
- Most nominations: Gaby Amarantos (3)
- Website: premio.womensmusicevent.com.br/2025/

The WME Awards 2025 were held on 17 December 2025, at the BTG Pactual Hall, in São Paulo, Brazil. Powered by Billboard Brasil magazine, the ceremony recognized women in Brazilian music. The event was hosted by Sarah Oliveira, Teresa Cristina and Karol Conká. The show was broadcast on the magazine's and Preta Gil's YouTube channels. Gil was honored. Gaby Amarantos was the most nominated and awarded artist, winning two out of three nominations.

== Winners and nominees ==
The nominees were announced on 12 November 2025. Winners are listed first and highlighted in bold.

=== Popular vote ===
The winners of the following categories were chosen by fan votes.

Album	Singer
**Rock Doido – Gaby Amarantos**; Coisas Naturais – Marina Sena; Six – Duquesa; Um Mar pra Cada Um – Luedji Luna; Pagode da Mart'nália – Mart'nália	**Luedji Luna**; Ana Castela; Rachel Reis; Gaby Amarantos; Simone Mendes
DJ	Alternative Song
**DJ Méury**; Curol; Afreekassia; Samhara; Paulete Lindacelva	**"Dharma" – Ajuliacosta**; "Deus" – Urias and Criolo; "Sol na Pele" – Jadsa; "Despacha" – Melly; "Desconforto" – Stefanie
Latin American Song	Mainstream Song
**"Bunda" – Emilia and Luísa Sonza**; "Si Antes Te Hubiera Conocido" – Karol G; "Cancionera" – Natalia Lafourcade; "Soltera" – Shakira; "Perfectas" – Emilia	**"Saudade Proibida" – Simone Mendes**; "Pé na Rua" – Mari Fernandez; "Numa Ilha" – Marina Sena; "Olha Onde Eu Tô" – Ana Castela; "Energia de Gostosa" – Ivete Sangalo
New Artist	Show
Ebony; Rayane e Rafaela; Fiorella; Marília Tavares; Joyce Alane	Joelma; Duquesa; Liniker; Lauana Prado; Viviane Batidão
Music Video
**"Banquete" – Vivi**; **Rock Doido – Gaby Amarantos**; "Receita" – Pepita and Diego Martins; "Dilemas da Vida Moderna" – Carol Biazin; "Como Posso Amar Assim" – Iza

=== Technical vote ===
The winners of the following categories were chosen by the WME Awards ambassadors.

Songwriter	Music Video Director
**Liniker**; MC Tha; Bia Marques; Stefanie; Tállia	**Pamela Martins**; Letícia Ribeiro; Aline Lata; Gabriela Grafolin; Belinha Lopes
Music Entrepreneur	Instrumentalist
**Paula Lavigne**; Mara Natacci; Silvia Colmenero; Karla Martins; Raquel Virgínia	**Ana Karina Sebastião**; Alana Alberg; Victória dos Santos; Beatriz Sena; Lívia Mattos
Music Journalist	Music Producer
**Semayat Oliveira**; Isadora Almeida; Sylvia Sussekind; Carol Prado; Bia Aparecida	**Jadsa**; Curol; Luiza Brina; Alejandra Luciani; Maria Beraldo
Professional of the Year	Radio Presenter
**Silvia Stocker**; Luciana Paulino; Ede Cury; Carol Pascoal; Mariana Abreu	**Patricia Liberato**; Juliana Molino; Val Becker; Nat/Esquema; Tatiana Ribeiro
