= Multishow Brazilian Music Award for Gospel of the Year =

Brazilian music award for gospel songs

- Awarded for: Gospel songs
- Country: Brazil
- Presented by: Multishow
- First award: 2023
- Most recent winner: "Fé para o Impossível" – Eli Soares (2025)

Highlights
- Most nominations: Gabriela Rocha, Isadora Pompeo, Maria Marçal and Ton Carfi (2 each)
- Website: Official website

The Multishow Brazilian Music Award for Gospel of the Year is an award presented at the Multishow Brazilian Music Awards. The award was first presented in 2023 as Christian of the Year to Kleber Lucas and Caetano Veloso for the song "Deus Cuida de Mim". Gabriela Rocha, Isadora Pompeo, Maria Marçal and Ton Carfi holds the record for most nominations, with two each.

== History ==
For the 2023 ceremony, the Multishow Awards Academy announced several changes and introduction of new categories. The Academy has expanded to more than 900 members, composed by members of the music industry, with diversity in gender, race, color, musical genres, and region. Additionally, new categories were introduced to recognize artists and musical genres. One of these categories is Christian of the Year. The award was first presented to Kleber Lucas and Caetano Veloso for the song "Deus Cuida de Mim". In 2024, the category was renamed to Gospel of the Year.

== Recipients ==
=== 2020s ===
Recipients
Year	Winner(s)	Nominees	Ref.
2023	Kleber Lucas and Caetano Veloso – "Deus Cuida de Mim"	Maria Marçal – "Deixa"; Maria Marçal – "Deserto (Ao Vivo)"; Gabriela Rocha – "Me Atraiu"; Clovis and Ton Carfi – "Ninguém Explica Deus"; Sarah Beatriz – "Todavia Me Alegrarei (Ao Vivo)"	
2024	Isadora Pompeo – "Bênçãos Que Não Têm Fim"	Ton Carfi – "Batalhas Secretas"; Julliany Souza – "Lindo Momento"; Isadora Pompeo – "Ovelhinha"; Gabriela Rocha – "Toda Terra"; Fhop Music, Débora Rabelo and Hamilton Rabelo – "Tu és + Águas Purificadoras"	
2025	Eli Soares – "Fé para o Impossível"	Thalles Roberto and Jorge – "Avenida do Arrependimento"; Isadora Pompeo – "Dependente de Deus"; Ton Carfi – "O Leão"; Julliany Souza – "Quem É Esse"; Fernandinho – "Santo pra Sempre"	

== Artists with multiple nominations ==
2 nominations

- Gabriela Rocha
- Isadora Pompeo
- Maria Marçal
- Ton Carfi
