= Multishow Brazilian Music Award for Pop of the Year =

Brazilian music award for pop songs

- Awarded for: Pop songs
- Country: Brazil
- Presented by: Multishow
- First award: 2023
- Most recent winner: "Numa Ilha" – Marina Sena (2025)

Highlights
- Most nominations: Jão (4)
- Website: Official website

The Multishow Brazilian Music Award for Pop of the Year is an award presented at the Multishow Brazilian Music Awards, to artists for pop songs. The award was first presented to Iza and MC Carol for the song "Fé nas Maluca" in 2023. Jão holds the record for most nominations, with four.

== History ==
For the 2023 ceremony, the Multishow Awards Academy announced several changes and introduction of new categories. The Academy has expanded to more than 900 members, composed by members of the music industry, with diversity in gender, race, color, musical genres, and region. Additionally, new categories were introduced to recognize artists and musical genres. One of these categories is Pop of the Year, to recognize pop music genre. The award was first presented to Iza and MC Carol for the song "Fé nas Maluca".

== Recipients ==
=== 2020s ===
Recipients
Year	Winner(s)	Nominees	Ref.
2023	Iza and MC Carol – "Fé nas Maluca"	Pabllo Vittar and Gloria Groove – "Ameianoite"; Jão – "Me Lambe"; Jão and Anitta – "Pilantra"; Ludmilla – "Sintomas de Prazer"; Marina Sena – "Tudo Pra Amar Você"	
2024	Pabllo Vittar – "São Amores"	Liniker, Lulu Santos and Pabllo Vittar – "Deixa Estar"; Jão and Gustavo Mioto – "Mal"; Jão – "O Triste É Que Eu Te Amo"; Pedro Sampaio – "PocPoc"; Luísa Sonza (featuring Kayblack) – "Sagrado Profano"	
2025	Marina Sena – "Numa Ilha"	Iza – "Caos and Sal"; Melly – "Despacha"; Lexa and MC Kevin o Chris – "É Arte"; Marina Sena – "Lua Cheia"; Duda Beat and Ajuliacosta – "Você Vai Gostar"	

== Artists with multiple nominations ==
4 nominations

- Jão

3 nominations

- Pabllo Vittar
