= Multishow Brazilian Music Award for DJ of the Year =

Brazilian music for DJs

- Awarded for: Disc jockeys (DJs)
- Country: Brazil
- Presented by: Multishow
- First award: 2023
- Most recent winner: Papatinho (2025)

Highlights
- Most awards: Alok (2)
- Most nominations: Alok, Mu540 and Pedro Sampaio (2 each)
- Website: Official website

The Multishow Brazilian Music Award for DJ of the Year is an award presented at the Multishow Brazilian Music Awards, to disc jockeys (DJs). The category was first presented in 2023. The inaugural winner Alok won the award twice, the most for any artist. Alok, Mu540 and Pedro Sampaio holds the record for most nominations, with two each.

== History ==
For the 2023 ceremony, the Multishow Awards Academy announced several changes and introduction of new categories. The Academy has expanded to more than 900 members, composed by members of the music industry, with diversity in gender, race, color, musical genres, and region. Additionally, new categories were introduced to recognize artists and musical genres. One of these categories is DJ of the Year, to recognize disc jockeys.

== Recipients ==
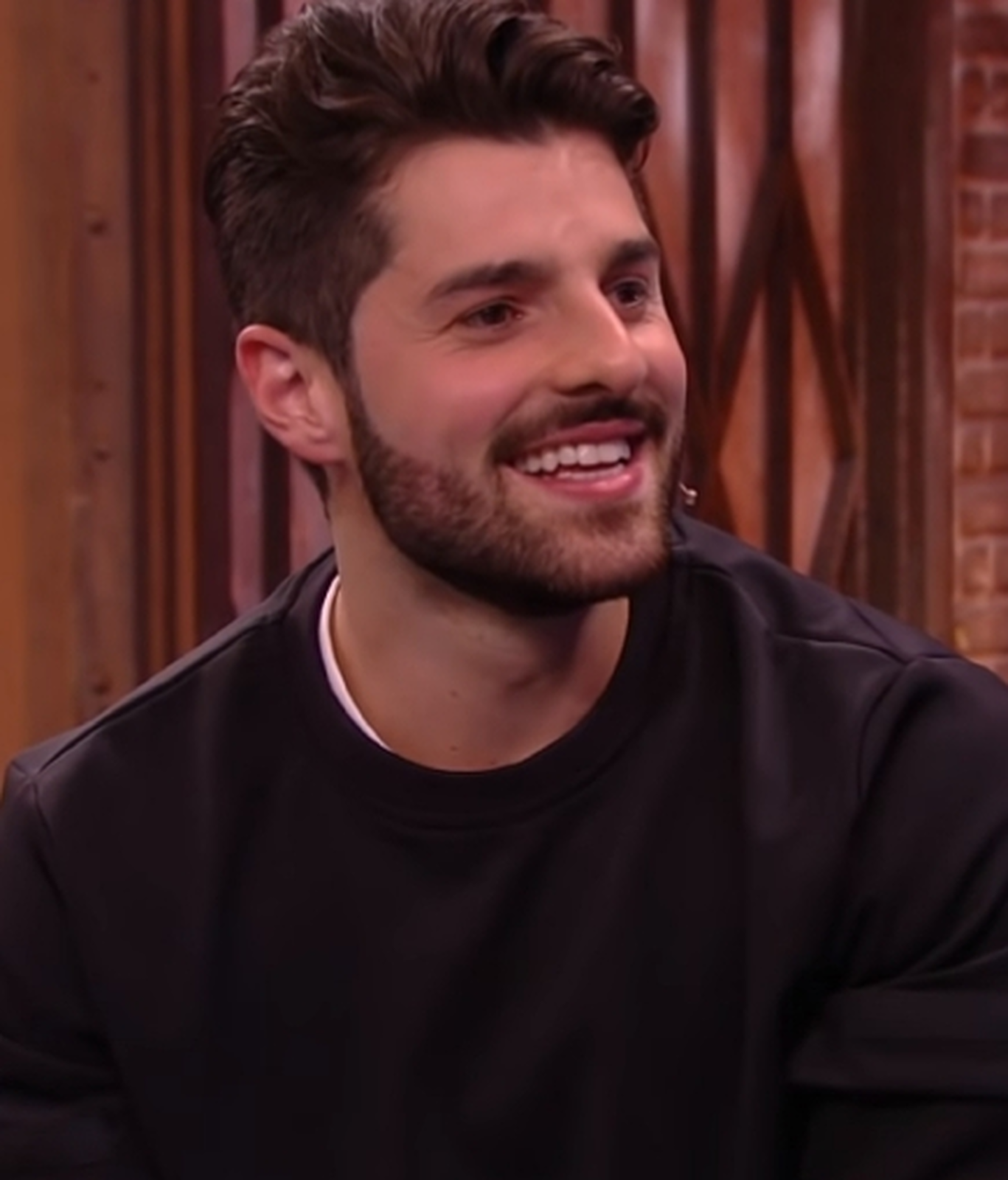
The inaugural winner, Alok, won the award two consecutive times

=== 2020s ===
Recipients
Year	Winner(s)	Nominees	Ref.
2023	Alok	Dennis; Mu540; Pedro Sampaio; Vhoor; Vintage Culture	
2024	Alok	Anna; Mochakk; Mu540; Paulete Lindacelva; Pedro Sampaio	
2025	Papatinho	Alok; Dennis; Mochakk; Pedro Sampaio; Vintage Culture	

== Artists with multiple wins ==
2 wins

- Alok

== Artists with multiple nominations ==
2 nominations

- Alok
- Mu540
- Pedro Sampaio
