= Multishow Brazilian Music Award for Samba/Pagode of the Year =

Brazilian music award for samba and pagode songs

- Awarded for: Samba and pagode songs
- Country: Brazil
- Presented by: Multishow
- First award: 2023
- Currently held by: "P do Pecado" – Menos é Mais and Simone Mendes (2025)

Highlights
- Most nominations: Ferrugem (4)
- Website: Official website

The Multishow Brazilian Music Award for Samba/Pagode of the Year is an award presented at the Multishow Brazilian Music Awards, to artists for samba and pagode songs. The award was first presented to Xande de Pilares for the song "Muito Romântico" in 2023. Ferrugem holds the record for most nominations, with four.

== History ==
For the 2023 ceremony, the Multishow Awards Academy announced several changes and introduction of new categories. The Academy has expanded to more than 900 members, composed by members of the music industry, with diversity in gender, race, color, musical genres, and region. Additionally, new categories were introduced to recognize artists and musical genres. One of these categories is Samba/Pagode of the Year, to recognize samba and pagode genres.

== Recipients ==
=== 2020s ===
Recipients
Year	Winner(s)	Nominees	Ref.
2023	Xande de Pilares – "Muito Romântico"	Dilsinho – "Diferentão (Ao Vivo)"; Ludmilla and Marília Mendonça – "Insônia"; Ferrugem – "Interessante"; Menos é Mais and Matheus Fernandes – "Lapada Dela (Ao Vivo)"; Ferrugem and Iza – "Me Perdoa"	
2024	Gloria Groove – "Nosso Primeiro Beijo"	Ferrugem and Sorriso Maroto – "Apaguei pra Todos"; Menos é Mais – "Coração Partido"; Liniker and Thiaguinho – "Febre"; Ludmilla – "Maliciosa"; Ferrugem – "Me Bloqueia"	
2025	Menos é Mais and Simone Mendes – "P do Pecado"	Ferrugem – "Apagar (Fundo Raso)"; Turma do Pagode, Ferrugem and Mumuzinho – "Duvido"; Yan and Sorriso Maroto – "Fica com Deus"; Menos é Mais and Nattan – "Pela Última Vez"; Xande de Pilares – "Vento"	

== Artists with multiple nominations ==
4 nominations

- Ferrugem

2 nominations

- Ludmilla
- Menos é Mais
