= Multishow Brazilian Music Award for Sertanejo of the Year =

Brazilian music award for sertanejo songs

- Awarded for: Sertanejo songs
- Country: Brazil
- Presented by: Multishow
- First award: 2023
- Most recent winner: "Tubarões" – Diego & Victor Hugo (2025)

Highlights
- Most nominations: Jorge & Mateus and Simone Mendes (3 each)
- Website: Official website

The Multishow Brazilian Music Award for Sertanejo of the Year is an award presented at the Multishow Brazilian Music Awards, to artists for sertanejo songs. The award was first presented to Simone Mendes for the song "Erro Gostoso (Ao Vivo)" in 2023. Jorge & Mateus and Simone Mendes holds the record for most nominations, with three each.

== History ==
For the 2023 ceremony, the Multishow Awards Academy announced several changes and introduction of new categories. The Academy has expanded to more than 900 members, composed by members of the music industry, with diversity in gender, race, color, musical genres, and region. Additionally, new categories were introduced to recognize artists and musical genres. One of these categories is Sertanejo of the Year, to recognize sertanejo music genre. The award was first presented to Simone Mendes for the song "Erro Gostoso (Ao Vivo)".

== Recipients ==
=== 2020s ===
Recipients
Year	Winner(s)	Nominees	Ref.
2023	Simone Mendes – "Erro Gostoso (Ao Vivo)"	Jorge & Mateus – "Dói"; Maiara & Maraisa – "Narcisista (Ao Vivo)"; Ana Castela – "Nosso Quadro"; Zé Neto & Cristiano – "Oi Balde (Ao Vivo)"; Ana Castela – "Solteiro Forçado (Boiadeira Internacional)"	
2024	Lauana Prado – "Escrito nas Estrelas"	Simone Mendes – "Dois Tristes"; Felipe & Rodrigo – "Gosta de Rua"; Jorge & Mateus and Lauana Prado – "Haverá Sinais"; Simone Mendes – "Mulher Foda"; Jorge & Mateus and Henrique & Juliano – "Xonei"	
2025	Diego & Victor Hugo – "Tubarões"	Matheus & Kauan and Ana Castela – "Ilusão de Ótica"; Ana Castela – "Olha Onde Eu Tô"; Lauana Prado and Simone Mendes – "Saudade Burra"; Simone Mendes – "Saudade Proibida"; Zé Felipe and Ana Castela – "Sua Boca Mente (You're Still the One)"	

== Artists with multiple nominations ==
3 nominations

- Jorge & Mateus
- Simone Mendes

2 nominations

- Ana Castela
- Lauana Prado
