= Multishow Brazilian Music Award for MPB of the Year =

Brazilian music award for música popular brasileira (MPB) songs

- Awarded for: Música popular brasileira (MPB) songs
- Country: Brazil
- Presented by: Multishow
- First award: 2023
- Most recent winner: "Apocalipse" – Luedji Luna, Seu Jorge, Arthur Verocai and Fejuca (2025)

Highlights
- Most nominations: Gilsons and Liniker (3 each)
- Website: Official website

The Multishow Brazilian Music Award for MPB of the Year is an award presented at the Multishow Brazilian Music Awards, to artists for música popular brasileira (MPB) songs. The award was first presented to Elza Soares for the song "No Tempo da Intolerância" in 2023. Gilsons and Liniker holds the record for most nominations, with three each.

== History ==
For the 2023 ceremony, the Multishow Awards Academy announced several changes and introduction of new categories. The Academy has expanded to more than 900 members, composed by members of the music industry, with diversity in gender, race, color, musical genres, and region. Additionally, new categories were introduced to recognize artists and musical genres. One of these categories is MPB of the Year, to recognize música popular brasileira (MPB) genre. The award was first presented to Elza Soares for the song "No Tempo da Intolerância".

== Recipients ==
=== 2020s ===
Recipients
Year	Winner(s)	Nominees	Ref.
2023	Elza Soares – "No Tempo da Intolerância"	Gilsons, Rachel Reis and Mulu – "Bateu"; Gilsons and Lagum – "Céu Rosé"; Luísa Sonza – "Chico"; Rubel and Xande de Pilares – "Grão de Areia"; Vanessa da Mata – "Vem Doce"	
2024	Liniker – "Caju"	Melly – "Cacau"; Jota.pê and Gilsons – "Feito a Maré"; Jota.pê – "Ouro Marrom"; Liniker – "Tudo"; Liniker – "Veludo Marrom"	
2025	Luedji Luna, Seu Jorge, Arthur Verocai and Fejuca – "Apocalipse"	Jota.pê – "Açaí"; Caetano Veloso and Maria Bethânia – "Fé (Ao vivo)"; Zé Ibarra – "Infinito em Nós"; Marisa Monte – "Sua Onda"; Djavan – "Um Brinde"	

== Artists with multiple nominations ==
3 nominations

- Gilsons
- Liniker

2 nominations

- Jota.pê
