= Multishow Brazilian Music Award for Axé/Pagodão of the Year =

Brazilian music award for axé and pagode baiano songs

- Awarded for: Axé and pagode baiano songs
- Country: Brazil
- Presented by: Multishow
- First award: 2023
- Most recent winner: "O Baiano Tem o Molho" – O Kannalha (2025)

Highlights
- Most nominations: Àttooxxá, Ivete Sangalo and Leo Santana (3 each)
- Website: Official website

The Multishow Brazilian Music Award for Axé/Pagodão of the Year is an award presented at the Multishow Brazilian Music Awards, to artists for axé and pagode baiano songs. The award was first presented to Leo Santana for the song "Zona de Perigo" in 2023. Àttooxxá, Ivete Sangalo and Leo Santana holds the record for most nominations, with three each.

== History ==
For the 2023 ceremony, the Multishow Awards Academy announced several changes and introduction of new categories. The Academy has expanded to more than 900 members, composed by members of the music industry, with diversity in gender, race, color, musical genres, and region. Additionally, new categories were introduced to recognize artists and musical genres. One of these categories is Axé/Pagodão of the Year, to recognize axé and pagode baiano genres. The award was first presented to Leo Santana for the song "Zona de Perigo".

== Recipients ==
=== 2020s ===
Recipients
Year	Winner(s)	Nominees	Ref.
2023	Leo Santana – "Zona de Perigo"	Ivete Sangalo – "Cria da Ivete (Ao Vivo)"; Àttooxxá (featuring Liniker) – "Dejavú"; Oh Polêmico – "Pitbull Enraivado"; Leo Santana – "Posturado e Calmo"; A Dama – "Soca Fofo"	
2024	Ivete Sangalo and Ludmilla – "Macetando"	O Kannalha – "Nego Doce"; Parangolé (featuring Leo Santana) – "Perna Bamba"; Ivete Sangalo and Liniker – "Seus Recados"; Àttøøxxá and É o Tchan! – "Tá Gostosin"; Àttøøxxá (featuring Baco Exu do Blues) – "Tranca Rua"	
2025	O Kannalha – "O Baiano Tem o Molho"	Leo Santana and Melody – "Desliza (Ólhinho no Corpinho)"; Ivete Sangalo – "Energia de Gostosa"; Tília, Kadu Martins, MC Daniel, Leo Santana and DG e Batidão Stronda – "Hoje Eu Vou Te Usar"; Ivete Sangalo – "O Verão Bateu em Minha Porta"; Leo Santana – "Surra de Toma"	

== Artists with multiple nominations ==
3 nominations

- Àttooxxá
- Ivete Sangalo
- Leo Santana

2 nominations

- Liniker
