= Multishow Brazilian Music Award for Cover Art of the Year =

Brazilian music industry award

Multishow Brazilian Music Award for Cover of the Year
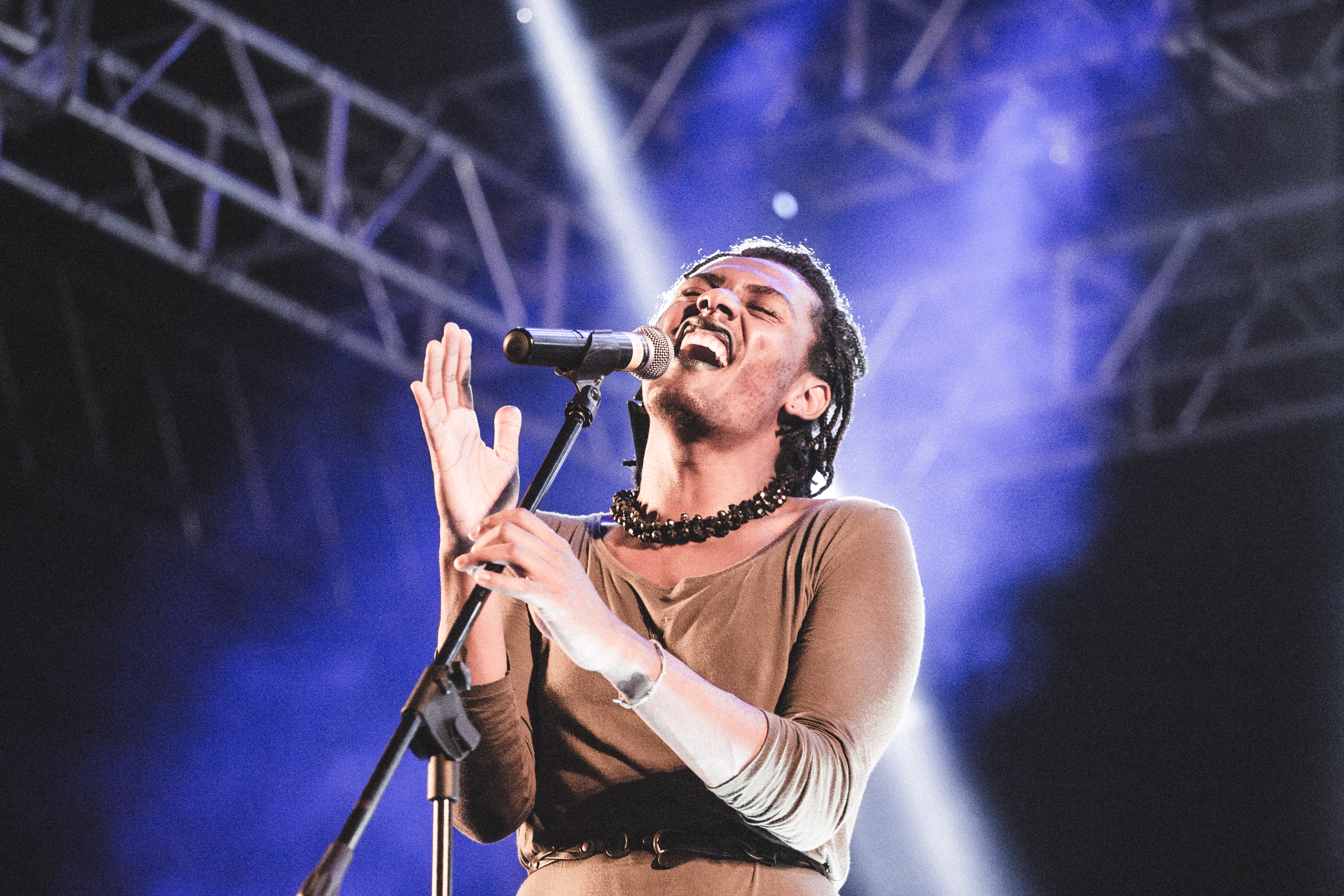
- Liniker is the most recent recipient
- Awarded for: Liniker – Caju is the most recent recipient
- Country: Brazil
- Presented by: Multishow
- First award: 2016
- Currently held by: Liniker – Caju (2024)

Highlights
- Most awards: Iza (2)
- Most nominations: Anitta; Iza; Gloria Groove (2 each)
- Website: Official website

The Multishow Brazilian Music Award for Cover of the Year is an annual award given at the Multishow Brazilian Music Award, a ceremony established in 1994 and originally called the TVZ Awards. The category was introduced in 2016 under the name Best Record Cover. In 2021, the category's name was changed to Cover of the Year, aiming to recognize and honor the best album covers released throughout the year.

== History ==
In its debut, the category was judged by the Superjury, a select group of experts from the music industry. However, starting in 2022, the responsibility for selecting the winner was passed to members of the Multishow Award Academy, made up of professionals from the music world. This group is responsible for evaluating and voting on the album covers, considering aspects such as originality, creativity, and visual impact.

== Recipients ==
Year	Winner(s)	Nominees	Ref.
2016	Mahmundi – Mahmundi	Tropix – Céu; MM3 – Metá Metá	
2017	Galanga Livre - Rincon Sapiência	Caravanas - Chico Buarque; Letrux Em Noite de Climão - Letrux	
2021	De Primeira – Marina Sena	—N/a	
2022	Fé – Iza	Fúria – Urias; Lady Leste – Gloria Groove; Lume – Filipe Ret; Portas – Marisa Monte; QVVJFA? – Baco Exu do Blues; Urucum – Karol Conká; Versions of Me – Anitta	
2023	Afrodhit – Iza	Escândalo Íntimo – Luísa Sonza; Icarus – BK'; O Dono do Lugar – Djonga; Super – Jão; Vício Inerente – Marina Sena	
2024	Caju – Liniker	Funk Generation – Anitta; Oproprio – Yago Oproprio; Serenata da GG, Vol. 1 – Gloria Groove; Tara e Tal – Duda Beat; Topo da Minha Cabeça – Tássia Reis	
