= Multishow Brazilian Music Award for Funk of the Year =

Brazilian music award for funk carioca songs

- Awarded for: Funk carioca songs
- Country: Brazil
- Presented by: Multishow
- First award: 2023
- Most recent winner: "Bota um Funk" – Pedro Sampaio, Anitta and MC GW (2025)

Highlights
- Most awards: Dennis (2)
- Most nominations: MC Rodrigo do CN (4)
- Website: Official website

The Multishow Brazilian Music Award for Funk of the Year is an award presented at the Multishow Brazilian Music Awards, to artists for funk carioca songs. The award was first presented to Dennis and Kevin o Chris for the song "Tá OK" in 2023. Dennis is the most awarded artist in the category with two wins. MC Rodrigo do CN holds the record for most nominations, with four.

== History ==
For the 2023 ceremony, the Multishow Awards Academy announced several changes and introduction of new categories. The Academy has expanded to more than 900 members, composed by members of the music industry, with diversity in gender, race, color, musical genres, and region. Additionally, new categories were introduced to recognize artists and musical genres. One of these categories is Funk of the Year, to recognize funk carioca genre. The award was first presented to Dennis and Kevin o Chris for the song "Tá OK".

== Recipients ==
=== 2020s ===
Recipients
Year	Winner(s)	Nominees	Ref.
2023	Dennis and Kevin o Chris – "Tá OK"	Kevin o Chris – "Faz um Vuk Vuk (Teto Espelhado)"; Anitta – "Funk Rave"; MC Ryan SP, MC Daniel and Kotim – "Namora Aí"; MC Livinho and DJ Matt D – "Novidade na Área"; DJ Dyamante – "Vai Novinha Ah, Ah, Ah"	
2024	Anitta, Dennis and Pedro Sampaio – "Joga pra Lua"	DJ Topo, MC Leozin, Seu Jorge and MC G15 – "MTG Quem Não Quer Sou Eu"; Kevin o Chris and Luísa Sonza – "Recadin No Espelho"; Oruam, Didi, DJ LC da Roça, MC K9, MC Smith and Mainstreet – "Rolé na Favela de Nave"; DJ Zigão, DJ Lafon do Md, MC Rodrigo do CN and MC Rf – "Te Maceto Depois do Baile"; The Box, MC Brinquedo, MC Cebezinho, MC Laranjinha, MC Tuto and DJ Oreia – "The Box Medley Funk 2"	
2025	Pedro Sampaio, Anitta and MC GW – "Bota um Funk"	MC Rodrigo do CN, MC Meno K and DJ Caio Vieira – "Famosinha"; Dennis and Luísa Sonza – "Motinha 2.0 (Mete Marcha)"; Oruam, Zé Felipe, MC Tuto, MC Rodrigo do CN, DJ Lc da Roça, MC K9 and MC PL Alves – "Oh Garota Eu Quero Você Só pra Mim"; Pedro Sampaio, MC GW, MC Rodrigo do CN, MC Jhey and MC Nito – "Sequência Feiticeira"; MC Dricka and DJ S2k – "Vou Raspar Seu Bigodin"	

== Artists with multiple nominations ==
4 nominations

- MC Rodrigo do CN

3 nominations

- Anitta
- Dennis
- Kevin o Chris
- Pedro Sampaio

2 nominations

- Luísa Sonza
- MC GW
- MC K9
- MC Tuto
- Oruam
