= Multishow Brazilian Music Award for Urban Song of the Year =

Brazilian music industry award

- Awarded for: Urbano music songs
- Country: Brazil
- Presented by: Multishow
- First award: 2024
- Most recent winner: "Cacos de Vidro (sample: Esperar pra Ver)" – BK', Kolo and Evinha (2025)
- Website: Official website

The Multishow Brazilian Music Award for Urban Song of the Year is an award presented at the Multishow Brazilian Music Awards, to artists for urbano music songs. The award was first presented to MC Hariel and Gilberto Gil for the song "A Dança" in 2024.

== Recipients ==
=== 2020s ===
Recipients
Year	Winner(s)	Nominees	Ref.
2024	MC Hariel and Gilberto Gil – "A Dança"	MC Cabelinho – "Carta Aberta"; Matuê – "Crack com Mussilon"; Yago Oproprio – "La Noche"; Duquesa, Yunk Vino and Go Dassisti – "Purple Rain"; Ajuliacosta – "Você Parece com Vergonha"	
2025	BK', Kolo and Evinha – "Cacos de Vidro (sample: Esperar pra Ver)"	Tasha & Tracie – "Amina"; Ajuliacosta, KL Jay and Maffalda – "Dharma"; Duquesa and Go Dassisti – "Fuso"; Ryu, the Runner, Vulgo FK, Neckklace and 6ee – "Lido com Crises"; Veigh – "Talvez Você Precise de Mim"	

== See also ==
- Multishow Brazilian Music Award for Hip Hop of the Year
