= Multishow Brazilian Music Award for Music Production of the Year =

Brazilian music industry award

- Country: Brazil
- Presented by: Multishow
- First award: 2017
- Currently held by: Pretinho da Serrinha (2023)

Highlights
- Most nominations: Pretinho da Serrinha; Eduardo Pepato; Papatinho (2 each)
- Website: Official website

Multishow Brazilian Music Award for Music Production of the Year is an annual award presented at the Multishow Brazilian Music Award, first introduced in the 2017 edition under the name Best Producer. The category was later renamed to Producer of the Year in 2021. In 2022, the award name was changed to its current title.

== Recipients ==
Year	Winner(s)	Nominees	Ref.
2017	Galanga Livre - Rincon Sapiência	Caravanas - Chico Buarque; Letrux Em Noite de Climão - Letrux	
2021	Kiko Dinucci	—N/a	
2022	Papatinho	Eduardo Pepato; Pablo Bispo; Prateado; Pupillo; Rafinha RSQ; Ruxell no Beat; Vhoor	
2023	Pretinho da Serrinha	Douglas Moda; Iuri Rio Branco; Mu540; Nave; Papatinho	
2024	—N/a	Eduardo Pepato; Gustavo Ruiz Chagas; Julio Fejuca; Pretinho da Serrinha; Rafael Castilhol; Iuri Rio Branco	
