= Multishow Brazilian Music Award for Rock of the Year =

Brazilian music award for rock songs

- Awarded for: Rock songs
- Country: Brazil
- Presented by: Multishow
- First award: 2023
- Currently held by: "Dig Dig RMX/Duas Cidades" – Planet Hemp and BaianaSystem (2025)

Highlights
- Most nominations: Black Pantera, Dead Fish and Planet Hemp (2 each)
- Website: Official website

The Multishow Brazilian Music Award for Rock of the Year is an award presented at the Multishow Brazilian Music Awards, to artists for rock songs. The award was first presented to Planet Hemp and Criolo for the song "Distopia" in 2023. Black Pantera, Dead Fish and Planet Hemp holds the record for most nominations, with two each.

== History ==
For the 2023 ceremony, the Multishow Awards Academy announced several changes and introduction of new categories. The Academy has expanded to more than 900 members, composed by members of the music industry, with diversity in gender, race, color, musical genres, and region. Additionally, new categories were introduced to recognize artists and musical genres. One of these categories is Rock of the Year, to recognize rock genre.

== Recipients ==
=== 2020s ===
Recipients
Year	Winner(s)	Nominees	Ref.
2023	Planet Hemp and Criolo – "Distopia"	Supercombo – "Aos Poucos"; Ana Frango Elétrico – "Electric Fish"; Sophia Chablau e Uma Enorme Perda de Tempo – "Segredo"; Planet Hemp – "Taca Fogo"; NX Zero – "Você Vai Lembrar de Mim"	
2024	Barão Vermelho and Cazuza – "Do Tamanho da Vida"	Dead Fish – "Dentes Amarelos"; Fresno – "Eu Nunca Fui Embora"; Dead Fish – "Labirinto da Memória"; Black Pantera – "Perpétuo"; Black Pantera – "Tradução"	
2025	Planet Hemp and BaianaSystem – "Dig Dig RMX/Duas Cidades"	Lagum – "A Cidade"; Di Ferrero – "Além do Fim"; Terno Rei – "Nada Igual"; Planet Hemp, Seu Jorge and Emicida – "Nunca Tenha Medo RMX"; Duquesa and Iorigun – "Toda Garota Como Eu"	

== Artists with multiple nominations ==
2 nominations

- Black Pantera
- Dead Fish
- Planet Hemp
