= Multishow Brazilian Music Award for Brazil Category =

Brazilian music industry award

- Country: Brazil
- Presented by: Multishow
- First award: 2023
- Most recent winner: Benzadeus from Central-West (2025)
- Website: Official website

The Multishow Brazilian Music Award for Brazil Category is an award presented at the Multishow Brazilian Music Awards. In its first year, in 2023, the category recognized the most prominent song among the 27 from each Brazilian state. The award was first presented to Santa Catarina artist Isa Buzzi for the song "Direitos Autorais". In 2024, the nominees were based on the artists, instead of songs.

== History ==
For the 2023 ceremony, the Multishow Awards Academy announced several changes and introduction of new categories. The Academy has expanded to more than 900 members, composed by members of the music industry, with diversity in gender, race, color, musical genres, and region. Additionally, new categories were introduced to recognize artists and musical genres. One of these categories is Brazil Category. In the first year of the category, the Academy selected the songs that stood out in each Brazilian state. From this selection, the 27 most mentioned songs — one from each state — were chosen, and fans trough voting determined the five finalists. The award was first presented to Isa Buzzi, from Santa Catarina in the South region, for the song "Direitos Autorais". In 2024, the nominees were based on the artists, instead of songs.

== Recipients ==
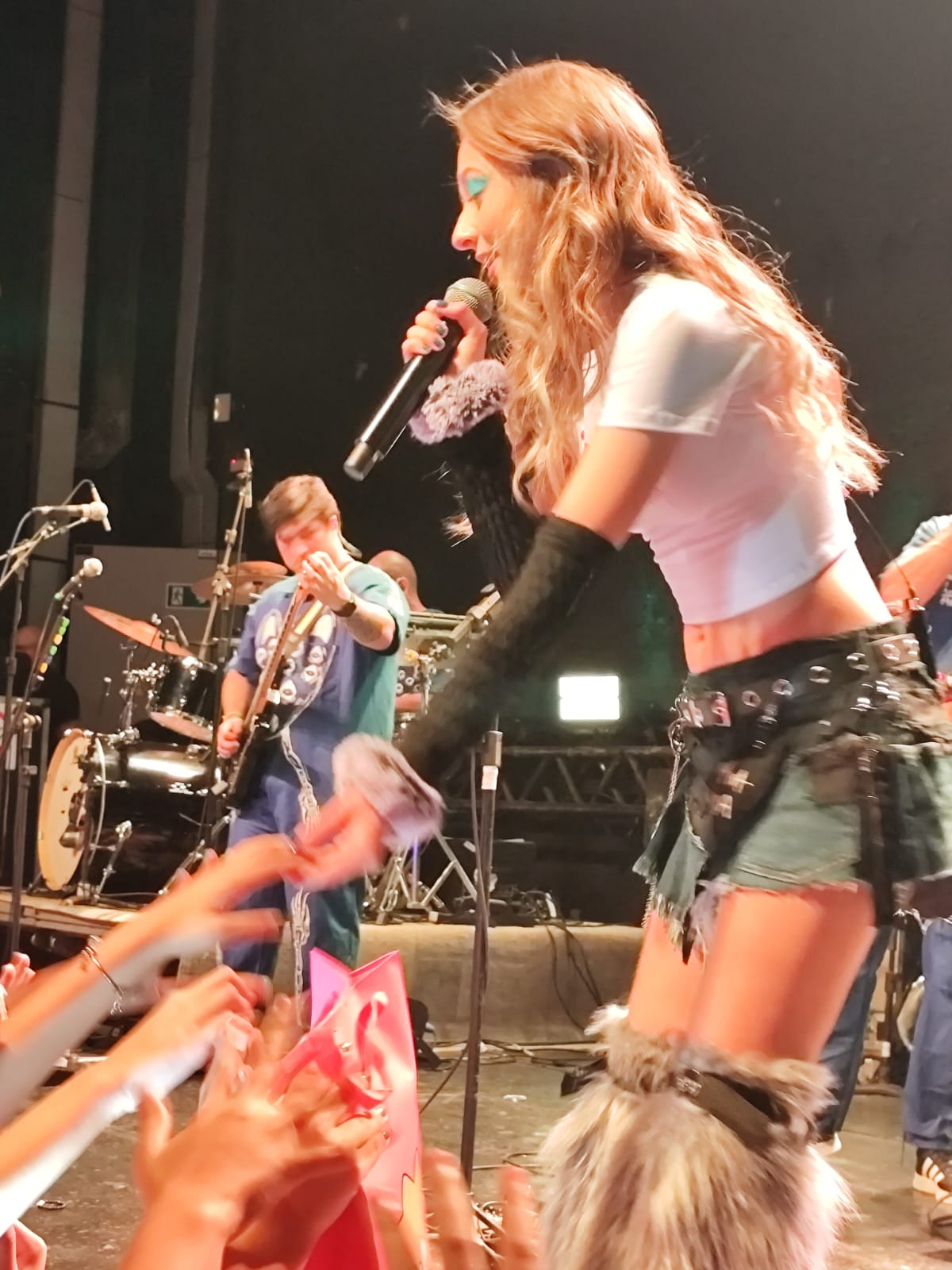
Inaugural winner Isa Buzzi

=== 2020s ===
Recipients
| Year | Winner(s) | Shortlist | Nominees | Ref. |
|---|---|---|---|---|
| 2023 | South, Santa Catarina: Isa Buzzi – "Direitos Autorais" | Central-West, Federal District: Banda Rock Beats – "Eu Só Quero Ficar Só"; Northeast, Pernambuco: Joyce Alane (featuring João Gomes) – "Idiota Raiz"; North, Tocantins: Pedro Libe (featuring Hugo & Guilherme) – "O Copo Não Mente"; Southeast, Rio de Janeiro: Os Garotin – "Zero a Cem" | Central-West: Goiás: Kamisa 10 – "Lance Livre"; Mato Grosso: Karola Nunes – "Botânica"; Mato Grosso do Sul: SoulRa (featuring Theo TWK) – "Trapnojo"; Northeast: Alagoas: Bruno Berle – "Quero Dizer"; Bahia: Josyara (featuring Juliana Linhares) – "Não Tem Lua"; Ceará: Mateus Fazeno Rock (featuring Mumutante) – "Pode Ser Easy"; Maranhão: Luna Falcão – "Silêncio"; Paraíba: Bixarte (featuring Urias) – "Pitbull Sem Coleira"; Piauí: Getúlio Abelha – "Voguebike"; Rio Grande do Norte: Tanda Macêdo – "Nossa Rotina"; Sergipe: Tori (featuring Bruno Berle) – "Descesse"; North: Acre: Brunno Damasceno – "Consciência de Classe"; Amapá: Ariel Moura – "Língua Intrusa"; Amazonas: Karen Francis – "Cardume"; Pará: Luê – "Preamar"; Rondônia: Gabriê – "Magia Leonina"; Roraima: Marília Tavares – "Me Dói Imaginar"; Southeast: Espírito Santo: Dudu (featuring MC Menor e Kailê) – "Mensagem"; Minas Gerais: Rayane & Rafaela (featuring Henrique & Juliano) – "Ali Te Ama"; São Paulo: Kaique & Felipe (featuring Luan Santana) – "Minha Pessoa"; South: Paraná: Vicka – "Romântica Demais"; Rio Grande do Sul: Cristal – "Kawo" | |
| 2024 | North: Viviane Batidão | Northeast: Sued Nunes; Central-West: Thauane; South: Vitor Limma; Southeast: Yan | —N/a | |
| 2025 | Central-West: Benzadeus | Southeast: Bruna Black; South: Zudizilla; Northeast: Josyara; North: Marília Tavares | —N/a | |
