= Joyce Alane =

Brazilian singer-songwriter (born 1998)

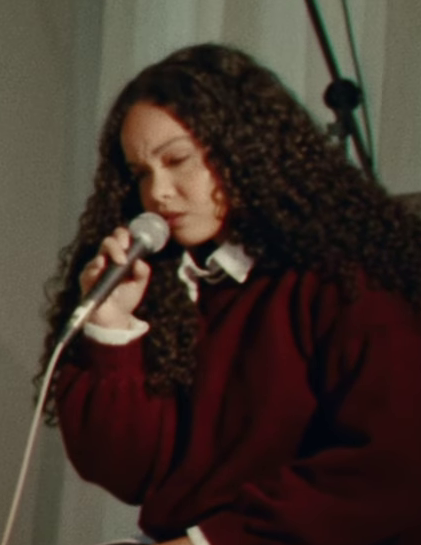
- Alane in 2025
- Born: Joyce Alane da Silva Ferreira; 1 February 1998 (age 28); Recife, Pernambuco, Brazil
- Occupation: Singer
- Years active: 2017–present
- Musical career
- Genres: MPB

Joyce Alane da Silva Ferreira (born 1 February 1998) is a Brazilian singer-songwriter.

== Life and career ==
Born in Recife, Alane is the daughter of a Portuguese teacher and single mother. At the age of 12, she began studying piano at the Pernambuco Conservatory of Music. In her adolescence, she set music aside, and studied Architecture and Urbanism at the university. In 2017, she co-founded with Afonso Santti, a university friend, the duo Luamarte, performing at weddings and small events.

Her solo career was shaped and propelled by her presence on social media, where she first gained recognition through a cover of Kitara's song "Dizem Que Sou Louca". During the COVID-19 lockdown in 2020, she started posting singing videos online and created the project "Me dá uma luz" ('Give Me a Light'), where fans contributed words that she turned into songs; some of the videos went viral, reaching nine million views. She made her official recording debut with the single "Leão", which was the first song she wrote entirely on her own.

In 2023, Alane was nominated at the 30th Multishow Brazilian Music Awards in the Brazil category for her song "Idiota Raiz" featuring João Gomes. In 2024, she released her debut album, Tudo é minha culpa. In 2025, she released the album Casa Coração, featuring guest appearances by Mariana Aydar, Zeca Baleiro and Chico César, among others. For the album, she was nominated at the 26th Annual Latin Grammy Awards in the Best Portuguese Language Roots Album category. The same year, she got a nomination as Best New Artist at the Brazilian Music Awards.

== Discography ==
Albums

- Tudo é minha culpa (2024)
- Casa Coração (2025)
