= Rachel Reis =

Brazilian singer-songwriter (born 1997)

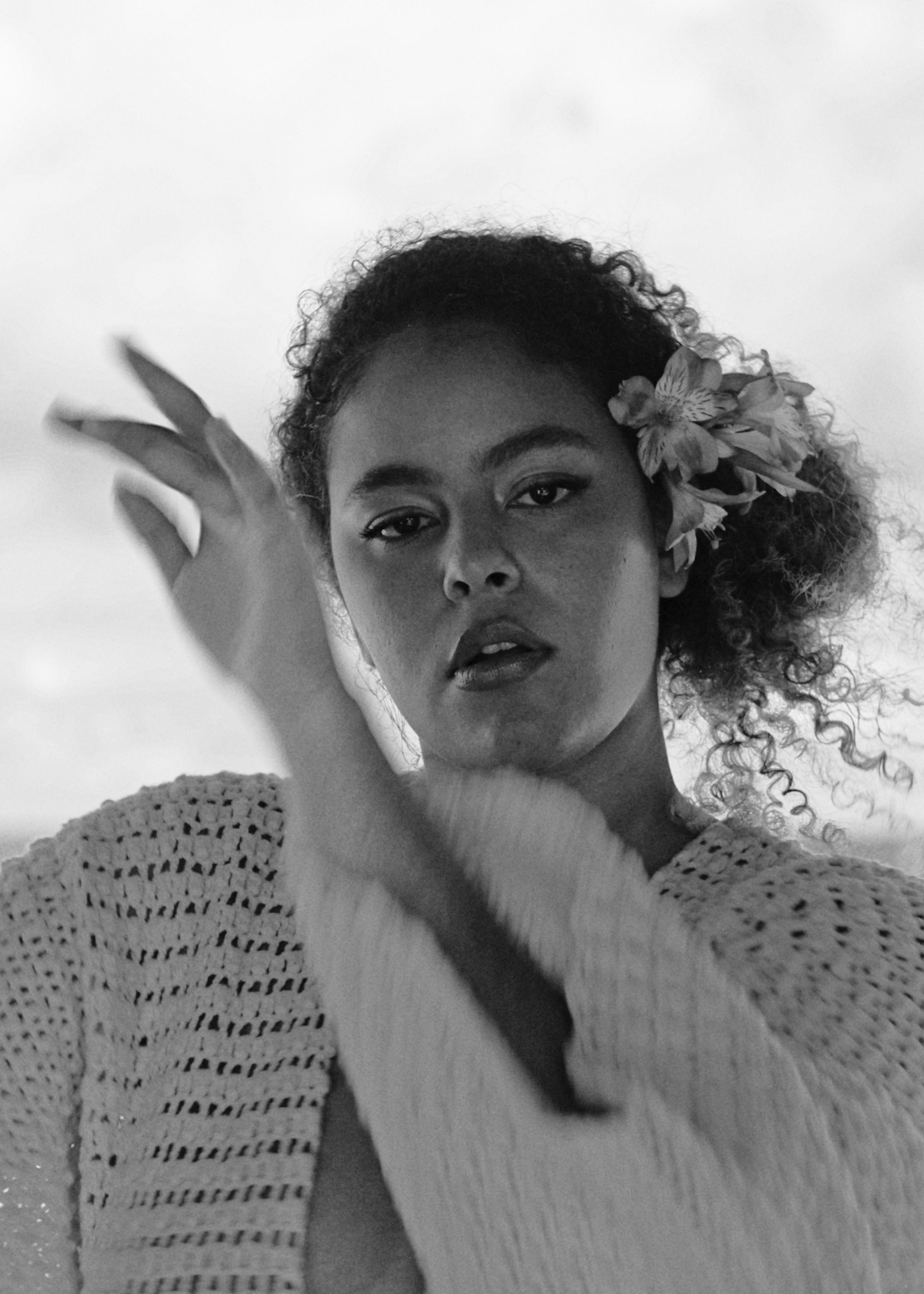
- Reis in 2025
- Born: Rachel Reis de Cerqueira; 4 February 1997 (age 29); Feira de Santana, Bahia, Brazil
- Occupation: singer
- Years active: 2020–present
- Musical career
- Genres: MPB, pop, electronic, axé, arrocha, reggae, Afrobeat

Rachel Reis de Cerqueira (born 4 February 1997) is a Brazilian singer-songwriter.

== Life and career ==
Born in Feira de Santana, Reis is the daughter of radio broadcaster Henrique Cerqueira and forró singer Maura Reis. She started singing in 2016, performing in the bars of her region. In 2018, she temporarily left music to study law and advertising. In 2020, she made her recording debut with the single "Ventilador".

In 2021, Reis had her breakout with the single "Maresia" and the EP Encosta. In 2022, she released her first album, Meu Esquem, which was nominated at the 24th Annual Latin Grammy Awards for Best Portuguese Language Rock or Alternative Album. The same year, she was nominated at the 29th Multishow Brazilian Music Awards for New Artist, and at the WME Award in the same category. In 2023, she was nominated at the 30th Multishow Brazilian Music Awards with the song "Bateu" in the MPB of the Year category.

In 2025, Reis released her second album, Divina Casca, for which she received a Latin Grammy Award nomination for Best MPB Album. She collaborated with artists such as BaianaSystem, Don L, Rincon Sapiência, Psirico, and Nêssa.

== Discography ==
Albums

- Encosta (EP, 2021)
- Meu Esquem (2022)
- Divina Casca (2025)
