= Grelo (singer) =

Brazilian singer-songwriter (born 1997)

- Born: Gabriel Ângelo Furtado de Oliveira; 14 September 1997 (age 28); Anápolis, Goiás, Brazil
- Occupation: singer
- Musical career
- Genres: MPB

Gabriel Ângelo Furtado de Oliveira (born 14 September 1997), known professionally as Grelo and De Ângelo, is a Brazilian singer-songwriter.

== Life and career ==
Born in Anápolis, Grelo started his artistic career writing songs for artists such as Gusttavo Lima, Luan Santana, Marília Mendonça, Wesley Safadão, Maiara & Maraisa, Jorge & Mateus, Simone Mendes, Lauana Prado and Matheus & Kauan. Encouraged by the duo Henrique & Juliano, he launched his singing career in 2024, gaining a major hit with "Só fé", which topped the Billboard and Spotify charts. The same year, he released his debut album, É o Grelo, and won the Multishow Brazilian Music Award for Arrocha of the Year.

In 2025, Grelo won the Brazilian Music Award for Revelation Artist. The same year, he got a nomination at the Troféu Imprensa in the Revelation category.

== Discography ==
Albums

- É o Grelo (2024)
