= Gabriela Rocha (singer) =

Brazilian singer-songwriter (born 1994)

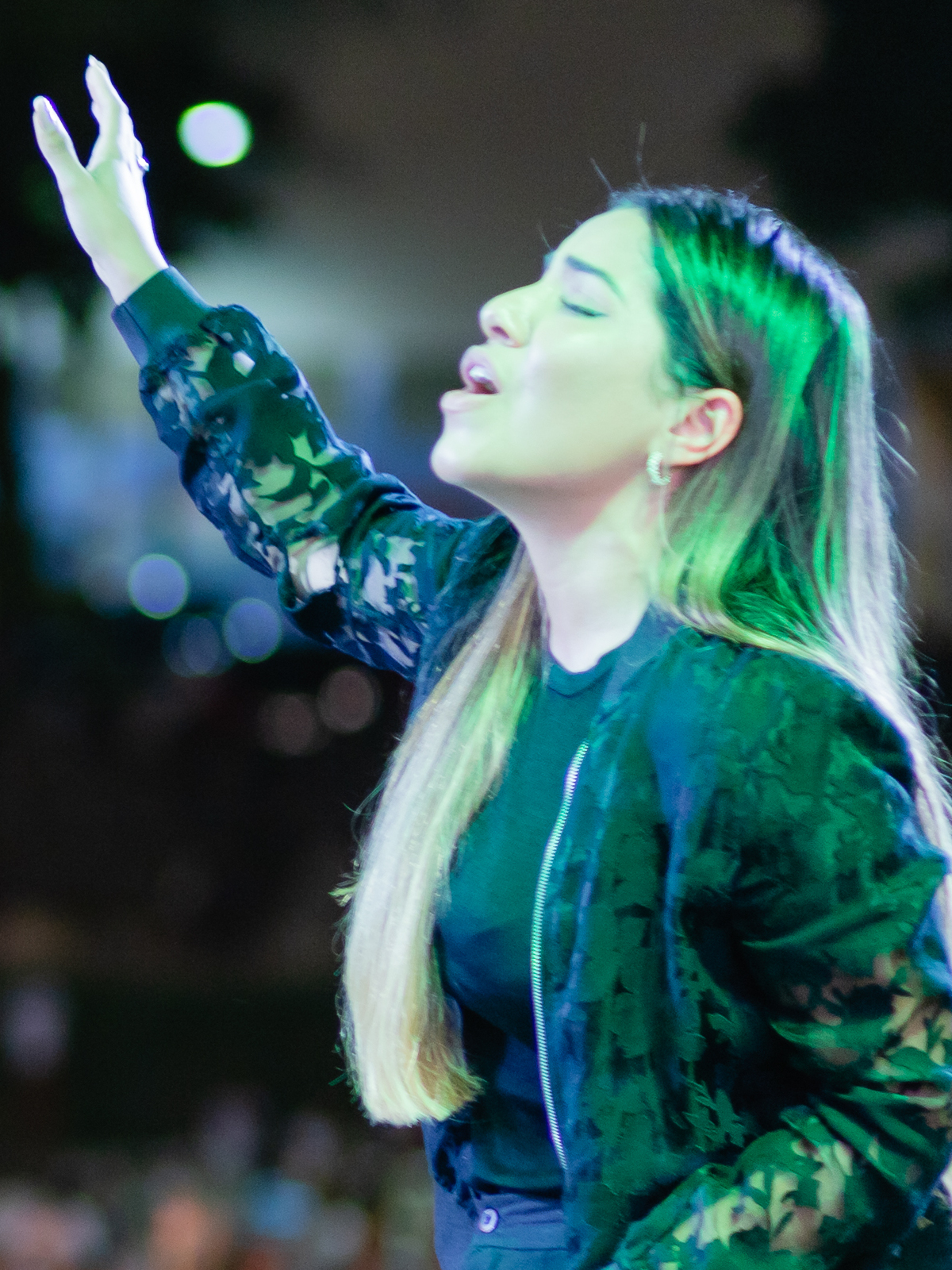
- Gabriela Rocha in 2020

Background information
- Born: 13 March 1994 (age 32); São Paulo, Brazil
- Genres: Contemporary Christian music, contemporary worship music, pop rock
- Occupations: Singer, songwriter
- Instrument: Vocals
- Years active: 2007–present
- Labels: Sony Music, Onimusic
- Website: gabrielarocha.com.br

Gabriela Rocha Corrêa Moreira (born March 13, 1994) is a Brazilian Christian worship singer and songwriter. She is one of the main singers of contemporary Christian music in Brazil and the singer of the genre with the largest YouTube channel in the world and is the most listened to Christian music artist on the main digital platforms, Spotify, iTunes, Apple Music and Deezer. She has recorded with various artists such as Elevation Worship, CeCe Winans and Michael W. Smith. Her YouTube channel has over 3 billion views.

== Life and career ==
Gabriela Rocha was brought up in a Christian household and, at the age of five, she was already singing in the church. She became known through the Jovens Talentos contest, on Raul Gil's television program, where she joined in March 2006 and won in May 2007. After winning the contest, she would participate in the segment Homenagem ao Artista (English: Tribute to the Artist) between the years 2007 and 2010, in the same show. Her definitive immersion in the Christian music genre took place in this framework from the year 2008, when she made striking performances, honoring the singers Aline Barros and Ana Paula Valadão, in the presence of both. Since her childhood, Ana Paula Valadão, has been her greatest musical influence. In November of the same year, under the Luar Music label, at the time owned by Raul Gil Jr. (Raul Gil's son), she released her first album in partnership with gospel singer Elias dos Santos (also ex-Jovens Talentos), entitled Irmãos na Fé.

The first big hit of her career would come in 2010 in a presentation on the Raul Gil Program, when she sang "Aleluia" (Leonard Cohen's own version for Hallelujah), which at the time reached thousands of views on YouTube. The following year, she participated in the recording of the live album by singer Thalles, where both performed a duet on the song "Nada Além de Ti", which was successful throughout Brazil and occupied the first place on the segment's radio, the that definitively enshrined the young singer on Christian music.

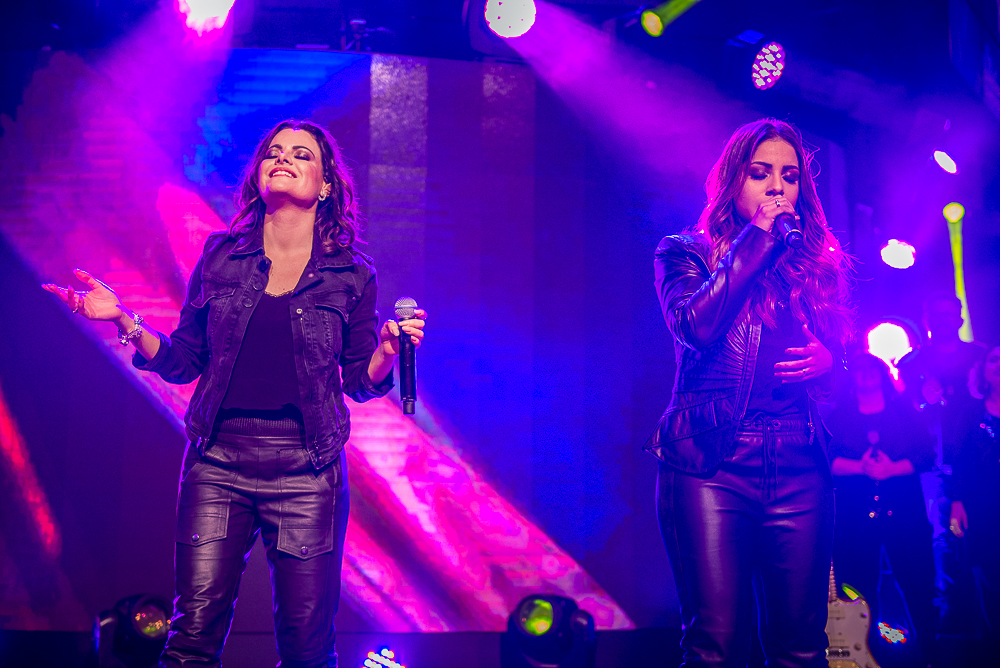
The singer singing along with her main musical reference, Ana Paula Valadão.

On 28 July 2012, Rocha signed with Sony Music, releasing her first album, titled Jesus, which was produced by the singer Thalles Roberto and released in the same year. Her second work, released in December 2014, was produced by Daniela and Jorginho Araújo, and had the title Pra Onde Iremos?. Her participation in the song "Ninguém Explica Deus" with the gospel group Preto no Branco became one of her greatest hits, entering the ranking of the most played songs in Brazil, surpassing 500 million views on YouTube and becoming the Christian music with the most views on the platform. Two years later, in 2016 she released her first live album, Até Transbordar, produced by Hananiel Eduardo. The work, recorded at Lagoinha Church in Niterói, Brazil, was distributed on CD and DVD and received the participation of singers Leonardo Gonçalves and Fernandinho.

In 2017, after 5 years on the label Sony Music, Rocha signed with Onimusic, and in February 2018, released the unpublished EP Céu, which was produced by Hananiel Eduardo. Among these songs, the hit "Lugar Secreto" went viral on the internet, reaching more than 200 million views on YouTube in less than a year. After this result, the singer's career strengthened in the market, becoming one of the most well-known evangelical singers today. She is the singer of the segment with the largest YouTube channel in the world and is the most listened to Christian music artist on the main digital platforms, Spotify, iTunes, Apple Music and Deezer.

In 2019, the singer was invited by Ana Paula Valadão to participate in the 19th album of the band Diante do Trono, Outra Vez, where they duet in the song "Santo Espírito". In May of that year, Rocha released the book "Jesus Todo Dia", by Editora Gente. Every amount collected from book sales was donated to GRAACC (a hospital that fights childhood cancer). Also in November of that year, she released the song "Diz" (Portuguese version of the song "You Say" by Lauren Daigle) for the promotion of the film "Overcomer" by the Kendrick Brothers.

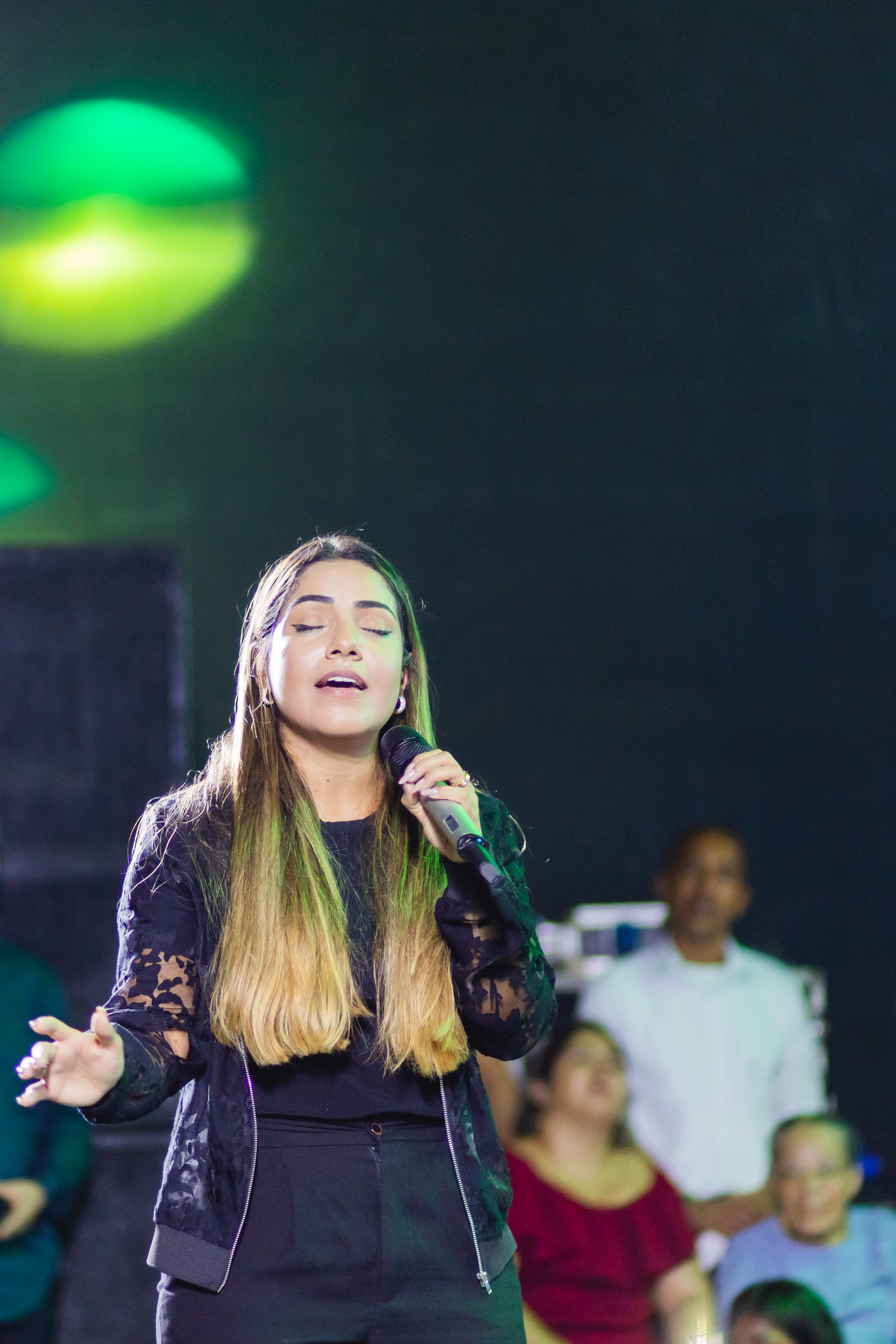
Festival Alterna Olinda (2020)

In 2020, she released the EP Hosana, with the participation of Lukas Agustinho and Weslei Santos. During the Coronavirus pandemic, the singer performed a live solidarity on her YouTube channel with the participation of Mariana Valadão. In partnership with the Federal Government of Brazil, all money raised from the live is donated to the Solidary Collection campaign, of the Pátria Volunária program, led by the first lady, Michelle Bolsonaro. The live with the title "Juntos em Adoração" surpassed 5 million views, later the singer released an album with the same title and a podcast containing devotionals. In the same year, the singer carried out several projects in partnership with international singers, releasing the single "Lugar Secreto" in Spanish, with Christine D'Clario, also released two singles with Kim Walker-Smith, "Teu Espírito" and "Seu Nome" é Amor" and another one with the American worship band, Elevation Worship, "Vida aos Sepulcros".

== Discography ==
Albums

- Jesus (2012)
- Pra Onde Iremos? (2014)
- #SML (2016)
- Até Transbordar (2016)
- Juntos em Adoração (2020)
- A Presença (2023)
- A Igreja (2024)

EP's

- Gabriela Rocha (2016)
- Céu (2018)
- Hosana (2019)
- Ecoar (2021)
- Ecoar 2 (2021)

Singles

- "Atos 2" (2016)
- "Me Aproximou" (2016)
- "Meu Salvador" (2016)
- "Lugar Secreto" (2017)
- "Hosana" (2019)
- "Eu e o Rei" (2019)
- "Estou Seguro" (2019)
- "Enche-me" (with Isaias Saad) (2019)
- "Leão" (2019)
- "Diz" (2019)
- "A Ele a Glória" (2019)
- "Lugar Secreto (Español)" (with Christine D'Clario) (2020)
- "Teu Espírito" (with Kim Walker-Smith) (2020)
- "Até Te Encontrar" (with Rebeca Carvalho) (2020)
- "Seu Nome é Amor" (with Kim Walker-Smith) (2020)
- "Vida aos Sepulcros" (with Elevation Worship) (2020)
- “Me Atraiu” (2023)

== Bibliography ==
- "Jesus Todo Dia" (2019)
