= Viviane Batidão =

Brazilian singer-songwriter (born 1984)

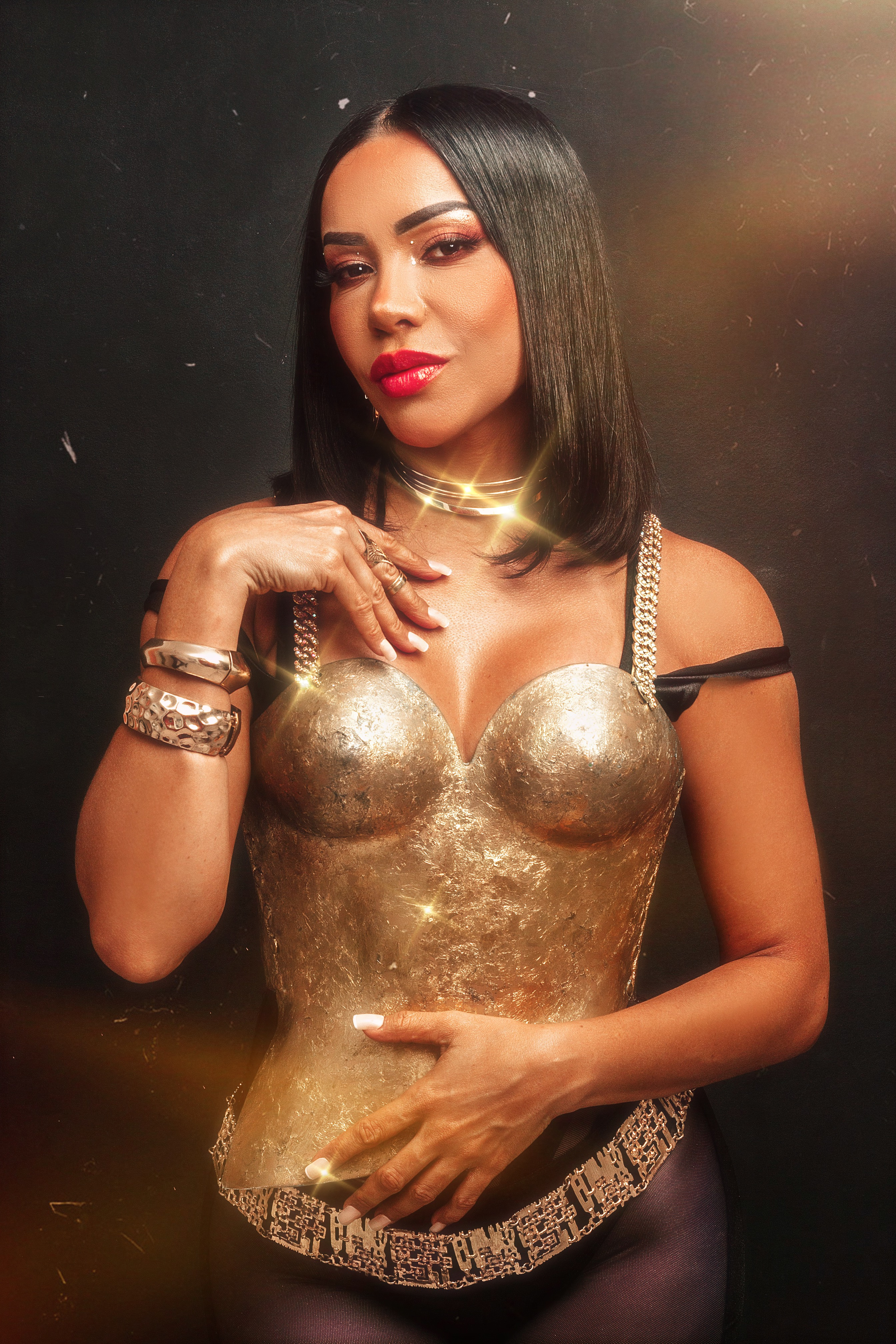
- Batidão in 2025
- Born: Antônia Viviane Mendes de Oliveira; 6 March 1984 (age 42); Santa Isabel do Pará, Pará, Brazil
- Occupation: singer
- Years active: 2014–present
- Musical career
- Genres: MPB, jazz

Antônia Viviane Mendes de Oliveira (born 6 March 1984), known professionally as Viviane Batidão, is a Brazilian singer-songwriter. She is nicknamed Rainha do Tecnomelody ('Queen of Tecnomelody').

== Life and career ==
Born in Santa Isabel do Pará, as a child Batidão was a member of the choir at her local Catholic church. At 15 years old she started performing professionally as the vocalist in some local bands, and in 2007 she adopted her stage name and made her recording debut with the single "Vem meu amor", which turned to be a radio hit. Following another hit she co-wrote with her cousin, "Big som", she started holding concerts in other Brazilian states, and in 2010 she made her national television debut in the TV Globo's variety show Domingão do Faustão.

In 2015, Batidão released the live album Ao Vivo no Portal da Amazônia, recorded in front of an audience of about 50,000 people. In 2024, she was nominated at the Multishow Brazilian Music Awards with the song "Outra Vez" in the Braga de Ano category, and won the award for the Brazil category.

== Discography ==
Albums

- Ao Vivo no Portal da Amazônia (live, 2015)
- Sucessos (2019)
- Marcantes (2019)
- Viviane Batidão (Acústico) (2019)
- Homenagem ao Brega (live, 2019)
- No Ritmo das Aparelhagens (2020)
- Rock da Rainha (2022)
