= Isadora Pompeo =

Brazilian Christian musician

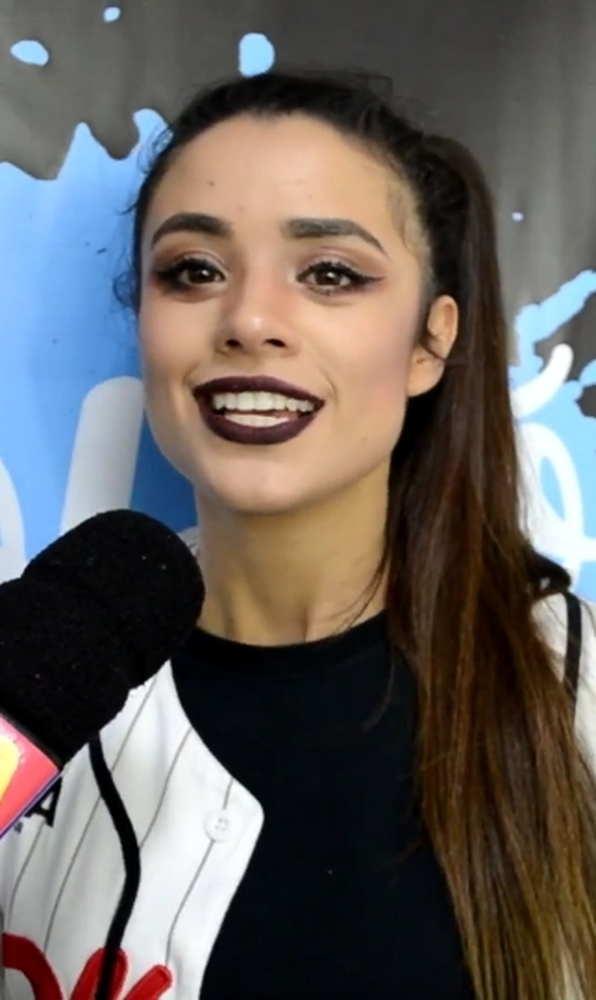
- Isadora Pompeo in 2018.

Background information
- Born: 30 May 1999 (age 27); Caxias do Sul, RS, Brazil
- Genres: Contemporary Christian music, contemporary worship music, pop rock
- Occupations: Singer, songwriter
- Instruments: Vocals, guitar, ukulele, piano, drums
- Years active: 2016–present
- Labels: Musile Records (2017-2022); Sony Music (2023-present)
- Website: isadorapompeo.com

Isadora Pompeo (born May 30, 1999) is a Brazilian vlogger, singer and songwriter of Christian music. She released her first studio album, Pra Te Contar os Meus Segredos, produced by Hananiel Eduardo in 2017.

== Career ==
Known for gospel song covers, Isadora has more than 4.2 million subscribers and 452 million views on her YouTube channel. Selected by Google as one of the musical bets of the year 2017, she launched, through Musile Records, her first studio album, Pra Te Contar os Meus Segredos.

== Discography ==
=== Albums ===
==== From the studio ====
Albums	Details
Processo	Launch: February 25, 2021; Formats: Streaming, download digital; Record label: Musile; Faixas do álbum: 1. História; 2. Seja Forte; 3. Máscaras (part. João Figueiredo); 4. Processo; 5. Em Troca; 6. Você Não Cansa; 7. Sua Paz

==== Live ====
Albums	Details
Pra Te Contar os Meus Segredos	Launch: November 28, 2017; Format: DVD, streaming, download digital; Record label: Musile; Faixas do álbum: 1. Intro; 2. Guia-Me; 3. Deus Perfeito; 4. Preciso Entender; 5. Minha Morada; 6. Toca em Mim de Novo; 7. Tua Alegria (part. Rebeca Carvalho); 8. Grito dos Apaixonados; 9. Hey, Pai (part. Marcela Taís); 10. Oi, Jesus; 11. Eu Sei Que Vem; 12. O Nome de Jesus; 13. O Teu Amor
Tetelestai	Launch: August 15, 2024; Formats: DVD, streaming, download digital; Record label: Sony; Faixas do álbum: 1. A Alegria; 2. Azeite; 3. Minha Alma Te Ama; 4. Canção de Paulo; 5. Ovelhinha; 6. Aliança; 7. Cruz em Ti; 8. Se Eu Pudesse; 9. Bênçãos Que Não Têm Fim (Counting My Blessings); 10. Bênçãos Que Não Têm Fim/Counting My Blessings (feat. Seph Schlueter); 11. Tetelestai; 12. Eu Tudo Posso

==== Collaborative albums ====
===== Live =====
Album	Details
Aurora (com Julliany Souza)	Launch: July 22, 2022; Formats: Streaming, download digital; Record label: Part; Faixas do álbum: 1. Casinha Favorita; 2. Tu És Tudo (part. Leo Brandão); 3. Assume a Responsa; 4. A Casa é Tua / Labareda; 5. Diante de Ti

=== Extended plays (EPs) ===
EP	Details
Musile Sessions	Launch: N/A; Formats: DVD; Record label: Musile; Faixas do extended play: 1. Guia-Me; 2. Deus Perfeito; 3. Toca em Mim de Novo; 4. Oi, Jesus; 5. O Nome de Jesus; 6. O Teu Amor

=== Singles ===
==== As lead artist ====
List of singles with selected chart positions
Song	Year	Peak chart positions	Certifications (sales threshold)	Album
Song	Year	BRA	Certifications (sales threshold)	Album
"Guia-Me"	2016	—		Musile Sessions
"Deus Perfeito"	2016	—		Musile Sessions
"Toca em Mim de Novo"	2017	—		Musile Sessions
"Oi, Jesus"	2017	—		Musile Sessions
"O Nome de Jesus"	2017	—		Musile Sessions
"O Teu Amor"	2017	—		Musile Sessions
"Como Nunca Antes"	2018	—		Non-album singles
"Braços de Amor"	2019	—		Non-album singles
"História"	2020	—		Processo
"Seja Forte"	2020	—		Processo
"Máscaras" (with João Figueiredo)	2020	—		Processo
"Processo"	2020	—		Processo
"Em Troca"	2020	—		Processo
"Você Não Cansa"	2020	—		Processo
"Sua Paz"	2020	—		Processo
"Resultado"	2021	—		Non-album singles
"Vai Passar"	2021	—		Non-album singles
"Primeira Canção (Música dos Passarinhos"	2021	—		Non-album singles
"Tranquilo"	2021	—		Non-album singles
"10 Anos"	2021	—		Non-album singles
"Não Há o Que Temer"	2022	—		Non-album singles
"Ela Brilha"	2022	—		Non-album singles
"Casinha Favorita" (with Julliany Souza)	2022	—		Aurora
"Tu És Tudo" (with Julliany Souza, part. Leo Brandão)	2022	—		Aurora
"Assume a Responsa" (with Julliany Souza)	2022	—		Aurora
"Diante de Ti" (wit Julliany Souza)	2022	—		Aurora
"A Casa é Sua / Labareda" (with Julliany Souza)	2022	—		Aurora
"Vou Me Humilhar"	2022	—		Non-album singles
"Bênçãos Que Não Tem Fim" (Seph Schlueter cover)	2023	9	BRA: 2× Diamond	Non-album singles
"Tetelestai" (with Carol Tauber)	2024	—		Tetelestai
"Azeite"	2024	—		Tetelestai
"Ovelhinha"	2024	—	BRA: 2× Platinum	Tetelestai
"Aliança"	2024	—		Tetelestai
"Cruz em Ti"	2024	—		Tetelestai
"Bênçãos Que Não Têm Fim (Counting My Blessings)" (versão ao vivo)	2024	—		Tetelestai
"Se Eu Pudesse"	2024	—		Tetelestai
"Bênçãos Que Não Têm Fim (Counting My Blessings)" (com Seph Schlueter)	2024	—		Tetelestai

==== As a guest artist ====
Ano	Canção	Álbum	Certificados
2017	"Seu Amor" (DJ PV part. Isadora Pompeo e Eli Soares)	Não adicionado há nenhum álbum	
2017	"Espero Por Ti" (Gabriel Guedes de Almeida part. Isadora Pompeo)	Não adicionado há nenhum álbum	
2018	"Desperta" (Unidade Cristã part. Isadora Pompeo, Netto e Pedro Siqueira)	Wake17	
2019	"Bem Perto" (Isaias Saad e Isadora Pompeo)	Não adicionado há nenhum álbum	
2019	"Tu És Santo" (Julia Vitória e Isadora Pompeo)	Não adicionado há nenhum álbum	
2020	"Nada Pode Calar Um Adorador" (Eyshila e Isadora Pompeo)	Tudo Volta ao Seu Lugar	Platina
2021	"Deus Faz Além" (Bruna Olly e Isadora Pompeo)	Não adicionado há nenhum álbum	
2021	"Eu Tenho Você" (Marcelo Markes e Isadora Pompeo)	Eu Tenho Você	
2021	"Dono dos Meus Dias" (Daniela Araújo e Isadora Pompeo)	Não adicionado há nenhum álbum	
2022	"Cuido dos Detalhes" (André & Felipe e Isadora Pompeo)	Não adicionado há nenhum álbum	
2022	"Eu Tenho Você (Remix)" (DJ PV, Marcelo Markes e Isadora Pompeo)	Me Faz Viver	
2022	"Confio em Ti" (Thaiane Seghetto e Isadora Pompeo)	Não adicionado há nenhum álbum	
2023	"Nem Um Segundo" (Gabriel Pompeo e Isadora Pompeo)	Não adicionado há nenhum álbum	
2023	"Saudade" (Thalles Roberto e Isadora Pompeo)	Deixa Vir - Vol 2	
2024	"Meu Filho" (Com Sued Silva, Stella Laura e Isadora Pompeo)	Não adicionado há nenhum álbum	

== Awards and nominations ==
- Between 2017 and 2019, the artist was nominated and won in several categories in the Gerando Salvação Trophy.
