= Lauana Prado =

Brazilian singer and songwriter (born 1989)

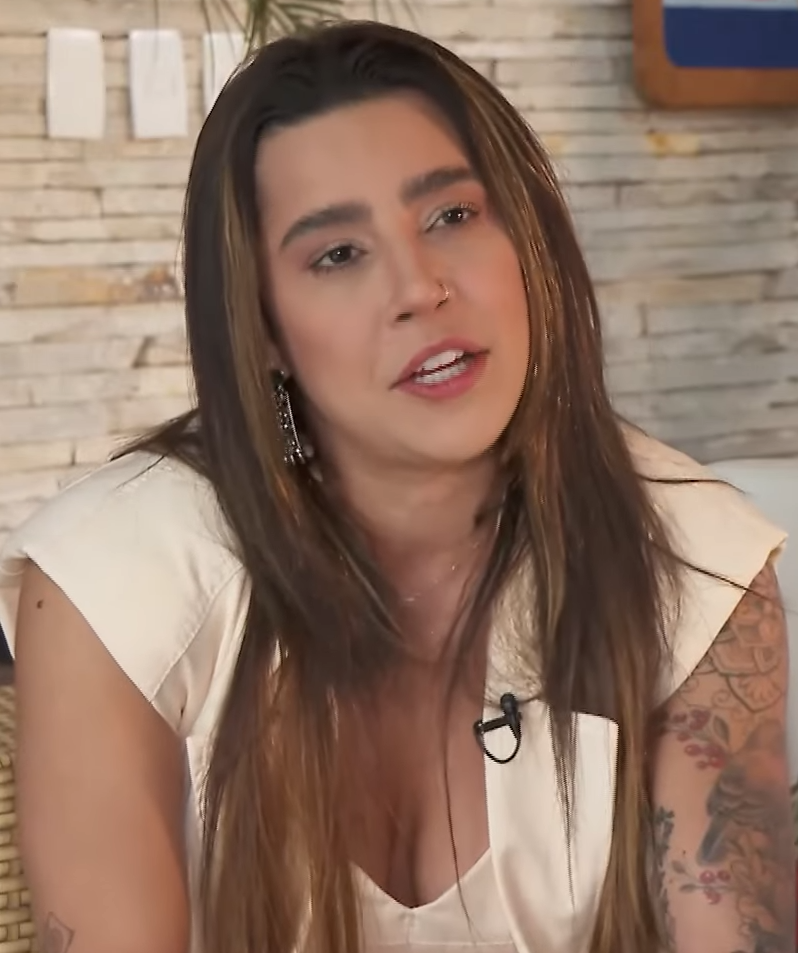
- Prado in March 2024
- Born: Mayara Lauana Pereira e Vieira do Prado; 25 May 1989 (age 37); Goiânia, Goiâs, Brazil
- Other name: Mayara Prado
- Occupations: Singer; songwriter; record producer; arranger
- Years active: 2011–present
- Spouse: Tati Dias (m. 2026)
- Children: 1
- Musical career
- Genre: Sertanejo
- Instruments: Vocals; violin; guitar; piano; ukulele
- Labels: Sony Music Brasil (2014–2015); Universal Music (2016–present)

Mayara Lauana Pereira e Vieira do Prado (born 25 May 1989) is a Brazilian singer, songwriter, record producer and arranger.

At the start of her career, she took part in several TV talent shows, including The Voice Brasil, in which she was a semi-finalist under the stage name Mayara Prado. She later signed with Sony Music Brasil and released an EP and an album. In 2016, she changed her stage name to Lauana Prado and achieved her national breakthrough two years later with the EP Lauana Prado, which featured the hit "Cobaia". In the following years, she released albums such as Livre (2020), Natural (2022) and Ao Vivo em Brasília (2023), as well as a tour of re-recordings, which spawned albums such as Raiz (2022) and Raiz Goiânia (2023).

Prado is known as one of the main names in the feminejo movement and for her musical approach, which mixes genres such as sertanejo, rock and reggae, as well as more positive lyrics. She has also worked as a songwriter, with songs recorded by sertanejo artists such as Roberta Miranda, Edson & Hudson and Rionegro & Solimões.

== Early life and education ==
Prado was born in Goiânia and grew up in the municipality of Araguaína, in Tocantins. At the time, she began performing in bars and gave her first concerts. She later graduated from the Federal University of Maranhão with a degree in communication studies.

== Musical career ==
Before becoming a well-known performer, Prado used the stage name Mayara Prado and took part in talent shows, including The Voice Brasil, where she was a semi-finalist on Carlinhos Brown's team. She also appeared on the Jovens Talentos and Mulheres que Brilham sections of the program Programa Raul Gil. Her victory earned her a record deal with Sony Music Brasil. In 2014, Prado presented her debut EP Mayara Prado, which featured Turma do Pagode on “Pó Para” and Marcos & Belutti on “Linguagem dos Beijos”. The following year, the repertoire was expanded for her first studio album 24 Horas por Segundo. Both albums failed to gain commercial success.

The change from her stage name to her current one was adopted at the suggestion of Fernando Zor, one half of the duo Fernando & Sorocaba. With the change, Prado released her second studio album Ensaio Acústico, which featured songs such as "Duvido que Vamos Brigar Novamente". Prado made a name for herself in 2018 with the song "Cobaia", featuring the sertanejo duo Maiara & Maraisa. The song reached around 10 million views in around two months of release and was part of the EP Lauana Prado. The singer then went on to record the live album Verdade (2019), which included a re-recording of Cobaia and new songs with the participation of Fernando & Sorocaba and Gabriel Diniz.

In 2020, the complete edition of Livre was released, recorded at the Hopi Hari amusement park in São Paulo, with special appearances by Matheus & Kauan, Bruno & Marrone, Fernando Zor and the band Maneva, with songs such as "Viva Voz", "Beijo Amador", "Sua Mãe Tá Nessa", "Você Humilha" and "Suor da Sua Boca".

In 2022, Prado released her third studio album Natural, whose repertoire was recorded in the Jalapão State Park under the production of Gabriel Pascoal. With songs such as "Primeiro Eu", “Zap” and “Terminou Com Calma”, it was her second work nominated for a Latin Grammy in the category of Best Sertaneja Music Album. In the same year, she presented the live album Raiz, made up of re-recordings of sertanejo songs, with musical production by Henrique Souza. The project led to a follow-up and subsequent tour in 2023 with the album Raiz Goiânia, with musical production by Prado and William Santos. The re-recording of “Escrito nas Estrelas”, originally by Tetê Espíndola, went viral on social media. Also in 2023, Prado released the album Ao Vivo em Brasília, produced by Ivan Miyazato, and comprising songs such as "Desandei", "Tanto Faz" and "Whisky Vagabund0".

In 2024, Prado presented the album Transcende, recorded live at the Ginásio do Ibirapuera, with the participation of Zé Neto & Cristiano, Nando Reis, Simone Mendes and Cristinas, produced by Eduardo Pepato.

On 3 July 2026, Prado was announced as a new coach for The Voice Brasil, replacing Duda Beat for the fourteenth season.

== Musical style and influences ==
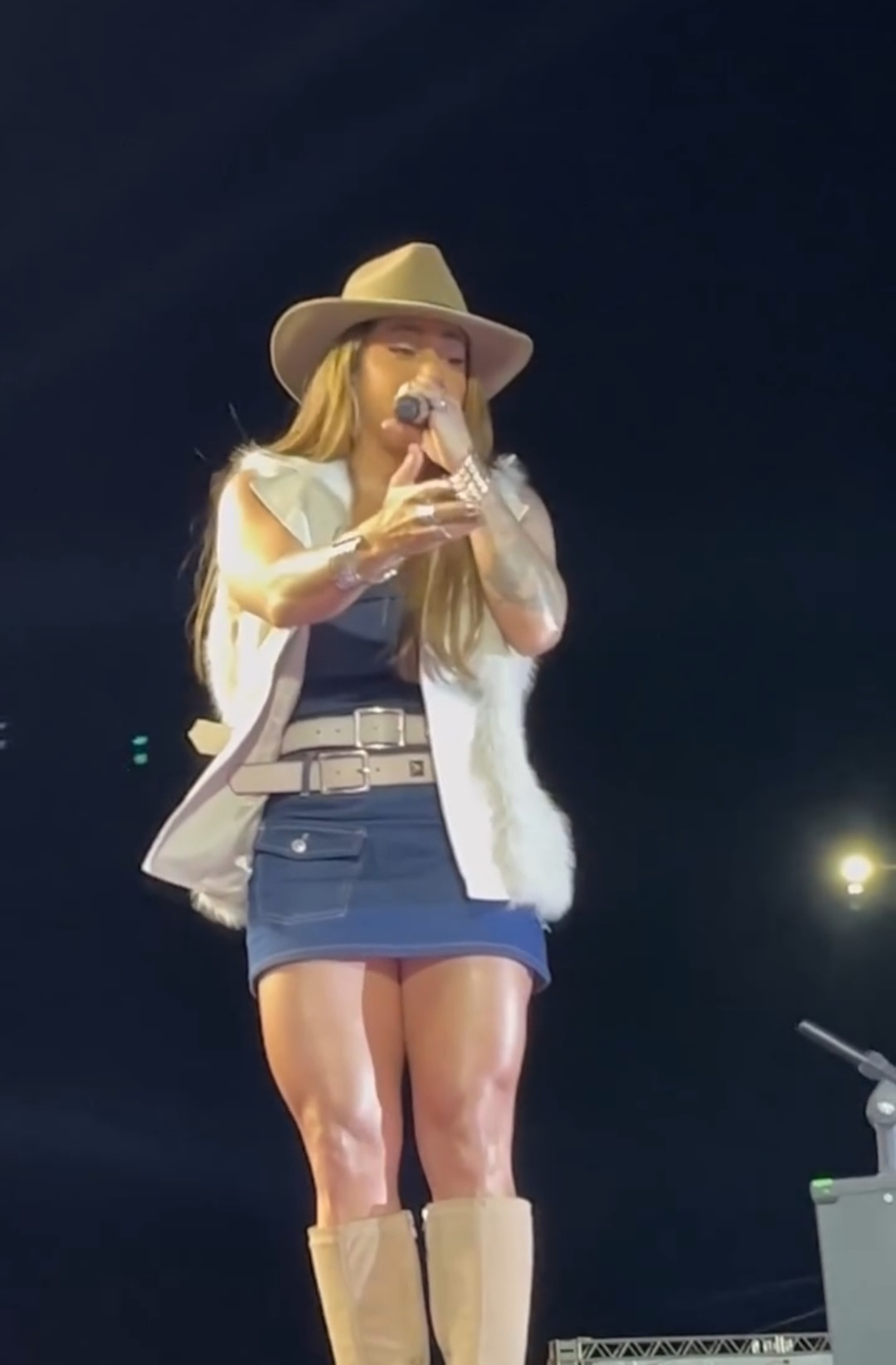
Lauana Prado performing in Gouveia Minas Gerais.

Prado is described as a sertanejo artist who flirts with various genres, such as reggae and rock, genres that she says she had significant contact with when she lived in the state of Maranhão. She has also collaborated with artists from different musical segments, such as forró singer Xand Avião, rapper Edi Rock and pagode band Sorriso Maroto.

Prado's repertoire is also characterized as more positive compared to other names on the country scene. She told G1 that "I believe that my way of speaking and singing country music is much more optimistic, with a positive outcome, of things having worked out, rather than you suffering, banging your head. I think it's sensational, I respect it, I love it, but it's not my truth. I really like to talk about well-resolved love, the intense feeling, when you manage to achieve something positive."

About the singer, composer Carlos Rennó said in 2023 that Prado is "a popular singer whose goals include raising the artistic level of sertanejo music, in addition to her non-conservative behavior, if we consider artists in general of this genre of music."

== Personal life ==
Prado is openly bisexual. In an interview with Istoé magazine in 2021, she said: "For me, within the scope of my personal life, I have always lived my sexuality freely. It has never been taboo and I defend my bisexuality as a woman. It's such an intimate subject that it's been very veiled. Our speeches came out very naturally. I never put any weight on the issue. I've had relationships with men with the same intensity."

On 28 June 2026, Prado married Tati Dias in a beach ceremony in São Paulo. On 31 July 2026, she had given birth to their first child.

== Discography ==
=== Studio albums ===
List of studio albums, with sales figures and certifications
Title	Details	Sales	Certifications
24 Horas por Segundo	Released: 31 July 2015; Formats: CD, digital download, streaming; Label: Sony Music Brasil		
Ensaio Acústico	Released: 11 November 2016; Formats: CD, digital download, streaming; Gravadora: Universal Music		
Natural	Released: 10 March 2022; Formats: CD, digital download, streaming; Label: Universal Music	PMB: 40,000	PMB: Gold

=== Live albums ===
List of live albums, with sales figures and certifications
Title	Details	Sales	Certifications
Verdade	Released: 6 December 2018; Formats: DVD, digital download, streaming; Label: Universal Music	PMB: 160,000	PMB: 3× Platinum
Livre	Released: 2020; Formats: DVD, digital download, streaming; Label: Universal Music	PMB: 160,000	PMB: 2× Platinum
Raiz	Released: 29 June 2022; Formats: DVD, digital download, streaming; Label: Universal Music	PMB: 40,000	PMB: Gold
Ao Vivo em Brasília	Released: 11 August 2023; Formats: DVD, digital download, streaming; Label: Universal Music		
Raiz Goiânia	Released: 12 October 2023; Formats: DVD, digital download, streaming; Label: Universal Music		PMB: 2× Diamond
Transcende	Released: 1 May 2025; Formats: DVD, digital download, streaming; Label: Universal Music		
Raiz BH	Released: 25 September 2025; Formats: DVD, digital download, streaming; Label: Universal Music		

=== Extended plays (EP) ===
List of EPs
Title	Details
Mayara Prado	Released: 25 November 2014; Formats: Digital download, streaming; Label: Sony Music Brasil
Lauana Prado	Released: 8 June 2018; Formats: Digital download, streaming; Label: Universal Music

=== Singles ===
==== As featured artist ====
List of singles as lead artist, with chart positions and certifications, showing year released and album name
Year	Title	Peak chart positions	Certifications	Album
Year	Title	BRA	Certifications	Album
2017	"Meu Coração Não é Hotel"	—		Non-album single
2018	"Cobaia" (feat. Maiara & Maraisa)	36	PMB: 4× Diamond	Verdade
2018	"Liga e Chora" (feat. Gabriel Diniz)	—	PMB: Gold	Verdade
2018	"Batimento de Solteira" (feat. Fernando & Sorocaba)	—	PMB: Gold	Verdade
2019	"Duvido Que Vamos Brigar Novamente" (feat. Edson & Hudson)	—		Verdade
2019	"Melhor Saída"	44	PMB: Diamond	Verdade
2019	"Você Humilha"	15	PMB: 2× Platinum	Verdade
2020	"Viva Voz"	13	PMB: 2× Diamond	Livre
2021	"Sua Mãe Tá Nessa"	22	PMB: 2× Platinum	Natural
2021	"ZAP"	12	PMB: Gold	Natural
2022	"Terminou com Calma" (feat. Juan Marcus & Vinicius)	8		Natural
2022	"Um Sonhador"	13		Raiz
2023	"Whisky Vagabundo"	25		Lauana Prado Ao Vivo em Brasília
2023	"Desandei"	19		Lauana Prado Ao Vivo em Brasília
2023	"Me Leva Pra Casa/ Escrito nas Estrelas/Saudade	1		Lauana Prado Ao Vivo em Brasília
"—" denotes a recording that did not chart or was not released in that territory.
