= Pedro Sampaio =

Brazilian singer and music producer

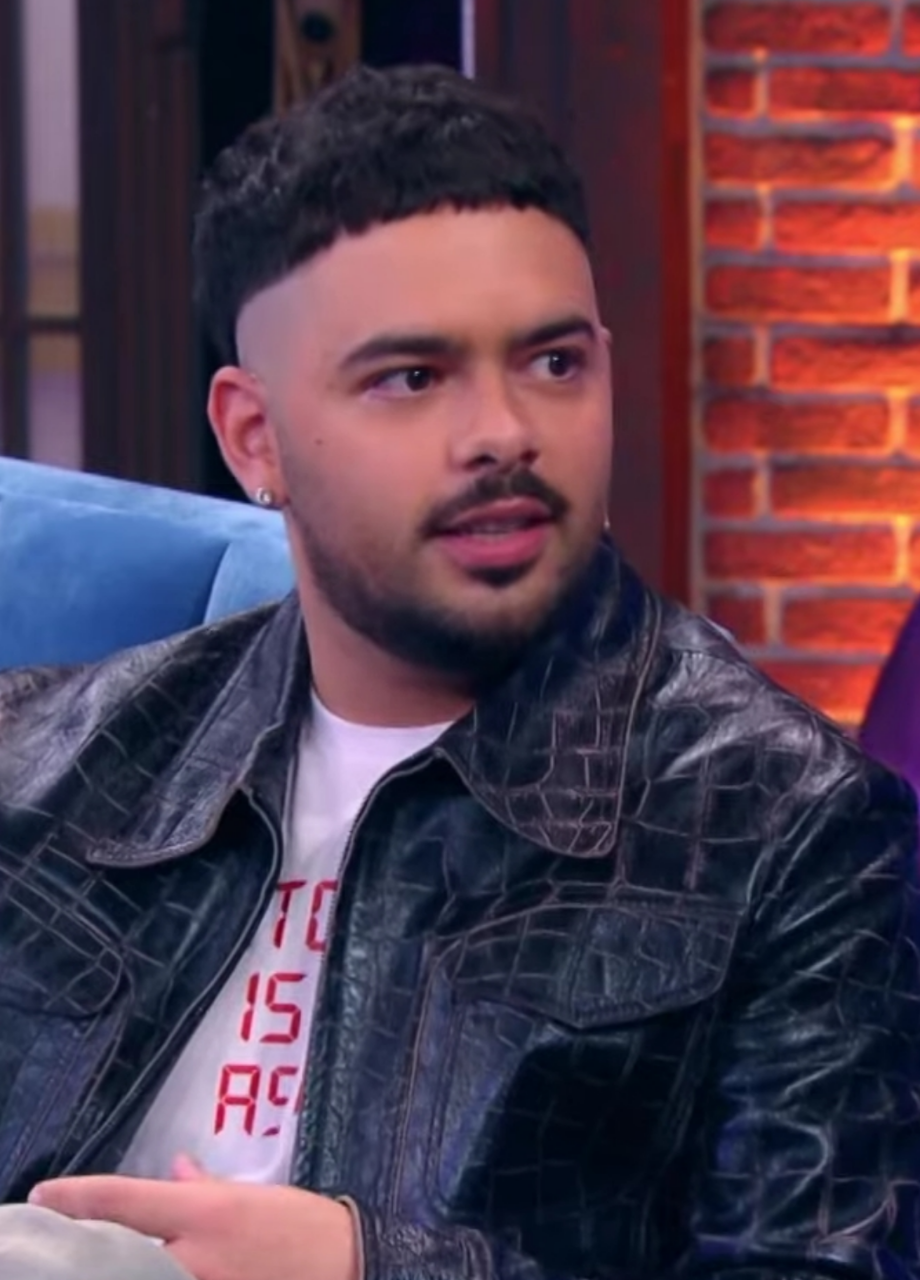
- Sampaio in 2024
- Born: Pedro do Espirito Santo Sampaio; December 21, 1997 (age 28); Rio de Janeiro, Brazil
- Occupations: Music producer, DJ and singer
- Years active: 2017–present
- Partner: Henrique Meinke (2022–2025)
- Musical career
- Instruments: Vocals; keyboards
- Years active: 2012–present
- Label: Warner Music

Pedro do Espirito Santo Sampaio (born December 21, 1997) is a Brazilian singer, music producer and DJ, known for the songs "Sentadão", "Escada do Prédio", with Marina Sena, and "Chama Ela", in partnership with the singer Lexa. He is signed to Warner Music Brasil.

== Career ==
At the age of 13, he began to discover his talent for percussion by playing in a bucket and then convinced his father to buy a tantã, repinique, timbal and tambourine. A year later, he was discovered by Victor Junior when he played as a DJ at a party with his father's friend. He started to dedicate himself more until he reached 17 years old, when he definitely joined Dennis DJ's artist team.

He started his artistic career in 2017, posting videos of remixed versions of songs by other artists on YouTube, which made Pedro gain visibility on the internet and was hired to do shows, with songs sung and produced by himself. In December 2018, he signed a contract with the label Warner Music Brasil.

In 2019, he released the single "Sentadão", with the participation of singer Felipe Original and the production of JS o Mão de Ouro, which quickly became one of the radio's most performed songs, reaching the second position in the Spotify ranking in Brazil and occupying the 194th place in the TOP 200 Global.

== Discography ==
=== Albums ===
- Chama Meu Nome (2022)
- Astro (2024)

=== Singles ===
- "Pocpoc" (2023)
- "Sal" featuring Pabllo Vittar (2022)
- "Olhadinha" featuring Zé Felipe (2022)
- "Dançarina" featuring MC Pedrinho (2022)
- "No chão novinha" featuring Anitta (2022)
- "Vai embora não" featuring Zé Vaqueiro (2022)
- "Surreal" featuring Kvsh (2022)
- "Que pena" featuring MC Don Juan (2022)
- "Forasteiro" featuring Ferrugem (2022)
- "Chama meu nome" featuring MC Jefinho (2022)
- "Bagunça" (2022)
- "Galopa" (2022)
- "Atenção" featuring Luísa Sonza (2021)
- "Fala mal de mim" featuring Daniel Caon e Wesley Safadão (2021)
- "Pervesa" featuring J Balvin, Take A Daytrip (2025)

== Awards and nominations ==
Ano	Award	Category	Nomination	Result
2020	Prêmio Jovem Brasileiro 2020	Melhor Live	Pedro Sampaio	Pending
2020	Prêmio Jovem Brasileiro 2020	Melhor Feat	"Chama Ela" Feat Lexa	Pending
2020	Prêmio Jovem Brasileiro 2020	Melhor Feat	"Balança" Feat WC no Beat & FP do Trem Bala	Pending
2020	Prêmio Jovem Brasileiro 2020	Hit do Ano	"Sentadão" Feat. Felipe Original, JS o Mão de Ouro	Pending
2020	MTV Millennial Awards	Hino do Ano	"Sentadão" Feat. Felipe Original, JS o Mão de Ouro	Pending
2020	MTV Millennial Awards	Artista Musical	Pedro Sampaio	Pending
2020	MTV Millennial Awards	DJ lanso a Braba	Pedro Sampaio	Pending
2020	Prêmio Multishow de Música Brasileira 2020	Música Chiclete	"Sentadão" Feat. Felipe Original, JS o Mão de Ouro	Pending
2025	Berlin Music Video Awards	Best Cinematography	PocPoc	Nominated

== Personal life ==
In 2022, Sampaio came out as bisexual and was in a relationship with Henrique Meinke until December 2025.
