= Liniker =

Brazilian singer-songwriter and activist

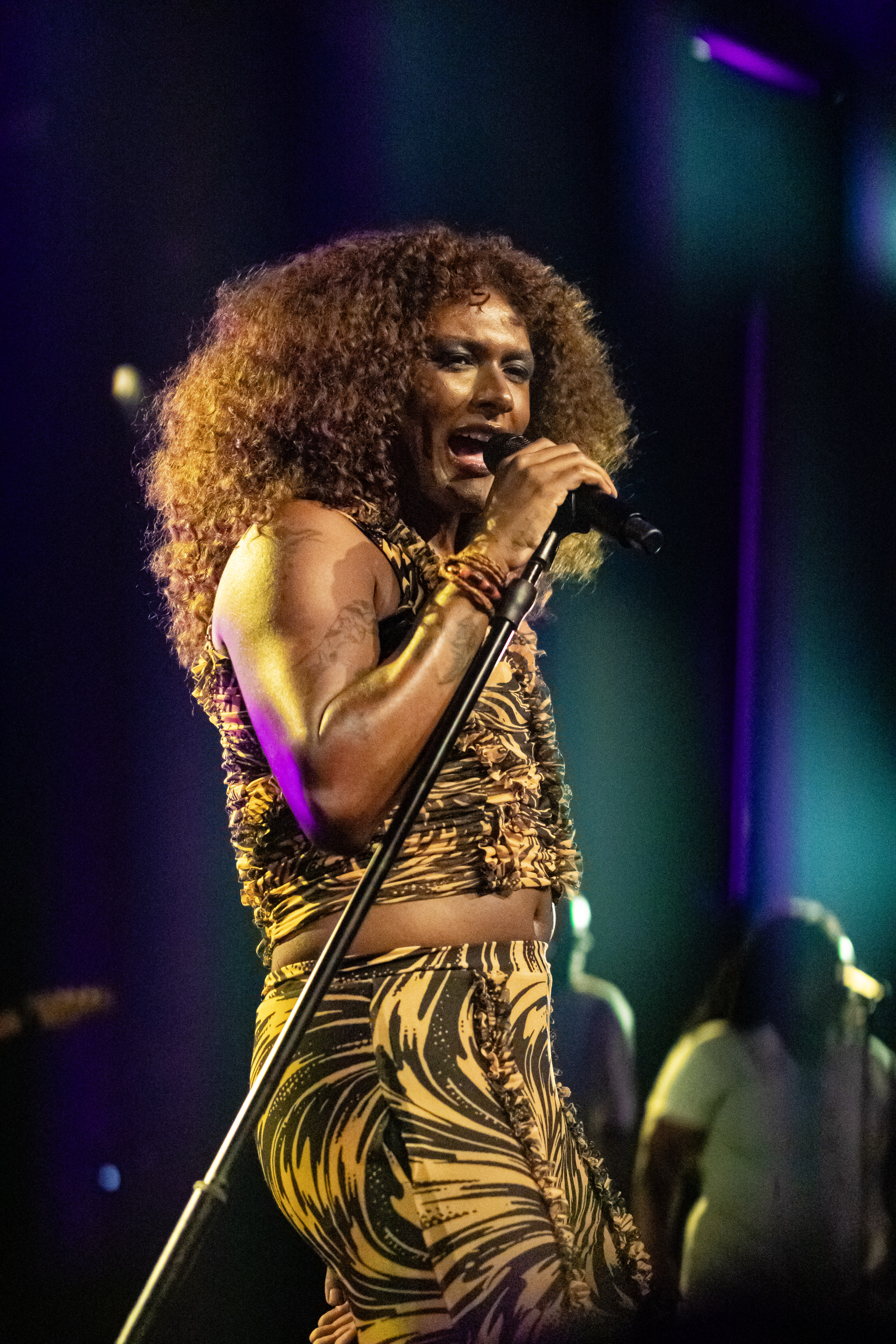
- Liniker at the 2026 Montreux Jazz Festival

Background information
- Born: Liniker de Barros Ferreira Campos; July 3, 1995 (age 31); Araraquara, São Paulo, Brazil
- Genres: Black music, Soul music, Samba rock
- Occupation: Singer
- Years active: 2015–present

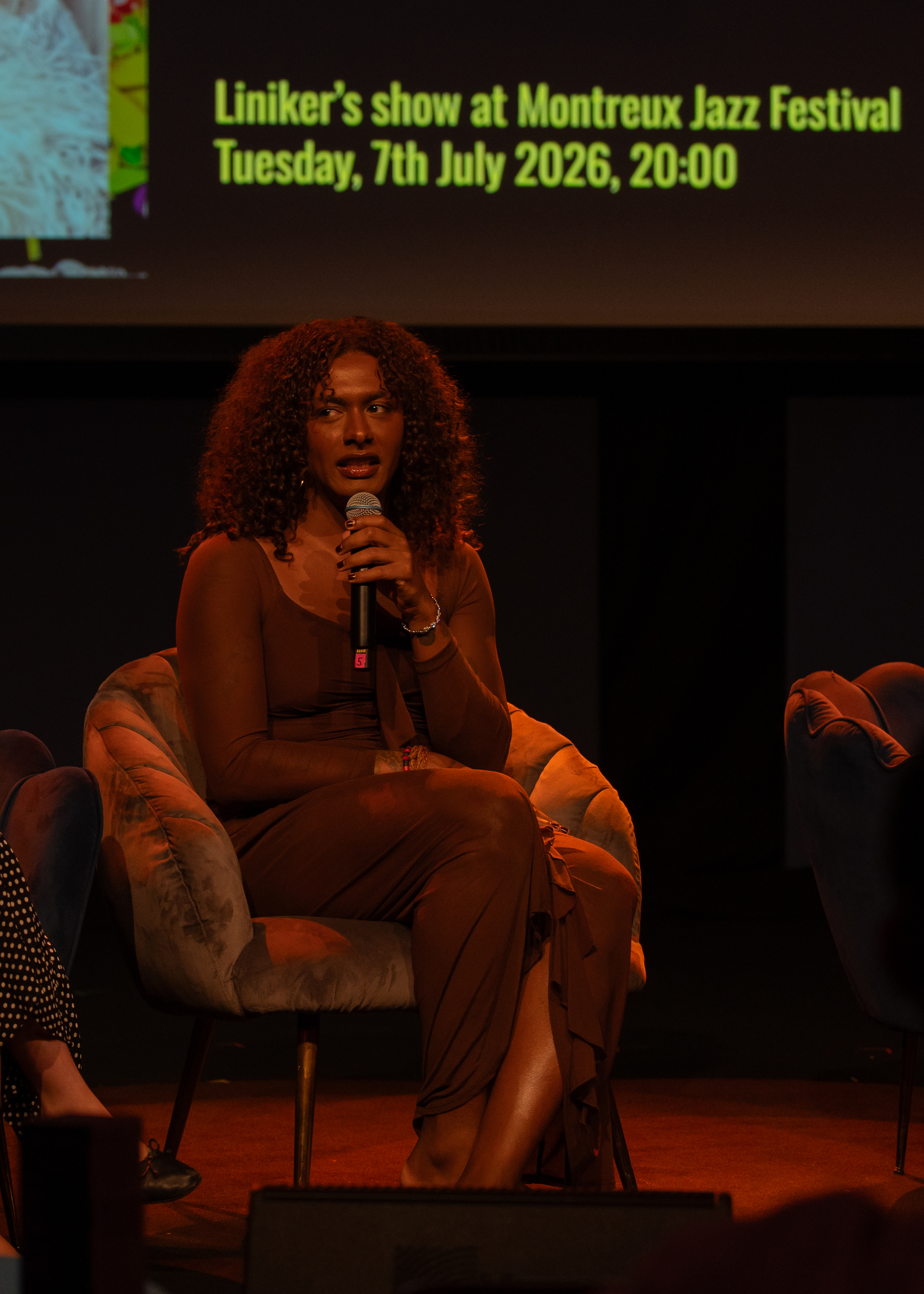
Liniker at the Montreux Jazz Festival 2026.

Liniker de Barros Ferreira Campos (Araraquara, July 3, 1995), widely known as Liniker, is a Brazilian singer-songwriter and former bandleader for Brazilian soul and Black music band Liniker e os Caramelows. Her voice has been described as 'powerful and low-pitched' with a 'slightly raspy, soul-singer' character as well as 'versatile' with a 'recurrent falsetto' and 'easily recognisable timbre', with occasional comparisons arising towards Tim Maia. Liniker is an openly trans woman, and her music is an influence on young Brazilians facing gender discrimination, an audience which 'rarely finds itself represented in Brazilian music'.

== Biography ==
=== Early life and adolescence ===
Liniker was born in the city of Araraquara in rural São Paulo state. Her mother Ângela raised her as a single mother. Liniker reports how she always wanted to wear her mother's clothes: 'I was OK with myself, the city was the problem...when I came back to Araraquara, I thought I'd show them who I really was [by wearing a dress with lipstick and earrings on]. This is when my uncle confronted me, he wanted to know what was going on and gave me one of his clothes to wear so I would learn "how to dress like a man", to which I thanked but said I wasn't taking it. And then my mother said, "Let Liniker be, he's an artist."'

Having grown up in a musical family, Liniker was exposed to samba rock, as well as jazz, soul, and R&B. She started writing songs at age 16. At 18, she left Araraquara to pursue her passion for the arts, especially tap dance and drama. In 2014, she relocated to Santo André to pursue drama school, where she was encouraged by rapper Linn da Quebrada to come out as trans and start wearing her signature skirts-lipstick-turban look on a regular basis.

=== Musical career and activism ===
In 2015, Liniker formed the band Liniker e os Caramelows (formerly Os Caramelows, a play on words with 'caramel' and 'mellow') with friends. Songs are entirely written by Liniker. Their first concert took place when the band was one day old.

The video for the single Zero from EP Cru (Raw) went viral on YouTube, receiving 1.5 million views in the space of a week. In 2016, the band released Remonta (Reassembling). They began touring around Brazil as well as internationally, having performed in Europe, Latin America, Africa and the US. Audiences were able to enjoy the music even though failing to understand their Portuguese lyrics.

In 2019, the album Goela Abaixo (Down My Throat) was nominated for the Latin Grammy Award for Best Portuguese Language Rock or Alternative Album in 2019.

The band describe their music as new Brazilian Black music or "funzy" (a 'nearly indescribable fusion'), highlighting Black music's deep influence throughout Latin America. In Goela Abaixo, elements of Caribbean and African music, as well as verses in English and Spanish are noticeable. In it, Liniker affirms her body as 'political' and exhibits global ambitions as a representative of the African diaspora.

In 2020, after 5 years active, the band have announced their separation with a farewell tour scheduled for the second semester of 2020. This however has not taken place yet due to the consequences of the COVID-19 pandemic. In the meantime, Liniker goes on with her solo career.

Liniker uses her position as a well-known artist to promote social change and represent Black trans culture in a hostile social environment. She feels she has a responsibility to speak up about the violence against queer people in Brazil. However, she also expressed discontent that sometimes, especially during her transition, too much time in interviews was spent discussing her gender, and comparatively little discussing her music.

In November 2022, Liniker became the first trans woman to win a Latin Grammy. She won the category Melhor Álbum de Música Popular Brasileira (Best MPB Album) for her first solo album Indigo Borboleta Anil, which mixes lyrics in English and Portuguese languages and incorporates elements of MPB, R&B, Soul, Jazz, Reggae, beyond Samba. In her speech, she got emotional and highlighted that something historical happened in her country that day.

=== Partnership with Johnny Hooker and Flutua ===
In 2017, Liniker partnered up with Brazilian singer Johnny Hooker on single Flutua (It Floats). The single cover features both singers French kissing. The song is a cry from the heart against homophobia in Brazil. As the lyrics go: 'No one will have the power / to want to tell us how to love.'

=== Views on queer rights ===
When asked if she had a message for conservative people who are against birth control, abortion and gay people, Liniker replied: 'It's my body. I am free to do what I want with it. If I have this entireness, how come you want to stick your nose in it? Who do you think you are to lay down the rules I am supposed to follow? To each their own, to each body its history.'

== Musical influences ==
Liniker lists as her main musical influences Clube do Balanço, Cartola, Elza Soares, Etta James, Nina Simone, Caetano Veloso, Gilberto Gil, Gal Costa, Tulipa Ruiz, Tássia Reis as well as members of her own family.

Liniker was one of the featured performers in a televised musical tribute to Milton Nascimento on the Brazilian TV series Altas Horas in 2023.
