= 2023 Multishow Brazilian Music Awards =

30th edition of the Multishow Brazilian Music Awards held in 2023

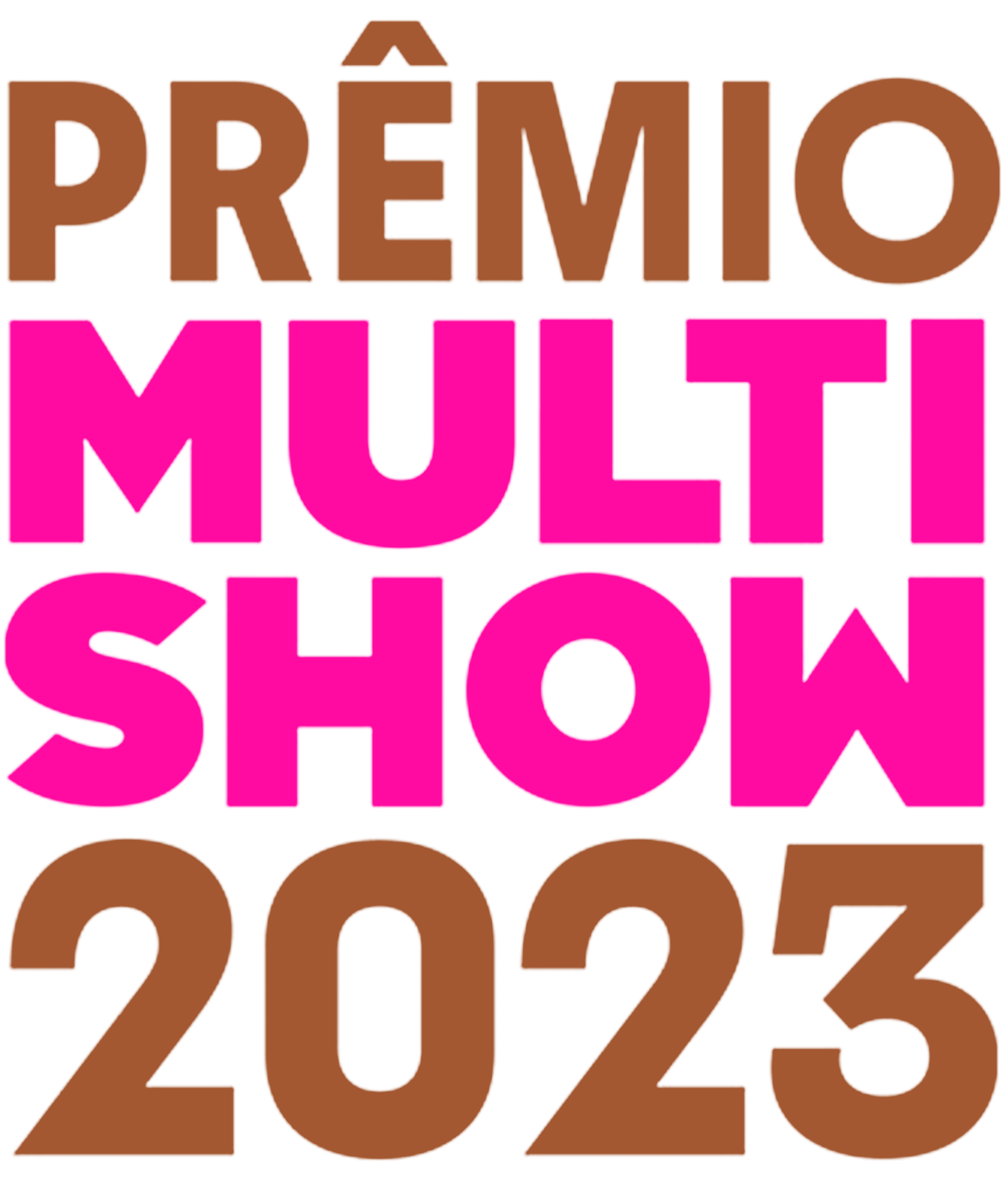
- Date: 7 November 2023
- Location: Jeunesse Arena; Rio de Janeiro, Rio de Janeiro, Brazil
- Hosted by: Ludmilla; Tatá Werneck; Tadeu Schmidt

Highlights
- Most awards: Iza (3)
- Most nominations: Iza; Luísa Sonza (7 each)
- Website: gshow.globo.com/multishow/premio-multishow

Television/radio coverage
- Network: Multishow; TV Globo; Globoplay

The 2023 Multishow Brazilian Music Awards (Portuguese: Prêmio Multishow de Música Brasileira 2023) (or simply 2023 Multishow Awards) (Portuguese: Prêmio Multishow 2023) were held on 7 November 2023, at the Jeunesse Arena in Rio de Janeiro, Brazil. Singer Ludmilla and television presenters Tatá Werneck and Tadeu Schmidt hosted the show. The ceremony was broadcast on Multishow and TV Globo, and streamed on Globoplay. This was the first time the awards were broadcast on Globo's open channel.

The nominations were announced in October 2023. Iza and Luísa Sonza were the most nominated artists with seven nominations each. Iza received the most awards with three, including Artist of the Year.

== Performances ==
=== Pre-show ===
List of performers at the premiere ceremony
Artist(s)	Song(s)
João Gomes Raquel dos Teclados Kadu Martins	"Sonho Lindo" (João Gomes and Raquel dos Teclados) "Halls na Língua" (Kadu Martins) "Meu Pedaço de Pecado" (João Gomes)
Menos é Mais Tarcísio do Acordeon Vitor Fernandes	"Lapada Dela" "Proteção de Tela" "Vou Falar Que Não Quero"

=== Main ceremony ===
List of performers at the 2023 Multishow Brazilian Music Awards
Artist(s)	Song(s)
Pedro Sampaio Gabriel o Pensador Samuel Rosa Joelma NX Zero Tati Quebra Barraco	Remix of "Festa" "Cachimbo da Paz" and "Cachimbo da Paz 2" (Gabriel o Pensador); Remix of "Pesadão", "K.O.", "Modo Turbo", "Todo Mundo Vai Sofrer" "Vou Deixar" (Samuel Rosa); Remix of "Anna Júlia", "Mulher de Fases", "Admirável Chip Novo", "Lança Perfume" and "Exagerado" "Razões e Emoções" (NX Zero); Remix of "Show das Poderosas" and "Bola Rebola" "Boladona"(Tati Quebra Barraco); Remix of "Dançarina" "Voando do Pará" (Joelma)
BK' Tasha & Tracie Filipe Ret MV Bill	"Amanhecer" (BK') "Tang" (Tasha & Tracie) "Deus Perdoa" (Fillipe Ret) "Rap é Compromisso" (MV Bill)
Soweto	"Derê" "Mundo de OZ" "Não Foi A Toa" "Maça do Amor"
Liniker Pitty Gloria Groove	Tribute to Erasmo Carlos "Gente Aberta" (Liniker); Tribute to Rita Lee "Esse Tal de Roque Enrow" (Pitty); Tribute to Gal Costa "Vaca Profana" (Gloria Groove)
Manu Marina Sena Duda Beat Pabllo Vittar	"Sem Ti" (Manu) "Tudo Pra Amar Você" (Marina Sena) "Meu Jeito de Amar" (Duda Beat) "Triste com T" (Pabllo Vittar) "Sem Ti" (Everyone)
Ludmilla MC Nem	"Sintomas de Prazer" and "Senta e Levanta" (Ludmilla); Tribute to MC Katia "Duelo 2" (Everyone)
Jão Melly Iza Lulu Santos	"Alinhamento Milenar" (Jão) "Azul" (Melly) "Fé nas Maluca" (Iza) "Tempos Modenos" (Lulu Santos) "Assim Caminha a Humanidade" (Everyone)
Preto no Branco Aline Barros	"Ninguém Explica Deus" (Preto no Branco) "Jeová Jireh" and "Ressuscita-Me" (Aline Barros)
Michel Teló Simone Mendes	"Fuzuê" (Michel Teló) "Erro Gostoso" (Simone Mendes) "Nuvem de Lágrimas" (Everyone)
Luísa Sonza	"Chico" "La Muerte"
Carlinhos Brown Baianasystem Rachael Reis	"Quixabeira" "Duas Cidades" "Beija-Flor"
Xande de Pilares Caetano Veloso	"Gente"

== Winners and nominees ==
The nominations were announced on 9 October 2023. Iza and Luísa Sonza were the most nominated artists, with seven nominations each, followed by Jão and Ludmilla received six nominations, while Anitta received five nominations and Marina Sena three nominations. Iza won the most awards of the night with three, followed by João Gomes, Ludmilla, Pretinho da Serrinha, Simone Mendes and Xande de Pilares with two each. Winners are listed first and highlighted in bold.

=== Voted categories ===
The winners of the following categories were chosen by fan votes. The winner of the Artist of the Year was chosen by other nominated artists. The five finalists for the Brazil Category—which brought together the 27 most prominent songs from each Brazilian state—were announced on October 15.

Artist of the Year	TVZ Music Video of the Year
**Iza**; Ana Castela; Anitta; Jão; Ludmilla; Luísa Sonza	**"Pilantra" – Jão and Anitta**; "Campo de Morango" – Luísa Sonza; "Conexões de Máfia" – Matuê (featuring Rich the Kid); "Funk Rave" – Anitta; "Fé nas Maluca" – Iza and MC Carol; "Tá OK" – Dennis and Kevin o Chris
Hit of the Year	Show of the Year
**"Erro Gostoso" – Simone Mendes**; "Chico" – Luísa Sonza; "Nosso Quadro" – Ana Castela; "Posturado e Calmo" – Leo Santana; "Tá OK" – Dennis and Kevin o Chris; "Zona de Perigo" – Leo Santana	**Numanice 2023 – Ludmilla**; Icarus – BK'; Rock in Rio 2022 – Ludmilla; Turnê Portas 2023 – Marisa Monte; Turnê Titãs Reencontro – Titãs
Voice of the Year	Brazil Category
**Ludmilla**; Gloria Groove; Iza; Liniker; Luísa Sonza; Marina Sena	**South: Isa Buzzi – "Direitos Autorais"**; Central-West: Banda Rock Beats – "Eu Só Quero Ficar Só"; Northeast: Joyce Alane (featuring João Gomes) – "Idiota Raiz"; North: Pedro Libe (featuring Hugo & Guilherme) – "O Copo Não Mente"; Southeast: Os Garotin – "Zero a Cem"; List of eliminated nominees Central-West: Goiás: Kamisa 10 – "Lance Livre"; Mato Grosso: Karola Nunes – "Botânica"; Mato Grosso do Sul: SoulRa (featuring Theo TWK) – "Trapnojo"; Northeast: Alagoas: Bruno Berle – "Quero Dizer"; Bahia: Josyara (featuring Juliana Linhares) – "Não Tem Lua"; Ceará: Mateus Fazeno Rock (featuring Mumutante) – "Pode Ser Easy"; Maranhão: Luna Falcão – "Silêncio"; Paraíba: Bixarte (featuring Urias) – "Pitbull Sem Coleira"; Piauí: Getúlio Abelha – "Voguebike"; Rio Grande do Norte: Tanda Macêdo – "Nossa Rotina"; Sergipe: Tori (featuring Bruno Berle) – "Descesse"; North: Acre: Brunno Damasceno – "Consciência de Classe"; Amapá: Ariel Moura – "Língua Intrusa"; Amazonas: Karen Francis – "Cardume"; Pará: Luê – "Preamar"; Rondônia: Gabriê – "Magia Leonina"; Roraima: Marília Tavares – "Me Dói Imaginar"; Southeast: Espírito Santo: Dudu (featuring MC Menor e Kailê) – "Mensagem"; Minas Gerais: Rayane & Rafaela (featuring Henrique & Juliano) – "Ali Te Ama"; São Paulo: Kaique & Felipe (featuring Luan Santana) – "Minha Pessoa"; South: Paraná: Vicka – "Romântica Demais"; Rio Grande do Sul: Cristal – "Kawo"

=== Professional categories ===
The winners of the following categories were chosen by the Multishow Awards Academy.

New Artist	Instrumentalist of the Year
**Melly**; Carol Biazin; Kay Black; Nadson o Ferinha; Thiago Pantaleão; Veigh	**Pretinho da Serrinha**; Douglas Moda; Iuri Rio Branco; Mu540; Nave; Papatinho
DJ of the Year	Music Production of the Year
**Alok**; Dennis; Mu540; Pedro Sampaio; Vhoor; Vintage Culture	**Pretinho da Serrinha**; Douglas Moda; Iuri Rio Branco; Mu540; Nave; Papatinho
Brega/Arrocha of the Year	Christian of the Year
**"Sinal" – Nadson o Ferinha and João Gomes**; "Anota Aí (Ao Vivo)" – Ávine Vinny and Nattan; "Cadê Seu Namorado Moça?" – Thales Lessa and Nadson o Ferinha; "Duas (Versão Arrocha)" – Dilsinho, Nadson o Ferinha and Rafinha RSQ; "Love Gostosinho" – Nattan and Felipe Amorim; "Toca o Trompete" – Felipe Amorim	**"Deus Cuida de Mim" – Kleber Lucas and Caetano Veloso**; "Deixa" – Maria Marçal; "Deserto (Ao Vivo)" – Maria Marçal; "Me Atraiu" – Gabriela Rocha; "Ninguém Explica Deus" – Clovis and Ton Carfi; "Todavia Me Alegrarei (Ao Vivo)" – Sarah Beatriz
Hip Hop of the Year	MPB of the Year
**"Penumbra" – Djonga, Sarah Guedes and Rapaz do Dread**; "Ballena" – Vulgo FK, MC PH, Veigh and Pedro Lotto; "Conexões de Máfia" – Matuê and Rich the Kid; "Coração de Gelo" – Wiu; "Melhor Só" – Kayblack, Baco Exu do Blues and Marquinho no Beat; "Novo Balanço" – Veigh, Bvga Beatz and Prod Malax	**"No Tempo da Intolerância" – Elza Soares**; "Bateu" – Gilsons, Rachel Reis and Mulu; "Céu Rosé" – Gilsons and Lagum; "Chico" – Luísa Sonza; "Grão de Areia" – Rubel and Xande de Pilares; "Vem Doce" – Vanessa da Mata
Pop of the Year	Axé/Pagodão of the Year
**"Fé nas Maluca" – Iza and MC Carol**; "Ameianoite" – Pabllo Vittar and Gloria Groove; "Me Lambe" – Jão; "Pilantra" – Jão and Anitta; "Sintomas de Prazer" – Ludmilla; "Tudo Pra Amar Você" – Marina Sena	**"Zona de Perigo" – Leo Santana**; "Cria da Ivete (Ao Vivo)" – Ivete Sangalo; "Dejavú" – Àttooxxá (featuring Liniker); "Pitbull Enraivado" – Oh Polêmico; "Posturado e Calmo" – Leo Santana; "Soca Fofo" – A Dama
Forró/Piseiro of the Year	Funk of the Year
**"Pequena Flor" – João Gomes**; "Chorei na Vaquejada" – Eric Land and Tarcísio do Accordion; "Pega o Guanabara (Ao Vivo)" – Wesley Safadão and Alanzim Coreano; "Coladin (Minha Deusa)" – Zé Vaqueiro; "Pra Que Fui Me Apaixonar" – João Gomes and Iguinho & Lulinha; "Prejudicado" – João Gomes	**"Tá OK" – Dennis and Kevin o Chris**; "Faz um Vuk Vuk (Teto Espelhado)" – Kevin o Chris; "Funk Rave" – Anitta; "Namora Aí" – MC Ryan SP, MC Daniel and Kotim; "Novidade na Área" – MC Livinho and DJ Matt D; "Vai Novinha Ah, Ah, Ah" – DJ Dyamante
Rock of the Year	Samba/Pagode of the Year
**"Distopia" – Planet Hemp and Criolo**; "Aos Poucos" – Supercombo; "Electric Fish" – Ana Frango Elétrico; "Segredo" – Sophia, Chablau and Uma Enorme Perda de Tempo; "Taca Fogo" – Planet Hemp; "Você Vai Lembrar de Mim" – NX Zero	**"Muito Romântico" – Xande de Pilares**; "Diferentão (Ao Vivo)" – Dilsinho; "Insônia" – Ludmilla and Marília Mendonça; "Interessante" – Ferrugem; "Lapada Dela (Ao Vivo)" – Menos é Mais and Matheus Fernandes; "Me Perdoa" – Ferrugem and Iza
Sertanejo of the Year	Cover Art of the Year
**"Erro Gostoso (Ao Vivo)" – Simone Mendes**; Dói" – Jorge & Mateus; "Narcisista (Ao Vivo)" – Maiara & Maraisa; "Nosso Quadro" – Ana Castela; "Oi Balde (Ao Vivo)" – Zé Neto & Cristiano; "Solteiro Forçado (Boiadeira Internacional)" – Ana Castela	**Afrodhit – Iza**; Escândalo Íntimo – Luísa Sonza; Icarus – BK'; O Dono do Lugar – Djonga; Super – Jão; Vício Inerente – Marina Sena
Album of the Year
**Xande Canta Caetano – Xande de Pilares**; Afrodhit – Iza; Escândalo Íntimo – Luísa Sonza; Icarus – BK'; No Tempo da Intolerância – Elza Soares; Super – Jão

== Multiple nominations and awards ==
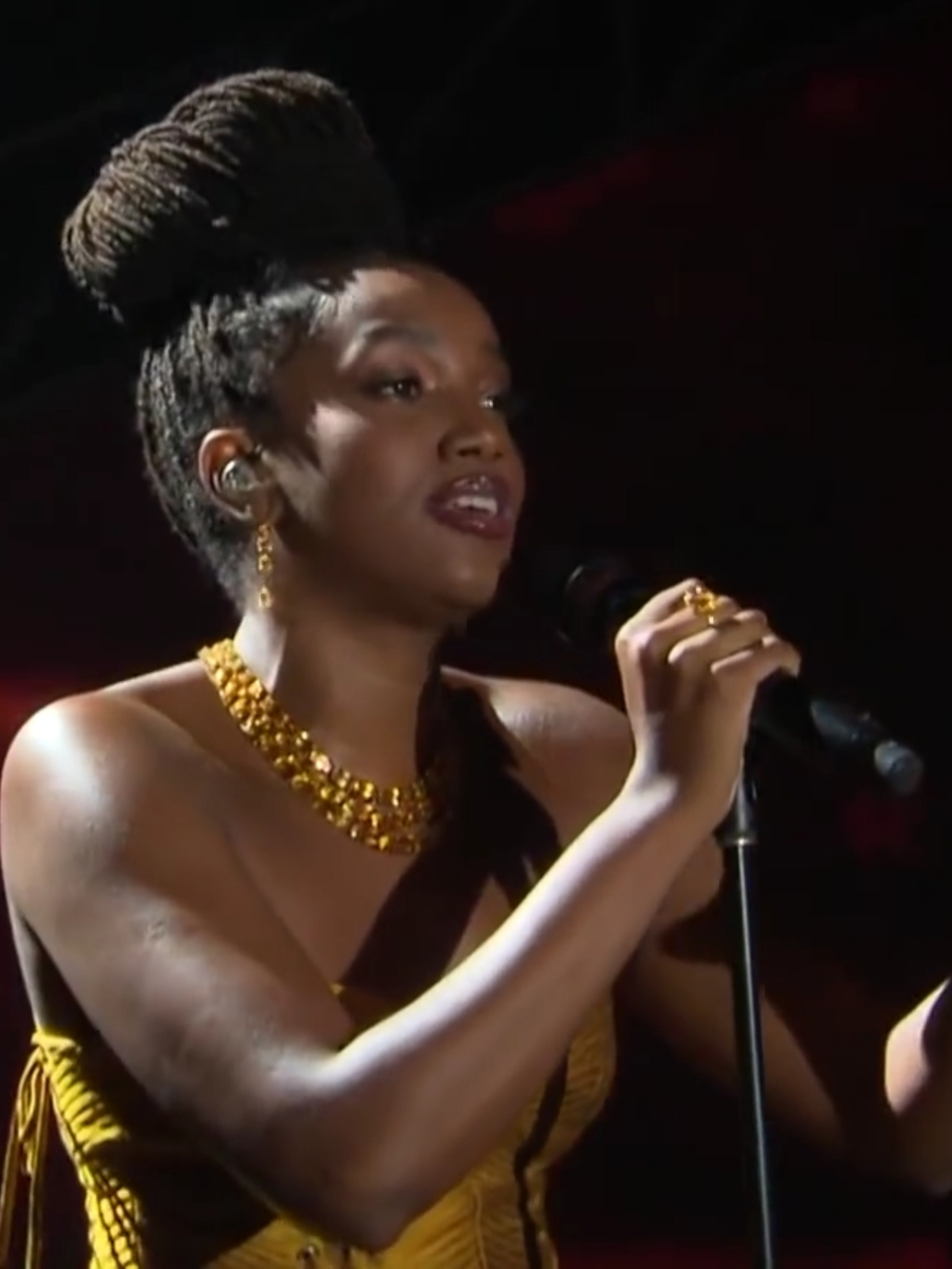
Three-time winner Iza as most nominations and awards

The following received multiple nominations: Seven:

- Iza
- Luísa Sonza

Six:

- Jão
- Ludmilla

Five:

- Anitta

Four:

- Ana Castela
- Dennis
- Kevin o Chris
- Leo Santana

Three:

- Marina Sena
