= Multishow Brazilian Music Award for Forró/Piseiro of the Year =

Brazilian music award for forró and piseiro songs

- Awarded for: Forró and piseiro songs
- Country: Brazil
- Presented by: Multishow
- First award: 2023
- Currently held by: "Beija Flor" – João Gomes, Mestrinho and Jota.pê (2025)

Highlights
- Most nominations: João Gomes (4)
- Website: Official website

The Multishow Brazilian Music Award for Forró/Piseiro of the Year is an award presented at the Multishow Brazilian Music Awards, to artists for forró and piseiro songs. The award was first presented to João Gomes for the song "Pequena Flor" in 2023. Gomes holds the record for most nominations, with four.

== History ==
For the 2023 ceremony, the Multishow Awards Academy announced several changes and introduction of new categories. The Academy has expanded to more than 900 members, composed by members of the music industry, with diversity in gender, race, color, musical genres, and region. Additionally, new categories were introduced to recognize artists and musical genres. One of these categories is Forró/Piseiro of the Year, to recognize forró and piseiro genres.

== Recipients ==
=== 2020s ===
Recipients
Year	Winner(s)	Nominees	Ref.
2023	João Gomes – "Pequena Flor"	Eric Land and Tarcísio do Acordeon – "Chorei na Vaquejada"; Wesley Safadão and Alanzim Coreano – "Pega o Guanabara (Ao Vivo)"; Zé Vaqueiro – "Coladin (Minha Deusa)"; João Gomes and Iguinho & Lulinha – "Pra Que Fui Me Apaixonar"; João Gomes – "Prejudicado"	
2024	Thullio Milionário – "Casca de Bala"	Nattan – "Amor na Praia"; Seu Desejo – "Beijo, Blues e Poesia"; João Gomes – "Coração de Vaqueiro"; Zé Vaqueiro – "Maravilhosa"; Mari Fernandez – "Página de Ex"	
2025	João Gomes, Mestrinho and Jota.pê – "Lembrei de Nós"	João Gomes, Mestrinho and Jota.pê – "Beija Flor"; Léo Foguete – "Cópia Proibida"; Vitinho Imperador – "Eu Me Apaixonei"; Talita Mel and Xand Avião – "Melzinho"; Raí Saia Rodada – "Tudo Vai Dar Certo"	

== Artists with multiple nominations ==
4 nominations

- João Gomes

2 nominations

- Zé Vaqueiro
