= Léo Foguete =

Brazilian singer and songwriter (born 2004)

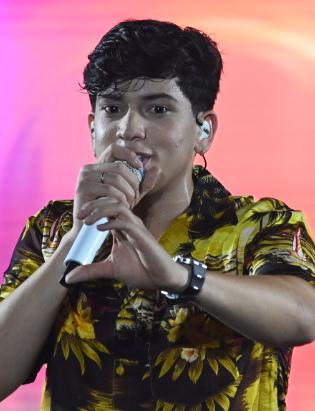
- Foguete in 2025

Background information
- Born: Mayrllon de Castro Souza; 25 February 2004 (age 22); Petrolina, Pernambuco, Brazil
- Genres: Forró; piseiro; electronic forró
- Occupations: Singer, songwriter
- Instrument: Vocals
- Years active: 2024-present
- Label: Acertei Produções

Mayrllon de Castro Souza (born 25 February 2004), better known by his stage name Léo Foguete (Brazilian Portuguese: [oɾuˈɐ̃]), is a Brazilian singer and songwriter. He rose to prominence in 2024 for the song "Última Noite", which he released with Nattan, a song that occupied the Top 10 of Spotify Brazil, and for the debut album Obrigado Deus, which reached the first place on the most listened to list also on Spotify Brazil. According to the Artistas 25 list, he was the ninth most popular artist in Brazil in April 2025.

== Early life ==
Foguete was born in Petrolina, Pernambuco, on 25 February 2004. He won his first guitar at the age of six after being seen playing with one from his uncle. As a teenager, he worked as a doorman, a delivery man for an app and a performer in small bars at night. He also worked in construction and in a mechanic's workshop with his father.

== Career ==
Foguete composed the song "Mais Uma Noite", recorded by singer João Gomes. With the recognition, he signed a contract with Acertei Produções. In 2024, Sua Música Digital released the song "Última Noite", a partnership between Léo Foguete and Nattan, which reached the top of the charts on digital platforms. In the same year, he released his debut studio album Obrigado Deus, which reached the top 1 on Spotify in Brazil.

In April 2020, Foguete participated in Hugo Henrique's song, "Terminou Pra Que", released on Hugo's DVD Sonho Ao Vivo.

== Discography ==
=== Studio albums ===
List of studio albums, with selected details
Title	Details
Obrigado Deus	Released: 26 October 2024; Label: Acertei Produções; Formats: Digital download

=== Singles ===
==== As lead artist ====
Year	Title
2024	"Atende o Telefone" (with Kaká & Pedrinho)
2024	"Última Noite (solo)"
2024	"Inconfiável"
2024	"Cópia Proibida"
2024	"A Distância Tá Maltratando" (with Kaká & Pedrinho)
2024	"Cabelo de Sol" (with Kaká & Pedrinho)
2025	"Quem de Nós Dois"
2025	"É Hit" (with Felipe Amorim)

==== As featured artist ====
Year	Title
2024	"Última Noite" (Nattan ft. Léo Foguete)
2024	"Um Palmo" (Luan Pereira ft. Léo Foguete)
2024	"Sem Você" (Ana Castela ft. Léo Foguete)
2024	"Obrigado, Deus" (Léo Foguete and vários artistas)
2025	"Qualidade de Vida" (Zé Vaqueiro ft. Léo Foguete)
2025	"Eu Vou Te Deixar Ir" (Manu Bahtidão ft. Léo Foguete)
2025	"À Moda Antiga" (Breno Ferreira ft. Léo Foguete and Alexandre Pires)
