= Multishow Brazilian Music Award for Artist of the Year =

Brazilian music industry award

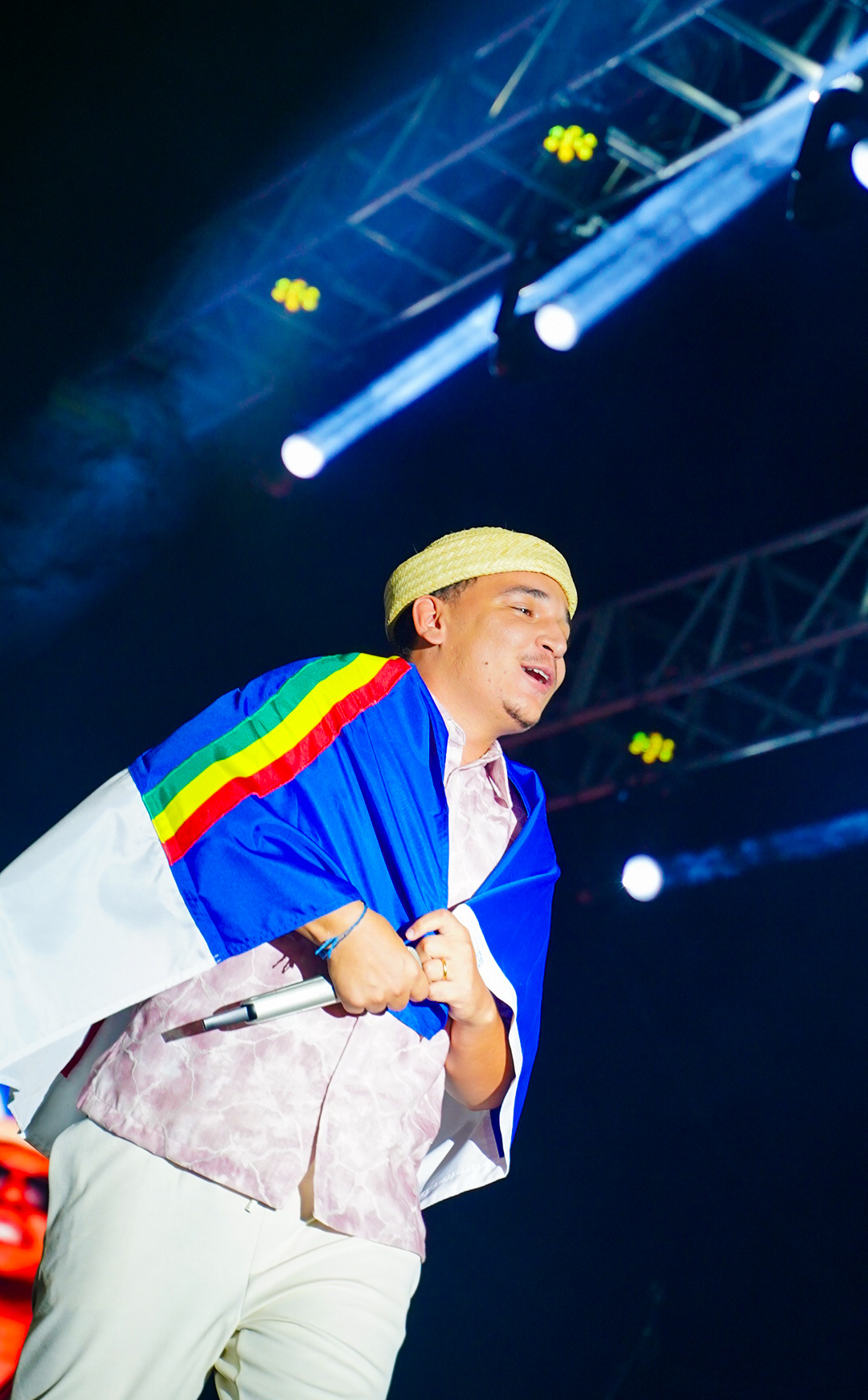
- João Gomes is the most recent recipient
- Country: Brazil
- Presented by: Multishow
- First award: 2022
- Most recent winner: João Gomes (2025)

Highlights
- Most nominations: Anitta and Jão (4 each)
- Website: Official website

The Multishow Brazilian Music Award for Artist of the Year is an award given at the annual Multishow Brazilian Music Awards. The category was first presented in the 2022 Multishow Brazilian Music Awards, replacing both the awards Female Singer of the Year and Male Singer of the Year. Anitta and Jão are the most nominated artists with four nominations each.

== Recipients ==
=== 2020s ===
Recipients
Year	Winner(s)	Nominees	Ref.
2022	Anitta	Gloria Groove; Gusttavo Lima; Jão; João Gomes; L7nnon; Ludmilla; Luísa Sonza	
2023	Iza	Ana Castela; Anitta; Jão; Ludmilla; Luísa Sonza	
2024	Liniker	Ana Castela; Anitta; Gloria Groove; Jão; Matuê	
2025	João Gomes	Ana Castela; Gaby Amarantos; Gilberto Gil; Liniker; Menos é Mais	
2026	TBA	Anitta; Jão; João Gomes; Marina Sena; Panda; Pedro Sampaio	

== Artists with multiple nominations ==
4 nominations

- Anitta
- Jão

3 nominations

- Ana Castela

2 nominations

- Gloria Groove
- João Gomes
- Liniker
- Ludmilla
- Luísa Sonza
