= List of Hot 100 number-one singles of 2024 (Brazil) =

The Brasil Hot 100 is a record chart that ranks the best-performing songs in Brazil. Its data is compiled by Luminate and published by music magazines Billboard Brasil and Billboard. The chart is based on each song's weekly audio and video streams on online digital music platforms.

== Chart history ==
No.	Issue date (Note: The issue date is not from Billboard Brasil, but from the American Billboard.)	Song	Artist(s)	Ref.
7	January 6	"Me Leva pra Casa / Escrito nas Estrelas / Saudade"	Lauana Prado	
8	January 13	"Deja Vu"	Luan Santana and Ana Castela	
re	January 20	"Me Leva pra Casa / Escrito nas Estrelas / Saudade"	Lauana Prado	
re	January 27	"Deja Vu"	Luan Santana and Ana Castela	
re	February 3	"Me Leva pra Casa / Escrito nas Estrelas / Saudade"	Lauana Prado	
re	February 10	"Me Leva pra Casa / Escrito nas Estrelas / Saudade"	Lauana Prado	
re	February 17	"Me Leva pra Casa / Escrito nas Estrelas / Saudade"	Lauana Prado	
9	February 24	"Macetando"	Ivete Sangalo and Ludmilla	
10	March 2	"Perna Bamba"	Parangolé and Leo Santana	
11	March 9	"MTG Baby Eu Tava na Rua da Água"	TR and MC Menor RV	
re	March 16	"Me Leva pra Casa / Escrito nas Estrelas / Saudade"	Lauana Prado	
12	March 23	"Qual é o Seu Desejo?"	Tz da Coronel featuring Ryu the Runner	
12	March 30	"Qual é o Seu Desejo?"	Tz da Coronel featuring Ryu the Runner	
13	April 6	"Diz Aí Qual é o Plano?"	MC IG, MC Luki, MC GP, MC Ryan SP, MC PH, MC Poze do Rodo, TrapLaudo, Oruam, MC GH do 7 and MC Nego Micha	
14	April 13	"Haverá Sinais"	Jorge & Mateus and Lauana Prado	
15	April 20	"MTG Quero Te Encontrar"	DJ JZ, Humberto & Ronaldo, MC Mininin and Silvanno Salles	
15	April 27	"MTG Quero Te Encontrar"	DJ JZ, Humberto & Ronaldo, MC Mininin and Silvanno Salles	
16	May 4	"Gosta de Rua"	Felipe & Rodrigo	
17	May 11	"Digitando"	Gustavo Moura & Rafael	
17	May 18	"Digitando"	Gustavo Moura & Rafael	
17	May 25	"Digitando"	Gustavo Moura & Rafael	
17	June 1	"Digitando"	Gustavo Moura & Rafael	
18	June 8	"MTG Quem Não Quer Sou Eu"	DJ Topo	
18	June 15	"MTG Quem Não Quer Sou Eu"	DJ Topo	
18	June 22	"MTG Quem Não Quer Sou Eu"	DJ Topo	
18	June 29	"MTG Quem Não Quer Sou Eu"	DJ Topo	
re	July 6	"Gosta de Rua"	Felipe & Rodrigo	
re	July 13	"Gosta de Rua"	Felipe & Rodrigo	
re	July 20	"Gosta de Rua"	Felipe & Rodrigo	
19	July 27	"The Box Medley Funk 2"	The Box, MC Brinquedo, MC Cebezinho, MC Tuto and MC Laranjinha	
19	August 3	"The Box Medley Funk 2"	The Box, MC Brinquedo, MC Cebezinho, MC Tuto and MC Laranjinha	
19	August 10	"The Box Medley Funk 2"	The Box, MC Brinquedo, MC Cebezinho, MC Tuto and MC Laranjinha	
19	August 17	"The Box Medley Funk 2"	The Box, MC Brinquedo, MC Cebezinho, MC Tuto and MC Laranjinha	
20	August 24	"Só Fé"	Grelo	
20	August 31	"Só Fé"	Grelo	
21	September 7	"Louco, Louco"	Mari Fernandez and Zé Felipe	
22	September 14	"Xonei"	Jorge & Mateus and Henrique & Juliano	
23	September 21	"Saveiro"	Kaique & Felipe and Luan Pereira	
24	September 28	"Crack com Mussilon"	Matuê	
24	October 5	"Crack com Mussilon"	Matuê	
25	October 12	"Coração Partido (Corazón Partío)"	Grupo Menos é Mais	
25	October 19	"Coração Partido (Corazón Partío)"	Grupo Menos é Mais	
26	October 26	"Última Saudade"	Henrique & Juliano	
26	November 2	"Última Saudade"	Henrique & Juliano	
27	November 9	"Barbie"	DJ Glenner and MC Tuto	
27	November 16	"Barbie"	DJ Glenner and MC Tuto	
27	November 23	"Barbie"	DJ Glenner and MC Tuto	
27	November 30	"Barbie"	DJ Glenner and MC Tuto	
27	December 7	"Barbie"	DJ Glenner and MC Tuto	
27	December 14	"Barbie"	DJ Glenner and MC Tuto	
28	December 21	"Última Noite"	Léo Foguete	
28	December 28	"Última Noite"	Léo Foguete	

== Number-one artists ==
List of number-one artists by total weeks at number one
Artist	Weeks at No. 1
MC Tuto	10
Lauana Prado	7
DJ Glenner	6
Gustavo Moura & Rafael	4
DJ Topo	4
Felipe & Rodrigo	4
The Box	4
MC Brinquedo	4
MC Cebezinho	4
MC Laranjinha	4
Henrique & Juliano	3
Luan Santana	2
Ana Castela	2
Tz da Coronel	2
Ryu the Runner	2
DJ JZ	2
Humberto & Ronaldo	2
MC Mininin	2
Silvanno Salles	2
Grelo	2
Jorge & Mateus	2
Matuê	2
Grupo Menos é Mais	2
Léo Foguete	2
Ivete Sangalo	1
Ludmilla	1
Parangolé	1
Leo Santana	1
TR	1
MC Menor RV	1
MC IG	1
MC Luki	1
MC GP	1
MC Ryan SP	1
MC PH	1
MC Poze do Rodo	1
TrapLaudo	1
Oruam	1
MC GH do 7	1
MC Nego Micha	1
Mari Fernandez	1
Zé Felipe	1
Kaique & Felipe	1
Luan Pereira	1
