= Manu Bahtidão =

Brazilian singer

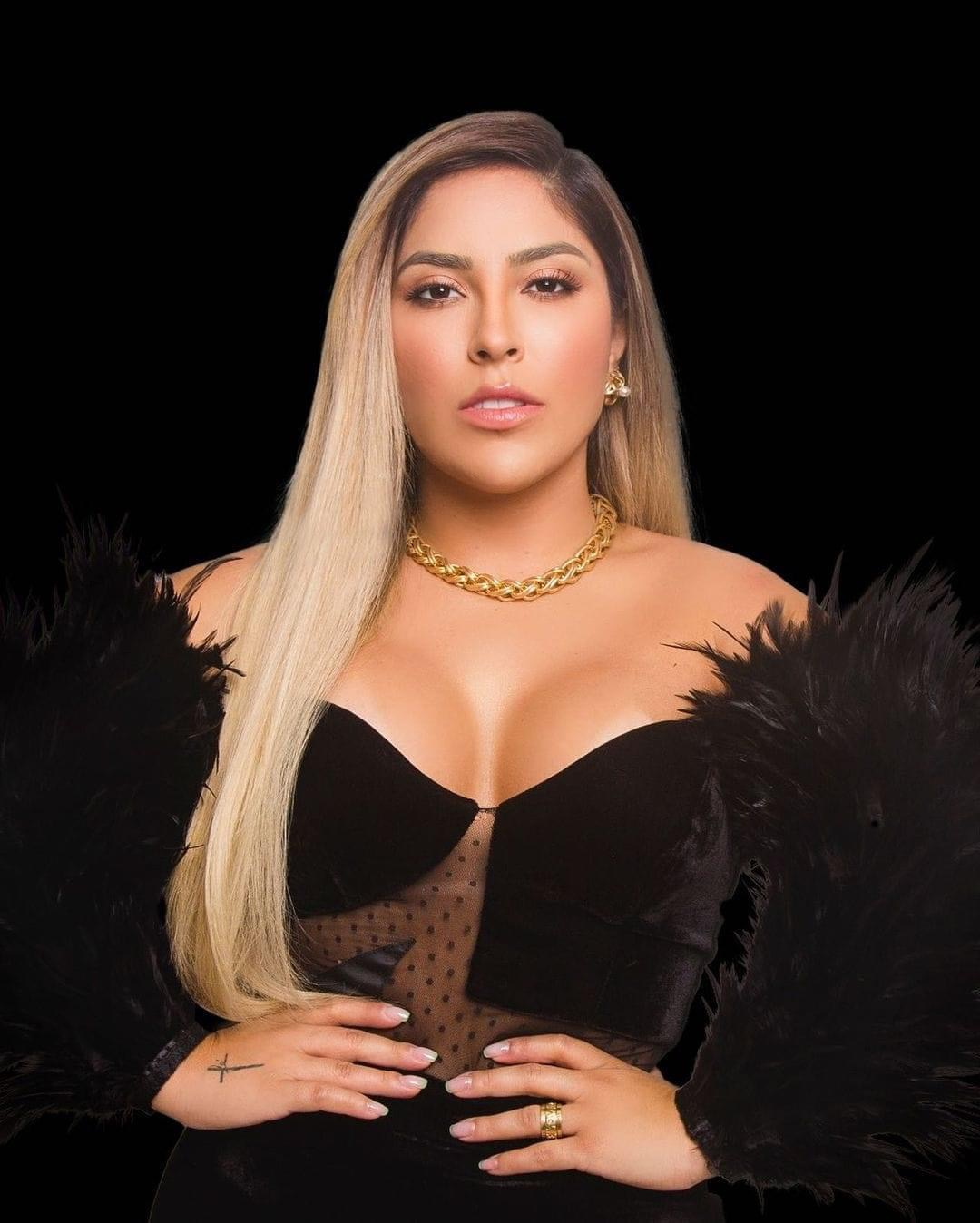

Background information
- Born: Emanuella Tenório Rocha; February 5, 1986 (age 39); Major Izidoro, Alagoas, Brazil
- Genres: Tecnomelody; Forró; Sertanejo
- Occupations: Singer; Songwriter
- Instrument: Vocals
- Years active: 2000–present
- Labels: ONErpm

Emanuella Tenório Rocha (born February 5, 1986, in Major Izidoro, Alagoas), better known by her stage name Manu Bahtidão, is a Brazilian singer and songwriter.

She rose to national prominence in 2023 with the hit single "Daqui Pra Sempre", a Brazilian version of "Tattoo" by Swedish singer Loreen, featuring Simone Mendes. The song reached number one on the Billboard Hot 100 Brazil and peaked at number four on Spotify Brazil.

Although born in Major Izidoro, in the Borborema Plateau region of Alagoas, she spent much of her life in Pará.

In 2007, she became the lead vocalist of Banda da Loirinha. In 2009, she briefly joined Companhia do Calypso, but left the same year to join Banda Batidão, where she gained popularity in Pará and became one of the leading names in Technomelody, gaining recognition throughout the North Region of Brazil.

In November 2023, Manu also debuted the song "Abismo" with Mari Fernandez, which entered the Billboard Hot 100 Brazil chart. Following the success of "Daqui Pra Sempre", she was invited to perform at the 2023 Multishow Brazilian Music Awards and on the morning show Encontro com Patrícia Poeta.

== Career ==
=== 2000–2015: Banda da Loirinha, Companhia do Calypso and Banda Batidão ===
Manu began her career in the early 2000s. In 2007, she joined Banda da Loirinha, where she remained for two years. In 2009, she became part of the lineup of Companhia do Calypso, but left within a year to join Banda Batidão, through which she gained recognition in the state of Pará.

=== 2015–present: Solo career ===
In 2015, Manu Bahtidão launched her solo career, releasing songs in the sertanejo genre. Her singles "Não Tem Essa Que Não Chora" and "0800" have accumulated over 25 million views on the video streaming platform YouTube.

She gained wider recognition following the release of the single "Daqui Pra Sempre", featuring Simone Mendes, and "Abismo", featuring Mari Fernandez.

== Discography ==
Live albums

- Século XXI (2019)
- Manu Bahtidão (2021)
- Máquina do Tempo (2023)
- Daqui pra Sempre (2024)
- 𝘋𝘦𝘴𝘵𝘪𝘯𝘰 (2025)

=== Singles ===
Song	Year	Chart positions			Certifications	Album
Song	Year	Billboard Hot 100 Brazil	Spotify Brazil Top 200	Top 100 Brasil	Certifications	Album
"Matemática do Amor"	2016	—	—	—		
"Sala de Espera"	2017	—	—	—		Feliz ou Infelizmente
"Não Tem Essa Que Não Chora" (feat. Simone Mendes)	2017	—	—	—		Século XXI
"Ai Coração" (feat. Rogério Ferrari)	2017	—	—	—		Século XXI
"Hora, Tempo e Espaço" (feat. Lucas Lucco)	2017	—	—	—		Século XXI
"Brilha Novinha" (feat. Naiara Azevedo)	2018	—	—	—		Século XXI
"0800" (feat. Jefferson Moares)	2018	—	—	—		Século XXI
"Palminha" (feat. Márcia Fellipe)	2018	—	—	—		Século XXI
"Quero Mais Que Cê Suma" (feat. Day e Lara)	2018	—	—	—		Século XXI
"Vontade de Ser Rico"	2018	—	—	—		Século XXI
"Stopzar"	2019	—	—	—		
"Sorry"	2019	—	—	—		
"Feliz ou Infelizmente"	2019	—	—	—		Século XXI
"Uma Mais Um"	2019	—	—	—		Século XXI
"Rapariga"	2020	—	—	—		
"Par Perfeito"	2020	—	—	—		
"O Meu Amor Não Volta" (feat. Rebeca Lindsay)	2020	—	—	—		
"Coração de Rapariga" (feat. Tierry)	2020	—	—	—		Manu Bahtidão
"Sapatinho do Bebê"	2021	—	—	—		Manu Bahtidão
"Tiro Certo"	2021	—	—	—		
"Eu Juro"	2021	—	—	—		
"Sem Ti"	2021	—	—	—		
"TBT"	2021	—	—	—		
"Máquina do Tempo"	2022	—	—	—		
"Garrafa de Gin"	2022	—	—	—		Máquina do Tempo
"Ih Fudeu"	2022	—	—	—		Máquina do Tempo
"Pense em Mim" (feat. Billy Brasil)	2022	—	—	—		
"Quem Perde É Quem Trai"	2023	—	—	—		
"Daqui Pra Sempre" (feat. Simone Mendes)	2023	1	2	1		Daqui Pra Sempre
"Abismo" (feat. Mari Fernandez)	2023	100	104	—		Daqui Pra Sempre
"Errar é Humano"	2024	—	—	—		Daqui Pra Sempre
"Torre Eiffel" (feat. Guilherme & Benuto)	2024	—	1	—		Daqui Pra Sempre
"Se Não For Tu" (feat. Melody)	2024	—	—	—		Daqui Pra Sempre
"60 M²" (feat. Xand Avião)	2024	—	—	—		Daqui Pra Sempre
"A Otária" (feat. Raphaela Santos)	2024	—	—	—		Daqui Pra Sempre
"4 Enganados"	2024	—	18	—		
"Universo" (feat. Matheus & Kauan)	2024	—	53	—		Destino
"Raivinha" (feat. Tony Salles)	2025	—	—	—		Destino
