= Multishow Brazilian Music Awards =

Annual award for achievements in Brazilian music

- Current: 2026 Multishow Brazilian Music Awards
- Logo since 2023
- Awarded for: Excellence in Brazilian music
- Country: Brazil
- Presented by: Multishow
- First award: 1994; 32 years ago
- Website: gshow.globo.com/multishow/premio-multishow/

Television/radio coverage
- Network: Multishow (1994–present); TV Globo (2023–present)

The Multishow Brazilian Music Awards (Brazilian Portuguese: Prêmio Multishow de Música Brasileira), or simply known as the Multishow Awards (Brazilian Portuguese: Prêmio Multishow), are awards presented by the Brazilian channel Multishow to recognize Brazilian music excellence. Originally called the TVZ Awards (Brazilian Portuguese: Prêmio TVZ), the first ceremony was held in 1994. It is considered one of the biggest music awards in Brazil.

== History ==
The first award ceremony was held as TVZ Awards in 1994 at JazzMania in Rio de Janeiro, with five categories presented. The nominees and winners were initially selected by telephone voting, with voting open exclusively to pay television subscribers. In 1998, the awards were renamed the Multishow Brazilian Music Awards. From 1999, the winners were selected via the internet. In 2011, a specialized jury composed of music critics was introduced. In 2019, the Multishow Brazilian Music Awards Academy (Portuguese: Academia Prêmio Multishow de Música Brasileira) was formally established. In 2023, the ceremony was broadcast on TV Globo for the first time.

=== TVZ Awards winners ===
The 1994 winners and nominees are unknown; until 1997, only the winners are known.

==== 1995 ====
- Best Male Singer: Lulu Santos
- Best Female Singer: Daniela Mercury
- Best Group: Skank
- New Artist: Banda Mel
- Best Music Video: "É Proibido Fumar" – Skank

==== 1996 ====
- Best National Male Singer: Renato Russo
- Best National Female Singer: Fernanda Abreu
- Best International Male Singer: George Michael
- Best International Female Singer: Madonna
- Best National Group: Os Paralamas do Sucesso
- Best International Group: The Rolling Stones
- National New Artist: Pato Fu
- International New Artist: Oasis
- Best National Music Video: "Na Rua, Na Chuva, Na Fazenda" – Kid Abelha
- Best International Music Video: "Scream" – Michael Jackson

==== 1997 ====
- Best National Male Singer: Carlinhos Brown
- Best National Female Singer: Daniela Mercury
- Best International Male Singer: Eric Clapton
- Best International Female Singer: Alanis Morissette
- Best National Group: Cidade Negra
- Best International Group: U2
- National New Artist: Os Virgulóides
- International New Artist: Spice Girls
- Best National Music Video: "É Uma Partida de Futebol" – Skank
- Best International Music Video: "Blood on the Dance Floor" – Michael Jackson

== Ceremonies ==
Year	Date	Venue	Host city	Host(s)	Ref.
1994	—N/a	JazzMania	Rio de Janeiro	Cissa Guimarães	
1995	—N/a	Ballroom	Rio de Janeiro	Mylena Ciribelli	
1996	18 September	Ballroom	Rio de Janeiro	Mylena Ciribelli	
1997	16 September	Ballroom	Rio de Janeiro	João Marcelo Bôscoli and Alessandra Calor	
1998	27 May	Canecão	Rio de Janeiro	Toni Garrido and Alessandra Calor	
1999	25 May	Canecão	Rio de Janeiro	João Marcelo Bôscoli and Alessandra Calor	
2000	16 May	Theatro Municipal	Rio de Janeiro	Nelson Motta and Fernanda Torres	
2001	22 May	Theatro Municipal	Rio de Janeiro	Nelson Motta and Fernanda Torres	
2002	4 June	Theatro Municipal	Rio de Janeiro	Nelson Motta and Fernanda Torres	
2003	3 June	Theatro Municipal	Rio de Janeiro	Nelson Motta and Fernanda Torres	
2004	1 June	Theatro Municipal	Rio de Janeiro	Nelson Motta and Regina Casé	
2005	5 July	Theatro Municipal	Rio de Janeiro	Nelson Motta and Regina Casé	
2006	16 May	Theatro Municipal	Rio de Janeiro	Fernanda Torres	
2007	3 July	Theatro Municipal	Rio de Janeiro	Fernanda Torres	
2008	1 July	Theatro Municipal	Rio de Janeiro	Lázaro Ramos	
2009	18 August	Citibank Hall	Rio de Janeiro	Fernanda Torres	
2010	24 August	HSBC Arena	Rio de Janeiro	Fernanda Torres and Bruno Mazzeo	
2011	6 September	HSBC Arena	Rio de Janeiro	Bruno Mazzeo	
2012	18 September	HSBC Arena	Rio de Janeiro	Ivete Sangalo and Paulo Gustavo	
2013	3 September	HSBC Arena	Rio de Janeiro	Ivete Sangalo and Paulo Gustavo	
2014	28 October	HSBC Arena	Rio de Janeiro	Ivete Sangalo, Paulo Gustavo, Tatá Werneck and Didi Wagner	
2015	1 September	HSBC Arena	Rio de Janeiro	Ivete Sangalo and Paulo Gustavo	
2016	25 October	Rio Arena	Rio de Janeiro	Fábio Porchat and Tata Werneck	
2017	24 October	Jeunesse Arena	Rio de Janeiro	Fábio Porchat and Tata Werneck	
2018	25 September	Jeunesse Arena	Rio de Janeiro	Tatá Werneck and Anitta	
2019	29 October	Jeunesse Arena	Rio de Janeiro	Anitta and Paulo Gustavo	
2020	11 November	Jeunesse Arena	Rio de Janeiro	Paulo Gustavo, Tata Werneck and Iza	
2021	8 December	Jeunesse Arena	Rio de Janeiro	Iza and Tatá Werneck	
2022	18 October	Jeunesse Arena	Rio de Janeiro	Marcos Mion, Gloria Groove and Linn da Quebrada	
2023	7 November	Jeunesse Arena	Rio de Janeiro	Tatá Werneck, Tadeu Schmidt and Ludmilla	
2024	3 December	Riocentro	Rio de Janeiro	Tatá Werneck, Tadeu Schmidt and Kenya Sade	
2025	9 December	Farmasi Arena	Rio de Janeiro	Tadeu Schmidt and Kenya Sade	
2026	9 December	Farmasi Arena	Rio de Janeiro	Tadeu Schmidt and Kenya Sade	

== Categories ==
=== Voted categories ===
Winners of the following categories are chosen by fan votes through a voting process.

- TVZ Music Video of the Year
- New Artist of the Year
- Hit of the Year
- Show of the Year
- Brazil Category

=== Professional categories ===
Winners of the following categories are chosen by members of the Multishow Awards Academy.

- Artist of the Year
- Album of the Year
- DJ of the Year
- Music Production of the Year
- Instrumentalist of the Year
- Cover Art of the Year
- Arrocha of the Year
- Axé/Pagodão of the Year
- Brega of the Year
- Forró/Piseiro of the Year
- Funk of the Year
- Gospel of the Year
- MPB of the Year
- Urban Song of the Year
- Pop of the Year
- Rock of the Year
- Samba/Pagode of the Year
- Sertanejo of the Year

=== Special awards ===
- Vanguard Award: Anitta (2024)
- Special Award of the Year
  - Gilberto Gil (2025)
  - Alceu Valença (2026)

=== Past award categories ===
- Song of the Year
- Voice of the Year
- Female Singer of the Year
- Male Singer of the Year
- Experimente
- Música Chiclete
- Best Web Cover
- Best DVD
- Best Music Video
- Best Sertanejo Artist
- Best International Male Singer
- Best International Female Singer
- Best International Video
- Best International Group
- Best National Group
- International Newcomer
- New Group

== Records ==
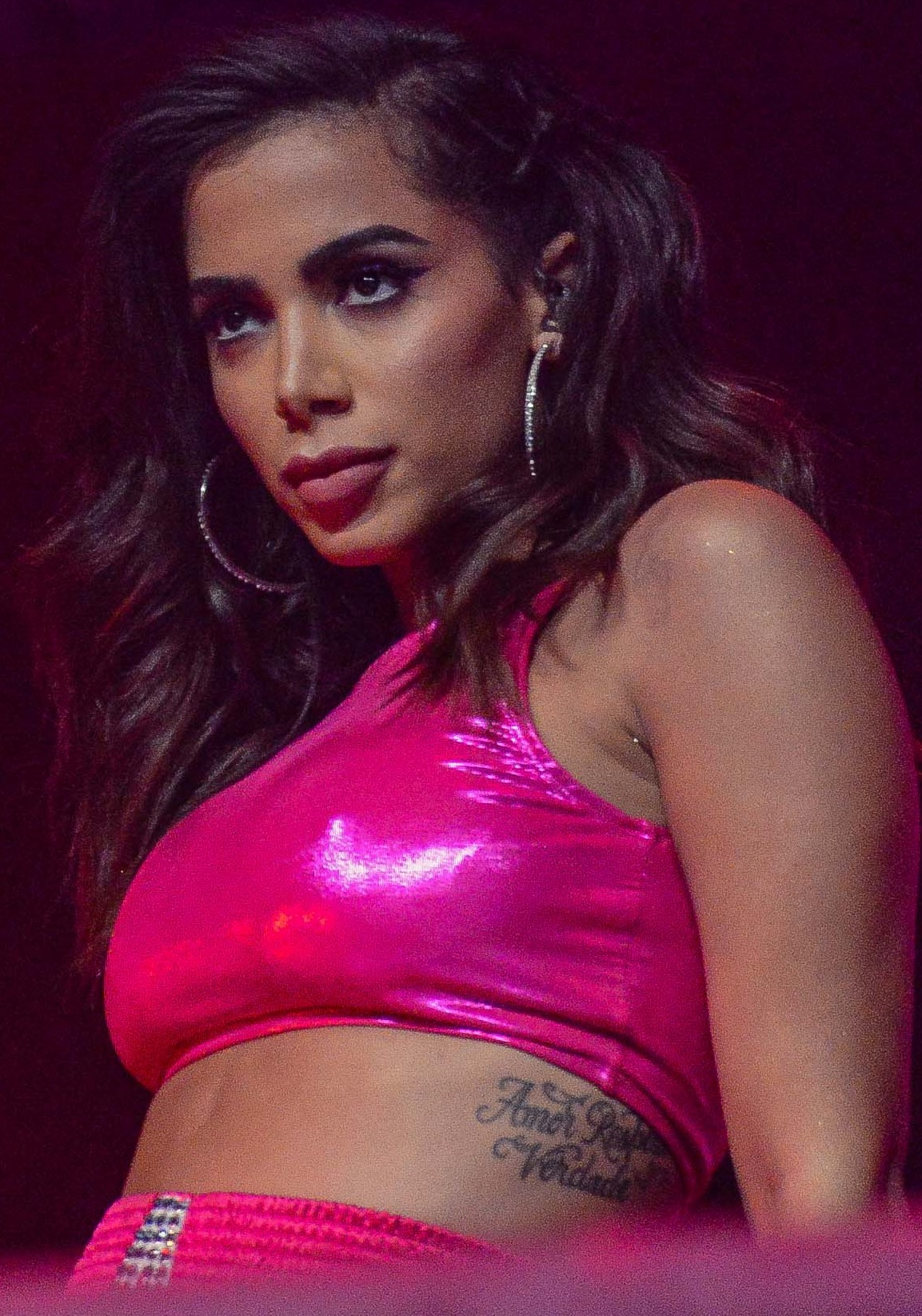
Anitta is the most awarded and nominated artist in the history of the Multishow Brazilian Music Award.

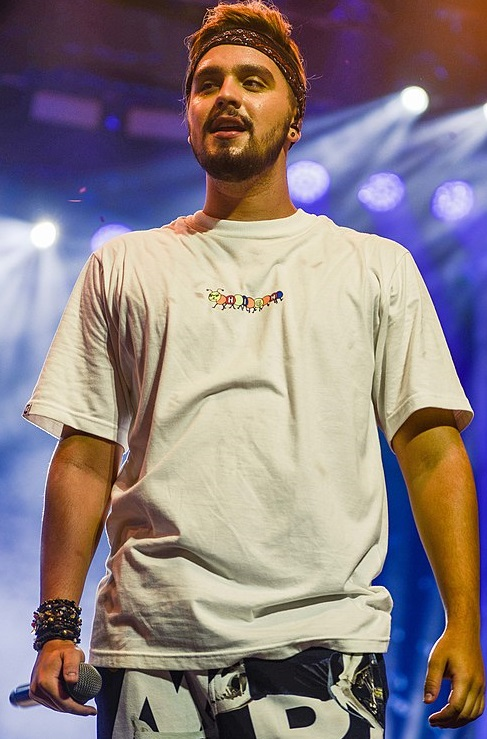
Luan Santana is the male artist with the highest number of awards and nominations.

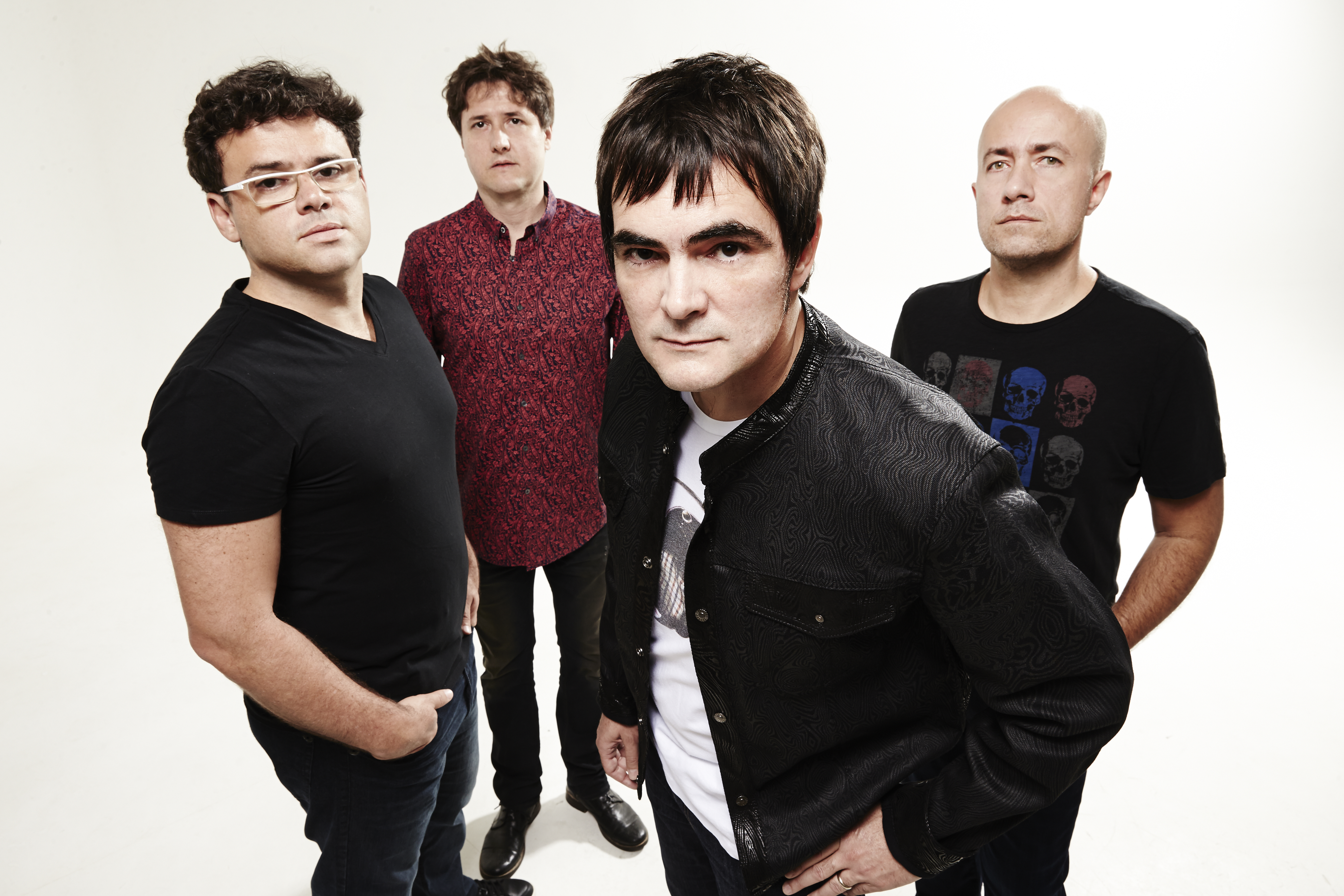
Skank holds the record as the band/group with the most awards won and nominations received.

Artist	Number of awards
Anitta	23
Ivete Sangalo	21
Luan Santana	12
Skank	8
Titãs	8
Pitty	7
Ludmilla	7
Paula Fernandes	6
João Gomes	6
NX Zero	6
Ana Carolina	6
Marisa Monte	6
Iza	5
Simone Mendes	5
Marília Mendonça	5
Caetano Veloso	5

Artist	Number of nominations
Anitta	62
Ivete Sangalo	58
Luan Santana	44
Skank	34
Ludmilla	29
Jota Quest	29
Marisa Monte	27
Pitty	26
Caetano Veloso	24
Ana Carolina	23
Luísa Sonza	23
Iza	21
Titãs	19
NX Zero	18
Liniker	18
Charlie Brown Jr.	18
Jão	17
Pabllo Vittar	17
Sandy & Junior	17
Gloria Groove	16
João Gomes	16
Paula Fernandes	15
Jorge & Mateus	15
Marcelo D2	15
Capital Inicial	15
O Rappa	15
Marília Mendonça	14
Gusttavo Lima	14
Thiaguinho	14
Marina Sena	14
Los Hermanos	14
Os Paralamas do Sucesso	14
Sorriso Maroto	14
Chico Buarque	13
Maria Rita	12
Ana Castela	12
BaianaSystem	12
Seu Jorge	12
Céu	11
Ferrugem	11
Vanessa da Mata	11
CPM 22	11
Zeca Pagodinho	11
Gilberto Gil	10
Simone Mendes	10
Pedro Sampaio	10
Menos é Mais	10
Leo Santana	10
Jota.pê	10
Dennis	10
Wesley Safadão	10
Sandy	10
