= List of airplay number-one singles of 2024 (Brazil) =

List of the most-played songs on Brazilian radio stations in 2024

The Top 100 Brasil is a record chart that ranks the most-played songs in Brazilian radio stations. Compiled and published by Crowley Broadcast Analysis, the chart is based on each song's weekly airplay.

== Chart history ==
| Issue date | Song | Artist(s) | Weekly audience | Ref. |
|---|---|---|---|---|
| January 1 | "Depois do Amor" | Gustavo Mioto | 2496 | |
| January 8 | "Amor Não dá em Copo" | Israel & Rodolffo featuring Hugo & Guilherme | 2576 | |
| January 15 | "Daqui pra Sempre" | Manu Bahtidão featuring Simone Mendes | 2545 | |
| January 22 | "Depois do Amor" | Gustavo Mioto | 2639 | |
| January 29 | "Morena" | Clayton & Romario | 2853 | |
| February 5 | "Morena" | Clayton & Romario | 2580 | |
| February 12 | "Morena" | Clayton & Romario | 2521 | |
| February 19 | "Morena" | Clayton & Romario | 2889 | |
| February 26 | "Relação Errada" | Gusttavo Lima featuring Bruno & Marrone | 3101 | |
| March 4 | "Relação Errada" | Gusttavo Lima featuring Bruno & Marrone | 3102 | |
| March 11 | "Corpo Sexy" | Guilherme & Benuto featuring Maiara & Maraisa | 3230 | |
| March 18 | "Relação Errada" | Gusttavo Lima featuring Bruno & Marrone | 3120 | |
| March 25 | "Relação Errada" | Gusttavo Lima featuring Bruno & Marrone | 3456 | |
| April 1 | "Relação Errada" | Gusttavo Lima featuring Bruno & Marrone | 3165 | |
| April 8 | "Relação Errada" | Gusttavo Lima featuring Bruno & Marrone | 3244 | |
| April 15 | "Relação Errada" | Gusttavo Lima featuring Bruno & Marrone | 3180 | |
| April 22 | "Relação Errada" | Gusttavo Lima featuring Bruno & Marrone | 3469 | |
| April 29 | "Relação Errada" | Gusttavo Lima featuring Bruno & Marrone | 3133 | |
| May 6 | "Relação Errada" | Gusttavo Lima featuring Bruno & Marrone | 3117 | |
| May 13 | "Amor Diferente" | Thiago & Samuel featuring Simone Mendes and Os Parazin | 3039 | |

== See also ==
- List of Hot 100 number-one singles of 2024 (Brazil)
