= IFPE =

IFPE may stand for:

- Instituto Federal de Educação, Ciência e Tecnologia de Pernambuco, a Brazilian institution of higher education in Pernambuco (originally called ETFPE-Escola Técnica Federal de Pernambuco), Brazil
- International Exposition for Power Transmission, a trade show
