= Ana Frango Elétrico =

Brazilian singer-songwriter (born 1997)

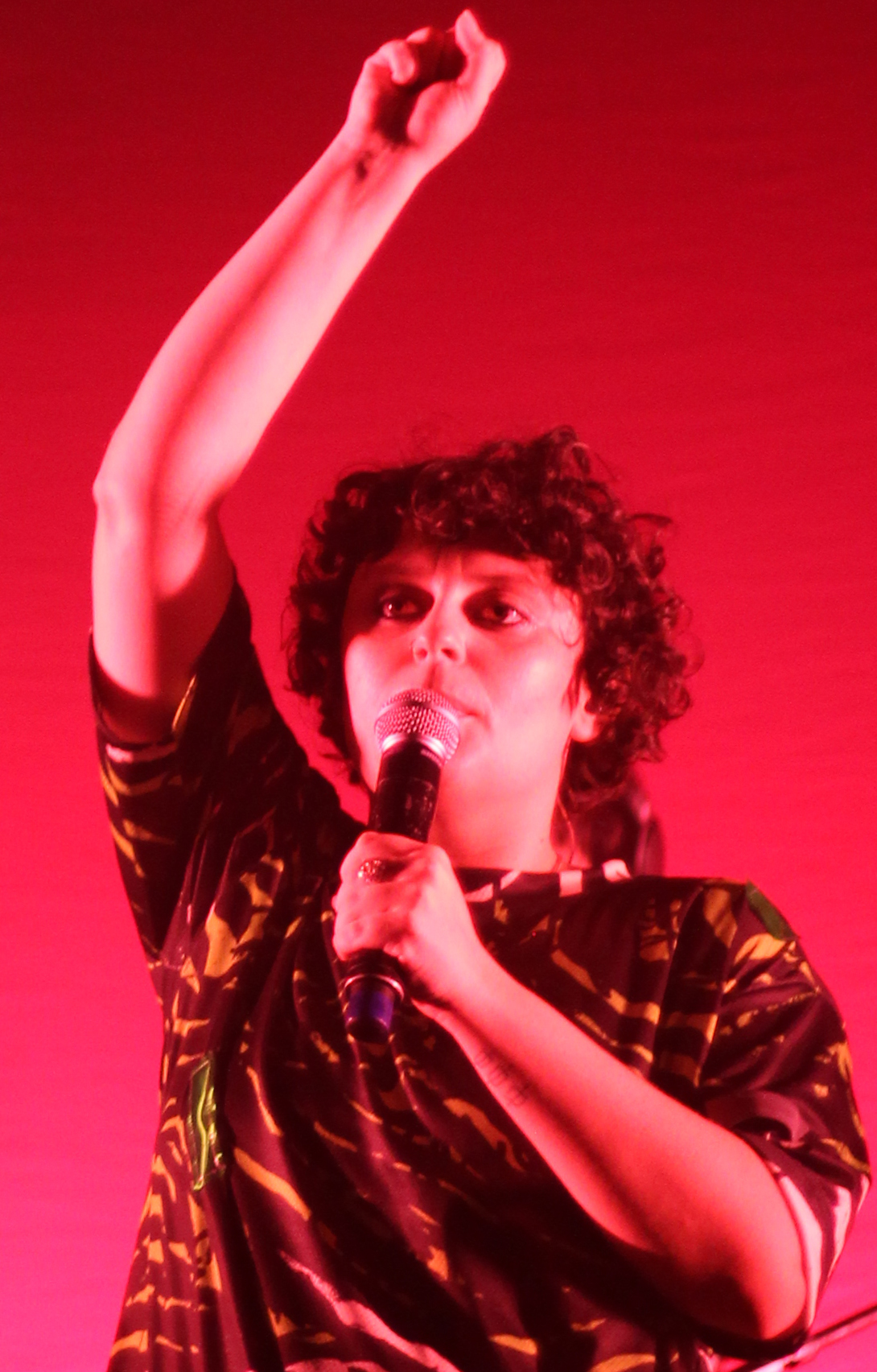
- Ana Frango Elétrico performing in 2024

Background information
- Born: Ana Faria Fainguelernt; 19 December 1997 (age 28); Rio de Janeiro, Brazil
- Occupations: Singer; songwriter; multi-instrumentalist; producer; poet; visual artist
- Instruments: Vocals; guitar; electric guitar; piano; keyboard
- Years active: 2016–present
- Labels: Mr Bongo; Risco; Think!

Ana Faria Fainguelernt (born 19 December 1997), better known by the stage name Ana Frango Elétrico (transl. Ana Electric Chicken), is a Brazilian singer-songwriter, multi-instrumentalist, producer, poet, and visual artist.

Based in Rio de Janeiro, they (Note: Fainguelernt is non-binary and uses they/them pronouns.) released their debut studio album Mormaço Queima in 2018. Their subsequent albums Little Electric Chicken Heart (2019) and Me Chama de Gato Que Eu Sou Sua (2023) were released to critical acclaim, with the former nominated for Best Portuguese Language Rock or Alternative Album at the 21st Annual Latin Grammy Awards.

== Early life ==
Ana Faria Fainguelernt was born in Rio de Janeiro, Brazil, on 19 December 1997. They acquired the nickname "Frango Elétrico" (Portuguese for "Electric Chicken") from their grandfather, whose schoolmates struggled to pronounce his Russian last name Fainguelernt.

By age 10, Fainguelernt studied guitar under the tutelage of Brazilian guitarist Aloysio Neves. As a teenager, they listened to many Brazilian musicians associated with bossa nova and the Tropicália movement, including Jorge Ben Jor, Caetano Veloso, Itamar Assumpção, and Novos Baianos, later remarking, "I love jazz because I’m Brazilian." In high school, Fainguelernt and their classmates formed a band called Almoço Nu (the Brazilian Portuguese title of the novel Naked Lunch), performing music that blended rock and roll with maracatu and cumbia influences.

Fainguelernt was also influenced by the sounds of artists including Prince, Michael Jackson, and Everything but the Girl.

== Career ==
In 2016, Fainguelernt began recording their debut album Mormaço Queima, whose title loosely translates to "sunburn without sun, but from the sea wind". The album, produced alongside Thiago Nassif and released in 2018, is influenced by post-punk and has a loose sound, with instruments not held to a click track. An edited version of the album, remastered by Martin Scian, was released as a vinyl LP record in 2020.

Between 2018 and 2019, Fainguelernt recorded their sophomore album Little Electric Chicken Heart, which blends influences from chamber pop, art pop, indie rock, and MPB. It was released in 2019 to critical acclaim, garnering a nomination for Best Portuguese Language Rock or Alternative Album at the 21st Annual Latin Grammy Awards in 2020. When asked to describe the genres of their first two albums, Fainguelernt said, "Mormaço Queima, I’d normally say is 'bossa pop rock'. And Little Electric Chicken Heart is 'ballad-rock jazz'. But, really, it’s not jazz, it’s not bossa, it’s not rock – what the fuck is it? I don’t know! It just doesn’t need to be something!"

In 2021, Fainguelernt published a catalogue book of poetry, prints, and illustrations created between 2015 and 2019 titled Escoliose: paralelismo miúdo (transl. Scoliosis: minuscule parallelism). Fainguelernt described the collection as "part of a bigger search into my language: Portuguese words – and colours," also noting that three poems from the collection became lyrics to songs on Mormaço Queima and Little Electric Chicken Heart.

Fainguelernt has helmed the production for other artists' albums, including the 2021 self-titled debut album by Brazilian band Sophia Chablau e Uma Enorme Perda de Tempo, and the 2022 debut album Sim Sim Sim by Brazilian band Bala Desejo.

Fainguelernt's third studio album, Me Chama de Gato Que Eu Sou Sua, was released in 2023 in collaboration between British record label Mr Bongo, Fainguelernt's label Risco, and Japanese label Think! Records. Fainguelernt said regarding the album, "I started it in 2021 with the intention of showing, in means of sound, understanding and feelings about queer love, subjectively exposing myself." Drawing from various genres including bossa nova, funk, disco, boogie, lounge music, and city pop, it has been described by critics as "a hard-grooving time machine" and "a satisfying rummage in the racks of an exceptional record shop". It was chosen by the Associação Paulista de Críticos de Arte as one of the 50 best Brazilian albums of 2023.

== Personal life ==
Fainguelernt is pansexual, queer, and non-binary. They express their gender through music.

== Discography ==
=== Studio albums ===
- Mormaço Queima (2018)
- Little Electric Chicken Heart (2019)
- Me Chama de Gato Que Eu Sou Sua (2023)

== Awards and nominations ==
Award	Year	Category	Nominated work	Result	Ref.
Associação Paulista de Críticos de Arte	2019	Musical Revelation	Ana Frango Elétrico	Won	
Multishow Brazilian Music Awards	2020	Album of the Year	Electric Chicken Heart	Nominated	
Multishow Brazilian Music Awards	2020	New Artist of the Year	Ana Frango Elétrico	Nominated	
Multishow Brazilian Music Awards	2023	Rock of the Year	"Electric Fish"	Nominated	
Latin Grammy Awards	2020	Best Portuguese Language Rock or Alternative Album	Little Electric Chicken Heart	Nominated	
Latin Grammy Awards	2024	Best Portuguese Language Rock or Alternative Album	Me Chama de Gato Que Eu Sou Sua	Nominated	
Women's Music Event	2020	Best Music Producer	Ana Frango Elétrico	Nominated	
Women's Music Event	2023	Best Music Producer	Ana Frango Elétrico	Won	
Women's Music Event	2023	Alternative Music	"Electric Fish"	Nominated	
