= Melly (Brazilian singer) =

Brazilian Singer/Songwriter

- Born: Salvador, Bahia, Brazil
- Occupations: Singer; songwriter
- Years active: 2018–present
- Awards: Multishow Award (2023)

Melly is a Brazilian singer and songwriter born in Salvador, Bahia. She gained national recognition by winning the Multishow Award in the "Revelation of the Year" category in 2023. In 2024, her debut album Amaríssima was nominated for the Latin Grammy Award for Best Contemporary Portuguese Language Pop Album.

== Career ==
Melly started singing and playing piano as a child, encouraged by her father, musician Tito Araújo. At 16, she was already performing in bars in Salvador. In 2021, she released her first EP, Azul, which caught critics' attention for its blend of R&B with Afro-Bahian rhythms.

In 2023, she was elected "Revelation of the Year" at the Multishow Awards. In 2024, she released her first studio album, Amaríssima, which earned her a Latin Grammy nomination. In 2025, she was nominated for the Multishow Award in the "Pop of the Year" category with the song "Despacha". That same year, she was also nominated for the Brazilian Music Award in the "Pop Artist of the Year" category.

In 2026, she released the acoustic EP slap sessions via Som Livre, featuring reworkings of hits such as "Eternamente" (Gal Costa) and her own songs.

== Discography ==
=== Studio albums ===
- Amaríssima (2024)

=== EPs ===
- Azul (2021)
- slap sessions (2026)

=== Singles ===
- "Bandida" (with Karol Conká)
- "Despacha"
- "Papo de Edredom" (with Liniker)
- "10 Minutos" (with Liniker)
- "Cacau"
- "Eternamente"

== Awards and nominations ==
Year	Award	Category	Work	Result	Ref.
2023	Multishow Award	Revelation of the Year	Melly	Won	
2024	Multishow Award	MPB of the Year	"Cacau"	Nominated	
2024	Latin Grammy	Best Contemporary Portuguese Language Pop Album	Amaríssima	Nominated	
2025	Multishow Award	Pop of the Year	"Despacha"	Nominated	
2025	Brazilian Music Award	Pop Artist of the Year	Melly	Nominated	
