= Bruno Berle =

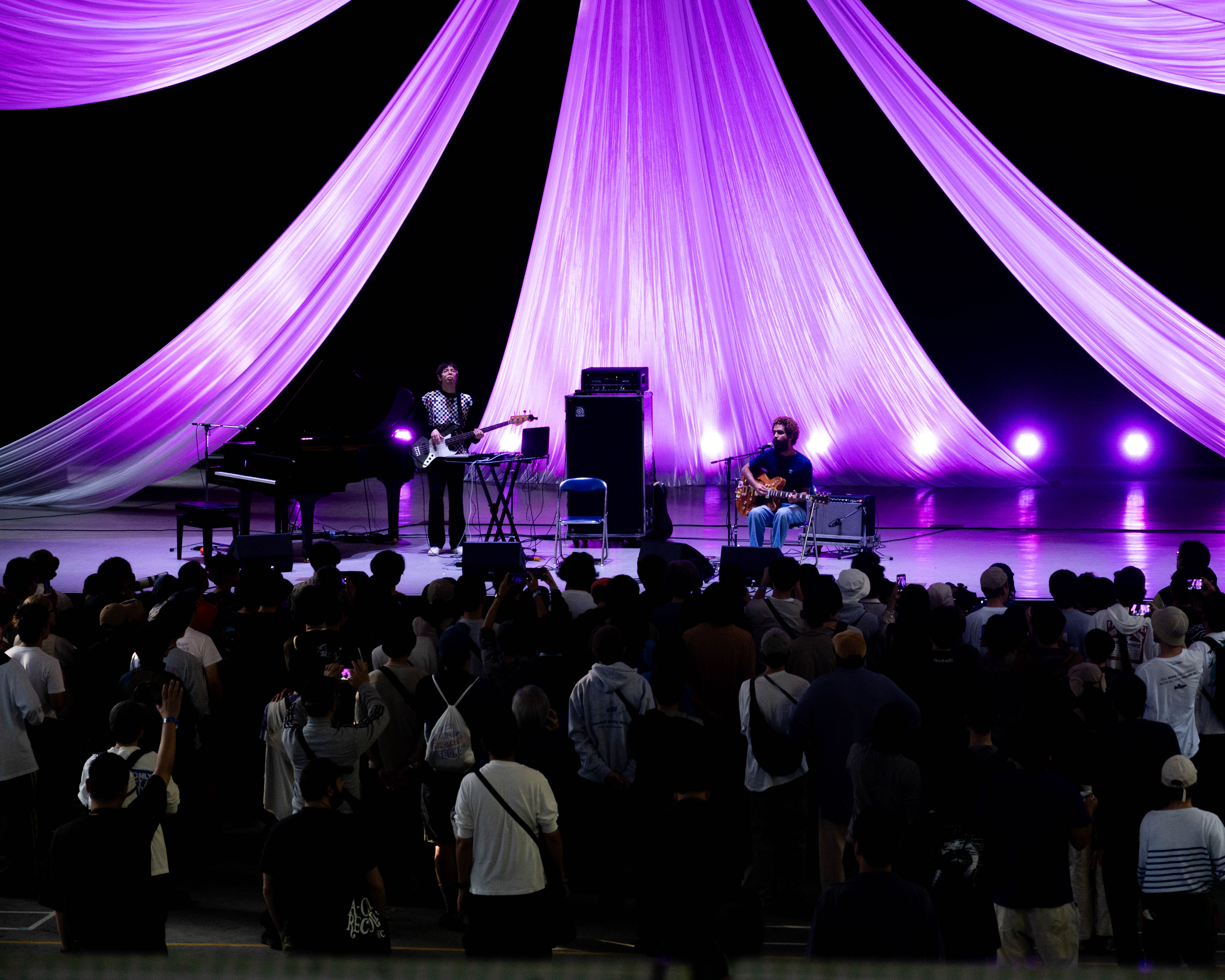
- Berle (right) performing with Batata Boy in Japan

Background information
- Born: Macéio, Alagoas, Brazil
- Genres: Lo-fi; MPB
- Occupations: Singer; songwriter; musician
- Years active: 2013–present
- Labels: Far Out; Batata; Coala
- Website: www.faroutrecordings.com/artist/396907-bruno-berle?lang=en_US

Bruno Berle is a Brazilian singer, songwriter, and musician from the northeastern state of Alagoas.

== Early life ==
Bruno Berle was born in Maceió, Alagoas' capital and largest city. His father introduced him to the guitar at the young age of seven. While still in Alagoas, Berle attained higher education in mathematics before eventually relocating to São Paulo to concentrate on music.

== Career ==
Berle was active in the Maceió music scene prior to his move south. He debuted on Bandcamp in 2013 with Arapiraca, an 8-track LP awash with folk melodies and soft vocals. During this time, he joined the soft-rock band Troco Em Bala, with whom he's released two singles, an EP, and an album. Berle also helped found The Mozões ("Sweethearts"), a collective of over a dozen musicians from Alagoas and Pernambuco, in 2015. They released a self-titled album that same year. He formed Batata Records with frequent collaborator and close hometown friend Leonardo Acioli, professionally known as Batata Boy.

Some time before 2020, Berle arrived in São Paulo to pursue music more seriously. His first full-length, a self-titled Batata Records release, appeared on Bandcamp in the middle of quarantine. The album got a studio rerelease in 2022, newly titled No Reino Dos Afetos, after Berle signed with label Far Out Recordings. His second studio album with Far Out, No Reino Dos Afetos 2, dropped in 2024. Berle has long been recognized in his hometown scene, but has begun to garner more international attention with the releases of his latest albums.

== Artistry ==
Berle's music draws from all aspects of MPB (Música Popular Brasileira) tradition, including samba, bossa nova, Tropicália, and folk elements. He has been lauded by critics for successfully mixing traditional sounds with his modern lo-fi and "bedroom pop" sensibilities. He strives to create representation of black queer love with his music, noticeably through his description of a weekend-long relationship in No Reino Dos Afetos 2. Berle has been quoted as seeing himself alongside fellow Brazilian artists Tim Bernardes, Bala Desejo, and Ana Frango Elétrico.

== Discography ==
=== Studio albums ===
- No Reino Dos Afetos (2022)
- No Reino Dos Afetos 2 (2024)

=== Digital releases ===
- Arapiraca (2013)
- Bruno Berle (2020, rereleased in 2022 as No Reino Dos Afetos)

=== With Troco Em Bala ===
- Troco em Bala (2014), Single
- Agreste (2015), LP
- Troco em Bala 2 (2020), Single
- 3 (2022), EP

=== With The Mozões ===
- The Mozões (2015)
