= BaianaSystem =

Brazilian musical group

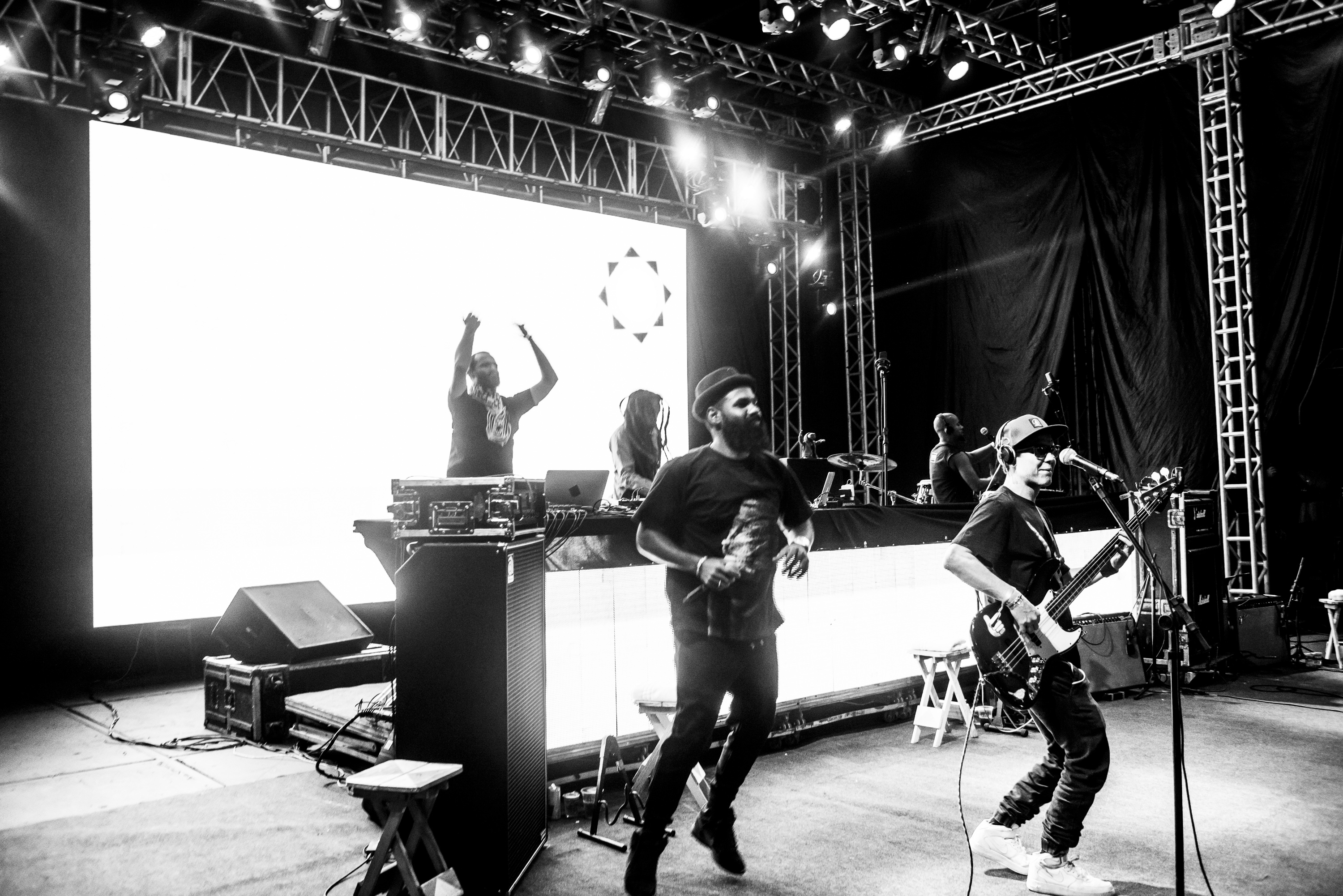

Background information
- Origin: Brazil
- Genres: Samba reggae
- Members: Russo Passapusso; Roberto Barreto; SekoBass; JapaSystem; Junix; Filipe Cartaxo

BaianaSystem, sometimes spelled Baiana System, is a Brazilian musical group formed in Salvador, Bahia in 2007.

== History of the band ==
The band formed in 2009, and released their first work, the album BaianaSystem, in 2010. In 2015, their song "Playsom" was included in the soundtrack of the videogame FIFA 16. In 2017, they won the Brazilian Music Awards for Best Group in the "Pop/Rock/Reggae/Hip-hop/Funk" category and for Revelation of the Year, and their song "Invisível" was nominated as Song of the Year at the Multishow Brazilian Music Award. In 2019, their album O futuro não demora won the Latin Grammy Award for Best Portuguese Language Rock or Alternative Album. In 2021, their album OxeAxeExu was nominated for a Latin Grammy Award in the same category.

BaianaSystem is a Brazilian musical project founded with the aim of merging traditional Bahian music with the cultural elements of Jamaican sound systems. The name "Baiana System" reflects this fusion: "Baiana" refers to the Bahian guitar, a key instrument in Bahia's musical heritage, while "System" draws from the concept of Jamaican sound systems, which are characterized by large public sound setups used for playing music and creating an immersive cultural environment. The project was conceived with the goal of creating a unique musical environment that integrates the Bahian guitar as one of the central voices of the sound system, an approach that also influenced the development of electric trios in Bahia. This style blends traditional music with modern production techniques, where sound system aesthetics are employed to produce instrumental bases upon which songs are performed. The project also places strong emphasis on the visual aspects of the music, with illustrations and imagery being integral to the overall artistic expression. Through experimentation, BaianaSystem evolved into a multifaceted cultural project, combining music, visuals, and performance art to create a distinctive and vibrant representation of Bahia’s musical landscape.

Very active in the international festival circuit, the band performed in major events including New Orleans Jazz Festival, Roskilde Festival, Rock in Rio, Fuji Rock Festival, Expo 2010, WOMEX, Au Foin de la Rue.

== Discography ==
Studio albums

- Baianasystem (2010)
- Duas Cidades (2016)
- O Futuro Não Demora (2019)
- OxeAxeExu (2021)
- O Mundo Dá Voltas (2025)
