= Lagum =

Brazilian pop band

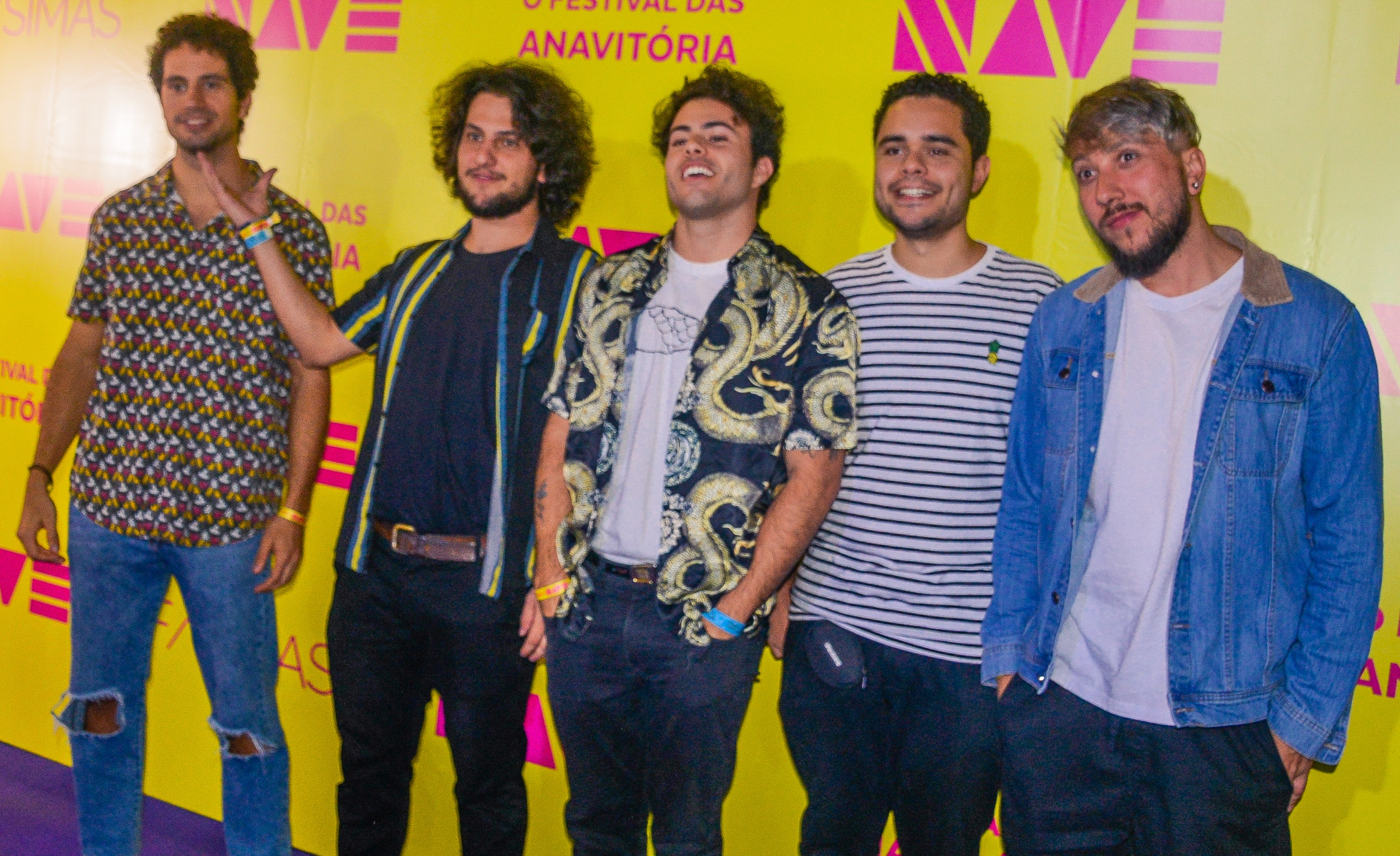
- Lagum in 2019

Background information
- Origin: Brumadinho, Minas Gerais, Brazil
- Genres: Pop; Pop rock; Reggae
- Years active: 2014-present
- Labels: Sony Music
- Members: Francisco Jardim; Jorge Borges; Otávio Cardoso; Pedro Calais
- Past members: Tio Wilson
- Website: lagum.com.br

Lagum is a Brazilian band formed in the state of Minas Gerais, Brazil, in 2014 by Pedro Calais (vocalist), Otavio Cardoso (guitarist), Jorge Borges (guitarist), and Francisco Jardim (bassist). Their first album, Seja o Que Eu Quiser, was launched in 2016. Between albums, their single, "Deixa", became popular on radios and streaming platforms, bringing the group to national attention in Brazil. In 2019, their second album, Coisas da Geração, was released and attracted prominence to the group in Brazil and other parts of the world. In 2021, Memórias (de onde eu nunca fui), was released and nominated for the Latin Grammy Awards.

== History ==
In 2014, while in the city of Belo Horizonte, Pedro Calais posted a video of some of his compositions on Facebook. One of his friends, who worked as an event promoter at a performance venue, saw his video and encouraged him to assemble a band to perform at the venue. Subsequently, Calais called his childhood friends Otavio Cardoso, Glauco Borges, Francisco Jardim, and Breno Braga, to perform with him. The group began their career playing their music at this performance venue.

In May 2016, the group released their first studio album entitled Seja o Que Eu Quiser. In February 2018, in collaboration with the singer Ana Gabriela, they launched an acoustic version of the song Deixa, which became one of the most-played songs in Brazil and brought attention to the group. Following Deixa, the group signed a contract with Sony. In June 2019, the group released their second studio album, Coisas da Geração.

On 12 September 2020, the group performed at two drive-in shows in the city of Nova Lima. However, between the two performances, percussionist Tio Wilson (Breno Braga) became ill and died from a heart attack.

In 2021, the group returned to the stage with their third studio album, Memórias (de onde eu nunca fui), with Glauco Mendes on drums.

== Discography ==
- Seja o Que Eu Quiser (2016)
- Coisas da Geração (2019)
- Memórias (de onde eu nunca fui) (2021)
- Depois do Fim (2023)

== Awards and nominations ==
Year	Award	Category	Result	Ref.
2019	Meus Prêmios Nick	Revelação do Ano	Nominated	
2019	Prêmio Multishow de Música Brasileira	Fiat Argo Experimente	Won	
2019	Prêmio Contigo! Online	Revelação Musical	Nominated	
2020	Prêmio Multishow de Música Brasileira	Grupo Do Ano	Won	
2021	MTV Miaw	Artista Musical	Nominated	
2021	Prêmio Multishow de Música Brasileira	Grupo do Ano	Won	
2022	MTV Millennial Awards	Feat. Nacional	Nominated	
2022	Prêmio Multishow de Música Brasileira	Grupo Do Ano	Won	
