= Mari Fernandez =

Brazilian singer and songwriter (born 2001)

- Fernandez in 2022
- Born: Mariana Fernandes de Sousa; 19 February 2001 (age 25); Alto Santo, Ceará, Brazil
- Occupations: Singer; songwriter; businesswoman; instrumentalist
- Years active: 2021–present
- Spouse: Júlia Ribeiro (m. 2025)
- Musical career
- Genres: Forró; piseiro; sertanejo
- Instruments: Vocals; classical guitar
- Label: Sony Music

Mariana Fernandes de Sousa (born 19 February 2001), known professionally as Mari Fernandez, is a Brazilian singer, songwriter, businesswoman and instrumentalist. She became known for the songs "Não, Não Vou", which started her career, and for the song "Parada Louca", released in partnership with singer Marcynho Sensação.

Born in Alto Santo, Fernandez began singing at the age of seven, at school and in the churches she attended, giving the first signs of her interest in a musical career. At ten, she got her first guitar, and started learning to play with the help of her stepfather, and at fifteen, she wrote her first song.

Fernandez began her career in 2021, when she released her album "Piseiro Sofrência", among which the song "Não, Não Vou" stood out, which reached number one on Spotify Brasil. Between 2021 and 2024, she released songs such as "Comunicação Falhou", "Eu Gosto Assim" and "Seu Brilho Sumiu", among others, with partnerships such as Nattan, Gustavo Mioto, Israel & Rodolffo and Maiara & Maraisa.

== Early life ==
Mariana Fernandes de Sousa was born in Alto Santo, Ceará on 19 February 2001, the first daughter of Kilvia Fernandes. She fell in love with music from an early age, at the age of seven she started singing at school and religious conferences through an aunt. At the age of 10, she received her first guitar at a festival held in her town, and began to learn to play with the help of her stepfather, who also did not master the instrument, and thus began to take her first steps in music.

With the intention of pursuing a musical career, Fernandez began composing songs professionally, having written her first song at the age of 15, which was born through a lived story. It was from then on that she decided to become a professional once and for all, after finishing high school, she left the countryside for the capital, to try her hand at life as a songwriter. Fernandez worked other jobs to support herself, but still dedicated time to composing, setting aside three hours a day. Over time, Fernandez performed her compositions in the voice of forró and piseiro artists, such as Tarcísio do Acordeon and Vitor Fernandes.

== Musical career ==
=== 2021: Piseiro Sofrência e "Não, Não Vou" ===
Fernandez's first opportunity to sing professionally was through recommendations from friends who made the singer meet her manager; he needed a female voice for a piseiro project. On 29 April, Fernandez's debut studio album Piseiro Sofrência was released with 10 tracks and the collaboration of Vitor Fernandes. During the recording, she adopted her stage name with a ‘Z’ at the end.

Among the songs on the album, the song "Não, Não Vou" stood out after gaining notoriety through the "dances" on the short video app TikTok, and being broadcast by several personalities such as Gkay, Lexa, Tirullipa, Neymar, Virginia Fonseca and Rafa Kalimann. The single reached Top 1 on Spotify Brasil, also entering the Global chart, in Paraguay and Portugal. This feat was repeated by "Parada Louca", a song released in partnership with Marcynho Sensação. In August 2021, Fernandez signed with the record label Sony Music, being the first artist on the Filtr Lab project, the label's program that aims to boost rising artists.

=== 2022: Rise, Albums, Tour and business ventures ===
In January 2022, Fernandez signed a contract with the production company Vybbe, which has singer Xand Avião as one of its shareholders. On 20 April, the singer released her first live album, entitled Ao Vivo em Fortaleza, which was recorded in Fortaleza and featured the collaboration of Nattan, Simone & Simaria, Xand Avião and Zé Vaqueiro. In July, Fernandez launched her first tour, called Mari Sem Fim, which aimed to last until dawn and travel throughout the country.

On 16 September, the song "Eu Gosto Assim" was released in collaboration with Gustavo Mioto, a song that is part of the celebration of the singer's 10-year career. On 8 October 2022, 23 days after its release, the song reached 1st place on the Top 1 Brazil chart on the Spotify streaming platform after having debuted at position 115. “Eu Gosto Assim” spent more than a month at the top of the chart, in addition to also reaching first place on Deezer and Top 10 on the radio. The music video also ranked first among the most watched music videos on YouTube Brazil and had 39 million views on 10 November 2022. The song also topped the Top 50 Streaming chart for two months and topped the Brazil Songs chart for six weeks.

On 1 December, Fernandez began her career as a businesswoman and began managing singer and friend Marttin Monteiro. Two weeks later, Fernandez released her second studio album Quando Tem Sentimento, with 10 tracks and the participation of Murilo Huff.

=== 2023-present: Ao Vivo em São Paulo ===
In April 2023, Fernandez released her second DVD and second live album, which was recorded in São Paulo for an audience of more than 7 thousand people. Those who participated in this included Luísa Sonza, Maiara & Maraisa, Hugo & Guilherme and Wesley Safadão.

== Personal life ==
On 21 November 2023, Fernandez publicly came out as bisexual in an interview with the podcast "PodCats". On 31 August 2024, she announced her relationship with dentistry student and model Júlia Ribeiro, through a video on her social media in which she surprised her with a bouquet of flowers and states: "My heart is in your hands". The couple married on 14 October 2025. They have a daughter, who was born on 1 October 2026, as announced through their social media networks.

== Musical style and inspiration ==
Fernandez's musical inspirations encompass numerous genres, mainly forró, sertanejo and piseiro. In an interview with the website Tenho Mais Discos Que Amigos! in August 2021, Fernandez stated that she had as references Alceu Valença, Marília Mendonça, Os Barões da Pisadinha, Zé Vaqueiro, Xand Avião, Solange Almeida and Wesley Safadão. In December 2023, in an interview with FM radio O Dia, Fernandez reaffirmed her inspiration for Marília, and also mentioned the duo Maiara & Maraisa, highlighting the importance of the three for "breaking taboos" in relation to the female presence in music.

== Awards and nominations ==
In her first year of her career, Fernandez received four nominations, two for the TikTok Awards, one for the Contigo! Online and another at the WME Awards. In 2023, Fernandez won her first awards at the Prêmio Jovem Brasileiro, in the Young Singer and Best Feat categories.

Year	Award	Category	Recipient(s) and nominee(s)	Result	Ref.
2021	TikTok Awards	Hit of the Year	"Não, Não Vou" – Mari Fernandez	Nominated	
2021	TikTok Awards	Eu Não Nasci, Eu Estreei	Mari Fernandez	Nominated	
2021	Prêmio Contigo! Online	Musical Revelation	Mari Fernandez	Nominated	
2021	WME Awards	Mainstream Music	"Não, Não Vou" – Mari Fernandez	Nominated	
2022	MTV MIAW Awards Brazil	Hino de Karaokê	"Parada Louca" – Mari Fernandez and Marcynho Sensação	Nominated	
2022	Multishow Brazilian Music Award	New Artist	Mari Fernandez	Nominated	
2022	WME Awards	Mainstream Music	"Parada Louca" – Mari Fernandez	Nominated	
2023	Prêmio Jovem Brasileiro	Best Young Singer	Mari Fernandez	Won	
2023	Prêmio Jovem Brasileiro	Hit of the Year	"Seu Brilho Sumiu" – Israel & Rodolffo and Mari Fernandez	Nominated	
2023	Prêmio Jovem Brasileiro	Best Feat	"Seu Brilho Sumiu" – Israel & Rodolffo and Mari Fernandez	Won	
2023	WME Awards	Show	“Pra Lascar o Coração” – Mari Fernandez	Nominated	
2023	WME Awards	Mainstream Music	"Seu Brilho Sumiu" – Mari Fernandez	Nominated	
