= Federal Institute of Pernambuco =

Public university in Recife, Brazil

Instituto Federal de Educação, Ciência e Tecnologia de Pernambuco
- Type: Public
- Established: 1909
- Rector: José Carlos de Sá
- Students: 21,000
- Location: Recife, Pernambuco, Brazil; 8°3′6″S 34°57′3″W
- Campus: Urban
- Website: official site

The Pernambuco Federal Institute of Education, Science, and Technology (Portuguese: Instituto Federal de Educação, Ciência e Tecnologia de Pernambuco, IFPE) is a Brazilian institution of higher education located in Pernambuco State, Brazil. Its rectory is headquartered in Recife, Pernambuco. The IFPE is one of the oldest and most traditional among the Federal Institutes, it has 9 campuses and offers Technical, undergraduate and postgraduate courses, as well as researches and scientific production.

== History ==
The IFPE was founded on September 23, 1909, when the former Brazilian president Nilo Peçanha signed the Decree Nº 7.566, creating the Escolas de Aprendizes e Artífices (Craftsmen and Apprentices's Schools) making it the oldest federal institute in Brazil. It has already been given numerous names, such as: Escola de Artifíces do Recife (Recife's Craftsmen's School), Liceu Industrial (Industrial Lyceum), Escola Técnica do Recife (Recife's Vocational School) and Escola Técnica Federal de Pernambuco (Pernambuco's Federal Vocational School - ETFPE). Most of those names were related to its reason to exist: Give an industrial education with high standards for Pernambuco's people, specially the less fortunate.

The IFPE has been hosted in 4 different locations until now, they were: The Mercado Delmiro Gouveia, in the Derby Neighborhood (1910–1923), moving to The Ginásio Pernambucano School, and finally settling back in Derby. In 1975, the IFPE suffered its biggest disaster: a huge flooding hit Recife, leaving two thirds of the city underwater. Since the school was hosted on the banks of the Capibaribe River, it was severely affected. After this, on 17 January 1983, the school decided to move to a new and today's location, at the Cidade Universitária neighborhood.

This neighborhood is the most education-centered in Recife: many education-oriented organizations are hosted there: the Federal University of Pernambuco (UFPE), the Pernambuco Federal Institute of Technology (ITEP), the Regional Center of Nuclear Science (CRCN), the Superintendence for the Northeast Development (Sudene), and the Recife Military School (CMR). Its infrastructure was considered a model for all the technical schools of the time.

=== Recent Times ===
In 1999, the IFPE was renamed to Centro Federal de Educação Tecnológica de Pernambuco (Pernambuco's Federal Center of Technological Education, CEFET-PE), which started offering undergraduate courses in a technical level. Since that time the IFPE is innovating in technical courses, being pioneer to start the Work Security course (Portuguese: Segurança do Trabalho), which allows the professional to administer factors such as hygiene and security in a technician level, specially in the area of civil construction.

In 2008, was finally named Instituto Federal de Ciência e Tecnologia de Pernambuco. Which allows it to offer bachelor's and master's degrees in the Science, Engineering and Technological areas.

The Civil Production Engineering course can be highlighted as one of its actions. Since Brazil is in a boom in its Economy and civil construction, there's a lack of civil engineers and architects, the course has the mission to form engineers who can manage and improve the level and quality of production, beyond the standard formation offered in the Civil Engineering course. It is the first course of its kind in the north-northeastern part of Brazil.

== See also ==
- Federal University of Pernambuco
