= Nattan =

Brazilian singer and songwriter (born 1998)

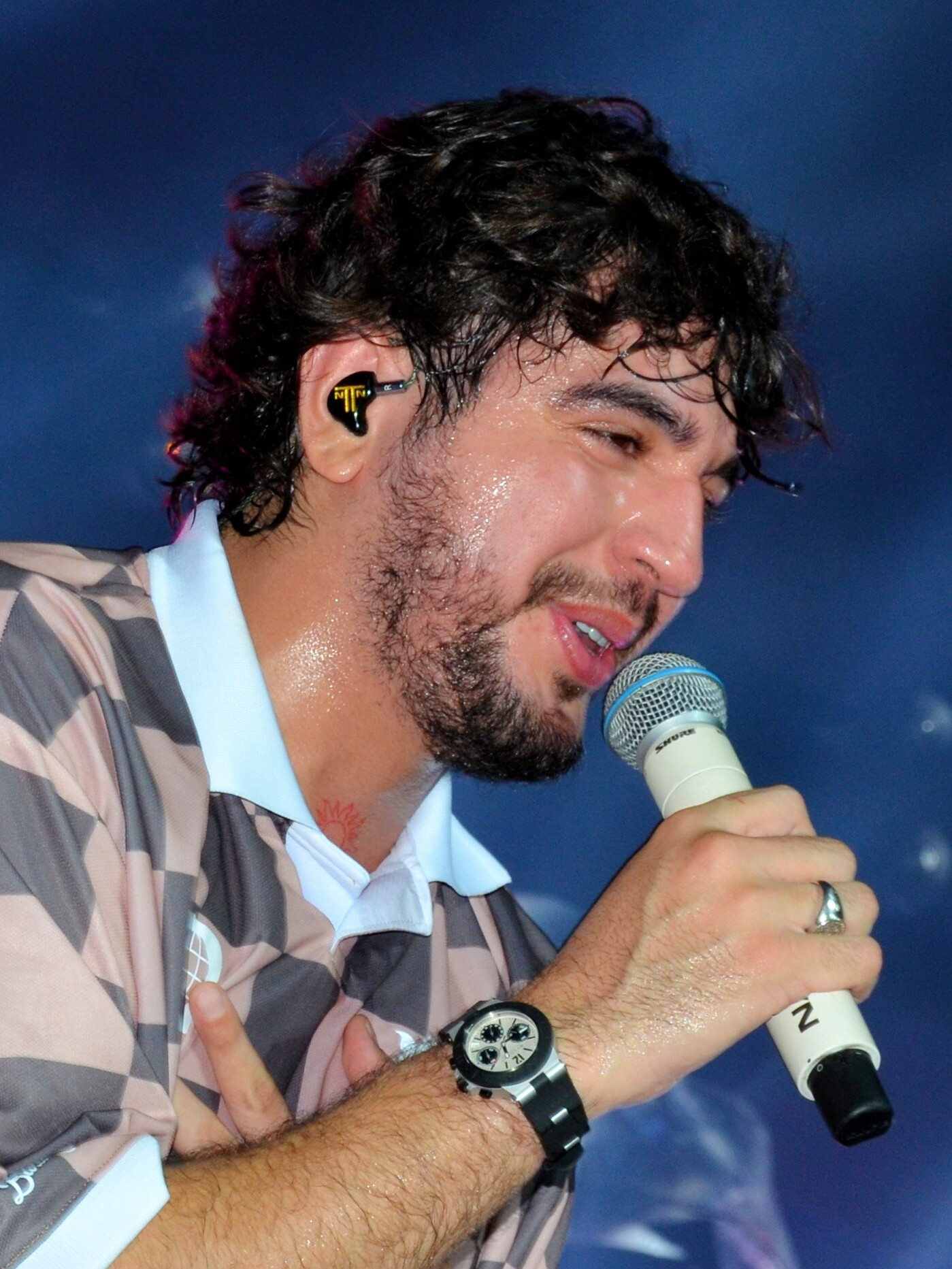
- Nattan in September 2024

Background information
- Also known as: Nattanzinho
- Born: Natanael Cesário dos Santos; 18 August 1998 (age 28); Sobral, Ceará, Brazil
- Genre: Electronic forró
- Occupations: Singer; songwriter
- Instrument: Vocals
- Years active: 2015-present
- Label: Vybbe

Natanael Cesário dos Santos (born 18 August 1998), commonly known as Nattan or Nattanzinho, is a Brazilian forró singer and songwriter. He is considered one of the main names in forró.

== Early life ==
Nattan was born in Sobral, in the interior of Ceará, on 18 August 1998. However, he spent his childhood and adolescence in Tianguá, also in the interior of the state. His interest in music came through the Church of Jesus Christ of Latter-day Saints. According to Nattan, he would see people playing the piano in church, look at the sheet music and try to play, accompanying the music. He said that the church "embraced" even people who did not follow the religion, especially children. At the age of 9, he received a guitar as a gift from his grandmother and learned to play on his own, with the help of tutorials on YouTube. It was then that, at just 12 years old, Nattan began to perform in bars. Still unable to buy his own equipment, he rented it. The musician continued to perform in bars, and, at 14, he began to pay his own school tuition, which cost around R$300.

== Career ==
Seeing his artistic potential, Nattan decided to become a professional and sought out new audiences, which led him to move from Tianguá to Sobral. With the support of Armando Carneiro, Ávine Vinny's manager, Nattan had the opportunity to expand his career in Fortaleza. In 2019, he released the song "Era Eu" in partnership with Ávine, which gained notoriety after being re-recorded by Raí Saia Rodada. Coincidentally, at the same time, Nattan was already friends with Mari Fernandez, with whom he performed in Fortaleza.

His musical style stands out for its electronic forró, also incorporating pisadinha, in tracks such as "Storiezin" and collaborations with Zé Vaqueiro. Nattan explores international influences in his songs, such as in the track "Não te Quero", an adaptation of Bryan Adams' "Heaven". The singer is known for his catchphrase "É o Nattanzinho, falar de amor", stating that his romantic voice is inspired by Adams.

Still under the stage name Nathanzinho, in 2019, he released his first song and, upon gaining national prominence, began using the name Nattan. He was sponsored by Xand Avião and collaborated with artists such as Mari Fernandez, Saia Rodada, Felipe Amorim, among others. Among his main hits on Spotify are “Comunicação Falhou” and “Tem Cabaré Essa Noite”, which reached the top 10 of the most listened to songs on Spotify Brazil, reaching 7th place in the ranking. The hit “Não te Quero” reached first place on Spotify's ‘Viral 50’ list and guaranteed the singer 15th place among viral songs in Brazil.

In April 2024, Nattan reached the top of the Spotify Brazil charts with the song "Amor na Praia", a reinterpretation of "Praise Jah in the Moonlight" by American singer YG Marley. His first album as Nattan, entitled “Para Beber, Curtir e Amar”, has 23 tracks and helped him establish himself as one of the biggest names in Brazilian forró today.

== Personal life ==
Nattan was raised by his mother and maternal grandparents, as he lost contact with his father when he was just two years old. After years, his mother decided to give more details about his father, but Nattan preferred not to know more details about the story.

In 2022, while he was seeing his dream of becoming famous come true, the singer's mother, Rosilene Santos, was diagnosed with cancer. With his life as an artist getting on track, Nattan had to divide his time between fulfilling his career commitments and often suffering away from his mother who was undergoing cancer treatment. Despite everything, in an interview with Podcats in 2023, the singer revealed that his mother had beaten cancer. In December 2024, he began dating actress and businesswoman Rafa Kalimann.

== Discography ==
=== Studio albums ===
List of studio albums, with selected details
Title	Details
Vamos Dar Play No Nathanzinho	Released: 14 January 2021; Label: Vybbe; Formats: Digital download
Pelado	Released: 12 July 2022; Label: Vybbe; Formats: Digital download

=== Live albums ===
List of live albums, with selected details
Title	Details	Certifications
O Fantástico Mundo De Nattan	Released: 9 February 2022; Formats: DVD, digital download; Label: Believe Music	PMB: Platinum
Estilo Nattanzinho - Ao Vivo em São Paulo	Released: 8 August 2024; Formats: DVD, digital download; Label: Believe Music	

== Filmography ==
=== Television ===
Year	Title	Role
2023	Dança dos Famosos	Participant
2024	Hoje É Dia das Crianças	Himself
2024	Tô Nessa	Oziel da Pisadinha
