= Ana Castela =

Brazilian singer-songwriter (born 2003)

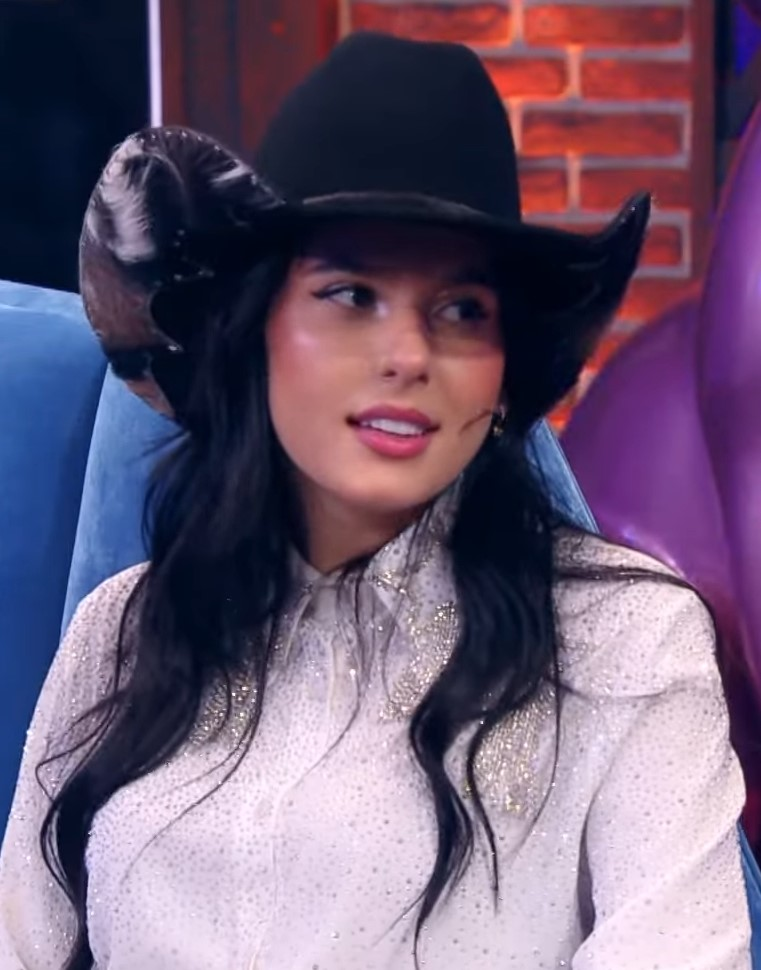
- Castela in 2024
- Born: Ana Flávia Castela; 16 November 2003 (age 22); Amambai, Mato Grosso do Sul, Brazil
- Occupation: Singer-songwriter
- Years active: 2021–present
- Musical career
- Genres: Pop; sertanejo universitário; agronejo; electronica
- Instruments: Vocals, guitar
- Label: AgroPlay

Signature
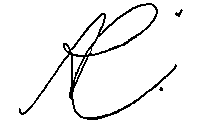

Ana Flávia Castela (born 16 November 2003), also known as the Boiadeira, is a Brazilian singer-songwriter. She is recognized as one of the disseminators of agronejo music in Brazil.

== Biography ==
Born in Amambai, Castela grew up in Sete Quedas, near the border with Paraguay, in that country she would frequently visit her grandparents. In 2019, she made her professional debut as a member of the Christian choir Coração de Maria.

Castela made her record debut in 2021, with the single "Boiadeira", and had her breakout in 2022, with the number 1 hit "Pipoco", that she recorded with Melody and DJ Chris No Beat. The same year, she was awarded revelation of the year at the Multishow Brazilian Music Awards.

== Personal life ==
A descendant of Spanish, Portuguese, and Italian immigrants, Ana was born in Amambai, but grew up in Sete Quedas and later moved to Londrina, Paraná. She lives with her sister and parents in a mansion, and has collections of hats and boots, as well as various gifts received from fans throughout her career. Castela owns a small farm located near her house.

Currently, Ana Castela maintains a relationship with singer Gustavo Mioto. About the relationship, the singers even revealed that they preferred not to give labels. On the subject, Mioto said "It bothers me that everything needs to be labeled, because it takes time to understand what it will be: if we are up for it, if we want it or not". Such decision was maintained until June 2023, when, on Brazilian Valentine's Day, the singers made their relationship official.

== Discography ==
=== As a lead artist ===
List of singles as lead artist, with selected chart positions, showing year released and album name
Title	Year	Peak chart positions				Album
Title	Year	BRA (airplay)	BRA (sales)	GLO	POR	Album
"Boiadeira"	2021	—	—	—	—	—
"Boiadeira (funk remix)" (featuring Lucas Beat)	2021	—	—	—	—	—
"Nois é da Roça Bebê"	2021	—	—	—	—	—
"Neon"	2021	—	—	—	—	—
"As Brutas do Agro" (featuring Antoniela Bigatão)	2021	—	—	—	—	—
"Chama" (featuring Luan Pereira	2021	—	—	—	—	Da Roça Pro Mundo
"As Menina da Pecuária" (featuring Léo & Raphael)	2021	—	—	—	—	—
"As Menina da Pecuária (Remix)" (featuring Davi Kneip)	2022	—	—	—	—	—
"Neon (Remix)" (featuring Davi Kneip)	2022	—	—	—	—	—
"Juliet e Chapelão" (featuring Luan Pereira and DJ Chris no Beat)	2022	—	—	—	—	—
"Pipoco" (featuring Melody & DJ Chris no Beat)	2022	42	1	113	—	—
"Reverse" (featuring Hitmaker)	2022	—	—	—	—	—
"Dona de Mim"	2022	99	21	—	—	—
"Nosso Quadro"	2023	26	1	95	—	AgroPlay Verão, Vol. 1
"Chora, Me Liga (Remix)" (featuring DJ Chris no Beat)	2023	—	—	—	—	—
"Carinha de Bebê" (featuring Pedro Sampaio)	2023	—	—	—	173	—
"Vaqueiro Apaixonado" (featuring Luan Pereira)	2023	—	—	—	—	AgroPlay Verão, Vol. 2
"Covardia" (featuring Wesley Safadão)	2023	—	—	—	—	—
"Tranqueiro"	2023	—	—	—	—	—
"—" denotes a recording that did not chart or was not released in that territory.

=== As featured artist ===
Title	Year	Peak chart positions		Album
Title	Year	BRA Airplay	POR	Album
"Fazendinha Sessions #1: È Disso Que Nóis Gosta" (Fazendinha Sessions feat. Us Agroboy, Léo & Raphael, Ana Castela e Luan Pereira)	2022	—	—	—
"Ô Lá Na Roça" (Felipe & Murillo feat. Ana Castela)	2022	—	—	—
"Fazendinha Sessions #2: Vai Ser Bão Pra Lá" (Fazendinha Sessions feat. Loubet, Us Agroboy, Luan Pereira, Lucca & Mateus, Ana Castela. Lucas Reis & Thácio)	2022	—	—	—
"Coragem" (Jottapê feat. Ana Castela)	2022	—	—	Cowboy do Mandelão
"Casalzão" (Hugo & Heitor feat. Ana Castela)	2022	—	—	—
"Bombonzinho" (Israel & Rodolffo feat. Ana Castela)	2022	—	43	Let's Bora, Vol. 1
"Roça Em Mim" (Zé Felipe feat. Ana Castela e Luan Pereira)	2022	—	18	—
"Agronejo" (DJ Chris no Beat feat. Ana Castela)	2022	—	—	—
"Eu Sem Você Não Dá" (César Menotti & Fabiano feat. Ana Castela)	2022	—	—	—
"Palhaça" (Naiara Azevedo feat. Ana Castela)	2023	—	—	Plural
"Eu Minto" (US Agroboy feat. Ana Castela)	2023	—	—	A Roça no Topo
"Duas Três"	2023	—	107	—
"Não Para"	2023	—	78	—
"Fazendinha Sessions 3: Som do Interior" (Fazendinha Sessions feat. João Carreiro, Us Agroboy, Hungria Hip Hop, Luan Pereira, DJ Chris no Beat, Felipe Amorim e Ana Castela)	2023	—	—	—
"Sinônimos" (Chitãozinho e Xororó feat. Ana Castela)	2023	—	—	—
"O Que Acontece Na Roça Fica na Roça" (Loubet feat. Ana Castela)	2023	—	—	10 Anos
"—" denotes a recording that did not chart or was not released in that territory.
