= Menos É Mais =

Brazilian musical group

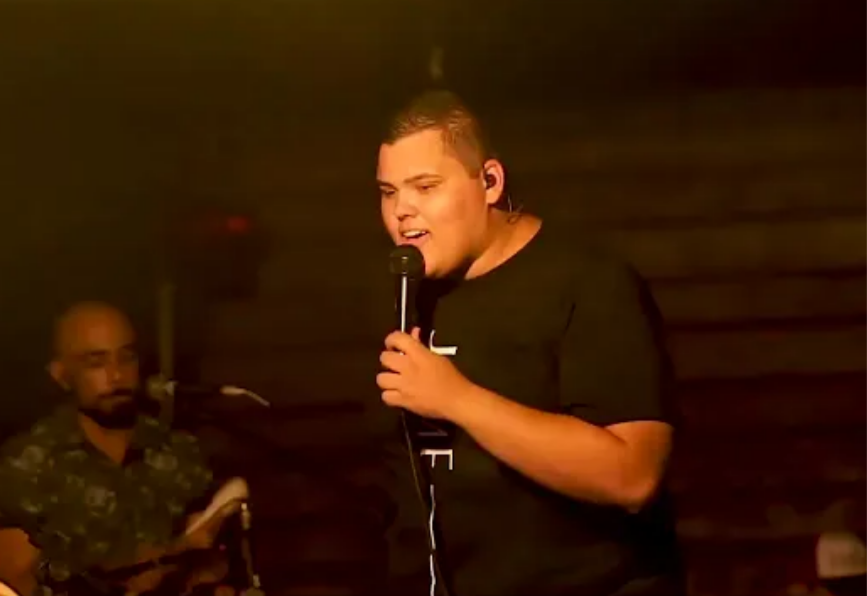
- Menos É Mais in 2022.

Background information
- Origin: Gama, Federal District, Brazil
- Genre: Pagode
- Years active: 2016–present
- Label: Som Livre
- Members: Duzão; Gustavo Goes; Paulinho Félix; Ramon Alvarenga
- Past members: Jorge Farias

Menos É Mais is a Brazilian pagode group that was created in 2016 in the city of Gama, in the Federal District, by Duzão (vocals), Gustavo Goes (repique), Paulinho Félix (pandeiro), Ramon Alvarenga (surdo), and Jorge Farias (tantã). The group gained notoriety for rerecording old songs and covers of hits by other singers.

== History ==
Menos É Mais began to perform in November 2016 coming from the initiative of three musicians: Gustavo Goes, Jorge Farias, and Pietro Silva, who played samba and pagode together on sporadic occasions and at parties. The trio received their opportunity to play weekly at a bar in Taguatinga, at Taguaparque. During this period, Alvarega left the group to be with family. In 2018, the vocalist Eduardo Caetano (Duzão) joined the group.

That same year, they began to publish their performances on YouTube, but came to national fame in 2020 during the COVID-19 pandemic. During the lockdown, they did live performances on social media, increasing their views and their popularity through them being shared by famous people such as football players Neymar and Thiago Silva.

In 2021, Menos É Mais released Plano Piloto, their first album, with the hit Lapada Dela, with participation by Matheus Fernandes, becoming one of the most played in the country on Spotify.

In 2025, they released Molho, recorded in various parts of Brazil. In April, they launched the song P do Pecado, recorded with Simone Mendes in Campina Grande, Paraíba, which broke the record for the most time in 1st place on the charts for Spotify Brasil, beating "Sorry" by Justin Bieber.

== Members ==
=== Current line-up ===
- Duzão – vocals (2016–present)
- Gustavo Goes – repique (2016–present)
- Paulinho Félix – pandeiro (2016–present)
- Ramon Alvarenga – surdo (2016–present)

=== Former members ===
- Jorge Farias – tantã (2016–2024)

== Discography ==
=== Live albums ===
Album	Details	Sales	Certifications
Ao Vivo no Buteco	Release: 29 April 2019; Formats: digital download, streaming; Record label: Independent		
Ao Vivo: No Brazólia	Release: 1 November 2019; Formats: digital download, streaming; Record label: Som Livre		
Churrasquinho Menos É Mais	Release: 23 April 2020; Formats: digital download, streaming; Record label: Som Livre	PMB: 80,000	PMB: platinum
Ensaio do Menos É Mais	Release: 2 July 2020; Formats: digital download, streaming; Record label: Independent		
Menos É Mais nos Arcos	Release: 10 July 2020; Formats: digital download, streaming; Record label: Som Livre		
Na Mesma Roda	Release: 13 November 2020; Formats: digital download, streaming; Record label: Independent		
Plano Piloto	Release: 23 April 2021; Formats: DVD, digital download, streaming; Record label: Som Livre		

=== Singles ===
Year	Title	Best positions	Certification	Album
Year	Title	BRA	Certification	Album
2019	"Vai Me Dando Corda"	—		
2020	"Recaída	—		
2020	"Homem de Ferro"	—		
2020	"Adorei"	—	2x platinum	Plano Piloto
2021	"Pagando Mal Com Mal"	—		Plano Piloto
	"—" denota singles que não entraram nas paradas musicais ou não foram lançados no país.			

== Awards and nominations ==
Year	Award	Category	Result
2020	Multishow Brazilian Music Awards	Experimente	Won
