= João Gomes (singer) =

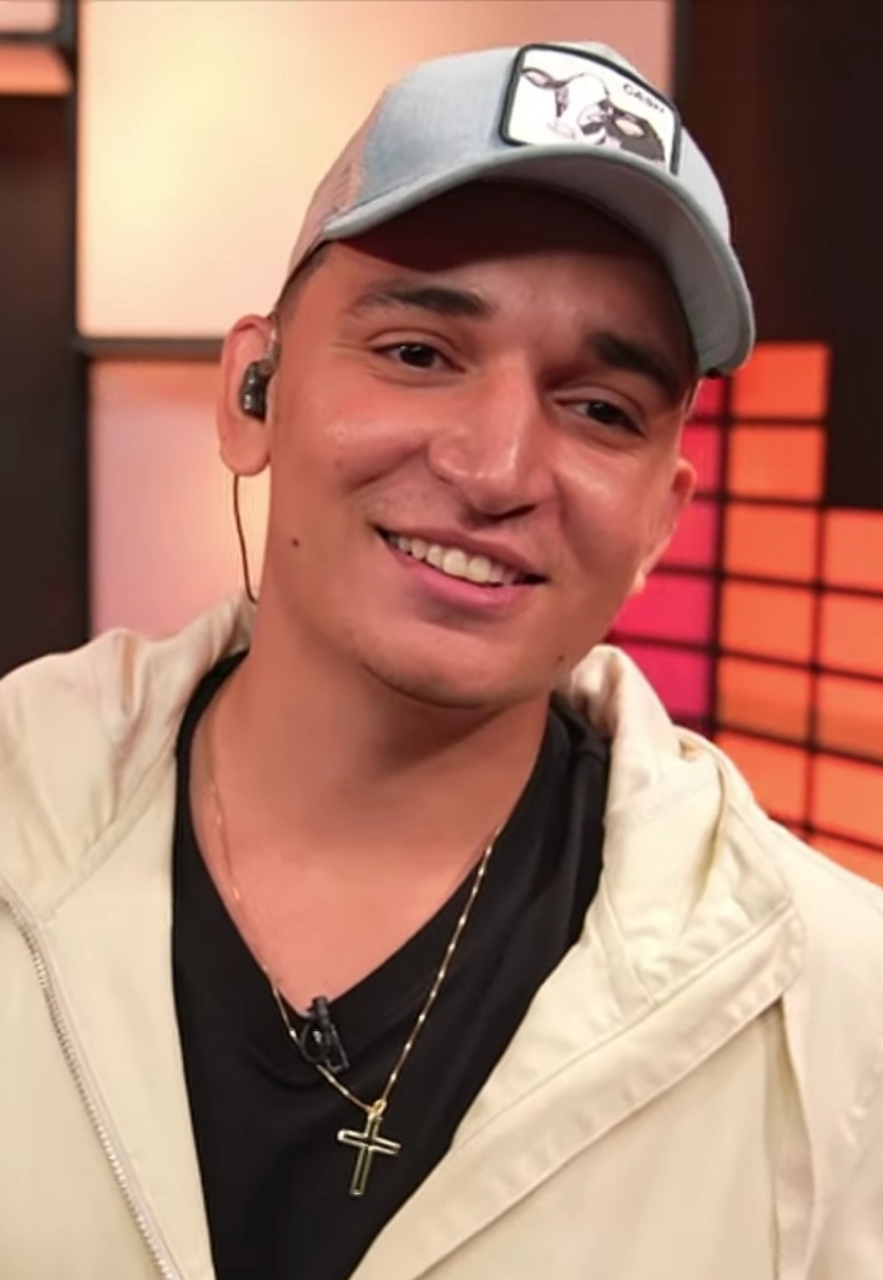
- Gomes in 2024

Background information
- Born: João Fernando Gomes Valério; 31 July 2002 (age 24); Serrita, Pernambuco, Brazil
- Origin: Petrolina, Pernambuco, Brazil
- Genres: Forró
- Occupations: Singer; songwriter
- Instrument: Voice
- Years active: 2021–present
- Label: Sua Música (2021–present)

João Fernando Gomes Valério (born 31 July 2002) is a Brazilian singer and songwriter who came to national prominence with his debut album Eu tenho a senha. One song from the album, "Meu Pedaço de Pecado", was the most played song among Brazil's Spotify users as of 1 July 2021, and also appeared in Spotify's Top 50 Global chart the same month.

== Biography ==
Gomes was born in Serrita, Pernambuco, the son of a barber and a farmer. His middle name, Fernando, is a tribute to an uncle who was a cowboy, following the tradition of passing a cowboy’s name to a newborn relative as a way of inheriting the courage, bravery, and skill of the deceased.

At a young age, he moved to Petrolina with his family, where he sang in the church choir from the age of seven. In 2019, while studying animal agriculture at the Federal Institute of Pernambuco, he began to record videos and publish them online, garnering some popularity.

His debut album, Eu tenho a senha, was released in June 2021 and reached #40 on the Billboard Global 200.

The following month, the first track from the album, "Meu Pedaço de Pecado", reached the top position on Spotify's "50 most played in Brazil" playlist, and also appeared in the platform's Top 50 Global playlist. At the 2021 Multishow Awards, Gomes was nominated for the New Artist award, while "Meu Pedaço de Pecado" was nominated for the Hit of the Year award.

Gomes sings in the forró genre, drawing inspiration from Serrita's cowboy culture.

His first DVD was recorded in Recife on August 17, 2022. The concert took place at Marco Zero and featured special appearances by Vanessa da Mata, rapper L7nnon, and Fagner. The performance drew 150,000 people.

On September 5, João Gomes performed for the first time at the Rock in Rio festival, one of the largest music festivals in the world.

In September 2023, he became the first piseiro singer to be nominated for a Latin Grammy, in the category of Best Portuguese Language Roots Album, with the album Raiz. In September 2024, he was nominated again in the same category, with the album De Norte a Sul. In 2025, he received another nomination in the same category, with the album Dominguinho, an award he won.

João Gomes was responsible for launching NPR’s international Tiny Desk program in Brazil. The inaugural episode aired on October 7, 2025, featuring an approximately twenty-minute performance by João with his band.

João Gomes sings in the forró genre, drawing inspiration from the cowboy culture of Pernambuco. He cites Luiz Gonzaga, Belchior, and Cartola as his influences.

== Discography ==
=== Studio albums ===
Title	Album details
Eu Tenho a Senha	Released: 2021; Format: Digital download, streaming; Label: Independent
Digo Ou Não Digo	Released: 2022; Format: Digital download, streaming; Label: Independent
RAIZ	Released: 2023; Format: Digital download, streaming; Label: Independent
De Norte a Sul	Released: 2023; Format: Digital download, streaming; Label: Independent
Vaquejada Tá na Moda	Released: 2024; Format: Digital download, streaming; Label: Independent
Dominguinho	Released: 2025; Format: Digital download, streaming; Label: Independent

=== Live albums ===
Title	Album details
Acredite (Ao Vivo)	Released: 2022; Format: Digital download, streaming
Do Jeito Que O Povo Gosta	Released: 2025; Format: Digital download, streaming
Meu Piseiro Brasileiro	Released: 2026; Format: Digital download, streaming
Dominguinho Vol. 2 (Ao Vivo)	Released: 2026; Format: Digital download, streaming

=== Singles ===
- "Meu Pedaço de Pecado" (2021)
- "Se For Amor" (with Vitor Fernandes) (2021)
- "Eu Tenho a Senha" (2021)
- "Dois Lados" (2024)
- "Poucas Palavras" (2024)
