= Pisadinha =

Music genre originating in Bahia, Brazil

- Stylistic origins: Xote, tecnomelody, lambada, forró eletrônico
- Cultural origins: 2000s, Bahia

Subgenres
- Piseiro

Pisadinha is a musical genre that emerged in the state of Bahia.

The musical style emerged in the city of Monte Santo in the 2000s. Pisadinha is thus characterized by the simplicity of the union of the electronic keyboard with the voice, played on the walls (large sound structures).

The first artist to achieve national relevance with the step was singer Gusttavo Lima in 2013. Two years later, an Internet meme known as the "Human Guitar" was responsible for the expansion of the genre. In 2019, the genre was on the rise due to the high production and popularity of songs in the genre, due to the ease of production and nostalgia caused by the electronic elements of the style; Soon the style caught the attention of well-known artists, such as Wesley Safadão and Xand Avião. Safadão has supported the dissemination of pisadinha, including some songs of the rhythm in shows.

== Piseiro ==
Piseiro is a variation of pisadinha that emerged in the state of Bahia, derived from forró.

According to Folha de S.Paulo, piseiro can be described as "a descendant of forró with aesthetic objectives aligned with current funk".

The piseiro has traces of the pisadinha, presenting a choreography marked by shuffling steps and hands positioned close to the body. This derivation of traditional forró has faster beats, offering a solo dance. The name "piseiro" derives from the name of the place where the pisodinha is danced.

Some of the names considered responsible for the piseiro's success are Os Barões da Pisadinha and Vitor Fernandes. Born in Petrolina, Fernandes began his professional career in March 2019, a few months later performing 20 shows per month. His music video "Roxinho" currently has almost 50 million views on YouTube.
