= Wesley Safadão =

Brazilian singer and businessman

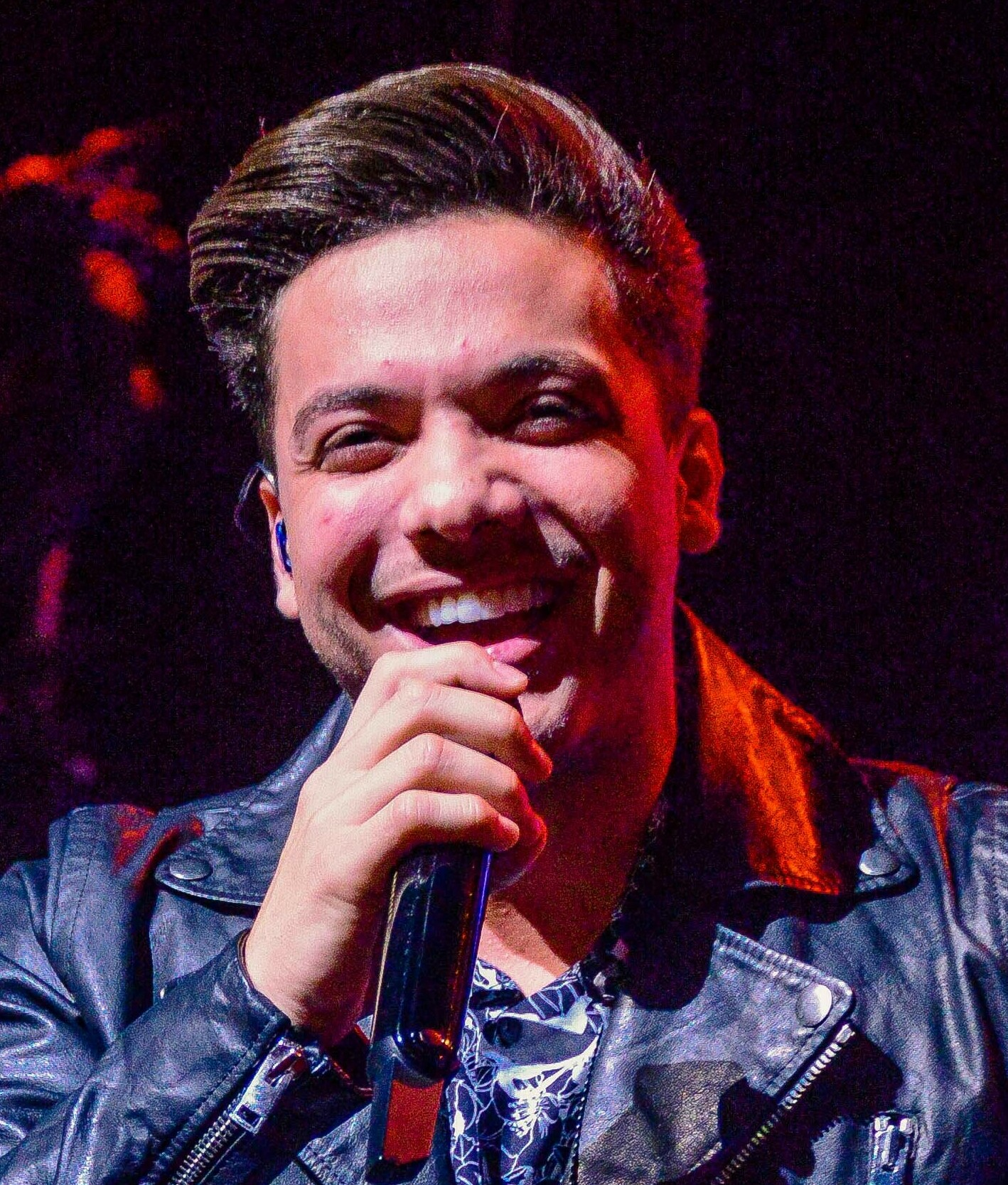
- Safadão in 2017

Background information
- Also known as: Safadão, WS
- Born: Wesley Oliveira da Silva; 6 September 1988 (age 37); Fortaleza, Ceará, Brazil
- Genres: Forró, axé, arrocha, Piseiro
- Occupations: Singer-songwriter; businessman
- Instrument: Vocals
- Years active: 2003–present
- Label: Som Livre
- Website: WesleySafadao.com.br

Wesley Oliveira da Silva (6 September 1988), also known as Wesley Safadão, is a Brazilian singer, songwriter, producer and businessman.

He began singing at the age of fifteen, and began his professional career by joining a family band: Garota Safada. As of 2007, it became popular in the northeast region and in 2015 with the hit "Camarote" it reached national success along with his first solo album: Ao Vivo em Brasilia. In his solo career, he released more hit songs such as "Coração Machucado", "Meu Coração Deu Pt", "Ninguém É de Ferro", "Air Conditioning no 15", "Aquele 1%" and "Você Partiu Meu Coração". Since its first national success, it has had one of the most expensive fees in Brazil.

== Discography ==
=== Studio albums ===
Year	Title	Format
2015	Wesley Safadão – Ao Vivo em Brasília: Released: 2015; Label: Som Livre	Live

=== Videography ===
Year	Title	Format
2015	Ao Vivo em Brasília: Released: 2015; Label: Som Livre	Live

=== Singles ===
- "Camarote" (2015)
- "Parece Que o Vento" feat. Ivete Sangalo (2015)
- "Coração Machucado" (2016)
- "Solteiro de Novo" feat. Ronaldinho Gaúcho (2016)
- "Meu Coração deu PT" feat. Matheus & Kauan (2016)
- "Ninguém é de Ferro" feat. Marília Mendonça (2017)
- "Ressaca de Saudade" (2017)
- "Ar Condicionado no 15" (2017)
- "Sonhei Que Tava Me Casando" (2017)
- "Romance com Safadeza" feat. Anitta (2018)
- "Só Pra Castigar" (2018)
- "Igual Ela, Só Uma" (2019)

=== Collaborations ===
- "Fim de Festa" with Saia Rodada (2008)
- "Nada Sou Sem Você" with Pisada de Bakana (2009)
- "Playboyzinho Da Facu" with Forró Estourado (2010)
- "Homem Mudado" with Banda Santroppê (2010)
- "O Verão Chegou" with Forró di Taipa (2010)
- "Balada" with Novo Balancear (2011)
- "Quando Eu Parar de Ligar" with Banda Rabo de Vaca (2011)
- "Empinadinha" with Léo Santana (Parangolé) (2012)
- "Solte o Som do Paredão" with Forró dos Balas (2012)
- "Tô Pensando em Você" with Forró Esfregue Dance (2012)
- "Ninguém Vive Sem Amor" with Forró Boca A Boca (2012)
- "A Gente Já Rola" with Simone & Simaria (2012)
- "Sou Forrozeiro" with Pegada de Luxo (2012)
- "Nem de Graça Quero Seu Amor" with Forró da Curtição (2012)
- "Fatos e Relatos" with Caviar Com Rapadura (2012)
- "100% Amor" with Alinne Rosa (Cheiro de Amor) (2012)
- "Tentativas Em Vão" with Bruno & Marrone (2012)
- "Só Sei Te Amar" with Bruno & Marrone (2012)
- "Sou Outra Pessoa" with Dorgival Dantas (2012)
- "É Só Chegar e Beijar" with DJ João Brasil (2012)
- "Pede Pra Mim" with Forró do Chefão (2012)
- "Caranguejo" with Toca do Vale (2012)
- "Nheco Nheco" with Forró do Movimento (2012)
- "Vai Querendo" with Forró da Curtição (2013)
- "Em Outras Palavras" with Forró 100% (2013)
- "Amor Errado" with Banda Magníficos (2013)
- "Sintomas de Amor" with Filhinho de Papai (2013)
- "Senta Ana Tereza" with Bota Pra Moer (2013)
- "Pancadão Frenético" with Claudia Leitte (2013)
- "Sua Linda" with Lucas Lucco (2014)
- "Sou Ciumento Mesmo" with Fernando & Sorocaba (2014)
- "iDento" with PP Júnior and Chicabana (2014)
- "Tó Sou Seu" with Fred & Gustavo (2014)
- "Mal Acompanhado" with Forró da Curtição (2014)
- "Ah, Tá Sofrendo" with Humberto & Ronaldo (2014)
- "Eu Vou Pagar Pra Ver" with Xand (Aviões do Forró) (2014)
- "Sofrência" with Forró do Movimento (2014)
- "Gelo Na Balada" with Cavaleiros do Forró (2014)
- "Sino de Belém" with Michel Teló (2014)
- "Solteiro Desapegado" with Cleber & Cauan (2014)
- "Agora Me Curei" with Simone & Simaria (2015)
