= Espaço Unimed =

Multipurpose indoor entertainment venue in São Paulo, Brazil

- Interactive map of Espaço Unimed
- Former names: Espaço das Américas (2002–2021)
- Address: Rua Tagipuru, 795; São Paulo; Brazil
- Location: Barra Funda
- Coordinates: 23.5269°S 46.6666°W
- Operator: Espaço Unimed
- Capacity: 8,000

Construction
- Opened: September 2002

Website
- espacounimed.com.br

Espaço Unimed, formerly known as Espaço das Américas from 2002 to 2022, is a multipurpose indoor entertainment venue in the Barra Funda district of São Paulo, Brazil. It has a maximum capacity of approximately 8,000 people across a usable area of roughly 3,450 square meters. The venue hosts concerts by Brazilian and international artists, as well as comedy shows, television productions, corporate events and other performances.

It was renamed Espaço Unimed in May 2022, coinciding with its 20th anniversary, following a naming rights agreement between Unimed and Grupo São Paulo Eventos, the company that owns and operates the venue.

== History ==
Espaço das Américas opened in 2002 and is owned by Grupo São Paulo Eventos, a company with more than 50 years of experience in the entertainment industry, which also operates other well-known São Paulo venues such as Olympia, Toco, Contramão and Overnight, as well as Expo Barra Funda and Villa Country. The venue is run by businessmen Alejandro Figueroa and Marco Antônio Tobal, who are also responsible for the Villa Country concert hall.

In 2011, the venue underwent a renovation that expanded its capacity to 8,000 people, and it reopened on December 4, 2012, with a performance by singer Roberto Carlos.

In May 2022, coinciding with the venue's 20th anniversary, Grupo São Paulo Eventos entered into a naming rights agreement with health insurance provider Unimed, under which the venue was renamed Espaço Unimed; the deal was reported to run for five years, with an option for renewal, though the financial terms were not disclosed. It was the first time in the venue's history that it had taken on a sponsor's name, and the deal followed Unimed's earlier sponsorship of the Teatro Unimed, which had opened in 2019 in the Jardins district.

Over the years, the venue has hosted numerous Brazilian and international artists, including Jão, Ivete Sangalo, Los Hermanos, Criolo, Emicida, Morrissey, Noel Gallagher, Titãs, and Robert Plant, among others, as well as Queens of the Stone Age, Deep Purple and Pitbull.

== Architecture and facilities ==
Espaço Unimed is located at Rua Tagipuru, 795, in the Barra Funda district, close to the Barra Funda metro and CPTM station, which is frequently cited as a key access point for the venue. The venue occupies a usable area of approximately 3,450 square meters and offers a flexible configuration, allowing it to be adapted for standing-room concerts, seated theater-style events, and corporate or institutional functions. Its maximum capacity is approximately 8,000 people.

== Reception ==
Since opening in 2002, the venue has hosted more than 1,000 shows and drawn an estimated 4 million attendees, according to figures published by Unimed at the time of the naming rights announcement. It has hosted performers across many genres, from international pop and rock acts to major Brazilian MPB, sertanejo and samba artists.

== Noted performers ==
- A-ha
- Anavitória
- Armin van Buuren
- Bad Religion
- Caetano Veloso
- Criolo
- Djavan
- Emicida
- Hanson
- Helloween
- Hozier
- Incubus
- Ivete Sangalo
- Jão
- Jorge Drexler
- Joss Stone
- Liam Gallagher
- Los Hermanos
- Louis Tomlinson
- Måneskin
- Megadeth
- Morrissey
- Nightwish
- Noel Gallagher
- Os Paralamas do Sucesso
- Paramore
- Robert Plant
- Roberto Carlos
- Rosalía
- Slash
- Tears for Fears
- The Kooks
- Tiësto
- Titãs
- Whindersson Nunes
