= Idiota (Jão song) =

2022 single by Jão

- Cover of the Spanish version with Danna Paola

Single by Jão

from the album Pirata
- Language: Brazilian Portuguese
- Released: 9 February 2022
- Studio: Toca do Lobo (São Paulo)
- Genre: Pop
- Length: 3:02
- Label: Universal
- Composers: Jão; Pedro Tófani; Zebu
- Producers: Jão; Zebu

Jão singles chronology
"Fugitivos" (2021)	"Idiota" (2022)	"Sim" (2022)

Music video
- "Idiota" on YouTube

"Idiota" (English: "Idiot") is a song by the Brazilian singer-songwriter Jão from his third studio album Pirata (2021). The song was written by Jão, Pedro Tófani, and Zebu, and was produced by Jão and Zebu. It was released as the third and final single from the album on 9 February 2022.

Commercially, the song peaked at number 23 on the Billboard's Brazil Songs, while in Portugal, it peaked at number 17. Tófani directed the song's music video. It was nominated for Best Portuguese Language Song at the 23rd Annual Latin Grammy Awards. It also earned two nominations at the 2022 Multishow Brazilian Music Award. A Spanish version with Mexican singer Danna Paola was released on 2 October 2023.

== Background and release ==
On 13 October 2021, Jão announced his third studio album Pirata. The singer announced the tracklist of the album on 18 October; "Idiota" appears as the third track. The album was released the following day, on 19 October. The song received a lyric video on 28 October. In December 2021, "Idiota" went viral in videos on TikTok. This quickly caused a massive spike in the song's streams, and on 9 February 2022, it was released as the album's third single. A Spanish version with the Mexican singer Danna Paola was released on 2 October 2023.

== Music video ==
Pedro Tófani directed the music video for "Idiota", which was shot on January 27, 2022. On February 3, 2022, Jão announced the release of the music video for the song. It premiered via Jão's channel on YouTube on February 9, 2022. The video includes references to movies such as Titanic, Brokeback Mountain, 10 Things I Hate About You, Spider-Man, and Dona Flor and Her Two Husbands, as well as the couple Ayrton Senna and Xuxa.

== Live performances ==
On 29 October 2021, Jão performed "Idiota" in a pre-recorded video published on his YouTube channel. He performed the song in a livestream show on TikTok on 16 November. He performed the song on Encontro com Fátima Bernardes on 29 November 2021, and again 21 June 2022. He sang the song on Faustão na Band on 24 March 2022. On 21 April 2022, Jão performed the song on TVZ. He played "Idiota" on Altas Horas on 21 May 2022, and again 28 January 2023. At the MTV MIAW Awards on 26 July 2022, he performed the song with Skank. On 13 September 2022, Jão performed the song on Música Boa Ao Vivo. On 10 October 2022, he performed the song as part of a mini-concert titled the "Rolling Stone Sessions", promoted by Rolling Stone Brasil. He presented the song at the Multishow Brazilian Music Award on 18 October 2022. Jão also performed the song at the 23rd Annual Latin Grammy Awards premiere ceremony on 17 November 2022. On 8 December 2022, he published a Vevo Location performance of the song on his YouTube channel. He sang the song on Fantástico on 12 March 2023. "Idiota" was included on the set list on two of Jão's tours—Turnê Pirata and SuperTurnê.

== Accolades ==
Awards and nominations for "Idiota"
Organization	Year	Category	Result	Ref.
SEC Awards	2022	Song of the Year	Nominated	
SEC Awards	2022	Music Video of the Year	Nominated	
MTV MIAW Awards Brazil	2022	Anthem of the Year	Nominated	
MTV MIAW Awards Brazil	2022	Awesome Music Video	Nominated	
MTV MIAW Awards Brazil	2022	Karaoke Anthem	Nominated	
Multishow Brazilian Music Award	2022	Hit of the Year	Nominated	
Multishow Brazilian Music Award	2022	TVZ Music Video of the Year	Nominated	
Trends Brasil Conference	2022	Best Single	Won	
Latin Grammy Awards	2022	Best Portuguese Language Song	Nominated	
BreakTudo Awards	2022	Brazilian Music Video	Nominated	
Capricho Awards	2022	National Hit of the Year	Nominated	

== Credits and personnel ==
Credits are adapted from the liner notes of Pirata.

- Jão – vocals, background vocals, songwriter, producer
- Pedro Tófani – songwriter
- Zebu – songwriter, producer, keyboards, bass, drum programming, guitar
- Andre Jordão – guitar
- Will Bone – brass
- Rafael Fadul – mixing
- Chris Gehringer – mastering

== Charts ==
=== Weekly charts ===
Weekly chart performance for "Idiota"
Chart (2022)	Peak position
Brazil (Billboard)	23
Brazil Airplay (Crowley Charts)	85
Brazil National Pop Airplay (Crowley Charts)	2
Portugal (AFP)	17

=== Monthly charts ===
Monthly chart performance for "Idiota"
Chart (2022)	Peak position
Brazil Streaming (Pro-Música Brasil)	24

=== Year-end charts ===
2022 year-end chart performance for "Idiota"
Chart (2022)	Position
Brazil Streaming (Pro-Música Brasil)	72
Portugal (AFP)	51

== Certifications ==
Certifications for "Idiota"
Region	Certification	Certified units/sales
Brazil (Pro-Música Brasil)	2× Diamond	600,000^{‡}
Portugal (AFP)	Platinum	10,000^{‡}
^{‡} Sales+streaming figures based on certification alone.
