= Latin Grammy Award for Best Portuguese Language Song =

Latin Grammy award category

- Awarded for: A song must contain at least 51% of the lyrics in Portuguese and must be a new song.
- Country: United States
- Presented by: The Latin Recording Academy
- First award: 2000
- Currently held by: Liniker for "Veludo Marrom" (2025)
- Website: latingrammy.com

The Latin Grammy Award for Best Portuguese Language Song is an honor presented annually at the Latin Grammy Awards, a ceremony that recognizes excellence and creates a wider awareness of the cultural diversity and contributions of Latin recording artists in the United States and internationally.

According to the category description guide for the 13th Latin Grammy Awards, the award is for "a song must contain at least 51% of the lyrics in Portuguese and must be a new song. Award to the Songwriter(s). Not Eligible: Instrumental recordings and cover songs."

The award was first presented to Djavan for "Acelerou" in 2000. The only songwriter who has won this award more than once is Milton Nascimento, who won twice consecutively in 2003 and 2004. In 2013, "Esse Cara Sou Eu" by Roberto Carlos and "Um Abraçaço" by Caetano Veloso became the first songs in the category to be nominated for Song of the Year. In 2014, "A Bossa Nova É Foda" by Caetano Veloso was nominated for Song of the Year. From 2000 to 2015, the award category was presented as Best Brazilian Song and was changed to its current name in 2016.

== Winners and nominees ==
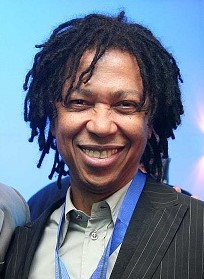
Two-time winner Djavan.

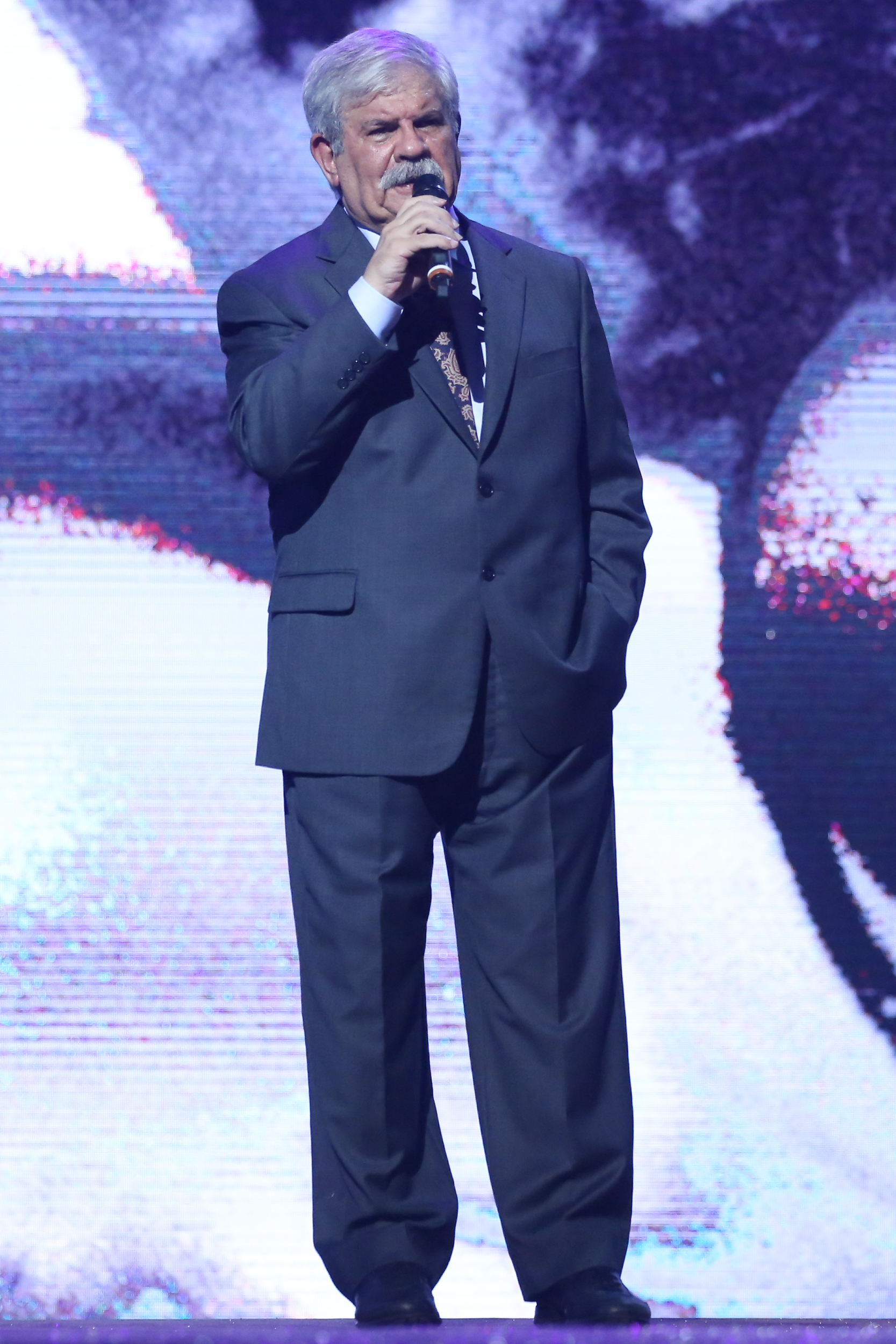
2002 winner Dori Caymmi.

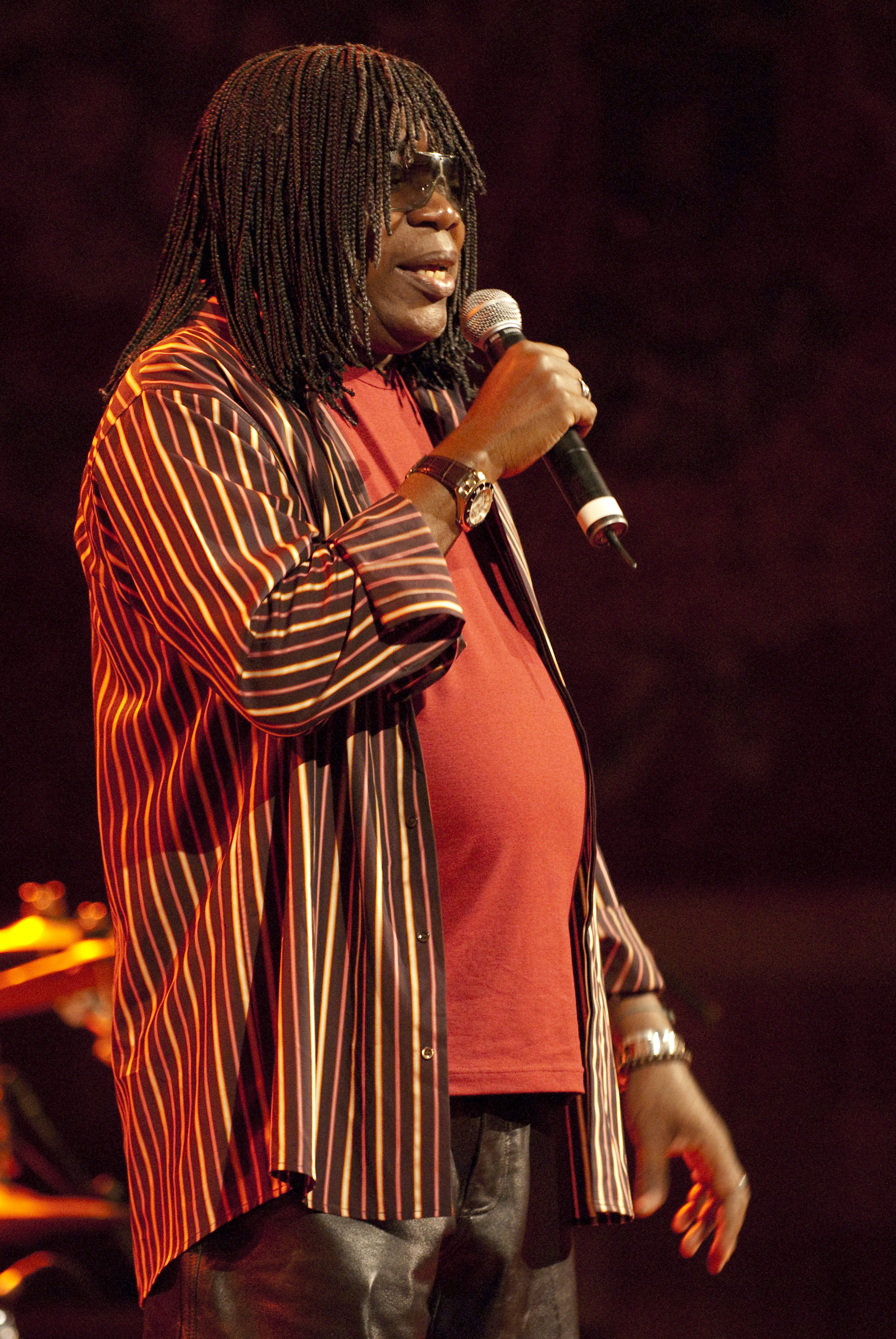
Two-time winner Milton Nascimento.

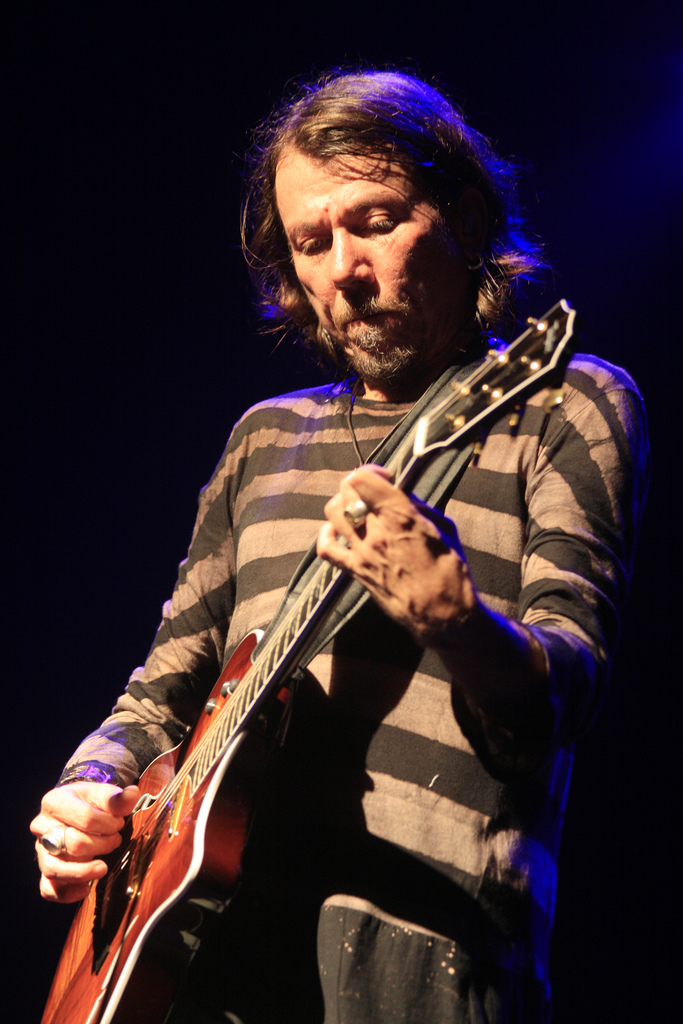
Two-time winner Lenine.

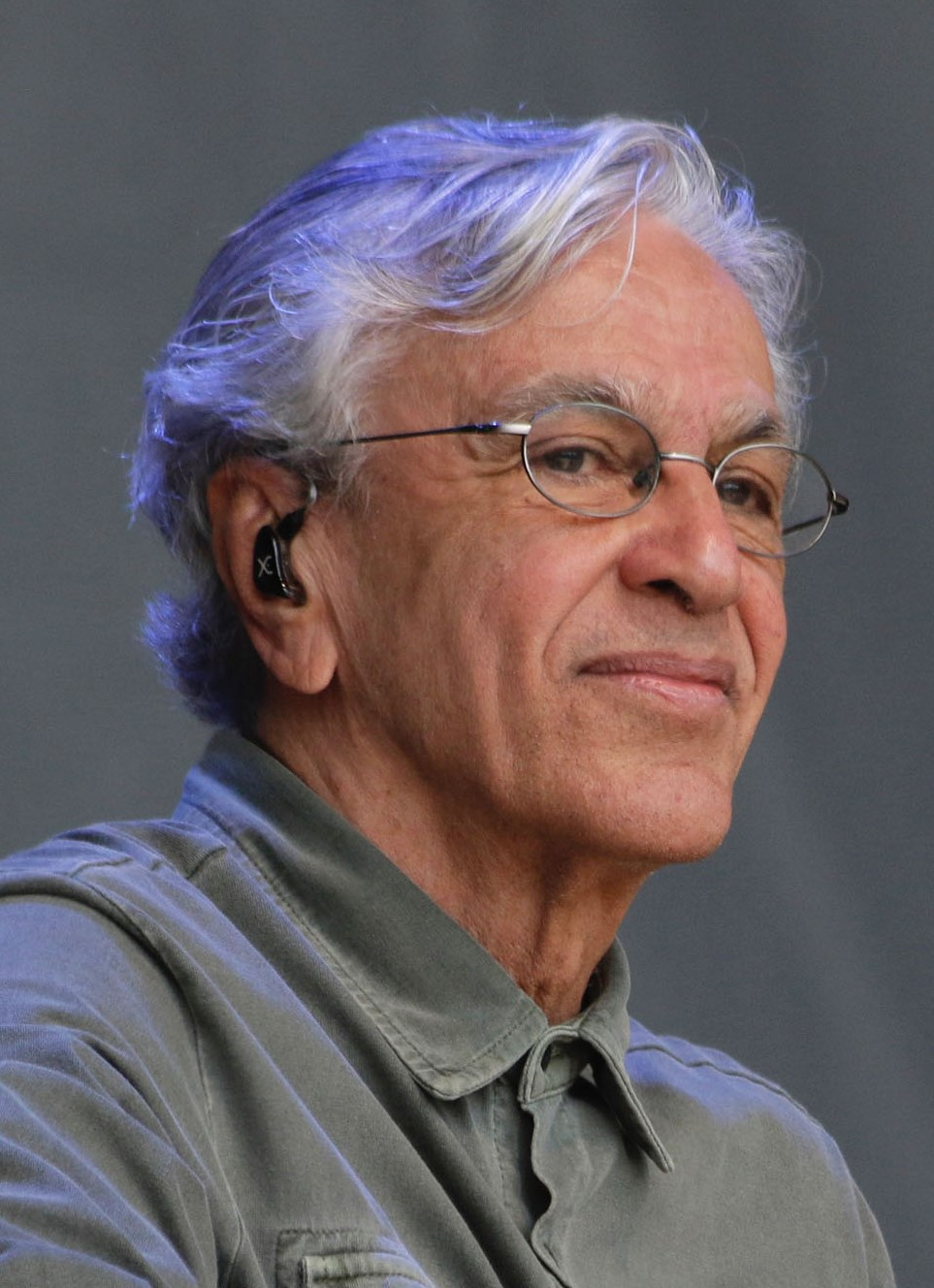
Two-time winner Caetano Veloso.

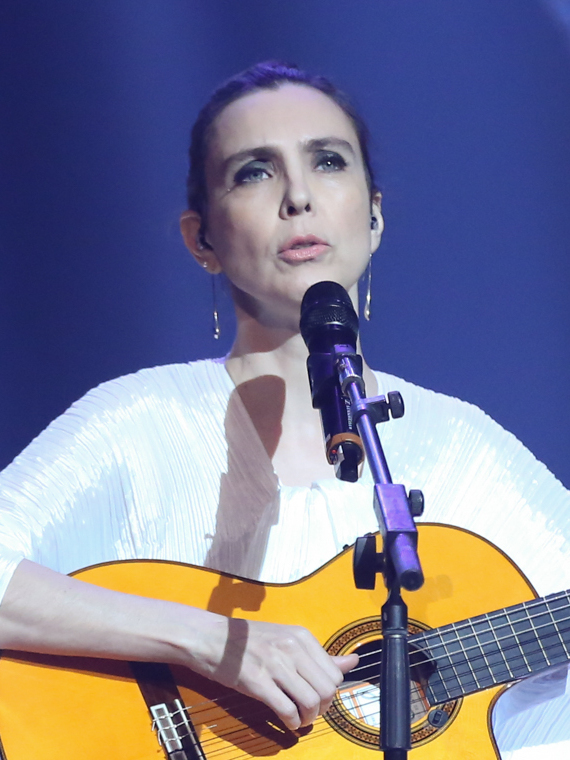
2010 winner Adriana Calcanhotto.

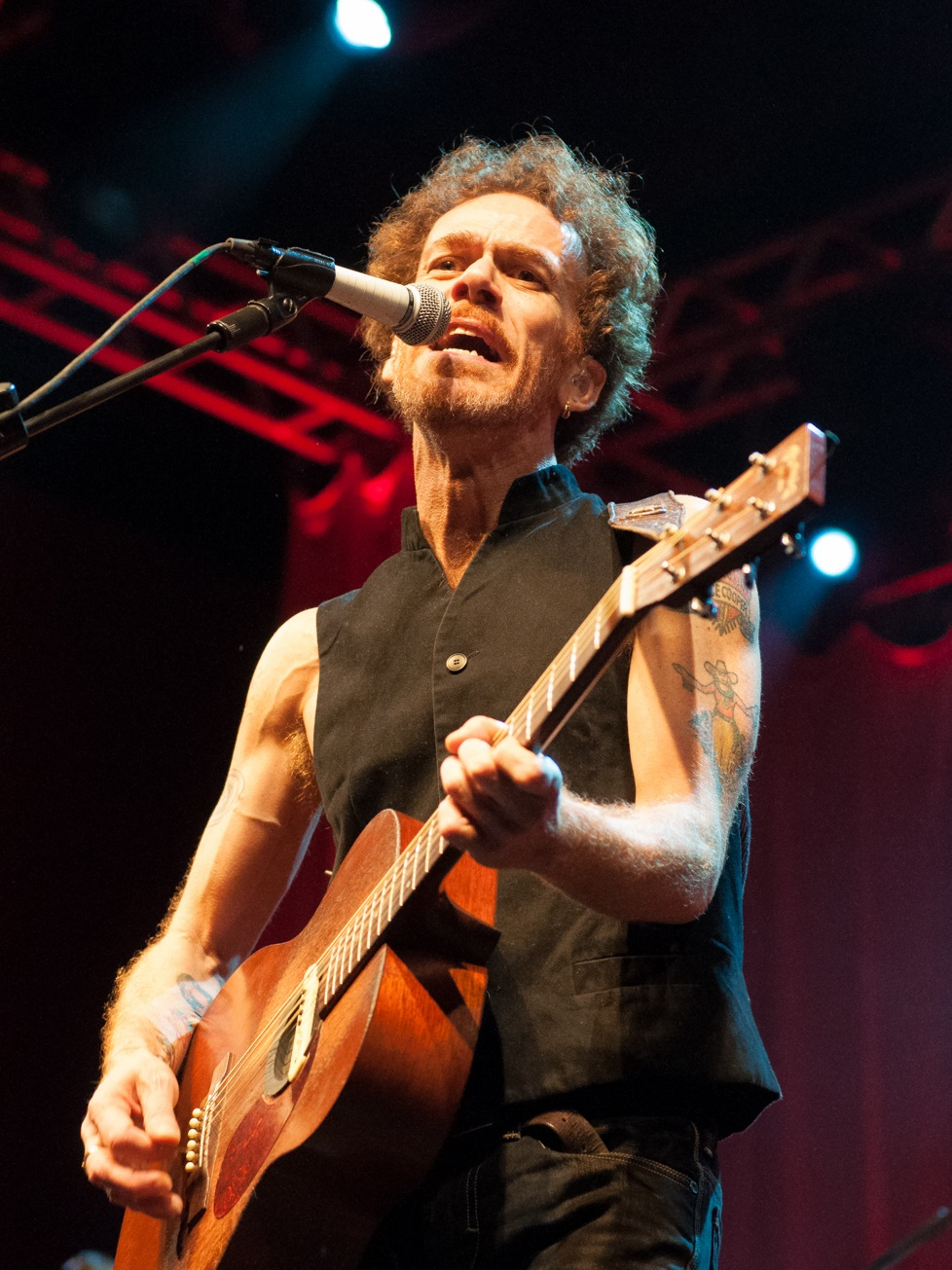
2011 winner Nando Reis.

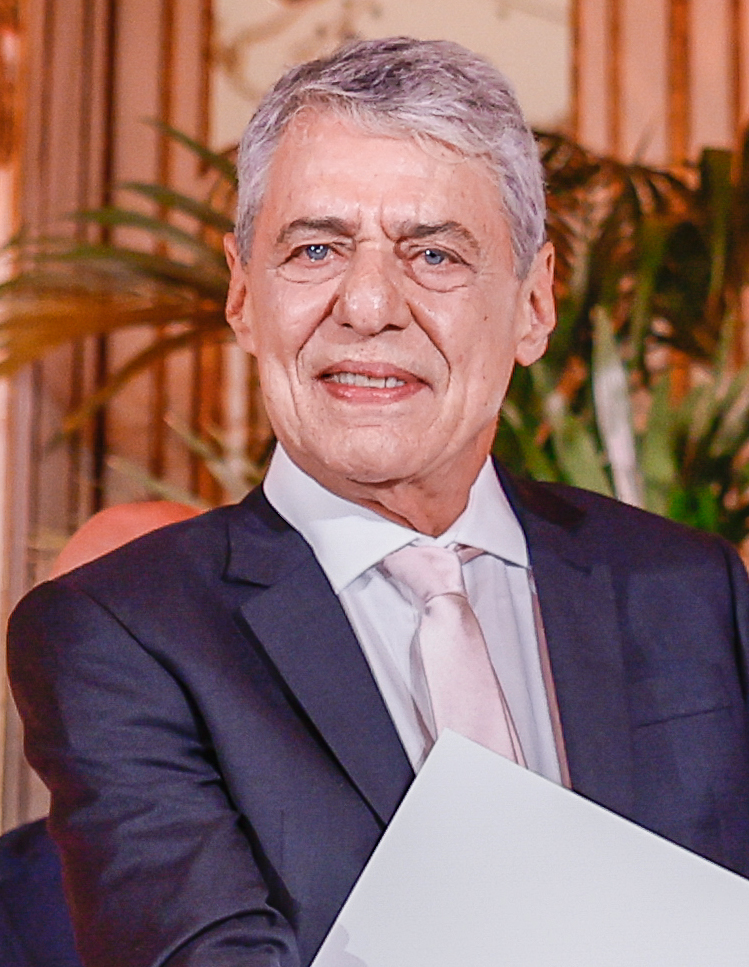
Two-time winner Chico Buarque.

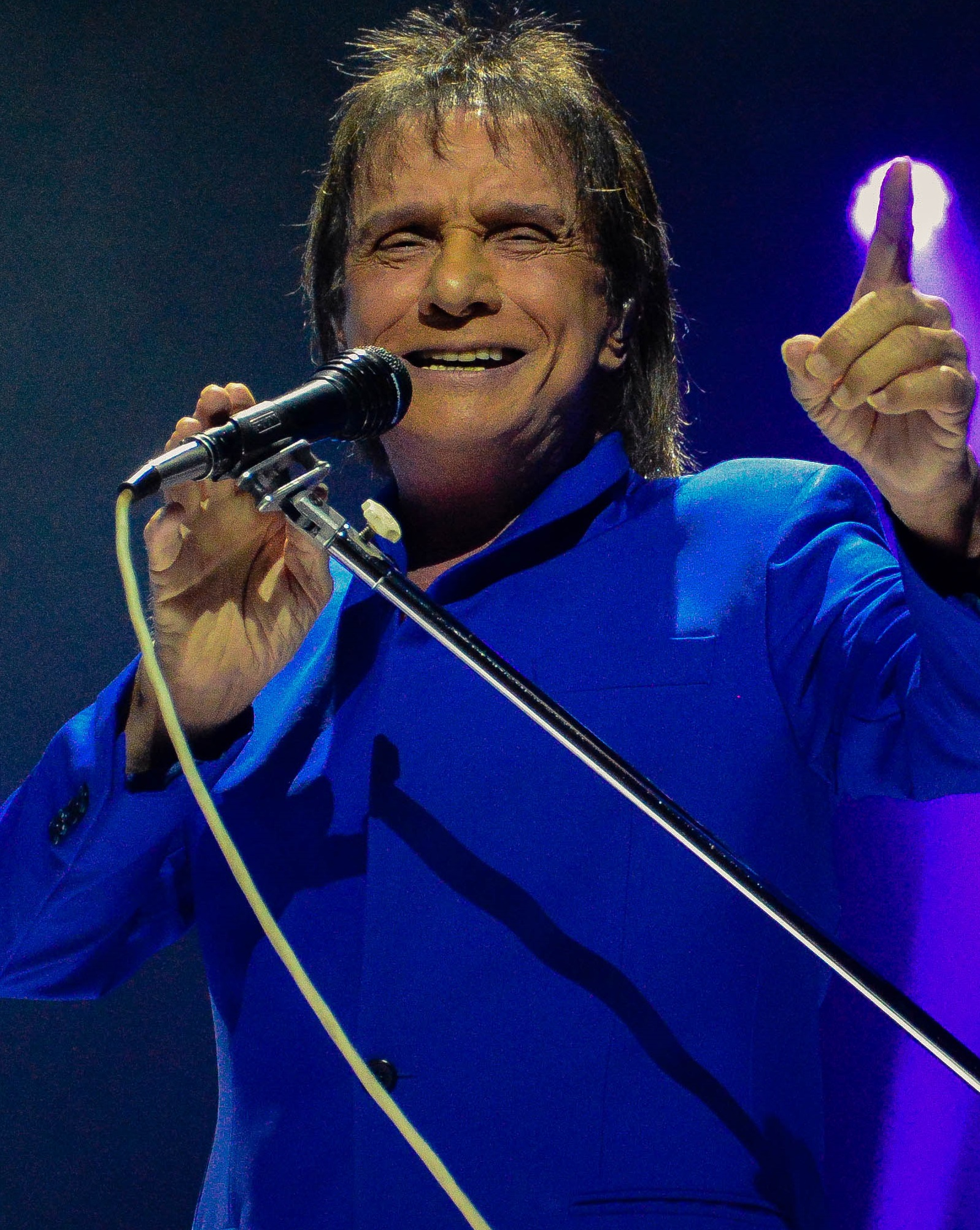
2013 winner Roberto Carlos.

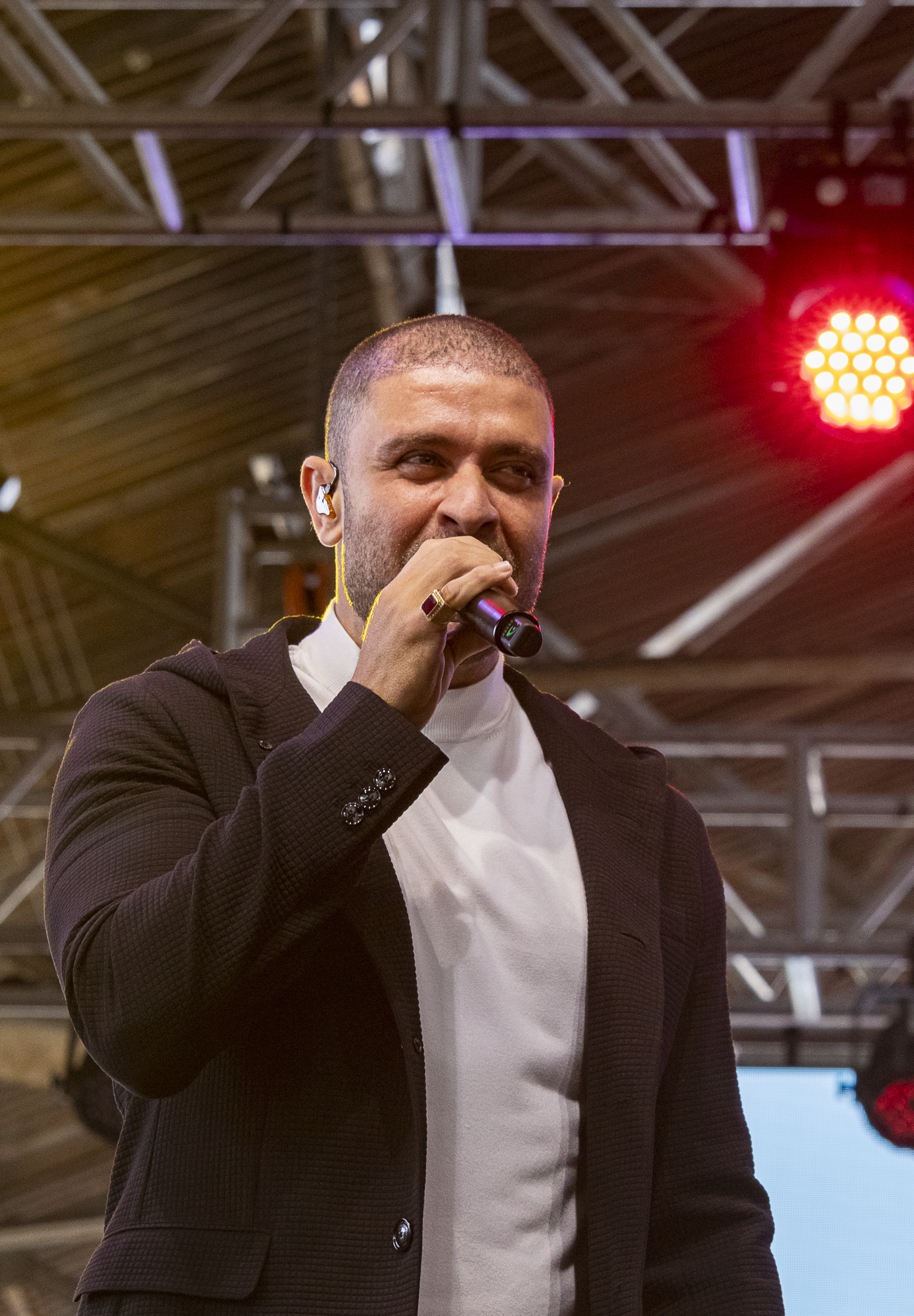
2015 winner Diogo Nogueira.

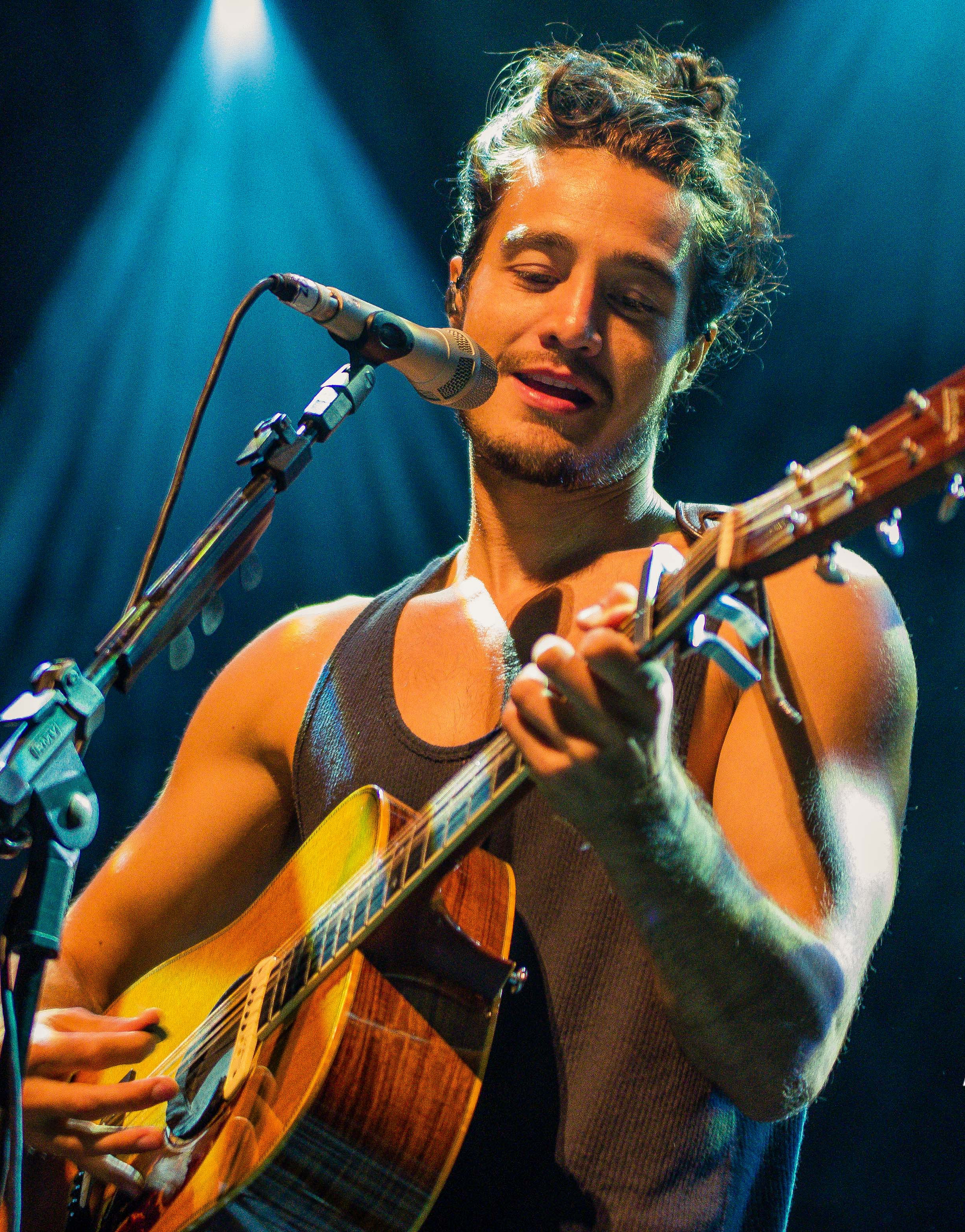
Three-time winner Tiago Iorc.

| Year | Songwriter(s) | Work | Performing artist(s) | Nominees | Ref. |
|---|---|---|---|---|---|
| 2000 | Djavan | "Acelerou" | Djavan | Chico César and Vanessa da Mata – "A Forca que Nunca Seca" (Maria Bethânia); Marcelo Camelo – "Anna Julia" (Los Hermanos); Nando Reis – "O Segundo Sol" (Cássia Eller); Cristovão Bastos and Aldir Blanc – "Suave Veneno" (Nana Caymmi) | |
| 2001 | Raimundinho do Accordion, Targino Gondim and Manuca | "Esperando Na Janela" | Gilberto Gil | Herbert Vianna – "A Lua Q Eu T Dei" (Ivete Sangalo); Carlinhos Brown and Marisa Monte – "Amor I Love You" (Marisa Monte); Caetano Veloso – "Sou Seu Sabiá" (Caetano Veloso); Caetano Veloso – "Zera A Reza" (Caetano Veloso) | |
| 2002 | Dori Caymmi and Paulo César Pinheiro | "Saudade De Amar" | Nana Caymmi | Celso Fonseca and Ronaldo Bastos – "A Voz Do Coracao" (Celso Fonseca and Ronaldo Bastos); Arnaldo Antunes and Pepeu Gomes – "Alma" (Zélia Duncan); Eri do Cais and Serginho Meriti – "Deixa A Vida Me Levar" (Zeca Pagodinho); Riachao – "Va Morar Com O Diabo" (Cássia Eller) | |
| 2003 | Milton Nascimento and Telo Borges | "Tristesse" | Milton Nascimento and Maria Rita Mariano | Herbert Vianna – "Cuide Bem Do Seu Amor" (Os Paralamas do Sucesso); Arnaldo Antunes, Carlinhos Brown and Marisa Monte – "Já Sei Namorar" (Tribalistas); Chico Amaral – "Pietá" (Milton Nascimento); Jorge Mautner – "Todo Errado" (Caetano Veloso and Jorge Mautner) | |
| 2004 | Milton Nascimento | "A Festa" | Maria Rita | Maluca Joyce – "A Banda" (Joyce and Banda Maluca); Roberto de Carvalho, Arnaldo Jabor and Rita Lee – "Amor e Sexo" (Rita Lee); Lô Borges, Nando Reis and Samuel Rosa – "Dois Rios" (Skank); Roberto Carlos – "Pra Sempre" (Roberto Carlos); Lucas, Fernando Mendes and José Wilson – "Você Não Me Ensinou A Te Esquecer" (Caetano Veloso) | |
| 2005 | Lenine and Ivan Santos | "Ninguém Faz Idéia" | Lenine | Francis Hime and Olivia Hime – "Canção Transparente" (Olivia Hime); José Miguel Wisnik – "Ponte Aérea" (Eveline Hecker); Totonho Villeroy – "São Sebastião" (Totonho Villeroy) | |
| 2006 | Rodrigo Maranhão | "Caminho das Águas" | Maria Rita | Gigi – "Abalou" (Ivete Sangalo); Gilberto Gil – "Balé De Berlim" (Gilberto Gil); Arnaldo Antunes, Carlinhos Brown and Marisa Monte – "O Bonde do Dom" (Marisa Monte); Chico Buarque – "Ela Faz Cinema" (Chico Buarque) | |
| 2007 | Caetano Veloso | "Não Me Arrependo" | Caetano Veloso | Miro Almeida, Dória and Duller – "Berimbau Metalizado" (Ivete Sangalo); Simone Guimarães and Francis Hime – "Carta À Amiga Poeta" (Simone Guimarães); Arnaldo Antunes and Adriana Calcanhotto – "Para Lá" (Arnaldo Antunes); Antônio Villeroy – "Rosas" (Ana Carolina) | |
| 2008 | Marco Moraes and Soraya Moraes | "Som Da Chuva" | Soraya Moraes | Vanessa da Mata and Sérgio Mendes – "Acode" (Vanessa da Mata and Sérgio Mendes); Dudu Falcão – "Coisas Que Eu Sei" (Danni Carlos); Djavan – "Delírio Dos Mortais" (Djavan); Jota Maranhão and Jorge Vercillo – "Ela Une Todas As Coisas" (Jorge Vercillo) | |
| 2009 | Lenine | "Martelo Bigorna" | Lenine | Caetano Veloso – "A Cor Amarela" (Caetano Veloso); Gigi and Ivete Sangalo – "Agora Eu Já Sei" (Ivete Sangalo); Nando Reis – "Ainda Não Passou" (Nando Reis); Dadi, Seu Jorge and Marisa Monte – "Não É Proibido" (Marisa Monte) | |
| 2010 | Adriana Calcanhotto | "Tua" | Maria Bethânia | Jorge Vercillo – "Há de Ser" (Jorge Vercillo); Sérgio Santos – "Litoral e Interior" (Sérgio Santos); Dori Caymmi and Paulo César Pinheiro – "Quebra-Mar" (Dori Caymmi); Edu Lobo and Paulo César Pinheiro – "Tantas Marés" (Edu Lobo) | |
| 2011 | Nando Reis and Samuel Rosa | "De Repente" | Skank | Gigi, Dan Kambaiah, Fabinho O'Brian and Magno Sant'Anna – "Acelera Aê (Noite do Bem)" (Ivete Sangalo); Ná Ozzetti and Luiz Tatit – "Equilíbrio" (Ná Ozzetti); Adriana Calcanhotto – "Mais Perfumado" (Adriana Calcanhotto); Eliane Elias – "What About The Heart (Bate Bate)" (Eliane Elias) | |
| 2012 | Chico Buarque | "Querido Diário" | Chico Buarque | Pretinho Da Serrinha, Leandro Fab and Seu Jorge – "A Doida" (Seu Jorge); Antonio Dyggs and Sharon Axé Moi – "Ai Se Eu Te Pego" (Michel Teló); Arnaldo Antunes and Marisa Monte – "Ainda Bem" (Marisa Monte); Lenine and Ivan Santos – "Amor É Pra Quem Ama" (Lenine) | |
| 2013 | Roberto Carlos | "Esse Cara Sou Eu" | Roberto Carlos | Djavan – "Bangalô" (Djavan); Gilberto Gil – "Eu Descobri" (Gilberto Gil); Biquini Cavadão & Dudy – "Roda-Gigante" (Biquini Cavadão); Caetano Veloso – "Um Abraçaço" (Caetano Veloso); Arlindo Cruz, Gegê D'Angola and Julinho Santos – "Vai Embora Tristeza" (Arlindo Cruz); Joelson Castro and Felipe Salles – "Vem Me Completar" (Bruna & Keyla) | |
| 2014 | Caetano Veloso | "A Bossa Nova É Foda" | Caetano Veloso | Dori Caymmi and Paulo César Pinheiro – "Alguma Voz" (Dori Caymmi); Zeca Baleiro and Hyldon – "Calma Aí, Coração" (Zeca Baleiro); Maria Bethânia and Paulo César Pinheiro – "Carta de Amor" (Maria Bethânia); Vanessa da Mata – "Segue O Som" (Vanessa da Mata); Paula Fernandes – "Um Ser Amor" (Paula Fernandes); Anitta, Jefferson Junior and Umberto Tavares – "Zen" (Anitta) | |
| 2015 | Hamilton de Holanda, Diogo Nogueira and Marcos Portinari | "Bossa Negra" | Diogo Nogueira and Hamilton de Holanda | Bruno Boncini – "Diz Pra Mim" (Banda Malta); Mallu Magalhães – "Mais Ninguém" (Banda do Mar); Dudu Falcão and Lenine – "Simples Assim" (Lenine); Adriana Calcanhotto and Bebel Gilberto – "Tudo" (Bebel Gilberto) | |
| 2016 | Djavan | "Vidas Pra Contar" | Djavan | Tiago Iorc – "Amei Te Ver" (Tiago Iorc); Almir Sater, Paulo Simões and Renato Teixeira – "D de Destino" (Almir Sater and Renato Teixeira); Dani Black – "Maior" (Dani Black and Milton Nascimento); Douglas Germano – "Maria da Vila Matilde" (Elza Soares) | |
| 2017 | Ana Caetano and Tiago Iorc | "Trevo (Tu)" | Anavitória featuring Tiago Iorc | Marisa Monte, Silva and Lucas Silva – "Noturna (Nada de Novo Na Noite)" (Silva featuring Marisa Monte); Cauique, Diogo Leite and Rodrigo Leite – "Pé na Areia" (Diogo Nogueira); Nando Reis – "Só Posso Dizer" (Nando Reis); Andrei Kozyreff, Juliana Strassacapa, Sebastián Piracés-Ugarte, Mateo Piracés-Ugarte and Rafael Gomes da Silva – "Triste, Louca ou Má" (Francisco, el Hombre) | |
| 2018 | Chico Buarque | "As Caravanas" | Chico Buarque | Pedro Baby, Pretinho Da Serrinha and Tribalistas – "Aliança" (Tribalistas); Nanda Costa, Lan Lan and Sambê – "Aponte" (Maria Bethânia); Erasmo Carlos, Dadi and Marisa Monte – "Convite Para Nascer De Novo" (Erasmo Carlos); Lucas Cirillo and Xenia – "Pra Que Me Chamas?" (Xenia) | |
| 2019 | Tiago Iorc | "Desconstrução" | Tiago Iorc | Mestrinho – "Ansiosos Pra Viver" (Mestrinho); Criolo – "Etérea" (Criolo); Arnaldo Antunes and Claudia Brant – "Mil e Uma" (Claudia Brant featuring Arnaldo Antunes); Mário Laginha and João Monge – "Sem Palavras" (António Zambujo) | |
| 2020 | Francisco Bosco and João Bosco | "Abricó-de-Macaco" | João Bosco | Vitor Kley – "A Tal Canção Pra Lua (Microfonado)" (Vitor Kley & Samuel Rosa); Dj Duh, Emicida and Felipe Vassão – "Amarelo (Sample: Sujeito de Sorte - Belchior)" (Emicida featuring Majur & Pabllo Vittar); Russo Passapusso – "Libertação" (Elza Soares and BaianaSystem featuring Virgínia Rodrigues); Caetano Veloso – "Pardo" (Céu) | |
| 2021 | Ana Caetano and Paulo Novaes | "Lisboa" | Anavitória and Lenine | Jõão Pedro de Araújo Silva, Pedro Fonseca da Costa Silva, Marcos Mesmo, Francisco Ribeiro Eller, Luiz Ungarelli & Lucas Videla – "A Cidade" (Chico Chico and João Mantuano); Diogo Melim & Rodrigo Melim – "Amores e Flores" (Melim); Nando Reis – "Espera a Primavera" (Nando Reis); Tales De Polli & Deko – "Lágrimas de Alegria" (Maneva & Natiruts); Tiê Castro, Emicida & Guga Fernandes – "Mulheres Não Têm Que Chorar" (Ivete Sangalo & Emicida) | |
| 2022 | Marisa Monte and Jorge Drexler | "Vento Sardo" | Marisa Monte featuring Jorge Drexler | Liniker, Mahmundi, Tássia Reis & Tulipa Ruiz – "Baby 85" (Liniker); Jão, Pedro Tófani & Zebu – "Idiota" (Jão); Criolo & Tropkillaz – "Me Corte Na Boca Do Céu a Morte Não Pede" (Criolo featuring Milton Nascimento); Caetano Veloso – "Meu Coco" (Caetano Veloco); Iuri Rio Branco & Marina Sena – "Por Supuesto" (Marina Sena) | |
| 2023 | Tiago Iorc & Duda Rodrigues | "Tudo O Que A Fé Pode Tocar" | Tiago Iorc | Arnaldo Antunes, Criolo, Gabrieu, Keviin & Marcia Xavier – "Algoritmo Íntimo" (Criolo & Ney Matogrosso); Ronaldo Bastos & Chico César – "Do Acaso" (Alice Caymmi featuring Chico César); Djavan – "Num Mundo De Paz" (Djavan); Chico Buarque – "Que Tal um Samba?" (Chico Buarque featuring Hamilton de Holanda) | |
| 2024 | Jota.Pê | "Ouro Marrom" | Jota.Pê | Jão, Pedro Tófani & Zebu – "Alinhamento Milenar" (Jão); Junio Barreto – "Ata-me" (Alaíde Costa); Bruno Caliman, Carolzinha, Douglas Moda, Jenni Mosello & Luísa Sonza – "Chico" (Luísa Sonza); Criolo, Dino D'Santiago, Amaro Freitas & Nave – "Esperança" (Criolo, Dino D'Santiago & Amaro Freitas) | |
| 2025 | Liniker | "Veludo Marrom" | Liniker | Julia Mestre – "Maravilhosamente Bem" (Julia Mestre); Marina Sena – "Ouro De Tolo" (Marina Sena); Zé Ibarra – "Transe" (Zé Ibarra); Marcio Borges & Milton Nascimento – "Um Vento Passou (Para Paul Simon)" (Milton Nascimento & Esperanza Spalding featuring Paul Simon) | |
