= Multishow Brazilian Music Award for TVZ Music Video of the Year =

Brazilian music industry award

- Awarded for: Music videos
- Country: Brazil
- Presented by: Multishow
- First award: 2014
- Most recent winner: "Sua Boca Mente (You're Still the One)" – Zé Felipe and Ana Castela (2025)

Highlights
- Most awards: Anitta (7)
- Most nominations: Anitta (15)
- Website: Official website

The Multishow Brazilian Music Award for TVZ Music Video of the Year is an award given at the annual Multishow Brazilian Music Awards, a ceremony that was established in 1994 and originally called the TVZ Awards. The category was first presented in 2014 as Best TVZ Music Video to Luan Santana for the video "Te Esperando". A similar award for Best Music Video was awarded from 1994 to 2016.

Anitta is the most awarded and nominated artist in the category with seven wins from 15 nominations. She is followed by Luan Santana with four wins from seven nominations.

== Recipients ==
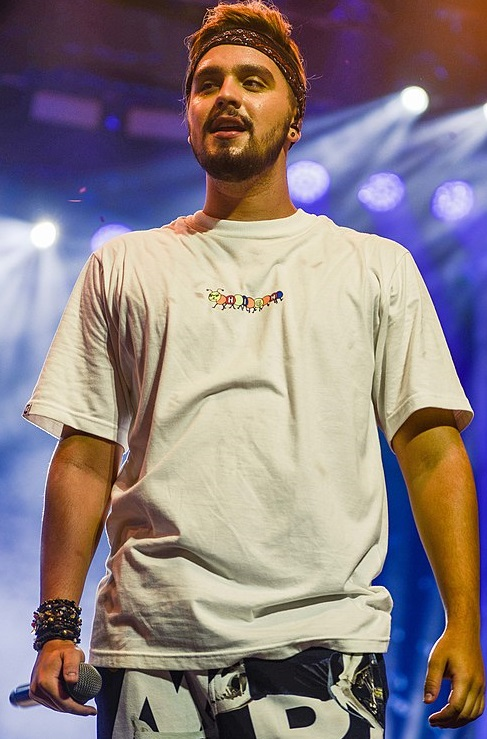
The inaugural winner, Luan Santana, won the award four consecutive times.

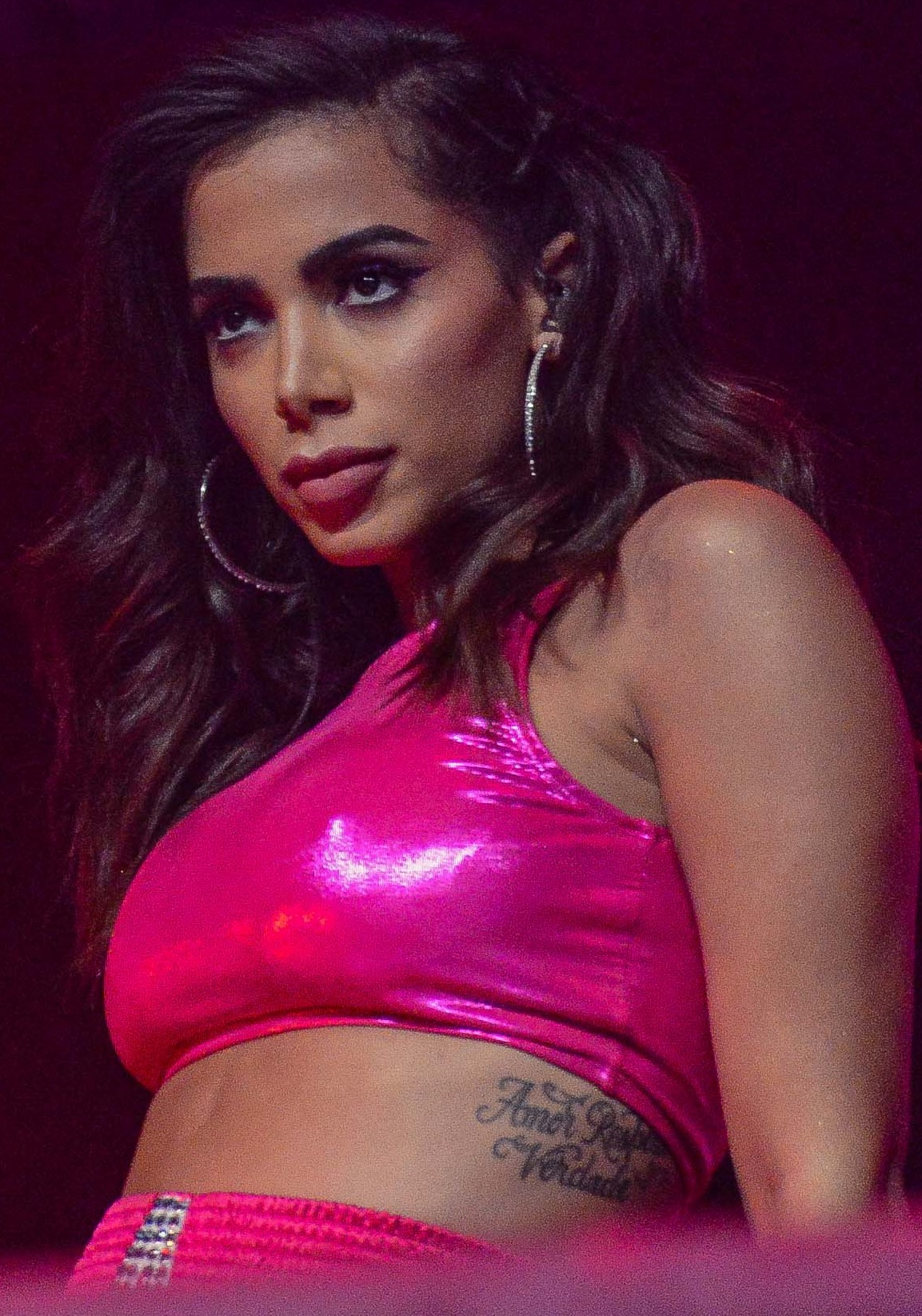
Anitta is the category's most awarded artist, winning seven times: 2018, 2019, 2020, 2021, 2022, 2023 and 2024.

=== 2010s ===
Recipients
Year	Winner(s)	Video	Nominees	Ref.
2014	Luan Santana	"Te Esperando"	Anitta – "Na Batida"; Jota Quest – "Waiting for You"; MC Guimê (featuring Emicida) – "País do Futebol"; Valesca Popozuda – "Beijinho no Ombro"	
2015	Luan Santana	"Escreve Aí"	Anitta – "Ritmo Perfeito"; Lucas Lucco – "Vai Vendo"; Ludmilla – "Te Ensinei Certin"; Thiaguinho – "Sem Você a Vida é Tão Sem Graça"	
2016	Luan Santana	"Eu, Você, o Mar e Ela"	Anitta – "Bang"; Duduzinho – "O Mundo É Nosso"; Ludmilla – "Bom"; Sophia Abrahão – "Sou Fatal"	
2017	Luan Santana	"Acordando o Prédio"	Anitta – "Paradinha"; Ludmilla – "Cheguei"; MC Kevinho – "Tô Apaixonado Nessa Mina"; Pabllo Vittar – "K.O."	
2018	Anitta, MC Zaac and Maejor (featuring Tropkillaz and DJ Yuri Martins)	"Vai Malandra"	Kevinho and Simone & Simaria – "Ta Tum Tum"; Ludmilla (featuring MC Pupio and MC Doguinha) – "Din Din Din"; Pabllo Vittar – "Indestrutível"; Wesley Safadão and Anitta – "Romance com Safadeza"	
2019	Anitta and Kevinho	"Terremoto"	Lexa and MC Kekel – "Amor Bandido"; Luan Santana (featuring MC Kekel) – "Vingança"; Luísa Sonza and Pabllo Vittar – "Garupa"; Marília Mendonça – "Bem Pior Que Eu"	

=== 2020s ===
Recipients
Year	Winner(s)	Video	Nominees	Ref.
2020	Anitta, Lexa and Luísa Sonza (featuring MC Rebecca)	"Combatchy"	Léo Santana – "Crise de Saudades"; Luan Santana – "Asas"; MC Lan, Skrillex and TroyBoi (featuring Ludmilla and Ty Dolla Sign) – "Malokera"; Pabllo Vittar – "Amor de Que"	
2021	Anitta	"Girl from Rio"	Luan Santana – "Morena"; Ludmilla – "Rainha de Favela"; Luísa Sonza and Pabllo Vittar (featuring Anitta) – "Modo Turbo"; Pedro Sampaio and Luísa Sonza – "Atenção"	
2022	Anitta	"Boys Don't Cry"	Anitta – "Envolver"; Gloria Groove – "A Queda"; Gloria Groove – "Vermelho"; Iza – "Fé"; Jão – "Idiota"; Jovem Dionisio – "Acorda Pedrinho"; Luísa Sonza – "Cachorrinhas"	
2023	Jão and Anitta	"Pilantra"	Anitta – "Funk Rave"; Dennis and Kevin o Chris – "Tá OK"; Iza and MC Carol – "Fé nas Maluca"; Luísa Sonza – "Campo de Morango"; Matuê (featuring Rich the Kid) – "Conexões de Máfia"	
2024	Anitta	"Mil Veces"	Liniker – "Tudo"; Luísa Sonza (featuring Kayblack) – "Sagrado Profano"; Matuê – "O Som"; MC Cabelinho – "Carta Aberta"; Yago Oproprio – "La Noche"	
2025	Zé Felipe and Ana Castela	"Sua Boca Mente (You're Still the One)"	Filipe Ret – "Acima de Mim Só Deus"; Marina Sena – "Lua Cheia"; Marina Sena – "Numa Ilha"; Menos é Mais and Simone Mendes – "P do Pecado"; Liniker and Priscila Senna – "Pote de Ouro"	

== Statistics ==
=== Artists with multiple wins ===
7 wins

- Anitta

4 wins

- Luan Santana

=== Artists with multiple nominations ===
15 nominations

- Anitta

7 nominations

- Luan Santana
- Luísa Sonza

6 nominations

- Ludmilla

5 nominations

- Pabllo Vittar

3 nominations

- Kevinho

2 nominations

- Gloria Groove
- Iza
- Jão
- Lexa
- Liniker
- Matuê
- Marina Sena
- MC Kekel
