= Super (Jão album) =

2023 studio album by Jão

Studio album by Jão
- Released: 14 August 2023
- Recorded: 2021–2023
- Studio: Toca do Lobo (São Paulo)
- Genres: Pop; pop rock
- Length: 41:52
- Label: Universal
- Producers: Jão; Zebu

Jão chronology
Pirata (2021)	Super (2023)	Memórias Póstumas (2026)

Singles from Super
- 1. "Me Lambe" Released: 14 August 2023; 2. "Alinhamento Milenar" Released: 24 January 2024

Super (stylized in all caps) is the fourth studio album by Brazilian singer Jão. It was released on 14 August 2023, by Universal Music. Produced by Jão and Zebu, Super is a pop and pop rock album. The project concludes a series of four albums guided by the classical elements—earth (Lobos, 2018), air (Anti-Herói, 2019), water (Pirata, 2021), and fire (Super).

Upon release, Super was met with generally favorable reviews from music critics. Commercially, it broke the record for the biggest album debut in the history of Spotify Brazil. (Note: The record was surpassed by Luísa Sonza's Escândalo Íntimo on 31 August 2023.) It was nominated for Multishow Brazilian Music Award for Album of the Year and Latin Grammy Award for Best Portuguese Language Contemporary Pop Album. The album was supported by two singles: "Me Lambe" and "Alinhamento Milenar". To promote the album, Jão embarked on his fourth concert tour, SuperTurnê, in 2024. A reissue of the album, titled Supernova, was released on 11 June 2024.

== Release and promotion ==
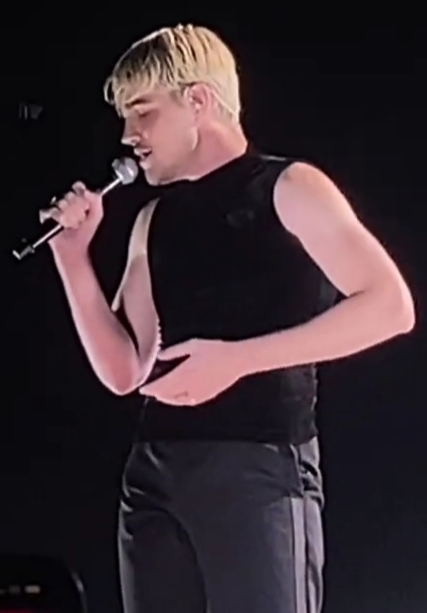
Jão performing at the SuperTurnê in 2024

On 8 August 2023, Jão archived his Instagram posts and updated his social media profiles with the color red. A few hours later, the artist published an open letter announcing that his fourth album would be called Super. On 10 August 2023, he announced the release date, and the following day, the cover artwork and tracklist were revealed. Jão hosted a free listening session for the album at the Ginásio do Ibirapuera in São Paulo on 13 August 2023. Super was released on digital formats on 14 August 2023, by Universal Music. Jão teased a new edition of the album in early 2024. On 1 June 2024, during a SuperTurnê show in Rio de Janeiro, he officially announced the reissue titled Supernova, as the "deluxe" edition of the original album. The reissue was released on June 11, 2024. The standard edition was issued on CD on 31 July 2024.

On the day of the album's release, "Me Lambe" was released as the lead single. A music video for the song was released on 14 September 2023, which featured João Guilherme. "Me Lambe" peaked at number 48 on the Billboard Brasil Hot 100. "Alinhamento Milenar" was released as the second single on 24 January 2024, accompanied by a short film.

Officially announced on 16 August 2023, the SuperTurnê began on 20 January 2024, at the Allianz Parque in São Paulo, and concluded at the same venue on 18 January 2025.

== Accolades ==
Awards and nominations for Super
Organization	Year	Category	Result	Ref.
Multishow Brazilian Music Awards	2023	Album of the Year	Nominated	
Multishow Brazilian Music Awards	2023	Album Cover of the Year	Nominated	
LGBT + Som Awards	2023	Best National Album	Nominated	
SEC Awards	2024	Album/EP of the Year	Won	
SEC Awards	2024	Album Cover of the Year	Nominated	
Latin Grammy Awards	2024	Best Portuguese Language Contemporary Pop Album	Nominated	

== Track listing ==
All tracks are produced by Jão and Zebu.

No.	Title	Writer(s)	Length
1.	"Escorpião"	Jão; Pedro Tófani; Zebu	2:29
2.	"Me Lambe"	Jão; Tófani; Tropkillaz; Zebu	2:55
3.	"Gameboy"	Jão; Tófani; Zebu	2:59
4.	"Alinhamento Milenar"	Jão; Tófani; Zebu	3:22
5.	"Lábia"	Jão; Tófani; Zebu	2:52
6.	"Maria"	Jão	1:58
7.	"Julho"	Jão; Tófani; Zebu	3:08
8.	"Eu Posso Ser como Você"	Jão; Zebu	2:32
9.	"Sinais"	Jão; Tófani; Zebu	3:04
10.	"Se o Problema Era Você, Por Que Doeu em Mim?"	Jão; Tófani; Zebu	2:38
11.	"Locadora"	Jão; Tófani; Zebu	3:10
12.	"Rádio"	Jão; Tófani; Zebu	3:47
13.	"São Paulo, 2015"	Jão; Tófani; Zebu	2:29
14.	"Super"	Jão; Tófani; Zebu	4:29
Total length:			41:52

Supernova – deluxe and standard edition
No.	Title	Writer(s)	Length
1.	"Religião"	Jão; Zebu	3:12
2.	"Acidente"	Jão; Tófani; Zebu	3:06
3.	"Modo de Dizer"	Jão; Tófani; Zebu	2:56
4.	"O Triste É Que Eu Te Amo"	Jão; Tófani; Zebu; Björn Yttling; John Eriksson; Peter Morén	3:32
5.	"Carnaval"	Jão; Tófani	1:58
6.	"Locadora" (Extended Version)	Jão; Tófani; Zebu	4:38
7.	"Supernova"	Jão; Tófani; Zebu	3:01
8.	"Paranoid"	Jão	3:36
Total length:			66:13

== Release history ==
Release dates and formats for Super
Region	Date	Format(s)	Edition	Label	Ref.
Various	14 August 2023	Digital download; streaming	Standard	Universal	
Various	11 June 2024	Digital download; streaming	Supernova	Universal	
Brazil	31 July 2024	CD	Standard	Universal	
