= Lobos (album) =

2018 studio album by Jão

Studio album by Jão
- Released: 17 August 2018
- Recorded: 2018
- Studio: Head Media (São Paulo)
- Genre: Pop
- Length: 31:56
- Language: Portuguese
- Label: Universal
- Producer: Pedro Dash; Marcelinho Ferraz

Jão chronology
Primeiro Acústico (2018)	Lobos (2018)	Anti-Herói (2019)

Singles from Lobos
- 1. "Vou Morrer Sozinho" Released: 14 August 2018; 2. "Me Beija com Raiva" Released: 13 December 2018

Lobos (transl. Wolves) is the debut studio album by Brazilian singer Jão. It was released on 17 August 2018, by Universal Music. Produced by Pedro Dash and Marcelinho Ferraz, is a pop album. Diogo Piçarra appear as guest vocalists.

The album was supported by two singles: "Vou Morrer Sozinho" and "Me Beija com Raiva". Lobos has since been certified double platinum by the Pro-Música Brasil (PMB). To promote the album, Jão embarked on his first concert tour, Turnê Lobos (2018–2019). Lobos is the first in a series of four albums guided by the four elements — earth (Lobos), air (Anti-Herói, 2019), water (Pirata, 2021), and fire (Super, 2023).

== Background ==
Jão first began his career through YouTube, posting covers videos in 2016. He was discovered by music producers Pedro Dash and Marcelinho Ferraz, and signed a contract with Head Media, a Universal Music Group label. In November 2016, Jão released his debut single, "Dança pra Mim", with Pedrowl. In June 2018, he released a four-track acoustic EP titled Primeiro Acústico. He initially planned to release an EP with unreleased songs, but after gaining attention, he decided to record a studio album.

== Release and promotion ==
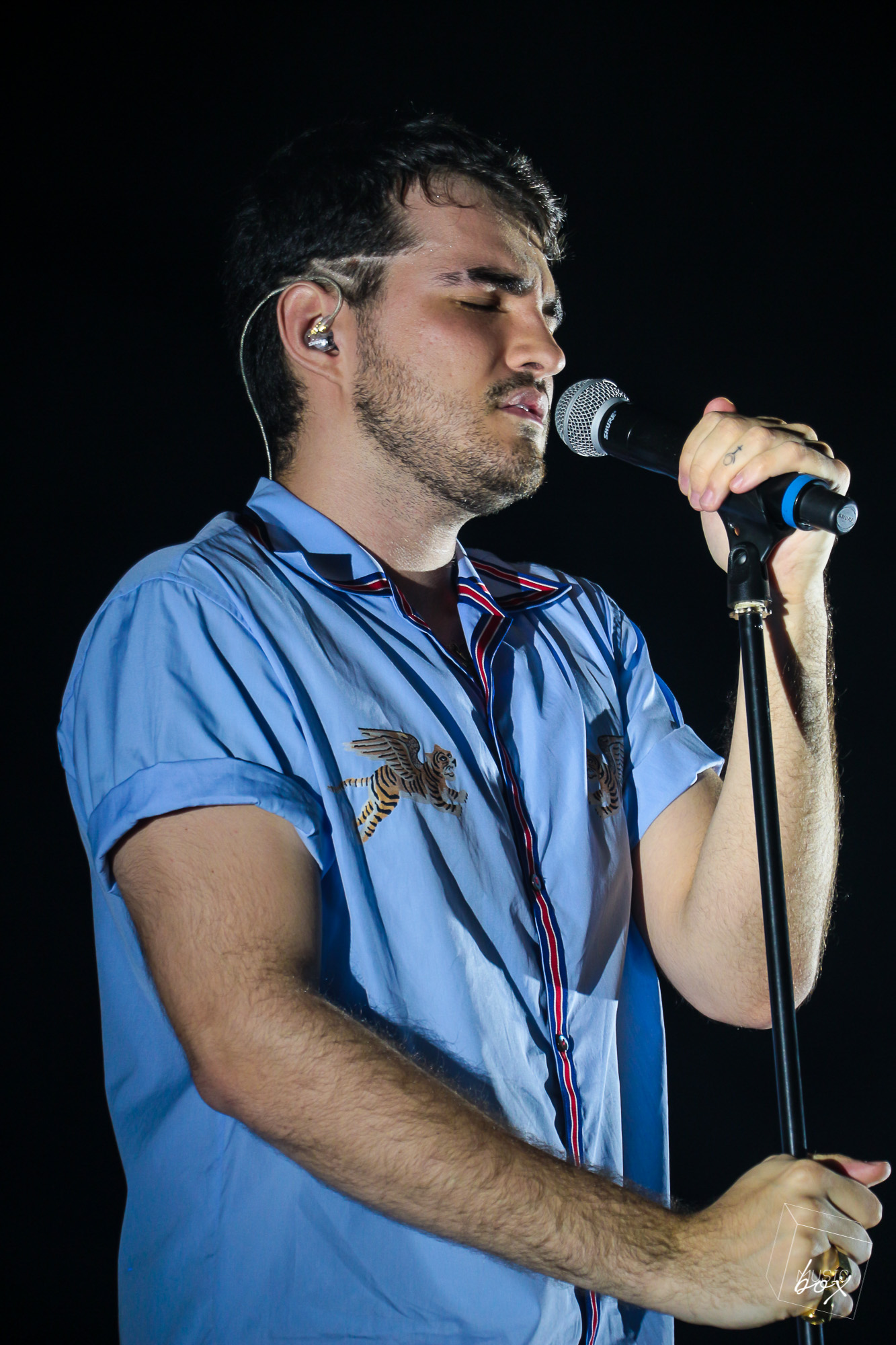
Jão on the Turnê Lobos in 2018

In July 2018, Jão revealed that the album would be titled Lobos. The cover art, release date, and tracklist were revealed in August 2018. Lobos was released on digital formats on 17 August 2018, by Universal Music. The CDs were released on 14 December 2018. The bonus tracks from the deluxe edition of Lobos, "Fim do Mundo" and "Ressaca", which were previously exclusive to the physical version, were released digitally on 25 January 2019. Vinyl LPs were released on 3 November 2023. Lobos was supported by two singles: "Vou Morrer Sozinho" was released as the lead single on 14 August 2018, followed by "Me Beija com Raiva" as the second on 13 December 2018. Its accompanying music videos were directed by Pedro Tófani. On 21 August 2018, Jão announced that he would embark on the Turnê Lobos to support the album. The tour began on 21 September 2018 in Belo Horizonte, Minas Gerais, and concluded on 1 June 2019 in Londrina, Paraná. On 10 June 2019, Jão released the audiovisual of the tour.

== Critical reception ==
Luiz Prisco of Metrópoles described Lobos as good, stating that "the album shows that there are young talents in Brazilian music willing to take risks and bring fresh perspectives." Tracklist's Lucas Ribeiro praised the album for its polished production and inspired lyrics, stating that "Jão showcases various facets of his pop, bringing something new and refreshing to the Brazilian music scene." Giovana Romania of Nação da Música described the album as powerful: "In lyrics, beats, melodies, and emotions. In an era flooded with singles designed purely for commercial success, this album emerges with a beginning, middle, and end—and it deserves to be listened to as such." Writing for It Pop, Guilherme Tintel described Lobos as "the least cliché cliché possible."

Rolling Stone Brasil ranked Lobos at 49th on its list of the 50 best national albums of 2018, stating that "Brazilian pop is very well served."

== Track listing ==
All tracks are produced by Marcelinho Ferraz and Pedro Dash.

Lobos standard track listing
No.	Title	Writer(s)	Length
1.	"Vou Morrer Sozinho"	Jão; Pedro Tófani; Pedro Dash; Dan Valbusa; Marcelinho Ferraz	2:55
2.	"Me Beija com Raiva"	Jão; Tófani; Dash; Valbusa; Ferraz	3:17
3.	"Lindo Demais"	Jão; Tófani; Dash; Valbusa; Ferraz	3:00
4.	"Imaturo"	Jão; Dash; Valbusa; Ferraz	2:58
5.	"Ainda Te Amo"	Jão; Tófani; Dash; Valbusa; Ferraz	3:10
6.	"A Rua"	Jão; Tófani; Dash; Valbusa; Ferraz	2:36
7.	"Lobos"	Jão; Tófani; Dash; Valbusa; Ferraz	3:43
8.	"Eu Quero Ser como Você"	Jão; Tófani; Dash; Valbusa; Ferraz	3:10
9.	"Aqui" (with Diogo Piçarra)	Jão; Piçarra; Dash; Valbusa; Ferraz	3:51
10.	"Monstros"	Jão; Tófani	4:15
Total length:			31:56

Deluxe edition bonus tracks
No.	Title	Writer(s)	Length
11.	"Fim do Mundo"	Jão; Tófani; Dash; Valbusa; Ferraz	3:46
12.	"Ressaca"	Jão; Dash; Valbusa; Ferraz	3:00
Total length:			38:02

== Credits and personnel ==
Adapted from the liner notes of Lobos

- Jão – lead vocals, songwriting, arrangement
- Pedro Dash – production, songwriting, arrangement
- Marcelinho Ferraz – production, songwriting, arrangement, recording, mixing, digital edition, electronic effects
- Filipe Florido – assistant recording
- Chris Gehringer – mastering
- Diogo Piçarra – vocals, songwriting (9)
- Dan Valbusa – guitar, arrangement
- Luana Jones – background vocals (6)
- Francine Mor – background vocals (6)
- Srta. Paola – background vocals (6, 12)
- Jhow – background vocals (12)
- Maycon Ananias – piano (9, 10)

== Certifications ==
Certifications for Lobos
Region	Certification	Certified units/sales
Brazil (Pro-Música Brasil) Deluxe	2× Platinum	160,000^{‡}
^{‡} Sales+streaming figures based on certification alone.

== Release history ==
Release dates and formats for Lobos
Region	Date	Format(s)	Edition	Label	Ref.
Various	17 August 2018	Digital download; streaming	Standard	Universal	
Brazil	14 December 2018	CD	Deluxe	Universal	
Various	25 January 2019	Digital download; streaming	Deluxe	Universal	
Brazil	3 November 2023	Vinyl LP	Deluxe	Universal	
