= 2015 Multishow Brazilian Music Awards =

22nd edition of the Multishow Brazilian Music Awards held in 2015

- Date: 1 September 2015
- Location: HSBC Arena; Rio de Janeiro, Rio de Janeiro, Brazil
- Hosted by: Ivete Sangalo; Paulo Gustavo
- Website: gshow.globo.com/multishow/premio-multishow

Television/radio coverage
- Network: Multishow

The 2015 Multishow Brazilian Music Awards (Portuguese: Prêmio Multishow de Música Brasileira 2015) (or simply 2015 Multishow Awards) (Portuguese: Prêmio Multishow 2015) was held on 1 September 2015, at the HSBC Arena in Rio de Janeiro, Brazil. Singer Ivete Sangalo and actor Paulo Gustavo hosted the show.

== Winners and nominees ==
The nominees were announced on 10 August 2015. Anitta, Ava Rocha and Luan Santana were the most awarded artists, winning two awards each. Winners are listed first and highlighted in bold.

=== Voted categories ===
The winners of the following categories were chosen by fan votes.

Best Male Singer	Best Female Singer
**Lucas Lucco**; Gusttavo Lima; Péricles; Sam Alves; Thiaguinho	**Ivete Sangalo**; Ana Carolina; Anitta; Paula Fernandes; Pitty
Best Group	Best Show
**Turma do Pagode**; Banda Calypso; Malta; Skank; Sorriso Maroto	**Anitta**; Henrique & Juliano; Luan Santana; Paula Fernandes; Sorriso Maroto
Best Song	Earworm Song
**"Ritmo Perfeito" – Anitta**; "Coração Selvagem" – Ana Carolina; "Dentro de um Abraço" – Jota Quest; "Escreve Aí" – Luan Santana; "Esquecimento" – Skank	**"Eu Não Merecia Isso" – Luan Santana**; "Cobertor" – Anitta featuring Projota; "Eu Sou a Diva que Você Quer Copiar" – Valesca Popozuda; "Hoje" – Ludmilla; "Suíte 14" – Henrique & Diego featuring MC Guimê
Try It	TVZ Music Video of the Year
**Jamz**; Henrique & Diego; Mosquito; Onze:20; Suricato	**"Escreve Aí" – Luan Santana**; "Ritmo Perfeito" – Anitta; "Sem Você a Vida Fica Tão Sem Graça" – Thiaguinho; "Te Ensinei Certin" – Ludmilla; "Vai Vendo" – Lucas Lucco

=== Professional categories ===
The winners of the following categories are chosen by members of the music industry.

Best Album	New Song
**Fortaleza – Cidadão Instigado**; Ava Patrya Yndia Yracema – Ava Rocha; Dancê – Tulipa Ruiz	**"Tombei" – Karol Conká featuring Tropkillaz**; "Cartão de Visita" – Criolo featuring Tulipa Ruiz; "Mantra" – Maglore; "Proporcional" – Tulipa Ruiz
New Artist	New Hit
**Ava Rocha**; Dônica; Lila	**"Você Não Vai Passar" – Ava Rocha**; "Deixa Ele Sofrer" – Anitta; "Melô do Jonas" – Figueroas; "Tombei" – Karol Conká featuring Tropkillaz
Version of the Year	Best Music Video
**"Me Perco Nesse Tempo" – Metá Metá**; "A Noite" – Tiê; "Tudo o Que Você Podia Ser" – Rashid; "Rainha dos Darks" – Bonde do Rolé featuring Luisinho; "Mil e Uma Noites de Amor" – Céu	**"Boa Esperança" – Emicida**; "Redes Sociais" – Nego do Borel; "Tombei" – Karol Conká featuring Tropkillaz; "Um Sonho" – Nação Zumbi
Shared Song
**"De Baile Solto" – Siba**; "Convoque Seu Buda" – Criolo; "Fortaleza" – Cidadão Instigado
