= 2022 Multishow Brazilian Music Awards =

29th edition of the Multishow Brazilian Music Awards held in 2022

- Date: 18 October 2022
- Location: Jeunesse Arena; Rio de Janeiro, Rio de Janeiro, Brazil
- Hosted by: Gloria Groove; Linn da Quebrada; Marcos Mion

Highlights
- Most awards: Anitta (3)
- Most nominations: Anitta; Gloria Groove (8 each)
- Website: gshow.globo.com/multishow/premio-multishow

Television/radio coverage
- Network: Multishow; Globoplay

The 2022 Multishow Brazilian Music Awards (Portuguese: Prêmio Multishow de Música Brasileira 2022) (or simply 2022 Multishow Awards) (Portuguese: Prêmio Multishow 2022) was held on 18 October 2022, at the Jeunesse Arena in Rio de Janeiro, Brazil. Singers Gloria Groove and Linn da Quebrada and television presenter Marcos Mion hosted the show.

The nominations were reveled on 29 August 2022. Anitta and Gloria Groove lead the nominations with eight each. Anitta received the most awards with three.

== Performances ==
=== Pre-show ===
List of performers at the premiere ceremony
Artist(s)	Song(s)
Ana Castela	"Pipoco"
Jovem Dionisio	"Acorda Pedrinho"
Priscilla Alcantara	"Você é um Perigo" "Uptown Funk" (Mark Ronson cover) "Correntes" "Sobrevivi" "Tudo Pah!" "Bomba" "Tremendo Vacilão" (Perlla cover) "Bang" (Anitta cover) "Máscaras" (Pitty cover) "Graveto" (Marília Mendonça cover) "Survivor" (Destiny's Child cover)
Thiago Pantaleão	"Lambo" "Joga Na Minha Cara" "Desculpa por Eu Não Te Amar" "Mente Pra Mim" "Fim do Mundo"
Xamã	"Era Uma Vez" "Malvadão 3"

=== Main ceremony ===
List of performers at the 2022 Multishow Brazilian Music Awards
Artist(s)	Song(s)
Ludmilla	"Tic Tac" "Modo Avião" "Maldivas"
Diego & Victor Hugo	"Facas" "Desbloqueado" "Beijo de Glicose"
L7nnon Bianca Leo do Furduncinho	"Gratidão" "Freio da Blazer" "Ai Preto"
Liniker Dona Onete	"Baby 95" "Jamburana" "Banzeiro"
Gloria Groove	"A Queda" "Leilão" "Bonekinha" "Vermelho"
Criolo Planet Hemp	"Distopia"
Luísa Sonza Xamã	"O Conto dos Dois Mundos (Hipocrisia)" "Hotel Caro" "Poesia Acústica #13"
Thiaguinho	"Falta Você" "Travessia" "Um Dia de Domingo" "Palco" "Final Feliz" "Sou o Cara pra Você" "Ainda Bem"
Larissa Luz Linn da Quebrada	Tribute to Elza Soares "Não Tá Mais de Graça"
Jão	"Meninos e Meninas" "Idiota"
Iza	"Mole" "Mó Paz" "Droga"

== Winners and nominees ==
The nominations were announced on 29 August 2022. The Female Singer of the Year and Male Singer of the Year awards were replaced with Artist of the Year and Voice of the Year. Anitta and Gloria Groove were the most nominated artists, with eight nominations each, followed by Jão e Ludmilla with six, and Jovem Dionisio with five. Anitta was the most awarded artist with three wins. Winners appear first and highlighted in bold.

=== Voted categories ===
The winners of the following categories were chosen by fan votes.

Artist of the Year	Voice of the Year
**Anitta**; Gloria Groove; Gusttavo Lima; Jão; João Gomes; L7nnon; Ludmilla; Luísa Sonza	**Gloria Groove**; Anitta; Iza; Jão; Liniker; Ludmilla; Luísa Sonza; Marisa Monte
Group of the Year	Duo of the Year
**Lagum**; Afrocidade; Bala Desejo; Black Pantera; Gilsons; Grupo Menos é Mais; Jovem Dionisio; Raça Negra	**Maiara & Maraisa**; Anavitória; Diego & Victor Hugo; Henrique & Juliano; Jorge & Mateus; Matheus & Kauan; Tasha & Tracie; Yoùn
Album of the Year	Show of the Year
**Lume – Filipe Ret**; Lady Leste – Gloria Groove; Numanice #2 – Ludmilla; Pirata – Jão; Pra Gente Acordar – Gilsons; QVVJFA? – Baco Exu do Blues; Sobre Viver – Criolo; Versions of Me – Anitta	**Turnê Irmãos – Alexandre Pires e Seu Jorge**; Turnê Meu Coco – Caetano Veloso; Turnê Nu – Djonga; Tour AmarElo – Emicida; Turnê Pirata – Jão; Turnê Numanice – Ludmilla; Tour Portas – Marisa Monte; Turnê Infinito – Thiaguinho
Song of the Year	Hit of the Year
**"Envolver" – Anitta**; "Acorda Pedrinho" – Jovem Dionisio; "Desenrola Bate Joga de Ladin" – L7nnon, Os Hawaianos and DJ Bel da CDD (featuring DJ Biel do Furduncinho); "Fé" – Iza; "Maldivas" – Ludmilla; "Malvadão 3" – Xamã, Gustah and Neobeats; "Vampiro" – Matuê, Teto and WIU; "Vermelho" – Gloria Groove	**"Maldivas" – Ludmilla**; "Acorda Pedrinho" – Jovem Dionisio; "Dançarina" – Pedro Sampaio and MC Pedrinho; "Desenrola Bate Joga de Ladin" – L7nnon, Os Hawaianos and DJ Bel da CDD (featuring DJ Biel do Furduncinho); "Envolver" – Anitta; "Idiota" – Jão; "Malvadão 3" – Xamã, Gustah and Neobeats; "Vermelho" – Gloria Groove
TVZ Music Video of the Year	New Artist of the Year
**"Boys Don't Cry" – Anitta (Director: Anitta and Christian Bleslauer)**; "A Queda" – Gloria Groove (Director: Felipe Sassi); "Acorda Pedrinho" – Jovem Dionisio (Director: Bernardo Pasquali); "Cachorrinhas" – Luísa Sonza (Director: Fernando Nogari); "Envolver" – Anitta (Director: Anitta); "Fé" – Iza (Director: Felipe Sassi); "Idiota" – Jão (Director: Pedro Tófani); "Vermelho" – Gloria Groove (Director: Belle de Melo)	**Ana Castela**; Bala Desejo; Jovem Dionisio; Mari Fernandez; Nattanzinho; Rachel Reis; Tasha & Tracie; Urias

=== Professional categories ===
The winners of the following categories were chosen by the Multishow Awards Academy.

Instrumentalist of the Year	Music Producer of the Year	Album Cover of the Year
**Pretinho da Serrinha**; Amaro Freitas; Castilhol; Hamilton de Holanda; Jonathan Ferr; Kiko Dinucci; Mateus Asato; Silvanny Sivuca	**Papatinho**; Eduardo Pepato; Pablo Bispo; Prateado; Pupillo; Rafinha RSQ; Ruxell no Beat; Vhoor	**"Fé" – Iza**; Fúria – Urias; Lady Leste – Gloria Groove; Lume – Filipe Ret; Portas – Marisa Monte; QVVJFA? – Baco Exu do Blues; Urucum – Karol Conká; Versions of Me – Anitta
