= Memórias Póstumas (album) =

2026 studio album by Jão

Studio album by Jão
- Released: 26 July 2026
- Recorded: 2025–2026
- Length: 51:27
- Labels: U.F.O. Produções Artísticas; Universal
- Producer: Jão

Jão chronology
Super (2023)	Memórias Póstumas (2026)

Singles from Memórias Póstumas
- 1. "Catedral" Released: 26 July 2026; 2. "Aurora" Released: 15 September 2026

Memórias Póstumas ('Posthumous Memoirs') (Note: See the text: The Posthumous Memoirs of Brás Cubas) is the fifth studio album by Brazilian singer Jão. It was released on 26 July 2026, by U.F.O. Produções Artísticas and Universal Music, along with the lead single, "Catedral".

== Release and promotion ==
On 22 July 2026, a commercial featuring Jão aired during a commercial break of TV Globo's telenovela Quem Ama Cuida. A countdown also appeared on the artist's official website. When it ended on 23 July, Memórias Póstumas was officially announced. The album cover and track listing were unveiled the following day. A free listening session for the project take place at Vale do Anhangabaú in São Paulo on 26 July. Memórias Póstumas was released digitally hours later, by U.F.O. Produções Artísticas and Universal Music. "Catedral" was released as the lead single in conjunction with the album. A music video for the song was shot at the São Paulo Museum of Art. Jão announced the Turnê Memórias Póstumas on July 27. The first show of the tour will be held on September 25 at Nubank Parque in São Paulo.

== Accolades ==
Awards and nominations for Memórias Póstumas
Organization	Year	Category	Result	Ref.
Multishow Brazilian Music Awards	2026	Album of the Year	Pending	

== Track listing ==
No.	Title	Writer(s)	Producer(s)	Length
1.	"Catedral"	Jão; Pedro Tófani	Jão; Janluska; Gabriel Duarte	3:41
2.	"O Amor"	Jão; Tófani	Jão; Zebu; Mazzola	2:57
3.	"Aurora"	Jão; Tófani	Jão; Zebu	3:40
4.	"Por Você"	Jão; Tófani	Jão; Zebu	3:32
5.	"Literatura"	Jão; Tófani	Jão; Zebu	5:03
6.	"Eu Sempre Volto"	Jão; Tófani	Jão; Janluska; Duarte	4:24
7.	"Jabuticabeira"	Jão	Jão; Zebu	3:16
8.	"João"	Tófani	Jão	2:32
9.	"Tudo Me Lembra"	Jão; Tófani	Jão; Zebu	3:39
10.	"Coincidências"	Jão; Tófani	Jão; Zebu	3:41
11.	"O Arquiteto"	Jão	Jão	3:54
12.	"Curioso"	Jão	Jão; Zebu	3:48
13.	"Passeios Noturnos"	Jão	Jão; Zebu	3:21
14.	"Memórias Póstumas"	Jão	Jão	3:59
Total length:				51:27

== Charts ==
Chart performance
Chart (2026)	Peak position
Portuguese Albums (AFP)	67
