= Pirata (Jão album) =

2021 studio album by Jão

Studio album by Jão
- Released: 19 October 2021
- Recorded: 2020–2021
- Studio: Toca do Lobo (São Paulo)
- Genre: Pop
- Length: 33:42
- Label: Universal
- Producer: Jão; Paul Ralphes; Zebu

Jão chronology
Anti-Herói (2019)	Pirata (2021)	Super (2023)

Singles from Pirata
- 1. "Coringa" Released: 24 February 2021; 2. "Não Te Amo" Released: 19 October 2021; 3. "Idiota" Released: 9 February 2022

Pirata (transl. Pirate) is the third studio album by Brazilian singer Jão, released on 19 October 2021, by Universal Music. Described by Jão as a "album about new beginnings", Pirata explores themes such as love, sex, discoveries, and farewells. He produced the album with Paul Ralphes and Zebu.

The album was supported by three singles: "Coringa", "Não Te Amo", and "Idiota". Pirata was nominated for Multishow Brazilian Music Award for Album of the Year and Latin Grammy Award for Best Portuguese Language Contemporary Pop Album. The album won the MTV MIAW Awards Brazil for Album of the Year. Jão promoted the album with appearances at several award shows, television programs and festivals, as well embarked on the Turnê Pirata. The album has since been certified 2× platinum by the Pro-Música Brasil (PMB).

== Release and promotion ==
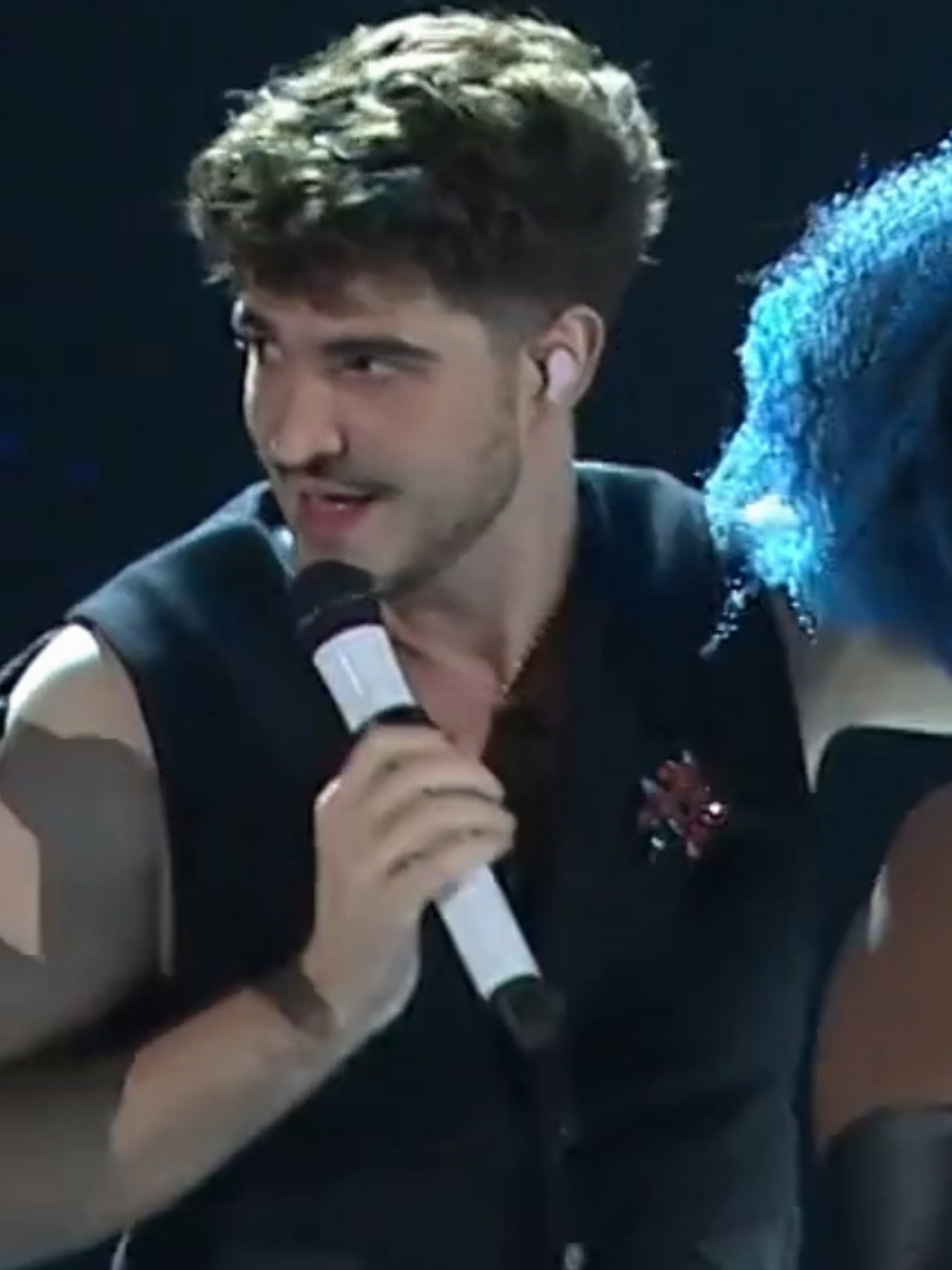
Jão performing at the 2022 Multishow Brazilian Music Awards

Jão commenced teasing the release of Pirata on 22 September 2021, when he posted on social media saying: "You have a few days to break up with someone, because my new album is coming. Until then, see you soon". He revealed the album's name on 13 October 2021. Its release date, cover, and tracklist were announced on 18 October 2021. Pirata was released through digital format on 19 October 2021, by Universal Music. The CDs were released on 22 June 2022, while vinyl LPs were released on 3 November 2023; the physical formats contain the bonus track "Amor Pirata".

=== Singles ===
The album's lead single, "Coringa", was released on 24 February 2021. The song peaked at number 82 on Brazil's Top 100 Airplay chart, while peaked at number 7 on the National Pop Airplay chart. "Não Te Amo" was released as the second single in tandem with Pirata on 19 October 2021. In December 2021, "Idiota" went viral after being used in videos on TikTok. This resulted in a large increase in plays on Spotify. It was eventually released as the third single from the album on 9 February 2022. Commercially, "Idiota" peaked at number 23 on the Billboard's Brazil Songs, and number 17 in Portugal.

=== Live performances ===
To promote Pirata, Jão held several live performances. He performed at awards shows including the MTV MIAW Awards Brazil, Multishow Brazilian Music Award, and Latin Grammy Awards. His appearances on television shows included Caldeirão com Mion, Encontro com Fátima Bernardes, Faustão na Band, Altas Horas, and Música Boa Ao Vivo. He also was part of the line-up for several festivals including Lollapalooza, MEO Sudoeste, and Rock in Rio. The album's supporting tour, Turnê Pirata, ran from March to December 2022. It kicked off in Rio de Janeiro and was wrapped up with a free show in São Paulo, spanning 40 shows. The tour was attended by 250,000 people and grossed R$ 30 million in revenue.

== Accolades ==
Awards and nominations for Pirata
Organization	Year	Category	Result	Ref.
POP Mais Awards	2021	Album of the Year	Nominated	
SEC Awards	2022	Album/EP of the Year	Nominated	
MTV MIAW Awards Brazil	2022	Album of the Year	Won	
Multishow Brazilian Music Awards	2022	Album of the Year	Nominated	
Trends Brasil Conference	2022	Best Album – 2021	Won	
Latin Grammy Awards	2022	Best Portuguese Language Contemporary Pop Album	Nominated	

== Track listing ==
Pirata – Standard edition
No.	Title	Writer(s)	Producer(s)	Length
1.	"Clarão"	Jão; Pedro Tófani; Zebu	Jão; Zebu	3:10
2.	"Não Te Amo"	Jão; Tófani; Zebu	Jão; Zebu	3:01
3.	"Idiota"	Jão; Tófani; Zebu	Jão; Zebu	3:02
4.	"Santo"	Jão; Tófani; Zebu	Jão; Paul Ralphes; Zebu	2:43
5.	"Acontece"	Jão; Tófani	Jão; Ralphes; Zebu	2:42
6.	"Você Me Perdeu"	Jão; Tófani; Zebu	Jão; Zebu	2:33
7.	"Meninos e Meninas"	Jão	Jão; Ralphes; Zebu	2:42
8.	"Coringa"	Jão; Tófani; Zebu	Jão; Ralphes; Zebu	3:07
9.	"Doce"	Jão; Tófani; Zebu	Jão; Zebu	3:15
10.	"Tempos de Glória"	Jão	Jão; Ralphes	2:27
11.	"Olhos Vermelhos"	Jão	Jão	5:04
Total length:				33:42

Pirata – Physical edition bonus track
No.	Title	Writer(s)	Producer(s)	Length
12.	"Amor Pirata"	Jão; Tófani; Zebu; Arthur Marques	Jão; Ralphes; Zebu	2:53
Total length:				36:34

== Certifications ==
Certifications for Pirata
Region	Certification	Certified units/sales
Brazil (Pro-Música Brasil)	Diamond	300,000^{‡}
^{‡} Sales+streaming figures based on certification alone.

== Release history ==
Release dates and formats for Pirata
Region	Date	Format(s)	Label	Ref.
Various	19 October 2021	Digital download; streaming	Universal	
Brazil	22 June 2022	CD	Universal	
Portugal	28 October 2022	CD	Universal	
Brazil	3 November 2023	Vinyl LP	Universal	
