= Jovem Dionisio =

Brazilian musical group

- Origin: Brazil
- Genres: Indie pop * Indie rock
- Members: Bernardo Pasquali; Gustavo Karam; Rafael Dunajski Mendes; Gabriel Dunajski Mendes; Bernardo Hey

Jovem Dionisio is a Brazilian musical group formed in 2019.

== History of the band ==
The band formed in Curitiba, Paraná in 2012 as a cover band named Huff who occasionally played together at school parties.

In 2019, they decided to produce their own music and named themselves after Senhor Dionisio, the owner of a bar where they used to meet.

Following their first work, the EP Dança entre casais, in 2020 they were put under contract by Sony Music Brazil. In 2022, they released their debut album Acorda Pedrinho, and its title song became a hit, ranking first both on Brazilian and Portuguese hit parade. The same year, they received five nominations at the 2022 Multishow Brazilian Music Award, including the awards for best group and best song ("Acorda Pedrinho").

== Style ==
The band's style has been described as 'half indie, half pop, some sort of tropical dream pop, organic and gracefully indolent and millimetrically clumsy'.

== Discography ==
- Dança entre casais (EP, 2019)
- Acorda, Pedrinho (2022)
- Ontem Eu Tinha Certeza (Hoje Eu Tenho Mais) (2024)
