= Anti-Herói =

2019 studio album by Jão

Studio album by Jão
- Released: 10 October 2019
- Studio: Head Media (São Paulo); Fibra (Rio de Janeiro)
- Genre: Pop
- Length: 31:22
- Language: Portuguese
- Label: Universal
- Producer: Jão; Los Brasileiros; Paul Ralphes

Jão chronology
Lobos (2018)	Anti-Herói (2019)	Pirata (2021)

Singles from Anti-Herói
- 1. "Enquanto Me Beija" Released: 8 October 2019; 2. "Essa Eu Fiz pro Nosso Amor" Released: 28 November 2019

Anti-Herói (transl. Anti-Hero) is the second studio album by Brazilian singer Jão. It was released on 10 October 2019, by Universal Music.

== Release and promotion ==
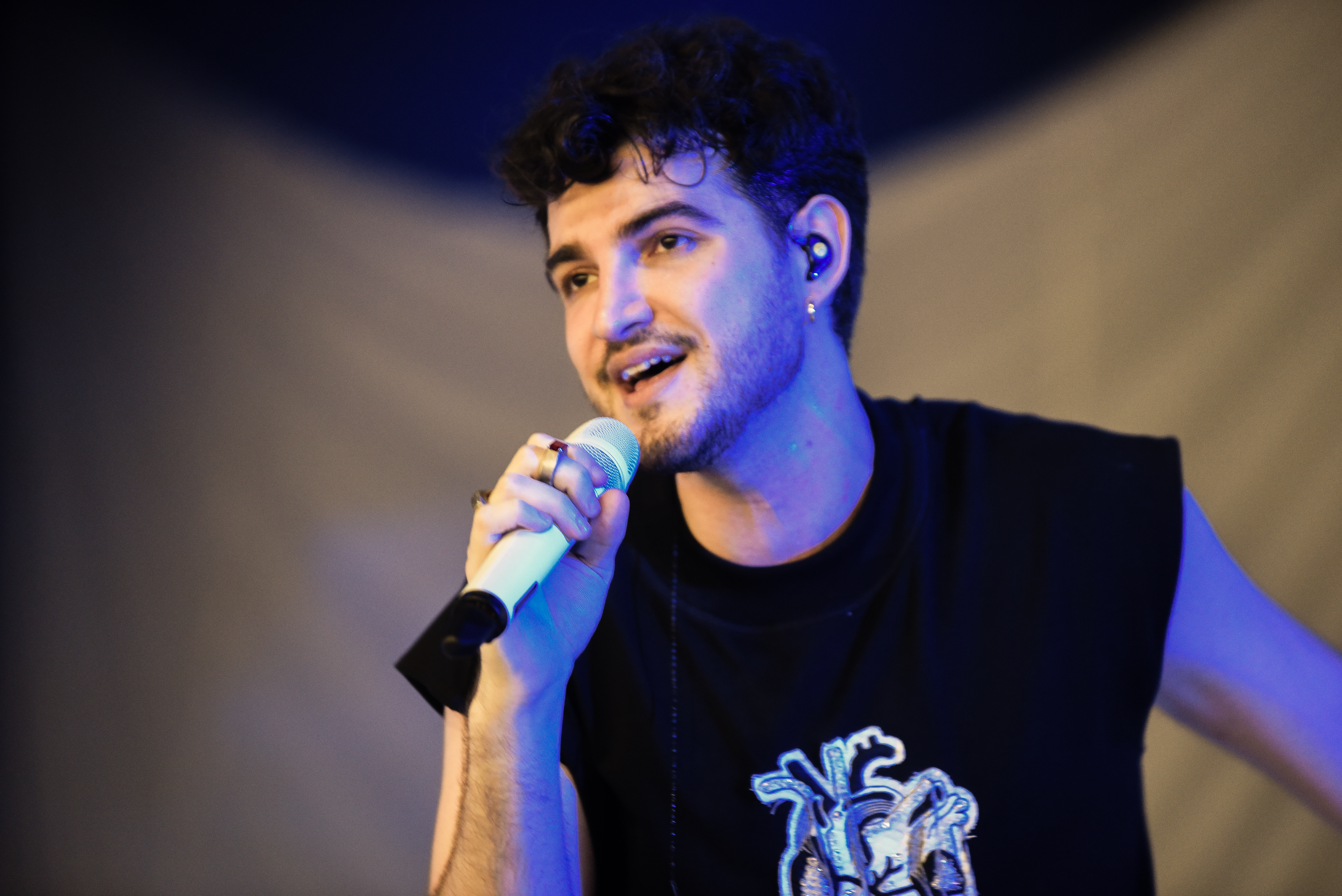
Jão on the Turnê Anti-Herói in 2019

Jão revealed the album's name on 2 October 2019. The cover art and the release date were revealed on 9 October. Anti-Herói was released on 10 October 2019, by Universal Music. Two songs were released as singles from the album; the lead single, "Enquanto Me Beija", was released on 8 October 2019. During an interview with Rádio Mix FM in November 2019, Jão confirmed "Essa Eu Fiz pro Nosso Amor" as the next single from the album. It was released as the album's second single on 28 November 2019. Jão announced the album's accompanying tour, Turnê Anti-Herói, shortly after the album's release. The tour began in October 2019 and concluded in March 2020, after being interrupted due to the COVID-19 pandemic. He released the live album Turnê Anti-Herói (Ao Vivo) on 28 July 2020.

== Reception ==
=== Critical ===
Henry Zatz from Nação da Música wrote that "Anti-Herói is a very good album, and Jão manages to showcase his talent already known from his previous works." He also praised the songwriting, stating that "it was truly very well done." The album was ranked number seven on Tracklist's list of the best national albums of 2019. Escutai's Diego Stedile ranked it 48th on list of 50 best national albums of the year.

=== Accolades ===
Organization	Year	Category	Result	Ref.
LGBT + Som Awards	2019	Best National Album	Nominated	

== Track listing ==
No.	Title	Writer(s)	Producer(s)	Length
1.	"A Última Noite"	André Jordão; Jão; Los Brasileiros; Pedro Tófani	Los Brasileiros; Jão	4:15
2.	"Triste pra Sempre"	Jão; Los Brasileiros; Tofani	Los Brasileiros; Jão	2:59
3.	"Enquanto Me Beija"	Jão; Tófani	Paul Ralphes; Jão	3:39
4.	"Essa Eu Fiz pro Nosso Amor"	Jão; Los Brasileiros; Tófani	Los Brasileiros; Jão	3:15
5.	"Fim de Festa"	Jão	Los Brasileiros; Jão	2:51
6.	"Barcelona"	Jordão; Jão; Los Brasileiros; Tófani	Los Brasileiros; Jão	3:25
7.	"Você Vai Me Destruir"	Jão; Los Brasileiros; Tófani	Los Brasileiros; Jão	3:05
8.	"VSF"	Jão; Pedro Calais; Tófani	Ralphes; Jão	3:57
9.	"Hotel San Diego"	Jão; Los Brasileiros; Tófani	Los Brasileiros; Jão	3:31
10.	":( (Nota de Voz 8)"	Jão	Los Brasileiros; Jão	2:25
Total length:				31:22

== Certifications ==
Certifications for Anti-Herói
Region	Certification	Certified units/sales
Brazil (Pro-Música Brasil)	Platinum	80,000^{‡}
^{‡} Sales+streaming figures based on certification alone.

== Release history ==
Release dates and formats for Anti-Herói
Region	Date	Format(s)	Label	Ref.
Various	10 October 2019	Digital download; streaming	Universal	
Brazil	31 January 2020	CD	Universal	
Brazil	3 November 2023	Vinyl LP	Universal	
