= Barra Funda =

Municipality in Rio Grande do Sul, Brazil

Coordinates: 27°55′22″S 53°02′20″W

- Municipality
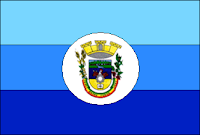
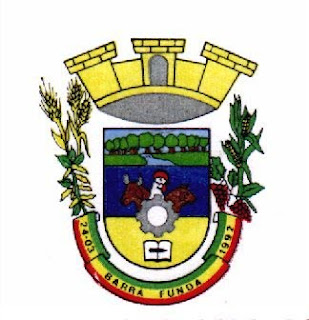
- Flag Coat of arms
- Interactive map of Barra Funda
- Country: Brazil
- Time zone: UTC−3 (BRT)

Barra Funda is a municipality in the state of Rio Grande do Sul, Brazil. As of 2020, the estimated population was 2,551.

Barra Funda began to be colonized in 1919 by colonizers from the region of Guaporé, Veranópolis and Caxias do Sul. Until then, the region was inhabited by the Guarani Indians.

The area was a point of low altitude used by cattle herders to cross a river, which gave rise to the name of the municipality.

== See also ==
- List of municipalities in Rio Grande do Sul
