= Criolo =

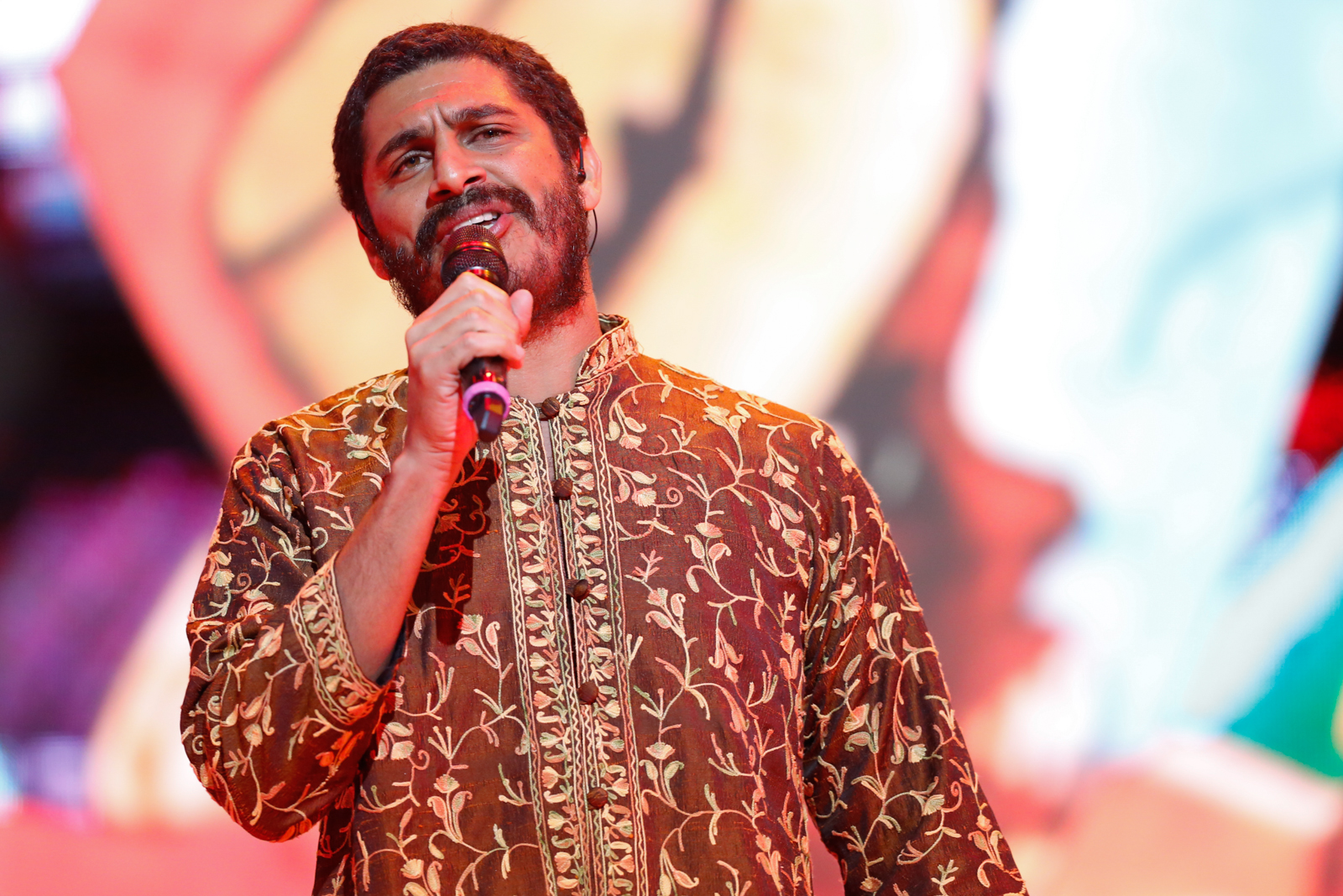

Background information
- Born: Kleber Cavalcante Gomes; September 5, 1975 (age 51)
- Origin: São Paulo, Brazil
- Genres: Afrobeat; hip hop; jazz; soul; MPB; samba-rock
- Occupations: Rapper; songwriter; singer
- Instrument: Phonic
- Years active: 1989-present

Kleber Cavalcante Gomes (born September 5, 1975), known professionally as Criolo (formerly Criolo Doido), is a Brazilian rapper, songwriter and singer who has been nominated for four Latin Grammy Awards. He began his career in 1989 and initially gained recognition in Brazil as the creator of Rinha dos MCs. However, he later achieved worldwide attention for his solo work, particularly the album Nó Na Orelha (2011).

In 2019, he was nominated for two Latin Grammy Awards, for "Boca de Lobo" (Best Music Video, Short Version) and "Etérea" (Best Song in Portuguese). In 2022, he was nominated again for two Latin Grammy Awards, for "Sobre Viver" (Best Rock or Alternative Album) and "Me Corte Na Boca Do Céu - A Morte Não Pede Perdão" (Best Song in Portuguese).

== Early life and career ==
Born to migrants from the North East of Brazil in the commercial hub of São Paulo, Criolo was born in the 'Favela das Imbuias', one of the many shanty towns that girdle the city.

Since the age of 11, Criolo concentrated on his love for rap, performing in small venues around his neighbourhood for many years before finally releasing his debut album ‘‘Ainda Há Tempo’’ in 2006. This led to a reputation as one of the most important rappers in São Paulo. In 2011, he released his second album, “Nó na Orelha”, which was produced by Daniel Ganjaman and Marcelo Cabral. "Nó na Orelha" was released internationally in 2012, thus spreading Criolo's popularity beyond São Paulo and Brazil to other countries, leading to live shows in Adelaide, Amsterdam, Berlin, Cannes, Dijon, Ghent, Glasgow, Leuven, Lisbon, Los Angeles, London, Manchester, New York, Ozark, Paris, Rome, Roskilde, Saint-Florent, Saint-Nazaire, San Isidro, Sete, and Vence.

His fourth album Espiral de Ilusão, focused on samba, was elected the 6th best Brazilian album of 2017 by the Brazilian edition of Rolling Stone. The album was accompanied by the first issue of Criolo magazine and Criolo was awarded best samba singer of the year by Brazilian Music Awards because of it. All his projects since 2010 are released by his record label, Oloko Records, by his manager Beatriz Berjeaut, and his music director, Daniel Ganjaman.

In 2018, Criolo released Boca de Lobo as single and music video (directed by Denis Cisma and Pedro Inoue). The following year, he launched the Etérea project, an electronic beat song made as a homage to the Brazilian underground queer culture. Etérea music video (directed by Gil Inoue and Gabriel Dietrich) was released with a behind the scenes mini documentary with interviews with the performers and the whole project had creative direction by Tino Monetti and Pedro Inoue. Both singles, with executive production by Kler Correa, were nominated to the Latin Grammy Awards 2019, as Best Music Video, Short Version and Best Song In Portuguese, respectively.

In May 5, 2022, Criolo released his fifth studio album, Sobre Viver, with 10 new unreleased tracks. Each track is represented by a different color instead of having a live music video. The album, featuring Tropkillaz, Mayra Andrade, Liniker, Milton Nascimento, MC Hariel and his mother Maria Vilani, also was completed by the release of Criolo magazine number two, a companion online publication made by Oloko Records and produced by The Codex studio.

== Discography ==
- Ainda Há Tempo (2006) - (There's Still Time).
- Nó Na Orelha (2011) - (Knot in the Ear).
- Convoque Seu Buda (2014) - (Summon Your Buddha).
- Espiral de Ilusão (2017) - (Spiral of illusion).
- Sobre Viver (2022) - (About Living).

=== DVDs ===
- Criolo Doido Live in SP (2010)
- Criolo & Emicida ao Vivo (2013)
- Nó Na Orelha ao Vivo no Circo Voador (2013)

=== LP Singles ===
- Ainda Há Tempo (2006)
- Subirusdoistiozin (2010)
- Duas De Cinco (2013)
- Viva Tim Maia (2015)
- No Sapatinho (2016)
- Até amanhã (2016)
- Menino Mimado (2017)
- Povo Guerreiro (2018)
- Boca de Lobo (2018)
- Etérea (2019)

== Awards and nominations ==
=== MTV Video Music Brasil ===
| Year | Category | Nomination | Result |
|---|---|---|---|
| 2011 | Video of the Year | Subirusdoistiozin | Nominated |
| 2011 | Artist of the Year | Criolo | Nominated |
| 2011 | Album of the Year | Nó na Orelha | Won |
| 2011 | Music of the Year | Não Existe Amor em SP | Won |
| 2011 | Breakthrough artist | Criolo | Won |
| 2012 | Video of the Year | Mariô | Nominated |
| 2012 | Male artist | Criolo | Won |

=== Brazilian Music Awards ===
| Year | Category | Nomination | Result |
|---|---|---|---|
| 2018 | Samba singer | Criolo - Espiral de Ilusão | Won |

=== Latin Grammy Awards ===
| Year | Category | Nomination | Result |
|---|---|---|---|
| 2019 | Best Music Video, Short Version | Boca de Lobo | Nominated |
| 2019 | Best Song In Portuguese | Etérea | Nominated |

| Year | Category | Nomination | Result |
|---|---|---|---|
| 2022 | Best Song In Portuguese Language | Me Corte Na Boca Do Céu - A Morte Não Pede Perdão | Nominated |
| 2022 | Best Rock or Alternative Album | Sobre Viver | Nominated |
