= Jão =

Brazilian musician (born 1994)

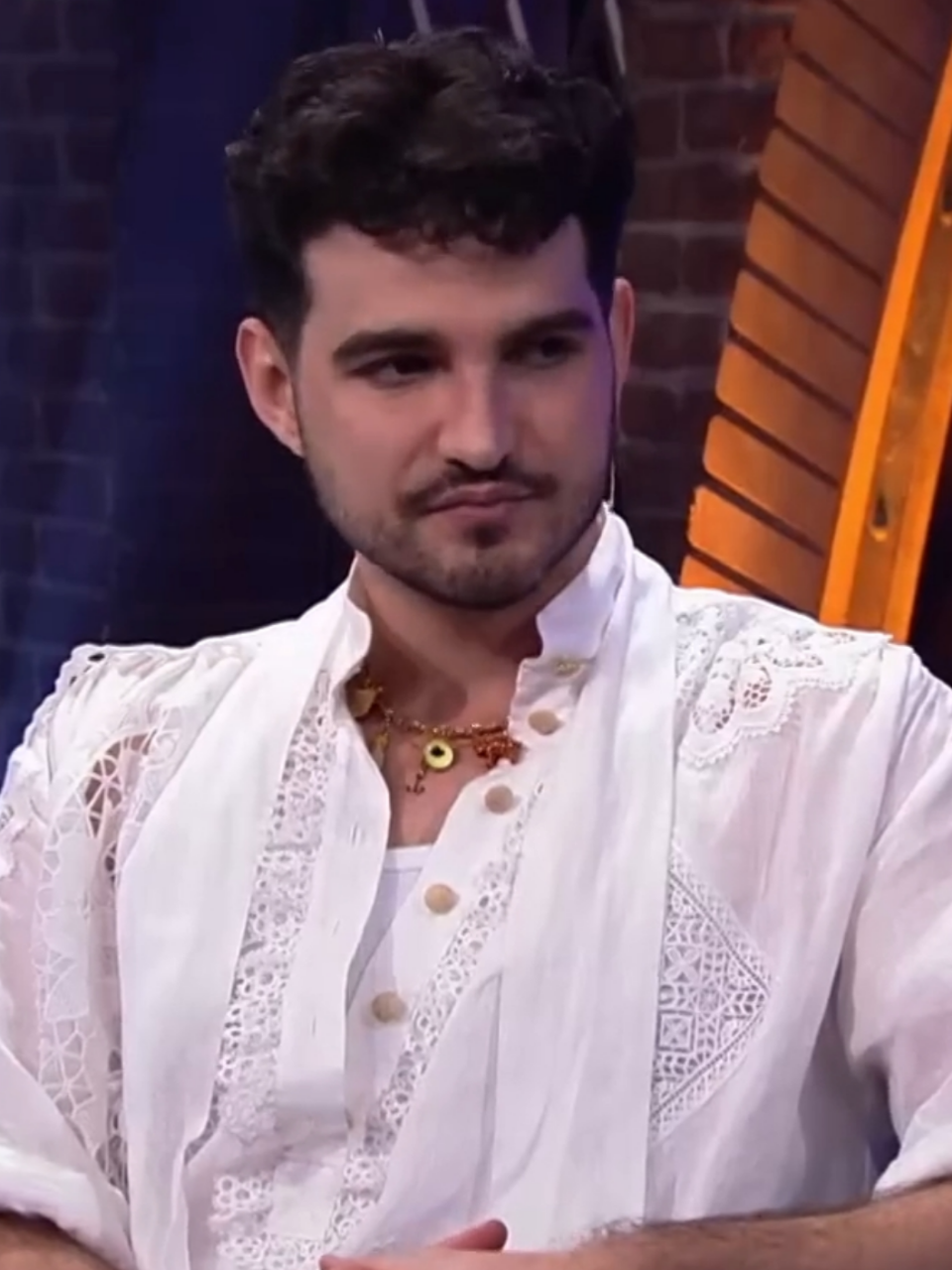
- Jão in 2022
- Born: João Vitor Romania Balbino; 3 November 1994 (age 31); Américo Brasiliense, São Paulo, Brazil
- Education: University of São Paulo
- Occupation: Singer-songwriter
- Years active: 2016–present
- Partner: Pedro Tófani (2014–present)
- Musical career
- Genres: Pop; Dance Pop; MPB
- Instruments: Vocals; guitar; keyboard; flute
- Labels: Head Media; Universal
- Website: sitedojao.com

Signature
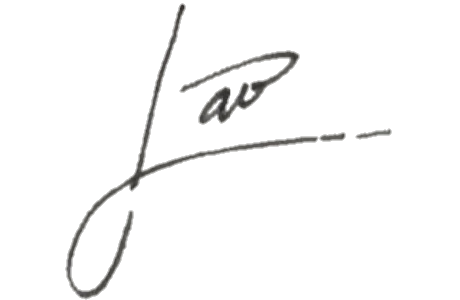

João Vitor Romania Balbino (born 3 November 1994), known professionally as Jão, is a Brazilian singer-songwriter.

== Career ==
=== 2016–2018: Career beginnings and first album ===
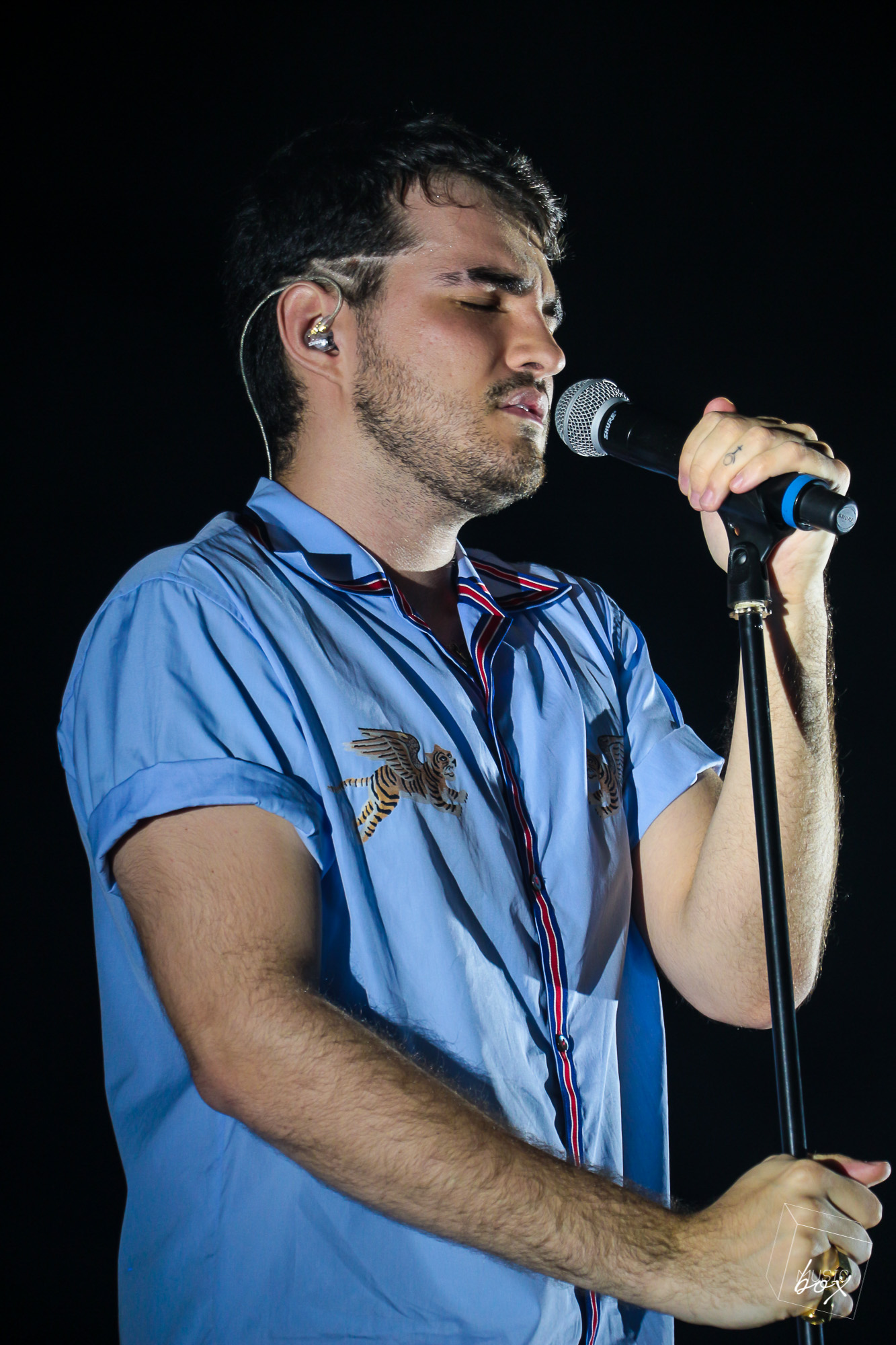
Jão performing at the tour Turnê Lobos in 2018

Jão started posting YouTube videos of him singing covers of popular songs in 2016. His covers caught the attention of Brazilian music producers Pedro Dash and Marcelinho Ferraz. Soon after, he signed a contract with Head Media, a Universal Music Group subsidiary. In November 2016, Jão released his debut single, "Dança pra Mim", with Pedrowl. In February 2017, Jão featured in the remix of "Medo Bobo". In October 2017, Jão released the singles "Ressaca" and "Álcool". Its music videos were directed by Gabriel Dietrich. In December 2017, Jão featured in "Só Love", a song by Seakret and Buchecha. In January 2018, Jão released an EP with 4 remixes by Zebu, Goldcash, E-Cologyk and Seakret for "Ressaca".

On January 17, 2018, Jão released "Imaturo". A music video for the song directed by Pedro Tófani was released on January 23. The song reached number one on Spotify's Viral Brasil chart. In Brazil, the song received a diamond certificate. In February 2018, Jão featured in Collab, a project by the band Jota Quest, on the track "Amor Maior". In June 2018, Jão released his debut EP titled Primeiro Acústico. On August 14, 2018, Jão released "Vou Morrer Sozinho" as the lead single from his debut album Lobos.

Lobos was released on August 17, 2018. On December 13, "Me Beija com Raiva" was released as the album's second and final single. The Lobos Tour lasted from September 2018 to June 2019. At the 2018 MTV Millennial Awards Brazil, Jão won in the #Prestatenção category. At the Prêmio Jovem Brasileiro 2018, Jão was nominated for Best Singer. Rolling Stone Brasil placed Lobos at number 49 on its list of "the 50 best national albums of 2018", writing: "The national pop is very well served. With Lobos, Jão suffers from love as she glides over beats, synths and bases that invite dance—and make the eyes fill with tears".

=== 2019–2020: Anti-Herói ===
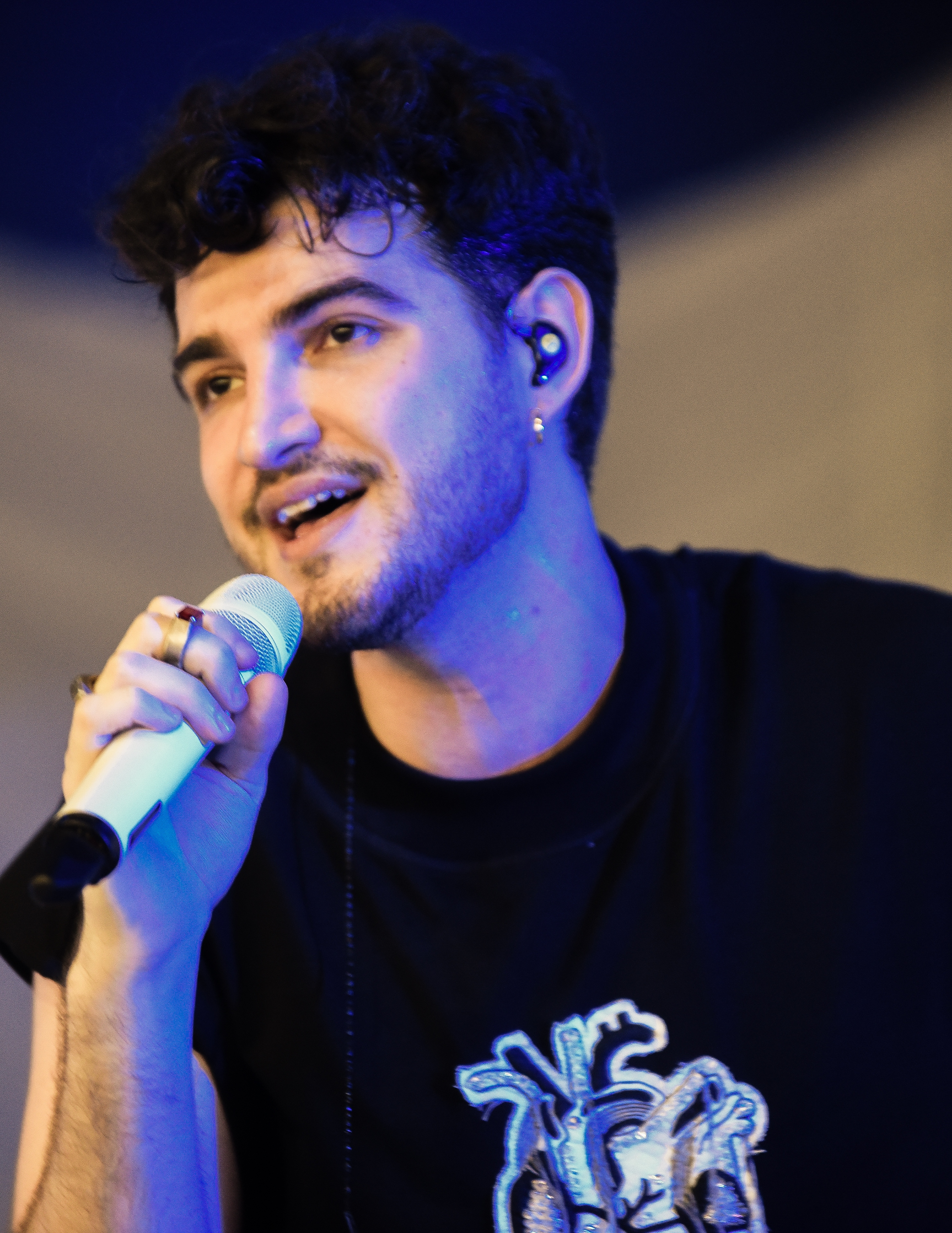
Jão performing at the tour Turnê Anti-Herói in 2019

In February 2019, Jão stated that he would release his second album that year. In April 2019, Jão and Malía released the song "Dilema" from Escuta, Malía's debut album. In May 2019, Jão featured in "A Boba Fui Eu", a song from Ludmilla's third live album and studio album Hello Mundo. In the same month, he featured in the song "Andar Sozinho" from Lagum's second album, Coisas da Geração. In June 2019, Jão appeared at São João da Thay, organized by Brazilian digital influencer Thaynara OG. In the same month, he launched an audiovisual project of the tour Turnê Lobos. Jão was nominated for two categories at the 2019 MTV Millennial Awards Brazil, namely Arrasa no Style, and his single "Me Beija com Raiva" being nominated for Video of the Year.

In July 2019, Jão released the single "Louquinho", initially intended as the lead single from their second album. Jão officially unveiled the title of his second studio album, Anti-Herói, in October 2019. In the same month, Jão released "Enquanto Me Beija" as the album's lead single. Anti-Herói was released on October 10, 2019. At the 2019 Prêmio Multishow de Música Brasileira, Jão was nominated in Fiat Argo Experimente. In November 2019, "Essa Eu Fiz pro Nosso Amor" was released as the album's second single. At the Prêmio Contigo! Online 2019, Jão was nominated in Musical Revelation.

The tour Turnê Anti-Herói lasted from October 2019 to February 2020. In April 2020, Jão performed in a live show on YouTube, where he sang several songs. In May 2020, Jão and Ivete Sangalo released "Me Liga". In June 2020, Jão featured in "Dúvida", a song from Vitor Kley's fourth studio album, A Bolha. In July 2020, Jão released a live album, Turnê Anti-Herói (Ao Vivo). In September 2020, Jão performed at Menos30 Fest, a project organized by Globo to promote entrepreneurial education. In November, Jão presented a tribute to Brazilian singer Cazuza at the 2020 Prêmio Multishow de Música Brasileira. Jão also performed "Vou Morrer Sozinho" and "Essa Eu Fiz pro Nosso Amor".

=== 2021–present: Pirata ===
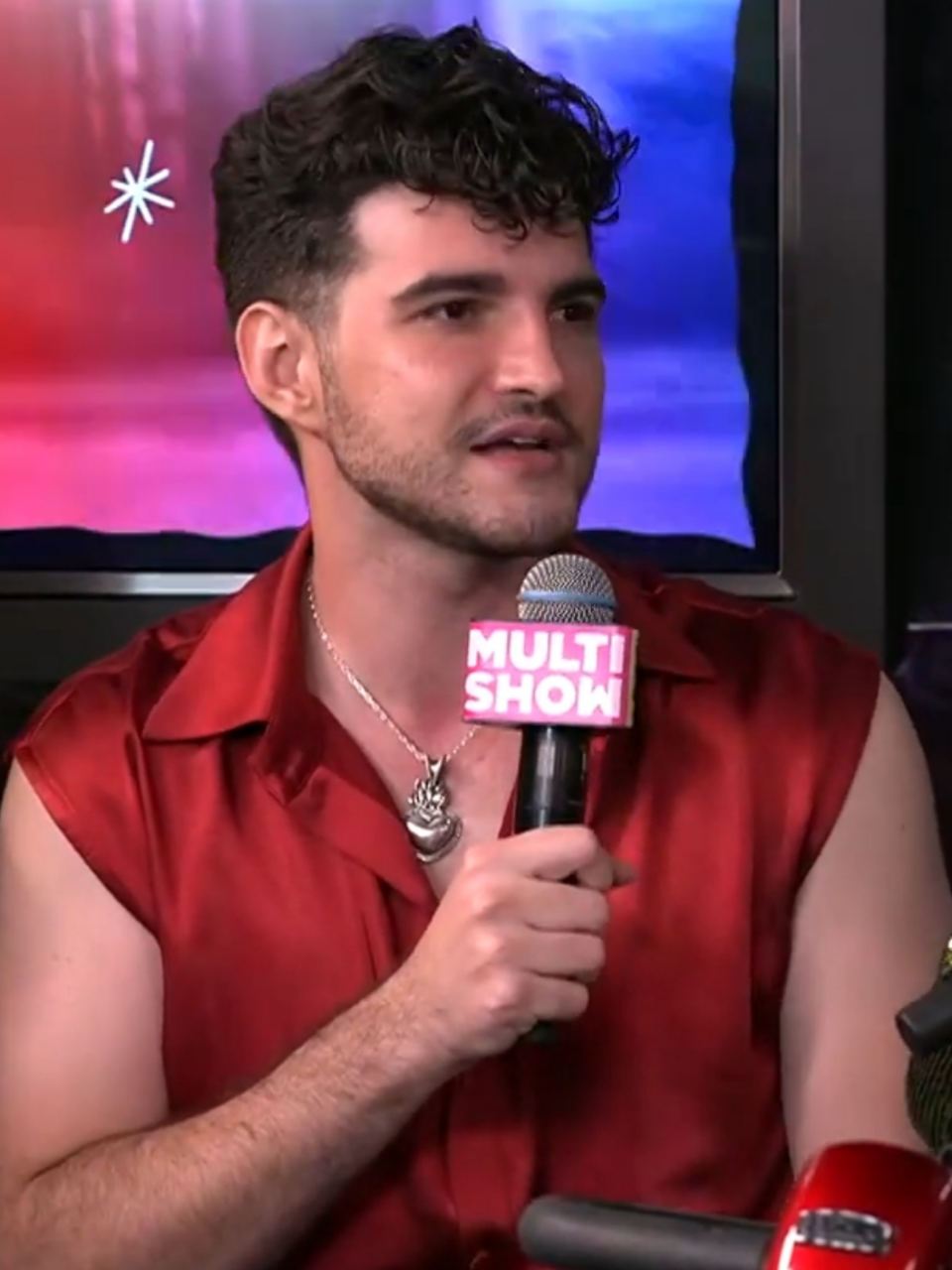
Jão in 2022

On February 24, 2021, Jão released "Coringa" as the lead single from his third studio album Pirata. A week later, he released "Amor Pirata" as a promotional single. Pirate was released on October 19, 2021. The album's second single, "Não Te Amo", was released in conjunction with the album. On November 2, 2021, Luísa Sonza and Jão released "Fugitivos :)", a song from Sonza's second studio album, Doce 22. On November 16, Jão performed at a live show on TikTok, where he sang several songs by Pirata, as well as some previous singles, such as "Me Beija com Raiva", "Imaturo", and "Essa Eu Fiz pro Nosso Amor". On February 9, 2022, "Idiota" was released as the third single from Pirata, with an accompanying music video directed by Pedro Tófani.

In support of Pirata, he embarked on his tour Turnê Pirata, which began in March 2022. On April 5, 2022, he was the opening act for the American band Maroon 5 at Allianz Parque, playing to over 45,000 people. This was the first time he had performed in a stadium.

== Personal life ==
Jão is openly bisexual and is in a relationship with Pedro Tófani.

== Discography ==
Studio albums

- Lobos (2018)
- Anti-Herói (2019)
- Pirata (2021)
- Super (2023)
- Memórias Póstumas (2026)

== Tours ==
- Lobos Tour (2018–2019)
- Anti-Herói Tour (2019–2020)
- Pirata Tour (2022)
- Superturnê (2024–2025)
- Turnê de Natal (2024)
- Memórias Postumas Tour (2026–2027)
