= Big Brother Brasil 26 =

- Season 26
- Hosted by: Tadeu Schmidt
- No. of days: 100
- No. of housemates: 25
- Winner: Ana Paula Renault
- Runner-up: Milena Moreira
- Companion shows: Rede BBB; Mesa Cast
- No. of episodes: 100

Release
- Original network: TV Globo; Multishow; Globoplay
- Original release: January 12 – April 21, 2026

Season chronology
- ← Previous; Big Brother Brasil 25

Big Brother Brasil 26 (Note: Also referred to as BBB 26.) was the twenty-sixth season of the Brazilian reality show Big Brother Brasil, broadcast by TV Globo from 12 January to 21 April 2026. The season was hosted by journalist Tadeu Schmidt, with general direction by Mário Marcondes, artistic direction by Angélica Campos, and genre direction by Rodrigo Dourado.

The season featured 100 days of confinement, tied with seasons 21 through 25 as the longest-running editions of the reality show. It was the first season to feature a mix of anonymous contestants (Pipoca), celebrities (Camarote), and returning housemates (Veteranos) in the cast. It was also the edition with the highest number of contestants leaving the show without facing the public vote, with one medical withdrawal (Henri Castelli), one walkout (Pedro Espíndola), and three disqualifications (Paulo Augusto, Sol Vega, and Edílson Capetinha, respectively).

The season concluded with journalist and former Big Brother Brasil 16 housemate Ana Paula Renault winning with 75.94% of the vote, taking home the tax-free grand prize of R$ 5.7 million—the largest in the show's history—along with a Geely EX5 EM-i hybrid car and an apartment. She became the second veteran and the oldest contestant to win the show. BBB 26 was marked by having the highest social media engagement since Big Brother Brasil 21, recording three times higher growth compared to BBB 25 and twice that of BBB 24, despite receiving the second-lowest average broadcast television ratings in the show's history. Additionally, advertising revenue for the season was estimated at R$ 1.5 billion.

== Broadcast ==
The series is broadcast daily on TV Globo in free-to-air format and on Multishow via subscription television, with live 1-hour segments after the main show's conclusion on free-to-air TV. Continuous live feeds coverage is available through the pay-per-view (PPV) service exclusively on Globoplay for Globo.com subscribers.

== The game ==
=== Housemates ===
Applications for Big Brother Brasil 26 started on April 17, 2025, during the broadcast of Big Brother Brasil 25.

This season's twist reused the format from the past few seasons, with housemates now being divided into three groups: Civilians (everyday Brazilians), Celebrities (notable media personalities), and Veterans (past housemates).

=== BBB Selection ===
The Glass House twist, in which housemate prospects are displayed in a shopping mall to compete for a spot in the cast, was taken to a whole other level this season. Around the five regions of the country, 20 housemates went through a public vote, with two men and two women in each Glass House competing for a spot in the cast.

The voting happened from January 9 to 11, with special broadcasts every night on TV Globo. On the night of the 11th, the housemates chosen by the audience to compose the cast were revealed, with the losers being separated once again to await further chances of making the cast.

North Region
Name	Age	Occupation	Hometown	Result	Ref.
Livia Christina Ribeiro Castro	26	Dancer	Parintins, Amazonas	Not chosen	
Marciele Albuquerque da Silva	32	Dancer	Juruti, Pará	Chosen	
Brigido Torres Nogueira Neto	34	Businessman and school principal	Manaus, Amazonas	Chosen	
Ricardo Fabiano Chahini de Araujo (Ricardinho)	27	Professional athlete of freestyle soccer	Belém, Pará	Not chosen	

Northeast Region
Name	Age	Occupation	Hometown	Result	Ref.
Maxiane Rodrigues da Silva	32	Digital influencer	Nazaré da Mata, Pernambuco	Chosen	
Rafaella Fernandes de Farias Lima	29	Occupational therapist and veterinary student	Maceió, Alagoas	Not chosen	
Leandro Rocha	42	Cultural producer	Salvador, Bahia	Not chosen	
Marcelo Alves de Araujo Filho	31	Doctor	Currais Novos, Rio Grande do Norte	Chosen	

Central-West Region
Name	Age	Occupation	Hometown	Result	Ref.
Chaiany Pinto de Andrade	25	Unemployed	São João d'Aliança, Goiás	Not chosen	
Jordana Ribeiro Morais	29	Lawyer and model	Paraíso do Tocantins, Tocantins	Chosen	
Paulo Augusto Carvalhaes	21	Veterinary student and digital influencer	Inhumas, Goiás	Chosen	
Ricardo Negro	35	Model and dancer	Niquelândia, Goiás	Not chosen	

Southeast Region
Name	Age	Occupation	Hometown	Result	Ref.
Gabriela Saporito de Almeida	21	Psychology student and street vendor	São Paulo, São Paulo	Not chosen	
Milena Moreira Lages	26	Babysitter & kids’ party entertainer	Itambacuri, Minas Gerais	Chosen	
Breno Rangel Moreira Corã	33	Biologist and model	Contagem, Minas Gerais	Chosen	
Marcel Felipe de Lucena	35	Lawyer	Catanduva, São Paulo	Walked	

South Region
Name	Age	Occupation	Hometown	Result	Ref.
Elisa Fagundes Klein	28	Model	Canoas, Rio Grande do Sul	Not chosen	
Samira Nasser Said Sagr	25	Bartender	São Jerônimo, Rio Grande do Sul	Chosen	
Matheus Moreira	25	Banker and boxing coach	Porto Alegre, Rio Grande do Sul	Not chosen	
Pedro Henrique Espindola	22	Street vendor	Colombo, Paraná	Chosen	

=== White Room ===
On premiere night, however, it was then revealed that the 9 housemates not chosen would compete in an endurance test in the infamous White Room. At first, it was announced that only the two housemates who lasted the longest would earn spots in the cast. This number was later increased to three on Friday, following the removal of Celeb Henri Castelli for medical reasons. Eventually, it was further expanded to four due to health concerns for the remaining contestants, who had surpassed the 100-hour mark in the room.

Name	Age	Hometown	Occupation	Day entered	Day exited	Result
Chaiany Andrade	25	São João d'Aliança	Unemployed	1	7	Winners
Gabriela Saporito	21	São Paulo	Psychology student and street vendor	1	7	Winners
Leandro Rocha	42	Salvador	Cultural producer	1	7	Winners
Matheus Moreira	25	Porto Alegre	Banker and boxing coach	1	7	Winners
Rafaella Lima	29	Maceió	Occupational therapist and veterinary student	1	7	Withdrew
Ricardo Negro	35	Niquelândia	Model and dancer	1	6	Evicted
Livia Christina	26	Parintins	Dancer	1	5	Evicted
Elisa Klein	28	Canoas	Model	1	4	Evicted
Ricardinho Chahini	27	Belém	Professional athlete of freestyle soccer	1	2	Evicted

=== Voting System ===
The voting system remains the same as used since Big Brother Brasil 24, with a couple of changes. Besides the unlimited online votes (called the Fan Vote), the viewers would have the option to cast only one vote using their CPF, the Brazilian equivalent to a Social Security Number (called the Sole Vote). This season, however, the Fan Vote would have a weighted average of 30%, and the Sole Vote an average of 70%, following audience complaints that the results of the past few seasons (in particular the wins of Amanda Meirelles in Big Brother Brasil 23 and Renata Saldanha in Big Brother Brasil 25) did not accurately reflect the opinion of the masses.

=== Prize ===
This season, the prize is, unlike previous seasons, fixed at R$ 5,4 million, the biggest in the history of the show and of all Big Brother seasons around the world, being displayed to the house in the living room.

=== Big Sincere ===
This season, the Big Sincere used since Big Brother Brasil 24 continues, airing every Monday. Originally intended to be done only by the protagonists of the week (the Head of Household, Power of Immunity holder, and the nominees), it was now expanded to include all participants, with only a selected few appearing on the live broadcast and the remainder appearing at the Pay-per-view stream.

Host Tadeu Schmidt will ask questions based on the topics selected by housemates. Usually, confrontations are limited to a maximum of 60 seconds, and a chance to respond, when given, is limited to 30 seconds. This season, a live studio audience may suggest questions to the host, and vote for a specific contestant in a given question (e.g. "who was the best/worst this week", "who is invisible at the game").

=== The HoH's Crosshairs ===
After the result of the HoH's competition, the winner of the competition will take part in "The HoH's Crosshairs" twist, where they are required to hand out a pre-determined number of wristbands to housemates they are considering nominating on Sunday night. The HoH must then choose their nomination for eviction among the housemates pre-selected, without any room to change their minds.

While intended to continue as the season-long twist it has been since Big Brother Brasil 24, the limiting nature of the twist was wildly panned by the audience, leading to it being discontinued following Week 1.

Week	HoH(s)	Chosen housemates	Nominated
1	Alberto	Breno; Maxiane; Milena; Paulo; Samira	Milena

=== Big Phone ===
There'll be three Big Phones in different places of the house, with the public being allowed to vote for which one is going to ring, unleashing good or bad consequences on the nomination process.

Week	Housemate	Big Phone	Date	Time (BRT)	Consequences
1	Marcelo	Golden	January 15, 2026	Friday; 11:05 p.m.	See note 4
3	Breno	Silver	January 29, 2026	Thursday; 10:30 p.m.	See note 8
3	Babu	Silver	January 30, 2026	Friday; 10:05 a.m.	See note 10
3	Marcelo	Golden	January 30, 2026	Friday; 11:05 p.m.	See note 10
3	Juliano	Blue	January 31, 2026	Saturday; 11:05 p.m.	See note 10
6	Chaiany	Blue	February 21, 2026	Saturday; 11:05 p.m.	See note 16
11 (Day 77)	Milena	Golden	March 29, 2026	Sunday; 3:55 p.m.	See note 18

=== The Counterattack ===
The Counterattack is a power occasionally given to a nominee, granting them the opportunity to nominate an additional housemate for eviction, effectively dragging another player to the block with them. While viewers are informed when the power will be featured in advance (on Thursdays before the Head of Household competition even takes place), the housemates are only informed about the twist on the spot.

Week	Housemate	Status	Used on	Result
1	Aline	Big Phone's nominee	Ana Paula	See note 5
4	Babu	Head of Household's nominee	Sarah	See note 12
6	Chaiany	Risky Duel's nominee	Maxiane	See note 17

=== Win-wins ===
Since Week 2, the Win-wins, a Mercado Pago-sponsored twist, was added, in which three randomly selected housemates get the chance to either win R$20,000 or win half of said value in exchange for exclusive information about the upcoming week's events. The three housemates go to a secret room, and each one chooses an envelope, deciding whether to leave or stay. The person chosen to leave must also veto someone from continuing in the activity. The remaining person can choose between winning R$20,000 or winning R$10,000 and exclusive information.

=== Surprise boxes ===
On January 22, Week 2, five boxes with different effects were placed in the backyard of the house. The first housemate to touch the box must open it, receive the consequence inside it, and choose another housemate to open the second box, and so on.

Week	Housemate	Consequence	Result
2	Alberto	Both housemates would nominate another housemate in consensus.	Leandro was nominated.
2	Brigido	Both housemates would nominate another housemate in consensus.	Leandro was nominated.
2	Ana Paula	Housemate would have their vote doubled that week.	Ana Paula's vote was not doubled because she was later vetoed.
2	Jonas	Housemate would not vote that week.	Jonas was vetoed.
2	Sarah	Housemate would veto someone from voting that week.	Ana Paula was vetoed.

=== Risky Duel ===
Introduced in Week 4, the Risky Duel is an occasional twist that gives housemates a chance to face one of their targets in a logic-based game, where both are given a chance at immunity and face the risk of being nominated. Unbeknownst to the cast, the answers they provide in small midweek Big Sinceres (usually on Fridays) are later used for the twists.

Week	Dilemma	Game	Housemate	Target	Result
4	Who would you most like to face on a block? Housemates are asked who they would like to face on eviction. A name chosen by random draw will face off against its intended target.	The two housemates participate in a Prisoner’s Dilemma–style scenario in which each privately selects one of two cards: 'Immunity' or 'Nominate'. The outcomes are as follows: If one housemate selects 'Immunity' and the other selects 'Nominate', the latter will be nominated alone.; If both choose 'Immunity', both are nominated.; If both choose 'Nominate', they must jointly agree on another housemate to nominate.	Sol	Juliano	Sol and Juliano both choose 'Nominate', and agree on nominating Samira.
6	What's your dream-scenario block? Housemates are asked the 3 people they would like to see on the block, with the person who answers the Big Phone being required to choose one of their targets to face off in a duel.	The two housemates participate in a Monty Hall problem, where the person who answered the Big Phone must choose between two boxes, one containing 'Immunity', and one containing 'Nomination'. Following a one-minute debate, the second person must decide whether to keep their original box or switch it for their opponent's.	Chaiany	Jordana	Chaiany picks the box containing 'Nomination' and fails to convince Jordana to switch with her, being nominated, while Jordana receives immunity.

=== Block's Carnival ===
On February 13, Week 5, as an event celebrating the Brazilian Carnival, several carnival props were handed to the housemates, and each person would choose one of them. Unbeknownst to them, seven of these would have consequences for their users.

Week	Housemate	Consequence	Result
5	Babu	Both housemates would give immunity to another housemate in consensus.	Milena was immunized.
5	Juliano	Both housemates would give immunity to another housemate in consensus.	Milena was immunized.
5	Samira	Housemate must switch someone from the 'Have's group with someone from the 'Have-Not's group.	Ana Paula was moved to the 'Have's and Edílson was moved to the 'Have-Not's.
5	Leandro	Housemate must veto someone from voting on the week's block.	Alberto was vetoed.
5	Alberto	The three housemates would nominate another housemate in consensus.	The three housemates were nominated as they failed to reach a consensus.
5	Breno	The three housemates would nominate another housemate in consensus.	The three housemates were nominated as they failed to reach a consensus.
5	Solange	The three housemates would nominate another housemate in consensus.	The three housemates were nominated as they failed to reach a consensus.

=== Power Machine ===
Introduced in Week 6, the power machine allowed the housemates to buy advantages or mysterious items using the game's currency. In Week 6, the machine appeared on February 18, at 11 am, offering surprise boxes for various prices. The main surprise box allowed its buyer to veto someone from participating in the Return from the Block competition. In Week 9, the machine reappeared on March 8, offering as the main prize the power to take someone off the block.

=== Risk Triangle ===
Similar to the ''Risk Duel'', the ''Risk Triangle'' was a two-part twist. In the first part, the four contestants with the worst performance in the first stage of the Head of Household competition held on March 19, 2026, Chaiany, Juliano, Leandro, and Samira, were asked to gather the following day (20) and each choose one of four boxes, only one of which contained a white bracelet that granted a direct nomination to the eviction vote. Leandro selected the correct box. In the second part, held hours after the Angel competition on March 21, the contestant who had obtained the bracelet (Leandro) was given the right to choose two contestants (excluding the Head of Household) to participate in the twist; he selected Jonas and Jordana. In this stage, the nominated contestant hid the bracelet inside one of the three boxes and negotiated possible swaps with the selected contestants, who did the same. If a swap was accepted, the contestants exchanged boxes and, on Tadeu's command, opened them. Whoever ended up with the white bracelet would face eviction. In this case, Leandro swapped boxes with Jordana, causing her to become the new nominee.

=== Dream of Power ===
The ''Dream of Power'' twist, held on April 12, 2026, was a special segment aired during the first commercial break of ''Domingão com Huck'' and had a major impact on that week's eviction vote. Each contestant selected a ''sonho'' (a filled doughnut pastry), each with a different color and flavor. Only one of them was designated as the ''Dream of Power'', determined by a public vote. Viewers voted until 6:25 p.m. to decide which flavor would grant the special power. The contestant who chose the winning pastry would earn the right to nominate someone for eviction, but would only discover this during the live nomination ceremony, after ''Fantástico''. The public selected the Caramel Dream (''doce de leite'') as the ''Dream of Power'', which had been chosen by Jordana during the twist. As a result, later that evening, she earned the right to nominate a contestant for eviction in addition to the Head of Household nomination, which she had also won that same day.

== Housemates ==
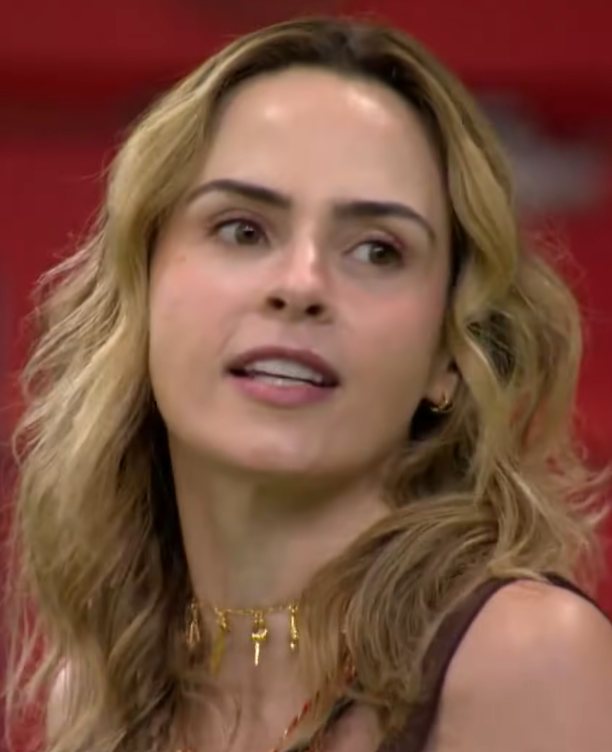
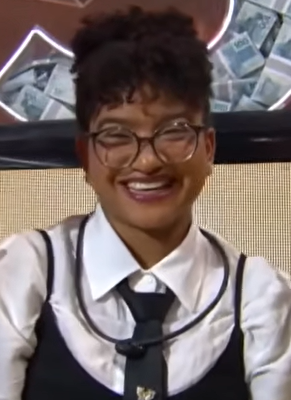
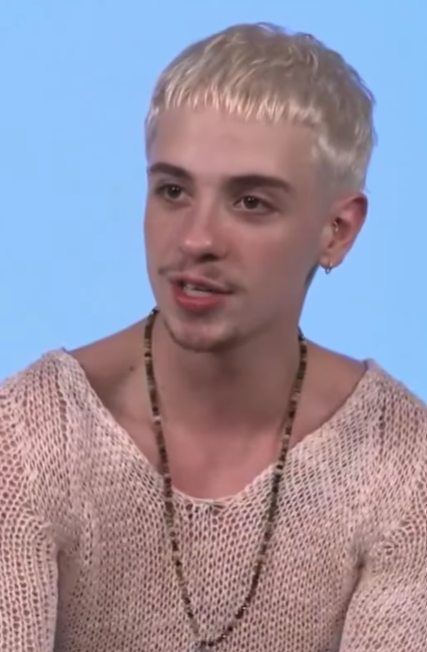
Ana Paula Renault (Winner), Milena Moreira (Runner-up) and Juliano Floss (Third place), the finalists of Big Brother Brasil 26.

The 20 potential housemates who competed for the ten spots in the Civilian group were revealed on January 9, 2026, during commercial breaks on Globo's programming. The housemates in the Celebrity and Veteran groups were announced at the season premiere on January 12, 2026.

Name	Age	Type	Hometown	Occupation	Day entered	Day exited	Result
Ana Paula Renault; Big Brother Brasil 16	44	Veteran	Belo Horizonte	Journalist	1	100	Winner
Milena Moreira	26	Civilian	Itambacuri	Babysitter & kids' party entertainer	1	100	Runner-up
Juliano Floss	21	Celebrity	Pinhalzinho	Dancer & digital influencer	1	100	Third place
Leandro Rocha	42	Civilian	Salvador	Cultural producer	7	98	17th Evicted
Jordana Morais	29	Civilian	Paraíso do Tocantins	Lawyer & model	1	95	16th Evicted
Gabriela Saporito	21	Civilian	São Paulo	Psychology student and street vendor	7	93	15th Evicted
Marciele Albuquerque	32	Civilian	Juruti	Dancer	1	91	14th Evicted
Samira Sagr	25	Civilian	São Jerônimo	Bartender	1	86	13th Evicted
Chaiany Andrade	25	Civilian	São João d'Aliança	Unemployed	7	84	12th Evicted
Solange Couto	69	Celebrity	Rio de Janeiro	Actress	1	79	11th Evicted
Alberto Cowboy Big Brother Brasil 7	49	Veteran	Manhuaçu	Businessman	1	77	10th Evicted
Jonas Sulzbach Big Brother Brasil 12	39	Veteran	Lajeado	Model	1	72	9th Evicted
Breno Corã	33	Civilian	Contagem	Biologist & model	1	65	8th Evicted
Babu Santana Big Brother Brasil 20	46	Veteran	Rio de Janeiro	Actor	1	58	7th Evicted
Maxiane Rodrigues	31	Civilian	Nazaré da Mata	Digital influencer	1	44	6th Evicted
Marcelo Alves	31	Civilian	Currais Novos	Doctor	1	37	5th Evicted
Edílson Capetinha	55	Celebrity	Salvador	Former soccer player	1	34	3rd Ejected
Sol Vega Big Brother Brasil 4	47	Veteran	Mogi Guaçu	Actress & businesswoman	1	31	2nd Ejected
Sarah Andrade Big Brother Brasil 21	34	Veteran	Brasília	Influencer	1	30	4th Evicted
Brigido Neto	34	Civilian	Manaus	Businessman & school principal	1	23	3rd Evicted
Paulo Augusto Carvalhaes	21	Civilian	Inhumas	Veterinary student & digital influencer	1	19	1st Ejected
Matheus Moreira	25	Civilian	Porto Alegre	Banker and boxing coach	7	16	2nd Evicted
Aline Campos	38	Celebrity	Rio de Janeiro	Actress & businesswoman	1	9	1st Evicted
Pedro Espíndola	22	Civilian	Colombo	Street vendor	1	7	Walked
Henri Castelli	47	Celebrity	São Paulo	Actor	1	3	Walked

== Voting history ==
Key
Civilians
Celebrities
Veterans
White Room Civilians

	Week 0		Week 1		Week 2	Week 3	Week 4	Week 5	Week 6	Week 7	Week 8	Week 9	Week 10	Week 11		Week 12		Week 13		Week 14		
	Glass House		White Room	Day 7	Week 2	Week 3	Week 4	Week 5	Week 6	Week 7	Week 8	Week 9	Week 10	Day 75	Day 77	Day 82	Day 84	Day 89	Day 91	Day 93	Day 96	Finale
Head of Household	(none)			Alberto	Babu	Maxiane	Jonas	Jonas	Jonas	Samira	Alberto; Jonas	Alberto	Alberto	Ana Paula	Ana Paula	Samira	Juliano	Juliano	Jordana	Leandro	(none)	(none)
Power of Immunity	(none)			Jonas	Jonas	Sarah	Alberto	Gabriela	Chaiany	Alberto	Milena	Breno	Leandro	Solange	(none)	Jordana	(none)	Milena	(none)		(none)	(none)
Saved	(none)			Sarah	Jonas	Sol	Edílson	Chaiany	Gabriela	Jonas	Ana Paula	Samira	Solange	Solange	(none)	Jordana	(none)	Milena	(none)		(none)	(none)
Nomination (Twists)	(none)			Aline; Ana Paula	Leandro	Jonas	Samira; Sarah	Alberto; Breno; Solange	Chaiany; Maxiane	Alberto; Breno	Babu; Chaiany	Ana Paula; ~~Jonas~~; Leandro	Gabriela; Jordana; ~~Leandro~~	(none)	Marciele	(none)	Samira	Leandro	Juliano	Juliano	Ana Paula; Leandro; Milena	(none)
Nomination (HoH)	(none)			Milena	Matheus	Ana Paula	Babu	Marcelo	Milena	Jordana	Milena	Breno	Juliano	Alberto	Solange	Marciele	Jordana	Gabriela	Ana Paula	Jordana	(none)	(none)
Nomination (Housemates)	(none)			Paulo	Brigido	Brigido; Leandro	Sol	Jordana; Samira	Alberto	Marciele	Jordana	Solange	Jonas	Jordana; Leandro	Jordana	Chaiany; Juliano	Marciele	Marciele	Gabriela	Ana Paula	(none)	(none)
Veto Players	(none)			Aline; Ana Paula; Paulo	(none)	~~Brigido~~; Jonas; Leandro	Samira; Sarah; Sol	Alberto; Breno; Jordana; Samira; Solange	Alberto; ~~Chaiany~~; Maxiane	Alberto; Breno; Marciele	Babu; Chaiany; Jordana	Ana Paula; Leandro; Solange	Gabriela; Jonas; Jordana	(none)							(none)	(none)
Veto Winner(s)	(none)			Paulo	(none)	Jonas	Samira	Alberto; Breno; Jordana	Alberto	Marciele	Jordana	Solange	Jordana	(none)							(none)	(none)
Ana Paula	Not in House		Not eligible	Paulo	Not eligible	Brigido	Sol	Jordana	Alberto	Babu	Marciele	Solange	Jonas	Leandro	Head of Household	Chaiany	Marciele	Marciele	Gabriela	Milena	Nominated	Winner (Day 100)
Milena	Glass; House		Not eligible	Paulo	Brigido	Brigido	Sol	Jordana	Alberto	Babu	Jordana	Marciele	Jonas	Jordana	Jordana	Chaiany	Marciele	Marciele	Gabriela	Juliano	Nominated	Runner-up (Day 100)
Juliano	Not in House		Not eligible	Sol	Brigido	Brigido	Sol	Jordana	Alberto	Marciele	Marciele	Marciele	Jonas	Jordana	Jordana	Gabriela	Marciele	Marciele	Gabriela	Ana Paula	Exempt	Third place (Day 100)
Leandro	Glass; House		White; Room	Jonas	Brigido	Brigido	Sol	Jordana	Alberto	Marciele	Jordana	Gabriela	Jonas	Jordana	Gabriela	Gabriela	Samira	Marciele	Gabriela	Head of Household	Nominated	Evicted (Day 98)
Jordana	Glass; House		Not eligible	Edílson	Sol	Leandro	Solange	Samira	Juliano	Breno	Solange	Solange	Leandro	Juliano	Leandro	Juliano	Samira	Leandro	Head of Household	Ana Paula	Evicted (Day 95)	
Gabriela	Glass; House		White; Room	Paulo	Juliano	Leandro	Solange	Babu	Juliano	Breno	Juliano	Solange	Jonas	Leandro	Juliano	Juliano	Leandro	Leandro	Juliano	Evicted (Day 93)		
Marciele	Glass; House		Not eligible	Juliano	Gabriela	Leandro	Solange	Samira	Juliano	Breno	Solange	Solange	Leandro	Juliano	Leandro	Juliano	Samira	Leandro	Evicted (Day 91)			
Samira	Glass; House		Not eligible	Paulo	Gabriela	Leandro	Sol	Jordana	Alberto	Head of Household	Marciele	Solange	Jonas	Jordana	Juliano	Chaiany	Marciele	Evicted (Day 86)				
Chaiany	Glass; House		White; Room	Brigido	Brigido	Brigido	Sol	Jordana	Maxiane	Marciele	Jordana	Jordana	Jonas	Jordana	Jordana	Milena	Evicted (Day 84)					
Solange	Not in House		Not eligible	Paulo	Milena	Gabriela	Sol	Jordana	Alberto	Marciele	Jordana	Gabriela	Jonas	Milena	Gabriela	Evicted (Day 79)						
Alberto	Not in House		Not eligible	Head of Household	Chaiany	Leandro	Solange	Not eligible	Juliano	Breno	Co-Head of Household	Head of Household	Head of Household	Leandro	Evicted (Day 77)							
Jonas	Not in House		Not eligible	Paulo	Not eligible	Leandro	Head of Household	Head of Household	Head of Household	Breno	Co-Head of Household	Solange	Leandro	Evicted (Day 72)								
Breno	Glass; House		Not eligible	Paulo	Brigido	Brigido	Sol	Jordana	Alberto	Marciele	Jordana	Marciele	Evicted (Day 65)									
Babu	Not in House		Not eligible	Sol	Head of Household	Brigido	Sol	Jordana	Alberto	Marciele	Jordana	Evicted (Day 58)										
Maxiane	Glass; House		Not eligible	Paulo	Gabriela	Head of Household	Solange	Samira	Juliano	Evicted (Day 44)												
Marcelo	Glass; House		Not eligible	Paulo	Brigido	Brigido	Sol	Jordana	Evicted (Day 37)													
Edílson	Not in House		Not eligible	Sol	Sol	Leandro	Solange	Ejected (Day 34)														
Sol	Not in House		Not eligible	Juliano	Chaiany	Leandro	Solange	Ejected (Day 31)														
Sarah	Not in House		Not eligible	Paulo	Chaiany	Leandro	Solange	Evicted (Day 30)														
Brigido	Glass; House		Not eligible	Sol	Chaiany	Leandro	Evicted (Day 23)															
Paulo	Glass; House		Not eligible	Sol	Sol	Ejected (Day 19)																
Matheus	Glass; House		White; Room	Maxiane	Ana Paula	Evicted (Day 16)																
Aline	Not in House		Not eligible	Paulo	Evicted (Day 9)																	
Pedro	Glass; House		Not eligible	Walked (Day 7)																		
Henri	Not in House		Not eligible	Withdrew (Day 3)																		
Rafaella	Glass; House		White; Room	Withdrew (White Room - Day 7)																		
Ricardo	Glass; House		White; Room	Evicted (White Room - Day 6)																		
Livia	Glass; House		White; Room	Evicted (White Room - Day 5)																		
Elisa	Glass; House		White; Room	Evicted (White Room - Day 4)																		
Ricardinho	Glass; House		White; Room	Evicted (White Room - Day 2)																		
Marcel	Glass; House		Walked (Glass House)																			
Notes	1		2	3, 4, 5	6, 7	8, 9, 10	11, 12	13, 14, 15	16, 17						18						19	
Walked	Marcel		(none)	Pedro	(none)																	
Withdrew	(none)		Rafaella	Henri	(none)																	
Ejected	(none)					Paulo	(none)	Sol	(none)													
Ejected	(none)					Paulo	(none)	Edílson	(none)													
Nominated for Eviction	Livia; Marciele	Brigido; Ricardinho	Chaiany; Elisa; Gabriela; Leandro; Livia; Matheus; Rafaella; Ricardinho; Ricardo	Aline; Ana Paula; Milena	Brigido; Leandro; Matheus	Ana Paula; Brigido; Leandro	Babu; Sarah; Sol	Marcelo; Samira; Solange	Chaiany; Maxiane; Milena	Alberto; Breno; Jordana	Babu; Chaiany; Milena	Ana Paula; Breno; Leandro	Gabriela; Jonas; Juliano	Alberto; Jordana; Leandro	Jordana; Marciele; Solange	Chaiany; Juliano; Marciele	Jordana; Marciele; Samira	Gabriela; Leandro; Marciele	Ana Paula; Gabriela; Juliano	Ana Paula; Jordana; Juliano	Ana Paula; Leandro; Milena	Ana Paula; Juliano; Milena
Nominated for Eviction	Maxiane; Rafaella	Leandro; Marcelo	Chaiany; Elisa; Gabriela; Leandro; Livia; Matheus; Rafaella; Ricardinho; Ricardo	Aline; Ana Paula; Milena	Brigido; Leandro; Matheus	Ana Paula; Brigido; Leandro	Babu; Sarah; Sol	Marcelo; Samira; Solange	Chaiany; Maxiane; Milena	Alberto; Breno; Jordana	Babu; Chaiany; Milena	Ana Paula; Breno; Leandro	Gabriela; Jonas; Juliano	Alberto; Jordana; Leandro	Jordana; Marciele; Solange	Chaiany; Juliano; Marciele	Jordana; Marciele; Samira	Gabriela; Leandro; Marciele	Ana Paula; Gabriela; Juliano	Ana Paula; Jordana; Juliano	Ana Paula; Leandro; Milena	Ana Paula; Juliano; Milena
Nominated for Eviction	Chaiany; Jordana	Paulo; Ricardo	Chaiany; Elisa; Gabriela; Leandro; Livia; Matheus; Rafaella; Ricardinho; Ricardo	Aline; Ana Paula; Milena	Brigido; Leandro; Matheus	Ana Paula; Brigido; Leandro	Babu; Sarah; Sol	Marcelo; Samira; Solange	Chaiany; Maxiane; Milena	Alberto; Breno; Jordana	Babu; Chaiany; Milena	Ana Paula; Breno; Leandro	Gabriela; Jonas; Juliano	Alberto; Jordana; Leandro	Jordana; Marciele; Solange	Chaiany; Juliano; Marciele	Jordana; Marciele; Samira	Gabriela; Leandro; Marciele	Ana Paula; Gabriela; Juliano	Ana Paula; Jordana; Juliano	Ana Paula; Leandro; Milena	Ana Paula; Juliano; Milena
Nominated for Eviction	Gabriela; Milena	Breno; Marcel	Chaiany; Elisa; Gabriela; Leandro; Livia; Matheus; Rafaella; Ricardinho; Ricardo	Aline; Ana Paula; Milena	Brigido; Leandro; Matheus	Ana Paula; Brigido; Leandro	Babu; Sarah; Sol	Marcelo; Samira; Solange	Chaiany; Maxiane; Milena	Alberto; Breno; Jordana	Babu; Chaiany; Milena	Ana Paula; Breno; Leandro	Gabriela; Jonas; Juliano	Alberto; Jordana; Leandro	Jordana; Marciele; Solange	Chaiany; Juliano; Marciele	Jordana; Marciele; Samira	Gabriela; Leandro; Marciele	Ana Paula; Gabriela; Juliano	Ana Paula; Jordana; Juliano	Ana Paula; Leandro; Milena	Ana Paula; Juliano; Milena
Nominated for Eviction	Elisa; Samira	Matheus; Pedro	Chaiany; Elisa; Gabriela; Leandro; Livia; Matheus; Rafaella; Ricardinho; Ricardo	Aline; Ana Paula; Milena	Brigido; Leandro; Matheus	Ana Paula; Brigido; Leandro	Babu; Sarah; Sol	Marcelo; Samira; Solange	Chaiany; Maxiane; Milena	Alberto; Breno; Jordana	Babu; Chaiany; Milena	Ana Paula; Breno; Leandro	Gabriela; Jonas; Juliano	Alberto; Jordana; Leandro	Jordana; Marciele; Solange	Chaiany; Juliano; Marciele	Jordana; Marciele; Samira	Gabriela; Leandro; Marciele	Ana Paula; Gabriela; Juliano	Ana Paula; Jordana; Juliano	Ana Paula; Leandro; Milena	Ana Paula; Juliano; Milena
Evicted	Livia; 45.45% to enter	Ricardinho; 46.38% to enter	Ricardinho; Evicted by White Room	Aline; 61.64% to evict	Matheus; 79.48% to evict	Brigido; 77.88% to evict	Sarah; 69.13% to evict	Marcelo; 68.56% to evict	Maxiane; 63.21% to evict	Breno; 54.66% to move	Babu; 68.62% to evict	Breno; 58.96% to evict	Jonas; 53.48% to evict	Alberto; 67.95% to evict	Solange; 94.17% to evict	Chaiany; 61.07% to evict	Samira; 51.24% to evict	Marciele; 59.34% to evict	Gabriela; 64.12% to evict	Jordana; 71.80% to evict	Leandro; 52.19% to evict	Juliano; 6.77% to win
Evicted	Rafaella; 39.85% to enter	Leandro; 31.77% to enter	Ricardinho; Evicted by White Room	Aline; 61.64% to evict	Matheus; 79.48% to evict	Brigido; 77.88% to evict	Sarah; 69.13% to evict	Marcelo; 68.56% to evict	Maxiane; 63.21% to evict	Breno; 54.66% to move	Babu; 68.62% to evict	Breno; 58.96% to evict	Jonas; 53.48% to evict	Alberto; 67.95% to evict	Solange; 94.17% to evict	Chaiany; 61.07% to evict	Samira; 51.24% to evict	Marciele; 59.34% to evict	Gabriela; 64.12% to evict	Jordana; 71.80% to evict	Leandro; 52.19% to evict	Juliano; 6.77% to win
Evicted	Rafaella; 39.85% to enter	Leandro; 31.77% to enter	Elisa; Evicted by White Room	Aline; 61.64% to evict	Matheus; 79.48% to evict	Brigido; 77.88% to evict	Sarah; 69.13% to evict	Marcelo; 68.56% to evict	Maxiane; 63.21% to evict	Breno; 54.66% to move	Babu; 68.62% to evict	Breno; 58.96% to evict	Jonas; 53.48% to evict	Alberto; 67.95% to evict	Solange; 94.17% to evict	Chaiany; 61.07% to evict	Samira; 51.24% to evict	Marciele; 59.34% to evict	Gabriela; 64.12% to evict	Jordana; 71.80% to evict	Leandro; 52.19% to evict	Juliano; 6.77% to win
Evicted	Chaiany; 42.42% to enter	Ricardo; 46.25% to enter	Elisa; Evicted by White Room	Aline; 61.64% to evict	Matheus; 79.48% to evict	Brigido; 77.88% to evict	Sarah; 69.13% to evict	Marcelo; 68.56% to evict	Maxiane; 63.21% to evict	Breno; 54.66% to move	Babu; 68.62% to evict	Breno; 58.96% to evict	Jonas; 53.48% to evict	Alberto; 67.95% to evict	Solange; 94.17% to evict	Chaiany; 61.07% to evict	Samira; 51.24% to evict	Marciele; 59.34% to evict	Gabriela; 64.12% to evict	Jordana; 71.80% to evict	Leandro; 52.19% to evict	Juliano; 6.77% to win
Evicted	Chaiany; 42.42% to enter	Ricardo; 46.25% to enter	Livia; Bribed out White Room	Aline; 61.64% to evict	Matheus; 79.48% to evict	Brigido; 77.88% to evict	Sarah; 69.13% to evict	Marcelo; 68.56% to evict	Maxiane; 63.21% to evict	Breno; 54.66% to move	Babu; 68.62% to evict	Breno; 58.96% to evict	Jonas; 53.48% to evict	Alberto; 67.95% to evict	Solange; 94.17% to evict	Chaiany; 61.07% to evict	Samira; 51.24% to evict	Marciele; 59.34% to evict	Gabriela; 64.12% to evict	Jordana; 71.80% to evict	Leandro; 52.19% to evict	Milena; 17.29% to win
Evicted	Gabriela; 40.70% to enter	~~Breno~~; ~~49.48%~~; ~~to enter~~	Livia; Bribed out White Room	Aline; 61.64% to evict	Matheus; 79.48% to evict	Brigido; 77.88% to evict	Sarah; 69.13% to evict	Marcelo; 68.56% to evict	Maxiane; 63.21% to evict	Breno; 54.66% to move	Babu; 68.62% to evict	Breno; 58.96% to evict	Jonas; 53.48% to evict	Alberto; 67.95% to evict	Solange; 94.17% to evict	Chaiany; 61.07% to evict	Samira; 51.24% to evict	Marciele; 59.34% to evict	Gabriela; 64.12% to evict	Jordana; 71.80% to evict	Leandro; 52.19% to evict	Milena; 17.29% to win
Evicted	Elisa; 41.23% to enter			Aline; 61.64% to evict	Matheus; 79.48% to evict	Brigido; 77.88% to evict	Sarah; 69.13% to evict	Marcelo; 68.56% to evict	Maxiane; 63.21% to evict	Breno; 54.66% to move	Babu; 68.62% to evict	Breno; 58.96% to evict	Jonas; 53.48% to evict	Alberto; 67.95% to evict	Solange; 94.17% to evict	Chaiany; 61.07% to evict	Samira; 51.24% to evict	Marciele; 59.34% to evict	Gabriela; 64.12% to evict	Jordana; 71.80% to evict	Leandro; 52.19% to evict	Milena; 17.29% to win
Evicted	Elisa; 41.23% to enter	Matheus; 34.68% to enter	Ricardo; Evicted by White Room	Aline; 61.64% to evict	Matheus; 79.48% to evict	Brigido; 77.88% to evict	Sarah; 69.13% to evict	Marcelo; 68.56% to evict	Maxiane; 63.21% to evict	Breno; 54.66% to move	Babu; 68.62% to evict	Breno; 58.96% to evict	Jonas; 53.48% to evict	Alberto; 67.95% to evict	Solange; 94.17% to evict	Chaiany; 61.07% to evict	Samira; 51.24% to evict	Marciele; 59.34% to evict	Gabriela; 64.12% to evict	Jordana; 71.80% to evict	Leandro; 52.19% to evict	Milena; 17.29% to win
Survived	Marciele; 54.55% to enter	Brigido; 53.62% to enter	Chaiany; Won the White Room	Milena; 32.50% to evict	Leandro; 15.55% to evict	Leandro; 12.04% to evict	Babu; 28.49% to evict	Samira; 16.25% to evict	Milena; 36.11% to evict	Alberto; 43.12% to move	Milena; 30.91% to evict	Ana Paula; 25.17% to evict	Juliano; 43.49% to evict	Leandro; 28.74% to evict	Jordana; 3.54% to evict	Marciele; 20.37% to evict	Jordana; 47.67% to evict	Leandro; 37.62% to evict	Juliano; 29.24% to evict	Juliano; 26.14% to evict	Milena; 43.30% to evict	Ana Paula; 75.94% to win
Survived	Maxiane; 60.15% to enter	Marcelo; 68.23% to enter	Chaiany; Won the White Room	Milena; 32.50% to evict	Leandro; 15.55% to evict	Leandro; 12.04% to evict	Babu; 28.49% to evict	Samira; 16.25% to evict	Milena; 36.11% to evict	Alberto; 43.12% to move	Milena; 30.91% to evict	Ana Paula; 25.17% to evict	Juliano; 43.49% to evict	Leandro; 28.74% to evict	Jordana; 3.54% to evict	Marciele; 20.37% to evict	Jordana; 47.67% to evict	Leandro; 37.62% to evict	Juliano; 29.24% to evict	Juliano; 26.14% to evict	Milena; 43.30% to evict	Ana Paula; 75.94% to win
Survived	Maxiane; 60.15% to enter	Marcelo; 68.23% to enter	Gabriela; Won the White Room	Milena; 32.50% to evict	Leandro; 15.55% to evict	Leandro; 12.04% to evict	Babu; 28.49% to evict	Samira; 16.25% to evict	Milena; 36.11% to evict	Alberto; 43.12% to move	Milena; 30.91% to evict	Ana Paula; 25.17% to evict	Juliano; 43.49% to evict	Leandro; 28.74% to evict	Jordana; 3.54% to evict	Marciele; 20.37% to evict	Jordana; 47.67% to evict	Leandro; 37.62% to evict	Juliano; 29.24% to evict	Juliano; 26.14% to evict	Milena; 43.30% to evict	Ana Paula; 75.94% to win
Survived	Jordana; 57.58% to enter	Paulo; 53.75% to enter	Gabriela; Won the White Room	Milena; 32.50% to evict	Leandro; 15.55% to evict	Leandro; 12.04% to evict	Babu; 28.49% to evict	Samira; 16.25% to evict	Milena; 36.11% to evict	Alberto; 43.12% to move	Milena; 30.91% to evict	Ana Paula; 25.17% to evict	Juliano; 43.49% to evict	Leandro; 28.74% to evict	Jordana; 3.54% to evict	Marciele; 20.37% to evict	Jordana; 47.67% to evict	Leandro; 37.62% to evict	Juliano; 29.24% to evict	Juliano; 26.14% to evict	Milena; 43.30% to evict	Ana Paula; 75.94% to win
Survived	Jordana; 57.58% to enter	Paulo; 53.75% to enter	Leandro; Won the White Room	Ana Paula; 5.86% to evict	Brigido; 4.97% to evict	Ana Paula; 10.08% to evict	Sol; 2.38% to evict	Solange; 15.19% to evict	Chaiany; 0.68% to evict	Jordana; 2.22% to move	Chaiany; 0.47% to evict	Leandro; 15.87% to evict	Gabriela; 3.03% to evict	Jordana; 3.31% to evict	Marciele; 2.29% to evict	Juliano; 18.56% to evict	Marciele; 1.09% to evict	Gabriela; 3.04% to evict	Ana Paula; 6.64% to evict	Ana Paula; 2.06% to evict	Ana Paula; 4.51% to evict	Ana Paula; 75.94% to win
Survived	Milena; 59.30% to enter	~~Marcel~~; ~~50.52%~~; ~~to enter~~	Leandro; Won the White Room	Ana Paula; 5.86% to evict	Brigido; 4.97% to evict	Ana Paula; 10.08% to evict	Sol; 2.38% to evict	Solange; 15.19% to evict	Chaiany; 0.68% to evict	Jordana; 2.22% to move	Chaiany; 0.47% to evict	Leandro; 15.87% to evict	Gabriela; 3.03% to evict	Jordana; 3.31% to evict	Marciele; 2.29% to evict	Juliano; 18.56% to evict	Marciele; 1.09% to evict	Gabriela; 3.04% to evict	Ana Paula; 6.64% to evict	Ana Paula; 2.06% to evict	Ana Paula; 4.51% to evict	Ana Paula; 75.94% to win
Survived	Milena; 59.30% to enter	~~Marcel~~; ~~50.52%~~; ~~to enter~~	Matheus; Won the White Room	Ana Paula; 5.86% to evict	Brigido; 4.97% to evict	Ana Paula; 10.08% to evict	Sol; 2.38% to evict	Solange; 15.19% to evict	Chaiany; 0.68% to evict	Jordana; 2.22% to move	Chaiany; 0.47% to evict	Leandro; 15.87% to evict	Gabriela; 3.03% to evict	Jordana; 3.31% to evict	Marciele; 2.29% to evict	Juliano; 18.56% to evict	Marciele; 1.09% to evict	Gabriela; 3.04% to evict	Ana Paula; 6.64% to evict	Ana Paula; 2.06% to evict	Ana Paula; 4.51% to evict	Ana Paula; 75.94% to win
Survived	Samira; 58.77% to enter	Pedro; 65.32% to enter	Matheus; Won the White Room	Ana Paula; 5.86% to evict	Brigido; 4.97% to evict	Ana Paula; 10.08% to evict	Sol; 2.38% to evict	Solange; 15.19% to evict	Chaiany; 0.68% to evict	Jordana; 2.22% to move	Chaiany; 0.47% to evict	Leandro; 15.87% to evict	Gabriela; 3.03% to evict	Jordana; 3.31% to evict	Marciele; 2.29% to evict	Juliano; 18.56% to evict	Marciele; 1.09% to evict	Gabriela; 3.04% to evict	Ana Paula; 6.64% to evict	Ana Paula; 2.06% to evict	Ana Paula; 4.51% to evict	Ana Paula; 75.94% to win

=== Notes ===
- ^Note 1: Three days before the season premiere, 2 male and 2 female Civilians competed in Glass Houses at malls in each of the 5 regions of Brazil (North, Northeast, Center-West, Southeast and South) for a spot in the cast, with results being announced on Sunday; Despite being voted in by the public, Marcel chose to walk from the game and Breno was given his spot.
- ^Note 2: On Day 1, the nine Glass House housemates not voted in entered the White Room. While it was intended for the two longest-lasting Housemates to enter the Main House, this number was eventually increased to four due to the unexpected length of the twist and to replace two non-gameplay-related departures from the Main House. Chaiany, Gabriela, Leandro, and Matheus were the last four housemates and entered the game on Day 7. Upon entering the House, they received immunity for the first nomination.
- ^Note 3: On Day 3, Henri was withdrawn from the game for medical reasons after suffering a seizure during the endurance HoH competition, and once again after having been medically cleared and returning to the house.
- ^Note 4: On Day 4, Marcelo answered the Big Phone, being awarded immunity and being instructed to nominate one housemate for eviction; He chose Aline, who was then immediately instructed to nominate one housemate herself. She chose Ana Paula.
- ^Note 5: On Day 7, Pedro pressed the Withdrawal Button and left the House shortly before nominations, after inappropriate behavior with fellow housemate Jordana. Host Tadeu Schmidt later confirmed he would have been ejected regardless of his decision.
- ^Note 6: On Day 11, a button was placed in the backyard, and the first housemate to press it would start a chain of consequences in the form of surprise boxes. Sarah pressed the button and received the power to block one housemate's vote in the next eviction. The last two boxes were opened by Alberto and Brigido, who were told to agree on a housemate to nominate, or risk going on the block themselves; they chose to nominate Leandro.
- ^Note 7: Due to the surprise boxes twist, Sarah received the power to prevent one housemate from voting (Ana Paula), while Jonas lost his own vote. Ana Paula had also received the power to cast an additional vote, which was voided by Sarah's own power.
- ^Note 8: Breno answered the Big Phone on Day 17 and was instructed to choose one housemate to veto from all three competitions of the week (Head of Household, Power of Immunity and Veto, if eligible). He chose Brigido.
- ^Note 9: Paulo was ejected from the game after his conduct during the sprint to answer the Big Phone call was deemed to have endangered Jonas’s physical safety.
- ^Note 10: Babu, Marcelo, and Juliano answered three separate Big Phone calls throughout Days 18 and 19; on Day 19, they were instructed to unanimously agree on a housemate to nominate. They chose Jonas.
- ^Note 11: On Day 26, each housemate was required to name a person they would like to face on the block. On Day 27, HoH Jonas drew a name of a housemate (Sol) to face the person they chose (Juliano) in a Prisoner's dilemma scenario; if both chose the 'Immunity' card, both would go on the block, while choosing different cards would cause one to be immune and the other to be nominated. If both chose the 'Nominate' card, they would be required to unanimously agree on a person to nominate. Sol and Juliano both chose 'Nominate', and agreed on nominating Samira.
- ^Note 12: This week, the HoH's nominee had the power to name an additional nominee. During the nominations, Jonas, as HoH, nominated Babu, who in turn nominated Sarah.
- ^Note 13: Sol was ejected from the game after inappropriate physical behavior towards Ana Paula.
- ^Note 14: Edílson was ejected from the game after inappropriate physical behavior towards Leandro.
- ^Note 15: A Carnaval-themed twist unleashed several consequences for this week's eviction: Babu and Juliano were required to give immunity to one housemate (Milena), and Leandro was required to block the vote of one housemate (Alberto). Alberto, Breno, and Solange were required to reach a consensus and nominate one housemate for eviction. As they were unable to do so, all 3 of them were nominated instead.
- ^Note 16: On Day 43, each houseguest was asked the 3 people they would like to see on the block. On Day 44, Chaiany answered the Big Phone and was required to choose one of her 3 targets (Jordana, Marciele, and Maxiane) to compete against on the Risky Duel twist. They competed in a Monty Hall game, in which Chaiany was nominated, and Jordana received immunity.
- ^Note 17: This week, the Risky Duel nominee had the power to name an additional nominee. Chaiany was nominated by the twist, and in turn nominated Maxiane.
- ^Note 18: On Day 77, Milena answered the Big Phone and was required to nominate one housemate for eviction. She chose Marciele.
- ^Note 19: On Day 96, Juliano won the final competition, winning immunity for the final eviction and granting his place in the Finale. Therefore, Ana Paula, Leandro, and Milena were automatically nominated for eviction by default.

=== Have and Have-Nots ===
	Week 1			Week 2	Week 3	Week 4	Week 5	Week 6	Week 7	Week 8	Week 9	Week 10	Week 11		Week 12		Week 13		Week 14	
	Day 1	Day 4	Day 7	Week 2	Week 3	Week 4	Week 5	Week 6	Week 7	Week 8	Week 9	Week 10	Day 74	Day 77	Day 80	Day 84	Day 88	Day 91	Day 93	Day 96
Ana Paula	Have	Have-Not	Have-Not	Have-Not	Have-Not	Have-Not	~~Have-Not~~	Have-Not	~~Have~~	Have-Not	Have-Not	Have-Not	~~Have~~	Have	Have	Have	Have	Have-Not	Have-Not	Have
Milena	Have	Have-Not	Have-Not	Have	Have-Not	Have-Not	Have-Not	Have-Not	Have	Have-Not	Have-Not	Have-Not	~~Have~~	Have	Have	Have	Have	Have-Not	Have-Not	Have
Juliano	Have	Have	Have	Have	Have-Not	Have-Not	Have-Not	Have-Not	Have	Have-Not	Have-Not	Have-Not	Have	Have-Not	Have-Not	Have	Have	Have-Not	Have	Have
Leandro			Have	Have-Not	Have-Not	Have-Not	Have-Not	Have-Not	Have-Not	Have-Not	Have-Not	Have-Not	Have-Not	Have-Not	Have-Not	Have-Not	Have-Not	Have	Have	Have
Jordana	Have	Have-Not	Have-Not	Have-Not	Have	Have-Not	Have	Have	Have-Not	Have	Have	Have	Have-Not	Have-Not	Have-Not	Have-Not	Have-Not	Have	Have	
Gabriela			Have	Have-Not	Have-Not	Have	Have	Have	Have-Not	Have-Not	Have	Have-Not	Have-Not	Have-Not	Have-Not	Have-Not	Have-Not	Have		
Marciele	Have	Have	Have	Have-Not	Have	Have-Not	Have	Have-Not	Have-Not	Have	Have	Have	Have-Not	Have-Not	Have-Not	Have-Not	Have-Not			
Samira	Have	Have-Not	Have-Not	Have-Not	Have	Have-Not	Have-Not	Have-Not	Have	Have-Not	Have-Not	Have-Not	Have	Have	Have	Have-Not				
Chaiany			Have	Have-Not	Have-Not	Have-Not	Have-Not	Have-Not	Have-Not	Have-Not	Have-Not	Have-Not	Have-Not	Have-Not	Have-Not					
Solange	Have	Have-Not	Have-Not	Have	Have	Have-Not	Have-Not	Have-Not	Have-Not	Have	Have-Not	Have-Not	Have-Not	Have-Not						
Alberto	Have	Have	Have	Have	Have-Not	Have	Have	Have	Have-Not	Have	Have	~~Have~~	Have-Not							
Jonas	Have	Have	Have	Have-Not	Have-Not	Have	Have	Have	Have-Not	Have	~~Have~~	~~Have~~								
Breno	Have	Have-Not	Have-Not	Have	Have	Have-Not	Have-Not	Have-Not	Have	Have-Not	Have-Not									
Babu	Have	Have	Have	Have	Have-Not	Have-Not	Have-Not	Have-Not	Have-Not	Have-Not										
Maxiane	Have	Have-Not	Have-Not	Have-Not	Have	Have	Have-Not	Have												
Marcelo	Have	Have-Not	Have-Not	Have	Have	Have-Not	Have-Not													
Edílson	Have	Have	Have	Have	Have-Not	Have	~~Have~~													
Sol	Have	Have-Not	Have-Not	Have-Not	Have-Not	Have														
Sarah	Have	Have	Have	Have-Not	Have	Have														
Brigido	Have	Have-Not	Have-Not	Have-Not	Have-Not															
Paulo	Have	Have-Not	Have-Not	Have-Not	Have-Not															
Matheus			Have	Have-Not																
Aline	Have	Have-Not	Have-Not																	
Pedro	Have	Have	Have																	
Henri	Have																			

== Controversies ==
=== Glass Houses ===
On the morning of January 11, 2026, candidate Marcel Lucena, from the Southeast Region's Glass House, reportedly stated that he wanted to quit the show after expressing homesickness, which generated protests from the audience present at ParkShopping. Shortly after, Lucena ended up abandoning the idea, being called out by Tadeu Schmidt live during his appearance in Esporte Espetacular.

On the same day, with the announcement of the voting results, Marcel and Milena Moreira ended up being the most voted to enter from the region by the public, generating indignation among viewers due to the fact that the contestants had been disappointed with the announcement.

Meanwhile, participant Jordana Morais, from the Central-West Region's Glass House, divided opinions after research revealed that she had used the quota system in a public competition for the Court of Auditors of Distrito Federal in 2015, but ended up failing the exam. Furthermore, she had worked as a Technical Assistant in the Deputy Office of the political party União Brasil until April 2025, when she was dismissed.

Candidate Ricardinho Chahini, from the Glass House in the North Region, ended up causing an awkward situation on air by demanding that Esporte Espetacular cover tournaments and show reports about freestyle football, a sport in which he is an athlete and which is also little known in the country.

Furthermore, another factor that caused discomfort among the audience was that only one Black participant (Milena) was chosen by the public, while other Black candidates such as Breno Corã, Leandro Rocha, Matheus Moreira, and Ricardo Negro were left out of the show, going to the "White Room" challenge, raising debates about a possible racist view of the viewers, recalling cases of Black participants being rejected in other editions, and Milena began to suffer attacks on social media. Later, Corã replaced Marcel after he decided to quit the show on the day of the premiere, due to a panic attack on his way to the Globo Studios.

=== Medical negligence ===
On the morning of January 14, 2026, during the first Head of Household's Challenge, actor Henri Castelli suffered a seizure. He was assisted by dummies, who were activated by the participants, a team of firefighters, and businessman Alberto Cowboy, who knew that he could be eliminated if he left the challenge platform. Castelli was removed from the house and taken to a hospital near Globo Studios, returning shortly afterward. However, in the afternoon of the same day, Henri became ill again, this time in the outdoor area of the house while talking to actress Aline Campos. He was assisted by the production team and taken to the Diary Room, but did not return to the program, leaving the other housemates worried. This moment, unlike the first, was not broadcast on Globoplay, with the camera immediately switching to the Head of Household's Challenge. During filming, before the cut, Henri appeared quite restless, fidgeting with his hair and touching his face. At the start of the prime-time live broadcast on TV, Tadeu Schmidt informed viewers and participants that Castelli had to be removed from the reality show due to health issues. Globo was heavily criticized by the public and some doctors for the delay in attending to the participant and for bringing him back to the show without him undergoing examinations and medical observation lasting a minimum of 12 hours and a maximum of 24 hours. Later, it was revealed that the actor suffered from paresthesia due to a physical assault he had suffered in 2020.

On February 7th, before the final round of the Power of Immunity competition, Alberto Cowboy choked while drinking water, becoming ill in front of the other housemates who panicked throughout the house, leading some to call for production and even the dummies who were in the challenge area. Alberto was immediately assisted after being taken to the Diary Room, returning later and defeating Ana Paula Renault in the final round to win the competition. The businessman revealed that he suffers from sensitive glottis, where the larynx is highly sensitive to stimuli, also revealing that his family suffers from the same problem. Furthermore, this would not be the first time Cowboy had fallen ill on the show, having had the same incident in the seventh season. Once again, TV Globo was heavily criticized by the public due to the delay in providing immediate assistance.

On April 8th, Leandro Rocha felt unwell after waking up and ended up going to the Diary Room, receiving medical attention there and temporarily leaving the house to undergo tests, worrying some participants, who were soon informed that he had been treated and was fine, with Leandro returning to the reality show in the afternoon. This also wouldn't be the first time the housemate has felt unwell on the show, as the previous day, Leandro had complained of chest pains.

=== Accusation of psychological torture ===
While perpetuating the "White Room" dynamic among contestants Chaiany Andrade, Elisa Klein, Gabriela Saporito, Leandro Rocha, Livia Christina, Matheus Moreira, Rafaella Farias, and Ricardo Negro, the show's production attempted to use methods to force one of the seven remaining contestants to press the red button. These methods included disturbing sounds such as a baby crying, a chainsaw, a weather disaster siren, a dog barking, and the clinking of plates with forks and knives, as well as total darkness. However, they were largely unsuccessful, although Elisa gave up on the fourth day of the dynamic due to headaches caused by the noises, resulting from a migraine. The methods were classified as psychological torture, generating outrage among some viewers who started a hashtag on X demanding that all those confined in the room participate in the program. The case was also reported by a news program on the Spanish channel laSexta, which compared the room to a US military prison in Cuba. Furthermore, the contestants survived only on water and crackers and were not allowed to shower, as there was no shower on site, and there were also suspicions of sleep deprivation.

On January 16, 2026, on the fifth day of the challenge, Tadeu Schmidt announced that he would prepare a "surprise" to "shake up" the contestants in the fight for the three spots in the house. The surprise would be the presentation of proposals, since, after the departure of Ricardinho Chahini and Elisa, no participant had pressed the button. The first proposal was a "prize" of 50,000 reais, in addition to advertising for the Cif cleaning products brand, and ten years of their products free of charge. Livia ended up accepting the deal and, with that, pressed the red button. The idea was compared to the dynamics of the American Netflix series Squid Game. The situation again displeased the public, as the practice was seen as "cruel".

In the early morning of January 17, 2026, Ricardo had to give up on the challenge after suffering an allergic reaction and feeling hungry. Following this, the White Room contestants received a visit from the show's medical team, who confirmed their clinical well-being. As a solution for the decisive stage, the production increased the number of cast members to four, creating a final challenge: the contestants had to stand on small platforms. Whoever failed this challenge would win the prize of 50,000 reais, and the other four would go straight into the Big Brother house. In the early morning of January 18, 2026, the challenge was interrupted after Rafaella fainted, and the four remaining contestants (Chaiany, Gabriela, Leandro and Matheus) were declared the new housemates.

The Special Commission on Political Deaths and Disappearances, a state body linked to the Ministry of Human Rights and Citizenship, released a public letter repudiating the White Room challenge, comparing it to the torture carried out during the military dictatorship against political prisoners. Globo chose not to comment.

=== Pedro Espíndola's behavior ===
Some of Pedro Espíndola's actions began to be questioned by the other housemates after multiple occurrences of inappropriate behavior. On January 16th, Espíndola was involved in an episode of religious intolerance against Ana Paula Renault, implying to her that he had choked due to something she had done to him using her faith. Renault, who was vocal outside the house about her liberal and progressive views, had also been repeatedly questioned by Espíndola about her political affiliation, which she refused to disclose, knowing that Espíndola was hoping to mobilize extremist right-wing politicians to vote against her when she did end up on the block. Furthermore, he repeatedly stated throughout the house that he had cheated on his wife, as external reports of alleged domestic violence and involvement with minors surfaced as well.

On January 17th, during the Power of Immunity competition, Pedro intentionally pushed the button before his partner, Paulo Augusto, finished the challenge, disqualifying the pair and angering Augusto; he later repeatedly tried to hug and anger Augusto, and faked an anxiety attack to the other housemates. Espíndola also intentionally spilled propolis oil on Juliano Floss's jacket, which smelled of his girlfriend Marina Sena's perfume, greatly irritating Floss. On the same day, Espíndola took Jordana's underwear to hang it up without her permission, which bothered and made her extremely uncomfortable.

On the following day, Espíndola sexually harassed Jordana Morais in the house's pantry while she was looking for a curling iron. On that occasion, Pedro grabbed the housemate's neck in an attempt to forcibly kiss her. The images of the moment were not aired on pay-per-view, which outraged viewers. Furthermore, when Jordana recounted what she had suffered, the cameras were cut. After the incident, Pedro pressed the withdrawal button and left the game, knowing he would be ejected during the live show that night. In the Diary Room, immediately after quitting, Pedro admitted that he had his eye on Jordana because she resembled his wife. On the night of the same day, the live show aired the images from the pantry, showing the moment when Pedro approached Jordana and sexually harassed her, in addition to following her after the incident to ensure she would not speak up about it to other housemates, as he incorrectly assumed there were no cameras in the pantry.

After that, in a conversation with the housemates before the nominations, Tadeu Schmidt informed them that even if Pedro hadn't pressed the button to quit, he would have been removed from the show because of the incident. Globo began treating the now ex-BBB as an ejected housemate, excluding him from the season's intro, the list of housemates on the official website, and the show's features, in addition to terminating his contract with ViU, the broadcaster's digital agency, and cutting his participation stipend. The channel also prepared a dossier detailing the contestant's behavior for the authorities.

On March 19th, two months after leaving the program, Pedro and his family filed a lawsuit against TV Globo and considered including presenter Ana Maria Braga, from Mais Você, in the action. In the case of the channel, Espíndola accused Globo of breaching the contract signed before the confinement, which ended up being publicly leaked, in addition to alleging that the broadcaster did not provide him with assistance when he presented psychological problems after leaving the program and that it had been informed of the then-participant's situation, demanding 4.2 million reais for moral damages, while Braga was accused of making comments that would tarnish the participant's honor and incite hatred, especially when she said on the day after his withdrawal that she felt "relieved" not to receive him on the traditional breakfast with the evicted housemates, held on Wednesdays following the regular evictions.

=== Matheus Moreira's behavior ===
Matheus Moreira has accumulated a series of controversies since officially joining the cast of the reality show after surviving the White Room challenge. Among the most criticized episodes is the use of terms considered disrespectful, such as referring to Ana Paula Renault as Milena's "boss" in a context of racial and hierarchical conflict, as well as moments pointed out as homophobic, especially during a parade that preceded the first Head of Household's Party of the season. On that occasion, Matheus allegedly imitated effeminate mannerisms in a pejorative way, which led part of the public and some housemates to classify the attitude as "recreational homophobia". On January 23, 2026, Matheus was formally denounced to the Public Prosecutor's Office of the State of São Paulo on suspicion of homophobia. The complaint was filed by the alternate federal deputy and president of the LGBTQIAPN+ Pride Association, Agripino Magalhães, based mainly on the imitation considered offensive.

On January 26th, hours after Moreira was nominated for elimination by the week's Head of Household, Babu Santana, the housemate's team posted a video on his Instagram account of a hooded man wearing a sock over his face, with his voice altered, sitting in a chair in a neutral setting, with a tense soundtrack, criticizing the show's production for supposedly hiding some conflicts in the live broadcast and claiming that Matheus had come to break the "pattern" of the housemates. Part of the public interpreted the message as a supposed election campaign by the participant, using the show as a "stepping stone" to promote himself among right-wing politicians and influencers who adopt a stance against TV Globo, in addition to an attempt to sabotage his conflicts.

Days after his eviction, in a long statement on social media on February 4th, through an eleven-minute video, Moreira acknowledged his mistakes during the dialogues with the housemates, but again attacked Ana Paula Renault, accusing his former opponent of trying to use the Black movement to her advantage, in addition to comparing her to Princess Isabel, one of the heirs to the throne of the Empire of Brazil and responsible for signing the Golden Law. On the 9th, Ana Paula's team announced the opening of a lawsuit against Matheus after he reposted on his X a montage made by artificial intelligence of the now ex-BBB tied to a tree trunk, while Renault appeared with a whip in her hand, using the captions "right" and "left". The photo had a high racist content for using the theme of slavery.

Solange Couto's comment

On February 25, 2026, Solange Couto, Babu Santana, and Samira Nasser had a heated argument in the afternoon. It all started when Samira invited Solange to lunch, but the actress refused, claiming she wasn't feeling well. Later, in a conversation with Babu, Couto harshly criticized Nasser and, in a controversial comment, uttered the following phrase: "I was born of pleasure, not rape!"

The statements generated a strong negative reaction from the public, claiming it was one of the worst moments of the program. Due to this, the actress's team issued an official statement, signed by her legal department, denying any intention to insinuate that Samira was born as a result of a crime. According to the statement, there was a distortion in the interpretation of the phrase, and comments on the artist's social media were limited immediately afterward.

Lack of impartiality

The season was accused of lacking impartiality in live broadcasts on open TV for condensing a large portion of the dialogues between the housemates, especially in discussions. Fans of Ana Paula Renault accused Globo of trying to make the challenges easier for the group in the "Dream of Flying" room, which allegedly led to Jonas Sulzbach and Alberto Cowboy frequently winning the Head of Household and Power of Immunity challenges. Furthermore, Tadeu Schmidt allegedly excessively praised the duo in program dynamics and displayed different behavior towards other contestants, even calling Ana Paula's attention during the Big Sincere segment on March 23rd for complaining about the colored powder sprays and arguing outside the allotted time, drawing criticism from the public. Additionally, on March 24th, he became emotional when announcing Jonas's elimination in a brief speech and then praising him on social media.

After Jonas' elimination, several former participants of the show and other reality shows, as well as an administrator of Cowboy's social media profiles, issued protest notes against Globo, accusing the network of playing a "rigged game" to try to declare Ana Paula the winner, and highlighting that winning challenges on the show didn't make much sense since the public "wouldn't care" about it because what mattered was being with the "favorites".

Milena Lages' behavior

Some moments involving Milena Lages sparked questions from the public about a possible link between her behavior and Autism Spectrum Disorder. The contestant showed resistance to hugging Juliano Floss during the "Monster Punishment" on February 7, 2026, in addition to becoming agitated in seemingly unprovoked situations and demonstrating difficulty understanding certain more complex words. Despite the speculation, Milena's team denied that she has been diagnosed with autism.

Milena was also accused of homophobia in some dialogues within the house, being corrected by Ana Paula at certain times. In one instance, pointing out that bisexuality was a sin. At other times, Lages was involved in some scenes considered embarrassing by the public, especially in her clashes with Jonas Sulzbach, one of her biggest rivals in the house, and with other housemates, even being warned by production for going too far.
