= 2021 Multishow Brazilian Music Awards =

28th edition of the Multishow Brazilian Music Awards held in 2021

- Date: 8 December 2021
- Location: Jeunesse Arena; Rio de Janeiro, Rio de Janeiro, Brazil
- Hosted by: Iza; Tatá Werneck

Highlights
- Most awards: Marina Sena (3)
- Most nominations: Anitta (5)
- Website: gshow.globo.com/multishow/premio-multishow

Television/radio coverage
- Network: Multishow

The 2021 Multishow Brazilian Music Awards (Portuguese: Prêmio Multishow de Música Brasileira 2021) (or simply 2021 Multishow Awards) (Portuguese: Prêmio Multishow 2021) was held on 8 December 2021, at the Jeunesse Arena in Rio de Janeiro, Brazil. Singer Iza and television presenter Tatá Werneck hosted the show.

The nominations were reveled on 18 October 2021. Anitta led the nominations with five. Marina Sena received the most awards with three.

== Performances ==
=== Pre-show ===
List of performers at the premiere ceremony
| Artist(s) | Song(s) |
|---|---|
| Xuxa Majur | "Arco-Íris" "Lua de Cristal" |
| Israel & Rodolffo | "Batom de Cereja" |
| Tierry | "Cabeça Branca" |
| Majur | "Última dança" "Flua" "Divino Maravilhoso" |

=== Main ceremony ===
List of performers at the 2021 Multishow Brazilian Music Awards
| Artist(s) | Song(s) |
|---|---|
| Marina Sena | "Por Supuesto" |
| Ivete Sangalo Carlinhos Brown | "Mexe a Cabeça" |
| Barões da Pisadinha | "Recairei" "Zero Saudade" |
| Jojo Maronttinni Gabily Bianca MC Carol | Funk Medley "Devo Tá na Moda" "Bilhete Premiado" "Tudo no Sigilo" "Levanta Mina" |
| Ferrugem Marvvila Menos é Mais Xande de Pilares | Samba Medley "Abre Alas" "Ainda É Tempo Pra Ser Feliz" "Conselho" "Tá Escrito" "A Amizade" |
| Iza | "Gueto" "Sem Filtro" |
| Chico Chico Nando Reis Lan Lan | Tribute to Cássia Eller "Mãe" "All Star" "O Segundo Sol" |
| Juliette | "Vixe Que Gostoso" |
| Duda Beat | "Bixinho" "Meu Pisêro" "Nem Um Pouquinho" "Tu e Eu" |
| Iza Luísa Sonza Ivete Sangalo | Tribute to Marília Mendonça "Como Faz Com Ela" "De Quem É a Culpa?" "Eu Sei de Cor" "Todo Mundo Vai Sofrer" |
| Iza Mariah Nala | Tribute to Paulo Gustavo "Gostava Tanto de Você" |
| Luísa Sonza | "Interesseira" "VIP" "Mulher do Ano" "Modo Turbo" "Anaconda" |
| Emicida | "Pequena Memória Para Um Tempo Sem Memória" "Paisagem" |
| Dennis DJ | "Deixa de Onda (Coisa Nenhuma)" "Isso Que É Vida" "Lágrima Por Lágrima" "Sou Teu Fã" "Tô Tranquilão" "Vamos Beber" "No Baile Nóis É Mídia" "Malandramente" "Quando o Dj Mandar" "Só Você" "Tchu Tchuca" "Um Tapinha Não Dói" "De Segunda A Sexta" "Te Prometo" "Agora É Tudo Meu" |

== Winners and nominees ==
The nominees for Duo of the Year were announced on 16 October 2021, on the Altas Horas. The next day, the nominees for Hit of the Year and Performance of the Year were revealed. The complete list of nominees was announced on 18 October 2021. Anitta led the nominations with five, followed by Luísa Sonza and Marina Sena with four each, while Israel & Rodolffo, João Gomes, and Luan Santana received three nominations each. On 7 November 2021, it was announced that the category Female Singer of the Year had its voting canceled. Due to Marília Mendonça death, the other nominees decided, together, to give up competing in the category and give the award to her as a way to honor her posthumously. Marina Sena was the most awarded artist of the night, winning three awards. Winners appear first and highlighted in bold.

=== Voted categories ===
The winners of the following categories were chosen by fan votes.

| Female Singer of the Year | Male Singer of the Year |
|---|---|
| **Marília Mendonça**; ~~Ivete Sangalo~~; ~~Anitta~~; ~~Iza~~; ~~Luísa Sonza~~ | **Luan Santana**; Dilsinho; Emicida; Ferrugem; Gusttavo Lima |
| Group of the Year | Duo of the Year |
| **Lagum**; Gilsons; Menos é Mais; Os Barões da Pisadinha; Sorriso Maroto | **Israel & Rodolffo**; Anavitória; Henrique & Juliano; Jorge & Mateus; Zé Neto & Cristiano |
| Hit of the Year | Song of the Year |
| **"Batom de Cereja" – Israel & Rodolffo**; "Baby Me Atende" – Matheus Fernandes and Dilsinho; "Deixa de Onda" – Dennis DJ, Ludmilla and Xamã; "Meu Pedaço de Pecado" – João Gomes; "Tipo Gin" – Kevin o Chris | **"Girl from Rio" – Anitta**; "Batom de Cereja" – Israel & Rodolffo; "Morena" – Luan Santana; "Calma" – Marisa Monte; "Gueto" – Iza |
| Performance of the Year | Try It |
| **Ivete Sangalo**; Anitta; Gusttavo Lima; Luísa Sonza; Pabllo Vittar | **Marina Sena**; João Gomes; L7nnon; Matheus Fernandes; Zé Vaqueiro |
TVZ Music Video of the Year
**"Girl from Rio" – Anitta (Director: Giovanni Bianco)**; "Atenção" – Pedro Sampaio and Luísa Sonza (Director: Fernando Moraes); "Morena" – Luan Santana (Director: Bruno Ilogti and Will Etchebehere); "Modo Turbo" – Luísa Sonza, Pabllo Vittar and Anitta (Director: Gustavo Moraes and Marco Lafer); "Rainha de Favela" – Ludmilla (Director: Felipe Sassi)

=== Professional categories ===
The winners of the following categories were chosen by Multishow Award Academy.

| New Artist of the Year | Song of the Year |
|---|---|
| **Marina Sena**; Jadsa; João Gomes | **"Crash" – Juçara Marçal**; "Me Toca" – Marina Sena; "Sonho da Lay" – Tuyo (featuring Luccas Carlos) |
| Record of the Year | Album Cover of the Year |
| **Batidão Tropical – Pabllo Vittar** | **De Primeira – Marina Sena** |
| Album of the Year | Music Video of the Year |
| **Delta Estácio Blues – Juçara Marçal**; De Primeira – Marina Sena; Olho de Vidro – Jadsa | **"Nem um Pouquinho" – Duda Beat and Trevo** |
Producer of the Year
**Kiko Dinucci**
