= Coisas Naturais =

2025 studio album by Marina Sena

Studio album by Marina Sena
- Released: March 31, 2025
- Recorded: 2024–2025
- Genre: MPB
- Length: 43:13
- Language: Portuguese
- Label: Sony
- Producers: Janluska; Gabriel Duarte; Marina Sena

Marina Sena chronology
Vício Inerente (2023)	Coisas Naturais (2025)	Marinada Vol. 01 (2025)

Singles from Coisas Naturais
- 1. "Numa Ilha" Released: December 4, 2024; 2. "Ouro de Tolo" Released: March 31, 2025; 3. "Lua Cheia" Released: September 10, 2025

Coisas Naturais is the third studio album by Brazilian singer-songwriter Marina Sena, released on March 31, 2025, through Sony Music Brazil. The repertoire consists of 13 tracks written by Sena herself, from which the singles "Numa Ilha", "Ouro de Tolo" and "Lua Cheia" were extracted.

Coisas Naturais was met with generally positive reviews from music critics. The album was nominated for the Latin Grammy Award for Best Portuguese Language Contemporary Pop Album, while the song "Ouro de Tolo" received a nomination for Best Portuguese Language Song, marking the second time the artist has been nominated in both categories. To support the album, Marina embarked on the Coisas Naturais Ao Vivo tour, between April 2025 and November 2026.

== Background and release ==
On November 29, 2024, Marina announced the release of the first single from her third studio album, titled "Numa Ilha". The song was made available on digital platforms on December 4, 2024.

On March 26, 2025, Marina Sena revealed the cover art for her studio album Coisas Naturais through social media. The album arrived on digital platforms on March 31, 2025, with 13 tracks. The album presents itself as a visual and sonic invitation to a universe where simplicity and authenticity meet. Its aesthetic is marked by organic elements and a color palette that evokes nature, creating an intimate and at the same time vibrant atmosphere.

== Track listing ==
Coisas Naturais track listing
No.	Title	Writer(s)	Producer(s)	Length
1.	"Coisas Naturais"	André Oliveira; Janluska; Marina Sena; Matheus Guimarães	Janluska	3:59
2.	"Numa Ilha"	Marina Sena	Gabriel Duarte; Janluska	4:09
3.	"Desmistificar"	Janluska; Sena	Janluska; Sena	3:33
4.	"Anjo"	Sena	Janluska	3:47
5.	"Tokitô" (with Gaia and Nenny)	Epico; Gaia; Kidonov; Sena; Nenny	Epico; Janluska; Kidonov	3:06
6.	"Sem Lei"	Oliveira; Janluska; Sena; Guimarães	Janluska	2:53
7.	"Sensei"	Adieu; Enzo Di Carlo; Janluska; Sena	Adieu; Di Carlo; Janluska; Sena	2:43
8.	"Lua Cheia"	Janluska; Sena	Duarte; Janluska	3:17
9.	"Combo de Sorte"	Oliveira; Janluska; Sena; Guimarães	Duarte; Janluska	3:39
10.	"Mágico"	Sena	Janluska	3:16
11.	"Doçura" (with Çantarmata)	Oliveira; Angela; Benito Muñoz; Charlie; Duarte; Jose Barbosa; Luis Ángel; Sena; Omar Roldán; Tino Gomes	Duarte; Janluska; Çantarmata	2:34
12.	"Carnaval"	Adieu; Di Carlo; Janluska; Sena	Adieu; Di Carlo; Janluska	1:13
13.	"Ouro de Tolo"	Sena	André Oliva; Janluska	4:56
Total length:				43:13

== Critical reception ==
Professional ratings
Review scores
Source	Rating
Música Instantânea	8.3/10
G1	2.5/5 stars
DiscoAvaliadoBR	7.8/10
Pop Fantasma	8/10
Escutai	9.5/10
O Grito!	5/5 stars

Coisas Naturais was met with generally positive reviews from music critics. Cleber Facchi from Música Instantânea highlighted that the album functions as a work that balances and combines Marina Sena's entire musical background with a "remarkable resourcefulness." Conversely, Mauro Ferreira from G1 gave the album a mixed review, defining it as a reflection of a "fragmentation of ideas and references" in which the artist ended up dissolving her own identity; he noted that although the repertoire flirts with samba and Latin rhythms, the final result sounds diluted and "not truly spontaneous." Ricardo Schott of Pop Fantasma considered the album the first in which the artist presents herself "as a whole," praising Sena's vocal transition and the successful fusion of genres ranging from tecnobrega to tropicalist rock.

Gabriel Silva of DiscoAvaliadoBR praised the individual tracks for their tropical approach and references to Gal Costa, but pointed out that the linear listening of the album fails due to a lack of stability, sonic cohesion, and scattered genres. Edu from Escutai described the project as a work that "echoes a transcendental and soulful Marina Sena," praising the singer's artistic confidence and stating that the album serves as a perfect soundtrack to bring light to personal reflections. Antônio Lira of Revista O Grito! awarded the album a perfect score, praising it for distancing itself from market trends and reaffirming the singer's originality; he observed that the project combines the sonic variety of De Primeira (2021) with the elaborate production of Vício Inerente (2023) to build a work that dialogues with both the past and contemporaneity.

== Awards and nominations ==
Awards and nominations for Coisas Naturais
Year	Award ceremony	Category	Result	Ref.
2025	Latin Grammy Awards	Best Portuguese Language Contemporary Pop Album	Nominated	
2025	Prêmio Multishow	Album of the Year	Nominated	
2025	Prêmio Multishow	Cover of the Year	Nominated	
2025	WME Awards	Album	Nominated	

== Commercial performance ==
=== Weekly charts ===
Weekly chart performance for Coisas Naturais
Chart (2025)	Peak position
Portuguese Albums (AFP)	30

=== Certifications ===
Certifications for Coisas Naturais
Region	Certification	Certified units/sales
Brazil (Pro-Música Brasil)	2× Platinum	160,000^{‡}
^{‡} Sales+streaming figures based on certification alone.
