= Juliano Floss =

Brazilian dancer and digital influencer (born 2004)

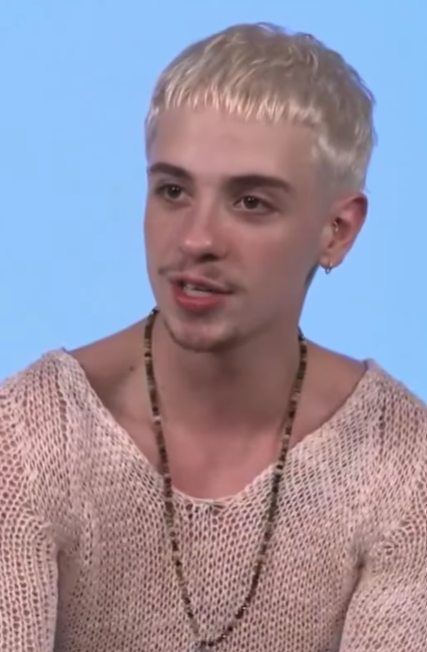
- Floss in 2026
- Born: Juliano Floss Lucatel; 11 June 2004 (age 22); Pinhalzinho, Santa Catarina, Brazil
- Occupations: Dancer; digital influencer; actor
- Years active: 2015–present

Instagram information
- Page: JULIANO FLOSS LUCATEL
- Followers: 7 million

TikTok information
- Page: julianofloss
- Followers: 13.8 million

YouTube information
- Channel: FLOSS
- Subscribers: 831K
- Views: 113 million
- Last updated: October 7, 2026

Juliano Floss Lucatel (born 11 June 2004) is a Brazilian dancer, digital influencer, and actor. Born in Pinhalzinho, Santa Catarina, he gained national recognition following his appearance on the dance competition show Dança dos Famosos and his third-place finish in the 26th season of the reality television series Big Brother Brasil. He has accumulated over 20 million followers across his social media platforms.

== Biography ==
Juliano was born on June 11, 2004, in Pinhalzinho, in the countryside of the state of Santa Catarina. He is the son of Mariana Floss and Rubens Floss.

His interest in dance began at age 11 when he participated in a school dance contest whose prize was a trip to a water park. Although he didn't win, the experience sparked his passion for dance. Later, encouraged by a school friend whose mother ran a gym, he started taking classes and began his career in the field. He then specialized as a hip-hop dancer, participating in competitions in Brazil and abroad.

During the isolation caused by the COVID-19 pandemic, he decided to record videos for the social network TikTok. His first published video surpassed 1 million views. Since then, he regularly posts dance videos, amassing over 20 million followers across his social media. His dance videos include collaborations with artists such as singers Anitta and Luísa Sonza.

== Career ==
Juliano has participated in dance competitions and performances, having performed on stage at Rock in Rio Lisboa with singer Anitta and at The Town Festival with rapper Veigh.

He has also appeared in the music videos for "Nu" (Anitta and Hitmaker), which has accumulated 47 million views on YouTube, and "Playground" (Vivi Wanderley), with 26 million views on YouTube.

=== Dança dos Famosos ===
In 2024, he was announced as one of the participants in the talent show Dança dos Famosos, a dance competition on the program Domingão com Huck. Juliano recounts that he was at the house of funk artist MC Daniel, another contestant in the same edition, when he accepted the invitation to participate.

Initially tipped as one of the favorites, he progressed through several elimination rounds, standing out in the first knockout phase. Nevertheless, he was eliminated when only six couples remained.

He was eliminated from the competition by a margin of one-tenth of a point, after accidentally hitting his dance partner, Dani Duran, in the face during a waltz performance. On that occasion, guest judge Nathalia Dill gave him a score of 9.9, lower than what he needed to stay. Juliano's fans criticized the actress on social media, sparking debates about the weight of the judges' scores. The following week, Luciano Huck, host of Domingão do Huck, spoke live about the controversy: "she is within her rights. I get very upset when this senseless internet court starts judging people because they have an opinion."

On January 10, 2024, Nizam Hayek, a contestant on Big Brother Brasil, in a conversation with influencer Vanessa Lopes, questioned Juliano's sexuality, stating that he had a "vocation" to be gay: "I always thought this Juliano Floss was gay, I always thought he was gay. He has more of a vocation for it, right? The way he dances is very gay, man!" The comment generated negative criticism and was treated as a case of homophobia.

=== Big Brother Brasil ===
In January 2026, he was announced as one of the participants in the 26th season of Big Brother Brasil. The season announced participants divided into three groups: "Pipoca" (unknown contestants), "Camarote" (celebrities), and "Veteranos" (former participants). Juliano joined the "Camarote" group.

Before his participation in Big Brother Brasil 26, Juliano Floss faced criticism on social media, being labeled as "toxic" by part of the public, following the repercussions of controversies involving the end of his relationship with Vivi Wanderley. As the reality show unfolded, his public image transformed, and Juliano began to garner more support from some viewers.

On February 24, 2026, Juliano Floss cut his finger while trying to open a package of rapadura with a knife, requiring two stitches.

== Personal life ==
Juliano Floss began a relationship with influencer and billionaire Vivi Wanderley. In December 2023, Vivi announced the end of their relationship on social media. After the breakup, Vivi and Juliano exchanged indirect messages on social media.

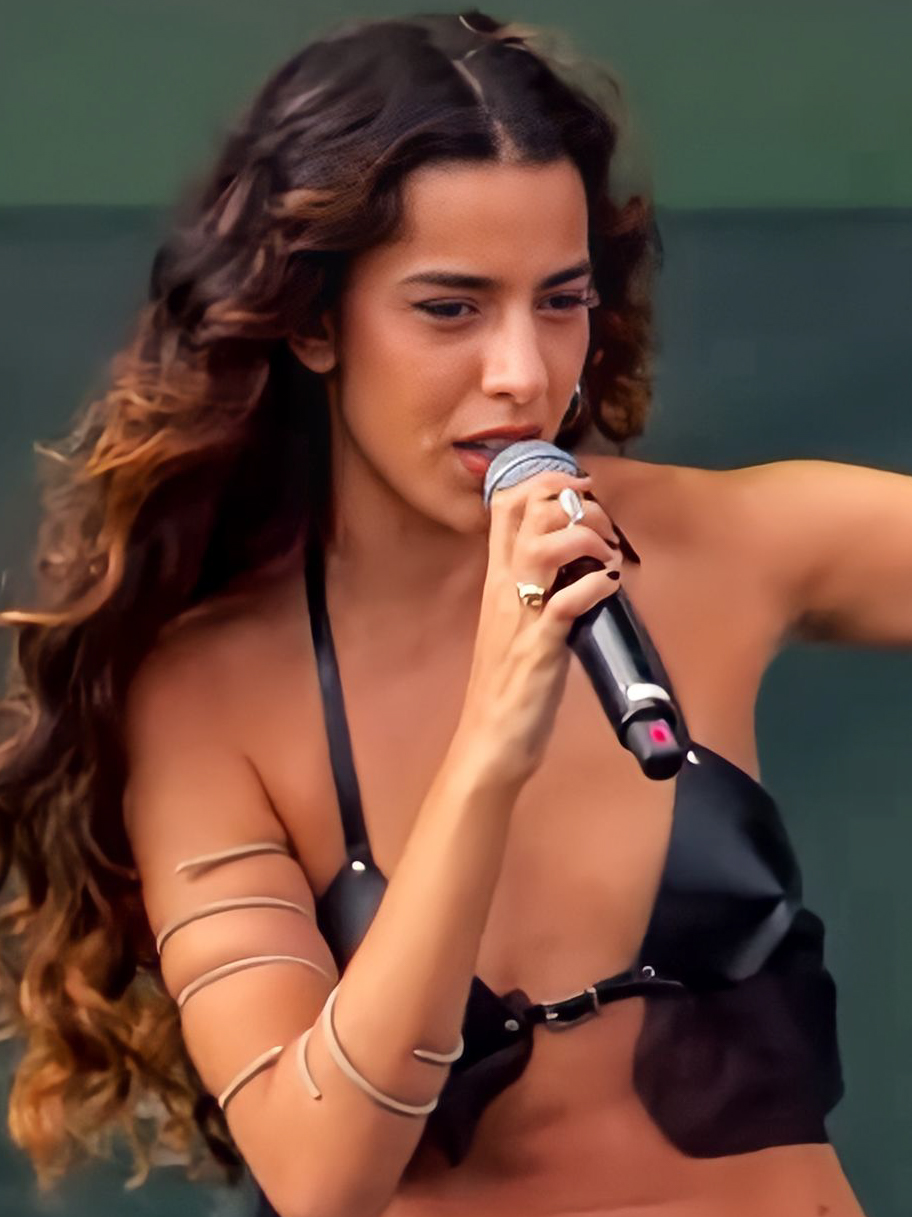
Marina Sena during a show at The Town Festival. Juliano confirmed his relationship with Marina in July 2024.

In early 2024, rumors began to circulate that Marina Sena and Juliano Floss were in a serious relationship. Juliano initially denied the information, after the two appeared together in a photo alongside Bruna Marquezine and João Guilherme. In July 2024, Juliano confirmed his relationship with singer Marina Sena. Juliano is 8 years younger than Marina, which generated debates online about their age difference. Juliano and Sena later broke up, although they reunited to endorse the Lula da Silva 2026 presidential campaign.

The song "Numa Ilha", which received a platinum certification from Pro-Música Brasil (PMB), was composed by Marina Sena in honor of Juliano:

"I knew she wrote this song for me, right? It was at the very beginning of our relationship. I was sleeping. She woke me up at 7 in the morning, with a guitar over me. She said: 'I wrote a song for you' and started playing it."

— Juliano Floss

== Awards and nominations ==
Name of the award ceremony, year presented, award category, nominee(s) of the award, and the result of the nomination
Award ceremony	Year	Category	Nominee(s)/work	Result	Ref.
BreakTudo Awards	2023	Internet Personality	Juliano Floss	Nominated	
SEC Awards	2024	Crush of the Year	Juliano Floss	Nominated	
Prêmio Jovem Brasileiro	2024	Best Tiktoker	Juliano Floss	Won	
