= Big Brother 26 =

Big Brother 26 is the twenty-sixth season of various versions of television show Big Brother and may refer to:

- Big Brother 26, the 2024 edition of the U.S. version
- Big Brother Brasil 26, the 2026 edition of the Brazilian version
