= Piscinão de Ramos =

Saltwater lagoon in Brazil

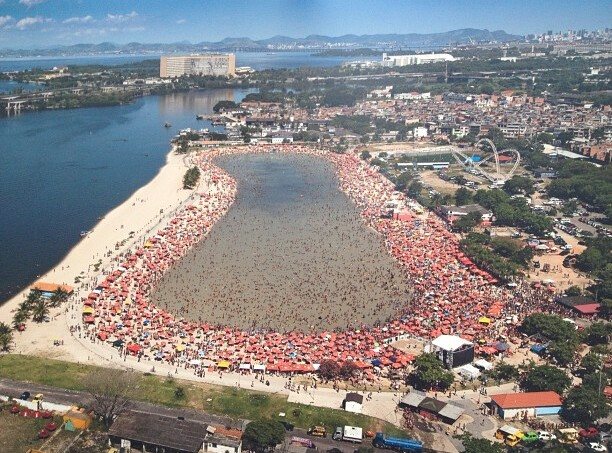
- Aerial view of the Piscinão de Ramos in 2012
- Location: Rio de Janeiro, Brazil
- Coordinates: 22°50′21″S 43°15′2″W
- Surface area: 26,414 m^{2} (284,320 sq ft)
- Average depth: 1.4 m (4 ft 7 in)

Location
- Interactive map of Piscinão de Ramos

Piscinão de Ramos ("Ramos [Beach] Big Pool") is an artificial saltwater lagoon located in the Maré neighborhood of Rio de Janeiro, Brazil. Constructed in 2001 with the goal of providing residents of Rio's North Zone with a clean bathing area, it is considered the main leisure area of the North Zone and has recorded up to 60,000 visitors on a single weekend. The swimming complex, along with the beach and leisure areas, are part of the Carlos Roberto de Oliveira Dicró Environmental Park at Ramos Beach (Portuguese: Parque Ambiental da Praia de Ramos Carlos Roberto de Oliveira Dicró).

== History ==
Located on the banks of Avenida Brasil, Ramos Beach is one of the most traditional gathering spots for families from Rio's suburbs—despite having been polluted since the 1950s and being considered unfit for swimming since the 1980s. During Anthony Garotinho's term as governor of the state of Rio de Janeiro, the state government launched a project to clean up Ramos Beach by building a stone dam capable of separating the channels connecting the area to Guanabara Bay, preventing further waste from reaching the site. However, since the bay's water surface is a listed heritage asset, the execution of the original idea was abandoned. The solution found at the time was then the creation of an artificial lagoon at the same location.

At the time of its inauguration, the Piscinão was located next to two favelas controlled by the Terceiro Comando, and a little further ahead was a favela controlled by the Comando Vermelho. Many visitors to the Piscinão said they were warned by members of the Terceiro Comando not to wear red clothing, as it would be an allusion to the Comando Vermelho. A resident of a favela dominated by the Comando Vermelho told the Folha de S.Paulo newspaper that she does not go to the Piscinão because she fears being killed. At first, the police said this was an invention of the media.

Over the years, the large swimming pool has faced criticism due to the accumulation of trash in its surroundings and the buildup of sludge and fecal matter in its waters, despite Rio-Águas claiming that the entire volume of water in the saltwater lake is replaced every seven to ten days. The replacement of the "liner," meanwhile, occurs "on average every two years."

In 2023, the park was revitalized by the Rio de Janeiro city government. The interventions included the construction of multi‑sports courts, a sand court, a synthetic grass field, new playgrounds for children, facilities for seniors, a multipurpose area, social gathering spaces, landscape restoration, as well as the renovation of the bleachers, bicycle path, skate park, and the remodeling of the restrooms.

== In popular culture ==
The samba singer Dicró was one of the greatest advocates for the creation of the Piscinão de Ramos, and the lagoon became a theme in many of his songs. After his death in 2012, the park was renamed in his honor.

Some telenovelas have brought attention to the Piscinão de Ramos, such as O Clone (TV Globo) and Amor e Intrigas (Record).

In 2021, singer Anitta filmed part of the music video for the song "Girl From Rio" at the Piscinão.
