= Fofocalizando =

- Created by: Silvio Santos
- Screenplay by: Ivana Perecin; Adriana Borges Bonfim; Elber Correa
- Directed by: Marcio Esquilo Lima
- Creative directors: Anderson Perri; Ronaldo Araujo
- Presented by: Gabriel Cartolano; Cariúcha; Thayse Teixeira; Matheus Baldi; Gaby Cabrini
- Country of origin: Brazil
- Original language: Portuguese

Production
- Producers: Renata Nascimento; Jean Carlos; Ana Beatriz Gonçalves; Bruna Soares; Barbara Santana Canhisares; Salatiel Silva dos Santos; Danielly Alves de Lima; Amanda Lopes Moreira; Graziela Tonin Gois
- Running time: 75 minutes

Original release
- Network: SBT
- Release: August 1, 2016 – present

Fofocalizando (stylized as FFZ and formerly called Fofocando) is a Brazilian variety television program primarily focused on celebrities, gossip, and entertainment. Originally produced and broadcast by SBT, the show features celebrity news, interviews, curiosities, and behind-the-scenes content from television, music, film, and the internet. It is presented by Gabriel Cartolano, Cariúcha, Thayse Teixeira, Matheus Baldi, and Gaby Cabrini.

== History ==
=== Fofocando: First phase and transition to Fofocalizando (2016–2020) ===
Fofocando premiered on August 1, 2016, at 2:15 PM. The debut episode featured actress Larissa Manoela, who shared details about the future of the twin characters she played in the telenovela Cúmplices de um Resgate. The show's panel included Leão Lobo and Mamma Bruschetta, alongside a mysterious figure with a paper bag over his head, later revealed to be Gabriel Cartolano, a former TV Fama producer from RedeTV!. On August 25, a morning rerun at 7 am briefly replaced part of the children's program Carrossel Animado, though this ended by September 12. The show expanded to 1:45 pm on September 26, 2016, with Mara Maravilha joining as host, while journalist Leo Dias began contributing live commentary from Rio de Janeiro. Frequent schedule changes followed: by November 2016, it shifted to 1:15 pm, then 8 am in January 2017, and finally settled at 2:45 pm later that month, rebranding as Fofocalizando. The revamped version phased out the "Homem do Saco" character, added new commentators like Décio Piccinini, and introduced reporter Everton "Fofoquito" Di Souza. Despite lineup adjustments — including Lívia Andrade's permanent role and Mara Maravilha’s 2018 departure — ratings declined. On May 7, 2020, Silvio Santos abruptly canceled the show due to poor performance against competitors like Hora da Venenosa (Record) and Sessão da Tarde (Globo). A short-lived replacement, Triturando, was scrapped within a month.

=== Second phase (2021-present) ===
Fofocalizando returned on February 8, 2021, after a Big Brother Brasil debate sparked renewed interest. Reverting to its original format, it featured Chris Flores, Flor Fernandez, and Gabriela Cabrini. Controversies arose in 2022, including Ana Paula Renault's dismissal over backstage conflicts and Matheus Baldi's exit following backlash for his coverage of Klara Castanho's adoption case. Leo Dias rejoined in March 2023, shifting Flor Fernandez to field reporting. Chris Flores departed in October 2023, leaving Dias, Cabrini, and Cartolano as main hosts. In 2024, reality star Cariúcha was added to the cast after positive audience feedback, while production cuts affected reporters Kallyna Sabino and Roberta Miguel. Since October 28, 2024, the show airs at 3:30 pm, swapping timeslots with the Mexican telenovela Mi camino es amarte.

On July 16, 2025, amid rumors of Leo Dias' departure from SBT, the program announced an artificial intelligence presenter, which divided viewers' opinions.

== Criticism and controversies ==
Upon its debut, Fofocando faced harsh criticism from both media critics and viewers. Ricardo Feltrin, a journalist from UOL, labeled the show as "soft" ('chapa-branca') due to its heavy focus on SBT-related content and outdated celebrity news, arguing these factors contributed to its low ratings. In a follow-up article, UOL echoed these critiques, with online commentators dismissing the "Homem do Saco" (Man with the Paper Bag) gimmick as unnecessary. Columnist Flávio Ricco, however, speculated the masked figure was Gabriel Cartolano, a former TV Fama producer hired by Silvio Santos, while noting internal SBT concerns about the show's lack of substance. Odair Braz Jr. of R7 bluntly called the program "boring" and criticized its reliance on stale gossip, quipping, "Watching Mamma Bruschetta and Leão Lobo read old news isn't a recipe for success."

The show clapped back the next day: Cartolano appeared on set — unmasked — to deny being the "Homem do Saco" and theatrically tuned a TV to rival Vídeo Show (Globo) as a jab at Feltrin. Ricco fired back, alleging the role had been recast with Domingo Legal's Nelsinho Tamberi, though Tamberi denied it. The drama escalated when Vídeo Show host Otaviano Costa tweeted a sarcastic War-themed boast about "conquering three networks" by appearing simultaneously on Globo, Fofocando, and a telenovela rerun. Leão Lobo dismissed it as coincidence on-air, while rival A Hora da Venenosa's Fabíola Reipert snapped that Costa should worry about Globo's ratings instead. Mara Maravilha's September 2016 hiring reignited backlash after she interrupted co-hosts, declared homosexuality "trendy," and feuded with Lívia Andrade — prompting Notícias da TV's Daniel Castro to blame her for the show's sinking ratings. By year's end, critic Mauricio Stycer ranked Fofocando among TV's "15 worst moments," calling it "a masterclass in Silvio Santos' chaotic management." The show's COVID-19 coverage drew fresh outrage in 2020, notably when Lívia spread fake news about "holy hand sanitizer," leading to her suspension.
