= Ana Paula Renault =

Brazilian journalist and television personality

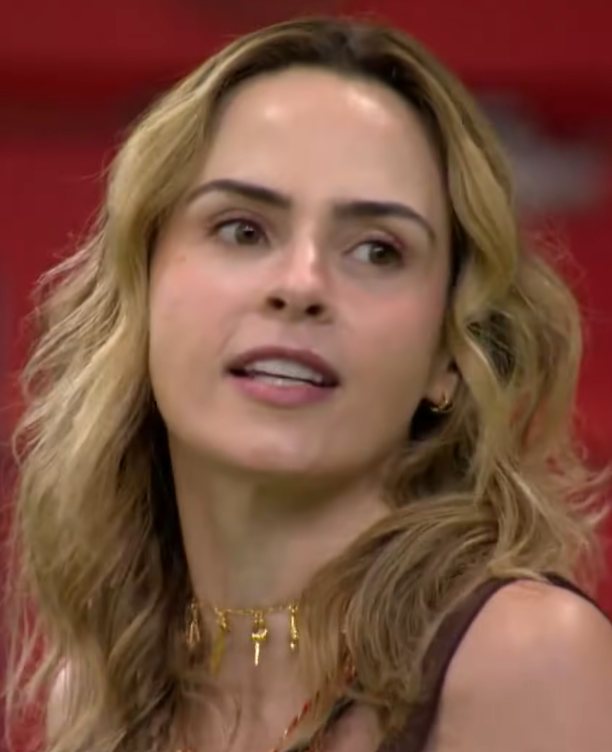
- Renault in 2026
- Born: Ana Paula Machado Renault; 22 November 1981 (age 44); Belo Horizonte, Minas Gerais, Brazil
- Education: Pontifical Catholic University of Minas Gerais
- Occupations: Journalist; columnist; television personality
- Years active: 2016–present
- Father: Gerardo Renault (father)
- Website: anapaularenault.com.br

Ana Paula Machado Renault (born 22 November 1981) is a Brazilian journalist, television personality, and activist. She gained national prominence after participating in the 16th season of the reality show Big Brother Brasil in 2016, subsequently expanding her career as a commentator, entertainment host, and digital influencer. In 2018, she competed on the 10th season of A Fazenda, and in 2026, won the 26th season of Big Brother Brasil with approximately 76% of the vote, becoming the first person to compete on A Fazenda prior to appearing on Big Brother Brasil.

== Career ==
=== Big Brother Brasil 16 ===
Ana Paula started her television career as a contestant on the sixteenth season of the hit reality show Big Brother Brasil. During her time in the house, she became a loved albeit polarizing figure due to her willingness to speak her mind and confront her opponents in the game, both to fellow housemates and viewers. She received further notoriety for her iconic catchphrase "Olha ela!" (which roughly translates to "look at her!"), used by her to taunt the house following a return from a fake eviction; the phrase quickly went viral in the country. In spite of her success in the game and being one of the favorites to win the prize, Ana Paula was ejected from the game after an incident during a party with fellow housemate Renan Oliveira, finishing in 8th place.

Host Pedro Bial declared Ana Paula to be one of the most iconic figures in the history of the show, so much that she was invited to the Finale of the season in spite of having been ejected, a first to the show.

=== Post Show ===
Shortly after her departure from the reality show, she made a few appearances as an interviewer on the hit show Video Show, on the same television channel. As her popularity continued to grow, Rede Globo invited her to make a guest appearance on the telenovela Haja Coração.

In 2017, as she had no ties with her past TV channel, she signed a contract with UOL to be a web columnist. Her job was to judge and comment on entertainment TV shows, such as the following seasons of Big Brother Brasil.

In September 2018, in order to attend to her fans demand, she joined the tenth season of the reality show A Fazenda, on the television channel Record, and was the third one to be evicted. After on A Fazenda, she kept working on UOL until 2019.

In early 2020, she decided to create a YouTube channel to talk about the twentieth season of Big Brother Brasil and to video document some days of her life. In May 2020, she was invited by the television channel SBT to be a regular judge of the entertainment hit show Triturando.

In 2021, she became one of the presenters of the program Fofocalizando, a format similar to Triturando.

== Filmography ==
Television
| Year | Title | Role |
|---|---|---|
| 2016 | Big Brother Brasil 16 | Housemate (Ejected – 8th place) |
| 2016 | Vídeo Show | Reporter |
| 2016 | Haja Coração | Herself |
| 2016 | Procurando Casseta & Planeta | Herself |
| 2017 | Os Suburbanos | Herself |
| 2017 | Fofocalizando | Reporter |
| 2018 | Dra. Darci | Maristela |
| 2018 | A Fazenda 10 | Contestant (12th place) |
| 2020- 2021 | Triturando | Commentator |
| 2021 | Fofocalizando | Presenter |
| 2025 | BBB: O Documentário | Herself |
| 2025 | Melhor da Tarde | Commentator |
| 2025 | Big Brother Brasil 25 | Guest |
| 2026 | Big Brother Brasil 26 | Housemate (Winner) |

Internet
| Year | Title | Role | Note |
|---|---|---|---|
| 2017–2019 | UOL Vê BBB | Reporter | |
| 2019 | CarnaUOL | Reporter | Youtube |
| 2018-2019 | Girls in the House | Shanna Tenner | Dubbing |
| 2020 | Ana Paula Renault | Presenter | Youtube |
| 2021 | Fofoca Retrô | Presenter | Reality Shows |
| 2022 | 4TalkCast! | Presenter | Podcast |
| 2023 | Splash Uol | Presenter | Youtube |
