= Gerardo Renault =

Brazilian politician (1929–2026)

Member of the Chamber of Deputies of Brazil for Minas Gerais
- In office 1 February 1978 – 31 January 1986

Member of the Legislative Assembly of Minas Gerais
- In office 1 February 1968 – 31 January 1978

Personal details
- Born: Gerardo Henrique Machado Renault; 17 September 1929 Belo Horizonte, Brazil
- Died: 19 April 2026 (aged 96) Belo Horizonte, Brazil
- Party: ARENA (1965–1980); PDS
- Education: Federal University of Minas Gerais
- Occupation: Lawyer

Gerardo Henrique Machado Renault (17 September 1929 – 19 April 2026) was a Brazilian lawyer and politician. A member of the National Renewal Alliance and the Democratic Social Party, he served in the Legislative Assembly of Minas Gerais from 1968 to 1978 and in the Chamber of Deputies from 1978 to 1986.

Renault was the father of the journalist and television personality Ana Paula Renault.

Renault died in Belo Horizonte on 19 April 2026, at the age of 96.
