= De Primeira =

Studio album by Marina Sena
- Released: August 19, 2021
- Recorded: 2020
- Genres: Pop; MPB
- Length: 34:25
- Language: Portuguese
- Labels: Alá Comunicação e Cultura; A Quadrilha
- Producer: Iuri Rio Branco

Marina Sena chronology
De Primeira (2020)	Vício Inerente (2023)

Singles from De Primeira
- 1. "Me Toca" Released: January 14, 2021; 2. "Voltei pra Mim" Released: July 10, 2021; 3. "Por Supuesto" Released: November 24, 2021

De Primeira (Portuguese: [dʒi pɾiˈmejɾɐ]) is the debut studio album by Brazilian singer Marina Sena, released on August 19, 2021. The album was produced by Iuri Rio Branco. It is mainly a pop album with MPB elements. De Primeira was nominated for the 23rd edition of the Latin Grammy Awards in the category Best Portuguese Language Contemporary Pop Album.

Three singles were released to promote the album: "Me Toca", "Voltei pra Mim" and "Por Supuesto", the best known. An extended play was also released, "Especial de Primeira", recording 1 year after its album, bringing a re-recording of 4 songs with new arrangements, they are: "Por Supuesto", "Temporal", "Pelejei " and "Voltei Pra Mim". The Especial de Primeira was released on August 25, 2022.

== Release and promotion ==
=== Singles ===
"Me Toca" was released as the album's first single on January 14, 2021. The track is the first single of her solo career and about it Marina stated: "It was the last song that we composed, after understanding the direction of the album. That's why it is more direct, and it goes exactly to the key point of the question, with complexity and simplicity going hand in hand". The track also stayed on Spotify's top 50 list for two months. The singer was even chosen as Radar Artist of the month of May by the platform. The song was nominated for 'Song of the Year' at the 2021 Multishow Brazilian Music Award and 'Alternative Music' at the WME Awards.

"Voltei Pra Mim" was released as the album's second single on June 10, 2021.

"Por Supuesto" was released as the third single on November 24, 2021. Before being released as a single, the song was already a commercial success after going viral on the video sharing application TikTok. The song even reached the 5th place on Spotify's "50 that went viral in the world".

== Track listing ==
All tracks are written by Marina de Oliveira Sena and Iuri Rio Branco.

De Primeira track listing
No.	Title	Length
1.	"Me Toca"	3:06
2.	"Pelejei"	3:16
3.	"Por Supuesto"	3:06
4.	"Cabelo"	4:11
5.	"Voltei pra Mim"	3:18
6.	"Temporal"	3:11
7.	"Tamborim"	3:20
8.	"Amiúde"	4:11
9.	"Seu Olhar"	3:11
10.	"Santo"	3:32
Total length:		34:25

== Certifications ==
Certifications for De Primeira
Region	Certification	Certified units/sales
Brazil (Pro-Música Brasil)	Gold	40,000^{‡}
^{‡} Sales+streaming figures based on certification alone.

== Release history ==
Release dates and formats for De Primeira
Region	Date	Format	Label	Ref.
Various	August 19, 2021	digital download; streaming	Alá Comunicação e Cultura & A Quadrilha	
Brazil	December 10, 2021	Vinyl	Noize Record Club	
