= Girl from Rio (song) =

Single by Anitta

from the album Versions of Me
- Language: English; Portuguese
- Released: April 29, 2021
- Genre: Electropop; trap-pop
- Length: 3:13
- Label: Warner
- Songwriters: Vinicius de Moraes; Norman Gimbel; Tom Jobim; Anitta; Mikkel Eriksen; Tor Hermansen; Rachel Keen; Carolina Colón Juarbe
- Producer: Stargate

Anitta singles chronology
"Mi Niña" (remix) (2021)	"Girl from Rio" (2021)	"Mon soleil" (2021)

Music video
- "Girl from Rio" on YouTube

"Girl from Rio" is a song by Brazilian singer Anitta from her fifth studio album Versions of Me. It was released as the second single from the album through Warner Records on April 29, 2021. A song about Anitta's own life, it interpolates "The Girl from Ipanema" by Vinicius de Moraes and Tom Jobim. A remix of the song featuring American rapper DaBaby was released on May 21, 2021, and was sent to US and European radio stations on May 25.

== Background and composition ==
On March 30, 2021, Anitta began teasing the release of the song on her Instagram by posting black and white photos of the city of Rio de Janeiro in the 1960s and 1970s, as well as trivial contents regarding recordings of the song "The Girl from Ipanema", a bossa nova classic composed by Vinícius de Moraes and Tom Jobim in the voices of Astrud Gilberto, Frank Sinatra, Amy Winehouse, and Ella Fitzgerald, and photos of anonymous Carioca women and famous figures, such as actresses Taís Araújo, Carolina Dieckmann and Fernanda Montenegro; by singer Fernanda Abreu; models Roberta Close and Helô Pinheiro (who inspired the music of Moraes and Jobim); of the twin athletes Bia and Branca Feres; and the late political and activist Marielle Franco.

"The main idea was from Stargate. I got to the studio and they told me, 'We have this idea of getting the 'Garota de Ipanema' song and turning it into a big smash for you.' And so when I heard the (riff)… it's not an actual sample – they played it – but of course it's completely a reference to the original song. So it was like, 'Oh my God, this is so Brazil.' And then we decided, while 'Garota de Ipanema' talks about a very fancy and chic (neighborhood) in) Rio, we would bring the other version of my country and my city, which is the hood, the streets, is the place I come from."

— Anitta talking about the song in an interview with Variety.

"Girl from Rio" is the second single from Anitta's fifth album Versions of Me, released via Warner Music on April 12, 2022. The song interpolates Vinicius de Moraes and Tom Jobim's bossa nova classic "The Girl from Ipanema" (in the original Portuguese, A Garota de Ipanema). According to Anitta, while working on an early draft of "Girl from Rio", producers Stargate suggested using a sample of "The Girl from Ipanema" on the song. She immediately agreed to the idea, however, she said it was not easy to acquire the rights to use the sample, thus she had to intervene herself. Anitta claims to have contacted Jobim and Moraes' respective families to explain her intentions with the use of the sample; she was eventually allowed to use the sample on "Girl from Rio" but had to fully give up on publishing rights on the song.

Despite singing in English on the song, Anitta considers "Girl from Rio" one of her most personal works as she aimed at bringing together as much of Brazilian culture and her own life experiences as possible. While at a studio recording the song, Anitta received a text message containing a link to a story on a Brazilian newspaper in which it had been published there were rumors that she had a half-brother. This led producers Stargate to suggest Anitta to include a verse on the song commenting about her newly discovered half-brother.

A remix featuring American rapper DaBaby was released on May 21, 2021.

== Music video ==
The music video for "Girl from Rio" was shot at Piscinão de Ramos, a leisure area in Rio de Janeiro, and also in a studio where the Ipanema beach was reproduced. The Giovanni Bianco-directed video was released simultaneously with the song,

The video intercalates from scenes of Anitta and her family having fun at Piscinão de Ramos to a studio footage of Anitta as a glamorous redhead with colorful and vintage visuals in a recreated 1960s Ipanema. Anitta's vintage visuals on the video were inspired on the 2020s television series Ratched and Sarah Paulson's character Nurse Ratched, as well as the general aesthetic of the 1960s. Carmen Miranda's performances were also mentioned as inspirations for the video's aesthetic.

=== Remix version ===
The music video for the remix version featuring DaBaby was released on May 28, 2021, and was directed by Giovanni Bianco.

== Commercial performance ==
Select year-end rankings
Publication	List	Rank	Ref.
Billboard	The 25 Best Latin Songs of 2021: Staff List	N/A	
Tidal	Best Latin Video of 2021	42	
Eolor	Best Brazilian Music Video of 2021	5	

== Live performances and Accolades ==
Anitta first performed the song on May 2, 2021, on Fantástico. The next day, she sang the song on Today. On May 5, she performed the song on Jimmy Kimmel Live!, and on May 9, she performed it at Ellas y Su Música. Anitta also performed the song at the 2021 MTV Video Music Awards as part of an advertisement for Burger King.

Awards and nominations for "Girl From Rio"
Year	Award ceremony	Category	Result	Ref.
2021	Break Tudo Awards	National Clip	Won	
2021	F5 Awards	Song of the Year	Nominated	
2021	Prêmio Jovem Brasileiro	Bombastic Clip	Nominated	
2021	Meus Prêmios Nick	Favorite National Hit	Won	
2021	MTV Millennial Awards Brazil	Video of the Year	Won	
2021	Multishow Brazilian Music Awards	Song of the Year	Won	
2021	Multishow Brazilian Music Awards	Best Music Video TVZ	Won	
2021	Music Video Festival Awards	Best Music Video	Won	
2021	Music Video Festival Awards	Best Art Direction in a Videoclip	Nominated	
2021	Music Video Festival Awards	Best Choreography in a Videoclip	Nominated	
2021	Music Video Festival Awards	Best Costume in a Videoclip	Won	
2021	POP Mais Awards	Best Music Video	Won	
2021	POP Mais Awards	Song of the Year	Won	
2021	Splash Awards	Best Music Video	Nominated	
2022	Latin American Music Awards	Favorite Video	Won	

== Charts ==
=== Weekly charts ===
Chart performance for "Girl from Rio"
Chart (2021)	Peak position
Brazil (Top 100 Airplay)	11
Chile (Monitor Latino)	13
Global 200 (Billboard)	164
Billboard Global 200 Excl. US (Billboard)	85
Portugal (AFP)	40
San Marino (SMRRTV Top 50)	37
US Mainstream Top 40 (Billboard)	29
US Rhythmic (Billboard)	34

=== DaBaby Remix ===
Chart performance for "Girl from Rio remix"
Chart (2021)	Peak position
Argentina Hot 100 (Billboard)	93
Canada CHR/Top 40 (Billboard)	35
Mexico Airplay (Billboard)	13
Mexico Ingles Airplay (Billboard)	12
US Pop Airplay (Billboard)	24
US Rhythmic Airplay (Billboard)	28

=== Monthly charts ===
Chart (2021)	Position
Brazil (Top 50 Streaming)	17

=== Year-end charts ===
Chart (2021)	Position
Brazil Airplay (Crowley)	65
Brazil Top Streaming Songs (Pro-Música Brasil)	169

== Certifications ==
Certifications for "Girl from Rio"
Region	Certification	Certified units/sales
Brazil (Pro-Música Brasil)	Diamond	160,000^{‡}
Portugal (AFP)	Gold	5,000^{‡}
^{‡} Sales+streaming figures based on certification alone.
