= Vício Inerente =

Studio album by Marina Sena
- Released: April 27, 2023
- Recorded: 2021–2023
- Genre: Pop, experimental, trap, pagotrap, rap, reggaeton, hip hop, funk, R&B, trip hop, drill, grime, soul, afrobeats and MPB
- Length: 43:05
- Language: Portuguese
- Label: Sony Music Brazil
- Producer: Iuri Rio Branco

Marina Sena chronology
De Primeira (2021)	Vício Inerente (2023)

Singles from Vício Inerente
- 1. "Tudo Pra Amar Você" Released: February 23, 2023; 2. "Olho no Gato" Released: April 30, 2023; 3. "Que Tal" Released: September 25, 2023; 4. "Dano Sarrada" Released: November 23, 2023

Vício Inerente (Portuguese: [ˈvisiu ineˈɾẽtʃi]; Inherent Vice) is the second studio album by Brazilian singer-songwriter Marina Sena, released on April 27, 2023, through Sony Music Brazil.

== Release and promotion ==
The album contains 12 tracks written by Marina Sena in collaboration with producer Iuri Rio Branco and has four singles, "Tudo Pra Amar Você" and "Olho no Gato", "Que Tal" and "Dano Sarrada".

The album has a pop sound, with influences from Brazilian Popular Music, experimental music, trap and R&B, in addition to rap and hip hop in the track "Que Tal", in partnership with the paulistan rapper Fleezus.

== Background ==
After the release of her first album in her solo career, entitled De Primeira, Marina Sena continued her work and released three singles, appearing at the top of Spotify's "Viral Global" chart, with the track "Por Supuesto".

Marina continued the work on her debut album and performed in all regions of Brazil on the De Primeira tour, performing in European countries such as Germany, Spain, Portugal and Ireland.

On February 17, 2023, Marina announced the new contract with Sony and the release of the first single from the second studio album, entitled "Tudo pra Amar Você". The song was made available on digital platforms on February 23 and the respective music video was released later on YouTube, on that date.

As part of the strategy to promote the first single and the new album, on March 16, 2023, Marina presented "Tudo pra Amar Você" live for the first time at the Encontro com Patrícia Poeta. On April 24, 2023, Marina Sena performed the song live on TVZ hosted by Pocah. On April 30, 2023, Sena performed the tracks "Tudo Pra Amar Você" and "Olho no Gato" on TV Globo's Fantástico program.

Vício Inerente hit the platforms on April 27, 2023.

After the release of the album and following the interview shown on the program Fantástico, Sena released "Olho no Gato" as the second single, on April 30, 2023. Before being released as a single, the track reached position 100 of the Top 100 Spotify Brazil.

After the track's success on social media, Marina Sena had to change her entire singles release logistics and release "Que Tal" as the album's third single on September 25, 2023, 1 day before her birthday.

On November 23, 2023, Marina Sena released as the fourth single the most viral song and the first track from the album "Dano Sarrada" along with the music video on YouTube.

== Cover art ==
The album's cover and visuals were directed by Miguel Figueira de Mello, Jean LaBanca and Fernando Tomaz. They presented the singer in a futuristic atmosphere, with reference to the city of São Paulo, known as the "jungle of stones". According to Sena, the visuals seek to represent "a girl who left the countryside and went to live in the capital", in reference to the singer's move from Minas Gerais to the capital of São Paulo as a result of her professional advancement. In contrast to the urban visuals, the arts also feature elements linked to the sea, such as the shell, which according to Marina refer to "a longing for wanting to hear nature, the sea".

== Track listing ==
All tracks are written by Marina Sena, in addition to Fleezus on track 7. All tracks are produced by Iuri Rio Branco.

Vício Inerente track listing
No.	Title	Length
1.	"Dano Sarrada"	3:24
2.	"Olho no Gato"	3:39
3.	"Tudo Pra Amar Você"	2:55
4.	"Tudo Seu"	3:32
5.	"Mande um Sinal"	4:39
6.	"Me Ganhar"	3:54
7.	"Que Tal" (with Fleezus)	3:10
8.	"Meu Paraíso Sou Eu"	1:57
9.	"Partiu Capoeira"	3:53
10.	"Mais de Mil"	3:54
11.	"Sonho Bom"	3:50
12.	"Pra Ficar Comigo"	4:12
Total length:		43:05

== Release history ==
Release dates and formats for Vício Inerente
Region	Date	Format	Label	Ref.
Various	April 27, 2023	digital download; streaming	Sony Music Brazil	
Brazil	June 10, 2023	Vinyl	Noize Record Club	
