= Marina Sena =

Brazilian singer-songwriter (born 1996)

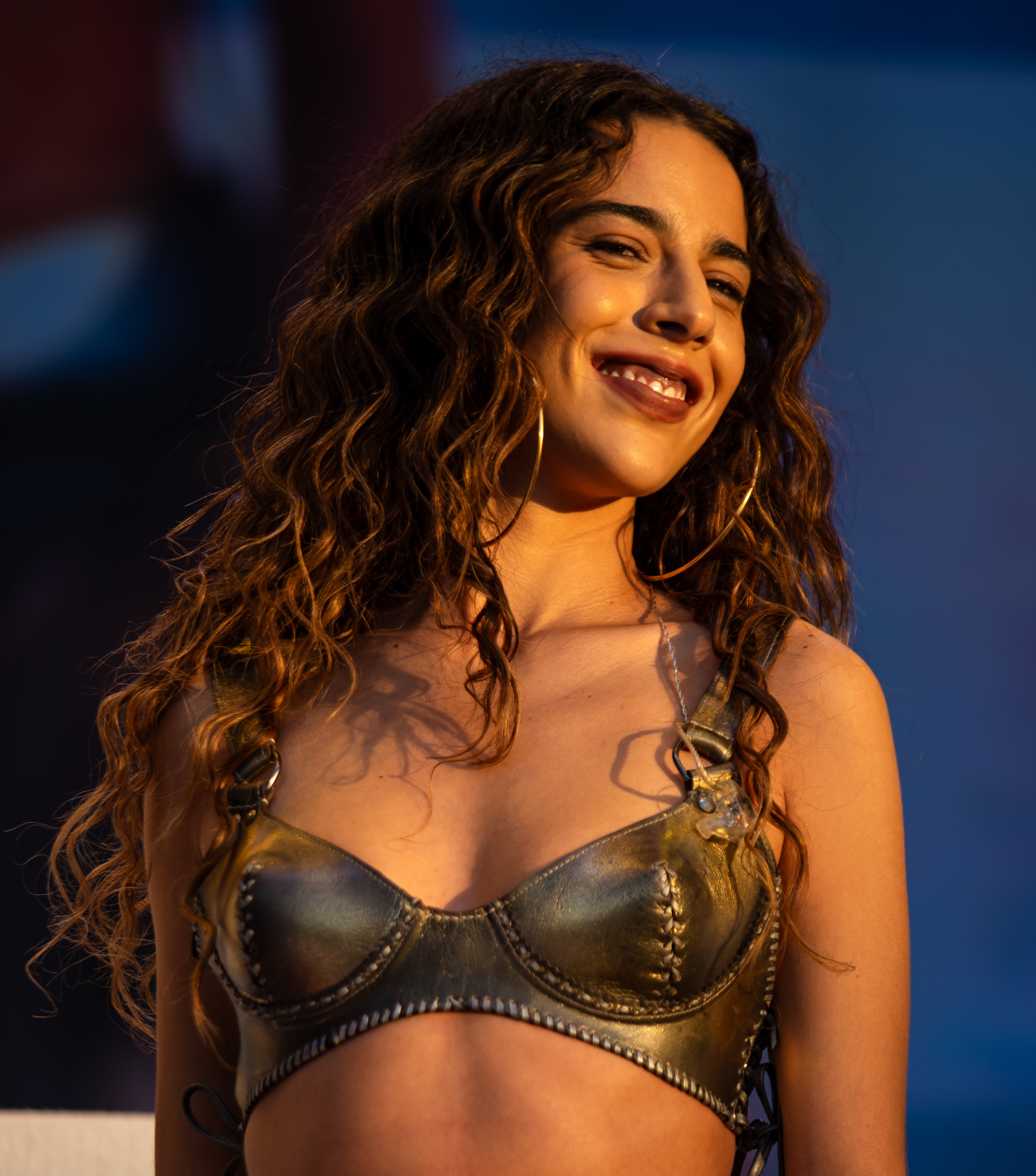
- Sena in 2024
- Born: Marina de Oliveira Sena; 26 September 1996 (age 30); Taiobeiras, Minas Gerais, Brazil
- Occupations: Singer; songwriter; record producer
- Years active: 2014–present
- Height: 172 cm (5 ft 8 in)
- Musical career
- Genres: MPB, pop, indie, experimental
- Instruments: Vocals, guitar, synthesizer
- Website: https://marinasena.com

Marina de Oliveira Sena (born 26 September 1996), known professionally as Marina Sena, is a Brazilian singer, songwriter, and record producer.

== Life and career ==
Born in Taiobeiras, a municipality in the north of Minas Gerais, Sena started composing music at 15 years old, and at 17 years old she was a contestant of The Voice Brasil. She started her professional career in 2015, as the vocalist of the band A Outra Banda da Lua, with whom she released an album and an EP.

In 2019 she formed the pop music group Rosa Neon together with Marcelo Tofani, Mariana Cavanellas, Luiz Gabriel Lopes and Baka, but the band dissolved in 2020, after the publication of the farewell song "A Gente é Demais".

In 2021 she recorded her first solo album, De Primeira, launched by the single "Me Toca". In 2021 she won three Multishow Brazilian Music Awards for revelation artist of the year, best experimental artist and best album. In 2022 she was nominated for two Latin Grammy Awards, for Portuguese Language Contemporary Pop Album and Best Portuguese Language Song ("Por Supuesto").

In 2023 she signed a contract with Sony Music Brazil and announced the release of the second studio album, Vício Inerente, which was launched by four singles, "Tudo Pra Amar Você", "Olho no Gato", "Que Tal" and "Dano Sarrada".

=== 2024–present: Coisas Naturais ===
Marina Sena performing at Sensacional Festival (2024)

In October 2024, during the final shows of the Vício Inerente Tour in Rio de Janeiro, Marina dropped hints about her third studio album. She revealed that the album, then in production, would capture the essence and boldness of her previous works, and performed an unreleased song from the project for the audience.

In December 2024, Marina released the single "Numa Ilha", the lead track of the new project, starring alongside Brazilian actor Johnny Massaro in the music video, with the song featured in a New York Times article about the week's best releases. On 24 March 2025, Marina announced Coisas Naturais, her third album, released the following week. The album, blending pop and MPB, with influences from bossa nova, piseiro, reggae, and pop rock, is the most diverse of her career. According to Marina, the goal was to reconnect with her roots in Taiobeiras and her fearless approach as a vocalist with A Outra Banda da Lua. All tracks debuted among the top 100 on Brazil's Spotify chart, amassing around 4 million streams on the first day. The album achieved gold certification in Brazil, with 40,000 units sold.

To promote Coisas Naturais, Marina embarked on her third solo tour, titled Coisas Naturais Ao Vivo, which included festivals such as Funn in the Federal District, Sensacional in Minas Gerais, and Movimento Cidade in Espírito Santo. Alongside her solo music career, Marina performed "Vá Pro Inferno Com Seu Amor" by Chitãozinho & Xororó at the nominees' ceremony for the 32nd Brazilian Music Awards. She then debuted as a presenter for the new season of TVZ, alongside Gominho. Later, she participated in a re-recording of "Carta de Maria" by Brazilian singer Rubel, originally from the album Beleza. Mas agora a gente faz o que com isso? (2025).

== Discography ==
=== Studio albums ===
- De Primeira (2021)
- Vício Inerente (2023)
- Coisas Naturais (2025)

=== Singles ===
- 2019 – Ombrim (with Rosa Neon and Baka!)
- 2020 – Tela 2.0 (with Baka! and Julio Secchin)
- 2021 – Me Toca
- 2021 – +1 minuto (with Jean Tassy and Iuri Rio Branco)
- 2021 – Voltei pra Mim
- 2021 – Por Supuesto
- 2021 – Te vi na Rua (with Silva and RDD)
- 2022 – Quente e Colorido (with Illy)
- 2022 – Foi Match (with Hitmaker)
- 2022 – Veja Baby (with Lagum)
- 2023 – Tudo pra Amar Você
- 2023 – Olho no Gato
- 2023 – Que Tal
- 2023 – Dano Sarrada
- 2023 – Dano Sarrada (Remix) (with Japãozin)
- 2024 – Numa Ilha

Featurings

- 2019 – Aceso (Gabriela Viegas with Marina Sena)
- 2020 – Checklist (Velejante with Marina Sena)
- 2022 – Se Eu Não Lembrar (BK' with Marina Sena)
- 2022 – Apenas um Neném (Gloria Groove with Marina Sena)
- 2024 – Esquisitice (with Erasmo Carlos)
- 2024 – Labirinto (with Ariel Donato and MC Cabelinho)
- 2024 – Não Posta (with Lou Garcia)
- 2024 – Solta (Histórias de Amor) (with Marcelo Tofani)
- 2024 – Escada do Prédio (with Pedro Sampaio)
- 2025 – Na Minha (with Rael)
- 2025 – O Cerrado Ameaçado (Alexandre Carlo with Marina Sena, Carlos Rennó, César Lacerda)

=== With A Outra Banda da Lua ===
- 2020 – A Outra Banda da Lua
- 2021 – Catapoeira (EP)

== Personal life ==
Sena endorsed the Lula da Silva 2026 presidential campaign in the 2026 general election alongside her ex-boyfriend Juliano Floss.
