= Pinhalzinho, Santa Catarina =

Coordinates: 26°50′52″S 52°59′31″W

- Municipality
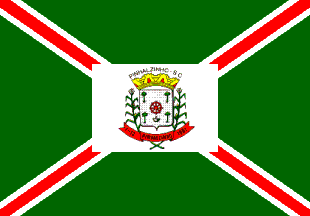
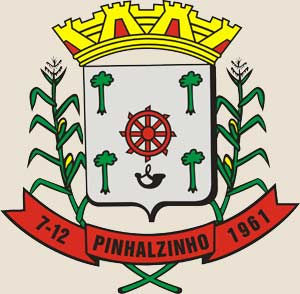
- Flag Coat of arms
- Interactive map of Pinhalzinho, Santa Catarina
- Country: Brazil
- Region: South
- State: Santa Catarina
- Mesoregion: Oeste Catarinense

Population (2020)
  - Total: 20,712
- Time zone: UTC -3

Pinhalzinho is a municipality in the state of Santa Catarina in the South region of Brazil. It was created in 1961, its area being taken from the existing municipality of São Carlos.

== See also ==
- List of municipalities in Santa Catarina
