= 2008 Multishow Brazilian Music Awards =

15th edition of the Multishow Brazilian Music Awards held in 2008

- Date: 1 July 2008
- Location: Theatro Municipal; Rio de Janeiro, Rio de Janeiro, Brazil
- Hosted by: Lázaro Ramos
- Website: gshow.globo.com/multishow/premio-multishow

Television/radio coverage
- Network: Multishow

The 2008 Multishow Brazilian Music Awards (Portuguese: Prêmio Multishow de Música Brasileira 2008) (or simply 2008 Multishow Awards) (Portuguese: Prêmio Multishow 2008) was held on 1 July 2008, at the Theatro Municipal in Rio de Janeiro, Brazil. Lázaro Ramos hosted the ceremony.

== Winners and nominees ==
Nominees were announced on 22 April 2008. Winners are listed first and highlighted in boldface.

Best Male Singer	Best Female Singer
**Di Ferrero**; Caetano Veloso; Chorão; Dinho Ouro Preto; Samuel Rosa	**Ivete Sangalo**; Ana Carolina; Claudia Leitte; Maria Rita; Vanessa da Mata
New Artist	Best Group
**Strike**; Ana Cañas; Diogo Nogueira; Scracho; Vanguart	**NX Zero**; Charlie Brown Jr.; CPM 22; Jota Quest; Natiruts
Best Instrumentalist	Best CD
**Radamés Venâncio (Ivete Sangalo)**; Bino (Cidade Negra); Davi Moraes; Marco Túlio (Jota Quest); Yves Passarell (Capital Inicial)	**Samba Meu – Maria Rita**; Eu nunca Disse Adeus – Capital Inicial; Cidade Cinza – CPM 22; (Des)Concerto ao Vivo – Pitty; Sim – Vanessa da Mata
Best DVD	Best Song
**Multishow ao Vivo: Ivete no Maracanã – Ivete Sangalo**; Rock in Rio 1985 – Os Paralamas do Sucesso; (Des)Concerto ao Vivo – Pitty; Cidade do Samba – Various artists; Pré-Pós-Tudo-Bossa-Band – Zélia Duncan	**"Boa Sorte/Good Luck" – Vanessa da Mata**; "Exttravasa" – Claudia Leitte; "Não Precisa Mudar" – Ivete Sangalo and Saulo Fernandes; "Tá Perdoado" – Maria Rita; "Pela Última Vez" – NX Zero
Best Music Video	Best Show
**"Pontes Indestrutíveis" – Charlie Brown Jr.**; "Aqui" – Capital Inicial; "Nossa Música" – CPM 22; "Pela Última Vez" – NX Zero; "Pulsos" – Pitty	**Ana Carolina**; Charlie Brown Jr.; Maria Rita; Rita Lee; Vanessa da Mata
