= 2005 Multishow Brazilian Music Awards =

12th edition of the Multishow Brazilian Music Awards held in 2005

- Date: 5 July 2005
- Location: Theatro Municipal; Rio de Janeiro, Rio de Janeiro, Brazil
- Hosted by: Regina Casé; Nelson Motta
- Website: gshow.globo.com/multishow/premio-multishow

Television/radio coverage
- Network: Multishow

The 2005 Multishow Brazilian Music Awards (Portuguese: Prêmio Multishow de Música Brasileira 2005) (or simply 2005 Multishow Awards) (Portuguese: Prêmio Multishow 2005) was held on 5 July 2005, at the Theatro Municipal in Rio de Janeiro, Brazil. Regina Casé and Nelson Motta hosted the ceremony.

== Winners and nominees ==
Nominees for each award are listed below; winners are listed first and highlighted in boldface.

Best Male Singer	Best Female Singer
**Marcelo D2**; Caetano Veloso; Gilberto Gil; Marcelo Falcão; Zeca Pagodinho	**Pitty**; Ana Carolina; Ivete Sangalo; Maria Rita; Sandy
New Artist	Best Group
**Motirô**; Black Alien; Dibob; Dead Fish; Rapazolla	**O Rappa**; Charlie Brown Jr.; Jota Quest; Los Hermanos; Skank
Best Instrumentalist	Best CD
**Junior Lima (Sandy & Junior)**; Edgard Scandurra (Ira!); Roberto de Carvalho; Rodrigo Amarante (Los Hermanos); Roberto Frejat (Barão Vermelho)	**Acústico MTV – Marcelo D2**; Tamo Aí na Atividade – Charlie Brown Jr.; Perto de Deus – Cidade Negra; Que Falta Você Me Faz – Maria Bethânia; MTV ao Vivo – Nando Reis
Best DVD	Best Song
**MTV ao Vivo – Ivete Sangalo**; Estampado - Um Instante Que Não Pára – Ana Carolina; Roque Marciano Ao Vivo – Detonautas; Acústico MTV – Marcelo D2; O Baú do Raul – Raul Seixas	**"Vamos Fugir" – Skank**; "Encostar na Tua" – Ana Carolina; "Não Olhe pra Trás" – Capital Inicial; "Ontem" – CPM 22; "Equalize" – Pitty
Best Music Video	Best Show
**"Semana que Vem" – Pitty**; "Fico Assim Sem Você" – Adriana Calcanhotto; "Perto de Deus" – Cidade Negra; "O Salto" – O Rappa; "Nada Vai Me Sufocar" – Sandy & Junior	**O Rappa**; Charlie Brown Jr.; Ivete Sangalo; Pitty; Sandy & Junior
