= 2011 Multishow Brazilian Music Awards =

18th edition of the Multishow Brazilian Music Awards held in 2011

- Date: 6 September 2011
- Location: HSBC Arena; Rio de Janeiro, Rio de Janeiro, Brazil
- Hosted by: Bruno Mazzeo
- Website: gshow.globo.com/multishow/premio-multishow

Television/radio coverage
- Network: Multishow

The 2011 Multishow Brazilian Music Awards (Portuguese: Prêmio Multishow de Música Brasileira 2011) (or simply 2011 Multishow Awards) (Portuguese: Prêmio Multishow 2011) was held on 6 September 2011, at the HSBC Arena in Rio de Janeiro, Brazil. Actor Bruno Mazzeo hosted the ceremony for the second consecutive time.

== Winners and nominees ==
Nominees for each award are listed below; award winners are listed first and highlighted in boldface.

=== Voted categories ===
The winners of the following categories were chosen by fan votes.

Best Male Singer	Best Female Singer
**Di Ferrero**; Luan Santana; Lucas Silveira; Rogerio Flausino; Seu Jorge	**Paula Fernandes**; Ivete Sangalo; Maria Gadú; Pitty; Lu Alone
New Artist	Best Group
**Monique Kessous**; Johnny and the Hookers; Tulipa Ruiz; Emicida; Roberta Spindel	**Exaltasamba**; Restart; NX Zero; Fresno; Skank
Best Sertanejo Artist	Best Instrumentalist
**Paula Fernandes**; Luan Santana; Jorge & Mateus; Victor & Leo; Maria Cecília & Rodolfo	**João Barone (Drums)**; Gee Rocha (Electric guitar); Koba (Electric guitar); Paulinho Fonseca (Drums); Victor Chaves (Acoustic guitar)
Best Album	Best DVD
**By Day – Restart**; Manuscrito – Sandy; Ao Vivo – Luan Santana; Projeto Paralelo – NX Zero; Boa Sorte pra Você – Victor & Leo	**Multishow ao Vivo: Ivete Sangalo no Madison Square Garden – Ivete Sangalo**; Ao Vivo no Rio – Luan Santana; Ao Vivo – Paula Fernandes; 25 Anos ao Vivo – Exaltasamba; Multishow ao Vivo: Maria Gadú – Maria Gadú
Best Song	Best Music Video
**"Onde Estiver" – NX Zero**; "Adrenalina" – Luan Santana; "Fugidinha" – Michel Teló; "Boa Sorte pra Você" – Victor & Leo; "Química do Amor" – Luan Santana and Ivete Sangalo	**"Pra Você Lembrar" – Restart**; "Quem Eu Sou" – Sandy; "Onde Estiver" – NX Zero; "Só Agora" – Pitty; "Depois da Meia Noite" – Capital Inicial
Best Show	Try It
**Luan Santana**; Ivete Sangalo; Caetano and Maria Gadú; Exaltasamba; Victor & Leo	**Garotas Suecas**; VOWE; Madame Zero; Thiago Pethit; Black Drawing Chalks

=== Professional categories ===
Winners of the following categories were chosen by members of the music industry.

Best Male Singer	Best Female Singer
**Marcelo Camelo**; Emicida; Marcelo Jeneci	**Tulipa Ruiz**; Tiê; Vanessa da Mata
Best Group	Best Song
**Holger (TIE)**; **Copacabana Club (TIE)**; Fresno	**"Felicidade" – Marcelo Jeneci**; "Vermelho" – Marcelo Camelo; "Não Existe Amor em SP" – Criolo
Try It
**Criolo (TIE)**; **Momo (TIE)**; **Nevilton (TIE)**
