= Multishow Brazilian Music Award for New Artist =

Brazilian music industry award

- Country: Brazil
- Presented by: Multishow
- First award: 1994
- Most recent winner: Danilo & Davi (2025)

Multishow Brazilian Music Award for New Artist is an award given at the Multishow Brazilian Music Awards, a ceremony that was established in 1994 and originally called the TVZ Awards. The award was first presented at the inaugural ceremony as National New Artist. Between the 2000 and 2004 ceremonies, it was divided into two categories: New Solo Artist and New Group.

== Recipients ==
=== 1990s ===
Year	Image	Recipient	Nominees	Ref.
1994	—N/a		—N/a	
1995		Banda Bel	—N/a	
1996		Pato Fu	—N/a	
1997		Os Virgulóides	—N/a	
1998		Vanessa Rangel	Charlie Brown Jr.; Claudinho & Buchecha; Ivete Sangalo; Zeca Baleiro	
1999		Fat Family	Farofa Carioca; Nativus; Terra Samba; Vinny	

=== 2000s ===
Year	Image	Recipient	Nominees	Ref.
2000		Maurício Manieri (solo)	Ana Carolina; Dudu Nobre; Ivete Sangalo; Wilson Sidereal	
2000		Los Hermanos (group)	Harmonia do Samba; LS Jack; Penélope; Rumbora	
2001		Wanessa Camargo (solo)	Belo; Nando Reis; Pedro Mariano; Max de Castro	
2001		Falamansa (group)	Catedral; KLB; O Surto; Tihuana	
2002		Luciana Mello (solo)	Frejat; Kelly Key; Paula Lima; Robinson Monteiro	
2002		SNZ (group)	Cajamanga; CPM 22; Lampirônicos; Peixelétrico	
2003		Luiza Possi (solo)	Beto Lee; Davi Moraes; Fernanda Porto; Maria Rita	
2003		Rouge (group)	Berimbrown; Detonautas; Rodox; Seu Cuca	
2004		Pitty (solo)	Felipe Dylon; Luka; Preta Gil; Vanessa da Mata	
2004		Babado Novo (group)	Eletrosamba; Kaleidoscópio; Lan Lan e os Elaines; Reação em Cadeia	
2005		Motirô	Black Alien; Dibob; Dead Fish; Rapazolla	
2006		Marjorie Estiano	Cachorro Grande; Forfun; Leela; Luxúria	
2007		NX Zero	Céu; Maskavo; Moptop; Papas da Língua	
2008		Strike	Ana Cañas; Diogo Nogueira; Scracho; Vanguart	
2009		Cine	Gloria; Mallu Magalhães; Primadonna; Túlio Dek	

=== 2010s ===
Year	Image	Recipient	Nominees	Ref.
2010		Luan Santana	Hori; Lu Alone; Maria Gadú; Restart	
2011		Monique Kessous	Emicida; Johnny and The Hookers; Roberta Spindel; Tulipa Ruiz	
2012		Gang do Eletro	Cícero; Silva	
2013		Karol Conká	Anitta; Clarice Falcão; Strobo	
2014		Boogarins	Alice Caymmi; Russo Passapusso	
2015		Ava Rocha	Dônica; Lila	
2016		Liniker e os Caramelows	As Bahias e a Cozinha Mineira; Mahmundi	
2017		Rincon Sapiência	Luiza Lian; Rakta	
2018		Baco Exu do Blues	Edgar; Luedji Luna; Maria Beraldo	
2019		Duda Beat	Josyara; MC Tha	

=== 2020s ===
Year	Image	Recipient	Nominees	Ref.
2020		Jup do Bairro	Ana Frango Elétrico; Rosa Neon	
2021		Marina Sena	Jadsa; João Gomes	
2022		Ana Castela	Bala Desejo; Jovem Dionisio; Mari Fernandez; Nattanzinho; Rachel Reis; Tasha & Tracie; Urias	
2023		Melly	Carol Biazin; Kay Black; Nadson o Ferinha; Thiago Pantaleão; Veigh	
2024		Zaynara	Duquesa; Grelo; Jota.pê; Os Garotin; Yago Oproprio	
2025		Danilo & Davi	Ajuliacosta; Joyce Alane; Léo Foguete; Panda; Yan	
