= 2002 Multishow Brazilian Music Awards =

9th edition of the Multishow Brazilian Music Awards held in 2002

- Date: 5 June 2002
- Location: Theatro Municipal; Rio de Janeiro, Rio de Janeiro, Brazil
- Hosted by: Nelson Motta; Fernanda Torres
- Website: gshow.globo.com/multishow/premio-multishow

Television/radio coverage
- Network: Multishow

The 2002 Multishow Brazilian Music Awards (Portuguese: Prêmio Multishow de Música Brasileira 2002) (or simply 2002 Multishow Awards) (Portuguese: Prêmio Multishow 2002) was held on 5 June 2002, at the Theatro Municipal in Rio de Janeiro, Brazil. Nelson Motta and Fernanda Torres hosted the ceremony for the third consecutive time.

== Winners and nominees ==
Nominees for each award are listed below; winners are listed first and highlighted in boldface.

Best Male Singer	Best Female Singer
**Roberto Carlos**; Arnaldo Antunes; Caetano Veloso; Leonardo; Lulu Santos	**Sandy**; Ana Carolina; Daniela Mercury; Ivete Sangalo; Marisa Monte
Best Group	New Solo Artist
**Titãs**; Capital Inicial; Ira!; KLB; Skank	**Luciana Mello**; Frejat; Kelly Key; Paula Lima; Robinson Monteiro
New Group	Best Instrumentalist
**SNZ**; Cajamanga; CPM 22; Lampirônicos; Peixelétrico	**Edgar Scandurra (Ira!)**; Davi Moraes; Igor Cavalera (Sepultura); John Ulhoa (Pato Fu); Lenine
Best CD	Best DVD
**Acústico MTV – Cássia Eller**; Paradeiro – Arnaldo Antunes; Bloco do Eu Sozinho – Los Hermanos; Acústico MTV – Roberto Carlos; Sandy & Junior – Sandy & Junior	**Marisa Monte**; Adriana Calcanhotto; Caetano Veloso; Cássia Eller; Legião Urbana
Best Song	Best Music Video
**"Mutante" – Daniela Mercury**; "Festa" – Ivete Sangalo; "Todas as Coisas do Mundo" – Leonardo; "A Sua" – Marisa Monte; "Pra Você Eu Digo Sim" – Rita Lee	**"Essa Mulher" – Arnaldo Antunes**; "Entre Seus Rins" – Ira!; "Minha Timidez" – KLB; "Todas as Coisas do Mundo" – Leonardo; "O Amor Faz" – Sandy & Júnior
Best Show
**Sandy & Junior**; Cássia Eller; KLB; Skank; Zeca Pagodinho
