= 1999 Multishow Brazilian Music Awards =

6th edition of the Multishow Brazilian Music Awards held in 1999

- Date: 25 May 1999
- Location: Canecão; Rio de Janeiro, Rio de Janeiro, Brazil
- Hosted by: João Marcello Bôscoli; Alessandra Calor
- Website: gshow.globo.com/multishow/premio-multishow

Television/radio coverage
- Network: Multishow

The 1999 Multishow Brazilian Music Awards (Portuguese: Prêmio Multishow de Música Brasileira 1999) (or simply 1999 Multishow Awards) (Portuguese: Prêmio Multishow 1999) was held on 25 May 1999, at the Canecão in Rio de Janeiro, Brazil. João Marcello Bôscoli and Alessandra Calor hosted the ceremony.

== Winners and nominees ==
Nominees for each award are listed below; winners are listed first and highlighted in boldface.

Best Male Singer	Best Female Singer
**Caetano Veloso**; Djavan; Ed Motta; Milton Nascimento; Samuel Rosa	**Ivete Sangalo**; Daniela Mercury; Marisa Monte; Rita Lee; Zélia Duncan
Best Group	New Artist
**Titãs**; Jota Quest; Os Paralamas do Sucesso; Pato Fu; Skank	**Fat Family**; Farofa Carioca; Nativus; Terra Samba; Vinny
Best Instrumentalist	Best CD
**João Barone (Os Paralamas do Sucesso)**; Carlinhos Brown; Marcos Suzano; Roberto de Carvalho; Tony Bellotto (Titãs)	**Volume Dois – Titãs**; As Cidades – Chico Buarque; De Volta ao Planeta – Jota Quest; Hey Na Na – Os Paralamas do Sucesso; Siderado – Skank
Best Song	Best Music Video
**"É Preciso Saber Viver" – Titãs**; "Carro Velho" – Banda Eva; "Sozinho" – Caetano Veloso; "Fácil" – Jota Quest; "Resposta" – Skank	**"Saideira" – Skank**; "Por Você" – Barão Vermelho; "Eu Sei" – Pato Fu; "É Preciso Saber Viver" – Titãs; "Verbos Sujei" – Zélia Duncan
Best Show
**Terra Samba**; Jota Quest; Os Paralamas do Sucesso; Skank; Titãs
