= 2007 Multishow Brazilian Music Awards =

14th edition of the Multishow Brazilian Music Awards held in 2007

- Date: 3 July 2007
- Location: Theatro Municipal; Rio de Janeiro, Rio de Janeiro, Brazil
- Hosted by: Fernanda Torres
- Website: gshow.globo.com/multishow/premio-multishow

Television/radio coverage
- Network: Multishow

The 2007 Multishow Brazilian Music Awards (Portuguese: Prêmio Multishow de Música Brasileira 2007) (or simply 2007 Multishow Awards) (Portuguese: Prêmio Multishow 2007) was held on 3 July 2007, at the Theatro Municipal in Rio de Janeiro, Brazil. Actress Fernanda Torres hosted the ceremony.

== Winners and nominees ==
Nominees for each award are listed below; winners are listed first and highlighted in boldface.

Best Male Singer	Best Female Singer
**Rogério Flausino**; Caetano Veloso; Chorão; Lulu Santos; Nando Reis	**Ana Carolina**; Claudia Leitte; Ivete Sangalo; Megh Stock; Negra Li
New Artist	Best Group
**NX Zero**; Céu; Maskavo; Moptop; Papas da Língua	**Capital Inicial**; Babado Novo; CPM 22; Luxúria; Skank
Best Instrumentalist	Best CD
**Champignon (Revolucionnários)**; Japinha (CPM 22); Marco Túlio (Jota Quest); Martin Mendonça (Pitty); Thiago Castanho (Charlie Brown Jr.)	**Multishow ao Vivo: Ivete no Maracanã – Ivete Sangalo**; Dois Quartos – Ana Carolina; Armandinho: Ao Vivo – Armandinho; Cê – Caetano Veloso; Meu Samba é Assim – Marcelo D2
Best DVD	Best Song
**MTV ao Vivo – CPM 22**; Rock in Rio: Cássia Eller ao Vivo – Cássia Eller; Até Onde Vai – Jota Quest; Segundo – Maria Rita; Zeca Pagodinho: Ao Vivo – Zeca Pagodinho	**"Senhor do Tempo" – Charlie Brown Jr.**; "Berimbau Metalizado" – Ivete Sangalo; "Você Vai Estar na Minha" – Negra Li; "Eu Sei" – Papas da Língua; "Na Sua Estante" – Pitty
Best Music Video	Best Show
**"Dor de Verdade" – Marcelo D2**; "Eu Nunca Disse Adeus" – Capital Inicial; "Eu Vou Tentar" – Ira!; "Você Vai Estar na Minha" – Negra Li; "Na Sua Estante" – Pitty	**Ivete Sangalo**; Caetano Veloso; Jota Quest; Marcelo D2; O Rappa
