= 2009 Multishow Brazilian Music Awards =

16th edition of the Multishow Brazilian Music Awards held in 2009

- Date: 18 August 2009
- Location: Citibank Hall; Rio de Janeiro, Rio de Janeiro, Brazil
- Hosted by: Fernanda Torres
- Website: gshow.globo.com/multishow/premio-multishow

Television/radio coverage
- Network: Multishow

The 2009 Multishow Brazilian Music Awards (Portuguese: Prêmio Multishow de Música Brasileira 2009) (or simply 2009 Multishow Awards) (Portuguese: Prêmio Multishow 2009) was held on 18 August 2009, at the Citibank Hall in Rio de Janeiro, Brazil. Actress Fernanda Torres hosted the ceremony.

== Winners and nominees ==
Nominees were announced on 12 May 2009. Winners are listed first and highlighted in boldface.

Best Male Singer	Best Female Singer
**Seu Jorge**; Lenine; Marcelo D2; Rogério Flausino; Samuel Rosa	**Marisa Monte**; Ana Carolina; Ivete Sangalo; Roberta Sá; Vanessa da Mata
New Artist	Best Group
**Cine**; Gloria; Mallu Magalhães; Primadonna; Túlio Dek	**Fresno**; Banda Eva; Jota Quest; NX Zero; Skank
Best Instrumentalist	Best Album
**Débora Teicher (Scracho)**; Christiaan Oyens (El Niño); Gee Rocha (NX Zero); Gigi (Ivete Sangalo); Martin Mendonça (Pitty)	**Agora** – NX Zero; Ao Vivo em Copacabana – Claudia Leitte; La Plata – Jota Quest; A Arte do Barulho – Marcelo D2; Estandarte – Skank
Best DVD	Best Song
**Infinito ao Meu Redor – Marisa Monte**; Multishow ao Vivo: Ana Carolina - Dois Quartos – Ana Carolina; Multishow ao Vivo: Capital Inicial em Brasília – Capital Inicial; 62 Mil Horas Até Aqui – NX Zero; Paralamas e Titãs Juntos e Ao Vivo – Os Paralamas do Sucesso and Titãs	**"Amado" – Vanessa da Mata**; "Beijar na Boca" – Claudia Leitte; "Desabafo" – Marcelo D2; "Não é Proibido" – Marisa Monte; "Ainda Gosto Dela" – Skank and Negra Li
Best Music Video	Best Show
**"Ainda Gosto Dela" – Skank and Negra Li**; "Uma Música" – Fresno; "La Plata" – Jota Quest; "Desabafo" – Marcelo D2; "Monstro Invisível" – O Rappa	**Capital Inicial**; Jota Quest; Marcelo D2; Skank; Zeca Pagodinho
TVZé Award	Initiative
**"Cadê Dalila" – Kadu Gauer (Ivete Sangalo)**; "Beijar na Boca" – Renato Iezzi (Claudia Leitte); "Ainda Gosto Dela" – Tiago Cardoso (Skank); "Cedo ou Tarde" – Cezar Correa (NX Zero); "Burguesinha" – Lívia Nicoliello (Seu Jorge)	**Skank**
