= 2012 Multishow Brazilian Music Awards =

19th edition of the Multishow Brazilian Music Awards held in 2012

- Date: 18 September 2012
- Location: HSBC Arena; Rio de Janeiro, Rio de Janeiro, Brazil
- Hosted by: Ivete Sangalo; Paulo Gustavo
- Website: gshow.globo.com/multishow/premio-multishow

Television/radio coverage
- Network: Multishow

The 2012 Multishow Brazilian Music Awards (Portuguese: Prêmio Multishow de Música Brasileira 2012) (or simply 2012 Multishow Awards) (Portuguese: Prêmio Multishow 2012) was held on 18 September 2012, at the HSBC Arena in Rio de Janeiro, Brazil. Ivete Sangalo and Paulo Gustavo hosted the ceremony.

== Winners and nominees ==
Winners are listed first and highlighted in boldface.

=== Voted categories ===
The winners of the following categories were chosen by fan votes.

Best Male Singer	Best Female Singer
**Thiaguinho**; Di Ferrero; Gusttavo Lima; Luan Santana; Michel Teló	**Ivete Sangalo**; Ana Carolina; Maria Gadú; Paula Fernandes; Pitty
Best Group	Best Show
**NX Zero**; Aviões do Forró; Banda Calypso; Fresno; Sorriso Maroto	**Paula Fernandes**; Jorge & Mateus; Jota Quest; Luan Santana; O Rappa
Best Song	Earworm Song
**"Problemas" – Ana Carolina**; "Darte" – Ivete Sangalo; "Depois" – Marisa Monte; "Nêga" – Luan Santana; "Quero Toda Noite" – Fiuk and Jorge Ben Jor	**"Ai Se Eu Te Pego" – Michel Teló**; "Assim Você Mata o Papai" – Sorriso Maroto; "Balada" – Gusttavo Lima; "Ex Mai Love" – Gaby Amarantos; "Menina Estranha" – Restart
Try It
**Banda Tereza**; Banda Baleia; Banda Dorgas; Banda Valetes; Banda Volk

=== Professional categories ===
Winners of the following categories were chosen by members of the music industry.

Best Album	New Hit
**Tudo Tanto – Tulipa Ruiz**; O Deus Que Devasta Mas Também Cura – Lucas Santtana; Recanto – Gal Costa	**"Ex Mai Love" – Gaby Amarantos**; "Dois Café" – Tulipa Ruiz; "É" – Tulipa Ruiz
New Artist	Best Show
**Gang do Eletro**; Cícero; Silva	**Gal Costa – Recanto**; Marcelo Camelo – Voz e Violão; Marisa Monte – Verdade, Uma Ilusão
Version of the Year	Best Music Video
**"Conversa de Botas Batidas" – Cícero**; "Babydoll de Nyllon" – Bonde do Rolê; "Rosa (Last Night)" – Banda Uó	**"66" – O Terno**; "Mariô" – Criolo; "Velha e Louca" – Mallu Magalhães
Shared Song	Parallel Project
**"Canções de Apartamento" – Cícero**; "O Deus Que Devasta Mas Também Cura" – Lucas Santtana; "Tudo Tanto" – Tulipa Ruiz	**Agridoce (Pitty and Martin Mendonça)**; Los Sebozos Postizos (Dengue, Jorge do Peixe, Lúcio Maia and Pupillo da Nação Zumbi); Passo Torto (Romulo Fróes, Kiko Dinucci, Rodrigo Campos and Marcelo Cabral)
More More Award
**Michel Teló**
