= 2003 Multishow Brazilian Music Awards =

10th edition of the Multishow Brazilian Music Awards held in 2003

- Date: 3 June 2003
- Location: Theatro Municipal; Rio de Janeiro, Rio de Janeiro, Brazil
- Hosted by: Nelson Motta; Fernanda Torres
- Website: gshow.globo.com/multishow/premio-multishow

Television/radio coverage
- Network: Multishow

The 2003 Multishow Brazilian Music Awards (Portuguese: Prêmio Multishow de Música Brasileira 2003) (or simply 2003 Multishow Awards) (Portuguese: Prêmio Multishow 2003) was held on 3 June 2003, at the Theatro Municipal in Rio de Janeiro, Brazil. Nelson Motta and Fernanda Torres hosted the ceremony for the fourth consecutive time.

== Winners and nominees ==
Nominees for each award are listed below; winners are listed first and highlighted in boldface.

Best Male Singer	Best Female Singer
**Gilberto Gil**; Jorge Vercillo; Lenine; Leonardo; Milton Nascimento	**Ivete Sangalo**; Adriana Calcanhotto; Marisa Monte; Rita Lee; Sandy
Best Group	New Solo Artist
**Os Paralamas do Sucesso**; Capital Inicial; Kid Abelha; Skank; Titãs	**Luiza Possi**; Beto Lee; Davi Moraes; Fernanda Porto; Maria Rita
New Group	Best Instrumentalist
**Rouge**; Berimbrown; Detonautas; Rodox; Seu Cuca	**João Barone (Os Paralamas do Sucesso)**; Carlinhos Brown; Edgar Scandurra (Ira!); Junior Lima (Sandy & Junior); Milton Guedes
Best CD	Best DVD
**Tribalistas – Tribalistas**; Deixa a Vida Me Levar – Zeca Pagodinho; Acústico MTV – Kid Abelha; Maricotinha Ao Vivo – Maria Bethânia; Ao Vivo no Maracanã – Sandy & Junior	**Tribalistas**; Erasmo Carlos; Jorge Ben Jor; Os Paralamas do Sucesso; Rouge
Best Song	Best Music Video
**"Já Sei Namorar" – Tribalistas**; "Carla" – LS Jack; "Que Nem Maré" – Jorge Vercilo; "Na Moral" – Jota Quest; "Te Amo Demais" – Leonardo	**"Segredos" – Frejat**; "Que Nem Maré – Jorge Vercilo; "Kaya N'Gan Daya" – Gilberto Gil; "Love Never Fails" – Sandy & Junior; "Já Sei Namorar" – Tribalistas
Best Show
**Sandy & Junior**; Capital Inicial; KLB; Maria Bethânia; Os Paralamas do Sucesso
