= 2000 Multishow Brazilian Music Awards =

7th edition of the Multishow Brazilian Music Awards held in 2000

- Date: 16 May 2000
- Location: Theatro Municipal; Rio de Janeiro, Rio de Janeiro, Brazil
- Hosted by: Nelson Motta; Fernanda Torres
- Website: gshow.globo.com/multishow/premio-multishow

Television/radio coverage
- Network: Multishow

The 2000 Multishow Brazilian Music Awards (Portuguese: Prêmio Multishow de Música Brasileira 2000) (or simply 2000 Multishow Awards) (Portuguese: Prêmio Multishow 2000) was held on 16 May 2000, at the Theatro Municipal in Rio de Janeiro, Brazil. Nelson Motta and Fernanda Torres hosted the ceremony.

== Winners and nominees ==
Nominees for each award are listed below; winners are listed first and highlighted in boldface.

Best Male Singer	Best Female Singer
**Djavan**; Caetano Veloso; Chico Buarque; Maurício Manieri; Rodolfo Abrantes	**Sandy**; Cássia Eller; Érika Martins; Ivete Sangalo; Marisa Monte
Best Group	New Solo Artist
**Raimundos**; Jota Quest; Los Hermanos; Os Paralamas do Sucesso; Titãs	**Maurício Manieri**; Ana Carolina; Dudu Nobre; Ivete Sangalo; Wilson Sideral
New Group	Best Instrumentalist
**Los Hermanos**; Harmonia do Samba; LS Jack; Penélope; Rumbora	**Tony Bellotto (Titãs)**; Digão (Raimundos); Jaques Morelenbaum; João Barone (Os Paralamas do Sucesso); Paulo Moura
Best CD	Best Song
**Djavan Ao Vivo – Djavan**; Preço Curto... Prazo Longo – Charlie Brown Jr.; Chico Ao Vivo – Chico Buarque; Só no Forevis – Raimundos; As Quatro Estações – Sandy & Junior	**"Anna Júlia" – Los Hermanos**; "Carioca" – Chico Buarque; "Deixa Eu Falar" – Raimundos; "Mulher de Fases" – Raimundos; "Imortal" – Sandy & Junior
Best Music Video	Best Show
**"Minha Alma (A Paz Que Eu Não Quero)" – O Rappa**; "O Meu Amor" – Chico Buarque; "Anna Júlia" – Los Hermanos; "A Mais Pedida" – Raimundos; "Imortal" – Sandy & Junior	**Djavan**; Charlie Brown Jr.; Chico Buarque; Jota Quest; Raimundos
