= 2001 Multishow Brazilian Music Awards =

8th edition of the Multishow Brazilian Music Awards held in 2001

- Date: 22 May 2001
- Location: Theatro Municipal; Rio de Janeiro, Rio de Janeiro, Brazil
- Hosted by: Nelson Motta; Fernanda Torres
- Website: gshow.globo.com/multishow/premio-multishow

Television/radio coverage
- Network: Multishow

The 2001 Multishow Brazilian Music Awards (Portuguese: Prêmio Multishow de Música Brasileira 2001) (or simply 2001 Multishow Awards) (Portuguese: Prêmio Multishow 2001) was held on 22 May 2001, at the Theatro Municipal in Rio de Janeiro, Brazil. Nelson Motta and Fernanda Torres hosted the ceremony for the second consecutive time.

== Winners and nominees ==
Nominees were announced on 13 March 2001. Winners are listed first and highlighted in boldface.

Best Male Singer	Best Female Singer
**Caetano Veloso**; Gilberto Gil; Lulu Santos; Maurício Manieri; Zeca Pagodinho	**Marisa Monte**; Adriana Calcanhotto; Daniela Mercury; Ivete Sangalo; Sandy
Best Group	New Solo Artist
**Capital Inicial**; Jota Quest; O Rappa; Os Paralamas do Sucesso; Raimundos	**Wanessa Camargo**; Belo; Nando Reis; Pedro Mariano; Max de Castro
New Group	Best Instrumentalist
**Falamansa**; Catedral; KLB; O Surto; Tihuana	**Lulu Santos**; Digão (Raimundos); Edgard Scandurra (Ira!); Igor Cavalera (Sepultura); Marcelo Yuka (O Rappa)
Best CD	Best Song
**Memórias, Crônicas, e Declarações de Amor – Marisa Monte**; Nadando com os Tubarões – Charlie Brown Jr.; Oxigênio – Jota Quest; Beat Beleza – Ivete Sangalo; Quatro Estações: O Show – Sandy & Junior	**"Se Eu Não Te Amasse Tanto Assim" – Ivete Sangalo**; "Devolva-me" – Adriana Calcanhotto; "Esperando na Janela" – Gilberto Gil; "Amor I Love You" – Marisa Monte; "Balada do Amor Inabalável" – Skank
Best Music Video	Best Show
**"A Lenda" – Sandy & Junior**; "Devolva-me" – Adriana Calcanhotto; "Rubão, o Dono do Mundo" – Charlie Brown Jr.; "Amor I Love You" – Marisa Monte; "Made in Japan" – Pato Fu	**Sandy & Junior**; Charlie Brown Jr.; Marisa Monte; O Rappa; Raimundos
