= 1998 Multishow Brazilian Music Awards =

5th edition of the Multishow Brazilian Music Awards held in 1998

- Date: 27 May 1998
- Location: Canecão; Rio de Janeiro, Rio de Janeiro, Brazil
- Hosted by: Toni Garrido; Alessandra Calor
- Website: gshow.globo.com/multishow/premio-multishow

Television/radio coverage
- Network: Multishow

The 1998 Multishow Brazilian Music Awards (Portuguese: Prêmio Multishow de Música Brasileira 1998) or simply 1998 Multishow Awards (Prêmio Multishow 1998) was held on 27 May 1998, at the Canecão in Rio de Janeiro, Brazil. Toni Garrido and Alessandra Calor hosted the ceremony.

== Winners and nominees ==
Nominees for each award are listed below; winners are listed first and highlighted in boldface.

Best Male Singer	Best Female Singer
**Gabriel, o Pensador**; Caetano Veloso; Milton Nascimento	**Marisa Monte**; Daniela Mercury; Gal Costa
Best Group	New Artist
**Titãs**; Os Paralamas do Sucesso; Só pra Contrariar	**Vanessa Rangel**; Charlie Brown Jr.; Claudinho & Buchecha
Best Instrumentalist	Best CD
**Carlinhos Brown**; Léo Gandelman; Hermeto Pascoal	**Acústico MTV – Titãs**; Banda Eva Ao Vivo – Banda Eva; Quebra-Cabeça – Gabriel, o Pensador
Best Song	Best Music Video
**"Palpite" – Vanessa Rangel**; "Os Cegos do Castelo" – Titãs; "Cachimbo da Paz" – Gabriel, o Pensador	**"Cachimbo da Paz" – Gabriel, o Pensador**; "Os Cegos do Castelo" – Titãs; "Uma Partida de Futebol" – Skank
Best Show
**Titãs**; Banda Eva; Amigos
