= Sarah Sheeva =

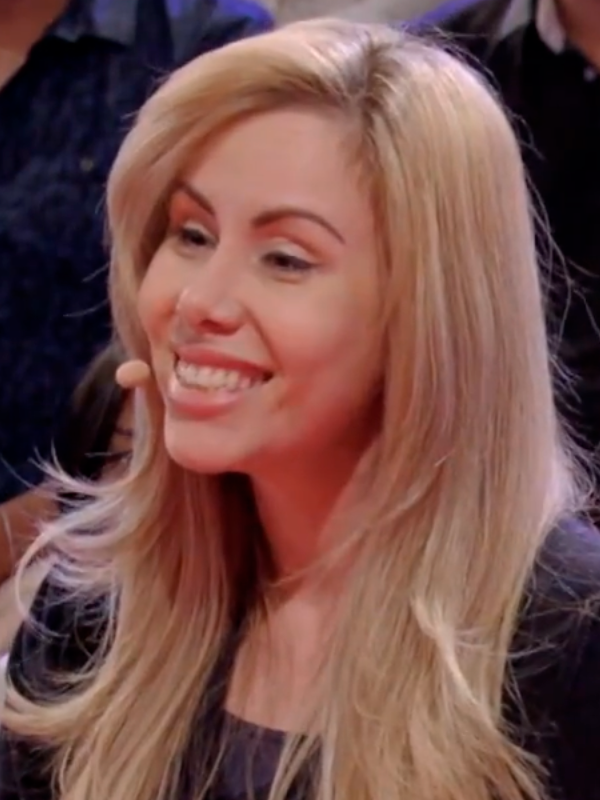
- Sarah Sheeva in 2019.

Background information
- Born: Riroca Cidade Gomes; 10 February 1973 (age 53); Rio de Janeiro, Rio de Janeiro, Brazil
- Genres: Contemporary Christian music, pop music
- Occupations: Singer, songwriter, writer, pastor
- Instrument: Vocals
- Years active: 1994–present
- Label: Independent
- Website: sarahsheeva.com

Sarah Sheeva Cidade Gomes (born Riroca Cidade Gomes, 10 February 1973) is a Brazilian singer, songwriter, writer, and pastor.

== Biography ==
Born with the name "Riroca", at age 14 her name was changed to "Sarah Sheeva." She is the daughter of the two great Brazilian musicians, Baby Consuelo and Pepeu Gomes.

In 1991, she had her first child, Rannah Sheeva.

Sheeva began her singing career in 1994, as a backing vocalist for her parents.

In 1999, Sheeva formed the pop group SNZ, along with her sisters, Nãna Shara and Zabelê Gomes. The group's first album was released by Warner Music. The second album, titled Sarahnãnazabelê, was a big hit, with the song "Nothing's Gonna Change My Love For You"/"Nada vai Tirar Você de Mim" which was the soundtrack of the Brazilian soap opera Um Anjo Caiu do Céu and a great success. Sheeva left the SNZ group in 2003 to devote herself to the gospel and become a preacher and missionary.

In 2005, she released her first gospel music album, Tudo Mudou, and in 2007 her first book, Defraudação Emocional.

Sheeva was the first in her family to become evangelical, in October 1997. Two years later, her mother, Baby Consuelo, also became a Christian, in part due to Sheeva's influence.

One of her most popular works is a book directed at women, called Cult of the Princesses, which aims to encourage values that have been lost in the current culture. The book encourages women to value themselves more through how they dress and social behavior.

Sheeva has a great friendship with the singer Ana Paula Valadão, leader of Christian band Diante do Trono and Ludmila Ferber.

== Discography ==
With SNZ

- SNZ (2000)
- Sarahnãnazabelê (2001)
- Remix Hits (2002)

Solo career

- Tudo Mudou (2005)

== Bibliography ==
- Defraudação Emocional (2007)
- Onde Foi Que Eu Errei? (2008)
