= Alto Garças =

Coordinates: 16°56′S 53°32′W

- Municipality
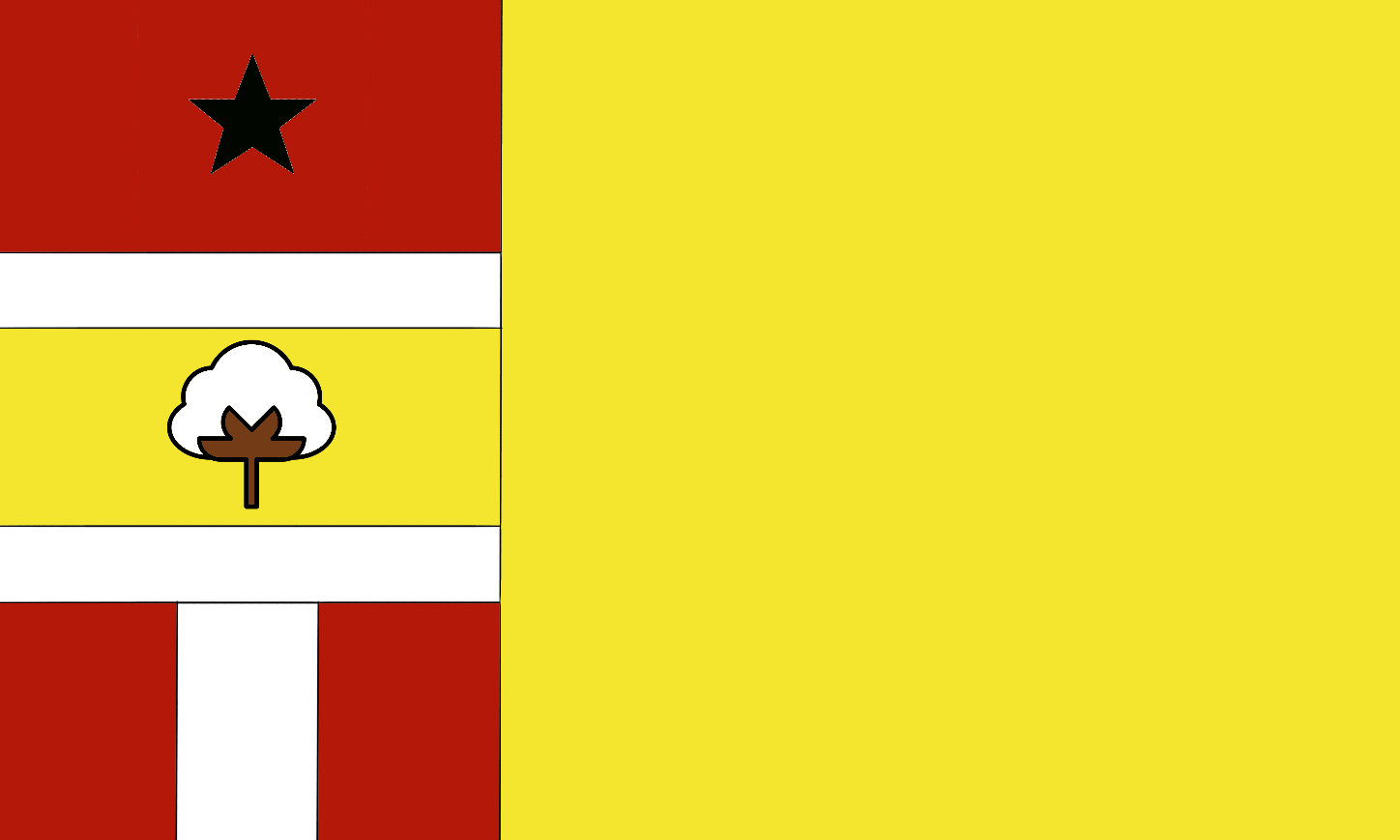
- Flag

- Country: Brazil
- Region: Center-West
- State: Mato Grosso
- Mesoregion: Sudeste Mato-Grossense

Population (2020)
  - Total: 12,151
- Time zone: UTC−3 (BRT)

Alto Garças is a municipality) in the south-east of the Brazilian State of Mato Grosso with a population of about 12,000 on an area of 3672 km^{2}. The distance to the state capital Cuiabá is approximately 350 km. In 1933 Alto Garças became a district of the municipality of Santa Rita do Araguaia and on 10 December 1953 it was separated as an independent entity. Alto Garças is part of the micro-region Alto Araguaia.

Settlement began in the early 20th century by adventurers looking for precious stones and other natural resources. These days mining for gemstones, notably diamonds, remains a major factor besides agriculture, where soy, cotton and grass for stock feed are prevailing.

The climate is tropical wet with June to August as the dry months. Precipitation reaches its peak in December and the annual average is 1950 mm. The average temperature is 22 °C. The temperature extremes hitherto have been 38 °C and 0 °C.

For tourists Alto Garças offers charming rivers and waterfalls. Some larger farms offer holiday accommodation. The calendar is dominated by the carnival, here called Garçafolia and the celebrations in honour to Nossa Senhora de Aparecida on 12 October.

Vanessa da Mata, a pop singer that was born here in 1976, has found international acclaim.

== See also ==
- List of municipalities in Mato Grosso
