= Zaynara =

- Born: Zaynara Damasceno Cruz; August 8, 2001 (age 25); Cametá, Pará, Brazil
- Occupation: Singer · songwriter
- Musical career
- Genre: Beat Melody
- Instrument: Vocals
- Label: Sony Music

Zaynara Damasceno Cruz (born August 8, 2001) is a Brazilian singer and songwriter. She won the Multishow Brazilian Music Award for New Artist in 2024.

== Biography ==
Zaynara is the daughter of musicians Nildo Assunção and Cristiane Damasceno Cruz.

=== Career ===
She first came into contact with music at the age of 8 in the Banda Invencíveis, a family group whose drummer was his father. At the age of 14, she participated for the first time in the band's DVD. At the age of 16, she released her first album, Simplesmente Diferente, a compilation of re-recordings in a brega rhythm.

In 2021, she released her first single "Traz o Nosso Amor de Volta" and in 2022 her first album, É Beat Melody, by Sony Music. In 2024, she released the singles "Sou do Norte", "Quem Manda em Mim" in partnership with singer and drag queen Pabllo Vittar and "Aquele Alguém" with singer Joelma. In December 2024, she won the Multishow Brazilian Music Award for New Artist.

== Discography ==
Studio albums

Title	Details
É Beat Melody	Release: December 22, 2022; Formats: CD, streaming; Label: Sony Music

Singles

Title	Year	Album
"Traz o Nosso Amor de Volta"	2021	É Beat Melody
"Tô em Outra (Will Love RMX)" (with AQNO)	2024	Added to no albums
"Eu Quero Mais" (with Felipe Cordeiro)	2024	Added to no albums
"Sou do Norte"	2024	Added to no albums
"Quem Manda em Mim" (solo and/or with Pabllo Vittar)	2024	É Beat Melody
"Aquele Alguém" (with Joelma)	2024	Added to no albums
