= Dibob =

Brazilian pop punk band

- Origin: Rio de Janeiro, Brazil
- Genres: Alternative rock, pop rock, pop punk, melodic hardcore
- Years active: 2001–2011, 2015–present
- Labels: BMG, Som Livre
- Members: Dedeco; Gesta; Miguel; Faucom

Dibob is a Brazilian pop punk band from Rio de Janeiro, popular throughout the mid- to late 2000s and famous for their humorous songs. Formed in 2001 by friends Miguel, Gesta, Faucom and Dedeco, they initially began the project just to "amuse themselves"; their name, "Dibob", is a contraction of the Portuguese-language expression "de bobeira", meaning "goofing off". Their debut EP Markebra was self-released in 2003, after which the critically acclaimed full-length albums O Fantástico Mundo Dibob (2004) and A Ópera do Cafajeste (2007) followed. For the release of the latter, a huge show at the now-defunct music venue Canecão was organized.

In the 2005 edition of the MTV Video Music Brazil award, they performed a cover of Ultraje a Rigor's "Nós Vamos Invadir Sua Praia" alongside Leela, Ramirez and Forfun, with whom they would develop a strong friendship. In 2012 they collaborated on the song "Rio Porque Tô no Rio", described as an ode to Rio de Janeiro.

In 2009, vocalist Dedeco left the band, and bassist Gesta took over the lead vocals; as a trio they would release the cover album Resgate in 2010. Dedeco returned the following year, but they announced they would be ceasing their activities soon after. Following a 4-year hiatus, they confirmed they would return to perform; in 2020 they played at the Rio Rock Tour festival alongside Strike, Catch Side and Darvin.

In 2016 Faucom formed the side project Tivoli alongside members of Forfun and Ramirez, and the supergroup Riocore All Stars in 2018, also with former members of Forfun, Ramirez and Scracho.

== Band members ==
- Dedeco – lead vocals, rhythm guitar (2001–2009, 2011, 2015–present)
- Gesta – lead vocals, bass (2001–2011, 2015–present)
- Miguel – lead guitar, backing vocals (2001–2011, 2015–present)
- Faucom – drums (2001–2011, 2015–present)

== Discography ==
=== Studio albums ===
- (2004) O Fantástico Mundo Dibob
- (2007) A Ópera do Cafajeste
- (2010) Resgate
- (2024) Ainda

=== EPs ===
- (2003) Markebra
