= NX Zero (album) =

Studio album by NX Zero
- Released: 2006
- Genre: Alternative rock; emo
- Length: 54:00
- Language: Portuguese
- Label: Universal Music
- Producer: Rick Bonadio, Rodrigo Castanho

NX Zero chronology
Diálogo? (2004)	NX Zero (2006)	Agora (2008)

Singles from NX Zero
- 1. "Além de Mim"; 2. "Razões e Emoções"; 3. "Pela Última Vez"

NX Zero is the first major label release and second studio album by Brazilian rock band NX Zero, released in 2006 by Universal Music. It was certified Platinum and has sold more than 100 thousand copies.

== Track listing ==
No.	Title	Lyrics	Music	Length
1.	"Além de Mim"	Di, Fi, Gee	Di, Gee	3:24
2.	"Consequência"	Di, Gee	Di, Gee	2:49
3.	"Razões e Emoções"	Di, Gee	Di, Gee	3:42
4.	"Um Pouco Mais"	Rodrigo Koala	Di, Gee	3:29
5.	"Ilusão"	Daniel, Yuri Nishida	Fi, Yuri Nishida	3:37
6.	"Apenas Um Olhar"	Daniel, Fi, Gee, Yuri Nishida	Fi, Gee, Yuri Nishida	3:35
7.	"Pela Última Vez"	Di, Gee	Di, Gee	3:44
8.	"La Prision"	Di, Gee	Di, Fi, Gee	3:25
9.	"Incompleta"	Di, Gee	Di, Gee	3:21
10.	"Círculos"	Di, Gee	Di, Gee	3:48
11.	"Tarde Demais"	Di, Fi, Yuri Nishida	Fi, Yuri Nishida	4:02
12.	"Uma Chance"	Daniel, Yuri Nishida	Fi, Yuri Nishida
13.	"Mentiras e Fracassos"	Fi	Gee, Yuri Nishida	3:12
14.	"Um Outro Caminho"	Di, Fi	Di, Gee, Yuri Nishida	3:09
Total length:				54:00

== Personnel ==
=== NX Zero ===
- Di Ferrero: lead vocals
- Gee Rocha: guitar, backing vocals
- Fi Ricardo: guitar
- Caco Grandino: bass
- Daniel Weksler: drums
