= É Preciso Saber Viver =

Single by Titãs

from the album Volume Dois
- Released: 1998
- Genre: Alternative rock
- Length: 4:08
- Label: WEA
- Songwriter(s): Roberto Carlos; Erasmo Carlos
- Producer(s): Liminha

Titãs singles chronology
"'Domingo'" (1995)	"É Preciso Saber Viver" (1998)	"'Pelados em Santos'" (1999)

"É Preciso Saber Viver" is the eleventh single by Titãs, released in 1998 from their album Volume Dois. It is a cover of a song written by Roberto Carlos, the best-selling musical artist in Brazil, and Erasmo Carlos. Extra vocals were provided by Brazilian band Fat Family. The song was featured in the 1998 Rede Globo telenovela remake Pecado Capital. When it was released, it was the most played song on radio stations in São Paulo, Florianópolis, Porto Alegre, Curitiba and Santos; the second most in Rio de Janeiro and Recife; and the third most Belo Horizonte. No Brasil em geral, foi a quarta.

== Music video ==
The music video of the song, directed by Conspiração Filmes, shows black & white images of the band performing in studio, and later alternate shots of the members taking a look at pictures of the group start to appear as well. Most of these pictures were printed on the Volume Dois booklet.
