= SNZ (group) =

Brazilian girl group

- Origin: Rio de Janeiro, Brazil
- Genres: Pop; dance-pop
- Years active: 1997–2009
- Labels: Warner
- Past members: Sarah Sheeva; Nãna Shara; Zabelê Gomes

SNZ was a Brazilian girl group formed in Rio de Janeiro in 1997 by sisters Sarah Sheeva, Nãna Shara and Zabelê Gomes, daughters of the musicians Baby do Brasil and Pepeu Gomes.

== Discography ==
- SNZ (2000)
- Sarahnãnazabelê (2001)
- Zunzum e Pronto (2007)
