= Canecão =

Indoor arena in Botafogo, Rio de Janeiro, Brazil

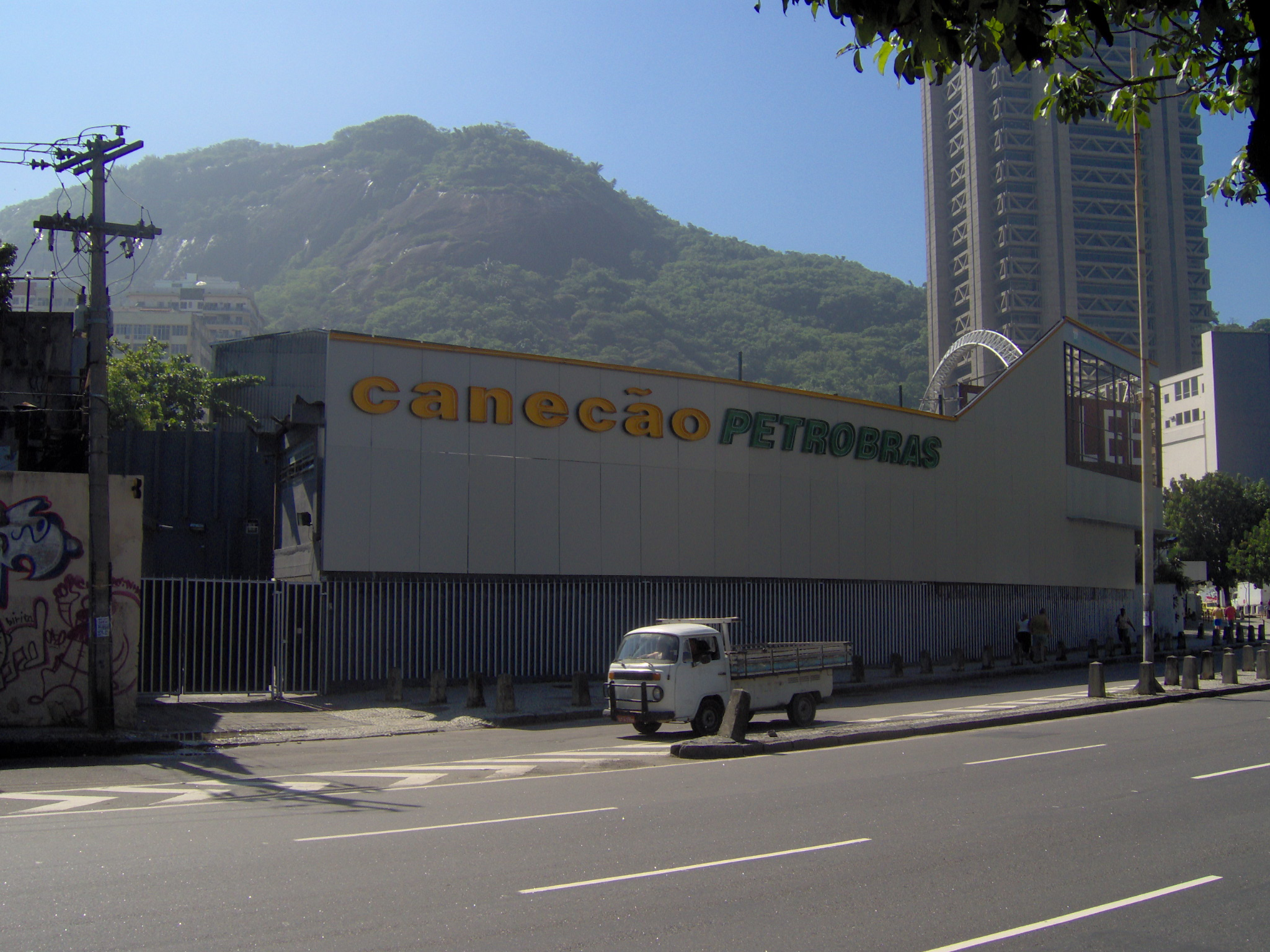
- Canecão in 2008

- Location within Brazil
- Location: Botafogo, Rio de Janeiro, Brazil
- Coordinates: 22°57′20.99″S 43°10′38.07″W
- Capacity: 2,000 (seated)
- Type: Music venue; indoor arena

Construction
- Opened: 1967
- Closed: 2010
- Demolished: 2019
- Years active: 1967-2010

The Canecão was an indoor arena located in Botafogo, Rio de Janeiro, Brazil. The venue opened in 1967 and was capable of functioning alternatively either as a dance floor or a concert hall (seating capacity: 2000). Prior to its demolition in 2019, it had been closed since 2010 due to legal quarrels over its ownership.

== History ==
During its more than four decades in use, the venue hosted a legion of notable artists, such as Pixinguinha, Tom Jobim, Elis Regina, Baden Powell de Aquino, Chico Buarque, Roberto Carlos, Wilson Simonal, Maysa, Marisa Monte, Ray Charles, Black Sabbath, Jethro Tull, The Ramones, MPB-4 and Quarteto em Cy.

On June 4, 2019, the Canecão was demolished as a result of an appeal by UFRJ to the Legislative Assembly of Rio de Janeiro (Alerj). The demolition was necessary in view of the need to regularize the use of the area and to continue the partnership with the BNDES, the project called VivaUFRJ, whose focus is to enhance the university's heritage.
