= Luan Santana =

Brazilian singer-songwriter (born 1991)

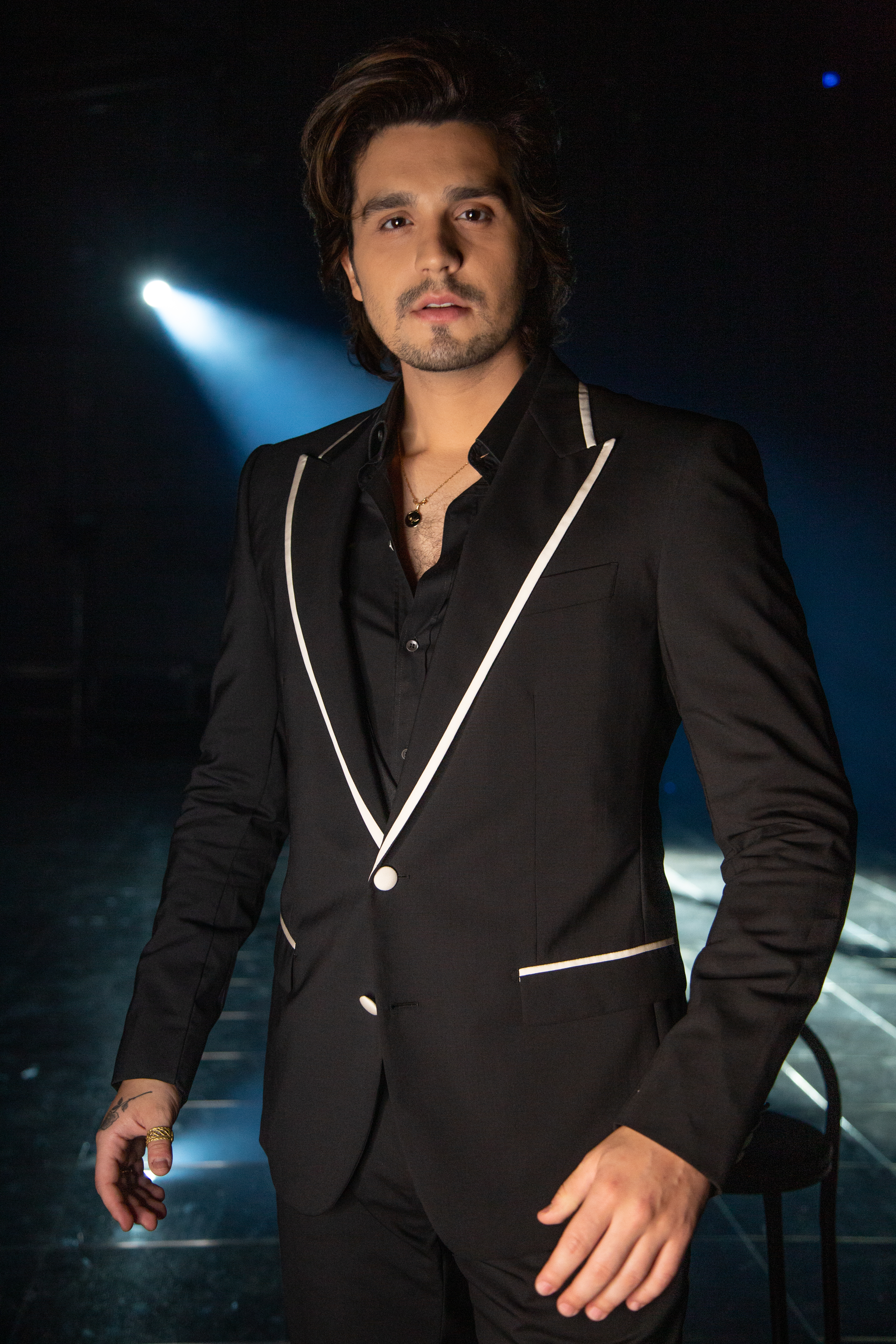
- Santana in 2020
- Born: Luan Rafael Domingos Santana; 13 March 1991 (age 35); Campo Grande, Mato Grosso do Sul, Brazil
- Occupations: Singer; songwriter
- Years active: 2007–present
- Spouse: Jade Magalhães (m. 2024)
- Musical career
- Genres: Sertanejo; pop
- Instruments: Vocals
- Label: Som Livre (2009–present)
- Website: www.luansantana.com.br

Luan Rafael Domingos Santana (Brazilian Portuguese pronunciation: [luˈɐ̃ ʁafaˈɛw doˈmĩɡus sɐ̃ˈtɐ̃nɐ]; born 13 March 1991) is a Brazilian singer-songwriter. His first live album was a bestseller throughout 2010, selling over 100,000 copies.

== Early life ==
Santana was born on March 13, 1991, in Campo Grande (MS). He first captured his family's eye at the age of three, singing Brazilian country music songs ('sertanejo' songs). He performed sertanejo standards such as Muda de vida, Chico Mineiro and Cabocla.

== Career ==
In 2009, Santana held 300 concerts in Brazil, featuring an average of 25 performances a month. In 2010, he was described as the "new phenomenon of sertanejo music" by Extra. Santana appeared at the 2010 Festa do Peão de Barretos, where he performed for a 50-thousand-people-audience. In 2014, he collaborated with Enrique Iglesias for the Brazilian version of "Bailando".

His album 1977 was nominated for the 2017 Latin Grammy Award for Best Sertaneja Music Album. In 2019, his album Live Móvel was nominated for the same category. In 2020, Crowley Broadcast Analysis ranked him as the most-played artist on Brazilian radio stations throughout the 2010s, with over 1 million total plays.

== Discography ==
=== Studio albums ===
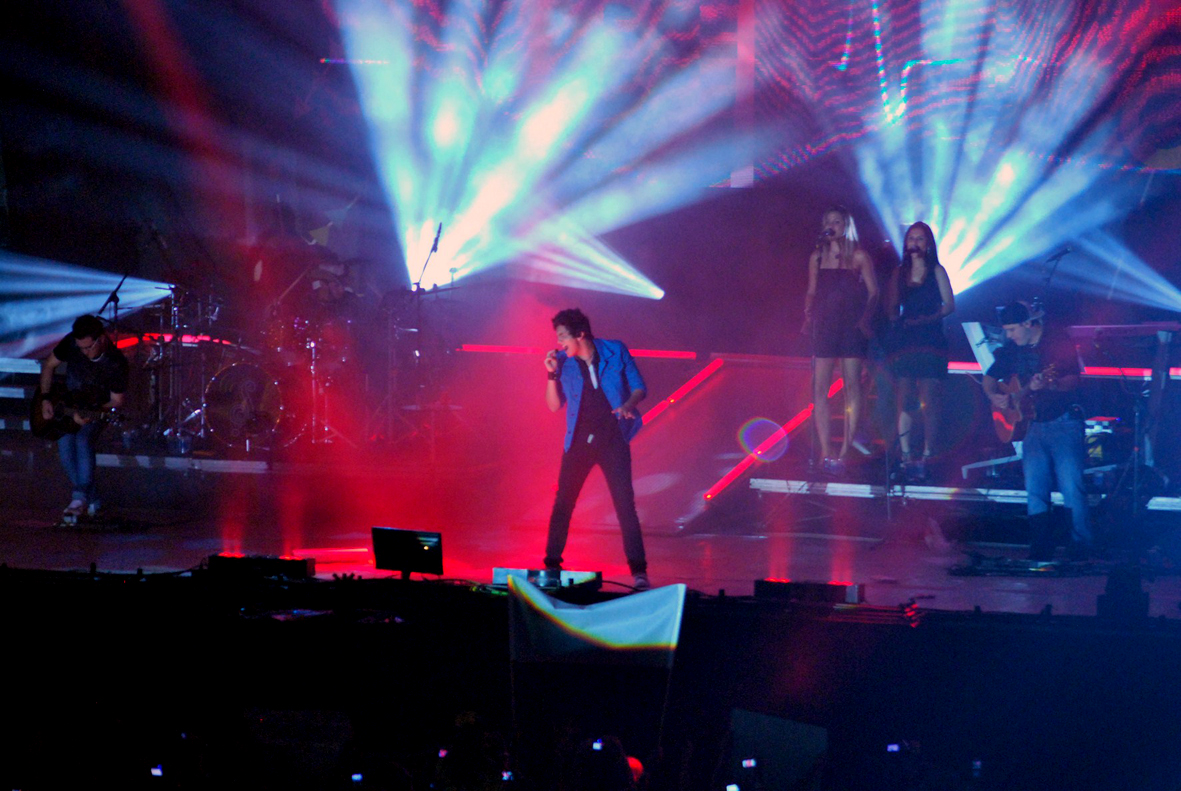
Luan Santana (2011)

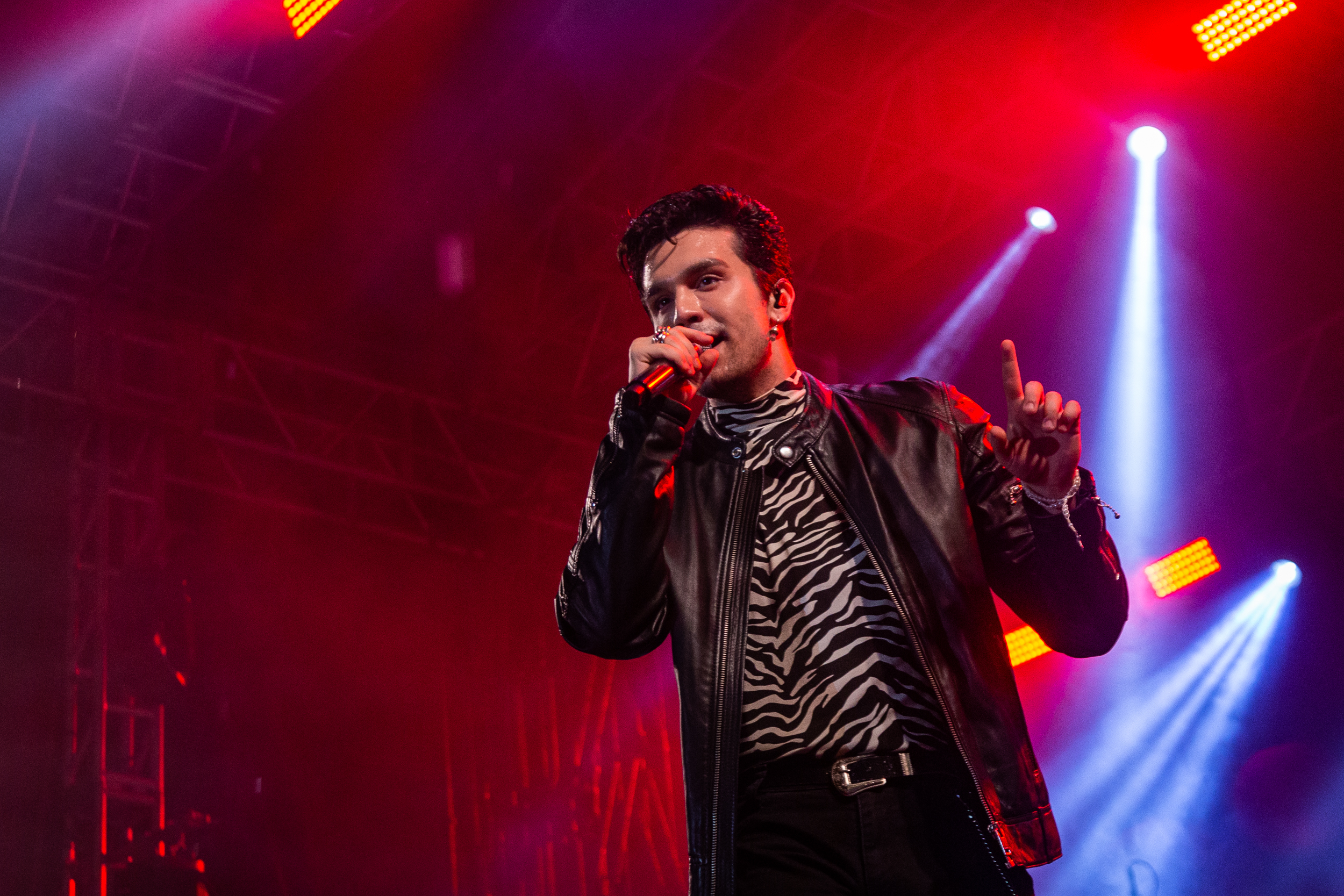
Luan Santana (2022)

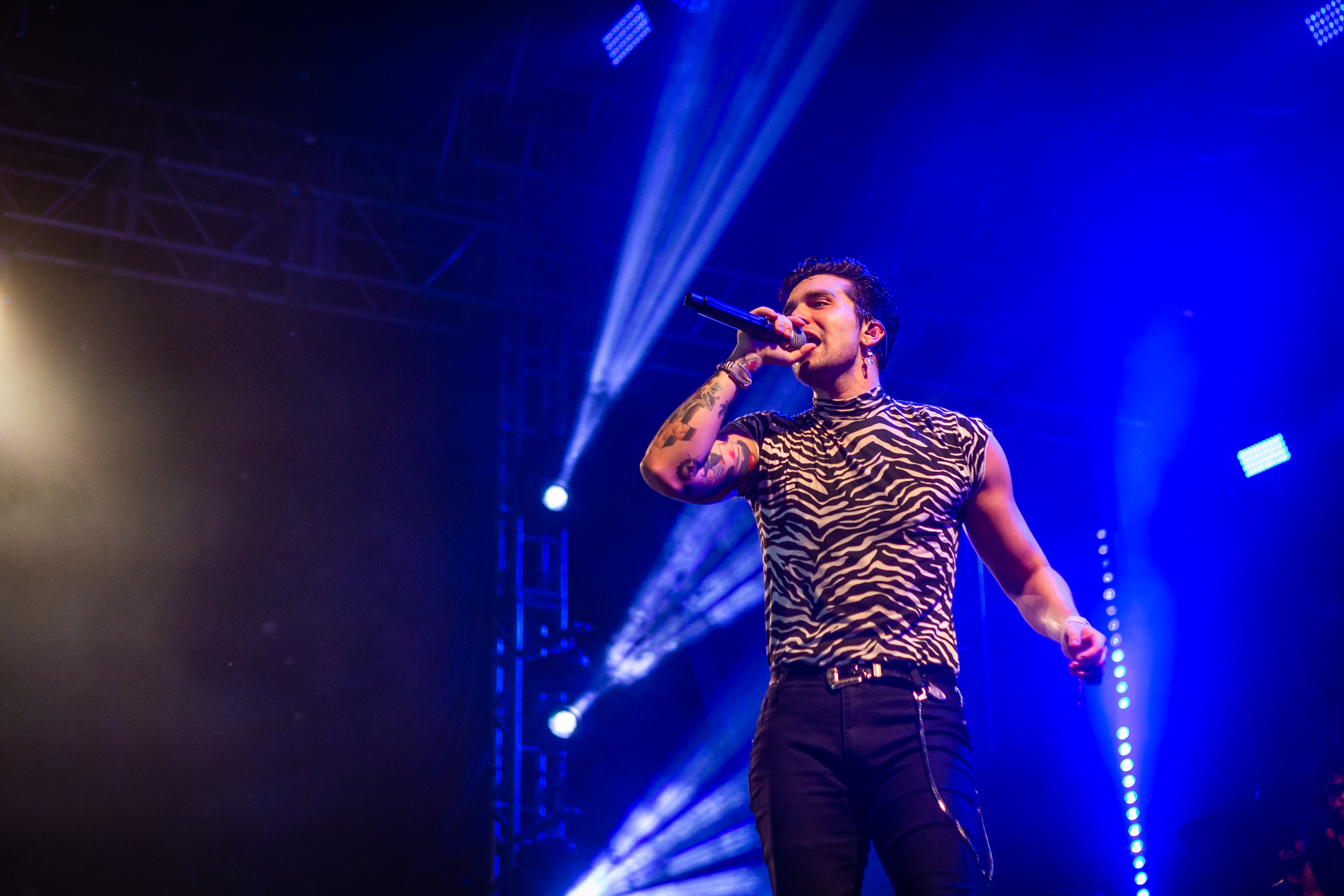
Luan Santana (2022)

Year	Details	Sales and certifications
2009	Tô de Cara: Released: February 1, 2009	Sales: 50,000
2012	Quando Chega a Noite: Released: April 9, 2012	Sales: 100,000

=== Live albums and video albums ===
Year	Details	Sales and certifications
2009	Ao Vivo: Released: November 24, 2009; Label: Som Livre; Formats: CD, DVD, download	Sales: 100,000; BRA: Platinum
2011	Ao Vivo no Rio: Released: April 10, 2011; Label: Som Livre; Formats: CD, DVD, download	Sales: 100,000; BRA: Platinum; POR: Gold
2013	O Nosso Tempo É Hoje: Released: October 21, 2013; Label: Som Livre; Formats: CD, DVD, download	Sales: 75,000; BRA: Platinum
2015	Acústico: Released: April 14, 2015; Label: Som Livre; Formats: CD, DVD, download	Sales: 30,000

=== Singles ===
- 2009: "Tô de Cara"
- 2009: "Meteoro"
- 2010: "Você não Sabe o que É Amor"
- 2010: "Sinais"
- 2010: "Adrenalina"
- 2011: "Química do Amor" (featuring Ivete Sangalo)
- 2011: "Um Beijo"
- 2011: "Amar Não é Pecado"
- 2011: "Nêga"
- 2012: "Você de Mim Não Sai"
- 2012: "Incondicional"
- 2012: "Te Vivo"
- 2013: "Sogrão Caprichou"
- 2013: "Te Esperando"
- 2013: "Garotas Não Merecem Chorar"
- 2013: "Tudo Que Você Quiser"
- 2014: "Cê Topa"
- 2014: "Tanto Faz"
- 2014: "Eu Não Merecia Isso"
- 2014: "Bailando" (Enrique Iglesias featuring Luan Santana, Descemer Bueno, Gente De Zona)
- 2015: "Escreve Aí"
- 2015: "Chuva de Arroz"
- 2016: "Eu, Você, O Mar e Ela"
- 2016: "Dia, Lugar e Hora"
- 2016: "RG"
- 2017: "Acordando o Prédio"
- 2017: Check-In
- 2018: "Mamita" (CNCO featuring Luan Santana)
- 2018: Próximo Amor (featuring DJ Alok)
- 2018: Sofázinho
- 2018: "2050"
- 2018: "Hasta La Vista"
- 2018: "Acertou a Mão″
- 2019 quando a bad bater
- 2020: "Inesquecível" (with Giulia Be)

=== Awards ===
Won	Indications
193	238

- 9 times as “Best Singer of The Year” for “Melhores do Ano” (The Best of the Year) for Globo Channel.
- Nominated 4 times for Latin Grammy All time winner of Nickelodeon Kids Choice Awards, Troféu Imprensa (Troféu Imprensa Awards) and Prêmio Jovem Brasileiro (Jovem Brasileiro Awards).

=== Highlights ===
- Today Luan Santana is the Brazilian artist with the most time on the American Billboard Social 50 chart, which places him as one of the most sought-after music names in the world on social networks.
- In December 2019, he was crowned ‘The most important Brazilian of the Year’ (‘Brasileiro do Ano’) from IstoÉ magazine.
- Over 52,000 fan clubs in Brazil.
- Among the 100 most followed and engaged artists in the world on social media with over 3.5 billion views on YouTube.
