= Multishow Brazilian Music Award for Song of the Year =

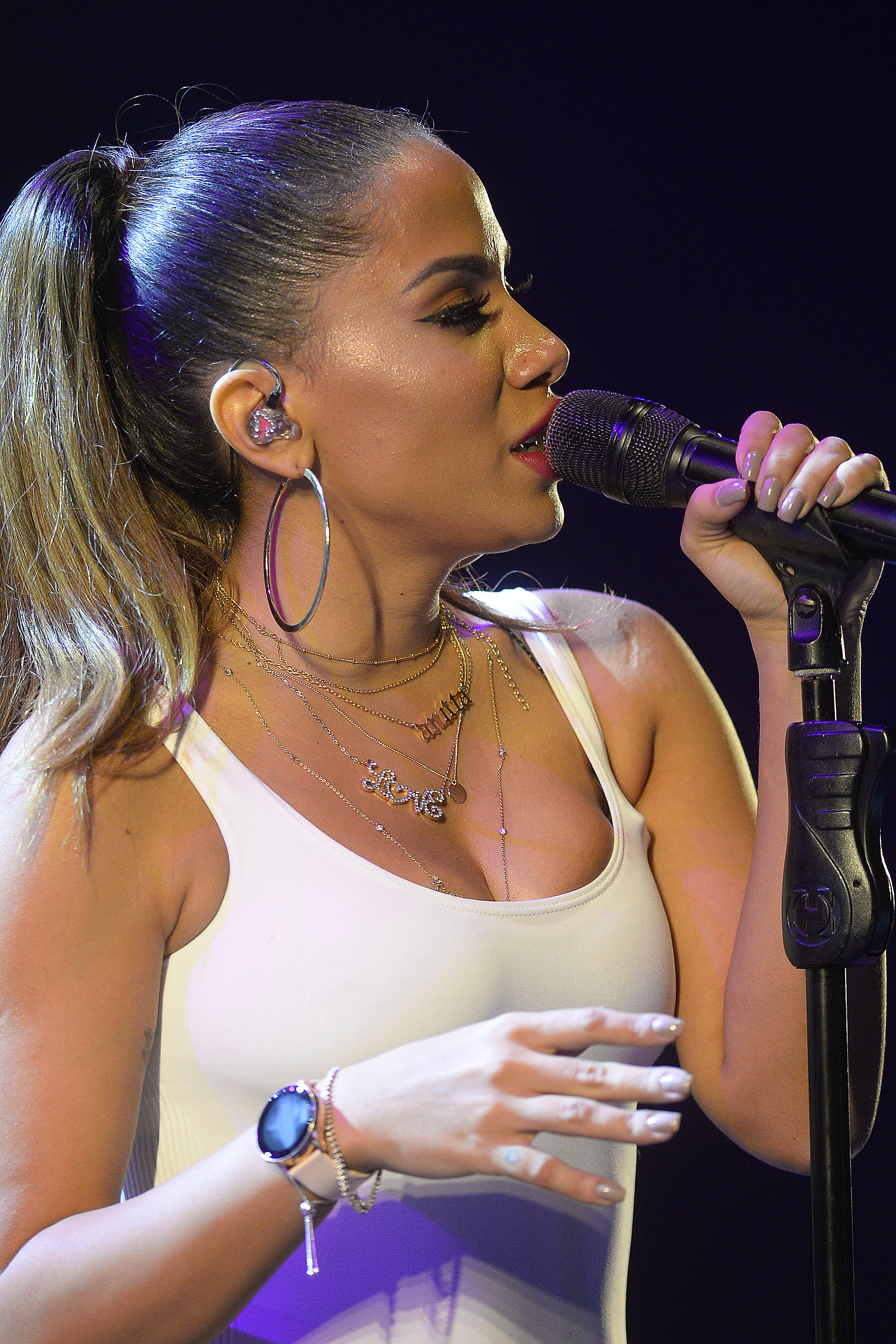
- Envolver by Anitta is the most recent recipient
- Country: Brazil
- Presented by: Multishow
- First award: 1998
- Currently held by: Anitta – Envolver (2023)

Highlights
- Most awards: Anitta (5)
- Website: Official website

The Multishow Brazilian Music Award for Song of the Year was an annual award given at the Multishow Brazilian Music Award, a ceremony established in 1994 and originally called the TVZ Award. It was first presented in the 1998 edition under the name Best Song. Anitta is the most awarded artist in this category, winning five times.

== Recipients ==
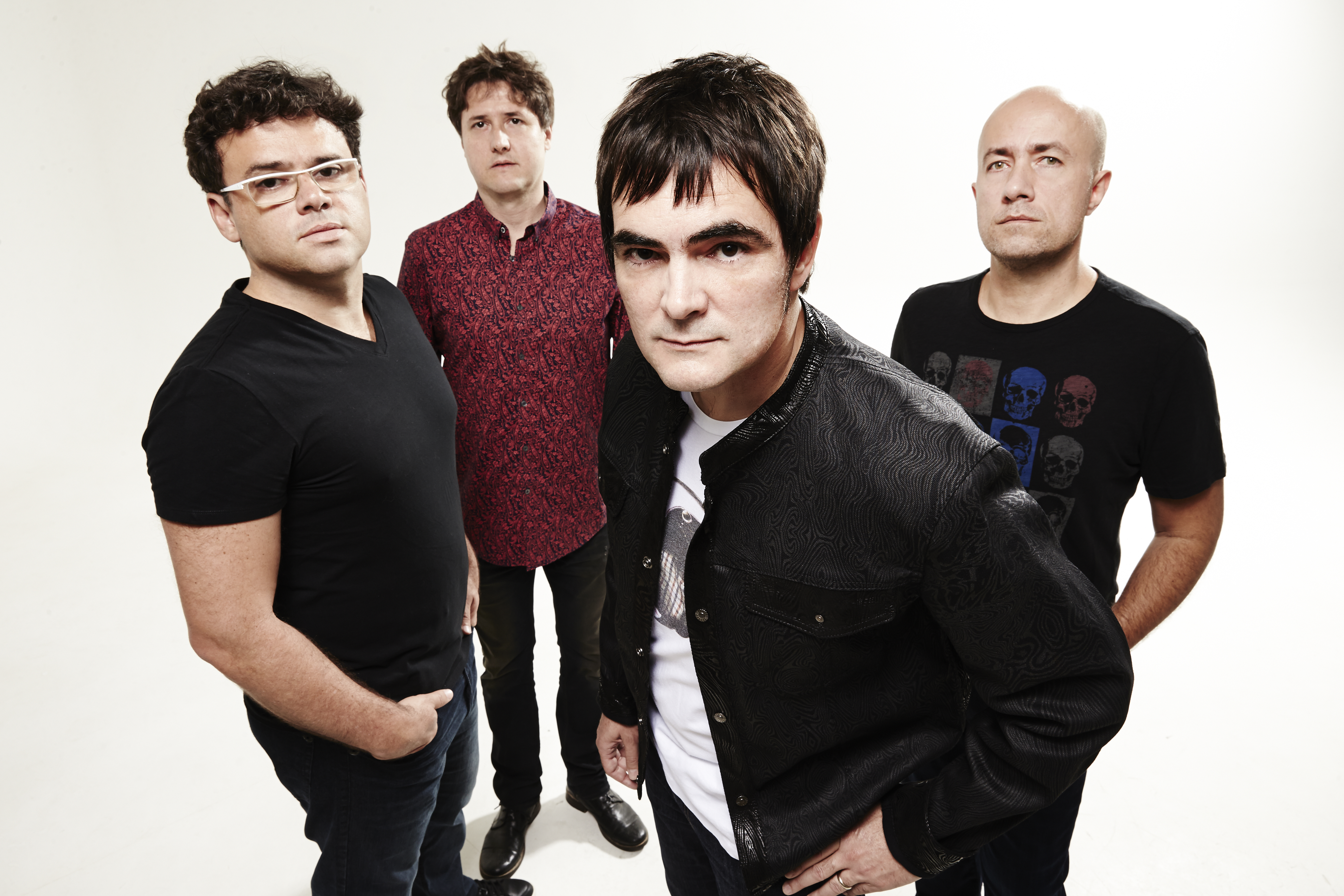
Skank won the award twice in a row: "Vou Deixar" (2004) and "Vamos Fugir" (2005).

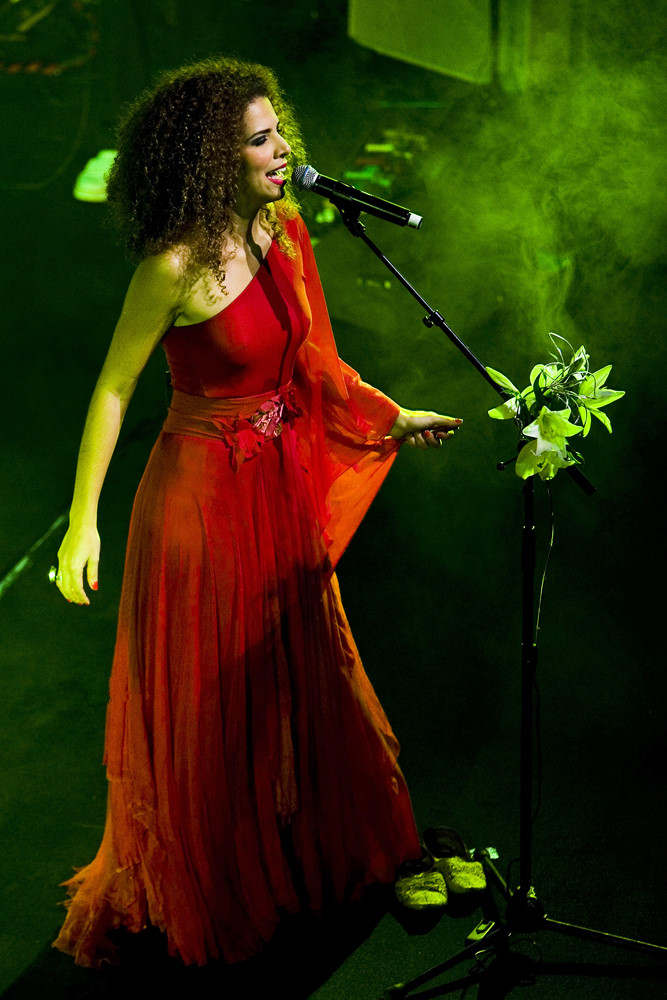
Vanessa da Mata won the award three times: "Ai, Ai, Ai..." (2006), "Boa Sorte / Good Luck" (2008) and "Amado" (2009).

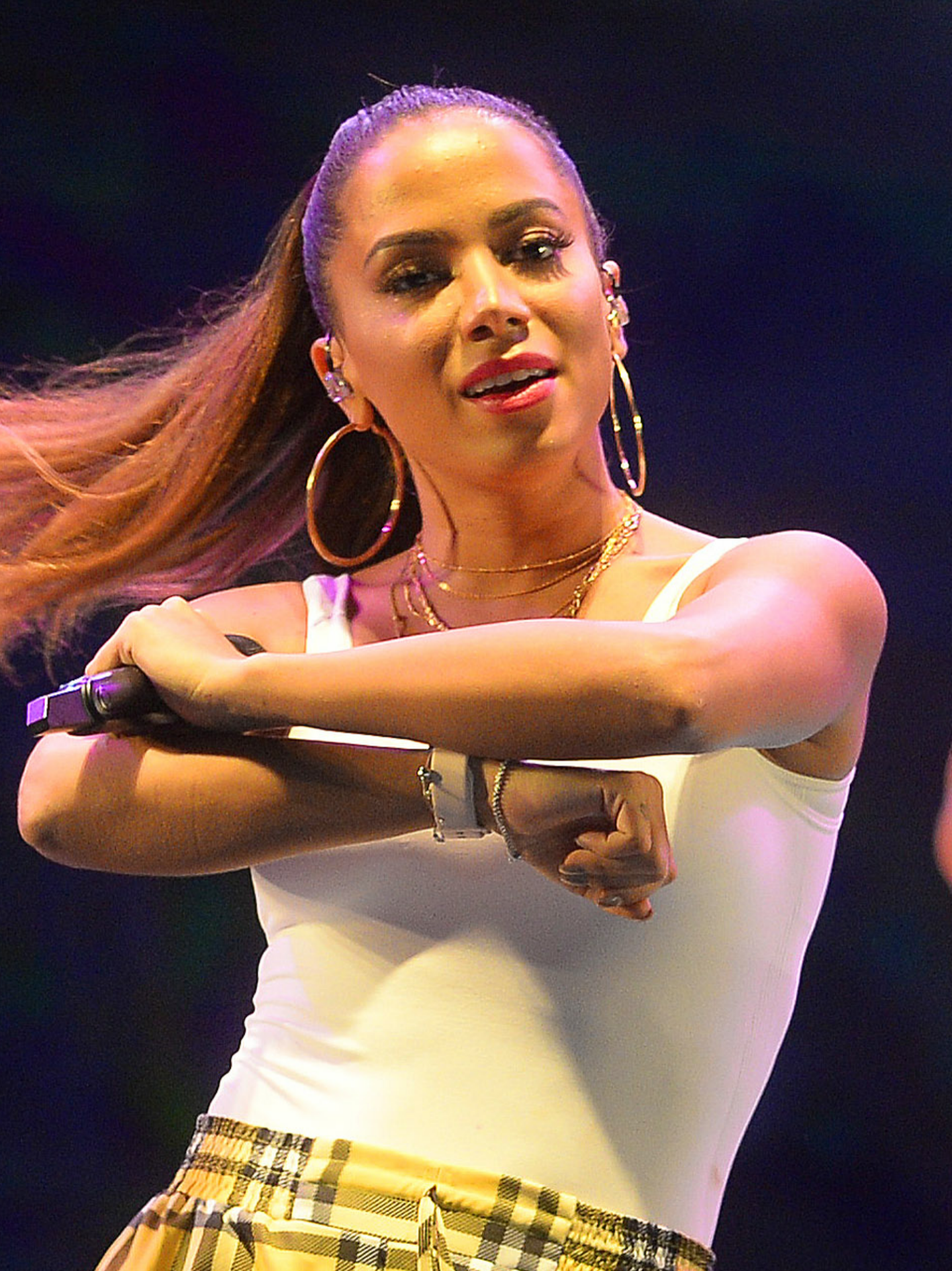
Anitta is the most awarded artist in the category, winning five times: "Ritmo Perfeito" (2015), "Blecaute" (2016), "Sim ou Não" (2017), "Girl from Rio" (2021) and "Envolver" (2022).

=== 1990s ===
Year	Winner(s)	Nominees	Ref.
1998	Vanessa Rangel – "Palpite"	Charlie Brown Jr. – "Proibida pra Mim"; Gabriel, o Pensador – "Cachimbo da Paz"; Titãs – "Os Cegos do Castelo"; Titãs – "Pra Dizer Adeus"	
1999	Titãs – "É Preciso Saber Viver"	Banda Eva – "Carro Velho"; Caetano Veloso – "Sozinho"; Jota Quest – "Fácil"; Skank – "Resposta"	

=== 2000s ===
Year	Winner(s)	Nominees	Ref.
2000	Los Hermanos – "Anna Júlia"	Chico Buarque – "Carioca"; Raimundos – "Deixa Eu Falar"; Raimundos – "Mulher de Fases"; Sandy & Junior – "Imortal"	
2001	Ivete Sangalo – "Se Eu Não Te Amasse Tanto Assim"	Adriana Calcanhotto – "Devolva-me"; Gilberto Gil – "Esperando na Janela"; Marisa Monte – "Amor I Love You"; Skank – "Balada do Amor Inabalável"	
2002	Daniela Mercury – "Mutante"	Ivete Sangalo – "Festa"; Leonardo – "Todas as Coisas do Mundo"; Marisa Monte – "A Sua"; Rita Lee – "Pra Você Eu Digo Sim"	
2003	Tribalistas – "Já Sei Namorar"	Jorge Vercillo – "Que Nem Maré"; Jota Quest – "Na Moral"; Leonardo – "Te Amo Demais"; LS Jack – "Carla"	
2004	Skank – "Vou Deixar"	Ivete Sangalo – "Sorte Grande"; Jota Quest – "Amor Maior"; Los Hermanos – "O Vencedor"; Maria Rita – "A Festa"	
2005	Skank – "Vamos Fugir"	Ana Carolina – "Encostar na Tua"; Capital Inicial – "Não Olhe pra Trás"; CPM 22 – "Ontem"; Pitty – "Equalize"	
2006	Vanessa da Mata – "Ai, Ai, Ai..."	Ana Carolina and Seu Jorge – "É Isso Aí"; CPM 22 – "Irreversível"; Jota Quest – "O Sol"; Los Hermanos – "O Vento"	
2007	Charlie Brown Jr. – "Senhor do Tempo"	Ivete Sangalo – "Berimbau Metalizado"; Negra Li – "Você Vai Estar na Minha"; Papas da Língua – "Eu Sei"; Pitty – "Na Sua Estante"	
2008	Vanessa da Mata e Ben Harper – "Boa Sorte / Good Luck"	Claudia Leitte – "Exttravasa"; Ivete Sangalo and Saulo Fernandes – "Não Precisa Mudar"; Maria Rita – "Tá Perdoado"; NX Zero – "Pela Última Vez"	
2009	Vanessa da Mata – "Amado"	Claudia Leitte – "Beijar na Boca"; Marcelo D2 – "Desabafo"; Marisa Monte – "Não é Proibido"; Skank and Negra Li – "Ainda Gosto Dela"	

=== 2010s ===
Year	Winner(s)	Nominees	Ref.
2010	Restart – "Recomeçar"	Luan Santana – "Meteoro"; Maria Gadú – "Shimbalaiê"; NX Zero – "Espero a Minha Vez"; Pitty – "Me Adora"	
2011	NX Zero – "Onde Estiver"	Luan Santana – "Adrenalina"; Luan Santana and Ivete Sangalo – "Química do Amor"; Michel Teló – "Fugidinha"; Victor & Leo – "Boa Sorte pra Você"	
2012	Ana Carolina – "Problemas"	Luan Santana – "Nêga"; Ivete Sangalo – "Darte"; Marisa Monte – "Depois"; Fiuk and Jorge Ben Jor – "Quero Toda Noite"	
2013	Thiaguinho – "Buquê de Flores"	Claudia Leitte – "Largadinho"; Luan Santana – "Te Vivo"; Ana Carolina – "Combustível"; Ivete Sangalo – "Dançando"	
2014	Luan Santana – "Tudo Que Você Quiser"	Anitta – "Zen"; Jota Quest – "Mandou Bem"; O Rappa – "Auto-Reverse"; Paula Fernandes – "Não Fui Eu"	
2015	Anitta – "Ritmo Perfeito"	Ana Carolina – "Coração Selvagem"; Jota Quest – "Dentro de um Abraço"; Luan Santana – "Escreve Aí"; Skank – "Esquecimento"	
2016	Jota Quest (featuring Anitta) – "Blecaute"	Luan Santana – "Chuva de Arroz"; Ludmilla – "24 Horas por Dia"; Nego do Borel – "Não Me Deixe Sozinho"	
2017	Anitta (featuring Maluma) – "Sim ou Não"	Gusttavo Lima – "Homem de Família"; Nego do Borel (featuring Wesley Safadão and Anitta) – "Você Partiu Meu Coração"; Matheus & Kauan – "O Nosso Santo Bateu"	
2018	Iza (featuring Marcelo Falcão) – "Pesadão"	Ivete Sangalo – "Cheguei pra Te Amar"; Luan Santana – "2050"; Marília Mendonça – "Ausência"; Simone & Simaria – "Regime Fechado"	
2019	Felipe Araújo (featuring Ferrugem) – "Atrasadinha"	Dilsinho – "Péssimo Negócio"; Gabriel Diniz – "Jenifer"; Iza – "Dona de Mim"; Marília Mendonça – "Todo Mundo Vai Sofrer"	

=== 2020s ===
Year	Winner(s)	Nominees	Ref.
2020	Ludmilla – "Verdinha"	Gusttavo Lima – "A Gente Fez Amor"; Henrique & Juliano – "Liberdade Provisória"; MC Zaac, Anitta and Tyga – "Desce pro Play (Pa, Pa, Pa)"; Vitor Kley and Samuel Rosa – "A Tal Canção pra Lua"	
2021	Anitta – "Girl from Rio"	Israel &amp; Rodolffo – "Batom de Cereja"; Iza – "Gueto"; Luan Santana – "Morena"; Marisa Monte – "Calma"	
2022	Anitta – "Envolver"	Gloria Groove – "Vermelho"; Iza – "Fé"; Jovem Dionisio – "Acorda Pedrinho"; L7nnon, Os Hawaianos and DJ Bel da CDD (featuring DJ Biel do Furduncinho) – "Desenrola Bate Joga de Ladin"; Ludmilla – "Maldivas"; Matuê, Teto and WIU – "Vampiro"; Xamã, Gustah and Neobeats – "Malvadão 3"	
