= Nelson Motta =

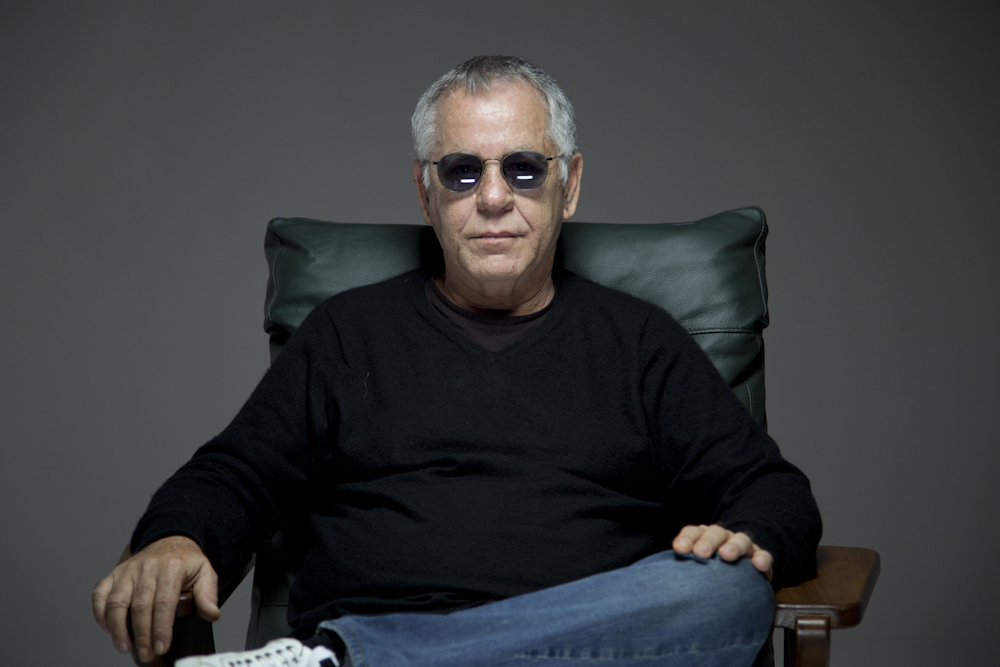

Background information
- Birth name: Nelson Cândido Motta Filho
- Born: October 29, 1944 (age 80); São Paulo, Brazil
- Genres: Brazilian rock, MPB
- Occupation(s): Songwriter, journalist, writer, and record producer
- Years active: 1964-present

Nelson Cândido Motta Filho (born 29 October 1944, São Paulo, Brazil) is a Brazilian journalist, ghostwriter, songwriter, writer, and record producer.

He was part of the bossa nova movement, collaborating with Edu Lobo, Dori Caymmi, Lulu Santos, Rita Lee, Djavan and others, and producer for several MPB artists, such as Elis Regina, Gal Costa, Daniela Mercury and others. He was Marisa Monte's first music producer in the late 1980s. Motta also produced early Brazilian rock shows and wrote lyrics in collaboration with rock artists, such as Lulu Santos.

He produced Riû, the third album of the Portuguese fado singer Cuca Roseta, released in 2015.
