= CPM 22 =

Brazilian hardcore band

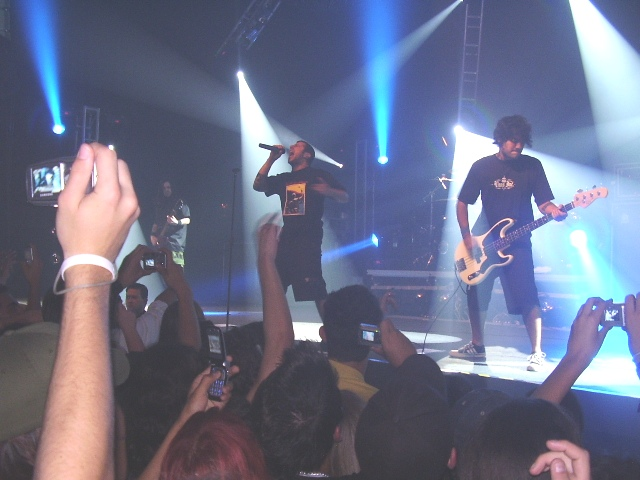

Background information
- Origin: São Paulo, Brazil
- Genres: Melodic hardcore; skate punk; pop punk; emocore
- Years active: 1995–present
- Labels: Abril, Arsenal, Sony BMG, Universal, Performance
- Members: Badauí; Luciano; Phil; Ali; Daniel
- Past members: Japinha; Portoga; Xixo; André; Wally; Santiago; Fernando; Heitor
- Website: Official Website

CPM 22 ([se pe ˈẽmi ˈvĩt͡ʃ(i) dojs]) is a Brazilian hardcore band from São Paulo formed in 1995. Band members are Badauí (vocals), Luciano (guitar), Phil (guitar), Ali (bass), and Daniel (drums).

== History ==
With influences from the Ramones, Lagwagon, Misfits, Descendents, Millencolin, Alkaline Trio, Screeching Weasel, NOFX, Buzzcocks, Face to Face, Pennywise, Green Day, and other old=school punk and hardcore legends, CPM 22 recorded their first demo tape in 1998.

Their popularity in the Brazilian underground scene led CPM 22 to record the independent album A Alguns Quilômetros de Lugar Algum (A Few Kilometers From Nowhere). Two years later they were included in the Brazilian MTV video-music award in the demo clip category with "Anteontem" (The Day Before Yesterday).

In 2001, they signed with Abril Music and released their first mainstream album simply called CPM 22 with many hits, including "Regina, Let's Go", "Tarde de Outubro" (October Afternoon) and "O Mundo Dá Voltas" (The World Turns), playing on Brazilian radios.

At the end of 2002, they released Chegou a Hora de Recomeçar (Now's The Time To Start Over). CPM 22 reached the top of their popularity in Brazil with songs including "Desconfio" (I Suspect), "Ontem" (Yesterday), "Não Sei Viver Sem Ter Você" (I Don't Know How to Live Without You), "Dias Atrás" (Days Ago), and "Atordoado" (Stunned).

On 13 July 2022, World Rock Day, the band released the song "Tudo Vale a Pena?" (Is Everything Worth It?), co-composed and co-written by Sérgio Britto, vocalist and keyboardist of Titãs. The track was produced by members Luciano, Philippe and Ali.

In 2024, the band released the album Enfrente, featuring singles such as "Mágoas Passadas" and "Alívio Imediato". CPM 22 kept aligned with its roots, bringing influences from pop punk and melodic hardcore, music genres the band has always been associated with.

== Discography ==
=== Studio albums ===
- (2000) A Alguns Quilômetros de Lugar Nenhum
- (2001) CPM 22
- (2002) Chegou a Hora de Recomeçar
- (2005) Felicidade Instantânea
- (2007) Cidade Cinza
- (2011) Depois de um Longo Inverno
- (2017) Suor e Sacrifício
- (2024) Enfrente

=== Live albums ===
- (2006) MTV ao Vivo
- (2013) Acústico
- (2016) Ao Vivo no Rock in Rio

=== Demo albums ===
- (1996) Como por Moral
- (1998) CPM 22

=== Singles ===
Year	Original títle	English translation	Album
2000	"Anteontem"	Day Before Yesterday	A Alguns Quilômetros de Lugar Nenhum
2001	"Regina Let's Go"		CPM 22
2001	"Tarde de Outubro"	October Afternoon	CPM 22
2002	"O Mundo Dá Voltas"	The World Turns Around	CPM 22
2002	"Desconfio"	I Suspect	Chegou a Hora de Recomeçar
2003	"Dias Atrás"	Days Ago	Chegou a Hora de Recomeçar
2003	"Não Sei Viver Sem Ter Você"	I Don't Know How to Live Without You	Chegou a Hora de Recomeçar
2004	"Ontem"	Yesterday	Chegou a Hora de Recomeçar
2005	"Um Minuto para o Fim do Mundo"	One Minute to the End Of The World	Felicidade Instantânea
2005	"Irreversível"	Irreversible	Felicidade Instantânea
2006	"Apostas e Certezas"	Bets and Certainties	Felicidade Instantânea
2006	"Inevitável" (live)	Inevitable	MTV ao Vivo
2007	"Além de Nós" (live)	Beyond Us	MTV ao Vivo
2007	"Tarde de Outubro" (live)	October Afternoon	MTV ao Vivo
2007	"Nossa Música"	Our Music	Cidade Cinza
2008	"Escolhas, Provas e Promessas"	Choices, Trials and Promises	Cidade Cinza
2009	"Estranho no Espelho"	Stranger in the Mirror	Cidade Cinza
2010	"Vida ou Morte"	Life or Death	Depois de um Longo Inverno
2011	"Hospital do Sofredor"	Hospital of Suffering	Depois de um Longo Inverno
2011	"Na Medida Certa"	In the Right Measure	Depois de um Longo Inverno
2012	"Abominável"	Abominable	Depois de um Longo Inverno
2013	"CPM 22"		Depois de um Longo Inverno
2013	"Perdas"	Losses	Acústico
2014	"Pra Sempre"	Forever	Acústico
2017	"Ser Mais Simples"	Be More Simple	Suor e Sacrifício
2018	"Honrar Teu Nome"	Honor Your Name	Suor e Sacrifício
2018	"Faça Sua Parte" (feat. Raimundos)	Do Your Part	
2022	"Tudo Vale a Pena?"	Everything Is Worth It?	
2024	"Mágoas Passadas"	Past Sorrows	Enfrente
2024	"Alívio Imediato"	Immediate Relief	Enfrente

=== Promotional singles ===
- 2012: "Derrota e Glória"
