= Vanessa da Mata =

Brazilian singer, songwriter, and novelist

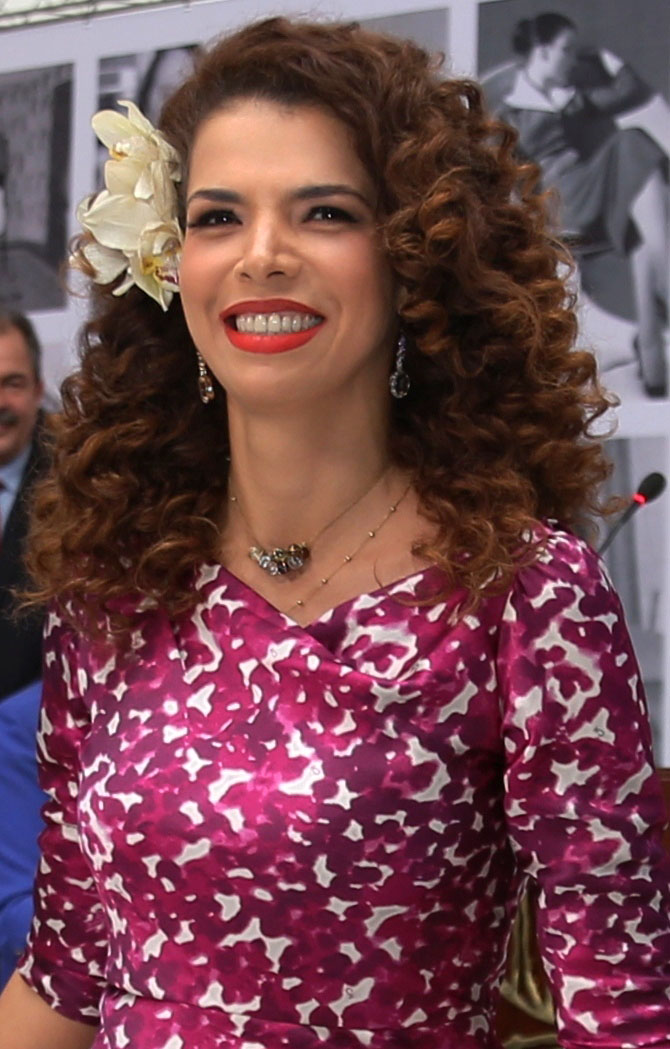
- Vanessa da Mata in 2014

Background information
- Born: Vanessa Sigiane da Mata Ferreira; February 10, 1976 (age 50); Alto Garças, Mato Grosso, Brazil
- Genres: MPB, samba, pop, R&B
- Occupation: Singer-songwriter
- Instrument: Vocals
- Years active: 2002–present
- Label: Sony
- Website: vanessadamata.com.br

Vanessa Sigiane da Mata Ferreira (born February 10, 1976), professionally known as Vanessa da Mata, is a Latin Grammy Award-winning Brazilian MPB singer, songwriter, and novelist. She has released four studio albums and the songs "Ai, Ai, Ai", "Boa Sorte/Good Luck" and "Amado" became number-one hits in Brazil.

== Biography ==
Vanessa Sigiane da Mata Ferreira was born on February 10, 1976, in Alto Garças, a small town in Mato Grosso located 399 km (248 miles) from state capital Cuiabá. Her article in the Portuguese Wikipedia stated that she has Xavante ancestry through her maternal grandmother. Vanessa has denied these claims, but said that her grandmother has indeed Native Brazilian ancestry, although she "can't identify from which tribe".

An autodidact in music, Vanessa listened to very different genres in her childhood; from Luiz Gonzaga to Tom Jobim, and from Milton Nascimento to Orlando Silva. She would also listen to regional music like carimbó through the records brought by an uncle who travelled to the Amazon. She was also familiar with samba, sertaneja music, and even brega Italian music, which were available to her through a local AM radio station. In several interviews, she cites deceased samba singer Clara Nunes as an influential figure in her compositions and image.

At age 14, Vanessa moved alone to Uberlândia, Minas Gerais, 1,199 km (745 miles) away from Alto Garças, to prepare for her vestibular exam, through which she intended to join a Medical school. There, she discovered that her real passion was singing, and by the following year was already performing in local clubs.

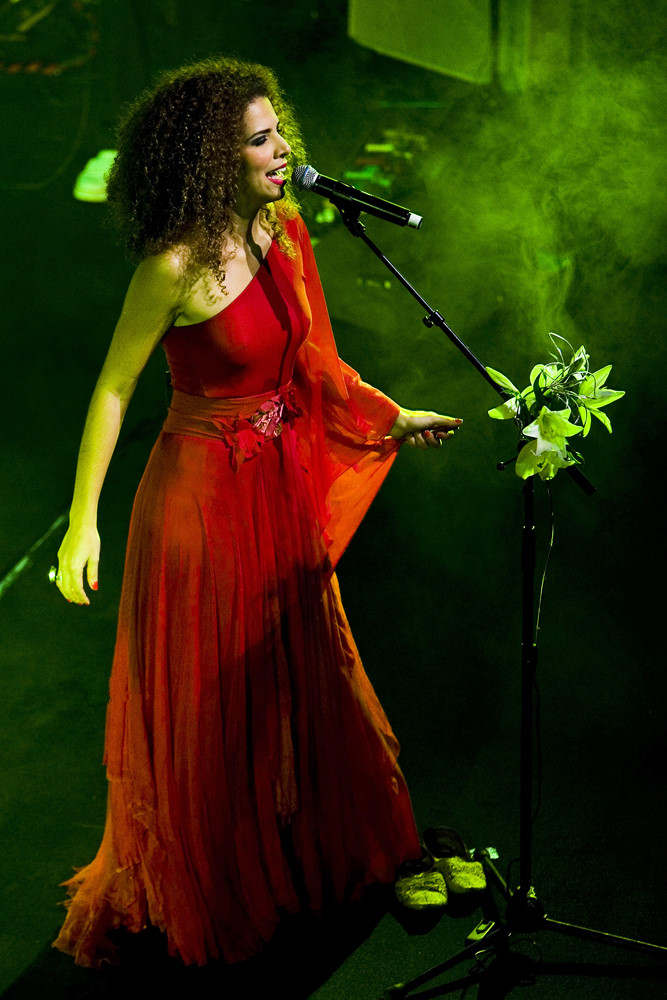
Vanessa da Mata 2007 at the Coliseu of Lisbon

In 1992, at age 16, Vanessa moved to São Paulo, where she started performing with Shalla-Ball, a female reggae band. Three years later, she toured Brazil with the Jamaican band Black Uhuru, for which she served as a backing vocal. She then became a part of regional rhythms band Mafuá. She also had careers as a professional model and basketball player around that time.

In 1997, Vanessa met singer-songwriter, Chico César and wrote the song "A Força que Nunca Seca" with him. It was later recorded by Maria Bethânia in her 1999 album of the same title. The song was nominated for a Latin Grammy Award and later re-recorded by César in his album Mama Mundi. Vanessa then became a renowned songwriter. She wrote "O Canto de Dona Sinhá" for Bethânia and Caetano Veloso and "Viagem" for Daniela Mercury. She also wrote the song "Me Sento na Rua" with Ana Carolina. She started performing as backing vocal in concerts of artists such as Milton Nascimento, Bethânia and the late Baden Powell.

In 2002, Vanessa released her eponymous first album through Sony Music. The album's biggest hit was the song "Não Me Deixe Só", which reached a peak position of 25th in the Brazilian chart and 42nd in the Portuguese. Two other songs from the album, "Nossa Canção" and "Onde Ir", both included in the soundtrack albums of two Rede Globo telenovelas, became minor hits, reaching peak positions of 40th and 69th in the Brazilian chart, respectively.

In 2004, Vanessa released her second album, titled Essa Boneca Tem Manual. The album produced the singer's first number-one hit in Brazil, the song "Ai, Ai, Ai", which also peaked at 13th in the Sweden chart. Other hits include a remix version of the same song, which reached the 3rd position in the Brazilian chart and "Ainda Bem", which reached the 21st position.

On May 28, 2007, Vanessa released her third album, titled Sim. The two singles released from the album, "Boa Sorte/Good Luck", a duet with American singer Ben Harper, and "Amado", both became number-one hits in Brazil. "Boa Sorte/Good Luck" also became a number-one single in Portugal. She received her first Latin Grammy Award, in the category of Best Contemporary Brazilian Pop Album, for the album.

In May 2009, Vanessa released her first live album and DVD to commemorate her six years of career. The CD and DVD Multishow ao Vivo – Vanessa da Mata was recorded in partnership with cable television channel Multishow. The first single from the album is "Vermelho", a live version of a track from the previous album.

In October 2010 Vanessa da Mata released the CD Bicicletas, Bolos e Outras Alegrias, from which the song, "O Tal Casal" was pre-released as a single.

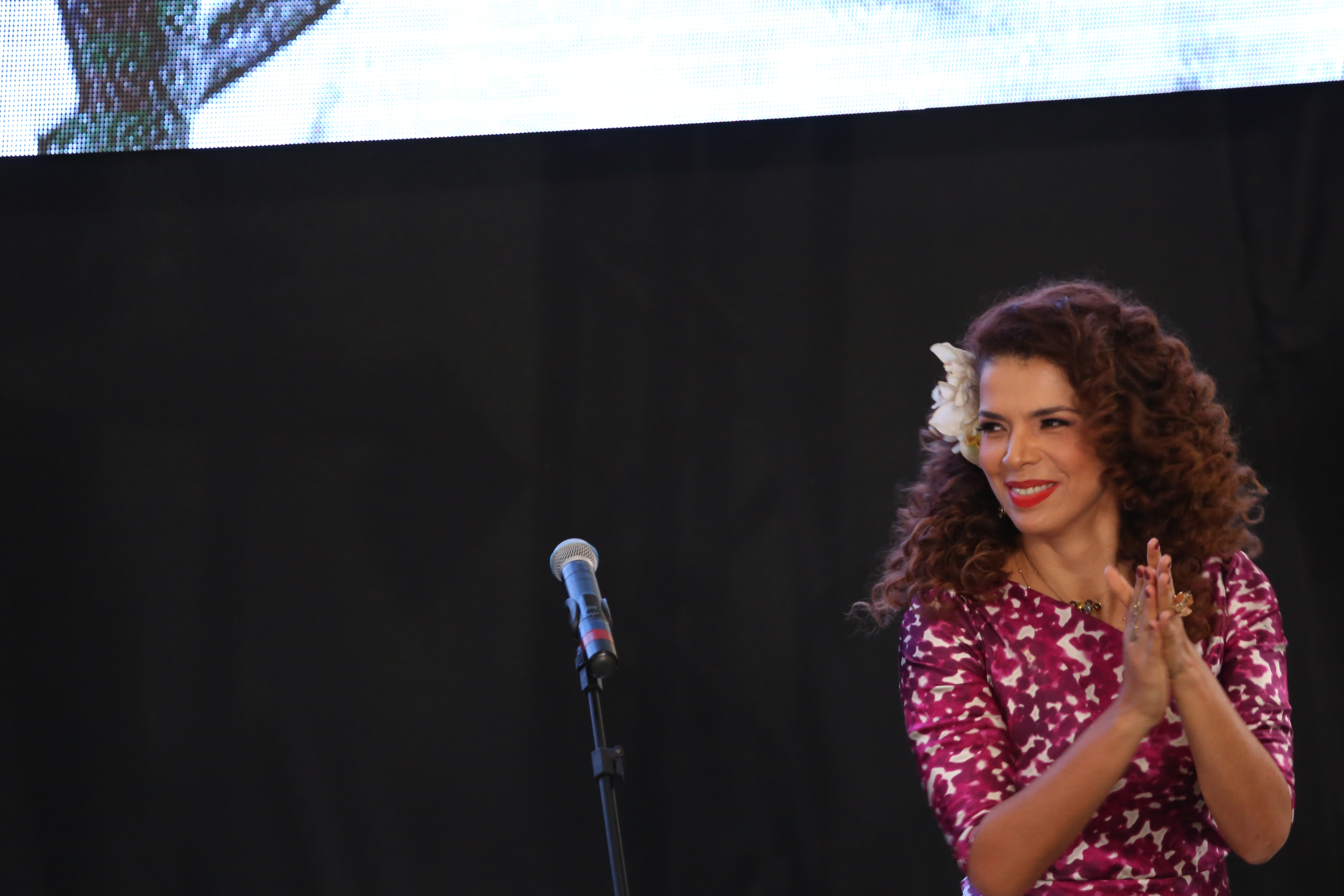
Vanessa da Mata during ceremony of the Ordem do Mérito Cultural, in Brasília (2014)

In 2011, she collaborated with Seu Jorge and Almaz on the song "Boa Reza" for the Red Hot Organization's charitable album Red Hot + Rio 2. Proceeds from the sales were donated to raise awareness and money to fight HIV/AIDS and related health and social issues.

From April to June 2013, Vanessa da Mata collaborated with and was sponsored by cosmetics brand Nivea to produce a series of free concerts, presented throughout various large Brazilian cities. These featured the music and songs of renowned Brazilian singer and composer Tom Jobim, and had the purpose of raising awareness and appreciation of his work and cultural importance in Brazil. Da Mata continued the tour after the sponsorship ended, due to the popularity of the concerts. On July 1, 2013, she released the album Vanessa Da Mata canta Tom Jobim, a compilation of the work presented in the concerts.

Up until early 2013, Da Mata was married to Brazilian actor and photographer Geraldo Pestalozzi, with whom she adopted three children. They separated on amiable terms.

Her first novel "A Filha das Flores" was released in Brazil on the October 18, 2013.

== Discography ==
=== Albums ===
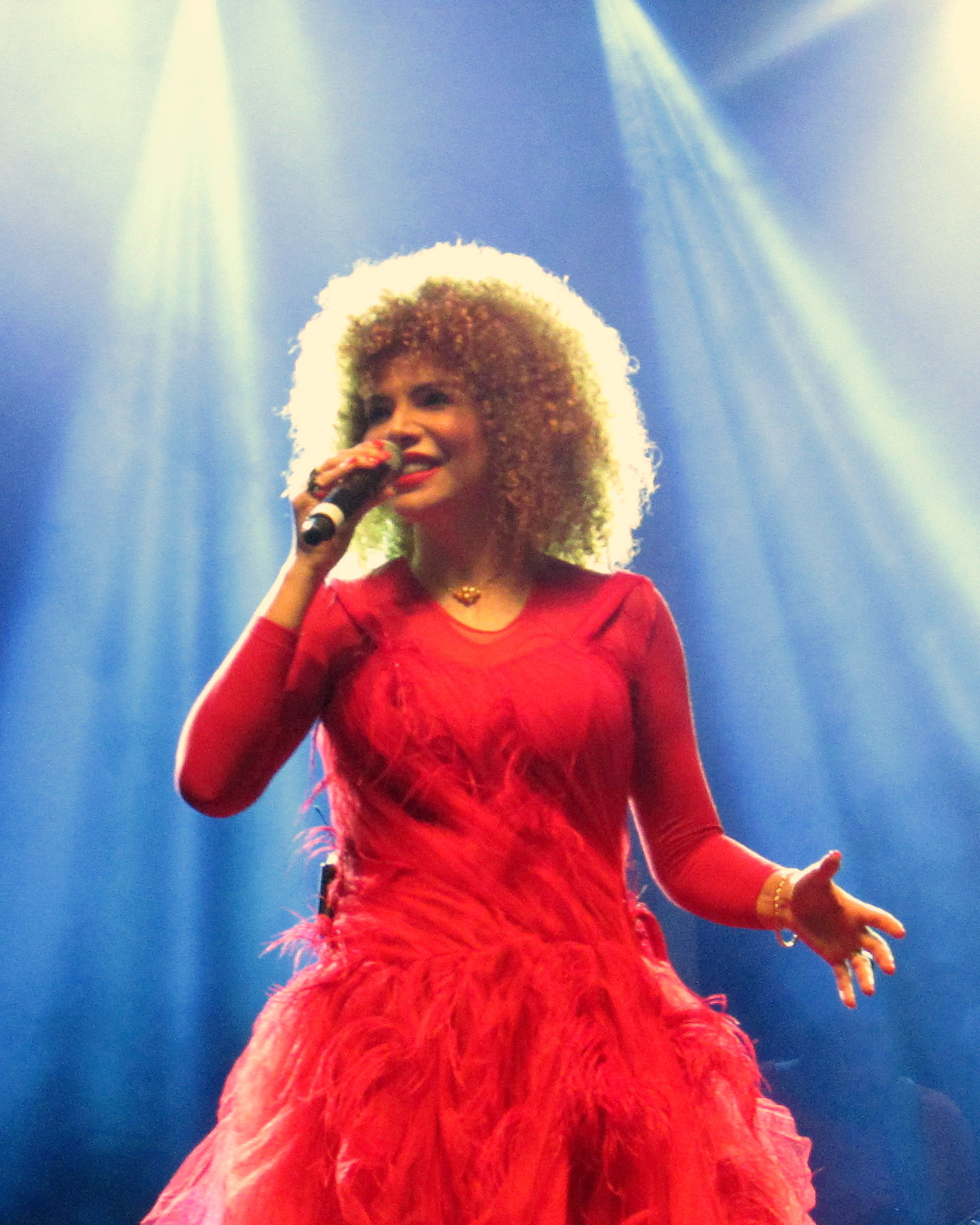
Vanessa da Mata (2022)

- 2002: Vanessa da Mata
- 2004: Essa Boneca Tem Manual
- 2007: Sim
- 2009: Multishow ao Vivo: Vanessa da Mata (live)
- 2010: Bicicletas, Bolos e Outras Alegrias
- 2013: Vanessa da Mata canta Tom Jobim
- 2014: Segue o som
- 2019: Quando Deixamos Nossos Beijos Na Esquina

=== EPs ===
- 2007: Sim

=== DVDs ===
- 2009: Multishow ao Vivo – Vanessa da Mata

=== Soundtracks ===
==== Telenovelas ====
- Cama de Gato (Rede Globo, 2010) – "Um Dia, Um Adeus"
- A Favorita (Rede Globo, 2008) – "Amado"
- Pé na jaca (Rede Globo, 2006) – "Ainda Bem"
- Belíssima (Rede Globo, 2005) – "Ai, Ai, Ai"
- A Lua me Disse (Rede Globo, 2005) – "Eu Sou Neguinha"
- Celebridade (Rede Globo, 2003) – "Nossa canção"
- Esperança (Rede Globo, 2002) – "Onde ir"

==== Films ====
- Muito Gelo e Dois Dedos D'Água (2006) – "Música"
- Garoto Cósmico (2007)

== Songs recorded by other artists ==
- "A Força que Nunca Seca" – Maria Bethânia (A Força que Nunca Seca, 1999)
- "Viagem" – Daniela Mercury (Sol da Liberdade, 2000)
- "Me Sento na Rua" – Ana Carolina (Ana Rita Joana Iracema e Carolina, 2001)
- "O Canto de Dona Sinhá" – Maria Bethânia (Maricotinha, 2001 e Maricotinha Ao Vivo, 2002)

== Awards ==
Multishow Brazilian Music Award

- 2009: Best Song – "Amado"
- 2008: Best Song – "Boa Sorte/Good Luck" (shared with Ben Harper)
- 2006: Best Song – "Ai, Ai, Ai"

Latin Grammy Award

- 2008: Best Brazilian Contemporary Pop Album – Sim
- 2014: Best Brazilian Song – "Segue o Som" (nominated)
