= NX Zero =

Brazilian rock band

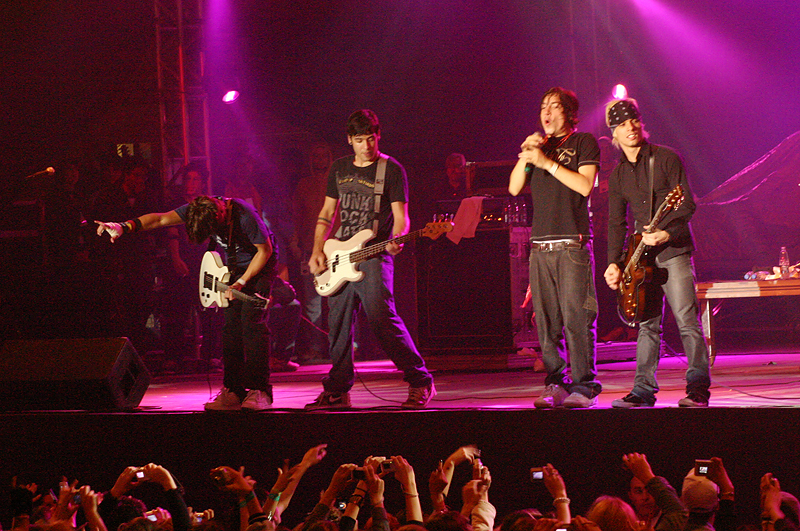
- NX Zero in 2007

Background information
- Origin: São Paulo, Brazil
- Genres: Alternative rock; emo; melodic hardcore
- Years active: 2001–2017 (touring 2023)
- Labels: Universal, Deck
- Members: Di Ferrero; Gee Rocha; Fi Ricardo; Caco Grandino; Dani Weksler
- Past members: Philip Peep; Yuri Nishida
- Website: nxzero.com.br

NX Zero was a Brazilian rock band formed in 2001 in São Paulo, the band last line-up consisted of vocalist Di Ferrero, lead guitarist Gee Rocha, rhythm guitarist Fi Ricardo, bassist Caco Grandino, and drummer Dani Weksler.

The band released their debut album through Urubuz Records, Diálogo? (2004). After this album, the band signed with Universal Music and released six more albums: NX Zero (2006), Agora (2008), Sete Chaves (2009), Projeto Paralelo (2010), Multishow ao Vivo: NX Zero 10 Anos (2011) and Em Comum (2012). According to ABPD the Band has won two singles Disk Diamond, "Incontrolável" and "Consequência", "Cedo Ou Tarde" with platinum and "Razões e Emoções" with platinum, with a total of more than a 100 thousand downloads paid only in Brazil.

NX Zero was in ninth place in the top 50 best selling CDs in Brazil. The debut sold more than 145,000 copies and the DVD 62 Mil Horas Até Aqui, about 43,000. They received a proposal to rewrite their songs in other languages. They released songs in English and Spanish.

== Band members ==
=== Last line-up ===
- Daniel Weksler – drums (2001–2017; touring 2023)
- Fi Ricardo – rhythm guitar (2003–2017; touring 2023), lead guitar (2004–2006)
- Di Ferrero – lead vocals (2004–2017; touring 2023)
- Caco Grandino – bass (2006–2017; touring 2023)
- Gee Rocha – lead guitar (2006–2017; touring 2023), backing vocals (2003–2017; touring 2023), bass (2003–2006)

=== Former members ===
- Phillip Peep – lead vocals, bass (2001–2003)
- Yuri Nishida – lead guitar (2001–2004), lead vocals (2003–2004); rhythm guitar, backing vocals (2001–2003)

== Discography ==
=== Studio albums ===
- (2004) Diálogo?
- (2006) NX Zero
- (2008) Agora
- (2009) Sete Chaves
- (2012) Em Comum
- (2015) Norte

=== Live/video albums ===
- (2007) MTV ao Vivo: 5 Bandas de Rock (with Forfun, Fresno, Hateen and Moptop)
- (2008) 62 Mil Horas Até Aqui
- (2011) Multishow ao Vivo: NX Zero 10 Anos
- (2017) Norte (Ao Vivo)
- (2024) Tour Cedo ou Tarde (Ao Vivo)

=== Remix albums ===
- (2010) Projeto Paralelo

=== Extended plays ===
- (2014) Estamos no Começo de Algo Muito Bom, Não Precisa Ter Nome Não
