= Multishow Brazilian Music Award for Show of the Year =

Brazilian music industry award

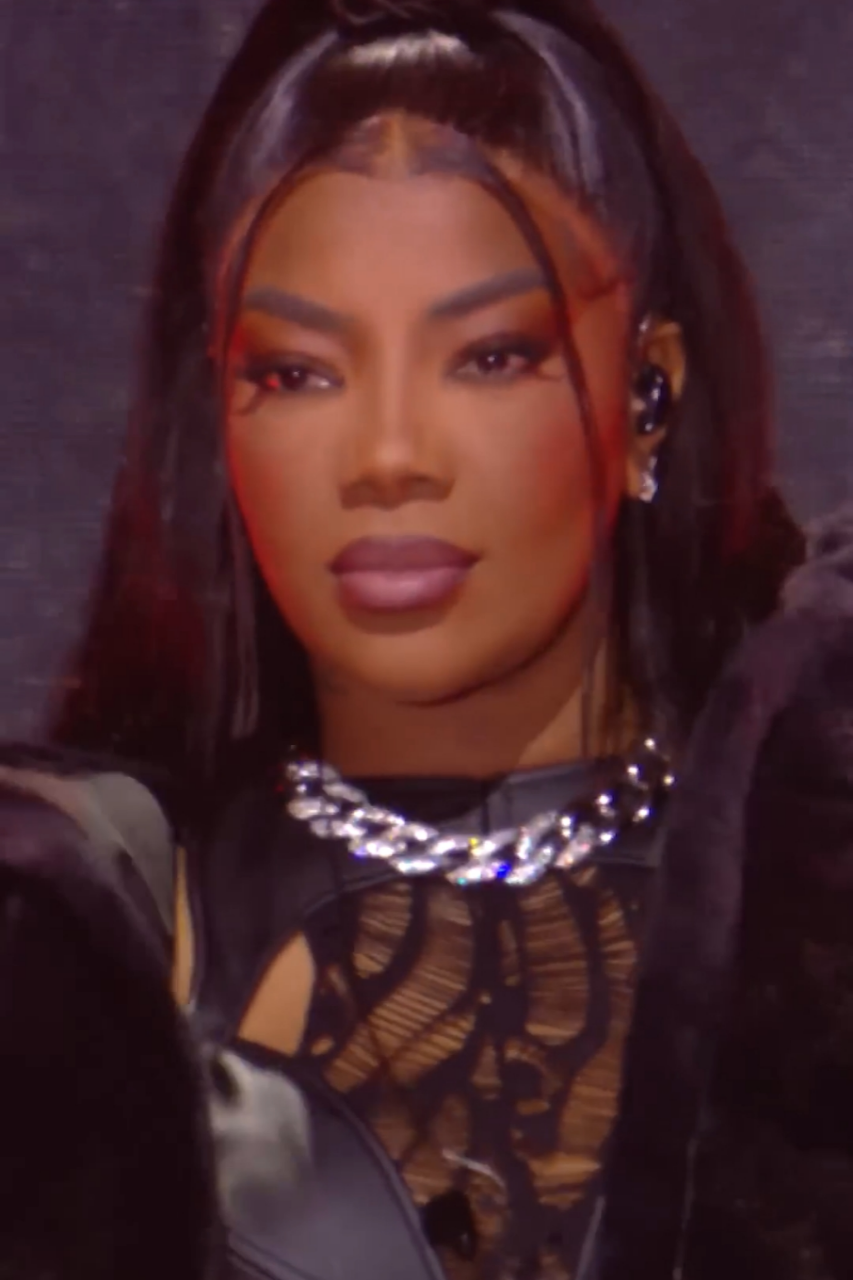
- Most recent winner: Ludmilla
- Country: Brazil
- Presented by: Multishow
- First award: 1998
- Currently held by: Numanice 2023 – Ludmilla (2023)

Highlights
- Most awards: Ivete Sangalo (5)
- Website: Official website

Multishow Brazilian Music Award for Show of the Year is an annual award presented at the Multishow Brazilian Music Award, a ceremony established in 1994 and originally called the TVZ Award. The award for Show of the Year was first introduced as Best Show in 1998. Between the 2020 and 2021 editions, the category was renamed twice: Live of the Year and Performance of the Year. In 2022, it was renamed Show of the Year.

== Recipients ==
=== 1990s ===
Year	Winner(s)	Nominees	Ref.
1998	Titãs	Amigos; Banda Eva; Gal Costa; Netinho	
1999	Terra Samba	Jota Quest; Os Paralamas do Sucesso; Skank; Titãs	

=== 2000s ===
Year	Winner(s)	Nominees	Ref.
2000	Djavan	Charlie Brown Jr.; Chico Buarque; Jota Quest; Raimundos	
2001	Sandy & Junior	Charlie Brown Jr.; Marisa Monte; O Rappa; Raimundos	
2002	Sandy & Junior	Cássia Eller; KLB; Skank; Zeca Pagodinho	
2003	Sandy & Junior	Capital Inicial; KLB; Maria Bethânia; Os Paralamas do Sucesso	
2004	Skank	Charlie Brown Jr.; Jota Quest; Maria Rita; Titãs	
2005	O Rappa	Charlie Brown Jr.; Ivete Sangalo; Pitty; Sandy & Junior	
2006	Ivete Sangalo	Capital Inicial; Charlie Brown Jr.; Jota Quest; Los Hermanos	
2007	Ivete Sangalo	Caetano Veloso; Jota Quest; Marcelo D2; O Rappa	
2008	Ana Carolina	Charlie Brown Jr.; Maria Rita; Rita Lee; Vanessa da Mata	
2009	Capital Inicial	Jota Quest; Marcelo D2; Skank; Zeca Pagodinho	

=== 2010s ===
Year	Winner(s)	Nominees	Ref.
2010	Ivete Sangalo	Claudia Leitte; Luan Santana; NX Zero; Victor & Leo	
2011	Luan Santana	Caetano Veloso and Maria Gadú; Exaltasamba; Ivete Sangalo; Victor & Leo	
2012	Paula Fernandes	Jorge e Mateus; Luan Santana; O Rappa; Jota Quest	
2013	Paula Fernandes	Ivete Sangalo; Luan Santana; Caetano Veloso; Naldo Benny	
2014	Ivete Sangalo	Paula Fernandes; Thiaguinho; Luan Santana; Só Pra Contrariar	
2015	Anitta	Henrique e Juliano; Luan Santana; Paula Fernandes; Sorriso Maroto	
2016	Anitta	Joelma; Jorge & Mateus; Luan Santana; Paula Fernandes	
2017	Joelma	Anitta; Luan Santana; Simone & Simaria; Thiaguinho	
2018	Marília Mendonça	Luan Santana; Anitta; Simone & Simaria; Bruno & Marrone	
2019	Marília Mendonça	BaianaSystem; Gusttavo Lima; Thiaguinho; Tribalistas	

=== 2020s ===
Year	Winner(s)	Nominees	Ref.
2020	Marília Mendonça (Live of the Year)	Caetano Veloso; Bruno & Marrone; Gusttavo Lima; Ivete Sangalo	
2021	Ivete Sangalo (Performance of the Year)	Anitta; Gusttavo Lima; Luísa Sonza; Pabllo Vittar	
2022	Turnê Irmãos – Alexandre Pires and Seu Jorge	Turnê Meu Coco – Caetano Veloso; Turnê Nu – Djonga; Tour AmarElo – Emicida; Turnê Pirata – Jão; Turnê Numanice – Ludmilla; Tour Portas – Marisa Monte; Turnê Infinito – Thiaguinho	
2023	Numanice 2023 – Ludmilla	Icarus – BK'; Rock in Rio 2022 – Ludmilla; Turnê Portas 2023 – Marisa Monte; Turnê Titãs Reencontro – Titãs	
2024	—N/a	Caetano & Bethânia; 3.0: A Festa and Rock in Rio 2024 – Ivete Sangalo; Rock in Rio 2024 – Iza; SuperTurnê and Rock in Rio 2024 – Jão; Numanice #3 Tour and Rock in Rio 2024 – Ludmilla; Baseado em Fatos Reais: 30 anos de Fumaça and Rock in Rio 2024 – Planet Hemp	
