= Multishow Brazilian Music Award for Instrumentalist of the Year =

Brazilian music industry award

- Country: Brazil
- Presented by: Multishow
- First award: 1998
- Currently held by: Amaro Freitas
- Website: Official website

Multishow Brazilian Music Award for Instrumentalist of the Year is an award presented annually at the Multishow Brazilian Music Award, first introduced in the 1998 edition. From 1998 to 2011, the award was named Best Instrumentalist. In 2022, the award name was changed to its current title.

== Recipients ==
=== 1990s ===
Year	Winner(s)	Nominees	Ref.
1998	Carlinhos Brown	Hermeto Pascoal; Léo Gandelman; Milton Guedes; Tony Bellotto	
1999	João Barone	Carlinhos Brown; Marcos Suzano; Roberto de Carvalho; Tony Bellotto	

=== 2000s ===
Year	Winner(s)	Nominees	Ref.
2000	Tony Bellotto	Digão; Jaques Morelenbaum; João Barone; Paulo Moura	
2001	Lulu Santos	Digão; Edgard Scandurra; Igor Cavalera; Marcelo Yuka	
2002	Edgar Scandurra	Davi Moraes; Igor Cavalera; John Ulhoa; Lenine	
2003	João Barone	Carlinhos Brown; Edgar Scandurra; Junior Lima; Milton Guedes	
2004	Champignon	George Israel; Junior Lima; Tony Bellotto; Yamandu Costa	
2005	Junior Lima	Edgard Scandurra; Roberto de Carvalho; Rodrigo Amarante; Roberto Frejat	
2006	Rodrigo Amarante	Frejat; Japinha; Marco Túlio; Yves Passarell	
2007	Champignon	Japinha; Marco Túlio; Martin Mendonça; Thiago Castanho	
2008	Radamés Venâncio	Bino; Davi Moraes; Marco Túlio; Yves Passarell	
2009	Débora Teicher	Christiaan Oyens; Gee Rocha; Gigi; Martin Mendonça	

=== 2010s ===
Year	Winner(s)	Nominees	Ref.
2010	Rodrigo Tavares	Cadu; Cesinha; Haroldo Ferretti; Joe Gomes	
2011	João Barone	Gee Rocha; Koba; Paulinho Fonseca; Victor Chaves	

=== 2020s ===
Year	Winner(s)	Nominees	Ref.
2022	Pretinho da Serrinha	Amaro Freitas; Castilhol; Hamilton de Holanda; Jonathan Ferr; Kiko Dinucci; Mateus Asato; Silvanny Sivuca	
2023	Pretinho da Serrinha	Amaro Freitas; Hamilton de Holanda; Jonathan Ferr; Rafael Castilhol; Silvanny Sivuca	
2024	Amaro Freitas	Hamilton de Holanda; Hermeto Pascoal; Jonathan Ferr; Pretinho da Serrinha; Rafael Castilhol	
