= Jota Quest =

Brazilian pop rock band

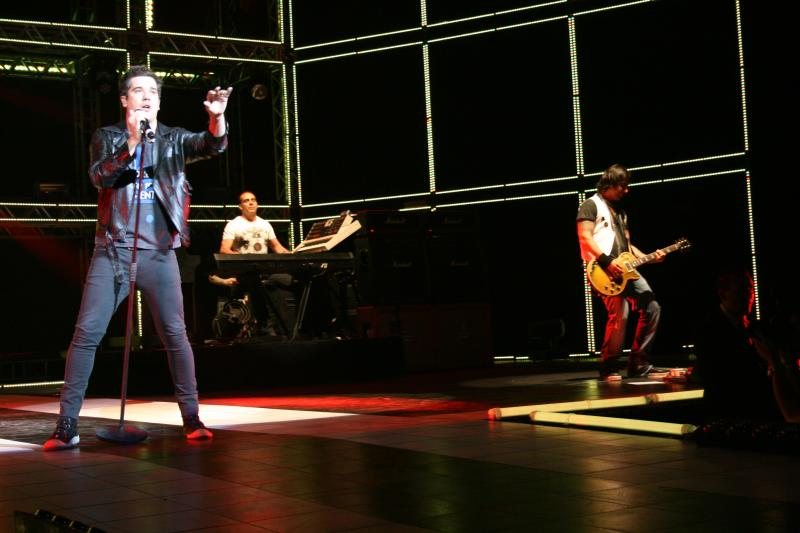

Background information
- Also known as: J. Quest
- Origin: Belo Horizonte, MG, Brazil
- Genres: Pop rock; funk rock; dance punk; acid jazz; post-disco; psychedelic soul
- Years active: 1993–present
- Labels: Epic; Sony BMG
- Members: Rogério Flausino; Márcio Buzelin; Marco Túlio; PJ; Paulinho Fonseca
- Website: http://jotaquest.com.br

Jota Quest is a Brazilian pop rock band. The band was founded in 1993 in Belo Horizonte, Minas Gerais as J. Quest, but due to trademark issues with Hanna-Barbera, they renamed themselves Jota Quest (jota being the Portuguese name for the letter j). The band members include: Rogério Flausino (vocals), Marco Túlio Lara (guitar), Márcio Buzelin (keyboards), PJ (bass) and Paulinho Fonseca (drums). Jota Quest initially stood apart from Minas Gerais' musical tradition by garnering national success with pop rock and blue-eyed soul-tinged pop. Eventually the band exposed its Clube da Esquina influences, including collaborations with Minas Gerais exponents Paulinho Pedra Azul and Milton Nascimento in Oxigenio as well as jams with 14 Bis and a collaboration with Roberto Carlos over his hit single "Alem do Horizonte". Jota Quest sold over 4,000,000 copies in Brazil, Latin America and Portugal.

== Biography ==
The group played their first show as J. Quest inspired by the cartoon Jonny Quest, the idea of bassist PJ. At the time, the group played the bar circuit and schools of Belo Horizonte and gathered more than 2,000 people per show. With this, the band was gaining ground. Next the contract with Sony Music came, and then the first official CD was released in August 1996. The bar band's most successful song is their rendition of "As Dores do Mundo", a huge hit by Bahian soulman Hyldon in the '70s. It quickly entered the charts, followed by other singles, while the band toured Brazil. On this first tour, the band members came on stage wearing "black power" wigs. Another hit from their first album was "Encontrar Alguém", a very disco. Even with the success, it took a while for them to get on television. On 11 January 1997, they were invited by the presenter Xuxa to perform at what was then called "Xuxa Hits", which belonged to Rede Globo television. It was the first performance of Jota Quest on TV.

The band's second release was De Volta ao Planeta, more conventionally pop rock, spawning more hit singles, especially the signature song "Fácil". The album's title song was "De Volta ao Planeta" with monkey noises backgrounding its chorus. The album became a Brazilian best-seller. This tour was marked for the first Brazilian Solar Energy supplied live show, a project with Greenpeace. In 2009, the title track of the album was used in the hugely successful telenovela Caras & Bocas, resulting in the song receiving moderate airplay on Brazilian radio and a short stay on the national charts.

A relative commercial failure, due to the band's previous sales figures, their association with an Internet provider as well as advertising for Fanta. The band tried a new direction on its third record, an ecological oriented and experimental release called Oxigênio. It moved away from the dance floor, with increased production values, experimental songwriting and sponsored by the greatest Coca-Cola marketing campaign in Latin America. The Brazilian Grammy winner singer Milton Nascimento recorded with the band on this album the song "Destes Tantos Modos". Although the album went Platinum it is largely considered a hodgepodge.

In 2001, they returned to their original formula with bass guitar grooves, funk rock guitar riffs and beautiful lyrics with Discotecagem Pop Variada, their fourth album. Jota Quest recapped the bar band feeling with hits like "Na Moral" and the ballad "Só Hoje". In 2002, Rogério Flausino was invited by Disney to sing the Brazilian version of the Treasure Planet's soundtrack. The song is called Estou Aqui. With the success of the last record, the Jota Quest recorded on days 1 and 2 May 2003, the CD/DVD MTV ao Vivo: Jota Quest at the Praça do Papa, in Belo Horizonte, broadcast by MTV Brasil. First live record of the group, gathered the biggest hits of the band and also had the special participation of Arnaldo Antunes and Thaíde. In the same year, they were the only ones in Latin America to be invited to participate in the soundtrack of the movie Spider-Man 2, that also had a version for the cartoon. The lyrics were made by Rogério Flausino.

Ten years after launching the first CD, the band was consolidated in the Brazilian pop rock's scenario. Altogether there were five CDs, thousands of shows and attendance records all over Brazil, presentations in the U.S. and recently in Europe, where they attended the opening of the Rock in Rio Lisboa, sharing the stage with Carlos Santana and Roger Waters. After four years without releasing a CD with new material, the group got isolated in his studio in Belo Horizonte to record the album Até Onde Vai, which arrived at the stores in October 2005, and since then, remains between the country's best-selling CDs. The album fused rock and funk elements and contained their cover version of Brazilian singer Roberto Carlos's "Além do Horizonte" which became a major hit. The album produced a further string of hit singles, all receiving heavy rotation on Brazilian radio stations, including: "O Sol", "Palavras de Um Futuro Bom" at the tail-end of 2006, and most recently "Já Foi" in the first half of 2007. This album was a 7th Annual Latin Grammy nominated. Lead singer Rogerio Flausino was also invited to sing in English on electronic dance act Layo and Bushwacka's 2006 album. In 2007, Rogério Flausino received the Multishow Award for being the best singer in Brazil. In the same year on 13 August, he became a father, having her first daughter, Nina. The "Até Onde Vai" toure were the longest one of Jota Quest.

In 2008, the band released the album La Plata, recorded in the studio Minério de Ferro, three years after their last record. The CD quickly became successful on the radio with the songs "La Plata", which was on the soundtrack of TV Globo's soap opera "Cama de Gato", and the ballad "Vem Andar Comigo", very well played, and theme of the Soap Opera "Caras e Bocas",

In late July, the third single "Seis e Trinta" was released on the radio and the music video came out in September. At the end of November 2009 the ballad "Único Olhar" was released, the seventh track of La Plata. In 2010 "Tudo Me Faz Lembar Você" was also released as the soundtrack of the film "Muita Calma Nessa Hora".

In the second half of 2010, the Jota Quest launched to the Hispanic market their first Spanish album, entitled "Dias Mejores". The album was released first in Argentina. In early March 2011, the Jota Quest announced a tour commemorating their 15-year career. The "J15 - 15 Anos na Moral" is a kind of five-hour-long party, where the band will present a three-hour show with three new tracks. The project will be released on CD/DVD. The Quinze compilation was released in May and has two CDs and 30 tracks, among three hits and new songs. In early 2012, Quinze was awarded a Latin Grammy for Best Brazilian Contemporary Pop Album, the first Grammy award in the group's career.

== Band members ==
- Rogério Flausino – lead vocals, acoustic guitar
- Marco Túlio Lara – electric and acoustic guitars, backing vocals
- Henrique Reis – saxophone, backing vocals
- Marcio Buzelin – keyboards
- PJ – bass
- Paulinho Fonseca – drums

== Discography ==
=== Studio albums ===
- (1996) Jota Quest
- (1998) De Volta ao Planeta
- (2000) Oxigênio
- (2002) Discotecagem Pop Variada
- (2005) Até Onde Vai
- (2008) La Plata
- (2013) Funky Funky Boom Boom
- (2015) Pancadélico
- (2024) De Volta ao Novo

=== Live/video albums ===
- (2003) MTV ao Vivo: Jota Quest
- (2006) Até Onde Vai – Ao Vivo em Porto Alegre
- (2012) Multishow ao Vivo: Jota Quest – Folia & Caos
- (2012) Ao Vivo no Rock in Rio
- (2017) Acústico Jota Quest

=== Compilation albums ===
- (2004) DVD Clipes
- (2012) Quinze

=== Bootleg recordings ===
- (2005) Rio de Janeiro, 28/01/2005

=== Singles ===
Year	Single	Peak chart positions	Album
Year	Single	BRA Billboard	Album
1996	"As Dores do Mundo"	44	Jota Quest
1996	"Encontrar Alguém"	11	Jota Quest
1996	"Onibusfobia"	20	Jota Quest
1998	"Fácil"	1	De Volta ao Planeta
1998	"Sempre Assim"	16	De Volta ao Planeta
1998	"De Volta ao Planeta"	1	De Volta ao Planeta
1998	"O Vento"	2	De Volta ao Planeta
2000	"Oxigênio"	20	Oxigênio
2000	"Tele-fome"	3	Oxigênio
2000	"Dias Melhores"	1	Oxigênio
2000	"O Que Eu Também Não Entendo"	23	Oxigênio
2002	"Na Moral"	6	Discotecagem Pop Variada
2002	"Só Hoje"	23	Discotecagem Pop Variada
2003	"Amor Maior"	1	MTV ao Vivo: Jota Quest
2003	"Do Seu Lado"	2	MTV ao Vivo: Jota Quest
2004	"Mais Uma Vez"	29	MTV ao Vivo: Jota Quest
2004	"Tema do Homem-Aranha"	—	Spider-Man 2
2005	"Além do Horizonte"	1	Até Onde Vai
2005	"O Sol"	7	Até Onde Vai
2006	"Palavras de Um Futuro Bom"	7	Até Onde Vai
2006	"Já Foi"	23	Até Onde Vai
2008	"Até Onde Vai"	47	Até Onde Vai
2008	"La Plata"	16	La Plata
2009	"Vem Andar Comigo"	8	La Plata
2009	"Seis e Trinta"	7	La Plata
2009	"Único Olhar"	26	La Plata
2010	"Tudo Me Faz Lembrar Você"	75	La Plata
2011	"É Preciso (A Próxima Parada)"	21	Quinze
2012	"Mais Perto de Mim"	16	Multishow ao Vivo: Jota Quest – Folia & Caos
2012	"Tudo Está Parado"	20	Multishow ao Vivo: Jota Quest – Folia & Caos
2012	"Tempos Modernos"	21	Mega Hits: Jota Quest
2013	"Mandou Bem"	21	Funky Funky Boom Boom
2014	"Waiting for You (Party On)"	19	Funky Funky Boom Boom
2014	"Dentro de um Abraço"	64	Funky Funky Boom Boom
2015	"Reggae Town" (feat. Natiruts)	6	Funky Funky Boom Boom
2015	"Blecaute" (feat. Anitta e Nile Rodgers)	39	Pancadélico
2016	"Um Dia Pra Não Se Esquecer" (feat. Projota)	57	Pancadélico
2017	"Daqui Só Se Leva o Amor"	88	Pancadélico
2017	"Pra Quando Você Se Lembrar de Mim"	60	Acústico Jota Quest
2018	"Você Precisa de Alguém" (feat. Marcelo Falcão)	53	Acústico Jota Quest
2018	"Morrer de Amor" (solo ou feat. Alexandre Carlo)	58	Acústico Jota Quest
2019	"Todas as Janelas"	—	Saideira - Acústico Sessions
2020	"A Voz do Coração" (feat. Rael)	38	
2021	"Imprevisível"	34	

== See also ==
- Pato Fu
- Skank
