= List of Multishow Brazilian Music Award winners and nominees =

Brazilian music industry award

This is a list of nominations and winners of the Multishow Brazilian Music Award, a Brazilian music award held annually by the Multishow channel since 1994. The event celebrates the leading talents in Brazilian music, recognizing the diversity of genres and musical styles. Most awards are granted by the Multishow Award Academy, composed of music industry experts.

Among the most awarded artists, Anitta stands out with 23 awards and Ivete Sangalo with 21 awards, which makes them the record holders of the ceremony. In terms of nominations, Anitta leads with 60, followed by Ivete with 56. Luan Santana, in turn, holds the record as the most awarded and nominated male artist.

Below is the complete list of nominees and winners by edition.

== List of nominees and winners ==
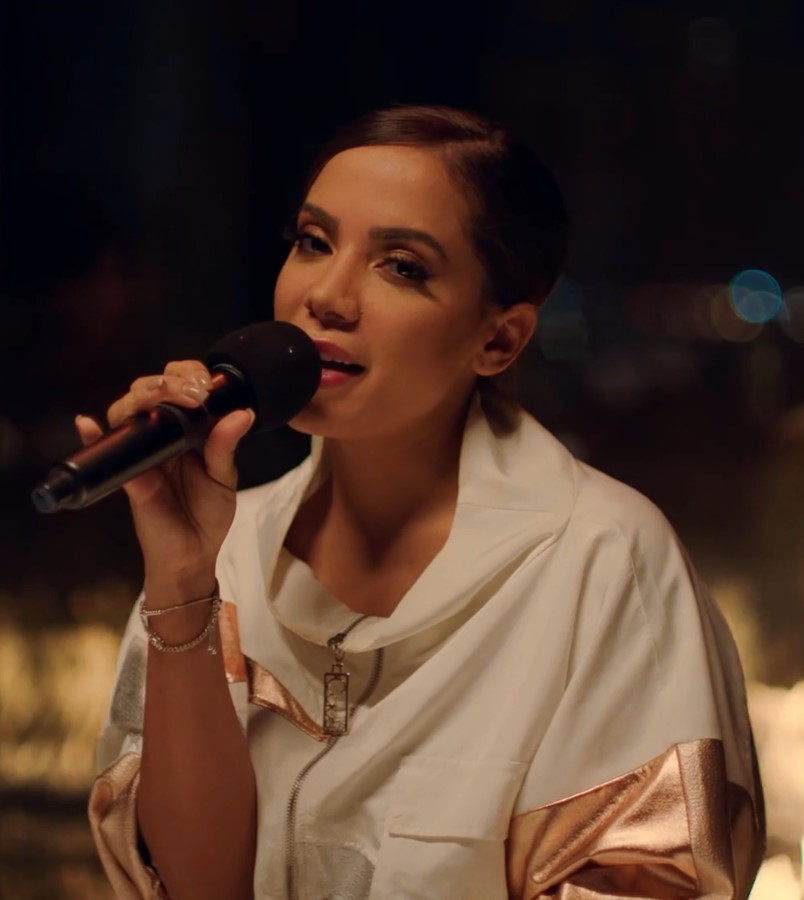
Anitta is the most awarded and nominated artist in the history of the award.

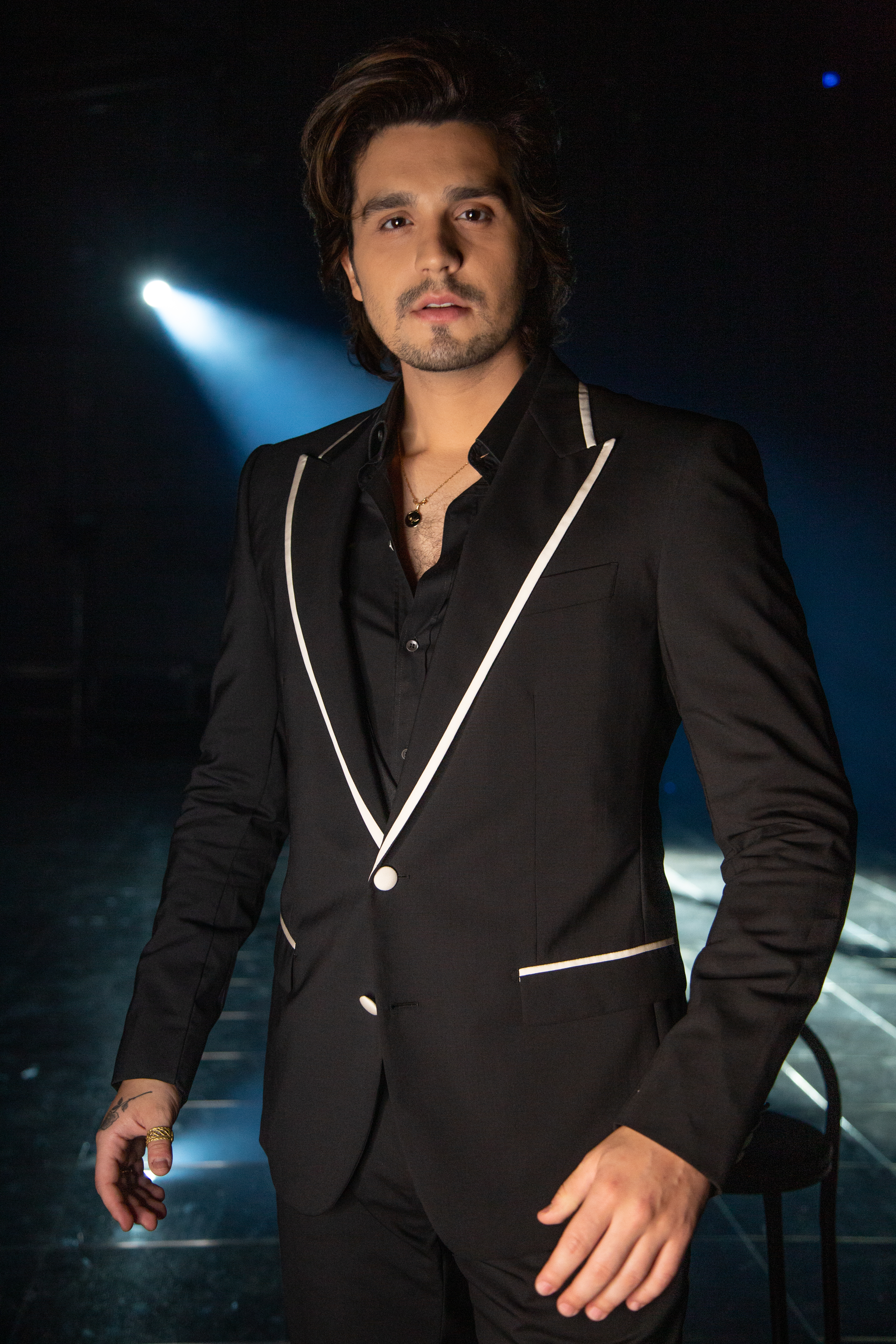
Luan Santana is the male artist with the highest number of awards and nominations.

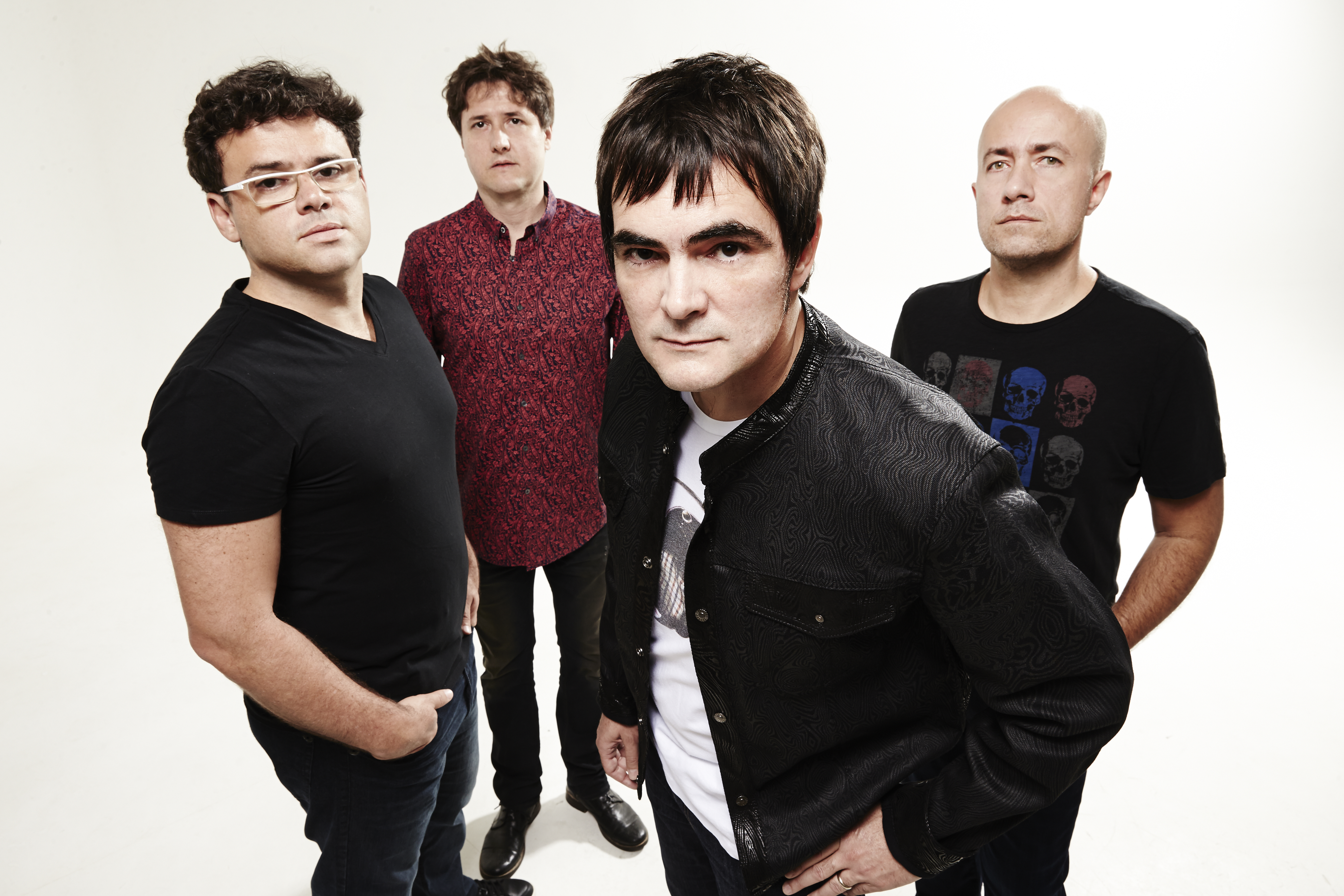
Skank holds the record as the band/group with the most awards and nominations.

Artists	Nominations	Awards won	Ref.
Anitta	60 2013 – 3, 2014 – 1, 2015 – 6, 2016 – 8, 2017 – 6, 2018 – 5, 2019 – 4, 2020 – 4, 2021 – 5, 2022 – 8, 2023 – 5, 2024–5	23 2013 – 2, 2015 – 2, 2016 – 2, 2017 – 3, 2018 – 2, 2019 – 2, 2020 – 1, 2021 – 2, 2022 – 3, 2023 – 1, 2024 – 3	
Ivete Sangalo	56 1998 – 2, 1999 – 1, 2000 – 2, 2001 – 3, 2002 – 2, 2003 – 1, 2004 – 1, 2005 – 3, 2006 – 2, 2007 – 4, 2008 – 4, 2009 – 1, 2010 – 3, 2011 – 4, 2012 – 2, 2013 – 3, 2014 – 2, 2015 – 1, 2016 – 1, 2017 – 1, 2018 – 3, 2019 – 1, 2020 – 2, 2021 – 2, 2023 – 1, 2024 – 4	21 1999 – 1, 2001 – 1, 2003 – 1, 2005 – 1, 2006 – 1, 2007 – 2, 2008 – 2, 2010 – 1, 2011 – 1, 2012 – 1, 2013 – 1, 2014 – 1, 2015 – 1, 2016 – 1, 2018 – 2, 2020 – 1, 2021 – 1, 2024 – 1	
Luan Santana	44 2010 – 5, 2011 – 7, 2012 – 3, 2013 – 3, 2014 – 4, 2015 – 4, 2016 – 4, 2017 – 4, 2018 – 5, 2019 – 1, 2020 – 1, 2021 – 3	12 2010 – 1, 2011 – 1, 2013 – 1, 2014 – 1, 2015 – 2, 2016 – 2, 2017 – 2, 2018 – 1, 2021 – 1	
Skank	34 1995 - 2, 1997 - 1, 1998 - 3, 1999 - 5, 2001 - 1, 2002 - 2, 2003 - 1, 2004 - 4, 2005 - 2, 2007 - 1, 2009 - 5, 2010 - 2, 2011 - 1, 2014 - 1, 2015 - 2, 2016 – 1	8 1995 – 2, 1997 – 1, 1999 – 1, 2004 – 2, 2005 – 1, 2009 – 1	
Ludmilla	29 2015 - 2, 2016 - 3, 2017 - 1, 2018 - 1, 2019 - 2, 2020 - 2, 2021 - 2, 2022 - 6, 2023 - 6 2024 - 4	7 2019 - 2, 2020 - 1, 2022 - 1, 2023 – 2, 2024 – 1	
Jota Quest	29 1999 - 4, 2000 - 2, 2001 - 2, 2003 - 1, 2004 - 4, 2005 - 1, 2006 - 3, 2007 - 2, 2008 - 1, 2009 - 4, 2012 - 1, 2014 - 1, 2015 - 1, 2016 - 1, 2020 - 1	3 2004 – 1, 2006 – 1, 2016 -1	
Marisa Monte	26 1998 - 1, 1999 - 1, 2000 - 1, 2001 - 5, 2002 - 3, 2003 - 1, 2006 - 2, 2009 - 3, 2012 - 2, 2013 - 1, 2014 - 1, 2021 - 1, 2022 - 3, 2023 - 1	6 1998 - 1, 2001 – 2, 2002 – 1, 2009 – 2	
Pitty	26 2004 - 1, 2005 - 4, 2006 - 3, 2007 - 2, 2008 - 4, 2010 - 5, 2011 - 2, 2012 - 2, 2014 - 1, 2015 - 1, 2016 - 1	7 2004 - 1, 2005 - 2, 2006 - 1, 2010 - 1, 2012 - 1, 2016 – 1	
Caetano Veloso	23 1998 - 1, 1999 - 2, 2000 - 1, 2001 - 1, 2002 - 2, 2004 - 1, 2005 - 1, 2007 - 3, 2008 - 1, 2010 - 1, 2011 - 1, 2013 - 3, 2016 - 1, 2018 - 1, 2020 - 1, 2022 – 1, 2023 – 1	5 1999 – 1, 2001 – 1, 2004 – 1, 2013 – 1, 2023 – 1	
Ana Carolina	23 2000 - 1, 2002 - 1, 2004 - 1, 2005 - 3, 2006 - 4, 2007 - 2, 2008 - 2, 2009 - 2, 2010 - 1, 2012 - 2, 2013 - 2, 2015 - 2	6 2006 - 2, 2007 - 1, 2008 - 1, 2010 – 1, 2012 – 1	
Luísa Sonza	22 2017 - 1, 2019 - 1, 2020 - 3, 2021 - 4, 2022 - 3, 2023 - 7, 2024 - 3	2 2017 - 1, 2020 - 1	
NX Zero	18 2007 - 1, 2008 - 3, 2009 - 3, 2010 - 5, 2011 - 4, 2012 - 1, 2023 - 1	6 2007 - 1, 2008 - 1, 2009 - 1, 2010 - 1, 2011 - 1, 2012 - 1	
Iza	19 2017 - 1, 2018 - 1, 2019 - 2, 2020 - 1, 2021 - 2, 2022 - 4, 2023 - 7, 2024 - 1	5 2018 - 1, 2022 - 1, 2023 - 3	
Titãs	19 1998 - 6, 1999 - 5, 2000 - 1, 2002 - 1, 2003 - 1, 2004 - 1, 2009 - 1, 2010 - 2, 2023 - 1	8 1998 - 3, 1999 - 3, 2002 - 1, 2010 - 1	
Charlie Brown Jr.	18 1998 - 3, 2000 - 2, 2001 - 3, 2004 - 1, 2005 - 3, 2006 - 2, 2007 - 1, 2008 - 3	2 2007 - 1, 2008 - 1	
Sandy & Junior	17 2000 - 3, 2001 - 3, 2002 - 3, 2003 - 3, 2004 - 2, 2005 - 2, 2020 - 1	4 2001 - 2, 2002 - 1, 2003 - 1	
Pabllo Vittar	17 2016 - 1, 2017 - 2, 2018 - 1, 2019 - 2, 2020 - 2, 2021 - 3, 2023 - 1, 2024 - 5	3 2017 - 1, 2021 - 1, 2024 - 1	
Jão	17 2019 - 1, 2022 - 6, 2023 - 6, 2024 - 4	2 2023 - 1, 2024 - 1	
Gloria Groove	16 2018 - 1, 2022 - 8, 2023 - 2, 2024 - 5	2 2022 - 1, 2024 - 1	
Paula Fernandes	15 2011 - 4, 2012 - 2, 2013 - 2, 2014 - 3, 2015 - 2, 2016 - 2	6 2011 - 3, 2012 - 1, 2013 - 1, 2014 - 1	
Liniker	15 2017 - 1, 2022 - 1, 2023 - 2, 2024 - 11	4 2024 - 4	
O Rappa	15 2000 – 1, 2001 – 2, 2004 – 1, 2005 – 3, 2006 – 2, 2007 – 1, 2009 – 1, 2012 – 1, 2013 – 1, 2014 – 2	4 2000 – 1, 2005 – 2, 2006 – 1	
Capital Inicial	15 2001 - 1, 2002 - 1, 2003 - 2, 2005 - 1, 2006 - 3, 2007 - 2, 2008 - 2, 2009 - 2, 2011 - 1	3 2001 - 1, 2007 - 1, 2009 - 1	
Jorge & Mateus	14 2010 - 1, 2011 - 1, 2012 - 1, 2016 - 3, 2018 - 1, 2019 - 1, 2020 - 1, 2021 - 1, 2022 - 1, 2023 - 1, 2024 - 2	2 2018 - 1, 2020 - 1	
Os Paralamas do Sucesso	14 1996 - 1, 1998 - 1, 1999 - 3, 2000 - 1, 2001 - 1, 2003 - 3, 2004 - 1, 2006 - 1, 2008 - 1, 2009 - 1	2 1996 - 1, 2003 - 1	
Los Hermanos	14 2000 - 4, 2002 - 1, 2004 - 4, 2005 - 1, 2006 - 4	3 2000 - 2, 2004 - 1	
Marcelo D2	15 2004 - 2, 2005 - 3, 2006 - 1, 2007 - 3, 2008 - 1, 2009 - 5	4 2004 - 1, 2005 - 2, 2007 - 1	
Gusttavo Lima	14 2012 - 2, 2013 - 1 2015 - 1 2017 - 1, 2018 - 1, 2019 - 2, 2020 - 3, 2021 - 2, 2022 - 1	1 2020 - 1	
Marília Mendonça	14 2017 - 2, 2018 - 3, 2019 - 4, 2020 - 2, 2021 - 2, 2023 - 1	5 2018 - 1, 2019 - 1, 2020 - 1, 2021 - 2	
Thiaguinho	14 2012 - 1, 2013 - 2, 2014 - 3, 2015 - 2, 2017 - 2, 2019 - 1, 2020 - 1, 2022 - 1, 2024 - 1	4 2012 - 1, 2013 - 1, 2014 - 2	
Sorriso Maroto	13 2012 - 2, 2013 - 1, 2014 - 1, 2015 - 2, 2016 - 1, 2017 - 1, 2018 - 1, 2019 - 1, 2020 - 1, 2021 - 1, 2024 - 1	2 2013 - 1, 2014 - 1	
Chico Buarque	13 1999 - 1, 2000 - 5, 2006 - 1, 2017 - 6	1 2017 - 1	
Maria Rita	12 2003 - 1, 2004 - 5, 2005 - 1, 2007 - 1, 2008 - 4	2 2004 - 1, 2008 - 1	
Céu	11 2007 - 1, 2015 - 1, 2016 - 9	4 2016 - 4	
CPM 22	11 2002 - 1, 2004 - 2, 2005 - 1, 2006 - 2, 2007 - 2, 2008 - 3	1 2007 - 1	
Vanessa da Mata	11 2004 - 1, 2006 - 2, 2008 - 5, 2009 - 2, 2023 - 1	3 2006 - 1, 2008 - 1, 2009 - 1	
Zeca Pagodinho	11 2001 - 1, 2002 - 1, 2003 - 1, 2004 - 2, 2005 - 1, 2006 - 2, 2007 - 1, 2008 - 1, 2009 - 1	1 2006 - 1	
Sandy	10 2000 - 1, 2001 - 1, 2002 - 1, 2003 - 1, 2004 - 1, 2005 - 1, 2011 - 2, 2017 - 2	2 2000 - 1, 2002 - 1	
João Gomes	10 2021 - 3, 2022 - 1, 2023 - 5, 2024 - 1	2 2023 - 2	
Seu Jorge	10 2006 - 4, 2008 - 1, 2009 - 1, 2011 - 1, 2016 - 1, 2022 - 1, 2024 - 1	3 2006 - 1, 2009 - 1, 2022 - 1	
Lulu Santos	9 1995 - 1, 2001 - 2, 2002 - 1, 2006 - 1, 2007 - 1, 2008 - 1, 2014 - 1, 2024, - 1	3 1995 - 1, 2001 - 1, 2008 - 1	
O Terno	9 2012 - 1, 2013 - 1, 2014 – 2, 2016 – 4, 2017 – 1	3 2012 – 1, 2016 – 1, 2017 – 1	
BaianaSystem	9 2016 - 3, 2017 - 1, 2019 - 4, 2020 - 1	2 2016 - 2	
Simone & Simaria	9 2016 - 1, 2017 - 3, 2018 - 4, 2019 - 1	3 2016 - 1, 2017 - 2	
Tulipa Ruiz	9 2011 - 2, 2012 - 4, 2015 - 3	2 2011 - 1, 2012 - 1	
Henrique & Juliano	9 2015 - 1, 2016 - 1, 2017 - 1, 2018 - 1, 2020 - 2, 2021 - 1, 2022 - 1, 2024 - 1	1 2016 - 1	
Ferrugem	9 2016 - 1, 2019 - 3, 2021 - 1, 2023 - 2, 2024 - 2	1 2019 - 1	
Wesley Safadão	9 2016 - 3, 2017 - 2, 2018 - 2, 2019 - 1, 2023 - 1	1 2016 - 1	
Emicida	8 2011 -1, 2014 - 1, 2015 - 1, 2019 - 1, 2020 - 2, 2021 - 1, 2022 - 1	2 2015 - 1, 2020 - 1	
Criolo	8 2011 -1, 2012 -1, 2014 - 1, 2015 - 2, 2017 - 1, 2022 - 1, 2023 -1	2 2011 - 1, 2023 - 1	
Restart	8 2010 - 3, 2011 - 3, 2012 - 1, 2013 - 1	3 2010 - 1, 2011 - 2	
Marina Sena	8 2021 - 5, 2023 - 3	3 2021 - 3	
Raimundos	8 2000 - 6, 2001 - 2	1 2000 - 1	
Maria Gadú	8 2010 - 4, 2011 - 3, 2012 - 1	1 2010 - 1	
Dennis	8 2017 - 1, 2019 - 1, 2021 - 1, 2023 - 4, 2024 - 1	2 2023 - 1, 2024 - 1	
Daniela Mercury	8 1995 - 1, 1997 - 1, 1998 -1, 1999 - 1, 2001 - 1, 2002 - 2, 2008 - 1	3 1995 - 1, 1997 - 1, 2002 - 2	
Gilberto Gil	8 2001 - 2, 2003 - 2, 2005 - 1, 2008 - 1, 2014 -1, 2024 -1	2 2003 - 1, 2024 - 1	
Dilsinho	7 2019 - 2, 2020 - 1, 2021 - 2, 2023 - 2	1 2019 - 1	
Rincon Sapiência	7 2017 - 7	3 2017 - 3	
Elza Soares	7 2016 - 2, 2018 - 3, 2023 - 2	2 2016 - 1, 2023 - 1	
Gal Costa	7 1998 - 3, 2004 - 1, 2012 - 2, 2015 - 1	2 2012 - 1, 2015 - 1	
Pedro Sampaio	7 2020 - 1, 2021 - 1, 2022 - 1, 2023 - 1, 2024 - 3	2 2020 - 1, 2024 - 1	
Victor & Leo	7 2010 - 3, 2011 - 4	1 2010 - 1	
Kevin O Chris	7 2019 - 1, 2021 - 1, 2023 - 4, 2024 - 1	1 2023 - 1	
Turma do Pagode	7 2013 - 1, 2014 - 1, 2015 -1, 2016 -1, 2017 - 1, 2018 - 1, 2019 -1	1 2015 – 1	
Leo Santana	7 2018 - 1, 2020 -1, 2023 - 4, 2014 -1	1 2023 - 1	
Samuel Rosa	7 1999 - 1, 2004 - 1, 2008 - 1, 2009 -1, 2010 -1, 2020 -1, 2024 -1	1 2010- 1	
Karol Conká	6 2013 - 2, 2015 - 3, 2022 - 1	2 2013 - 1, 2015 - 1	
Tropkillaz	6 2015 - 3, 2018 - 2, 2019 -1	3 2015 - 1, 2018 - 2	
Baco Exu do Blues	6 2018 - 2, 2022 - 2, 2023 - 1, 2024 - 1	2 2018 - 2	
Fresno	6 2009 - 2, 2010 - 1, 2011 - 1, 2012 - 1, 2024 - 1	1 2009 -1	
Metá Metá	6 2013 - 3, 2015 - 1, 2016 - 2	2 2013 - 1, 2015 - 1	
Cássia Eller	6 2000 - 1, 2002 - 4, 2007 - 1	2 2002 - 2	
Maiara & Maraisa	6 2021 - 1, 2022 - 2, 2023 - 2, 2024 - 1	1 2022 -1	
Ana Castela	6 2022 - 1, 2023 - 4, 2024 - 1	1 2022 -1	
Lagum	5 2019 - 1, 2020 - 1, 2021 - 1, 2022 - 1, 2023 - 1	4 2019 - 1, 2020 - 1, 2021 - 1, 2022 - 1	
Pretinho da Serrinha	5 2022 - 1, 2023 - 2, 2024 - 2	4 2022 - 1, 2023 - 2, 2024 - 1	
Michel Teló	5 2011 - 1, 2012 - 3, 2013 - 1	3 2012 - 2, 2013 - 1	
Tribalistas	5 2003 - 4, 2019 - 1	3 2003 - 3	
Djavan	5 1998 - 1, 1999 - 1, 2000 - 3	3 2000 - 3	
Simone Mendes	5 2023 - 2, 2024 - 3	3 2023 - 2, 2024 - 1	
Zaac	5 2018 - 2, 2019 - 1, 2020 - 2	2 2018 - 2	
Frejat	5 2002 - 1, 2003 - 1, 2004 - 1, 2005 - 1, 2006 - 1	2 2003 - 1, 2004 - 1	
Di Ferrero	5 2008 - 1, 2010 - 1, 2011 - 1, 2012 - 1, 2013 - 1	2 2008 - 1, 2011 - 1	
Xande de Pilares	5 2013 - 1, 2016 - 1, 2023 - 3	2 2023 - 2	
Rita Lee	5 1999 - 1, 2002 - 1, 2003 - 1, 2008 - 1, 2009 - 1	1 2009 - 1	
Negra Li	5 2007 - 3, 2009 - 2	1 2009 - 1	
Nadson o Ferinha	5 2023 - 4, 2024 - 1	1 2023 - 1	
Kevinho	5 2017 - 1, 2018 - 3, 2019 - 1	1 2019 - 1	
Menos é Mais	5 2020 - 1, 2021 - 1, 2022 - 1, 2023 - 1, 2024 - 1	1 2020 - 1	
Lucas Lucco	5 2015 - 2, 2016 - 2, 2017 - 1	1 2015 - 1	
Lucas Santtana	5 2012 - 2, 2013 - 1, 2014 - 1, 2017 - 1	1 2017 - 1	
Letrux	5 2017 - 5	1 2017 - 1	
Silva	5 2012 - 1, 2013 - 2, 2014 - 1, 2016 - 1	1 2013 - 1	
João Barone	4 1999 - 1, 2000 - 1, 2003 - 1, 2011 - 1	3 1999 - 1, 2003 - 1, 2011 - 1	
Mahmundi	4 2013 - 1, 2014 - 1, 2016 - 2	3 2013 - 1, 2014 - 1, 2016 - 1	
Carlinhos Brown	4 1997 - 1, 1998 - 1, 1999 - 1, 2003 - 1	2 1997 - 1, 1998 - 1	
Duda Beat	4 2019 - 2, 2021 - 1, 2024 - 1	2 2019 - 1, 2021 - 1	
Gabriel, o Pensador	4 1998 - 4	2 1998 - 2	
Grelo	4 2024 - 4	1 2024 - 1	
Edgard Scandurra	4 2001 – 1, 2002 – 1, 2003 – 1, 2005 – 1	1 2002 – 1	
Gaby Amarantos	4 2012 - 2, 2024 - 2	1 2012 - 1	
Kiko Dinucci	4 2012 - 1, 2020 - 2, 2022 - 1	1 2021 - 1	
Tony Bellotto	4 1998 -1, 1999 - 1, 2000 - 1, 2004 - 1	1 2000 - 1	
Pato Fu	4 1996 - 1, 1999 - 2, 2001 - 1	1 1996 - 1	
Joelma	4 2016 - 1, 2017 - 2, 2018 - 1	1 2017 - 1	
Zé Neto & Cristiano	4 2019 - 1, 2020 - 1, 2021 - 1, 2023 - 1	1 2019 - 1	
Djonga	4 2019 - 1, 2022 - 1, 2023 - 2	1 2023 - 1	
Juçara Marçal	3 2014 - 1, 2021 - 2	3 2014 - 1, 2021 - 2	
Israel & Rodolffo	3 2021 - 3	2 2021 - 2	
Papatinho	3 2019 - 1, 2022 - 1, 2023 - 1	2 2019 - 1, 2022 - 1	
Rouge	3 2003 - 2, 2018 - 1	2 2003 - 1, 2018 - 1	
Cícero	3 2012 - 3	2 2012 - 2	
Cine	3 2009 - 1, 2010 - 2	2 2009 - 1, 2010 - 1	
Ava Rocha	3 2015 - 3	2 2015- 2	
Lauana Prado	3 2024 - 3	2 2024 - 2	
Roberto Carlos	3 1998 - 1, 2002 - 2	1 2002 - 1	
Erasmo Carlos	3 2003 - 2, 2008 - 1	1 2003 - 1	
Arnaldo Antunes	3 2002 - 3	1 2002 - 1	
Planet Hemp	3 2023 - 2, 2024 - 1	1 2023 - 1	
Kid Abelha	3 1996 - 1, 2003 - 2	1 1996 - 1	
Cidade Negra	3 1997 - 1, 2005 - 2	1 1997 - 1	
Maurício Manieri	3 2000 - 2, 2001 - 1	1 2000 - 1	
Rodrigo Amarante	3 2005 - 1, 2006 - 1, 2013 - 1	1 2006 - 1	
Dinho Ouro Preto	3 2006 - 1, 2008 - 1, 2010 - 1	1 2006 - 1	
Amaro Freitas	3 2022 - 1, 2023 - 1, 2024 - 1	1 2024 - 1	
Junior Lima	3 2003 - 1, 2004 - 1, 2005 - 1	1 2005 - 1	
Babado Novo	3 2004 - 1, 2006 - 1, 2007 - 1	1 2004 - 1	
Cidadão Instigado	3 2010 - 1, 2015 - 2	1 2015 - 1	
Rogério Flausino	3 2007 - 1, 2009 - 1, 2011 - 1	1 2007 - 1	
Martin Mendonça	3 2007 - 1, 2008 - 1, 2012 - 1	1 2012 - 1	
Bonde do Rolê	3 2012 - 1, 2014 - 1, 2015 - 1	1 2014 - 1	
Exaltasamba	3 2011 - 3	1 2011 - 1	
Jorge Ben Jor	3 2003 - 1, 2011 - 1, 2012 - 1	1 2011 - 1	
Michael Jackson	2 1996 - 1, 1997 - 1	2 1996 - 1, 1997 - 1	
Banda do Mar	2 2014 - 2	2 2014 - 2	
Champignon	2 2004 - 1, 2007 - 1	2 2004 - 1, 2007 - 1	
DJ Yuri Martins	2 2018 - 2	2 2018 - 2	
Gang do Eletro	2 2012 - 1, 2013 - 1	2 2012 - 1, 2013 - 1	
Maejor	2 2018 - 2	2 2018 - 2	
Vanessa Rangel	2 1998 - 2	2 1998 - 2	
Alok	2 2023 - 1, 2024 - 1	2 2023 - 1, 2024 - 1	
Liniker e os Caramelows	2 2016 - 2	1 2016 - 1	
Viviane Batidão	2 2024 - 2	1 2024 - 1	
Isadora Pompeo	2 2024 - 2	1 2024 - 1	
Barão Vermelho	2 1999 – 1, 2024 – 1	1 2024 – 1	
MC Livinho	2 2019 – 1, 2023 – 1	1 2019 – 1	
Fernanda Abreu	2 1996 - 1, 1998 - 1	1 1996 - 1	
Marjorie Estiano	2 2006 - 1, 2008 - 1	1 2006 - 1	
Terra Samba	2 1999 - 2	1 1999 - 1	
Zaynara	2 2024 - 2	1 2024 - 1	
Marcelo Falcão	2 2005 - 1, 2018 - 1	1 2018 – 1	
Black Alien	2 2005 - 1, 2019 - 1	1 2019 - 1	
Marcelo Camelo	2 2011 - 1, 2012 - 1	1 2011 - 1	
Marcelo Jeneci	2 2011 - 1, 2014 - 1	1 2011 - 1	
Banda Tereza	2 2012 - 1, 2013 - 1	1 2012 - 1	
Copacabana Club	2 2010 – 1, 2011 – 1	1 2011 – 1	
Felipe Araújo	2 2019 – 2	1 2019 – 1	
Lexa	2 2019 - 1, 2020 - 1	1 2020 - 1	
Baby do Brasil	2 2013 - 1, 2016 - 1	1 2016 - 1	
Oba Oba Samba House	2 2013 - 1, 2014 - 1	1 2013 - 1	
Alice Caymmi	2 2014 - 2	1 2014 - 1	
Sam Alves	2 2014 - 1, 2015 - 1	1 2014 - 1	
Atitude 67	2 2018 - 1, 2019 - 1	1 2019 - 1	
JS o Mão de Ouro	2 2020 - 2	1 2020 - 1	
Filipe Ret	2 2022 - 2	1 2022 - 1	
MC Carol	2 2023 - 2	1 2023 - 1	
Melly	2 2023 - 1, 2024 - 1	1 2023 - 1	
Ney Matogrosso	2 2014 - 1, 2016 - 1	1 2016 - 1	

== Nominees without wins ==
This section lists artists who have received multiple nominations for the Multishow Brazilian Music Award but, despite their nominations, have never won in any category.

Artists	Nominations	Ref.
Claudia Leitte	11 2007 – 1, 2008 – 3, 2009 – 2, 2010 – 2, 2013 – 2, 2014 – 1	
Matuê	7 2022 -1, 2023 - 2, 2024 - 4	
Adriana Calcanhotto	6 2001 - 3, 2002 - 1, 2003 - 1, 2005 - 1	
Gilsons	6 2021 - 1, 2022 - 2, 2023 - 2, 2024 - 1	
Matheus & Kauan	5 2016 - 1, 2017 - 1, 2018 - 1, 2019 - 1, 2022 - 1	
Anavitória	5 2017 - 1, 2019 - 1, 2020 - 1, 2021 - 1, 2022 - 1	
Nando Reis	5 2001 - 1, 2005 - 1, 2007 - 1, 2008 - 1, 2014 - 1	
Lenine	5 2002 - 1, 2003 - 1, 2008 - 1, 2009 - 1, 2016 - 1	
Banda Eva	5 1998 - 3, 1999 - 1, 2009 - 1	
KLB	5 2001 - 1, 2002 - 3, 2003 - 1	
Leonardo	5 2002 - 3, 2023 - 2	
Jovem Dionisio	5 2022 - 5	
Maria Bethânia	4 2003 - 2, 2005 - 1, 2024 - 1	
Nego do Borel	4 2015 - 1, 2016 - 1, 2017 - 1, 2018 - 1	
L7nnon	4 2021 - 1, 2022 - 3	
Nattan	4 2022 - 1, 2023 - 2, 2024 - 1	
Castilhol	4 2022 - 1, 2023 - 1, 2024 - 2	
Zélia Duncan	4 1999 - 2, 2008 - 2	
KayBlack	4 2023 - 2, 2024 - 2	
Jota.pê	4 2024 - 4	
Yago Oproprio	4 2024 - 4	
Ana Frango Elétrico	3 2020 - 2, 2023 - 1	
Zé Vaqueiro	3 2021 - 1, 2023 - 1, 2024 - 1	
Xamã	3 2021 - 1, 2022 - 2	
Matheus Fernandes	3 2021 - 2, 2023 - 1	
Gabriel Diniz	3 2019 - 3	
Black Pantera	3 2022 - 1, 2024 - 2	
Hamilton de Holanda	3 2022 - 1, 2023 - 1, 2024 - 1	
Jonathan Ferr	3 2022 - 1, 2023 - 1, 2024 - 1	
Tiago Iorc	3 2016 - 1, 2017 - 2	
Veigh	3 2023 - 3	
BK'	3 2023 - 3	
Mu540	3 2023 - 2, 2024 - 1	
Àttooxxá	3 2023 - 1, 2024 - 2	
Só Pra Contrariar	3 1998 - 2, 2014 - 1	
Milton Nascimento	3 1998 - 1, 1999 - 1, 2003 - 1	
Hori	3 2010 - 3	
Davi Moraes	3 2002 - 1, 2003 - 1, 2008 - 1	
Jorge Vercillo	3 2003 - 3	
Dead Fish	3 2005 - 1, 2024 - 2	
Ira!	3 2002 - 2, 2007 - 1	
Detonautas	3 2003 - 1, 2004 - 1, 2005 - 1	
Chorão	3 2004 - 1, 2007 - 1, 2008 - 1	
Marco Túlio	3 2006 - 1, 2007 - 1, 2008 - 1	
Lucas Silveira	3 2010 - 2, 2011 - 1	
Sophia Abrahão	3 2014 - 1, 2016 - 2	
Diogo Nogueira	3 2008 - 2, 2014 - 1	
Harmonia do Samba	2 2000 - 1, 2018 - 1	
LS Jack	2 2000 - 1, 2003 - 1	
Hermeto Pascoal	2 1998 - 1, 2024 - 1	
Milton Guedes	2 1998 - 1, 2003 - 1	
Digão	2 2000 - 1, 2001 - 1	
Luxúria	2 2006 - 1, 2007 - 1	
Papas da Língua	2 2007 - 2	
Igor Cavalera	2 2001 - 1, 2002 - 1	
Roberto de Carvalho	2 1999 - 1, 2005 - 1	
Mallu Magalhães	2 2009 - 1, 2012 - 1	
Gee Rocha	2 2009 - 1, 2011 - 1	
Legião Urbana	2 2002 - 1, 2006 - 1	
Yves Passarell	2 2006 - 1, 2008 - 1	
Japinha	2 2006 - 1, 2007 - 1	
Grupo Revelação	2 2008 - 1, 2013 - 1	
Banda Calypso	2 2012 - 1, 2015 - 1	
Fiuk	2 2012 - 1, 2013 - 1	
Maria Cecília & Rodolfo	2 2010 - 1, 2011 - 1	
Vitão	2 2019 - 1, 2020 - 1	
MC Kekel	2 2019 - 2	
Banda Uó	2 2012 - 1, 2024 - 1	
Pupillo	2 2012 - 1, 2022 - 1	
Nação Zumbi	2 2012 - 1, 2015 - 1	
Wado	2 2013 - 2	
Valesca Popozuda	2 2014 - 1, 2015 - 1	
MC Guimê	2 2014 - 1, 2015 - 1	
Henrique & Diego	2 2015 - 2	
Onze:20	2 2015 - 1, 2016 - 1	
Roberta Sá	2 2008 - 1, 2009 - 1	
Biel	2 2016 - 2	
Duquesa	2 2024 - 2	
Gabi Luthai	2 2017 - 1, 2018 - 1	
Thayná Bitencourt	2 2017 - 1, 2018 - 1	
Bruno & Marrone	2 2018 - 1, 2020 - 1	
Edgar	2 2018 - 2	
Gustavo Mioto	2 2017 - 1, 2024 - 1	
Naiara Azevedo	2 2017 - 1, 2018 - 1	
Melim	2 2019 - 1, 2020 - 1	
Vitor Kley	2 2020 - 2	
Tyga	2 2020 - 2	
Giulia Be	2 2020 - 2	
Jadsa	2 2021 - 2	
Bala Desejo	2 2022 - 2	
Natanzinho Lima	2 2024 - 2	
Tasha & Tracie	2 2022 - 2	
Os Hawaianos	2 2022 - 2	
DJ Bel da CDD	2 2022 - 2	
DJ Biel do Furduncinho	2 2022 – 2	
Gustah	2 2022 – 2	
Neobeats	2 2022 – 2	
Urias	2 2022 – 2	
Mari Fernandez	2 2022 - 1, 2024 - 1	
WIU	2 2022 - 1, 2023 - 1	
Os Garotin	2 2023 - 1, 2024 - 1	
Felipe Amorim	2 2023 - 2	
Maria Marçal	2 2023 - 2	
Gabriela Rocha	2 2023 – 1, 2024 – 1	
Ton Carfi	2 2023 - 1, 2024 - 1	
Rachel Reis	2 2022 - 1, 2023 - 1	
Silvanny Sivuca	2 2022 - 1, 2023 - 1	
Eduardo Pepato	2 2022 - 1, 2024 - 1	
Rafinha RSQ	2 2022 - 1, 2023 - 1	
Vhoor	2 2022 - 1, 2023 - 1	
Rich the Kid	2 2023 - 2	
Iuri Rio Branco	2 2023 - 1, 2024 - 1	
MC Cabelinho	2 2024 - 2	

== Artists with a single nomination ==
This section presents artists who received only a single nomination for the Multishow Brazilian Music Award. Some of these artists won with their only nomination, while others did not secure the award.

Award Winners

- Bamdamel – 1995
- Renato Russo – 1996
- George Michael – 1996
- Madonna – 1996
- Rolling Stones – 1996
- Oasis – 1996
- Eric Clapton – 1997
- Alanis Morissette – 1997
- U2 – 1997
- Os Virguloides – 1997
- Spice Girls – 1997
- Fat Family – 1999
- Wanessa Camargo – 2001
- Falamansa – 2001
- Tim Maia – 2001
- Luciana Mello – 2002
- SNZ – 2002
- Luiza Possi – 2003
- Herbert Vianna – 2004
- Motirô – 2005
- Chico Science – 2007
- Ben Harper – 2008
- Strike – 2008
- Radamés Venâncio – 2008
- Débora Teicher – 2009
- Kadu Gauer – 2009
- Rodrigo Tavares – 2010
- Móveis Coloniais de Acaju – 2010
- Tiago Cardoso – 2010
- Monique Kessous – 2011
- Garotas Suecas – 2011
- Momo – 2011
- Nevilton – 2011
- Bárbara Eugênia – 2013
- Guilherme Arantes – 2013
- Boogarins – 2014
- Racionais MC's – 2014
- Jamz – 2015
- Siba – 2015
- Teresa Cristina – 2016
- Ney Matogrosso – 2016
- Maluma – 2017
- Hungria Hip Hop – 2018
- Day – 2018
- Anelis Assumpção – 2018
- Snoop Dogg – 2019
- Rennan da Penha – 2019
- MC Rebecca – 2020
- Felipe Original – 2020
- Rico Dalasam – 2020
- Dinho – 2020
- Jup do Bairro – 2020
- Trevo – 2021
- Alexandre Pires – 2022
- Isa Buzzi – 2023
- Kleber Lucas – 2023
- Sarah Guedes – 2023
- Rapaz do Dread – 2023
- Manu Bahtidão – 2024
- Thullio Milionário – 2024
- MC Hariel – 2024
- Cazuza – 2024

Nominees

- Amigos – 1998
- Netinho – 1998
- Claudinho & Buchecha – 1998
- Zeca Baleiro – 1998
- Léo Gandelman – 1998
- Ed Motta – 1999
- Farofa Carioca – 1998
- Nativus – 1999
- Vinny – 1999
- Marcos Suzano – 1999
- Rodolfo Abrantes – 2000
- Érika Martins – 2000
- Dudu Nobre – 2000
- Wilson Sideral – 2000
- Penélope – 2000
- Rumbora – 2000
- Jaques Morelenbaum – 2000
- Paulo Moura – 2000
- Belo – 2001
- Pedro Mariano – 2001
- Max de Castro – 2001
- Catedral – 2001
- O Surto – 2001
- Tihuana – 2001
- Marcelo Yuka – 2001
- Kelly Key – 2002
- Paula Lima – 2002
- Robinson Monteiro – 2002
- Cajamanga – 2000
- Lampirônicos – 2000
- Peixelétrico – 2000
- John Ulhoa – 2000
- Beto Lee – 2003
- Fernanda Porto – 2003
- Berimbrown – 2003
- Rodox – 2003
- Seu Cuca – 2003
- Toni Garrido – 2004
- Paula Toller – 2004
- Felipe Dylon – 2004
- Luka – 2004
- Preta Gil – 2004
- Eletrosamba – 2004
- Kaleidoscópio – 2004
- Lan Lan – 2004
- Reação em Cadeia – 2004
- George Israel – 2004
- Yamandu Costa – 2004
- Raul Seixas – 2005
- Dibob – 2005
- Rapazolla – 2005
- Hateen – 2006
- Jay Vaquer – 2006
- Cachorro Grande – 2006
- Forfun – 2006
- Leela – 2006
- Megh Stock – 2007
- Armandinho – 2007
- Maskavo – 2007
- Moptop – 2007
- Thiago Castanho – 2007
- Saulo Fernandes – 2008
- Martinho da Vila – 2008
- Juan Luis Guerra – 2008
- Velha Guarda da Portela – 2008
- Monarco – 2008
- Sombrinha – 2008
- Leci Brandão – 2008
- Casuarina – 2008
- Roberto Silva – 2008
- Beth Carvalho – 2008
- Ivan Lins – 2008
- Mariana Aydar – 2008
- João Bosco – 2008
- Alcione – 2008
- Elton Medeiros – 2008
- Luiz Melodia – 2008
- Jair Rodrigues – 2008
- Ana Cañas – 2008
- Scracho – 2008
- Vanguart – 2008
- Natiruts – 2008
- Bino – 2008
- Gloria – 2009
- Primadonna – 2009
- Túlio Dek – 2009
- Christiaan Oyens – 2009
- Gigi – 2009
- Cezar Correa – 2009
- Lívia Nicoliello – 2009
- Renato Iezzi – 2009
- Stevens – 2010
- César Menotti & Fabiano – 2010
- Cadu – 2010
- Cesinha – 2010
- Haroldo Ferretti – 2010
- Joe Gomes – 2010
- Nina Becker – 2010
- Stop Play Moon – 2010
- Bruna Knudsen Rodrigues – 2010
- Douglas Vieira de Sousa (Doug Sousa) – 2010
- Henrique Rangel Mello de Sales – 2010
- Lu Alone – 2011
- Johnny and The Hookers – 2011
- Roberta Spindel – 2011
- Koba – 2011
- Paulinho Fonseca – 2011
- Victor Chaves – 2011
- Black Drawing Chalks – 2011
- Madame Zero – 2011
- Thiago Pethit – 2011
- VOWE – 2011
- Aviões do Forró – 2012
- Banda Dorgas – 2012
- Banda Volk – 2012
- Banda Baleia – 2012
- Banda Valetes – 2012
- Dengue – 2012
- Jorge Du Peixe – 2012
- Lúcio Maia – 2012
- Passo Torto – 2012
- Romulo Fróes – 2012
- Rodrigo Campos – 2012
- Marcelo Cabral – 2012
- Chiclete com Banana – 2013
- Naldo Benny – 2013
- Lia Sophia – 2013
- P9 – 2013
- Sambô – 2013
- Roberta Campos – 2013
- Munhoz & Mariano – 2013
- MC Koringa – 2013
- Bonde das Maravilhas – 2013
- Apanhador Só – 2013
- Real da Rima – 2013
- Clarice Falcão – 2013
- Strobo – 2013
- Micael Borges – 2014
- Pedro Baby – 2014
- MC Gui – 2014
- Psirico – 2014
- Russo Passapusso – 2014
- Sexy Fi – 2014
- Péricles – 2015
- Malta – 2015
- Mosquito – 2015
- Suricato – 2015
- Projota – 2015
- Figueroas – 2015
- Tiê – 2015
- Rashid – 2015
- Luisinho – 2015
- Dônica – 2015
- Lila – 2015
- Maglore – 2015
- Fly – 2016
- MC Duduzinho – 2016
- Marcos & Belutti – 2016
- MC Bin Laden – 2016
- Laura Lavieri – 2016
- Diogo Strausz – 2016
- As Baías|As Bahias e a Cozinha Mineira – 2016
- MC Nego Bam – 2017
- Arthur Aguiar – 2017
- Ana Gabriela – 2017
- Mariana Nolasco – 2017
- Johnny Hooker – 2017
- Luiza Lian – 2017
- Rakta – 2017
- Imaginasamba – 2018
- Thiago Brava – 2018
- Jorge – 2018
- Carol & Vitoria – 2018
- Ariel Mançanares – 2018
- MC Loma e As Gêmeas Lacração – 2018
- Jonas Esticado – 2018
- Zeca Veloso – 2018
- Moreno Veloso – 2018
- Tom Veloso – 2018
- MC Pupio – 2018
- MC Doguinha – 2018
- Luedji Luna – 2018
- Maria Beraldo – 2018
- Tim Bernardes – 2018
- Malía – 2019
- J Balvin – 2019
- Majur – 2019
- Josyara – 2019
- MC Tha – 2019
- Agnes Nunes – 2020
- Elana Dara – 2020
- Fran – 2020
- Thiaguinho MT – 2020
- Mila – 2020
- MC Lan – 2020
- Skrillex – 2020
- TroyBoi – 2020
- Ty Dolla Sign – 2020
- MC Ingryd – 2020
- DJ Henrique da VK – 2020
- Rosa Neon – 2020
- Os Barões da Pisadinha – 2021
- Tuyo – 2021
- Luccas Carlos – 2021
- Afrocidade – 2022
- Raça Negra – 2022
- Diego & Victor Hugo – 2022
- Yoùn – 2022
- Teto – 2022
- MC Pedrinho – 2022
- Mateus Asato – 2022
- Pablo Bispo – 2022
- Prateado – 2022
- Ruxell no Beat – 2022
- Rubel – 2023
- Banda Rock Beats – 2023
- Joyce Alane – 2023
- Pedro Libe – 2023
- Oh Polêmico – 2023
- A Dama – 2023
- MC Ryan SP – 2023
- MC Daniel – 2023
- Kotim – 2023
- DJ Matt D – 2023
- DJ Dyamante – 2023
- Supercombo – 2023
- Sophia Chablau e Uma Enorme Perda de Tempo – 2023
- Eric Land – 2023
- Tarcísio do Acordeon – 2023
- Alanzim Coreano – 2023
- Iguinho & Lulinha – 2023
- Ávine Vinny – 2023
- Thales Lessa – 2023
- Clovis – 2023
- Sarah Beatriz – 2023
- Vulgo FK – 2023
- MC PH – 2023
- Pedro Lotto – 2023
- Marquinho no Beat – 2023
- Bvga Beatz – 2023
- Prod Malax – 2023
- Vintage Culture – 2023
- Carol Biazin – 2023
- Thiago Pantaleão – 2023
- Douglas Moda – 2023
- Nave – 2023
- Sued Nunes – 2024
- Thauane – 2024
- Vitor Limma – 2024
- Yan – 2024
- Gustavo Ruiz Chagas – 2024
- Julio Fejuca – 2024
- Heitor Costa – 2024
- O Kannalha – 2024
- Parangolé – 2024
- É o Tchan! – 2024
- Raidol – 2024
- AQNO – 2024
- Anna – 2024
- Mochakk – 2024
- Paulete Lindacelva – 2024
- Seu Desejo – 2024
- DJ Topo – 2024
- MC Leozin – 2024
- MC G15 – 2024
- Oruam – 2024
- Didi – 2024
- DJ LC da Roça – 2024
- MC K9 – 2024
- MC Smith – 2024
- Mainstreet – 2024
- DJ Zigão – 2024
- DJ Lafon do Md – 2024
- MC Rodrigo do CN – 2024
- MC Rf – 2024
- The Box – 2024
- MC Brinquedo – 2024
- MC Cebezinho – 2024
- MC Laranjinha – 2024
- MC Tuto – 2024
- DJ Oreia – 2024
- Julliany Souza – 2024
- Fhop Music – 2024
- Débora Rabelo – 2024
- Hamilton Rabelo – 2024
- Yunk Vino – 2024
- Go Dassisti – 2024
- Ajuliacosta – 2024
- Felipe & Rodrigo – 2024
