= Multishow Brazilian Music Award for Album of the Year =

Brazilian music industry award

- Country: Brazil
- Presented by: Multishow
- First award: 1998
- Most recent winner: Dominguinho – João Gomes, Mestrinho and Jota.pê (2025)

Highlights
- Most awards: Marcelo D2; Titãs (2 each)
- Most nominations: Sandy & Junior (5)

The Multishow Brazilian Music Award for Album of the Year is an award given at the annual Multishow Brazilian Music Awards. From 1998 to 2009, the award was named Best CD. The category was later renamed to Best Album from 2010 to 2011. In 2012, the award name changed to Best Record, and in 2020, it was altered to its current name.

Marcelo D2 and Titãs are the most awarded artists, with a total of two wins. Sandy & Junior are the act with most nominations in this category, receiving a total of five nods.

== Recipients ==
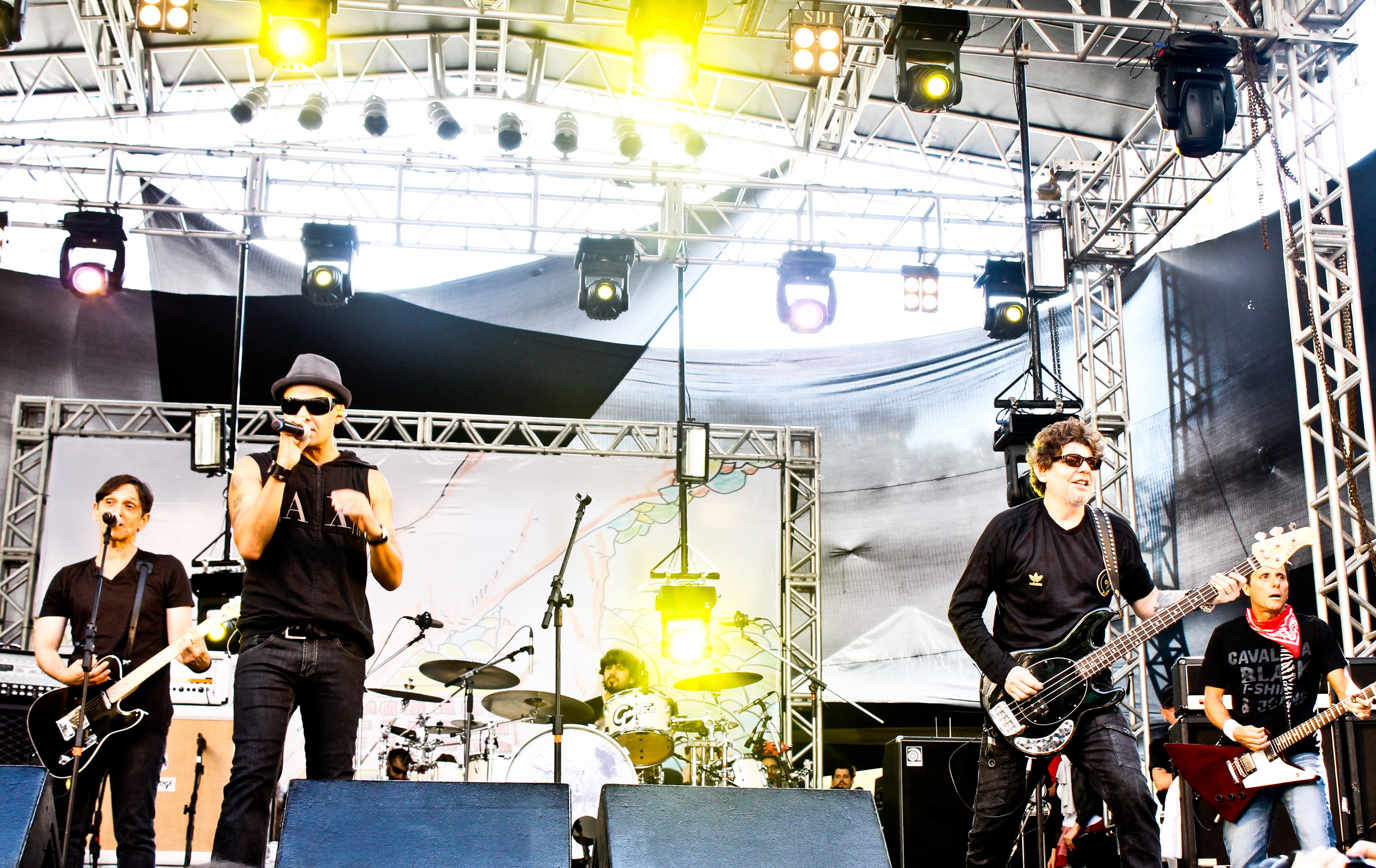
Two-time winner Titãs won in 1998 and 1999.

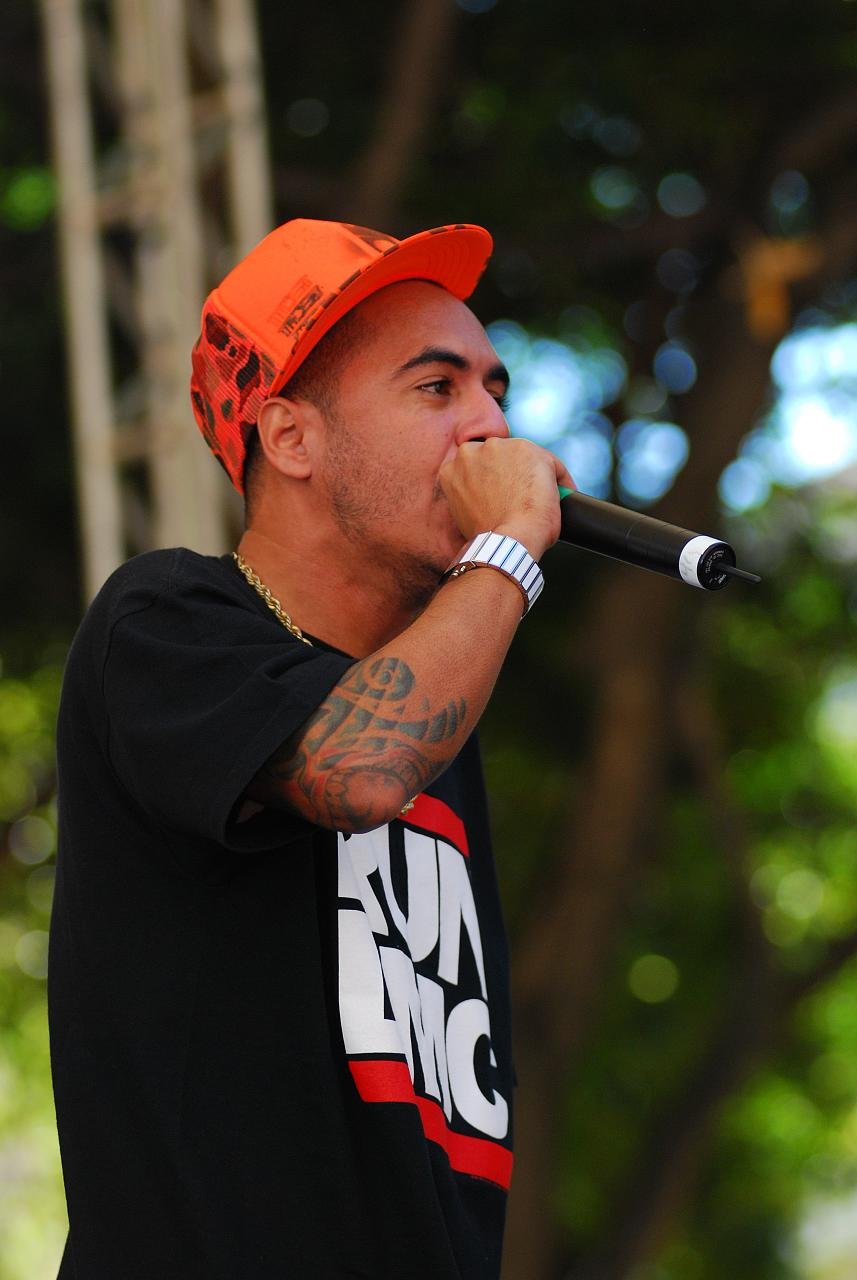
Two-time winner Marcelo D2 won in 2004 and 2005.

=== 1990s ===
Year	Winner(s)	Album	Nominees	Ref.
1998	Titãs	Acústico MTV	Banda Eva – Banda Eva Ao Vivo; Gabriel, o Pensador – Quebra-Cabeça; Gal Costa – Acústico MTV; Só pra Contrariar – Só pra Contrariar	
1999	Titãs	Volume Dois	Chico Buarque – As Cidades; Jota Quest – De Volta ao Planeta; Os Paralamas do Sucesso – Hey Na Na; Skank – Siderado	

=== 2000s ===
Year	Winner(s)	Album	Nominees	Ref.
2000	Djavan	Djavan Ao Vivo	Charlie Brown Jr. – Preço Curto... Prazo Longo; Chico Buarque – Chico Ao Vivo; Raimundos – Só no Forevis; Sandy & Junior – As Quatro Estações	
2001	Marisa Monte	Memórias, Crônicas, e Declarações de Amor	Charlie Brown Jr. – Nadando com os Tubarões; Jota Quest – Oxigênio; Ivete Sangalo – Beat Beleza; Sandy & Junior – Quatro Estações: O Show	
2002	Cássia Eller	Acústico MTV	Arnaldo Antunes – Paradeiro; Los Hermanos – Bloco do Eu Sozinho; Roberto Carlos – Acústico MTV; Sandy & Junior – Sandy & Junior	
2003	Tribalistas	Tribalistas	Kid Abelha — Acústico MTV; Maria Bethânia — Maricotinha: Ao Vivo; Sandy & Junior — Ao Vivo no Maracanã; Zeca Pagodinho — Deixa a Vida Me Levar	
2004	Marcelo D2	A Procura da Batida Perfeita	Los Hermanos – Ventura; Maria Rita – Maria Rita; Sandy & Junior – Identidade; Skank – Cosmotron	
2005	Marcelo D2	Acústico MTV	Charlie Brown Jr. – Tamo Aí na Atividade; Cidade Negra – Perto de Deus; Maria Bethânia – Que Falta Você Me Faz; Nando Reis – MTV ao Vivo	
2006	Ana Carolina and Seu Jorge	Ana & Jorge	Charlie Brown Jr. – Imunidade Musical; Los Hermanos – 4; Marisa Monte – Infinito Particular; Pitty – Anacrônico	
2007	Ivete Sangalo	Multishow ao Vivo: Ivete no Maracanã	Ana Carolina – Dois Quartos; Armandinho – Armandinho: Ao Vivo; Caetano Veloso – Cê; Marcelo D2 – Meu Samba é Assim	
2008	Maria Rita	Samba Meu	Capital Inicial – Eu Nunca Disse Adeus; CPM 22 – Cidade Cinza; Pitty – (Des)Concerto ao Vivo; Vanessa da Mata – Sim	
2009	NX Zero	Agora	Claudia Leitte – Ao Vivo em Copacabana; Jota Quest – La Plata; Marcelo D2 – A Arte do Barulho; Skank – Estandarte	

=== 2010s ===
Year	Winner(s)	Album	Nominees	Ref.
2010	Maria Gadú	Maria Gadú	Hori – Hori; Lucas Silveira – The Rise and Fall of Beeshop; NX Zero – Sete Chaves; Pitty – Chiaroscuro	
2011	Restart	By Day	Luan Santana – Luan Santana: Ao Vivo; NX Zero – Projeto Paralelo; Sandy – Manuscrito; Victor & Leo – Boa Sorte pra Você	
2012	Tulipa Ruiz	Tudo Tanto	Lucas Santtana – O Deus Que Devasta Mas Também Cura; Gal Costa – Recanto	
2013	Guilherme Arantes	Condição Humana	Caetano Veloso – Abraçaço; Metá Metá – MetaL MetaL	
2014	Banda do Mar	Banda do Mar	O Terno – O Terno; Silva – Vista pro Mar	
2015	Cidadão Instigado	Fortaleza	Ava Rocha – Ava Patrya Yndia Yracema; Tulipa Ruiz – Dancê	
2016	BaianaSystem	Duas Cidades	Céu – Tropix; Elza Soares – A Mulher do Fim do Mundo	
2017	Letrux	Letrux em Noite de Climão	Chico Buarque – Caravanas; Rincon Sapiência – Galanga Livre	
2018	Anelis Assumpção	Taurina	Elza Soares – Deus É Mulher; Tim Bernardes – Recomeçar	
2019	Black Alien	Abaixo de Zero: Hello Hell	BaianaSystem – O Futuro Não Demora; Djonga – Ladrão	

=== 2020s ===
Year	Winner(s)	Album	Nominees	Ref.
2020	Emicida	Amarelo	Ana Frango Elétrico – Little Electric Chicken Heart; Kiko Dinucci – Rastilho	
2021	Juçara Marçal	Delta Estácio Blues	Jadsa – Olho de Vidro; Marina Sena – De Primeira	
2022	Filipe Ret	Lume	Anitta – Versions of Me; Baco Exu do Blues – QVVJFA?; Criolo – Sobre Viver; Gilsons – Pra Gente Acordar; Gloria Groove – Lady Leste; Jão – Pirata; Ludmilla – Numanice #2	
2023	Xande de Pilares	Xande Canta Caetano	BK' – Icarus; Elza Soares – No Tempo da Intolerância; Jão – Super; Iza – Afrodhit; Luísa Sonza – Escândalo Íntimo	
2024	Liniker	Caju	Anitta – Funk Generation; Gloria Groove – Serenata da GG, Vol. 1; Jota.pê – Se o Meu Peito Fosse o Mundo; Matuê – 333; Samuel Rosa – Rosa	
2025	João Gomes, Mestrinho and Jota.pê	Dominguinho	BaianaSystem – O Mundo Dá Voltas; BK' – Diamantes, Lágrimas and Rostos para Esquecer; Gaby Amarantos – Rock Doido; Luedji Luna – Um Mar pra Cada Um; Marina Sena – Coisas Naturais	

== Artist with multiple wins ==
2 wins

- Marcelo D2
- Titãs

== Artists with multiple nominations ==
5 nominations

- Sandy & Junior

4 nominations

- Charlie Brown Jr.
- Marcelo D2

3 nominations

- Chico Buarque
- Elza Soares
- Jota Quest
- Los Hermanos
- NX Zero
- Pitty
- Skank

2 nominations

- Anitta
- BaianaSystem
- Caetano Veloso
- Gal Costa
- Gloria Groove
- Ivete Sangalo
- Jão
- Maria Bethânia
- Maria Rita
- Marisa Monte
- Titãs
- Tulipa Ruiz
