= 2013 Multishow Brazilian Music Awards =

20th edition of the Multishow Brazilian Music Awards held in 2013

- Date: 3 September 2013
- Location: HSBC Arena; Rio de Janeiro, Rio de Janeiro, Brazil
- Hosted by: Ivete Sangalo; Paulo Gustavo

Highlights
- Most awards: Anitta (2)
- Most nominations: Anitta; Caetano Veloso; Ivete Sangalo; Luan Santana; Metá Metá (3 each)
- Website: gshow.globo.com/multishow/premio-multishow

Television/radio coverage
- Network: Multishow

The 2013 Multishow Brazilian Music Awards (Portuguese: Prêmio Multishow de Música Brasileira 2013) (or simply 2013 Multishow Awards) (Portuguese: Prêmio Multishow 2013) was held on 3 September 2013, at the HSBC Arena in Rio de Janeiro, Brazil. Ivete Sangalo and Paulo Gustavo hosted the ceremony for the second time.

== Winners and nominees ==
The nominees were announced on 26 August 2013. Anitta, Caetano Veloso, Ivete Sangalo, Luan Santana and Metá Metá received the most nominations with three each. Anitta was the biggest winner, receiving two trophies. Winners are listed in bold.

=== Voted categories ===
The winners of the following categories were chosen by fan votes.

Best Male Singer	Best Female Singer
**Luan Santana**; Di Ferrero; Fiuk; Thiaguinho; Xande de Pilares	**Ivete Sangalo**; Ana Carolina; Cláudia Leite; Marisa Monte; Paula Fernandes
Best Group	Best Show
**Sorriso Maroto**; Chiclete com Banana; O Rappa; Restart; Revelação	**Paula Fernandes**; Caetano Veloso; Ivete Sangalo; Luan Santana; Naldo Benny
Best Song	Earworm Song
**"Buquê de Flores" – Thiaguinho**; "Combustível" – Ana Carolina; "Dançando" – Ivete Sangalo; "Largadinho" – Cláudia Leite; "Te Vivo" – Luan Santana	**"Show das Poderosas" – Anitta**; "Camaro Amarelo" – Munhoz & Mariano; "Dança Sensual" – MC Koringa; "Gatinha Assanhada" – Gusttavo Lima; "Lancinho" – Turma do Pagode
Try It
**Oba Oba Samba House**; Lia Sophia; P9; Roberta Campos; Sambô

=== Professional categories ===
Winners of the following categories were chosen by members of the music industry.

Best Album	New Song
**Condição Humana – Guilherme Arantes**; Abraçaço – Caetano Veloso; MetaL MetaL – Metá Metá	**"Amor Pra Depois" – Silva**; "Now No One Has Anything" – Lucas Santtana; "Palavra Escondida" – Wado
New Artist	New Hit
**Karol Conká**; Anitta; Clarice Falcão; Strobo	**"Calor do Amor" – Mahmundi**; "Maná" – Rodrigo Amarante; "Quadradinho de Borboleta" – Bonde das Maravilhas
Version of the Year	Best Music Video
**"Por Que Brigamos" – Barbará Eugênia**; "Let's Play That" – Metá Metá; "Mais Feliz" – Silva	**"Show das Poderosas" – Anitta**; "Despirocar" – Apanhador Só; "Sandau" – Banda Tereza
Best Show	Shared Song
**Turnê Abraçaço – Caetano Veloso**; **Turnê Gang do Eletro – Gang do Eletro**; Turnê Baby Sucessos – Baby do Brasil	**"MetaL MetaL" – Metá Metá**; "Batuk Freak" – Karol Conká; "Ainda Bem Que Segui As Batidas do Meu Coração" – Real da Rima
