= 2016 Multishow Brazilian Music Awards =

23rd edition of the Multishow Brazilian Music Awards held in 2016

- Date: 25 October 2016
- Location: Rio Arena; Rio de Janeiro, Rio de Janeiro, Brazil
- Hosted by: Fábio Porchat; Tatá Werneck

Highlights
- Most awards: Céu (4)
- Most nominations: Céu (9)
- Website: gshow.globo.com/multishow/premio-multishow

Television/radio coverage
- Network: Multishow

The 2016 Multishow Brazilian Music Awards (Portuguese: Prêmio Multishow de Música Brasileira 2016) (or simply 2016 Multishow Awards) (Portuguese: Prêmio Multishow 2016) was held on 25 October 2016, at the Rio Arena in Rio de Janeiro, Brazil. Television presenters Fábio Porchat and Tatá Werneck hosted the show.

== Performances ==
List of performers at the 2016 Multishow Brazilian Music Awards
| Artist(s) | Song(s) |
|---|---|
| Jota Quest Anitta | "Blecaute" |
| Wesley Safadão | "Camarote" "Coração Machucado" |
| Ludmilla | "Bom" |
| Simone & Simaria | "Meu Violão e o Nosso Cachorro" |
| Paula Fernandes | "Piração" |
| Luan Santana | "Dia, Lugar e Hora" |
| Luan Santana Ivete Sangalo | "Estaca Zero" "Zero a Dez" |
| Ivete Sangalo | "O Farol" |
| Nego do Borel | "Não Me Deixe Sozinho" |
| Tiago Iorc | "Amei Te Ver" |
| Anitta | "Show das Poderosas" "Bang" "Deixa Ele Sofrer" "Ritmo Perfeito" "Zen" "Essa Mina É Louca" "Cobertor" "Meiga e Abusada" "Blá Blá Blá" "Sim ou Não" "Movimento da Sanfoninha" |
| Joelma | "Não Teve Amor" "Voando Pro Pará" |
| Marcos & Belutti | "Aquele 1%" |
| Lucas Lucco | "Batom Vermelho" "Mozão" "Vai Vendo" "Tranquilo e Favorável" |
| Thiaguinho | "Vamo Que Vamo" |
| Ney Matogrosso | "Roendo as Unhas" |
| Dennis DJ MC Nandinho Nego Bam | "Malandramente" |

== Winners and nominees ==
Céu were the most nominated artist, with nine nominations, followed by Anitta with eight. Céu received the most awards with four. Winners appear first and highlighted in bold.

=== Voted categories ===
The winners of the following categories were chosen by fan votes.

| Best Female Singer | Best Male Singer |
|---|---|
| **Ivete Sangalo**; Anitta; Ludmilla; Paula Fernandes; Sophia Abrahão | **Luan Santana**; Biel; Lucas Lucco; Tiago Iorc; Wesley Safadão |
| Best Group | Best Song |
| **Henrique & Juliano**; Jorge & Mateus; Onze:20; Sorriso Maroto; Turma do Pagode | **"Blecaute" – Jota Quest featuring Anitta**; "24 Horas por Dia" – Ludmilla; "Chuva de Arroz" – Luan Santana; "Não Me Deixe Sozinho" – Nego do Borel; "Sosseguei" – Jorge & Mateus |
| Earworm Song | Best Show |
| **"Camarote" – Wesley Safadão**; "Aquele 1%" – Marcos & Belutti featuring Wesley Safadão; "Bang" – Anitta; "Química" – Biel; "Tá Tranquilo, Tá Favorável" – MC Bin Laden featuring Lucas Lucco | **Anitta**; Joelma; Jorge & Mateus; Luan Santana; Paula Fernandes |
| Try It | Best TVZ Music Video |
| **Simone & Simaria**; Ferrugem; Fly; Maiara & Maraisa; Matheus & Kauan | **"Eu, Você, o Mar e Ela" – Luan Santana (Director: Fernando Grostein Andrade)**; "Bom" – Ludmilla (Director: Felipe Sassi); "Bang" – Anitta (Director: Bruno Ilogti and Giovanni Bianco); "Sou Fatal" – Sophia Abrahão (Director: Thiago Calviño); "O Mundo É Nosso" – MC Duduzinho (Director: Raphael Vieira) |

=== Professional categories ===
The winners of the following categories were chosen by members of the music industry.

| Best Hit | Version of the Year |
|---|---|
| **"Playsom" – BaianaSystem**; "Bang" – Anitta; "Zero" – Liniker e os Caramelows | **"Chico Buarque Song" – Céu**; "Quando Alguém Vai Embora" – Laura Lavieri and Diogo Strausz; "Open Bar (Lean On)" – Pabllo Vittar |
| Best Music Video | Good Live Music |
| **"Ai, Ai, Como Eu Me Iludo" – O Terno (Director: Alaska)**; "Bang" – Anitta (Director: Bruno Ilogti and Giovanni Bianco); "Perfume do Invisível" – Céu (Director: Esmir Filho) | **"Lá Vem o Brasil Descendo a Ladeira" – Teresa Cristina, Pitty and Baby do Brasil**; "Alegria, Alegria" – Caetano Veloso, Seu Jorge and Xande de Pilares; "Se Você Pensa" – Skank, Lenine and Anitta |
| New Artist | Song of the Year |
| **Liniker e os Caramelows**; As Bahias e a Cozinha Mineira; Mahmundi | **"Maria da Vila Matilde – Elza Soares**; "Perfume do Invisível" – Céu; "Varanda Suspensa" – Céu |
| Best Album Recording | Best Album Cover |
| **Tropix – Céu**; Duas Cidades – Baiana System; MM3 – Metá Metá | **Mahmundi – Mahmundi**; Tropix – Céu; MM3 – Metá Metá |
| Best Music Video Direction | Best Music Video Cinematography |
| **"Perfume do Invisível" – Céu (Director: Esmir Filho)**; "Ai, Ai, Como Eu Me Iludo" – O Terno (Director: Alaska); "Culpa" – O Terno (Director: Bruno Moreira and Bruno Shintate) | **"Perfume do Invisível" – Céu (Director of Photography: Esmir Filho**; "Culpa" – O Terno (Director of Photography: Fabio Politi and Daniel Belinky); "Feliz e Ponto" – Silva (Director of Photography: William Sossai) |
Best Album
**Duas Cidades – Baiana System**; Tropix – Céu; A Mulher do Fim do Mundo – Elza Soares
