= Multishow Brazilian Music Award for Hit of the Year =

Brazilian music industry award

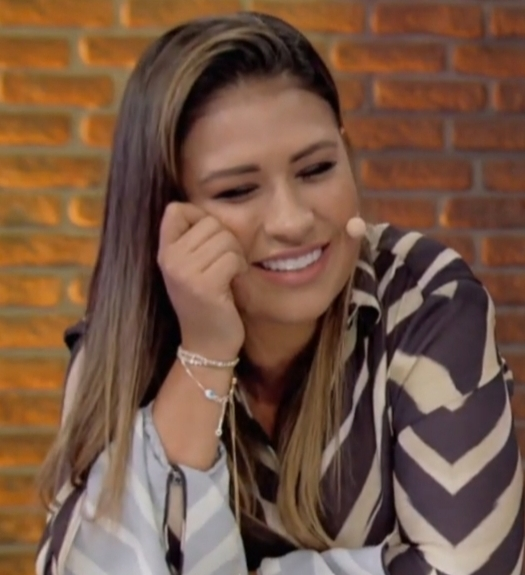
- Last winner: Simone Mendes for "Erro Gostoso"
- Country: Brazil
- Presented by: Multishow
- First award: 2012
- Currently held by: Simone Mendes – "Erro Gostoso" (2023)

Highlights
- Most awards: Anitta; Ludmilla (3 each)
- Website: Official website

Multishow Brazilian Music Award for Hit of the Year is an annual award presented at the Multishow Brazilian Music Award, a ceremony established in 1994 and originally called the TVZ Award. From 2012 to 2016, the category was named New Hit. In 2021, it was renamed Hit of the Year.

== History ==
In its debut, the category was judged by the Specialized Jury, a select group of music industry experts. However, beginning in 2021, the responsibility for selecting the winner shifted to an open vote.

== Recipients ==
=== 2010s ===
Year	Winner(s)	Nominees	Ref.
2012	"Ex Mai Love" – Gaby Amarantos	"Dois Café" – Tulipa Ruiz; "É" – Tulipa Ruiz	
2013	"Calor do Amor" – Mahmundi	Rodrigo Amarante - "Maná" –; Bonde das Maravilhas – "Quadradinho de Borboleta" –	
2014	"Mais Ninguém" – Banda do Mar	"Funk dos Bromânticos" – Lucas Santtana; "Picada Fatal" – MC Livinho	
2015	"Você Não Vai Passar" – Ava Rocha	"Deixa Ele Sofrer" – Anitta; "Melô do Jonas" – Figueroas; "Tombei" – Karol Conká part. Tropkillaz	
2016	"Playsom" – BaianaSystem	"Bang" – Anitta; "Zero" – Liniker e os Caramelows	

=== 2020s ===
Year	Winner(s)	Nominees	Ref.
2021	"Batom de Cereja" – Israel & Rodolffo	"Baby Me Atende" – Matheus Fernandes e Dilsinho; "Deixa de Onda" – Dennis DJ, Ludmilla e Xamã; "Meu Pedaço de Pecado" – João Gomes; "Tipo Gin" – Kevin o Chris	
2022	"Maldivas" – Ludmilla	"Acorda Pedrinho" – Jovem Dionisio; "Dançarina" – Pedro Sampaio e MC Pedrinho; "Desenrola Bate Joga de Ladin" – L7nnon, Os Hawaianos e DJ Bel da CDD (part. DJ Biel do Furduncinho); "Envolver" – Anitta; "Idiota" – Jão; "Malvadão 3" – Xamã, Gustah e Neobeats; "Vermelho" – Gloria Groove	
2023	"Erro Gostoso" – Simone Mendes	"Chico" – Luísa Sonza; "Nosso Quadro" – Ana Castela; "Posturado e Calmo" – Leo Santana; "Tá OK" – Dennis e Kevin o Chris; "Zona de Perigo" – Leo Santana	
2024	—N/a	"Caju" – Liniker; "Escrito nas Estrelas" – Lauana Prado; "Macetando" – Ivete Sangalo e Ludmilla; "Nosso Primeiro Beijo" – Gloria Groove; "São Amores" – Pabllo Vittar; "Só Fé" – Grelo	
