= 2020 Multishow Brazilian Music Awards =

27th edition of the Multishow Brazilian Music Awards held in 2020

- Date: 11 November 2020
- Location: Rio de Janeiro, Rio de Janeiro, Brazil
- Hosted by: Iza; Paulo Gustavo; Tatá Werneck

Highlights
- Most nominations: Anitta (4)
- Website: gshow.globo.com/multishow/premio-multishow

Television/radio coverage
- Network: Multishow

The 2020 Multishow Brazilian Music Awards (Portuguese: Prêmio Multishow de Música Brasileira 2020) (or simply 2020 Multishow Awards) (Portuguese: Prêmio Multishow 2020) was held on 11 November 2020, in Rio de Janeiro, Brazil. Singer Iza and television presenters Paulo Gustavo and Tatá Werneck hosted the show. The performances were filmed at various locations across Brazil due to the COVID-19 pandemic. Anitta led the nominations with four.

== Performances ==
List of performers at the 2020 Multishow Brazilian Music Awards
Artist(s)	Song(s)
Luísa Sonza MC Zaac	"Toma" "Século 21" "Braba"
Ludmilla	"Verdinha Remix" "Rainha da Favela"
Lexa	"Aquecimento da Lexa" "Sussu" "Quebrar Seu Coração"
Iza Elza Soares	"Tente Outra Vez"
Rebecca	"Deslizo e Jogo" "Repara" "Ao Som do 150"
Ivete Sangalo	"Quando A Chuva Passar" "O Farol" "Tempo de Alegria"
Dilsinho	"Deixa Pra Amanhã" "Misturados" "Onze" "Pouquinho e Sogra"
Pedro Sampaio	"Sentadão" "Pode Dançar" "Vai Menina" "Chama Ela"
Lulu Santos	"A Cura"
Kevinho	"Avançada" "Agora é Tudo Meu" "Uma Nora Para Cada Dia" "Se Ferrou"
Skank Jota Quest	"Algo Parecido" "Voz do Coração" "Lanterna dos Afogados"
Iza	"Meu Talismã"
Teresa Cristina	"O Bêbado e a Equilibrista" "O Sol Nascerá"
Jão	"Vou Morrer Sozinho" "Essa Eu Fiz Pro Nosso Amor" "Codinome Beija-Flor" "O Tempo Não Para"
MC Zaac	"Desce Pro Play"
Papatinho L7nnon PK	"Quando a Vontade Bater" "Tá Com O Papato"

== Winners and nominees ==
Nominations were announced on 16 September 2020. Anitta had the most nominations with four, followed by Gusttavo Lima and Luísa Sonza having three nominations each. Winners appear first and highlighted in bold.

=== Voted categories ===
The winners of the following categories were chosen by fan votes.

Female Singer of the Year	Male Singer of the Year
**Ivete Sangalo**; Anitta; Iza; Luísa Sonza; Marília Mendonça	**Gusttavo Lima**; Dilsinho; Emicida; Vitão; Vitor Kley
Group of the Year	Duo of the Year
**Lagum**; BaianaSystem; Jota Quest; Melim; Sorriso Maroto	**Jorge & Mateus**; Anavitória; Henrique & Juliano; Sandy & Junior; Zé Neto & Cristiano
Song of the Year	Bubblegum Song of the Year
**"Verdinha" – Ludmilla**; "A Gente Fez Amor" – Gusttavo Lima; "A Tal Canção Pra Lua" – Vitor Kley and Samuel Rosa; "Desce pro Play (PA PA PA)" – MC Zaac, Anitta and Tyga; "Liberdade Provisória" – Henrique & Juliano	**"Sentadão" – Pedro Sampaio, Felipe Original and JS o Mão de Ouro**; "Braba" – Luísa Sonza; "Desce pro Play (PA PA PA)" – MC Zaac, Anitta and Tyga; "Menina Solta" – Giulia Be; "Tudo Ok" – Thiaguinho MT, Mila and JS o Mão de Ouro
Live of the Year	Experiment
**Marília Mendonça**; Caetano Veloso; Bruno & Marrone; Gusttavo Lima; Ivete Sangalo	**Menos é Mais**; Agnes Nunes; Elana Dara; Fran; Giulia Be
TVZ Music Video of the Year
**"Combatchy" – Anitta, Lexa and Luísa Sonza featuring MC Rebecca (Director: Nixon Freire)**; "Amor de Que" – Pabllo Vittar (Director: João Monteiro); "Asas" – Luan Santana (Director: Gui Dalzoto); "Crise de Saudades" – Léo Santana (Director: Julio Loureiro); "Malokera" – MC Lan, Skrillex and TroyBoi featuring Ludmilla and Ty Dolla Sign (Director: Guilherme Valente)

=== Professional categories ===
The winners of the following categories were chosen by Multishow Award Academy.

New Artist of the Year	Song of the Year
**Jup do Bairro**; Ana Frango Elétrico; Rosa Neon	**"Braile" – Rico Dalasam featuring Dinho**; "Amor de Que" – Pabllo Vittar; "Vem Me Satisfazer" – MC Ingryd featuring DJ Henrique da VK
Album of the Year	Record of the Year
**AmarElo – Emicida**; Little Electric Chicken Heart – Ana Frango Elétrico; Rastilho – Kiko Dinucci	**Rastilho – Kiko Dinucci**
Album Cover of the Year	Direction of the Year
**Rastilho – Kiko Dinucci**	**Céu**
Producer of the Year
**Nave Beatz**
