= Jorge Du Peixe =

Brazilian singer and songwriter

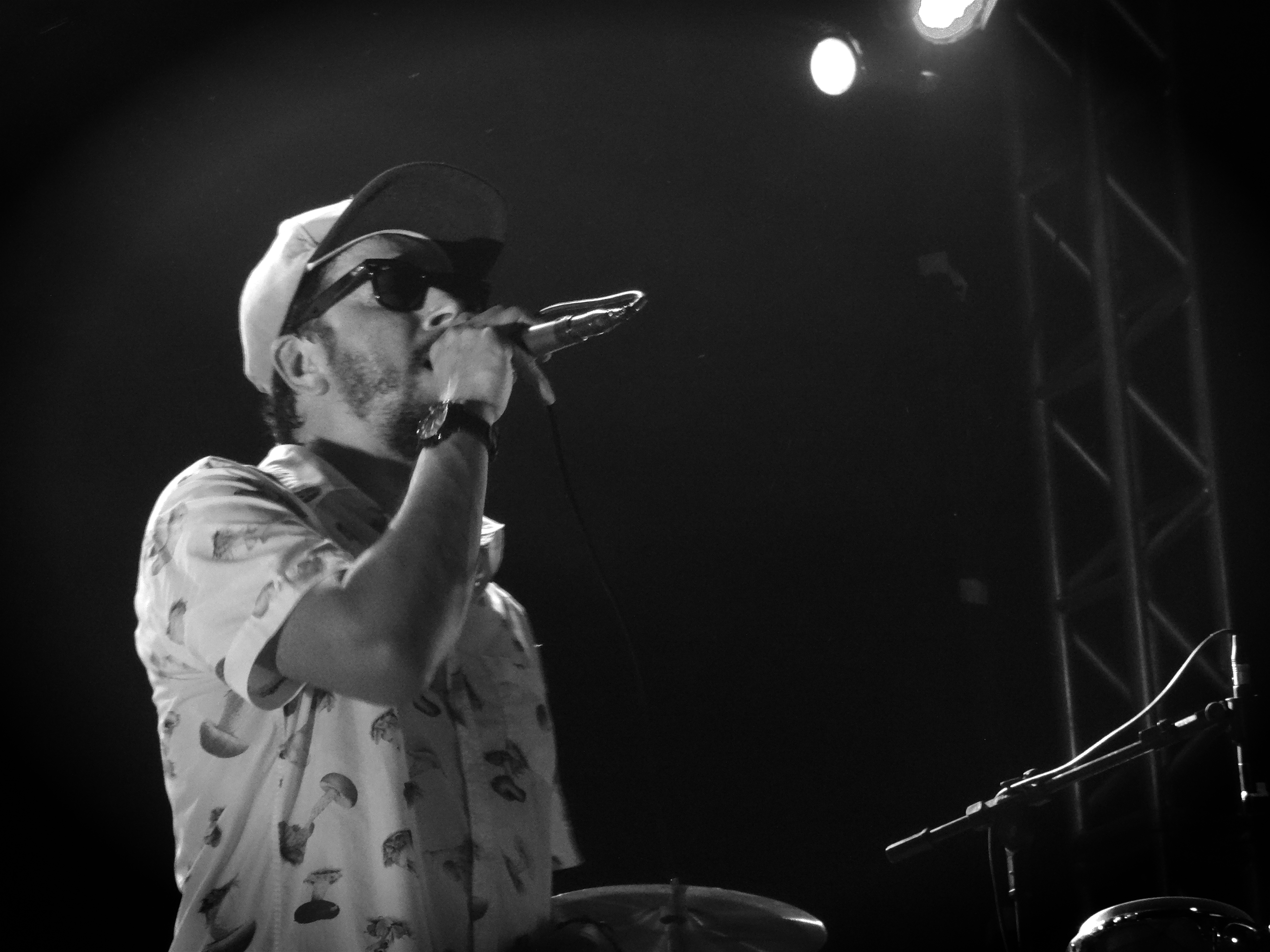

Background information
- Born: January 8, 1967 (age 59); Recife, Pernambuco, Brazil
- Origin: Olinda, Pernambuco, Brazil
- Genres: Rap; Hip hop; Funk
- Years active: 1991–present

Jorge Du Peixe (January 8, 1967), stage name Jorge José Carneiro de Lira, is a Brazilian singer-songwriter.

The musician lived his childhood and part of his adolescence in the neighborhood of Caxangá, in Recife. Then he moved to Salvador, Bahia due to his father's work, living in the capital of Bahia for two years. Upon returning to Recife, he went to live in the Rio Doce neighborhood, which is located in Olinda in the Metropolitan Region of Recife, where he met and became friends with Chico Science. A friendship that was fueled by their interest in urban music culture. Where they came to create the Manguebeat movement, a musical genre that takes influences from Rock, Hip hop and Funk that emerged in the 90s.
