= O Terno =

Brazilian rock band

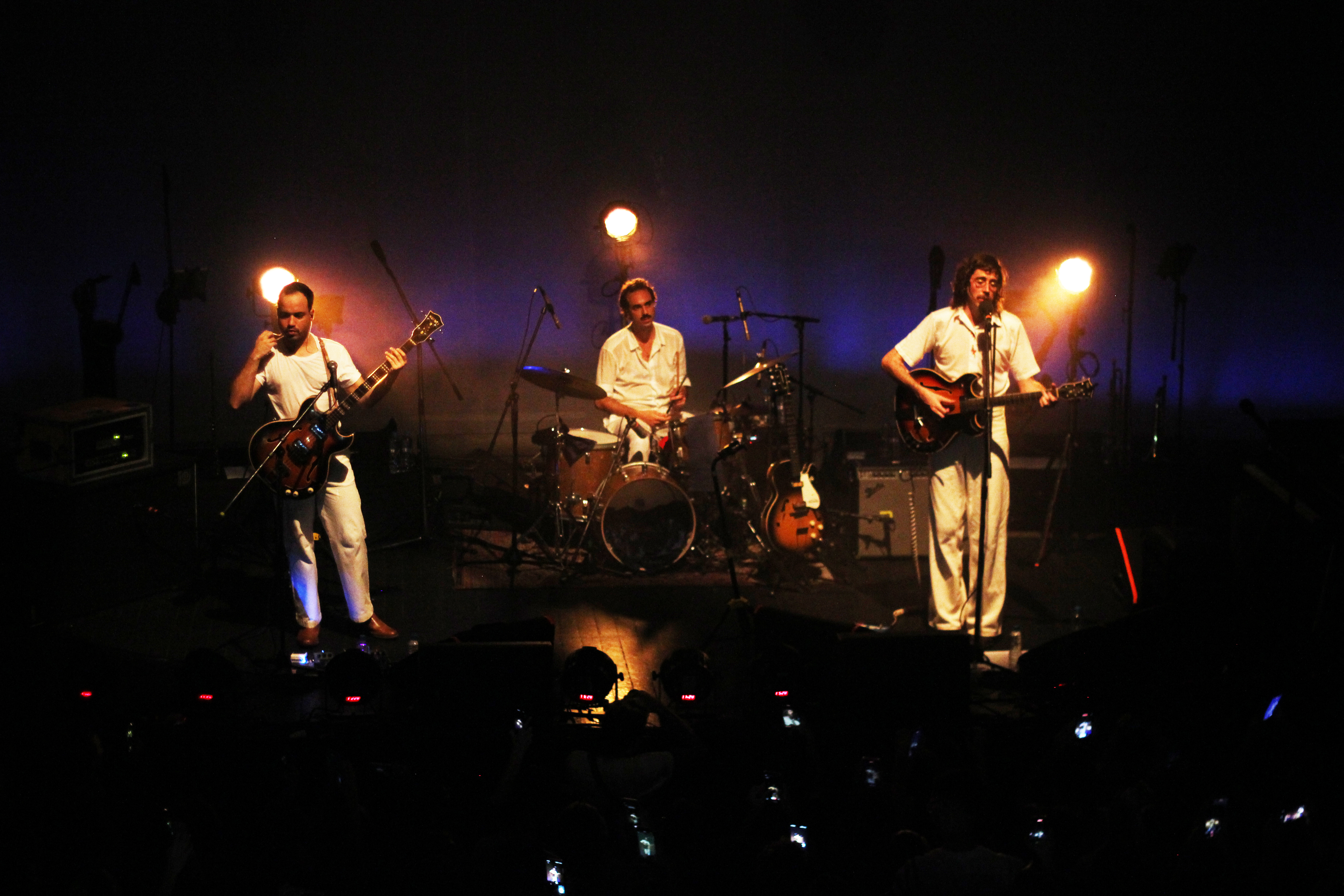
- O Terno performing at Circo Voador in 2024

Background information
- Origin: São Paulo, Brazil
- Genres: Garage rock; psychedelic rock; indie rock
- Years active: 2009–2024 (hiatus)
- Label: Selo RISCO
- Members: Tim Bernardes; Guilherme D'Almeida; Gabriel Basile
- Past members: Victor Chaves

O Terno (Portuguese pronunciation: [u ˈtɛʁnu], "The Suit") is a Brazilian rock band from São Paulo, consisting of singer-songwriter Tim Bernardes, bassist Guilherme D'Almeida and drummer Gabriel Basile. Formed in 2009, the trio began performing covers of songs by Os Mutantes, The Beatles and The Kinks before releasing original music. The band is considered a fixture of the contemporary Brazilian independent music scene, being one of the founders of the independent music label Selo RISCO. On 29 April 2024, the band announced an indefinite hiatus after their farewell show in Porto, Portugal, on 21 November.

== History ==
O Terno was formed by Tim Bernardes (vocals and guitar), Guilherme D'Almeida (bass) and Victor Chaves (drums). In June 2012, they independently released their first album, 66. Since its release, the album has been highly rated, being considered by the newspaper O Globo as "one of the most impressive debut albums of a Brazilian band" and ranked among the 25 best Brazilian albums of 2012 by the magazine Rolling Stone Brasil. The album contains five original songs and five songs written by Bernardes's father, Maurício Pereira, with arrangements by the trio.

The title track, 66, produced the band's first video, which was awarded in the category "Clipe do Ano" of the 2012 Multishow Brazilian Music Award. The band also won the Aposta MTV award at the 2012 MTV Video Music Brazil.

Also in 2012, O Terno performed as part of TV Cultura's year-end special, on the programme Cultura Livre. At the 2012 Multishow Brazilian Music Award, they performed with Nando Reis and Arnaldo Antunes. They also participated in the Som Brasil Tropicália series of Rede Globo.

In 2013, the trio recorded two songs for the EP of Tom Zé, Tribunal do Feicebuqui. The band also competed at the 2013 Multishow Brazilian Music Award in the category Melhor Canção with Harmonium, their EP TicTac-Harmonium. The EP featured three songs. A music video was produced for the track "Tic-Tac".

In 2014, they formed the collective music label selo RISCO, along with seven other bands, such as Charlie e os Marretas and Luiza Lian. In August of the same year, through crowdfunding website Projeto Catarse, the band released their self-titled second studio album, featuring twelve songs written by the band members themselves. The album was recorded at Estúdio Canoa and released independently.

In March 2015, the band changed its lineup: Gabriel Basile replaced Victor Chaves on drums. At the end of the same month, the band made their debut at the festival Lollapalooza.

In 2016, they participated in the production of the first selo RISCO compilation album, recording a cover of the song "Ávida Dúvida", by the band Memórias de um Caramujo. In addition, they released the video for Ai, Ai, Como Eu Me Iludo, produced by Alasca Filmes, the band's third. Between the end of May and the beginning of June 2016, O Terno made its first international tour, passing through Portugal and Spain (Primavera Sound), in festivals and solo performances spread across local cities. In September 2016, they released their third studio album, Melhor Do Que Parece, a fusion of Tropicália, rock, soul and música popular brasileira. The album was ranked first by O Estado de S. Paulo on its list of the 12 best Brazilian albums of 2016.

In 2019, the trio released <atrás/além>, their fourth studio album, on 23 April. The album featured international guest appearances by Devendra Banhart and Shintaro Sakamoto and was selected as one of the 25 best Brazilian albums of the first half of 2019 by the Associação Paulista de Críticos de Arte. Mauro Ferreira of G1 ranked the album 7th on his list of the 17 best Brazilian albums of 2019.

On 29 April 2024, the band announced they would be going on an indefinite hiatus after playing a few farewell shows. They performed their final Brazilian show at Coala Festival in São Paulo on 6 September 2024. They also performed two shows in Japan: on 2 November at the FESTIVAL de FRUE in Kakegawa, Shizuoka, and on 5 November in Tokyo. They performed their penultimate show at the Coliseu dos Recreios in Lisbon on 18 November, and their final show at the Coliseu do Porto in Porto on 21 November.

== Band members ==
Current members

- Martim Bernardes ("Tim") – vocals, guitar, piano
- Guilherme D'Almeida ("Peixe") – bass
- Gabriel Basile ("Biel") – drums

Former members

- Victor Chaves – drums

== Discography ==
=== Albums ===
- 66 (2012)
- O Terno (2014)
- Melhor Do Que Parece (2016)
- atrás/além (2019)

=== EPs ===
- TicTac-Harmonium (2013)

== Awards and nominations ==
Year	Organization	Work	Category	Result
2012	MTV Video Music Brazil	–	Aposta MTV	Won
2012	Multishow Brazilian Music Award	"66"	Music Video of the Year	Won
2013	Multishow Brazilian Music Award	"Harmonium"	New Music	Nominated
2014	Multishow Brazilian Music Award	O Terno	Best Album	Nominated
2014	Multishow Brazilian Music Award	–	Shared Music	Nominated
2015	Troféu APCA	"O Terno & Boogarins"	Show of the Year	Won
2016	Multishow Brazilian Music Award	"Ai, Ai, Como Eu Me Iludo"	Best Music Video	Won
2016	Multishow Brazilian Music Award	"Ai, Ai, Como Eu Me Iludo"	Best Direction for a Music Video	Nominated
2016	Multishow Brazilian Music Award	"Culpa"	Best Direction for a Music Video	Nominated
2016	Multishow Brazilian Music Award	"Culpa"	Best Photography for a Music Video	Nominated
2017	Multishow Brazilian Music Award	"Não Espero Mais"	Best Direction for a Music Video	Won
2020	Prêmio Dynamite	<atrás/além>	Best Indie Rock Release	Won
