= Jadsa =

- Born: Jadsa Castro Oliveira Costa; March 25, 1995 (age 31); Salvador, Bahia, Brazil
- Genres: MPB; experimental; rock
- Occupations: Singer; composer; songwriter; guitarist
- Years active: 2014–present

Jadsa Castro Oliveira Costa, known mononymously as Jadsa (Portuguese pronunciation: [ˈʒad.sɐ]), is a Brazilian singer and guitarist from Salvador, Bahia. Her music is inspired by the Vanguarda Paulista movement of São Paulo. She is openly lesbian.

== Early life ==
Jadsa Castro Oliveira Costa was born 25 March 1995 in Salvador, Bahia, and was raised in the Cabula neighborhood of the city. According to Jadsa, her given name was chosen after her mother suggested "Jordana" and her father and sister favored "Jade" before deciding at random. During her childhood, she was exposed to music through her parents, who listened to artists including Luiz Melodia, Gilberto Gil, and Jorge Ben Jor, as well as Afro-Brazilian and Afro-Bahian music. Jadsa began playing drums at the age of 11. She subsequently learned to play the guitar, cavaquinho, bass, and percussion.

By the time she was 13, she was playing guitar at concert venues in Salvador. During her teenage years, she participated in three rock bands concurrently, including one that performed covers of the Brazilian singer Pitty. She began writing songs by setting her original poems to music after her bands started performing her compositions during live shows. At her mother's encouragement, Jadsa became involved in theatre to address shyness and stage fright. In 2014, Jadsa began working with the Vila Velha Theater in Salvador, where she composed music for theatrical productions. There she met producer João Milet Meirelles, who became a frequent collaborator.

== Career ==
=== 2015–2020: Godê and early collaborations ===
Jadsa released her debut extended play (EP) Godê in 2015 and contains three tracks: "Nabeira", "Tudo Junto" e "Não Cabe em Nós". One of her bands, Monstra, was featured in the project, which she produced with Ronei Jorge and João Milet Meirelles of the collective Tropical Selvagem. Following the release, she performed with the band at local music festivals such as Radioca, Lado BA, and Festival Caymmi.

In 2018, she moved from Salvador to São Paulo to begin work on her debut studio album. During this period, she formed the backing band Power 7 to assist with arranging her music and to accompany her live performances. In 2019, she recorded new material for her album at Red Bull Studios in São Paulo, supported by the Natura Musical program. While preparing her debut album, in the middle of that year, Jadsa and Meirelles began collaborating on a parallel project named Taxidermia and released their first EP under this project, Vol. 1, in July 2020 through Balaclava Records. The release received a nomination as Breakthrough Artist from the São Paulo Art Critics Association (APCA).

=== 2021–2024: Olho de Vidro ===
Jadsa released her debut studio album Olho de Vidro on 26 March 2021 through Balaclava Records. The album features guest appearances by Kiko Dinucci, Ana Frango Elétrico, and Josyara. Although the album was scheduled for release in March 2020, she needed to postponed the release of the album following the outbreak of the COVID-19 pandemic, deciding that the album was not suited to the circumstances at the time. Musically, it is characterized as a blend of samba, rock, trip hop, reggae, and Vanguarda Paulista. Describing her own album as "almost the opposite of Taxidermia" and "organic", Jadsa cited the Vanguarda Paulista musician Itamar Assumpção as a major influence on Olho de Vidro and said she wrote the album with him in mind.

The album was highly praised by music critics upon its release. Music journalist Mauro Ferreira of G1 gave the album a positive review, highlighting its contemporary approach to Bahian music. The album received a 9.0/10 rating from Cleber Facchi of Música Instantânea, who praised Jadsa's lyrical creativity. He celebrated Olho de Vidro as "one of the most sensitive and conceptually diverse works of recent Brazilian music", ranking it 9th among the website's list of "The 50 Best Brazilian Albums of 2021".

=== 2025–present: Big Buraco ===
Jadsa's second studio album Big Buraco was released on 29 May 2025, through Risco. Música Instantânea ranked it as the best Brazilian album of 2025. On 21 March 2026, she performed at Lollapalooza Brasil, on the Budweiser stage. The edition featured 71 acts, both national and international, with headliners including Sabrina Carpenter, Tyler, the Creator, Lorde, Chappell Roan, Deftones, and Skrillex.

== Discography ==
Studio albums

- Olho de Vidro (2021)
- Big Buraco (2025)

Extended plays

- Godê (2015)

=== with Taxidermia ===
Studio albums

- Vera Cruz Island (2024)

Extended plays

- Vol. 1 (2020)
