= P9 (band) =

Brazilian musical group

- Origin: Rio de Janeiro, Brazil
- Genres: Pop
- Years active: 2012–15
- Labels: Sony Music Brazil
- Past members: Igor Von Adamovich; Jonathan Couto; Guilherme dos Santos; Michael Band
- Website: www.p9official.com

P9 were a Brazilian pop group formed in Rio de Janeiro, Brazil. The group members are Igor Von Adamovich, Jonathan Couto, Guilherme dos Santos, and Michael Band.

P9 are known for their hit singles, such as "My Favorite Girl." The first album titled P9, released in 2013.

== History ==
=== Background and training ===
Igor Von Adamovich had worked as an actor in the miniseries A Lonely Heart (2004). The influence of his mother lead him to learn the piano and later also started on the guitar.

Michael Band, of English, Belgian and German origin, began playing guitar at age 8, and in his youth had an indie rock band called Ob the Edge. He was born in Rio de Janeiro, and has lived in Mato Grosso do Sul and in Singapore, and stopped to business school to devote himself to music.

Jonathan Couto began learning to play the tambourine, then learned guitar and formed a samba band in fifth grade together with his classmates.

Guilherme dos Santos made a theater workshop hidden from their parents and acted in musicals.

The British producer Jason Herbert, currently living in Brazil and also a former member of the boy band Big Fun, decided in 2010 to develop a project to create a boy band internationally. A year later, he, with the help of American producer Venus Brown, got into contact with Igor and Michael, who were already known to them. With the help of Jason, Jonathan and William joined the band. Posto 9 was chosen by the band due to being considered one of the spot's most frequented by locals and tourists to Ipanema beach, where Igor and Michael often frequented.

=== 2013-present: P9 ===
The band's first single, "My Favorite Girl" was released on March 11, 2013 and became known for being part of the soundtrack of the telenovela Salve Jorge. In an interview, they said that they had received the news about their music being featured in Salve Jorge during their stay in the United States recording their debut album, through a message they received from WhatsApp when they were at a restaurant.

"My Favorite Girl"'s eponymous EP was released on iTunes Store on May 27, 2013 by Sony Music, containing four tracks, including "My Favorite Girl," two remixes made by Deeplick, and the song "Love You In Those Jeans". The music video for "My Favorite Girl" released on May 26, 2013 in twenty four hours broke the record views for a Brazilian band on YouTube at this time. The song reached #36 in the Parade Brazil Hot & Popular Pop and #40 on the Hot 100 Airplay Brazil. "Love You In Those Jeans" was released on June 18, 2013 as the second single from P9.

The self-titled debut album was recorded in the United States by Venus Brown and with the participation of Charlie Brown on percussion. It went on pre-sale on iTunes on June 18, 2013 and was launched on July 1, 2013. Months after, the song "Love You in Those Jeans" was added in the soundtrack of the telenovela Amor à Vida.

== Discography ==
Year	Album
2013	P9
