= Juçara Marçal =

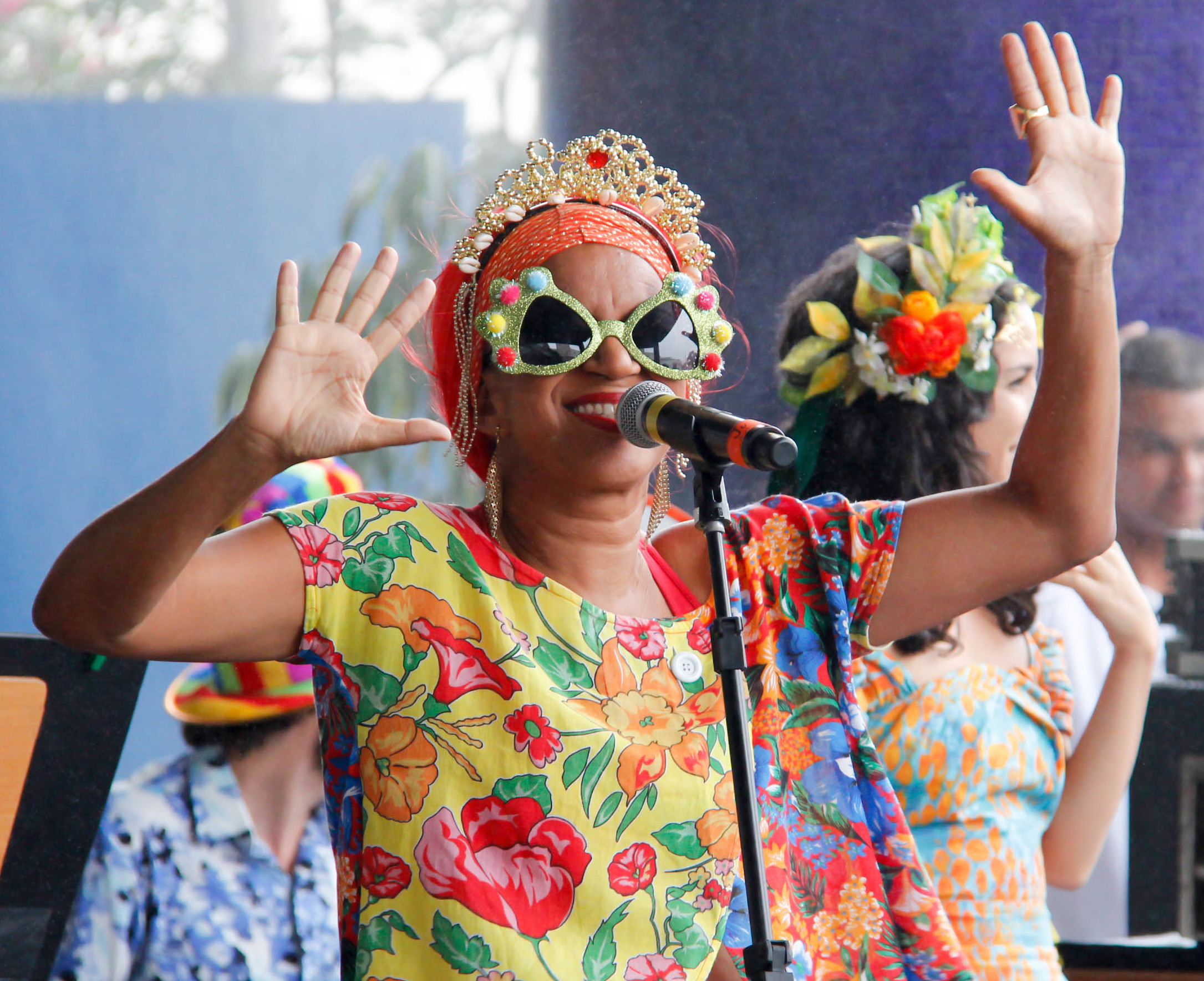

Background information
- Born: Juçara Marçal Nunes; January 27, 1962 (age 64); Duque de Caxias, Rio de Janeiro, Brazil

Juçara Marçal Nunes (born 27 January 1962) is a Brazilian singer and teacher, known by her work on the bands Vésper Vocal, A Barca and Metá Metá, as well as by her solo career.

== Life and career ==
Marçal began her artistic career in 1990 with the Companhia Coral, which fused music and theater under conductor Samuel Kerr. In 1991, she joined the female vocal group Vésper, which released three records: Flor D'Elis (1998), produced by André Magalhães, 180 anos de samba cantando Adoniran e Noel (2002) and Ser tão paulista (2004), by Magro Waghabi.

In 1998, she participated as a singer in the formation of the band A Barca, which released four albums: Turista aprendiz (2000), Baião de princesas (2002), Trilha, toada e trupe (2006) and Turista aprendiz (2010). She graduated in journalism and literature from the University of São Paulo, where she defended in 2000 her master's thesis on the writer Pedro Nava. She taught singing in the superior course of theater at Anhembi Morumbi University and held workshops for groups. She is also a Portuguese language teacher.

In 2008, besides the albums recorded with bands, Marçal also released in partnership with Kiko Dinucci the album Padê. In 2011, 2012 and 2016, she released three albums with the trio Metá Metá (with Dinucci and Thiago França). In early 2014, she released her first solo album, Encarnado, which gained critical acclaim and the award for Shared Music, by specialized jury, at Prêmio Multishow, received by Criolo.

In October, she re-recorded two songs by Isaura Garcia for the special "Cantoras do Brasil", on Canal Brasil. In November, her participation with Criolo in the song Fio de Prumo (Padê Onã), from the album Convoque seu Buda, was released. In 2021, Juçara released her third solo work, Delta Estácio Blues, and was awarded in the categories of best album and best song of the year at Prêmio Multishow.

== Discography ==
- 2008 - Padê (with Kiko Dinucci)
- 2014 - Encarnado
- 2015 - Anganga (with Cadu Tenório)
- 2021 - Delta Estácio Blues
