= Roberta Campos =

Brazilian singer-songwriter (born 1977)

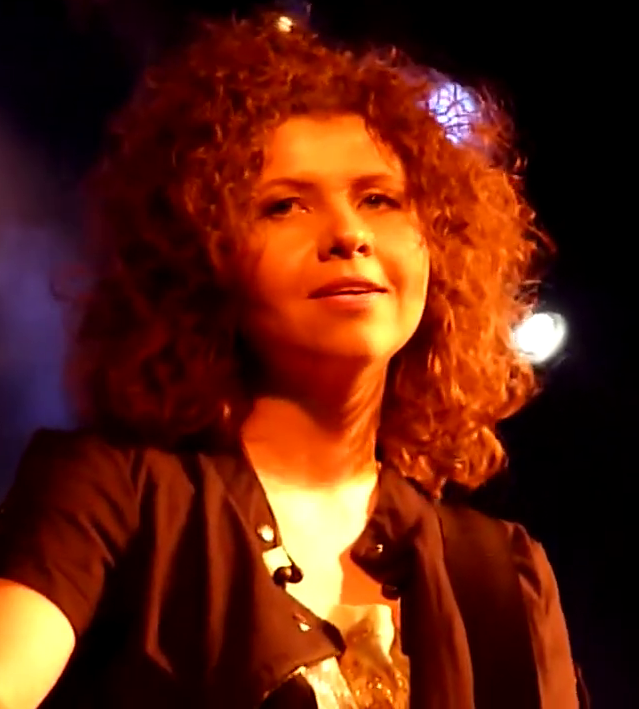
- Campos in 2011
- Born: Roberta Cristina Campos Martins; 19 December 1977 (age 48); Caetanópolis, Minas Gerais, Brazil
- Occupation: singer
- Years active: 2008–present
- Musical career
- Genres: MPB, Folk-pop

Roberta Cristina Campos Martins (born 19 December 1977) is a Brazilian singer-songwriter.

== Life and career ==
Born in Caetanópolis, Minas Gerais, Campos got her first guitar when she was 11 years old, and at 18 she formed her first band, Alpha Band, followed shortly later by another band, Pop Troti. In 2008, she self-produced her first album, Para aquelas perguntas tortas, which through Myspace got her a significant fanbase.

Put under contract by Deckdisc, in 2010 she released her second album, Varrendo a lua, which featured collaborations with Nando Reis, Lô Borges and Nô Stopa, among others. Her 2015 album Todo Caminho é Sorte was nominated for the Latin Grammy Award for Best MPB Album. In 2024, she launched the project 4Mãos together with Kid Abelha founding member George Israel.

=== Personal life ===
Campos is a lesbian and is married to her music manager Marina Souza Campos.

== Discography ==
Albums

- Para Aquelas Perguntas Tortas (2008)
- Varrendo a Lua (2010)
- Diário de Um Dia (2012)
- Maior que o Mundo (2014)
- Todo Caminho é Sorte (2015)
- Só Conheço o Mar (2020)
- O Amor Liberta (2021)
- Lato A (2024, EP, with George Israel)
- Coisas de Viver (2025)
