= Vitor Kley =

Brazilian singer-songwriter

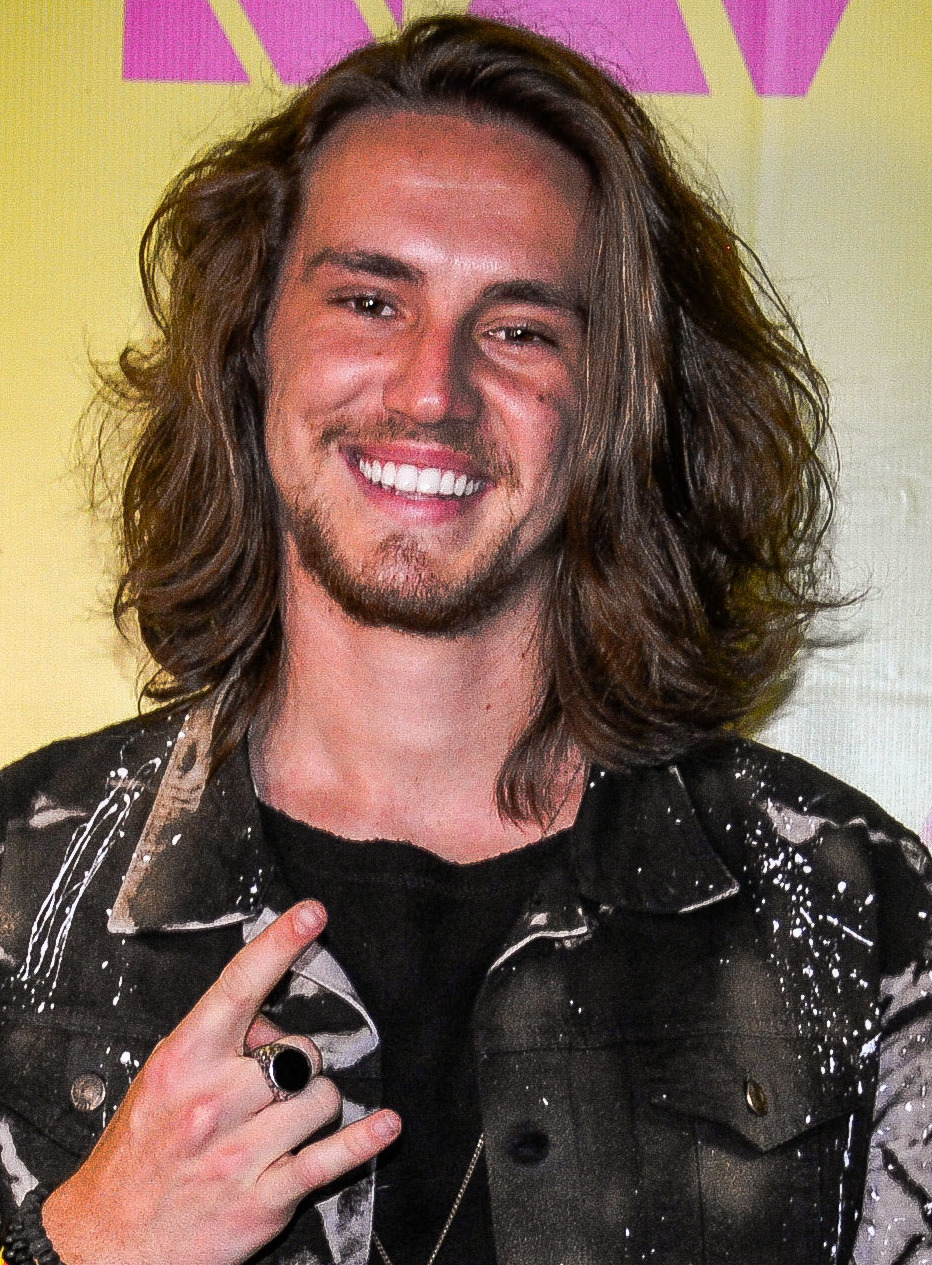
- Kley in 2019

Background information
- Born: August 18, 1994 (age 31); Porto Alegre
- Genres: Pop music
- Occupation: Singer-songwriter
- Instrument: Acoustic guitar
- Years active: 2009–present
- Labels: Midas Music
- Website: vitorkley.com.br

Vitor Barbiero Kley (born August 18, 1994) is a Brazilian singer-songwriter, best known for his song "O Sol". He received two nominations at the Latin Grammy Awards.

== Career ==
Vitor Barbiero Kley was born in Porto Alegre, on August 18, 1994. His father is Ivan Kley, former professional tennis player, and his mother is Janice Barbiero, a teacher and visual artist. He learned to play acoustic guitar when he was 9 years old from his mother, and started composing when he was 10. Kley recorded his first album when he was 13 years old. His first two albums were released independently: Eclipse Solar in 2009 and Luz a Brilhar in 2012. In 2015, he signed with Midas Music, a record label by producer Rick Bonadio, and released a self-titled EP the next year. In October 2017, he released "O Sol", which became a national success and one of the most played songs in Brazil. In September 2018, he released his third studio album, Adrenalizou. In July 2019, he released "Pupila" with duo Anavitória, which received a triple diamond certification by Pro-Música Brasil. On September 5 the same year, Kley released "A Tal Canção pra Lua" featuring Samuel Rosa, a single from his fourth studio album, Microfonado, released a week later. In 2020, the song received a nomination at the 21st Annual Latin Grammy Awards for Best Portuguese Language Song.

In June 2020, Kley released his fifth studio album A Bolha. It received a nomination at the 22nd Annual Latin Grammy Awards for Best Portuguese Language Contemporary Pop Album.

== Discography ==
- Eclipse Solar (2009)
- Luz a Brilhar (2012)
- Adrenalizou (2018)
- Microfonado (2019)
- A Bolha (2020)
