= Bonde das Maravilhas =

Brailizan funk carioca group

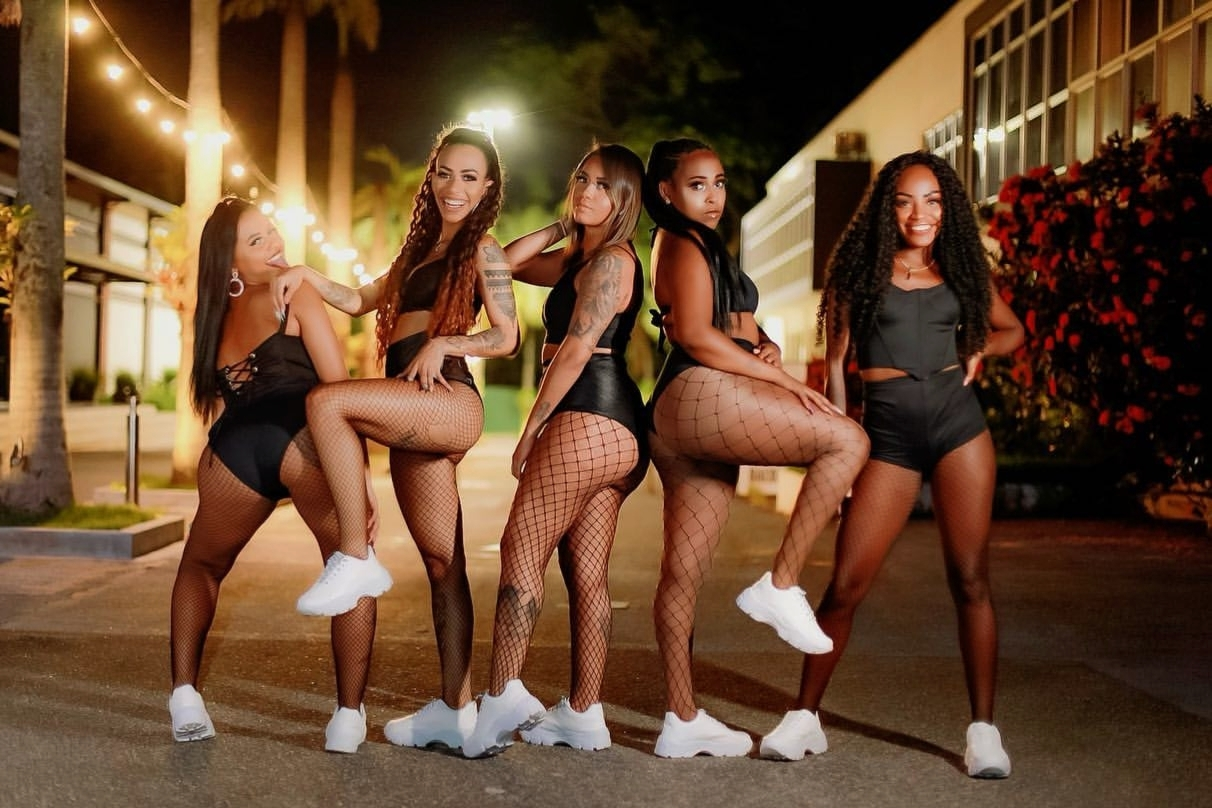
- The group in January 2022

Background information
- Origin: Rio de Janeiro, Brazil
- Genres: Funk carioca
- Years active: 2011–present
- Past members: Thaysa Maravilha Karol Maravilha Rafaela Gaaby Silva "Nneca" Renatinha Kathy Maravilha Joyce Thalia Thammy Laryssa

Bonde das Maravilhas is a Brazilian group of funk carioca created in 2011 in Niterói. The group achieved recognition mainly with the song "Quadradinho de Oito" also called "Aquecimento das Maravilhas".

== History ==
In mid-2011, six teenagers (Karoline, Thaysa, Gaaby, Rafaela, Joyce and Thalia) from the Complexo do Serrão community in Niterói, Rio de Janeiro, created a dance group dedicated to homemade videos of funk carioca uploaded to the YouTube platform. Shortly after the announcements, the group gained local notoriety for daring choreography and partnerships with funk artists from the region. The so-called "Bonde das Maravilhas."

As time went by, the group achieved international fame, thus managing to tour Europe (Switzerland, Italy, France, Portugal), Africa (Angola) and parts of the Caribbean (Suriname, French Guyana).

== Singles ==
Title	Year	Dance moves	Views on YT
"Aquecimento das Maravilhas (Quadradinho de Oito)"	2013	"Cola a Bunda no Chão", "Bumbum Girando", "Deslizando" and "Quadradinho de Oito"	196 000 000 +
"Movimento das Maravilhas" ("Quadradinho de Borboleta")	2013	"Quadradinho de Borboleta", "Passinho do Bate-Bate" and "Passinho do Abre e Fecha"	45 000 000 +
"Efeito Dominó"	2014	"Efeito Dominó"	8 300 000 +
"Te Taco o Taco"	2015	"Quadradinho", "Espaguete" and "Tremidinha"	30 000 000 +
"Novo Movimento"	2015	"Novo Movimento"	36 118 000 +
"Evolução das Maravilhas"	2016	"Tipo Roda-Gigante", "Cintura de Mola" and "Quadradinho de Dezesseis"	9 400 000 +
"Eu adoro eu me amarro" ("Brincadeira das maravilhas")	2012	"Quadradinho de quatro", "Espacate"	25 000 000 +
"Senta vai Senta" (É o mundo se acabando)	2011	"Senta vai Senta"	2 100 000 +
