= Mahmundi =

Brazilian singer-songwriter (born 1987)

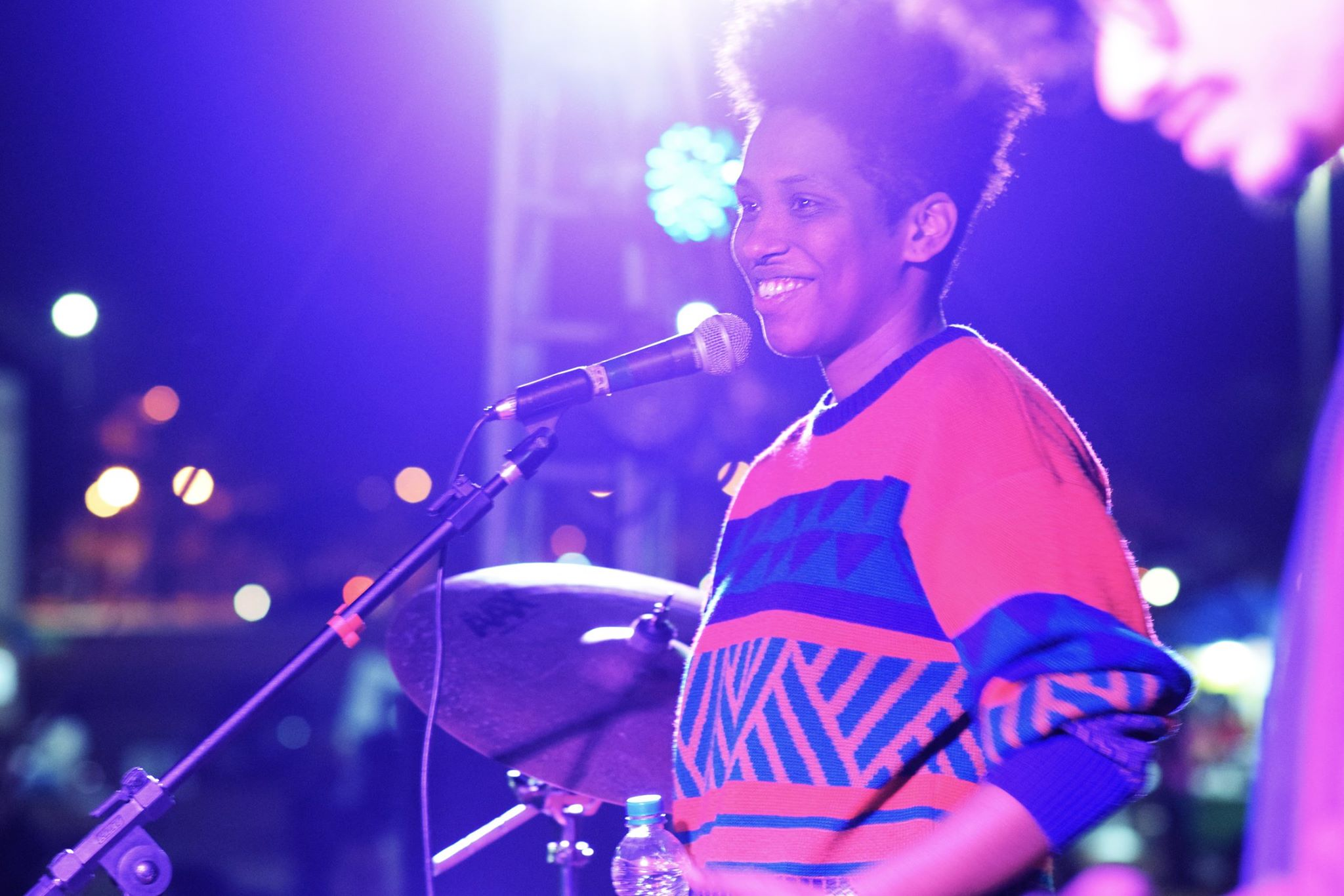
- Mahmundi in 2016
- Born: Marcela Vale Pinheiro; 29 July 1987 (age 38); Rio de Janeiro, Brazil
- Occupation: Singer
- Years active: 2017–present
- Musical career
- Genres: MPB

Marcela Vale Pinheiro (born 29 July 1987), known professionally as Mahmundi, is a Brazilian singer and songwriter.

== Career ==
Before starting her solo career, Mahmundi was the lead vocalist, guitarist, and songwriter of the band Velho Irlandês. She left the group in October 2010. She also worked as an audio technician at Circo Voador, as a way of developing her musical skills.

Mahmundi started working on her solo project in January 2012. In March 2012, she released the EP Efeito das Cores, produced in collaboration with Lucas de Paiva and featuring Felipe Vellozo on bass. In 2013, anticipated by the single "Vem {Selah}", she released her second EP, Setembro.

In 2013, Mahmundi won the Multishow Brazilian Music Award for Hit of the Year with "Calor do Amor". In 2014, she won a second Multishow Award in the "New Song (Super Jury)" category with the song "Sentimento". In 2016, she released her first album, Mahmundi. In 2019, she was nominated for the Latin Grammy Award in the category Best Portuguese Language Contemporary Pop Album for the album Para Dias Ruins. Her album Amor Fati was selected by the São Paulo Art Critics Association as one of the 50 best Brazilian albums of 2023.

== Discography ==
Albums

- 2012: Efeito das Cores (EP)
- 2013: Setembro (EP)
- 2016: Mahmundi
- 2018: Para Dias Ruins
- 2020: Mundo Novo
- 2023: Amor Fati
