= Ava Rocha =

Brazilian singer-songwriter (born 1979)

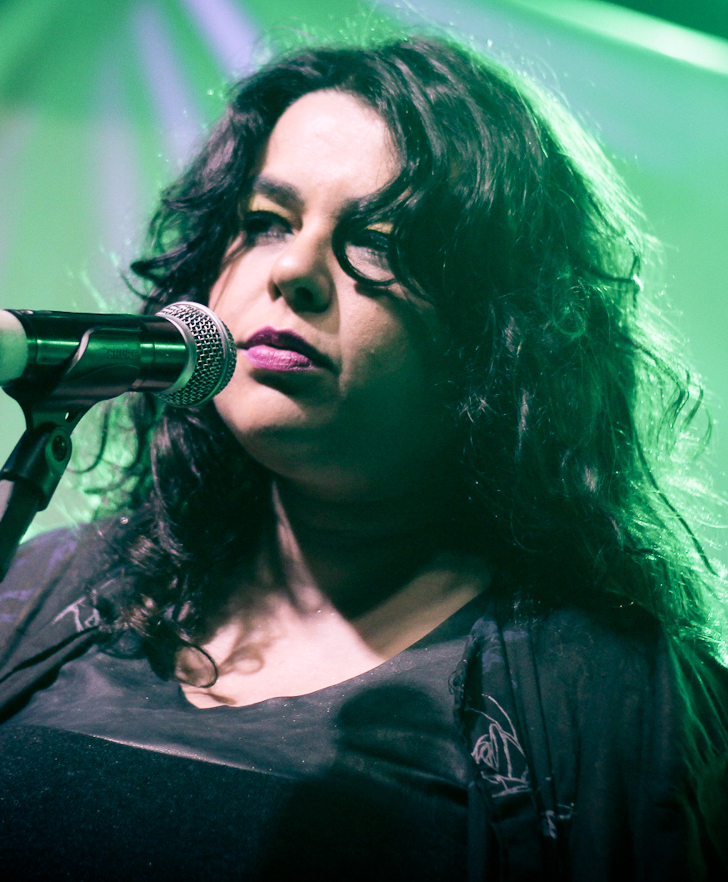
- Rocha in 2012
- Born: Ava Patrya Yndia Yracema Gaitan Rocha; 21 March 1979 (age 47); Rio de Janeiro, Brazil
- Occupation: Singer-songwriter
- Years active: 2006–present
- Musical career
- Genres: MPB, indie

Ava Patrya Yndia Yracema Gaitan Rocha (born 21 March 1979) is a Brazilian singer-songwriter.

== Biography ==
Born in Rio de Janeiro, the daughter of the director Glauber and the visual artist Paula Gaitán, Rocha started her career in theatre, with the stage company Teatro Oficina in São Paulo with whom she made her debut as an actress in 2006. She began her musical career in 2008 with a band bearing her name, "AVA", with whom she released her first album in 2011.

In 2015, she recorded her first solo album, Ava Patrya Yndia Yracema, thanks to which she won the Multishow Brazilian Music Award as the revelation artist of the year and the Prêmio APCA of the Associação Paulista de Críticos de Arte in the same category. The album was also included in the list of the best albums of 2015, published by The New York Times. In 2018, she released her second album, Trança, launched by the single "Joana Dark".

She is married to Negro Leo, author of several songs for Rocha including the single Você Não Vai Passar, winner in 2015 of the Multishow Award in the category "Novo Hit".

Her album Nektar was chosen by the Associação Paulista de Críticos de Arte as one of the 50 best Brazilian albums of 2023.

== Discography ==
=== Studio albums ===
- Diurno (2011)
- Ava Patrya Yndia Yracema (2015)
- Trança (2018)
- Néktar (2023)
