= Lucas Santtana =

Brazilian singer (born 1970)

- Born: Lucas Mascarenhas Santana; October 18, 1970 (age 55); Salvador
- Origin: Brazil
- Genres: Electro-acoustic
- Occupations: Singer; Composer producer
- Instruments: Vocals; Bass; Guitar; Cavaquinho
- Labels: Diginois Records; No Format!
- Website: Lucas Santtana on facebook

Lucas Mascarenhas Santana (born October 18, 1970), known as his stage name Lucas Santtana, is a Brazilian singer, composer and producer from Salvador, Bahia, Brazil. In his CD, Sem Nostalgia (YB Music, 2009), he recreates the Brazilian guitar tradition, mixing up sounds from the 1950s, like João Gilberto and Dorival Caymmi, with mashups, samples and his own creations.

His album O Céu É Velho Há Muito Tempo was considered one of the 25 best Brazilian albums of the second half of 2019 by the São Paulo Association of Art Critics (APCA). APCA also chose his album O Paraíso as one of the 50 best Brazilian albums of 2023.
