= Metá Metá =

Brazilian MPB band from São Paulo

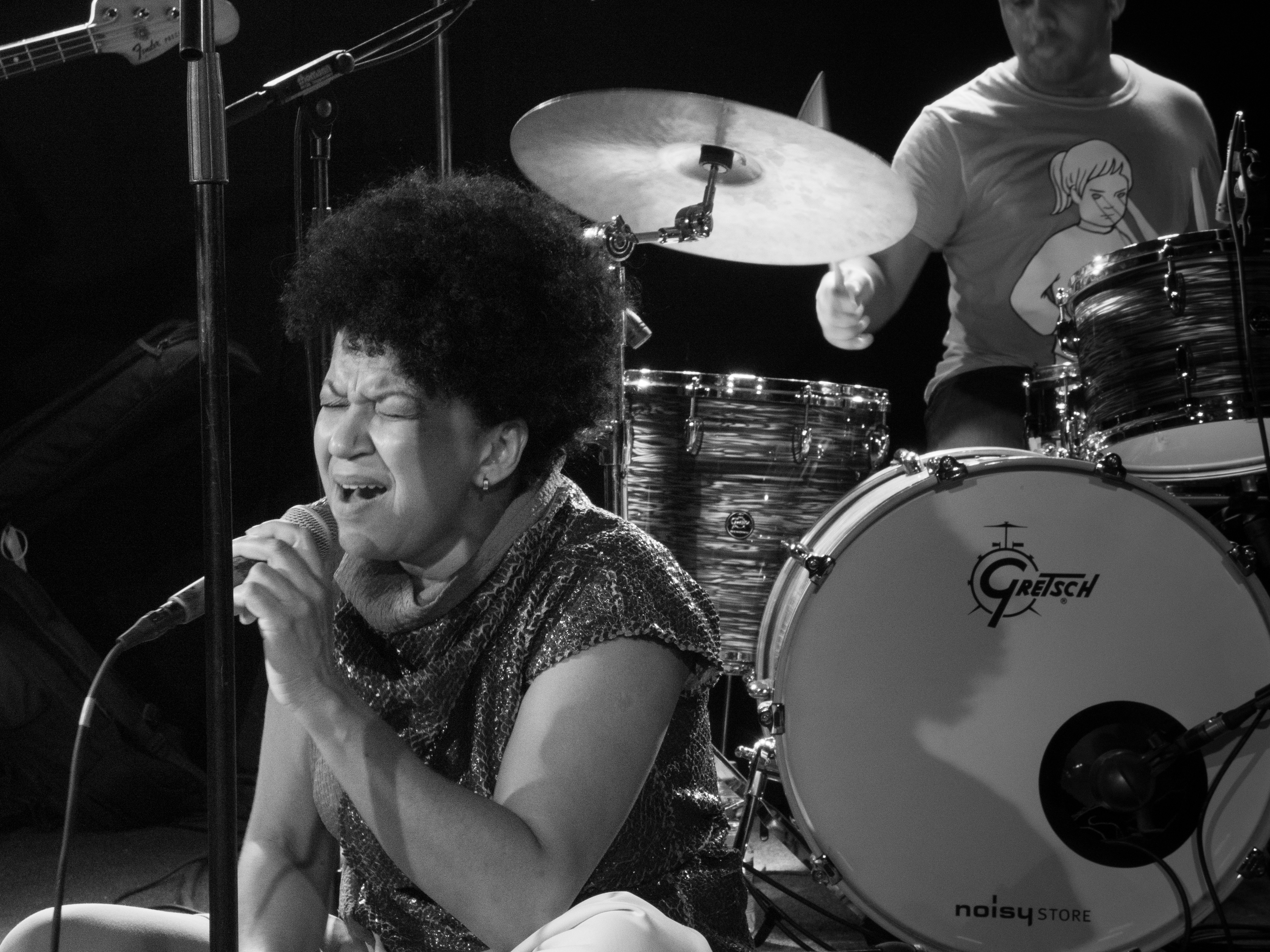

Background information
- Origin: São Paulo
- Genres: Jazz, samba, MPB
- Years active: 2008-present
- Members: Juçara Marçal; Kiko Dinucci; Thiago França
- Website: www.metametaoficial.com.br

Metá Metá is a Brazilian jazz band from São Paulo created in 2008 and formed by the trio Juçara Marçal (vocals), Kiko Dinucci (guitar) and Thiago França (saxophone).

It is considered one of the most prestigious and representative groups of the recent Brazilian music scene. The band name means "three in one" in Yoruba and the trio works with the diversity of Brazilian musical genres, fusing jazz, rock, samba and Candomblé rhythms using economic arrangements that emphasize melodic elements and signs of African-influenced music in the world.

Their second album, MetaL MetaL, was nominated in 2013 at the Multishow Brazilian Music Awards for Best Album, Version of the Year and Shared Music categories, winning the latter. In 2015, the group was again awarded the Version of the Year award at the 2015 Multishow Brazilian Music Award.

In 2015 the show Clube da Encruza, which he presented alongside the band Passo Torto at Sala Funarte Sidney Miller in Rio de Janeiro, was elected by critics from the newspaper O Globo as one of the ten best shows of 2015.

In 2016, Rolling Stone Brasil magazine elected the band's third album MM3 as the 7th best album of the year.

In 2017 the group developed the soundtrack for the show Gira by Grupo Corpo, honoring the orisha Eshu. Two tracks that were excluded from the show were released in EP format.

In 2017, Mm3 was nominated for the Latin Grammy Award for Best Portuguese Language Rock or Alternative Album.

== Discography ==
EPs

- Alakorô (2013)
- EP (2015)
- EP 3 (2017)

Studio albums

- Metá Metá (2011)
- MetaL MetaL (2012)
- MM3 (2016)
- Gira (Trilha Sonora Original do Espetáculo do Grupo Corpo) (2017)
