= Silva (musician) =

Brazilian singer, songwriter, and multi-instrumentalist

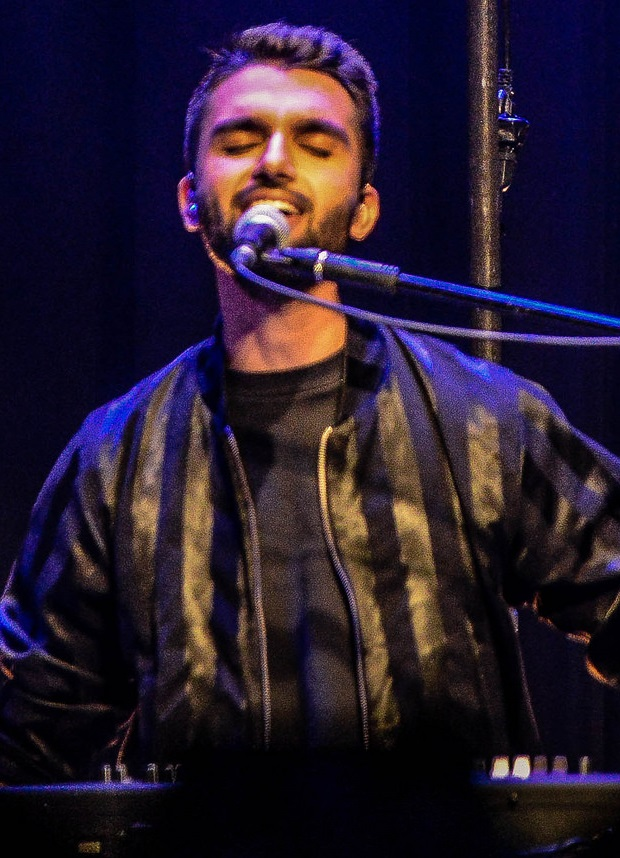
- Silva in concert, 2017

Background information
- Born: Lúcio Silva de Souza; 3 July 1988 (age 37); Vitória, Espírito Santo, Brazil
- Genres: Música popular brasileira, indie pop
- Occupation: singer-songwriter
- Years active: 2012–present
- Website: www.silva.tv

Lúcio Silva de Souza (born 3 July 1988), known simply as Silva, stylized as "SILVA", is a Brazilian singer, songwriter, and multi-instrumentalist.

== Career ==
Silva released his first album "Claridão" on the Som Livre label in 2012. In 2014 he released "Vista pro mar," followed by "Júpiter" in 2015, "Silva canta Marisa" in 2016, and "Brasileiro" in 2018. Silva has toured Brazil for each of his five albums and collaborated with Anitta, Fernanda Takai, Marisa Monte, Ivete Sangalo, Lulu Santos, and Ludmilla.

== Discography ==
- Claridão (2012)
- Vista pro mar (2014)
- Júpiter (2015)
- Silva canta Marisa (2016)
- Brasileiro (2018)
- Cinco (2020)
- Encantado (2024)
- Hémisphère (2025)
- Rolidei (2026)

== Recognition ==
Rolling Stone Brasil named the album "Vista pro mar" as No. 8 in its list of the best Brazilian albums of 2014 and in 2018 "Brasileiro" was ranked No. 22. The latter was also elected among the 25 best Brazilian albums of the first half of 2018 by the São Paulo Association of Art Critics.

== Personal life ==
Silva is openly gay and was in a relationship with Fernando Sotele from 2016 to 2019.
