= Kiko Dinucci =

Brazilian singer-songwriter

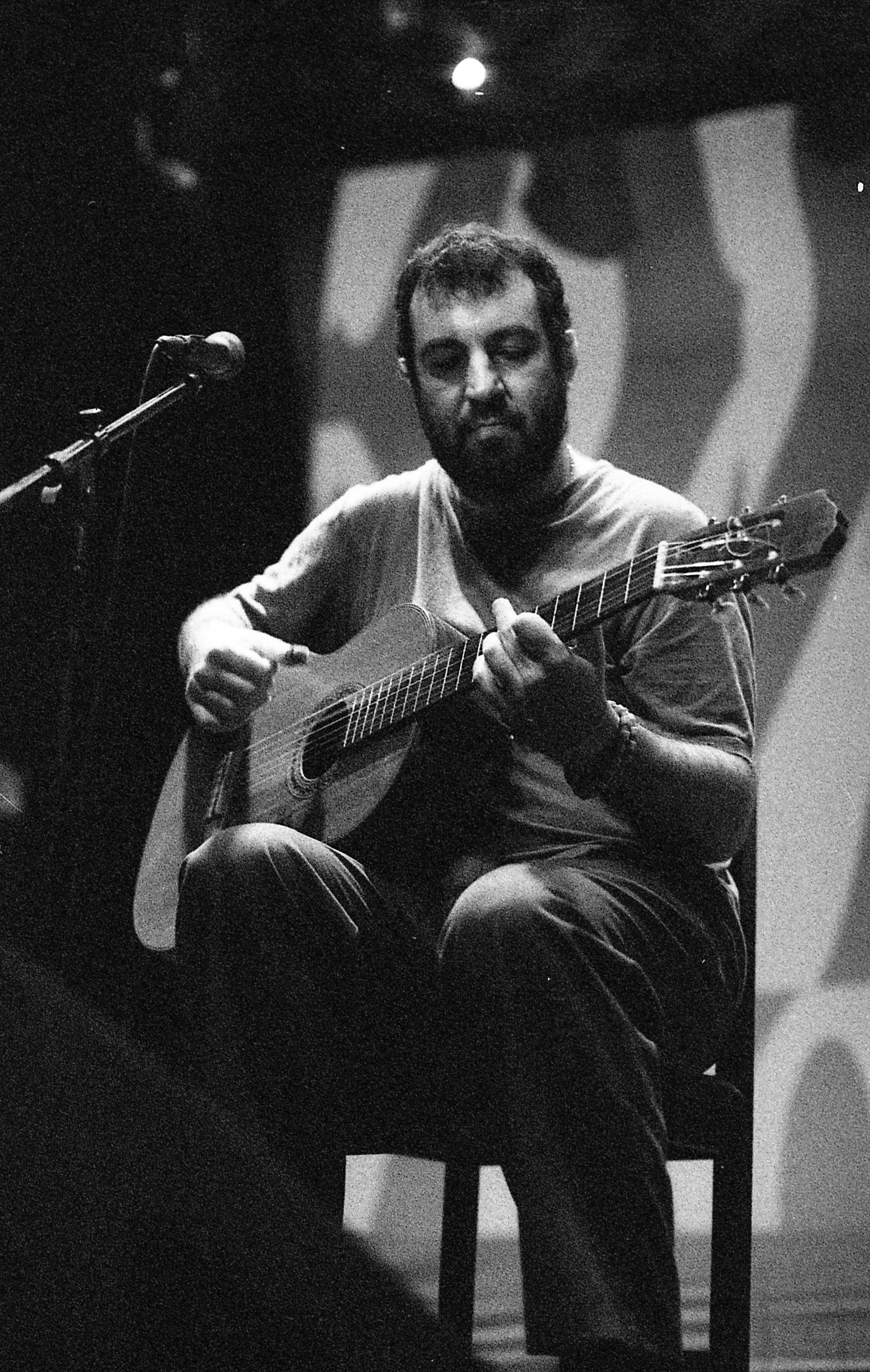
- Dinucci in concert at Circo Voador (2022)
- Born: Cristiano Dinucci; 5 July 1977 (age 48); São Paulo, Brazil
- Occupation: singer-songwriter
- Years active: 1993–present
- Musical career
- Genres: MPB, samba, punk

Cristiano "Kiko" Dinucci (born 5 July 1977) is a Brazilian singer-songwriter.

== Career ==
Born in São Paulo, Dinucci grew up in Guarulhos, where he was a member of several rock bands, including Personal Choice in the 1990s. In 2007, he began his career as a songwriter, penning eight songs for the album Padê, which he recorded with Juçara Marçal. In 2008, he released the samba-punk album Pastiche Nagô with Bando Afromacarrônico.

In 2011, he co-founded two groups: Metá Metá, together with Juçara Marçal and Thiago França, and Passo Torto, with Romulo Fróes, Rodrigo Campos and Marcelo Cabral, later joined by Ná Ozzetti.

His inaugural solo album, Cortes Curtos, was released in 2017. Comprising 15 brief tracks that chronicle stories within the city of São Paulo, the album delves into the sound of samba sujo, heavily influenced by rock, punk, and post-punk. The album was voted the 21st best Brazilian album of 2017 by Rolling Stone Brasil magazine.

== Discography ==
- 2007 - Padê (with Juçara Marçal)
- 2008 - Pastiche Nagô (with Bando Afromacarrônico)
- 2009 - O Retrato Do Artista Quando Pede (as Duo Moviola, with Douglas Germano)
- 2010 - Na Boca Dos Outros
- 2011 - Passo Torto (with Romulo Fróes, Rodrigo Campos e Marcelo Cabral)
- 2011 - Metá Metá (with Juçara Marçal e Thiago França)
- 2012 - MetaL MetaL (with Juçara Marçal e Thiago França)
- 2013 - Passo Elétrico (with Romulo Fróes, Rodrigo Campos e Marcelo Cabral)
- 2013 - Thiago França (with Rômulo Fróes, Rodrigo Campos, Marcelo Cabral and Ná Ozzetti)
- 2016 - MM3 (with Juçara Marçal e Thiago França)
- 2017 - Cortes Curtos
- 2020 - Rastilho
