= List of awards and nominations received by Anitta =

Anitta awards and nominations
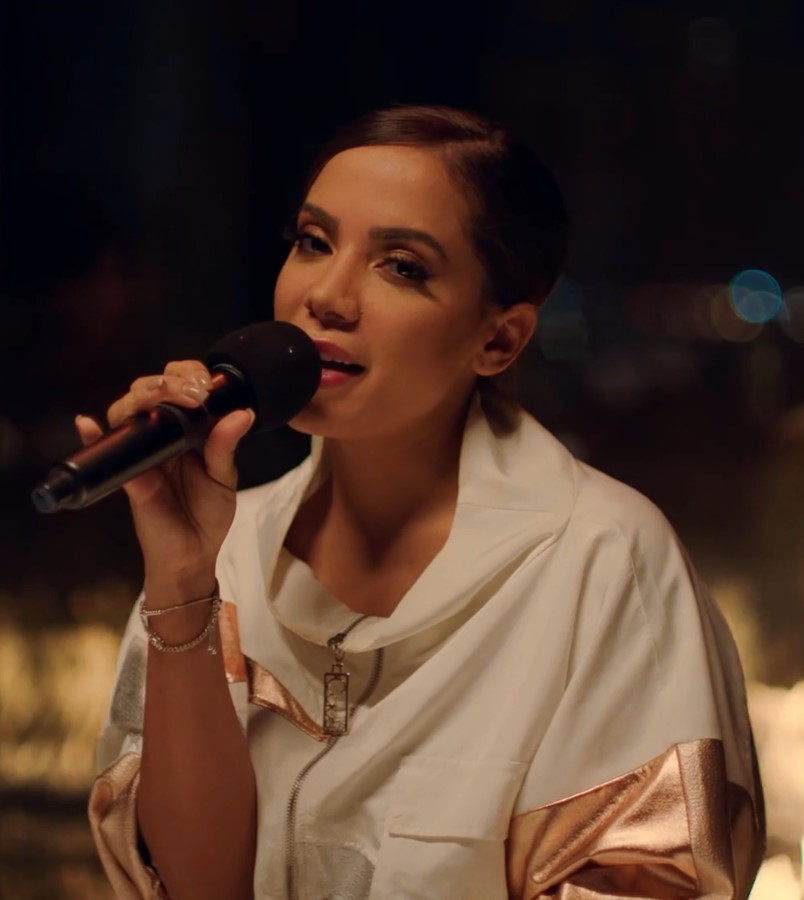
- Anitta in 2019.
Awards and nominations
Award	Wins	Nominations
Brazilian Music Awards	1	4
Billboard Latin Music Awards	0	3
Latin American Music Awards	4	8
Latin Grammy Awards	1	12
Melhores do Ano	4	7
MTV Europe Music Awards	9	17
MTV Video Music Awards	3	5
Multishow Brazilian Music Award	23	60
Grammy Awards	0	2

Totals (Note: Certain award groups do not simply award one winner. They acknowledge several different recipients, have runners-up, and have third place. Since this is a specific recognition and is different from losing an award, runner-up mentions are considered wins in this award tally. For simplification and to avoid errors, each award in this list has been presumed to have had a prior nomination.)
- Wins: 335
- Nominations: 838

Anitta is a Brazilian singer and songwriter. She has received several awards and nominations, including one Latin Grammy Award, four Latin American Music Awards, eight MTV Europe Music Awards, three MTV Video Music Award, and two Grammy Awards nominations. She has also received various Brazilian awards such as one Brazilian Music Awards, four Melhores do Ano, twenty three Multishow Brazilian Music Awards, eight Meus Prêmios Nick and nine MTV Millennial Awards Brazil.

She rose to national fame with the release of her single "Show das Poderosas" in 2013, for which she received two Multishow Brazilian Music Awards, including Video of the Year. In the following years she released three studio albums, Anitta in 2013, Ritmo Perfeito in 2014 and Bang! in 2015. In 2014, she received her first Latin Grammy nomination for Best Brazilian Song for "Zen", the same year the won her first MTV Europe Music Award for Best Brazilian Act, her first of five consecutive wins in the category.

Between 2016 and 2019, she collaborated with several Latin American and American artists, releasing songs both in Spanish and Portuguese, including "Downtown" with Colombian singer J. Balvin, which was nominated for the Latin Grammy Award for Best Urban Song in 2018 and "R.I.P." with Mexican singer Sofia Reyes and British singer Rita Ora, which won a Premio Lo Nuestro and a Latin American Music Award.

In 2019, she released her fourth studio album Kisses, receiving a nomination for the Latin Grammy Award for Best Urban Music Album. In 2022, she released her fifth album Versions of Me, the album was commercially successful and included the single "Envolver", Anitta's most successful single, garnering a Guinness World Record for being the first solo Latin artist to reach No.1 on Spotify. Additionally, the song won Best Latin at the 2022 MTV Video Music Awards, making her the first Brazilian artist to win a VMA.

== Awards and nominations ==
Award	Year	Recipient(s) and nominee(s)	Category	Result	Ref.
All Africa Music Awards	2022	Anitta	Best Global Act	Won	
American Music Awards	2022	Anitta	Favorite Female Latin Artist	Won	
APCA Trophy	2013	Anitta	Revelation singer	Won	
APCA Trophy	2017	Anitta	Artist of the Year	Nominated	
Área VIP Award	2018	"Vai Malandra" (with MC Zaac, Maejor, Tropkillaz and DJ Yuri Martins)	Hit of the Year	Nominated	
Área VIP Award	2018	Anitta	Best Singer	Nominated	
Área VIP Award	2018	Anitta	VIP of the Year	Nominated	
Área VIP Award	2019	Anitta	VIP of the Year	Won	
Área VIP Award	2019	Anitta	Best Singer	Won	
Área VIP Award	2020	Anitta	Best Singer	Nominated	
Área VIP Award	2020	Anitta	VIP of the Year	Nominated	
Área VIP Award	2021	Anitta	VIP of the Year	Nominated	
Área VIP Award	2021	Anitta	Best Singer	Nominated	
Área VIP Award	2022	Anitta	Best Singer	Nominated	
Área VIP Award	2022	Anitta	VIP of the Year	Nominated	
Área VIP Award	2022	"Envolver"	Hit of the Year	Nominated	
ASCAP Award	2019	"Machika" (with J Balvin and Jeon)	Winning Song	Won	
Asian Pop Music Awards	2023	"Back for More" (with Tomorrow X Together)	Best Collaboration	Nominated	
Asian Pop Music Awards	2023	"Back for More" (with Tomorrow X Together)	Best Producer	Nominated	
Band Folia Trophy	2020	"Contatinho"	Carnival Music	Nominated	
Best of the Year Amazon Music	2022	Anitta	Best of 2022 - POP	Won	
Billboard Latin Music Awards	2019	Anitta	Social Artist of the Year	Nominated	
Billboard Latin Music Awards	2022	Anitta	Hot Latin Songs Artist of the Year, Female	Nominated	
Billboard Latin Music Awards	2024	Anitta	Hot Latin Songs Artist of the Year, Female	Nominated	
Billboard Latin Woman in Music	2025	Anitta	Vanguard Award	Honored	
BMI Latin Awards	2026	"Bellakeo" (with Peso Pluma)	Songwriters & Publishers of the Most-Performed Songs of the Year	Honored	
Brazilian Music Awards	2023	Versions of Me	Release in a Foreign Language	Nominated	
Brazilian Music Awards	2023	"Tropa"	Audiovisual Project	Nominated	
Brazilian Music Awards	2024	Funk Generation: A Favela Love Story	Release in a Foreign Language	Won	
Brazilian Music Awards	2025	Funk Generation	Release in a Foreign Language	Nominated	
Cariocas do Ano Awards	2016	Anitta	Singer of the Year	Won	
Cariocas do Ano Awards	2022	Anitta	Carioca of the Year	Won	
CarnaUOL Trophy	2019	"Bola Rebola" (with J Balvin and Tropkillaz)	Summer Hit at Carnival	Nominated	
CarnaUOL Trophy	2019	"Terremoto" (with Kevinho)	Summer Hit at Carnival	Nominated	
Capricho Awards	2014	"Cobertor"	Best National Clip	Nominated	
Capricho Awards	2014	Anitta	Best National Singer	Nominated	
Capricho Awards	2015	Anitta	Best National Singer	Won	
Capricho Awards	2015	"Deixa Ele Sofrer"	Best National Clip	Won	
Capricho Awards	2015	"Deixa Ele Sofrer"	National Hit	Nominated	
Capricho Awards	2016	"Sim ou Não" (featuring Maluma)	National Hit	Won	
Capricho Awards	2016	"Sim ou Não" (featuring Maluma)	Best National Clip	Nominated	
Capricho Awards	2016	Anitta	Best National Style	Nominated	
Capricho Awards	2016	Anitta	Best National Singer	Won	
Capricho Awards	2017	Anitta	National Artist	Won	
Capricho Awards	2017	Anitta	National Crush	Nominated	
Capricho Awards	2017	Anitta	National Fashionista	Nominated	
Capricho Awards	2017	"Vai Malandra" (with MC Zaac, Maejor, Tropkillaz and DJ Yuri Martins)	Best National Clip	Won	
Capricho Awards	2017	"Sua Cara" (with Major Lazer & Pabllo Vittar)	Best National Clip		
Capricho Awards	2017	"Sua Cara" (with Major Lazer & Pabllo Vittar)	Best National Clip	Nominated	
Capricho Awards	2017	"Sua Cara" (with Major Lazer & Pabllo Vittar)	Best Hit with Anitta	Nominated	
Capricho Awards	2017	"Vai Malandra" (with MC Zaac, Maejor, Tropkillaz and DJ Yuri Martins)	Best Hit with Anitta	Won	
Capricho Awards	2017	"Loka"	Best Hit with Anitta	Nominated	
Capricho Awards	2017	"Will I See You"	Best Hit with Anitta	Nominated	
Capricho Awards	2017	"Paradinha"	Best Hit with Anitta	Nominated	
Capricho Awards	2017	"Você Partiu Meu Coração"	Best Hit with Anitta	Nominated	
Capricho Awards	2020	Anitta	National Artist	Won	
Capricho Awards	2020	Anitta	Brazil Icon	Nominated	
Capricho Awards	2020	Anitta and Gessica Kayane	Best Friends	Nominated	
Capricho Awards	2020	"Me Gusta" (featuring Cardi B and Myke Towers)	Feat of the Year	Won	
Capricho Awards	2022	Anitta	National Artist	Nominated	
Capricho Awards	2022	"Envolver"	Hit of the Year	Won	
Capricho Awards	2022	Versions of Me	Album of the Year	Won	
Clubbing TV Awards France	2024	"Used to Be"	Best Highlight of the Week Video	Won	
Clubbing TV Awards France	2025	"Funk Rave"	Best Crossover Music Video	Won	
CONTIGO! Online Award	2017	Anitta	Best Female Singer	Nominated	
CONTIGO! Online Award	2017	"Sua Cara" (with Major Lazer & Pabllo Vittar)	Hit of the Year	Won	
CONTIGO! Online Award	2017	"Paradinha"	Hit of the Year	Nominated	
CONTIGO! Online Award	2017	"Loka"	Hit of the Year	Nominated	
CONTIGO! Online Award	2017	"Você Partiu Meu Coração"	Hit of the Year	Nominated	
CONTIGO! Online Award	2017	"Downtown" (with J. Balvin)	Best Clip	Nominated	
CONTIGO! Online Award	2017	"Sua Cara" (with Major Lazer & Pabllo Vittar)	Best Clip	Nominated	
CONTIGO! Online Award	2018	Anitta	Best Female Singer	Nominated	
CONTIGO! Online Award	2019	Anitta	Best Female Singer	Won	
CONTIGO! Online Award	2019	Anittinha's Club	Best Children's Program	Nominated	
CONTIGO! Online Award	2019	"Onda Diferente" (with Ludmilla and Snoop Dogg)	Hit of the Year	Nominated	
CONTIGO! Online Award	2020	Anitta	Best Female Singer	Nominated	
CONTIGO! Online Award	2020	Anitta	Best TikToker	Nominated	
CONTIGO! Online Award	2020	"Me Gusta" (featuring Cardi B and Myke Towers)	Best Song of the Year	Nominated	
CONTIGO! Online Award	2022	"Envolver"	Song of the Year	Nominated	
CONTIGO! Online Award	2022	Anitta	Best Female Singer	Won	
Correio Folia Thophy	2023	"Ai Papai"	Carnival Music	Nominated	
daf BAMA MUSIC AWARDS	2018	Anitta	Best Brazilian Act	Won	
daf BAMA MUSIC AWARDS	2018	Anitta	BAMA's Best Female	Nominated	
Danado de Bom Trophy	2018	"Romance com Safadeza"	Hit do São João	Nominated	
Deezer Monitor Music Awards	2021	"Me Gusta" (featuring Cardi B and Myke Towers)	Best Female Pop Song	Nominated	
Digital Music Experience Awards	2015	"Na Batida"	Top Ringback Tone	Won	
DNA da Balada Awards	2015	Anitta	Best National Female Singer	Nominated	
DNA da Balada Awards	2015	"Bang"	Best National Music	Nominated	
DNA da Balada Awards	2015	"Bang"	Best National Clip	Won	
DNA da Balada Awards	2016	"Sim ou Não" (featuring Maluma)	Best National Production Clip	Won	
DNA da Balada Awards	2016	Anitta	Best Snapchat	Nominated	
DNA da Balada Awards	2016	Anitta	Best National Female Singer	Nominated	
Domínio Teen Awards	2020	Anitta	Featured Artist 2020	Won	
Empreende Brazil Conference	2019	Anitta	Revelation Lecture Award	Won	
Extra de Televisão Awards	2013	"Meiga e Abusada"	Best Musical Theme	Nominated	
Extra de Televisão Awards	2014	"Zen"	Best Musical Theme	Nominated	
Extra de Televisão Awards	2015	"Na Batida"	Best Musical Theme	Nominated	
Extra de Televisão Awards	2016	"Totalmente Demais"	Best Musical Theme	Nominated	
Extra de Televisão Awards	2017	"Essa Mina É Louca"	Best Musical Theme	Nominated	
F5 Awards	2014	"Na Batida"	Hit of the Year	Won	
F5 Awards	2014	Anitta	Female Singer of the Year	Won	
F5 Awards	2015	Anitta	"Kitty" of the Year	Nominated	
F5 Awards	2017	Anitta	Female Singer of the Year	Nominated	
F5 Awards	2017	Anitta	Sexiest Woman	Nominated	
F5 Awards	2017	"Paradinha"	Hit of the Year	Nominated	
F5 Awards	2018	"Romance com Safadeza"	Hit of the Year	Nominated	
F5 Awards	2018	Anitta	Best Singer or Duo	Won	
F5 Awards	2018	Anitta	Sexiest Woman	Won	
F5 Awards	2019	Anitta	Sexiest Woman	Won	
F5 Awards	2019	Anitta	Female Singer of the Year	Nominated	
F5 Awards	2019	"Onda Diferente" (with Ludmilla and Snoop Dogg)	Hit of the Year	Won	
F5 Awards	2019	Anitta and Ludmilla	Gossip of the Year	Won	
F5 Awards	2019	Anitta, Pedro Scooby e Luana Piovani	Gossip of the Year	Nominated	
F5 Awards	2020	Anitta and Leo Dias	Gossip of the Year	Won	
F5 Awards	2020	Anitta	Female Singer of the Year	Won	
F5 Awards	2020	"Desce pro Play (PA PA PA)" (with Mc Zaac and Tyga)	Hit of the Year	Nominated	
F5 Awards	2020	"Me Gusta" (featuring Cardi B and Myke Towers)	Hit of the Year	Won	
F5 Awards	2021	Anitta	Female Singer of the Year	Nominated	
F5 Awards	2021	Anitta	Sexiest Woman	Nominated	
F5 Awards	2021	"Girl from Rio"	Song of the Year	Nominated	
F5 Awards	2024	Anitta	Musical Artist of the Year	Won	
Fans Choice Awards Mexico	2023	Anitta	Urban Female Artist	Won	
Faz Diferença Award	2018	Anitta	Second Notebook: Music	Won	
Flame Roem World Award	2021	Anitta	Brazilian Singer of the Year	Won	
Flame Roem World Award	2021	Anitta	Artist of the Year	Nominated	
Flame Roem World Award	2021	"Modo Turbo" (with Luísa Sonza and Pabllo Vittar)	Brazilian Video of the Year	Won	
Flame Roem World Award	2021	Anitta and Juliette	2021 Shipp	Won	
Flame Roem World Award	2021	Anitters	Brazilian Fandom of the Year	Nominated	
Flame Roem World Award	2021	"Modo Turbo" (with Luísa Sonza and Pabllo Vittar)	Collaboration of the Year	Nominated	
Flame Roem World Award	2021	"Me Gusta" (featuring Cardi B and Myke Towers)	International Song of the Year	Nominated	
Febre Teen Awards	2014	Anitta	Brazilian Artist of the Year	Nominated	
Febre Teen Awards	2016	Anitta	Brazilian Artist of the Year	Nominated	
Febre Teen Awards	2016	Anitta	Best Snapchat	Nominated	
Febre Teen Awards	2016	"Bang"	Best Song/Hit	Nominated	
Febre Teen Awards	2016	"Bang"	Best National Clip	Nominated	
Festa Nacional da Música	2014	Anitta	Singer of the Year	Won	
Fornova Melhores do Ano	2020	"Terremoto" (with Kevinho)	Best single	Nominated	
Furacão 2000 Trophy	2010	Anitta	Revelation of Funk	Won	
Geração Glamour Awards	2015	Anitta	Best Singer	Won	
Geração Glamour Awards	2021	Anitta	Best Singer	Won	
GLAAD Media Award	2023	Versions of Me	Outstanding Music Artist	Nominated	
Grammy Award	2023	Anitta	Best New Artist	Nominated	
Grammy Award	2025	Funk Generation	Best Latin Pop Album	Nominated	
Grammy Award	2027	Equilibrivm	Best Global Music Album	Pending	
Grande Prêmio do Cinema Brasileiro	2021	Anitta: Made in Honório	Best Pay TV/OTT Documentary Series	Nominated	
Gshow Awards	2017	"Paradinha"	Anthem of the Year	Nominated	
Gshow Awards	2017	"Sua Cara" (with Major Lazer & Pabllo Vittar)	Anthem of the Year	Nominated	
Gshow Awards	2017	Anitters - Anitta	fansFandom of the Year	Nominated	
Gshow Awards	2018	Anitters - Anitta	fansFandom of the Year	Nominated	
Heat Latin Music Awards	2019	Anitta	Best Female Artist	Nominated	
Heat Latin Music Awards	2019	"Machika" (with J Balvin and Jeon)	Best Collaboration	Nominated	
Heat Latin Music Awards	2019	"Machika" (with J Balvin and Jeon)	Best Video	Nominated	
Heat Latin Music Awards	2020	Anitta	Best Female Artist	Nominated	
Heat Latin Music Awards	2020	Anitta	Best Artist South Region	Won	
Heat Latin Music Awards	2021	Anitta	Best Female Artist	Nominated	
Heat Latin Music Awards	2021	Anitta	Female Empowerment Trailblazer Award	Honored	
Heat Latin Music Awards	2021	Anitta	Best Artist South Region	Won	
Heat Latin Music Awards	2021	"Mi Niña (Remix)" (with Wisin, Myke Towers and Maluma)	Best Video	Won	
Heat Latin Music Awards	2022	Anitta	Best Female Artist	Nominated	
Heat Latin Music Awards	2022	Anitta	Best Artist South Region	Won	
Heat Latin Music Awards	2024	Anitta	Best Artist South Region	Won	
Heat Latin Music Awards	2024	Anitta	Best Female Artist	Nominated	
Heat Latin Music Awards	2024	"Bellakeo" (with Peso Pluma)	Best Collaboration	Nominated	
Heat Latin Music Awards	2025	"Alegría" (with Tiago PZK and Emilia)	Best Music Video	Pending	
Heat Latin Music Awards	2025	Anitta	Best Artist South Region	Pending	
Heat Latin Music Awards	2025	Anitta	Best Female Artist	Pending	
iBest Award	2021	Anitta	Influencer of the Year - Rio de Janeiro	Won	
iBest Award	2022	Anitters - Anitta fans	Fandom Brazil	Won	
iBest Award	2022	Anitters - Anitta fans	Music Fandom	Won	
iBest Award	2022	Anitta	Influencer of the Year - Rio de Janeiro	Won	
iBest Award	2022	Anitta	Music Personality	Won	
iBest Award	2022	Anitta	Person of the Year	Won	
iBest Award	2022	Anitta	Instagrammer of the Year	Won	
iHeartRadio Music Awards	2018	Anitta	Social Star Award	Won	
iHeartRadio Music Awards	2023	"Envolver"	Best Music Video	Nominated	
iHeartRadio Music Awards	2023	"Envolver"	TikTok Bop of the Year	Nominated	
Impact Awards (Playing for Chance Foundation)	2025	Anitta	Impact Award	Honored	
Imprensa Trophy	2014	Anitta	Revelation of the Year	Nominated	
Imprensa Trophy	2015	Anitta	Best Female Singer	Nominated	
Imprensa Trophy	2016	Anitta	Best Female Singer	Nominated	
Imprensa Trophy	2017	Anitta	Best Female Singer	Nominated	
Imprensa Trophy	2018	Anitta	Best Female Singer	Won	
Imprensa Trophy	2019	Anitta	Best Female Singer	Won	
Imprensa Trophy	2022	Anitta	Best Female Singer	Won	
Influency.me Awards	2019	Anitta	Artist of the Year	Nominated	
International Golden Panther Music Awards	2019	Anitta	Best Brazilian Artist	Nominated	
International Golden Panther Music Awards	2020	Anitta	Best Brazilian Artist	Nominated	
International Reggae and World Music Awards	2020	"Fuego"	Best Crossover Song	Won	
Internet Trophy	2014	Anitta	Revelation of the Year	Nominated	
Internet Trophy	2015	Anitta	Best Female Singer	Nominated	
Internet Trophy	2016	Anitta	Best Female Singer	Nominated	
Internet Trophy	2017	Anitta	Best Female Singer	Nominated	
Internet Trophy	2018	Anitta	Best Female Singer	Nominated	
Internet Trophy	2019	Anitta	Best Female Singer	Nominated	
Internet Trophy	2022	Anitta	Best Female Singer	Nominated	
Latin American Music Awards	2018	"Medicina"	Favorite Video	Won	
Latin American Music Awards	2019	"R.I.P." (with Sofia Reyes and Rita Ora)	Favorite Video	Won	
Latin American Music Awards	2021	Anitta	Favorite Female Artist	Won	
Latin American Music Awards	2021	Anitta	Social Artist of the Year	Nominated	
Latin American Music Awards	2022	Anitta	Social Artist of the Year	Nominated	
Latin American Music Awards	2022	"Girl from Rio"	Favorite Video	Won	
Latin American Music Awards	2023	"Envolver"	Best Urban Song	Nominated	
Latin American Music Awards	2023	Anitta	Best Artist – Pop	Nominated	
Latin Grammy Awards	2014	"Zen"	Best Brazilian Song	Nominated	
Latin Grammy Awards	2016	"Pra Todas Elas" (with Tubarão and Maneirinho)	Best Urban Fusion/Performance	Nominated	
Latin Grammy Awards	2018	"Sua Cara" (with Major Lazer & Pabllo Vittar)	Best Urban Fusion/Performance	Nominated	
Latin Grammy Awards	2018	"Downtown" (with J. Balvin)	Best Urban Song	Nominated	
Latin Grammy Awards	2019	Kisses	Best Urban Music Album	Nominated	
Latin Grammy Awards	2020	"Rave de Favela" (with MC Lan, BEAM and Major Lazer)	Best Urban Song	Nominated	
Latin Grammy Awards	2022	"Envolver"	Record of the Year	Nominated	
Latin Grammy Awards	2022	"Envolver"	Best Reggaeton Performance	Nominated	
Latin Grammy Awards	2024	"Mil Veces"	Record of the Year	Nominated	
Latin Grammy Awards	2024	"Joga pra Lua" (with Pedro Sampaio)	Best Portuguese Language Urban Performance	Nominated	
Latin Grammy Awards	2026	Equilibrivm	Album of the Year	Nominated	
Latin Grammy Awards	2026	Equilibrivm	Best Portuguese Language Contemporary Pop Album	Won	
Latin Music Italian Awards	2014	"Meu Lugar"	Best Latin Female Album of The Year	Won	
Latin Music Italian Awards	2015	Anitta	Artist Saga	Nominated	
Latin Music Italian Awards	2016	Anitta	Best Latin Alternative Artist of The Year	Nominated	
Latin Music Italian Awards	2016	"Sim ou Não" (featuring Maluma)	Best Latin Female Video of The Year	Nominated	
Latin Music Italian Awards	2017	Anitta	Best Brazilian Artist of the Year	Nominated	
Latin Music Italian Awards	2017	Anitta	Best Latin #InstaVip	Nominated	
Latin Music Italian Awards	2017	"Paradinha"	Best Latin Female Video of The Year	Nominated	
Latin Music Italian Awards	2018	"Vai Malandra" (with MC Zaac, Maejor, Tropkillaz and DJ Yuri Martins)	Best Brazilian Song of the Year	Won	
Latin Music Italian Awards	2018	Anitta	Best Brazilian Artist of The Year	Nominated	
Latin Music Italian Awards	2019	Anitta	Best Brazilian Artist of The Year	Won	
Latin Music Italian Awards	2019	Anitta	Best Latin Concert in Italy	Nominated	
Latin Music Italian Awards	2019	"Bola Rebola" (with J Balvin and Tropkillaz)	Best Brazilian Song of the Year	Won	
Latin Music Italian Awards	2019	"Terremoto" (with Kevinho)	Best Brazilian Song of the Year	Nominated	
Latin Music Italian Awards	2019	"Favela Chegou"	Best Brazilian Song of the Year	Nominated	
Latin Music Italian Awards	2019	"R.I.P." (with Sofia Reyes and Rita Ora)	Best Latin Female Video	Won	
Latin Music Italian Awards	2019	"R.I.P." (with Sofia Reyes and Rita Ora)	Best Spanglish Song	Won	
Latin Music Italian Awards	2019	"R.I.P." (with Sofia Reyes and Rita Ora)	Best Latin Choreography Video	Nominated	
Latin Music Italian Awards	2020	Anitters - Anitta fans	Best Latin Fandom	Won	
Latin Music Italian Awards	2020	"Me Gusta" (featuring Cardi B and Myke Towers)	Best Spanglish Song	Won	
Latin Music Italian Awards	2020	"Me Gusta" (featuring Cardi B and Myke Towers)	Best Latin Female Video	Won	
Latin Music Italian Awards	2020	"Paloma" (with Fred de Palma)	Best Eurolatino Song	Nominated	
Latin Music Italian Awards	2020	Anitta	Best Look	Nominated	
Latin Music Italian Awards	2020	Anitta	Best Brazilian Artist	Nominated	
Latin Music Italian Awards	2020	"Desce pro Play (PA PA PA)" (with Mc Zaac and Tyga)	Best Brazilian Song	Nominated	
Latin Music Italian Awards	2020	"Rave de Favela" (with MC Lan, BEAM and Major Lazer)	Best Brazilian Song	Nominated	
Latin Music Italian Awards	2020	"Rave de Favela" (with MC Lan, BEAM and Major Lazer)	Best Latin Video Choreography	Nominated	
Latino Music Awards	2021	Anitta	Best Female Artist (Urban)	Won	
Latino Music Awards	2022	"Envolver"	Song of the Year	Nominated	
Latino Music Awards	2022	"Envolver"	TikTok Viral Song	Nominated	
Latino Music Awards	2022	"Envolver"	Videoclip of the Year	Won	
Latino Music Awards	2022	Anitta	Best Female Artist (Urban)	Won	
Latino Music Awards	2023	Anitta	Best Female Artist (Urban)	Nominated	
Latino Music Awards	2024	Anitta	Best Female Artist (Urban)	Nominated	
LGBT + Som Awards	2019	Kisses	Best Album	Won	
LGBT + Som Awards	2019	"Bola Rebola" (with J Balvin and Tropkillaz)	Best International Pop Song — Featuring or Group	Nominated	
LGBT + Som Awards	2019	"Faz Gostoso" (with Madonna)	Best International Pop Song — Featuring or Group	Nominated	
LGBT + Som Awards	2019	"Onda Diferente" (with Ludmilla and Snoop Dogg)	Best International Pop Song — Featuring or Group	Nominated	
LGBT + Som Awards	2020	"Combatchy" (with Lexa, Luísa Sonza and Rebecca)	Best Music Video	Nominated	
LGBT + Som Awards	2020	"Combatchy" (with Lexa, Luísa Sonza and Rebecca)	Best Song — Featuring or Group	Nominated	
LGBT + Som Awards	2021	"Modo Turbo" (with Luísa Sonza and Pabllo Vittar)	Best Song — Featuring or Group	Nominated	
LGBT + Som Awards	2021	"Modo Turbo" (with Luísa Sonza and Pabllo Vittar)	Best Music Video	Nominated	
LOS40 Music Awards	2019	Anitta	Artist or Producer Los40 Urban	Nominated	
LOS40 Music Awards	2019	"R.I.P." (with Sofia Reyes and Rita Ora)	International Video of the Year	Won	
LOS40 Music Awards	2020	Anitta	Best Latin Act	Nominated	
LOS40 Music Awards	2022	Anitta	Best Latin Act	Won	
LOS40 Music Awards	2022	Versions of Me	Best Latin Album	Nominated	
LOS40 Music Awards	2022	"Envolver" (with Justin Quiles)	Best Latin Collaboration	Nominated	
LOS40 Music Awards	2023	"Funk Rave"	Best Music Video	Nominated	
LOS40 Music Awards	2024	"Aceita"	Best Music Video	Nominated	
Los Angeles International Music Video Festival	2020	"Desce pro Play (PA PA PA)" (with Mc Zaac and Tyga)	Best Artistic Performance	Won	
Los Angeles International Music Video Festival	2020	"Desce pro Play (PA PA PA)" (with Mc Zaac and Tyga)	Best Music Video	Nominated	
Maratona da Alegria	2019	Anitta	Presentation title in the 10 years of history of the "Maratona da Alegria"	Won	
Melhores do Ano	2013	"Show das Poderosas"	Best Song of the Year	Won	
Melhores do Ano	2013	Anitta	Best Female Singer	Nominated	
Melhores do Ano	2015	Anitta	Best Female Singer	Won	
Melhores do Ano	2016	Anitta	Best Female Singer	Won	
Melhores do Ano	2017	Anitta	Best Female Singer	Nominated	
Melhores do Ano	2017	"Paradinha"	Best Song of the Year	Nominated	
Melhores do Ano	2018	Anitta	Best Female Singer	Won	
Melhores do Ano FM O Dia	2015	"Cobertor" (with Projota)	Best Clip	Nominated	
Melhores do Ano FM O Dia	2015	"Blá Blá Blá"	Best Music	Nominated	
Melhores do Ano FM O Dia	2015	Anitta	Best CD or DVD	Won	
Melhores do Ano FM O Dia	2015	Anitta	Best Solo Artist	Won	
Melhores do Ano FM O Dia	2016	Anitta	Best Solo Artist	Won	
Melhores do Ano FM O Dia	2016	Anitta	Best Group/Artist	Won	
Melhores do Ano FM O Dia	2016	"Deixa Ele Sofrer"	Best Clip	Won	
Melhores do Ano FM O Dia	2016	"Na Batida"	Best Music	Won	
Melhores do Ano FM O Dia	2017	"Bang"	Best Music	Won	
Melhores do Ano FM O Dia	2017	"Bang Tour"	Best Show	Nominated	
Melhores do Ano FM O Dia	2017	"Sim ou Não" (featuring Maluma)	Best Clip	Won	
Melhores do Ano FM O Dia	2017	Anitta	Best Group/Artist	Nominated	
Melhores do Ano FM O Dia	2017	Anitta	Best Solo Artist	Won	
Meus Prêmios Nick	2013	Anitta	Favorite Female Singer	Nominated	
Meus Prêmios Nick	2013	Anitta	Musical Revelation	Nominated	
Meus Prêmios Nick	2014	Anitta	Favorite Female Singer	Nominated	
Meus Prêmios Nick	2014	"Cobertor" (with Projota)	Song of the Year	Nominated	
Meus Prêmios Nick	2015	Anitta	Favorite Female Singer	Nominated	
Meus Prêmios Nick	2015	Anitta	Gata do Ano	Nominated	
Meus Prêmios Nick	2016	Anitta	Favorite Female Singer	Won	
Meus Prêmios Nick	2016	Anitta	Gata Trendy	Nominated	
Meus Prêmios Nick	2016	"Bang"	Song of the Year	Nominated	
Meus Prêmios Nick	2017	Anitta	Favorite Female Singer or Duo	Nominated	
Meus Prêmios Nick	2017	Anitta	Favorite Brazilian Instagrammer	Nominated	
Meus Prêmios Nick	2017	"Paradinha"	Favorite Brazilian Hit	Nominated	
Meus Prêmios Nick	2017	"Paradinha"	Favorite Brazilian Video	Nominated	
Meus Prêmios Nick	2017	"Sim ou Não" (featuring Maluma)	Favorite Collaboration	Nominated	
Meus Prêmios Nick	2018	Anitta	Favorite Musical Artist	Won	
Meus Prêmios Nick	2018	Anitta	Gata Trendy	Won	
Meus Prêmios Nick	2018	Anitters - Anitta fans	Fandom of the Year	Nominated	
Meus Prêmios Nick	2018	"Medicina"	Song of the Year	Won	
Meus Prêmios Nick	2018	"Ao Vivo e A Cores" (with Matheus & Kauan)	Song of the Year	Nominated	
Meus Prêmios Nick	2019	Anitta	Favorite Musical Artist	Won	
Meus Prêmios Nick	2019	Anitters - Anitta fans	Fandom of the Year	Nominated	
Meus Prêmios Nick	2019	Anitta at the 2015 Meus Prêmios Nick	Best Show (20 Years of Meus Prêmios Nick)	Won	
Meus Prêmios Nick	2020	Anitta	Favorite Musical Artist	Nominated	
Meus Prêmios Nick	2021	Anitta	Favorite Musical Artist	Nominated	
Meus Prêmios Nick	2021	Plínio	InstaPets	Won	
Meus Prêmios Nick	2021	"Girl from Rio"	Favorite National Hit	Won	
MTV Europe Music Awards	2014	Anitta	Best Brazilian Act	Won	
MTV Europe Music Awards	2014	Anitta	Best Latin American Act	Nominated	
MTV Europe Music Awards	2015	Anitta	Best Latin American Act	Won	
MTV Europe Music Awards	2015	Anitta	Best Brazilian Act	Won	
MTV Europe Music Awards	2016	Anitta	Best Brazilian Act	Won	
MTV Europe Music Awards	2017	Anitta	Best Brazilian Act	Won	
MTV Europe Music Awards	2018	Anitta	Best Brazilian Act	Won	
MTV Europe Music Awards	2019	Anitta	Best Brazilian Act	Nominated	
MTV Europe Music Awards	2020	Anitta	Best Brazilian Act	Nominated	
MTV Europe Music Awards	2021	Anitta	Best Brazilian Act	Nominated	
MTV Europe Music Awards	2022	Anitta	Best Brazilian Act	Nominated	
MTV Europe Music Awards	2022	Anitta	Best Latin	Won	
MTV Europe Music Awards	2023	Anitta	Best Latin	Won	
MTV Europe Music Awards	2023	Anitta	Biggest Fans	Nominated	
MTV Europe Music Awards	2024	Anitta	Biggest Fans	Nominated	
MTV Europe Music Awards	2024	Anitta	Best Latin	Nominated	
MTV Europe Music Awards	2024	"Bellakeo" (with Peso Pluma)	Best Collaboration	Nominated	
MTV Israel: Annual Parade	2018	"Machika" (with J Balvin and Jeon)	Best Video of the Year	Nominated	
MTV Millennial Awards	2018	"Downtown" (with J. Balvin)	Hit of the Year	Won	
MTV Millennial Awards	2018	"Machika" (with J Balvin and Jeon)	Video of the Year	Nominated	
MTV Millennial Awards	2019	Anitta	Instastories	Nominated	
MTV Millennial Awards	2019	Anitta	Viral Artist	Nominated	
MTV Millennial Awards	2019	"R.I.P." "R.I.P." (with Sofia Reyes and Rita Ora)	Music Ship of the Year (Best Collaboration)	Nominated	
MTV Millennial Awards	2021	Anitta	Bichota of the Year	Nominated	
MTV Millennial Awards	2022	Anitta	Global Content Creator	Nominated	
MTV Millennial Awards	2022	Anitta	Motomami of the Year	Nominated	
MTV Millennial Awards	2022	"Envolver"	Viral Anthem	Nominated	
MTV Millennial Awards	2022	"Envolver"	Viral Bomb	Won	
MTV Millennial Awards	2022	Anitta and Bella Poarch	Crazy Collab	Nominated	
MTV Millennial Awards	2023	Anitta	La Loba of the Year	Nominated	
MTV Millennial Awards	2024	"Bellakeo" (with Peso Pluma)	Bellakeo Supremo	Nominated	
MTV Millennial Awards	2024	"Bota Niña" (with Bad Gyal)	Bellakeo Supremo	Nominated	
MTV Millennial Awards	2024	Anitta and Peso Pluma	Epic Kiss of the Year	Won	
MTV Millennial Awards	2024	Anitters - Anitta fans	Fandom of the Year	Nominated	
MTV Millennial Awards Brazil	2018	Anitta	MIAW Icon	Nominated	
MTV Millennial Awards Brazil	2018	Anitta	Musical Artist	Won	
MTV Millennial Awards Brazil	2018	Anitta	Instagrammer	Nominated	
MTV Millennial Awards Brazil	2018	Anitters - Anitta fans	Fandom of the Year	Nominated	
MTV Millennial Awards Brazil	2018	Anitta and SpongeBob SquarePants	Selfie of the Year	Nominated	
MTV Millennial Awards Brazil	2018	"Vai Malandra" (with MC Zaac, Maejor, Tropkillaz and DJ Yuri Martins)	Viral Dance	Nominated	
MTV Millennial Awards Brazil	2018	"Vai Malandra" (with MC Zaac, Maejor, Tropkillaz and DJ Yuri Martins)	Video of the Year	Nominated	
MTV Millennial Awards Brazil	2018	"Vai Malandra" (with MC Zaac, Maejor, Tropkillaz and DJ Yuri Martins)	Anthem of the Year	Won	
MTV Millennial Awards Brazil	2018	"Machika" (with J Balvin and Jeon)	International Hit	Nominated	
MTV Millennial Awards Brazil	2018	"Downtown" (with J. Balvin)	Collaboration of the Year	Won	
MTV Millennial Awards Brazil	2019	Anitta	Musical Artist	Nominated	
MTV Millennial Awards Brazil	2019	Anitta	Live Master	Nominated	
MTV Millennial Awards Brazil	2019	Anitters - Anitta fans	Fandom of the Year	Nominated	
MTV Millennial Awards Brazil	2019	Plínio	Pet of the Year	Won	
MTV Millennial Awards Brazil	2019	"Banana" (with Becky G)	Video of the Year	Won	
MTV Millennial Awards Brazil	2019	"Romance com Safadeza" (with Wesley Safadão)	Karaoke Anthem	Nominated	
MTV Millennial Awards Brazil	2019	"Onda Diferente" (with Ludmilla and Snoop Dogg)	Collaboration of the Year	Nominated	
MTV Millennial Awards Brazil	2019	"Bola Rebola" (with J Balvin and Tropkillaz)	Anthem of the Year	Won	
MTV Millennial Awards Brazil	2020	Anitta	Musical Artist	Won	
MTV Millennial Awards Brazil	2020	Anitters - Anitta fans	Fandom of the Year	Nominated	
MTV Millennial Awards Brazil	2020	"Desce pro Play (Pa, Pa, Pa)" (with MC Zaac and Tyga)	Anthem of the Year	Nominated	
MTV Millennial Awards Brazil	2020	"Desce pro Play (Pa, Pa, Pa)" (with MC Zaac and Tyga)	National Collaboration	Nominated	
MTV Millennial Awards Brazil	2020	"Combatchy" (with Lexa, Luísa Sonza and Rebecca)	National Collaboration	Won	
MTV Millennial Awards Brazil	2021	Anitta	Musical Artist	Nominated	
MTV Millennial Awards Brazil	2021	Anitta	Girl Boss	Nominated	
MTV Millennial Awards Brazil	2021	Anitters - Anitta fans	Fandom of the Year	Nominated	
MTV Millennial Awards Brazil	2021	Norbert Macedo	Pet Influencer	Nominated	
MTV Millennial Awards Brazil	2021	"Girl from Rio"	Video of the Year	Won	
MTV Millennial Awards Brazil	2021	"Modo Turbo" (with Luísa Sonza and Pabllo Vittar)	Video of the Year	Nominated	
MTV Millennial Awards Brazil	2021	"Modo Turbo" (with Luísa Sonza and Pabllo Vittar)	National Collaboration	Nominated	
MTV Millennial Awards Brazil	2021	"Modo Turbo" (with Luísa Sonza and Pabllo Vittar)	Anthem of the Year	Nominated	
MTV Millennial Awards Brazil	2022	Anitta	MIAW Icon	Nominated	
MTV Millennial Awards Brazil	2022	Anitta	Musical Artist	Nominated	
MTV Millennial Awards Brazil	2022	Anitta	From Brasil!	Nominated	
MTV Millennial Awards Brazil	2022	Anitta and Bruna Marquezine	Dupla de Milhões	Nominated	
MTV Millennial Awards Brazil	2022	Versions of Me	Album of the Year	Nominated	
MTV Millennial Awards Brazil	2022	"Envolver"	Global Hit	Nominated	
MTV Millennial Awards Brazil	2022	"Envolver"	Choreography	Nominated	
MTV Video Music Awards	2022	"Envolver"	Best Latin	Won	
MTV Video Music Awards	2023	"Funk Rave"	Best Latin	Won	
MTV Video Music Awards	2024	"Bellakeo"	Best Latin	Nominated	
MTV Video Music Awards	2024	"Mil Veces"	Best Latin	Won	
MTV Video Music Awards	2024	"Mil Veces"	Best Editing	Nominated	
Multishow Brazilian Music Awards	2013	Anitta	New Artist	Nominated	
Multishow Brazilian Music Awards	2013	"Show das Poderosas"	Música-Chiclete	Won	
Multishow Brazilian Music Awards	2013	"Show das Poderosas"	Video of the Year	Won	
Multishow Brazilian Music Awards	2014	"Na Batida"	Best Music Video	Nominated	
Multishow Brazilian Music Awards	2014	"Zen"	Best Song	Nominated	
Multishow Brazilian Music Awards	2015	Anitta	Best Female Singer	Nominated	
Multishow Brazilian Music Awards	2015	Anitta	Best Show	Won	
Multishow Brazilian Music Awards	2015	"Ritmo Perfeito"	Best Song	Won	
Multishow Brazilian Music Awards	2015	"Ritmo Perfeito"	TVZ Music Video of the Year	Nominated	
Multishow Brazilian Music Awards	2015	"Cobertor" (with Projota)	Música Chiclete	Nominated	
Multishow Brazilian Music Awards	2015	"Deixa Ele Sofrer"	New Hit	Nominated	
Multishow Brazilian Music Awards	2016	Anitta	Best Female Singer	Nominated	
Multishow Brazilian Music Awards	2016	Anitta	Best Show	Won	
Multishow Brazilian Music Awards	2016	"Bang"	TVZ Music Video of the Year	Nominated	
Multishow Brazilian Music Awards	2016	"Bang"	Música Chiclete	Nominated	
Multishow Brazilian Music Awards	2016	"Bang"	Best Hit	Nominated	
Multishow Brazilian Music Awards	2016	"Bang"	Best Music Video	Nominated	
Multishow Brazilian Music Awards	2016	"Blecaute" (with Jota Quest)	Best Song	Won	
Multishow Brazilian Music Awards	2016	"Se Você Pensa" (with Skank and Lenine)	Best Música Boa ao Vivo	Nominated	
Multishow Brazilian Music Awards	2017	Anitta	Best Female Singer	Won	
Multishow Brazilian Music Awards	2017	Anitta	Best Show	Nominated	
Multishow Brazilian Music Awards	2017	"Sim ou Não" (featuring Maluma)	Best Song	Won	
Multishow Brazilian Music Awards	2017	"Você Partiu Meu Coração" (with Nego do Borel and Wesley Safadão)	Best Song	Nominated	
Multishow Brazilian Music Awards	2017	"Loka" (with Simone & Simaria)	Música Chiclete	Won	
Multishow Brazilian Music Awards	2017	"Paradinha"	TVZ Music Video of the Year	Nominated	
Multishow Brazilian Music Awards	2018	Anitta	Best Female Singer	Nominated	
Multishow Brazilian Music Awards	2018	Anitta	Best Show	Nominated	
Multishow Brazilian Music Awards	2018	"Vai Malandra" (with MC Zaac, Maejor, Tropkillaz and DJ Yuri Martins)	Música Chiclete	Won	
Multishow Brazilian Music Awards	2018	"Vai Malandra" (with MC Zaac, Maejor, Tropkillaz and DJ Yuri Martins)	TVZ Music Video of the Year	Won	
Multishow Brazilian Music Awards	2018	"Romance com Safadeza" (with Wesley Safadão)	TVZ Music Video of the Year	Nominated	
Multishow Brazilian Music Awards	2019	Anitta	Best Female Singer	Nominated	
Multishow Brazilian Music Awards	2019	"Onda Diferente" (with Ludmilla, Snoop Dogg and Papatinho)	Música Chiclete	Won	
Multishow Brazilian Music Awards	2019	"Bola Rebola" (with J Balvin and Tropkillaz)	Música Chiclete	Nominated	
Multishow Brazilian Music Awards	2019	"Terremoto" (with Kevinho)	TVZ Music Video of the Year	Won	
Multishow Brazilian Music Awards	2020	Anitta	Best Female Singer	Nominated	
Multishow Brazilian Music Awards	2020	"Desce pro Play (PA PA PA)" (with Mc Zaac and Tyga)	Video of the Year	Nominated	
Multishow Brazilian Music Awards	2020	"Desce pro Play (PA PA PA)" (with Mc Zaac and Tyga)	Música Chiclete	Nominated	
Multishow Brazilian Music Awards	2020	"Combatchy" (with Lexa, Luísa Sonza and Rebecca)	TVZ Music Video of the Year	Won	
Multishow Brazilian Music Awards	2021	Anitta	Best Female Singer	Nominated	
Multishow Brazilian Music Awards	2021	Anitta	Performance of the Year	Nominated	
Multishow Brazilian Music Awards	2021	"Girl from Rio"	Song of the Year	Won	
Multishow Brazilian Music Awards	2021	"Girl from Rio"	TVZ Music Video of the Year	Won	
Multishow Brazilian Music Awards	2021	"Modo Turbo" (with Luísa Sonza and Pabllo Vittar)	TVZ Music Video of the Year	Nominated	
Multishow Brazilian Music Awards	2022	Anitta	Artist of the Year	Won	
Multishow Brazilian Music Awards	2022	Anitta	Voice of the Year	Nominated	
Multishow Brazilian Music Awards	2022	Versions of Me	Album of the Year	Nominated	
Multishow Brazilian Music Awards	2022	Versions of Me	Cover of the Year	Nominated	
Multishow Brazilian Music Awards	2022	"Envolver"	Song of the Year	Won	
Multishow Brazilian Music Awards	2022	"Envolver"	Hit of the Year	Nominated	
Multishow Brazilian Music Awards	2022	"Envolver"	TVZ Music Video of the Year	Nominated	
Multishow Brazilian Music Awards	2022	"Boys Don't Cry"	TVZ Music Video of the Year	Won	
Multishow Brazilian Music Awards	2023	"Funk Rave"	TVZ Music Video of the Year	Nominated	
Multishow Brazilian Music Awards	2023	"Pilantra" (with Jão)	TVZ Music Video of the Year	Won	
Multishow Brazilian Music Awards	2023	"Pilantra" (with Jão)	Pop of the Year	Nominated	
Multishow Brazilian Music Awards	2023	"Funk Rave"	Funk of the Year	Nominated	
Multishow Brazilian Music Awards	2023	Anitta	Artist of the Year	Nominated	
Multishow Brazilian Music Awards	2024	Anitta	Artist of the Year	Nominated	
Multishow Brazilian Music Awards	2024	"Joga Pra Lua" (with Dennis and Pedro Sampaio)	Funk of the Year	Won	
Multishow Brazilian Music Awards	2024	Funk Generation	Album of the Year	Nominated	
Multishow Brazilian Music Awards	2024	Funk Generation	Cover of the Year	Nominated	
Multishow Brazilian Music Awards	2024	"Mil Veces"	TVZ Music Video of the Year	Won	
Multishow Brazilian Music Awards	2024	Anitta	Vanguard Trophy	Honored	
Music Video Festival Awards	2021	"Girl from Rio"	Best Music Video	Won	
Music Video Festival Awards	2021	"Girl from Rio"	Best Art Direction in a Videoclip	Nominated	
Music Video Festival Awards	2021	"Girl from Rio"	Best Choreography in a Videoclip	Nominated	
Music Video Festival Awards	2021	"Girl from Rio"	Best Costume in a Videoclip	Won	
Music Video Festival Awards	2021	"Modo Turbo" (with Luísa Sonza and Pabllo Vittar)	Best Costume in a Videoclip	Nominated	
Music Video Festival Awards	2021	"Modo Turbo" (with Luísa Sonza and Pabllo Vittar)	Special Effects in Videoclip	Nominated	
Music Video Festival Awards	2022	"Gata"	Best Costume Design in a Music Video in Partnership with Urban Performance	Nominated	
Music Video Festival Awards	2022	"Tropa"	Best Video for a Brand or Institution	Nominated	
Music Video Festival Awards	2023	"Funk Rave"	Best Music Video	Nominated	
Music Video Festival Awards	2024	Funk Generation: A Baile Funk Experience	National Choreography	Won	
Music Video Festival Awards	2024	Funk Generation: A Baile Funk Experience	National Costume	Won	
Music Video Festival Awards	2024	"Aceita"	National Photography	Nominated	
Music Video Festival Awards	2024	"São Paulo"	International Innovation	Nominated	
Nickelodeon Kids' Choice Awards	2014	"Zen"	Hit of the Year - Brazil	Nominated	
Nickelodeon Kids' Choice Awards	2014	Anitta	Favorite Artist - Brazil	Nominated	
Nickelodeon Kids' Choice Awards	2015	Anitta	Favorite Artist - Brazil	Nominated	
Nickelodeon Kids' Choice Awards	2016	Anitta	Favorite Artist - Brazil	Nominated	
Nickelodeon Kids' Choice Awards	2017	Anitta	Favorite Brazilian Personality	Nominated	
Nickelodeon Kids' Choice Awards	2022	Anitta	Favorite Brazilian Artist	Won	
Nickelodeon Kids' Choice Awards	2023	Anitta	Favorite Latin Artist	Nominated	
Nickelodeon Mexico Kids' Choice Awards	2024	Anitta	Brazilian Artist	Won	
NRJ Music Awards	2021	"Mon Soleil" (with Dadju)	Francophone Collaboration of the Year	Nominated	
NRJ Music Awards	2021	"Mon Soleil" (with Dadju)	Francophone Song of the Year	Nominated	
NRJ Music Awards	2022	"Envolver"	International Song of the Year	Nominated	
NRJ Music Awards	2022	Anitta	International Female Artist of the Year	Nominated	
People's Choice Awards	2022	Anitta	The Latin Artist of 2022	Nominated	
People's Choice Awards	2024	Anitta	The Female Latin Artist of the Year	Nominated	
PLAY - Portuguese Music Awards	2020	"Terremoto" (with Kevinho)	Lusophony Award	Nominated	
PLAY - Portuguese Music Awards	2022	"Modo Turbo" (with Luísa Sonza and Pabllo Vittar)	Lusophony Award	Nominated	
PLAY - Portuguese Music Awards	2023	"No Chão Novinha" (with Pedro Sampaio)	Lusophony Award	Nominated	
POP Mais Awards	2018	"Veneno"	Best Brazilian Videoclip	Nominated	
POP Mais Awards	2018	"Medicina"	Brazilian Song of the Year	Won	
POP Mais Awards	2018	Anitta	Best Brazilian Artist	Nominated	
POP Mais Awards	2018	Anitta	Best Fanbase	Won	
POP Mais Awards	2019	Anitta	Best Fanbase	Nominated	
POP Mais Awards	2019	Anitta	Artist of the Year	Won	
POP Mais Awards	2019	Anitta	Latin Explosion	Won	
POP Mais Awards	2019	Kisses	Album of the Year	Won	
POP Mais Awards	2019	"Onda Diferente" (with Ludmilla and Snoop Dogg)	Best Collaboration	Nominated	
POP Mais Awards	2019	"Onda Diferente" (with Ludmilla and Snoop Dogg)	Song of the Year	Nominated	
POP Mais Awards	2019	"Banana" (with Becky G)	Best Music Video	Nominated	
POP Mais Awards	2020	"Me Gusta" (featuring Cardi B and Myke Towers)	Best Music Video	Won	
POP Mais Awards	2020	"Tócame"	Best Quarantine Clip	Won	
POP Mais Awards	2020	"Desce pro Play (PA PA PA)" (with Mc Zaac and Tyga)	Song of the Year	Nominated	
POP Mais Awards	2020	"Combatchy" (with Lexa, Luísa Sonza and Rebecca)	Best Collaboration	Nominated	
POP Mais Awards	2020	Anitta	Musical Artist of the Year	Won	
POP Mais Awards	2020	Anitta	Fandom of the Year	Won	
POP Mais Awards	2020	Anitta	Best POP Artist	Nominated	
POP Mais Awards	2021	Anitta	Best Female Artist	Nominated	
POP Mais Awards	2021	Anitta	Performance	Nominated	
POP Mais Awards	2021	Anitta	Top Social	Nominated	
POP Mais Awards	2021	Anitta	Best Fandom	Nominated	
POP Mais Awards	2021	"Modo Turbo" (with Luísa Sonza and Pabllo Vittar)	Best Collaboration	Nominated	
POP Mais Awards	2021	"Girl from Rio"	Best Music Video	Won	
POP Mais Awards	2021	"Girl from Rio"	Song of the Year	Won	
Pop Mundo News Awards	2020	Anitta	Singer of the Year	Won	
POPTime Awards	2019	Anitta	National Artist of the Year	Nominated	
POPTime Awards	2019	"Terremoto" (with Kevinho)	National Song of the Year	Nominated	
Premio EXA	2019	Anitta	Presentation title at the EXA Concerto 2019	Won	
Premio GQ Hombre del Año México	2018	Anitta	Best International Female Singer	Won	
Prêmio GQ Men of the Year Brasil	2017	Anitta	Woman of the Year	Won	
Prêmio GQ Men of the Year Brasil	2019	Anitta	Woman of the Year	Won	
Prêmio Jovem Brasileiro	2014	"Na Batida"	Best Music	Won	
Prêmio Jovem Brasileiro	2014	Anitta	Best Young Female Singer	Won	
Prêmio Jovem Brasileiro	2014	Anitta	Best Dance	Won	
Prêmio Jovem Brasileiro	2015	Anitta	Best Young Female Singer	Won	
Prêmio Jovem Brasileiro	2015	Anitta	Young of the Year	Nominated	
Prêmio Jovem Brasileiro	2015	"Ritmo Pefeito"	Song of the Year	Nominated	
Prêmio Jovem Brasileiro	2015	Best Show	Meu Lugar Tour	Nominated	
Prêmio Jovem Brasileiro	2015	"No Meu Talento"	Clip of the Year	Nominated	
Prêmio Jovem Brasileiro	2016	"Bang"	Song of the Year	Nominated	
Prêmio Jovem Brasileiro	2016	Bang Tour	Best Show	Nominated	
Prêmio Jovem Brasileiro	2016	Anitta	Best Presenter	Nominated	
Prêmio Jovem Brasileiro	2016	Anitta	Best Instagram	Nominated	
Prêmio Jovem Brasileiro	2016	Anitta	Young of the Year	Nominated	
Prêmio Jovem Brasileiro	2016	Anitta	Best Young Female Singer	Won	
Prêmio Jovem Brasileiro	2017	Anitta	Best Young Female Singer	Won	
Prêmio Jovem Brasileiro	2017	Anitta	Young of the Year	Nominated	
Prêmio Jovem Brasileiro	2017	Anitta	Best Instagram	Nominated	
Prêmio Jovem Brasileiro	2017	Anitta	Best Presenter	Nominated	
Prêmio Jovem Brasileiro	2017	"Você Partiu Meu Coração" (with Nego do Borel and Wesley Safadão)	Clip of the Year	Won	
Prêmio Jovem Brasileiro	2017	"Paradinha"	Best Music	Nominated	
Prêmio Jovem Brasileiro	2017	Bang Tour	Best Show	Nominated	
Prêmio Jovem Brasileiro	2018	"Vai Malandra" (with MC Zaac, Maejor, Tropkillaz and DJ Yuri Martins)	Hit 2018	Nominated	
Prêmio Jovem Brasileiro	2018	"Downtown" (with J. Balvin)	¡Me Gusta!	Nominated	
Prêmio Jovem Brasileiro	2018	Anitters - Anitta fans	Best fandom in Brazil	Nominated	
Prêmio Jovem Brasileiro	2018	Anitta	Young of the Year	Nominated	
Prêmio Jovem Brasileiro	2018	Anitta	Best Presenter	Nominated	
Prêmio Jovem Brasileiro	2018	Anitta	Best Instagram	Nominated	
Prêmio Jovem Brasileiro	2018	Anitta	Best Female Singer	Won	
Prêmio Jovem Brasileiro	2019	Anitta	Best Female Singer	Won	
Prêmio Jovem Brasileiro	2019	Anitta	Best Instagram	Nominated	
Prêmio Jovem Brasileiro	2019	Anitta	Best Show	Nominated	
Prêmio Jovem Brasileiro	2019	Bombastic Clip	"Não Perco Meu Tempo"	Nominated	
Prêmio Jovem Brasileiro	2019	"Ao Vivo e A Cores"	Best Feat	Nominated	
Prêmio Jovem Brasileiro	2019	"Favela Chegou"	Best Feat	Nominated	
Prêmio Jovem Brasileiro	2019	"Terremoto" (with Kevinho)	Best Feat	Won	
Prêmio Jovem Brasileiro	2019	"Terremoto" (with Kevinho)	Hit of the Year	Nominated	
Prêmio Jovem Brasileiro	2019	"Banana" (with Becky G)	¡Me Gusta!	Nominated	
Prêmio Jovem Brasileiro	2019	"Medicina"	¡Me Gusta!	Nominated	
Prêmio Jovem Brasileiro	2019	"Veneno"	¡Me Gusta!	Nominated	
Prêmio Jovem Brasileiro	2019	"R.I.P." (with Sofia Reyes and Rita Ora)	¡Me Gusta!	Nominated	
Prêmio Jovem Brasileiro	2020	Anitta Dentro da Casinha	Best Program	Nominated	
Prêmio Jovem Brasileiro	2020	"Combatchy" (with Lexa, Luísa Sonza and Rebecca)	Best Feat	Won	
Prêmio Jovem Brasileiro	2020	"Combatchy" (with Lexa, Luísa Sonza and Rebecca)	Hit of the Year	Nominated	
Prêmio Jovem Brasileiro	2020	"Combatchy" (with Lexa, Luísa Sonza and Rebecca)	Bombastic Clip	Nominated	
Prêmio Jovem Brasileiro	2020	Anitta	Young with the most style in Brazil	Nominated	
Prêmio Jovem Brasileiro	2020	Anitta	Best Fandom	Nominated	
Prêmio Jovem Brasileiro	2020	Anitta	Best Instagram	Nominated	
Prêmio Jovem Brasileiro	2020	Anitta	Best TikToker in Brazil	Nominated	
Prêmio Jovem Brasileiro	2020	Anitta	Best Live	Nominated	
Prêmio Jovem Brasileiro	2020	Anitta	Best Female Singer	Nominated	
Prêmio Jovem Brasileiro	2021	Anitta	Best Female Singer	Nominated	
Prêmio Jovem Brasileiro	2021	Anitta	Best Latin Singer	Won	
Prêmio Jovem Brasileiro	2021	"Girl From Rio"	Bombastic Clip	Nominated	
Prêmio Jovem Brasileiro	2021	"Modo Turbo" (with Luísa Sonza and Pabllo Vittar)	Bombastic Clip	Won	
Prêmio Jovem Brasileiro	2021	"Modo Turbo" (with Luísa Sonza and Pabllo Vittar)	Hit of the Year	Nominated	
Prêmio Jovem Brasileiro	2021	"Modo Turbo" (with Luísa Sonza and Pabllo Vittar)	Feat of the Year	Nominated	
Prêmio Jovem Brasileiro	2022	Anitta	Best Female Singer	Nominated	
Prêmio Jovem Brasileiro	2023	Anitta	Best Female Singer	Nominated	
Prêmio Jovem Brasileiro	2023	"Funk Rave"	Hit of the Year	Nominated	
Prêmio Rádio Globo Quem	2021	"Modo Turbo" (with Luísa Sonza and Pabllo Vittar)	Best Choreography	Won	
Prêmio Rádio Globo Quem	2021	"Desce pro Play (PA PA PA)" (with Mc Zaac and Tyga)	Best Choreography	Nominated	
Prêmio Rádio Globo Quem	2021	"Modo Turbo" (with Luísa Sonza and Pabllo Vittar)	Best Feat	Nominated	
Prêmio Rádio Globo Quem	2021	"Combatchy" (with Lexa, Luísa Sonza and Rebecca)	Best Feat	Nominated	
Prêmio Rádio Globo Quem	2021	"Desce pro Play (PA PA PA)" (with Mc Zaac and Tyga)	Best Brazilian Pop Song	Nominated	
Prêmio Rádio Globo Quem	2021	Anitta	Best Fan Club	Nominated	
Premios Eres	2018	Anitta	Best Female Singer	Won	
Premios Eres	2018	"Downtown" (with J. Balvin)	Best Music Video	Won	
Premios Gardel	2023	"La Loto" (with Tini and Becky G)	Best Urban Collaboration	Nominated	
Premios Gardel	2025	"Alegría" (with Tiago PZK and Emilia)	Best Urban Collaboration	Pending	
Premios Hits del Verano	2021	"Modo Turbo" (with Luísa Sonza and Pabllo Vittar)	Best Music Video Choreography	Won	
Premios Hits del Verano	2021	"Modo Turbo" (with Luísa Sonza and Pabllo Vittar)	Best Brazilian Music Video	Nominated	
Premios Hits del Verano	2021	"Me Gusta" (featuring Cardi B and Myke Towers)	Favorite Collaboration	Won	
Premios Hits del Verano	2021	"Me Gusta" (featuring Cardi B and Myke Towers)	Video of the Year	Won	
Premios Hits del Verano	2021	"Me Gusta" (featuring Cardi B and Myke Towers)	Hit of the Summer	Won	
Premios Hits del Verano	2021	"Girl from Rio"	Record of the year	Won	
Premios Hits del Verano	2021	"Girl from Rio"	Viral Music	Nominated	
Premios Hits del Verano	2021	Anitta	Summer Artist	Won	
Premios Hits del Verano	2021	Anitta	Favorite Female Artist	Nominated	
Premios HOY Magazine	2020	Anitta	Best Latin Singer of the Year	Nominated	
Premios Juventud	2019	"R.I.P." (with Sofia Reyes and Rita Ora)	Sick Dance Routine (Best Choreography)	Nominated	
Premios Juventud	2021	"Mi Niña (Remix)" (with Wisin, Myke Towers and Maluma)	La Mezcla Perfecta (Song with the Best Collaboration)	Won	
Premios Juventud	2021	"Me Gusta" (featuring Cardi B and Myke Towers)	OMG Collaboration (Collaboration with an Anglo artist)	Nominated	
Premios Juventud	2022	Anitta	Artist of the Youth – Female	Nominated	
Premios Juventud	2022	Anitta	My Favorite Streaming Artist	Nominated	
Premios Juventud	2022	"Envolver"	The Catchiest Song	Nominated	
Premios Juventud	2022	"Envolver"	The Hottest Choreography	Won	
Premios Juventud	2022	"Envolver"	Best Social Dance Challenge	Nominated	
Premios Juventud	2022	"Envolver (Remix)" (with Justin Quiles)	Viral Track of the Year	Nominated	
Premios Juventud	2023	Anitta	Premios Juventud Female Artist	Nominated	
Premios Juventud	2023	"La Loto" (with Tini and Becky G)	Girl Power	Nominated	
Premios Juventud	2023	"La Loto" (with Tini and Becky G)	Hottest Choreo	Nominated	
Premios Juventud	2023	Versions of Me	Best Pop/Urban Album	Nominated	
Premios Juventud	2023	"No Más" (with Murda Beatz featuring Quavo, J Balvin and Pharrell Williams)	OMG Collaboration	Nominated	
Premios Juventud	2024	"Funk Rave"	Best Urban Track	Nominated	
Premios Juventud	2024	"Bellakeo" (with Peso Pluma)	Lá Mezcla Perfecta	Won	
Premios Juventud	2024	Anitta	Premios Juventud Female Artist	Nominated	
Premios Juventud	2024	Anitta	Agent of Change	Honored	
Prêmios Likes Brasil	2021	Anitta	Twitter of the Year	Won	
Prêmios Likes Brasil	2021	"Me Gusta" (featuring Cardi B and Myke Towers)	Clip Doesn't Stop Playing	Won	
Prêmios Likes Brasil	2021	"Modo Turbo" (with Luísa Sonza and Pabllo Vittar)	Clip Doesn't Stop Playing	Nominated	
Prêmios Likes Brasil	2021	"Modo Turbo" (with Luísa Sonza and Pabllo Vittar)	Favorite Collaboration	Nominated	
Prêmios Likes Brasil	2021	"Me Gusta" (featuring Cardi B and Myke Towers)	Favorite Collaboration	Won	
Prêmios Likes Brasil	2021	"Desce pro Play (PA PA PA)" (with Mc Zaac and Tyga)	Brazilian Viral Hit	Nominated	
Prêmios Likes Brasil	2022	Anitta	Timeless Teen Icon	Honored	
Prêmios Likes Brasil	2022	Anitta	Twitter of the Year	Won	
Prêmios Likes Brasil	2022	Anitta	Artist Prêmios Likes Brasil	Nominated	
Prêmios Likes Brasil	2022	"Envolver"	Streaming Trophy to the Legend	Won	
Prêmios Likes Brasil	2022	"No Chão Novinha" (with Pedro Sampaio)	Viral Song	Won	
Prêmios Likes Brasil	2022	"Faking Love" (with Saweetie)	Collaboration of the Year	Won	
Premios Lo Nuestro	2019	Anitta	Social Artist of the Year	Nominated	
Premios Lo Nuestro	2019	Anitta	Revelation Artist of the Year	Nominated	
Premios Lo Nuestro	2019	Anitta	Female Urban Artist of the Year	Nominated	
Premios Lo Nuestro	2019	"Machika" (with J Balvin and Jeon)	Urban Collaboration of the Year	Nominated	
Premios Lo Nuestro	2020	"R.I.P." (with Sofia Reyes and Rita Ora)	Crossover Collaboration of the Year	Nominated	
Premios Lo Nuestro	2020	"R.I.P." (with Sofia Reyes and Rita Ora)	Video of the Year	Nominated	
Premios Lo Nuestro	2021	"Me Gusta" (featuring Cardi B and Myke Towers)	Crossover Collaboration of the Year	Nominated	
Premios Lo Nuestro	2021	Anitta	Female Urban Artist of the Year	Nominated	
Premios Lo Nuestro	2022	Anitta	Female Urban Artist of the Year	Nominated	
Premios Lo Nuestro	2022	"La Mamá de La Mamá (Remix)"	Pop-Urban Song of the Year	Nominated	
Premios Lo Nuestro	2023	"Envolver"	Song of the Year	Nominated	
Premios Lo Nuestro	2023	"Envolver"	Pop-Urban Song of the Year	Nominated	
Premios Lo Nuestro	2023	"Envolver"	Urban - Song of the Year	Nominated	
Premios Lo Nuestro	2023	"Envolver (Remix)" (with Justin Quiles)	Remix of the Year	Nominated	
Premios Lo Nuestro	2023	Versions of Me	Urban - Album of the Year	Nominated	
Premios Lo Nuestro	2023	Anitta	Urban - Female Artist of the Year	Nominated	
Premios Lo Nuestro	2024	Anitta	Urban - Female Artist of the Year	Nominated	
Premios Lo Nuestro	2024	"La Loto" (with Tini and Becky G)	Pop-Urban - Collaboration Of The Year	Nominated	
Premios Lo Nuestro	2025	Funk Generation	Pop-Urban Album of the Year	Nominated	
Premios Lo Nuestro	2025	"Bellakeo" (with Peso Pluma)	Urban Song of the Year	Won	
Premios Lo Nuestro	2025	"Funk Rave"	Pop-Urban Song of the Year	Nominated	
Premios Lo Nuestro	2025	"Alegría" (with Tiago PZK and Emilia)	Urban Collaboration Of The Year	Nominated	
Premios Lo Nuestro	2025	"La Tóxica" (with Alejandro Fernández)	The Perfect Mix of the Year	Nominated	
Premios Lo Nuestro	2025	"La Tóxica" (with Alejandro Fernández)	Mariachi/Ranchera Song Of The Year	Nominated	
Premios Lo Nuestro	2025	Anitta	Urban - Female Artist of the Year	Nominated	
Premios Lo Nuestro	2026	Anitta	Urban - Female Artist of the Year	Pending	
Premios Lo Nuestro	2026	"Romeo"	Urban Song of the Year	Pending	
Premios Lo Nuestro	2026	“En 4” (with Kenia Os)	Best Female Combination	Pending	
Premios Lo Nuestro	2026	"São Paulo" (with The Weeknd)	Crossover Collaboration of the Year	Pending	
Premios Master Music	2025	Anitta	Internacional Artist	Nominated	
Premios Musa	2022	"Envolver (Remix)" (with Justin Quiles)	International Latin Song of the Year	Nominated	
Premios Quiero	2019	"Medicina"	Best Video Female Artist	Nominated	
Premios Quiero	2019	"R.I.P." (with Sofia Reyes and Rita Ora)	Best Choreography	Nominated	
Premios Quiero	2019	Anitta	Best Artist YouTube Channel	Nominated	
Premios Quiero	2020	Anitta	Best Instagrammer Musician	Nominated	
Premios Quiero	2021	Anitta	Best Influencer Musician	Nominated	
Premios Quiero	2022	Anitta	Best Influencer Musician	Nominated	
Premios Quiero	2023	Anitta	Best Influencer Musician	Nominated	
Premios Tu Música Urbano	2019	Anitta	International Female Artist	Nominated	
Premios Tu Música Urbano	2020	Anitta	Top Female New Generation	Nominated	
Premios Tu Música Urbano	2022	Anitta	Top Artist — Female	Nominated	
Premios Tu Música Urbano	2022	Anitta	Top Social Artist	Nominated	
Premios Tu Música Urbano	2022	Anitta	Top Artist — Pop Urban	Won	
Premios Tu Música Urbano	2022	"Envolver"	Song of the Year	Nominated	
Premios Tu Música Urbano	2023	Anitta	Top Artist — Female	Nominated	
Premios Tu Música Urbano	2023	"La Loto" (with Tini and Becky G)	Video of the Year	Nominated	
Premios Tu Música Urbano	2023	Versions of Me	Album of the Year – Female Artist	Nominated	
Premios Tu Música Urbano	2025	Funk Generation	Album of the Year – Female Artist	Pending	
Premios Tu Música Urbano	2025	Anitta	Artist of the Year	Pending	
Pure Charts Awards	2023	Anitta	Internacional Female Artist of the Year	Nominated	
Queerties Awards	2023	"Boys Don't Cry (Live)" (with Miley Cyrus)	Anthem	Nominated	
Queerties Awards	2024	"Mil Veces"	Music Video	Nominated	
Quem de Música Awards	2014	Anitta	Best Female Singer	Nominated	
Quem de Música Awards	2015	Anitta	Best Female Singer	Nominated	
Rádio Music Awards Brasil	2013	Anitta	Best Female Singer	Won	
Rádio Music Awards Brasil	2013	Anitta	Revelation	Won	
Rádio Music Awards Brasil	2013	"Show das Poderosas"	Best Music	Won	
Rádio Music Awards Brasil	2013	"Show das Poderosas"	Best Clip	Won	
Rádio Music Awards Brasil	2013	Anitta	Best Album	Nominated	
Rádio Music Awards Brasil	2014	Ritmo Perfeito	Best Album	Won	
Rádio Music Awards Brasil	2014	"Cobertor" (with Projota)	Best Music	Won	
Rádio Music Awards Brasil	2014	"Cobertor" (with Projota)	Best Clip	Nominated	
Rádio Music Awards Brasil	2014	Anitta	Best Female Singer	Won	
Rádio Music Awards Brasil	2015	Anitta	Best Female Singer	Won	
Rádio Music Awards Brasil	2015	"Bang"	Best Choreography	Nominated	
Rádio Music Awards Brasil	2015	"Bang"	Best Album	Nominated	
Rádio Music Awards Brasil	2015	"Bang"	Best Music Project Online	Nominated	
Rádio Music Awards Brasil	2015	"Bang"	Best Clip	Nominated	
Rádio Music Awards Brasil	2015	"Bang"	Best Music	Nominated	
Rádio Music Awards Brasil	2016	"Sim ou Não" (featuring Maluma)	Best Music	Nominated	
Rádio Music Awards Brasil	2016	"Sim ou Não" (featuring Maluma)	Best Clip	Nominated	
Rádio Music Awards Brasil	2016	"Sim ou Não" (featuring Maluma)	Best Choreography	Won	
Rádio Music Awards Brasil	2016	Bang Tour	Best Tour	Won	
Rádio Music Awards Brasil	2016	Anitta	Best Female Singer	Nominated	
Rádio Music Awards Brasil	2016	Anitta	Artist of the Year	Won	
SEAT Music Awards	2021	"Paloma" (with Fred de Palma)	Single Multi-Platinum Award	Honored	
SEC Awards	2019	"Onda Diferente" (with Ludmilla and Snoop Dogg)	National Song of the Year	Nominated	
SEC Awards	2019	Anitta	National Artist of the Year	Nominated	
SEC Awards	2020	"Combatchy" (with Lexa, Luísa Sonza and Rebecca)	National Song of the Year	Won	
SEC Awards	2020	Anitta	National Artist of the Year	Won	
SEC Awards	2021	"Modo Turbo" (with Luísa Sonza and Pabllo Vittar)	National Song of the Year	Nominated	
SEC Awards	2021	"Me Gusta" (featuring Cardi B and Myke Towers)	National Song of the Year	Nominated	
SEC Awards	2021	Anitta	National Female Artist of the Year	Nominated	
SEC Awards	2021	"Modo Turbo" (with Luísa Sonza and Pabllo Vittar)	Best National Clip of the Year	Nominated	
SEC Awards	2021	"Me Gusta" (featuring Cardi B and Myke Towers)	Best National Clip of the Year	Nominated	
SEC Awards	2021	Anitters	Best Fandom of the Year	Nominated	
SEC Awards	2021	Anitta: Made in Honório	Best Documentary	Nominated	
SEC Awards	2022	"Envolver"	Song of the Year	Nominated	
SEC Awards	2022	"Boys Don't Cry"	Clip of the Year	Nominated	
SEC Awards	2022	Anitta	Female Artist of the Year	Nominated	
SEC Awards	2022	"Faking Love" (with Saweetie)	International Feat of the Year	Nominated	
SEC Awards	2022	Anitters	Fandom of the Year	Nominated	
SEC Awards	2023	À Procura da Anitta Perfeita	National Album/EP of the Year	Nominated	
SEC Awards	2023	Anitta	National Female Artist of the Year	Nominated	
SEC Awards	2023	"Pilantra" (with Jão)	Song of the Year	Nominated	
SEC Awards	2023	"Pilantra" (with Jão)	National Feat of the Year	Nominated	
SEC Awards	2023	"Pilantra" (with Jão)	Favorite Clip of the Year	Nominated	
SEC Awards	2024	"Joga pra Lua" (with Pedro Sampaio)	Brazilian Feat of the Year	Nominated	
SEC Awards	2024	"Bellakeo" (with Peso Pluma)	International Song of the Year	Nominated	
SEC Awards	2024	"Bellakeo" (with Peso Pluma)	Favorite Clip of the Year	Nominated	
SEC Awards	2024	"Bellakeo" (with Peso Pluma)	International Feat of the Year	Nominated	
SEC Awards	2024	"Funk Rave"	Gum Hit of the Year	Nominated	
SEC Awards	2024	Anitta	Latin Artist of the Year	Won	
SESAC Latina Music Awards	2023	"Envolver" (Written Lenny Tavárez)	Song of the Year Pop/Latin Rhythm	Won	
Splash Awards	2020	Anitta Dentro da Casinha	Best TV Show	Nominated	
Splash Awards	2020	Anitta and Ludmilla	Best Gossip on the Internet	Nominated	
Splash Awards	2020	"Me Gusta" (featuring Cardi B and Myke Towers)	Best International Song of the Year	Nominated	
Splash Awards	2020	"Me Gusta" (featuring Cardi B and Myke Towers)	Best National Videoclip	Nominated	
Splash Awards	2020	Anitta	Best Artist of the Year	Nominated	
Splash Awards	2021	Anitta	Best Gossip Icon	Nominated	
Splash Awards	2021	"Girl from Rio"	Best Music Video	Nominated	
Splash Awards	2021	Anitta	Best Musical Artist	Nominated	
Splash Awards	2022	Anitta	Singer of the Year	Won	
Splash Awards	2022	"Envolver"	Hit of the Year	Won	
Splash Awards	2022	"Boys Don't Cry"	Best Music Video	Nominated	
Splash Awards	2023	Anitta	Best Podcast Guest on a Talk Show	Nominated	
Splash Awards	2023	Anitta	Best Singer	Won	
Splash Awards	2024	Funk Generation	Best Album of the Year	Won	
Teen Choice Awards	2018	Anitta	Choice Music Web Star	Nominated	
Telehit Awards	2018	Anitta	Presentation titles in TeleHit's 25-year history	Won	
TikTok Awards	2022	Anitta	TikTok Artist	Won	
TikTok Awards	2022	"Envolver"	A Hit is a Hit	Nominated	
The LUKAS Awards	2019	Anitta	International Artist of the Year	Nominated	
The LUKAS Awards	2019	Anitta @ South Bank	Concert by International Artist of the Year	Nominated	
The LUKAS Awards	2019	"Downtown" (with J. Balvin)	International Song of the Year	Nominated	
The Pop Hub Awards	2018	Anitta	Najlepsza Gwiazda Latynoska (Best Latin Star)	Won	
The Pop Hub Awards	2019	Anitta	Ulabiona Gwiazda Latynoska (Favorite Latin Artist)	Won	
The Pop Hub Awards	2022	"Envolver"	Najlepsza Choreografia (Best Choreography)	Nominated	
TodaTeen Awards	2020	Anitta	National Female Singer	Won	
TodaTeen Awards	2020	"Me Gusta" (featuring Cardi B and Myke Towers)	Feat of the Year	Nominated	
TodaTeen Awards	2021	"Modo Turbo" (with Luísa Sonza and Pabllo Vittar)	Feat of the Year	Won	
TodaTeen Awards	2021	Anitters - Anitta fans	Fandom of the Year	Nominated	
Top 50 Music Awards	2019	Kisses	Best Album - International Categories	Won	
Top 50 Music Awards	2019	Best Video - International Categories	"Veneno"	Won	
Top 50 Music Awards	2019	Anitta	Best Female Act	Nominated	
Top 50 Music Awards	2019	Anitta	Best Latin Act	Nominated	
Top 50 Music Awards	2019	Anitta	Best American Act	Nominated	
Top 50 Music Awards	2019	Anitta	Biggest Fans	Nominated	
Top 50 Music Awards	2019	"R.I.P." (with Sofia Reyes and Rita Ora)	Best Collaboration - International Categories	Nominated	
Top 50 Music Awards	2019	"R.I.P." (with Sofia Reyes and Rita Ora)	Best Summer Hit	Nominated	
Top 50 Music Awards	2019	"Banana" (with Becky G)	Best Summer Hit	Nominated	
Top 50 Music Awards	2020	"Contando Lunares" (Remix)	Best Song - National Categories	Nominated	
Top 50 Music Awards	2020	"Me Gusta" (featuring Cardi B and Myke Towers)	Best Song - International Categories	Nominated	
Top 50 Music Awards	2020	"Fuego"	Best Song - International Categories	Nominated	
Top 50 Music Awards	2020	"Fuego"	Best Video - International Categories	Nominated	
Top 50 Music Awards	2020	Anitta	Biggest Fans	Nominated	
Top 50 Music Awards	2020	"Me Gusta" (featuring Cardi B and Myke Towers)	Best Collaboration - International Categories	Nominated	
Top 50 Music Awards	2020	"Paloma" (with Fred de Palma)	Best Collaboration - International Categories	Nominated	
Top 50 Music Awards	2020	Anitta	Artist on the Rise	Nominated	
Top 50 Music Awards	2020	Anitta	Best Latin Act	Nominated	
Top 50 Music Awards	2020	Anitta	Best American Act	Nominated	
Top 50 Music Awards	2020	Anitta	Best Female Act	Nominated	
Top 50 Music Awards	2021	Anitta	Best Act or Group	Nominated	
Top 50 Music Awards	2021	Anitta	Best Latin Act	Nominated	
Top 50 Music Awards	2021	Anitta	Biggest Fans	Nominated	
Top 50 Music Awards	2021	"Modo Turbo" (with Luísa Sonza and Pabllo Vittar)	Best Song	Nominated	
Top 50 Music Awards	2021	"Modo Turbo" (with Luísa Sonza and Pabllo Vittar)	Best Collaboration	Nominated	
Top 50 Music Awards	2023	Anitta	Best Latin Act	Nominated	
Top 50 Music Awards	2023	Anitta	Best Act or Group	Nominated	
Top 50 Music Awards	2023	"Envolver"	Best Song	Nominated	
Top 50 Music Awards	2023	Versions of Me	Best Album	Nominated	
Top 50 Music Awards	2023	"La Loto" (with Tini and Becky G)	Best Collaboration	Nominated	
Top 50 Music Awards	2023	"Boys Don't Cry"	Best Video	Nominated	
Tudo Information Awards	2018	Anitta	Brazilian Artist of the Year	Nominated	
Tudo Information Awards	2018	Anitta	Latin Artist	Won	
Tudo Information Awards	2018	"Medicina"	Video of the Year	Nominated	
Tudo Information Awards	2018	Anitters	Brazilian Fandom	Nominated	
Tudo Information Awards	2019	"Combatchy" (with Lexa, Luísa Sonza and Rebecca)	Brazilian Hit	Nominated	
Tudo Information Awards	2020	Anitters	Brazilian Fandom	Won	
Tudo Information Awards	2020	"Bellaquita Remix"	Feat of the Year	Won	
Tudo Information Awards	2020	"Rave de Favela" (with MC Lan, BEAM and Major Lazer)	Funk Hit	Won	
Tudo Information Awards	2021	Anitta	Brazilian Singer of the Year	Won	
Tudo Information Awards	2021	"Modo Turbo" (with Luísa Sonza and Pabllo Vittar)	Brazilian Feat	Won	
Tudo Information Awards	2021	"Me Gusta" (featuring Cardi B and Myke Towers)	Internacional Feat	Won	
Tudo Information Awards	2021	Anitters	Brazilian Fandom	Nominated	
Tudo Information Awards	2022	Anitta	Brazilian Singer of the Year	Won	
Tudo Information Awards	2022	"No Chão Novinha" (with Pedro Sampaio)	Brazilian Hit	Nominated	
Tudo Information Awards	2022	"Envolver"	Internacional Hit	Nominated	
Tudo Information Awards	2022	Anitters	Brazilian Fandom	Nominated	
Tudo Information Awards	2022	"Boys Don't Cry"	Music Video of the Year (Brazil)	Won	
Urban Music Awards	2019	Anitta	Best Fan Club	Pending	
Urban Music Awards	2019	Kisses	Album of the Year	Pending	
Urban Music Awards	2019	"Rosa"	Best Video	Pending	
Urban Music Awards	2019	"Jacuzzi"	Best Collaboration	Pending	
Variety's Power of Women	2024	Anitta	Finds New Notes do Hit	Honored	
Vídeo Show Trophy	2017	"Essa Mina É Louca"	Hottest song of 2017	Nominated	
Videoclip Italia Awards	2025	"Get Up Bitch! Shake Ya Ass" (with Victoria De Angelis)	Migliore Videoclip Elettronica	Pending	
Viña del Mar Internacional Song Festival	2024	Anitta	Most Popular Artist of the Viña 2024	Won	
Viña del Mar Internacional Song Festival	2024	Anitta	Silver Seagull	Honored	
Viña del Mar Internacional Song Festival	2024	Anitta	Golden Seagull	Pending	
Viva Latino - Spotify Playlist	2022	"Envolver"	Favorite Song of 2022	Won	
Webby Awards	2023	The SIMS 'Spark Something'	Advertising, Media & PR - Best Video Editing	Won	
Webby Awards	2024	Anitta Squad	Games - Public Service & Social Impact	Won	
Webby Awards	2024	Powered by Potatoes	Video - Viral Marketing	Won	
WSJ. Magazine's Innovator Awards	2022	Anitta	Music Innovator	Honored	
Women's Music Event Awards	2017	Anitta	Best Singer	Nominated	
Women's Music Event Awards	2017	Anitta	Best Music Entrepreneur	Nominated	
Women's Music Event Awards	2017	"Paradinha"	Best Music	Nominated	
Women's Music Event Awards	2017	"Loka"	Best Music	Nominated	
Women's Music Event Awards	2017	"Sua Cara" (with Major Lazer & Pabllo Vittar)	Best Music Video	Nominated	
Women's Music Event Awards	2018	"Vai Malandra" (with MC Zaac, Maejor, Tropkillaz and DJ Yuri Martins)	Best Music	Nominated	
Women's Music Event Awards	2019	"Onda Diferente" (with Ludmilla and Snoop Dogg)	Popular Music	Nominated	
Women's Music Event Awards	2020	Anitta	Best Singer	Nominated	
Women's Music Event Awards	2020	"Combatchy" (with Lexa, Luísa Sonza and Rebecca)	Best Music Video	Nominated	
Women's Music Event Awards	2020	"Me Gusta" (featuring Cardi B and Myke Towers)	Best Mainstream Music	Nominated	
Women's Music Event Awards	2022	"Envolver"	Best Latin Music	Won	
Women's Music Event Awards	2023	"Funk Rave"	Latin American Music	Won	
Women's Music Event Awards	2024	"Mil Veces"	Latin American Music	Nominated	
YouTube Carnaval Awards	2015	"Ritmo Perfeito"	Clip/Summer Hit	Won	
YouTube Carnaval Awards	2017	"Loka"	Song of the Year	Won	
You Pop Awards	2020	Anitters	Fandom of the Year	Won	
You Pop Awards	2020	Anitta	National Singer of the Year	Nominated	

== Civil honors ==
- Motion of applause from de Chamber of Espírito Santo 2022.

== Other accolades ==
=== World records ===
Key
†	Indicates a now former world record holder

Name of publication, year the record was awarded, name of the record, and the name of the record holder
Publication	Year	World record	Record holder	Ref.
Guinness World Records	2022	First solo Latin artist to reach No.1 on Spotify	Anitta	
Guinness World Records	2022	First female solo artist to win Best Latin at the MTV Video Music Awards	Anitta	
World Record Academy	2023	World's Most Powerful Potato Battery	Anitta and Lay's	

=== Listicles ===
Name of publisher, name of listicle, year(s) listed, and placement result
Publisher	Year(s)	Listicle	Result	Ref.
Billboard	2021	The Best Red Carpet Photos From the 2021 MTV VMAs	3rd	
Billboard	2021	The 25 Best Latin Songs of 2021: Staff List	N/A - Girl from Rio	
Billboard	2022	Best Performance at the 2022 AMAs	3rd	
Billboard	2022	The 100 Best Songs of 2022: Staff List	89th - Envolver	
Billboard	2022	The trailblazers LGBT+ icons in Latin Music of this generation	1st	
Billboard	2022	Best Red Carpet Photos From 2022 VMAs	N/A	
Billboard	2022	The 20 Best Pride Albums of 2022: Staff Picks	N/A - Versions of Me	
Billboard	2022	The 22 Best Latin Albums of 2022: Staff Picks	N/A - Versions of Me	
Billboard	2022	The 25 Best Pride Songs of 2022	N/A - Boys Don't Cry	
Billboard	2022	Best Performance of the VMAs	3rd	
Billboard	2023	‘RuPaul's Drag Race’: Every Lip Sync Ranked From Season 15's ‘Lalaparuza’	3rd - Malaysia Babydoll Foxx vs. Marcia Marcia Marcia: Anitta, “Boys Don't Cry”	
Billboard	2023	‘RuPaul's Drag Race’: Every Lip Sync From Season 15, Ranked	6th - Malaysia Babydoll Foxx vs. Marcia Marcia Marcia: Anitta, “Boys Don't Cry”	
Billboard	2023	11 LGBTQ Latin Artists We're Currently Obsessed With	1st	
Billboard	2023	65 Top LGBTQ+ Anthems of All Time	23rd - Boys Don't Cry	
Billboard	2024	70 Top LGBTQ+ Anthems of All Time	28th - Boys Don't Cry	
BIRDYE	2023	The Best Dressed Celebrities at the 2023 Grammys	6th	
Bloomberg Linea	2022	Most Influential people in Latin America in 2022	N/A	
Bloomberg Linea	2023	Impact Women in Latin America 2023	N/A	
CNN	2022	Best Dressed acts at the VMas 2022	N/A	
Cosmopolitan	2022	55 Sexiest Music Videos of all time	N/A - Envolver	
Cosmopolitan	2023	The 18 Best- and Worst-Dressed Celebrities at the 2023 Grammy Awards	7th	
Eolor	2021	Best Brazilian Music Video of 2021	5th - Girl from Rio	
Eolor	2022	Best Clips from Brazil in 2022	4th - Boys Don't Cry	
Forbes	2022	Most Admired Woman in Brazil	2nd	
Forbes	2023	Most Admired Woman in Brazil	4th	
G1	2022	20 Most Anticipated Albums of 2022	N/A - Versions of Me	
Harpers Bazaar	2023	The 15 Best-Dressed Stars at the 65th Annual Grammys	8th	
HITS Daily Double	2023	Hits List Elevates - Who's hoppin' right now?	4th	
¡Hola!	2022	15 Latin Hits That Made Us Dance and Sing in 2022	N/A - Envolver	
Infobae	2022	The 100 Best Songs to Receive New Year 2023	19th - Envolver	
Infobae	2023	Grammy 2023: quiénes fueron los mejor y peor vestidos	N/A	
Insider	2022	The most daring looks celebrities wore on the 2022 VMAs red carpet	N/A	
Latina	2022	Top 20 Songs of 2022	11th - Envolver	
Los Angeles Times	2022	The 100 Best Songs of 2022	14th - Envolver	
Los Angeles Times	2023	The Best Looks from the 2023 Grammys	16th	
Los Angeles Times	2023	Latinx Files: The Pride Month mixtape edition	6th - Pabllo Vittar and Anitta, “Balinha de Coração”	
Marie Claire	2023	The Grammys 2023 Red Carpet: The Best Looks	17th	
Maxim	2023	Meet the Women of the 2023 MAXIM HOT 100	N/A	
Most Requested Live with Romeo	2023	Top 10 Most Requested Songs of 2022 on #MostRequestedLive	1st - Boys Don't Cry	
Music Times	2023	Grammy Awards 2023 Biggest Snubs	N/A	
O Globo	2020	Most influential personality in politics in Brazil in 2020	3rd	
People	2022	Best Moments of the VMAs 2022	9th	
People	2023	Best Dressed at the 2023 Grammys	9th	
People en Español	2019	Boss Ladies: The World of Reggaeton Queens	2nd	
People en Español	2022	Las mejor vestidas de los premios Grammy 2023	2nd	
Remezcla	2023	Favorite Super Bowl LVII Commercials	9th	
Rolling Stone	2022	The 100 Best Albums of 2022	31st - Versions of Me	
Rolling Stone	2022	Coachella 2022 - The 24 Best Things We Saw	N/A	
Rolling Stone	2022	100 Greatest Reggaeton Songs of All Time	81st - Envolver	
Rolling Stone	2023	2023 Grammy Awards Red Carpet: The Wildest Looks From Music's Biggest Night	10th	
Sheknows	2023	Best-Dressed Celebrities at the 2023 Grammys	16th	
Stereogum	2022	The 10 Best Pop Albums of 2022	5th - Versions of Me	
Teen Vogue	2023	Best Dressed from the Grammys 2023	5th	
Telemundo	2022	Queens of Urban Music	N/A	
The Independent	2023	Grammys 2023: The best-dressed stars on the red carpet	N/A	
The Lawton Constitution	2022	The 100 Best Songs of 2022	14th - Envolver	
Tidal	2021	Best Reggaeton Song of 2021	31st - Envolver	
Tidal	2021	Best Latin Video of 2021	42nd - Girl from Rio	
Tidal	2022	Best Latin Song of 2022	7th - Envolver	
Tidal	2022	Best Songs of 2022	57th - Envolver	
USA Today	2022	Best Performance of the VMAs	4th	
UPROXX	2022	The Best Songs of 2022	N/A - Envolver	
UPROXX	2022	The Best Latin Albums of 2022	N/A - Versions of Me	
UPROXX	2022	The Best Pop Albums of 2022	N/A - Versions of Me	
Vanity Fair	2023	The Best-Dressed Celebrities at the 2023 Grammys	11th	
Variety	2022	The 10 Best Latin Albums of 2022	9th - Versions of Me	
Variety	2022	Best Dressed 2022 MTV Video Music Awards	N/A	
Variety	2023	Variety's Impactful Internacional Women of 2023	7th	
Variety	2023	Red carpet's best dressed Grammy 2023	N/A	
Vogue	2022	The Best Beauty Looks from the MTV VMAs 2022	4th	
Vogue	2023	The Best Dressed Stars at the 2023 Grammy Awards	11th - Anitta in Vintage Versace	
Vogue	2023	The Best Jewelry Moments From the 2023 Met Gala	4th - Anitta in Roger Dubuis's Velvet Platinum 38MM watch, valued at $1.1 million	
Vogue	2023	The Best Dressed Stars at the 2023 Grammy Awards	29th	
Vogue India	2023	Best-dressed list from the 2022 MTV VMA Red Carpet	4th	
Vogue UK	2022	The Best Beauty Looks From The MTV VMAs 2022	4th	
Vogue UK	2023	The Best Dressed Stars At The 2023 Grammy Awards	11th	
Vogue Singapore	2023	The Best red carpet looks from the MTV VMAs 2022	5th	
YardBarker	2022	The Best Songs that Defined 2022	N/A - Lobby	

== See also ==
- Anitta Discography
- Anitta Live Performances
