= Medicina (song) =

Single by Anitta
- Language: Spanish
- English title: "Medicine"
- Released: July 20, 2018
- Recorded: 2018
- Genre: Reggaeton
- Length: 2:21
- Label: Warner Brasil
- Songwriters: Larissa Machado; Mauricio Montaner; Jon Leone; Mario Cáceres; Andy Clay
- Producer: Jon Leone

Anitta singles chronology
"Fica Tudo Bem" (2018)	"Medicina" (2018)	"Perdendo a Mão" (2018)

Music video
- "Medicina" on YouTube

"Medicina" (transl. "Medicine") is a song recorded by Brazilian singer Anitta. It was released as a single on July 20, 2018, through Warner Music Brasil. The song was written by Anitta, Mauricio Montaner (half of Venezuelan musical duo Mau y Ricky), Jon Leone, Mario Cáceres and Andy Clay.

== Background and release ==
In 2017, Anitta began expressing an interest in expanding her career further abroad from Brazil, into greater Latin America, North America and Europe, among other markets. She began studying Spanish regularly prior to this development, and had been associating with numerous Spanish-language artists. That year, she announced a project titled CheckMate, which consisted of releasing a new song each month, either in Portuguese, Spanish or English, along with a music video. She debuted with the project "Will I See You" (produced by Poo Bear), which became her debut single in English, as the lead artist. In October, she released "Is That for Me", a collaboration with Swedish artist Alesso. For the November release, the singer recorded "Downtown", a hit collaboration with Colombian singer J Balvin. The last single of the project was "Vai Malandra", a female empowerment anthem combining funk carioca and trap; according to Anitta, it would be the coup "checkmate" to complete the project. Early in 2018, Anitta was featured on J Balvin's "Machika" and also released a single of her own, titled "Indecente".

On June 20, 2018, with the launch of Instagram's new video platform, Anitta announced that she would begin promoting her next single via showing her fans the process of creating a song. Within the format of a mini-webseries, Anitta began releasing a number of webisodes, allowing fans to witness how her next single was to be composed and selected. Anitta herself was stuck between choosing "Medicina" and the still-unreleased, future single "Veneno", ultimately releasing the former. A total of 8 webisodes were released, showcasing everything from marketing strategies, promotion and the making of music videos to writing and production, as well as the voting process with Warner Music executives. The episodes also featured her friends and fellow collaborators, such as Alesso, Lele Pons and Rudy Mancuso.

== Music video ==
=== Official video ===
Directed by 36 Grados, the accompanying music video premiered on Vevo the same day of the single release. The video was shot during July 2018, in a total of six different locations - Colombia, Hong Kong, India, United States, South Africa and Brazil.

As the song features a choir of children singing "da-da-da" repeatedly during the chorus (before Anitta sings "…dámelo otra vez"), the music video also features both children and young adults from each respective country, dancing throughout, with different color themes and styles. The Hong Kong scenes show a group of young Chinese women dancing with fans in front of a temple, with at least one of them showing her hip hop dance skills, as well. The Brazilian scenes feature Anitta wearing a yellow bob-cut wig with denim shorts and an umbrella, dancing with children wearing yellow. The yellow-themed street scene is meant to evoke the energy of Salvador, Bahia. The Indian scenes show a mahout (or Indian elephant trainer) with his Asian elephant, as well as girls dancing in the classical Kathak style inside a large temple. The American scenes show a troupe of ballet dancers, girls and two boys, rehearsing in a New York City studio. The Colombian scenes feature a tribal family from the Amazon basin dancing outside of their palm-leaf thatched-roof house. The South African scenes feature a troupe of children dancing barefoot in the sand to high-energy choreography. Throughout the video, each respective group of children is shown mouthing some of the lyrics while looking at the camera.

Anitta shot her solo scenes in Colombia on July 2, 2018, dancing on a skyscraper rooftop with colored smoke streamers. In the first look, Anitta is wearing a yellow jumpsuit with black heels (from the cover of the single); in the final look, she has on a blousy skirt and long-sleeved top, with long pigtails, while she dances barefoot in colored sand. The Colombian location where she was filmed dancing is a helipad landing area, on the uppermost level of a skyscraper, which was painted in rainbow colors. The rest of the crew then traveled to the other countries to shoot the rest of the scenes. The final cut of the video was completed two days before official release.

Upon its release, the video gathered 10 million views on its first day. As of 2024, the music video for "Medicina" has received over 195 million views on YouTube.

=== Spotify video ===
A music video premiered on Spotify's mobile app on August 10, 2018, on the newly relaunched ¡Viva Latino! playlist, and became her second vertical video to premiere as a Spotify exclusive. The vertical music video features Anitta singing in front of the camera.

== Track listing ==
Digital download

1. "Medicina" – 2:21

== Charts ==
Chart performance for "Medicina"
Chart (2018)	Peak position
Argentina (Argentina Hot 100)	43
Brazil (Billboard Hot 100)	27
Brazil Hot Pop Songs (Billboard)	1
Brazil Streaming (Pro-Música)	4
Chile (Monitor Latino)	14
Colombia (National-Report)	41
Mexico Airplay (Billboard)	27
Portugal (AFP)	15
Portugal Digital Songs (Billboard)	1
US Latin Pop Songs (Billboard)	35
US World Digital Songs (Billboard)	20
Venezuela (National-Report)	47

== Certifications ==
Region	Certification	Certified units/sales
Portugal (AFP)	Gold	5,000^{‡}
United States (RIAA)	Gold (Latin)	30,000^{‡}
^{‡} Sales+streaming figures based on certification alone.

== Credits and personnel ==
- Vocals – Anitta
- Songwriting – Anitta, Mauricio Montaner, Jon Leone, Mario Cáceres and Andy Clay
- Production – Jon Leone
