= Veneno (song) =

Single by Anitta

from the EP Solo
- Language: Spanish
- English title: "Poison"
- Released: 9 November 2018
- Length: 2:38
- Label: Warner Brasil
- Songwriters: Larissa Machado; Marco Masís; Eduardo Vargas; Camilo Echeverry
- Producers: Tainy; Dynell

Anitta singles chronology
"Jacuzzi" (2018)	"Veneno" (2018)	"Não Perco Meu Tempo" (2018)

Music video
- "Veneno" on YouTube

"Veneno" is a song by Brazilian singer Anitta from her extended play, Solo. It was written by Anitta, Tainy, Eduardo Vargas and Camilo Echeverry, and produced by Tainy and Dynell. It was released as the extended play's lead single on 9 November 2018 through Warner Music Brasil.

== Background and release ==
On June 20, 2018, with the launch of Instagram's new video platform, Anitta announced she would begin promoting her next single by showing the process of picking up a single using the format of a webseries. Anitta was in doubt between the then-unreleased tracks "Medicina"" and "Veneno" to release as the follow-up single to "Indecente". A total of 8 chapters were released for the webseries and it showcased marketing estrategies, the making of the music videos for "Medicina" and "Veneno", interviews with the writers and producers of both tracks and a voting which included Warner Music executives, both Anitta's Brazilian and international teams, as well as other artists such as Alesso, Lele Pons and Rudy Mancuso. "Medicina" was ultimately chosen to be released as a single on July 20, 2018. Anitta later confirmed that she wanted "Veneno" to be released before "Medicina" but assured that the first would be released in a later moment because she loves the song and "the video was too expensive".

In October, 2018, while being interview by Billboard on the red carpet of 2018 MTV Europe Music Awards, Anitta announced the release of an extended play containing songs in English, Spanish and Portuguese, later revealed to be titled Solo, set to be released on November 9, 2018, which would include "Veneno", a Pharrell Williams-produced English track titled "Goals" and the Portuguese song "Não perco meu tempo". Following the release of the extended play, Anitta released both "Veneno" and "Não perco meu tempo" as singles simultaneously, while the first was aimed at the Latin/Spanish market and the latter one at the Brazilian market.

== Music video ==
The official music video for "Veneno" was directed by João Papa and released alongside the music videos for "Goals" and "Não perco meu tempo" on November 9, 2018, the same day the extended play Solo was released to streaming services and online stores. The video showcases Anitta performing among snakes and according to Billboard, the video "has powerful scenes" and "represent how “bad girl” [Anitta] can be".

== Charts ==
=== Weekly charts ===
Chart (2018)	Peak position
Argentina (Argentina Hot 100)	96
Colombia (National-Report)	24
Mexico Espanol Airplay (Billboard)	18
Portugal (AFP)	19

=== Monthly charts ===
Chart (2018)	Peak position
Brazil Streaming (Pro-Música)	12

=== Year-end charts ===
Chart (2019)	Position
Portugal (AFP)	146

== Certifications ==
Region	Certification	Certified units/sales
Portugal (AFP)	Platinum	10,000^{‡}
United States (RIAA)	Gold (Latin)	30,000^{‡}
^{‡} Sales+streaming figures based on certification alone.
