= Bellakeo =

Single by Peso Pluma and Anitta

from the album Éxodo
- Language: Spanish
- Released: 7 December 2023
- Genre: Reggaeton
- Length: 3:17
- Label: Double P
- Songwriters: Hassan Emilio Kabande Laija; Mario Cáceres; Jorge Alberto Erazo; Juan Diego Medina; Ángel Sandoval; Juan Daniel Arias; Omar José Pulido Vicari
- Producers: Mario Cáceres; Jorge Milliano

Peso Pluma singles chronology
| "Una Bala" (2023) | "Bellakeo" (2023) | "Rompe la Dompe" (2023) |

Anitta singles chronology
| "Monstrão" (2023) | "Bellakeo" (2023) | "Joga pra Lua" (2023) |

Music video
- "Bellakeo" on YouTube

"Bellakeo" is a song by Mexican singer and rapper Peso Pluma and Brazilian singer Anitta. It was released through Double P Records on 7 December 2023, as the lead single of Peso Pluma's fourth studio album, Éxodo (2024).

== Background and release ==
After the release of Peso Pluma's album Génesis, the singer also continued and was able to achieve fame and success in his other reggaeton songs previously like "Quema" with Colombian singer Ryan Castro, "Ex-Special" with Puerto Rican singer Jhayco, "Ojos Azules" with Colombian singer Blessd or "La Chamba" with American singer Arcángel.

At the beginning of December 2023, Anitta announced through her WhatsApp channel and other social media the release of the song, scheduled to be released on December 7. They also shared previews of the music video.

== Music and lyrics ==
Musically, "Bellakeo" is a Spanish-language "infectious reggaeton song with a fusion of irresistible rhythms and seductive voices". It has lyrics that include "Toa' la noche bellaqueo", where the chorus is repeated by both artists four times.

== Music video ==
The music video, which premiered simultaneously with the single on 7 December 2023, was recorded in Madrid, Spain. In the video it can see both singers performing the song in a partially lit dark area with several people dancing and twerking; Anitta can also be seen twerking in the video.

== Charts ==
=== Weekly charts ===
Weekly chart performance for "Bellakeo"
| Chart (2023–2024) | Peak position |
|---|---|
| Argentina Hot 100 (Billboard) | 21 |
| Bolivia (Billboard) | 1 |
| Brazil Hot 100 (Billboard) | 46 |
| Central America (Monitor Latino) | 3 |
| Chile (Billboard) | 1 |
| Ecuador (Billboard) | 6 |
| Global 200 (Billboard) | 7 |
| Greece (IFPI) | 65 |
| Guatemala (Monitor Latino) | 8 |
| Honduras (Monitor Latino) | 4 |
| Mexico (Billboard) | 6 |
| Nicaragua (Monitor Latino) | 1 |
| Paraguay (Monitor Latino) | 2 |
| Peru (Billboard) | 2 |
| Portugal (AFP) | 26 |
| Spain (Promusicae) | 59 |
| US Billboard Hot 100 | 53 |
| US Hot Latin Songs (Billboard) | 3 |
| US Rhythmic Airplay (Billboard) | 18 |

=== Year-end charts ===
Year-end chart performance for "Bellakeo"
| Chart (2024) | Position |
|---|---|
| Global 200 (Billboard) | 144 |
| US Hot Latin Songs (Billboard) | 11 |

== Certifications ==
Certifications for "Bellakeo"
| Region | Certification | Certified units/sales |
|---|---|---|
| Brazil (Pro-Música Brasil) | Diamond | 160,000^{‡} |
| Mexico (AMPROFON) | 4× Platinum | 560,000^{‡} |
| Portugal (AFP) | Gold | 5,000^{‡} |
| Spain (Promusicae) | Platinum | 100,000^{‡} |
| United States (RIAA) | 38× Platinum (Latin) | 2,280,000^{‡} |
^{‡} Sales+streaming figures based on certification alone.
