= Anitta: Made in Honório =

- Genre: Documentary
- Starring: Anitta; Lauren McFall; Arielle Macedo
- Country of origin: Brazil
- Original language: Portuguese
- No. of seasons: 1
- No. of episodes: 6

Production
- Running time: 26–35 minutes

Original release
- Network: Netflix
- Release: December 16, 2020

Anitta: Made In Honório is a 2020 docuseries released on Netflix on December 16, 2020, starring Anitta, Lauren McFall and Arielle Macedo.

== Cast ==
- Anitta
- Lauren McFall
- Arielle Macedo
- Felipe Britto
- Daniel Trovejani
- David Brazil
- Renan Machado
- Paulo Pimenta
- Miriam Macedo
