= MTV Europe Music Award for Biggest Fans =

Annual music award

- Awarded for: Fandoms
- Country: Europe
- Presented by: MTV
- First award: 2011
- Currently held by: Lisa (2024)

Highlights
- Most awards: BTS (5)
- Most nominations: Taylor Swift (9)
- Website: ema.mtv.tv

The MTV Europe Music Award for Biggest Fans is an award category at the MTV Europe Music Awards. The award was first presented in 2011 and has been given every year since except 2023. BTS is the most awarded artist in this category, with five wins. Taylor Swift is the most nominated artist in this category, with nine nominations.

== Winners and nominees ==
Winners are listed first and highlighted in bold.

=== 2010s ===
Year	Artist	Fan Group Name	Ref
2011
2011	**Lady Gaga**	**Little Monsters**	
2011	Thirty Seconds to Mars	Echelon	
2011	Justin Bieber	Beliebers	
2011	Selena Gomez	Selenators	
2011	Paramore	Paraholic	
2012
2012	**One Direction**	**Directioners**	
2012	Lady Gaga	Little Monsters	
2012	Justin Bieber	Beliebers	
2012	Katy Perry	KatyCats	
2012	Rihanna	Rihanna Navy	
2013
2013	**Tokio Hotel**	**Aliens**	
2013	Lady Gaga	Little Monsters	
2013	Justin Bieber	Beliebers	
2013	One Direction	Directioners	
2013	Thirty Seconds to Mars	Echelon	
2014
2014	**One Direction**	**Directioners**	
2014	Nicki Minaj	Barbz	
2014	Justin Bieber	Beliebers	
2014	5 Seconds of Summer	5SOSFam	
2014	Ariana Grande	Arianators	
2015
2015	**Justin Bieber**	**Beliebers**	
2015	5 Seconds of Summer	5SOSFam	
2015	One Direction	Directioners	
2015	Katy Perry	KatyCats	
2015	Taylor Swift	Swifties	
2016
2016	**Justin Bieber**	**Beliebers**	
2016	Ariana Grande	Arianators	
2016	Beyoncé	BeyHive	
2016	Lady Gaga	Little Monsters	
2016	Shawn Mendes	Mendes Army	
2017
2017	**Shawn Mendes**	**Mendes Army**	
2017	Taylor Swift	Swifties	
2017	Ariana Grande	Arianators	
2017	Katy Perry	KatyCats	
2017	Justin Bieber	Beliebers	
2018
2018	**BTS**	**Army**	
2018	Camila Cabello	Camilizers	
2018	Selena Gomez	Selenators	
2018	Shawn Mendes	Mendes Army	
2018	Taylor Swift	Swifties	
2019
2019	**BTS**	**Army**	
2019	Ariana Grande	Arianators	
2019	Billie Eilish	Avocados	
2019	Shawn Mendes	Mendes Army	
2019	Taylor Swift	Swifties	

=== 2020s ===
Year	Artist	Fan Group Name	Ref
2020
2020	**BTS**	**Army**	
2020	Ariana Grande	Arianators	
2020	Blackpink	Blinks	
2020	Justin Bieber	Beliebers	
2020	Lady Gaga	Little Monsters	
2020	Taylor Swift	Swifties	
2021
2021	**BTS**	**Army**	
2021	Ariana Grande	Arianators	
2021	Blackpink	Blinks	
2021	Justin Bieber	Beliebers	
2021	Lady Gaga	Little Monsters	
2021	Taylor Swift	Swifties	
2022
2022	**BTS**	**Army**	
2022	Blackpink	Blinks	
2022	Harry Styles	Harries	
2022	Lady Gaga	Little Monsters	
2022	Nicki Minaj	Barbz	
2022	Taylor Swift	Swifties	
2023
2023	**No winner**		
2023	Anitta	Anitters	
2023	Billie Eilish	Avocados	
2023	Blackpink	Blinks	
2023	Jungkook	Army	
2023	Nicki Minaj	Barbz	
2023	Olivia Rodrigo	Livies	
2023	Sabrina Carpenter	Carpenters	
2023	Selena Gomez	Selenators	
2023	Taylor Swift	Swifties	
2024
2024	**Lisa**	**Lilies**	
2024	Anitta	Anitters	
2024	Ariana Grande	Arianators	
2024	Beyoncé	Beyhive	
2024	Billie Eilish	Avocados	
2024	Chappell Roan	Popstars	
2024	Charli XCX	Angels	
2024	Katy Perry	KatyCats	
2024	Nicki Minaj	Barbz	
2024	Sabrina Carpenter	Carpenters	
2024	Shawn Mendes	Mendes Army	
2024	Taylor Swift	Swifties	

== Statistics ==
=== Artists with multiple wins ===
5 wins

- BTS

2 wins

- One Direction
- Justin Bieber

=== Artists with multiple nominations ===
9 nominations

- Taylor Swift

7 nominations

- Lady Gaga
- Ariana Grande

5 nominations

- Shawn Mendes
- BTS

4 nominations

- One Direction
- Katy Perry
- Nicki Minaj
- Blackpink

3 nominations

- Selena Gomez
- Billie Eilish

2 nominations

- Thirty Seconds to Mars
- 5 Seconds of Summer
- Beyoncé
- Anitta
- Sabrina Carpenter
