= Paradinha (song) =

Single by Anitta
- Language: Spanish
- Released: May 31, 2017
- Genre: Dancehall
- Length: 2:21
- Label: Warner Music
- Songwriters: Larissa Machado; Umberto Tavares; Jefferson Junior

Anitta singles chronology
"Switch" (2017)	"Paradinha" (2017)	"Sua Cara" (2017)

Music video
- "Paradinha" on YouTube

"Paradinha" (transl. Little Break) is a song by Brazilian singer Anitta. It was released on May 31, 2017 by Warner Music. Written by Anitta, Umberto Tavares and Jefferson Junior, the song was expected to be included on her upcoming fourth studio album. It is the first single in Spanish by Anitta after "Sí o No" featuring Maluma. "Paradinha" is a mix of dancehall-pop and reggaeton with tropical house influences. Inspired by artists like Shakira and Ricky Martin, Anitta recorded the song in Spanish as an attempt to reach the millions of people who speak the language in the United States, with plans to cross over to the English-speaking market in the future.

== Background and release ==
On September 9, 2014, Anitta made her first step towards an audience outside Brazil by releasing a Spanish version of her song "Zen" with a new video featuring Spanish singer Rasel. In 2015, with the release of her third album, Bang, which became a success in Brazil, the singer began to plan an international career and after studying the music industry she decided that the best way to reach a foreign audience was through the Latin market, she begin to take Spanish lessons from a private tutor and started to work with reggaeton artists after seeing a renewed interest in the genre around the world. In January 2016, she was featured in a remix of the song "Ginza" by Colombian singer J Balvin, to help promote him in Brazil and to get her fans familiar with reggaeton and the Spanish language, which she intended to adopt on her next project.

In May 2016, Anitta recorded an English version of "Bang" specially for Midem – worldwide gathering of entrepreneurs of the music industry – although the song has not been used for any purpose after. On July 28, she released "Sim ou Não" which featured Colombian singer Maluma, focusing on reggaeton, as well as a Spanish version titled "Sí o No". From an initial underwhelming performance compared to her previous releases, the collaboration gave international visibility to the singer in Latin America, reaching number 15 in Chile, and 13 in Mexico.

In 2017, Anitta collaborated with Australian rapper Iggy Azalea on the track "Switch" for her now cancelled album Digital Distortion, while Anitta was in New York to record the single and the music video with Azalea, she also secretly recorded "Paradinha". Through social media, Anitta announced that she was preparing a surprise for her fans from all over Latin America, she would be releasing her first fully Spanish single from her upcoming fourth studio album, and on May 31, 2017 the song along with the music video was released.

== Musical structure and lyrics ==
"Paradinha" mixes two popular genres of 2017, dancehall and tropical house, made popular again by songs like "Sorry" by Justin Bieber, "Shape of You" by Ed Sheeran, and "Work" By Rihanna. The song also features elements of reggaetón and pop music. Among the instruments used in its production are Jamaican percussion and the electronic flute. The track was composed by Anitta along with Umberto Tavares and Jefferson Junior, who had already worked with her on most of her prior singles. Originally, the song was written in Portuguese, later translated to Spanish, adapting the stanzas and rhymes to the language. The singer explained that the term paradinha, meaning "little move" or "little stop", is a reference to the Brazilian dance quadrado (lit. "square"), in which the dancer moves their hips and buttocks in a provocative manner, gyrating in four different directions, like a "square". The closest comparisons are the American dance style commonly called "twerking" or the Puerto Rican perreo (the latter often being mentioned in reggaetón lyrics) mixed with more nuanced, isolated techniques of popping and locking.

The main theme of the track is flirting, with Anitta stating it is she who has control of a new relationship, reinforcing female empowerment throughout the song. With the lyrics suggesting that it is primarily the female dominating, she makes advances on her partner, saying: «Yo te quiero ver enloquecer; quiero provocarte. Vas a ver que cuando quiero algo, yo lo puedo hacer; si no me conoces no dudes de mí…» (English: "I want to see you go crazy; I want to provoke you. You’re going to see that when I want something, I can do [attain] it. If you don’t know me, don’t doubt me…"). She then says «Yo sé que tú no lo admites, pero puedo ver muérete de ganas quieres verme hacer aquella paradinha» ("I know you won’t admit it, but I can see you’re dying to see me do that little dance"). After the chorus, which is simply the word "paradinha"l repeated rhythmically four times, she says: «Yo deje tu mundo al revés. ¿Te vas a negarlo otra vez?» ("I turned your world upside down. Are you going to deny it again?") The bridge, while somewhat simple lyrically, reinforces the songs themes of female empowerment, saying: «Tienes miedo; tú me quieres solo a tu manera. Yo no soy santa. Tengo actitud, sí. No soy fácil pero te encanta porque te olvidas todo con la paradinha» ("You’re scared; you only want me your way. I’m no saint. I have attitude, yes. I’m not easy, but you love it, because you forget everything with my little dance").

== Recording and promotion ==
The song was recorded in New York City in a short period of time, since Anitta wanted to release the single by surprise, although portions of the song were leaked two days before its official release. She promoted the song in Mexico on the program "Tu night", by Mexican comedian and presenter Gabo Ramos, she also sang the Portuguese version of "Sim ou Não" with him. She was later on the show "Función" at Excélsior Televisión in Mexico. Speaking what is called "portuñol", the singer talked about her plans of a career singing in Spanish. The Brazilian version of Rolling Stone said the song represents another step in the international career of Anitta after releasing songs with Colombian singer Maluma and Australian rapper Iggy Azalea. On June 6, "Paradinha" was performed for the first time on television during the TV show Música Boa ao Vivo, which Anitta was also the host. On June 10, she performed it at Rede Globo's Caldeirão do Huck.

== Music video ==
The accompanying music video for "Paradinha" was filmed on May 24, 2017, in New York City. It was directed by Bruno Ilogti, with artistic direction by Giovanni Bianco, who also collaborated with Anitta on the music videos for her singles "Bang", "Essa Mina é Louca" and "Cravo e Canela". On the same day the first photos were released on social networks. The video also featured Brazilian model and Victoria's Secret Angel Lais Ribeiro, during the scenes in the laundry. The outfits worn by the singer were produced by American fashion consultant Patti Wilson, using pieces of the Balenciaga brand. The video brought sponsorship by the Cheetos snacks, which Anitta appears eating in a scene, and Samsung technology company, which used equipment and showed the backstage in the brand channel on YouTube. According to the director, the intention was to take Anitta from the comfort zone of studio superproductions, which she had previously been used to, and to make her interact with the different and real environments, surprising the audience.

Overall, there were seven locations in the music video and different outfits in almost all of them – on the supermarket scene, the singer wears sequin camouflage pants and a black top, on The Panna II Indian restaurant she appears singing underneath colored lights and ornate banners using a green cropped top and black panties, she's wearing braids, orange shorts and Balenciaga boots on the Greek restaurant Souvlaki Greek and on the alternative rock bar Arlene's Grocery scenes, both on the Lower East Side, She also shot on famous Katz's Delicatessen, made popular by the film When Harry Met Sally... (1989) in which she appears with zebra print cropped top, orange jacket and denim shorts, on the 2nd Avenue New York City Subway Station in Manhattan, Anitta appears in pink overalls and braids, and at laundromat in East Village, she appears in blue sport pants and a cut out top. The scenes are repeated constantly until the song is over.

== Charts ==
In Brazil, the song debuted at number two on Billboard Brasil's Hot Pop Songs chart, climbing to the top in the second week. Subsequently, it debuted at number 22 on the Brasil Hot 100 Airplay chart, peaking at number 3 so far, being the first single to enter the top 10 after "Bang", and her highest peak since "Ritmo Perfeito".

Weekly chart performance for "Paradinha"
Chart (2017)	Peak position
Brazil (Billboard Hot 100)	3
Brazil (Billboard Hot Pop & Popular)	1
Colombia (National-Report)	48
Ecuador (Monitor Latino Pop)	20
Ecuador (National-Report)	41
Mexico (Billboard Mexican Espanol Airplay)	25
Portugal (AFP)	54
Uruguay (Monitor Latino)	14

=== Year-end charts ===
Chart (2017)	Position
Brazil (Pro-Música Brasil)	20

== Certifications ==
Region	Certification	Certified units/sales
Portugal (AFP)	Platinum	10,000^{‡}
^{‡} Sales+streaming figures based on certification alone.

== Credits and personnel ==
Personnel

- Songwriting – Larissa Machado, Umberto Tavares, Jefferson Junior
- Production – Alexandre Delvás, Tavares, Junior
- Vocal producing and recording – Mário Cunha, Tavares
- Engineer – Mariana "Maná" Oliveria
