= Anitters =

Fandom of Anitta

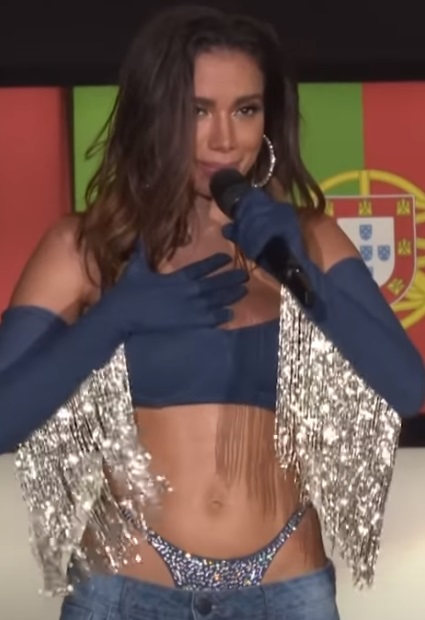
Anitta talking to her fandom during Rock in Rio 2022.

Anitters is the name of the fandom of Brazilian singer and songwriter Anitta. Known for their loyalty and willingness to defend the artist, the Anitters play a crucial role in the singer's successful career and are often referred to as the largest fandom in Brazil and one of the biggest in Latin America.

== Origin of the name ==
The term "Anitter" was popularized early in Anitta's career when the singer began gaining visibility on Twitter and other social media platforms. Her fans adopted the name as a way to collectively identify themselves, inspired by "ants". Since then, the term has become the official designation for her fan base.

== Activities and impact ==
The Anitters are particularly active during the release of singles and award shows, organizing virtual campaigns to boost Anitta's success on digital platforms. This organization also extends to voting campaigns for awards such as the MTV Europe Music Awards, MTV Video Music Awards, and Multishow Brazilian Music Awards, where fans frequently mobilize large numbers of votes to secure victories for the artist.

== StoryTold ==
To continue demonstrating their strength on social media, the fan club created its own platform called StoryTold, designed exclusively for Anitters, with strict participation criteria. The purpose of the platform is to allow fans to share their feelings and organize actions in support of the singer without interference from "haters" — people who spread hateful messages online. This new social network offers a space for posting texts and photos, providing a safe environment for the fan club.

=== Selection process for StoryTold ===
To prevent haters from using the app, individuals interested in creating a profile on StoryTold must fill out a form and undergo a sort of interview conducted by volunteer fans. The goal of this process is to ensure that the applicant is a genuine admirer of Anitta. "The interviews are conducted by fans who have volunteered... Some questions include: How long have you been a fan? Have you interacted with her? The history of their social media is also analyzed," explains Vinícius Paulino de Souza, project manager at the Virtual Business Assistance of Software Solutions (Avess), the company that developed the social network.

=== Investment and development of StoryTold ===
The team at Avess stated to g1 that they invested over R$ 400,000 to develop the first version of the app. This amount was taken from the company's own funds, without contributions from investors.

== Political influence ==
On May 5, 2020, Anitta mobilized the Anitters on her social media to take a stand against an amendment to Provisional Measure 948/20, proposed by federal deputy Felipe Carreras (PSB/PE). The MP addressed the losses in the culture and tourism sectors due to the COVID-19 pandemic, and Carreras's amendment suggested preventing the collection of royalties by any individual or legal entity other than the performer at public or private events.

After strong pressure from the artistic community and the Anitters, along with direct discussions with Anitta, the deputy backed down. On May 6, 2020, Carreras published an "Open Letter to the Artistic Community," in which he announced the withdrawal of the amendment, acknowledging that the proposal had caused misunderstandings.

On August 6, 2020, Anitta once again mobilized the Anitters to take a stand against a copyright regulation project that, according to her, would harm the artistic community. The singer used her social media to share a video of Deputy Isnaldo Bulhões (MDB-AL), announcing the vote on Bill 3968 of 1997. The project, authored by Serafim Venzon (PDT), proposes to exempt public bodies and philanthropic entities from paying copyright for the use of musical works at events. Responding to Anitta's appeal, the Anitters engaged actively, using their social media to pressure Congress against the approval of the project.

Anitta stood out for her political influence in 2022, becoming one of the most influential figures in Brazilian politics. She took a stance against former far-right president Jair Bolsonaro and openly supported candidate Lula. Anitta encouraged Anitters aged 16 to 18 to regularize their voter registration, contributing to the registration of over 2 million teenagers. The singer urged her fans to promote the regularization of voter registration, resulting in the Superior Electoral Court reaching historic records for voter regularization, with over 8.5 million requests for assistance regarding electoral status.

On September 26, 2022, Anitta's fans also demonstrated their influence outside the music field by boosting an event supporting then-presidential candidate Luiz Inácio Lula da Silva (PT). The event, called Super Live Brasil da Esperança, was held at the Celso Furtado Auditorium in Anhembi, São Paulo, gathering hundreds of celebrities, influencers, artists, politicians, and intellectuals. Even without Anitta's physical presence, representatives from the singer's fan clubs attended and significantly contributed to the event's impact on social media.

During the simultaneous broadcast of the event on YouTube and social media, six phrases related to the event appeared in the Trending Topics on Twitter, including the hashtag #BrasilDaEsperança, which reached the top positions among the most discussed topics on the platform. This engagement from the Anitters reflects the mobilizing power of Anitta's fanbase, which has proven to be active even in political causes.

The Anitters mobilized on social media on June 11, 2024, in opposition to a bill that seeks to equate abortion after the 22nd week of gestation with the crime of homicide. The proposal, presented by federal deputy Sóstenes Cavalcante (PL-RJ), also aims to restrict the right to abortion even in cases of rape. The bill was scheduled for a vote in the Chamber of Deputies on the same day. The initiative to involve fan clubs came from federal deputy Erika Hilton (PSOL-SP), who sought support to amplify opposition to the bill. The Anitters' profiles, along with other fan clubs, shared a link promoting a petition against the approval of the bill.

On June 16, 2024, singer Anitta criticized the President of the Chamber, Arthur Lira, regarding the Amnesty PEC. In an Instagram post, she commented: "Tomorrow, a new absurdity will be debated in the Chamber. This PEC wants to forgive the fines of parties that do not follow the rules of having the correct percentage of women, Black, and Indigenous candidates. Furthermore, they want to reduce this minimum percentage. These are the people we need in the decisions of our country". The Anitters quickly mobilized on social media following Anitta's criticism of the PEC. Answering the artist's call, fans joined a campaign against the PEC, using their social media platforms to amplify the message. Anitta emphasized the importance of fan participation, stating: "Social media is our voice, and the voice of the people is what truly changes politics. When we unite and use our networks, we make a difference".

== Defense of the artist and influence on social media ==
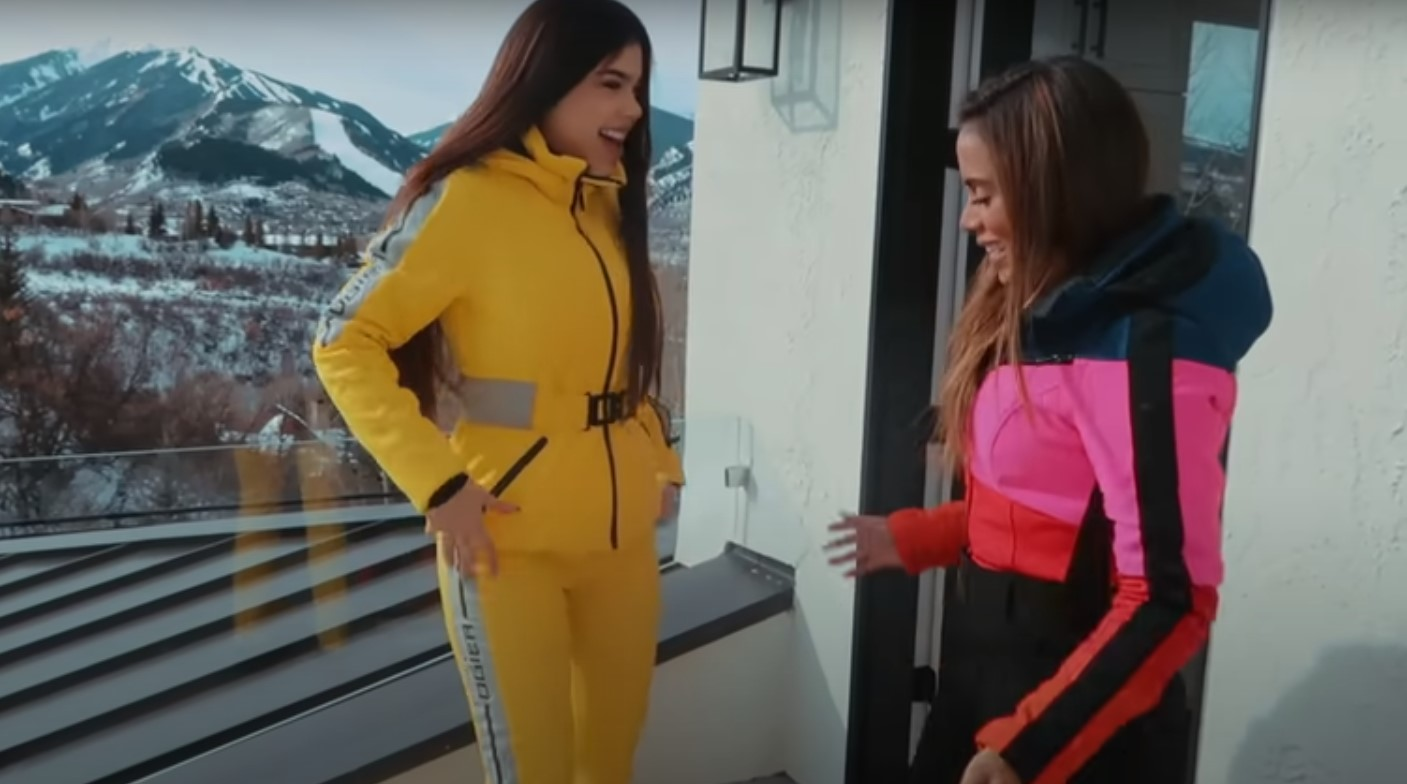
Anitta with Mexican singer and fan, Kenia Os.

In addition to promoting Anitta's career, the Anitters are known for their protective stance and vigorous reactions to criticism directed at the singer. Loyal admirers, they quickly mobilize to respond to any negative or dismissive comments regarding the artist's work. One example of this behavior occurred with influencer João Pedro, known as the “Gringo Carioca,” who became a target of the Anitters after stating that Anitta was "responsible for the sexualization of Brazilian women in the U.S.". The digital content creator had his TikTok account, which had over 1.4 million followers, banned after the singer's fans reported his profile en masse, claiming he was violating the platform's guidelines.

In a video where he appeared crying and visibly distressed, João Pedro blamed the Anitters for losing what he referred to as "a year of hard work." According to him, the reports made by Anitta's fans led to the banning of his account on the social media platform, directly impacting his journey as an influencer.

The Anitters have publicly feuded with various artists, such as Ludmilla, Sam Smith, Tinashe, and Iggy Azalea. This behavior has been condemned by the singer, who has spoken out multiple times about her disagreement with such attacks on other artists.

== Warner Music ==
The tension between Anitta and her former label, Warner Music, had become one of the most popular topics on social media after the singer joked on Twitter that she would even sell her organs to get out of her contract. In support of the singer, the Anitters raised the hashtag "Free Anitta", protesting the dissatisfaction expressed by the artist. From that point on, fans organized and held daily campaigns on Twitter, Instagram, and LinkedIn to break the singer's contract with the label.

On March 17, 2023, which is also Fan Day, Anitters gathered in protest outside the Warner Music Brasil headquarters in Barra da Tijuca, west of Rio de Janeiro. The movement was organized through social media and elevated the hashtag "Warner Is Over Party" to the top of Twitter's global trending topics. According to Monique Souza, one of the attendees, the demonstration was peaceful, and the label released employees early. "Many were already leaving because Warner saw everything on Twitter. When they realized the impact, the label closed early", she detailed.

== Sertanejo Congressional Inquiry ==
In February 2021, a video of Anitta getting an intimate tattoo, which supposedly said "love" or "I love you," was leaked online, causing a significant stir among the public and her fans. In May 2022, the tattoo became the target of criticism from Zé Neto, of the sertanejo duo Zé Neto & Cristiano, during a show. He insinuated that he didn't need resources from the Rouanet Law or a tattoo on his "toba" to show success, in a clear reference to Anitta. This comment sparked outrage among Anitters, who quickly reacted on social media.

The mobilization of Anitters went beyond just defending the singer. They began to expose the million-dollar contracts that sertanejo artists, including Zé Neto and others, had with small-town city halls, leading to the establishment of the so-called "CPI dos Sertanejos" (Sertanejo Congressional Inquiry). This investigation focused on the use of public funds for sertanejo concerts, revealing exorbitant figures and suspicious contracts, with one of the main targets being Gusttavo Lima, a supporter of Jair Bolsonaro.

The crisis in the sertanejo world intensified with the opening of inquiries by the Public Prosecutor's Office. In response to the criticisms, Gusttavo held a live broadcast to explain himself, crying and lamenting the investigations. During the broadcast, Zé Neto left supportive comments, saying, "The one who needs to explain himself is me, brother. I'm going through a tough time; I'm your brother. You don't need to explain yourself; just pass it on to me. It has nothing to do with you".

The pressure from Anitta's fans helped bring visibility to the case, triggering a series of investigations and cancellations of shows funded by public resources. Following the negative backlash and exposure of the contracts, Zé Neto apologized to Anitta and the Anitters, admitting that he regretted his comment.

The controversy gained even more international attention when the American magazine Billboard published an article about the case in June 2022, highlighting the impact of the Anitters in addressing this issue.

== Awards and nominations ==
Year	Award	Category	Result	Ref.
2021	Flame Roem World Awards	National Fandom of the Year	Nominated	
2020	Latin Music Italian Awards	Best Latin Fandom	Won	
2018	MTV Millennial Awards BraZil	Fandom of the Year	Nominated	
2019	MTV Millennial Awards BraZil	Fandom of the Year	Nominated	
2020	MTV Millennial Awards BraZil	Fandom of the Year	Nominated	
2021	MTV Millennial Awards BraZil	Fandom of the Year	Nominated	
2024	MTV MIAW Awards	Fandom del Año	Nominated	
2018	Meus Prêmios Nick	Fandom of the Year	Nominated	
2019	Meus Prêmios Nick	Fandom of the Year	Nominated	
2017	Prêmio Gshow	Fandom of the Year	Nominated	
2018	Prêmio Gshow	Fandom of the Year	Nominated	
2022	Prêmio iBest	Fandom Brazil	Won	
2022	Prêmio iBest	Music Fandom	Won	
2023	Prêmio iBest	Music Fandom	Top 3	
2018	Prêmio Jovem Brasileiro	Best Fandom in Brazil	Won	
2020	Prêmio Jovem Brasileiro	Best Fandom	Nominated	
2021	Prêmio TodaTeen	Fandom of the Year	Nominated	
2020	Prêmio POP Mais	Fandom of the Year	Won	
2021	Prêmio POP Mais	Best Fandom	Nominated	
2023	MTV Europe Music Awards	Biggest Fans	Canceled	
2024	MTV Europe Music Awards	Biggest Fans	Pending	
2021	SEC Awards	Fandom of the Year	Nominated	
2022	SEC Awards	Fandom of the Year	Nominated	
2019	Urban Music Awards	Mejor Club de Fans	Pending	

== Relation with Anitta ==
Anitta maintains a close relationship with the Anitters, often recognizing the importance of her fans for her career and defending them. The artist frequently interacts with them on social media and has mentioned them in interviews and award shows, highlighting the support and strength of her fan base as an essential part of her journey. However, she has also been in conflict with her fans at times, especially regarding the treatment of other artists. The Anitters have gone on strike at various moments, movements made to draw the singer's attention to certain issues that she tends to ignore.
