= Joga Pra Lua =

Single by Anitta, Dennis DJ, and Pedro Sampaio

from the album Funk Generation
- Released: December 15, 2023.
- Genre: Funk carioca, EDM
- Length: 2:04
- Label: Floresta; Republic; Universal Latin Entertainment
- Composers: Pedro Sampaio; Dennis DJ; Fernando Ps; Gabriel Cantini; Shylton Fernandes
- Producers: Dennis; Sampaio

"Joga Pra Lua" (transl. Throw it to the Moon) is a song released by Brazilian musical artists Anitta, Dennis DJ and Pedro Sampaio. The song was recorded for Anitta's sixth studio album, Funk Generation (2024). It was released as the third single from the album on December 15, 2023, through Floresta Records, Universal Latin Entertainment, and Republic Records. "Joga Pra Lua" is a funk carioca and EDM track, and its lyrics focus on sexual attraction within baile funk.

In 2024, "Joga Pra Lua" received a nomination at the 25th Annual Latin Grammy Awards for Best Portuguese-Language Urban Performance It was later certified diamond by Pro-Música Brasil, for having 300,000 copies distributed.

== Live performances ==
Anitta performed "Joga Pra Lua" solo during an appearance on the variety show, Domingão com Huck, on 16 February 2024.

== Awards and nominations ==
| Year | Awards ceremony | Award | Results | Ref. |
|---|---|---|---|---|
| 2024 | Latin Grammy Awards | Best Portuguese-Language Urban Performance | Nominated | |
| 2024 | TVZ Music Video of the Year | Funk of the Year | Won | |

== Charts ==
Chart performance for "Joga Pra Lua"
| Chart (2024) | Peak position |
|---|---|
| Brazil Hot 100 (Billboard) | 17 |
| Portugal (AFP) | 48 |

== Certifications ==
Certifications for "Joga pra Lua"
| Region | Certification | Certified units/sales |
|---|---|---|
| Brazil (Pro-Música Brasil) | Diamond | 300,000^{‡} |
^{*} Sales figures based on certification alone.^{^} Shipments figures based on certification alone.
