= Machika =

Single by J Balvin, Jeon and Anitta

from the album Vibras
- Released: 19 January 2018
- Recorded: 2017
- Genre: Reggaeton
- Length: 3:01
- Label: Capitol; Universal Latin
- Songwriters: José Balvin; Larissa Machado; Alejandro Ramírez; Clyde Sergio Narain; Jonathan Bryan Thiel (jeon)
- Producers: Chuckie; ChildsPlay

J Balvin singles chronology
"Bum Bum Tam Tam (Remix)" (2017)	"Machika" (2018)	"Ahora" (2018)

Jeon singles chronology
"Cubo So" (2017)	"Machika" (2018)

Anitta singles chronology
"Vai Malandra" (2017)	"Machika" (2018)	"Indecente" (2018)

Music video
- "Machika" on YouTube

"Machika" (presumed to mean "smash" in the Papiamento language) is a song recorded by Colombian singer J Balvin, Aruban singer Jeon and Brazilian singer Anitta. It was released as a single on 19 January 2018 through Capitol Records and Universal Music Latin from Balvin's studio album Vibras. The song was written by Balvin, Jeon and Anitta together with producer Sky Rompiendo. The song is produced by Clyde Narain and CHILDSPLAY.

== Music video ==
Directed by 36 Grados, the accompanying music video premiered on Vevo the same day of the single release. It features a post-apocalyptic setting.

== Live performances ==
J Balvin and Jeon Arvani first performed the song together at the Calibash festival in Los Angeles, without Anitta. Anitta later performed the song at the Festival Planeta Atlântida in Brazil.

== Remixes ==
An EDM remix of the song by American DJ Dillon Francis was released on 30 March 2018. On 31 May 2018, a multilingual remix featuring artists G-Eazy, Sfera Ebbasta, MC Fioti and Duki was released.

== Track listing ==
Digital download

1. "Machika" – 3:02

== Credits and personnel ==
- Vocals – J Balvin, Jeon, Anitta
- Songwriting – J Balvin, Jeon, Anitta, Sky Rompiendo, Clyde Sergio Narain
- Production – Chuckie, CHILDSPLAY

== Charts ==
=== Weekly charts ===
Chart (2018)	Peak position
Argentina (Monitor Latino)	17
Brazil (Billboard Hot 100)	99
Belgium (Ultratip Bubbling Under Wallonia)	29
Bolivia (Monitor Latino)	17
Chile Urbano (Monitor Latino)	15
Colombia (Monitor Latino)	1
Colombia (National-Report)	1
Costa Rica (Monitor Latino)	16
Dominican Republic (Monitor Latino)	17
Ecuador (Monitor Latino)	1
Ecuador (National-Report)	5
El Salvador (Monitor Latino)	10
France (SNEP)	185
Guatemala (Monitor Latino)	7
Honduras (Monitor Latino)	3
Italy (FIMI)	14
Mexico (Billboard Mexican Airplay)	45
Nicaragua (Monitor Latino)	3
Panama (Monitor Latino)	6
Paraguay (Monitor Latino)	14
Peru (Monitor Latino)	4
Portugal (AFP)	32
Spain (PROMUSICAE)	14
Switzerland (Schweizer Hitparade)	94
US Bubbling Under Hot 100 (Billboard)	16
US Hot Latin Songs (Billboard)	10
US Latin Airplay (Billboard)	1
US Latin Rhythm Airplay (Billboard)	1
Venezuela (National-Report)	22

=== Year-end charts ===
Chart (2018)	Position
Argentina (Monitor Latino)	80
Bolivia (Monitor Latino)	86
Chile Urbano (Monitor Latino)	58
Colombia (Monitor Latino)	30
Costa Rica (Monitor Latino)	44
Dominican Republic (Monitor Latino)	80
Ecuador (Monitor Latino)	48
El Salvador (Monitor Latino)	81
Guatemala (Monitor Latino)	25
Honduras (Monitor Latino)	15
Mexico Pop (Monitor Latino)	46
Nicaragua (Monitor Latino)	22
Panama (Monitor Latino)	46
Paraguay (Monitor Latino)	99
Peru (Monitor Latino)	22
Portugal (AFP)	175
US Hot Latin Songs (Billboard)	40
US Latin Airplay (Billboard)	36
US Latin Pop Airplay Songs (Billboard)	35
US Latin Pop Songs (Billboard)	35
Venezuela (Monitor Latino)	98

== Certifications ==
Region	Certification	Certified units/sales
Brazil (Pro-Música Brasil)	Diamond	160,000^{‡}
Italy (FIMI)	Platinum	50,000^{‡}
Mexico (AMPROFON)	Platinum	60,000^{‡}
Portugal (AFP)	Gold	5,000^{‡}
Spain (Promusicae)	Gold	20,000^{‡}
United States (RIAA)	Platinum (Latin)	60,000^{‡}
^{‡} Sales+streaming figures based on certification alone.

== See also ==
- List of Billboard number-one Latin songs of 2018
