= Indecente =

Single by Anitta
- Language: Spanish
- Released: March 26, 2018
- Recorded: 2018
- Genre: Reggae; Latin pop
- Length: 3:25
- Label: Warner Brasil
- Songwriters: Anitta; DJ Yuri Martins; Bigram John Zayas; Fuego; Luyo; Justin Quiles
- Producers: DJ Yuri Martins; DVLP; Josh Gudwin

Anitta singles chronology
"Machika" (2018)	"Indecente" (2018)	"Romance com Safadeza" (2018)

Music video
- "Indecente" on YouTube

"Indecente" (transl. "Indecent") is a Spanish song by Brazilian singer Anitta. It was released on March 26, 2018, along with its music video, filmed live and sponsored by O Boticário.

== Composition and recording ==
On March 22, 2018, the singer announced the release of the single "Indecente", which was a collaboration with DJ Yuri Martins, DVLP, Fuego, Luyo, and Justin Quiles. DJ Yuri Martins, DVLP, and Josh Gudwin are cited as producers of the track. The cover art is a portrait of Anitta taken by Gil Inoue with a collage work done by graphic designer Romeu Silva.

== Music video ==
Screen shots of the "Indecente" video.

The music video was directed by Bruno Ilogti and recorded directly from the singer's birthday party. Although Anitta announced that the project would be recorded live at the same time it was transmitted to the internet, the video was released two hours after it was streamed and although the video remained uncut, the lighting was edited. Anitta revealed that the inspiration of the video came from Gwen Stefani's "Make Me Like You" music video, which was recorded live backstage at the Grammy Awards.

Anitta's costume was selected by stylist Daniel Ueda and inspired by the fashion of the 1970s and 80s, especially by the costumes of girl group As Frenéticas, the first pop artists in Brazil. In the video, Anitta runs around her party singing, and meets guests along the way, including singers Pabllo Vittar, Nego do Borel, Jojo Maronttini, Di Ferrero, Kelly Key, Gabriel, o Pensador and Mateus Carrilho, the presenter Luisa Mell, the models Isabeli Fontana and Izabel Goulart, television personalities Arthur Aguiar and Maíra Cardi, the blogger David Brazil, as well as her own husband, Thiago Magalhães, whom she kisses at the end.

== Commercial performance ==
"Indecente" reached number one on the Brazilian iTunes Store an hour after its release.

== Track listing ==
Digital download
No.	Title	Writer(s)	Length
1.	"Indecente"	Larissa Machado; DJ Yuri Martins; Bigram John Zayas; Fuego; Luyo; Justin Quiles	3:25

== Credits ==
Credits adapted from Deezer.

- Anitta – composition, vocals
- DJ Yuri Martins – composition, production
- DVLP – composition, production
- Fuego – composition
- Josh Gudwin – production
- Justin Quiles – composition
- Luyo – composition

== Charts ==
Chart performance for "Indecente"
Chart (2018)	Peak position
Brazil (Billboard Hot 100)	39
Brazil Hot Pop Songs (Billboard)	1
Brazil Hot Streaming (Pro-Música Brasil)	6
Mexico Espanol Airplay (Billboard)	48
Portugal (AFP)	58

== Certifications ==
Region	Certification	Certified units/sales
Portugal (AFP)	Gold	5,000^{‡}
United States (RIAA)	Gold (Latin)	30,000^{‡}
^{‡} Sales+streaming figures based on certification alone.
