= 2014 Multishow Brazilian Music Awards =

21st edition of the Multishow Brazilian Music Awards held in 2014

- Date: 28 October 2014
- Location: HSBC Arena; Rio de Janeiro, Rio de Janeiro, Brazil
- Hosted by: Ivete Sangalo; Paulo Gustavo; Tatá Werneck; Didi Wagner

Highlights
- Most awards: Luan Santana; Thiaguinho; Banda do Mar (2 each)
- Most nominations: Luan Santana (4)
- Website: gshow.globo.com/multishow/premio-multishow

Television/radio coverage
- Network: Multishow

The 2014 Multishow Brazilian Music Awards (Portuguese: Prêmio Multishow de Música Brasileira 2014) (or simply 2014 Multishow Awards) (Portuguese: Prêmio Multishow 2014) was held on 28 October 2014, at the HSBC Arena in Rio de Janeiro, Brazil. Ivete Sangalo, Paulo Gustavo, Tatá Werneck and Didi Wagner hosted the ceremony.

Luan Santana received the most nominations with four. Santana, Thiaguinho and Banda do Mar received the most awards with two each.

== Winners and nominees ==
Winners appear first and highlighted in bold.

=== Voted categories ===
The winners of the following categories were chosen by fan votes.

Best Male Singer	Best Female Singer
**Thiaguinho**; Diogo Nogueira; Luan Santana; Lulu Santos; Nando Reis	**Paula Fernandes**; Claudia Leitte; Ivete Sangalo; Marisa Monte; Pitty
Best Group	Best Show
**Sorriso Maroto**; Skank; Oba Oba Samba House; O Rappa; Turma do Pagode	**Ivete Sangalo**; Luan Santana; Paula Fernandes; Só Pra Contrariar; Thiaguinho
Best Song	Earworm Song
**"Tudo Que Você Quiser" – Luan Santana**; "Auto-Reverse" – O Rappa; "Mandou Bem" – Jota Quest; "Não Fui Eu" – Paula Fernandes; "Zen" – Anitta	**"Caraca, Muleke" – Thiaguinho**; "Beijinho no Ombro" – Valesca Popozuda; "Cê Topa?" – Luan Santana; "Lepo Lepo" – Psirico; "País do Futebol" – MC Guimê (featuring Emicida)
Try It	Best TVZ Music Video
**Sam Alves**; MC Gui; Mika; Pedro Baby; Sophia Abrahão	**"Te Esperando" – Luan Santana**; "Beijinho no Ombro" – Valesca Popozuda; "Na Batida" – Anitta; "País do Futebol" – MC Guimê (featuring Emicida); "Waiting for You" – Jota Quest

=== Professional categories ===
The winners of the following categories are chosen by members of the music industry.

Best Album	New Song
**Banda do Mar – Banda do Mar**; O Terno – O Terno; Vista pro Mar – Silva	**"Sentimento" – Mahmundi**; "Pala Noturna" – Sexy Fi; "SMS" – Marcelo Jeneci
New Artist	New Hit
**Boogarins**; Alice Caymmi; Russo Passapusso	**"Mais Ninguém" – Banda do Mar**; "Funk dos Bromânticos" – Lucas Santtana; "Picada Fatal" – MC Livinho
Version of the Year	Best Music Video
**"Homem" – Alice Caymmi**; "Dom Dom Dom" – Omulu; "Estrada do Sol" – Nina Becker	**"Vida Loka" – Bonde do Rolê**; "Duas de Cinco + Cóccix-ência" – Criolo; "Mais Ninguém" – Banda do Mar
Shared Song	Best Show
**"Encarnado" – Juçara Marçal**; "O Terno" – O Terno; "Paraíso da Miragem" – Russo Passapusso	**Turnê 25 Anos – Racionais MC's**; Turnê Atento aos Sinais – Ney Matogrosso; Turnê Gilbertos Samba – Gilberto Gil
