= X Factor (Brazilian TV series) season 1 =

X Factor
- Season 1
- Hosted by: Fernanda Paes Leme
- Judges: Rick Bonadio; Alinne Rosa; Di Ferrero; Paulo Miklos
- Winner: Cristopher Clark
- Winning mentor: Rick Bonadio
- Runner-up: Jenni Mosello

Release
- Original network: Band; TNT
- Original release: August 29 – November 23, 2016

The first season of the Brazilian version of the music competition show X Factor premiered on Monday, August 29, 2016 at 10:30 p.m. (BRT/AMT) on Band, with reruns airing the following day at 8:30/7:30 p.m. (BRT/AMT) on TNT.

Based on the British format, the competition consists of auditions, in front of producers and then the judges with a live audience; boot camp; four-chair challenge and then the live finals.

The original judging panel consisted of Rick Bonadio, Alinne Rosa, Di Ferrero and Paulo Miklos, with Fernanda Paes Leme as main host and Mauricio Meirelles as social media correspondent.

An early preview of X Factor aired following Band's broadcast of the season finale of the third season of MasterChef on August 24, 2016.

== Selection process ==
Season 1 judges

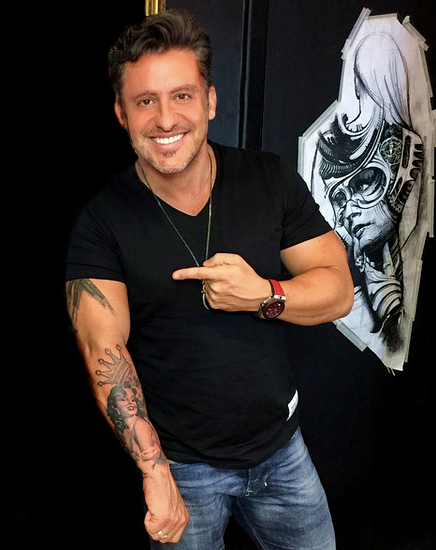
Rick Bonadio

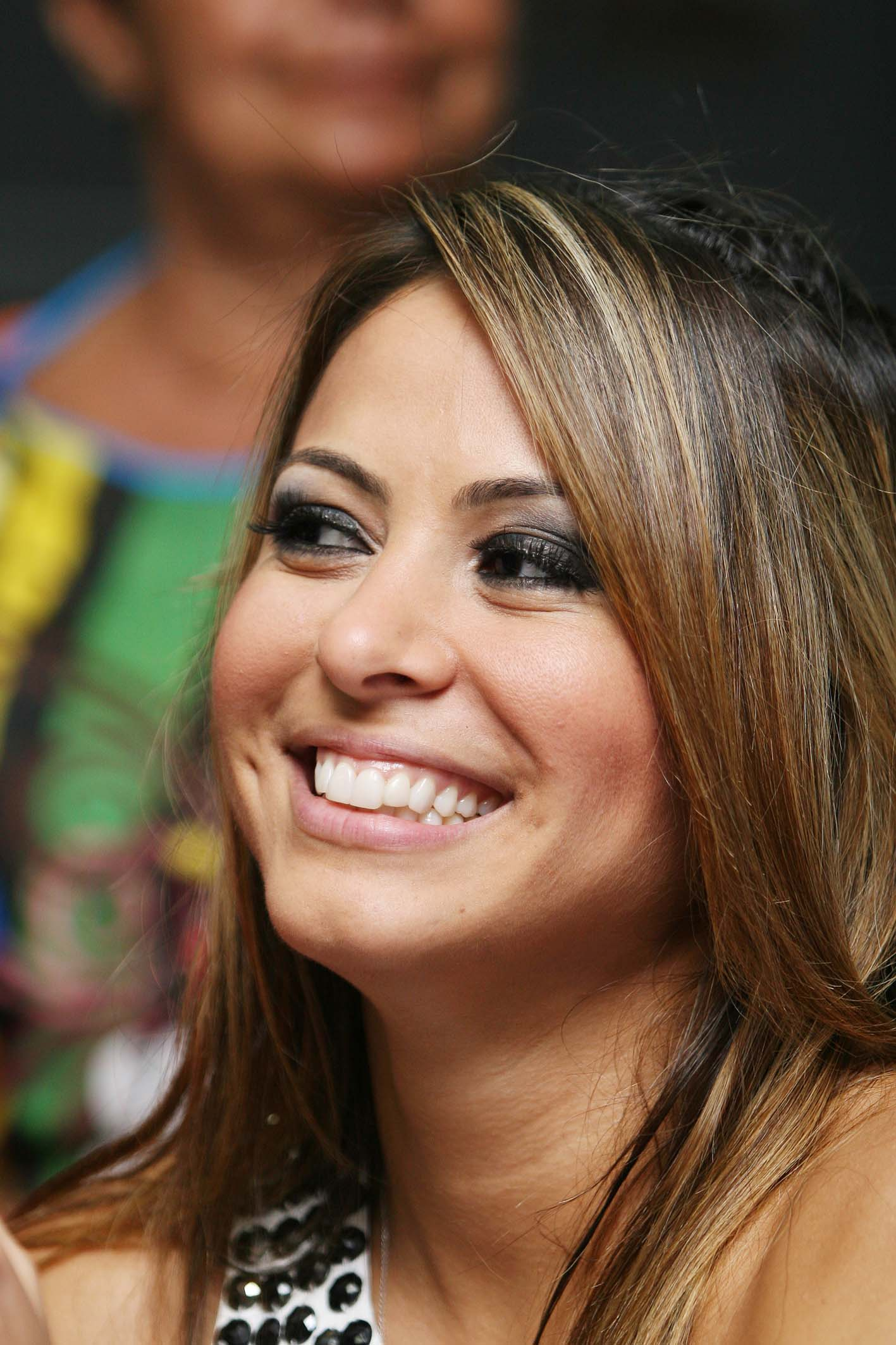
Alinne Rosa

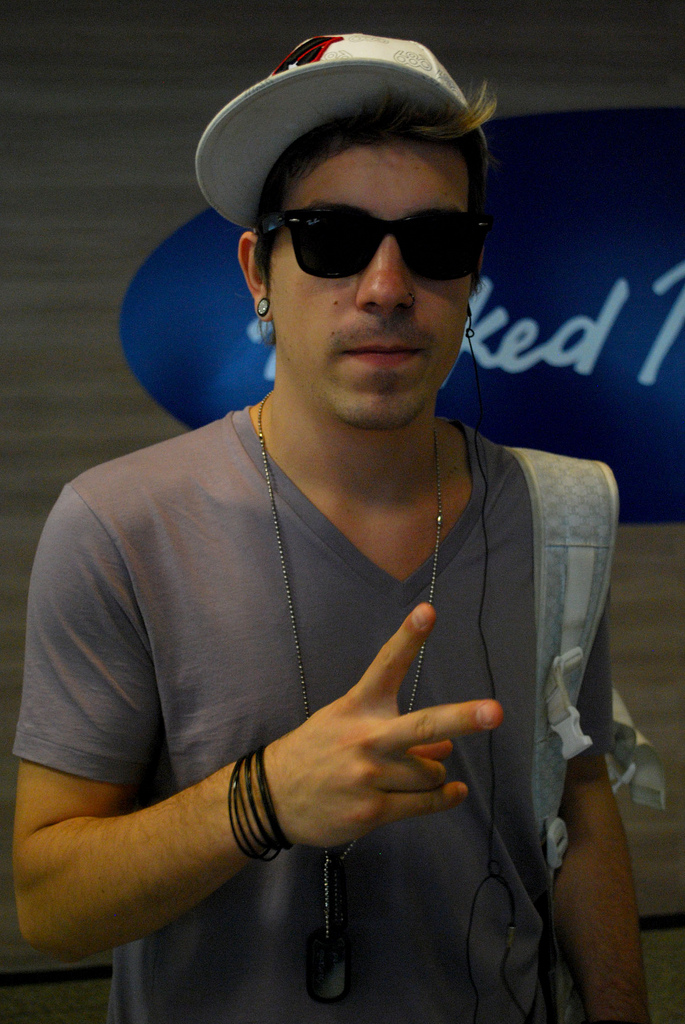
Di Ferrero

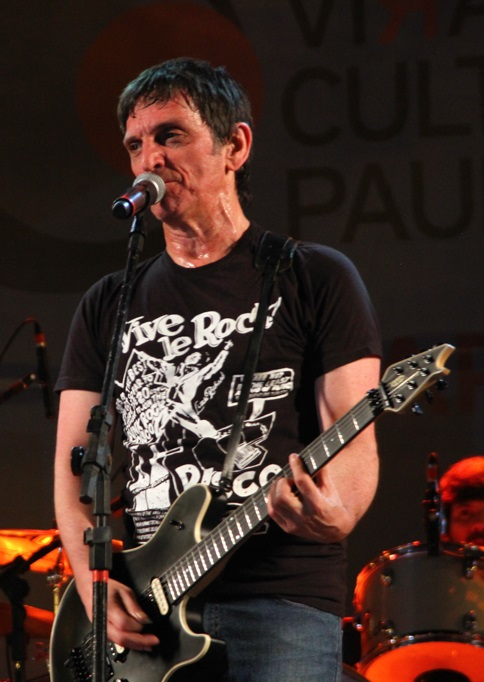
Paulo Miklos

=== Auditions ===
Open auditions in front of the show's producers took place at the Arena Corinthians, São Paulo from July 9 to July 10, 2016.

Band network reported that over 30,000 people auditioned for the show.

=== Judges' auditions ===
Judges' auditions took place at the Dom Bosco Theatre on Colégio Salesiano Santa Teresinha, São Paulo from July 25 to July 29, 2016.

=== Bootcamp ===
Summary of bootcamp
| Judge | Category | Location | Assistant | Source |
|---|---|---|---|---|
| Paulo Miklos | Groups | Mavsa Resort, Cesário Lange | Fernanda Abreu | |
| Di Ferrero | Boys | Mavsa Resort, Cesário Lange | Péricles | |
| Alinne Rosa | Girls | Mavsa Resort, Cesário Lange | Tiago Iorc | |
| Rick Bonadio | Over 25s | Mavsa Resort, Cesário Lange | Ludmilla | |

=== Four-chair challenge ===
Key
– Contestant was immediately eliminated after performance without switch
– Contestant was switched out later in the competition and eventually eliminated
– Contestant was not switched out and made the final four of their own category

Contestants performances on the four-chair challenge
| Episode | Category (mentor) | Act | Order | Song | Mentor's decision | Switched with |
|---|---|---|---|---|---|---|
| Episode 13 (October 10) | Over 25s (Bonadio) | Tamires Alves | 1 | "I Have Nothing" | Put in chair 1 | — |
| Episode 13 (October 10) | Over 25s (Bonadio) | Dan Murata | 2 | "Hold It Against Me" | Eliminated | — |
| Episode 13 (October 10) | Over 25s (Bonadio) | Tainah | 3 | "De Volta pro Aconchego" | Put in chair 2 | Cecília Militão |
| Episode 13 (October 10) | Over 25s (Bonadio) | Paulo Cremona | 4 | "Melhor Eu Ir" | Put in chair 3 | Camille Rio Lima |
| Episode 13 (October 10) | Over 25s (Bonadio) | Amanda Döring | 5 | "Zero" | Eliminated | — |
| Episode 13 (October 10) | Over 25s (Bonadio) | Prih Queiroz | 6 | "Lilás" | Put in chair 4 | — |
| Episode 13 (October 10) | Over 25s (Bonadio) | Cecília Militão | 7 | "Você" | Put in chair 2 | Rafael Oliveira |
| Episode 13 (October 10) | Over 25s (Bonadio) | Camille Rio Lima | 8 | "And I Am Telling You I'm Not Going" | Put in chair 3 | Cristopher Clark |
| Episode 13 (October 10) | Over 25s (Bonadio) | Rafael Oliveira | 9 | "1+1" | Put in chair 2 | — |
| Episode 13 (October 10) | Over 25s (Bonadio) | Cristopher Clark | 10 | "Set Fire to the Rain" | Put in chair 3 | — |
| Episode 14 (October 12) | Boys (Ferrero) | Igor Black | 11 | "É Isso Aí" | Put in chair 1 | Eli |
| Episode 14 (October 12) | Boys (Ferrero) | Lucas Machado | 12 | "O Vento" | Eliminated | — |
| Episode 14 (October 12) | Boys (Ferrero) | Octávio Augusto | 13 | "A Estrada" | Put in chair 2 | Miguel EV |
| Episode 14 (October 12) | Boys (Ferrero) | Diego Martins | 14 | "Bang Bang" feat. "Bang" | Put in chair 3 | — |
| Episode 14 (October 12) | Boys (Ferrero) | Alessandro Maia | 15 | "Os Corações Não São Iguais" | Put in chair 4 | Conrado Bragança |
| Episode 14 (October 12) | Boys (Ferrero) | Eli | 16 | "Wrecking Ball" | Put in chair 1 | — |
| Episode 14 (October 12) | Boys (Ferrero) | Luan Lacerda | 17 | "Chão de Giz" | Eliminated | — |
| Episode 14 (October 12) | Boys (Ferrero) | Conrado Bragança | 18 | "Far Away" | Put in chair 4 | — |
| Episode 14 (October 12) | Boys (Ferrero) | Lucas Nage | 19 | "Stitches" | Eliminated | — |
| Episode 14 (October 12) | Boys (Ferrero) | Miguel EV | 20 | "When We Were Young" | Put in chair 2 | — |
| Episode 15 (October 17) | Girls (Rosa) | Naomi Dominguez | 21 | "Sweet Child o' Mine" | Put in chair 1 | — |
| Episode 15 (October 17) | Girls (Rosa) | Carol Sampaio | 22 | "It's a Man's Man's Man's World" | Put in chair 2 | Ariane Villa Lobos |
| Episode 15 (October 17) | Girls (Rosa) | May | 23 | "Ain't No Other Man" | Eliminated | — |
| Episode 15 (October 17) | Girls (Rosa) | Ciana | 24 | "Quem De Nós Dois" | Eliminated | — |
| Episode 15 (October 17) | Girls (Rosa) | V Killer | 25 | "Velha Roupa Colorida" | Put in chair 3 | Heloá Holanda |
| Episode 15 (October 17) | Girls (Rosa) | Marcela Bueno | 26 | "Fora da Lei" | Put in chair 4 | Jenni Mosello |
| Episode 15 (October 17) | Girls (Rosa) | Jenni Mosello | 27 | "Piloto Automático" | Put in chair 4 | — |
| Episode 15 (October 17) | Girls (Rosa) | Ariane Villa Lobos | 28 | "Crazy" | Put in chair 2 | — |
| Episode 15 (October 17) | Girls (Rosa) | Bruna Pires | 29 | "A História de Lily Braun" | Eliminated | — |
| Episode 15 (October 17) | Girls (Rosa) | Heloá Holanda | 30 | "Stay with Me" | Put in chair 3 | — |
| Episode 16 (October 19) | Groups (Miklos) | Zennus | 31 | "When I Grow Up" | Eliminated | — |
| Episode 16 (October 19) | Groups (Miklos) | Dó Maior | 32 | "O Xote das Meninas" | Put in chair 1 | Ravena |
| Episode 16 (October 19) | Groups (Miklos) | Dupla da Paulista | 33 | "Man! I Feel Like a Woman!" | Eliminated | — |
| Episode 16 (October 19) | Groups (Miklos) | Andrew & Maylon | 34 | "Então Foge" | Put in chair 2 | Valter Jr. & Vinícius |
| Episode 16 (October 19) | Groups (Miklos) | Ônix | 35 | "Gaveta" | Eliminated | — |
| Episode 16 (October 19) | Groups (Miklos) | A's Trinca | 36 | "Só os Loucos Sabem" | Put in chair 3 | O Clã |
| Episode 16 (October 19) | Groups (Miklos) | TropeirÁfrica | 37 | "Shekini" | Put in chair 4 | — |
| Episode 16 (October 19) | Groups (Miklos) | Valter Jr. & Vinicius | 38 | "No Rancho Fundo" | Put in chair 2 | — |
| Episode 16 (October 19) | Groups (Miklos) | Ravena | 39 | "Não Para" | Put in chair 1 | — |
| Episode 16 (October 19) | Groups (Miklos) | O Clã | 40 | "Quando o DJ Mandar" | Put in chair 3 | — |

Contestants The top 16 contestants were confirmed as follows:

Key
– Winner
– Runner-up
– Third place

| Category (mentor) | Acts | | | |
|---|---|---|---|---|
| Boys (Ferrero) | Conrado Bragança | Diego Martins | Eli | Miguel EV |
| Girls (Rosa) | Ariane Villa Lobos | Heloá Holanda | Jenni Mosello | Naomi Dominguez |
| Over 25s (Bonadio) | Cristopher Clark | Rafael Oliveira | Prih Queiroz | Tamires Alves |
| Groups (Miklos) | O Clã | Ravena | TropeirÁfrica | Valter Jr. & Vinicius |

== Live shows ==
=== Results summary ===
Key
– Contestant did not perform
– Contestant was chosen as the bottom four by their mentor and had to sing again in the final showdown
– Contestant was in the bottom three and had to sing again in the final showdown
– Contestant was in the bottom three but received the fewest votes and was immediately eliminated
– Contestant received the fewest public votes and was immediately eliminated (no final showdown)
– Contestant received the most public votes

Weekly results per contestant
| Contestant | Week 1 | | Week 2 | Week 3 | Week 4 | Week 5 | | |
| Contestant | Monday | Wednesday | Week 2 | Week 3 | Week 4 | Monday | Wednesday | |
| Contestant | Monday | Wednesday | Week 2 | Week 3 | Week 4 | Monday | Round 1 | Round 2 |
|---|---|---|---|---|---|---|---|---|
| Cristopher Clark | Saved | —N/a | Safe | Safe | Safe | Safe | Safe | Winner (week 5) |
| Jenni Mosello | —N/a | Saved | Safe | Safe | 4th | Safe | Safe | Runner-up (week 5) |
| Ravena | Saved | —N/a | Safe | Safe | Safe | Bottom two | 3rd | Eliminated (week 5) |
| Conrado Bragança | Saved | —N/a | Safe | Safe | Safe | Bottom two | Eliminated (week 5) | |
| Heloá Holanda | Saved | —N/a | Safe | Bottom three | 5th | Eliminated (week 4) | | |
| Diego Martins | —N/a | Bottom four | 8th | Safe | 6th | Eliminated (week 4) | | |
| Naomi Dominguez | Bottom four | —N/a | Safe | Bottom three | Eliminated (week 3) | | | |
| Miguel EV | —N/a | Saved | Safe | 8th | Eliminated (week 3) | | | |
| Valter Jr. & Vinicius | —N/a | Saved | 9th | Eliminated (week 2) | | | | |
| Rafael Oliveira | —N/a | Saved | 10th | Eliminated (week 2) | | | | |
| TropeirÁfrica | —N/a | Bottom four | Eliminated (week 1) | | | | | |
| Prih Queiroz | —N/a | Bottom four | Eliminated (week 1) | | | | | |
| Ariane Villa Lobos | —N/a | Bottom four | Eliminated (week 1) | | | | | |
| Tamires Alves | Bottom four | Eliminated (week 1) | | | | | | |
| O Clã | Bottom four | Eliminated (week 1) | | | | | | |
| Eli | Bottom four | Eliminated (week 1) | | | | | | |
| Final showdown | Eli | TropeirÁfrica | Diego | Heloá | Heloá | Conrado | No final showdown or judges' votes: results were based on public votes alone | |
| Final showdown | Tamires | Diego | Diego | Heloá | Heloá | Conrado | No final showdown or judges' votes: results were based on public votes alone | |
| Final showdown | Naomi | Prih | Valter Jr. & Vinicius | Naomi | Jenni | Ravena | No final showdown or judges' votes: results were based on public votes alone | |
| Final showdown | O Clã | Ariane | Valter Jr. & Vinicius | Naomi | Jenni | Ravena | No final showdown or judges' votes: results were based on public votes alone | |
| Judges voted to | Save | | Eliminate | | | | No final showdown or judges' votes: results were based on public votes alone | |
| Miklos' vote | Ravena | Valter Jr. & Vinicius | Diego | Naomi | Jenni | Conrado | No final showdown or judges' votes: results were based on public votes alone | |
| Ferrero's vote | Conrado | Miguel | Valter Jr. & Vinícius | Naomi | Heloá | Ravena | No final showdown or judges' votes: results were based on public votes alone | |
| Rosa's vote | Heloá | Jenni | Valter Jr. & Vinícius | Naomi | Heloá | Conrado | No final showdown or judges' votes: results were based on public votes alone | |
| Bonadio's vote | Cristopher | Rafael | Diego | Heloá | Jenni | Conrado | No final showdown or judges' votes: results were based on public votes alone | |
| Eliminated | Eli; Public vote to save | Ariane Villa Lobos; Public vote to save | Rafael Oliveira; Public vote to save | Miguel EV; Public vote to save | Diego Martins; Public vote to save | Conrado Bragança; 3 of 4 votes Majority | Ravena; Public vote to win | Jenni Mosello; Public vote to win |
| Eliminated | O Clã; Public vote to save | Prih Queiroz; Public vote to save | Rafael Oliveira; Public vote to save | Miguel EV; Public vote to save | Diego Martins; Public vote to save | Conrado Bragança; 3 of 4 votes Majority | Ravena; Public vote to win | Jenni Mosello; Public vote to win |
| Eliminated | O Clã; Public vote to save | Prih Queiroz; Public vote to save | Valter Jr. & Vinicius; 2 of 4 votes Deadlock | Naomi Dominguez; 3 of 4 votes Majority | Heloá Holanda; 2 of 4 votes Deadlock | Conrado Bragança; 3 of 4 votes Majority | Ravena; Public vote to win | Jenni Mosello; Public vote to win |
| Eliminated | Tamires Alves; Public vote to save | TropeirÁfrica; Public vote to save | Valter Jr. & Vinicius; 2 of 4 votes Deadlock | Naomi Dominguez; 3 of 4 votes Majority | Heloá Holanda; 2 of 4 votes Deadlock | Conrado Bragança; 3 of 4 votes Majority | Ravena; Public vote to win | Jenni Mosello; Public vote to win |

=== Live show details ===
==== Week 1 ====
October 24

- Theme: Judges' choice
- Group performance: "Can't Stop the Feeling!"

Contestants performances in the top 16 live show (Monday)
| Act | Order | Song | Result |
|---|---|---|---|
| Eli | 1 | "Locked Out of Heaven" | Bottom four |
| Tamires Alves | 2 | "A Lua Que Eu Te Dei" | Bottom four |
| Ravena | 3 | "Survivor" | Safe |
| Heloá Holanda | 4 | "Love On Top" | Safe |
| Conrado Bragança | 5 | "Iris" | Safe |
| Cristopher Clark | 6 | "I Don't Want to Miss a Thing" | Safe |
| Naomi Dominguez | 7 | "Na Sua Estante" | Bottom four |
| O Clã | 8 | "País do Futebol" | Bottom four |
Final showdown details
| Eli | 1 | "Mandou Bem" | Eliminated |
| Tamires Alves | 2 | "Sweet Dreams" | Eliminated |
| Naomi Dominguez | 3 | "Equalize" | Safe |
| O Clã | 4 | "Amor de Chocolate" | Eliminated |

- Each mentor selected one finalist from their own category to advance. The bottom four acts performed another song of their choice in a final showdown and the public was required to save one of them based on the performance.

October 26

- Theme: Judges' choice

Contestants performances in the top 16 live show (Wednesday)
| Act | Order | Song | Result |
|---|---|---|---|
| Valter Jr. & Vinicius | 1 | "Infiel" | Safe |
| Prih Queiroz | 2 | "Overjoyed" | Bottom four |
| Miguel EV | 3 | "Crazy" | Safe |
| Ariane Villa Lobos | 4 | "Firework" | Bottom four |
| TropeirÁfrica | 5 | "Segura o Corpo" | Bottom four |
| Diego Martins | 6 | "Want to Want Me" | Bottom four |
| Rafael Oliveira | 7 | "Stay" | Safe |
| Jenni Mosello | 8 | "Mercy" | Safe |
Final showdown details
| TropeirÁfrica | 1 | "Abana o Vestido" | Eliminated |
| Diego Martins | 2 | "Chandelier" | Safe |
| Prih Queiroz | 3 | "Que Sorte a Nossa" | Eliminated |
| Ariane Villa Lobos | 4 | "Feeling Good" | Eliminated |

- Each mentor selected one finalist from their own category to advance. The bottom four acts performed another song of their choice in a final showdown and the public was required to save one of them based on the performance.

==== Week 2 ====
October 31

- Theme: Halloween
- Group performance: "Sympathy for the Devil"
- Musical guest: Paula Fernandes ("Pra Você" / "Olhos do Céu") and NX Zero ("Modo Avião")

Contestants performances in the top 10 live show
| Act | Order | Song | Result |
|---|---|---|---|
| Diego Martins | 1 | "Monster" | Bottom three |
| Valter Jr. & Vinicius | 2 | "Menina Veneno" | Bottom three |
| Cristopher Clark | 3 | "Talking to the Moon" | Safe |
| Conrado Bragança | 4 | "Sem Radar" | Safe |
| Naomi Dominguez | 5 | "I'm in Love with a Monster" | Safe |
| Ravena | 6 | "E.T." | Safe |
| Rafael Oliveira | 7 | "Superstition" | Eliminated |
| Jenni Mosello | 8 | "Máscara" | Safe |
| Miguel EV | 9 | "Demons" | Safe |
| Heloá Holanda | 10 | "Sweet Dreams" ft. "É o Poder" | Safe |
Final showdown details
| Diego Martins | 1 | "Erva Venenosa" | Safe |
| Valter Jr. & Vinicius | 2 | "Flor" | Eliminated |

Judges' votes to eliminate

- Miklos: Diego Martins – backed his own act, Valter Jr. & Vinicius
- Ferrero: Valter Jr. & Vinicius – backed his own act, Diego Martins
- Rosa: Valter Jr. & Vinicius – based on the final showdown performances
- Bonadio: Diego Martins – said that Valter Jr. & Vinicius had more potential

With the acts in the bottom two receiving two votes each, the result was deadlocked and reverted to the earlier public vote. Valter Jr. & Vinicius were eliminated as the act with the fewest public votes.

==== Week 3 ====
November 7

- Theme: Retro
- Group performance: "Whisky a Go Go"
- Musical guests:
  - Monday: Il Volo ("'O sole mio" (shown on TV) / "Nessun dorma" (online only)) – (pre-recorded on October 31)
  - Wednesday: Anitta ("Sim ou Não" / "Bang" / "Essa Mina É Louca") and Alinne Rosa ("País da Fantasia")

Contestants performances in the top 8 live show
| Act | Order | Song | Result |
|---|---|---|---|
| Cristopher Clark | 1 | "Somebody to Love" | Safe |
| Conrado Bragança | 2 | "Alma Gêmea" | Safe |
| Naomi Dominguez | 3 | "Like a Virgin" | Bottom three |
| Miguel EV | 4 | "Against All Odds" | Eliminated |
| Heloá Holanda | 5 | "O Tempo não Pára" | Bottom three |
| Jenni Mosello | 6 | "Mr. Jones" | Safe |
| Diego Martins | 7 | "...Baby One More Time" | Safe |
| Ravena | 8 | "Dancin' Days" | Safe |
Final showdown details
| Heloá Holanda | 1 | "Eu Amo Você" | Safe |
| Naomi Dominguez | 2 | "Nothing Else Matters" | Eliminated |

Judges' votes to eliminate

- Rosa: Naomi Dominguez – gave no reason
- Miklos: Naomi Dominguez – based on the final showdown performances
- Bonadio: Heloá Holanda – based on the final showdown performances
- Ferrero: Naomi Dominguez – gave no reason

==== Week 4 ====
November 14

- Theme: Movies & Greatest hits
- Group performance: "Lady Marmalade" / "Diamonds Are a Girl's Best Friend" / "Your Song"
- Musical guest: Karol Conka ("Tombei" / "Maracutaia" / "É o Poder") and Paulo Miklos ("Sangue Latino")

Contestants performances in the top 6 live show
| Act | Order | First song | Movie | Order | Second song | Result |
|---|---|---|---|---|---|---|
| Heloá Holanda | 1 | "I Will Survive" | Priscilla | 7 | "Não Vá Embora" | Bottom three |
| Conrado Bragança | 2 | "Será" | Somos tão Jovens | 8 | "It's My Life" | Safe |
| Ravena | 3 | "Já Sei Namorar" | De Pernas pro Ar | 9 | "Single Ladies" | Safe |
| Cristopher Clark | 4 | "Brasil" | Elite Squad 2 | 10 | "Bang Bang" | Safe |
| Diego Martins | 5 | "Metamorfose Ambulante" | City of God | 11 | "Get Lucky" | Eliminated |
| Jenni Mosello | 6 | "All About That Bass" | The Intern | 12 | "Beijinho no Ombro" | Bottom three |
Final showdown details
| Heloá Holanda | 1 | "Amei Te Ver" | | | | Eliminated |
| Jenni Mosello | 2 | "Love on the Brain" | | | | Safe |

Judges' votes to eliminate

- Bonadio: Jenni Mosello – based on the final showdown performances
- Ferrero: Heloá Holanda – based on the final showdown performances
- Miklos: Jenni Mosello – gave no reason
- Rosa: Heloá Holanda – would not eliminate either of her acts so chose to put it to public vote by equalising the votes

With the acts in the final showdown receiving two votes each, the result was deadlocked and reverted to the earlier public vote. Heloá Holanda was eliminated as the act with the fewest public votes.

==== Week 5: Final ====
November 21

- Theme: Judges' choice & Contestant's choice

Contestants performances in the top 4 live show
| Act | Order | First song | Order | Second song | Result |
|---|---|---|---|---|---|
| Cristopher Clark | 1 | "Dog Days Are Over" | 5 | "Só Rezo" | Safe |
| Jenni Mosello | 2 | "Me Espera" ft. "Little Lion Man" | 6 | "Bitch Better Have My Money" | Safe |
| Ravena | 3 | "Ai, Ai, Ai" | 7 | "That's My Girl" | Bottom two |
| Conrado Bragança | 4 | "What a Wonderful World" | 8 | "Coisa Linda" | Bottom two |
Final showdown details
| Conrado Bragança | 1 | "Heaven" | | | Eliminated |
| Ravena | 2 | "Girl on Fire" | | | Safe |

Judges' votes to eliminate

- Miklos: Conrado Bragança – backed his own act, Ravena
- Ferrero: Ravena – backed his own act, Conrado Bragança
- Bonadio: Conrado Bragança – gave no reason
- Rosa: Conrado Bragança – gave no reason

November 23

- Theme: Contestant's choice & Winner's song (billed as "song to win")
- Group performance: "Viva la Vida" (Top 10 finalists)
- Musical guests: Ludmilla ("Sou Eu" / "Bom"), Tiago Iorc ("Amei Te Ver"), Jota Quest ("Blecaute" / "Um Dia Pra Não Se Esquecer")

Contestants performances in the final live show
| Act | Order | First song | Order | Second song | Result |
|---|---|---|---|---|---|
| Jenni Mosello | 1 | "You Know I'm No Good" | 4 | "Oração" | Runner-up |
| Cristopher Clark | 2 | "Quando o Sol Bater Na Janela do Teu Quarto" | 5 | "Stone Cold" | Winner |
| Ravena | 3 | "Sim ou Não" | 6 | N/A (already eliminated) | Third place |

Following the announcement that Clark had won, he performed "Kiss".

== Ratings and reception ==
=== Brazilian ratings ===
All numbers are in points and provided by IBOPE.

| Episode | Title | Air Date | Timeslot (BRT) | Viewers (in points) | Rank Timeslot | Source |
|---|---|---|---|---|---|---|
| 0 | X Factor Preview | August 24, 2016 | Wednesday 1:00 a.m. | 5.5 | 1 | |
| 1 | Auditions 1 | August 29, 2016 | Monday 10:30 p.m. | 3.3 | 4 | |
| 2 | Auditions 2 | August 31, 2016 | Wednesday 10:30 p.m. | 2.6 | 4 | |
| 3 | Auditions 3 | September 5, 2016 | Monday 10:30 p.m. | 2.4 | 4 | |
| 4 | Auditions 4 | September 7, 2016 | Wednesday 10:30 p.m. | 2.3 | 4 | |
| 5 | Auditions 5 | September 12, 2016 | Monday 10:30 p.m. | 2.1 | 4 | |
| 6 | Auditions 6 | September 14, 2016 | Wednesday 10:30 p.m. | 2.8 | 4 | |
| 7 | Auditions 7 | September 19, 2016 | Monday 10:30 p.m. | 3.1 | 3 | |
| 8 | Auditions 8 | September 21, 2016 | Wednesday 10:30 p.m. | 2.6 | 4 | |
| 9 | Bootcamp 1 | September 26, 2016 | Monday 10:30 p.m. | 2.4 | 4 | |
| 10 | Bootcamp 2 | September 28, 2016 | Wednesday 10:30 p.m. | 2.5 | 4 | |
| 11 | Bootcamp 3 | October 3, 2016 | Monday 10:30 p.m. | 2.5 | 4 | |
| 12 | Bootcamp 4 | October 5, 2016 | Wednesday 10:30 p.m. | 2.2 | 4 | |
| 13 | Four-chair challenge 1 | October 10, 2016 | Monday 10:30 p.m. | 2.4 | 4 | |
| 14 | Four-chair challenge 2 | October 12, 2016 | Wednesday 10:30 p.m. | 2.3 | 4 | |
| 15 | Four-chair challenge 3 | October 17, 2016 | Monday 10:30 p.m. | 2.3 | 4 | |
| 16 | Four-chair challenge 4 | October 19, 2016 | Wednesday 10:30 p.m. | 2.6 | 4 | |
| 17 | Top 16 perform – part 1 | October 24, 2016 | Monday 10:30 p.m. | 2.6 | 4 | |
| 18 | Top 16 perform – part 2 | October 26, 2016 | Wednesday 10:30 p.m. | 2.7 | 4 | |
| 19 | Top 10 perform | October 31, 2016 | Monday 10:30 p.m. | 2.3 | 4 | |
| 20 | Top 10 results | November 2, 2016 | Wednesday 10:30 p.m. | 2.8 | 4 | |
| 21 | Top 8 perform | November 7, 2016 | Monday 10:30 p.m. | 2.1 | 4 | |
| 22 | Top 8 results | November 9, 2016 | Wednesday 10:30 p.m. | 1.7 | 4 | |
| 23 | Top 6 perform | November 14, 2016 | Monday 10:30 p.m. | 2.3 | 4 | |
| 24 | Top 6 results | November 16, 2016 | Wednesday 10:30 p.m. | 2.4 | 4 | |
| 25 | Top 4 perform | November 21, 2016 | Monday 10:30 p.m. | 2.3 | 4 | |
| 26 | Season Finale | November 23, 2016 | Wednesday 10:30 p.m. | 2.5 | 4 | |

- In 2016, each point represents 69.417 households in São Paulo.
