= Deixa Ele Sofrer =

Single by Anitta

from the album Bang!
- Language: Portuguese
- Released: July 16, 2015
- Recorded: 2014; U.M. Music Studios (Rio de Janeiro, Brazil)
- Genre: Pop; R&B
- Length: 2:51
- Label: Warner Music
- Songwriters: Larissa Machado; Umberto Tavares; Jefferson Junior
- Producer: Umberto Tavares

Anitta singles chronology
| "No Meu Talento" (2014) | "Deixa Ele Sofrer" (2015) | "Bang!" (2015) |

Music video
- "Deixa Ele Sofrer" on YouTube

"Deixa Ele Sofrer" (English: Let Him Suffer) is a song by Brazilian pop singer Anitta, released as the first single from her third studio album Bang! (2015). It was officially launched on the radio and digital vehicles on July 16, 2015.

== Composition ==
The song was written by Anitta together with its producers Umberto Tavares and Jefferson Junior. During an interview with Yuri Carvalho, the Audiograma portal, she said that the band praised the power of women, as currently in the twenty-first century there is more room for female submission in relation to the man, "I wanted to highlight the issue of self-esteem in the relationship between man and woman.We spoke of a boy who made little of a girl and, instead of falling, decided to let it go, which resulted in a turnaround that made him stand behind her.

For the newspaper O Sul the singer stated that the song did not encourage her to hurt people, but rather did not let herself be deceived: "I do not say in music for anyone to blame the other. The tip I give is: if you feel there is something wrong, face does not want to make a relationship, get out. You just embark on one situation if you are sure of what the other wants."

== Critical reception ==
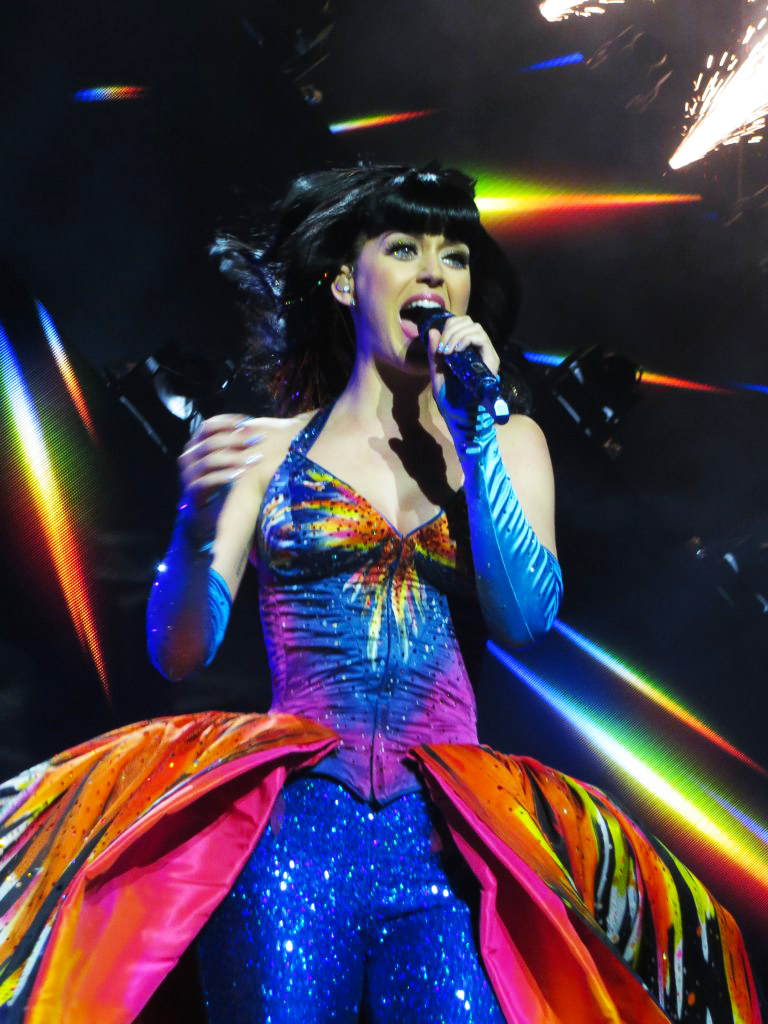
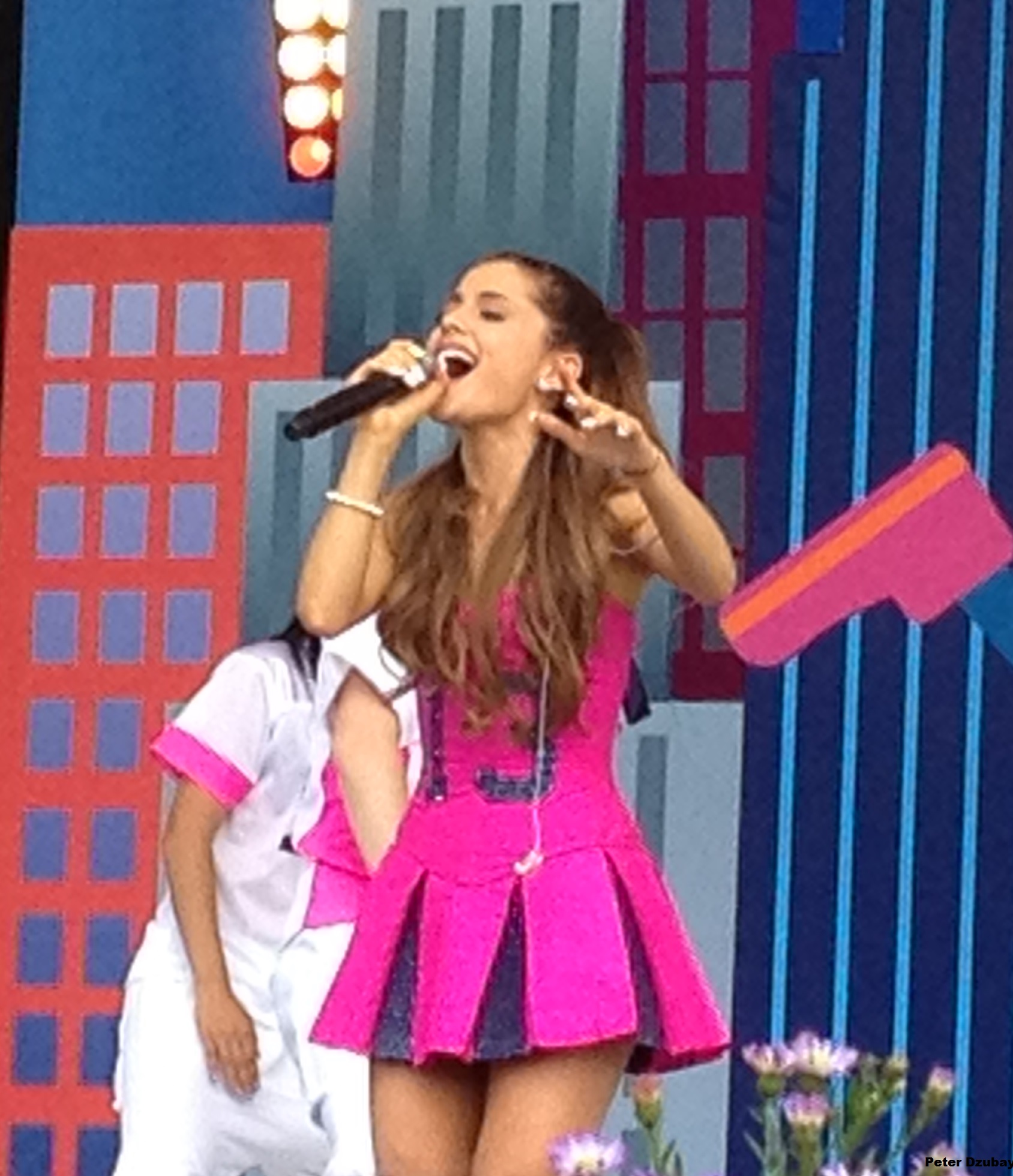
"Deixa Ele Sofrer" was compared to the songs of the American singers Katy Perry (left) and Ariana Grande (right).

William Tintel, the site It Pop, commented: "In the song the singer talks about leaving her ex-boyfriend crying, since it is he who regret for losing it, and its sound becomes increasingly pop, here flirting with one R&B half Tori Kelly, Ariana Grande, this time much more synchronized with what is playing outside, "adding:" Apart from the references gringos, the track earns points for its lyrics completely in Portuguese and, with this unpretentious footprint, it sounds like music track of some future Globo TV novel, which means that with a good publicity, as we know it will, will attract the attention necessary for his third album." The site also commented that the phrase ... for me it is not king ...Hey! of pop singer Jullie. The newspaper O Sul was positive and said that the band has strong references to "black American music." The Argentinean site NT Diario gave a positive critique to the song and called Anitta of "Princess of the Brazilian Pop". The well - known blogger Josep Vinaixa, the Spanish site Ultimate Music, posted on her, also calling her "Princess of Pop Brazilian" and saying that it's about time it release a single in English, comparing it to US singer Katy Perry. According to the critic, "Let It Suffer" has a hit and should become a radio anthem and another No. 1 in Anitta's career. "At the age of 22, she placed seven singles at the top of the Brazilian digital chart," he said.

== Commercial performance ==
"Deixa Ele Sofrer" debuted at forty-eight on the Brazil Billboard Hot 100 Airplay. The following week the song jumped thirty nine positions in the chart, to the ninth position. The single had its top to seventh position.

== Music video ==
=== Recording and production ===
The filming of the music video took place on June 24, 2015 in the neighborhoods of Perdizes and Vila Madalena, west of the capital of São Paulo; the recordings had the special participation of the actors André Bankoff and Bernardo Velasco, who has also performed several works as a model. The video script was signed by Anitta own, while the direction was taken over by the Colombian director Gustavo Camacho. The costumes for the video were signed by the designer Jeremy Scott of the international brand Moschino.

=== Synopsis ===
The video is a sequel, with Anitta starting it in a barber shop, where she offers a spellbound drink to her ex-boyfriend. From then on, she toured other parts of the city in retro settings, like a diner (which was used before in the music video Hair & Soul by Wanessa), arriving at a party at the end of it. The music video was inspired by the movie Birdman, from 2014.

=== Reception ===
In just 22 hours, the music video spent 1 million views on YouTube's official channel, making Anitta beat its own record as "Na Batida" and " Zen" reached 1 million hits 24 hours after its release. The portal Diva Depressão was positive and compared the video to those of "Pretty Girls" by Britney Spears and "Bitch I'm Madonna" by Madonna for the references of color and comic plot.

== Track listing ==
Download digital
| No. | Title | Length |
|---|---|---|
| 1. | "Deixa Ele Sofrer" | 2:51 |

Download digital
| No. | Title | Length |
|---|---|---|
| 1. | "Deixa Ele Sofrer" (Acustic) | 2:42 |

== Charts ==
=== Weekly charts ===
| Chart (2015) | Peak position |
|---|---|
| Brazil Billboard Brasil Hot 100 Airplay | 7 |
| Brazil Billboard Brasil Regional Grande São Paulo Hot Songs | 3 |
| Brazil Billboard Brasil Regional Rio de Janeiro Hot Songs | 3 |
| Brazil Billboard Brasil Regional Salvador Hot Songs | 1 |
| Brazil Billboard Brasil Regional Recife Hot Songs | 2 |
| Brazil Billboard Brasil Regional Florianópolis Hot Songs | 5 |

=== Year-end charts ===
| Chart (2015) | Peak position |
|---|---|
| Brazil (Brasil Hot 100 Airplay) | 52 |

== Awards and nominations ==
| Year | Award | Category | Result | Ref |
|---|---|---|---|---|
| 2015 | Multishow Brazilian Music Award | New Hit | Nominated | |
| 2015 | Capricho Awards | Best National Hit | Nominated | |
| 2015 | Capricho Awards | Melhor Clipe Nacional | Won | |
| 2015 | Caldeirão de Ouro | The 10+ of the Year | 4th place | |
