= Essa Mina é Louca =

Single by Anitta featuring Jhama

from the album Bang!
- Language: Portuguese
- English title: "This Girl Is Crazy"
- Released: January 14, 2016
- Recorded: 2015
- Studio: U.M. Music, Rio de Janeiro, Brazil
- Genre: Samba; reggae; pop rock; hip hop
- Length: 2:40
- Label: Warner Music
- Songwriter(s): Ohana; Pablo Luís Bispo
- Producer(s): Rafael Castilhol

Anitta singles chronology
"Blecaute" (2015)	"Essa Mina é Louca" (2016)	"Ginza (Remix)" (2016)

Jhama singles chronology
"Casa Nova" (2015)	"Essa Mina é Louca" (2016)	"PiJhama" (2017)

"Essa Mina é Louca" is a song by Brazilian artist Anitta. It is from her third studio album, Bang! (2015). The vocals were recorded at Studio Fibra, Rio de Janeiro.

The song is featured on the soundtrack of Brazilian telenovela Pega Pega, produced by TV Globo, as the theme associated with the character played by Nanda Costa.

== Music video ==
The music video was directed by Bruno Ilogti with creative direction from Giovanni Bianc, and a performance from actress Isis Valverde. The aesthetics are different from her previous videos - less sensual and more sweet and colorful. The costumes designed by stylist Daniel Ueda are colorful and full of plastic pieces, inspired by Japanese Manga. "This time it was all created especially for the clip, because they are the clothes that people would not wear in real life," added Anitta.

The setting of the music video is like a doll house, and the video makes direct references to the singer's previous song, "Bang". On the aesthetics of the video, the singer said that "no one expected us to bring the aesthetics of "Bang". "'Bang' was black and white while this one is very colorful, so it gives a contrast."

In the video, Anitta and the rapper Jhama are a couple, but the entrance of the character of Isis Valverde changes the course of the story and ends with a kiss between the two. "We wanted to do it with a sense of humor and fun and that's the idea of all the clips." "It's so natural, it's a joke, a little thing that Hebe [Camargo] gives."

== Charts ==
Chart (2016)	Peak position
Brazil (Billboard Brasil Hot 100 Airplay)	14

Chart (2017)	Peak position
Brazil (Billboard Brasil Hot 100 Airplay)	63
