= X Factor (Brazilian TV series) =

- Genre: Reality television Dance; Talent show
- Created by: ITV (TV network); Simon Cowell
- Presented by: Fernanda Paes Leme
- Judges: Alinne Rosa; Rick Bonadio; Paulo Miklos; Di Ferrero
- Country of origin: Brazil
- Original language: Portuguese
- No. of seasons: 1
- No. of episodes: 26

Production
- Running time: 120 minutes
- Production companies: Syco Entertainment; Thames

Original release
- Network: Band; TNT
- Release: August 29 – November 23, 2016

Related
- The X Factor (franchise)

X Factor was a Brazilian reality television music competition show created by Simon Cowell and produced by FremantleMedia and Syco Entertainment, which airs on Band, with reruns airing the following day on TNT. The series premiered on August 29, 2016.

A second season was announced on 2017, but was canceled on the same year. As of January 2024, it is unknown if a second season will be reconsidered.

== Production ==
Based on the original UK show, and an addition to The X Factor franchise, the series found new singing talent (solo artists and groups ages 16 and over), drawn from public auditions, and they competed against each other for votes.

The winner was determined by the show's viewers via telephone, the Internet, and SMS text voting, and was awarded a recording contract with Sony Music Brasil.

The original judging panel consisted of Rick Bonadio, Alinne Rosa, Di Ferrero and Paulo Miklos, with Fernanda Paes Leme as main host and Mauricio Meirelles as social media correspondent.

In November 2016, it was confirmed that the programme would be returning for a second season, airing in 2017. However, it was later cancelled in July 2017.

== Format ==
=== Categories ===
The show is primarily concerned with identifying singing talent, though appearance, personality, stage presence and dance routines are also an important element of many performances. Each judge is assigned one of four categories: "Boys" (aged 16–24 males), "Girls" (aged 16–24 females), "Over 25s" (solo acts aged 25 and over), and "Groups" (including duos). Through the live shows, the judges act as mentors to their category, helping to decide song choices, styling and staging, while judging contestants from other categories.

=== Stages ===
There are five stages to the competition:

- Stage 1: Producers' auditions (these auditions decide who will sing in front of the judges)
- Stage 2: Judges' auditions
- Stage 3: Boot camp
- Stage 4: Four-chair challenge
- Stage 5: Live shows (finals)

== Series overview ==
Contestant in (or mentor of) "Boys" category
Contestant in (or mentor of) "Girls" category
Contestant in (or mentor of) "Over 25s" category
Contestant in (or mentor of) "Groups" category

| Season | Start | Finish | Winner | Runner-up | Third place | Winning mentor | Host | Judges |
|---|---|---|---|---|---|---|---|---|
| 1 | August 29, 2016 | November 23, 2016 | Cristopher Clark | Jenni Mosello | Ravena | Rick Bonadio | Fernanda Paes Leme | Paulo Miklos; Di Ferrero; Alinne Rosa; Rick Bonadio |

== Judges and hosts ==
=== Judges ===
Judges gallery

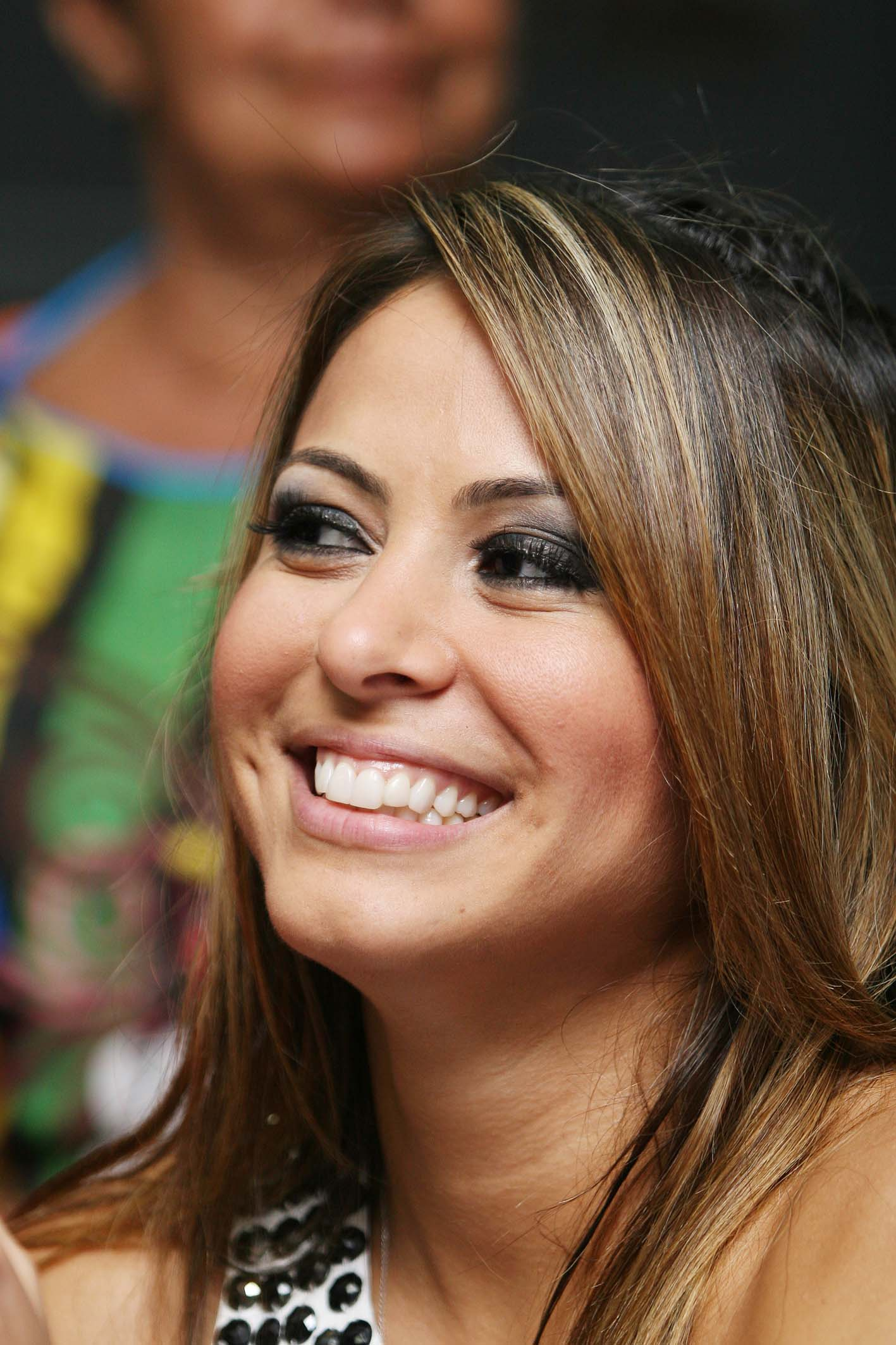
Alinne Rosa (2016)

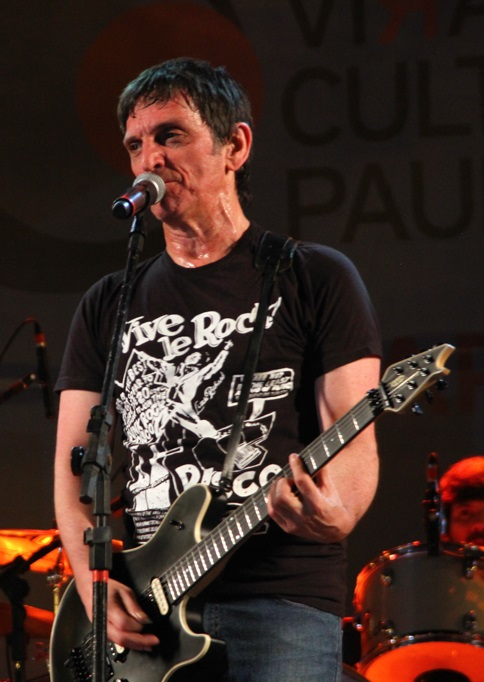
Paulo Miklos (2016)

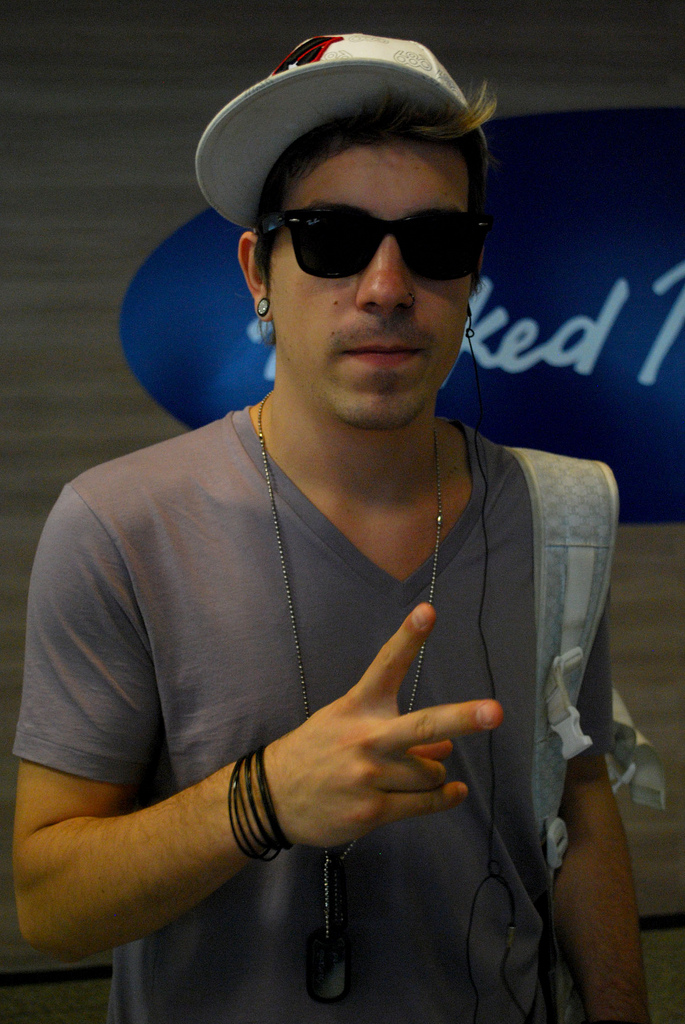
Di Ferrero (2016)

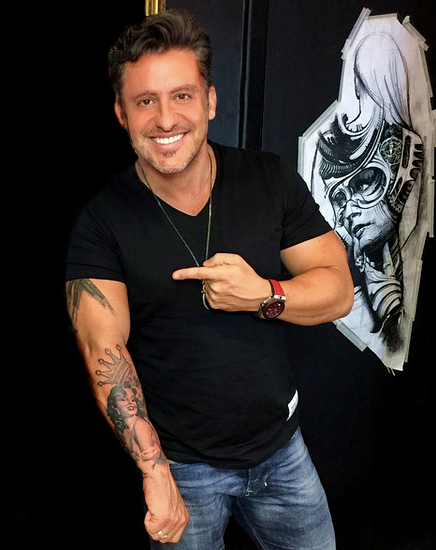
Rick Bonadio (2016)

=== Hosts ===
Hosts gallery

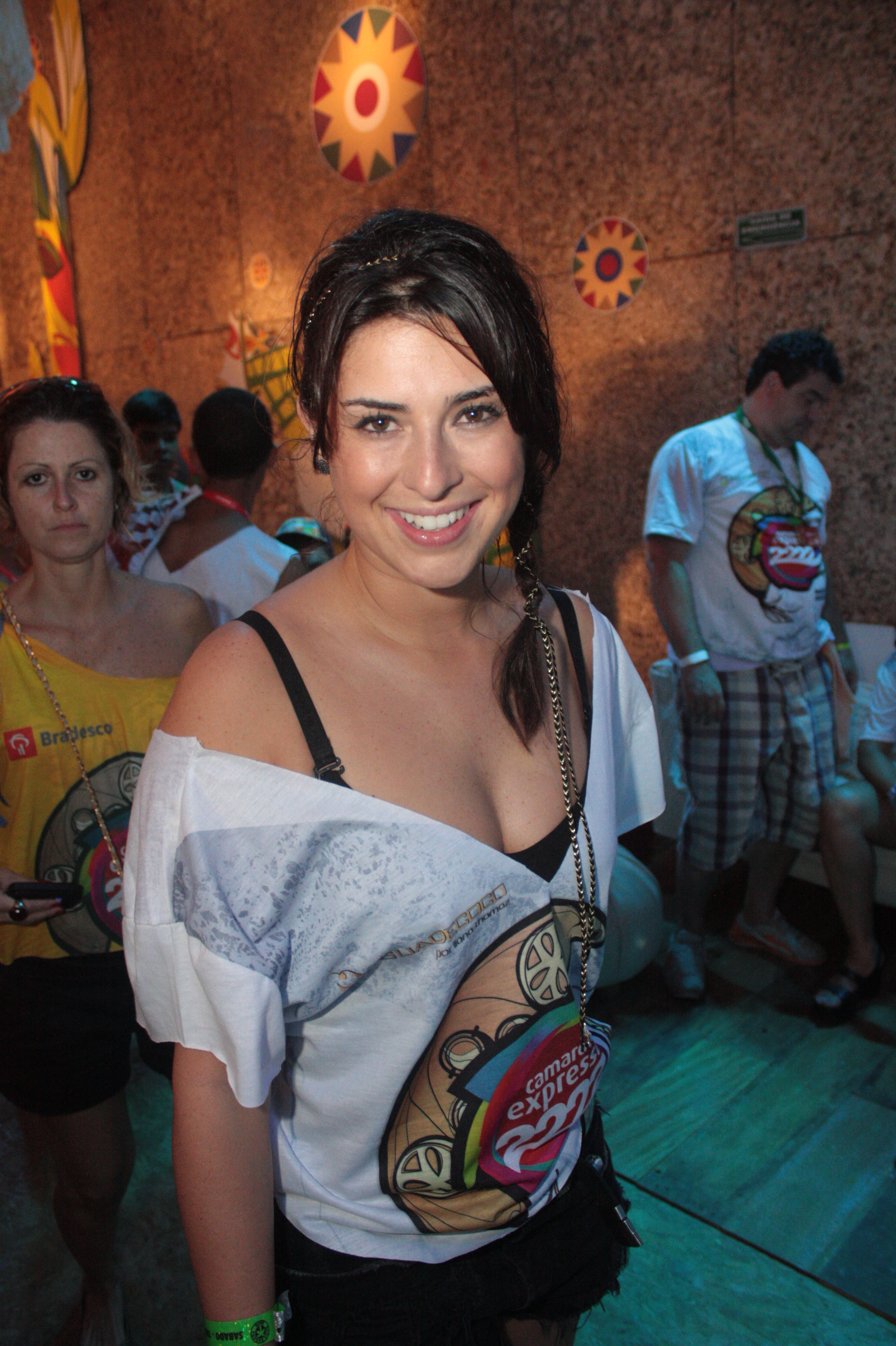
Fernanda Paes Leme (2016)

=== Judges' categories and their contestants ===
Each judge is allocated a category to mentor and chooses four acts to progress to the live finals. This table shows, for each season, which category each judge was allocated and which acts he or she put through to the live finals.

– Winning judge/category. Winners are in bold, eliminated contestants in small font.

| Season | Rick Bonadio | Alinne Rosa | Di Ferrero | Paulo Miklos |
|---|---|---|---|---|
| 1 | **Over 25s** **Cristopher Clark**; Rafael Oliveira; Prih Queiroz; Tamires Alves | **Girls**; Jenni Mosello; Heloá Holanda; Naomi Dominguez; Ariane Villa Lobos | **Boys**; Conrado Bragança; Diego Martins; Miguel EV; Eli | **Groups**; Ravena; Valter Jr. & Vinícius; TropeirÁfrica; O Clã |

== Ratings ==
| Season | Premiered | | Ended | | Timeslot (BRT) | TV season | Season viewers |
| Season | Date | Viewers (in points) | Date | Viewers (in points) | Timeslot (BRT) | TV season | Season viewers |
|---|---|---|---|---|---|---|---|
| 1 | August 29, 2016 | 3.3 | November 23, 2016 | 2.5 | Monday 10:30 pm (performance show) | 2016–17 | 2.5 |
| 1 | August 29, 2016 | 3.3 | November 23, 2016 | 2.5 | Wednesday 10:30 pm (results show) | 2016–17 | 2.5 |

- Each point represents a specific number of households in São Paulo.
2016: 69.000 households
