= List of awards and nominations received by Lexa =

Lexa awards and nominations
Awards and nominations
Award	Wins	Nominations
Meus Prêmios Nick	0	1
Prêmio Jovem Brasileiro	1	1
Geração Z Awards	0	4
Radio Music Awards Brasil	1	2
Capricho Awards	0	1
Brasil Music Awards	1	0

Totals (Note: Certain award groups do not simply award one winner. They acknowledge several different recipients, have runners-up, and have third place. Since this is a specific recognition and is different from losing an award, runner-up mentions are considered wins in this award tally. For simplification and to avoid errors, each award in this list has been presumed to have had a prior nomination.)
- Wins: 6
- Nominations: 9

Lexa is a Brazilian singer and actress. Her debut album Disponível was released on September 18, 2015.

== Meus Prêmios Nick ==
Year	Category	Nominated work	Result	Ref.
2015	Revelation Musical	"Lexa"	Nominated	

== Prêmio Jovem Brasileiro ==
Year	Category	Nominated work	Result	Ref.
2015	Singer Revelation	"Lexa"	Won	

== Brazilian Choice Awards ==
Year	Category	Nominated work	Result	Ref.
2015	Revelation Musical	"Lexa"	Won	
2015	Best Video	"Posso Ser"	Nominated	

== Geração Z Awards ==
Year	Category	Nominated work	Result	Ref.
2015	National Music	"Posso Ser"	Nominated	
2015	Video National	"Posso Ser"	Nominated	
2015	National Singer	"Lexa"	Nominated	
2015	National Revelation	"Lexa"	Nominated	

== Radio Music Awards Brasil ==
Year	Category	Nominated work	Result	Ref.
2015	Revelation	"Lexa"	Won	
2015	Best Emotional Music	"Pior Que Sinto Falta"	Nominated	
2015	Best Choreography	"Para de Marra"	Nominated	

== Capricho Awards ==
Year	Category	Nominated work	Result	Ref.
2015	National Revelation	"Lexa"	Nominated	

== Brasil Music Awards ==
Year	Category	Nominated work	Result	Ref.
2016	Artist Revelation	"Lexa"	Won	
