= Mallupy Entertainment =

Brazilian entertainment company

Mallupy Entertainment Inc.
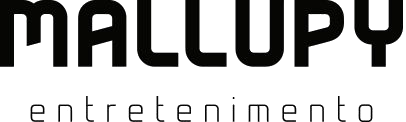
- Native name: Mallupy Entretenimento
- Company type: Public
- Traded as: KRX: 122870
- Industry: Entertainment; Retail
- Genre: R&B; Electronic; Dance; Pop
- Founded: February 24, 2003
- Area served: Worldwide
- Key people: Junior Costa (major shareholder)
- Products: Music
- Services: Entertainment
- Website: www.mallupy.com.br

Mallupy Entertainment is a Brazilian entertainment company founded in 2003 in Florianópolis, Brazil.

== History ==
Mallupy Entertainment has operated in the communications and entertainment industry since 2003. Its business operations include event production, artist promotion, radio station support, and brand repositioning. The company manages over 180 operations annually, primarily within southern Brazil, reaching an estimated audience of one million people.

=== Recording artists ===
Groups

- Raça Negra (inactive)
- Sorriso Maroto

Duos

- Jorge & Mateus
- Guilerme & Santiago
- Victor & Leo
- Matheus & Kaua

Soloists

- Alexandre Pires
- Belo
- Wesley Safadão
- Thiaguinho
- Lexa
- MC Guimê
