= Meu Lugar =

Album by Anitta

Live album and video by Anitta
- Released: June 3, 2014
- Recorded: February 15, 2014
- Venues: HSBC Arena, (Rio de Janeiro, Brazil)
- Genres: Pop; R&B; electropop
- Length: 142:19 (album); 107:00 (video)
- Language: Portuguese
- Label: Warner Music Group
- Director: Raoni Carneiro

Anitta chronology
Ritmo Perfeito (2014)	Meu Lugar (2014)	Bang! (2015)

Singles from Meu Lugar
- 1. "Blá Blá Blá" Released: March 23, 2014

Meu Lugar (transl. My Place) is the first live album by Brazilian singer and songwriter Anitta. Officially released on CD and DVD by Warner Music on June 3, 2014.

One day prior to the CD and DVD release, the album was made available in digital format, alongside Anitta's second studio album Ritmo Perfeito, which contains studio versions of the then unreleased songs, "Na Batida", "Ritmo Perfeito", "Música de Amor", "Cobertor", "Mulher", "No Meu Talento", "Blá Blá Blá", "Quem Sabe" e "Vai e Volta", performed on the live presentation.

In Brazil, the DVD was certified platinum for shipment of over 75,000 copies.

== Concept ==
The show plays with duality, through the concept "Heaven and Hell". In this way, the presentation begins set in hell and will advance to the sky. This trajectory will be marked by the use of colors, since in the first part, colors like gray and purple will prevail, as you walk towards the sky, you will become white and pink. Concept already done by the singer Wanessa in its album DNA Tour released in 2013.

To tell the story, Anitta and the directors used the Greek mythology of the Pandora's Box and the Cirque du Soleil shows, which always exploit playful, visually appealing and entertaining themes. The show features a character who will be the narrator of this adventure lived by Carlos Marcio Moreira, a Cirque du Soleil dancer who gives life to the three characters: death gravedigger, a filmmaker, and an angel who opens the door to heaven.

The scene that characterizes the hell brings influences of the sourly universe of the medieval epochs and irreverence and "strong inks" of a reference the style of filmmaker Tim Burton, with the use of colors and exaggerated figures that resemble the work of the filmmaker. Modern graphic features are also present, such as mapped projection, LED panels next to these old references, giving the show an almost theatrical tone.

== Track listing ==
Meu Lugar – iTunes exclusive deluxe edition
No.	Title	Writer(s)	Length
1.	"Porta do Centro da Terra" (Intro)	Mãozinha; R Araújo; Raoni Carneiro	2:51
2.	"Não Para"	Anitta	3:14
3.	"Menina Má"	Anitta	3:06
4.	"Proposta"	Batutinha	2:54
5.	"Cachorro Eu Tenho Em Casa"	Anitta; Umberto Tavares; Jefferson Junior	2:32
6.	"Eu Sou Assim"	Anitta; U. Tavares; J. Junior	5:24
7.	"Fica Só Olhando"	Batutinha	4:03
8.	"Ritmo Perfeito"	Anitta; U. Tavares; J. Junior	2:54
9.	"Achei / Príncipe de Vento"	Anitta / Anitta; U. Tavares; J. Junior	4:17
10.	"Zen"	Anitta; U. Tavares; J. Junior	2:44
11.	"Quem Sabe"	Le Tícia	3:43
12.	"Musica de Amor"	Anitta; U. Tavares; J. Junior	3:06
13.	"Cobertor" (feat. Projota)	Projota; Danilo Valbusa; Pedro Caropreso; Diego Silveira	3:06
14.	"Mulher" (feat. Projota)	Projota; Mayk	3:02
15.	"Eu Vou Ficar" (Remix) (feat. PH)	Batutinha	2:31
16.	"Tá na Mira"	Anitta	3:06
17.	"Meiga e Abusada"	Anitta; U. Tavares; J. Junior	3:47
18.	"Na Batida"	Anitta; U. Tavares; J. Junior	2:41
19.	"Movimento da Sanfoninha"	DJ Pimpa; Rafael Castilhol	2:56
20.	"No Meu Talento"	Anitta; U. Tavares; J. Junior	2:44
21.	"Blá Blá Blá"	Anitta; U. Tavares; J. Junior	2:52
22.	"Show das Poderosas"	Anitta	4:19
23.	"Vai e Volta" (studio)	Anitta	2:52
24.	"Na Batida" (studio)	Anitta; U. Tavares; J. Junior	2:43
25.	"Música de Amor" (studio)	Anitta; U. Tavares; J. Junior	3:05
26.	"Cobertor" (studio) (feat. Projota)	Tiago Pereira; D. Valbusa; P. Caropreso; D. Silveira	3:04
27.	"Mulher" (studio) (feat. Projota)	Projota; Mayk	2:45
28.	"Blá Blá Blá" (studio)	Anitta; U. Tavares; J. Junior	2:53
29.	"Quem Sabe" (studio)	Le Tícia	3:43
30.	"No Meu Talento" (studio)	Anitta; U. Tavares; J. Junior	2:44
31.	"Ritmo Perfeito" (studio)	Anitta; U. Tavares; J. Junior	2:56
32.	"Blá Blá Blá" (Extended Remix) (studio)	Anitta; U. Tavares; J. Junior	3:25
Total length:			142:19

== Charts ==
=== Year-end charts ===
Chart (2014)	Peak position
Brazilian Albums (ABPD)	2
