= Bang! (Anitta album) =

Studio album by Anitta
- Released: 13 October 2015
- Recorded: 2014–2015
- Studio: U.M. Music Studios (Rio de Janeiro, Brazil); Studios Fibra (Rio de Janeiro, Brazil)
- Genre: Pop; R&B
- Length: 42:35
- Language: Portuguese
- Label: Warner Brasil
- Producer: Mãozinha; Rafael Castilhol; Jeff; Toninho Aguiar; Kalfani; Umberto Tavares; Papatinho; Pedro Dash

Anitta chronology
Ritmo Perfeito (2014)	Bang! (2015)	Kisses (2019)

Singles from Bang!
- 1. "Deixa Ele Sofrer" Released: July 16, 2015; 2. "Bang" Released: October 9, 2015; 3. "Essa Mina é Louca" Released: January 14, 2016; 4. "Cravo e Canela" Released: May 5, 2016

Bang! is the third studio album by Brazilian singer Anitta, released on October 13, 2015, by Warner Music Brasil. The album contains 14 new songs plus an acoustic version of the single "Deixa Ele Sofrer".

Primarily a pop album, Bang explores R&B, reggae, samba and funk carioca music. The album features guest appearances by Nego do Borel, Vitin, Jhama, Dubeat, MC Duduzinho and rap group ConeCrewDiretoria. Production for the album took place during 2014 to 2015 at several recording studios and was handled by Anitta, Jefferson "Mãozinha" Junior and Umberto Tavares. The album was certified gold in sales only in the pre-order with over 40,000 copies.

== Background ==
Soon after the release of the latest single from the album Ritmo Perfeito, "No Meu Talento", Anitta confirmed she was working on new songs for the follow-up. The styles of the songs were kept secret until "Deixa Ele Sofrer", the first single off the album, because official sneak peeks weren't available. Excerpts of some songs as "Me Leva a Sério" had leaked onto the Internet in mid-June. In September, the singer talked about her new album: "I am very focused on my album, a new Anitta is coming and I'll change my outfits", also commenting on her dream of having an international career and the possibility of realizing it in the following year.

== Cover art ==
The cover of the album was made by Brazilian artist Giovanni Bianco. The image shows the singer in a black and white photo, but with colorful details, her tongue out and a pair of sunglasses with her name written on it. According to Bianco, the singer gave her a very precious briefing: "I want and I need to appeal to the kids and the adults. My fans are all ages. I want something fun, happy, pop," and that was his total inspiration. According to Anitta, it was the first time she had the courage to leave the whole process under the responsibility of another person. "I asked him to make an art that showed strength. He did it with Bang, but it was supposed to be temporary. I enjoyed it so much that I decided to compose a song with that title," she said. For Gabriel Justo, from Capricho magazine, the cover art reminds of the single "Bang Bang" (2014), by singers Jessie J, Ariana Grande and Nicki Minaj, and the detail of the name "Anitta" written in the glasses reminded of the album cover for Unapologetic (2012), by singer Rihanna. A few hours after the release of the cover, it became a meme between fans and celebrities, who posted photos on social media imitating the pose of the singer on the cover.

== Release and promotion ==
Anitta released excerpts of lyrics from the album through the site "descubrabang.com" in random order and without the songs' titles. On October 9, 2015, four days before the official release, the album was made available for download on a Chinese site. The original link was soon taken down, but, due to the rapid spread the album was hosted on dozens of other sites to download.

== Critical reception ==
Professional ratings
Review scores
Source	Rating
Veja	Positive
Notas Musicais	3/5 stars
G1	Positive
Aratu Online	4/5 stars
Pop de Botequim	Positive
Território da Música	3/5 stars

Bang received positive reviews from music critics. Luís Lima, of Veja magazine, said in a report that "Bang is sonorously more daring and experimental than the previous two - Anitta (2013) and Ritmo Perfeito (2014). But the three have one feature in common: most of the lyrics address themes related to female love and empowerment." Rodrigo Ortega and Braulio Lorentz of the G1 portal said that "overall, Bang looks precisely at pop, although it misses the target so often. When it hits, it's there to kill." Mauro Ferreira, from Notas Musicais, said Bang is Anitta's best album and was superior to her two previously released albums. He classified the title track together with the songs "Gosto Assim", "Deixa a Onda Te Levar" and "Me Leva a Serio" as the best of the album, and reviewed negatively "Parei" and "Pode Chegar". He also finished: "Bang! is a pre-conceived album in a marketing room. Its revenue includes calculated doses of this strategic marketing that has positioned Anitta as the most commercially powerful singer in Brazil today."

Marcelo Rodrigues of the Supertenimento website said: "Whoever believed that she would be just one of those momentary successes, was totally wrong because she has just released her newest work. Bang shows a maturation of the singer in comparison to her first two albums, the tracks are well worked, the catchy songs were losing space and the addition of new instruments can bring a new air to the scenario where Anitta is inserted." He even completed saying that the romantic "Cravo e Canela" and "Me Leva a Serio", can be the most beautiful tracks on the album, but he rejected "Pode Chegar" featuring Nego do Borel, calling it "the weakest." For Gabriel Vaquer of Arautu Online newspaper, the album shows that Anitta has matured as an artist and as a performer. He finalized by saying that the singer "is by far the most creative popular artist today," and "definitely became the main name of current Brazilian pop music." Tate Montenegro of the Territory of Music gave the album 3 stars, saying that Bang is a step that can lead Anitta to reach new horizons. Silvestre Mendes of Botequim's Pop website said, "Unlike previous studio projects, Bang had a more surgical finish. Each track has its identity, not to be confused with the songs heard previously, and that's a very positive balance." He highlighted the track "Cravo e Canela" by calling it a "love hit", "Essa Mina é Louca", classifying it as "very funny" and "Gosto Assim" as a "massive hit." She added that "[Bang] is the confirmation that Anitta did not come to be a one-hit wonder, but to have several hits in a row." The new album opens up pretty good doors for the style the singer has been embracing.

== Singles ==
Four singles were released from the album. "Deixa Ele Sofrer", released on July 16, 2015, as digital download. The track reached the top ten on the Billboard Brasil Hot 100, peaking at number seven. The title track of the album, "Bang" was released on October 9, 2015.

== Commercial performance ==
In her native Brazil, Bang debuted at number three on the ABPD Top 20 chart, selling 40,000 copies in its first week. As of May 2016, the album had sold over 300,000 copies with streaming in Brazil.

== Track listing ==
Bang – Brazilian standard version
No.	Title	Writer(s)	Length
1.	"Bang"	Anitta; Umberto Tavares; Jefferson Junior	3:11
2.	"Deixa Ele Sofrer"	Anitta; Tavares; Junior	2:51
3.	"Cravo e Canela" (featuring Vitin)	Jhama; Pablo Bispo	3:20
4.	"Parei"	Anitta; Tavares; Junior	2:33
5.	"Essa Mina é Louca" (featuring Jhama)	Jhama; Pablo Bispo	2:40
6.	"Atenção"	Anitta; Tavares; Junior	2:56
7.	"Gosto Assim" (featuring Dubeat)	Anitta; Dubeat; Kalfani Minkah	3:18
8.	"Show Completo"	Tavares; Junior	2:37
9.	"Volta Amor"	Anitta; André Vieira; Wallace Vianna	2:34
10.	"Sim" (featuring ConeCrewDiretoria)	Anitta; Ari; Batoré; Jhama; MC Cert; MC Maomé; Papatinho; Rany Money	3:06
11.	"Pode Chegar" (featuring Nego do Borel)	Tavares; Junior	3:06
12.	"Eu Sou do Tipo"	Anitta; André Vieira; Wallace Viana	2:18
13.	"Deixa a Onda Te Levar"	Anitta; Tavares; Junior	2:25
14.	"Me Leva a Sério"	José Tiago "Projota" Pereira	2:50
15.	"Deixa Ele Sofrer" (Acoustic)	Tavares; Junior	2:42

Bang – iTunes bonus track
No.	Title	Writer(s)	Length
16.	"Totalmente Demais" (featuring Duduzinho)	Arnaldo Brandão; Tavinho Paes; Roberio Rafael	2:43

== Charts ==
=== Weekly charts ===
Chart (2015)	Peak position
Brazilian Albums (ABPD)	3

=== Year-end charts ===
Chart (2015)	Peak position
Brazilian Albums (PMB)	16

== Certifications ==
Region	Certification	Certified units/sales
Brazil	—	300,000
