= Jenni Mosello =

Brazilian singer and songwriter (born 1994)

Background information
- Born: Jennifer Mosello; 1994 (age 31–32); Curitiba, Paraná, Brazil
- Genres: Pop music; indie pop; jazz
- Occupations: Singer, songwriter
- Years active: 2012–present

Jennifer Mosello (born 1994) is a Brazilian singer and songwriter. She became known as the runner-up on the talent show X Factor in 2016. In 2026, she was nominated for the Latin Grammy in the Songwriter of the Year and Best Contemporary Pop Album in Portuguese Language categories for her album BRava, in addition to having participated as a songwriter on Anitta's album Equilibrium, which was nominated for Album of the Year.

== Biography ==
Jenni Mosello was born in Curitiba, Paraná, in 1994. As a baby, she moved to Rome, Italy, where she remained until she was 10 years old. She grew up listening to jazz, blues, and soul. Back in Brazil, she also began listening to MPB and Bossa Nova.

At the age of 18, she became the lead singer of the band Open Jazz, which performed at famous music venues in Curitiba. Jenni went on to study psychology at the Pontifical Catholic University of Paraná, but soon took a leave of absence to devote herself exclusively to her singing career. In 2014, she took part in a tribute to Freddie Mercury titled Queen Symphonic as a vocalist, with the participation of Tiago Iorc and Ana Cañas. Her first original song, "I'm Not the One Who's Gonna Cry," was released in November of the same year.

In 2016, she became nationally known for taking part in the first season of the talent show X Factor Brasil, where she became the runner-up. In 2015, she had already released the EP Sketches, and in 2018 she released her first album, JENNI. After the release of JENNI, she began to focus a significant part of her professional work on songwriting for other artists, such as Luísa Sonza, Demi Lovato, Sam Smith, Cleo, Lexa, Carol Biazin, among others.

In 2023, she released her second studio album, FEMMINA, which presented an approach centered on themes such as femininity, identity, belonging, and autonomy. In 2025, she released the EP HOSTIL, which explored themes related to vulnerability, belonging, emotional health, and human relationships. In 2026, Mosello released her third studio album, BRava, conceived as a project aimed at investigating different expressions of Brazilian music from a contemporary perspective. BRava featured appearances by artists such as Ney Matogrosso, Xênia França, and Dani Black.

In the same year, she was part of the creative team responsible for Anitta's album EQUILIBRIVM.
