= Ritmo Perfeito =

Studio album by Anitta
- Released: 3 June 2014
- Recorded: 2014
- Studio: U.M. Music (Rio de Janeiro, Brazil)
- Genre: Pop; electropop; R&B
- Length: 30:55
- Language: Portuguese, Spanish
- Label: Warner Brasil
- Producer: Toninho Aguiar; Head Media; Rafael Castilhol; Danilo Sinna

Anitta chronology
Anitta (2013)	Ritmo Perfeito (2014)	Meu Lugar (2014)

Singles from Ritmo Perfeito
- 1. "Cobertor" Released: 24 May 2014; 2. "Na Batida" Released: 29 July 2014; 3. "Ritmo Perfeito" Released: 10 December 2014; 4. "No Meu Talento" Released: 26 February 2015

Ritmo Perfeito (English: Perfect Rhythm) is the second studio album by Brazilian pop singer Anitta. It was released by Warner Music Brasil on June 3, 2014, the same day as Anitta's first live album and DVD, Meu Lugar. Ritmo Perfeito features rappers MC Guime and Projota, who also wrote the songs "Cobertor" and "Mulher" (a revised version of his original song). The song's genre is the same as Anitta's first album (pop and electropop), but includes more prominent influences from funk melody and R&B.

== Composition ==
Anitta announced preparations for her first DVD in July 2013, which was later titled Meu Lugar. New songs were written especially for the project. Later, Anitta announced the release of two new albums in her YouTube video Blá Blá Blá with Anitta, a live album with audio extracted from the DVD Meu Lugar and a studio version of her new songs in addition to an original track.

Anitta collaborated with several new writers on this album, including Projota, who worked on the songs "Cobertor" and "Mulher." She collaborated with Umberto Tavares and Cornea Meternia on some tracks.

== Release ==
Ritmo Perfeito features two new singles that premiered on both radio and TV, as well as iTunes. The first single, "Cobertor," was accompanied by a music video on YouTube. A month later, the second single, "Na Batida," was released. The album reached gold record status by ABPD.

== Track listing ==
Ritmo Perfeito track listing
No.	Title	Writer(s)	Length
1.	"Na Batida"	Anitta; Umberto Tavares; Jefferson Junior	2:43
2.	"Ritmo Perfeito"	Anitta; Tavares; Junior	2:57
3.	"Música de Amor"	Anitta; Tavares; Junior	3:05
4.	"Cobertor" (featuring Projota)	Projota; Dan; Dash; DH	3:04
5.	"Mulher" (featuring Projota)	Projota; Mayk	2:45
6.	"No Meu Talento"	Anitta; Tavares; Junior	2:44
7.	"Blá Blá Blá"	Anitta; Tavares; Junior	2:53
8.	"Quem Sabe"	Le Tícia	3:43
9.	"Vai e Volta"	Anitta	2:52
10.	"Blá Blá Blá (Extended Remix)"	Anitta; Tavares; Junior	3:25
Total length:			30:55

Ritmo Perfeito - Reissue
No.	Title	Writer(s)	Length
11.	"Zen (Spanish Version)" (featuring Rasel)	Anitta; Rasel; Tavares; Junior	2:48
12.	"No Meu Talento (Remix)" (featuring Mc Guimê)	Anitta; Mc Guimê; Tavares; Junior	2:58
Total length:			36:01

== Charts ==
Chart (2014)	Peak position
Brazilian Albums (ABPD)	2
