= Diário da Lexa =

- Genre: Reality television
- Starring: Lexa
- Country of origin: Brazil
- Original language: Portuguese
- No. of seasons: 5
- No. of episodes: 16

Diário da Lexa is a Brazilian television documentary series of his career and the life of the singer Lexa, The series debuted on July 26, 2015, on the MTV network.

== Production ==
Lexa produced a series of videos on a YouTube channel titled Diario da Lexa. The series displays the singer's professional activities, including studio recordings, filming videos, and show rehearsals.

== Episodes ==
Season	Episodes	Originally aired	
Season	Episodes	First aired	Last aired
1	4	March 20, 2015	April 10, 2015
2	4	May 21, 2015	June 11, 2015
3	4	July 8, 2015	July 30, 2015
4	4	September 17, 2015	October 8, 2015
5	4	December 8, 2015	December 29, 2015
