= País do Futebol =

Single by MC Guimê featuring Emicida
- Released: November 3, 2013
- Recorded: 2013
- Genre: Brazilian funk, hip hop
- Length: 2:29
- Label: Maximo Produtora
- Songwriter(s): Leandro Oliveira, Guilherme Dantas

MC Guimê singles chronology
"Na Pista eu Arraso" (2013)	"País do Futebol" (2013)	"Brazil We Flexing" (2014)

Emicida singles chronology
"Hoje Cedo" (2013)	"País do Futebol" (2013)

"País do Futebol" is a single by Brazilian recording artist MC Guimê, featuring Brazilian rapper Emicida. It was used as the theme song of the telenovela Geração Brasil. The song's chorus mentions and pays tribute to football player Neymar, as well as the player appears in the music video.

== Music video ==
The music video was released on November 3, 2013 at the MC Guimê's channel in YouTube, and made available for digital download on iTunes on the same day.

== Charts ==
Chart (2013)	Peak position
Brazil Billboard Hot 100	21
