= Brazil We Flexing =

Single by MC Guimê featuring Soulja Boy
- Released: September 22, 2014
- Recorded: 2014
- Genre: Funk carioca; hip hop
- Length: 3:35
- Label: Maximo Produtora
- Songwriters: Fabulouz Fabs; Guilherme Dantas
- Producer: Fabulouz Fabs

MC Guimê singles chronology
"País do Futebol" (2013)	"Brazil We Flexing" (2014)	"Eu Vim Pra Ficar" (2014)

Soulja Boy Tell 'Em singles chronology
"Yasss Bish" (2014)	"Brazil We Flexing" (2014)

"Brazil We Flexing" is a single by Brazilian rapper MC Guimê, featuring American rapper Soulja Boy.

== Music video ==
The music video was released on September 22, 2014, 19:00 at the MC Guimê's channel in YouTube, and made available for digital download on iTunes on the same day. In just over forty-eight hours, the video exceeded the number of 1 million views on YouTube.

== Charts ==
Chart (2014)	Peak position
Brasil Hot 100 Airplay (Billboard)	61
