= Fernanda Paes Leme =

Brazilian actress (born 1983)

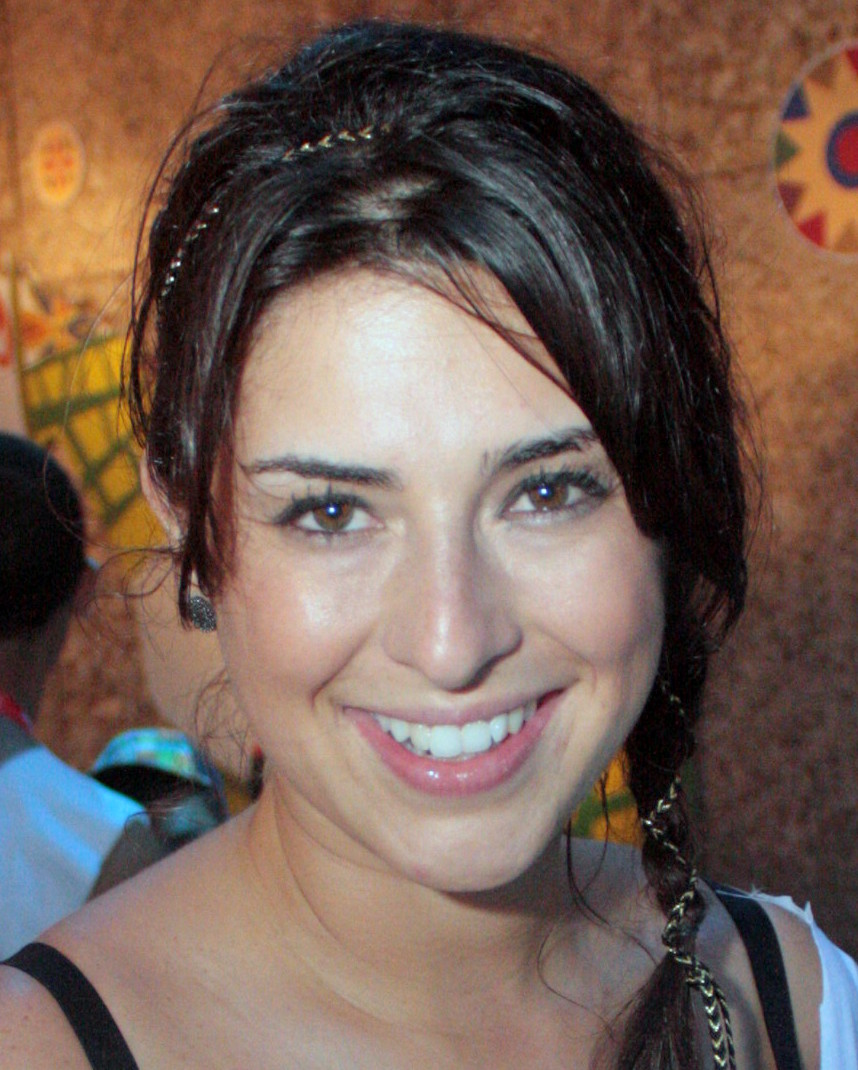
- Paes Leme at the Bahian Carnival in 2012
- Born: Fernanda Miranda Paes Leme de Abreu; 4 June 1983 (age 42); São Paulo, Brazil
- Occupation: Actress
- Years active: 1998–present

Fernanda Miranda Paes Leme de Abreu (born 4 June 1983) is a Brazilian actress.

== Biography ==
Daughter of the narrator and sports commentator Álvaro José, Paes Leme began her career as a child with interests in advertising campaigns. However, it would be revealed only in the show Sandy & Junior, Rede Globo, where she had her first professional acting job. She played a spoiled teenager, a character she played for four years.

Concluding this series, Paes Leme acted in Sítio do Picapau Amarelo, the telenovela Agora É que São Elas, and the miniseries Um Só Coração, all airing on the same station.

In 2009, Paes Leme participated in the novel Paraíso. Soon after, she landed the role of Dona Flor in the theatrical spectacle Dona Flor e Seus Dois Maridos, replacing Carol Castro.

In 2011, Paes Leme participated in the telenovela Insensato Coração.

== Filmography ==
=== Television ===
| Year | Title | Role | Notes |
|---|---|---|---|
| 1998 | Sandy & Junior | Patrícia (Patty) | 1998-2003 |
| 2003 | Sítio do Picapau Amarelo | Clarice | Cameo |
| 2003 | Agora É que São Elas | Karina | |
| 2004 | Um Só Coração | Elisa Furtado | |
| 2004 | Da Cor do Pecado | Nieta Bazaróv | Cameo |
| 2005 | América | Rosário | |
| 2006 | Dom | Cali | Globo TV Special |
| 2007 | Mandrake | Flora Green | Episode: "Lígia" |
| 2007 | Amazônia, de Galvez a Chico Mendes | Belinha | |
| 2007 | Desejo Proibido | Teresa Mendonça (Teresinha) | |
| 2008 | Casos e Acasos | Cristiane | Episode: "O Colchão, a Mala e a Balada" |
| 2008 | Faça Sua História | Evelyn | Episode: "A Herança de Napoleão" |
| 2009 | Paraíso | Maria Rosa Medeiros | |
| 2009 | Superbonita | Herself | Presenter |
| 2009 | Xuxa Especial de Natal | Blue Pastorinha | Christmas Special |
| 2010 | S.O.S. Emergência | Graça | Episode: "Várias Vezes ao Dia" |
| 2010 | Força-Tarefa | Estéfani | Episode: "Perda Total" |
| 2011 | Insensato Coração | Irene Brandão | |
| 2012 | As Brasileiras | Luiza | Episode: "A Reacionária do Pantanal" |
| 2012 | Salve Jorge | Márcia | |
| 2013 | Porta dos Fundos | Cláudia | Episódio: "Homens" |
| 2014 | Amor Veríssimo | six characters | |
| 2014 | Superstar | Herself | Presenter |
| 2016 | X Factor | Host | |
| 2024 | Benefits with Friends | Alice Santos | |
| 2025 | Dança dos Famosos | Contestant (19th place) | Season 22 |

=== Film ===
| Year | Title | Role |
|---|---|---|
| 2007 | O Homem Que Desafiou o Diabo | Genifer |
| 2007 | Podecrer! | Melissa |
| 2011 | Cilada.com | Fernanda |
| 2020 | Rich in Love | Alana |
