= Didi Wagner =

Brazilian television presenter (born 1975)

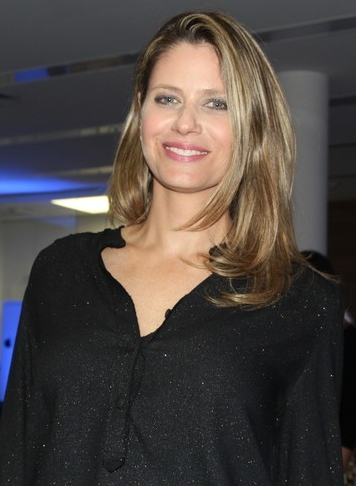
- Didi Wagner in 2015
- Born: October 16, 1975 (age 49); São Paulo, Brazil
- Occupation: Television presenter
- Spouse: Fred Wagner (1998–present)
- Children: 3

Adriana Golombek Wagner (born October 16, 1975), known as Didi Wagner, is a Brazilian television presenter.

== Biography ==
Wagner was born in São Paulo, Brazil. She is Jewish, a descendant of German Jews who immigrated to Brazil fleeing the war.

== Filmography ==
=== Television ===
Year	Title	Notes	TV Channel
2006	Lugar Incomum	Season: Brazil	Multishow
2008	Lugar Incomum	Season: New York	Multishow
2010	Lugar Incomum	Season: London	Multishow
2010	Lugar Incomum	Season: Berlin	Multishow
2011	Lugar Incomum	Season: Barcelona	Multishow
2011	Lugar Incomum	Season: Milan–Rome	Multishow
2012	Lugar Incomum	Season: Turkey	Multishow
2013	Lugar Incomum	Season: Paris	Multishow
2013	Lugar Incomum	Season: United States	Multishow
2014	Lugar Incomum	Season: Japan	Multishow
2014	Lugar Incomum	Season: Switzerland	Multishow
2015	Lugar Incomum	Season: Thailand	Multishow
2015	Lugar Incomum	Season: Portugal	Multishow
2016	Lugar Incomum	Season: Southern France	Multishow
2017	Lugar Incomum	Season: New Zealand	Multishow
2018	Lugar Incomum	Season: Czech Republic	Multishow
