= Bang (Anitta song) =

"Bang!"

Single by Anitta

from the album Bang!
- Language: Portuguese
- Released: October 9, 2015
- Recorded: 2014; U.M. Music Studios (Rio de Janeiro, Brazil)
- Genre: Pop; R&B; trap
- Length: 3:10
- Label: Warner Music
- Songwriters: Larissa Machado; Umberto Tavares; Jefferson Junior
- Producer: Umberto Tavares

Anitta singles chronology
"Deixa Ele Sofrer" (2015)	"Bang!" (2015)	"Blecaute" (2015)

Music video
- "Bang" on YouTube

"Bang!" is a song by Brazilian pop singer Anitta, from her third studio album of the same name (2015). It was written by the singer along with Umberto Tavares and Jefferson Junior. The producer Mãozinha was credited as co-producer. The song was released on 9 October 2015, serving as the second single from the album. The song has received over 416 million views on YouTube.

Upon release the song received mixed reviews from music critics, who praised its sound, but criticized the lyrics for being "weak". It managed to reach top ten on Billboard Hot 100 Airplay Brazil, and also managed to stand out in Brazil's regional charts, such as Fortaleza, Recife, Rio de Janeiro, São Paulo and Vitória. According to Anitta, "Bang" brings a "step by step" of how one should do to be in the same tune as another, also commenting that this can be sung for any type of audience, being, for this, a "singing of victory". A song about some kind of partnership, it's derived from the pop and trap genres, with electronic and funk influences from the 1970s.

The corresponding music video was directed by Bruno Ilogti, directed by Giovanni Bianco, with more than 50 professionals involved in the production. The intention was that the video would show a message of "strength, self-esteem, and at the same time a new step in [Anitta's] career."

A campaign was announced on Twitter, in which fans could earn the chance to attend the premiere party of the video. To achieve that, they should use a hashtag with the name of the song and the state the lived in. A controversy occurred during the promotion, when Cid, owner of famous Brazilian comedy website Não Salvo, told his followers to mention the state of Acre.

The song is featured on the music game Just Dance 2017.

== Background and cover ==
According to Anitta, the song was inspired by images created by Giovanni Bianco for her third studio album. The singer wanted the album to be "a clear shot:" "I told Giovanni that I wanted something revolutionary, that people would enjoy, something universal. He took this idea of 'power', of bang, of 'the right shot'. This happened seven months ago and the song didn't exist back then. Then I thought: 'I have to have song with this bang on it,'" leading the singer to write the song.

The single cover art was creative directed by Giovanni Bianco, the photo was taken by Gui Paganini, the styling was signed by Renata Correa and edited by Henrique Martins. In the picture, the singer appears wearing a revealing jumpsuit, fishnets and a thong.

== Composition ==
"Bang!" is in the key of B-minor (Bm) and has a tempo of 105 beats per minute (BPM). The song was a collaboration of Anitta with Umberto Tavares and Jefferson Junior, both of whom had worked with the singer previously; Mãozinha served as co-producer of the song. "Bang!" is primarily a pop song, with elements of trap and dancehall and sonic influences of electronica and funk of the 1970s, particularly through the notable use of horns and brass in the song's main theme. This has drawn some comparisons to other pop songs from the past, such as Amerie's "One Thing" (2005), Beyoncé's "Crazy in Love" (2003) and Jennifer Lopez's "Get Right" (2005).

Thematically, the song is about a partnership, either romantic, friendly, professional or otherwise. According to Anitta, "…one of the things the lyrics teach is a step-by-step [process] of how one should act to be in[-]synch with you," adding that "It is a song that can be sung to any kind of audience," and "it's a victory anthem".

== Music video ==
=== Background ===
The music video for "Bang" was directed by Bruno Ilogti, with art direction by Giovanni Bianco, with more than 50 professionals involved in the production. "That was the first video I left entirely on someone else's hands. I did not touch anything. I left Giovanni do it. I closed my eyes and trusted him. [The video] is amazing," she said. The singer wanted a video with "strength, self-esteem messages," but at the same time something that would be a "step up" in her career. She wanted it to be something that "people from zero to one hundred years of age would enjoy." The video was choreographed by Anitta herself, along with dancer Arielle. The singer commented on the production:

"What I liked on the video is that it is innovative, different. I think people will be amazed once again, no one expected it. The video is very similar to the album's booklet, it has a lot of sensuality and fun. In my other videos, I always directed and wrote along, but this time I closed my eyes and threw myself into Giovanni Bianco's ideas."

=== Release ===
The official premiere of the video was at New York City Center in Rio de Janeiro, and it was closed for 200 invited fans, media and part of the singer's family. Anitta asked people not to record or release anything onto the Internet before the official release of the video. There was a reinforced security scheme to prevent leaks, with all guests having to leave their cell phones at the entrance and pass by a metal detector. Even media outlets had to shut down their equipment while watching the video. The video premiered on YouTube on October 9, 2015, just before the singer presented a special edition of Multishow's TVZ, where it was screened again. The video was shot in black and white, with animation and color effects. With her dancers, Anitta performs wearing white panties over a garter belt.

=== Controversy ===
A few days before the release of the video, Anitta launched a campaign on Twitter, where fans could win an exclusive session with the singer to watch it by uploading a hashtag with the name of the single and its status. However, Maurício Cid, from the humorous website Não Salvo, decided to participate in the campaign. With more than 600,000 followers, Cid asked his followers to put the hashtag to take Anitta to Acre. The blogger's campaign became a success, ranking first in the most talked about subjects on the microblogging. However, Acre was second, losing to the state of Rio de Janeiro. Then Anitta answered Cid and asked for respect to Acre: "You should have more respect for the people of Acre. Mocking a state for being far from yours is highly ignorant." In November 2015, vlogger Kéfera Buchmann released a parody of the video and managed to hit the mark of 4 million views in 24 hours. Thus, the video surpassed even the original version, which achieved 2 million views in one day.

== Live presentations ==
The first live performance of "Bang" was at the children's concert Show das Poderosinhas, in Rio de Janeiro, on October 10, 2015. On October 25, Anitta went to Domingão do Faustão, Rede Globo, to publicize Bang. She introduced the song while wearing a transparent black dress with some stars. In November, the singer went to the Encontro com Fátima Bernardes from the same station to present the song. The host danced the choreography along with Anitta, becoming viral on the internet. The following month, another performance was made on the Record Network's Xuxa Meneghel Program along with the previous single. In December, after winning the award for best singer in the Best of the Year 2015, Anitta presented the song. In January 2016, Anitta went to the program Mais Você presented by Ana Maria Braga and sang the track together with "Deixa Ele Sofrer", wearing a yellow shorts and jacket.

== Cover versions ==
On August 26, 2016, the Brazilian singer Tiago Iorc released an acoustic version of the song on the digital platforms. On the same day, it was also released his music video, which currently has more than 5 million views on YouTube.

== Track listings ==
- CD single
1. "Bang" – 3:10
- Digital download
1. "Bang" – 3:10
2. "Bang" (English version) – 3:16

== Charts ==
=== Weekly charts ===
Chart (2015)	Peak position
Brazil (Billboard Hot 100)	9
