= Na Batida =

Single by Anitta

from the album Ritmo Perfeito
- Language: Portuguese
- Released: July 29, 2014
- Recorded: 2014; U.M. Music Studios (Rio de Janeiro, Brazil)
- Genre: Electropop
- Length: 2:43
- Label: Warner Music
- Songwriters: Anitta; Umberto Tavares; Jefferson Junior
- Producers: Umberto Tavares; Mãozinha

Anitta singles chronology
"Cobertor" (2014)	"Na Batida" (2014)	"Ritmo Perfeito" (2014)

Music video
- "Na Batida" on YouTube

"Na Batida" (transl. On The Beat) is a song by the Brazilian singer, songwriter and dancer Anitta. Recorded for her first live album Meu Lugar (2014) and her second studio album Ritmo Perfeito (2014), Anitta composed the song with Umberto Tavares and Jefferson Junior. The recording of the live version took place on February 15, 2014, at the HSBC Arena, while the studio edition was recorded at U.M. Music the same year. The track features a rapid tempo and derives from funk. Na Batida was released as the second single from the project on July 29, 2014 by Warner Music.

== Music video ==
The music video was released on YouTube on July 29, 2014.o Anitta used a thick stocking to record the video at the Cedros Palace in São Paulo, in early July. Recording went through the night until 3:00 on day 2. The production was from Conspiração Filmes and Sabrina Sato, Yan Acioli was responsible for the looks used by the singer, who was combed by Thiago Fortes and made up by Sandro Brizo. For the recording, she wore four different looks, from long dresses to low-cut bodies.

Anitta choreographed the song in multiple settings: a press conference, on the street, in a ballet studio, etc. Anitta has a rival who gets jealous of her boyfriend and deflates one of her tires. At the end of the clip, the rival's boyfriend takes Anitta on a motorcycle ride.

Anitta informed her fans on June 29 that it would only be released after 500,000 hits with the hashtag "#AnittaNaBatida" showed up on Facebook, Twitter and Google+. The test was passed the same day. The music video has surpassed 100 million views on YouTube, the singer's fourth to reach that mark.

== Promotion ==
The singer presented the song live on the television shows Encontro Com Fátima Bernardes on June 11, 2014, Esquenta! on July 13, 2014, on July 26, 2014, on Altas Horas and on October 17, 2014 on Programa do Jô.

== Track listings ==
- CD single
1. "Na Batida" – 2:43
- Digital download
1. "Na Batida" – 2:43
2. "Na Batida" (video music) – 3:29

== Charts ==
Chart (2014)	Peak position
Brazil (Brasil Hot 100 Airplay)	3
Brazil (Billboard)	4

== Awards and nominations ==
Year	Awards ceremony	Award	Results	Ref.
2014	Prêmio F5	Hit of the Year	Nominated	
2014	Multishow Brazilian Music Award	Best Music Video	Won	
