= Lexa (singer) =

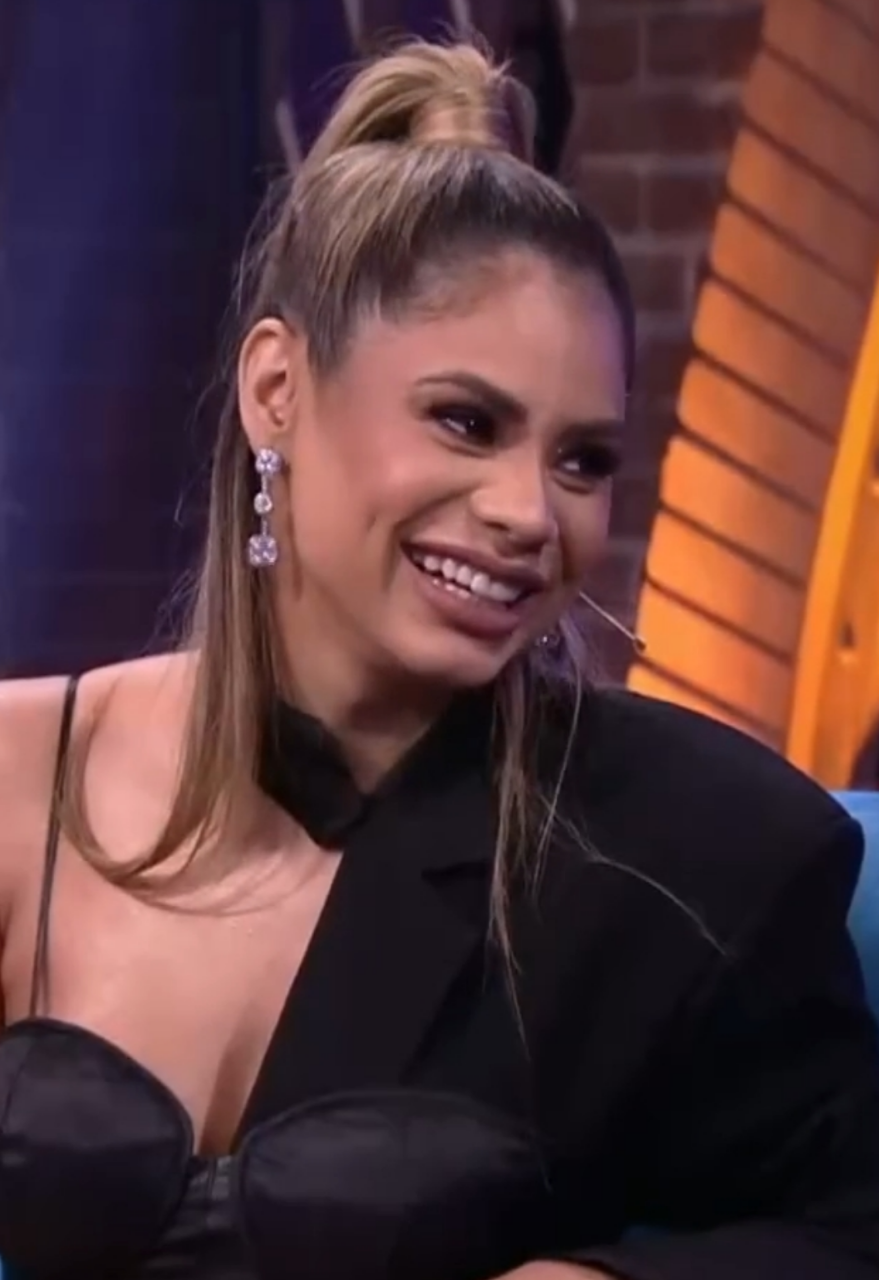
- Lexa in 2022
- Born: Léa Cristina Araújo da Fonseca; February 22, 1995 (age 31); Rio de Janeiro, Brazil
- Occupations: Singer; songwriter; dancer
- Years active: 2013–present
- Spouse: MC Guimê (m. 2018)
- Musical career
- Genres: Pop; EDM; funk melody
- Label: Som Livre

Léa Cristina Lexa Araújo da Fonseca (born February 22, 1995), better known by her stage name Lexa, is a Brazilian singer, songwriter and dancer.

== Biography ==
Léa Cristina Araujo da Fonseca, known professionally as Lexa, was born in the city of Rio de Janeiro on February 22, 1995, to music producer Darlin Ferrattry. The stage name "Lexa" was created by adding an 'x' to her birth-name, Léa as a tribute to Brazilian presenter Xuxa Meneghel. She joined the Brazilian carnival at a very young age because her mother had a lot of roles inside Samba schools, which influenced her a lot to start her professional career. She learned to play the tambourine when she was 11 years old, and after this, she started her artistic career. She was the muse of Mocidade drums (a famous Samba School), also the queen of Unidos de Bangu, and now she is the queen of Unidos da Tijuca, as she mentioned in an interview with Vanity Teen Magazine.

== Career ==
=== 2014–present: Disponível ===
Lexa's first single, Posso Ser, was released in December 2014. The song was featured on Brazil Hot 100 Airplay Top 30 singles. The extended play (EP) contains three new tracks in addition to the 2014 single. The same EP was re-released in April 2015 and also included the bonus track "Delete". Later that year Lexa launched a second song,"Parra de Marra" whose music video was released the following month.

Disponível, Lexa's debut album, launched on September 18, 2015, under the Som Livre label. The album consists of thirteen tracks and includes compositions from Naldo Benny, Umberto Tavares, Batutinha and the artist herself. The title track, "Disponível" was released the same month as the first single. On December 12, 2015, Lexa began the Disponível Tour with a debut show in Rio de Janeiro.

==== Management ====
Lexa formerly partnered with Kamilla Fialho, of K2l, in launching her career. The partnership ended, with Lexa choosing to leave the company. A suit was later filed by Fialho concerning the right to use the name "Lexa" after Araújo's departure. The dispute was settled out of court, with both parties reported as satisfied with the outcome. Lexa was reported in May 2016, as having joined the Mallupy Entertainment group, owned by Netto Maluppy and Thiago Basso.

== Personal life ==
Lexa has been dating rapper MC Guimê since December 2015. They became engaged in 2017.

In 2022, Lexa and MC Guimê performed together dressed as Maria Bonita and Lampião in the reality singing competition The Masked Singer Brasil.

== Awards and nominations ==
Year	Award	Category	Nomination	Result	Ref.
2015	Meus Prêmios Nick	Revelação Musical	Lexa	Nominated	
2015	Prêmio Jovem Brasileiro	Cantora Revelação	Lexa	Won	
2015	Geração Z Awards	Música Nacional	"Posso Ser"	Nominated	
2015	Geração Z Awards	Clipe Nacional	"Posso Ser"	Nominated	
2015	Geração Z Awards	Revelação Nacional	Lexa	Nominated	
2015	Geração Z Awards	Cantora Nacional	Lexa	Nominated	
2015	Radio Music Awards Brasil	Revelação	Lexa	Won	
2015	Radio Music Awards Brasil	Melhor Música Emocional	"Pior Que Sinto Falta"	Nominated	
2015	Radio Music Awards Brasil	Melhor Coreografia	"Para de Marra"	Nominated	
2015	Capricho Awards	Revelação Nacional	Lexa	Nominated	
2016	Radio Music Awards Brasil	Artista do Ano	Lexa	Nominated	
2016	Radio Music Awards Brasil	Melhor Coreografia	"Se Eu Mandar" – Lexa	Nominated	
2018	International Golden Panther Music Awards	Best Brazilian Artist	Lexa	Nominated	
2019	MTV Millennial Awards Brasil	Danceokê	"Sapequinha"	Nominated	
2019	Prêmio Jovem Brasileiro	Feat do ano (com Glória)	"Provocar”	Nominated	
2019	Prêmio Jovem Brasileiro	Hit do ano	"Provocar”	Nominated	
2019	Prêmio Multishow de Música Brasileira	Clipe TVZ do ano	"Amor Bandido”	Nominated	
2020	MTV Millennial Awards Brasil	Feat Nacional	"Combatchy"	Won	
2020	Prêmio Jovem Brasileiro	Best Singer	Lexa	Nominated	
2020	Prêmio Jovem Brasileiro	Hino do Ano	"Combatchy"	Nominated	
2020	Prêmio Jovem Brasileiro	Melhor Feat	"Combatchy"	Nominated	
2020	Prêmio Jovem Brasileiro	Melhor Feat	"Chama Ela"	Nominated	
2020	BreakTudo Awards	Clipe Nacional	"Chama Ela"	Nominated	
2020	BreakTudo Awards	Clipe Nacional	"Combatchy"	Nominated	

== Discography ==
- Disponível (2015)
- LEXA (2020)
- Mania (2024)

== Tours ==
=== Headlining ===
- Disponível Tour (2015–2016)
- Turnê Só Depois do Carnaval (2019-2020)
- Turnê LEXA (2021-2022)

=== Opening act ===
- Tour Love (Maite Perroni) (2016)

=== Reality and variety shows ===
Year	Title	Network	Role	Notes
2015–2016	Diário da Lexa	MTV	herself	
2021	Wild & Free	Amazon Prime Video	herself	Panelist
