= Beijinho no Ombro =

Single by Valesca Popozuda
- Released: August 1, 2013
- Genre: Pop; Funk carioca
- Length: 3:00
- Songwriters: André Vieira, Leandro Castro, Wallace Vianna

Valesca Popozuda singles chronology
"Beijinho no Ombro" (2013)	"Tá para Nascer Homem que Vai Mandar em Mim" (2014)

Music video
- "Beijinho no Ombro" on YouTube

"Beijinho no Ombro" (lit. Little Kiss on the Shoulder), is the debut single of Brazilian funk carioca performer Valesca Popozuda of Gaiola das Popozudas fame, released on 1 August 2013. It was composed by Wallace Vianna, André Vieira and Leandro Parda.

== Release and impact ==
Due to the success of the song's video (see below), Popozuda was invited to many television programs to perform her song. These programs include Domingão do Faustão, Legendários, Encontro com Fátima Bernardes, Caldeirão do Huck, Programa do Ratinho and Mais Você.

At Domingão do Faustão, actress Susana Vieira sang "Beijinho no Ombro", which generated reactions at the social networks. On 24 February 2014, a video with the University of São Paulo choir and the Bateria de Agravado de Instrumento of São Francisco Law School performing the song for the new students was published.

== In popular culture ==
=== Advertisements ===
For the 2014 carnaval season, Rio de Janeiro's State Health Secretary chose the song to support their "Beijinho no Ombro e Camisinha no Bolso" (Little Kiss on the Shoulder and Condom in the Pocket) campaign. Other celebrities, such as David Brazil and Lorena Simpson, also took part of the campaign.

== Music video ==
A teaser of the video was revealed on 21 November 2013. In order to release it, she could have had it featured at Rede Globo's "Fantástico", but she opted to release it at her YouTube channel. on 27 December 2013.

In its first day, the video was watched 500,000 times, reaching the 690,000 mark the day after, and 1 million in its third day, being heavily shared at social networks. On 27 February 2014, the video had over 9 million hits and 100,000 Facebook "likes";

The video was shot at Castelo de Itaipa (Itaipava Castle), in Petrópolis, Rio de Janeiro. All clothes worn by Popozuda were created with imported metallic textiles - such material was only used by the medieval nobility, in order to express "strength and mood". In the video, Popozuda performs with a tiger and an eagle. She spent two weeks having classes with an animal tamer for the tiger, and three days training with the eagle. Valesca spent a total of R$ 437,000, some US$ 200,000.

== Cover versions ==
=== Dulce María version ===
"Besito al Hombro" is the Spanish-language version of the hit, recorded as a duet between Popozuda and Dulce María. Dulce came to Brazil and liked the song, so the invited Popozuda to fly to Mexico and record the new version. The song is due to be released in both Brazil and Mexico shortly before the 2014 FIFA World Cup.

== Charts ==
Chart (2014)	Peak position
Brazil - (Brasil Hot 100 Airplay)	32
Brazil - Brasil Hot Pop & Popular	5
Brazil - São Paulo Hot Songs	3
Brazil - Rio de Janeiro Hot Songs	1
