= MC Guimê =

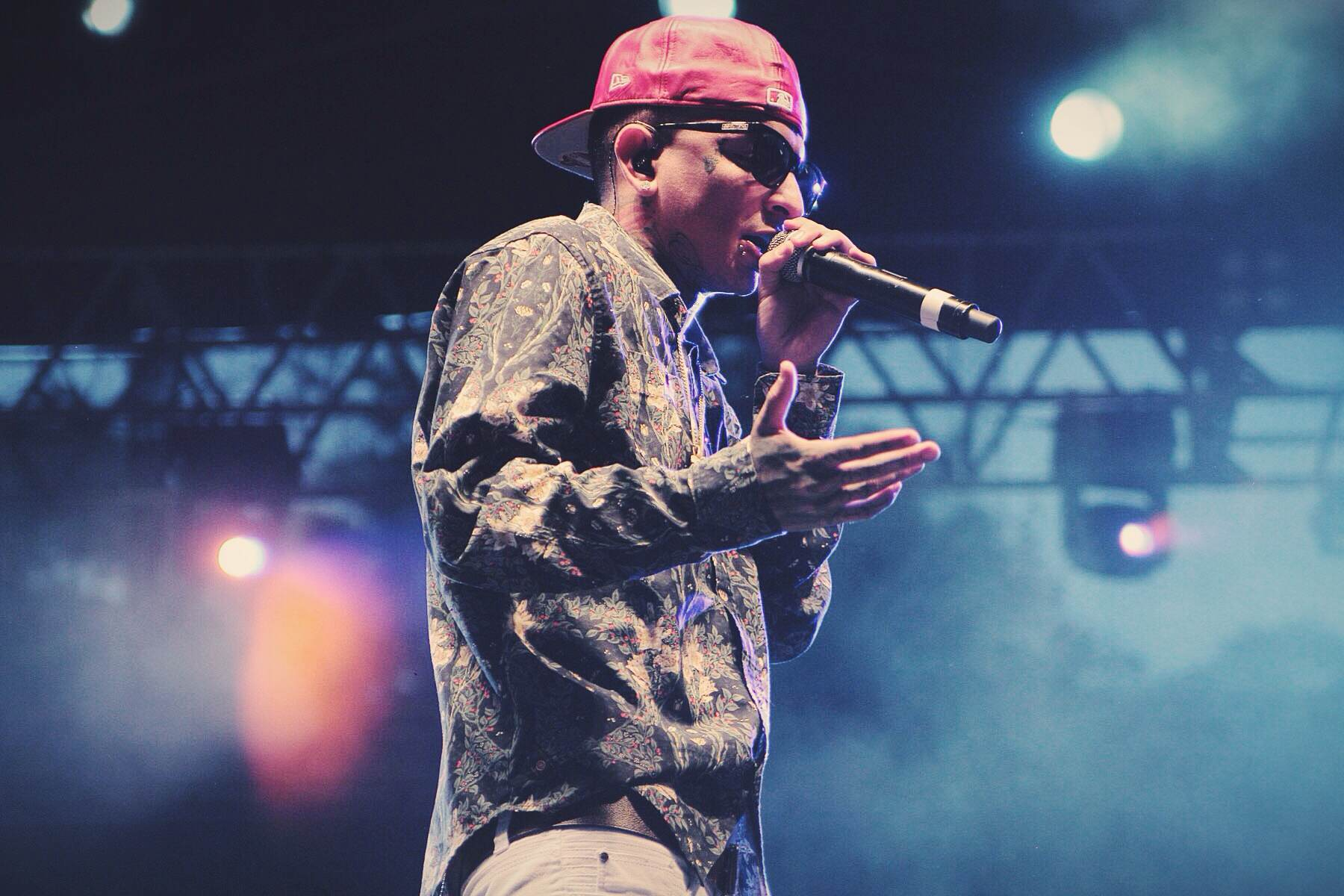
- MC Guime in live performance at São Paulo.
- Born: Guilherme Aparecido Dantas; 10 November 1992 (age 33); Osasco, São Paulo, Brazil
- Occupations: Singer; songwriter
- Years active: 2010–present
- Spouse: Lexa (m. 2018)
- Musical career
- Genres: Hip hop; Funk ostentação
- Label: Maximo

Guilherme Aparecido Dantas, better known by his stage name MC Guimê, is a Brazilian funk singer (born 10 November 1992). He has been nominated for several awards such as Europe Music Awards, Kids Choice Awards, Meus Prêmios Nick (KCA's Brazil), Prêmio Multishow, and Dubai Music Awards.

== Early life ==
Dantas was born and raised in Osasco by his father, Paulo. At the age of 16, Dantas started to write his first songs.

== Career ==
Guimê started his career in 2009, after being discovered by his manager while distributing flyers. After his first smash hit "Tá Patrão", Guimê got an average of 40 shows a month; after his second single 'Plaque de 100', he was considered a popular artist. His third single was "Na Pista Eu Arraso" and the fourth was "País do Futebol". País do Futebol was the unofficial soccer anthem for the 2014 FIFA World Cup in Brazil and was featured on several websites around the world. País do Futebol placed first in every chart in Brazil and on iTunes.

In 2014, Guime released his newest single, "Brazil We Flexing", featuring Soulja Boy. It was the first official international feature by Guime. Maximo, the rights holder, says it is the first of at least seven big collaborations with international artists to be released between 2014 and 2015.

Guime has the biggest numbers in the history of Brazilian YouTube in the Music category, with 4 music videos resulting in a combined 270 million views on his official channel. He was the first artist to place 3 singles in a row with more than 40 million views, and with "País do Futebol" he became the first to reach 1 million views on a music video in one day. All videos are held by Maximo YouTube Network, belonging to Maximo Music Label.

In 2022, MC Guimê and Lexa performed together cosplayed as Lampião and Maria Bonita in the reality singing competition The Masked Singer Brasil. In 2023, he was cast as contestant in the reality show Big Brother Brasil 23.

== Singles ==
- "Tá Patrão"
- "Plaquê de 100"
- "Na Pista eu Arraso"
- "País do Futebol" (feat. Emicida)
- "Brazil We Flexing" (feat. Soulja Boy)
