= Nove Mil Anjos =

Brazilian alternative rock group

- Also known as: 9MA
- Origin: São Paulo, São Paulo, Brazil
- Genres: Alternative rock, pop rock, indie rock, funk rock
- Years active: 2008–2009
- Labels: 9MA Music
- Past members: Junior Lima; Peu Sousa; Champignon; Perí Carpigiani

Nove Mil Anjos (Portuguese for "Nine Thousand Angels"), also referred to as 9MA, was a short-lived Brazilian alternative rock band from São Paulo.

== History ==
Nove Mil Anjos was conceived by Junior Lima in 2008, one year after the break-up of Sandy & Junior, the duo he was a part of alongside his sister Sandy which acquired massive success throughout the 1990s and the 2000s. Besides Lima, who was the drummer, the band also comprised guitarist Peu Sousa (previously a live musician for singer Pitty), bassist Champignon (of Charlie Brown Jr. and Revolucionnários) and vocalist Péricles "Perí" Carpigiani. The band's name, however, was suggested by Sousa, who claimed it came to him through a dream. Later that year they released their first single, "Chuva Agora", through their official Myspace page, and made their debut show at the MTV Video Music Brazil award ceremony in October.

In mid-October the band travelled to Los Angeles to work on their debut album, 9MA, alongside producer Sebastian Krys. It was released to mostly positive reviews.

By late 2009, creative divergences between the band members led Lima to put the group on hold. Following the suicides of Sousa and Champignon in May and September 2013 respectively, any possibilities of a reunion ended.

== Discography ==
=== Studio album ===
Year	Album
2008	9MA: Label: 9MA Music; Format: CD

=== Singles ===
Year	Single	Album
2008	"Chuva Agora"	9MA
2008	"Visionário"	9MA
