= 9MA =

2008 studio album by Nove Mil Anjos

Studio album by Nove Mil Anjos
- Released: 2008
- Recorded: 2008
- Genres: Alternative rock; pop rock; funk rock; indie rock
- Length: 44:01
- Label: 9MA Music
- Producer: Sebastian Krys

Singles from 9MA
- 1. "Chuva Agora" Released: 2008; 2. "Visionário" Released: 2008

9MA is the only release by Brazilian alternative rock band Nove Mil Anjos. It came out in 2008 through the band's own label, 9MA Music, and distributed by Sky Blue Music. Produced in Los Angeles by Sebastian Krys, who previously worked with drummer Junior Lima's former group Sandy & Junior, the album spawned the singles "Chuva Agora" (made available for listening in advance through the band's official Myspace page) and "Visionário".

Upon its release 9MA received mostly positive reviews, with the music video for "Chuva Agora" being at one point one of the most viewed at the website of now-defunct MTV Brasil. Conversely, music critic Amauri Stamboroski Jr., writing for website G1, gave the album a scathing review, calling it a "disastrous" and "unoriginal" output and comparing it unfavorably to the sonority of bands such as Red Hot Chili Peppers, Rage Against the Machine and Nirvana. He then proceeded to give the album a rating of 1 out of a possible 10.

== Track listing ==
All tracks are written by Nove Mil Anjos.

No.	Title	English title	Length
1.	"Ainda Há Tempo"	There's Still Time	3:34
2.	"O Rio"	The River	3:31
3.	"Visionário"	Visionary	3:51
4.	"Espelho"	Mirror	4:07
5.	"Mágica"	Magic	4:16
6.	"Projétil"	Projectile	3:57
7.	"Stripper"		3:59
8.	"A Ilha"	The Island	3:36
9.	"Sem Deixar"	Without Letting It	2:43
10.	"Chuva Agora"	Rain Now	3:12
11.	"Vício"	Vice	3:27
12.	"Misturando Coisas"	Mixing Things Up	3:41

== Personnel ==
- Péricles "Perí" Carpigiani – vocals
- Junior Lima – drums
- Champignon – bass guitar
- Peu Sousa – electric guitar
- Sebastian Krys – production
