= Matriz =

Matriz may refer to the following subjects:

== Places in Portugal ==
- Matriz (Borba), a civil parish in the municipality of Borba
- Matriz (Horta), a civil parish in the municipality of Horta, island of Faial (Azores)
- Matriz (Ribeira Grande), a civil parish in the municipality of Ribeira Grande, island of São Miguel (Azores)
- Matriz, the former name of São Sebastião (Ponta Delgada), a civil parish in the municipality of Ponta Delgada, island of São Miguel (Azores)

== Other uses ==
- Matriz (album), by Brazilian singer-songwriter Pitty
