= Junior Lima =

Brazilian musician and record producer (born 1984)

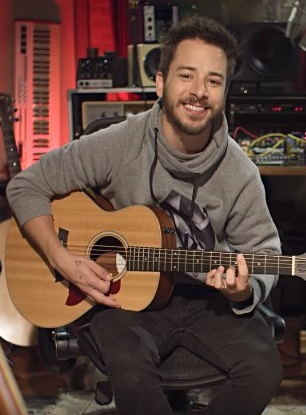
- Lima in 2019
- Born: Durval de Lima Júnior; April 11, 1984 (age 42); Campinas, São Paulo, Brazil
- Occupations: Singer-songwriter, drummer, guitarist, actor, record producer
- Years active: 1989–present
- Spouse: Mônica Benini (m. 2014)
- Children: 2
- Relatives: Sandy (sister); Xororó (father); Noely Pereira de Lima (mother); Chitãozinho (uncle)
- Musical career
- Genres: Rock; pop; electronic; children's music (early); sertanejo (early)
- Instruments: Vocals, drums, guitar

Durval de Lima Júnior (born April 11, 1984), better known by his stage name Junior Lima, is a Brazilian singer-songwriter, drummer, guitarist, actor and record producer best known for his work with duo Sandy & Junior.

== Biography ==
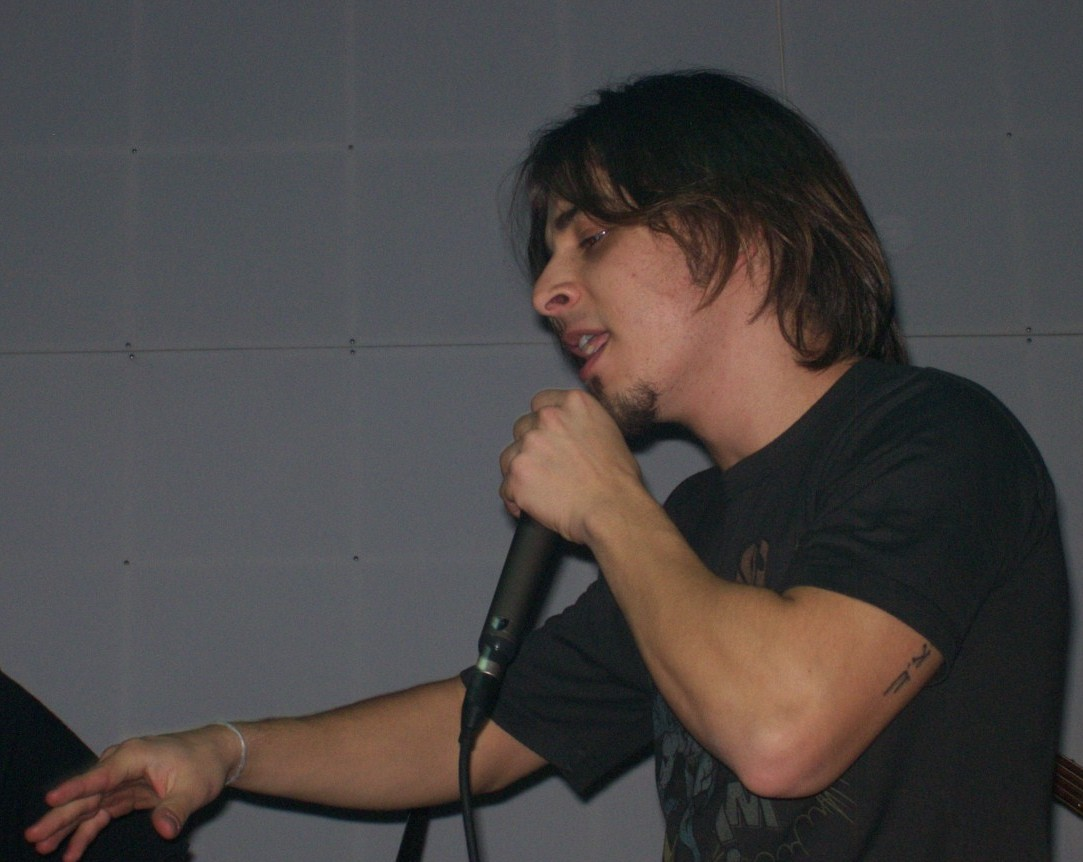
Lima performing with SoulFunk in 2007

Durval de Lima Júnior was born in Campinas, São Paulo on April 11, 1984, to entrepreneur Noely Pereira de Lima and singer Durval de Lima, better known as "Xororó" of the famous música sertaneja duo Chitãozinho & Xororó. Interested in music ever since his early childhood, in 1989 he began to perform alongside his older sister Sandy in Brazilian television as child singers, under the moniker Sandy & Junior. In 1991 the duo released their debut album, Aniversário do Tatu, which sold over 300,000 copies, and as the 1990s and 2000s went by they became one of the most successful Brazilian groups of all time, leading them to have their own TV series on Rede Globo (broadcast from 1999 to 2002) and starring on their own full-length film, 2003's Acquária. By the time they broke up in 2007, they sold over 22 million albums nationwide. Alongside Sandy & Junior he had a side project named SoulFunk which lasted from 2005 to 2007.

One year after the break-up of Sandy & Junior he formed the supergroup Nove Mil Anjos, alongside other established musicians such as Peu Sousa, a former guitarist for singer Pitty, and former Charlie Brown Jr. and Revolucionnários bassist Champignon. The only newcomer was vocalist Péricles "Perí" Carpigiani. Lima was the band's drummer. They only released a single studio album, 9MA, before being put on hold in 2009; any possibilities of a reunion ended after the suicides of Sousa and Champignon in 2013.

From 2009 to 2014, alongside DJ Júlio Torres and Amon-Rá Lima of Família Lima, he was part of electronica group Crossover, later renamed as Dexterz. In 2016, Junior and Torres reunited to form the duo Manimal. The same year he debuted as a record producer, collaborating with Manu Gavassi on her extended play Vício, and released the single "Sintoma", his first work as a solo singer in years. On October 30, 2023, Lima's debut solo album, Solo, Vol. 1, recorded between 2020–2022, was released, receiving mostly negative reviews; a follow-up came out on May 23, 2024, to a slightly better critical reception.

From 2017 to 2019 he was co-host of the YouTube series Pipocando Música, a spin-off of Pipocando, alongside Bruno Bock.

In 2019 Sandy & Junior reunited for a special series of tours around Brazil celebrating their 30th anniversary.

== Personal life ==
Lima is married to model Mônica Benini since 2014; the couple's first child, a son, Otto, was born on October 1, 2017. On October 10, 2021, their daughter Lara was born. Previously, he dated actresses Bruna Thedy (whom he met during production of the Sandy & Junior TV series) and, from 2005 to 2007, Julia Faria.

He has a black belt in Brazilian Jiu-Jitsu and earned the belt after 11 years of training.

== Discography ==
- Solo, Vol. 1 (2023)
- Solo, Vol. 2 (2024)
