= Internacional (album) =

Studio album by Sandy & Junior
- Released: June 4, 2002
- Recorded: 2002
- Genre: Teen pop; dance-pop; R&B
- Length: 46:13
- Label: Universal Music
- Producer: Tony Swain

Sandy & Junior chronology
Sandy & Junior (2001)	Internacional (2002)	Ao Vivo no Maracanã (2002)

Singles from Internacional
- 1. "Love Never Fails" Released: June 11, 2002; 2. "Words Are Not Enough" Released: September 23, 2002; 3. "When You Need Somebody" Released: December 11, 2002

Internacional (titled Sandy & Junior in many countries) is the tenth studio album by Brazilian duo Sandy & Junior, released on June 4, 2002. The album was released in various territories, such as the United States, Europe and Latin America.

Main working song: "Love Never Fails" whose music video was recorded March 14 and 15 in Miami Beach, Florida, United States. The album released in Brazil consists of 14 tracks (13 songs and the multimedia track with the video of "Love Never Fails" and other items). The video has occupied several times the 1st place in the Italian and Brazilian MTV.

The duo managed to succeed in Europe in countries such as Portugal, Spain, Italy and Latin America (Mexico and Chile). Sandy won the awards at the International Song Festival of Viña del Mar, Queen of the Festival - Internet Voting and Miss Congeniality of the Festival - Official Voting.

== Background and development ==
Having sold more than 10 million copies with their records, Universal Music decided to invest in the duo's international career, which until then had experimented only with Portuguese versions of songs by foreign artists such as Savage Garden, Celine Dion, Bee Gees, Whitney Houston, among others. In the previous album, the pair even recorded "Endless Love", but this time in its original English version and the song was taken as a preview of the international work that was to follow. The duo recorded 12 songs in English in mid-2001, at studios in Miami and Los Angeles. The initiative to launch the duo in the international market was Max Hole, who was marketing director of Universal Music of England. The investment in the album was 1 million dollars and five producers were contracted, being only one Brazilian. The so-called "Sandy and Junior operation," from Universal, predicted it would require $1.5 million in investment to turn the brothers into international stars. The businessman responsible for their international career was Richard Ogden, who worked with Paul McCartney's carat stars.

"It has been so exciting to work with people we never thought we would meet, like Dianne Warren," said Junior; "Yes, I'm a big fan of her, so it was an exciting time. She's great, and so much fun," Sandy added.

The production is by Simon Franglen, producer of stars of the size of Celine Dion, Madonna, Michael Jackson, Toni Braxton, and Steve Robson, who produces Bryan Adams.

Five of the album's songs were recorded by other artists previously, namely: "Love Never Fails" (the singer Kathie Lee Gifford in 2000 on his album Heart of a Woman), "Words Are Not Enough" (the English band Steps in 2001), "Do Not Say You Love Me" (by the group The Corrs in 1997 on her album Talk On Corners), "We've Only Just Begun" (the duo The Carpenters in 1970 on the album Close to You) and "Whenever You Close Your Eyes" (by singer Tommy Page in 1991 on his album From the Heart).

== Release ==
The album was released in June 2002, for the release, trips by several countries were marked. In Germany, the duo even featured in The Dome and the German version of Top of the Pops, where they sang with band and dancers "Love never fails" (twice), as well as "Words Are Not Enough?". They gave interviews to newspapers and magazines, as well as to radio stations in the country (such as RTL 2). Following the course, the duo drove in Spain, going to the studios of Musica 3 TV, where they performed "El Amor No Fallara" and "Convince Al Corazon". Completing the series of TV presentations in the country, they still performed at A Tu Lado, MTV España, Nickelodeon España, Musica Si ("Convence Al Corazon"). There were also interviews for Radio Club 25 and the radio station Marca. The duo then went on to Switzerland (where they did an acoustic of some songs at a European MD's dinner) and Puerto Rico. Other countries visited were Portugal, Chile and Mexico. The International album was released with different tracks in various parts of the world, so in 2003, the Universal Music label decided to release all the tracks not released in Brazil on CD 2 of the album Ao Vivo no Maracanã, excluding only remixes in Spanish and French.

Later, Sandy said that "[the international career] was a step that we did not even dream of giving, but we received invitations and we were taking." The thing happened and, when we saw it, we were doing it in Spain, Italy, Germany, Latin America, It was really cool." Although the brothers claimed they would reissue the album after releasing a Portuguese album and recording a film, their promotion was halted in mid-2003 because of "the pressure of working away from home, parents and friends," said Junior.

"There are people who sees it as another step in the career and have people think that is the chance of life. But to me it was the opposite, and that's why I stopped. It kind of was being taken. The Universal London was watching. It was a decision in which I did not have time to think and to mature.When I saw it, it was there.It was very young, I was in a whirlwind of work.I had to turn into three: program at Globo, soap opera, finishing school. in Portugal, I sang in French, we were in the top 10 in Spain, first on MTV Italy ... Oh my God, today I look back and I do not know how I realized all this. I'm one, I'm satisfied with my career in Brazil. And I do not want to live just to work, I want to enjoy the things that the career brings me. My life is here. "- Sandy talking about her international career in an interview for Billboard Brasil in 2010.

== Critical reception ==
Professional ratings
Review scores
Source	Rating
Allmusic	3/5 stars
CliqueMusic	2/5 stars
O Globo	Unfavorable
Billboard Magazine	Favorable
Isto É Gente	2/5 stars

Specialist reviews were mixed. Drago Bonacich, of the American site Allmusic, defined the album as: "all R&B and Latin pop, with refined and sentimental performances". Marco Antonio Barbosa, from the Brazilian site CliqueMusic, made a negative criticism of the release and chose "We've Only Just Begun", as "the highlight of the album, although half compromised by the standardized arrangement." Antonio Carlos Miguel, the newspaper O Globo made a bad review, noting: "Lack identity in a succession of ballads and dance songs that abuse cliches of this genre." Leila Cobo from Billboard Magazine, said that the use of acoustic instruments gave the album a more intimate sound, adding, "Everything is pleasurable, beautifully done and totally mainstream.". Mauro Ferreira of Istoé Gente magazine, made a critical review of the album, saying "the sound of the pair is sugary and boring." Sandy misses his voice tuned in predictable ballads like "When You Need Somebody" and "Do not Say You Love Me". But the worst are tracks like "Must Be Magic", as the duo tries to break into the dancing beat of teenage muses like Britney Spears.

== Commercial performance ==
The album came to be in first place among the most sold albums of Rio de Janeiro and in the fourth position in São Paulo, in the list of the magazine ISTOÉ Gente. Some media outlets reported that the CD would have sold 350,000 copies, another 500,000, while others say about 700,000 copies in Brazil alone, however the CD won platinum disc, for sales of more than 250 thousand copies, according to Pro-Música Brasil (PMB). It was the 9th best selling cd of 2002, according to PMB. In just one month, the album was already certificate Gold in Portugal. The album was Portugal's 29th best selling album in 2002, according to the Associação Fonográfica Portuguesa (AFP).

== Track listing ==
1. Love Never Fails 3:36
2. Words Are Not Enough 3:18
3. Right Thing To Do 3:42
4. When You Need Somebody 3:59
5. Don't Say You Love Me 4:37
6. Precious Time 3:27
7. Must Be Magic 3:11
8. We've Only Just Begun 3:33
9. Don't Run Away With My Heart 3:51
10. This Is Me 4:05
11. Whenever You Close Your Eyes 4:44
12. Until I See You Again 3:52
13. Wannabee Where You Are 3:34
14. The Moon And The Deep Sea (A lenda) 4:26
15. I Will Lift You Up (As quatro estações) 3:59

== Charts ==
=== Year-end charts ===
Chart (2002)	Peak position
Brazil (Pro-Música Brasil)	9

== Certifications ==
Region	Certification	Certified units/sales
Brazil (Pro-Música Brasil)	Platinum	750,000
