= Brian Gardner =

American recording engineer

- Also known as: Big Bass; Big Boss
- Born: Brian Knapp Gardner
- Origin: Idaho, U.S.
- Genres: Rock; funk; disco; alternative rock; R&B; hip hop; pop punk; dance-pop
- Occupation: Mastering engineer
- Website: bigbassbrian.com

Brian Knapp Gardner, also known as Brian "Big Bass" Gardner, is an American mastering engineer. He has worked on a number of recordings since the mid-1960s, including classic rock, funk, disco, alternative rock, R&B, hip hop, pop punk and dance-pop. He is known for his work on hip hop albums, including collaborations with Dr. Dre, who gave him the nickname "Big Bass".

He was last employed at Bernie Grundman Mastering, a mastering house founded and run by Bernie Grundman, and is now independent.

== Discography ==
Gardner has over 750 credits, including:

- Pitty - Anacrônico (2005)
- En Vogue ― Funky Divas (1992)
- 2Pac ― All Eyez On Me (1996)
- Janet Jackson ― The Velvet Rope (1997)
- Fastball ― All the Pain Money Can Buy (1998)
- Eminem ― The Slim Shady LP (1999)
- Blink 182 ― Enema of the State (1999)
- Mónica Naranjo— Palabra de Mujer (1998)
- Smash Mouth ― Astro Lounge (1999)
- Tyler, the Creator ― Wolf (2013) Slim Dee ― Unico (2018)

== Approach ==
Gardner's style is to compress music to the point of distortion, in order to make it sound louder.

He has been nominated eight times for the Grammy Award for Album of the Year award, winning it once for the Outkast album Speakerboxxx/The Love Below.
