= Admirável Chip Novo =

Studio album by Pitty
- Released: 3 April 2003
- Recorded: 2002–2003
- Genres: Hard rock; alternative rock
- Length: 39:21
- Labels: Deckdisc; Polysom
- Producer: Rafael Ramos

Pitty chronology
| Admirável Chip Novo (2003) | Anacrônico (2005) |

Singles from Admirável Chip Novo
- 1. "Máscara" Released: 21 March 2003; 2. "Admirável Chip Novo" Released: 5 August 2003; 3. "Teto de Vidro" Released: 21 November 2003; 4. "Equalize" Released: 28 April 2004; 5. "Semana que Vem" Released: 3 November 2004; 6. "I Wanna Be" Released: February 2005

Admirável Chip Novo is the debut studio album by Brazilian artist Pitty. It was released on 3 April 2003 through the independent label Deckdisc. After stepping away from her role as vocalist for the hardcore punk band Inkoma, Pitty continued composing new songs but had no immediate plans to record them. In 2002, she was approached by producer and Deckdisc executive Rafael Ramos, who requested a cassette tape of her compositions featuring her voice and acoustic guitar. After reviewing the material, he signed her to the label under a multi-album deal. Pitty traveled to Rio de Janeiro to work on the album with musicians such as Joe, Peu Sousa, and Duda Machado. The album features 11 original tracks, all written solely by Pitty except for one co-written song. Musically, it blends hard rock and alternative rock, with lyrics that critique social norms and consumerism.

Admirável Chip Novo received mixed reviews from music critics, who praised it as a strong debut project. At the 2004 Latin Grammy Awards, the album was nominated for Best Brazilian Rock Album. Commercially, it became the album through which Pitty was "discovered" and gained nationwide recognition in Brazil. It was certified platinum, recognizing over 200,000 copies sold.

Six singles were released from the album, including "Máscara", "Admirável Chip Novo", and "Teto de Vidro", whose music videos became hits on television channels and were featured in TV soundtracks. Additionally, the videos earned Pitty multiple nominations at the MTV Video Music Brazil over the next two years. To promote the album, Pitty performed on several TV shows and embarked on a nationwide tour. Retrospectively, critics highlight the album's influence on Brazilian popular music at the time, particularly how it helped reinvent Brazilian rock in the mainstream culture of the 2000s. They also emphasize how Pitty drew younger audiences to the genre during an era dominated by romantic pop artists.

== Background and production ==
"I had the songs with just voice and guitar, so there was a pre-production [for the album] with the guys [instrumentalists] and Rafa[el] overseeing it. We all worked on the arrangements, and during recording, a lot was experimented and created. Working with Rafael is fun, delightful—we're like siblings and share the same influences. He's sharp, music-savvy, knows the classics, and seeks the new."

— Pitty discussing the album's development for Território da Música.

Pitty's first professional venture into music began in 1998 when she became the vocalist for Inkoma, a hardcore punk band formed in Salvador, Bahia. The band earned her underground recognition in her hometown, particularly after releasing a demo in 1998 that sold 15,000 copies. They also released a single, "Soneto", with a music video inspired by poet Gregório de Matos, and their debut EP, Influir, in 2000 via the independent label Tamborete Entertainment. However, the group disbanded in 2001. Pitty later reflected: "It happened because everyone wanted to do different things—it felt natural. We never officially declared the end; it just faded".

Afterward, Pitty focused on her studies, enrolling in the music program at the Federal University of Bahia for two semesters. During this period, she continued writing songs without plans to record them. Producer Rafael Ramos whom she had met in 1998 through the same music circuit as Inkoma expressed interest in her work and eventually invited her to record an album under his newly founded label, Deckdisc. Pitty recounted to Folha de S.Paulo: "After the band split, I kept making music. I didn't know why, but I kept writing with just voice and guitar, recording on a handheld recorder. One day, Rafael called and asked for the tape. I sent it as a joke it was rough and poorly recorded. But he liked it and invited me to make the album".

For the recording sessions, Pitty moved alone to a Rio de Janeiro apartment rented by the label. Dissatisfied with local musicians, she recruited fellow Salvador natives Joe (drums), Peu Sousa (guitar), and Duda Machado (bass). In an interview with Vice, she explained: "I'd tried Rio musicians but thought: 'Guys, no, this band has to be the people from Salvador, it's weird, it's strange.' " To TPM magazine, she described forming the band: "I hesitated to bring Duda because I worried our [then] relationship would complicate things. But the deadline hit, and I said, 'Let's go!' Joe and Peu joined, and we thought, 'Record first, figure it out later.' We debated if it was a band. I wanted it, but didn't know if they'd stay—so we just named it Pitty". The album also features guest contributions: cellist Jaques Morelembaum on "Temporal" and bassist Liminha on "Equalize". Pitty wrote all 11 tracks alone except for "Equalize". Recording took place at Tambor Studio between 2002 and 2003.

== Title and cover ==
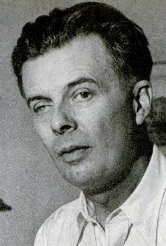
For the album's title and concept, Pitty drew inspiration from the book Brave New World by Aldous Huxley (pictured).

To name the album, Pitty drew inspiration from Brave New World, a science fiction novel by British author Aldous Huxley, originally published in 1932. The book's title in Portuguese is Admirável Mundo Novo. The singer wanted the title to reflect the book's concept, which depicts a 25th-century society devoid of critical awareness of reality. Academic Carolina Quarteu Rivera of the Federal University of Paraíba noted that the album's title, its title track, and its overarching themes unify the work, addressing "the manipulation and alienation of modern humans, programmed by an operating system as if we were robots. In this sense, the musical work invites reflection on how our supposed freedoms- liberty, autonomy of will, free expression—actually render us mere 'puppets' within a capitalist-controlled system". In an interview with MTV Brasil, Pitty elaborated on this influence: "It's a book I adore. I've always loved reading, and while composing the album, this work was very present in my daily life. I had just reread it and watched Fight Club (1999)- a film that deeply impacted me with its themes of human robotization, standardization, and societal rules-which influenced my songwriting".

Under the art direction of João Augusto, the album's photos were taken by fashion photographer Christian Gaul. The cover features a close-up of Pitty's face on the left side, her expression frozen in a state of alertness and mechanized dread. The artist's name appears in central-placed, purple-tinged blue lettering, nearly underlined by the album's title, which is rendered in a scrambled, graffiti-like style with black ink resembling blood or machine oil. This visual metaphor aligns with Pitty's hypnotic gaze, framed by thick nylon strands resembling barbed wire. Danyllo Ferreira Leite Basso, in his article for São Paulo State University, observed that these wires symbolize "the microscopic chains of power that constrain us, creating an illusion of freedom within digital imprisonment". Basso also noted that the metallic blue and gray hues "reference the mechanization of individuals, evoking the coldness of dehumanized, distant, and collapsing relationships—both between people and with the world".

== Musical style ==
"There's no deliberate goal to convey a message. These are personal observations, critiques, and feelings that people end up relating to. Many, like me, live in perplexity, questioning the chaos around us. Maybe that's why it resonates with others' emotions."

— Pitty on the album's lyrical content.

Musically, Admirável Chip Novo is a hard rock and alternative rock album incorporating elements of nu metal, punk rock, and grunge. Lyrically, the album critiques humanity's role in society, superficial modern values, and the yearning for spiritual freedom. Pitty acknowledged this in an interview with Correio: "I didn't plan a rigid concept, but these themes naturally emerged. I'm troubled by today's superficiality, fueled by urban urgency". Only one track, "Equalize", explores romantic love. Pitty explained: "I'm romantic, but I struggle to articulate love lyrically. Others do it so well—I'd rather focus on other topics".

"Teto de Vidro" ("Glass Ceiling") opens the album, addressing hypocrisy through a biblical allusion to "casting stones". Its frenetic rhythm features guitar solos, driving drum beats, and raw vocals. The title track, "Admirável Chip Novo" ("Brave New Chip"), critiques consumerism and societal conditioning, likening humans to robots. The chorus "Pense, fale, compre, beba / Leia, vote, não se esqueça / Use, seja, ouça, diga / Tenha, more, gaste, viva / Não sinhô, sim sinhô" ("Think, speak, buy, drink / Read, vote, don't forget / Use, be, hear, say / Have, live, spend, exist / No, sir / Yes, sir")—satirizes blind obedience.

"Máscara" ("Mask") tackles societal façades, while "Equalize" is the album's sole ballad, romanticizing love through metaphors of art and music. "O Lobo" ("The Wolf") juxtaposes humans with wolves, critiquing self-destructive behavior. "Emboscada" ("Ambush") explores betrayal, and "Do Mesmo Lado" ("On the Same Side") uses heavy instrumentation to reflect on shared manipulation.

"Temporal" ("Storm"), the gentlest track, reflects on fleeting relationships with acoustic guitars and cello. "Só de Passagem" ("Just Passing Through") advocates minimalism amid heavy riffs, while "I Wanna Be" critiques societal pretense with English-language lines. The album closes with "Semana que Vem" ("Next Week"), urging listeners to act without delay.

== Reception ==
=== Critical reception ===
Professional ratings
Review scores
| Source | Rating |
|---|---|
| CliqueMusic | 2/5 stars |
| Folha de S.Paulo | 3/5 stars |
| O Globo | Positive |
| Tribuna da Imprensa | 2/4 stars |

Admirável Chip Novo received mostly mixed reviews from music critics. For Folha de S.Paulo, Jean Canuto rated the album three out of five stars. He noted that Pitty did not disappoint in her solo debut, blending "sonically heavy tracks with expert lyrics" and "experimental pieces with string arrangements and acoustic guitars", elements he felt Brazilian rock at the time "lacked". Bruno Porto of O Globo recommended the album to readers, stating that while Pitty did not explore her shouted vocals or Inkoma's punk sound, she delivered vigorous rock in a "well-produced album" that reaffirmed her artistic identity. Similarly, Fabiana Bártholo of MTV Brasil remarked that the album's "aura suggests someone with attitude, a rock and roll lover eager to deliver substance to her audience". Rafael Fracacio of Let's Rock! described the album as "a massive rock explosion heavy sound, consistent tracks, precise vocals, and lyrics full of poetry and depth", declaring it "on par with any work in the genre" and "essential for fans of poetry, reflection, and real rock".

In a less enthusiastic review, Tatiana Tavares of Tribuna da Imprensa awarded the album two out of four stars. While praising Pitty's vocals, she criticized its inconsistency, calling it a "girl's album" that avoids "romantic pop nonsense or the bitter tone of American female rockers". She noted its "aggressive, guitar-driven" tracks like "Máscara" but found "O Lobo" overly pretentious. Tavares concluded that debut albums "often aim in multiple directions", and while Admirável Chip Novo had flaws, it signaled "a promising career start". Marco Antonio Barbosa of CliqueMusic also gave two out of five stars, applauding Pitty's vocals and compositions but criticizing the album's "overambitious" dystopian concept, which he deemed "naive". He felt producer Rafael Ramos' "polished, radio-friendly" approach diluted the band's raw edge. Despite these issues, Barbosa acknowledged the album's "diversity, solid songwriting, and quality performances", though he argued it "didn't change the game".

=== Accolades ===
At the 5th Annual Latin Grammy Awards, Admirável Chip Novo was nominated for Best Brazilian Rock Album but lost to Skank's Cosmotron. At the 9th MTV Video Music Brasil in 2003, Pitty received two nominations: Best New Artist and Viewers' Choice, though she did not win. At the 2004 ceremony, she won Video Music Brasil awards for Best Rock Video ("Equalize") and Viewers' Choice. "Semana que Vem" won Best Video at the Multishow Brazilian Music Award, while "Equalize" was nominated for Best Song. "Semana que Vem" also won Best National Video at the Meus Prêmios Nick, and "Equalize" received the Troféu Rádio Rock for Best National Song.

=== Commercial performance ===
Admirável Chip Novo became a sensation in Brazilian rock, ending 2003 as the genre's best-selling album. It earned a platinum certification in Brazil for sales exceeding 250,000 copies. By October 2005, digital sales on iMusica reached 2,942 downloads at R$1.99 each.

== Promotion ==
=== Singles ===
"Máscara" was released on 21 March 2003 as the lead single from Admirável Chip Novo. Initially, Deckdisc doubted its commercial potential, as Pitty revealed: "[The label said] 'Máscara'? Are you crazy? It's almost five minutes long, partly in English, with a wall of guitars in the chorus. It won't get airplay anywhere.' But my intuition said it had to be this one, and it was". The music video, directed by Maurício Eça, features Pitty and her band performing in a warehouse while judges in black robes evaluate them. Meanwhile, a man dressed as a pai de santo displays "rarities" in a cage, including twin angels and an elderly man dressed as a woman. The video became Pitty's first to air on MTV Brasil's Disk MTV, where it became a hit. The song was also featured as the theme for the character Shao Lin (Leonardo Miggiorin) in the Rede Globo telenovela Senhora do Destino.

"Admirável Chip Novo" was released as the second single on 5 August. Directed by Eça, the video premiered on MTV Brasil's Pulso MTV on 28 July. It depicts Pitty in a studio, observed by a director and a viewer who ultimately shuts off the television, ending the scene. On 21 November, "Teto de Vidro" was released as the third single. Its video, also directed by Eça, shows Pitty singing in a studio crisscrossed by infrared beams, waiting to strike if she steps out of line. The song was featured in the soundtrack of the 11th season of the Brazilian series Malhação.

"Equalize" was released as the fourth single on 28 April 2004. Directed by Caíto Ortiz and Doca Corbett, the video premiered on Pulso MTV on 28 July. It features Pitty alone in a house, performing various activities, including using the bathroom with the door open. During the chorus, she twirls in a large skirt, with CGI effects enhancing scenes like falling flower petals and moving books. Pitty revealed: "The first cut included a scene I proposed, simulating female masturbation, which has always been taboo. It was an attempt to show an image that's rarely seen".

"Semana que Vem" was released as the fifth single on 3 November 2004. Directed by Eça, Sérgio Mastrocola, and Pablo Nobel, the video premiered on Pulso MTV on 14 December. It shows Pitty aging gradually as she sings, ending with her as an elderly woman driving a VW Fox. Finally, "I Wanna Be" was released as the sixth single in February 2005. The video, filmed at a São Paulo concert venue, features Pitty and her band performing the song for a large audience.

=== Appearances ===
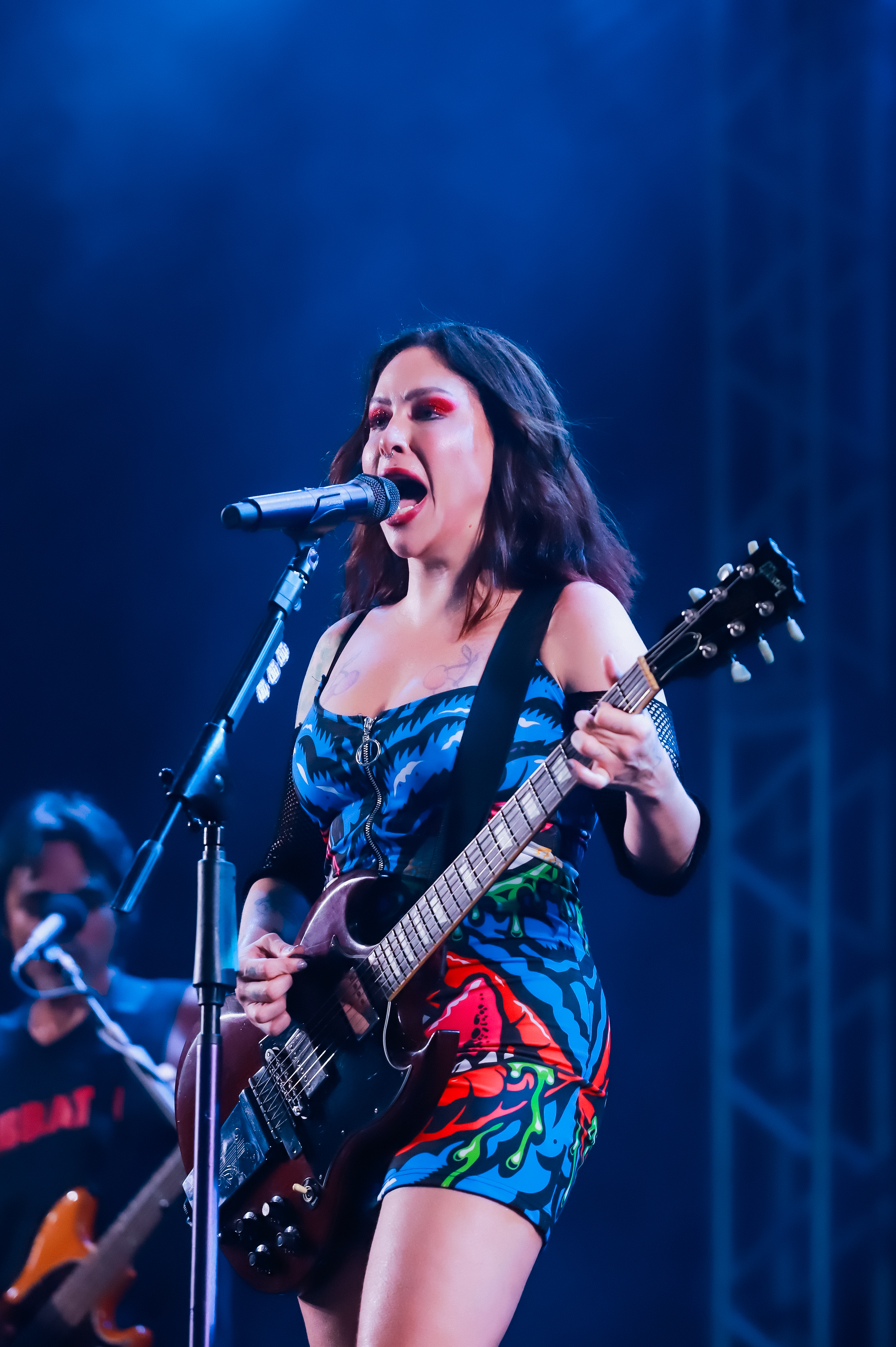
Pitty performing the album's title track during a show in 2024.

The promotion for Admirável Chip Novo began on 3 April 2003, when Pitty performed at a party dedicated to the album's release at the Nacional Club venue in São Paulo. On television, she promoted the album by performing several tracks on Gordo a Go-Go, aired on MTV Brasil on 6 March. On Programa do Jô, aired by Rede Globo, Pitty was interviewed by Jô Soares and performed "Máscara" and "Admirável Chip Novo"; this appearance was later re-aired on the show in February of the following year. In July, she was featured on Pulso MTV — to premiere the music video for "Admirável Chip Novo" — and on Meninas Veneno. In September, she appeared on the Multishow program Ensaio Geral, performing several songs from the album. Host Serginho Groisman welcomed her on his Rede Globo show, Altas Horas, where she performed "Admirável Chip Novo". At the 9th edition of the MTV Video Music Brazil, held on 28 August, Pitty performed "Máscara".

On Neurônio MTV, aired on 24 January 2004, she performed as a musical guest and participated in a competition against the band Capital Inicial. On 11 February, an entire episode of Luau MTV was dedicated to the artist, who was interviewed by Sarah Oliveira and performed several tracks from her repertoire, as well as covers of other artists. Between 17 and 21 May, she starred in Família MTV, where her professional routine was documented for a week. On 2 June, she returned to Gordo a Go-Go to perform and be interviewed by João Gordo. She also performed again on Ensaio Geral on 27 July. TV Cultura aired a second appearance by the singer on Bem Brasil on 11 September. In October, she also appeared on Caldeirão do Huck, on Globo, performing "Admirável Chip Novo" and "Teto de Vidro", as well as a cover of "Girls Just Want to Have Fun" by Cyndi Lauper. The following month, in the final phase of her album's promotion, she performed the two aforementioned songs on Domingão do Faustão, also on Globo.

The promotion of Admirável Chip Novo continued with the Admirável Turnê Nova, which began in April 2003 and toured Brazilian cities. The tour's stop at the Salvador Summer Festival, on 1 February 2004, was attended by over 50,000 people. To celebrate the 20th anniversary of Admirável Chip Novo, Pitty embarked on a second tour dedicated to the album, titled #ACNXX, which began on 1 April 2023. A video album was released as Admirável Vídeo Novo in 2004. In addition to recordings of the tour performances, the album included two documentaries featuring studio and behind-the-scenes conversations, as well as versions of hits performed by her and her band during the tour.

== Legacy and impact ==
"The early 2000s were not the most comfortable scenario for a female artist from the Northeast to break into rock. At the time, axé music was still in its golden era, inherited especially from the [19]90s, and women faced sexual objectification constantly. Yet, Pitty was unafraid to go against the grain and, unknowingly, paved the way."

— Ana Beatriz Gonçalves, from GQ magazine.

Pitty's debut album was highly significant for Brazilian popular culture and the music industry. Various specialized outlets credited it as one of the works that helped shape 21st-century Brazilian rock, noting that its release also served as a foundation for future bands and artists in the genre, introduced rock to a previously untapped audience, and made the artist a household name in the country. According to music journalist Pedro Hollanda, with Admirável Chip Novo, Pitty brought "what was missing in the [music] scene at that time and stood out as one of the few women to achieve great success in [Brazilian] rock". He observed that "even though Charlie Brown Jr. and Planet Hemp had introduced hardcore elements to the mainstream, they still carried influences from rap and hip-hop, with lyrics addressing completely different themes". Similarly, editor Mike Faria noted that the "singer reached, above all, an audience that did not feel represented by the successful bands of the time, which were dominated by male figures". Joel Rocha, from the website Moodgate, considers that "Pitty's authentic attitude opened doors not only for new bands but also for other women, much like Rita Lee did before. She played an important role in breaking gender stereotypes within rock, at a time when most bands were composed of men and misogyny was even stronger in that niche". For Hollanda, the album's success helped revive the presence of women in the mainstream of Brazilian rock, at a time when other representatives of the genre like Rita Lee and Paula Toller were "living off their legacy", and Cássia Eller had "passed away".

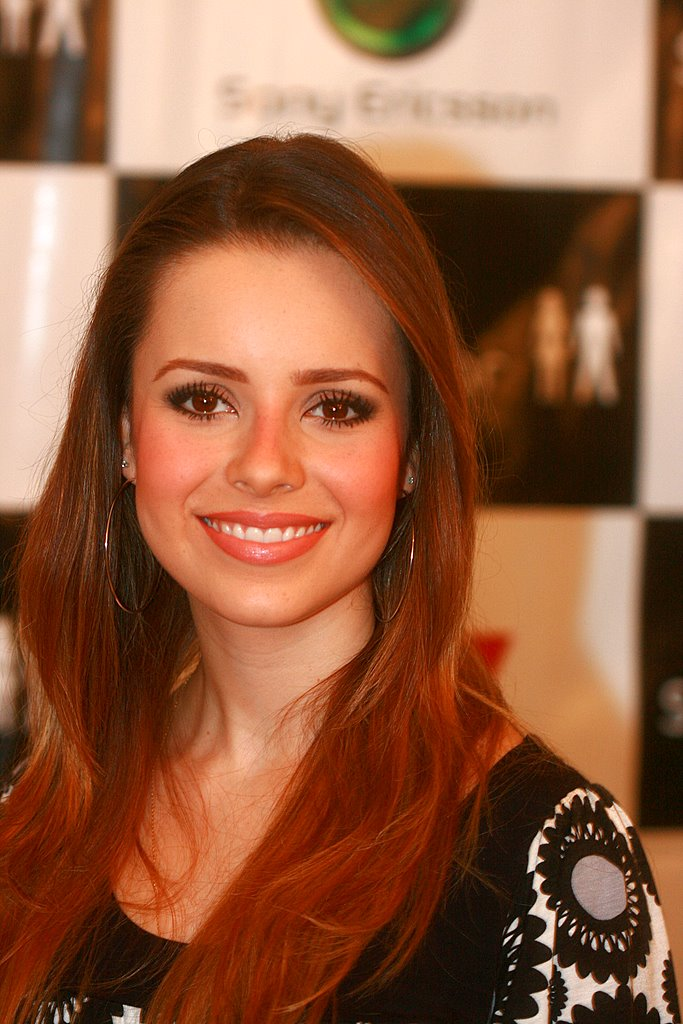
Pitty's rise with Admirável Chip Novo was noted by the media as a counterpoint to the romantic pop music produced by singers like Sandy (pictured) and others who dominated the preferences of teenagers in Brazil during the 2000s.

Pitty's rise represented a counterpoint to the last wave of artists from Bahia who had achieved significant prominence in Brazilian music up to that point, such as exponents of axé music, with her standing out by embracing rock. As a result, the artist was credited with breaking the popular construct of axé as the only musical style produced in the state and opening new doors for artists outside the Centro-Sul region of Brazil to look up to "someone who achieved success without compromising who she was". This opinion was echoed by João Bernardo Caldeira, a critic for Jornal do Brasil, who commented that the artist's emergence "in a time of crisis, with scarce investments from the music industry", "represented a breath of hope for the entire independent and underground scene, which feared not seeing the light at the end of the tunnel. She is living proof that hard work and dedication can still take Brazilian music somewhere. Proof also that it is possible to achieve success across Brazil without leaving behind her indie DNA and roots in Salvador's rock scene. As mainstream as a McDonald's, as wandering as a Michael Moore". The lyrics and sound of Admirável Chip Novo led Beatriz Velloso, from Época magazine, to position Pitty as an alternative in the Brazilian market — particularly for young consumers — to romantic pop singers like Sandy and Wanessa Camargo. In contrast to these artists, who focused on compositions centered around romantic relationships, Pitty encouraged listeners to question social norms and embrace self-acceptance regarding their personality and appearance.

Due to its exploration of such themes, journalist Tácito Chimato stated that the album represented the voice of a generation of young people "angry at the world, who often didn't know how to put into words the revolt they felt, and found in the scene a space of common acceptance for the things they experienced in their early youth". In retrospect, Mari Pacheco, from Popline, felt that the album anticipated topics that serve as analogies to discussions addressed years later, such as cancel culture ("Teto de Vidro") and reclaiming individuality ("Máscara"). Another analysis of the album praised the singer for subverting the notion that "in Brazil, to achieve success, music needs to be easily digestible, and in the case of a woman, her body must be part of the product"; Pitty, in the critic's view, managed to "capture the attention of a youth that was not willing to think but paid attention to the messages in the songs and catapulted her to insane success". The artist's style on the album was also noted for becoming a trend among many young people at the time, with teenagers emulating the clothes and accessories she wore, dyeing their hair, and wearing wristbands and chokers. With 1,606 votes, Admirável Chip Novo was voted the 4th best national album of 2003 by readers of Folha de S.Paulo. Later, editors of the same newspaper listed it as one of the "50 albums that shaped Brazilian musical identity in the 2000s".

== Track listing ==
All tracks are written by Pitty, except "Equalize" (written with Peu Sousa).

| No. | Title | Length |
|---|---|---|
| 1. | "Teto de Vidro (Glass Roof)" | 3:32 |
| 2. | "Admirável Chip Novo (Brave New Chip)" | 3:11 |
| 3. | "Máscara (Mask)" | 4:49 |
| 4. | "Equalize" | 3:52 |
| 5. | "O Lobo (The Wolf)" | 3:38 |
| 6. | "Emboscada (Ambush)" | 3:13 |
| 7. | "Do Mesmo Lado (On the Same Side)" | 5:12 |
| 8. | "Temporal (Rainstorm)" | 4:05 |
| 9. | "Só de Passagem (Just Passing By)" | 2:09 |
| 10. | "I Wanna Be" | 2:32 |
| 11. | "Semana que Vem (Next Week)" | 3:39 |
| Total length: | | 39:21 |

Admirável Vídeo Novo (DVD)
| No. | Title | Length |
|---|---|---|
| 1. | "Do Mesmo Lado (On the Same Side)" (documentary) | 38:18 |
| 2. | "Tem Alguém Lá Fora? (Is There Someone Out There?)" (documentary) | 38:34 |
| 3. | "Máscara (Mask)" (music video) | 4:59 |
| 4. | "Admirável Chip Novo (Brave New Chip)" (music video) | 3:27 |
| 5. | "Teto de Vidro (Glass Roof)" (music video) | 3:47 |
| 6. | "Equalize" (music video) | 4:15 |
| Total length: | | 1:33:20 |

== Personnel ==
Credits adapted from the album liner notes:

- Pitty – vocals
- Peu Sousa – guitar
- Dunga – bass (tracks 1–3, 5–11)
- Liminha – bass (track 4)
- Duda Machado – drums
- Paulinho Moska – acoustic guitar (track 8)
- Luciano Granja – acoustic guitar (track 8)
- Rick Ferreira – acoustic guitar (track 8)
- Sacha Amback – orchestral chimes (track 8)
- Jota Moraes – string arrangements
- Ricardo Amado – violin
- Jaques Morelenbaum – cello

=== Studio production ===
- Rodrigo Vidal – recording and mixing
- Rafael Ramos – music production
- Pitty, Duda Machado – pre-production
- João Augusto – art direction
- Jorge Guerreiro – recording and mixing assistance
- Tatiana Horácio – production assistance
- Ricardo Garcia – mastering
- Christian Gaul – photography
- Mate Lelo – graphic design and project

== Bibliography ==
- Basso, Danyllo Ferreira Leite (2012). Admirável Chip Novo: O En-Un(C) I-Ato Cultural Responsivo, Responsável e Ético De Pitty (PDF) (Thesis) (in Portuguese). São Paulo: Universidade Estadual Paulista. p. 12.
- Vita, Egberto Guillermo Lima (2009). O admirável mundo novo de Pitty: a crise de identidade do homem contemporâneo na virada do século (PDF) (Thesis) (in Portuguese). Campina Grande: Universidade Estadual da Paraíba. p. 13. ISSN 2176-5901.
- Rivera, Carolina Quarteu (2017). Admirável mundo novo, Admirável gado novo e Admirável chip novo: da literatura inglesa ao manifesto musical brasileiro (PDF) (Thesis) (in Portuguese). Campina Grande: Universidade Estadual da Paraíba. p. 3.
