= Love Never Fails (Kathie Lee Gifford song) =

Single by Kathie Lee Gifford

Single by Kathie Lee Gifford

from the album The Heart of a Woman
- Released: October 2000
- Recorded: 2000
- Genre: Pop
- Length: 3:54
- Label: Universal
- Songwriters: Johnny Mosegaard Pederson, Karlsten Dahlgaard, Julie Morrison, Jane Vaughn

"Love Never Fails" is a pop song written by Johnny Mosegaard Pederson, Karlsten Dahlgaard, Julie Morrison and Jane Vaughn. Versions have been released by the American singer-songwriter Kathie Lee Gifford as the lead single for her 2000 album The Heart of a Woman, and by the Brazilian pop duo Sandy & Junior as the lead single for S&J Internacional.

== Kathie Lee Gifford version ==
=== Critical reception ===
Peter Fawthrop from AllMusic wrote: "[It] is heavily reminiscent of Celine Dion's 'That's The Way It Is' but with such a glorious hook, you do not care where its inspiration came from – you want to hear it again, and fast."

=== Track listing ===
US Promo CD Single
No.	Title	Length
1.	"Love Never Fails"	3:54

== Sandy and Junior version ==
"Love Never Fails"

Single by Sandy & Junior

from the album Sandy & Junior Internacional
- Released: June, 2002
- Recorded: 2001–2002
- Genre: Pop
- Length: 3:36
- Label: Universal Music
- Songwriters: Johnny Mosegaard Pederson, Karlsten Dahlgaard, Julie Morrison, Jane Vaughn
- Producers: Jam & Delgado

Sandy & Junior singles chronology
"Quando Você Passa" (2001)	"Love Never Fails" (2002)	"Words Are Not Enough" (2002)

Alternative cover
- Remixes LP/CD Cover

"Love Never Fails" was covered by the Brazilian pop duo Sandy & Junior and released as the lead single for Sandy & Junior (in Brazil, Sandy & Júnior Internacional), their twelfth studio album. The single was released worldwide in June 2002, as their first attempt to reach international markets. Sandy & Junior recorded the song in four different languages (English, Spanish, French, and Portuguese), and music videos to each version were commissioned.

=== Background ===
"Love Never Fails", as well as the whole Sandy & Junior album, was recorded in Los Angeles. The lyrics were adapted to three languages: Spanish, Portuguese, and French, as "El Amor No Fallará", "O Amor Nos Guiará", and "L'Amour… Ce Remede" respectively.

The Spanish lyrics were written by Nacho Mañó and the Portuguese lyrics were adapted by Sandy herself along with the Brazilian songwriter Dudu Falcão. The French version was written by Boris Bergman and recorded in Paris along with "Le Pire Des Mots", the French version of "Words Are Not Enough". When asked about recording the song in French, Sandy said, "I've never spoken French (…) I've had a one-hour class to learn this song, and another hour to learn the song that I'm still going to record."

About the meaning of the song, Sandy & Junior said in an interview, "This song, 'Love Never Fails', could be about a boyfriend or a girlfriend, but we sing this song to our Mom and Dad."

=== Release ===
"Love Never Fails" was released worldwide on June 21, 2002, as the first single for Sandy & Junior's international career. The duo stated in a press conference, "We thought that 'Love Never Fails' would best introduce us to the world. It's pop, but it has that Brazilian flavour."

The English version was sent to radio stations in Germany, Switzerland, Austria, Italy, Costa Rica, Thailand and Israel, while Venezuela, Colombia, Spain, Argentina, Chile and Portugal received "El Amor No Fallará", the Spanish version. Although there is a Portuguese version, Brazilian radio stations played the English version.

Additionally, a "Spanglish version", mixing both English and Spanish, was available in some international releases.

=== Commercial performance ===
The single was sent to radio stations worldwide. "Love Never Fails" had a moderate success in Brazil. Its Portuguese version (O Amor nos Guiará) reach No. 2 in Portugal, and the Spanish version (El Amor no Fallará) reach No. 15 in Spain.

=== Track listings ===
Brazilian Promo CD Single
No.	Title	Length
1.	"Love Never Fails"	3:36
2.	"Love Never Fails (Spanish Fly Remix) (Radio Version)"	3:03

International CDM Promo
No.	Title	Length
1.	"Love Never Fails"	3:36
2.	"O Amor Nos Guiará"	3:39
3.	"El Amor No Fallará"	3:36
4.	"Love Never Fails (Spanglish)"	3:36

Australia Maxi-Single
No.	Title	Length
1.	"Love Never Fails"	3:36
2.	"Love Never Fails (Spanglish Version)"	3:36
3.	"Love Never Fails (Spanish Fly Remix) (Radio Version)"	3:04
4.	"Não Dá Pra Não Pensar"	3:54
5.	"Love Never Fails (Video) (Enhanced Track)"	3:40

UK Promo CD-R (The Almighty Remixes)
No.	Title	Length
1.	"Love Never Fails (Almighty Mix)"	7:52
2.	"Love Never Fails (Almighty 12" Dub)"	6:28
3.	"El Amor No Fallará (Almighty Mix)"	7:48
4.	"Love Never Fails (Almighty Instrumental)"	7:45

UK double promo (CD/12" vinyl)

CD/LP 1
No.	Title	Length
1.	"Love Never Fails (Spanish Fly Club Mix)"	6:05
2.	"Love Never Fails (Spanish Fly Radio Mix)"	3:05
3.	"Love Never Fails (Almighty Dub)"	6:25
4.	"Love Never Fails (Full Phatt Remix)"	3:24

CD/LP 2
No.	Title	Length
1.	"El Amor No Fallará (Spanish Fly Club Mix)"	6:05
2.	"El Amor No Fallará (Spanish Fly Radio Mix)"	3:05
3.	"El Amor No Fallará (Almighty Dub)"	6:25
4.	"El Amor No Fallará (Full Phatt Remix)"	3:24

USA 12" Vinyl Single (Club Remixes)
No.	Title	Length
1.	"El Amor No Fallará (Spanish Fly Club Mix)"	6:05
2.	"El Amor No Fallará (Spanish Fly Radio Mix)"	3:03
3.	"Love Never Fails (Almighty Dub)"	6:25
4.	"Love Never Fails (Full Phatt Remix)"	3:23
