= Peu Sousa =

Brazilian musician and record producer (1977–2013)

- Born: Pedro Sérgio dos Santos Maia de Sousa; July 22, 1977; Salvador, Bahia, Brazil
- Died: May 5, 2013 (aged 35) Salvador, Bahia, Brazil
- Genres: Rock
- Occupations: Musician, songwriter, record producer
- Instrument: Electric guitar
- Years active: 1995–2013

Pedro Sérgio dos Santos Maia de Sousa (July 22, 1977 – May 5, 2013), simply known as Peu Sousa, was a Brazilian guitarist, songwriter and record producer best known for his work with singer Pitty.

== Early life ==
Peu Sousa was born in Salvador, Bahia on July 22, 1977, and was the stepson of Novos Baianos member Luiz Galvão.

== Career ==
Sousa began his career in 1995 with the band Dois Sapos e Meio, which lasted until 1999, and later served as a live musician during performances of Carlinhos Brown and his stepfather. In 2003 he was invited by singer Pitty to be part of her live band; he stayed for one year, during which he was the guitarist of her debut Admirável Chip Novo and co-wrote the track "Déjà-Vu" off her 2005 album Anacrônico.

In 2005 he formed the band Trêmula, which was nominated for a MTV Video Music Brazil award. His final music project was the short-lived Nove Mil Anjos, alongside Junior Lima, Champignon and Perí Carpigiani.

== Personal life and death ==
Sousa began to struggle with depression during his final years. On May 5, 2013, he and his wife had a falling-out after which she left their home in Itapoã with their two children; upon returning, she found Sousa hanging from their bedroom ceiling with a belt around his neck. The police ruled his death as a suicide. Sousa's brother Lahiri Galvão, however, claimed in an interview that he found it "very unlikely" that Peu was driven to suicide merely because of the argument he'd had with his wife, while his former Nove Mil Anjos bandmate Champignon (who himself committed suicide four months after Sousa) stated that "for a while, Peu had lost his faith in life". Junior Lima and Pitty subsequently made statements on the guitarist's passing and offered condolences.
