= Tô Ligado em Você =

Studio album by Sandy & Junior
- Released: February 8, 1993
- Genre: Children's music; pop
- Length: 36:42
- Language: Portuguese
- Label: Philips; PolyGram
- Producer: Xororó

Sandy & Junior chronology
Sábado à Noite (1992)	Tô Ligado em Você (1993)	Pra Dançar Com Você (1992)

Singles from Tô Ligado Em Você
- 1. "Tô Ligado Em Você" Released: February 8, 1993; 2. "Primeiro Amor" Released: May 13, 1993; 3. "Splish Splash" Released: October 22, 1993

Tô Ligado em Você (transl. I'm Hooked On You) is the third studio album by Brazilian music duo Sandy & Junior. It was first released by Philips and PolyGram in 1992. Unlike the first two albums, where country music was the main influence, the genres explored in this album are rhythms and styles of the 1950s, as well as pop music and ballads. In an interview with IstoÉ newspaper, Sandy said that the first albums had a country influence because of their father, Xororó (from the duo Chitãozinho & Xororó), but that later she and Junior made their own choices.

For the release of the album, Sandy and Junior appeared on television programs with the same look as on the cover of the album, inspired by the 1950s and the film Grease (which, in turn, was the inspiration for Sandy's name). "Tô Ligado Em Você", one of the album's tracks, is a version of one of the Grease song "You're The One That I Want".

The track "Primeiro Amor" is a version of the song "First Love", which was popular due to a recording by singer Nikka Costa. In addition to a substantial number of TV appearances and a national tour, a special feature was shown on Rede Manchete, where almost all of the tracks on the album were performed. They were also interviewed by Jô Soares on the late night show Jô Soares Onze e Meia, where they performed "Splish, Splash" live. Tô Ligado em Você was certified gold by Pro-Música Brasil.

== Track listing ==
All songs produced by Rick Bonadio
No.	Title	Writer(s)	Length
1.	"Splish, Splash" (Splish Splash)	Bobby Darin; Jenn Murray; Erasmo Carlos	2:31
2.	"Primeiro Amor" (First Love)	Teddy Randazzo; Roger Joyce; Kassiano; Rocky	3:25
3.	"Tô Ligado em Você" (You're the One That I Want)	John Farrar; Feio; Xororó; Noely	2:40
4.	"Eu Quero Voar"	Alessandro; Feio; Noely	4:08
5.	"Capitão Sujeira"	Feio; Elias Costa; Xororó	2:40
6.	"Como é Bom Gostar" (Islands in the Stream)	Barry Gibb; Robin Gibb; Maurice Gibb; Feio; Dena	4:19
7.	"Ciumeira"	Waldir Luz; Greyce; Xororó	3:02
8.	"Não Somos Números" (I Numeri)	Lorenzo Cherubini; Massimo Gabutti; Xororó; Noely	3:43
9.	"Coça-Coça"	Paulo Simões; Guilherme Rondon	3:10
10.	"Casa Assombrada"	Joel Marques; Fátima Leão	3:10
11.	"Coitadinho do Jacaré"	Elias Muniz; Carlos Colla	3:25
Total length:			36:42

== Certifications and sales ==
Region	Certification	Certified units/sales
Brazil (Pro-Música Brasil)	Gold	450,000
