= Anacrônico =

Studio album by Pitty
- Released: August 21, 2005
- Recorded: 2005
- Genre: Hard rock; alternative rock; alternative metal
- Length: 46:38
- Language: Portuguese
- Label: Deckdisc
- Producer: Rafael Ramos

Pitty chronology
| Admirável Chip Novo (2003) | Anacrônico (2005) | Chiaroscuro (2009) |

Singles from Anacrônico
- 1. "Anacrônico" Released: 2005; 2. "Memórias" Released: 2006; 3. "Déjà-Vu" Released: 2006; 4. "Na sua Estante" Released: 2006

Professional ratings
Review scores
| Source | Rating |
|---|---|
| Allmusic | 4/5 stars |

Anacrônico (Portuguese: [ɐnaˈkɾoniku]; Anachronistic) is the second album by Brazilian rock singer Pitty. It was released on August 21, 2005 by Deckdisc.

The album also has a DualDisc version. It has the music video "Anacrônico", the photo gallery of their respective eponymous album and a documentary regarding the recording.

In the documentary "Sessões Anacrônicas" (Anachronistic Sessions), we can check the recording sessions for the CD, conducted by producer Rafael Ramos. In this we can notice the relaxation and the band, the satisfaction that the CD is being made of uncompromising fashion (Pitty even says that the success of the first CD did not press somehow). Call attention the work of Bahia on vocals, especially on the track "A Saideira" and in doideiras that happened in the studio.

== Track listing ==
| No. | Title | Writer(s) | Length |
|---|---|---|---|
| 1. | "A Saideira (One for the Road)" | Pitty | 2:51 |
| 2. | "Anacrônico (Anachronistic)" | Pitty, Graco | 3:12 |
| 3. | "De Você (From You)" | Pitty | 3:48 |
| 4. | "Memórias (Memories)" | Pitty | 3:34 |
| 5. | "Déjà-Vu" | Pitty, Peu Sousa | 4:18 |
| 6. | "Aahhh...!" | Pitty | 1:08 |
| 7. | "Ignorin'u" | Pitty | 4:19 |
| 8. | "Brinquedo Torto (Twisted Toy)" | Pitty | 4:59 |
| 9. | "Na Sua Estante (On Your Shelf)" | Pitty | 3:42 |
| 10. | "No Escuro (In the Dark)" | Pitty | 3:07 |
| 11. | "Quem Vai Queimar? (Who's Gonna Burn?)" | Pitty | 4:02 |
| 12. | "Guerreiros São Guerreiros (Warriors Are Warriors)" | Pitty | 4:46 |
| 13. | "Querer Depois (To Want It Later)" | Pitty | 2:46 |
| Total length: | | | 46:38 |

DualDisc version
| No. | Title | Length |
|---|---|---|
| 14. | "Anacrônico (Music video)" | 4:00 |
| 15. | "Sessões Anacrônicas (Documentary)" | 1:20:12 |
| 16. | "Seu Mestre Mandou (Photo gallery)" | 3:07 |

== Personnel ==
- Pitty – lead and backing vocals, guitar (3, 8), piano (3, 12, 13)
- Martin Mendonça – acoustic and electric guitars
- Joe Gomes – bass guitar
- Duda Machado – drums

Production

- Rafael Ramos – production
- Rodrigo Vidal – recording, mixing
- Brian Gardner – mastering
- Fernando Fischgold, Fábio Roberto, Igor Ferreira, Jorge Guerreiro, Leo Shogun – recording assistants

== Certifications ==
Certifications for "Anacrônico"
| Region | Certification | Certified units/sales |
|---|---|---|
| Brazil (Pro-Música Brasil) | Gold | 50,000^{‡} |
^{‡} Sales+streaming figures based on certification alone.
