= Você é D+ =

Studio album by Sandy & Junior
- Released: 1995
- Genres: Pop; Children's music
- Length: 36:57
- Language: Portuguese
- Label: Mercury/PolyGram
- Producer: Xororó

Sandy & Junior chronology
Pra Dançar Com Você (1994)	Você é D+ (1995)	Dig-Dig-Joy (1996)

Singles from Você é D+
- 1. "O Universo Precisa de Vocês (Power Rangers)" Released: 1995; 2. "Vai Ter Que Rebolar" Released: 1995; 3. "Sonho Real" Released: 1995

Você é D+ (transl. You're awesome!) is the fifth album by the Brazilian music duo Sandy & Junior. It was produced by their father, notable Brazilian singer Xororó, from the duo Chitãozinho & Xororó. It was released by PolyGram in 1995. The singer and presenter Xuxa participated singing in the first song of the album, "Rap do Aniversário" (transl. Birthday Rap).

As in many early Sandy & Junior albums, many songs were versions of international songs recorded in Portuguese, like "Sonho Real", which is a version of "(I've Had) The Time of My Life", from the movie Dirty Dancing (1987). The title song itself is a version of "Love so Right", from Bee Gees. Also, "Hopelessly Devoted To You", was sung originally by Olivia Newton-John, and "Doce como Mel", was originally "Sugar Baby Love", by The Rubettes.

The Song "O Universo Precisa de Vocês (Power Rangers)" (transl. The Universe Needs You (Power Rangers)) was one of the most successful in the album, paying a homage to the first seasons of the series Power Rangers, which was a big success in Brazil at the time. Another hit was "Vai Ter Que Rebolar", the only song from the album that carried on being sung by the duo into their adult years.

== Track listing ==
No.	Title	Writer(s)	Length
1.	"Rap do Aniversário (with Xuxa)"	Fafy Siqueira; Sarah Benchimol	3:27
2.	"Além da Imaginação"	Dalton Rieffel; Dalmo Belote	3:34
3.	"Sonho Real (I've Had the Time of My Life)"	F. Previte; J. DeNicola; D. Markowitz; Xororó; Noely; Feio	4:42
4.	"Roller Boys"	Lucas Robles; César Rossini	4:03
5.	"A Gente Se Gosta Demais"	Xororó; Feio	3:09
6.	"Marilyn"	Xororó; Noely; Joel Marques	3:09
7.	"Vamos Ver a Galera Agitar"	Feio; Xororó; Fátima Leão	3:12
8.	"O Universo Precisa de Vocês (Power Rangers)"	Renato Ladeira; Roberto Lly	2:55
9.	"Você é Demais (Love so Right)"	Barry Gibb; Robin Gibb; Maurice Gibb; Edgard Poças	3:59
10.	"Vai Ter Que Rebolar"	Nenéo	3:29
11.	"É Cedo Pra Amar Assim (Hopelessly Devoted to You)"	John Farrar; Xororó; Noely; Feio	3:01
12.	"Vamos Nessa Que Tá Bom À Beça"	Nino; Maria da Paz	3:47
13.	"Doce Como o Mel"	The Rubettes; Wayne Bickerton; Tony Waddington; Xororó; Noely; Feio	3:13
14.	"Tintim (Um Brinde ao Amor)"	Paulinho Camargo; Gilberto Santos	3:34
Total length:			36:57
