= Martin Mendonça =

Brazilian singer and guitarist (born 1976)

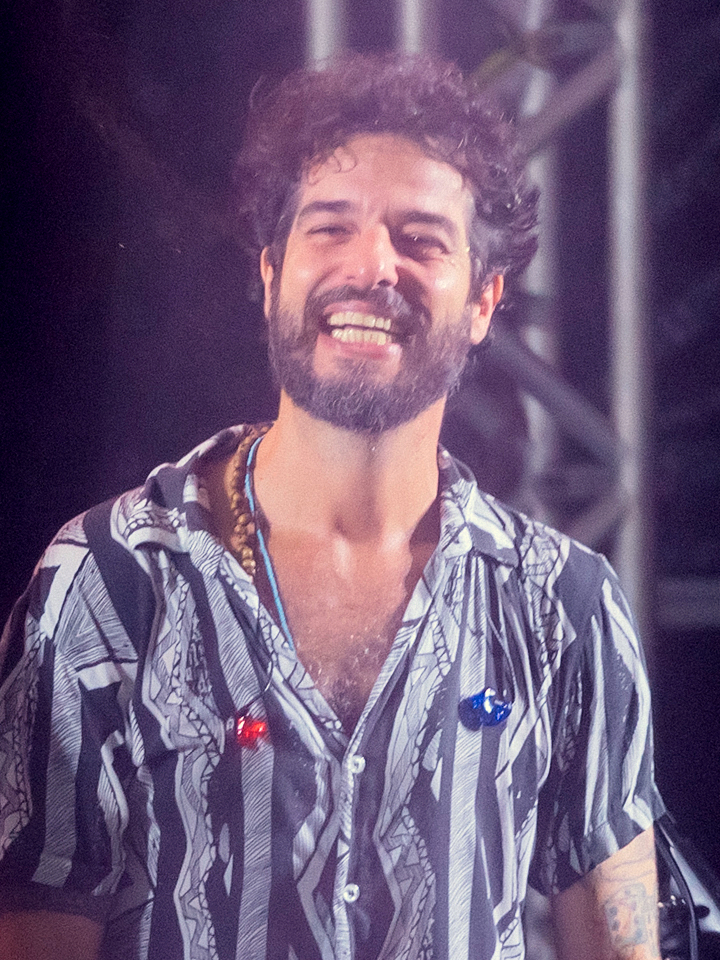
- Mendonça in 2024

Background information
- Birth name: Martin Andrade de Mendonça
- Also known as: Martin; Martã
- Born: 3 June 1976 (age 48); Salvador, Bahia
- Genres: Alternative metal; alternative rock; melodic hardcore; hard rock; soft rock; folk music
- Occupations: singer; musician; guitarist; singer-songwriter

Martin Andrade de Mendonça (born 3 June 1976, Salvador, Bahia) is a Brazilian singer, musician and guitarist. He became known for playing alongside singer Pitty and also in the side project Agridoce.

== Career ==
Mendonça began playing acoustic guitar and started playing electric guitar between the ages of 16 and 17.

He played in the Bahian band Cascadura and with which he moved, in 2003, to the city of São Paulo in order to try to have a career on a national level, but the members' attempts failed, taking the guitarist back to Salvador, Bahia. In December 2004, Mendonça was invited to play with Pitty and returned to São Paulo in 2005.

=== Solo career and other projects ===
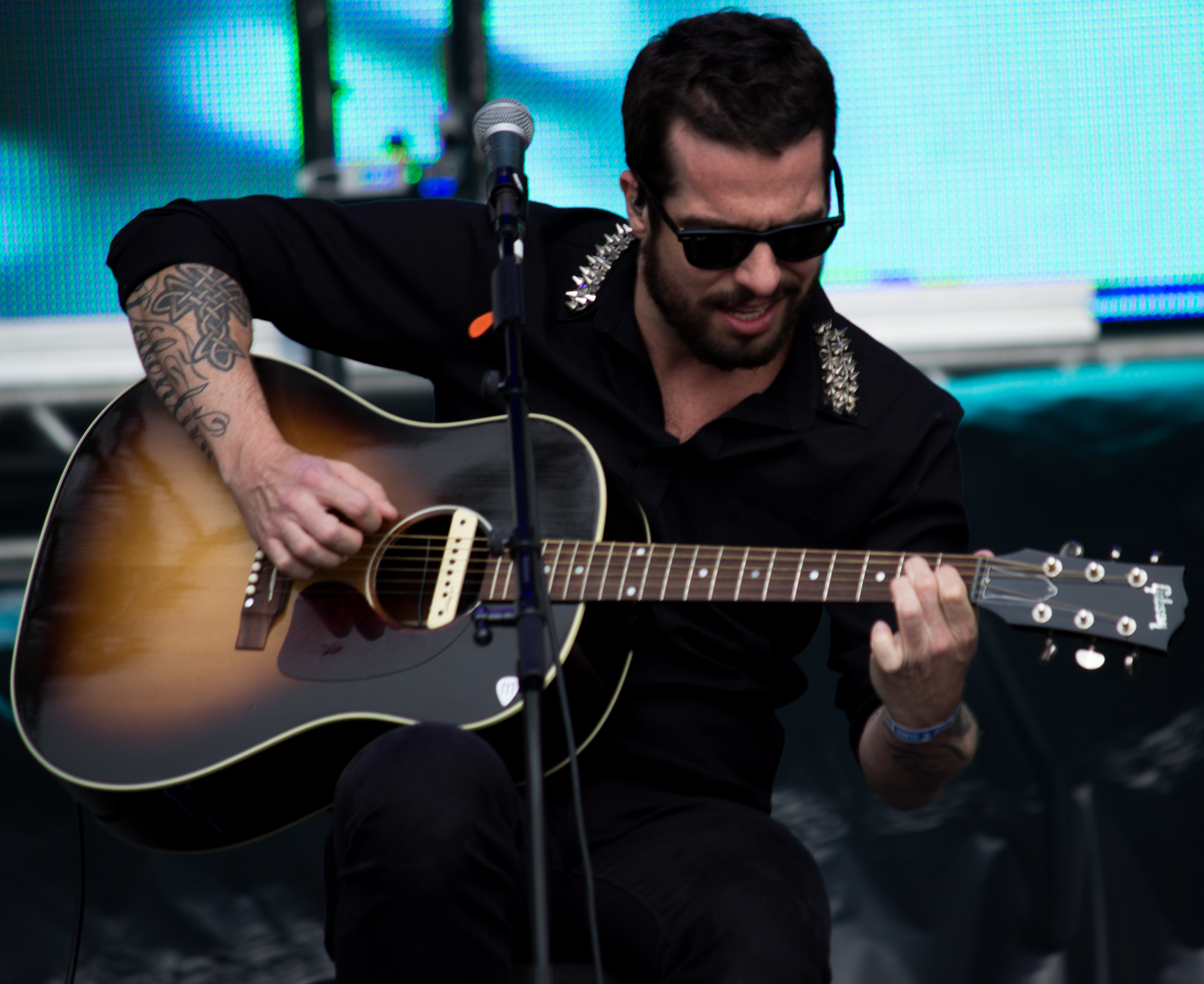
Lollapalooza Brazil (2013)

In 2010, Mendonça released the album Dezenove Vezes Amor in partnership with drummer Duda Machado. They play nine songs, including “Passa em Volta”, “Daqui pra Frente” and “Me Perdi”.

After a decade of accompanying Pitty in her band guitarist Mendonça – with whom Pitty also created the Agridoce project – announced the release of his first solo album. The musician, who in 2010 released the album Dezenove Vezes Amor in partnership with drummer Duda Machado, was finally going to present his own work. The album was called Quando Um Não Quer... and was only released in digital format.

The work was out on Deckdisc and featured nine tracks, most of which are original. The only exception is "Coisas Boas", the first track on the album to be made available, which was written by Fábio Cascadura and Ricardo Alves. The second single was made available on February 12, 2015, the song "Mesmo", featuring Lira and Pitty.

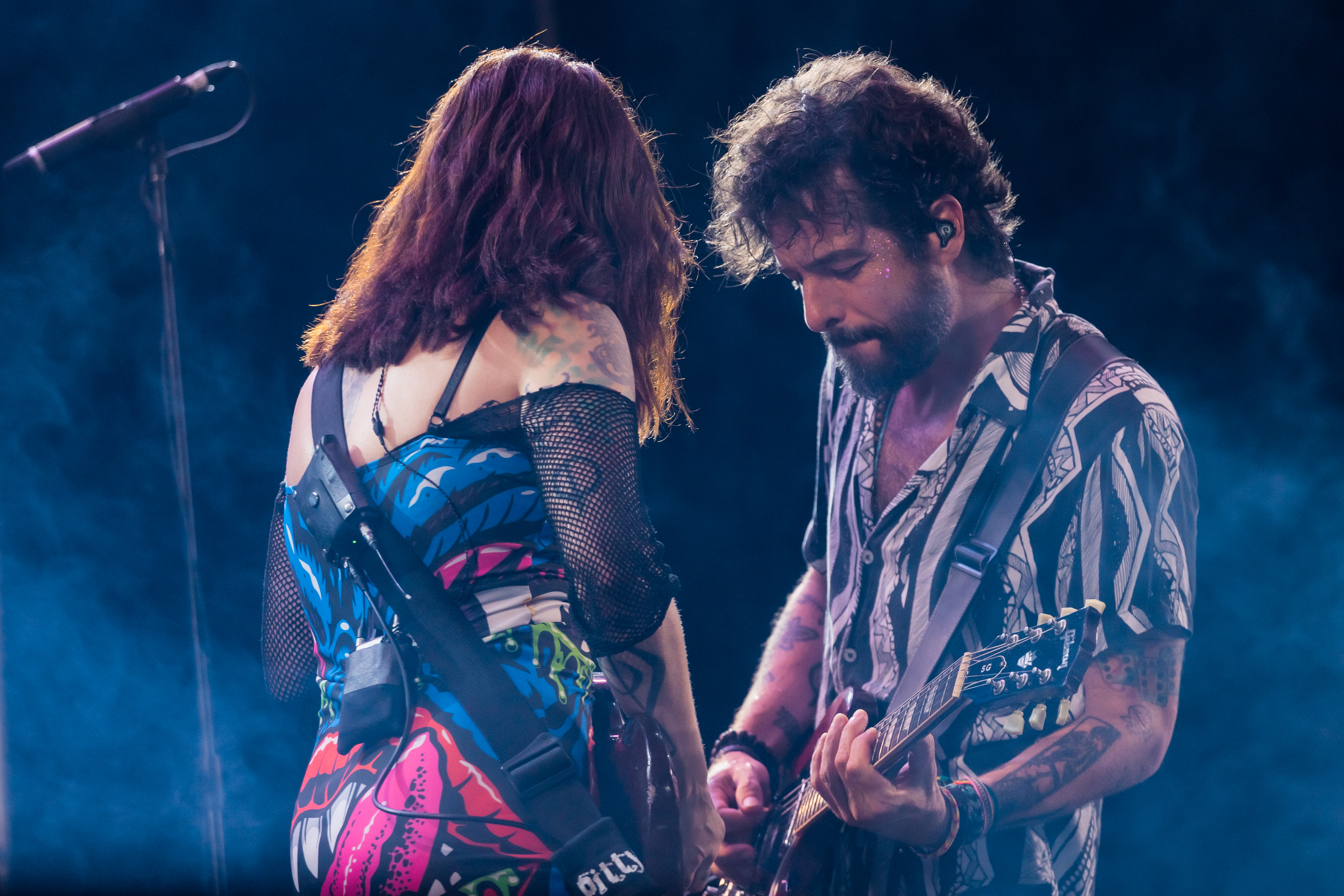
With Pitty in the Carnival of Olinda (2024)

After the release of the album, Mendonça travelled around Brazil with the show Quando Um Não Quer Acústico accompanied by Guilherme Almeida. The concert was a reinterpretation of his songs in a more intimate format. The setlist included songs from the new album, songs from Dezenove Vezes Amor, some partnerships and songs that influenced him.

In 2020, Mendonça teamed up with Gui Almeida and Paulo Kishimoto to record the entirely instrumental album Martin, Kishi & Gui, Vol. 1. The work was all recorded remotely, with the musicians producing their parts in their own home studios. Mendonça (guitar), Almeida (bass) and Kishimoto (keyboards) brought their ideas and each recorded three of the nine tracks, making it varied and with a little of each artist's influences and inspirations.

== Personal life ==
Mendonça was born in Salvador, Bahia and moved to São Paulo City in 2005, when he became Pitty's official guitarist.

Mendonça is the father of Tomaz and Valentina as a result of his long-term relationship with Juana Diniz.

== Discography ==
Solo

- Quando Um Não Quer... (2015)

With Martin & Eduardo

- Dezenove Vezes Amor (2010)

With Agridoce

- Agridoce (2011)
- Agridoce E.P. (2012)

With Pitty

- Anacrônico (2005)
- Chiaroscuro (2009)
- Setevidas (2014)
- Matriz (2019)
