= Sonho Azul =

Studio album by Sandy & Junior
- Released: 1997
- Genres: Pop; Teen Pop
- Length: 36:57
- Language: Portuguese
- Label: PolyGram
- Producer: Xororó

Sandy & Junior chronology
Dig-Dig-Joy (1996)	Sonho Azul (1997)	Era Uma Vez... Ao Vivo (1998)

Singles from Sonho Azul
- 1. "Beijo É Bom" Released: 1997; 2. "Inesquecível" Released: 1997; 3. "Eu Acho que Pirei" Released: 1997; 4. "Era Uma Vez..." Released: 1998

Sonho Azul (transl. Blue Dream). Although in English language being "blue" refers to a sad feeling, in Brazilian culture, blue refers to a good sentiment, and the title track refers to someone dreaming about their loved one. This album consolidated Sandy & Junior as teen idols, selling over 750.000 copies.

The first single released was "Beijo É Bom" (transl. Kissing is Nice). The marketing strategy of the album included the duo participating in the movie O Noviço Rebelde, a parody of the movie The Sound of Music by famed brazilian comedian Renato Aragão. In the movie, Sandy & Junior play two siblings that dream about becoming singers. During the movie, they sing several songs, including a music video of "Beijo É Bom" at Water Park in Fortaleza.

The second single, "Inesquecível" (transl. Unforgettable), was a version of Laura Pausini's "Incancellabile", and got a music video. The third single, "Eu Acho Que Pirei" (transl. I think I Flipped Out), named the tour that followed the album, which also became their first live record. The instrumental section of the song also became the intro of the duo's TV series aired at TV Globo.

The song "Ilusão" (transl. Illusion) became a fan-favorite, although it was not a single. It was the song chosen by the fans to be included in the duo's last live concert.

Besides "Inesquecível", as in their previous records, the duo sang versions of famous international songs, like "Como Eu Te Amo", originally I Will Always Love You, most famously sung by Whitney Houston. Another one Pot-pourri Bee Gee, a mix of three Bee Gees songs: "Mais Que Uma Sombra" (More Than a Woman (Bee Gees song), "Troque a Pilha" Night Fever and "Esteja no Ar" Stayin' Alive. They also sang a cover of singer and composer Erasmo Carlos, "Pega na Mentira" (transl. Catch the Lie).

In 1998, a new version of the album was released, with a new song: "Era Uma Vez..." (transl. Once Upon a Time...). It was the opening of a soap opera with the same name, and the duo sang with the famous singer and composer Toquinho.

== Track listing ==
No.	Title	Writer(s)	Length
1.	"Beijo É Bom"	Feio; Darci Rossi	3:04
2.	"Como Eu Te Amo (I Will Always Love You)"	Dolly Parton; Rossi; Xororó	4:32
3.	"Little Cowboy"	Patsy Montana; Rossi; Xororó	2:42
4.	"Sonho Azul"	Xororó; Danimar; Carlos Randall	3:48
5.	"Felicidade Como For"	Mauro Ghan; Guto Campos	3:44
6.	"Inesquecível"	Giuseppe Carella; Fabrizio Baldoni; Gino De Stefani; Claudio Rabello	3:43
7.	"Pega na Mentira"	Roberto Carlos; Erasmo Carlos	4:04
8.	"Pot-pourri Bee Gees"	Barry Gibb; Robin Gibb; Maurice Gibb; Rossi	4:07
9.	"Mais Um Tempo Pra Crescer"	Feio; Xororó; Alex	3:20
10.	"Não Abuse de Mim"	Álvaro Socci; Cláudio Matta	3:13
11.	"Ilusão"	Álvaro Socci; Cláudio Matta	4:01
12.	"Eu Acho Que Pirei"	Alex; Lili Maturana; Feio	3:19
13.	"Cê Ta Queimando Meu Filme"	Feio; Xororó; Duó	2:57
14.	"Pomponeta"	Socci; Malta; Feio	3:22
15.	"Era Uma Vez..."	Socci; Malta	3:22
Total length:			36:57

== Certifications and sales ==
Region	Certification	Certified units/sales
Brazil (Pro-Música Brasil)	Platinum	250,000^{*}
^{*} Sales figures based on certification alone.
