= Sábado à Noite =

Studio album by Sandy & Junior
- Released: 1992
- Genres: Children's music; sertanejo
- Length: 36:57
- Language: Portuguese
- Labels: Philips; PolyGram
- Producer: Xororó

Sandy & Junior chronology
Aniversário do Tatu (1991)	Sábado à Noite (1992)	Tô Ligado em Você (1993)

Singles from Sábado à Noite
- 1. "Sábado à Noite" Released: 1991; 2. "Aniversário do Tatu" Released: 1991; 3. "Vamos Construir" Released: 1992

Sábado à Noite (transl. Saturday Night) is the second studio album by Brazilian music duo Sandy & Junior, released by Philips and PolyGram on 1992. The album follows the same musical style as the predecessor: sertanejo and country music. The photos of the album cover and album were made in Nashville, Tennessee, a stronghold of country in the United States. There are also two artists on the album: Ney Matogrosso in "O Vira" and Chitãozinho & Xororó in the song "Vamos Construir". Also part of this album is one of the greatest successes of the pair; "A Resposta da Mariquinha", which became a single and the album's best-known song.

Although sources claim that the album received the gold record, with sales around 310,000 copies, the album received no certification from Pro-Música Brasil (PMB).

== Track listing ==
No.	Title	Writer(s)	Length
1.	"Sábado à Noite" (Down at the Twist and Shout)	Mary Chapin Carpenter; Chitãozinho e Xororó; Joel Marques	3:22
2.	"A Resposta da Mariquinha"	Zé Batuta; Quintíno Elizzeu; Zé do Rancho	3:06
3.	"O Vira" (with Ney Matogrosso)	João Ricardo; Lulli	2:30
4.	"Guardiã dos Animais"	Xororó; Marques	3:57
5.	"O Sítio da Vovó"	Gilson; Carlos Colla	2:33
6.	"O Sabe-Tudo"	Colla; Noely; Marcos Valle	2:30
7.	"Vamos Construir" (Love Can Build a Bridge) (with Chitãozinho & Xororó)	John Barlow; Paul Overstreet; Naomi Judd; Sérgio (Feio); Dena	4:30
8.	"Como Nós Somos Unidos"	Xororó; Noely; Rita Adams	2:16
9.	"Infância Careta"	Xororó; Joel Marques; Fátima Leão	2:18
10.	"Pó pra Tapar Taio"	Xororó; Zé da Praia; Duduca	2:46
11.	"Medo de Crescer"	Xororó; Joel Marques	3:05
12.	"Criança, Vida e Luz" (Papai do Céu)	Fátima Leão; Zezé di Camargo	2:46
Total length:			36:57
