= Pra Dançar Com Você =

Studio album by Sandy & Junior
- Released: July 18, 1994
- Genre: Children's music; teen pop
- Length: 47:17
- Language: Portuguese
- Label: Philips; PolyGram
- Producer: Xororó

Sandy & Junior chronology
Tô Ligado em Você (1993)	Pra Dançar Com Você (1994)	Você é D+ (1995)

Singles from Pra Dançar Com Você
- 1. "Com Você" Released: July 18, 1994; 2. "Eu Quero é Mais" Released: September 9, 1994

Pra Dançar Com Você (transl. To Dance With You) is the fourth studio album by Brazilian duo Sandy & Junior, released by Philips and PolyGram on July 18, 1994. Similar to the previous album, much of the sound of Tô Ligado em Você comes from 60's styles. The duo re-recorded some of the classics of the time, such as "Minha Fama de Mau", "Terror dos Namorados", "Veja Se Me Esquece", "Vem Quente Que Eu Estou Fervendo", "Filme Triste", "Maria Mole" others.

The lead single "Com Você", re-recording the song "I'll Be There" by the group Jackson 5, achieving a lot of success and becoming the oldest song of the pair to always be present in their shows. The album also brings the band's first experience with dance-pop, in the track "Dance, Dance, Dance".

The song "X da Questão" was composed in honor of the presenter Xuxa. The duo sang this song at Xuxa Park in 1994.

The album sold over 500,000 in Brazil.

== Track listing ==
1. Com Você (I'll Be There) - 4:19
2. Ser Criança - 3:29
3. O Pica-Pau - 2:20
4. Pra Dançar Com Você - 3:50
5. Eu Quero é Mais - 2:44
6. Nascemos Pra Cantar (Shambala) - 3:05
7. Dance, Dance, Dance - 3:37
8. Pout-Pourri I - 3:44
  - Devolva-Me
  - Veja Se Me Esquece
  - Vem Quente Que Eu Estou Fervendo
9. Filme Triste (Sad movies {Make Me Cry}) - 3:17
10. Maria Mole - 4:04
11. Pout-Pourri II - 3:22
  - Minha Fama de Mau
  - Terror dos Namorados
  - O Bom
12. Pinguilim - 2:34
13. Criança Esperança - 3:45
14. X da Questão - 2:48
