= Chiaroscuro (Pitty album) =

Studio album by Pitty
- Released: August 11, 2009
- Recorded: 2009
- Genres: Hard rock; alternative rock
- Length: 45:07
- Label: Deckdisc

Pitty chronology
Anacrônico (2005)	Chiaroscuro (2009)	Setevidas (2014)

Singles from Chiaroscuro
- 1. "Me Adora" Released: July 14, 2009; 2. "Fracasso" Released: February 8, 2010; 3. "Só Agora " Released: November 3, 2010

Professional ratings
Review scores
Source	Rating
Allmusic	3/5 stars

Chiaroscuro (Portuguese: [kiaɾosˈkuɾu]) is the third album by singer Pitty. After 4 years without releasing a new album, Pitty launched Chiaroscuro on August 11, 2009.

A DVD version of the album, titled Chiaroscope, was released in October 2009. This DVD features videos for all the songs on the album plus three new songs: "Sob o Sol," "Pra Onde Ir," and "Just Now" (the English version of "Só Agora"). This DVD features videos taken during the recording sessions at Madeira Studio, the band's rehearsal space, and was directed and written by Ricardo Spencer. According to the singer, this DVD was inspired by experimental videos typical of the 1960s.

== The name ==
The word comes from Italian, meaning "light and dark" is also one of the innovative techniques used in painting by Leonardo da Vinci, and is characterized by the contrast between light and shadow to represent an object, creating a three-dimensional effect, the name came in the recordings because the songs, which sometimes are more subtle and sensorial, now are more gloomy and dense.

== Artwork ==
To produce the cover of their third album, Pitty decided to draw a panel of the studio, which was designed as they sang. The cover was painted by the illustrator, artist, designer Catherine Gushiken.

== Track listing ==
All songs written by Pitty, except where noted.

No.	Title	Length
1.	"8 ou 80 (Sink or Swim)" (Duda, Joe, Martin, Pitty)	5:36
2.	"Me Adora (Worship Me)"	4:31
3.	"Medo (Fear)"	3:31
4.	"Água Contida (Stopped Water)"	4:26
5.	"Só Agora (Only Now)"	3:18
6.	"Fracasso (Failure)"	3:34
7.	"Desconstruindo Amélia (Deconstructing Amelia)" (Martin, Pitty)	3:56
8.	"Trapézio (Trapeze)"	2:46
9.	"Rato na Roda (Mouse in the Wheel)" (Duda, Joe, Martin, Pitty)	4:49
10.	"A Sombra (The Shadow)" (Martin, Pitty)	4:17
11.	"Todos Estão Mudos (Everyone Is Mute)"	3:35
Total length:		45:07

== Personnel ==
- Pitty - vocals
- Duda Machado - drums
- Joe Gomes - bass
- Martin Mendonça - guitars

Additional musicians

- Hique Gomez - violin on "Água Contida"
- André T - Hammond organ, sampler

Production

- Rafael Ramos - production
- André T - engineering, mixing
- Jorge Guerreiro - mixing assistant
- Bernie Grundman - mastering

Artwork

- Catarina Gushiken - painting
- Rui Mendes - frame photo
- Caroline Bittencourt - band photo
- Rogério Pires - design
