= Era Uma Vez... Ao Vivo =

Live album by Sandy & Junior
- Released: 1998
- Genre: Pop; Teen Pop
- Length: 36:57
- Language: Portuguese
- Label: PolyGram
- Producer: Xororó

Sandy & Junior chronology
Sonho Azul (1997)	Era Uma Vez... Ao Vivo (1998)	As Quatro Estações (1999)

Singles from Era Uma Vez... Ao Vivo
- 1. "Em Cada Sonho" Released: 1998; 2. "No Fundo do Coração" Released: 1998

Era Uma Vez... Ao Vivo is the 8th album and the first live release of Brazilian singing duo Sandy & Junior. It's a recording from the duo's Eu Acho Que Pirei Tour, and it was filmed and recorded in São Paulo. It's their first record to achieve one million copies sold.

To maintain their status as teen idols, most of their older songs were excluded from the final recording, although they were sung during the Eu Acho Que Pirei Tour. There was also a cover of the Titanic's theme, My Heart Will Go On, originally performed by Celine Dion.

Besides the live tracks, three studio tracks were also added. The first Portuguese language version of "My Heart Will Go On", entitled "Em Cada Sonho (O Amor Feito Flecha)" (transl. In Every Dream (Love is Like an Arrow). The second is "Cadê Você Que Não Está", and the third is "No Fundo do Coração", a version of "Truly Madly Deeply", by Savage Garden.

== Track listing ==
No.	Title	Writer(s)	Length
1.	"Como Um Flash (Flashdance... What a Feeling)"	Giorgio Moroder; Irene Cara; Álvaro Socci; Cláudio Matta	5:44
2.	"Com Você"	Berry Gordy; Willie Hutch; Bob West; Xororó; Feio; Noely	4:23
3.	"Beijo É Bom"	Feio; Darci Rossi	3:11
4.	"Inesquecível"	Giuseppe Carella; Fabrizio Baldoni; Gino De Stefani; Claudio Rabello	3:46
5.	"Dig-Dig-Joy"	Feio; Rique Azevedo	3:29
6.	"Vai Ter Que Rebolar"	Nenéo	3:35
7.	"Etc... E Tal (Any Man of Mine)"	Shania Twain; Robert John "Mutt" Lange; Darci Rossi	3:32
8.	"My Heart Will Go On"	James Horner; Will Jennings	4:13
9.	"Era Uma Vez..."	Socci; Malta	3:58
10.	"Não Ter (Non c'è)"	Federico Cavalli; Pietro Cremonesi; Angelo Valsiglio; Claudio Rabello	5:35
11.	"Eu Acho Que Pirei"	Alex; Lili Maturana; Feio	4:20
12.	"Em Cada Sonho (O Amor Feito Flecha) (My Heart Will Go On)"	James Horner; Will Jennings; Feio	4:29
13.	"Cadê Você Que Não Está"	Randall; Danimar; Tivas	3:41
14.	"No Fundo Do Coração (Truly Madly Deeply)"	D. Hayes; Derrick Jones; Paulo Sérgio Valle	3:22
Total length:			36:57

== Certifications and sales ==
Region	Certification	Certified units/sales
Brazil (Pro-Música Brasil)	3× Platinum	750,000^{*}
^{*} Sales figures based on certification alone.
