= Sandy & Junior (2001 album) =

Studio album by Sandy & Junior
- Released: October 8, 2001
- Recorded: Various: Capitol Studios, Los Angeles; Estúdios MM, Campinas
- Genres: Pop rock; dance-pop
- Length: 55:55
- Languages: Portuguese; English
- Label: Universal
- Producer: Moogie Canazio

Sandy & Junior chronology
Quatro Estações O Show (2000)	Sandy & Junior (2001)	Internacional (2002)

Singles from Sandy & Junior
- 1. "O Amor Faz" Released: September 27, 2001; 2. "A Gente Dá Certo" Released: November 19, 2001; 3. "Quando Você Passa (Turu Turu)" Released: January 14, 2002; 4. "Não Dá pra não Pensar" Released: March 17, 2002

Sandy & Junior is the ninth studio album by Brazilian duo Sandy & Junior, released on October 8, 2001. With production of Moogie Canazio and supervision and musical arrangements of Junior, it was recorded between Los Angeles and Campinas studios. The album sold more than 1.5 million copies.

== Background and development ==
After the success of their second live album, Quatro Estações O Show (2000), Sandy & Junior announced in an interview in April 2001 that they would record two albums, one national and one international, and that they would record them in July of the same year. The duo also announced that it would launch the national album in September in Brazil, and the international, in the beginning of 2002. The album would be named 11 (for being the album's 11th album, considering the two albums live previously released), but the name was dropped after the September 11 attacks in New York. "The name was going to be 11, but we did not want people to convey our image with the tragedy that occurred on the 11th, in the United States" argued Sandy. "It's the style of the song, it's pop, and we want to take that style of ours to the international career as well," said Sandy.

== Production ==
Sandy and Junior began selecting material for the album in early 2001, when they also began recording the soap opera Estrela-Guia. Sandy composed four songs, while Junior had participation in the musical arrangements and supervision. The album cost Universal Music 430,000 reais, only in production, not counting the costs of launch marketing and also pressing. The album was recorded in July 2001, between the studios of Capitol Studios in Los Angeles, and MM studios in Campinas, hometown of the pair. The project also featured musicians Tim Pierce, Vinnie Colaiuta and Neil Stubenhaus. Producer of the album, Moogie Canazio commented on the design process of the project saying:

It's very easy to produce such talented people.They're very talented and this makes the work of any producer very easy.What I like most is their professionalism, they always want to collaborate more, they always want to give a little more of themselves.

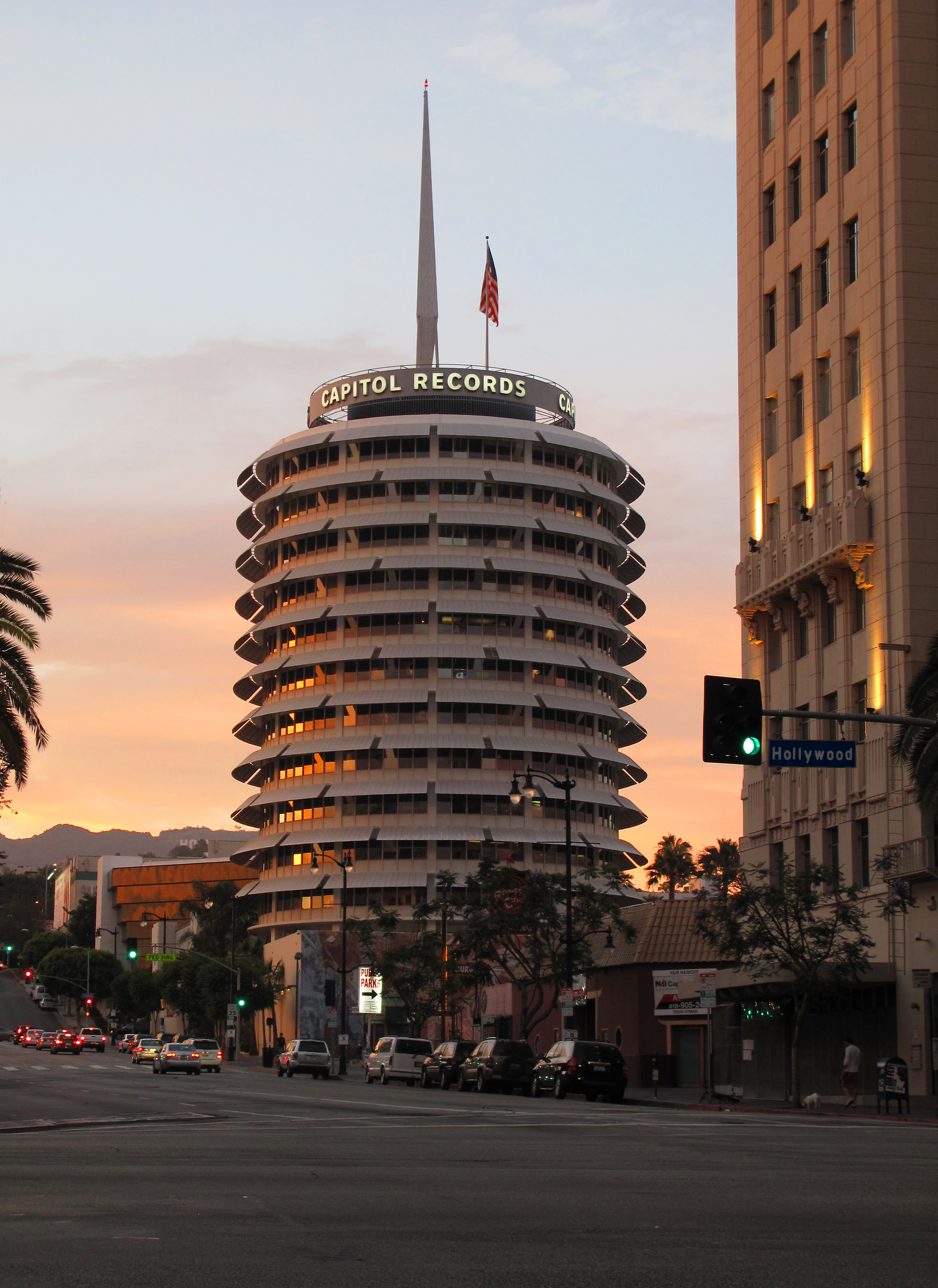
Some of the material was recorded at Capitol Records Studios (photographed) in Los Angeles, California.

For his work on this album, Canazio was nominated for a Latin Grammy in the Best Production Engineering category in the album. The American musical singer Diane Warren delivered to Sandy 6 songs, of which 2 were selected and became Portuguese language versions, composed by Sandy and approved by Warren. "A Estrela Que Mais Brilhar" was created from "Wishing On The Same Star" while "Me Leve Com Você" was created from "Take Me With You (If You Leave)": "She told me, 'I know you're a songwriter, so you're in charge of writing the lyrics in Portuguese,' "Sandy told a news conference.

"Não Dá Pra Não Pensar" is a composition by Sandy and Junior. "Adeus", also composed by the duo, was made in collaboration with Allen C. Lima, from the Lima Family group; Sandy described the track as "a farewell song." "Amor Faz" was released as the flagship of the album and composed by Mauricio Gaetani. One of the best known songs of the project, "Quando Você Passa (Turu Turu)" is a version of an Italian song, translated by Ricardo Moreira, then artistic manager of Universal Music. "Cai a Chuva" and "A Gente Dá Certo" (compositions by musicians Milton Guedes and Paulinho Galvão) present Junior on lead vocals. In "A Gente dá Certo", the siblings sing, "Turn around / turn over / turn over / turn sideways / do not stay out / run in." For Sandy, "People play whatever they want, but the lyrics just remind me of choreography."

There are also the re-recordings "Chuva de Prata" of Gal Costa's and "Endless Love", a duet known in the voices of Lionel Richie and Diana Ross. Including a replay of "Chuva de Prata" was suggested by Max Pierre, vice president of Universal Music at the time. Sandy commented on the rewriting by saying, "We do not pretend to be any better than Gal. We just wanted to present our version." Re-writing "Endless Love" was an old wish of the duo. The actor Rodrigo Santoro makes a special participation in a dialogue with Sandy in the song "Baby, Liga para Mim", also by Milton Guedes. Despite the theme take over from the first to the last song, Sandy does not consider this a romantic album, "It's less romantic than the others, with many songs to dance." "Nada É Por Acaso" was composed by Liah Soares along with Marcio Cruz, Pedro Barezzi and Danimar, while "Deixa Eu Tentar" was written by Otávio de Moraes. The last song is the ballad "O Lugar Perfeito Para o Amor Viver", a composition of Mauro Motta and Dudu Falcão.

== Critical reception ==
Professional ratings
Review scores
Source	Rating
Jornal do Commercio	(positive)

Rosário de Pompéia of Jornal do Commercio, said the album "is the most different of all their albums." She also emphasized that "The professional maturity of the duo is noticeable. In the new work, the siblings' sound gained more dance tones, with romantic lyrics and a predominance of guitar solos." She highlighted the tracks, "Chuva de Prata", "A gente dá Certo" and "Cai a Chuva", as the tracks that should fall into the public's taste.

== Promotion ==
After the release of the album, the siblings made a marathon of disclosure and visited eight Brazilian capitals in just four days to gather the press and talk about the album.

== Singles ==
The first single from the album, "O Amor Faz" was released in late September 27, 2001 and became the only song on the album to have a music video. The song was a hit in the charts of Brazil, reaching the peak of number 3, on November 3, 2001.

The second single, "A Gente Dá Certo", was released on November 19, 2001, but did not count on a music video. The song reached number 36 on December 15, 2001. The third single from the album, "Quando Você Passa", was released on January 14, 2002, and even without having an official music video, song became the album's biggest hit, being a hit on the radio and peaking at No. 2 on the Brazilian charts on March 23, 2002.

== Commercial performance ==
The album came out with an initial draft of 1 million copies, which sold out in just three days, giving the album the diamond disc, received in the program Domingão do Faustão, Rede Globo. However, the album was only certified triple platinum by Pro-Música Brasil (PMB) for more than 750,000 copies sold. According to O Estado de S. Paulo, the album sold 1.5 million copies. The magazine Billboard published a note saying that the album reached the # 5 position among best selling albums on April 28, 2002.

To try to combat piracy, a coupon was added to the booklet for fans to compete for trips to Universal Studios in Orlando. It was the 5th best selling CD of 2001, according to Pro-Música Brasil (PMB).

== Relaunch ==
In 2002, Universal Music released a double CD called "2 by 1", which included Sandy & Junior and As Quatro Estações (1999). The CD does not include the complete booklet of the two releases, only two pages with track credits and some photos used in the CD inserts, which were used on the back and back of the compilation. No unreleased song was added to the tracklist on either album.

== Track listing ==
No.	Title	Writer(s)	Length
1.	"Não Dá pra Não Pensar"	Sandy; Junior	3:53
2.	"O Amor Faz"	Mauricio Gaetani	4:21
3.	"Cai a Chuva / Me Diz" (Tease Me)	Milton Guedes; Paulinho Galvão; J. Taylor; J. Bonner; E. Bonner; L.Willis; S. Dunbar; R. Shakespeare; Version: Milton Guedes	4:15
4.	"Baby, Liga pra Mim"	Milton Guedes; Lu Leal	3:23
5.	"Quando Você Passa" (Turu turu)	Francesco Boccia; Gianfranco Calliendo; Ciro Esposito; Version: Ricardo Moreira	3:41
6.	"Chuva de Prata"	Ed Wilson; Ronaldo Bastos	3:32
7.	"Adeus"	Sandy; Junior Lima; Allen C. Lima	4:19
8.	"A Gente Dá Certo"	Milton Guedes	3:36
9.	"Nada É por Acaso"	Lia Soares; Marcio Cruz; Pedro Barezzi; Danimar	4:16
10.	"A Estrela Que Mais Brilhar" (Wishing on the Same Star)	Diane Warren; Sandy	4:22
11.	"Deixa Eu Tentar"	Otávio de Moraes	3:55
12.	"Endless Love"	Lionel Richie	4:11
13.	"Me Leve Com Você" (Take Me With You (If You Leave))	Dianne Warren; Sandy	4:07
14.	"O Lugar Perfeito Pro Amor Viver"	Mauro Motta; Dudu Falcão	4:00
Total length:			43:57

== Charts ==
=== Year-end charts ===
Chart (2001)	Peak position
Brazilian Albums (Pro-Música Brasil)	5

== Certifications and sales ==
Region	Certification	Certified units/sales
Brazil (Pro-Música Brasil)	3× Platinum	1,500,000
