= Dig-Dig-Joy =

Studio album by Sandy & Junior
- Released: 1996
- Genres: Pop; teen pop
- Length: 36:57
- Language: Portuguese
- Label: PolyGram
- Producer: Xororó

Sandy & Junior chronology
Você é D+ (1994)	Dig-Dig-Joy (1996)	Sonho Azul (1997)

Singles from Dig-Dig-Joy
- 1. "Etc... E Tal" Released: 1996; 2. "Dig Dig Joy" Released: 1996; 3. "Não Ter" Released: 1996; 4. "Férias de Julho" Released: 1996

Dig-Dig-Joy is the sixth album by the Brazilian music duo Sandy & Junior. It marks the singers' transition from childhood to adolescence, with songs that were said to better fit this new stage in their lives. Critics' reactions to the album also noted the duo's graduation from child idols to teenage idols. The album ended up selling over 500 thousand copies, further consolidating their national success and setting them on a path to sold-out stadium concerts, which was soon to follow.

The album's name and title track are said to have come from a game that composer Rick Azevedo knew from when he was a soccer player in the Palmeiras team. Players would gather before the game and play "dig-dig-joy", a game where someone moves and the others have to mimic their actions. It became one of the most successful songs of the duo's career.

In this album, they also continue following the pattern laid out by previous releases, having Portuguese versions of notable international songs. "Não Ter" ("Non c'è"), originally sung by Laura Pausini, "Etc... e Tal" ("Any Man of Mine"), by Shania Twain, "Como um Flash" ("Flashdance... What a Feeling"), from the movie Flashdance and sung by Irene Cara, "Dias e Noites" ("We've Got Tonight"), a duo sung by Kenny Rogers and Sheena Easton, "Jambalaya" ("Jambalaya (On the Bayou)"), by Hank Williams and "Mamãe Não Me Falou" (Mama Never Told Me 'Bout You), by The Moffatts.

== Track listing ==
No.	Title	Writer(s)	Length
1.	"Etc... E Tal (Any Man of Mine)"	Shania Twain; Robert John "Mutt" Lange; Darci Rossi	3:24
2.	"Como um Flash (Flashdance... What a Feeling)"	Giorgio Moroder; Irene Cara; Álvaro Socci; Cláudio Matta	3:42
3.	"Eu Vou te Namorar"	Joel Marques; Maracai; Xororó	3:52
4.	"Golpe Certo"	Mu; Carlos Colla	3:30
5.	"Dias e Noites (We've Got Tonight)"	Bob Seger; Rossi	3:54
6.	"Férias de Julho"	Feio; Reinaldo Barriga	3:05
7.	"Quero Saber"	Paulo Henrique; Lincoln Olivetti	4:04
8.	"Dig Dig Joy"	Feio; Rique Azevedo	3:26
9.	"Não Ter (Non c'è)"	Federico Cavalli; Pietro Cremonesi; Angelo Valsiglio; Claudio Rabello	4:52
10.	"Jambalaya (Jambalaya)"	Hank Williams; Edgard Poças	2:56
11.	"Me Apaixonei"	Carlos Randall; Danimar; Alexandre	3:11
12.	"Mala Sem Alça"	Renato Ladeira; Roberto Lly; Noely	3:19
13.	"Mamãe Não Me Falou (Mama Never Told Me 'Bout You)"	Robert Byrne; Eddie Burton; Tommy Dennis; Rossi	3:02
14.	"Cada Coisa Em Seu Lugar"	Socci; Malta	3:21
Total length:			36:57

== Certifications and sales ==
Region	Certification	Certified units/sales
Brazil (Pro-Música Brasil)	Gold	100,000^{*}
^{*} Sales figures based on certification alone.
