= CliqueMusic =

Brazilian music web portal

- Website type: Music web portal
- Available in: Portuguese
- Country of origin: Brazil
- Creators: Vicente Tardin, Diter Stein and Felipe Vaz
- Website: www.cliquemusic.com.br
- Launched: 18 May 2000
- Current status: Defunct

CliqueMusic was a web portal dedicated to Brazilian music and MPB, launched on 18 May 2000 by journalists Vicente Tardin, Diter Stein, and Felipe Vaz. With a team of specialized journalists led by Tárik de Souza, the site quickly became an essential reference for Brazilian music enthusiasts, offering a wide range of information and exclusive content.

The site offered a broad array of content, including music news, biographies, discographies, interviews, a music database, essays, release reviews, CliqueRadio, and an online store. It stood out for its extensive database, which included 28,000 audio clips, 5,000 registered albums, and 700 biographies organized across 37 music genres. Another key feature was its radio section, streaming curated playlists selected by the site’s creators or guest artists.

== History ==
The idea for CliqueMusic arose from the need to create a comprehensive platform where users could access real-time information about Brazilian music and listen to national artists. Journalist Silvio Essinger explained: "We aimed to create an environment where users could stay informed in real time while also listening to Brazilian music".

Originally, the site was led by critics Tárik de Souza and Diter Stein, with contributions from renowned journalists such as Carlos Calado (contributor to Folha de S.Paulo), Silvio Essinger (formerly of Jornal do Brasil), Tom Cardoso (formerly of O Estado de S. Paulo), Nana Vaz (formerly of Folha de S.Paulo), and Rodrigo Faour (formerly of Tribuna da Imprensa). Researchers Rosa Nepomuceno, Jairo Severiano, and José Ramos Tinhorão also provided support. In August 2001, the team underwent changes, with Marco Antonio Barbosa taking over as editor and the addition of journalists such as Júlio Moura, Mônica Loureiro, and Marcus Marçal.

== Impact ==
With an initial investment of US$1 million from Marcos Montenegro, director of Brazilian Institute of Public Opinion and Statistics (IBOPE), and JCS Business Partners, CliqueMusic became the largest Brazilian music portal ever created. By March 2002, it had registered 2,360 artists. The founders paid off with interest from international e-commerce and information platforms, as well as Brazilian portals.
