= Aniversário do Tatu =

Studio album by Sandy & Junior
- Released: 1991
- Genres: Children's music; sertanejo
- Length: 33:20
- Language: Portuguese
- Labels: Philips; PolyGram
- Producer: Xororó

Sandy & Junior chronology
Aniversário do Tatu (1991)	Sábado à Noite (1992)

Singles from Aniversário do Tatu
- 1. "Aniversário do Tatu" Released: 1991; 2. "Maria Chiquinha" Released: 1991

Aniversário do Tatu (transl. Birthday of the Armadillo) is the debut studio album by Brazilian music duo Sandy & Junior, released by Philips and PolyGram on 1991. The album has a sertanejo-influenced sound and was produced by the father of the duo, the singer Xororó. Its release took place in the TV series Domingão do Faustão, of Rede Globo.

The title of the album refers to a joke with the social relations between the animals of the forest and its themes allude to the harmony of nature and the teachings that the life in the field propitiates. The biggest hits of the album were "Aniversário do Tatu" and "Maria Chiquinha" (a re-reading of the song originally released by Sonia Mamed and Evaldo Gouveia in 1961).

The album was certified gold by the Pro-Música Brasil for sales of over 100,000 copies. According to Época magazine, the album sold 230,000 copies, while Quem magazine claims that the album reached 300,000 copies sold.

== Background and development ==
After winning a national screening at the end of 1989, during a "Maria Chiquinha" performance on the Som Brasil TV series, the brothers were invited by the label PolyGram to sign a three-album contract, which began the professional career of the young duo. Aniversário do Tatu was recorded in 1990 and its sound was influenced by the father of the pair, the sertanejo singer Xororó; he produced the album and also wrote some material for the record; some in tandem with Noely, his wife and mother of the duo.

== Track listing ==
No.	Title	Writer(s)	Length
1.	"Aniversário do Tatu"	Gastão Lamounier; Carlos Colla	3;42
2.	"Casamento Natural" (with Xororó)	Fátima Leão	3:49
3.	"Bicho Preguiça"	Xororó; Cezar Augusto; Cesar Rossini	2:53
4.	"Eu Não Tenho Tamanho"	Xororó; Noely	2:13
5.	"A Horta"	Colla	2:01
6.	"Charada (Mano a Mano)"	Xororó; Noely	2:24
7.	"O Presentinho"	Xororó; Carlos Cezar	4:06
8.	"O Vira-Lata"	Xororó; Sapo	2:45
9.	"Lambamania"	Xororó; Noely	2:34
10.	"Fazenda Chico Bento"	Xororó; Colla	2:50
11.	"Maria Chiquinha"	Geysa Bôscoli; Guilherme Figueiredo	3:50
Total length:			33:20

== Certifications and sales ==
Region	Certification	Certified units/sales
Brazil (Pro-Música Brasil)	Gold	100,000^{*}
^{*} Sales figures based on certification alone.
