= Sandy & Junior =

Brazilian pop duo

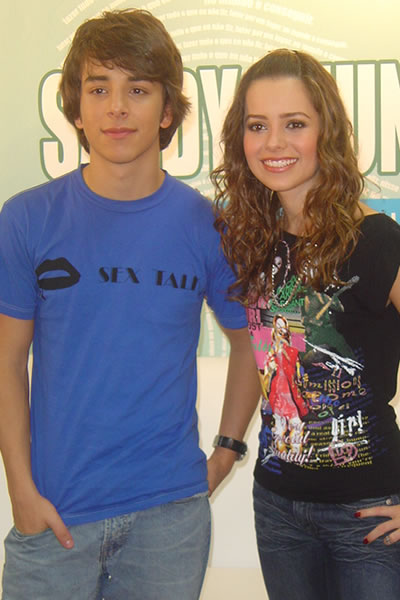
- Sandy and Junior in 2004.

Background information
- Origin: Campinas, São Paulo, Brazil
- Genres: Latin pop; teen pop; pop rock; dance-pop; country
- Years active: 1989–2007; 2019
- Labels: PolyGram; UMG
- Members: Sandy; Junior Lima
- Website: sandyejunior.com.br

Sandy & Junior were a Brazilian pop music duo consisting of siblings Sandy Leah Lima (born January 28, 1983) and Durval de Lima Júnior (born April 11, 1984). They first gained fame as the children of Xororó from popular sertanejo duo Chitãozinho & Xororó. Sandy & Junior began by singing children's songs and sertanejo-influenced tracks (their first single, "Maria Chiquinha", is a classic sertanejo song). Once they reached adolescence, they changed their style to pop-influenced songs, mainly ballads and upbeat songs. They became a pop phenomenon in Brazil with the release of the albums Era Uma Vez... Ao Vivo (1998), As Quatro Estações (1999), Quatro Estações: O Show (2000) and Sandy & Junior (2001), which sold more than 9 million copies together, receiving multiple diamond certificates. Época magazine compared their success to Beatlemania. One of the best-selling Brazilian artists of all time, Sandy & Junior sold over 15 million albums.

They had a self-titled weekly television series between 1999 and 2002 on Rede Globo and released the movie Acquária in 2003; Sandy also starred in the soap opera Estrela-Guia in 2001. Earlier, they had appeared in a Renato Aragão movie, O Noviço Rebelde, in 1997.

On April 17, 2007, through a video posted on their website and a press conference, Sandy & Junior announced that an MTV Unplugged album to be recorded in May 2007 would be their final work together, stating also that their career as a duo would be over at the end of 2007. Both have experienced solo work: Junior as a record producer and Sandy as a solo singer.

In March 2019, they announced the Nossa História tour in celebration of the 30th anniversary of the duo's first televised performance, which took place in 1989. With several dates in stadiums, the tour had several extra dates to accommodate more fans.

== Discography ==
=== Studio albums ===
Title	Details	Sales	Certications
Aniversário do Tatu	Released: 1991; Label: Philips; Format: CD, LP, K7	BRA: 310,000	PMB: Gold
Sábado à Noite	Released: 1992; Label: Philips; Format: CD, LP, K7	BRA: 400,000	
Tô Ligado em Você	Released: 1993; Label: Philips; Format: CD, LP, K7	BRA: 490,000	PMB: Gold
Pra Dançar Com Você	Released: 1994; Label: Philips; Format: CD, LP, K7	BRA: 500,000	
Você é D+	Released: 1995; Label: Mercury/PolyGram; Format: CD, LP, K7	BRA: 550,000	
Dig-Dig-Joy	Released: 1996; Label: Mercury/PolyGram; Format: CD, K7	BRA: 700,000	PMB: Gold
Sonho Azul	Released: 1997; Label: Mercury/PolyGram; Format: CD	BRA: 780,000	PMB: Platinum
As Quatro Estações	Released: 1999; Label: Mercury/Universal Music; Format: CD	BRA: 2,500,000	PMB: 2× Diamond
Sandy & Junior	Released: 2001; Label: Mercury/Universal Music; Format: CD	BRA: 1,000,000	PMB: 3× Platinum
Internacional	Released: 2002; Label: Mercury/Universal Music; Format: CD	BRA: 700,000; POR: 20,000	PMB: Platinum
Identidade	Released: 2003; Label: Mercury/Universal Music; Format: CD, download digital	BRA: 600,000	PMB: Platinum
Sandy & Junior	Released: 2006; Label: Mercury/Universal Music; Format: CD, download digital	BRA: 250,000	PMB: Platinum

=== Live albums ===
Title	Details	Sales	Certications
Era Uma Vez... Ao Vivo	Released: 1998; Label: Universal Music; Format: CD, DVD, VHS	BRA: 1,700,000	PMB: 3× Platinum
Quatro Estações O Show	Released: 2000; Label: Universal Music; Format: CD, DVD, VHS	BRA: 3,000,000	PMB: Diamond
Ao Vivo no Maracanã	Released: 2002; Label: Universal Music; Format: CD, DVD, download digital	BRA: 450,000	PMB: Platinum
Acústico MTV	Released: 2007; Label: Universal Music; Format: CD, DVD, download digital	BRA: 250,000	PMB: Platinum
Nossa História: Ao Vivo em São Paulo	Released: 17 de julho de 2020; Label: Universal Music; Format: CD, DVD, download digital		

=== Compilation albums ===
Title	Details	Sales	Certications
Todas as Estações - Remixes	Released: 2000; Label: Universal Music; Format: CD	BRA: 500,000	PMB: Platinum

=== Singles ===
Year	Single
1991	Maria Chiquinha
1991	Aniversário do Tatu
1991	Casamento Natural
1992	Sábado À Noite
1992	Abra A Porta, Mariquinha
1992	Vamos Construir (With - Chitãozinho & Xororó)
1993	Tô Ligado Em Você
1993	Splish Splash
1993	Primeiro Amor
1994	Com Você
1994	Nascemos Pra Cantar
1994	Criança Esperança
1995	O Universo Precisa de Vocês (Power Rangers)
1995	Rap do Aniversário (With - Xuxa)
1995	Vai Ter Que Rebolar
1996	Não Ter
1996	Dig-Dig-Joy
1996	Etc... E Tal
1996	Férias de Julho
1997	Inesquecível
1997	Beijo É Bom
1997	Eu Acho Que Pirei
1997	Era Uma Vez... (With - Toquinho)
1998	Em Cada Sonho
1998	No Fundo Do Coração
1999	Imortal
1999	Aprender A Amar
1999	As Quatro Estações
2000	You're My #1 (With Enrique Iglesias)
2000	A Lenda
2000	Olha O Que O Amor Me Faz
2000	Enrosca
2001	O Amor Faz
2001	A Gente Dá Certo
2001	Quando Você Passa (Turu Turu)
2002	Love Never Fails
2002	Words Are Not Enough
2002	Convence Al Corazón (Single in Spain, Latin America)
2002	Super-Herói (Não É Fácil)
2002	Nada É Por Acaso
2002	Cai A Chuva
2003	Encanto
2003	Desperdiçou
2003	Você Pra Sempre (Inveja)
2004	Nada Vai Me Sufocar
2006	Replay
2006	Estranho Jeito de Amar
2006	Discutível Perfeição
2006	Tudo Pra Você
2007	Abri Os Olhos
2007	A Lenda (Acoustic)

==== Extra singles ====
Year	Single
1997	"Vivo por Ela" (Sandy Leah With Andrea Bocelli)
1998	"Era uma vez" (With Toquinho)
2000	"You're My Number One" (With Enrique Iglesias)
2003	"Bang Bang (You're The One)"
2004	"Vida De Marola"

== Tours ==
- Tô Ligado em Você (1994)
- Dig Dig Joy (1996—97)
- Eu Acho Que Pirei Tour (1998—99)
- Quatro Estações Tour (2000—01)
- Sandy & Junior 2002 (2002—03)
- Identidade Tour (2004—05)
- Sandy & Junior 2006 (2006—07)
- Acústico MTV (2007)
- Nossa História (2019)

== See also ==
- List of best-selling CDs (Brazil)
- List of best-selling remix albums
- List of best-selling Latin music artists
