= Matriz (album) =

Studio album by Pitty
- Released: April 26, 2019
- Recorded: 2018–19
- Studios: Estúdio Tambor, Estúdios Madeira, Estúdio Vista, Estúdio Casa das Máquinas, Estúdios Family Mob, Garcia Mix Room, Estúdios Rootsans and Sterling Sound Studio
- Length: 44:21
- Language: Portuguese
- Label: Deckdisc
- Producers: Rafael Ramos, Pupilo

Pitty chronology
Setevidas (2014)	Matriz (2019)	Pitty (2026)

Singles from Matriz
- 1. "Noite Inteira" Released: March 20, 2019; 2. "Ninguém É de Ninguém" Released: July 31, 2019; 3. "Para o Grande Amor" Released: December 16, 2019; 4. "Roda" Released: February 18, 2020; 5. "Submersa" Released: May 26, 2020; 6. "Bahia Blues" Released: March 12, 2021; 7. "Motor" Released: March 24, 2021

Matriz is the fifth studio album by Brazilian rock singer Pitty, produced by Rafael Ramos and released on 26 April 2019.

It was preceded by its own tour, "Tour Matriz", initiated in 2018 when the singer was still doing studio work. The second half of the tour started soon after the album's release.

== Concept ==
Pitty explained that the album tells the story of a blueswoman who "departs from the cotton field, puts her viola in the bag and goes to the big city in search of better opportunities. It's a kind of return from an aesthetic and cultural self-exile". She invited Lazzo Matumbi to guest perform on the album because she considers him to be part of "this fundamental Bahia".

== Promotion ==
=== Singles ===
On 20 March 2019, the singer released the song "Noite Inteira" as the first single and with an animated clip directed by Carlos Pedreañez.

On 12 March 2021, Pitty announced the release of "Bahia Blues" as another single from the album. A video to the same track was released on the following day.

On 24 March 2021, she released "Motor" as yet another single and video from the album.

"Te Conecta" was the main single of the album, released on 10 September 2018 with a video. The single was certified gold after reaching 8 million streams, which is equivalent to the sale of around 40 mil copies. The clip was directed by Cisco Vasques and produced by Otavio Augusto, Iara Medeiros and Joanna Jourdan.

== Track listing ==
CD, digital download and streaming
No.	Title	Writer(s)	Length
1.	"Bicho Solto (Note: "Bicho solto" is a Brazilian expression used to qualify a person who makes their own choices and is not restrained by their parents or spouses, for example.)" (Loose Animal; it samples "Noite de Temporal" by Caymmi)	Pitty, Dorival Caymmi	2:47
2.	"Noite Inteira (feat. Lazzo Matumbi)" (Whole Night)	Pitty, Martin Mendonça, Gui Almeida	5:15
3.	"Ninguém é de Ninguém" (Nobody Belongs to Anybody)	Pitty, Daniel Weksler	3:07
4.	"Motor" (Engine)	Teago Oliveira	3:50
5.	"Saudade (Vinheta)" (Longing (jingle); part of a poem.)	Pitty	0:04
6.	"Roda" (Circle (feat. BaianaSystem))	Pitty, Roberto Barreto, Russo Passapusso	3:20
7.	"Azul (Vinheta)" (Blue (jingle) (part of a poem))	Pitty	0:04
8.	"Bahia Blues"	Pitty	3:47
9.	"Te Conecta" (Connects You)	Pitty	3:52
10.	"Redimir" (Redeem)	Pitty	3:36
11.	"Para o Grande Amor" (For the Great Love)	Peu Sousa	3:43
12.	"Submersa" (Submerged)	Pitty	4:06
13.	"Sol Quadrado" (Square Sun (feat. Larissa Luz))	Pitty	5:42
Total length:			44:21

LP

A-side
No.	Title	Writer(s)	Length
1.	"Bicho Solto"	Pitty, Dorival Caymmi	2:47
2.	"Noite Inteira (feat. Lazzo Matumbi)"	Pitty, Martin Mendonça, Gui Almeida	5:15
3.	"Ninguém é de Ninguém"	Pitty, Daniel Weksler	3:07
4.	"Motor"	Teago Oliveira	3:50
5.	"Saudade (Vinheta)"	Pitty	0:04
6.	"Roda (feat. BaianaSystem)"	Pitty, Roberto Barreto, Russo Passapusso	3:20
7.	"Azul (Vinheta)"	Pitty	0:04
Total length:			18:27

B-side
No.	Title	Writer(s)	Length
1.	"Bahia Blues"	Pitty	3:47
2.	"Redimir"	Pitty	3:36
3.	"Para o Grande Amor"	Peu Sousa	3:43
4.	"Submersa"	Pitty	4:06
5.	"Sol Quadrado (feat. Larissa Luz)"	Pitty	5:42
Total length:			20:54

K7

A-side
No.	Title	Writer(s)	Length
1.	"Bicho Solto"	Pitty, Dorival Caymmi	2:47
2.	"Noite Inteira (feat. Lazzo Matumbi)"	Pitty, Martin Mendonça, Gui Almeida	5:15
3.	"Ninguém é de Ninguém"	Pitty, Daniel Weksler	3:07
4.	"Motor"	Teago Oliveira	3:50
5.	"Saudade (Vinheta)"	Pitty	0:04
6.	"Roda (feat. BaianaSystem)"	Pitty, Roberto Barreto, Russo Passapusso	3:20
7.	"Azul (Vinheta)"	Pitty	0:04
8.	"Bahia Blues"	Pitty	3:47
Total length:			20:14

B-side
No.	Title	Writer(s)	Length
1.	"Te Conecta"	Pitty	3:52
2.	"Redimir"	Pitty	3:36
3.	"Para o Grande Amor"	Peu Sousa	3:43
4.	"Submersa"	Pitty	4:06
5.	"Sol Quadrado (feat. Larissa Luz)"	Pitty	5:42
Total length:			19:59

== Critical reception ==
Professional ratings
Review scores
Source	Rating

Silvio Essinger from O Globopraised Pitty and the album's sounds, saying that "even Pitty's ventures into reggae — "Te conecta" and "Sol quadrado" (featuring Larissa Luz) — are built with efficacy and balance and do not distune from the group of tracks of this album with impressive sound profoundness and international-level production."

Paulo Floro from O Grito! magazine said this is Pitty's best album ever, in which she rendezvoused with her African roots. According to him, "Matriz brings Pitty in her best era, very confident, mature and free."

Matriz was elected one of the 25 best Brazilian albums of the first semester of 2019 by the Associação Paulista de Críticos de Arte.

=== Accolades ===
Year	Award	Category	Outcome
2019	Latin Grammy Awards	Best Portuguese Language Rock or Alternative Album	Nominated
2019	WME Awards	Best Album	Nominated

== Personnel ==
- Pitty – lead and backing vocals, piano, mouth percussion and claps
- Martin Mendonça – guitars, acoustic guitar and claps
- Guilherme Almeida – bass
- Daniel Weksler – drums, claps
- Paulo Kishimoto – piano, synthesizer, Hammond, percussion, lap steel and claps
