= Words Are Not Enough (song) =

2001 single by Steps

Single by Steps

from the album Gold: Greatest Hits
- A-side: "I Know Him So Well"
- B-side: "Bittersweet"
- Released: 3 December 2001
- Studio: Metrophonic (London, England)
- Length: 3:23
- Label: Jive; Ebul
- Songwriters: Pelle Nylén; Andreas Carlsson
- Producers: Walter Turbitt; Mark Taylor

Steps singles chronology
"Chain Reaction" (2001)	"Words Are Not Enough" / "I Know Him So Well" (2001)	"Light Up the World" (2012)

Music video
- "Words Are Not Enough" on YouTube

"Words Are Not Enough" is a song by British dance-pop musical group Steps, written by Andreas Carlsson and Pelle Nylén. The track was included on the group's first compilation album, Gold: Greatest Hits (2001), and was released as a double A-side single with a cover of the 1984 song "I Know Him So Well", from the musical Chess (1986).

Released as a single on 3 December 2001, "Words Are Not Enough" / "I Know Him So Well" charted at number five in the United Kingdom and number 21 in Ireland in December 2001 and was the group's last single to be released before their Boxing Day split later the same month. An animated music video was made for "Words Are Not Enough".

== Chart performance ==
The single entered the charts at number five in the United Kingdom but fell out of the top 10 to number 14 the following week, making the song their last top-10 hit. It spent eleven weeks in total in the top 75 despite much lower sales than their previous singles. The sales of this single were only equaled by "Here and Now" / "You'll Be Sorry". It also peaked at number 21 in Ireland and was their last single to chart in that country.

== Music video ==
The video for "Words Are Not Enough" is almost fully animated, apart from a brief appearance from the band at the beginning (filmed at Hedingham Castle in Essex), and didn't feature a dance routine much like the rest of their music videos did. The video begins with the real Claire being sucked into a magic mirror and the rest of the band following her. As they enter the magical world, they transform into computer-animated characters.

== Track listings ==
UK CD single

1. "Words Are Not Enough" – 3:24
2. "I Know Him So Well" – 4:14
3. "Bittersweet" – 3:58
4. "Words Are Not Enough" (video) – 3:24

UK cassette single

1. "Words Are Not Enough" – 3:24
2. "I Know Him So Well" – 4:14
3. "Bittersweet" – 3:58

== Credits and personnel ==
Credits are adapted from the Gold: Greatest Hits album booklet.

Recording

- Recorded at Metrophonic Studios (London, England)
- Mixed at Metrophonic Studios (London, England)
- Mastered at Transfermation (London, England)

Vocals

- Backing vocals – Tracey Ackerman

Personnel

- Songwriting – Pelle Nylén, Andreas Carlsson
- Production – Walter Turbitt, Mark Taylor
- Mixing – Walter Turbitt, Mark Taylor
- Guitars – Adam Phillips

== Charts ==
=== Weekly charts ===
Chart (2001–2002)	Peak position
Europe (Eurochart Hot 100)	27
Ireland (IRMA)	21
Romania (Romanian Top 100)	85
Scotland Singles (OCC)	4
UK Singles (OCC)	5
UK Indie (OCC)	3

=== Year-end charts ===
Chart (2001)	Position
UK Singles (OCC)	135
