= Pitty =

Brazilian singer

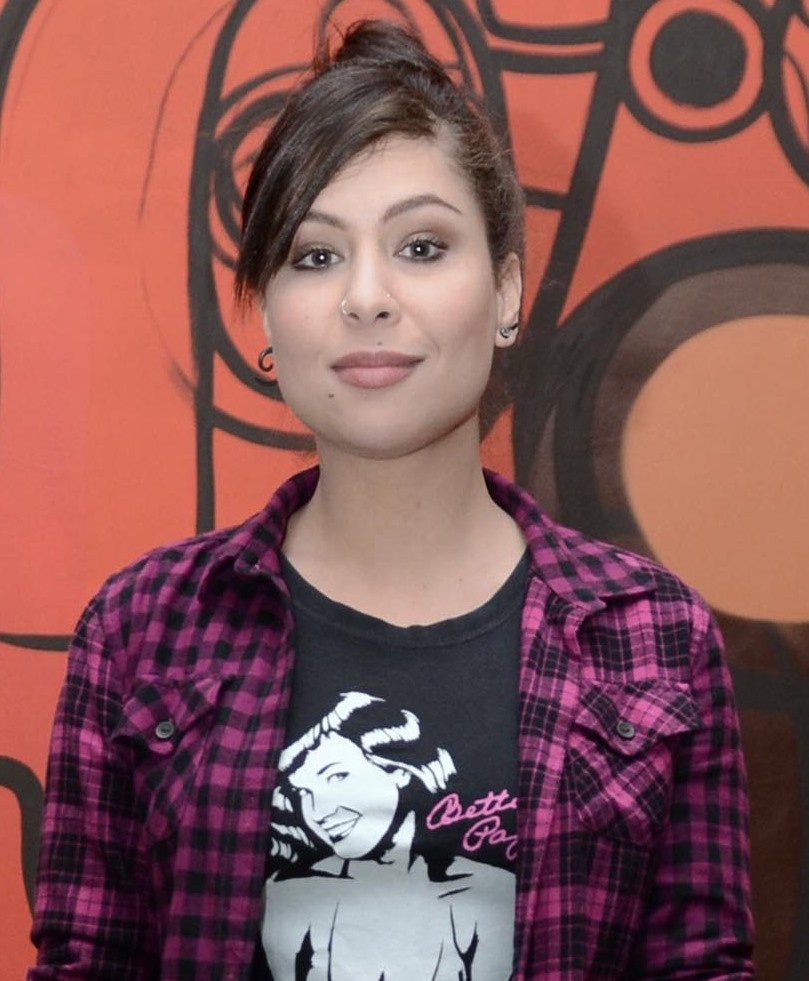
- Pitty in 2011
- Born: Priscilla Novaes Leone; 7 October 1977 (age 49); Salvador, Bahia, Brazil
- Education: Federal University of Bahia
- Occupations: Singer; songwriter
- Years active: 1996–present
- Spouse: Daniel Weksler (m. 2008; div. 2025)
- Children: 1
- Musical career
- Genres: Alternative rock; hard rock; pop rock; folk
- Instruments: Vocals; guitar; acoustic guitar; tambourine; keyboard; bass; piano; drums
- Label: Deckdisc
- Formerly of: Inkoma
- Website: www.pitty.com.br

Signature
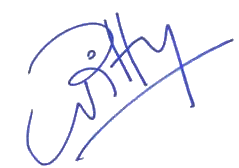

Priscilla Novaes Leone (born October 7, 1977), better known as Pitty, is a Brazilian rock singer.

She had played in two bands, Shes and Inkoma, before starting her solo career in 2003. She has sold over 2 million copies in her career, being one of the best selling rock artists in the 2000s. Pitty was voted the sexiest rock singer of Latin America and Brazil, and the 35th sexiest rock singer in the world in 2010.

Pitty won several awards at the MTV Video Music Brazil, among them Artist of the Year twice, Video of the Year, Best Live Performance, and three times as the lead singer of the Dream Band. Pitty won approximately 51 awards during her seven-year career, setting a record.

In 2011 Pitty appeared on position 14 of Billboard magazines Social 50 chart, the highest debut for a national artist in the chart. She also reached the third position in the magazines Uncharted chart, overcoming Luan Santana and becoming the most influential Brazilian on the Web.

In 2014 Pitty announced that her main band is back, with shows already confirmed by the band's production. So it was announced by the British producer Tim Palmer in social networks, revealing the end of the mix of singles of the new album, which was released in June 2014 in (CD and vinyl). The set includes 10 songs, all unpublished and authored by singer Pitty. "SETEVIDAS" features the production of Rafael Ramos and the mix of Tim Palmer who has produced singles by Pearl Jam, Ozzy Osbourne, The Cure, David Bowie and U2.

== Early life ==
Priscilla Novaes Leone was born on October 7, 1977, in Salvador, Bahia and spent her childhood in Porto Seguro, where her father was a bar guitarist. After her parents separated, she moved with her mother and brother to Salvador when she was 16.

She attended the School of Music Federal University of Bahia.

== Career ==
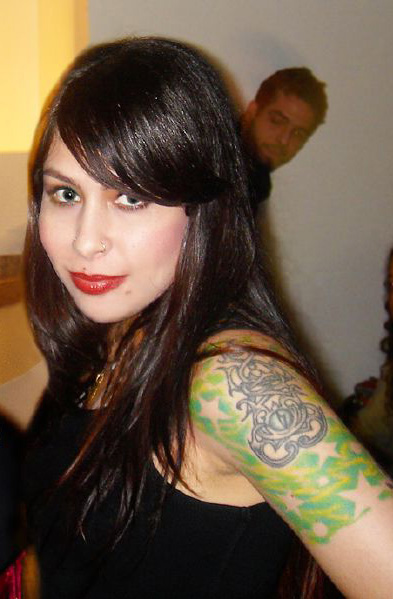
Pitty in 2006

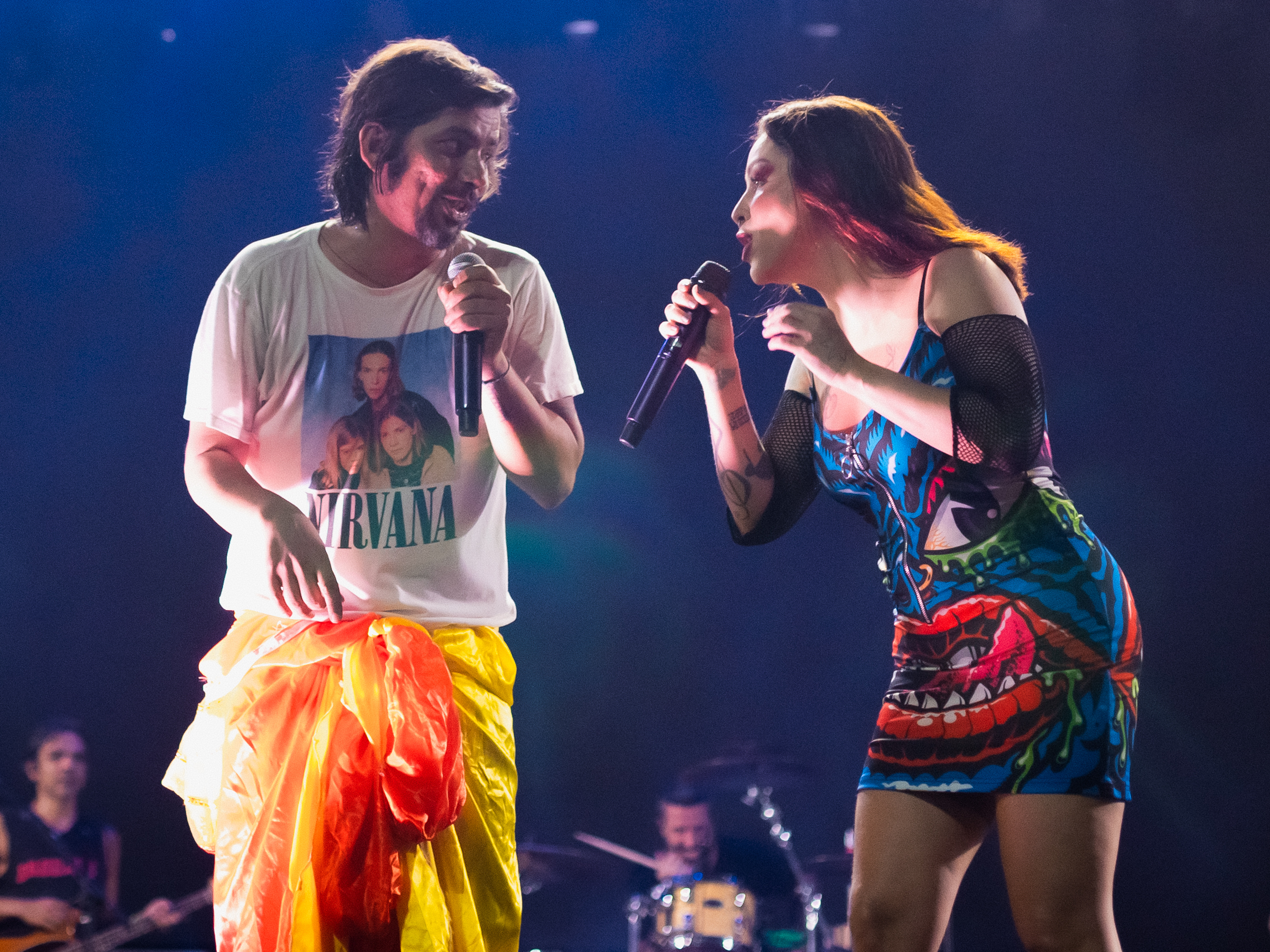
Pitty with Chinaina during the Carnival of Olinda (2024)

Pitty got her start in music amidst the Bahian independent band scene, where she participated in "rodas" or Moshing in bar shows. One day she entered the pit singing "Smells Like Teen Spirit" by Nirvana and from then on decided to invest in her music, with support from Big Brother Roger, owner of the underground bigbross records imprint.

Pitty played drums in the Brazilian band Shes from 1997 to 1999. The band also featured Carol Ribeiro (guitar), Liz Bee (guitar, vocals) and Lulu (bass). From 1995 to 2001 she was the vocalist for the hardcore band Inkoma, which she released several albums with. When Inkoma ended, she was invited by the producer Rafael Ramos to record a solo album.

In 2003, Pitty released her first album, Admiravel Chip Novo, which sold over 820,000 copies, the biggest selling rock album in Brazil in 2003. The singles "Máscara", "Admirável Chip Novo", "Teto de Vidro" and "Equalize" were successful in Brazil and hit number one. The album title was inspired by Aldous Huxley's Brave New World (translated to Portuguese as "Admirável Mundo Novo"). Admiravel Chip Novo was nominated for a Latin Grammy in the category Best Brazilian Rock Album.

In 2005 she released her second album Anacrônico. The album sold over 610,000 copies and was the best-selling rock album in Brazil in 2005.

In 2007, Pitty released their first live album, the {Des}Concerto Ao Vivo. Besides being released on CD, DVD, and DualDisc, the record was also released in a unit cell model, the result of a partnership with Nokia. Thus, Pitty was awarded the "Platinum Mobile" by selling 450 thousand devices containing her album.

In 2009, Pitty released their third studio album, Chiaroscuro. The album's first single, "Me Adora", soon reached the first places in the main Brazilian radio stations. Chiaroscuro won a mobile game that is based on her music, something unprecedented in the country, called Chiaroscuro: The Game.

In 2011, Pitty released her second live album, recorded at Circo Voador, A Trupe Delirante no Circo Voador. The show was recorded in Rio de Janeiro in December, during a performance that featured special guests, in addition to their official band (guitarist Martin, bassist and drummer Joe Duda). The live show featured typical songs and some of his hits during his career, marked by great successes.

A Trupe Delirante No Circo Voador was nominated for a Latin Grammy in the category Best Brazilian Rock Album.

In 2011, Pitty and Martin developed a side project called Agridoce.

In 2014 in the album release week of Setevidas, the singer Pitty was featured with the new CD and entered the top 200 of more than 12 countries: Mexico, United States, Spain, Paraguay, Chile, Argentina, Brazil and others. Being the album with the biggest positive reception of criticism in 2014 by the Brazilian media and the career of singer Pitty. The second single "Serpente" topped the tops of the main Brazilian radio stations and is currently considered the most successful single of the album.

In February 2016, it was announced that the singer, together with the band Os Paralamas do Sucesso and singers Nando Reis and Paula Toller, would take part of a tour promoted by the project Nivea Viva!, which takes place every year and takes artists on Brazilian tours. The series of 7 shows will pay tribute to Brazilian rock.

In 2019, her album Matriz was nominated for the Latin Grammy Award for Best Portuguese Language Rock or Alternative Album.

== Discography ==
=== Studio albums ===
- Admirável Chip Novo (2003)
- Anacrônico (2005)
- Chiaroscuro (2009)
- Setevidas (2014)
- Matriz (2019)
- Pitty (2026)

== Filmography ==
- (2009) É Proibido Fumar (as Mikaela, participation)
