= De 1997 a 2007 =

2007 compilation album by Charlie Brown Jr.

Compilation album by Charlie Brown Jr.
- Released: 2008
- Recorded: 1997–2007
- Genres: Alternative rock, rap rock, skate punk, funk rock, reggae rock
- Label: EMI

Professional ratings
Review scores
Source	Rating
Galeria Musical	link

De 1997 a 2007 (Portuguese for "From 1997 to 2007") is a double-disc compilation album by Brazilian alternative rock band Charlie Brown Jr., released in 2008 through EMI in the wake of the 11th anniversary of the band's debut, Transpiração Contínua Prolongada. It contains a selection of their greatest hits, ranging from Transpiração Contínua Prolongada (1997) to their most recent release at the time, Ritmo, Ritual e Responsa (2007).

Following the death of vocalist Chorão in March 2013, the compilation had a significant posthumous boost on sales; according to the iTunes Store, it was the second most purchased album of the month.

== Critical reception ==
Anderson Nascimento of Galeria Musical gave the compilation a positive rating of 3 out of 5 stars, calling it a "standard compilation recommended strictly for completionists".

== Track listing ==
=== Disc one ===
No.	Title	Original release	Length
1.	"Tudo que Ela Gosta de Escutar"	Transpiração Contínua Prolongada (1997)	2:56
2.	"Proibida pra Mim (Grazon)"	Transpiração Contínua Prolongada (1997)	2:48
3.	"O Côro Vai Comê!"	Transpiração Contínua Prolongada (1997)	2:21
4.	"Não Deixe o Mar te Engolir"	Preço Curto... Prazo Longo (1999)	5:09
5.	"Te Levar"	Preço Curto... Prazo Longo (1999)	3:04
6.	"Confisco"	Preço Curto... Prazo Longo (1999)	3:00
7.	"Zóio de Lula"	Preço Curto... Prazo Longo (1999)	4:12
8.	"Não É Sério" (feat. Negra Li)	Nadando com os Tubarões (2000)	4:50
9.	"Rubão, o Dono do Mundo"	Nadando com os Tubarões (2000)	2:17
10.	"Hoje Eu Acordei Feliz"	Abalando a Sua Fábrica (2001)	2:18
11.	"Lugar ao Sol"	Abalando a Sua Fábrica (2001)	3:32
12.	"Só por uma Noite"	Bocas Ordinárias (2002)	3:23
13.	"Papo Reto (Prazer É Sexo, o Resto É Negócio)"	Bocas Ordinárias (2002)	3:30
14.	"Baader–Meinhof Blues" (Legião Urbana cover)	Bocas Ordinárias (2002)	2:53

=== Disc two ===
No.	Title	Original release	Length
1.	"Não Uso Sapato"	Acústico MTV: Charlie Brown Jr. (2003)	2:55
2.	"Quinta-Feira"	Acústico MTV: Charlie Brown Jr. (2003)	5:19
3.	"Vícios e Virtudes"	Acústico MTV: Charlie Brown Jr. (2003)	3:12
4.	"Champanhe e Água Benta"	Tamo Aí na Atividade (2004)	2:31
5.	"Tamo Aí na Atividade"	Tamo Aí na Atividade (2004)	3:39
6.	"Lutar pelo que É Meu"	Imunidade Musical (2005)	3:20
7.	"Ela Vai Voltar (Todos os Defeitos de uma Mulher Perfeita)"	Imunidade Musical (2005)	3:07
8.	"Senhor do Tempo"	Imunidade Musical (2005)	3:22
9.	"Não Viva em Vão"	Ritmo, Ritual e Responsa (2007)	3:54
10.	"Pontes Indestrutíveis"	Ritmo, Ritual e Responsa (2007)	3:32
11.	"Be Myself"	Ritmo, Ritual e Responsa (2007)	4:33
12.	"O que Ela Gosta É de Barriga"	Ritmo, Ritual e Responsa (2007)	1:51
13.	"Direto e Reto Sempre"	Ritmo, Ritual e Responsa (2007)	2:46
14.	"Uma Criança com Seu Olhar"	Ritmo, Ritual e Responsa (2007)	4:13

== Certifications ==
Certifications for De 1997 a 2007
Region	Certification	Certified units/sales
Brazil (Pro-Música Brasil)	Diamond	500,000^{‡}
^{‡} Sales+streaming figures based on certification alone.
