= Aquele Luxo! =

1999 EP by Charlie Brown Jr.

EP by Charlie Brown Jr.
- Released: 1999
- Studio: Estúdio Midas
- Genres: Alternative rock, rap rock, skate punk, funk rock, reggae rock
- Label: Virgin Records
- Producers: Rick Bonadio, Tadeu Patolla

Aquele Luxo! (Portuguese for "That Luxury!") is a promotional extended play by Brazilian alternative rock band Charlie Brown Jr. Released in 1999 by Virgin Records in a very limited run, it served as a teaser for the band's then-upcoming second studio album, Preço Curto... Prazo Longo.

The photograph used as the EP's cover art was taken in front of a historical house in the city of Brusque, Santa Catarina, which belonged to the family of Aloísio Buss, who would become a long-time friend of vocalist Chorão.

== Track listing ==
All lyrics are written by Chorão; all music is composed by Charlie Brown Jr..

No.	Title	English title	Length
1.	"Aquele Velho Carteado e Algumas Manobrinhas"	That Old Cardplay and Some Little Maneuvers	2:35
2.	"Zóio de Lula"	Squid Eyes	4:12
3.	"Cruzei uma Doida"	I Met a Madwoman	1:45
4.	"União" (feat. Radjja de Santos, De Menos Crime, Homens Crânio and Consciência Humana)	Union	2:59
5.	"Não Deixe o Mar te Engolir"	Don't Let the Sea Swallow You	5:09
6.	"Confisco"	Confiscation	3:00

== Personnel ==
Charlie Brown Jr.

- Chorão – vocals
- Champignon – bass guitar, backing vocals, beatboxing
- Thiago Castanho – electric guitar, backing vocals
- Marcão – electric guitar
- Renato Pelado – drums

Additional musicians

- De Menos Crime – vocals in "União"
- Radjja de Santos – vocals in "União"
- Consciência Humana – vocals in "União"
- Homens Crânio – vocals in "União"
- DJ Deco Murphy – scratches in "Confisco"
