= Acústico MTV (Charlie Brown Jr. album) =

Live album by Charlie Brown Jr.
- Released: September 20, 2003
- Recorded: August 5–6, 2003
- Venue: Teatro Mars, São Paulo
- Genre: Alternative rock, acoustic music
- Length: 1:10:21
- Label: EMI
- Director: Romi Atarashi
- Producer: Tadeu Patolla

Charlie Brown Jr. live/video albums chronology
Charlie Brown Jr. ao Vivo (2002)	Acústico MTV (2003)	Skate Vibration (2005)

Singles from Acústico MTV
- 1. "Vícios e Virtudes" Released: September 2003; 2. "Não Uso Sapato" Released: February 2004; 3. "Samba Makossa" Released: May 2004

Professional ratings
Review scores
Source	Rating
Galeria Musical	link
ISTOÉ	link

Acústico MTV (Portuguese for "MTV Unplugged") is the first live album and the second DVD by Brazilian alternative rock band Charlie Brown Jr., released both in CD and DVD formats on September 20, 2003, through EMI as part of now-defunct MTV Brasil's Acústico MTV series – the Brazilian equivalent of MTV Unplugged. It was recorded at the Teatro Mars in São Paulo from August 5–6, 2003, in a lavish set decorated as the nave of a Gothic church.

The album contains acoustic-inflected re-interpretations of some of Charlie Brown Jr.'s greatest hits, alongside previously unreleased tracks such as "Vícios e Virtudes" and "Não Uso Sapato", and covers of bands and artists such as Nação Zumbi ("Samba Makossa"), Camisa de Vênus ("Hoje") and Jorge Ben Jor ("Oba, Lá Vem Ela"). Counting with guest appearances by Negra Li, Marcelo D2 of Planet Hemp fame, Camisa de Vênus frontman Marcelo Nova and hip hop group RZO, it was one of the band's most critically acclaimed and best-selling releases; the CD version was placed ninth in the list of most best-selling albums of 2003, and the DVD version in third. Overall, the CD version sold over 250,000 copies and won a Platinum certification by Pro-Música Brasil.

As extras, the DVD contains interviews with the bandmembers, a making-of and a track-by-track commentary.

== Critical reception ==
Anderson Nascimento of Galeria Musical gave the album a maximum rating of 5 out of 5 stars, calling it one of the "coolest Acústico MTV releases ever". Mauro Ferreira of ISTOÉ also gave it a maximum rating, of 4 out of 4 stars; he considered it "the band's best release so far".

== Track listing ==
All lyrics are written by Chorão, except for "Hoje" by Karl Hummel and Marcelo Nova, "Não É Sério" by Negra Li, "Samba Makossa" by Chico Science and "Oba, Lá Vem Ela" by Jorge Ben Jor; all music is composed by Charlie Brown Jr..

No.	Title	English title	Length
1.	"Quebra-Mar"	Breakwater	1:56
2.	"O que É da Casa, É da Casa/Papo Reto (Prazer É Sexo, o Resto É Negócio)"	What Is Home, Is Home/Real Talk (Sex Is Pleasure, Everything Else Is Business)	4:34
3.	"Zóio de Lula"	Squid Eyes	3:47
4.	"Vícios e Virtudes"	Vices and Virtues	3:12
5.	"Hoje" (Camisa de Vênus cover; feat. Marcelo Nova)	Today	4:25
6.	"O Preço"	The Price	3:16
7.	"Tudo pro Alto"	Everything High	3:06
8.	"Não Uso Sapato"	I Wear No Shoes	2:55
9.	"O Côro Vai Comê!"	Things Will Get Hot!	2:10
10.	"Tudo que Ela Gosta de Escutar"	Everything She Likes to Hear	3:13
11.	"Não É Sério" (feat. Negra Li)	It Isn't Serious	5:18
12.	"Beatbox II/Como Tudo Deve Ser"	Beatbox II/As Everything Was Supposed to Be	4:44
13.	"A Banca" (feat. RZO)	The Stand	4:02
14.	"Samba Makossa" (Nação Zumbi cover; feat. Marcelo D2)		4:08
15.	"Quinta-Feira"	Thursday	5:19
16.	"Só por uma Noite"	Just for a Night	3:12
17.	"Oba, Lá Vem Ela" (Jorge Ben Jor cover)	Hooray, Here She Comes	2:49
18.	"Tudo Mudar"	For Everything to Change	2:22
19.	"Proibida pra Mim (Grazon)"	Forbidden for Me (Grazon)	2:34
20.	"Charlie Brown Jr."		3:50

== Personnel ==
=== Charlie Brown Jr. ===
- Chorão – vocals
- Champignon – acoustic bass guitar, beatboxing
- Marcão – classical guitar
- Renato Pelado – drums

=== Guest musicians ===
- Tadeu Patolla – classical guitar
- Daniel Ganjaman – keyboards and Rhodes piano in "Samba Makossa"
- Fabrício Uruca – harmonica in "Samba Makossa"
- Negra Li – additional vocals in "Não É Sério"
- RZO – additional vocals in "A Banca"
- Marcelo Nova – additional vocals in "Hoje"
- Marcelo D2 – additional vocals in "Samba Makossa"

=== Production ===
- Paulo Anhaia, Luiz Leme – mixing
- Romi Atarashi – direction
