= Skate Vibration =

Video by Charlie Brown Jr.
- Released: 2005
- Recorded: November 6, 2005
- Venue: Chorão Skate Park, Santos, São Paulo, Brazil
- Genre: Alternative rock, rap rock, skate punk, funk rock, reggae rock
- Label: EMI
- Producer: Lampadinha

Charlie Brown Jr. live/video albums chronology
Acústico MTV: Charlie Brown Jr. (2003)	Skate Vibration (2005)	Ritmo, Ritual e Responsa ao Vivo (2008)

Skate Vibration is the fourth DVD by Brazilian alternative rock band Charlie Brown Jr., released in 2005 through EMI. Was recorded on November 6 at the inauguration party of vocalist Chorão's own skatepark, aptly named Chorão Skate Park, which closed down one year after his death, in 2014. It was one of the band's first live performances with its then-new line-up of André Pinguim, Heitor Gomes and Thiago Castanho, and also counted with a guest appearance by their long-time friend and collaborator, rapper Radjja de Santos.

The DVD sold over 25,000 copies and won a Gold certification by Pro-Música Brasil.

== Track listing ==
=== Skate Vibration ===
1. "Skate Vibration"
2. "Tamo Aí na Atividade"
3. "Mantenha a Dúvida e Espere Até Ouvir Falar de Nós"
4. "Go Skate or Go Home"
5. "Vícios e Virtudes"
6. "Vivendo Nesse Absurdo"
7. "Champanhe e Água Benta"
8. "O Futuro É um Labirinto pra Quem Não Sabe o que Quer"
9. "Skateboard Jam Session" (feat. Radjja de Santos)
10. "E-Bow"

=== Lado B ===
1. "Too Fast to Live, Too Young to Die/Lutar pelo que É Meu"
2. "Onde Não Existe a Paz, Não Existe o Amor"
3. "Criando Anticorpos/O Mundo Explodiu Lá Fora"
4. "Liberdade Acima de Tudo"
5. "Onde Está o Mundo Bom? (Living in L.A.)"
6. "No Passo a Passo"
7. "É Quente"
8. "Ela Vai Voltar (Todos os Defeitos de uma Mulher Perfeita)"
9. "Pra Não Dizer que Não Falei das Flores" (Geraldo Vandré cover)

== Personnel ==
=== Charlie Brown Jr. ===
- Chorão: vocals
- Thiago Castanho: guitars
- André Pinguim: drums
- Heitor Gomes: bass guitar
