= Charlie Brown Jr. (demo tape) =

Demo album by Charlie Brown Jr.
- Released: 1995
- Genres: Crossover thrash, hardcore punk
- Length: 9:18
- Label: Self-released
- Producer: Charlie Brown Jr.

Charlie Brown Jr. is the first demo tape by eponymous Brazilian rock band Charlie Brown Jr., self-released in 1995. With songs in English and a heavier sonority than what the band would develop in future outputs, inspired by acts such as Sublime, Bad Brains and Suicidal Tendencies, the demo was a massive success in the underground scene of Santos. Copies of it were handed out as a bonus on some issues of magazine Tribo Skate in the mid-1990s.

The demo was originally recorded in 1994; according to guitarist Marcão in a 2017 interview, to finance its recording bassist Champignon had to pawn one of his bass guitars, and vocalist Chorão a television set. Champignon then approached record producer Tadeu Patolla with a copy of the demo, so he could evaluate their work; as a result, Patolla convinced Chorão to sing in Portuguese and to "experiment" more with other genres such as hip hop, reggae and ska, thus developing the eclectic sonority Charlie Brown Jr. would be known for. Subsequently, Patolla introduced the group to fellow producer Rick Bonadio, and thanks to their conjoined efforts Charlie Brown Jr. was catapulted to nationwide fame following the release of their 1997 debut album Transpiração Contínua Prolongada.

Chorão later confessed in an interview that, after listening to the demo after it was finished recording, he cried of joy.

== Track listing ==
All lyrics are written by Chorão; all music is composed by Charlie Brown Jr..

| No. | Title | Length |
|---|---|---|
| 1. | "Someone to Call" | 2:38 |
| 2. | "Rude Boy" | 2:56 |
| 3. | "Born in the Shit" | 3:51 |

== Personnel ==
- Chorão – vocals
- Champignon – bass guitar
- Thiago Castanho – electric guitar, backing vocals
- Marcão (credited as Marco Valentin) – electric guitar
- Renato Pelado – drums
- Tao Designer – cover art
