= Bocas Ordinárias =

Studio album by Charlie Brown Jr.
- Released: December 2002
- Studio: Estúdio Midas
- Genre: Alternative rock, rap rock, skate punk, nu metal, funk rock, reggae rock
- Length: 40:20
- Label: EMI
- Producer: Tadeu Patolla

Charlie Brown Jr. chronology
Abalando a Sua Fábrica (2001)	Bocas Ordinárias (2002)	Tamo Aí na Atividade (2004)

Singles from Bocas Ordinárias
- 1. "Papo Reto (Prazer É Sexo, o Resto É Negócio)" Released: December 2002; 2. "Só por uma Noite" Released: April 2003

Professional ratings
Review scores
Source	Rating
Galeria Musical	link
ISTOÉ	link
Universo Musical	Favorable link
Central da Música	Favorable link
Estadão	Favorable link

Bocas Ordinárias (Portuguese for "Ordinary Mouths") is the fifth album by Brazilian alternative rock band Charlie Brown Jr., released in December 2002 through EMI. Vocalist Chorão described it as a "sequel of sorts" to Abalando a Sua Fábrica, in which it continues the heavy aggressiveness of its predecessor, and dedicated it to his friend, fellow singer Cássia Eller, who died the year prior. The album's title comes from a Portuguese popular expression; saying someone has a "boca ordinária" means that they are foulmouthed. Chorão got acquainted with the expression after reading a negative critic from a Portuguese newspaper after the band performed in Portugal in 2002 as part of their international tour, and decided it would be the name of their next album.

Considered one of the band's finest albums by fans and critics alike, it spawned the hit singles "Papo Reto (Prazer É Sexo, o Resto É Negócio)" and "Só por uma Noite", included in the soundtrack of the tenth season of long-running soap opera Malhação (2003–2004). Also notable are "Baader–Meinhof Blues", a cover of Legião Urbana – the first cover version recorded by Charlie Brown Jr. –, and "My Mini Ramp", the band's first song fully written in English since the release of their self-titled demo tape in 1994. It sold over 500,000 copies, receiving a Gold certification by Pro-Música Brasil, and was also nominated for a Latin Grammy Award for Best Portuguese Language Rock or Alternative Album in 2003.

In 2019, to celebrate its 17th anniversary, Universal Music re-released Bocas Ordinárias in vinyl format.

== Critical reception ==
Writing for Galeria Musical, Anderson Nascimento gave the album a positive review, rating it with 4 stars out of 5 and calling it a "cleaner" release with more "understandable" songs. Mauro Ferreira of ISTOÉ, giving it 3 out of 4 stars, praised its "poetic rawness", while website Universo Musical called it the band's "heaviest and most mature release to date". Ricardo Schott of Central da Música considered it "Charlie Brown Jr.'s best album ever", and newspaper Estadão noticed the "confessional" tone of its songs. Website La Cumbuca included Bocas Ordinárias in 196th place in its list of the Top 200 Brazilian Albums of the 2000s.

== Track listing ==
All lyrics are written by Chorão, except for "Baader–Meinhof Blues" by Renato Russo; all music is composed by Charlie Brown Jr..

No.	Title	English title	Length
1.	"Papo Reto (Prazer É Sexo, o Resto É Negócio)"	Real Talk (Sex Is Pleasure, Everything Else Is Business)	3:30
2.	"Hoje Eu Só Procuro a Minha Paz"	Today I'm Only Searching for My Peace	4:12
3.	"Baader–Meinhof Blues" (Legião Urbana cover)		2:53
4.	"Só por uma Noite"	Just for a Night	3:23
5.	"My Mini Ramp"		2:12
6.	"Bocas Ordinárias, Guerrilha"	Ordinary Mouths, Guerrilla	4:16
7.	"Não Fure os Olhos da Verdade"	Don't Pierce the Eyes of Truth	2:47
8.	"Sou Quem Eu Sou (O que É Seu Também É Meu e o que É Meu Não É Nosso)"	I Am Who I Am (What's Yours Is Also Mine and What's Mine Isn't Ours)	3:19
9.	"Com Minha Loucura Faço Meu Dinheiro, com Meu Dinheiro Faço Minhas Loucuras"	With My Madness I Make My Money, with My Money I Make My Madness	2:28
10.	"Somos Poucos, Mas Somos Loucos"	We're Few, but We're Insane	5:30
11.	"Com a Boca Amargando"	With a Bitter Mouth	5:04
12.	"Tarja Preta"	Black Sash	2:46

== Personnel ==
Charlie Brown Jr.

- Chorão – vocals
- Champignon – bass guitar
- Marcão – guitars
- Renato Pelado – drums

Production

- Jorge Davidson – A&R
- Charlie Brown Jr. – arrangements
- Tadeu Patolla – production
- Tadeu Patolla, Paulo Anhaia, Lampadinha and Renato Patriarca – recording
- Edgar, Pistão and Nilton Baloni – recording assistants
- Tadeu Patolla and Paulo Anhaia – mixing
- Rodrigo Castanho – mastering
- Celso Costa – production assistant
- Adrian Philippe – executive production

== Certifications ==
Region	Certification	Certified units/sales
Brazil (Pro-Música Brasil)	Gold	50,000^{*}
^{*} Sales figures based on certification alone.
