= Éramos Quatro =

Éramos 4

Studio album by Raimundos
- Released: 2001
- Recorded: 1993 (track 2); 1998 (track 3); 2000 (track 4-13) 2001 (track 1)
- Genres: Hardcore punk, alternative metal, punk rock
- Length: 28:52
- Label: Warner Music
- Producers: Carlos Eduardo Miranda, Dzcuts, Mauro Manzoli and Tom Capone

Raimundos chronology
Só No Forévis (1999)	Éramos 4 (2001)	Kavookavala (2002)

Éramos 4 (transl. We Were 4, a pun on Éramos Seis) is the seventh album of the Brazilian band Raimundos. It was launched in 2001, after the exit of the founding singer Rodolfo Abrantes. The disc contains basically cover songs of Ramones, played live with Marky Ramone, ex-drummer of the Ramones.

== Track listing ==
1. "Sanidade" (Sanity)
2. "Desculpe, Mas Eu Vou Chorar" (Sorry, but I will cry) (Leandro & Leonardo cover)
3. "Nana Neném" (Sleep, Baby)
4. "Sheena Is A Punk Rocker"
5. "Rockaway Beach"
6. "Teenage Lobotomy"
7. "I Wanna Be Well"
8. "I Don't Care"
9. "Rock 'n' Roll High School"
10. "Needles and Pins"
11. "Do You Wanna Dance?"
12. "Pinhead"
13. "Blitzkrieg Bop"

== Personnel ==
- Rodolfo – vocals except in track 1
- Digão – lead guitar, vocals in track 1,backing vocals
- Marquim – lead guitar in track 1
- Canisso – bass guitar, backing vocals
- Fred Castro – drums in tracks 1–3

== Special guests ==
- Marky Ramone – drums in tracks from 4 to 13
