= Lugar ao Sol =

2001 song by Charlie Brown Jr.

Single by Charlie Brown Jr.

from the album 100% Charlie Brown Jr. - Abalando a Sua Fábrica
- Released: 2001
- Genre: Alternative rock
- Length: 3:31
- Label: Virgin
- Composers: Chorão, Marcão Britto

Charlie Brown Jr. singles chronology
"Tudo Mudar" (2000)	"Lugar ao Sol" (2001)	"Hoje Eu Acordei Feliz" (2001)

"Lugar ao Sol" (trans. "A Place by the Sun") is a song by the Brazilian rock band Charlie Brown Jr., originally released in 2001 as the first single of the 2001 album Abalando a Sua Fábrica. This song was written by the band's vocalist Chorão. It is a tribute to his late father who died the previous year.

== iTunes Brazil ==
After Chorão's death in 2013, "Lugar ao Sol" placed number four among the most fast selling songs of the week in ITunes Brazil.

== Covers ==
- in 2017, the Raimundos recorded an acoustic cover on the album Raimundos Acústico.
- in 2021, Sandy recorded a version of the song with his husband Lucas Lima. The song originally premiered in the inspiration block of Caldeirão do Huck. A music video was also made, which is available on the singer's YouTube channel.
- A Revamp version interpreted by Tiago Mayer was added to the soundtrack of the movie Mais Forte que o Mundo.
