= Contra Insetos Parasitas =

2008 studio album by TH6

Studio album by TH6
- Released: July 28, 2008 (Myspace); October 14, 2008 (CD)
- Recorded: 2007–08
- Genres: Alternative rock; pop rock; funk rock; rap rock; nu metal
- Length: 58:18
- Label: Self-released
- Producers: Marcão, Tadeu Patolla

Contra Insetos Parasitas (Portuguese for "Against Parasitic Insects") is the only release by Brazilian alternative rock band TH6. It was initially made available for streaming on the band's official Myspace page on July 28, 2008, and came out in physical format later on October 14. Produced by vocalist/guitarist/sole lyricist Marcão (formerly of Charlie Brown Jr.) and Tadeu Patolla (who had also collaborated with Charlie Brown Jr. previously), it counted with numerous guest appearances by musicians such as Di Ferrero and Gee Rocha of NX Zero, Badauí of CPM 22, Tico Santa Cruz of Detonautas Roque Clube, Baía of Tihuana, Marcão's former Charlie Brown Jr. bandmates Champignon and Renato Pelado, and Pablo Silva, who had played alongside Champignon on his former project Revolucionnários. A music video was later made for the track "Mesmo Lugar".

In 2009 the band would elaborate that they recorded over 40 tracks for the album, selecting 25 for inclusion; two of those outtakes, "Que Fase" and "De Boa", were later uploaded to their Myspace. The remaining, as of 2010 (when the group ceased their activities), have yet to be released.

== Critical reception ==
The album was received positively upon its release, with critics praising the band's sonority mixing influences from hardcore punk, dub, rap rock and nu metal. A review from website ZP called it "a great debut, more accessible and pop-sounding than Charlie Brown Jr.'s last releases".

== Track listing ==
All lyrics are written by Marcão; all music is composed by TH6.

No.	Title	English title	Length
1.	"Vinheta" (instrumental)	Vignette	0:16
2.	"Revoltas"	Turmoils	2:56
3.	"Mentiras" (feat. Gee Rocha)	Lies	2:31
4.	"No Mesmo Lugar"	In the Same Place	2:23
5.	"Do Início ao Fim" (feat. Di Ferrero)	From Beginning to End	1:58
6.	"Pinga" (feat. Tico Santa Cruz)		2:03
7.	"Como se Fosse Assim" (feat. Badauí)	As If It Was Like This	2:50
8.	"Um Dia Daqueles"	One of These Days	2:44
9.	"Um Passo Atrás"	A Step Behind	1:56
10.	"Pequenos Detalhes"	Little Details	1:44
11.	"Linha de Montagem" (feat. Renato Pelado)	Assembly Line	2:33
12.	"Outros Dias"	Other Days	1:46
13.	"Tanto Faz"	Whatever	2:43
14.	"Fingir Jamais"	Never Pretend	2:49
15.	"Cicatrizando os Cortes"	Scarring the Cuts	2:45
16.	"Vida de Mané"	The Life of a Dork	1:59
17.	"Noise in Dub" (instrumental; feat. Pablo Silva)		1:57
18.	"Nem um Segundo"	Not a Second	2:29
19.	"Chapeuzinho Vermelho"	Little Red Riding Hood	2:08
20.	"É Tudo TH6" (feat. Champignon and Renato Pelado)	Everything Is TH6	2:44
21.	"Insanidade Coletiva" (feat. Baía)	Collective Insanity	2:32
22.	"Treta de Bar"	Bar Fight	2:33
23.	"Mais Tempo"	More Time	2:47
24.	"Cíntia"		2:20
25.	"A Solução"	The Solution	2:38

== Personnel ==
TH6

- Marcão – vocals, electric guitar
- Tite Martins – lead vocals
- Filipe Costa – drums
- Lenon Scarpa – bass guitar, backing vocals

Guest musicians

- Gee Rocha – vocals (track 3)
- Di Ferrero – vocals (track 5)
- Tico Santa Cruz – vocals (track 6)
- Badauí – vocals (track 7)
- Renato Pelado – drums, additional vocals (tracks 11 and 20)
- Pablo Silva – drums (track 17)
- Champignon – bass guitar, additional vocals (track 20)
- Baía – vocals (track 21)

Production

- Tadeu Patolla – production
- Rodrigo Castanho – mixing
