= Tamo Aí na Atividade =

Studio album by Charlie Brown Jr.
- Released: December 2004
- Recorded: 2004
- Studio: Estúdio Midas, São Paulo
- Genre: Alternative rock, rap rock, skate punk, funk rock, reggae rock
- Length: 37:18
- Label: EMI
- Producer: Rick Bonadio

Charlie Brown Jr. chronology
Bocas Ordinárias (2002)	Tamo Aí na Atividade (2004)	Imunidade Musical (2005)

Singles from Tamo Aí na Atividade
- 1. "Champanhe e Água Benta" Released: December 2004; 2. "Tamo Aí na Atividade" Released: 2005

Professional ratings
Review scores
Source	Rating
Galeria Musical	link

Tamo Aí na Atividade (Portuguese for "Here We Are, Up to Something") is the sixth studio album by Brazilian alternative rock band Charlie Brown Jr., released in December 2004 through EMI. The band's first album since 1999's Preço Curto... Prazo Longo to be produced by Rick Bonadio, it spawned the hit singles "Champanhe e Água Benta" and the titular "Tamo Aí na Atividade". Also notable is "Todos Iguais", the only credited work of bassist Champignon as a drummer in all of his career. The music video for "Champanhe e Água Benta" received nominations for the MTV Video Music Brazil award in the "Video of the Year", "Best Rock Video" and "Best Editing in a Video" categories in 2005; directors Roberto Oliveira and Alex Miranda were nominated in the "Best Direction in a Video" category.

It received positive reviews upon its release, awarding the band a Multishow Brazilian Music Award nomination and a Latin Grammy Award for Best Portuguese Language Rock or Alternative Album in 2005; the first one to be won by Charlie Brown Jr. after their previous works Nadando com os Tubarões and Bocas Ordinárias received nominations. Selling over 100,000 copies, it received a Platinum certification by Pro-Música Brasil.

The recording sessions of Tamo Aí na Atividade were plagued by creative divergences and clashes between vocalist Chorão and his bandmates, which led to a deterioration of the relationship between them. In 2005, shortly after the album's release, Champignon, guitarist Marcão and drummer Renato Pelado all left Charlie Brown Jr., and Chorão put the band on hold for a brief period of time before reactivating it with a new line-up. Champignon and Marcão would only return to the group in 2011.

== Critical reception ==
Anderson Nascimento of Galeria Musical gave the album a positive rating of 4 out of 5 stars, praising the inclusion of electronic beats and interludes and Rick Bonadio's "competent production".

== Track listing ==
All lyrics are written by Chorão; all music is composed by Charlie Brown Jr.

No.	Title	English title	Length
1.	"Malabarizando (Quem É de Fé Continua com a Gente)"	Juggling (Those Who Have Faith Keep Up with Us)	1:40
2.	"Champanhe e Água Benta"	Champagne and Holy Water	2:31
3.	"Tamo Aí na Atividade"	Here We Are, Up to Something	3:39
4.	"Eu Vim de Santos, Sou Charlie Brown"	I Came from Santos, I'm Charlie Brown	4:06
5.	"So Far Away"		2:21
6.	"Longe de Você"	Far Away from You	3:22
7.	"Di-SK8 Eu Vim"	Skateboarding I Came	1:18
8.	"Di-SK8 Eu Vou"	Skateboarding I'll Go	3:21
9.	"Vivendo Nesse Absurdo"	Living in This Absurd	4:33
10.	"Todos Iguais"	All the Same	4:03
11.	"Cheirando Cola"	Sniffing Glue	1:34
12.	"O Errado que Deu Certo"	The Wrong That Made a Right	2:50
13.	"Malokêro SK8 Board"		2:09
14.	"Indicados para o Prêmio Nobel da Paz"	Nominees for the Nobel Peace Prize	2:06
15.	"O Lixo e o Luxo"	Trash and Luxury	2:43

== Personnel ==
Charlie Brown Jr.

- Chorão – vocals, programming (1, 7, 13), scratches (1, 7)
- Champignon – bass guitar, guitar and programming (on "Di-SK8 Eu Vou"), drums (on "Todos Iguais")
- Marcão – acoustic and electric guitars
- Renato Pelado – drums (2, 3, 5, 6, 9, 12–14), percussion (on "Cheirando Cola")

Additional musicians

- Alexandre Ciaglia – programming (1, 7, 13)
- Rick Bonadio – programming and Moog keyboard (on "Eu Vim de Santos, Sou Chaflie Brown")
- DJ Cia – scratches (on "Eu Vim de Santos, Sou Charlie Brown")
- José Simoniam – flute (on "Di-SK8 Eu Vou")

== Certifications ==
Region	Certification	Certified units/sales
Brazil (Pro-Música Brasil)	Platinum	125,000^{*}
^{*} Sales figures based on certification alone.
