= Zóio de Lula =

1999 song by Charlie Brown Jr.

Single by Charlie Brown Jr.

from the album Preço Curto... Prazo Longo
- Released: April 1, 1999
- Genre: Reggae rock
- Length: 4:12
- Label: Virgin Records; Universal Music Group (2019 re-issue)
- Songwriters: Chorão; Champignon; Renato Pelado
- Producers: Rick Bonadio; Tadeu Patolla; Marcelo Lobato (2019 re-issue)

Charlie Brown Jr. singles chronology
"Gimme o Anel" (1998)	"Zóio de Lula" (1999)	"Te Levar" (1999)

Music video
- "Zóio de Lula" on YouTube

Alternative cover
- 2019 re-issue

"Zóio de Lula" (Portuguese for "Squid Eyes"), also stylized as "Zóio D Lula", is a single by Brazilian alternative rock band Charlie Brown Jr. Written by vocalist Chorão (who also drew the cover) alongside his bandmates Champignon and Renato Pelado, it was released on April 1, 1999 as the first single of their second studio album, Preço Curto... Prazo Longo, even though it previously appeared on the teaser EP Aquele Luxo!.

It was the first song by the band to reach first place in Brazilian radios at the time, and a music video counting with a guest appearance by model and actress Luize Altenhofen was made; filmed at the beach of Maresias, it won the MTV Video Music Award for International Viewer's Choice in 1999. The video's director, Johnny Araújo, would become a frequent collaborator of the band, and also direct the 2007 film O Magnata, written and co-produced by Chorão.

Bands Hevo84, Fake Number, Gloria and Replace performed a medley of "Zóio de Lula" with Raimundos' "Mulher de Fases" at the 2010 MTV Video Music Brazil ceremony, to celebrate the 20th anniversary of MTV Brasil. Sambô, Anitta, Lucas Lucco and Natiruts, among others, have also made their covers of the song.

On April 9, 2019, celebrating what would have been Chorão's 49th birthday and the 20th anniversary of the song's release, Universal Music Group re-issued the single in a special edition containing both the original Charlie Brown Jr. version and a new cover featuring singers Marcelo D2 and Hungria Hip Hop, and bands Nação Zumbi and Maneva. The re-issue was produced by Marcelo Lobato of O Rappa fame.

== Track listing ==
=== Original CD single ===
1. "Zóio de Lula" – 4:12

=== 2019 re-issue ===
1. "Zóio de Lula" (original version) – 4:12
2. "Zóio de Lula" (feat. Marcelo D2, Hungria Hip Hop, Nação Zumbi and Maneva) – 3:58

== Certifications ==
Certifications for "Zóio de Lula"
Region	Certification	Certified units/sales
Brazil (Pro-Música Brasil)	Gold	50,000^{‡}
^{‡} Sales+streaming figures based on certification alone.
