= Lapadas do Povo =

Studio album by Raimundos
- Released: 1997
- Recorded: 1997
- Genre: Hardcore punk; crossover thrash
- Length: 30:19
- Label: Warner Music
- Producer: Mark Dearnley

Raimundos chronology
Cesta Básica (1996)	Lapadas do Povo (1997)	Só No Forévis (1999)

Lapadas do Povo (transl. Slaps of the People) is the third album of the Brazilian band Raimundos. It was launched in 1997, and produced by Mark Dearnley, at Sound City Studio, in Los Angeles. Reviewers of the album found it to be pleasantly heavier than the band's previous offerings, but that came at the cost of the removal of some of their prior local Northeastern Brazilian flavor.

== Track listing ==
1. "Andar na Pedra" (Walking on the rock)
2. "Véio, Manco E Gordo" (Old, lame and fat)
3. "O Toco" (The piece of wood)
4. "Poquito Más (Healthy Food)" (A little more (Healthy Food))
5. "Wipe Out"
6. "CC De Com Força"
7. "Crumis Ódamis"
8. "Bonita" (Pretty)
9. "Ui, Ui, Ui"
10. "Oliver’s Army (Elvis Costello cover)"
11. "Pequena Raimunda (Ramones parody)"
12. "Baile Funky"
13. "Bass Hell (Bônus Crap)"

== Personnel ==
- Digão – lead guitar, vocals
- Rodolfo Abrantes – lead vocals, rhythm guitar
- Canisso – bass guitar
- Fred Castro – drums
