= Raimundos (album) =

Studio album by Raimundos
- Released: 1994
- Recorded: Estúdio Be Bop, 1994
- Genres: Hardcore punk, forrocore
- Length: 39:52
- Label: Banguela Records/Warner Records
- Producers: Carlos Eduardo Miranda and Raimundos

Raimundos chronology
| Raimundos (1994) | Lavô Tá Novo (1995) |

Professional ratings
Review scores
| Source | Rating |
|---|---|
| Allmusic | 3/5 stars |

Raimundos is the first album by the Brazilian hardcore punk band Raimundos, released in 1994 through Banguela Records. Recorded over a few weeks in Estúdio Be Bop, in São Paulo, it has sold 120,000 copies.

== Track listing ==
All lyrics are written by Rodolfo Abrantes; all music is composed by Raimundos (except where indicated).

| No. | Title | Lyrics | Music | Note | Length |
|---|---|---|---|---|---|
| 1. | "Puteiro em João Pessoa" (Brothel in João Pessoa) | | | | 3:07 |
| 2. | "Palhas do Coqueiro" (Coconut-tree's leaves) | Martin Luthero, Evandro Vieira | Martin Luthero, Raimundos | | 1:58 |
| 3. | "MM'S" | | | | 1:59 |
| 4. | "Minha Cunhada" (My Sister-in-law) | Martin Luthero, Rodolfo Abrantes | Martin Luthero, Raimundos | | 1:21 |
| 5. | "Rapante" | | | | 3:03 |
| 6. | "Carro Forte" (Armored Car) | Public domain, adapted by Raimundos | | | 1:29 |
| 7. | "Nêga Jurema" (Black Girl Jurema) | Rodolfo Abrantes | Rodolfo Abrantes | | 1:52 |
| 8. | "Deixei de Fumar (Cachimbo da Mulher) / Cana Caiana" (Stopped Smoking (Women's Pipe) /) | Durval Vieira, Graças Góes / Zenilton, Tio Jovem | Durval Vieira, Graças Góes / Zenilton, Tio Jovem | | 1:30 |
| 9. | "Cajueiro / Rio das Pedras" (Cashew Tree) | Public domain, adapted by Raimundos, Martin Luthero / Zenilton, Durval Vieira | Public domain, adapted by Raimundos, Martin Luthero / Zenilton, Durval Vieira | | 2:30 |
| 10. | "Bê a Bá" (B + A = Ba) | | | | 2:30 |
| 11. | "Bicharada" (Animals) | | | | 1:37 |
| 12. | "Marujo" (Sailor) | Martin Luthero, Rodolfo Abrantes | Martin Luthero, Raimundos | | 2:31 |
| 13. | "Cintura fina" (Thin Waist) | | | | 2:35 |
| 14. | "Selim" (Bike Saddle) | Cristiano Telles, Raimundos | Cristiano Telles, Raimundos | | 4:12 |
| 15. | "Puteiro em João Pessoa II" (Brothel in João Pessoa II) | | | CD bonus track | 3:07 |
| 16. | "Selim Acústico" (Bike Saddle Acoustic) | Cristiano Telles, Raimundos | Cristiano Telles, Raimundos | CD bonus track | 4:12 |
| Total length: | | | | | 39:52 |

== Personnel ==
- Digão – guitar
- Rodolfo Abrantes – lead vocals
- Canisso – bass guitar
- Fred Castro – drums

== Additional Musicians ==
- Carlos Eduardo Miranda – vocals (4), pandeiro (13)
- Guilherme Bonolo – vocals (1, 2, 4, 7, 8, 12, 13), lead guitar (3, 16)
- João Gordo – vocals (3)
- Paulo Miklos – vocals (6, 10, 11)
- Sérgio Britto – vocals (6, 10, 11)
- Branco Mello – vocals (6, 10, 11)
- Nando Reis – acoustic guitar (1), viola (16)
- Zenilton – accordion (9, 12)
