= Donsome Records =

Record label

Donsome Records is a record label based in Pelham, New York. The label is run by producer Adrian Donsome Hanson, and the company also manages bookings for reggae artist Marcia Griffiths.

In 2012 the label released the Amore Riddim produced by Adrian Donsome Hanson and featuring some of reggae top artistes and also introduced some newcomers.

In June 2012 The label signed Dominican reggae artiste Aima Moses, right after Adrian Donsome Hanson and Aima Moses started to work on a lot of singles and release Moses's first Mixtape

Since the release of Moses mix tape, "Donsome Records Presents: Aima Moses Jah We Need You". The following month Moses toured in Canada.

The following year Donsome Records release the single "Make it One Day" by Aima Moses and produced by Adrian Donsome Hanson and followed up with the video a couple months later, while promoting the single, Aima Moses open up for Tony Rebel and Queen Ifrica at club Sur in Seattle, Washington,

On August 13, 2013, the label released Stock and Pile by Gyptian.

In 2016 Negra Li released a single called "Sunshine" featuring her husband Jr. Dread, the song was written and produced by Hanson for Donsome Records.

In 2016 the label released Dancehall Brukout vol. 1 compilation album by Various artists including vybz Kartel, Konshens, Ding Dong, Pamputtae, Lady Saw, RDX, Demarco just to name a few and it was Produced and executive Produced by Adrian Donsome Hanson

In 2018 Spice signed a publishing deal with Donsome Records, The Label and Spice professional relationship goes back 11 years, when Adrian Donsome Hanson produced a song with Spice in 2008 called Stress Free, The label is also Spice Sound exchange Specialist, In June 2019 Riddim-Don Magazine which is a subsidiary of Donsome Records was the promoter for a show in New Haven Connecticut, which Spice Headline
