= Cesta Básica =

Compilation album by Raimundos
- Released: 1996
- Genre: Hardcore punk, alternative metal, forrocore
- Length: 28:52
- Label: Warner Music
- Producer: Tom Capone, Guilherme Bonolo and Raimundos

Raimundos chronology
| Lavô Tá Novo (1995) | Cesta Básica (1996) | Lapadas Do Povo (1997) |

Cesta Básica (transl. Food Parcel) is a box compilation of the Brazilian band Raimundos. It was launched in 1996, consisting of a comic book, a VHS tape and a CD-ROM. Its name comes from the Brazilian "cesta básica" (trans. lit.: "basic basket"), a bundle of food items such as rice, beans, noodles, sugar and salt, commonly distributed by the government to poor families, as well as by companies as a supplement to a worker's income.

== Track listing ==
1. "Infeliz Natal" (Unmerry Christmas)
2. "A Sua" (Yours)
3. "Papeau Nuky Doe"
4. "Merry Christmas (Ramones cover)"
5. "Bodies (Sex Pistols cover)"
6. "Puteiro em João Pessoa (Remix)" (Brothel in João Pessoa (remix))
7. "Esporrei na Manivela (Ao Vivo no festival Hollywood Rock de 1996)" (I came on the crank (Live at Hollywood Rock of 1996))
8. "Bê a Bá (Ao Vivo no festival Hollywood Rock de 1996)" (Bê a Bá (Live at Hollywood Rock of 1996))
9. "Cajueiro (Ao Vivo no festival Hollywood Rock de 1996)" (Cashew tree (Live at Hollywood Rock of 1996))
10. "Palhas do coqueiro (Ao Vivo no festival Hollywood Rock de 1996)" (Coconut-tree leaves (Live at Hollywood Rock of 1996))

== Personnel ==
- Digão – lead guitar, vocals
- Rodolfo – lead vocals, rhythm guitar
- Canisso – bass guitar
- Fred – drums
