= Transpiração Contínua Prolongada =

Studio album by Charlie Brown Jr.
- Released: June 16, 1997
- Studio: Estúdio Bonadio
- Genre: Alternative rock, rap rock, skate punk, funk rock, reggae rock
- Length: 41:41
- Label: Virgin Records
- Producer: Rick Bonadio, Tadeu Patolla

Charlie Brown Jr. chronology
Transpiração Contínua Prolongada (1997)	Preço Curto... Prazo Longo (1999)

Singles from Transpiração Contínua Prolongada
- 1. "O Côro Vai Comê!" Released: 1997; 2. "Proibida pra Mim (Grazon)" Released: 1997; 3. "Tudo que Ela Gosta de Escutar" Released: 1998; 4. "Quinta-Feira" Released: 1998; 5. "Gimme o Anel" Released: 1998

Professional ratings
Review scores
Source	Rating
Galeria Musical	link

Transpiração Contínua Prolongada (Portuguese for 'Prolonged Continuous Sweating') is the debut album by Brazilian alternative rock band Charlie Brown Jr., released on June 16, 1997 through Virgin Records. It was one of the band's many releases to be produced by the duo Rick Bonadio and Tadeu Patolla, and the latter's own band, Lagoa, made a guest appearance on the track "Escalas Tropicais" in one of their final credited works prior to their break-up. Other guest musicians include rappers P.MC and DJ Deco Murphy, famous for their partnership and their later work on hip hop group Jigaboo.

According to the band's guitarist, Marcão, in a 2017 interview following the album's 20th anniversary, its name was an allusion to all the hard work they endured until they were able to record it.

Transpiração Contínua Prolongada spawned five hit singles and, despite initial mixed reception at the time of its release, it was a commercial success, selling over 250,000 copies and getting a Platinum certification by Pro-Música Brasil. As of 2013, the album had sold over 650,000 copies overall. Eight years later, "Aquela Paz" was re-recorded for their album Imunidade Musical.

The album was re-released twice; in 2013 by EMI, following the death of vocalist Chorão, and in 2017 by Universal Music, in a double-disc 20th-anniversary deluxe edition. The second disc serves as a greatest hits album, containing some of the band's most well known singles throughout their career.

== Critical reception ==
In a retrospective review of the band's discography, Anderson Nascimento of Galeria Musical gave Transpiração Contínua Prolongada a positive review, rating it with 4 stars out of 5. He praised the band's originality, heavy sound and attitude. Conversely, a contemporary review by Cláudio Luís de Souza for newspaper Diário do Grande ABC from June 6, 1999 called the album's sonority (and the band's overall) "derivative" and criticized Chorão's songwriting as "crude and silly".

== Track listing ==
All lyrics are written by Chorão, except where noted.

No.	Title	Lyrics	Music	English title	Length
1.	"Tributo ao Frango da Malásia"	Instrumental	Chorão	Tribute to the Malaysian Chicken	0:25
2.	"O Côro Vai Comê!"		Renato Pelado	Things Will Get Hot!	2:21
3.	"Tudo Que Ela Gosta de Escutar"	Chorão, Pelado	Chorão, Marcão	Everything She Likes to Hear	2:56
4.	"Sheik"		Chorão, Marcão		2:52
5.	"Hey! Arreia..."	Instrumental	Chorão		0:27
6.	"Gimme o Anel"		Champignon	Gimme the Ring	2:48
7.	"Molengol's Groove"	Instrumental	Chorão		0:52
8.	"Aquela Paz"		Thiago Castanho	That Peace	3:02
9.	"Quinta-Feira"		Pelado	Thursday	4:49
10.	"Proibida pra Mim (Grazon)"		Castanho, Marcão	Forbidden for Me (Grazon)	2:44
11.	"Lombra"		Castanho	Stoned	3:10
12.	"Corra, Vagabundo"	Champignon	Champignon	Run, Bum	3:35
13.	"Falar, Falar..."		Castanho, Champignon, Chorão, Marcão, Pelado	Talk, Talk...	2:48
14.	"Festa"		Marcão	Party	2:49
15.	"Escalas Tropicais" (feat. Lagoa)		Tadeu Patolla	Tropical Scales	2:05
16.	"Charlie Brown Jr."		Marcão		3:13

2017 re-release bonus tracks
No.	Title	English title	Length
17.	"Zóio de Lula"	Squid Eyes	4:12
18.	"Papo Reto (Prazer é Sexo, o Resto é Negócio)"	Real Talk (Sex Is Pleasure, Everything Else Is Business)	3:30
19.	"Não é Sério" (feat. Negra Li)	It Isn't Serious	4:50
20.	"Lugar ao Sol"	A Place by the Sun	3:32
21.	"Lutar Pelo Que é Meu"	Fighting for What's Mine	3:20
22.	"Confisco"	Confiscation	3:00
23.	"Rubão, o Dono do Mundo"	Rubão, the Owner of the World	2:17
24.	"Champanhe e Água Benta"	Champagne and Holy Water	2:31
25.	"Ela Vai Voltar (Todos os Defeitos de Uma Mulher Perfeita)"	She'll Be Back (All the Defects of a Perfect Woman)	3:07
26.	"Te Levar"	Taking You Away	3:04
27.	"Hoje Eu Acordei Feliz"	I Woke Up Happy Today	2:18
28.	"Não Deixe o Mar Te Engolir"	Don't Let the Sea Swallow You	5:09
29.	"Só Por Uma Noite"	Just for a Night	3:23
30.	"Vícios e Virtudes"	Vices and Virtues	3:12
31.	"Senhor do Tempo"	Lord of Weather	3:22

== Personnel ==
=== Charlie Brown Jr. ===
- Chorão: vocals
- Champignon: bass guitar, backing vocals, beatboxing
- Thiago Castanho: electric guitar, backing vocals
- Marcão: electric guitar
- Renato Pelado: drums

=== Additional musicians ===
- Rick Bonadio: electric guitar in "Aquela Paz", solo guitar in "Quinta-Feira", sampler in "Charlie Brown Jr."
- Tadeu Patolla/Lagoa: arrangements in "Escalas Tropicais"
- P.MC: rapping in "Lombra"
- DJ Deco Murphy: scratches in "Lombra" and "Charlie Brown Jr."

=== Production ===
- Charlie Brown Jr.: arrangements
- Rick Bonadio: production, recording engineer, mastering, mixing
- Rodrigo Castanho: mastering, mixing
- Sergio Panda: roadie
- Planeta Digital (Benê Armas and Suely de Carvalho): art direction
- Mário Fontes: front cover art
- Speto: back cover art
- Shin Shikuma: photography

== Certifications ==
Region	Certification	Certified units/sales
Brazil (Pro-Música Brasil)	Platinum	250,000^{*}
^{*} Sales figures based on certification alone.
