= Abalando a Sua Fábrica =

Studio album by Charlie Brown Jr.
- Released: November 1, 2001
- Studio: Estúdio Mega
- Genre: Alternative rock, rap rock, skate punk, funk rock, reggae rock, garage rock
- Length: 36:09
- Label: EMI
- Producer: Carlo Bartolini

Charlie Brown Jr. chronology
Nadando com os Tubarões (2000)	Abalando a Sua Fábrica (2001)	Bocas Ordinárias (2002)

Singles from Abalando a Sua Fábrica
- 1. "Lugar ao Sol" Released: October 2001; 2. "Hoje Eu Acordei Feliz" Released: April 2002; 3. "Como Tudo Deve Ser" Released: September 2002

Professional ratings
Review scores
Source	Rating
Galeria Musical	link

Abalando a Sua Fábrica (Portuguese for "Shaking Your Factory"^{[A]}), also referred to as 100% Charlie Brown Jr. – Abalando a Sua Fábrica as per the cover, is the fourth album by Brazilian alternative rock band Charlie Brown Jr. Released on November 1, 2001 through EMI, it was the band's first album not to come out through Virgin Records, to count with guest appearances by other musicians, and to be produced by either Rick Bonadio or Tadeu Patolla.

Abalando a Sua Fábrica sees the band shifting away from their previous rap rock-inflected sonority, advancing towards a "rawer" style more influenced by punk and garage rock. It was also recorded with all instrumental parts simultaneously instead of one at a time, as if they were recording live. The album spawned three hit singles: "Lugar ao Sol", "Hoje Eu Acordei Feliz" (which had a critically acclaimed music video directed by filmmaker André Abujamra) and "Como Tudo Deve Ser", included in the soundtrack of SBT's reality show Casa dos Artistas. Selling over 100,000 copies, it won a Gold certification by Pro-Música Brasil.

== Critical reception ==
Writing for Galeria Musical, Anderson Nascimento gave the album a positive review, rating it with 3 stars out of 5 and calling it a "refreshing" release.

== Track listing ==
All lyrics are written by Chorão.

No.	Title	Music	English title	Length
1.	"Eu Protesto"	Chorão	I Protest	4:28
2.	"Hoje Eu Acordei Feliz"	Chorão, Marcão	I Woke Up Happy Today	2:18
3.	"Sino Dourado"	Chorão	Golden Bell	2:41
4.	"Quebra-Mar"	Chorão, Marcão	Breakwater	2:57
5.	"Lugar ao Sol"	Chorão, Marcão	A Place by the Sun	3:32
6.	"Descubra o Que Há de Errado Com Você"	Champignon, Chorão	Find Out What's Wrong with You	1:39
7.	"Só Lazer"	Champignon, Chorão	Just for Fun	2:58
8.	"Você Vai de Limusine, Eu Vou de Trem"	Chorão	You Take the Limo, I Take the Train	2:57
9.	"O Lado Certo da Vida Errada"	Chorão, Marcão	The Right Side of the Wrong Life	1:49
10.	"T.F.D.P.^{[B]}"	Champignon, Chorão, Marcão		2:51
11.	"Tudo pro Alto"	Chorão, Renato Pelado	Everything High	3:23
12.	"Como Tudo Deve Ser"	Champignon, Chorão	As Everything Was Supposed to Be	4:33

== Personnel ==
Charlie Brown Jr.

- Chorão – vocals
- Champignon – bass guitar
- Marcão – guitars
- Renato Pelado – drums

Production

- Torcuato Mariano – A&R
- Carlo Bartolini – production, mixing, recording
- Carlos Freitas – mastering
- Jade Pereira – mastering assistant
- Lulu Farah, Sanclair Lima – digital editing
- Outhenberg Pereira, Leonardo Waack, Marco Hoffer – additional engineering

== Notes ==
- A. A rough equivalent English-language expression is "raising the roof"
- B. Acronym for "Tudo Filho da Puta" ("They All Motherfuckers")
