= Maneva (band) =

Brazilian reggae group

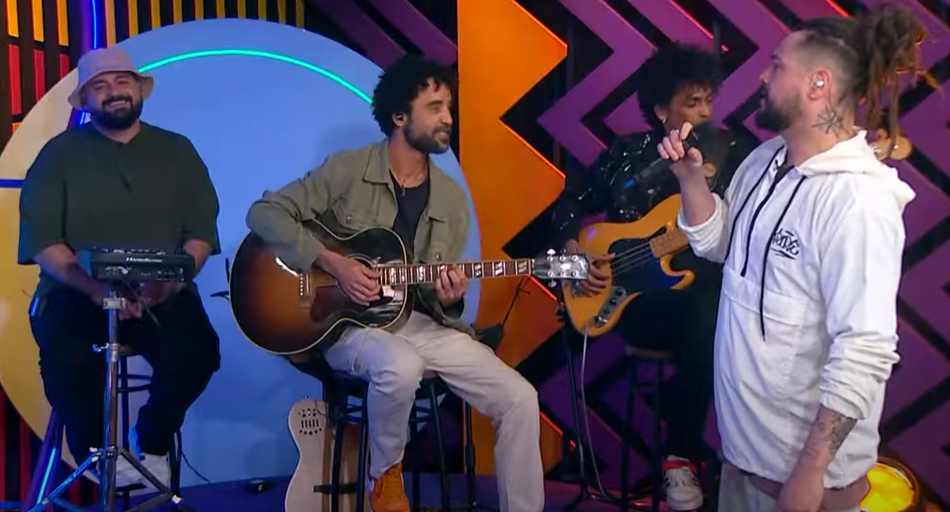
- The band performing in 2023

Background information
- Origin: São Paulo, Brazil
- Genres: Reggae, reggae rock, acoustic music
- Years active: 2005–present
- Labels: Universal Music Group
- Members: Tales de Polli; Felipe Sousa; Fernando Gato; Fabinho Araújo; Diego Andrade
- Website: maneva.com.br

Maneva is a Brazilian reggae band from São Paulo.

== History ==
The band was formed in 2005 by friends Tales de Polli (vocals), Felipe Sousa (guitar), Fernando Gato (bass), Fabinho Araújo (drum kit) and Diego Andrade (percussion). They claim their name comes from an African word meaning "pleasure". Their first self-titled studio album was self-released in 2006.

Their first DVD, recorded at a performance celebrating their 8th anniversary, came out in 2013. Since then two other were released in 2017 and 2018, recorded at São Paulo and São Bernardo do Campo respectively.

In 2018 the music video for their song "Pisando Descalço" reached over a million views on YouTube in less than a week.

In 2019 they collaborated with Nação Zumbi, Hungria Hip Hop and Marcelo D2 to record a commemorative cover of Charlie Brown Jr.'s song "Zóio de Lula".

Celebrating their 15th anniversary in 2020, they released the six-track conceptual EP O Cabeça de Folha, which counted with a guest appearance by singer Vitor Kley. An animated series inspired by each song was also made. Later that year they released the live/cover album Tudo Vira Reggae.

Their fifth studio album, Caleidoscópico, came out on April 30, 2021.

In 2021, their song "Lágrimas de Alegria" (with Natiruts) was nominated for the Latin Grammy Award for Best Portuguese Language Song.

== Discography ==
=== Studio albums ===
- Maneva (2006, self-released)
- Tempo de Paz (2009, self-released)
- Teu Chão (2012, self-released)
- #SomosManeva (2015, self-released)
- Caleidoscópico (2021, UMG)

=== Live/video albums ===
- Maneva: 8 Anos (2013, self-released)
- Ao Vivo em São Paulo (2017, UMG)
- Acústico na Casa do Lago (2018, UMG)
- Tudo Vira Reggae (2020, UMG)

=== Extended plays ===
- Cinco Cabeças (2014, self-released)
- Maneva: Acústicas (2016, self-released)
- O Cabeça de Folha (2020, UMG)
