= Retratos da Humanidade =

Studio album by Revolucionnários
- Released: 2006
- Recorded: 2005–06
- Genre: Alternative rock; pop rock; reggae rock; funk rock; rap rock; rapcore; skate punk
- Length: 43:54
- Label: Champirado Records
- Producer: Tadeu Patolla

Singles from Retratos da Humanidade
- 1. "Revolucionnários" Released: 2005; 2. "Como num Sonho Perfeito" Released: 2006

Retratos da Humanidade (Portuguese for "Portraits of Mankind") is the only release by Brazilian alternative rock band Revolucionnários. It came out in 2006 through label Champirado Records, founded by vocalist and bassist Champignon (formerly of Charlie Brown Jr.), and distributed by Universal Music Group. Produced by Tadeu Patolla (who had also collaborated with Charlie Brown Jr. previously) and mastered by Rodrigo Castanho (famous for his work with bands such as CPM 22 and NX Zero), the album spawned the hit singles "Revolucionnários" and "Como num Sonho Perfeito", described by Champignon as a tribute to singer Rita Lee and her band Os Mutantes. A music video, which counted with a guest appearance by actress Karina Bacchi, was made for the latter. Also notable is the track "Natureza", written shortly after Champignon's falling-out with Chorão which prompted him to leave Charlie Brown Jr.

The album was well received by critics at the time of its release, awarding Champignon his second Multishow Brazilian Music Award in 2007 in the "Best Instrumentalist" category – he had previously won the award in 2004, while still with Charlie Brown Jr.

An alternate, acoustic version of "Como num Sonho Perfeito" was later uploaded to the band's official Myspace profile.

== Track listing ==
All tracks are written by Champignon.

No.	Title	English title	Length
1.	"Revolucionnários"	Revolutionnaries ^{[sic]}	2:47
2.	"Conceito de Aprendiz"	Concept of Apprenticeship	2:24
3.	"Psicomidialogia"	Psychomedialogy	3:41
4.	"Como num Sonho Perfeito"	Like in a Perfect Dream	3:42
5.	"A Nova Era de Aquarius"	The New Age of Aquarius	3:25
6.	"Fé sem Entidades"	Faith Without Entities	3:23
7.	"Faces da Humanidade"	Faces of Mankind	1:03
8.	"Por um Mundo Melhor"	For a Better World	3:26
9.	"Natureza"	Nature	3:42
10.	"Tow In"		2:04
11.	"Você"	You	4:03
12.	"Sedução"	Seduction	3:23
13.	"Viagem sem Volta"	One-Way Travel	4:03
14.	"Revolucionajazz" (instrumental)		2:42

== Personnel ==
- Champignon – vocals, beatboxing, bass guitar
- Nando Martins – electric guitar
- Pablo Silva – drums
- Fábio Kvêra – electric guitar
- Diego Righi – percussion
- Tadeu Patolla – production
- Rodrigo Castanho – mastering
