= Preço Curto... Prazo Longo =

Studio album by Charlie Brown Jr.
- Released: March 6, 1999
- Studio: Estúdio Midas
- Genre: Skate punk; rap rock; reggae
- Length: 64:06
- Label: Virgin Records
- Producer: Rick Bonadio, Tadeu Patolla

Charlie Brown Jr. chronology
| Transpiração Contínua Prolongada (1997) | Preço Curto... Prazo Longo (1999) | Nadando com os Tubarões (2000) |

Singles from Preço Curto... Prazo Longo
- 1. "Zóio de Lula" Released: April 1, 1999; 2. "Te Levar" Released: July 1999; 3. "Confisco" Released: October 1999; 4. "A Grande Volta" Released: February 2000; 5. "Não Deixe o Mar te Engolir" Released: September 2000

Professional ratings
Review scores
| Source | Rating |
|---|---|
| Galeria Musical | link |
| Correio da Cidadania | Favorable link |

Preço Curto... Prazo Longo (Portuguese for "Low Price... Long Time") is the second album by Brazilian rock band Charlie Brown Jr. Like its predecessor, it was released through Virgin Records on March 6, 1999, and produced by Rick Bonadio and Tadeu Patolla. Totaling 25 tracks, it is Charlie Brown Jr.'s longest studio album; in an interview, vocalist Chorão explained that Preço Curto... Prazo Longo was recorded out of necessity, so the band could have more repertoire for the set list of their shows. Six of the album's tracks had previously appeared as teasers in the promotional EP Aquele Luxo!, released some months prior.

It spawned five hit singles, the first of which being "Zóio de Lula", released on April 1, 1999. "Te Levar" was used as the opening theme of the long-running soap opera Malhação from 1999 to 2006. Guest musicians include rappers Radjja de Santos, P.MC and DJ Deco Murphy (who also appeared in Transpiração Contínua Prolongada); hip hop groups De Menos Crime, Consciência Humana and Homens Crânio; and then-Raimundos vocalist Rodolfo Abrantes. Explaining its cover art in 2020, photographer Shin Shikuma stated he took inspiration from the moai statues of Easter Island, in a sense to express "awe and eternity".

The album sold over 250,000 copies, receiving a Platinum certification by Pro-Música Brasil, and in 2000 was nominated for a Multishow Brazilian Music Award, in the "Best CD" category. Following the death of Chorão in 2013, it was re-released by EMI.

In 2020, the song "Confisco" was included in the soundtrack of the video game Tony Hawk's Pro Skater 1 + 2.

== Critical reception ==
Preço Curto... Prazo Longo received generally positive reviews upon its release. Writing for Correio da Cidadania, Leonardo Botti stated that "[I]f you're a fan of radical sports, is between 10–18 years old or simply enjoy a fun soundtrack for your days, this is the ideal CD. After all, rock 'n' roll is mainly about fun". Anderson Nascimento of Galeria Musical gave the album 3 out of 5 stars, praising its rap-inflected sonority but criticizing its length.

== Track listing ==
All lyrics are written by Chorão, except where noted.

| No. | Title | Lyrics | Music | English title | Length |
|---|---|---|---|---|---|
| 1. | "Confisco" | | Chorão, Marcão | Confiscation | 3:00 |
| 2. | "Zóio de Lula" | | Champignon, Chorão, Renato Pelado | Squid Eyes | 4:12 |
| 3. | "Resolve o Meu Problema Aí" | | Champignon, Marcão, Thiago Castanho | Solve My Problem | 2:59 |
| 4. | "Te Levar" | | Chorão | Take You Away | 3:04 |
| 5. | "O que É da Casa, É da Casa" | | Champignon | What Is of the Home, Is of the Home | 1:01 |
| 6. | "O Preço" | | Champignon | The Price | 3:30 |
| 7. | "Não Deixe o Mar te Engolir" | | Marcão | Don't Let the Sea Swallow You | 5:09 |
| 8. | "Hoje de Noite" | | Marcão | Tonight | 2:41 |
| 9. | "Bons Aliados" (feat. Rodolfo Abrantes) | Chorão, Abrantes | Champignon, Marcão | Great Allies | 2:24 |
| 10. | "Puxa-Carro" | | Marcão | Car Puller | 2:53 |
| 11. | "União" (feat. Radjja de Santos, De Menos Crime, Homens Crânio and Consciência Humana) | Radjja de Santos, Chorão, Homens Crânio, De Menos Crime, Consciência Humana | Champignon | Union | 2:59 |
| 12. | "Aquele Velho Carteado e Algumas Manobrinhas" | Chorão, Thron | Castanho | That Old Cardplay and Some Little Maneuvers | 2:35 |
| 13. | "333" | | Castanho | | 2:28 |
| 14. | "Mantenha a Dúvida e Espere Até Ouvir Falar de Nós" | | Champignon | Keep the Doubt and Wait Until You Hear from Us | 3:04 |
| 15. | "Do Surfe" | Instrumental | Marcão | Of Surfing | 1:55 |
| 16. | "História Mal Escrita" | | Castanho, Champignon, Chorão, Marcão, Pelado | Badly Written Story | 4:02 |
| 17. | "Chicanos (Skate nos Canos)" | | Champignon | Chicanos (Skating on the Pipes) | 1:24 |
| 18. | "A Grande Volta" | | Champignon, Chorão, Marcão | The Great Return | 2:29 |
| 19. | "Cruzei uma Doida" | | Chorão, Champignon | I Met a Madwoman | 1:45 |
| 20. | "12 + 1" (feat. P.MC) | Chorão, P.MC | Champignon | | 3:00 |
| 21. | "Cidade Grande" | | Castanho | Big City | 3:15 |
| 22. | "Local" | | Champignon, Marcão, Castanho | Place | 2:10 |
| 23. | "Muito Antes que Você" | | Castanho | Even Before You | 2:28 |
| 24. | "Depois de uma Bela Session, um Belo Sofá, Cerveja, Pizza e um Videozinho de Skate" | Instrumental | Marcão | After a Wonderful Session, a Wonderful Couch, Beer, Pizza and a Little Skateboarding Video | 1:07 |
| 25. | "Deu Entrada pra Subir!" | | Marcão | Entrance to Climb! | 3:08 |

== Personnel ==
Charlie Brown Jr.

- Chorão – vocals
- Champignon – bass guitar, beatboxing
- Thiago Castanho – guitar
- Marcão – guitar
- Renato Pelado – drums

Additional musicians

- De Menos Crime – vocals on "União"
- Radjja de Santos – vocals on "União"
- Consciência Humana – vocals on "União"
- Homens Crânio – vocals on "União"
- DJ Deco Murphy – scratches on "Confisco", "O Preço", "12 + 1" and "Deu Entrada pra Subir!"
- P.MC – vocals on "12 + 1"
- Tadeu Patolla – guitar on "333"
- Rodolfo Abrantes – vocals on "Bons Aliados"
- Munari – electric guitar in "Depois de uma Bela Session, um Belo Sofá, Cerveja, Pizza e um Videozinho de Skate"
- Zé Mazeo – guitar in "Depois de uma Bela Session, um Belo Sofá, Cerveja, Pizza e um Videozinho de Skate"

Production

- Rick Bonadio – production
- Tadeu Patolla – production
- Rick Bonadio, Paulo Anhaia and Lampadinha – recording
- Rick Bonadio and Paulo Anhaia – mixing
- Rick Bonadio and Rodrigo Castanho – mastering
- Paulo Anhaia and Tadeu Patolla – ProTools engineers
- Ronaldo Simolla, Sergio Panda and Ivan Dizioli – auxiliary technicians
- Edu and Flávio – roadies

Design

- Anselmo Gomes – diagramming
- Chorão – booklet illustration
- Shin Shikuma – photography
- Marcelo Rossi – concert photos, electronic editing
- Chorão, Marcelo Rossi and Shin Shikuma – graphic project

== Certifications ==
| Region | Certification | Certified units/sales |
|---|---|---|
| Brazil (Pro-Música Brasil) | Platinum | 250,000^{*} |
^{*} Sales figures based on certification alone.
