= Lavô Tá Novo =

Studio album by Raimundos
- Released: 1995
- Recorded: 1995
- Genre: Hardcore punk, alternative metal, forrocore
- Length: 35:30

Raimundos chronology
| Raimundos (1994) | Lavô Tá Novo (1995) | Cesta Básica (1996) |

Professional ratings
Review scores
| Source | Rating |
|---|---|
| Allmusic | link |

Lavô Tá Novo (transl. Washed and It Is New) is the second album by the Brazilian hardcore punk band Raimundos. It was released in 1995 through Warner Music, and its producer was Mark Dearnley, who had already worked with AC/DC, Black Sabbath and Def Leppard previously. The album was certified platinum. This album sold around five hundred thousand copies.

== Track listing ==
1. "Tora Tora"
2. "Eu Quero Ver o Oco"
3. "Opa! Peraí, Caceta"
4. "O Pão da Minha Prima"
5. "Pitando no Kombão"
6. "Bestinha"
7. "Esporrei na Manivela"
8. "Tá Querendo Desquitar (Ela Tá Dando)"
9. "Sereia da Pedreira"
10. "I Saw You Saying (That You Say That You Saw)"
11. "Cabeça de Bode"
12. "Herbocinética"

== Personnel ==
Raimundos

- Rodolfo - lead and background vocals, rhythm (lead on "O Pão da Minha Prima" and "I Saw You Saying") guitar, percussion on "Tá Querendo Desquitar"
- Digão - lead and rhythm guitar, percussion on "Tá Querendo Desquitar", background vocals (all except "Bestinha" and "Herbocinética"), co-lead vocals on "I Saw You Saying"
- Canisso - bass, background vocals on "Eu Quero Ver o Oco"
- Fred - drums

Additional musicians

- Rubão - vocal introduction on "Opa! Peraí, Caceta"
- TiquinhO, Hugo Hori, Marcelo - brass instruments on "Opa! Peraí, Caceta"
- Guilherme Bonolo - background vocals, percussion on "Tá Querendo Desquitar"
- Gabriel Thomaz - acoustic guitar and background vocals on "I Saw You Saying"
- Zenilton - accordion on "Esporrei na Manivela"; background vocals on "Esporrei na Manivela" and "Tá Querendo Desquitar"
- Betinho - percussion on "Tá Querendo Desquitar"
- Bruno - percussion on "Tá Querendo Desquitar"
- X - rapping on "Cabeça de Bode"
- Gibi - scratches on "Cabeça de Bode"

Production

- Mark Dearnley - production, recording, mixing
- Paulo Junqueiro - A&R
- Guilherme Bonolo - production assistant
- Silas, Rico - recording assistants
- Brian Young - mixing assistant
- Roberto da Paixão - roadie
- Fernando Conssentino - drum tech
- José Muniz Neto - manager
- Cristina Doria - general coordination
- Stephen Marcussen - mastering
