= Rodolfo Abrantes =

Brazilian hard rock singer (born 1972)

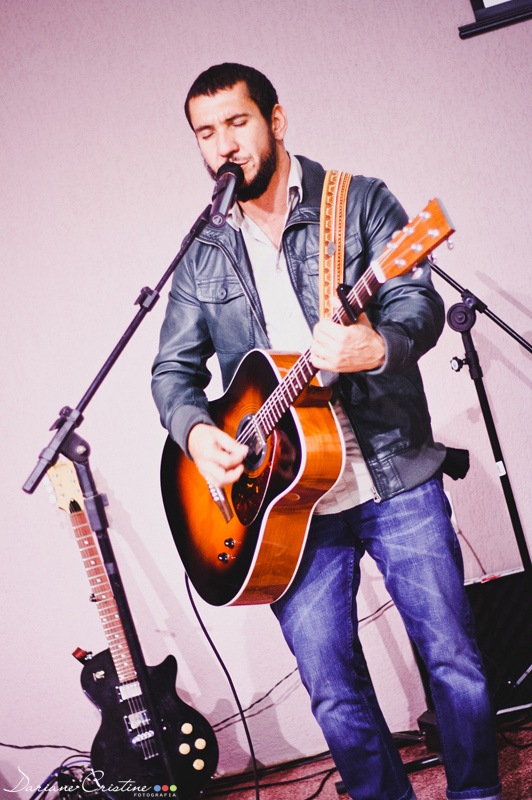

Background information
- Born: Rodolfo Gonçalves Leite de Abrantes; September 20, 1972 (age 53); Sobradinho, Federal District, Brazil
- Genres: Hardcore punk; punk rock; Christian rock; contemporary Christian
- Instruments: Vocals; guitar
- Years active: 1987–present
- Labels: Warner Music, independent
- Formerly of: Raimundos, Rodox

Rodolfo Gonçalves Leite de Abrantes (born September 20, 1972) is a Brazilian hard rock singer and electric guitar player. He was the vocalist and former leader of the Brazilian bands Raimundos and Rodox and now he is a solo gospel artist, as well as pastor and minister. Formerly atheist, he converted to Protestant Christianity.

== Discography ==
=== as part of Raimundos ===
Year	Album title	Certified
1994	Raimundos	Gold (180,000 copies)
1995	Lavô Tá Novo	Platinum (480,000 copies)
1996	Cesta Básica	Gold (210,000 copies)
1997	Lapadas do Povo	Gold (120,000 copies)
1999	Só no Forévis	Triple Platinum (1,850,000 copies)
2000	MTV ao Vivo (Raimundos)	Double Platinum (700,000 copies)

=== as part of Rodox ===
Year	Album title
2002	Estreito
2003	Rodox

=== Solo ===
Year	Album title
2006	Santidade ao Senhor
2007	Enquanto é dia
2010	Rodolfo Abrantes - Ao vivo
2012	R.A.B.T - Rompendo a Barreira do Templo

=== Other work ===
- Ando Jururu 1997, in partnership with Rita Lee on the album Santa Rita de Sampa
- Eu Sou Rebelde 1998, in partnership with Virgulóides on the album Só Pra Quem Tem Dinheiro?
- Bons Aliados 1999, in partnership with Charlie Brown Jr. on the album Preço Curto... Prazo Longo
- Homem do Povo 2001, in partnership with Natiruts on the album Verbalize
- Tira as Crianças da Sala 2002, in partnership with DJ Marcelinho on the album Riscando Um
- Santo Sangue, e Frenesi 2006, in partnership with Pregador Luo of Apocalipse 16.
- Nova Aurora of the band Strike on CD Nova Aurora - 2012.

== Videography ==
- (2013) Ele Continua o Mesmo
