= Só no Forevis =

Studio album by Raimundos
- Released: 1999
- Recorded: February – March 1999, in Estúdios AR e Mega, Rio de Janeiro
- Genres: Hardcore punk, alternative metal, punk rock
- Length: 42:06
- Label: Warner Music
- Producers: Tom Capone, Carlos Eduardo Miranda and Mauro Manzoli; Dzcuts ("Boca de Lata")

Raimundos chronology
Lapadas Do Povo (1997)	Só no Forevis (1999)	MTV Ao Vivo (2000)

Só no Forevis (transl. Only in the Butt) is the fourth studio album by Brazilian hard rock band Raimundos, launched in 1999. Its title makes a reference to the word forevis, used as a euphemism to buttocks, by Brazilian humorist Mussum from the Os Trapalhões troupe of comedians.

At 850 thousand copies sold, it is Raimundos' best selling album.

It was also the last studio album with vocalist Rodolfo Abrantes.

== Track listing ==
1. "Só no Forevis" (Only in the Ass) - 0:32
2. "Mato Véio" (Kill This Old Man) - 2:07
3. "Carrão de Dois" (Wagon for Two) - 2:01
4. "Fome do Cão" (Devil's Hunger) - 3:28
5. "Mulher de Fases" (Woman of Phases) - 3:32
6. "Alegria" (Joy) - 1:49
7. "A Mais Pedida" (The Top Requested) - 3:52
8. "Boca de Lata" (Metal Mouth) - 2:25
9. "Me Lambe" (Lick Me) - 3:16
10. "Pompem" (Pompoir) - 2:42
11. "Deixa Eu Falar" (Let Me Speak) - 4:41
12. "Aquela" (That One) - 3:24
13. "Língua Presa" (Lisp) - 1:39
14. "Mulher de Fases (A Linda)" (Woman of Phases (Pretty One)) - 3:58

== Personnel ==
Raimundos

- Rodolfo - vocals, percussion on "Só no Forevis", handclaps on "Pompem"
- Digão - guitar (all but 1), background vocals (all except 3 and 5), "fair vocals" on "Fome do Cão", small fiddle on "A Mais Pedida", acoustic guitar on "A Mais Pedida" and "Aquela"
- Canisso - bass (all but 9), background vocals (1, 2, 3, 6, 8, 10, 11, 12)
- Fred - drums, percussion and background vocals on "Só no Forevis", triangle on "Fome do Cão", handclaps on "Pompem"

Additional musicians/Special guests

- Guilherme Bonolo - background vocals (all but 8), "fair vocals" on "Fome do Cão", handclaps on "Pompem"
- Antônio, Marcelo D2 - vocals on "Só no Forevis"
- Tuka - cuíca and vocals on "Só no Forevis"
- Tom Capone - mandolin on "Só no Forevis", "fair vocals" on "Fome do Cão"
- Cheeba - burps on "Só no Forevis", background vocals (2)
- Plínio Gomes - background vocals on "Mato Véio"
- Wagner Vianna - background vocals on "Mato Véio", "Fome do Cão", "Boca de Lata" and "Língua Presa (intro)"
- Carlos Eduardo Miranda - "fair vocals" on "Fome do Cão"
- Duda Mello - "fair vocals" on "Fome do Cão", handclaps on "Pompem"
- Glauco Fernandes, Léo Ortiz, Isabela Noronha, Luis Fernando Zamith - strings on "Mulher de Fases"
- Martin Luthero - narrator and background vocals on "Alegria", concept ("Língua Presa" intro")
- Érika Martins - vocals on "A Mais Pedida"
- Rodrigo Nuts - scratches on "Boca de Lata"
- Zé Gonzales - scratches and background vocals on "Boca de Lata"
- Bi Ribeiro (Paralamas) - bass on "Me Lambe"
- Mauro Manzoli - handclaps on "Pompem"
- Black Alien (Planet Hemp) and Alexandre Carlo (Nativus) - vocals on "Deixa Eu Falar"
- Gabriel Thomáz (Autoramas) - background vocals on "Aquela"
- Los Djangos - background vocals on "Língua Presa (intro)"

Production

- Tom Capone - production (all but 8), mixing (all but 10)
- Carlos Eduardo Miranda - production (all but 8), mixing in "Pompem"
- Mauro Manzoli - production (all but 8), Pro Tools engineering
- Dzcuts (Rodrigo Nuts and Zé Gonzales) - production in "Boca de Lata"
- Fabiano França - recording, mixing
- David Corcos - mixing in "Boca de Lata"
- Ricardo Garcia - mastering
- Luciano Tarta, Duda Mello, Leo, Daniel, Isiel - studio assistants: AR Studios
- Max P.A, Marcito, Eduardo Pop - studio assistants: Mega
- Guilherme Bonolo - executive producer, Pro Tools engineering
- Luciano Tarta - production assistant
- Wagner Vianna - executive producer
- Roberto da Paixão - roadie

Design

- Luiz Stein - artwork, cover concept
- Raimundos - cover concept
- Adriana Pittigliani - photography
- Roberto da Paixão, Patrick Grossner, Marcelo Rossi - concert photos (booklet)
- Lily Clark - clothing
- Andrea Franco - production
- Victor Hugo Cecatto - image manipulation
- Karol Loureiro, Silvano Martins - photography assistants
- Celeste Randall - makeup
- Cristina Portella, Silvia Panella - graphic coordination
