= Camisa de Vênus =

Brazilian rock band

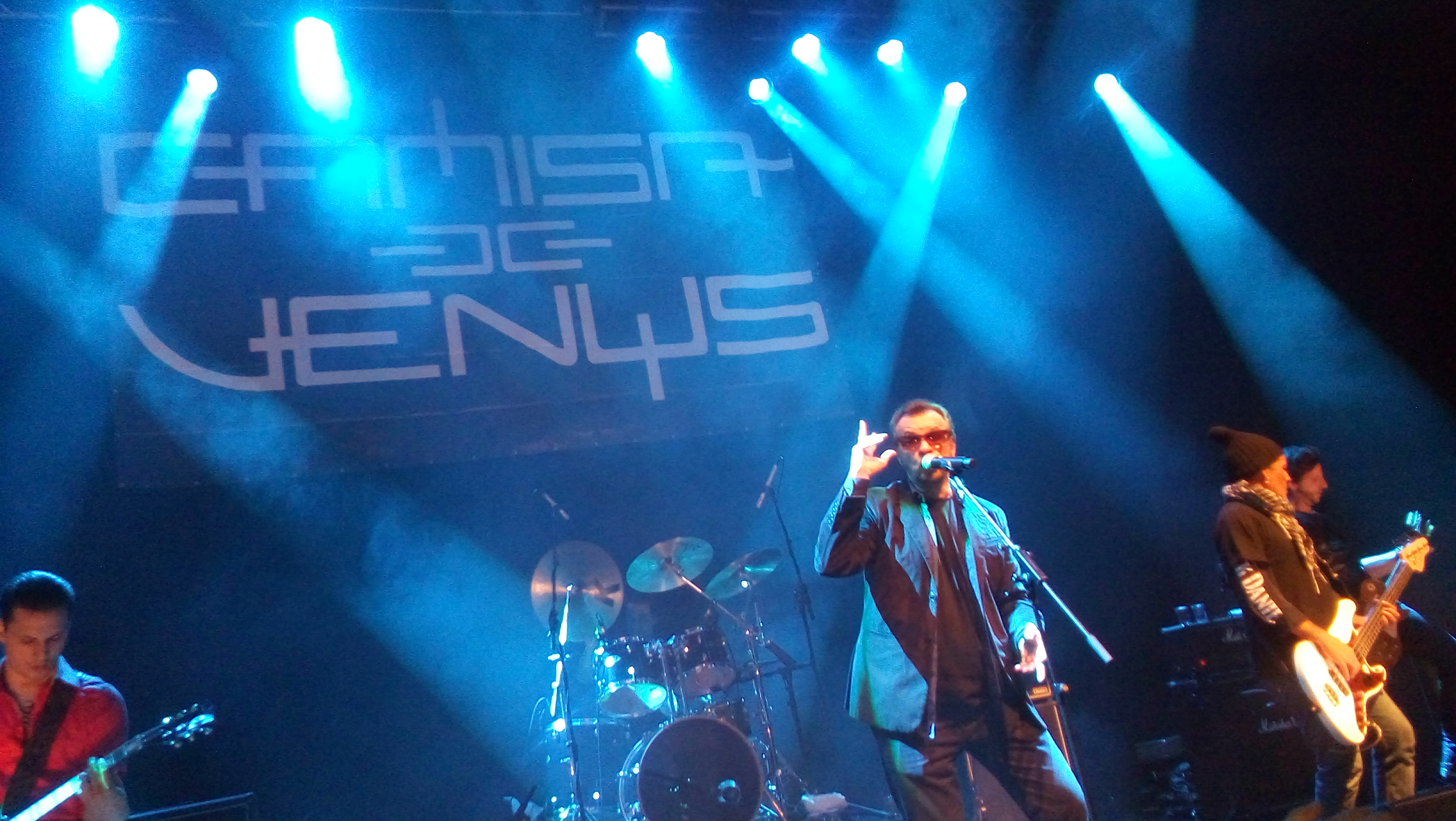

Background information
- Origin: Salvador, Bahia
- Genres: Punk rock, rockabilly, new wave
- Years active: 1982–1988, 1994–1997, 2009–present (reunions: 2004, 2007)
- Labels: Som Livre; RGE; Warner Music
- Members: Marcelo Nova; Karl Hummel; Gustavo Mullem; Jerry Marlon; Louis Bear; Robério Santana
- Past members: Aldo Machado; Carlos Alberto Calazans; Franklin Paolillo; Johnny Boy; Luis Sérgio Carlini; Lu Stopa; Eduardo Scott

Camisa de Vênus (the old-fashioned Portuguese term for "condom") was a Brazilian rock group from Bahia whose peak of popularity was in the mid-1980s. Former lead singer, Marcelo Nova would be the producer and partner of Raul Seixas in his last years. The band has made several comebacks for short tours but is now on tour in promotion of its new record “Dançando na Lua”.

== Early years ==
Camisa de Vênus was formed in 1982, in Salvador, Bahia with Marcelo Nova (vocals), Robério Santana (bass guitar), Karl Hummel (guitar) and Gustavo Mullem (drums). After watching the band live, André Midani (director of WEA) visited the band in the backstage and called their performance "an insult" - and then announced he wanted to take that insult to his label. He would say that he recorded "the first rupture of Brazilian music" (João Gilberto), the second one (Gilberto Gil and Caetano Veloso) and now he wanted the third (Camisa de Vênus). After the band made it to the mainstream, Gustavo picked the lead guitar and a new drummer, Aldo Machado, was hired. The band debuted in 1982 with a single ("Controle Total"/"Meu Primo Zé") featuring most of the band's hallmarks.

The first, namesake was a punk rock album, but drew media attention, especially for its shock value, with the song "Bete Morreu" (Beth Died) becoming an underground hit, and the group was invited to play on TV. In July 2016, this album was elected by Rolling Stone Brasil as the 7th best Brazilian punk rock album. They soon released a second album, Batalhões de Estranhos (Platoons of Strangers), which brought them their first mainstream hit: "Eu Não Matei Joana D'Arc" (I Didn't Kill Joan of Arc).

== Style ==
Musically, Camisa de Vênus draws more heavily from early rockers (like Chuck Berry) than their contemporaries, especially for the guitar style. They also bring the rhythm section forward, like in their major hit, "Simca Chambord", featuring an interesting bass/guitar interplay with massive, nonstopping and thumping drums. Marcelo Nova's vocals are deep, rascant, full of improvisation and notoriously freestyle, showing more interest on interpreting the lyrics' content than on following thoroughly the melody. Camisa de Vênus has got a punk rock influence too.

The lyrics are very mature, since the beginning, showing political attitude and critique of customs. They can also be quite offensive and explicit. When performing live the group used to point them with bad words for their shock value in a time when censorship still existed. Their lyrics touched sensitive points and made a great deal of noise in the eighties, especially "Eu Não Matei Joana D'Arc" (I Didn't Kill Joan of Arc), for its implicit allusions to free love and lesbianism, "Sílvia", the first time ever the word "puta" (whore) was heard on a record, "Passamos por Isso" (We've Been Through That), which protests against the recording industry, and "Pronto Pro Suicídio" (Ready For Suicide), a nihilist protest.

== The heyday ==
After three years touring and composing, the group had reached a level of maturity that most other Brazilian rock groups had only dreamt of. In 1986 they issued Viva! (Live!) -- maybe the first true "live" album by a Brazilian artist, without any post-production, edition or overdubs. This record showed to the country the band's true face: punkish, dirty and noisy. It is also famous for the use of several explicit words that had been censored in the original studio versions. "Eu Não Matei Joana D'Arc", for instance had the line "Nós só nos encontramos para passear no parque" (we only met to walk through the park) replaced by "Nós só nos encontramos para trepar no parque" (we only met to fuck in the park).

That same year they issued Correndo o Risco (Taking the Risk), their most successful album ever, with the hits "Só O Fim" (Just The End), "Simca Chambord", "Deus me Dê Grana" (God Give Me Money) and "A Ferro e Fogo" (By Iron and Fire) -- their only recording with a live orchestra (!), something quite unusual given their style.

However the band would not last long. In 1987, after a mild reception of their fifth album, Duplo Sentido (Double Meaning), the band split.

== Marcelo Nova and Raul Seixas ==
Marcelo Nova chose to work with Raul Seixas—who had previously jammed with Camisa de Vênus and composed with them their hit "Muita Estrela, Pouca Constelação" (Too Many Stars, Too Few Constellations) from the album "Duplo Sentido".

They produced a quite underrated album called A Panela do Diabo (Devil's Saucepan) which is mostly famous for being Seixas' last recording in life. Raul was actually quite ill then and their live performances were pitiful, with Raul babbling the words and unable to play his guitar. He would die shortly after, supposedly of cirrhosis, but he also had diabetes and had been addicted to several drugs and to alcohol for years.

== The comeback ==
In 1995 Marcelo Nova and some of the original members reformed the band for a successful country-wide tour, captured in Plugado! (Plugged!), that same year.

Their comeback benefitted from their label promoting them steadily through the years, issuing two compilations, Liberou Geral (All Free), in 1988, and Bota Pra Fudê (Let's F**k It All Up), in 1990.

In 1996 they released Quem É Você? (Who Are You?), with Marcelo Nova, Karl Hummel, Robério Santana, Luiz Carlini, Frank Paolillo and Carlos Calazans, notably co-produced by Eric Burdon, who also made a guest appearance in the album singing along with Nova in the band's version of "Don't Let Me Be Misunderstood". Despite good reviews, this was their last effort together (so far).

== Legacy ==
Camisa de Vênus played an important role during the last days of the Brazilian dictatorship by ridiculing censorship and introducing clever criticism of the customs of pop music. Marcelo Nova was also responsible for keeping Raul Seixas visible in the media in his last days, which helped revalue his work after his death.

Karl Franz Hummel died of liver cancer in June 2017; Gustavo Mullem died on 28 May 2024, aged 72, after suffering from lung cancer.

== Famous Hits ==
- "Eu Não Matei Joana D'Arc"—A kind of a "spy story": a young man is charged with the murder of a young woman whose burnt corpse has been found in a park. He blames the CIA, the KGB and the Catholic Church.
- "Simca Chambord"—A young man recalls his childhood, before the 1964 coup d'état, (when his father had a Simca Chambord car) and blames the armed forces for crushing his childhood dreams.
- "Passamos Por Isso"—A singer tells the story of his band, and all trials and tribulations they had to overcome to be "allowed" to play rock and roll instead of MPB.
- "Lena"—A man scolds his ex-girlfriend, now a prostitute who "works" with famous men.
- "Só O Fim"—A prophet preaches in the streets that social tension and stress are symptoms that the end of the world is near.
- "Homem Não Chora"—A dark tale of the common man - Badly parented, misguided by catholic school, working the hours, waiting for the pension... But still got to remember what he was taught - "Homem não chora" (Men don't cry).

== Records ==
- Controle Total ("Total Control" (EP)) — 1983
- Camisa de Vênus ("Camisa de Vênus") — 1983
- Batalhões de Estranhos ("Battalions of Strangers") — 1984
- Viva ("Live") — 1986
- Correndo o Risco ("Taking the Risks") — 1986
- Duplo Sentido ("Double Meaning") — 1987
- Liberou Geral ("Released General" (compilation)) -- 1988
- Bota Pra Fudê ("Fuck it Up" (compilation)) -- 1990
- Plugado! ("Plugged In") — 1995
- Quem é Você? ("Who Are You?") — 1996
- Dançando na Lua ("Dancing on the Moon") — 2016
- Agulha no Palheiro ("Needle in the Haystack") — 2021
