= Nadando com os Tubarões =

Studio album by Charlie Brown Jr.
- Released: November 2000
- Genre: Alternative rock, rap rock, skate punk, funk rock, reggae rock
- Length: 53:24
- Label: Virgin Records
- Producer: Tadeu Patolla, Charlie Brown Jr.

Charlie Brown Jr. chronology
Preço Curto... Prazo Longo (1999)	Nadando com os Tubarões (2000)	Abalando a Sua Fábrica (2001)

Singles from Nadando com os Tubarões
- 1. "Rubão, o Dono do Mundo" Released: December 2000; 2. "Não É Sério" Released: March 2001; 3. "Tudo Mudar" Released: 2001; 4. "Ralé" Released: 2001

Professional ratings
Review scores
Source	Rating
Galeria Musical	link

Nadando com os Tubarões (Portuguese for "Swimming Alongside the Sharks") is the third album by Brazilian alternative rock band Charlie Brown Jr., released in November 2000 through Virgin Records. It was the band's final album with original guitarist Thiago Castanho, who left the following year citing his dissatisfaction with their extensive touring schedule; however, he would return in 2005.

The album counts with guest appearances by hip hop groups Controlamente, RZO – at the time still fronted by Sabotage – and De Menos Crime, returning from Preço Curto... Prazo Longo; and rappers Negra Li – who wrote the lyrics of the hit "Não É Sério" – and Radjja de Santos, another previous collaborator. Producer Tadeu Patolla was also a co-author of "O Penetra".

Nadando com os Tubarões sold over 100,000 copies, receiving a Gold certification by Pro-Música Brasil, and in 2001 was nominated for both a Latin Grammy Award for Best Portuguese Language Rock or Alternative Album and a Multishow Brazilian Music Award. A music video which counted with a guest appearance by comedy troupe Hermes & Renato was made for "Rubão, o Dono do Mundo".

== Critical reception ==
Writing for Galeria Musical, Anderson Nascimento gave the album a negative review, rating it with 2 stars out of 5. He claimed that, while the album is "heavier" than its predecessors, overall it seems "rushed" and "unfinished". Nevertheless, he praised the tracks "Rubão, o Dono do Mundo", "Não É Sério", "O Penetra" and "Tudo Mudar".

== Track listing ==
All lyrics are written by Chorão, except where noted

No.	Title	Lyrics	Music	English title	Length
1.	"Rubão, o Dono do Mundo"		Marcão	Rubão, the Owner of the World	2:17
2.	"Ralé" (feat. Controlamente)		Chorão	Scum	3:15
3.	"Não É Sério" (feat. Negra Li)	Chorão, Negra Li	Champignon, Chorão, Renato Pelado	It Isn't Serious	4:50
4.	"O Penetra"		Tadeu Patolla, Thiago Castanho	The Gatecrasher	3:14
5.	"A Banca" (feat. RZO)	Chorão, Sabotage	Charlie Brown Jr., RZO	The Stand	5:53
6.	"Tudo Mudar"		Castanho	For Everything to Change	2:13
7.	"Fichado"		Marcão	Filed	3:08
8.	"Ouviu-se Falar"		Champignon	Heard People Say	3:12
9.	"Amor pelas Ruas"	Instrumental	Champignon	Love Around the Streets	1:57
10.	"Essa É por Quem Ficou pra Trás"		Castanho	This One's for Who Stayed Behind	3:37
11.	"Transar no Escuro"		Marcão	Having Sex in the Dark	3:03
12.	"Fundão"	Instrumental	Champignon	The Back Gang	1:57
13.	"Somos Extremes no Esporte e na Música" (feat. De Menos Crime and Controlamente)	Chorão, Mikimba	Champignon	We're Extreme Both in Sports and in Music	4:31
14.	"Talvez a Metade do Caminho"		Champignon	Maybe Halfway There	3:01
15.	"Pra Mais Tarde Fazermos a Cabeça"	Chorão, Champignon	Champignon	For Us to Make Our Minds Later On	3:01
16.	"No Desafio, Ibiraboys/A União Prevalece" (feat. Mikimba and Radjja de Santos)	Chorão, Mikimba, Radjja de Santos	Champignon, Chorão, Mikimba, Radjja de Santos	Up to the Challenge, Ibiraboys/Union Prevails	3:50
17.	"Trocando uma Ideia com Deus"	Instrumental	Chorão	Chatting with God a Little Bit	3:05

== Personnel ==
Charlie Brown Jr.

- Chorão – vocals
- Champignon – bass guitar, backing vocals (on "Pra Mais Tarde Fazermos a Cabeça"), beatboxing
- Thiago Castanho – rhythm and lead guitar
- Marcão – lead and rhythm guitar
- Renato Pelado – drums

Additional musicians

- DJ Anderson Franja – scratches in "Ralé" and "Pra Mais Tarde Fazermos a Cabeça"
- Controlamente – additional vocals in "Ralé"
- De Menos Crime – vocals in "Somos Extremes no Esporte e na Música"
- Radjja de Santos – vocals in "No Desafio, Ibiraboys/A União Prevalece"
- Mikimba – vocals in "No Desafio, Ibiraboys/A União Prevalece"
- RZO – additional vocals in "A Banca"
- Negra Li – additional vocals in "Não É Sério"
- Maestro Mojica – trumpet in "Ralé"
- Tadeu Patolla – electric guitar in "O Penetra"

Production

- Charlie Brown Jr. – production
- Tadeu Patolla – production
- Paulo Anhaia – recording and mixing
- Rodrigo Castanho – mastering
- Paulo Anhaia and Lampadinha – ProTools engineers
- Lampadinha – additional cuts
- Marcelo Bacará, Nilton Baloni and Renato Patriarca – recording assistants
