= Revolucionnários =

Brazilian alternative rock group

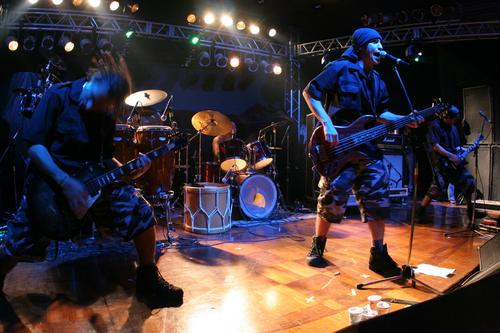
- The band performing in 2006

Background information
- Origin: Santos, São Paulo, Brazil
- Genres: Alternative rock; rap rock; funk rock; reggae rock; skate punk; pop rock; rapcore
- Years active: 2005–2008
- Label: Champirado Records
- Past members: Champignon; Nando Martins; Pablo Silva; Fábio Kvêra; Diego Righi; André Fonseca

Revolucionnários (Portuguese for "Revolutionnaries" [sic]) was a Brazilian rock band from Santos, São Paulo.

== History ==
After parting ways with his former band Charlie Brown Jr. in 2005 amid a series of creative divergences and clashes with vocalist Chorão, bassist Champignon formed Revolucionnários soon after, claiming it was always a dream of his having his own side project to Charlie Brown Jr. in which he could have more creative control over the songwriting process. Thus, he dubbed his band "Revolucionnários" because he intended to "revolutionize his life" with this new endeavor; the double "N" alludes to a numerology map made by the mother of a friend of Champignon. Drummer Pablo Silva, son of famous percussionist Robertinho Silva, was a long-time friend of Champignon, and was the first to join the band; guitarist Nando Martins lived in the same condo as Champignon, and was invited by him after they chatted in the elevator. In his turn, Nando invited his friend Diego Righi as percussionist. André Fonseca was originally called to be the second guitarist, but due to other commitments his stay was brief and he was subsequently replaced by Fábio Kvêra.

In 2006 the band released its only album, Retratos da Humanidade, through Champignon's label Champirado Records. Produced by Tadeu Patolla, who had worked with Charlie Brown Jr. previously as well, it spawned the hit singles "Revolucionnários" and "Como num Sonho Perfeito", described by Champignon as a tribute to singer Rita Lee and her band Os Mutantes. Also notable was the track "Natureza", written shortly after his falling-out with Chorão. The album was well received by the critics, awarding Champignon his second Multishow Brazilian Music Award in 2007 in the "Best Instrumentalist" category – he had previously won the award in 2004, while still with Charlie Brown Jr..

Despite their blossoming success and the fact that Champignon even planned a second studio album for the band at some point, they broke up in 2008. After a brief stint with the short-lived Nove Mil Anjos, Champignon re-joined Charlie Brown Jr. in 2011, staying until its break-up in 2013 caused by Chorão's death due to a cocaine overdose. He then formed the tribute act A Banca, but eventually committed suicide on September 9, 2013. Victor Panchorra, the band's former manager, stated on an interview shortly after Champignon's suicide that he thought Revolucionnários did not last long because Champignon was "hasty", and "spent money without thinking aiming for success", what lead him to have financial problems after his departure from Charlie Brown Jr.; a view also shared by his former Nove Mil Anjos bandmate Perí Carpigiani.

In 2016, the band received an honorable mention on website Blog n' Roll's list of the Top 100 Greatest Bands of the Baixada Santista.

== Discography ==
=== Studio album ===
- (2006) Retratos da Humanidade

== Members ==
=== Last line-up ===
- Champignon: vocals, beatboxing, bass guitar (2005–2008; died 2013)
- Nando Martins: electric guitar (2005–2008)
- Pablo Silva: drums (2005–2008)
- Fábio Kvêra: electric guitar (2005–2008)
- Diego Righi: percussion (2005–2008)

=== Former members ===
- André Fonseca: electric guitar (2005)
