= Ela Vai Voltar (Todos os Defeitos de uma Mulher Perfeita) =

2005 song by Charlie Brown Jr.

Single by Charlie Brown Jr.

from the album Imunidade Musical
- Released: March 2006
- Genre: Rap rock
- Length: 3:30
- Label: EMI Music
- Composers: Chorão, Thiago Castanho
- Producer: Rick Bonadio

Charlie Brown Jr. singles chronology
"Pra Não Dizer que Não Falei das Flores" (February 2006)	"Ela Vai Voltar (Todos os Defeitos de uma Mulher Perfeita)" (2006)	"Senhor do Tempo" (August 2006)

Music video
- "Ela Vai Voltar (Todos os Defeitos de uma Mulher Perfeita)" on YouTube

Ela Vai Voltar (Todos os Defeitos de uma Mulher Perfeita) (Portuguese for "She'll Be Back (All the Defects of a Perfect Woman)") is a single by the Brazilian rock band Charlie Brown Jr., this song ended up selling more than 50 million paid Download in Brazil and received a Gold certification by ABPD, this song ended up being one of the biggest success of the band in the 2000s.

== ITunes Brazil ==
After the dead of Chorão, Ela Vai Voltar (Todos os Defeitos de uma Mulher Perfeita) was placing number four between the most fast selling songs of the week in ITunes Brazil.

== In popular culture ==
- in 2013, this song was feature to the soundtrack of the TV Series Malhação.

== Accolades ==
Awards and nominations for "Ela Vai Voltar"
Organization	Year	Category	Result	Ref.
MTV Video Music Brasil	2006	Melhor Videoclipe (Escolha da Audiência)	Nominated	
MTV Video Music Brasil	2006	Melhor Videoclipe de Rock	Nominated	
MTV Video Music Brasil	2006	Melhor Direção de Arte	Nominated	
Meus Prêmios Nick	2006	Best Song of the Year	Nominated	
Meus Prêmios Nick	2006	Best Music Video of the Year	Won	

== Certifications ==
Certifications for "Ela Vai Voltar (Todos os Defeitos de uma Mulher Perfeita)"
Region	Certification	Certified units/sales
Brazil (Pro-Música Brasil)	Diamond	500,000^{‡}
^{‡} Sales+streaming figures based on certification alone.
