= Geraldo Vandré =

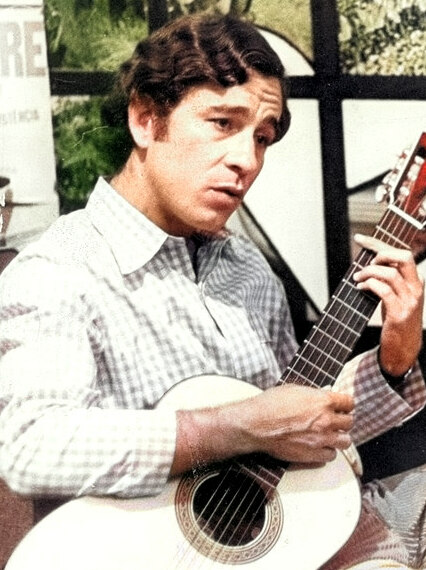
- Vandré in 1968

Background information
- Also known as: Geraldo Vandré
- Born: Geraldo Pedrosa de Araújo Dias; September 12, 1935 (age 90)
- Origin: João Pessoa, Paraíba, Brazil
- Genres: Música popular brasileira, bossa nova
- Occupations: Singer, songwriter, poet, guitarist, advocate
- Instruments: Vocals, guitar
- Years active: 1964–present
- Labels: Audio Fidelity, Continental, Som Maior, Odeon, Banco Benvirá, Phonogram, RGE Fermata

Geraldo Vandré (born Geraldo Pedrosa de Araujo Dias, September 12, 1935) is a Brazilian singer, composer and guitar player.

In 1966, his song Disparada ("Gone Off"), interpreted by Jair Rodrigues, was a success at the Record Festival. The song rose to number one, tied with Chico Buarque's "A banda".

Later in 1966, the group Quarteto Novo was created to accompany him in concert and on recordings and released a landmark album in 1967.

In 1968, Vandre entered his song "Pra não dizer que não falei de flores", also known as "Caminhando" ("Walking"), in the third Festival Internacional da Canção. The song had the following refrain:

Come, let's go
Cause to wait is not to know
Those who know choose the time
They don't wait for it to happen

This was thought to be a call to fight the dictatorship in charge. The song lost to "Sabiá" by Chico Buarque and Tom Jobim. Also in 1968, still with the AI-5, Vandré had to go into exile. The first artist ever to sing "Caminhando" after censorship's lift was Simone in 1979, reaching enormous success from both public and critics.

First he stayed at the farm of the late Guimarães Rosa, who had died the previous year, then he proceeded to Chile, and finally to France.

Since returning to Brazil in 1973, Vandré has been living and composing in São Paulo. He discounts rumors that he has been tortured, or that he was an anti-militarist, saying that this image was fabricated. One of his recent songs has been "Fabiana", written in honor of the Brazilian Air Force (Força Aérea Brasileira – FAB) and presented at the São Paulo Municipal Library some time in the 1990s.

== Discography ==
- 1964: Geraldo Vandré
- 1965: Hora de Lutar
- 1966: 5 Anos de canção
- 1968: Canto Geral
- 1973: Das Terras de Benvirá
