= Pra Não Dizer que Não Falei das Flores =

"Pra não dizer que não falei das flores"

Song by Geraldo Vandré
- Released: 1968
- Length: 6:49

"Pra não dizer que não falei das flores" (Portuguese for "Not to say that I haven't spoken about the flowers"), also known as "Caminhando" (Portuguese for "Walking" or "Going forward"), is a song composed by Geraldo Vandré that ranked second in the third Festival Internacional da Canção in 1968. Although it was the most applauded song of the night and very well received by the public, the music did not guarantee to Vandré the prize thanks to orders given the station Rede Globo by the first Army command who condemned the composition because they considered it extremely critical of the government. The first place prize went to the song "Sabiá" (Portuguese for "Thrush") of Tom Jobim and Chico Buarque; the authors ended up being booed for about 23 minutes while the people continued to sing Vandré's song. Considered a violation of the sovereignty of the country and a mockery of the armed forces, public playing of the song was forbidden by the Brazilian military dictatorship the following day along with the edition of AI-5, and the composer had become one of the most hunted persons in the country. The general Luís de Oliveira França, Security Secretary, warned that the music would serve as a slogan for the street manifestations hereafter. All the registers of Vandré's presentation at the festival were deleted.

== Structure ==
The melody has a hymn and march rhythm, and the lyric, with the verses in an easy rhyme scheme (almost all of them end with the same syllable: "ão", sounding like "oun" from the word "sound" and equivalent to "on" from "nation" in English), to aid memorization, was widely played.

== Content ==
The content of the song was seen as an incentive to resistance and the armed struggle thanks to some verses as:

"In schools, on the streets

Fields, buildings

We are all soldiers

Armed or not"

"Certainty in front

History at hand"

"Who knows makes the time

Doesn't wait for it to happen"

Also, the song was considered an affront by the government, mainly at the part that Vandré refers to the "old lesson" that was taught in the barracks; something that was also seen as a reference to the torture inflicted for those accused of subversion, the suspects were commonly taken to police stations and military institutions and were subjected to all kinds of abuse that often ended up victimizing them.

== Military opinion ==
One of the best known critiques of the time came from colonel Octavio Costa, whose article "As flores do Vandré" ('Vandré's flowers') spoke against the public and the singer that won the second place. At the end of the article, he noted that three injustices were committed that night - one by the jury, one by the public and the last one by Vandré - and added, menacingly, that "there is still time to fix it."

After these events, Vandré was persecuted.

== Legacy ==
One of the most important Brazilian songs and an everlasting symbol of the resistance, Caminhando is regarded by many as the true Brazilian national hymn. Writer and journalist Millôr Fernandes supports this hypothesis, saying that it was born during the fight and came being sung emotionally and in a spontaneous way by a large number of people.

Walking is still used to remember the situation that the country was going through at the time and to keep alive the memories of those who were victims of those hard times as occurred recently in the burial of Antônio Carlos Bicalho Lana, a 24-year-old student and one of the leaders of major resistance group ALN, killed under torture by army officers in 1973.

Artists such as Luiz Gonzaga and Zé Ramalho re-recorded the song that was also voted by the Brazilian edition of Rolling Stone as the 28th greatest Brazilian song.

== See also ==
- List of Brazilian musicians
