= TH6 =

Brazilian alternative rock group

- Origin: Santos, São Paulo, Brazil
- Genres: Alternative rock; rap rock; funk rock; pop rock; nu metal; hardcore punk
- Years active: 2005–2010
- Past members: Marcão; Tite Martins; Filipe Costa; Lenon Scarpa; Juninho

TH6 was a Brazilian alternative rock band from Santos, São Paulo.

== History ==
Following his departure from his previous band Charlie Brown Jr. in 2005 amid numerous creative divergences and clashes with vocalist Chorão, former guitarist Marcão decided that he wanted to continue pursuing musical projects, and after a brief hiatus gathered with long-time friend Juninho (with whom he had played in a band prior to Charlie Brown Jr.'s existence), Filipe Costa and Tite Martins to form a project. In an interview he would explain that the band's name was an allusion to the fact that one of their first rehearsals happened on a Thursday the 6th, and that it would be "catchy and easy to remember".

Around 2007 the group began working on their first songs, uploading them on their official Myspace profile; in less than three months, all songs reached over 400,000 downloads combined. Shortly afterwards they announced they would be releasing their first album, and the replacement of original bassist Juninho by Lenon Scarpa.

Contra Insetos Parasitas ultimately came out on July 28, 2008, initially through their Myspace page, and physically on October 14. Produced by Marcão alongside frequent Charlie Brown Jr. collaborator Tadeu Patolla, the album was positively received and counted with guest appearances by members of bands such as Detonautas Roque Clube, Tihuana, CPM 22 and NX Zero. The band later came to elaborate that originally over 40 songs were recorded for the album, but only 25 were chosen; two of those outtakes were later posted on their Myspace as well.

Following the birth of his son Gabriel, Marcão announced in 2010 that the band would be on hiatus; however, in 2011 he was invited to rejoin Charlie Brown Jr., and following its end due to the death of Chorão he became part of the projects A Banca and Bula, leaving TH6's fate unknown. In 2015 their vocalist Tite Martins announced that the band would be returning (albeit without Marcão), but since then no further announcements were given.

== Discography ==
=== Studio album ===
Year	Album
2008	Contra Insetos Parasitas: Label: Self-released; Format: CD

== Members ==
=== Last line-up ===
- Marcão – vocals, electric guitar (2005–2010)
- Tite Martins – lead vocals (2005–2010)
- Filipe Costa – drums (2005–2010)
- Lenon Scarpa – bass guitar, backing vocals (2007–2010)

=== Former members ===
- Juninho – bass guitar (2005–2007)
