= Renato Pelado =

Brazilian drummer and DJ (born 1965)

- Birth name: Renato Peres Barrio
- Born: March 5, 1965 (age 60); Santos, São Paulo, Brazil
- Genres: Alternative rock, pop rock, rap rock, reggae rock, death metal
- Occupation(s): Drummer, DJ
- Instrument: Drums
- Years active: 1980–present

Renato Peres Barrio (born March 5, 1965), better known by his stage name Renato Pelado, is a Brazilian drummer and DJ best known for being a founding member of the famous alternative rock band Charlie Brown Jr. and for his brief passage in the influential black/death metal group Vulcano.

== Biography ==
Renato Peres Barrio was born in Santos, São Paulo on March 5, 1965. He learned how to play the drums inspired by one of his greatest idols, Neil Peart, and began his musical career in 1980, subsequently playing in hardcore punk band Last Joker, where he met his future Charlie Brown Jr. bandmate Marcão. For a brief time in 1984 he was a member of Vulcano, taking part in the recording of their demo tape Devil on My Roof.

In 1992 he was invited by Chorão to be a member of his band What's Up, which later evolved to become Charlie Brown Jr. Pelado stayed with the band until 2005, recording six critically acclaimed studio albums, when creative divergences and clashes with Chorão prompted his departure alongside other members Champignon and Marcão. Pelado and Chorão were never able to make amends, and never spoke to each other again. Nevertheless, following Chorão's death on March 6, 2013, owing to a cocaine overdose, Pelado attended his funeral; he claimed that he initially didn't believe the news of his death, thinking it was a prank.

Following his departure from Charlie Brown Jr., Pelado began working as a disc jockey in nightclubs, and in 2008 was a guest musician on the only album by his former bandmate Marcão's band TH6, Contra Insetos Parasitas. At some point in 2013 following Chorão's death he converted to Evangelicalism by attending a cult at a Bola de Neve Church, and commenting on the suicide of Champignon on September 9, claimed that "his life lacked God".

In late 2019 he made a series of travels around Brazil, lecturing in schools, churches and rehabilitation clinics about how he overcame his depression and substance abuse through God.

== Discography ==
=== Charlie Brown Jr. ===
- (1997) Transpiração Contínua Prolongada
- (1999) Preço Curto... Prazo Longo
- (2000) Nadando com os Tubarões
- (2001) Abalando a Sua Fábrica
- (2002) Bocas Ordinárias
- (2003) Acústico MTV: Charlie Brown Jr.
- (2004) Tamo Aí na Atividade
