= Istoé =

Brazilian weekly news magazine founded in 1976

- Executive editors: Antonio Carlos Prado, Eduardo Marini and Marco Damiani
- Categories: News magazine
- Frequency: Weekly
- Publisher: Editora Três
- First issue: May 1976
- Country: Brazil
- Based in: São Paulo
- Language: Portuguese
- Website: Istoe.com.br
- ISSN: 0104-3943

IstoÉ (Brazilian Portuguese pronunciation: [ˌistuˈɛ]; lit. 'That is, In other words'; often stylized ISTO É) is a weekly news magazine in Portuguese published in Brazil, roughly the equivalent of the American magazines Time or Newsweek.

== History ==
The magazine was established in 1976. It is published weekly by Editora Três on Saturdays. It is considered one of the three main magazines being published in the country, along with Veja and Época.

== Circulation ==
In 2003 the circulation of IstoÉ was 362,307 copies.
