= Champignon (musician) =

Brazilian musician (1978–2013)

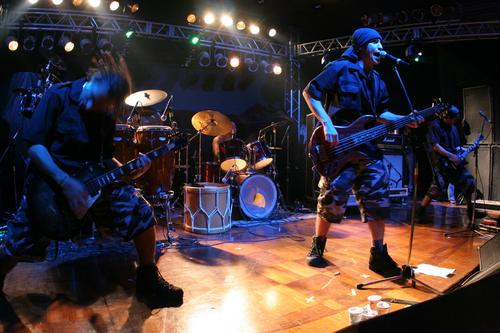
- Champignon (center) performing with Revolucionnários in 2006
- Born: Luiz Carlos Leão Duarte Júnior; June 16, 1978; Santos, São Paulo, Brazil
- Died: September 9, 2013 (aged 35); São Paulo, São Paulo, Brazil
- Resting place: Ecumenical Necropolis Memorial Cemetery, Santos, São Paulo, Brazil
- Occupations: Singer-songwriter, bassist, drummer, beatboxer
- Years active: 1990–2013
- Spouse(s): Nicole Mecatti (divorced) Claudia Bossle (m. 2012)
- Children: 2
- Musical career
- Genres: Alternative rock, pop rock, rap rock, funk rock, skate punk, reggae rock
- Instruments: Vocals, bass guitar, drum kit

Luiz Carlos Leão Duarte Júnior (June 16, 1978 – September 9, 2013), better known by his stage name Champignon and also referred to affectionately as Champ or Champs by fans, was a Brazilian singer-songwriter, lyricist, bassist, beatboxer, record label owner and drummer famous for his work with bands Charlie Brown Jr., Revolucionnários, Nove Mil Anjos and A Banca. Music critic Hagamenon Brito considered him one of the three greatest Brazilian pop rock bassists of all time alongside Paulo Roberto Diniz "PJ" Júnior of Jota Quest and Alexandre Dengue of Nação Zumbi, and Emir Ruivo of webzine El Hombre compared him to Red Hot Chili Peppers' Flea. Shortly after his death in 2013, caused by a self-inflicted gunshot wound following increasing bouts of anxiety and depression, he was featured in entertainment website Punk Brega's list of the Top 10 Greatest Brazilian Rock Bassists of All Time, in 10th place.

== Biography ==
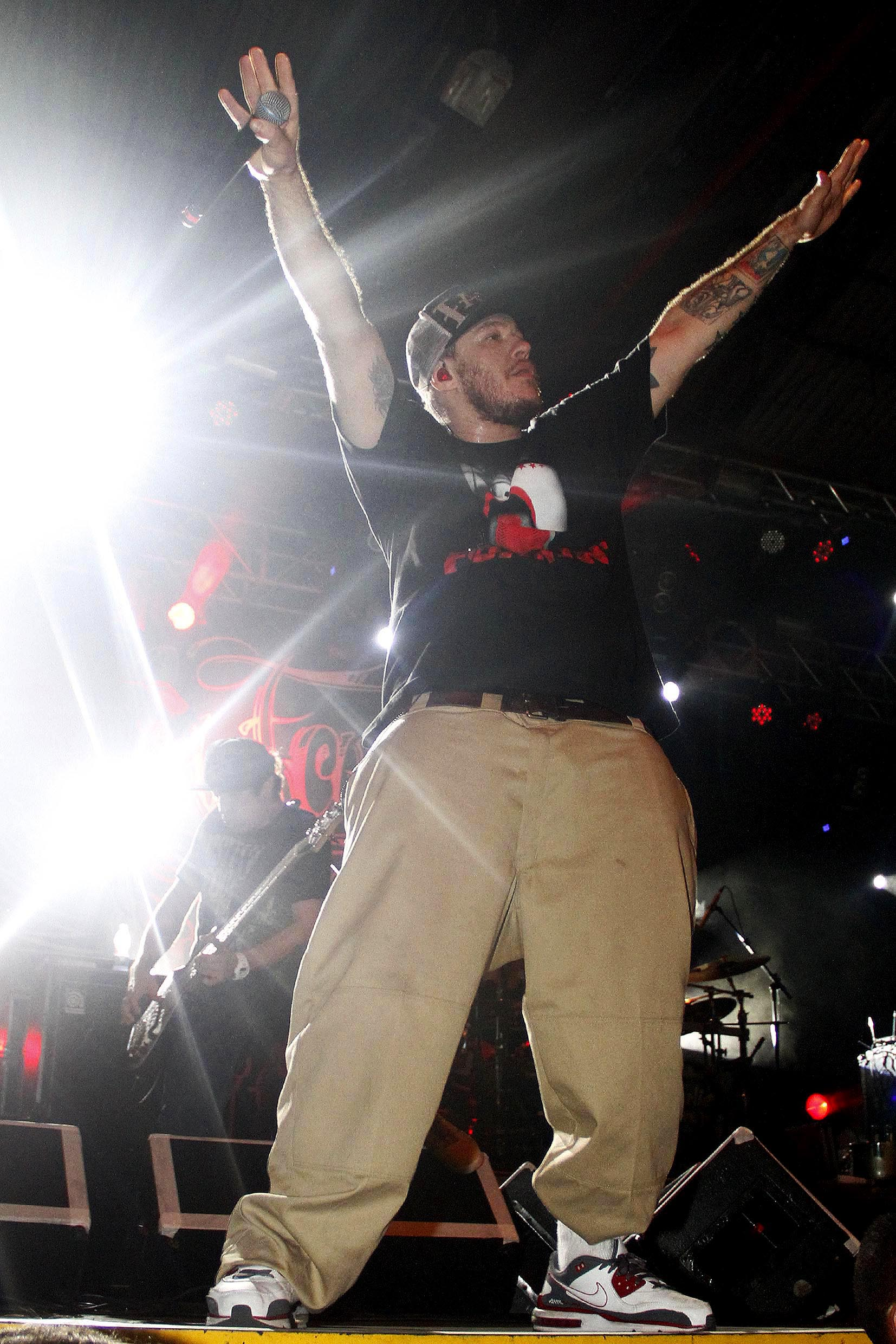
Chorão and Champignon (in the background) performing in 2012

Luiz Carlos Leão Duarte Júnior was born in Santos, São Paulo on June 16, 1978; the son of Maria do Carmo Duarte and Luiz Carlos Duarte, he also had two sisters. In his childhood he learned how to play the bass guitar and the drum kit, but came to prefer the former later in life. His musical career began when he was only 12 years old, as the bassist of juvenile band What's Up, through which he met and befriended Chorão. It was Chorão who nicknamed him "Champignon", because he thought his hairstyle at the time resembled a mushroom. In 1992, shortly after the end of What's Up, they formed Charlie Brown Jr. alongside guitarists Thiago Castanho and Marcão, and drummer Renato Pelado. Amid a series of creative divergences and clashes with Chorão, Champignon, Marcão and Pelado left Charlie Brown Jr. in 2005 (Castanho was already no longer a member since 2001), after which Chorão put the band on hold.

Following his departure from Charlie Brown Jr., Champignon formed his own band, Revolucionnários, of which he was the vocalist. Their only studio album, Retratos da Humanidade, came out in 2006 through Champignon's own record label, Champirado Records, awarding him his second Multishow Brazilian Music Award in 2007 in the "Best Instrumentalist" category – he had previously won the award in 2004, while still with Charlie Brown Jr. During his tenure with Revolucionnários, Champignon also won the MTV Video Music Brazil Award, in the "Best Bassist" category, for three years in a row (2005–2007). The band broke up in 2008, after which he joined the short-lived Nove Mil Anjos invited by Junior Lima; his other bandmates also included vocalist Perí Carpigiani and guitarist Peu Sousa, a former member of singer Pitty's live band. After releasing a single studio album the same year, Lima put the band on hold in 2009 following a series of creative divergences between the bandmembers. Around the same time he was a guest musician on the only album by his former bandmate Marcão's band TH6, Contra Insetos Parasitas.

In 2011 Champignon and Chorão settled their differences and he returned to Charlie Brown Jr. as bassist. The truce was short-lived though, and after an altercation with Chorão during a gig in Apucarana, Paraná in 2012, he was expelled from the band on stage. One day later though, Chorão changed his mind and allowed Champignon to stay. On March 6, 2013, Charlie Brown Jr. effectively ended its activities following the death of Chorão due to a cocaine overdose.

Champignon's final project was A Banca, a tribute act/"spiritual successor" to Charlie Brown Jr. comprising former members Bruno Graveto, Thiago Castanho and Marcão, as well as new addition Helena "Lena" Papini. Their only release was the single "O Novo Passo", which came out in August 2013 and was chosen by Rolling Stone Brasil one of the best Brazilian songs of the year. A Banca was, however, overshadowed by controversy; a parcel of Charlie Brown Jr. fans criticized Champignon for "not respecting Chorão's death" and "not mourning it properly", going to the point of dismissing him as a "cash-grabber", a "traitor" and a "Judas". Champignon always vehemently denied such claims. In one of his final posts to his social media account he stated that the band's first full-length album was slated for an early 2014 release, following the end of their Chorão Eterno Tour in late August, but this never came to be.

Towards the end of his life Champignon began to experience bouts of anxiety and sunk into a profound depression, disgruntled by criticism, his insecurities and financial problems caused by his hastiness. On the night of September 8, 2013, after an argument with his wife at a restaurant, he returned home, locked himself in his studio at his apartment and, at 0:30 a.m. of September 9, committed suicide by shooting himself in the head with a .380 ACP pistol. Four months prior, his former Nove Mil Anjos bandmate Peu Sousa had also committed suicide, by hanging; coincidentally, both he and Sousa died aged 35.

Champignon was buried at the Cemitério Memorial Necrópole Ecumênica at his hometown of Santos, where Chorão was also buried six months prior. His wife, fellow musician Claudia Bossle Campos (whom he met in 2009 and married in 2012), with whom he had a daughter, Maria Amélia (born 2014), later stated that "everything would have been different if he and Chorão had truly forgiven each other". Two years after his death, she released a song in tribute to him, entitled "Bright Light", accompanied by a music video; the song was later included in her 2018 extended play Bosslechamp, released on what would have been his 40th birthday on June 16, which also contains songs they wrote together. Both he and his wife were Spiritists. From a previous marriage with Nicole Mecatti the musician had another daughter, Luiza, aged 8 at the time of his death.

=== Legacy ===
In 2017, filmmaker Gabriel Mellin announced he was working on a biopic about Champignon, entitled Champ, which focuses on his relationship with Chorão. The script was being written by him alongside the musician's widow, Claudia Bossle. Since then, however, no further announcements were made.

A biography, also entitled Champ and authored by Pedro de Luna (who previously wrote biographies of Planet Hemp and Speedfreaks), was published in September 2022 by Ilustre Editora.

== Discography ==
=== Charlie Brown Jr. ===
- (1997) Transpiração Contínua Prolongada
- (1999) Preço Curto... Prazo Longo
- (2000) Nadando com os Tubarões
- (2001) Abalando a Sua Fábrica
- (2002) Bocas Ordinárias
- (2003) Acústico MTV: Charlie Brown Jr.
- (2004) Tamo Aí na Atividade
- (2012) Música Popular Caiçara
- (2013) La Familia 013

=== Revolucionnários ===
- (2006) Retratos da Humanidade

=== Nove Mil Anjos ===
- (2008) 9MA
