= Marcão Britto =

Brazilian singer-songwriter and guitarist (born 1970)

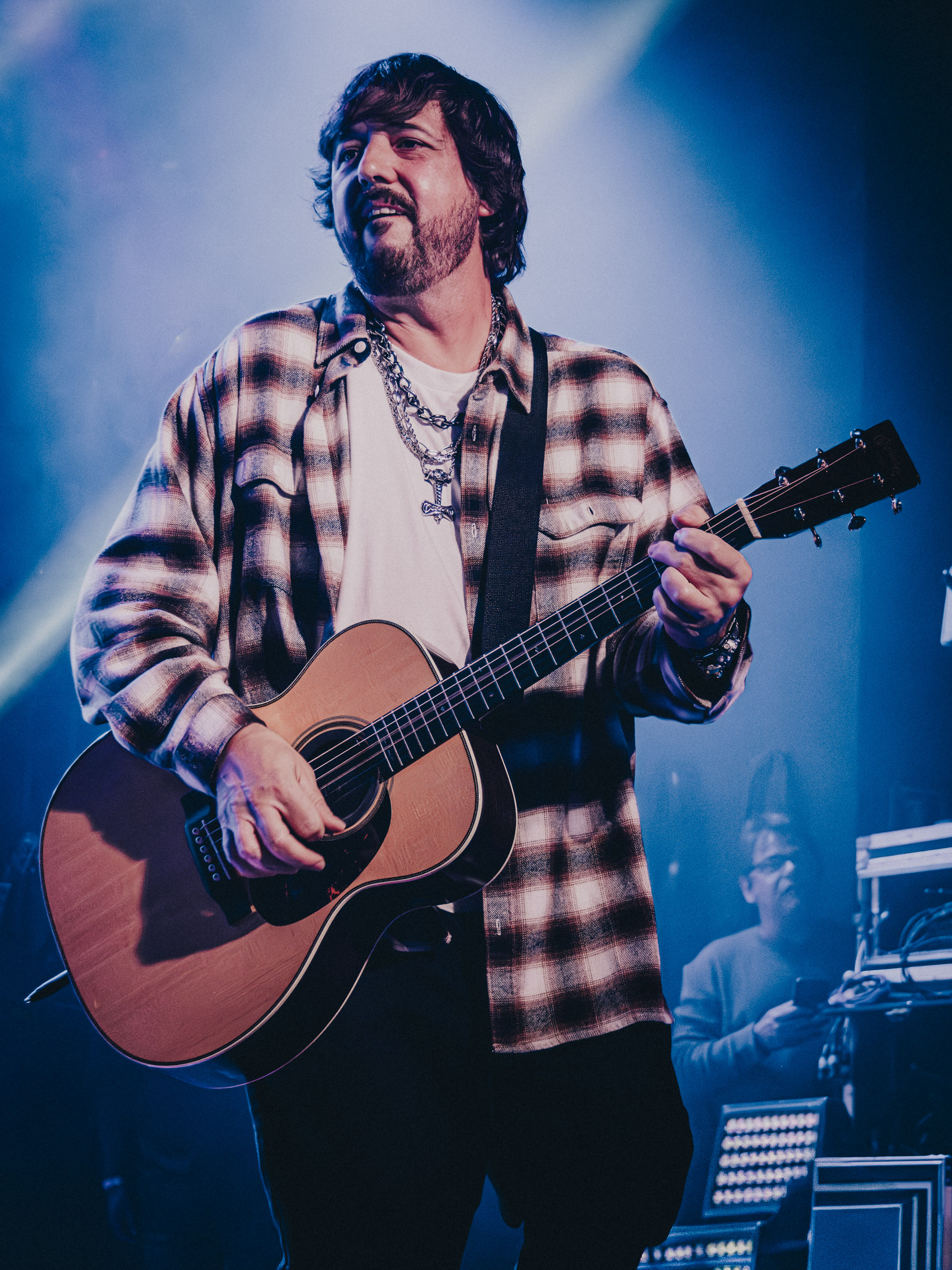
- Marcão playing live in 2026
- Born: Marco Antônio Valentim Britto Júnior; October 1, 1970 (age 55); Santos, São Paulo, Brazil
- Occupations: Singer-songwriter, guitarist, record producer
- Years active: 1982–present
- Musical career
- Genres: Alternative rock, pop rock, rap rock, funk rock, skate punk, reggae rock
- Instruments: Vocals, electric guitar

Marco Antônio Valentim Britto Júnior (born October 1, 1970), known professionally as Marcão Britto or simply as Marcão, is a Brazilian singer-songwriter, lyricist, guitarist, record producer and YouTuber best known for his work with bands Charlie Brown Jr., TH6, A Banca and Bula.

== Biography ==
Marco Antônio Valentim Britto Júnior was born in Santos, São Paulo on October 1, 1970. He began his musical career around 1982 playing in garage bands, and through one of these projects, Last Joker, he would meet his future Charlie Brown Jr. bandmate Renato Pelado. Parallel to his burgeoning musical career he also worked as a guitar teacher and briefly as a realtor. In 1992 he was approached by Chorão to join his band, What's Up, which later evolved to become Charlie Brown Jr.; he stayed with the band until 2005, recording six critically acclaimed studio albums, when creative divergences and clashes with Chorão prompted his departure alongside other members Champignon and Renato Pelado. Shortly after leaving Charlie Brown Jr. he founded TH6; the band released its only album, Contra Insetos Parasitas, in 2008, entering an indefinite hiatus period in 2010 following the birth of Marcão's son Gabriel. Around the same time he was part of the short-lived supergroup Rockfellas alongside Paul Di'Anno (Iron Maiden), Canisso (Raimundos) and Jean Dolabella (Sepultura).

Marcão accepted an invitation to return to Charlie Brown Jr. in 2011, staying until 2013 when the band ended following the death of Chorão. Soon afterwards, he and remaining Charlie Brown Jr. members Champignon, Thiago Castanho and Bruno Graveto teamed up with Lena Papini to form A Banca, described as a "tribute act/spiritual successor" to Charlie Brown Jr.; they released a single, "O Novo Passo", in August, before splitting up as well due to the suicide of Champignon one month later. In 2014, the remaining members of A Banca reformed as Bula. Alongside Graveto and Lena Papini, Marcão also played for D'Chapas.

Marcão has also made guest appearances on shows of band Kiara Rocks in 2013, and in 2014 produced the debut EP by group Trela, A Arte de Improvisar. The same year, alongside Lena Papini and musicians Egypcio and P.G. of Tihuana fame, he formed the tribute act to Legião Urbana Urbana Legion.

In 2017, he and Pinguim Ruas were guest musicians on Bruno Thadeu's song "A Miséria Comprou a Razão (Ouro Vira Areia)".

In 2019, he, Pinguim and Heitor Gomes reunited Charlie Brown Jr. for a controversial series of shows around Brazil, with guest vocalists. The band was reunited again in 2021 for a special tour celebrating Chorão's 50th birthday, but on October 25 he and bandmate Thiago Castanho parted ways, citing creative divergences with Chorão's son Alexandre, the tour's organizer.

On October 22, 2011, Marcão opened up his official YouTube channel, in which he posts guitar lessons and curiosities about Charlie Brown Jr..

== Discography ==
=== Charlie Brown Jr. ===
- (1997) Transpiração Contínua Prolongada
- (1999) Preço Curto... Prazo Longo
- (2000) Nadando com os Tubarões
- (2001) Abalando a Sua Fábrica
- (2002) Bocas Ordinárias
- (2003) Acústico MTV: Charlie Brown Jr.
- (2004) Tamo Aí na Atividade
- (2012) Música Popular Caiçara
- (2013) La Familia 013

=== TH6 ===
- (2008) Contra Insetos Parasitas

=== Bula ===
- (2014) Não Estamos Sozinhos
- (2019) Realidade Placebo
- (2023) Indivíduo Coletivo
