= Negra Li =

Brazilian singer, actress and dancer (born 1979)

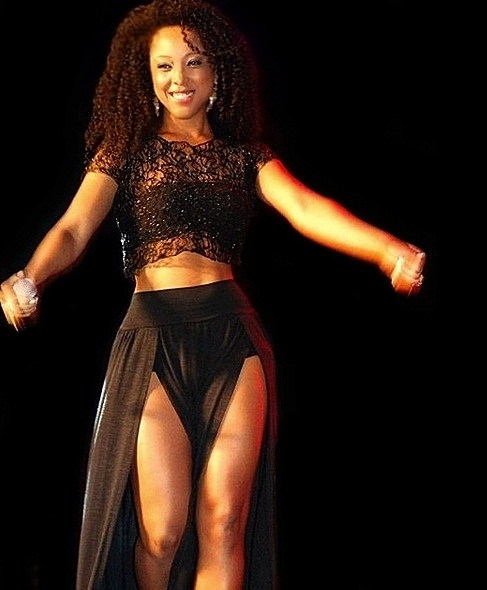

Background information
- Also known as: Negra Li
- Born: Liliane de Carvalho; September 17, 1979 (age 46); São Paulo, Brazil
- Genres: Hip-hop, R&B, soul
- Occupations: Singer; actress; dancer; rapper
- Instrument: Vocals
- Years active: 1996–present
- Website: Official website

Negra Li (born Liliane de Carvalho, São Paulo, September 17, 1979) is a Brazilian singer, actress and dancer. She was one of the lead actresses in the 2006 musical drama film Antônia.

In 2016 Negra Li released a single called "Sunshine" featuring her husband Jr. Dread. The song was written and produced by Jamaican producer Adrian "Donsome" Hanson for Donsome Records.

In 2022, she performed, cosplaying as a peacock in the reality singing competition The Masked Singer Brasil.

== Discography ==
=== Albums ===
Album Title	Album details	Peak chart positions	
Album Title	Album details	BRA	Top 40
Guerreiro, Guerreira	Released: 17 January 2005; Label: Universal Music; Format: CD; Sales: 50,000	18	15
Negra Livre	Released: 21 October 2006; Label: Universal Music; Format: CD, download digital; Sales: 150,000	1	1
Antônia	Released: 17 December 2006; Label: Som Livre; Format: CD, download digital; Sales: 50,000	4	5
Tudo De Novo	Released: 26 June 2012; Label: Universal Music; Format: CD, download digital; Sales: 20,000	8	12
Raízes	Released: 23 November 2018; Label: White Monkey Recordings; Format: CD, download digital	—	—

=== Singles ===
List of singles as lead artist, with selected chart positions, showing year released and album name
Year	Title	Peak chart positions			Album
Year	Title	BRA	HSPN	POR	Album
2000	"Não é Sério" (feat. Charlie Brown Jr.)	1	7	42	Nadando com os Tubarões
2004	"Exercito do Rap"	12	—	—	Guerreiro, Guerreira
2004	"O Rap Não Tem Pra Ninguém" (feat. Marcelo D2)	62	—	—	Guerreiro, Guerreira
2005	"Deixa Rolar" (feat. Gabriel o Pensador)	45	—	—	Cavaleiro Andante
2006	"Você Vai Estar na Minha"	1	18	37	Negra Livre
2006	"Antonia" (feat. Leilah Moreno, Quelynah e Cindy Mendes)	2	49	—	Antônia
2007	"Nada Pode Me Parar" (feat. Leilah Moreno, Quelynah e Cindy Mendes)	18	—	—	Antônia
2007	"Brasilândia City Bronx" (feat. Leilah Moreno, Quelynah e Cindy Mendes)	49	—	—	Antônia
2007	"Amar em Vão"	9	—	—	Negra Live
2007	"Ninguém Pode Me Impedir"	30	—	—	Negra Live
2008	"Meus Telefonemas" (feat. Caetano Veloso)	35	—	73	Negra Live
2008	"1 Minuto" (feat. D'Black)	1	13	—	Sem Ar
2008	"Não Dá Mais Sem Você" (feat. Belo)	16	—	—	Pra Ver o Sol Brilhar – Ao Vivo
2008	"Ainda Gosto Dela" (feat. Skank)	4	28	—	Estandarte
2009	"Beautiful" (feat. Akon)	19	36	43	Freedom
2012	"Tudo De Novo"	49	—	—	Tudo De Novo
2012	"Volta Pra Casa"	56	—	—	Tudo De Novo
2013	"Vai Passar"	71	—	—	Tudo De Novo
2015	"O Homem Que Não Tinha Nada" (feat. Projota)	18	—	—	Foco, Força e Fé
2018	"Favela Vive 3" (with ADL, Choice, Djonga and Menor do Chapa)	62	—	—	—N/a
2018	"Malandro Chora"	—	—	—	Raízes
2018	"Raízes"	—	—	—	Raízes
2019	"Poesia Acústica #7 – Céu Azul" (with Hariel, Ducon, Kevin O Chris, Chris, Matuê, DK, Vitão)	27	—	—	—N/a
2019	"Brasilândia"	—	—	—	—N/a
2021	"Comando"	61	—	—	—N/a
2021	"Eu Preciso Ir" (with Ferrugem)	—	—	—	—N/a
2022	"Era Uma Vez Liliane"	—	—	—	—N/a
2022	"Malagueta"	—	—	—	—N/a
2023	"Vai dar Certo"	34	—	—	Vai na Fé
