= Tadeu Patolla =

Brazilian guitarist and record producer (born 1959)

- Birth name: Luiz Antônio Tadeu Eliezer
- Born: March 30, 1959 (age 66); Santos, São Paulo, Brazil
- Genres: Rock
- Occupation(s): Musician, record producer
- Instrument(s): Rhythm guitar, classical guitar
- Years active: Late 1970s – present

Luiz Antônio Tadeu Eliezer (born March 30, 1959), known professionally as Tadeu Patolla, is a Brazilian guitarist and Latin Grammy Award-winning record producer best known for discovering the then-relatively new alternative rock band Charlie Brown Jr. in 1995 and launching them into mainstream fame.

== Biography ==
Patolla was born in Santos, São Paulo on March 30, 1959. He began his career, initially as a musician, in the late 1970s playing for cover bands Rock Memory and Rock Cover. In the early 1980s, alongside former Patrulha do Espaço bassist Oswaldo "Cokinho" Gennari, Leonardo Giordano and Maurício Pedrosa, he formed the "one-hit wonder" band Telex, whose only release prior to their disbandment was the 7" single "Só Delírio" through CBS Records International in 1984. In 1986 he formed the pop/comedy rock band Lagoa 66, who had shortened their name only to "Lagoa" by the time of the release of their only studio album, Agora Sai!, in 1995.

In 1988 he debuted as a producer, on Skowa e a Máfia's album La Famiglia. In 1995 he was acquainted with the up-and-coming band Charlie Brown Jr. through its bassist, Champignon, who sent him over a demo so he could evaluate their work. Patolla then approached the band's vocalist, Chorão, convincing him to sing in Portuguese rather than the "broken English" he used to, and to "experiment" more with other genres such as hip hop, reggae, ska and hardcore punk, thus developing the eclectic sonority Charlie Brown Jr. would be known for. Alongside Rick Bonadio, Patolla produced the band's 1997 debut, Transpiração Contínua Prolongada, and his band Lagoa, in one of its final credited works prior to its break-up, made a guest appearance on the track "Escalas Tropicais"; he would produce other further five albums for Charlie Brown Jr., and also be a guest musician on their 2003 Acústico MTV live album/DVD. When Champignon left the band in 2005 to form his own project, Revolucionnários, Patolla produced their only release, Retratos da Humanidade; he also produced Contra Insetos Parasitas in 2008, the only release by TH6, a project by also former Charlie Brown Jr. member Marcão.

Patolla has also worked with other bands and artists such as Biquini Cavadão, Deborah Blando, Jorge Ben Jor, Wilson Sideral, Aliados, Pedra Letícia and Strike. In 2012 he won a Latin Grammy Award for his work in Beto Lee's Celebração & Sacrifício.

In 2019 he launched the indie band Curinga Roque, producing their debut single "Não Vá Embora".
