= Raimundos =

Brazilian punk band

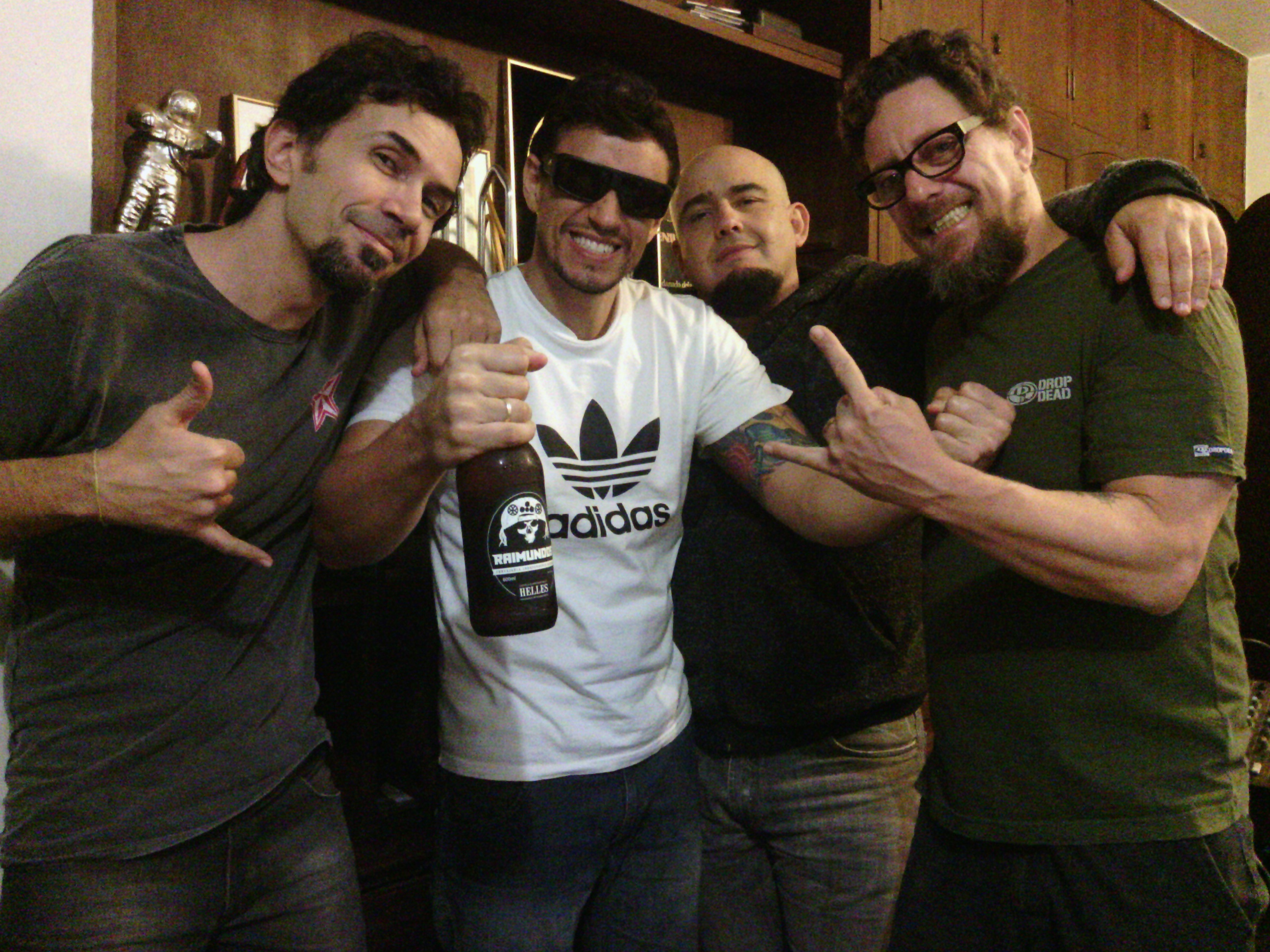

Background information
- Origin: Brasília, Brazil
- Genres: Hardcore punk; punk rock; crossover thrash; forrocore
- Years active: 1987–present
- Labels: WEA, Som Livre
- Members: Digão; Marquim; Caio
- Past members: Rodolfo; Fred; Alf; Canisso
- Website: raimundos.com.br

Raimundos is a Brazilian hardcore punk band formed in 1987 by Digão (Rodrigo Aguiar) and Rodolfo Abrantes, in Brasília, Distrito Federal. They had major influences from 1980s punk bands, especially Ramones, which their name is a play on, while also mixing in elements of Brazilian traditional music such as forró. Raimundos went on to achieve major success and become one of the most influential rock bands of Brazil in the 1990s, with multiple gold records and a double platinum certification on their MTV live album. The band's prominence decreased significantly with the exit of vocalist Abrantes to focus on religious activities.

Their first album Raimundos (1994) has backing vocals by João Gordo of Ratos de Porão and the members of Titãs (whose label Banguela Records released the album), while vocalist Derrick Green of Sepultura participated on their album Kavookavala.

== Band members ==
=== Current members ===
- Digão – lead vocals (2001–present), guitars (1992–present), backing vocals (1992–2001), drums (1987–1990)
- Marquim – guitars, backing vocals (2001–present)
- Caio – drums (2007–present)
- Jean Moura – bass, backing vocals (2023–present)

==== Former members ====
- Rodolfo Abrantes – lead vocals, guitars (1987–2001)
- Fred Castro – drums (1992–2007)
- Alf Sá – bass guitar (2002–2007)
- Canisso – bass, backing vocals (1987–2002, 2007–2023; his death)

== Discography ==
=== Studio albums ===
- (1994) Raimundos
- (1995) Lavô Tá Novo
- (1997) Lapadas do Povo
- (1999) Só no Forevis
- (2002) Kavookavala
- (2014) Cantigas de Roda
- (2025) XXX

=== Live/video albums ===
- (2000) MTV ao Vivo
- (2011) Roda Viva
- (2014) Cantigas de Garagem
- (2017) Acústico

=== Other releases ===
- (1996) Cesta Básica
- (2001) Éramos Quatro
- (2005) Mais MTV
