= Charlie Brown Jr. discography =

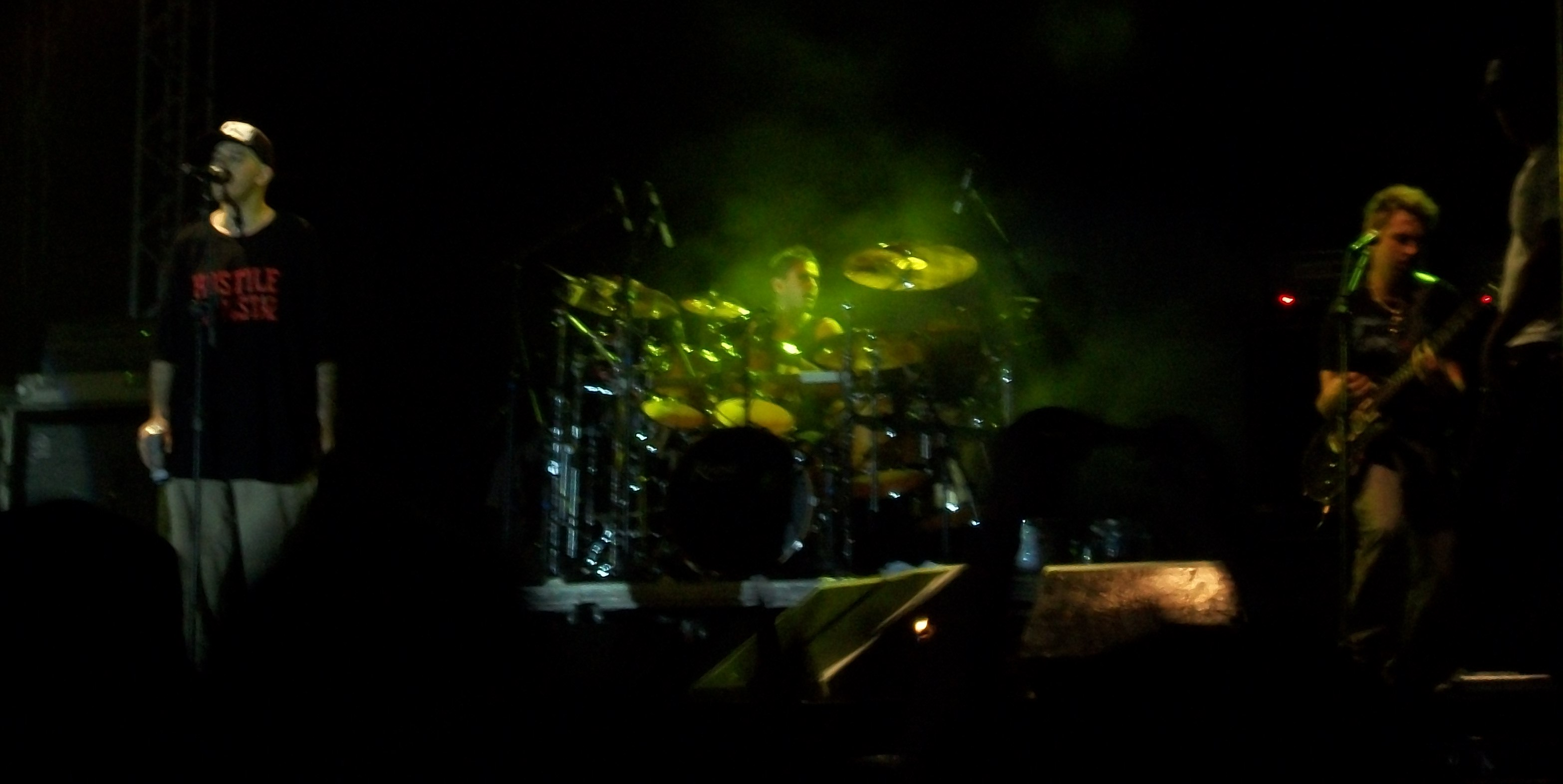
- A performance of the band in Araçatuba, 2011
- Studio albums: 10
- EPs: 1
- Live albums: 3
- Compilation albums: 9
- Singles: 35
- Video albums: 7

The discography of the Brazilian rock band Charlie Brown Jr. consists of ten studio albums, six video albums, three live albums, one extended play, one compilation and one demo tape. The band was formed in Santos, São Paulo in 1992 by members of What's Up, a former project of vocalist Chorão that, by the time of its demise, already had in its line-up bassist Champignon, guitarists Marcão Britto and Thiago Castanho, and drummer Renato Pelado. In 1994 they released their first demo and Champignon sent it to record producer Tadeu Patolla, who in his turn showed it to his friend Rick Bonadio; Bonadio then secured the band a contract with Virgin Records and their debut, Transpiração Contínua Prolongada, came out in 1997.

Castanho left the band in 2001, after the release of their third album Nadando com os Tubarões, and they continued as a quartet until Tamo Aí na Atividade, when a series of creative divergences prompted the departure of its entire line-up. After a brief hiatus, Chorão reactivated the band in 2005 with Heitor Gomes on bass, André Pinguim on drums and Castanho returning as guitarist. Pinguim's contract expired in 2008, after which he was replaced by Bruno Graveto, and in 2011, following the departure of Gomes, Champignon and Marcão Britto returned to make Charlie Brown Jr. a quintet again.

While the band was working on their tenth studio album, La Familia 013, Chorão, who had always struggled with substance abuse, died due to a cocaine overdose on March 6, 2013, effectively ending the group's activities. Six months later, on September 9, Champignon committed suicide by firearm following increasing bouts of anxiety and depression. The album, eventually their last, was released posthumously on October 8.

On July 13, 2021, the live album Chegou Quem Faltava, originally recorded during a 2011 show, received a posthumous release through Sony Music.

Year	Album	Label	Certifications
Demo albums
1995	Charlie Brown Jr.	Self-released	
Studio albums
1997	Transpiração Contínua Prolongada	Virgin Records	PMB: Platinum
1999	Preço Curto... Prazo Longo	Virgin Records	PMB: Platinum
2000	Nadando com os Tubarões	Virgin Records	
2001	Abalando a Sua Fábrica	EMI	
2002	Bocas Ordinárias	EMI	PMB: Gold
2004	Tamo Aí na Atividade	EMI	PMB: Platinum
2005	Imunidade Musical	EMI	PMB: Gold
2007	Ritmo, Ritual e Responsa	EMI	PMB: Gold
2009	Camisa 10 Joga Bola Até na Chuva	Sony Music	PMB: Platinum
2013	La Familia 013 (posthumous album)	Som Livre	
EPs
1999	Aquele Luxo!	Virgin Records	
Live/video albums
2002	Ao Vivo	EMI	
2003	Acústico MTV	EMI	PMB: Platinum
2005	Skate Vibration	EMI	PMB: Gold
2008	Ritmo, Ritual e Responsa - Ao Vivo	EMI	
2012	Música Popular Caiçara	Radar Records	
2021	Chegou Quem Faltava (posthumous album recorded in 2011)	Sony Music	
Compilation albums
2007	De 1997 a 2007	EMI	PMB: Diamond

== Certified songs ==
Title	Year	Certifications	Album
"Proibida pra Mim (Grazon)"	1997	PMB: Gold	Transpiração Contínua Prolongada
"Tudo Que Ela Gosta de Escutar"	1998	PMB: Gold	Transpiração Contínua Prolongada
"Zóio de Lula"	1999	PMB: Gold	Preço Curto... Prazo Longo
"Longe de Você"	2004	PMB: Gold	Tamo Aí na Atividade
Lutar Pelo Que é Meu	2005	PMB: Gold	Imunidade Musical
"Ela Vai Voltar (Todos os Defeitos de uma Mulher Perfeita)"	2006	PMB: Diamond	Imunidade Musical
"Dias de Luta, Dias de Glória"	2006	PMB: Platinum	Imunidade Musical
Dona do Meu Pensamento	2009	PMB: Platinum	Camisa 10 Joga Bola Até na Chuva
Me Encontra	2009	PMB: Platinum	Camisa 10 Joga Bola Até na Chuva
"Só os Loucos Sabem"	2010	PMB: Diamond	Camisa 10 Joga Bola Até na Chuva
Céu Azul	2011	PMB: Platinum	Música Popular Caiçara ao Vivo
Three Little Birds	2022	PMB: Gold	Chegou Quem Faltava
