= Ritmo, Ritual e Responsa – Ao Vivo =

Video by Charlie Brown Jr.
- Released: 2008
- Recorded: June 29, 2007
- Venue: Expresso Brasil, São Paulo
- Genre: Alternative rock, rap rock, skate punk, funk rock, reggae rock
- Length: 1:12:00
- Label: EMI

Charlie Brown Jr. live/video albums chronology
Skate Vibration (2005)	Ritmo, Ritual e Responsa – Ao Vivo (2008)	Música Popular Caiçara (2012)

Ritmo, Ritual e Responsa – Ao Vivo (Portuguese for "Rhythm, Ritual and Responsibility – Live") is the fifth DVD by Brazilian alternative rock band Charlie Brown Jr., released in 2008 through EMI. Recorded at a gig at entertainment space Expresso Brasil on June 29, 2007, in São Paulo, promoting the release of their then-upcoming album Ritmo, Ritual e Responsa, it was the band's final release through EMI and counted with guest appearances by rapper MV Bill and pop punk band Forfun.

By the time the video album was released, drummer Pinguim Ruas was no longer a member of the band; he had left Charlie Brown Jr. in April 2008 as his contract expired and both parties decided not to renew it. As a consequence of his contractual obligations, he did not receive credit in the liner notes; instead, his subsequent replacement Bruno Graveto was credited, despite not taking part in the recording.

On July 17, 2023, the DVD was re-released in CD format for the first time ever as part of the Charlie Brown Jr. boxset, which compiles the band's entire studio discography.

== Critical reception ==
A short favorable review by DVD Magazine called it "one of the band's best and most well-produced DVDs".

== Track listing ==
1. "Pipeline" (The Chantays cover)
2. "Ninguém Entende Você"
3. "Não Viva em Vão"
4. "Lutar Pelo Que é Meu"
5. "Beco Sem Saída"
6. "No Passo a Passo"
7. "Ela Vai Voltar (Todos os Defeitos de Uma Mulher Perfeita)"
8. "Papo Reto (Prazer é Sexo, o Resto é Negócio)"
9. "O Mundo Explodiu Lá Fora"
10. "Confisco"
11. "Não é Sério"
12. "Liberdade Acima de Tudo"
13. "Senhor do Tempo"
14. "Proibida pra Mim (Grazon)"

=== Bonus tracks ===
1. "Onde Está o Mundo Bom? (Living in L.A.)"
2. "O Universo a Nosso Favor" (feat. Forfun)
3. "Zóio de Lula"
4. "Tudo Que Ela Gosta de Escutar"
5. "Sem Medo da Escuridão" (feat. MV Bill)
6. "Onde Não Existe a Paz, Não Existe o Amor"

== Personnel ==
- Chorão: vocals
- Thiago Castanho: electric guitar
- Pinguim Ruas: drums
- Heitor Gomes: bass guitar
