= Bula (band) =

Brazilian alternative rock group

- Origin: Santos, São Paulo, Brazil
- Genres: Alternative rock; rap rock; funk rock; reggae rock; skate punk; pop rock; rapcore
- Years active: 2014–present
- Label: Deckdisc
- Members: Marcão; Pinguim Ruas; André Freitas
- Past members: Bruno Graveto; Lena Papini
- Website: bularock.com.br

Bula is a Brazilian alternative rock band from Santos, São Paulo, originally composed of former members of the bands Charlie Brown Jr. and A Banca.

== History ==
The band was conceived in mid-2014 by the remaining members of A Banca (with the exception of Thiago Castanho), formed in April of the previous year by former members of Charlie Brown Jr. after the death of its vocalist Chorão; however, A Banca only lasted for five months due to the suicide of its frontman, Champignon. Guitarist/lead vocalist Marcão, bassist Helena "Lena" Papini and drummer Bruno Graveto teamed up to continue making music, dubbing their new group "Bula" in reference both to the papal bull and the seal used to authenticate it, the bulla; as Marcão explained, all of the bandmembers "have their fates sealed together as in a pact". Graveto's stay on the band was short-lived though, as he eventually got busy with other commitments with pop rock band Strike, and was replaced by Pinguim Ruas.

In November 2014 Bula released its debut album, Não Estamos Sozinhos, through Deckdisc. Music videos were later made for "Doses Gigantes" and "O Sol Dela Brilhou", and in the following year they made their breakthrough performance at Lollapalooza. In 2016, André Freitas, who produced Não Estamos Sozinhos, joined them as a second guitarist.

In May 2019 the band released its second album, Realidade Placebo. Later in December they announced on their official Instagram account the departure of Lena Papini. In 2023, following a brief hiatus in consequence of the COVID-19 pandemic, Bula released its third album, Indivíduo Coletivo, preceded by the teaser single "Canção da América".

== Discography ==
=== Studio albums ===
Year	Album
2014	Não Estamos Sozinhos: Label: Deckdisc; Format: CD
2019	Realidade Placebo: Label: Deckdisc; Format: CD
2023	Indivíduo Coletivo: Label: Self-released; Format: Streaming

== Line-up ==
=== Current members ===
- Marcão – lead vocals, electric guitar (2014–present)
- Pinguim Ruas – drums, vocals, beatboxing (2014–present)
- André Freitas – electric guitar (2016–present)

=== Former members ===
- Bruno Graveto – drums (2014)
- Helena "Lena" Papini – bass guitar (2014–2019)
