= A Banca =

Brazilian alternative rock group

- Origin: Santos, São Paulo, Brazil
- Genres: Alternative rock; rap rock; funk rock; reggae rock; skate punk; pop rock; rapcore
- Years active: April – September 2013
- Spinoff of: Charlie Brown Jr., Bula, D'Chapas
- Past members: Champignon; Marcão; Thiago Castanho; Bruno Graveto; Lena Papini

A Banca (Portuguese for "The Stand") was a very short-lived Brazilian alternative rock band from Santos, São Paulo, composed mostly by former Charlie Brown Jr. members and described as a "spiritual successor" of it.

== History ==
Following the break-up of Charlie Brown Jr., caused by the death of vocalist Chorão due to a cocaine overdose on March 6, 2013, the remaining members of the band (guitarists Thiago Castanho and Marcão, drummer Bruno Graveto and bassist Champignon) decided to form a new musical project that would serve as a tribute act both to Charlie Brown Jr. and Chorão, dubbing it "A Banca" (literally translated to English as "The Stand") in allusion to a Brazilian street slang referring to a gathering of friends – i.e., "Charlie Brown Jr.'s friends". (Coincidentally, "A Banca" is also the name of a song by Charlie Brown Jr. from their 2000 album Nadando com os Tubarões.) The only bandmember not originally from Charlie Brown Jr. was bassist Helena "Lena" Papini.

The band's first rehearsal was watched and approved by Chorão's son, and they made their official debut on Serginho Groisman's variety show Altas Horas on April 11, 2013. In May they announced their nationwide Chorão Eterno Tour in tribute to Chorão, in which they covered Charlie Brown Jr.'s greatest hits and also played new compositions. In August they released the single "O Novo Passo", chosen by Rolling Stone Brasil one of the best Brazilian songs of the year. The band played its final show in São Vicente in late August, and in early September vocalist Champignon announced that their first full-length album was scheduled to be released in early 2014.

Despite their apparent success, ever since its inception A Banca was overshadowed by controversy; a parcel of Charlie Brown Jr. fans criticized Champignon for "not respecting Chorão's death" and "not mourning it properly", going to the point of dismissing him as a "cash-grabber", a "traitor" and a "Judas". Even though Champignon always vehemently denied such claims, constant criticism eventually lead him to sink into a major depression, and on September 9, 2013, he committed suicide by shooting himself in the head with a .380 ACP pistol, effectively ending A Banca.

By 2014 the remaining members of A Banca (Castanho excepted) formed a new project, D'Chapas, alongside vocalist Ivan Sader, and with Pinguim Ruas (also a former member of Charlie Brown Jr.), Papini and Marcão formed Bula. Papini left Bula in late 2019.

== Discography ==
=== Single ===
Year	Single	Album
2013	"O Novo Passo"	Non-album song

== Members ==
- Champignon – vocals, beatboxing (2013; died 2013)
- Marcão – electric guitar (2013)
- Thiago Castanho – electric guitar (2013)
- Bruno Graveto – drums (2013)
- Helena "Lena" Papini – bass guitar (2013)
