= 2006 MTV Video Music Brazil =

Award ceremony

- Date: 28 September 2006
- Location: Credicard Hall, São Paulo, São Paulo
- Country: Brazil
- Hosted by: Daniella Cicarelli, Cazé Peçanha and Marcos Mion
- Most awards: Pitty (4)
- Most nominations: Marcelo D2 (5)

Television/radio coverage
- Network: MTV Brasil

The 2006 MTV Video Music Brazil was held on 28 September 2006, at the Credicard Hall in São Paulo, honoring the best Brazilian music videos. The ceremony was hosted by Daniella Cicarelli, Cazé Peçanha and Marcos Mion.

== Winners and nominees ==
The nominees were announced on 15 August 2006. Winners are listed first and highlighted in bold.

Video of the Year: Viewer's Choice	Best New Artist
**Pitty – "Memórias"**; B5 – "Algum Lugar"; Barão Vermelho – "Codinome Beija-Flor"; Cachorro Grande – "Sinceramente"; Charlie Brown Jr. – "Ela Vai Voltar"; CPM 22 – "Apostas e Certezas"; Dead Fish – "Obrigação"; Detonautas – "Não Reclame Mais"; Felipe Dylon – "Em Outra Direção"; Forfun – "História de Verão"; Fresno – "Quebre As Correntes"; Hateen – "1997"; Jay Vaquer – "A Falta Que a Falta Faz"; Jota Quest – "O Sol"; KLB and Pregador Luo – "Obsessão"; Marcelo D2 and Mr. Catra – "Gueto"; Massacration – "Metal Is the Law"; NX Zero – "Apenas Um Olhar"; O Rappa – "De Frente pro Reto"	**Hateen – "Quem Já Perdeu um Sonho Aqui?"**; Cansei de Ser Sexy – "Let's Make Love and Listen to Death from Above"; Canto dos Malditos na Terra do Nunca – "Olha Minha Cara"; Forfun – "Hidropônica"; NX Zero – "Além de Mim"
Best Pop Video	Best MPB Video
**Jota Quest – "O Sol"**; Os Paralamas do Sucesso – "Na Pista"; Pato Fu – "Sorte e Azar"; Sandy & Junior – "Estranho Jeito de Amar"; Skank – "Uma Canção é Pra Isso"	**Los Hermanos – "Morena"**; Marisa Monte – "O Bonde do Dom"; Max de Castro – "No Balanço das Horas"; Mombojó – "O Mais Vendido"; Negra Li – "Você Vai Estar na Minha"
Best Rock Video	Best Rap Video
**Pitty – "Déjà Vu"**; Charlie Brown Jr. – "Ela Vai Voltar"; CPM 22 – "Apostas e Certezas"; Nação Zumbi – "Hoje, Amanhã e Depois"; Rock Rocket – "Roqueiros Também Amam"	**Marcelo D2 and Mr. Catra – "Gueto"**; Black Alien – "Como Eu Te Quero"; Inumanos – "Polegar Opositor"; MV Bill – "O Preto em Movimento"; Pavilhão 9 – "Gimme Tha Power"
Best International Video	Best Independent Video
**Black Eyed Peas – "Pump It"**; Green Day – "Jesus of Suburbia"; Madonna – "Hung Up"; Nickelback – "Photograph"; Simple Plan – "Perfect"	**Banzé – "Doce Ilusão"**; Ecos Falsos – "Réveillon"; Faichecleres – "Metida Demais"; Vanguart – "Cachaça"; Walverdes – "Seja Mais Certo"
Best Artist Website	Best Live Performance
**Pitty fan club (pittybr.com)**; Charlie Brown Jr. fan club (charliebrownjunior.net); CPM 22 fan club (fcocpm22.com.br); Hateen fan club (hateenfco.com.br); Los Hermanos fan club (hermaniacos.blogger.com.br)	**CPM 22 – "Inevitável"**; Armandinho – "Desenho de Deus"; Barão Vermelho – "Codinome Beija-Flor"; O Rappa – "Pescador de Ilusões"; Titãs – "Vossa Excelência"
Best Direction in a Video	Best Art Direction in a Video
**Sepultura – "Convicted in Life" (Director: Luis Carone)**; Banzé – "Doce Ilusão" (Director: Paulinho Caruso); Charlie Brown Jr. – "Ela Vai Voltar" (Directors: Afonso Poyart and Ludmilla Rossi); Marcelo D2 and Mr. Catra – "Gueto" (Director: Johnny Araújo); Nasi – "Corpo Fechado" (Director: Selton Mello)	**Nação Zumbi – "Hoje, Amanhã e Depois" (Art Director: Ricardo Carelli)**; Charlie Brown Jr. – "Ela Vai Voltar" (Art Directors: Afonso Poyart and Ludmilla Rossi); Inumanos – "Polegar Opositor" (Art Director: Cadu Macedo); Marcelo D2 and Mr. Catra – "Gueto" (Art Directors: Lica Greinstein, Marie Lanna and Marcos Vaz); Sepultura – "Convicted in Life" (Art Director: Luis Carone)
Best Editing in a Video	Best Cinematography in a Video
**Sepultura – "Convicted in Life" (Editors: Luis Carone and Rodrigo Menecucci)**; CPM 22 – "Inevitável" (Editor: Sérgio Severino); F.UR.T.O. – "Flores nas Encostas do Cimento" (Editor: Nobuyuki Ogata); Marcelo D2 and Mr. Catra – "Gueto" (Editor: Johnny Araújo); Rock Rocket – "Roqueiros Também Amam" (Editors: Luis Carone and Rodrigo Menecucci)	**Lulu Santos – "Vale de Lágrimas" (Director of Photography: Marcelo Trotta)**; Nasi – "Corpo Fechado" (Director of Photography: Juarez Pavelak); Negra Li – "Você Vai Estar na Minha" (Director of Photography: Marcelo Trotta); Os Paralamas do Sucesso – "Na Pista" (Director of Photography: Ricardo de la Rosa); Sepultura – "Convicted in Life" (Director of Photography: Pierre Kerchove)
Dream Band
**Pitty (vocals)**; **Fabrizio Martinelli (guitar)**; **Champignon (bass)**; **Ricardo Japinha (drums)**
