= Charlie Brown Jr. (band) =

Brazilian rock group

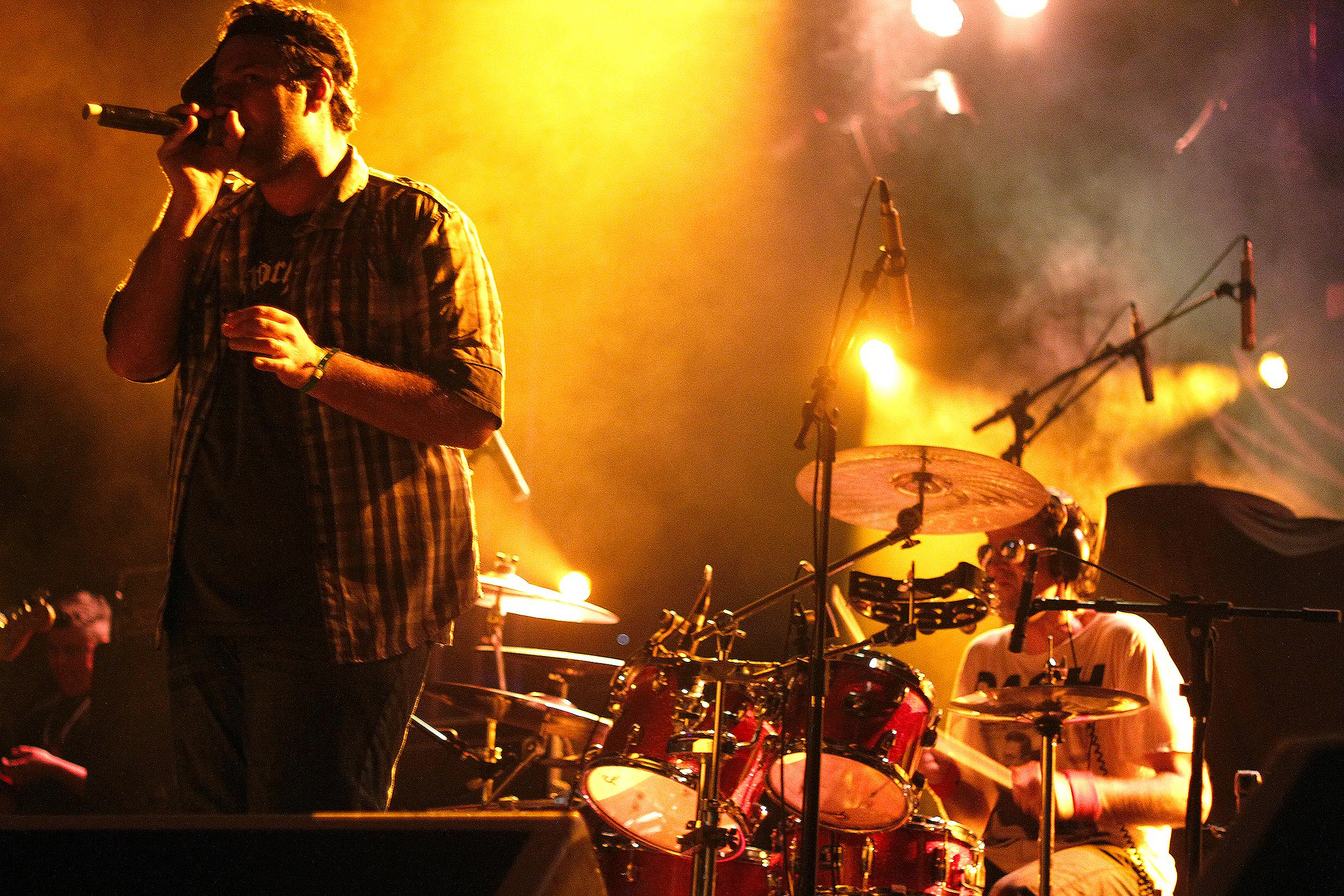
- Charlie Brown Jr. performing in 2012

Background information
- Origin: Santos, São Paulo, Brazil
- Genres: Skate punk; rap rock; reggae punk; ska punk; funk rock; melodic hardcore
- Years active: 1992–2013
- Labels: EMI, Sony Music, Som Livre
- Spinoffs: Revolucionnários; TH6; A Banca; Bula; D'Chapas
- Spinoff of: What's Up
- Past members: Chorão; Champignon; Heitor Gomes; Marcão Britto; Thiago Castanho; Renato Pelado; Pinguim Ruas; Bruno Graveto

Charlie Brown Jr. was a Brazilian rock band from Santos, São Paulo. The group was popular with disadvantaged youth because of their relatable commentary about social issues and the frequent use of skate punk and hip hop slang in their songs. The band won two Latin Grammy Awards and was one of the most-popular Brazilian bands of the late 1990s to mid-2000s.

Vocalist Chorão's drug addiction and disagreements with other musicians frequently overshadowed the band. Chorão was the only founding member to remain through several lineup changes. After Chorão died of a cocaine overdose on 6 March 2013, the band disbanded.

In 2015, the streaming platform Deezer reported that Charlie Brown Jr. was the second most-listened-to Brazilian band outside Brazil. In a Spotify survey also from 2015, the band placed 31st out of the 47 most-popular bands and artists.

== History ==
=== Early years ===
Chorão formed the band What's Up, shortly after his move from São Paulo to Santos, in 1987. After a lineup change in 1990, twelve-year-old bassist Champignon joined the band, followed by Marcão, Renato Pelado, and Thiago Castanho. In 1992, Chorão revamped What's Up with a new name. He chose Charlie Brown Jr., explaining that Charlie Brown came from when he crashed his car into a coconut stand with a drawing of Charles M. Schulz's comic strip Peanuts on it. The "Jr." alluded to the fact that he considered himself and the band "the children of rock".

What's Up and Charlie Brown Jr. developed a heavy style influenced by crossover thrash and hardcore punk, with lyrics in English. Some of Chorão's greatest inspirations were Blink-182, Sublime, Bad Brains, NOFX, Suicidal Tendencies, Biohazard, Faith No More, and 311. The band initially struggled because most members had to rent or borrow their instruments, often forcing the band to cancel performances. Champignon, who was underage, needed a permit signed by his parents to perform at shows.

In 1995, they recorded their first demo tape, the self-titled Charlie Brown Jr. To finance the recording, Champignon pawned one of his bass guitars, and Chorão pawned a television set. The underground scene of Santos responded positively to the demo, motivating Champignon to show it to his friend, record producer Tadeu Patolla. Patolla was impressed but advised Chorão to sing in Portuguese and experiment with other genres, such as hip hop, reggae, and ska, taking Red Hot Chili Peppers and Rage Against the Machine as inspiration. Subsequently, Patolla introduced the group to fellow producer Rick Bonadio, and they helped the band secure a contract with Virgin Records. Virgin released the band's debut album, Transpiração Contínua Prolongada, in 1997.

In early 1999, the band released a promotional extended play entitled Aquele Luxo! as a teaser for a forthcoming album. Preço Curto... Prazo Longo came out on 6 March 1999, and was the band's longest album, with 25 tracks. Chorão later said it was recorded out of necessity because the band did not have much of an original repertoire for their live shows. The album's first single, "Zóio de Lula", was released on 1 April 1999. It was the band's first song to reach first place on Brazilian radio. The band made a music video for the single, featuring a then-19-year-old Luize Altenhofen.

=== 2000s ===
Nadando com os Tubarões, Charlie Brown Jr.'s third album, was released in November 2000. It included guest appearances by the rap group RZO (fronted by Sabotage at the time) and up-and-coming singer Negra Li, who co-wrote the album's biggest hit, "Não É Sério". Nadando com os Tubarões was nominated for a Latin Grammy Award for Best Portuguese Language Rock or Alternative Album in 2001. Shortly after the album's release, guitarist Thiago Castanho left Charlie Brown Jr., citing his dissatisfaction with their extensive touring schedule.

The band's fourth album, Abalando a Sua Fábrica, came out on 1 November 2001, under their new label EMI. It was their first recording as a quartet and the band shifted away from their rap rock-inflected sonority, toward a "rawer" style influenced by punk and garage rock. The band achieved this sound by recording all instrumental parts simultaneously as if they were recording live.

In 2002, Charlie Brown Jr. released their first DVD, Charlie Brown Jr. ao Vivo, recorded live at a concert at the DirecTV Music Hall in São Paulo. Later, this show was broadcast by direct broadcast satellite service provider DirecTV. That year, the band toured internationally, with a leg in Portugal. After a Portuguese newspaper critic called them "bocas ordinárias", a Portuguese expression for a "foul-mouthed" person, Chorão decided to use this as the name of their next album. Bocas Ordinárias was considered one of the band's best albums by fans and critics alike, earning a nomination for the Latin Grammy Award in 2003. Chorão dedicated the album to singer Cássia Eller, a friend who died the year prior.

In 2003, Charlie Brown Jr. filmed an episode of Acústico MTV, the Brazilian equivalent of MTV Unplugged. Their critically acclaimed performance featured guest appearances by Marcelo D2, Marcelo Nova, RZO, and Negra Li. Acústico MTV: Charlie Brown Jr. was released on CD and DVD formats on 20 September 2003.

Their sixth studio album, Tamo Aí na Atividade, came out in December 2004 and won the Latin Grammy Award in 2005. However, its recording sessions were plagued by creative differences and clashes between Chorão and his bandmates. By early 2005, Champignon, Marcão, and Renato Pelado left the group. Chorão announced that Charlie Brown Jr. was on hiatus for an indeterminate time, leading many to speculate that the band was splitting up.

Charlie Brown Jr. returned from their hiatus with a new lineup: bassist Heitor Gomes, drummer/beatboxer Pinguim Ruas, and original founding member Thiago Castanho on guitar. Their album, Imunidade Musical, featured a guest appearance by rapper Rappin' Hood. It was nominated for a Latin Grammy Award in 2006. Around the same time, the band released a DVD, Skate Vibration, recorded at the inauguration of Chorão's Skate Park.

The band released Ritmo, Ritual e Responsa in 2007. MV Bill, João Gordo, Paranormal Attack, and Forfun were guest musicians on the album. Ritmo, Ritual e Responsa was nominated for a Latin Grammy Award in 2008. It was the first part of the soundtrack of the film O Magnata, which was written and co-produced by Chorão. The film also included cameos by Chorão and the other Charlie Brown Jr. members. However, O Magnata was a moderate box office success, receiving mixed to negative reviews.

The band released a performance DVD to promote the release of Ritmo, Ritual e Responsa ao Vivo in 2008. However, Pinguim was not in the band by the time the DVD was released; his contract had expired and both parties were uninterested in renewing it. He was replaced by Bruno Graveto.

=== 2010s ===
Camisa 10 Joga Bola Até na Chuva was Charlie Brown Jr.'s ninth album and won the Latin Grammy Award in 2010. It was their final release with Heitor Gomes, who left in 2011 to join CPM 22. "Só os Loucos Sabem", a single from this album, became one of the band's highest-charting hits. Chorão originally wrote "O Dom, a Inteligência e a Voz", another track on the album, for Cássia Eller in 2001, but she died before recording the song.

In 2010, the band composed the opening theme for the variety show Legendários, hosted by Marcos Mion on RecordTV. In 2011 Chorão announced that Marcão and Champignon were returning to the band. Their first recording under this new lineup, Música Popular Caiçara, was released in CD, DVD, and Blu-ray formats. It was recorded in 2011 during performances in Curitiba and Santos. Liminha was its producer and KondZilla was the director. The CD version was released as two volumes: the first concomitantly with the DVD and Blu-ray, and the second four years later, in 2016.

By 2011, Chorão's drug abuse issues began to take their toll on his life and health, causing his divorce from his long-time companion, Graziela "Grazon" Gonçalves. He wrote the song "Céu Azul", included in the band's 2012 release Música Popular Caiçara, for Gonçalves following their divorce.

In 2012, the band began work on a new studio album, La Familia 013. Its first single, "Meu Novo Mundo", premiered in February 2013. On 6 March, Chorão died in his apartment following a cocaine overdose. As a result, the album was left unfinished. After a hiatus, the band resumed work on the unfinished instrumental parts. The band unveiled the album's cover art on 7 July 2013. La Familia 013 was released on 8 October 2013. In 2014, it received the band's fifth Latin Grammy Award nomination.

== After Charlie Brown Jr. ==
Following his first departure from Charlie Brown Jr., Champignon formed the band Revolucionnários. After Revolucionnários broke up, he joined the supergroup Nove Mil Anjos, with Junior Lima of Sandy & Junior fame and Pitty guitarist Peu Sousa. Marcão formed the band TH6, while Renato Pelado became a DJ.

Following the death of Chorão, the remaining band members formed A Banca, a tribute act to both Chorão and Charlie Brown Jr. In August, they released the single "O Novo Passo", which was selected by Rolling Stone Brasil as one of the best Brazilian songs of the year. Nevertheless, some Charlie Brown Jr. fans criticized Champignon for "not respecting Chorão's death" and "not mourning it properly", dismissing him as a "cash-grabber", a "traitor" and a "Judas". Even though Champignon vehemently denied such claims, the constant criticism eventually led him into depression. On 9 September 2013, he shot himself in the head with a .380 ACP pistol.

Except for Thiago Castanho, the existing members of A Banca later regrouped as Bula and went on to form D'Chapas.

== Reunions ==
In January 2019, Marcão Britto, Heitor Gomes, and Pinguim Ruas reformed Charlie Brown Jr. for a series of shows held throughout the year, with guest vocalists such as Dinho Ouro Preto of Capital Inicial, Di Ferrero of NX Zero, Digão of Raimundos, and Supla. Although the reunion had the approval of Chorão's son Alexandre, it was heavily criticized by Chorão's ex-wife Graziela Gonçalves, former guitarist Thiago Castanho, and music critic Mauro Ferreira of G1.

On 1 February 2021, Alexandre announced that the band would reunite once more for the Chorão 50 Tour in Brazil, celebrating what would have been his father's 50th birthday. This time, Thiago Castanho returned as the band's guitarist. Fronted by former Tihuana vocalist Egypcio, the lineup consisted of all former Charlie Brown Jr. band members except for its first drummer Renato Pelado. On 25 October 2021, Marcão and Castanho departed the tour, citing creative divergences with Alexandre.

== Legacy ==
On 13 April 2014, Chorão's son Alexandre organized the Tamo Aí na Atividade Festival in São Bernardo do Campo to celebrate the legacy of Charlie Brown Jr. and the deaths of his father and Champignon. The date coincides with the 22nd anniversary of the band's first live performance in 1992. Although a DVD of the festival was initially planned, Alexandre stated that, due to "bureaucratic reasons", it never came through.

On 29 March 2015, a biographical musical about Chorão, entitled Dias de Luta, Dias de Glória, premiered. It was written by Well Rianc and directed by the sibling duo Bruno and Luiz Sorrentino. Rapper DZ6 starred as Chorão. Despite positive critical reception, Chorão's brother, Ricardo Abrão, lambasted the musical as being "disrespectful" and "inaccurate".

In 2017, Alexandre published the book Eu Estava Lá Também, a compilation of his father's photographs and memoirs, dating from 2005 to 2012. In 2020, Alexandre revealed that, shortly after Chorão's death, he had ordered a diamond made of a lock of his father's hair. Chorão's ex-wife, Graziela Gonçalves, published her memoirs, Se Não Eu, Quem Vai Fazer Você Feliz?, in 2018.

In 2017, Universal Music Group re-released the band's debut, Transpiração Contínua Prolongada, in a special 20th-anniversary deluxe edition. To celebrate what would have been Chorão's 49th birthday and the 20th anniversary of the release of Charlie Brown Jr.'s single "Zóio de Lula" on 9 April 2019, UMG re-issued a special edition containing the song's original version and a new cover featuring Marcelo D2, Hungria Hip Hop, Nação Zumbi, and Maneva.

In 2020, the band's song "Confisco" was included in the soundtrack of the video game Tony Hawk's Pro Skater 1 + 2. On 15 March 2021, Chorão's son struck a deal with Sony Music to release a compilation of outtakes and other rarities by Charlie Brown Jr. The live album/DVD Chegou Quem Faltava, originally recorded during a show in São Paulo in 2011, was released on 13 July 2021.

On 11 April 2023, Universal Music announced a greatest hits compilation to celebrate the 10th anniversary of Chorão's death. On 17 July 2023, Universal Music released a deluxe boxset, simply entitled Charlie Brown Jr., containing the band's entire studio discography plus the video album Ritmo, Ritual e Responsa ao Vivo, which came out in CD format for the first time.

== Films ==
Shortly after Chorão died in 2013, film producers Felipe Elias, Victor Santini Stockler, and Roberta Franco launched a crowdfunding campaign on the website Catarse to finance a documentary, Marginal Alado. The campaign raised R$41,513.00, surpassing its original goal of R$35,000.00. Directed by Felipe Novaes, the documentary premiered at festivals across Brazil in 2019. Its theatrical release in 2020 was postponed to 8 April 2021, due to the COVID-19 pandemic.

In 2017, filmmaker Gabriel Mellin announced he was working on a biopic about Champignon, entitled Champ. Mellin wrote its script with Champignon's widow, Claudia Bossle. On 4 September 2020, actor José Loreto expressed his desire to portray Chorão in a potential biopic, eventually released in 2026 as Chorão – Só os Loucos Sabem.

== Band members ==
=== Last lineup ===
- Chorão – vocals (1992–2013; died 2013)
- Marcão Britto – guitars (1992–2005, 2011–2013)
- Thiago Castanho – guitars (1992–2001, 2005–2013)
- Champignon – bass (1992–2005, 2011–2013; died 2013)
- Bruno Graveto – drums (2008–2013)

=== Former members ===
- Heitor Gomes – bass (2005–2011)
- Renato Pelado – drums (1992–2005)
- Pinguim Ruas – drums (2005–2008)
