= Memorial Necrópole Ecumênica =

Vertical cemetery in Brazil

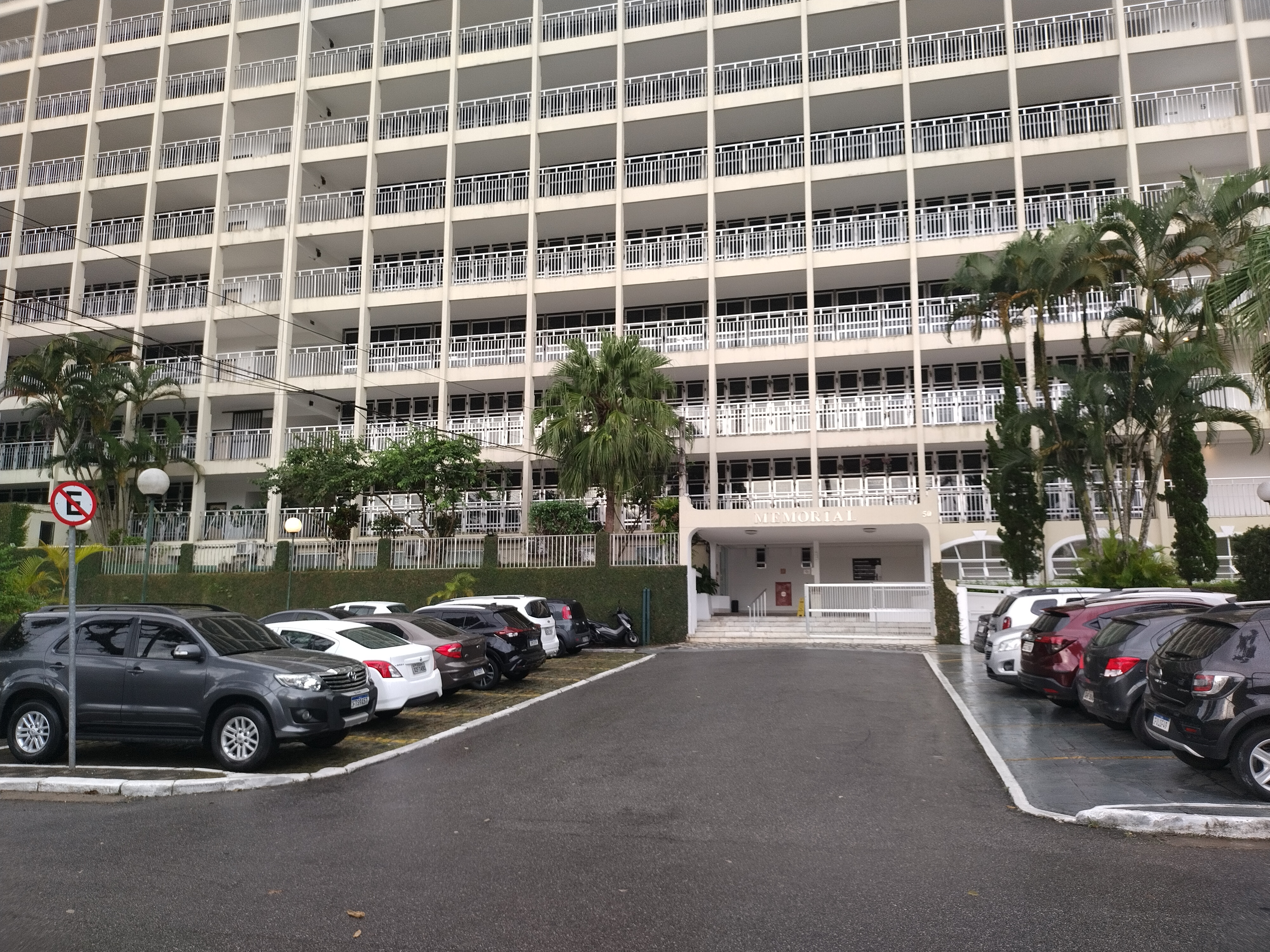
- Interactive map of Memorial Necrópole Ecumênica

Details
- Established: 20 September 1991; 35 years ago
- Location: Santos, São Paulo, Brazil
- Coordinates: 23°56′54″S 46°20′37″W
- Type: Public

The Memorial Necrópole Ecumênica is a Brazilian cemetery. Located in Santos, in the state of São Paulo, its construction began in 1983, and the first burial was on 28 July 1984. It was formally inaugurated on 20 September 1991.

== Background ==
The Memorial Necrópole Ecumênica is 14 stories high and occupies a total of 1.8 hectares of land and contains about 16,000 graves.

It received the Guinness World Records title for the tallest cemetery in the world.

== Notable interments ==
The Brazilian footballer Pelé was buried there on 3 January 2023. The musicians Chorão and Champignon, both of the band Charlie Brown Jr., were also buried there following their deaths in 2013. Also Waldemar Esteves da Cunha, King Momo of Santos, is buried here.
