= Chegou Quem Faltava =

Live album by Charlie Brown Jr.
- Released: July 13, 2021; July 30, 2021 (Versão do Chorão)
- Recorded: March 19, 2011
- Venues: Citibank Hall, São Paulo
- Genres: Rock, Hard rock
- Length: 1:25:00; 1:36:00 (Versão do Chorão)
- Label: Sony Music
- Director: Santiago Ferraz
- Producers: Chorão, Thiago Castanho, Los Brasileros

Charlie Brown Jr. live/video albums chronology
Música Popular Caiçara (2012)	Chegou Quem Faltava (2021)

Alternative cover
- Versão do Chorão front cover

Chegou Quem Faltava (Portuguese for "Who Was Missing Has Arrived") is the third live album and the seventh DVD by Brazilian rock band Charlie Brown Jr. Their first posthumous album since 2013's La Familia 013, it was released on July 13, 2021 (coinciding with the date of the World Rock Day) through Sony Music, their first album on the label since 2009's Camisa 10 Joga Bola Até na Chuva.

The album was originally recorded during a gig at Citibank Hall in São Paulo on March 19, 2011 and was scheduled for a CD and DVD release later that year, but due to line-up changes (the departure of Heitor Gomes and return of Champignon and Marcão Britto) in the middle of that year, it was scrapped and the band left Sony to sign with Radar Records and release Música Popular Caiçara the following year. On March 15, 2021, Alexandre Ferreira Lima Abrão, son of late Charlie Brown Jr.'s vocalist Chorão, struck a deal with Sony Music with the intent of releasing posthumous compilations of outtakes and other rarities by the band, and Chegou Quem Faltava was announced on June 8.

The album was initially released digitally in parts; the first part came out on June 18, containing ten tracks. The second part came out on July 2, containing ten more tracks. The complete album, plus its DVD version, was released on July 13, totaling 29 tracks. The show was also made available for streaming on YouTube. On July 30, the bonus disc Chegou Quem Faltava – Versão do Chorão (or "Chorão's Version") was released, containing additional monologues and Chorão's interactions with the audience, totaling 38 tracks.

== Track listing ==
No.	Title	English title	Length
1.	"Cheia de Vida"	Full of Life	2:22
2.	"O Côro Vai Comê"	Things Will Get Hot	1:45
3.	"Charlie Brown Jr."		1:35
4.	"Gimme o Anel / Sheik"	Gimme the Ring / Sheik	2:37
5.	"Quinta-Feira"	Thursday	1:59
6.	"Tudo Que Ela Gosta de Escutar"	Everything She Likes to Hear	2:24
7.	"Te Levar Daqui"	Taking You Away	2:21
8.	"Rock Star"		3:00
9.	"Me Encontra"	Find Me	3:09
10.	"Pontes Indestrutíveis"	Indestructible Bridges	2:59
11.	"Lutar Pelo Que é Meu"	Fighting for What's Mine	3:56
12.	"Zóio de Lula"	Squid Eyes	4:22
13.	"Dias de Luta, Dias de Glória"	Days of Struggle, Days of Glory	2:21
14.	"Longe de Você"	Far Away from You	3:17
15.	"Céu Azul"	Blue Sky	3:18
16.	"Eu Vim de Santos, Sou Charlie Brown"	I Came from Santos, I'm Charlie Brown	3:42
17.	"Não é Sério"	It Isn't Serious	4:17
18.	"Ela Vai Voltar (Todos os Defeitos de uma Mulher Perfeita)"	She'll Be Back (All the Defects of a Perfect Woman)	2:20
19.	"Só os Loucos Sabem"	Only the Nuts Know	3:15
20.	"Senhor do Tempo"	Lord of Weather	3:21
21.	"Three Little Birds" (Bob Marley and the Wailers cover)		2:13
22.	"Di Sk8 Eu Vou"	Skateboarding I'll Go	4:11
23.	"Papo Reto (Prazer é Sexo, o Resto é Negócio)"	Real Talk (Sex is Pleasure, Everything Else is Business)	3:46
24.	"Tudo Mudar"	For Everything to Change	2:12
25.	"Rubão, o Dono do Mundo"	Rubão, the Owner of the World	2:33
26.	"Mantenha a Dúvida e Espere Até Ouvir Falar de Nós"	Keep the Doubt and Wait Until You Hear from Us	2:18
27.	"O Preço"	The Price	2:59
28.	"Proibida pra Mim (Grazon)"	Forbidden for Me (Grazon)	4:12
29.	"Confisco"	Confiscation	3:01
Total length:			1:25:00

== Personnel ==
- Chorão: vocals
- Thiago Castanho: electric and acoustic guitar and backing vocals
- Heitor Gomes: bass guitar
- Bruno Graveto: drums
