= Música Popular Caiçara =

Live album by Charlie Brown Jr.
- Released: May 2012 (Vol. 1); August 2016 (Vol. 2)
- Recorded: September 23, 2011; October 8, 2011
- Venue: Master Hall, Curitiba; Clube Portuários, Santos
- Genre: Alternative rock, rap rock, skate punk, funk rock, reggae rock
- Length: 47:21 (Volume 1); 42:28 (Volume 2); 1:25:38 (DVD)
- Label: Radar Records
- Director: KondZilla
- Producer: Liminha

Charlie Brown Jr. live/video albums chronology
| Ritmo, Ritual e Responsa ao Vivo (2008) | Música Popular Caiçara (2012) | Chegou Quem Faltava (2021) |

Alternative cover
- Volume 2 front cover

Professional ratings
Review scores
| Source | Rating |
|---|---|
| Galeria Musical | link |
| Notas Musicais | link |

Música Popular Caiçara (Portuguese for "Caiçara Popular Music") is the second live album and the sixth DVD by Brazilian alternative rock band Charlie Brown Jr., released in CD, DVD and Blu-ray formats through Radar Records. Recorded during two gigs in 2011, one in Curitiba and the other in Santos, it was the band's first release since 2004's Tamo Aí na Atividade with original members Marcão and Champignon. Produced by Liminha and directed by KondZilla, the DVD and Blu-ray versions came out first, in 2012; the CD version was split in two volumes, the first of which was released concomitantly with the DVD and Blu-ray versions. The second volume was only released four years later, in 2016.

Initially, the album was recorded at Citibank Hall in São Paulo on March 19, 2011, still as a quartet and with bassist Heitor Gomes. However, due to the return of Marcão and Champignon in the middle of that year, the album's release was cancelled and they broke up with Sony Music, going on independently. However, the same show would be released 10 years later, with the title Chegou Quem Faltava.

Another curiosity is that the band recorded eight more tracks that unfortunately ended up being left out of the CD, DVD and Blu-ray; they are "Só por uma Noite", "Zóio de Lula", "Sino Dourado", "Gimme o Anel", "Sheik", "O Preço" and two new tracks, "De Olhos Abertos" and the title track "Música Popular Caiçara", a tribute to Santos FC.

The studio version of "Céu Azul", which appears in Volume 1 as a bonus track, was included in the soundtracks of the telenovelas Balacobaco and Império. According to vocalist Chorão, he wrote it following his divorce from long-time wife and companion Graziela "Grazon" Gonçalves.

== Critical reception ==
Anderson Nascimento of Galeria Musical gave the album a rating of 4 out of 5 stars. Mauro Ferreira of blog Notas Musicais also gave it the same rating, calling it a release "filled with energy and authenticity".

== Track listing ==
=== Volume 1 (2012) ===
All lyrics are written by Chorão, except for "Coração Satânico" by Marcelo Nova, "Me Deixa" by Marcelo Yuka, and "Não É Sério" by Negra Li; all music is composed by Charlie Brown Jr.

| No. | Title | English title | Length |
|---|---|---|---|
| 1. | "Resolve o Meu Problema Aí" | Solve My Problem | 0:45 |
| 2. | "O Côro Vai Comê!" | Things Will Get Hot! | 1:55 |
| 3. | "Rubão, o Dono do Mundo" | Rubão, the Owner of the World | 2:29 |
| 4. | "Tudo Que Ela Gosta de Escutar" | Everything She Likes to Hear | 2:33 |
| 5. | "Me Encontra" | Find Me | 3:18 |
| 6. | "Pontes Indestrutíveis" | Indestructible Bridges | 3:04 |
| 7. | "Te Levar Daqui" | Taking You Away | 2:28 |
| 8. | "Dias de Luta, Dias de Glória" | Days of Struggle, Days of Glory | 3:06 |
| 9. | "Descubra o Que Há de Errado Com Você" | Find Out What's Wrong with You | 1:40 |
| 10. | "Coração Satânico" (Camisa de Vênus cover; feat. Marcelo Nova) | Satanic Heart | 4:31 |
| 11. | "Me Deixa" (O Rappa cover; feat. Marcelo Falcão) | Leave Me | 5:28 |
| 12. | "Não é Sério" (feat. Marcelo Falcão) | It Isn't Serious | 5:17 |
| 13. | "Proibida pra Mim (Grazon)" (feat. Zeca Baleiro) | Forbidden for Me (Grazon) | 3:51 |
| 14. | "Longe de Você" | Far Away from You | 3:35 |
| 15. | "Céu Azul" (studio version; bonus track) | Blue Sky | 3:20 |

=== Volume 2 (2016) ===
All lyrics are written by Chorão; all music is composed by Charlie Brown Jr., except for "Pipeline" by Brian Carman and Bob Spickard

| No. | Title | English title | Length |
|---|---|---|---|
| 1. | "Céu Azul" | Blue Sky | 3:17 |
| 2. | "Pipeline" (The Chantays cover) | | 1:57 |
| 3. | "Papo Reto (Prazer é Sexo, o Resto é Negócio)" | Real Talk (Sex is Pleasure, Everything Else is Business) | 3:24 |
| 4. | "Só os Loucos Sabem" | Only the Nuts Know | 3:12 |
| 5. | "Ela Vai Voltar (Todos os Defeitos de uma Mulher Perfeita)" | She'll Be Back (All the Defects of a Perfect Woman) | 3:11 |
| 6. | "Lutar Pelo Que é Meu" (incidental: Hoje Eu Só Procuro a Minha Paz) | Fighting for What's Mine | 4:43 |
| 7. | "No Passo a Passo" | Step by Step | 1:34 |
| 8. | "Tudo pro Alto" | Everything High | 3:06 |
| 9. | "Quinta-Feira" | Thursday | 2:04 |
| 10. | "Hoje Eu Acordei Feliz" | I Woke Up Happy Today | 2:30 |
| 11. | "Lugar ao Sol" | A Place by the Sun | 3:16 |
| 12. | "Parta a Mil" (Márcio Mello cover; feat. Márcio Mello) | Going at 1,000km² | 1:24 |
| 13. | "Mantenha a Dúvida e Espere Até Ouvir Falar de Nós" | Keep the Doubt and Wait Until You Hear from Us | 3:03 |
| 14. | "Não Deixe o Mar te Engolir" | Don't Let the Sea Swallow You | 5:50 |

== Personnel ==
=== Charlie Brown Jr. ===
- Chorão: vocals
- Champignon: bass guitar, beatboxing, backing vocals
- Marcão Britto: electric guitar
- Thiago Castanho: electric guitar
- Bruno Graveto: drums
