= Dias de Luta, Dias de Glória =

2005 song by Charlie Brown Jr.

Single by Charlie Brown Jr.

from the album Imunidade Musical
- Released: 2006
- Genre: Alternative rock
- Length: 3:30
- Label: EMI Music
- Composers: Chorão, Thiago Castanho
- Producer: Rick Bonadio

Charlie Brown Jr. singles chronology
"Senhor do Tempo" (2006)	"Dias de Luta, Dias de Glória" (2006)	"Não Viva em Vão" (2007)

"Dias de Luta, Dias de Glória (Ao Vivo)"

Single by Charlie Brown Jr.

from the album Música Popular Caiçara
- Released: 2012
- Genre: Alternative rock
- Length: 3:30
- Label: EMI Music
- Composers: Chorão, Thiago Castanho
- Producer: Liminha

Charlie Brown Jr. singles chronology
"Céu Azul" (2011)	"Dias de Luta, Dias de Glória (Ao Vivo)" (2012)	"Meu Novo Mundo"" (2013)

Dias de Luta, Dias de Glória (Portuguese for "Days of Struggle, Days of Glory") is a song by the Brazilian rock band Charlie Brown Jr., it was original released in 2006 as the four and the last single of the 2005 album Imunidade Musical. in 2012, it was also choiced to be the second single of the live album Música Popular Caiçara.

In 2016, this song was sampled by the Brazilian rapper Gabriel o Pensador in their song "Fé na Luta", that was on the soundtrack of the Soup Opera Pega Pega.

== ITunes Brazil ==
After Chorão's death, the live version of this song, that was presence on the album Música Popular Caiçara, was placing number three between the most fast selling songs of the week in ITunes Brazil.

== Tributes ==
- The Santos FC, the football team which Chorão supported, ended up playing a tribute to him, playing a soccer match with a special shirt that was written "Dias de Luta, Dias de Glória" in their own sleeves (the shirt was later donate to the children of Chorão).
- In the church of the seven day of the dead of Chorão, the four members of the band and his friends ended up singing this song, one of the favorites of the vocalist.

== Certifications ==
Certifications for "Dias de Luta, Dias de Glória"
Region	Certification	Certified units/sales
Brazil (Pro-Música Brasil)	Platinum	100,000^{‡}
^{‡} Sales+streaming figures based on certification alone.
