= Ao Vivo (Charlie Brown Jr. album) =

Video by Charlie Brown Jr.
- Released: 2002
- Recorded: March 23–24, 2002
- Venues: DirecTV Music Hall, São Paulo, Brazil
- Genres: Alternative rock, rap rock, skate punk, funk rock, reggae rock
- Length: 1:28:46
- Label: EMI
- Producer: Tadeu Patolla

Charlie Brown Jr. live/video albums chronology
Ao Vivo (2002)	Acústico MTV: Charlie Brown Jr. (2003)

Ao Vivo (Portuguese for "Live") is the first DVD by Brazilian alternative rock band Charlie Brown Jr. It came out in 2002 through EMI and originally recorded at a gig at the DirecTV Music Hall in São Paulo, later to be broadcast by direct broadcast satellite service provider DirecTV. As extras, the DVD contains the original music videos for "Rubão, o Dono do Mundo", "Não Deixe o Mar te Engolir", "Confisco" and "Hoje Eu Acordei Feliz"; interviews with the bandmembers; backstage footage; pictures of the show; and an extensive making-of.

It sold over 71,000 copies and received a Double Platinum certification by Pro-Música Brasil in 2004.

== Track listing ==
1. "Rubão, o Dono do Mundo"
2. "Tudo Mudar"
3. "Quebra-Mar"
4. "Beatbox"
5. "Confisco"
6. "Tudo que Ela Gosta de Escutar"
7. "Quinta-Feira"
8. "Hoje Eu Acordei Feliz"
9. "Do Surfe"
10. "Pra Mais Tarde Fazermos a Cabeça"
11. "Zóio de Lula"
12. "Ouviu-se Falar"
13. "União"
14. "T.F.D.P."
15. "Sino Dourado"
16. "O Côro Vai Comê!"
17. "Gimme o Anel"
18. "Te Levar"
19. "Como Tudo Deve Ser"
20. "Lugar ao Sol"
21. "Não É Sério"
22. "Proibida pra Mim (Grazon)"
23. "Não Deixe o Mar te Engolir"

== Personnel ==
- Chorão – vocals, guitar on "T.F.D.P."
- Champignon – bass guitar, backing vocals, beatboxing
- Marcão – guitars
- Renato Pelado – drums
