= Bruno Graveto =

Brazilian drummer (born 1982)

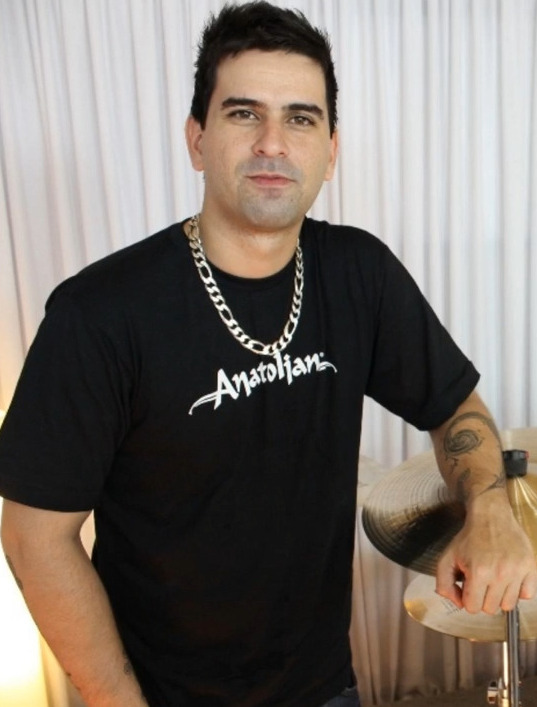
- Graveto in 2012

Background information
- Birth name: Bruno César Bezerra
- Born: December 8, 1982 (age 42); Santos, São Paulo, Brazil
- Genres: Alternative rock, pop rock, rap rock, reggae rock
- Occupation: Drummer
- Instrument: Drums
- Years active: 1994–present

Bruno César Bezerra (born December 8, 1982), better known by his stage name Bruno Graveto, is a Brazilian drummer popular for his work with bands Charlie Brown Jr., A Banca and Strike.

== Biography ==
Bruno César Bezerra was born in Santos, São Paulo on December 8, 1982. He learned how to play the drums when he was 12 years old, and began playing in his first amateur bands around that time; through one of those, Fusion, he met his future Charlie Brown Jr. bandmate Heitor Gomes. By the time he was invited to join Charlie Brown Jr. in 2008, replacing Pinguim Ruas as drummer, he had previously played with bands and artists such as Luccas Trevisani, Pipeline and O Surto. Graveto took part on the recording of the albums Camisa 10 Joga Bola Até na Chuva (which awarded the band its second Latin Grammy Award for Best Portuguese Language Rock or Alternative Album in 2010) and La Familia 013, their final release due to the death of vocalist Chorão. For his work with Charlie Brown Jr., Graveto was nominated for a Multishow Brazilian Music Award, in the "Best Instrumentalist" category, in 2011.

Soon afterwards, he and remaining Charlie Brown Jr. members Champignon, Marcão and Thiago Castanho teamed up with Lena Papini to form A Banca, described as a "tribute act/spiritual successor" to Charlie Brown Jr.; they released a single, "O Novo Passo", in August, before splitting up as well due to the suicide of Champignon one month later. In 2014, the former members of A Banca reformed as Bula, but Graveto's stay with them was brief; at the time he had other commitments with pop rock band Strike, of which he was a part since 2013. Alongside Marcão and Lena Papini, Graveto also played for D'Chapas.

Graveto left Strike in 2019, and around the same time formed the band Cali alongside former Tihuana vocalist Egypcio, Capital Inicial percussionist Fouad Khayat and Leo Rota.

== Discography ==
=== Charlie Brown Jr. ===
- (2009) Camisa 10 Joga Bola Até na Chuva
- (2012) Música Popular Caiçara
- (2013) La Familia 013
- (2021) Chegou Quem Faltava

=== Strike ===
- (2015) Collab
