= La Familia 013 =

Studio album by Charlie Brown Jr.
- Released: October 8, 2013
- Genre: Alternative rock, rap rock, skate punk, funk rock, reggae rock
- Length: 49:23
- Label: Som Livre
- Producer: Tadeu Patolla

Charlie Brown Jr. chronology
Camisa 10 Joga Bola Até na Chuva (2009)	La Familia 013 (2013)

Singles from La Familia 013
- 1. "Meu Novo Mundo" Released: February 2013; 2. "Um Dia a Gente se Encontra" Released: June 2013; 3. "Rock Star" Released: September 2014

Professional ratings
Review scores
Source	Rating
Galeria Musical	link

La Familia 013 (Spanish for "The 013 Family") is the tenth and final studio album by Brazilian pop rock band Charlie Brown Jr. After a series of delays caused by the death of vocalist Chorão and the suicide of bassist Champignon, it was released posthumously through Som Livre on October 8, 2013. The "013" in its title is a reference to the area code of the city of Santos, where the band hails from.

The album was positively received upon its release, with many calling it an "appropriate swan song" for the band. Alexandre Abrão, Chorão's son, called it "[his] father's most autobiographical album", and the band's manager, Samantha Pereira de Jesus, said that it would be "Chorão's lifelong legacy". It sold over 40,000 copies, receiving a Gold certification by Pro-Música Brasil, and in 2014 it was nominated for a Latin Grammy Award for Best Portuguese Language Rock or Alternative Album; the band's fifth release to receive a nomination following Nadando com os Tubarões, Bocas Ordinárias, Imunidade Musical and Ritmo, Ritual e Responsa.

== Background ==
Work on the album began in 2012; its first single to premiere was "Meu Novo Mundo", in February 2013. On March 6, Chorão was found dead in his apartment following a cocaine overdose and the album was left unfinished, although he had finished recording all of his vocal parts prior to his death. After a brief hiatus, the band resumed work on the instrumental parts that had yet to be finished, and the album's cover art was officially unveiled on July 7, 2013. By then, it was slated for a September release.

On September 9, Champignon committed suicide by shooting himself in the head with a .380 ACP pistol; out of respect for his death, the release date was postponed to October. By then, however, the album had already leaked to platforms such as Deezer.

In September 2014 the album's final single, "Rock Star", was released; its music video had its script written by Champignon prior to his death and was directed by Alexandre Abrão.

La Familia 013 was the group's first studio album in over four years since Camisa 10 Joga Bola Até na Chuva (2009), marking the longest gap between two studio albums in their career.

== Critical reception ==
Anderson Nascimento of Galeria Musical gave the album a rating of 3 out of 5 stars, calling it a "decent release worthy of its predecessors". Writing for magazine Caras, Thiago Azanha praised it as "Charlie Brown Jr.'s best, most mature and melancholic release", and Rodrigo Ortega of G1 noticed its "slower, softer and depressing" tone, and Chorão's "whispering" vocals.

== Track listing ==
All lyrics are written by Chorão

No.	Title	Music	English title	Length
1.	"Um Dia a Gente se Encontra"	Chorão, Thiago Castanho	Someday We'll Meet Again	3:04
2.	"Fina Arte"	Chorão, Marcão	Fine Art	3:02
3.	"Cheia de Vida"	Castanho, Chorão	Full of Life	2:42
4.	"Meu Novo Mundo"	Castanho, Chorão	My New World	3:27
5.	"Do Jeito que Eu Gosto, do Jeito que Eu Quero"	Bruno Graveto, Castanho, Champignon, Chorão, Marcão	The Way I Like It, the Way I Want It	4:27
6.	"Rock Star"	Castanho, Chorão		3:18
7.	"Vem Ser Minha"	Castanho, Chorão	Come and Be Mine	4:38
8.	"Hoje Sou Eu que Não Mais te Quero"	Castanho, Chorão	Today I'm the One Who Doesn't Want You	5:03
9.	"Camisa Preta"	Castanho, Champignon, Chorão, Graveto, Marcão	Black Shirt	4:16
10.	"Vou Me Embriagar de Você"	Castanho, Chorão	I'll Get Drunk on You	4:25
11.	"A Mais Linda do Bar"	Castanho, Chorão	The Prettiest Girl in the Bar	3:34
12.	"Samba Triste"	Castanho, Chorão	Sad Samba	4:50
13.	"Contrastes da Vida"	Castanho, Chorão	Contrasts of Life	2:42

== Personnel ==
Charlie Brown Jr.

- Chorão – vocals, electric guitar (tracks 3, 6, 9 and 11), classical guitar (track 13)
- Champignon – bass guitar, beatboxing
- Marcão – electric guitar, classical guitar
- Thiago Castanho – electric guitar, classical guitar, keyboards
- Bruno Graveto – drums

Production

- Tadeu Patolla – direction
- Lampadinha – mastering
