= Imunidade Musical =

Studio album by Charlie Brown Jr.
- Released: August 23, 2005
- Genre: Alternative rock, rap rock, skate punk, funk rock, reggae rock
- Length: 73:27
- Label: EMI
- Producer: Rick Bonadio

Charlie Brown Jr. chronology
Tamo Aí na Atividade (2004)	Imunidade Musical (2005)	Ritmo, Ritual e Responsa (2007)

Singles from Imunidade Musical
- 1. "Lutar pelo que É Meu" Released: August 2005; 2. "Pra Não Dizer que Não Falei das Flores" Released: February 2006; 3. "Ela Vai Voltar (Todos os Defeitos de uma Mulher Perfeita)" Released: March 2006; 4. "Senhor do Tempo" Released: August 2006

Professional ratings
Review scores
Source	Rating
Galeria Musical	link

Imunidade Musical (Portuguese for "Musical Immunity") is the seventh studio album by Brazilian alternative rock band Charlie Brown Jr., released on August 23, 2005 through EMI. Following a brief hiatus after the departure of former bandmembers Champignon, Marcão and Renato Pelado, it was the band's first release with its new line-up of bassist Heitor Gomes, drummer/beatboxer Pinguim Ruas and guitarist Thiago Castanho, an original founding member who had parted ways with Charlie Brown Jr. in 2001 following the release of their third album, Nadando com os Tubarões.

It spawned four hit singles, the most noteworthy being "Lutar pelo que É Meu" (used as the theme song of the 13th season of long-running soap opera Malhação), "Ela Vai Voltar (Todos os Defeitos de uma Mulher Perfeita)" (featured in the 21st season of the soap opera but not included in its soundtrack CD) and "Pra Não Dizer que Não Falei das Flores", a cover of the famous anti-dictatorship song written by Geraldo Vandré in the late 1960s. "Aquela Paz" was re-recorded from their 1997 debut Transpiração Contínua Prolongada. Counting with guest appearances by Rappin' Hood, hip hop group Sacramento MCs and Nigerian-born musician Osas Destiny (at the time still a member of group Conexão Baixada and credited by his former stage name JamaicaBoy), the album was received positively upon its release, with many praising the new line-up as a "breath of fresh air". It sold over 100,000 copies, receiving a Gold certification by Pro-Música Brasil.

In 2006, Imunidade Musical was nominated for a Latin Grammy Award for Best Portuguese Language Rock or Alternative Album; it was the band's third album to receive a nomination following Nadando com os Tubarões and Bocas Ordinárias. The same year, the music video for "Ela Vai Voltar (Todos os Defeitos de uma Mulher Perfeita)" received nominations for the MTV Video Music Brazil award in the "Video of the Year", "Best Rock Video" and "Best Art Direction in a Video" categories; director Leonardo Domingues was nominated in the "Best Direction in a Video" category.

== Critical reception ==
Anderson Nascimento of Galeria Musical gave the album a positive rating of 4 out of 5 stars, praising it as one of the most "complete and inspired" releases by Charlie Brown Jr. but criticizing its length.

== Track listing ==
All lyrics are written by Chorão, except where noted

No.	Title	Lyrics	Music	English title	Length
1.	"Too Fast to Live, Too Young to Die"	Instrumental	Thiago Castanho		0:39
2.	"No Passo a Passo"		Chorão	Step by Step	2:27
3.	"Lutar pelo que É Meu"		Castanho, Chorão	Fighting for What's Mine	3:20
4.	"É Quente"		Chorão	It's Hot	2:28
5.	"Onde Não Existe a Paz, Não Existe o Amor"		Chorão	Where There's No Peace, There's No Love	4:07
6.	"Ela Vai Voltar (Todos os Defeitos de uma Mulher Perfeita)"		Castanho	She'll Be Back (All the Defects of a Perfect Woman)	3:07
7.	"O Mundo Explodiu Lá Fora"		Castanho, Chorão	The World Exploded Out There	3:00
8.	"Senhor do Tempo"		Chorão, Heitor Gomes	Lord of Weather	3:22
9.	"Liberdade Acima de Tudo"		Castanho, Chorão	Freedom Above All	3:07
10.	"Pra Não Dizer que Não Falei das Flores" (Geraldo Vandré cover)	Geraldo Vandré	Geraldo Vandré	So I Can't Say I Didn't Talk About the Flowers	5:26
11.	"Abrir Seus Olhos"		Castanho, Chorão	To Open Your Eyes	1:57
12.	"Green Goes" (feat. Sacramento MCs)	Chorão, Sacramento MCs	Castanho, Chorão		4:39
13.	"I Feel So Good Today"		Chorão		4:08
14.	"Peso da Batida do Errado que Deu Certo"		Chorão	Weight of the Beat of the Wrong That Made a Right	2:06
15.	"Aquela Paz"		Castanho	That Peace	2:56
16.	"Cada Cabeça Falante Tem sua Tromba de Elefante" (feat. Rappin' Hood)	Chorão, Rappin' Hood	Castanho, Chorão	Every Talking Head Has Its Elephant Trunk	4:28
17.	"Onde Está o Mundo Bom? (Living in L.A.)"		Chorão	Where's the Good World? (Living in L.A.)	2:23
18.	"O Nosso Blues"		Chorão	Our Blues	5:27
19.	"O Futuro É um Labirinto pra Quem Não Sabe o que Quer"		Castanho, Chorão, Gomes	The Future's a Labyrinth for Those Who Don't Know What They Want	2:58
20.	"Na Palma da Mão (O Ragga da Baixada)" (feat. JamaicaBoy)	Chorão, Tubarão	Chorão	In the Palm of the Hand (The Ragga of the Baixada)	5:19
21.	"Skate Vibration"		Chorão		2:03
22.	"Criando Anticorpos"	Instrumental	Castanho	Growing Antibodies	0:53
23.	"Dias de Luta, Dias de Glória"		Castanho	Days of Struggle, Days of Glory	2:25

== Personnel ==
Charlie Brown Jr.

- Chorão – vocals
- Heitor Gomes – bass guitar
- Thiago Castanho – electric guitar
- Pinguim Ruas – drums, beatboxing

Additional musicians

- JamaicaBoy – vocals on "Na Palma da Mão (O Ragga da Baixada)"
- Rappin' Hood – vocals on "Cada Cabeça Falante Tem sua Tromba de Elefante"
- Sacramento MCs – vocals on "Green Goes"
- Rick Bonadio – piano on "Senhor do Tempo" and "Dias de Luta, Dias de Glória"

== Certifications ==
Region	Certification	Certified units/sales
Brazil (Pro-Música Brasil)	Gold	50,000^{*}
^{*} Sales figures based on certification alone.
