= O Novo Passo =

2013 song by A Banca

Single by A Banca
- Released: August 24, 2013
- Recorded: 2013
- Genre: Alternative rock; skate punk; rap rock; pop rock
- Length: 3:45
- Label: Self-released
- Songwriter: Champignon

"O Novo Passo" (Portuguese for "The New Step") is a single by Brazilian alternative rock band A Banca. It initially debuted on August 24, 2013 through radio station Jovem Pan FM, but was played live by the band for the first time during a show in São Vicente the day prior. On September 2 (exactly one week before the suicide of frontman Champignon), the song was made available on streaming platforms. In an interview, the band claimed that the lyrics are supposed to deliver a message of "new beginnings, courage and love", and the "importance of union".

The song, which was chosen by Rolling Stone Brasil one of the best of the year, was the band's only official release, and the last song ever written by Champignon in his lifetime.

== Personnel ==
- Champignon – vocals, beatboxing
- Marcão – electric guitar
- Thiago Castanho – electric guitar
- Bruno Graveto – drums
- Helena "Lena" Papini – bass guitar
