= Camisa 10 Joga Bola Até na Chuva =

Studio album by Charlie Brown Jr.
- Released: September 26, 2009
- Studio: Estúdio Midas
- Genre: Brazilian rock
- Length: 58:12
- Label: Sony Music
- Producer: Rick Bonadio

Charlie Brown Jr. chronology
Ritmo, Ritual e Responsa (2007)	Camisa 10 Joga Bola Até na Chuva (2009)	La Familia 013 (2013)

Singles from Camisa 10 Joga Bola Até na Chuva
- 1. "Me Encontra" Released: August 30, 2009; 2. "Só os Loucos Sabem" Released: March 2010

Camisa 10 Joga Bola Até na Chuva (Portuguese for "Shirt #10 Will Play Soccer Even in the Rain") is the ninth studio album by Brazilian rock band Charlie Brown Jr. Released on September 26, 2009 through Sony Music, it was the band's only release through the label (until the posthumous Chegou Quem Faltava in 2021), their first with new drummer Bruno Graveto, and their final one with bassist Heitor Gomes, who left in 2011 after his contract expired to join CPM 22. Explaining the title, vocalist Chorão said that it came to him after he and his friend, Marcelo Falcão of O Rappa, met during a flight and saw in a magazine a picture of a footballer under the rain; he then thought it was a "fitting metaphor" on how people live their lives. The number 10 is a reference to the fact that it is their tenth album overall if the live release Acústico MTV is counted, and also nods to the iconic #10 shirt worn by footballer Pelé.

The album spawned two hit singles: "Me Encontra" and "Só os Loucos Sabem", one of the band's most famous compositions. Also notable is "O Dom, a Inteligência e a Voz"; Chorão originally wrote it in 2001 as a gift to his friend, fellow singer Cássia Eller, to be included on her sixth studio album, Dez de Dezembro. However, she died before she could record the song, and the album was released posthumously.

In 2010, Camisa 10 Joga Bola Até na Chuva won a Latin Grammy Award for Best Portuguese Language Rock or Alternative Album; the band's second release to win the award following Tamo Aí na Atividade. Selling over 100,000 copies, it received a Platinum certification by Pro-Música Brasil.

== Track listing ==
All lyrics are written by Chorão; all music is composed by Charlie Brown Jr..

No.	Title	English title	Length
1.	"Dona do Meu Pensamento"	Lady of My Thoughts	3:59
2.	"Me Encontra"	Find Me	3:31
3.	"Só os Loucos Sabem"	Only the Nuts Know	3:31
4.	"Inabalavelmente"	Unwaveringly	4:25
5.	"Só Existe o Agora"	There Is Only Now	4:28
6.	"Só pra Vadiar"	Just to Relax	4:05
7.	"Puro Sangue"	Pure-Blooded	4:08
8.	"O Dom, a Inteligência e a Voz"	The Gift, the Intelligence and the Voice	3:09
9.	"Os Cortes"	The Cuts	4:23
10.	"Uma Só Vida pra Viver, Tenho Sede, Nela Eu Vou"	Only One Life to Live, I'm Thirsty, I'll Ride It	5:02
11.	"Viver Dias de Sol"	Living Sunny Days	4:19
12.	"Comigo Ninguém Tira Onda"	No One Messes with Me	2:59
13.	"Camisa 10 Joga Bola Até na Chuva (Bomba Sônica)"	Shirt #10 Will Play Soccer Even in the Rain (Sonic Bomb)	3:10

== Personnel ==
Charlie Brown Jr.

- Chorão – vocals
- Thiago Castanho – electric guitar
- Heitor Gomes – bass guitar
- Bruno Graveto – drums

Production

- Rick Bonadio – production, mixing, mastering
- Paulo Anhaia – recording, editing
- Nilton Baloni – studio assistant
- Lampadinha – mastering

== Certifications ==
Region	Certification	Certified units/sales
Brazil (Pro-Música Brasil)	Platinum	100,000^{‡}
^{‡} Sales+streaming figures based on certification alone.
