= Ritmo, Ritual e Responsa =

Studio album by Charlie Brown Jr.
- Released: November 15, 2007
- Studios: Estúdio Midas; Estúdio Mega; Estúdio Digital Grooves
- Genres: Alternative rock, rap rock, skate punk, nu metal, funk rock, reggae rock
- Length: 1:18:38
- Label: EMI
- Producers: Chorão, Thiago Castanho

Charlie Brown Jr. chronology
Imunidade Musical (2005)	Ritmo, Ritual e Responsa (2007)	Camisa 10 Joga Bola Até na Chuva (2009)

Singles from Ritmo, Ritual e Responsa
- 1. "Não Viva em Vão" Released: April 9, 2007; 2. "Pontes Indestrutíveis" Released: 2007; 3. "Be Myself" Released: 2008; 4. "Uma Criança com Seu Olhar" Released: 2008; 5. "Direto e Reto Sempre" Released: 2009

Professional ratings
Review scores
Source	Rating
Galeria Musical	link
G1	4/10 link
Notas Musicais	link

Ritmo, Ritual e Responsa (Portuguese for "Rhythm, Ritual and Responsibility") is the eighth studio album by Brazilian alternative rock band Charlie Brown Jr. Their final studio release with drummer Pinguim Ruas, who left the band one year later, it came out on November 15, 2007, through EMI. Billed as the first part of the soundtrack of the film O Magnata (even though a second part was never formally planned or released), written and co-produced by vocalist Chorão, and serving as somewhat of a concept album inspired by key events of the film, it counted with guest appearances by bands and artists such as MV Bill, João Gordo, Paranormal Attack, Forfun, Sacramento MCs and Markon Lobotomia.

The album's first single, "Não Viva em Vão", was released in advance on April 9, 2007, coinciding with Chorão's 37th birthday. It was followed by the hits "Pontes Indestrutíveis", "Be Myself" and "Uma Criança com Seu Olhar"; the first two were included in the soundtracks of Rede Globo's telenovelas Amor à Vida (2013–2014) and Duas Caras (2007–2008), respectively. The music video for "Não Viva em Vão" received a nomination for the MTV Video Music Brazil award in the "Video of the Year" category in 2007; the following year, "Pontes Indestrutíveis" was nominated in the "Video of the Year" and "Hit of the Year" categories.

In 2008, Ritmo, Ritual e Responsa was nominated for a Latin Grammy Award for Best Portuguese Language Rock or Alternative Album; the band's fourth release to receive a nomination following Nadando com os Tubarões, Bocas Ordinárias and Imunidade Musical.

== Critical reception ==
Anderson Nascimento of Galeria Musical gave the album a positive rating of 3 out of 5 stars. Conversely, Débora Miranda, writing for G1, rated it with a 4 out of 10, calling it a heavier and more eclectic album sonority-wise but criticizing it as being "lyrically repetitive". Mauro Ferreira of blog Notas Musicais gave the album a mixed review, rating it with 3 stars out of 5 and calling it a "good-intentioned, motivational release with self-help undertones", finishing by comparing Chorão to a priest preaching the good for his fans.

== Track listing ==
All lyrics are written by Chorão, except where noted.

No.	Title	Lyrics	Music	English title	Length
1.	"Pontes Indestrutíveis"		Chorão, Edu Ribeiro, Heitor Gomes, Pinguim Ruas, Thiago Castanho	Indestructible Bridges	3:32
2.	"O que Ela Gosta É de Barriga"		Castanho, Chorão	What She Likes Is Belly	1:51
3.	"Não Viva em Vão"		Castanho, Chorão	Don't Live in Vain	3:54
4.	"Ritmo, Ritual e Responsa"		Castanho, Chorão, Gomes, Pinguim	Rhythm, Ritual and Responsibility	3:45
5.	"Be Myself"		Castanho, Chorão		4:33
6.	"Uma Criança com Seu Olhar"		Castanho, Chorão, Gomes, Pinguim	A Child with Your Eyes	4:13
7.	"Liberdade É Tudo"	Instrumental	Castanho, Chorão, Gomes, Pinguim	Freedom Is Everything	1:43
8.	"O Universo a Nosso Favor" (feat. Forfun)	Chorão, Forfun	Castanho, Chorão	The Universe in Our Favor	4:22
9.	"Ninguém Entende Você"		Castanho, Chorão	Nobody Understands You	3:09
10.	"Quando Tudo Aconteceu"	Instrumental	Castanho, Chorão, Gomes, Pinguim	When Everything Happened	2:15
11.	"Beco sem Saída"		Castanho, Chorão	Dead End	3:57
12.	"Sem Medo da Escuridão" (feat. MV Bill)	Chorão, MV Bill	Castanho, Chorão, Gomes, Pinguim	Without Fear of the Dark	5:44
13.	"Nua, Linda e Inigualável"		Castanho, Zyz	Naked, Beautiful and Unequaled	3:10
14.	"Vida de Magnata" (feat. João Gordo)		Castanho, Chorão	The Life of a Tycoon	2:44
15.	"Que Espécie de Vermes São Vocês?" (feat. Markon Lobotomia)	Chorão, Lobotomia	Castanho, Chorão, Gomes, Pinguim	What Kind of Worms Are You?	2:03
16.	"Buscando um Novo Rumo"	Instrumental	Castanho, Chorão, Gomes, Pinguim	Searching for a New Way	2:41
17.	"Vivendo a Vida Numa Louca Viagem" (feat. Sacramento MCs)		Castanho, Chorão	Living Life in a Crazy Trip	5:20
18.	"Curva de Hill"		Castanho, Chorão, Gomes, Pinguim	Hill Curve	1:36
19.	"Direto e Reto Sempre"		Castanho, Chorão, Gomes, Pinguim	Always Straight to the Point	2:46
20.	"Skateboard Amor Eterno" (feat. Sacramento MCs)	Chorão, Sacramento MCs	Castanho, Chorão	Eternal Love Skateboarding	3:54
21.	"Café Foundation"	Instrumental	Gomes		1:23
22.	"Paranormal" (feat. Paranormal Attack)		Castanho, Chorão, Xangaii		8:12

Bonus track
No.	Title	English title	Length
23.	"Senhor do Tempo" (live in São Paulo, 2007)	Lord of Weather	3:47

== Personnel ==
Charlie Brown Jr.

- Chorão – vocals
- Heitor Gomes – bass guitar
- Thiago Castanho – acoustic and electric guitars
- Pinguim Ruas – drums

Additional musicians

- MV Bill – additional vocals on "Sem Medo da Escuridão"
- Forfun – vocals and performance on "O Universo a Nosso Favor"
- Sacramento MCs – additional vocals on "Vivendo a Vida numa Louca Viagem" and "Skateboard Amor Eterno"
- Markon Lobotomia – additional vocals on "Que Espécie de Vermes São Vocês?"
- João Gordo – additional vocals on "Vida de Magnata"
- Paranormal Attack – programming on "Paranormal"

== Certifications ==
Region	Certification	Certified units/sales
Brazil (Pro-Música Brasil)	Gold	50,000^{‡}
^{‡} Sales+streaming figures based on certification alone.
