= Forfun =

Brazilian alternative rock band

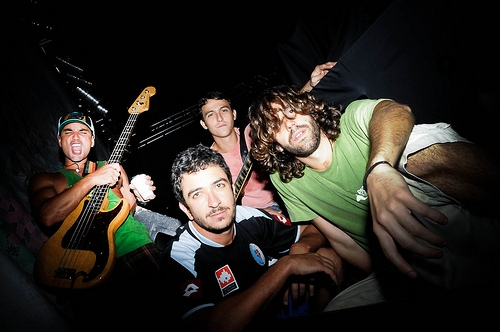
- A promotional picture of the band from 2010

Background information
- Origin: Rio de Janeiro, Brazil
- Genres: Alternative rock; reggae rock; skate punk; pop rock; pop-punk; melodic hardcore
- Years active: 2001–2015
- Labels: Deckdisc
- Past members: Danilo Cutrim; Vítor Isensee; Nicholas Christ; Rodrigo Costa; Bruno Tizé

Forfun was a Brazilian alternative rock band which reached the peak of its popularity in the mid- to late 2000s. Formed in Rio de Janeiro in 2001, their initial line-up comprised vocalist/guitarist Danilo Cutrim, bassist Vítor Isensee and drummer Bruno Tizé. By 2002, Tizé left the band and was replaced by Nicholas Christ, while Isensee switched his position with Rodrigo Costa to become second guitarist. Their first shows were frequently attended by the sons of then-Deputy (and future President) Jair Bolsonaro, Eduardo and Carlos, who were personal friends of the bandmembers; Eduardo would later cameo in the music video for "História de Verão". They released in 2003 the demo album Das Pistas de Skate às Pistas de Dança, which was a significant underground hit, and in 2005 their official debut, Teoria Dinâmica Gastativa, produced by Liminha, came out through Universal Music Group.

Following the release of Polisenso (2008) and Alegria Compartilhada (2011), which counted with guest appearances by rapper Black Alien and big band Funk Como Le Gusta, the group reached further proeminence due to their nominations to the MTV Video Music Brazil award in 2006, 2009, 2011 and 2012; in the 2005 edition, they performed a cover of Ultraje a Rigor's "Nós Vamos Invadir Sua Praia" alongside Leela, Ramirez and Dibob, with whom they would develop a strong friendship. In 2012 they collaborated on the song "Rio Porque Tô no Rio", described as an ode to Rio de Janeiro.

In 2007, they collaborated on the eighth album by Santos-based band Charlie Brown Jr., Ritmo, Ritual e Responsa, co-writing and performing the track "O Universo a Nosso Favor". On February 13 and 14 of the same year, they participated in a show organized by MTV Brasil alongside Fresno, Hateen, Moptop and NX Zero; a live album of the performance would be released soon after, titled MTV ao Vivo: 5 Bandas de Rock.

In 2013, they released the DVD Forfun ao Vivo no Circo Voador, recorded on December 20, 2012, and which counted with guest appearances by their friends from Dibob, Toni Garrido of Cidade Negra and Dead Fish vocalist Rodrigo Lima. The DVD contains three studio tracks recorded as extras: "Ahorita", "Malícia" and "Terra de Cego".

Their final studio album, Nu, came out in 2014. The following year they announced they would be ceasing their activities; Rodrigo Costa would elaborate in a 2019 interview that the major reason of the band's end was that he was veering from their initial "left-wing ideals", causing a rift between him and his colleagues. In 2016, Cutrim, Isensee and Christ formed a new project, Braza, and alongside former members of Dibob and Ramirez, Costa founded the group Tivoli.

In 2022, they released the DVD Forfun ao Vivo na Fundição, originally recorded on December 12, 2015, at the last show of their farewell tour.

After nine years, on December 6, 2023, the band and its members announced on their social media the return of Forfun for the Nós tour, with shows scheduled for August 2024 in the cities of São Paulo and Rio de Janeiro.

In 2025, the band was announced as an act at the second edition of the itinerant festival I Wanna Be Tour, performing on August 23 in Curitiba and on August 30 in São Paulo. In addition to the festival, they also held a special show celebrating the 20th anniversary of the album Teoria Dinâmica Gastativa in Rio de Janeiro on September 26, featuring special guests CPM 22, Dead Fish, Lucas Silveira, and Di Ferrero.

== Discography ==
- (2003) Das Pistas de Skate às Pistas de Dança (demo)
- (2005) Teoria Dinâmica Gastativa
- (2008) Polisenso
- (2011) Alegria Compartilhada
- (2013) Forfun ao Vivo no Circo Voador (also available in DVD)
- (2014) Nu
- (2022) Forfun ao Vivo na Fundição (also available in DVD; recorded in 2015)
