= Pinguim Ruas =

Brazilian drummer (born 1975)

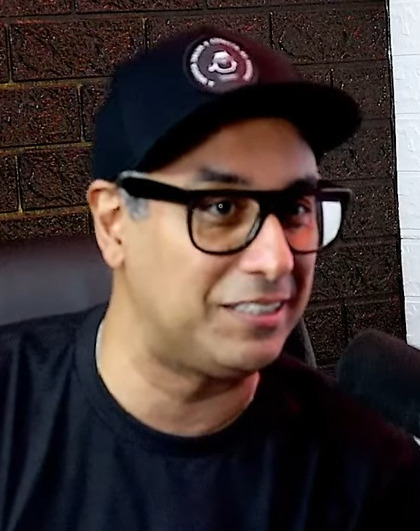
- Pinguim in 2024

Background information
- Birth name: André Luís Ruas
- Born: January 29, 1975 (age 50); Santos, São Paulo, Brazil
- Genres: Alternative rock, pop rock, rap rock, reggae rock, electronic music
- Occupation(s): Drummer, beatboxer
- Instrument(s): Vocals, drums
- Years active: 1987–present

André Luís "Pinguim" Ruas (born January 29, 1975) is a Brazilian drummer and beatboxer primarily known for his tenure with famous alternative rock band Charlie Brown Jr. from 2005 to 2008.

== Biography ==
André Luís Ruas was born in Santos, São Paulo on January 29, 1975. His stage name, "Pinguim" (Portuguese for "penguin"), comes from a childhood nickname owing to a T-shirt with a penguin drawing on it he constantly wore; his friends used to joke that he was very similar in physical appearance to the aforementioned penguin, and so the name stuck. He officially began his musical career in 1987, serving a drummer for bands such as Expresso Noturno, Mestra and Aldeia; through one of those projects he met his future Charlie Brown Jr. bandmate Thiago Castanho.

In 2005, following a major reshuffle on the line-up of Charlie Brown Jr., he was invited by vocalist Chorão to join the band, replacing original members Renato Pelado and Champignon as drummer and beatboxer, respectively. At the time with his own band, Revolucionnários, Champignon initially criticized his replacement as just an attempt to copy him and his style, but would eventually apologize for his statements, befriending Pinguim; he was present in Champignon's funeral following his suicide on September 9, 2013, claiming that "he always seemed to be a happy person".

During his three-year tenure with Charlie Brown Jr. Pinguim took part on the recording of the albums Imunidade Musical and Ritmo, Ritual e Responsa (which received nominations for the Latin Grammy Award for Best Portuguese Language Rock or Alternative Album in 2006 and 2008 respectively), and the DVD Ritmo, Ritual e Responsa ao Vivo, released shortly after his departure from the band following the expiration of his contract and the lack of interest of both parties on renewing it. Alongside his Charlie Brown Jr. bandmates he also cameod as himself in the 2007 film O Magnata, written and co-produced by Chorão.

Following his work with Charlie Brown Jr. he founded in 2013 the electronic music duo Beach Beat alongside singer Beto Gerônimo, and for a brief time in 2014 played for rap rock group Conexão Baixada. Also in 2014 he joined Bula with also former Charlie Brown Jr. member Marcão, replacing original drummer Bruno Graveto (in a somewhat ironic turn of events, Graveto was Pinguim's replacement as Charlie Brown Jr.'s drummer in 2008). In 2015 he joined Áries alongside Lu Andrade of Rouge.

In 2017, he and Marcão were guest musicians on Bruno Thadeu's song "A Miséria Comprou a Razão (Ouro Vira Areia)".

In 2019, he, Marcão and Heitor Gomes reunited Charlie Brown Jr. for a controversial series of shows around Brazil, with guest vocalists. The band was reunited again in 2021 for a special tour celebrating Chorão's 50th birthday.

== Influences ==
Pinguim stated in a 2015 interview that some of his greatest influences as a drummer were João Barone (Os Paralamas do Sucesso), Charles Gavin (Titãs), Chad Smith (Red Hot Chili Peppers), Dave Weckl, John Bonham (Led Zeppelin), Billy Cobham, Carter Beauford (Dave Matthews Band) and Simon Phillips.

== Discography ==
=== Charlie Brown Jr. ===
- (2005) Imunidade Musical
- (2007) Ritmo, Ritual e Responsa

=== Bula ===
- (2014) Não Estamos Sozinhos
- (2019) Realidade Placebo
- (2023) Indivíduo Coletivo
