= Heitor Gomes =

Brazilian bassist (born 1981)

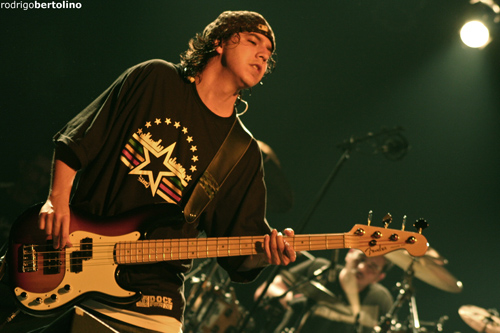
- Gomes performing with Charlie Brown Jr. in Guarulhos, 2008

Background information
- Born: Heitor Vilela Gomes; April 8, 1981 (age 45); Santos, São Paulo, Brazil
- Genres: Alternative rock, pop rock, rap rock, reggae rock
- Occupations: Bassist, songwriter
- Instrument: Bass guitar
- Years active: 2000–present

Heitor Vilela Gomes (born April 8, 1981) is a Brazilian bassist and songwriter, best known for his work with bands Charlie Brown Jr. and CPM 22.

== Biography ==
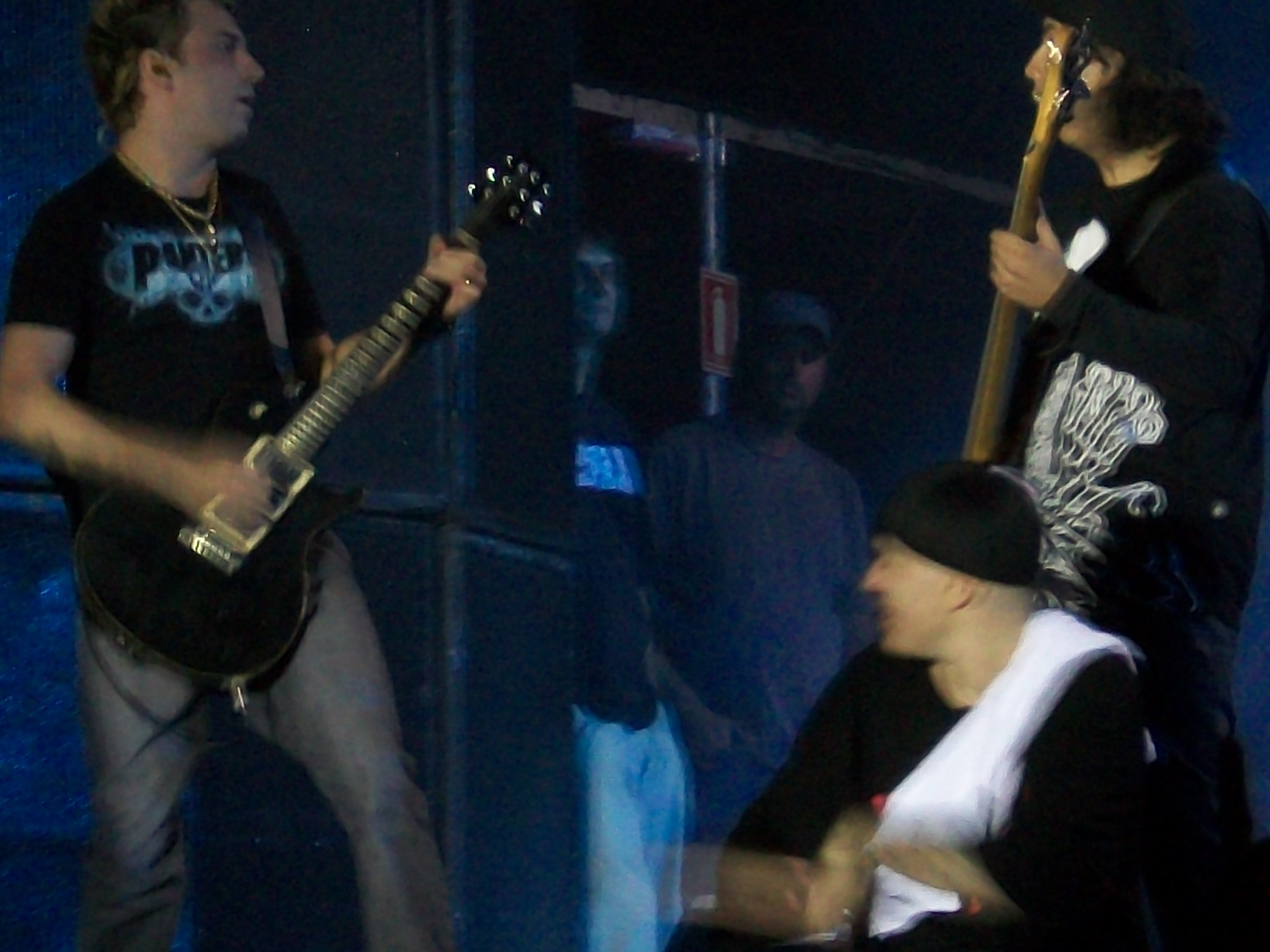
From left to right: Thiago Castanho, Chorão and Gomes at a Charlie Brown Jr. show in 2011

Heitor Vilela Gomes was born in Santos, São Paulo on April 8, 1981, to famous bassist Chico Gomes, who also encouraged him to learn how to play the instrument when he was 15 years old. He would play in many amateur bands during his youth; through one of them, Fusion, he would meet his future Charlie Brown Jr. bandmate Bruno Graveto. However, it wouldn't be until 2000 when he formed his first professional band, Olhos de Carla, with whom he recorded an EP.

In 2005, following a major reshuffle on the line-up of Charlie Brown Jr., he was invited by vocalist Chorão to join the band, replacing original member Champignon as bassist. During his six-year tenure with the band Gomes took part on the recording of the albums Imunidade Musical, Ritmo, Ritual e Responsa and Camisa 10 Joga Bola Até na Chuva; the first two received nominations for the Latin Grammy Award for Best Portuguese Language Rock or Alternative Album in 2006 and 2008, and the latter won the award in 2010. Alongside his Charlie Brown Jr. bandmates he also cameod as himself in the 2007 film O Magnata, written and co-produced by Chorão.

Gomes left Charlie Brown Jr. in 2011 after being invited to join CPM 22; he took part in the recording of two live albums, CPM 22 – Acústico and CPM 22 – Ao Vivo no Rock in Rio, before leaving it in 2016. In 2015 he founded the instrumental project Gomes do 8.

Briefly in 2017 he was a member of rap rock group Pavilhão 9, taking part in the recording of their album Antes, Durante, Depois.

In 2019, he, Marcão and Pinguim Ruas reunited Charlie Brown Jr. for a controversial series of shows around Brazil, with guest vocalists. The band was reunited again in 2021 for a special tour celebrating Chorão's 50th birthday.

In February 2020 he performed a special show in Santos to celebrate the 20th anniversary of his musical career.

== Discography ==
=== Charlie Brown Jr. ===
- (2005) Imunidade Musical
- (2007) Ritmo, Ritual e Responsa
- (2009) Camisa 10 Joga Bola Até na Chuva
- (2021) Chegou Quem Faltava

=== CPM 22 ===
- (2013) CPM 22 Acústico
- (2016) CPM 22 ao Vivo no Rock in Rio

=== Pavilhão 9 ===
- (2017) Antes, Durante, Depois
