= Paranormal Attack =

Trance music group

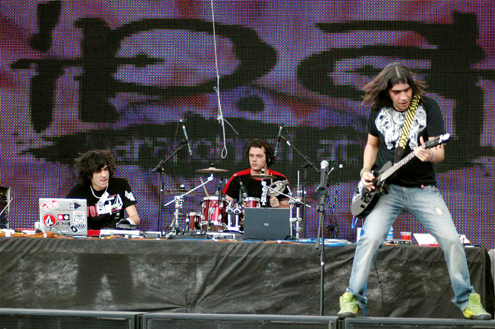

Background information
- Origin: Portugal
- Genres: Psychedelic trance, electronic music, electronic rock
- Years active: 2001–present
- Labels: Chemical Crew Records
- Members: Rui Oliveira (Xangaii); Gonçalo Miranda; Lucas
- Website: www.paranormalattackmusic.com

Paranormal Attack is a psychedelic trance group formed by Rui Oliveira (Xangaii), Gonçalo Miranda and Lucas, originally from Portugal. They have been producing psy-trance since 2001.

== Discography ==
Albums:

- Phenomenon (2006)
- Walking in the Sun (2007) (unofficial album made by the fans over the Internet)
- Phenomenon (Deluxe Edition) (2013)

EPs:

- My Beats Gonna Rock You - Wired Music 2012
- Secret Weapons ( vs Skazi ) - Wired Music 2012
- Soldiers - Global Army Music 2014
- Cobra Gypsies - Fxxk Tomorrow 2016

Singles:

- "Dancehall Style" - Wired Music 2013
- "S.O.M.H." - Fxxk Tomorrow 2015
- "Thousand Ways" (feat. Nick London) - Fxxk Tomorrow 2015

Remixes:

- Metallica - Seek & Destroy (Paranormal Attack - Bombtrack remix)
- Skazi and Ami - Never Again (Paranormal Attack Rmx) - The Gathering Dvd - Vision Quest 2008
- Sesto Sento - Louder (Paranormal Attack Rmx) - Planet Ben Records 2012
- Karetus - Battle Royale (Paranormal Attack Rmx) - Global Army Music 2014

Compilation tracks and collaborations:

- "Bionik Pulse" - Awakening Soul - Crystal Matrix Records 2003
- "What Have You Done" (Rmx) - Digital Eyes - Third Eye Records India 2003
- "Viranchi the Creator" - Al Part 2 - Shiva Space Japan 2004
- "Mastula" ( vs Xp-Voodoo & Paul Taylor ) - Hi-Tech Pleasures - Crystal Matrix Records 2004
- "Yakuza" - Zoo 3 - Chemical Crew Records 2004
- "The Bitts" ( vs Skazi ) - Zoo 3 - Chemical Crew Records 2004
- "What Have You Done?" - Sirius - Sirius Records 2004
- "The Chemical Mafia" - Chemical Crew Records 2004
- "Go On" - Transparent Image - Sirius Records 2005
- "Babbas Fritos" ( vs 40% ) - Transparent Image - Sirius Records 2005
- "Different Song" - Raveolution - Chemical Crew Records 2005
- "Psycrepes" ( vs Exaile ) - Chemical Playground - Chemical Crew Records 2006
- "Fucking My Brain" ( vs Skazi ) - Skazi Album "Total Anarchy" - Chemical Crew Records 2006
- "Brazil" - Turbulence - Chemical Crew Records 2006
- "Everything But The Beats" - Xxxperience 10 Years - LK2 Music 2007
- "Vão Fazer De Novo" ( with Charlie Brown Jr ) - Ritmo, Ritual e Responsa - EMI Brazil 2007
- "Going Down" - Psychedelic High 2 - Chemical Crew Records 2007
- "Tell Me Why" ( vs Mush ) - Mush-A-Holic - Wired Music 2007
- "Come Along" - Be Your Self - Wired Music 2011
- "Get Away" ( vs Cosmonet ) - Out of the Blue - FinePlay Records 2014
