= Marcelo Nova =

Brazilian singer

Marcelo Nova is a Brazilian singer born in the state of Bahia.

He began his career in the group Camisa de Vênus in the 1980s and had recorded several hit songs such as "Bete Morreu" (Betty Died), "Eu Não Matei Joana D'Arc" (I Did Not Kill Joana D'Arc), and "Silvia". At a young age he was a fan of Raul Seixas, and towards the end of Seixas' life, they both worked together on songs, having released the 1989 collaboration A Panela do Diabo (The Devil 's Saucepan), the final album recorded by Seixas.

He also worked with Eric Burdon.
