= Thiago Castanho =

Brazilian guitarist (born 1975)

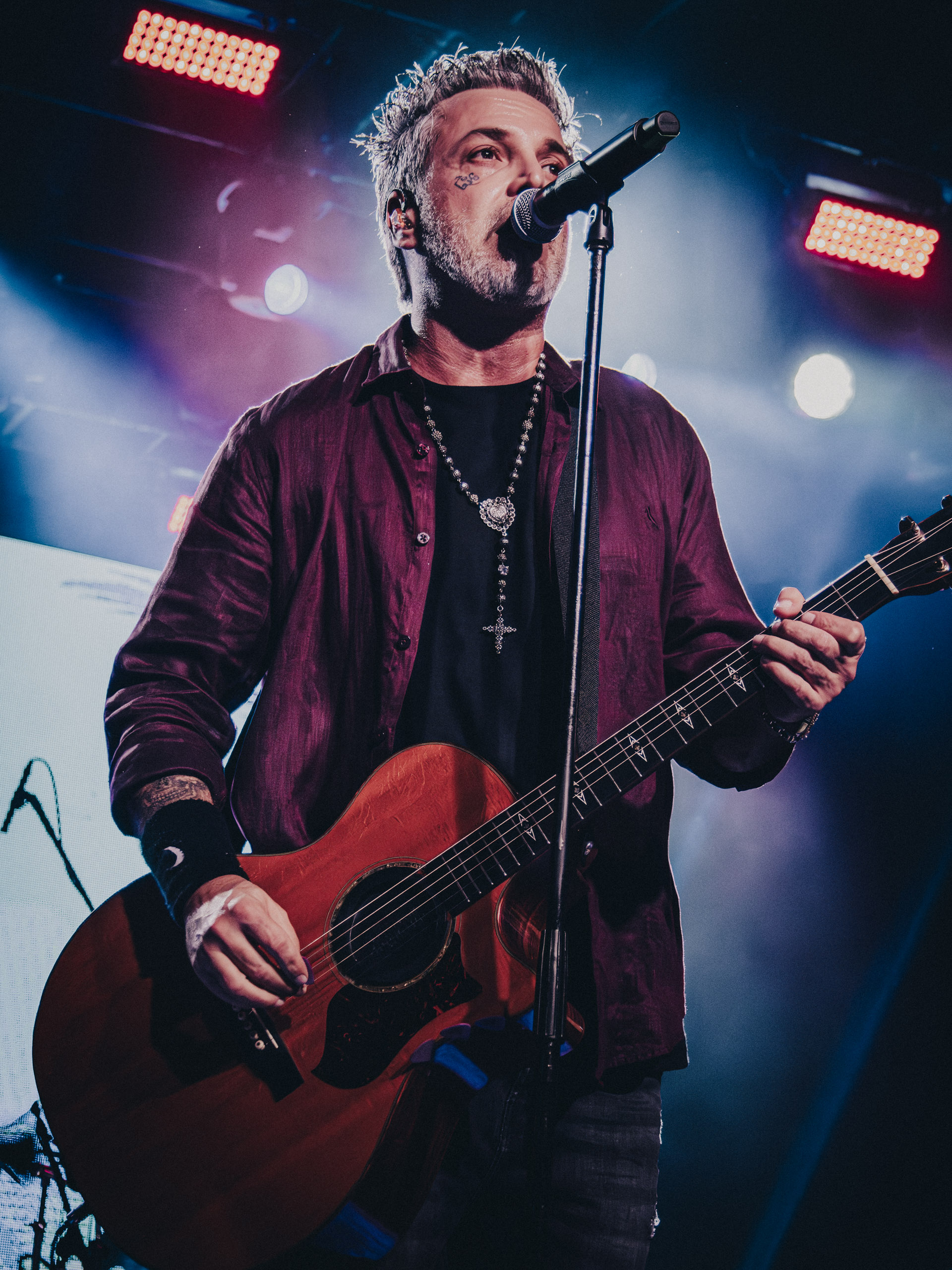
- Castanho performing in São Paulo, 2026

Background information
- Born: Thiago Raphael Castanho; February 8, 1975 (age 51); Santos, São Paulo, Brazil
- Genres: Alternative rock, pop rock, rap rock, reggae rock
- Occupations: Guitarist, composer, record producer, painter, sculptor
- Instrument: Electric guitar
- Years active: 1988–present

Thiago Raphael Castanho (born February 8, 1975) is a Brazilian guitarist, record producer, painter and sculptor, best known for being a founding member of alternative rock bands Charlie Brown Jr., Aliados, A Banca and O Legado, and for his subsequent work with Ira! and Capital Inicial.

== Biography ==
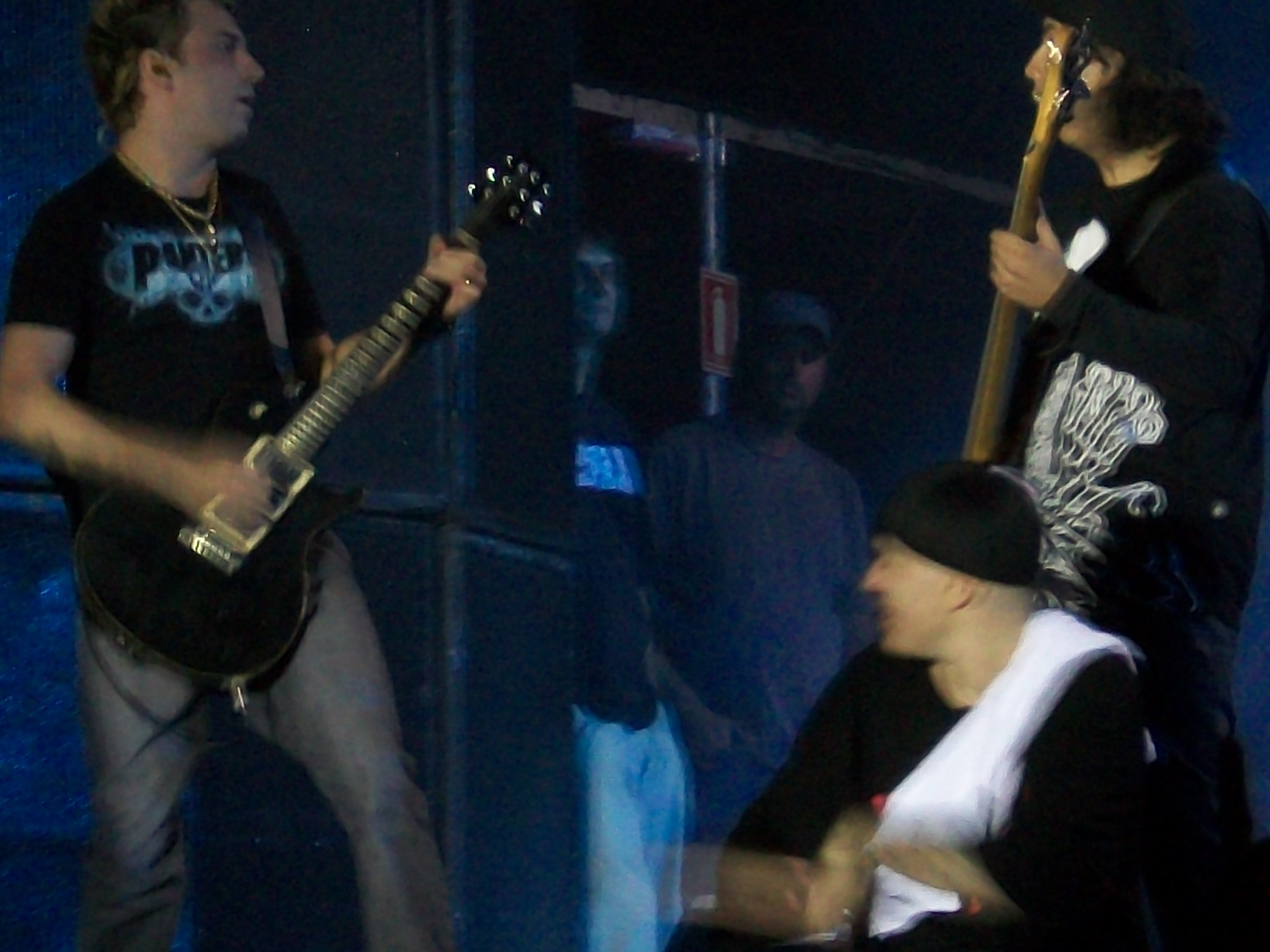
From left to right: Castanho, Chorão and Heitor Gomes at a Charlie Brown Jr. show in 2011

Thiago Raphael Castanho was born in Santos, São Paulo on February 8, 1975, and would learn how to play the guitar with 13 years old, encouraged by a sister. Around 1988 he began performing in his first musical groups, meeting his future Charlie Brown Jr. bandmate Pinguim Ruas through one of them. In 1992 he was invited by Chorão to join his project What's Up, which would later evolve to become Charlie Brown Jr.; Castanho took part on the recording of the band's first three albums, with the final one, Nadando com os Tubarões (2000), awarding them their first nomination to a Latin Grammy Award for Best Portuguese Language Rock or Alternative Album. However, Castanho was growing tired of Charlie Brown Jr.'s extensive touring schedule, and left them one year after the album's release.

Following his departure from Charlie Brown Jr., Castanho formed the band Aliados 13 (later renamed to simply Aliados), with whom he recorded two albums: the self-titled Aliados 13 (2002) A Dose Certa (2004); he also founded his own recording studio, Digital Grooves, in Santos, and was invited to take part in band Ira!'s Acústico MTV live album as a guest musician. Following a major re-shuffle on Charlie Brown Jr.'s line-up in 2005, Castanho accepted an invitation to return to the band; during his second tenure with them, he co-produced the album Ritmo, Ritual e Responsa alongside Chorão, and cameod as himself in the 2007 film O Magnata, written and co-produced by Chorão. He remained with the band until 2013, when it ended following Chorão's death due to a cocaine overdose.

Soon afterwards, he and remaining Charlie Brown Jr. members Champignon, Marcão and Bruno Graveto teamed up with Lena Papini to form A Banca, described as a "tribute act/spiritual successor" to Charlie Brown Jr.; they released a single, "O Novo Passo", in August, before splitting up as well due to the suicide of Champignon one month later.

In 2014 he teamed up with former NX Zero vocalist Yuri Nishida to form O Legado; they split up one year later due to Nishida's other commitments. Around the same time Castanho was invited by Capital Inicial's vocalist Dinho Ouro Preto to be a guest musician on their Acústico NYC DVD, recorded at a performance in New York City.

In late 2019 he was a guest musician on the song "Nosso Lugar", by funk singer MC Kevin.

Outside of his musical career, Castanho is also a painter and a sculptor; in 2013 he organized his first exhibition of sculptures in acrylic in São Paulo.

=== Controversies ===
On July 21, 2013, while travelling to Manaus for a performance with A Banca, an elderly woman accused Castanho of sexual harassment inside the airplane. After a discussion, the musician headed to the Federal Police to give his statement; his bandmates later confirmed that he wasn't arrested.

In 2019 he was a vehement critic of Charlie Brown Jr.'s return with guest vocalists, stating that "the band can't exist without Chorão". However, when the band reunited once again in 2021 for a tour celebrating Chorão's 50th birthday, Castanho agreed to return as guitarist. He parted ways alongside bandmate Marcão on October 25, citing creative divergences with Chorão's son Alexandre, the tour's organizer.

== Discography ==
=== Charlie Brown Jr. ===
- (1997) Transpiração Contínua Prolongada
- (1999) Preço Curto... Prazo Longo
- (2000) Nadando com os Tubarões
- (2005) Imunidade Musical
- (2007) Ritmo, Ritual e Responsa
- (2009) Camisa 10 Joga Bola Até na Chuva
- (2012) Música Popular Caiçara
- (2013) La Familia 013
- (2021) Chegou Quem Faltava

=== Aliados ===
- (2002) Aliados 13
- (2004) A Dose Certa
