= MV Bill =

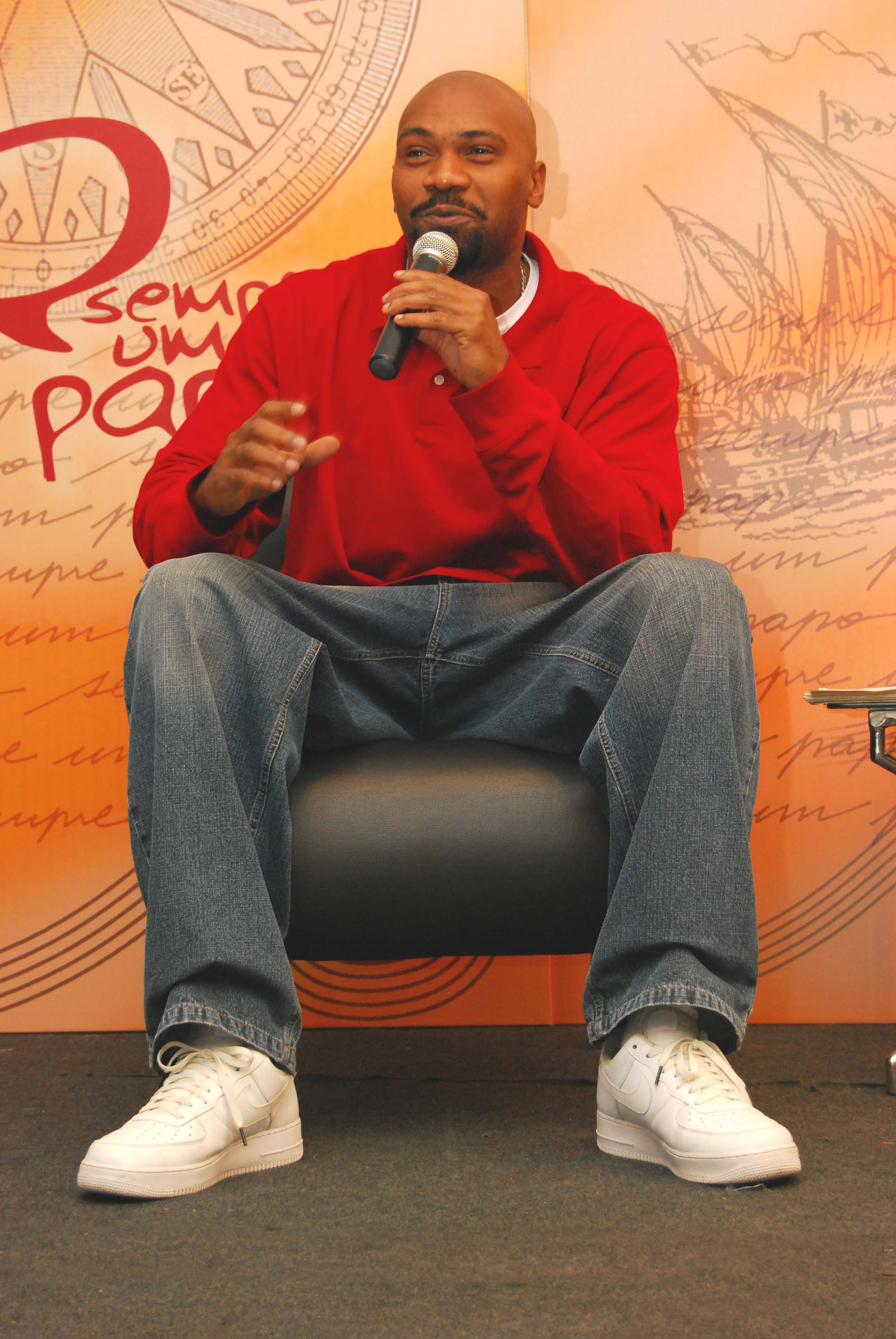

Background information
- Born: Alexandre Pereira Barbosa; January 3, 1974 (age 52); Rio de Janeiro, Brazil
- Origin: Brazil
- Genres: Brazilian hip hop, Political hip hop
- Occupations: Rapper, singer, author, actor, songwriter
- Years active: 1998 – present
- Label: Universal Music Brazil
- Website: mvbill.com.br

Alexandre Pereira Barbosa (born January 3, 1974), known professionally as MV Bill, is a Brazilian rapper, singer, actor, songwriter and co-author of the best-selling book Falcão - Meninos do Tráfico. The initials "MV" stand for "Mensageiro da Verdade", Portuguese for "Messenger of Truth", and the nickname Bill came from a favorite childhood toy.

MV Bill is one of the leading and most controversial rappers of Brazilian hip hop in Rio de Janeiro. Rio remains as the center of developing Brazilian politics. MV Bill is an advocate for getting the Brazilian youth out of the drug trade and into some more uplifting activities. He founded a network of NGOs located in Rio including CUFA, which strive to teach hip-hop skills, graffiti, and break dancing to children, alongside educational classes such as computer training. Many of his songs contain lyrics discussing the Brazilian youth lost to the trades and confrontations in Rio.

MV Bill has also funneled his passion for social justice into a book, Cabeça de Porco, that he co-authored with Celso Athayde and Luis Eduardo Soares, one of Brazil's foremost social anthropologists. The book, published in 2005, revolves around the issue of social injustice and violence in Brazil and discusses what must be done to solve the problem.

MV Bill appears in an episode of "Black in Latin America". He has been credited with releasing one of the first Brazilian grime songs, "Cidadão Comum Refém", in 2002 after being influenced by a Dizzee Rascal CD.

== Early life ==
Alex Pereira Barbosa was born in the Cidade de Deus neighborhood of Rio de Janeiro on January 3, 1974. His father, Mano Juca Barbosa was a firefighter while his mother Dona Cristina was a housewife.

His younger sister, Kamilla "Kmila CDD" Barbosa is a well-known rapper who is considered one of the biggest names in the female rap scene in Brazil.

== Discography ==
- 1998: Traficando Informação
- 2002: Declaração de Guerra
- 2006: Falcão, O Bagulho É Doido
- 2010: Causa E Efeito

=== Soundtracks ===
- 2011: Beat the World

== Selected filmography ==
Year	Title	Role	Notes
2010	Malhação	Antônio	
2013	Odeio o Dia dos Namorados	Tonhão	
2018	Me Chama de Bruna	Cícero	
2024	Volta por Cima	Lindomar de Souza	
