= Chorão =

Brazilian singer-songwriter (1970–2013)

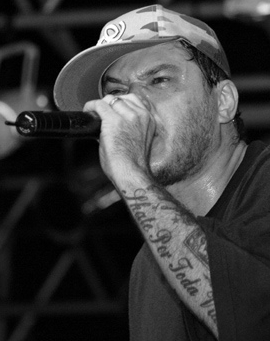
- Chorão in 2008
- Born: Alexandre Magno Abrão; April 9, 1970; São Paulo, Brazil
- Died: March 6, 2013 (aged 42); São Paulo, Brazil
- Resting place: Ecumenical Necropolis Memorial Cemetery, Santos, São Paulo, Brazil
- Occupations: Singer-songwriter; skateboarder; filmmaker; screenwriter; businessman; rapper
- Years active: 1988–2013
- Spouses: Thaís Lima (divorced); Graziela Gonçalves (m. 2003; sep. 2011)
- Children: 1
- Relatives: Sonia Abrão (cousin)
- Musical career
- Genres: Rap rock, rock
- Instruments: Vocals, guitar

Alexandre Magno Abrão (April 9, 1970 – March 6, 2013), known professionally as Chorão, was a Brazilian singer-songwriter, skateboarder, filmmaker, screenwriter and businessman. Best known for being a founding member and the vocalist/main lyricist of the influential rock band Charlie Brown Jr., Folha de S.Paulo critic André Barcinski considered him "the nearest thing to a punk hero Brazilian mainstream music ever had", and Eduardo Tristão Girão of Portal Uai called him "the bad boy of Brazilian rock" and "the spokesman of the youth of the 1990s". Having been born and raised for most of his childhood in São Paulo, Chorão was the only Charlie Brown Jr. member not to be a Santos native, and its only founding member to remain consistently in all of the group's line-ups.

== Biography ==
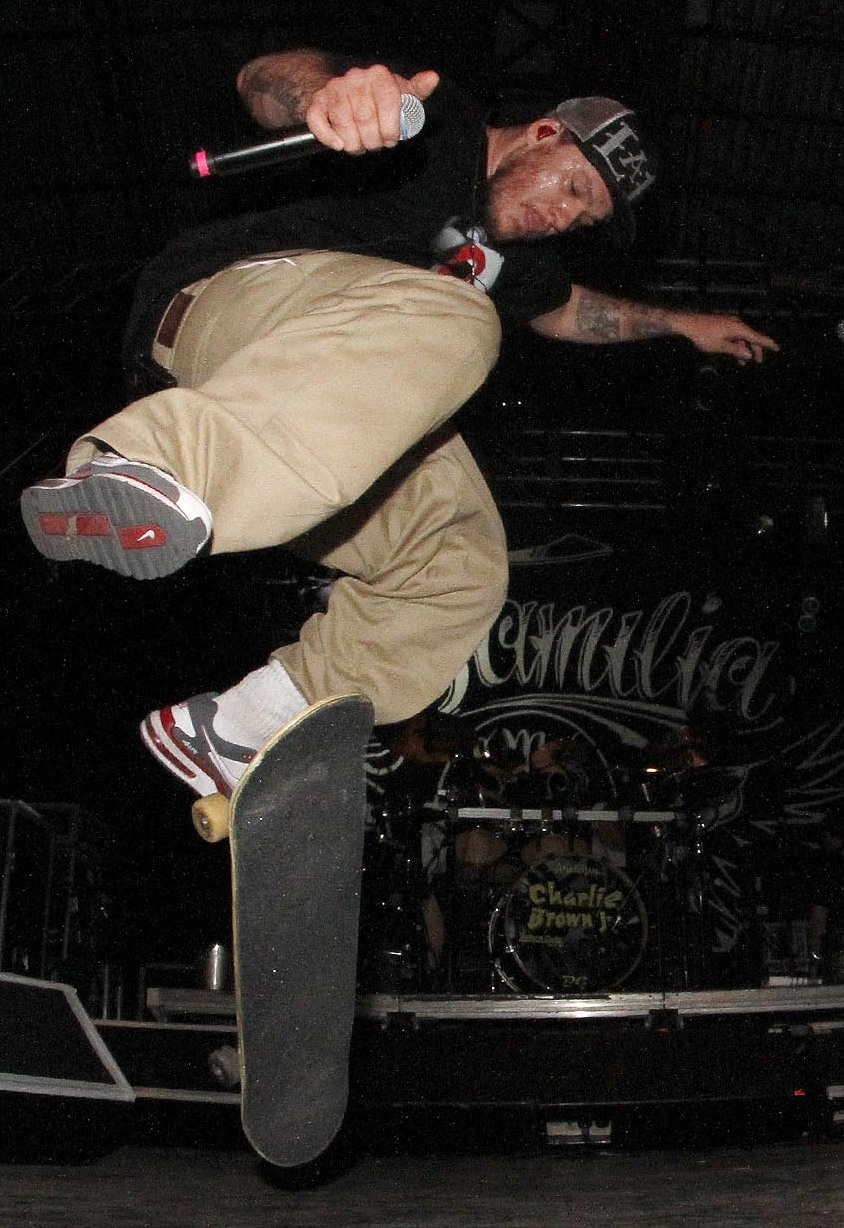
Chorão skating in 2012

Alexandre Magno Abrão was born in the district of Tremembé in the Northeast Zone of São Paulo on April 9, 1970. He also had a brother, Ricardo, and a sister, Tânia, who died of a stroke in 2015 aged 55. He was the cousin of journalist and television presenter Sonia Abrão. He experienced an unhappy childhood; his parents, Nilda and Geraldo Abrão, divorced when he was 11 years old, and he dropped out of school in the seventh grade as he couldn't afford the tuition fees and due to his unruly behavior. Prior to beginning his musical career he worked as a delivery boy for his mother, a cook, until she suffered the first in a series of debilitating strokes in 1984, and briefly as a realtor alongside his father, who would die of cancer in 2001. Many times while trying to live on his own he was frequently evicted and had his possessions confiscated due to the non-payment of rent (an experience which would later inspire the Charlie Brown Jr. song "Confisco"). Eventually taking skateboarding as a pastime, he received the nickname "Chorão" (roughly translated as "cry-baby") from his friends due to his emotionality. Around this time he would also develop his long-time cocaine addiction, which would plague him for the rest of his life.

In 1987 his family moved to the coastal town of Santos, where he would form his first musical project, the hardcore punk/crossover thrash band What's Up, circa 1988; he was invited to be its vocalist after being spotted by a member of the audience at a bar while covering a Suicidal Tendencies song. What's Up underwent its first line-up change in 1990, when they were joined by then-12-year-old bassist Champignon, and then in 1992 when Marcão, Thiago Castanho and Renato Pelado were approached. However, Chorão thought the band was taking too long to make a breakthrough and decided to revamp it under a new name; he eventually settled on "Charlie Brown Jr.", explaining that "Charlie Brown" came to him after recalling a time when he crashed with his car into a coconut stand with a drawing of the eponymous character of Charles M. Schulz's comic strip Peanuts on it, and the "Jr." alluding to the fact that he considered his band to be "the children of rock", following the lead of other famous groups at the time such as Raimundos, Nação Zumbi, Planet Hemp and O Rappa. During its 21-year lifespan, Charlie Brown Jr. released ten studio albums and was nominated for seven Latin Grammy Awards, winning two; their success, though, was frequently overshadowed by controversies and clashes regarding Chorão and his bandmates, who often described him as a "domineering" person – constant creative divergences would culminate in the band's entire line-up departing following the release of their 2004 album Tamo Aí na Atividade. In 2007 he threatened to sue Marcão and Champignon after they performed in the United States under the "Charlie Brown Jr." name, as he was the one who held the rights of it. Both would return to the band in 2011, but Pelado and Chorão never made amends. In 2012, during a performance at Apucarana, Paraná, Chorão and Champignon got into an altercation and the latter was expelled from the band on stage. The following day, though, they reconciled.

Known for his brash, boorish personality, Chorão also got into many feuds with other musicians and brawls; in 2003 he insulted CPM 22 vocalist Badauí due to a "tongue-in-cheek" statement regarding him Badauí gave to a magazine. (In a later interview given after Chorão's death, the band would state the feud had ended after they talked to him privately.) The same year, he slapped a 17-year-old teenager in the face at a supermarket, claiming he overheard him "badmouthing" Charlie Brown Jr. In 2005 he got involved in a car crash which ended in four people getting wounded. In 2008 he was expelled from a Gol flight en route to Manaus, after refusing to switch off an electronic device and insulting those aboard the airplane. His most well-publicized feud, though, was with Los Hermanos vocalist Marcelo Camelo; in 2002 Chorão was invited to be a spokesman for a series of ads by Coca-Cola, leading many to criticize him (Camelo included) as a "sell-out". On July 4, 2004, he and Camelo met at an airport in Fortaleza; after an altercation, Chorão punched him in the face and broke his nose. He would later apologize, but Los Hermanos still launched two lawsuits against him. As of 2015, two years after Chorão's death and eleven after the incident, both were still pending.

Outside music, Chorão wrote and co-produced the 2007 film O Magnata, which was directed by long-time collaborator Johnny Araújo and starred Paulo Vilhena, Milhem Cortaz, Rosanne Mulholland, Maria Luísa Mendonça, Chico Díaz, Priscila Sol, Marcos Mion and Marcelo Nova. Charlie Brown Jr.'s eighth album, Ritmo, Ritual e Responsa, was billed as the first part of its soundtrack; the band also cameos as itself on the film. Despite being a moderate box office success, O Magnata received reviews ranging from mixed to negative. By the time of his death Chorão was working on the script of a second film, entitled O Cobrador; it was originally announced for a 2016 release, with Cortaz and Vilhena returning for new roles, but since then no further announcements were given.

In 2005 Chorão inaugurated his own indoor skatepark and musical venue in Santos, Chorão Skate Park; Charlie Brown Jr.'s DVD Skate Vibration was recorded at its opening party. However, by the time of his death, it began to decline due to financial difficulties and the non-payment of debts. Despite a series of protests and petitions organized by fans, acquaintances and relatives of Chorão, former Charlie Brown Jr. members and Detonautas Roque Clube vocalist Tico Santa Cruz, it eventually closed down to the public in late 2013 and was demolished in early 2014.

In 2009 he launched his own clothing brand for skateboarders, DO.CE.

He also illustrated the cover art of Charlie Brown Jr.'s 1999 single "Zóio de Lula".

=== Death, tributes and legacy ===
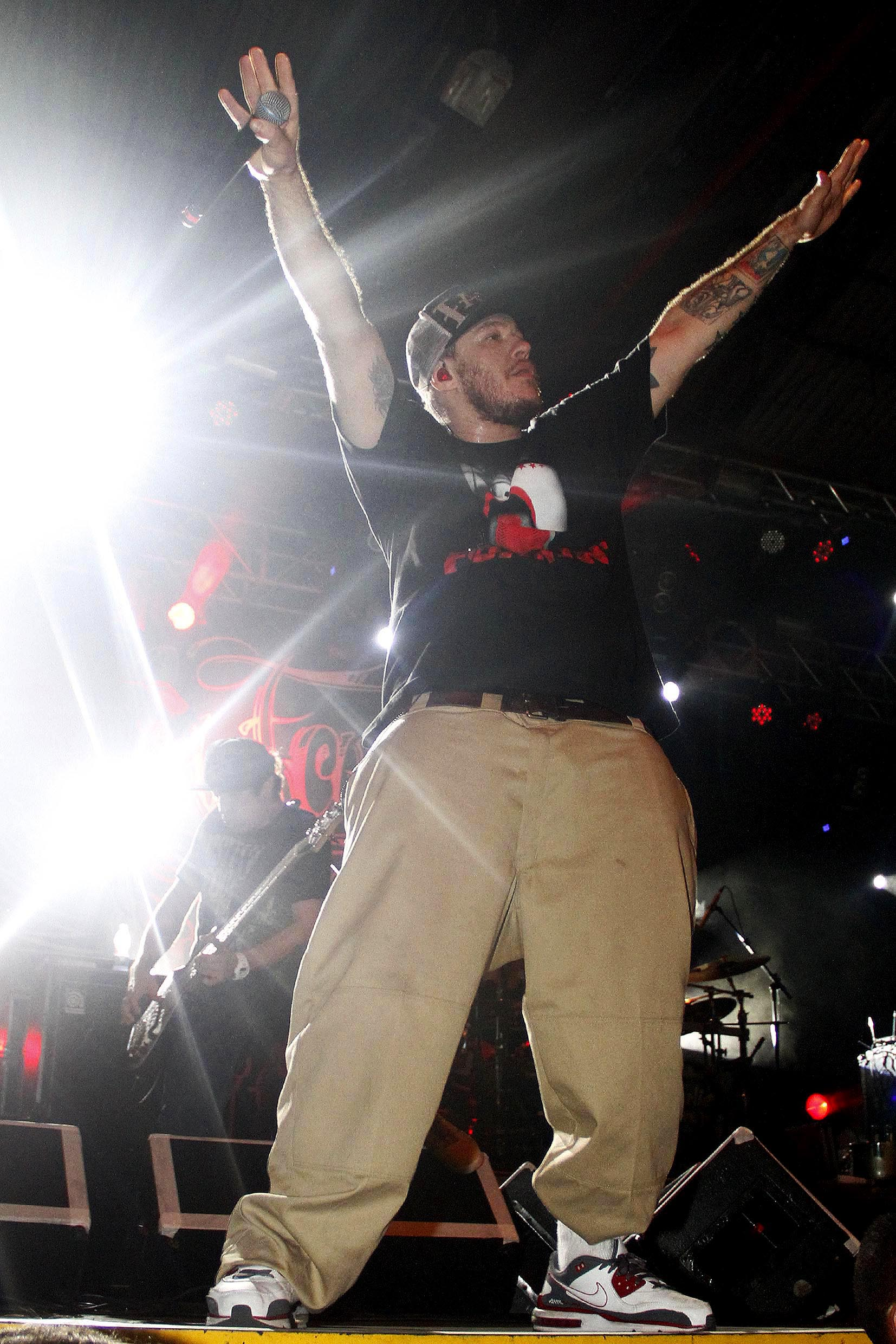
Chorão and Champignon (in the background) performing in 2012

By his final years Chorão's drug abuse issues began to take their toll on his life and health. His long-time companion Graziela Gonçalves had separated from him in 2011, and his son Alexandre and previous wife Thaís Lima unsuccessfully tried to admit him to a rehabilitation clinic. Even though it was denied by Alexandre, Chorão began to sink into a major depression following the separation. On March 6, 2013, his driver found him dead at his apartment in the bairro of Pinheiros in São Paulo; the police, who initially dismissed the possibility of homicide, stated that the apartment was "heavily damaged" and in "state of disarray". His cause of death was later ruled a cocaine overdose, but investigators could not determine if the overdose was intentional or accidental.

His wake was held at the Arena Santos and he was buried at the Cemitério Memorial Necrópole Ecumênica, where six months later his former bandmate Champignon would also be buried following his suicide. By a somewhat strange coincidence, Chorão died on the 14th anniversary of one of Charlie Brown Jr.'s most well-regarded releases, Preço Curto... Prazo Longo.

Following his death, then-mayor of Santos Paulo Alexandre Barbosa announced a three-day period of mourning, and fans made tributes to him in skateparks all around the city. American band Guns N' Roses would pay their respects to Chorão by posting on their official Facebook page a video of their song "Don't Cry", dedicating it to him, and sertanejo universitário singer Lucas Lucco wrote a song in his honor entitled "Ninguém Podia Prever". A life-long fan of Santos FC, he also received tributes by the team's former players Robinho, Walter Montillo and Elano. Rap duo Bonde da Stronda, who befriended Chorão later in life, covered "Lutar pelo que É Meu" as a homage to him at a performance in Campo Grande, Mato Grosso do Sul on March 9, 2013. Television presenter Luciano Huck, Ira! vocalist Nasi, long-time friends and frequent Charlie Brown Jr. collaborators Negra Li and Rodolfo Abrantes, former actor Alexandre Frota, politician Marta Suplicy and footballer Neymar, among others, also made statements on his death and gave their condolences.

Then-Governor of São Paulo Geraldo Alckmin stated he would name a skatepark in the North Zone of the city of São Paulo after Chorão.

International newspapers and websites such as HuffPost, The Washington Post, The San Diego Union-Tribune, Billboard and Latin Times also commented on Chorão's death, the latter noticeably mistranslating his stage name as "Big Crying".

On March 29, 2015, a biographical musical about Chorão entitled Dias de Luta, Dias de Glória premiered, written by Well Rianc and directed by siblings Bruno and Luiz Sorrentino. Rapper DZ6 starred as Chorão. Despite good critical reception, Chorão's brother Ricardo lambasted it as being "disrespectful" and "inaccurate".

A street in the city of Franco da Rocha, São Paulo was named after him in 2017.

Chorão was portrayed by José Loreto in the 2026 biographical film Chorão – Só os Loucos Sabem.

=== Documentary ===
Shortly after Chorão's death, film producers Felipe Elias, Victor Santini Stockler and Roberta Franco launched a crowdfunding campaign on website Catarse to finance a documentary about his story with Charlie Brown Jr. entitled Marginal Alado; it reached R$41,513.00, surpassing its original intended goal of R$35,000.00. Directed by Felipe Novaes, the film premiered across festivals in Brazil in 2019, receiving a wide release on movie theaters and streaming services on April 8, 2021.

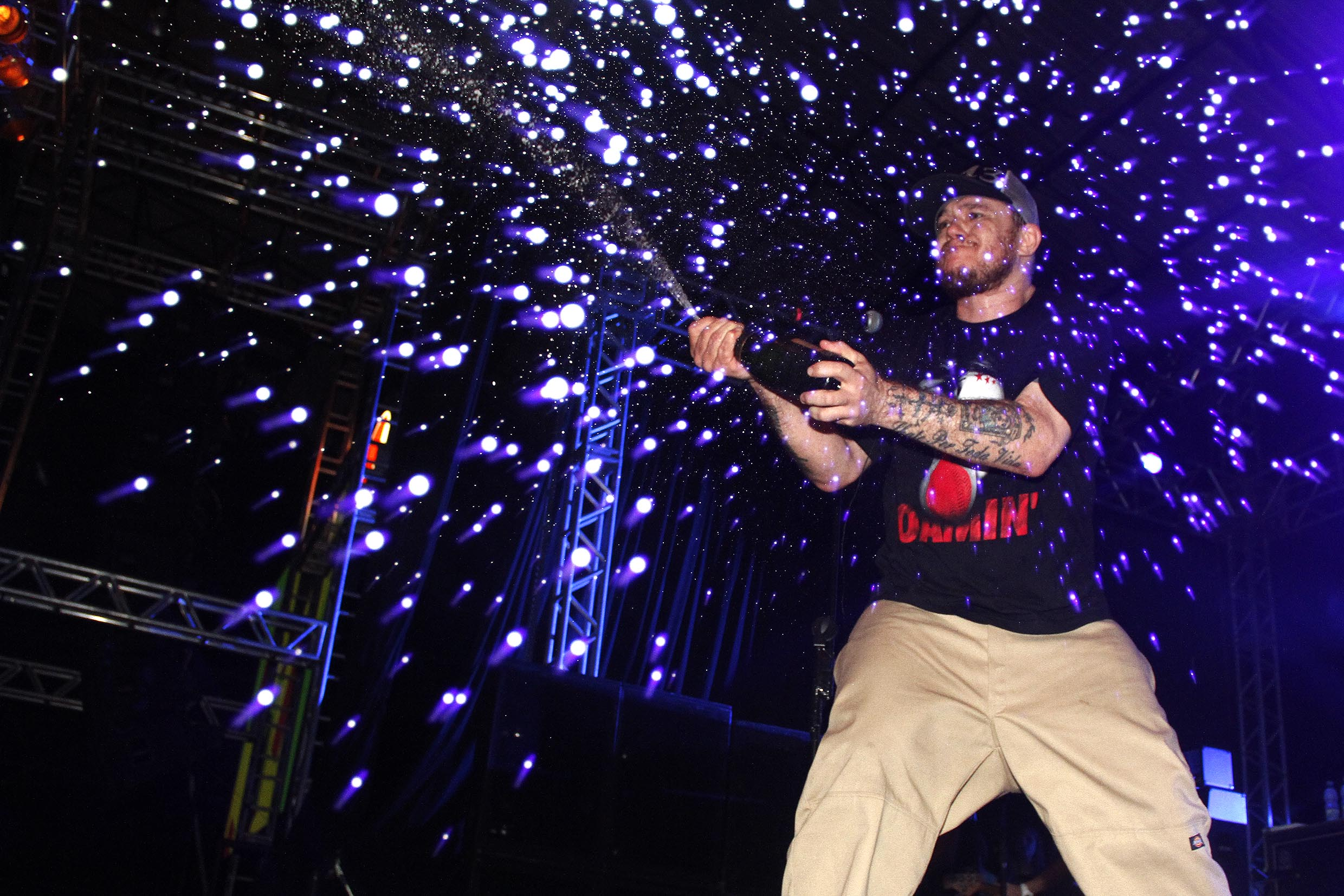
Chorão in 2012

== Personal life ==
Chorão met his future wife, fashion designer Graziela Gonçalves, in 1994; they married in 2003. Affectionately nicknamed "Grazon" by him, Chorão claimed she was "his muse" and dedicated many of Charlie Brown Jr.'s songs to her, the most notable being "Proibida pra Mim (Grazon)" (off Transpiração Contínua Prolongada) and "Céu Azul" (off Música Popular Caiçara), written shortly after their separation in 2011. From a previous, short-lived marriage with Thaís Lima, which allegedly ended after he found out she was cheating on him, he had a son also named Alexandre (born 1990). In 2017 Alexandre published the book Eu Estava Lá Também, a compilation of photographs and memoirs from his father dating from 2005–2012; in 2020 he would reveal that, shortly after his death, he had ordered a diamond made of a lock of his father's hair.

In 2018 Graziela published through Companhia das Letras her memoir, Se Não Eu, Quem Vai Fazer Você Feliz?, in which she details her love life with Chorão.

== Discography ==
For a more comprehensive list, see Charlie Brown Jr. discography

- (1997) Transpiração Contínua Prolongada
- (1999) Preço Curto... Prazo Longo
- (2000) Nadando com os Tubarões
- (2001) Abalando a Sua Fábrica
- (2002) Bocas Ordinárias
- (2003) Acústico MTV: Charlie Brown Jr.
- (2004) Tamo Aí na Atividade
- (2005) Imunidade Musical
- (2007) Ritmo, Ritual e Responsa
- (2009) Camisa 10 Joga Bola Até na Chuva
- (2012) Música Popular Caiçara
- (2013) La Familia 013
- (2021) Chegou Quem Faltava
