= Acústico MTV: O Rappa =

Acústico MTV

Live album by O Rappa
- Released: 2005
- Recorded: May 2005
- Genre: Rock, reggae
- Length: 73:10
- Label: Warner Music
- Producer: Carlos Eduardo Miranda

O Rappa chronology
| O Silêncio Q Precede O Esporro (2003) | Acústico MTV (2005) | 7 Vezes (2008) |

Acústico MTV (English: MTV Unplugged) is the sixth album by Brazilian band O Rappa and their second live album. It was produced by Carlos Eduardo Miranda. It was released in 2005 through Warner Music. It was recorded in May 2005 in São Paulo, and the crowd was made up of only friends of the band and members of the official fan club.

== Track listing ==
=== CD ===
1. "Na Frente Do Reto" – 5:29
2. "Mar De Gente" – 4:54
3. "Brinxton, Bronx Ou Baixada" – 5:53
4. "Homem Amarelo" – 6:33
5. "Lado B Lado A" – 5:15
6. "Reza Vela" – 6:29
7. "Se Não Avisar O Bicho Pega" – 4:39
8. "Rodo Cotidiano" – 6:17
9. "Não Perca As Crianças De Vista" – 5:22
10. "Pescador De Ilusões" – 5:06
11. "O Salto" – 5:42
12. "Papo De Surdo E Mudo" – 5:00
13. "Eu Quero Ver Gol" – 6:34

==== Notes ====
- Track 3: O Rappa
- Tracks 10 and 13: Rappa Mundi
- Tracks 4, 5 and 7: Lado B Lado A
- Tracks 2, 6, 8, 11 and 12: O Silêncio Q Precede O Esporro

=== DVD ===
1. "Na Frente Do Reto" – 5:20
2. "Mar De Gente" – 4:49
3. "Bitterusso Champagne" – 6:08
4. "Brinxton, Bronx Ou Baixada" – 5:20
5. "Homem Amarelo" – 7:03
6. "Mitologia Gerimum" – 3:54
7. "Lado B Lado A" – 5:16
8. "O Novo Já Nasce Velho" – 5:41
9. "Reza Vela" – 6:17
10. "Se Não Avisar O Bicho Pega" – 4:08
11. "O Que Sobrou Do Céu" – 4:49
12. "Rodo Cotidiano" – 6:07
13. "Não Perca As Crianças De Vista" – 5:24
14. "Pescador De Ilusões" – 5:06
15. "O Salto" – 5:29
16. "Cristo E Oxalá" – 7:53
17. "Papo De Surdo E Mudo" – 5:04
18. "Me Deixa" – 4:32
19. "Eu Quero Ver Gol" – 5:53

==== Notes ====
- Tracks 4 and 6: O Rappa
- Tracks 14 and 19: Rappa Mundi
- Tracks 5, 7, 10, 11, 16 and 18: Lado B Lado A
- Tracks 2, 3, 8, 9, 12, 15 and 17: O Silêncio Q Precede O Esporro

== Personnel ==
=== O Rappa ===
- Marcelo Falcão - voice, acoustic guitar and guitarpsichord
- Xandão - acoustic guitar, guitarpsichord, country guitar, mandolin, ukulele and akkordolia
- Lauro Farias - acoustic guitar bass and miniature bass guitar
- Marcelo Lobato - drums, electric organ, steelpan, bells, marimba, tubular bells and vibraphone

=== Additional musicians ===
- Marcos Lobato - cabinet piano, electric piano, electric organ, harmonium and vibraphone
- Dj Negralha - gramodisk, gramophone and percussion
- Pedro Leão - acoustic guitar, guitarpsichord and mandolin
- Bernardo Aguiar and Juninho - percussion
- Alessandra Rodrigues, Play Falcão and Vinícius Falcão - backing vocals

=== Special appearances ===
- Siba - rabeca (5, 6, 16)
- Maria Rita - vocals (11, 12)

== See also ==
Official Site
