= Sample =

Sample or samples may refer to:

- Sample (graphics), an intersection of a color channel and a pixel
- Sample (material), a specimen or small quantity of something
- Sample (signal), a digital discrete sample of a continuous analog signal
- Sample (statistics), a subset of a population – complete data set

== People ==
- Sample (surname)
- Samples (surname)

== Places ==
- Sample, Kentucky, unincorporated community, United States
- Sampleville, Ohio, unincorporated community, United States
- Hugh W. and Sarah Sample House, listed on the National Register of Historic Places in Iowa, United States

== Music ==
- Sampling (music), to reuse a portion of a sound recording in another recording, or the portion reused
- "Sample" (Sakanaction song)
- "Sample", a song by No-Man from Flowermix
- The Samples, a band from Boulder, Colorado

== Other uses ==
- USS Sample (FF-1048), a frigate in the U.S. Navy
- The Sample, a defunct department store in Buffalo, New York, U.S.
- SAMPLE history, a mnemonic acronym for questions that medical first responders should ask
- Product sample, a sample of a consumer product that is given to the consumer so that they may try a product before committing to a purchase
- Standard cross-cultural sample, a sample of 186 cultures, used by scholars engaged in cross-cultural studies

== See also ==
- Sampler (disambiguation)
- Sampling (disambiguation)
