= Instinto Coletivo ao Vivo =

Instinto Coletivo Ao Vivo

Live album by O Rappa
- Released: 2001
- Genre: Alternative rock, reggae
- Length: 106:46
- Label: Warner Music
- Producer: Chico Neves; O Rappa; Sepultura (on "Ninguém Regula A América" only)

O Rappa chronology
Lado B Lado A (1999)	Instinto Coletivo Ao Vivo (2001)	O Silêncio Q Precede O Esporro (2003)

Professional ratings
Review scores
Source	Rating
Clique Music	3/5 stars

Instinto Coletivo Ao Vivo (English: Collective Instinct Live) is the fourth album by Brazilian band O Rappa and their first Live album. It was produced by Tom Capone and O Rappa except "Ninguém Regula A América" which features and is also produced by Sepultura and "Instinto Coletivo" which features and is also mixed by Asian Dub Foundation. It is distributed through Warner Music.

== Track listing ==
=== Disc 1 ===
1. "Intro" - 1:28
2. "Tumulto" (from Rappa Mundi) - 3:42
3. "Se Não Avisar O Bicho Pega" (from Lado B Lado A) - 4:17
4. "Miséria S.A." – (from Rappa Mundi) 3:05
5. "Todo Camburão Tem Um Pouco De Navio Negreiro" (from O Rappa) – 11:34
6. "O Homem Amarelo" (from Lado B Lado A) - 4:40
7. "Minha Alma (A Paz Que Eu Não Quero)" (from Lado B Lado A) - 5:39
8. "Cristo E Oxalá" (from Lado B Lado A) - 5:15
9. "Hey Joe" (from Rappa Mundi) - 5:32
10. "Nó de Fumaça" (from Lado B Lado A) - 3:48
11. "Homem Bomba" (from Rappa Mundi) - 8:16
12. "Me Deixa" (from Lado B Lado A) - 3:55
13. "Vapor Barato" (from Rappa Mundi) - 7:05

=== Disc 2 ===
1. "Lado B Lado A" (from Lado B Lado A) - 6:15
2. "A Feira" (from Rappa Mundi) - 3:50
3. "Ilê Ayê" (from Rappa Mundi) - 4:16
4. "Ninguém Regula A América" – 4:18
5. "Milagre" – 5:17
6. "Instinto Coletivo" - 5:06
7. "Fica Doido Varrido" - 4:37
8. "R.A.M." (from O Rappa) - 4:51

== Personnel ==
=== O Rappa ===
- Marcelo Falcão - lead vocals, rhythm guitar
- Xandão - acoustic (19), lead guitar (1–18, 20, 21), backing vocals
- Lauro Farias - bass, backing vocals
- Marcelo Lobato - keyboards, Fender Rhodes, theremin, backing vocals; air FX (17), drums (18)
- Marcelo Yuka - drums (1–16, 19–21); electronic drum (17); vocals (19)

=== Additional musicians ===
- Bidinho and Paulo Marcio - trumpets (19)
- DJ Negralha - scratches and vocals
- Eduardo Lyra - percussion
- Welington Soares - percussion
- Sepultura - backing band (17)
