= Marcelo Falcão =

Brazilian musician

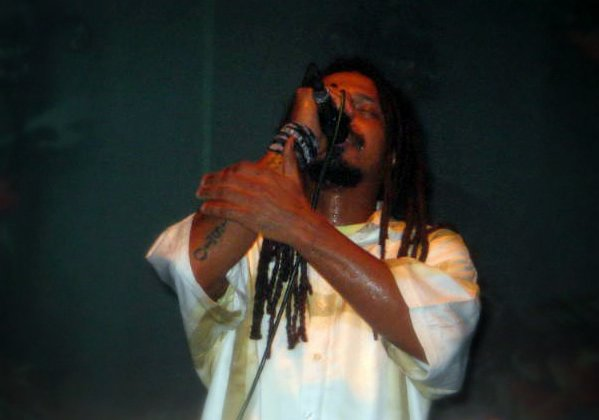
- Falcão in concert with O Rappa in São Paulo, 2005

Background information
- Born: Marcelo Falcão Custódio; May 31, 1973 (age 53)
- Origin: Rio de Janeiro, Rio de Janeiro, Brazil
- Genres: Alternative rock, reggae, rap rock
- Occupations: Singer-songwriter
- Instruments: Vocals, electric guitar, acoustic guitar
- Years active: 1993–present
- Label: Warner Music Group
- Website: marcelofalcaooficial.com.br

Marcelo Falcão Custódio (born May 31, 1973, in Rio de Janeiro) is a Brazilian musician, the lead singer of the group O Rappa.

Falcão was born and grew up in Engenho Novo, Rio de Janeiro.

He sang with Marcelo D2 in his version of "Hey Joe", popularized in the voice and guitar of Jimi Hendrix, and covered by several big names in rock and pop music in general and Seal, Paul Rodgers, Steve Ray Vaughan, Brian May, David Gilmour, commonly performed in group shows like Guitar Legends (Barcelona, 1992).

== Early life ==
Marcelo Falcão was born on May 31, 1973, in the Engenho Novo neighborhood of Rio de Janeiro, where he was raised. He was one of the two sons of Ademir Custódio and Maria Selma Falcão Custódio.

Upon the start of his career, he was part of his rock band O Rappa until its disbanding in 2018. Sometime in 2004 or 2005 or 2006, his voice became matured.

== Discography ==
=== Solo ===
- 2019 – Viver (Mais Leve Que O Ar)

=== with O Rappa ===
Studio albums

- 1994 – O Rappa
- 1996 – Rappa Mundi
- 1999 – Lado B Lado A
- 2003 – O Silêncio Q Precede O Esporro
- 2008 – 7 Vezes
- 2013 – Nunca Tem Fim...

Live albums

- 2001 – Instinto Coletivo Ao Vivo
- 2005 – Acústico MTV
- 2010 – Ao Vivo
- 2016 – Acústico Oficina Francisco Brennand

DVDs

- 2004 – O Silêncio Q Precede O Esporro
- 2005 – Acústico MTV
- 2008 – 7 Vezes (Musical Video Interactive)
- 2010 – Ao Vivo
- 2016 – Acústico Oficina Francisco Brennand
