= Archie Boston Jr. =

American graphic artist (born 1943)

- Born: 1943 (age 82–83); Clewiston, Florida, U.S.
- Occupations: Graphic designer, design educator
- Awards: AIGA Medal (2021)

Archie Boston Jr. (born 1943) is an American graphic artist, and retired professor.

Born to an impoverished family in a small town in southern Florida, Boston received an education in graphic design at Chouinard Art Institute located in Los Angeles. During school and after graduation, he worked in numerous ad agencies based in Los Angeles before forming Boston & Boston Design with his brother Bradford in 1967—one of the first Black-owned agencies in the United States. In 1972, at age 29, he became the president of the Art Director Club of Los Angeles, the second-largest in the nation. He was the first Black president in the organization's 28-year history.

In 1977 Boston received a master's degree from the University of Southern California, and began his long career as an educator at California State University, Long Beach. He helped found the Visual Communications Design program there and served as the department chair. In 2004 he was named Outstanding Professor of the Year.

He has produced several documentary films, including 20 Outstanding Los Angeles Designers and, in 2018 with his brother David, he produced the documentary, Black Pioneers of the Sunshine City about the activist members of the Black community in St. Petersburg, Florida

In 2021, Boston became an American Institute of Graphic Arts medalist.

== Early life and education ==
Born in 1943 in Clewiston, Florida, Boston's father was either a sugar cane sharecropper or a migrant worker tilling the sugarcane fields and later became a truck driver. His mother raised five children, including Archie, and worked as a babysitter. The same year as Archie was born, the impoverished family moved to the "Peppertown" area of St. Petersburg, a black community of around 14,000 residents occupying about 2 square miles. The Boston family may have moved to the Gas Plant area of the community at some point in the 1940s, an area that is currently known as Midtown. Boston graduated from Gibbs High School.

In 1961, Boston followed in the footsteps of his older brother, Bradford, attending Chouinard Art Institute in Los Angeles (which later became California Institute of the Arts). National Defense Student Loans funded his education for the first three years and then a Disney Foundation Scholarship funded his final year of graphic design studies. He was taught by Louis Danziger, Ken Parkhurst, and Marvin Rubin, graduating with honors in 1965. In 1977 he received his master's degree in liberal arts from the University of Southern California.

== Career ==
During his senior year at Chouinard, Boston worked as an intern at the Los Angeles-based advertising agency Carson/Roberts, one of the largest in the West. He went on to work at various studios, including Hixson and Jorgensen Advertising in 1965, and in 1966 he became an art director at Botsford Ketchum. In 1967, he and his older brother, Bradford, formed Boston & Boston Design, one of the first Black-owned agencies in the United States. The two had worked together previously in 1963 producing a series of posters for the Council on Negro Affairs. Boston & Boston Design's clients included Beckman Instruments, Chiat/Day Advertising, and Concord Electronics.

In 1969, after two years working together, Archie left Boston & Boston Design, wanting to return to advertising agency work where he would be able to see his concepts realized through published ads. He took a position at his previous employer, Carson/Roberts, but shortly after rejoined Botsford Ketchum, where he remained until 1977. At Botsford Ketchum, Boston worked on campaigns for Motorola, Raytheon, Yamaha, and Pentel, rounding out his advertising skills with copywriting, notably writing the headline for a Pentel ad, "I told Pentel what to do with their pens. And they did it." He also started Archie Boston Graphic Design, an advertising and design consultancy, taking on clients beginning in 1973.

In 1972, at age 29, Boston became the president of the Art Director Club of Los Angeles, the second-largest in the nation, and was the first black president in the organization's 28-year history.

=== Design educator ===
Boston first began teaching when he was 23 at Chouinard Art Institute. After receiving his master's degree from the University of Southern California in 1977, he began a 32-year-long stint as a full lecturer in the Department of Art at California State University, Long Beach. In 1978 he helped to found the design department that later became the Visual Communications Design program. During his time at Cal State Long Beach, he served 12 terms as the department chair. He retired from teaching in 2009.

== Impact and legacy ==
During his first sabbatical at California State University Long Beach, Boston realized the documentary, 20 Outstanding Los Angeles Designers. For this film, he interviewed leading Los Angeles designers including Saul Bass, Marion Sampler, Robert Miles Runyan, Louis Danziger, April Greiman, among other designers. The proceeds from the resulting documentary funded a scholarship for design students in need.

In 2018, with his brother David, he co-produced and served as creative director on the documentary, Black Pioneers of the Sunshine City. The film chronicles the pioneering work of activist members of the Black community members in St. Petersburg, Florida

== Recognitions and accomplishments ==
- 1972 First African American president of the Art Directors Club of Los Angeles, where he served two terms.
- 2004 California State University names Boston Outstanding Professor of the Year.
- 2007 AIGA Fellows Award, L.A. Chapter of AIGA
- 2017 Boston and his work were featured in episode 4 of the multi-part series The Real Mad Men of Advertising
- 2021 AIGA Medalist
- Graphic Design: USA named him as one of 35 design pioneers.
- Awarded for his work in Art Directors Club Shows including New York, San Francisco, and Los Angeles
- In 2018, Duke University acquired Boston's entire body of work dating from 1963.

== External resources ==
- Archie Boston papers, Duke University. https://archives.lib.duke.edu/catalog/bostonarchie
- Archie Boston graphic design files, circa 1970s–2010s https://searchworks.stanford.edu/view/13901957
- Archie Boston, Boston & Boston promotion, "For a Discriminating Designer" https://www.notion.so/peoplesgraphicdesignarchive/For-a-Discriminating-Design-Poster-946c2e2f26ff4897bf34035d195f4e4f
