= O Rappa =

Brazilian reggae rock band

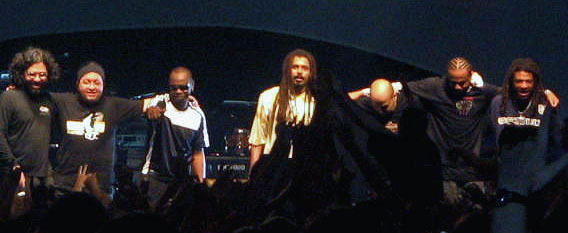
- O Rappa in 2005

Background information
- Origin: Rio de Janeiro, Brazil
- Genres: Reggae rock; funk rock; rap rock; samba rock
- Years active: 1993–2018
- Label: Warner Music
- Past members: Marcelo Falcão; Alexandre Menezes; Marcelo Lobato; Marcelo Yuka; Nelson Meirelles; Lauro Farias
- Website: www.orappa.com.br

O Rappa was a Brazilian reggae rock band from Rio de Janeiro, Brazil. Combining many styles such as rock, reggae, funk, hip hop and samba, many of O Rappa's songs contain sharp protests against the social problems in Brazil and the members of the band themselves are supporters of numerous social projects.

== History ==
In 1993, reggae artist Papa Winnie came to Brazil but had no band to play shows with him. He immediately picked four people: Nelson Meirelles, Marcelo Lobato, Alexandre Menezes and Marcelo Yuka as the band. After Papa Winnie's shows, the four decided to stay together picking Falcão as the 5th member and vocalist.

In 1994, they released their first album, on WEA, O Rappa. It was initially only known to small groups within the working class suburbs of Rio de Janeiro. In 1996 the album Rappa Mundi was released. Most of the music was a success, especially the cover of "Hey Joe", a song made famous by The Jimi Hendrix Experience.

However it was not until the third album Lado B Lado A in 1999, that O Rappa gained widespread fame selling over 150 000 copies of that album. Their video clip for their song Minha Alma ("My Soul") was also held in high regard winning many MTV Brasil's Vídeo Music Awards.

In November 2000, drummer Marcelo Yuka was shot during a robbery. He tried to avoid the assault by slamming his car against the bandits. The incident left him a paraplegic and he was forced to leave the band. He was replaced by Marcelo Lobato.

In August 2001, the group released its first live album, Instinto Coletivo ao Vivo. It featured a couple of tracks recorded in the studio with the participation of Sepultura and Asian Dub Foundation.

On 7 July 2007, O Rappa performed at the Brazilian leg of Live Earth in Rio de Janeiro.

In 2008 they released 7 Vezes. In 2010, was released their third live album and third DVD, Ao Vivo na Rocinha, which was recorded during a concert at Rocinha, Rio de Janeiro's largest favela. The album featured the band's biggest hits as well as many b-side tracks.

On May 3, 2017, the group announced on Facebook that after the end of their tour in February 2018, it will pause with no current plans to return.

== Discography ==
=== Studio albums ===
- (1994) O Rappa
- (1996) Rappa Mundi
- (1999) Lado B Lado A
- (2003) O Silêncio Q Precede O Esporro
- (2008) 7 Vezes
- (2013) Nunca Tem Fim...

=== Live albums ===
- (2001) Instinto Coletivo
- (2005) Acústico MTV: O Rappa
- (2010) Ao Vivo na Rocinha
- (2016) Acústico Oficina Francisco Brennand
- (2017) Marco Zero

=== Video albums ===
- (2004) O Silêncio Q Precede O Esporro (Toca do Bandido + Documentário + Show no Olimpo)
- (2005) Acústico MTV: O Rappa
- (2010) Ao Vivo na Rocinha
- (2016) Acústico Oficina Francisco Brennand
- (2017) Marco Zero

=== Singles ===
List of singles as lead artist, with selected chart positions, showing year released and album name
Year	Title	Peak chart positions	Album
Year	Title	BRA Hot 100	Album
1996	"Pescador de Ilusões"	—	Rappa Mundi
1996	"A Feira"	—	Rappa Mundi
1997	"Miséria S.A"	—	Rappa Mundi
1999	"Me Deixa"	50	Lado B Lado A
1999	"Minha Alma"	15	Lado B Lado A
2000	"O Que Sobrou do Céu"	55	Lado B Lado A
2000	"Lado B, Lado A"	45	Lado B Lado A
2001	"Instinto Coletivo"	90	Instinto Coletivo
2001	"Ninguém Regula a América" (part. Sepultura)	49	Instinto Coletivo
2003	"Reza Vela"	25	O Silêncio Q Precede O Esporro
2004	"Rôdo Cotidiano"	42	O Silêncio Q Precede O Esporro
2004	"O Salto"	16	O Silêncio Q Precede O Esporro
2005	"Mar de Gente"	29	O Silêncio Q Precede O Esporro
2005	"Na Frente do Reto"	3	Acústico MTV: O Rappa
2005	"Pescador de Ilusões" (acústico)	8	Acústico MTV: O Rappa
2006	"Não Perca as Crianças de Vista" (acústico)	35	Acústico MTV: O Rappa
2006	"Eu Quero Ver Gol" (acústico)	57	Acústico MTV: O Rappa
2008	"Monstro Invisível"	5	7 Vezes
2008	"Meu Mundo é o Barro"	16	7 Vezes
2009	"Súplica Cearense"	14	7 Vezes
2009	"Hóstia"	—	7 Vezes
2010	"7 Vezes" (ao vivo)	—	Ao Vivo na Rocinha
2013	"Anjos (Pra Quem Tem Fé)"	25	Nunca Tem Fim...
2013	"Auto-Reverse"	23	Nunca Tem Fim...

== Band members ==
Final line-up

- Marcelo Falcão - lead vocals, rhythm guitar, acoustic guitar (1993–2018)
- Alexandre Menezes (Xandão) - lead guitar, backing vocals (1993–2018)
- Marcelo Lobato - keyboards, samplers, backing vocals (1993–2018); drums (2001–2008); MIDI vibraphone (2008–2018)
- Lauro Farias - bass, synth bass, backing vocals (1995–2018)

Other members

- Nelson Meirelles - bass (1993–1995)
- Marcelo Yuka - drums (1993–2001, died 2019)

Touring members

- Rodrigo Teixeira (DJ Nuts) - scratches, turntables (1996–1997)
- Wellington Soares - percussion (1996–2001)
- Wellington Inácio (DJ Negralha) - turntables, samplers, percussion (1998–2018), backing vocals (2001–2018)
- Paulo Negueba - percussion (2001–2002)
- Cleber Sena - percussion (2003-2008), drums (2005–2013)
- Marcos Lobato - keyboards, samplers (2001–2018), backing vocals (2001–2004)
- Felipe Boquinha - drums (2013–2018)
