= Terbuthylazine =

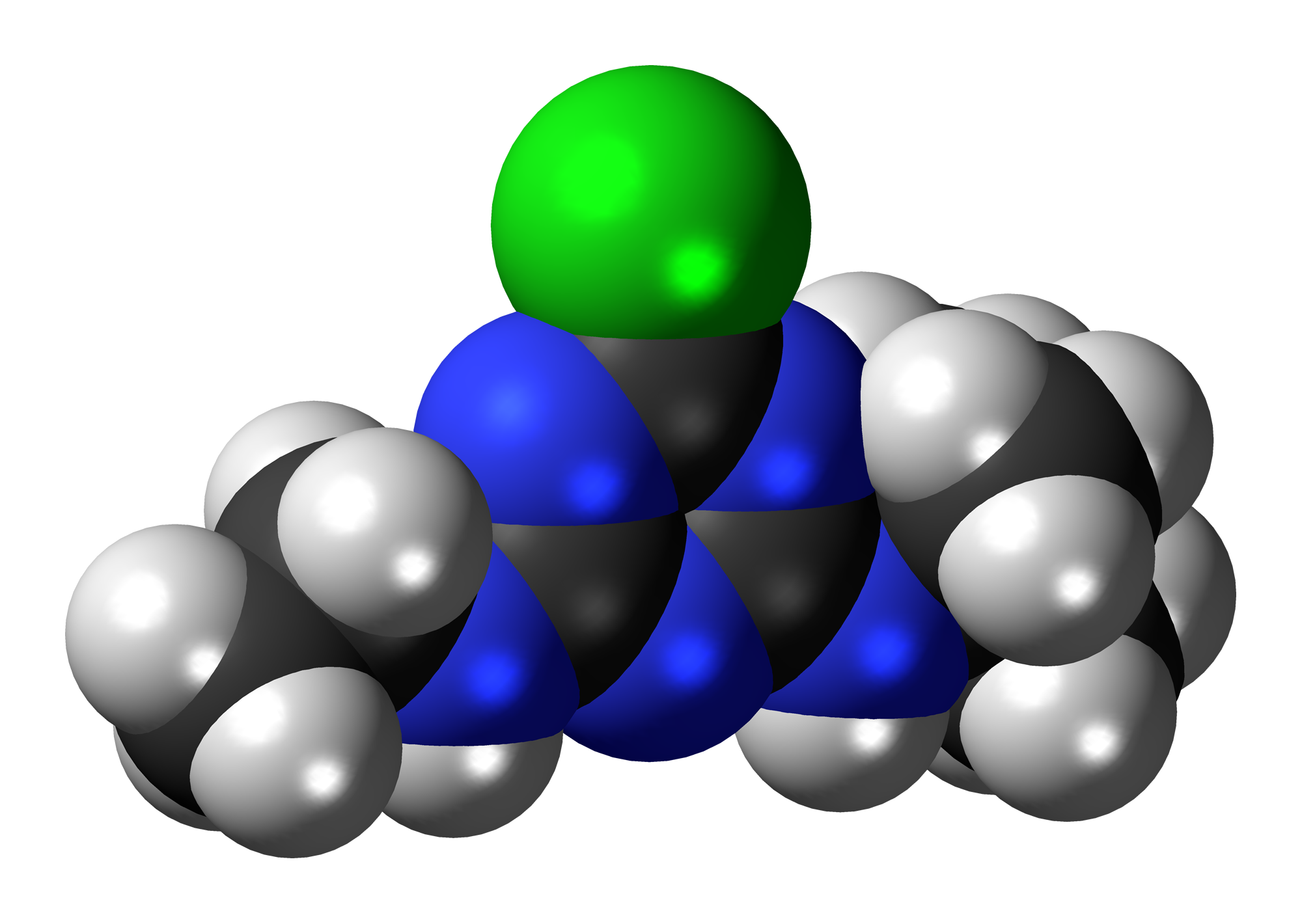

Names
- Preferred IUPAC name N^{2}-tert-Butyl-6-chloro-N^{4}-ethyl-1,3,5-triazine-2,4-diamine

Identifiers
CAS Number	5915-41-3
3D model (JSmol)	Interactive image
ChEBI	CHEBI:30263
ChemSpider	20848
ECHA InfoCard	100.025.125
KEGG	C18810
PubChem CID	22206
UNII	M095B391J7
CompTox Dashboard (EPA)	DTXSID4027608
- InChI: InChI=1S/C9H16ClN5/c1-5-11-7-12-6(10)13-8(14-7)15-9(2,3)4/h5H2,1-4H3,(H2,11,12,13,14,15) Key: FZXISNSWEXTPMF-UHFFFAOYSA-N; InChI=1/C9H16ClN5/c1-5-11-7-12-6(10)13-8(14-7)15-9(2,3)4/h5H2,1-4H3,(H2,11,12,13,14,15) Key: FZXISNSWEXTPMF-UHFFFAOYAN
- SMILES: Clc1nc(nc(n1)NC(C)(C)C)NCC

Properties
Chemical formula	C_{9}H_{16}ClN_{5}
Molar mass	229.710 g/mol
Density	1.19 g/cm^{3}
Melting point	176 to 179 °C (349 to 354 °F; 449 to 452 K)
- Except where otherwise noted, data are given for materials in their standard state (at 25 °C [77 °F], 100 kPa). verify (what is ?) Infobox references

Terbuthylazine is a selective herbicide. Chemically, it is a halogenated triazine; compared with atrazine (1958 inv., Geigy lab) and simazine, it has a tert-butyl group −[C−(CH_{3})_{3}] in place of the isopropyl −[CH−(CH_{3})_{2}] and ethyl group, respectively. The sim-azine molecule with 2 ethyl groups is symmetric and flat (excepting its equal NH−C_{2}H_{5} ends). The threefold substituted triazines have resonance of the free (non-bonding, $\pi$-) electron pairs, resulting in equivalent mesomeric structures.

Simazine remains active in the soil for 2 to 7 months or longer after application. Atrazine remains in soil for a matter of months (although in some soils can persist to at least 4 years) and can migrate from soil to groundwater.

Terbuthylazine's HRAC classification is Group C1, Group C (global, Aus), Group 5 (numeric), as it inhibits photosynthesis at photosystem II.

== Ecology ==
From an ecotoxicology perspective, terbuthylazine adversely affects aquatic organisms. It is not readily biodegradable. The median EC50 (96 hours) for algae is 0.04 mg/l. In Switzerland, the annual average limit for terbuthylazine concentrations in surface waters was set at 0.22 µg/l. In 2022, routine monitoring of 14-day sampling periods across 38 water bodies in Switzerland detected concentrations exceeding this limit on 11 occasions.
