= Sampler =

Sampler may refer to:

- Sampler (signal), a digital signal processing device that converts a continuous signal to a discrete signal
- Sampler (needlework), a handstitched piece of embroidery used to demonstrate skill in needlework
- Sampler (surname)
- A quilt where each block is constructed using a different pattern
- Sampler, or hydrocarbon well logging, or mud logger
- In sampling (medicine), the instrument used

== Music ==
- Sampler (musical instrument), a device used to create digital recordings called samples
- Sampler (Cardiacs album), 1995
- Sampler (Cat Empire EP)
- Sampler (Plumb EP)
- Sampler album, a type of compilation album
  - In Store Jam, a promotional compilation by Jamiroquai

== See also ==
- Sample (disambiguation)
- Sampling (disambiguation)
