= Sampling =

Sampling may refer to:

- Sampling (signal processing), converting a continuous signal into a discrete signal
- Sampling (graphics), converting continuous colors into discrete color components
- Sampling (music), the reuse of a sound recording in another recording
  - Sampler (musical instrument), an electronic musical instrument used to record and play back samples
- Sampling (statistics), selection of observations to acquire some knowledge of a statistical population
- Sampling (case studies), selection of cases for single or multiple case studies
- Sampling (audit), application of audit procedures to less than 100% of population to be audited
- Sampling (medicine), gathering of matter from the body to aid in the process of a medical diagnosis and/or evaluation of an indication for treatment, further medical tests or other procedures.
- Sampling (occupational hygiene), detection of hazardous materials in the workplace
- Sampling (for testing or analysis), taking a representative portion of a material or product to test (e.g. by physical measurements, chemical analysis, microbiological examination), typically for the purposes of identification, quality control, or regulatory assessment. See Sample (material).

Specific types of sampling include:

- Chorionic villus sampling, a method of detecting fetal abnormalities
- Food sampling, the process of taking a representative portion of a food for analysis, usually to test for quality, safety or compositional compliance. (Not to be confused with Food, free samples, a method of promoting food items to consumers)
- Oil sampling, the process of collecting samples of oil from machinery for analysis
- Theoretical sampling, the process of selecting comparison cases or sites in qualitative research
- Water sampling, the process of taking a portion of water for analysis or other testing, e.g. drinking water to check that it complies with relevant water quality standards, or river water to check for pollutants, or bathing water to check that it is safe for bathing, or intrusive water in a building to identify its source.
- Work sampling, a method of estimating the standard time for manufacturing operations.

== See also ==
- Sample (disambiguation)
- Sampler (disambiguation)
