= Louis Danziger =

American graphic designer and design educator

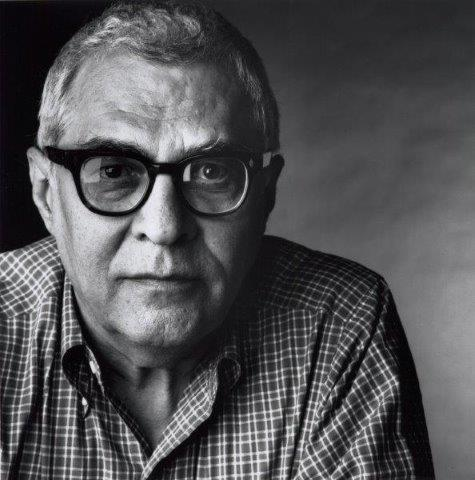
- Danziger in 2008
- Born: November 17, 1923 (age 102); Brooklyn, New York City, U.S.
- Education: Evander Childs High School, Art Center School, New School
- Known for: Graphic design, advertising, teaching
- Awards: 1998 AIGA Gold Medal, many others

Louis Danziger (born November 17, 1923) is an American graphic designer and design educator. He is most strongly associated with the late modern movement in graphic design, and with a community of designers from various disciplines working in Southern California in the mid-twentieth century. He is noted for his iconoclastic approach to design, and for introducing the principles of European constructivism to the American advertising vernacular.

In 1998, Danziger was awarded the AIGA Gold Medal for "standards of excellence over a lifetime of work."

Danziger retired from design work in the early 1970s, to work as a consultant and educator. He has held faculty positions with ArtCenter, Chouinard, CalArts and Harvard University.

== Early life ==
Louis Danziger was born on November 17, 1923, in Brooklyn, and raised in The Bronx, New York.

At age eleven, Danziger was enrolled in courses in art and poster design run by the Federal Art Project: "Their art classes turned me into a designer," Danziger later said. He began to browse the German design magazine Gebrauchsgraphik, which was available at the Fordham Public Library, and which he later credited with piquing his interest in typography, and with establishing his high visual standards. As an art major at Evander Childs High School, Danziger received a free student membership to the Museum of Modern Art: as a consequence Danziger was exposed to the modern-art movements of Futurism, Constructivism, and Dadaism, and studied the work of Picasso, Matisse, and Klee.

Danziger prepared for a career as a commercial artist. As a teenager, he worked as an apprentice at United Litho Company and silkscreen shop S&K. He also worked as a stage designer at Berkshire Country Club in the Catskill Mountains, and as an assistant to the art director at Delehanty Institute.

After high school, Danziger served in the Army in the South Pacific (New Guinea, the Admiralties, the Philippines, and Japan), where he was a Staff Sergeant and worked as a radio operator and communication chief, from 1943 through 1945.

He turned 100 on November 17, 2023.

== Education and influences ==
After his discharge from the Army, and eager to escape cold weather, Danziger moved to Los Angeles and enrolled in the ArtCenter School on the G.I. Bill.

At Art Center, Danziger encountered the first of two teachers who would be particularly influential: graphic designer Alvin Lustig. "I didn't like school at all, because it was very rigid at that time. But one day I heard this voice coming out of a classroom talking about social structure, religion, and the broadest implications of design. So I stuck my nose in the door and saw that it was Lustig. From then on I sat in on every class," said Danziger. From Lustig, Danziger learned how graphic design connected to the worlds of art, music, and literature, and that design could have social and cultural importance: "(Lustig) made me feel, naively, that I could move the earth by putting pencil to paper."

Danziger left school less than two years later, and began to work as a freelance graphic designer. Discouraged by the scarcity of opportunities available in Los Angeles at the time, Danziger returned to New York City; while working at Esquire, he enrolled in the famous 'Graphic Journalism' evening class of graphic designer Alexey Brodovitch, at The New School for Social Research. Danziger was encouraged by Brodovitch's enthusiasm for Danziger's portfolio of work, and was inspired by Brodovitch's insistence on originality and authenticity, and his view of design as a simple, joyful activity: "(Brodovitch taught that) design needs no justification other than the pleasure of the act itself," said Danziger.

Danziger has spoken frequently about the twin influences of Lustig and Brodovitch, each very different from the other in style, focus, and temperament: "One said 'night,' and the other said 'day.'" Danziger observed that the differences between these two teachers helped him to resist the impulse to imitate either, and instead compelled him to develop his independent style and voice: "I always felt that it was the contradictions between my two masters that allowed me to form my own point of view."

Though noted for his intellectualism, Danziger describes himself primarily as an auto-didact: "(Reading) constituted the major part of my design education." He has cited as formative texts Buckminster Fuller's 'Nine Chains to the Moon,' György Kepes' 'Language of Vision,' Louis Sullivan's 'Kindergarten Chats,' and Paul Rand's 'Thoughts on Design.' Rand's writing in particular imprinted on Danziger the importance of identifying a solution to each design problem that connected closely to the visual language and conceptual territory of the subject matter, and the power of visual metaphors as a tool of communication.

== Work ==
Danziger returned to Los Angeles in late 1948, where he studied architecture briefly at the California School of Art, under Raphael Soriano. He began an independent practice, offering graphic design, advertising, and consulting services, in Los Angeles in 1949.

Prolific and efficient in his work, Danziger created thousands of works of design over the next three decades, including advertising, book covers, magazines and catalogs, packaging, logos, album covers, and exhibition design. His client base grew from small local entities to large national corporations and organizations. His clients included charitable and cultural institutions (Los Angeles County Museum of Art, Skirball Museum, International Design Conference at Aspen, Eleanor Roosevelt Institute for Cancer Research), educational institutions (UCLA), and many commercial enterprises (Flax Artist's Materials, Container Corporation of America, Kwikset Locks, Gelvetex, Vivitar, Clinton Laboratories, TRW, Dreyfus Company, and others).

Among Danziger's better-known works:

- Print ad for General Lighting Company (1949)
- Logo and identity program for Flax Artist's Materials (1952)
- House campaign for Dreyfus Advertising Agency (1956)
- Print ad for Container Corporation of America (1958)
- Print ads and packaging for Clinton Laboratories (1959-1963)
- Posters for Los Angeles County Museum of Art (LACMA)'s Exhibition of New York School Painters (1965) and Exhibition of American Painting (1966)
- Catalogs for several Los Angeles County Museum of Art (LACMA) shows, most notably: New York School (1965), Exhibition of Japanese Art Treasures (1965), Art & Technology (1971), and The Avant Garde in Russia (1980)
- Advertising campaigns and packaging for Mamiya/Sekor (1966)
- Catalog cover, UCLA Extension (1990)

Danziger largely retired from studio work in 1972, although for several years after he served as a corporate design consultant for Atlantic Richfield Company (ARCO); he also consulted for Microsoft, LACMA, the National Endowment for the Arts (NEA), and others.

In 1995, Danziger donated his collection of visual work and related documents to the Design Archives of Rochester Institute of Technology, where it can be accessed by students, design scholars, and historians.

== Philosophy and approach ==
Although Danziger himself tends to eschew labels, he is most strongly associated with the late modern movement in graphic design and advertising design. Danziger's work is characterized by essential values associated with modernism, and more particularly with the principles of European constructivism:

- Economy of means. "I strive for elegance, using the word in its scientific sense: accomplishment with minimum means." Danziger's stated goal is to take "a minimal amount of material and a minimal amount of effort—nothing wasted—to achieve maximum impact." Danziger has noted frequently that the constraints of any project, whether budget, schedule, or client requirements, were simply a condition of the process and no obstacle to finding an effective solution.
- Appropriateness to the purpose. Danziger defines design as a useful, problem-solving activity rather than as an aesthetic pursuit. He insists on starting each project with a blank slate stylistically, in order to create a communication that is uniquely appropriate to that client and that situation: "The "look" is not brought to the work but rather emerges from the process." Similarly, he states: "I want solutions that make it difficult to separate form from content." Danziger rejects design that is (merely or primarily) aesthetically appealing as a vanity, and the province of the fine artist.
- Clarity. Danziger is intolerant of any ambiguity or obfuscation in communication: "I want to be clear. I never try to be subtle or clever." He observed: "I am concerned with the production of work that demonstrates intelligence … there is continually a search for clarity and depth rather than cleverness."
- Social responsibility. Danziger insists on viewing design as an ethical pursuit, mindful of its impact on its audience. "As socially responsible people we try to accomplish (our clients') objectives in a positive way. We do this by providing some services for our audience. We provide information, entertainment, and aesthetic pleasure." He observed that ethics in design "is primarily about being responsible for what one does. In the case of communication design, the number one rule is not to deceive." In contrast to designers who shunned advertising as banal or corrupt, Danziger embraced advertising as an important part of his practice, reasoning that he could change and improve the world of advertising by offering the audience work that was intelligent, respectful, and valuable to them.

Danziger is also viewed as a seminal figure in the burgeoning graphic design and advertising industry in Southern California in the mid-twentieth century, which was noted for its experimentalism, its reverence for modern art, and its indifference to the strict design traditions of the east coast. Danziger's work was additionally informed by his own knowledge of design history.

Danziger resisted the stylistic signatures that are common to many graphic designers: this contributed to a sort of visual timelessness in his design, which critics have described as "effortless" and "classic." Danziger is noted for his innovative uses of photography in advertising, including overlaying multiple photographic negatives to create a new image, presenting tiny objects as enormous on the page, in order to draw new attention to them, and the deft use of visual metaphors. Together, these techniques embodied a "revolutionary redefinition of the photograph" as an element of communication.

Danziger had an early interest in the potential application of computers in graphic design, taking a course at UCLA Extension in the fundamentals of computer science in 1955. Later Danziger worked with programmers at the California Institute of Technology to create perhaps the first logo to be designed with the aid of a computer (for Xybion Corporation, in 1975).

== Colleagues and collaborators ==
By and large, Danziger worked alone, managing his firm largely without design assistants or professional collaborators. He noted that he preferred to do fewer projects, but to retain more control over production of each piece. With few exceptions, his work incorporated his own photography.

Nevertheless, Danziger was closely connected with a group of designers from various disciplines who were active in Southern California from the 1950s to the 1970s, including Charles and Ray Eames, and the 'Design Group' (a group that consisted primarily of Alvin Lustig's students, which was active from 1948 to the early 1970s). These designers were not Danziger's direct collaborators; however, they met frequently, had common interests and preoccupations, and were cooperative and mutually influential. Danziger was something of an intellectual leader of this group: he was later described by his contemporary, graphic designer Deborah Sussman, as "a guru to everyone (in this confederation of designers)." Designer Saul Bass said that Danziger "shaped Los Angeles design activity into an intellectual dialogue and was a major inspiration."

In 1949, Danziger joined a loosely affiliated, short-lived group called the Society of Contemporary Designers, which also included Saul Bass, Alvin Lustig, Jerome Gould, and John Follis, and which included graphic, product, and exhibition designers. Danziger was described by Bass as "a critical link in the communal support system."

Danziger also enjoyed a close friendship and informal collaboration with graphic designer Paul Rand, and with Bauhaus master Herbert Bayer.

Danziger collaborated with architect Frank Gehry on the Danziger House and Studio (1965), a studio/residence which Danziger and his wife occupied until 1995. This project was one of the first of Gehry's projects to receive widespread attention.

== Teaching ==
Despite his own lack of formal education, Danziger became a noted design educator, a "charismatic pedagogue." Danziger is associated most closely with three schools: Harvard University, where he was a visiting professor in graphic design from 1978 to 1988; ArtCenter College of Design (formerly known as Art Center School), where he taught courses in advertising and graphic design starting in 1958; and California Institute of the Arts (CalArts, formerly known as Chouinard Art Institute), where he taught from 1963 to 1979, and served as the director of the Graphic Design Department from 1972 to 1979. At CalArts, Danziger was credited with helping to create the first academic course ever offered in the history of graphic design; and, averse to the promotion of a single point of view in design education, he was noted for recruiting faculty who represented a diverse range of styles.

Danziger's teaching reflects the influence of Lustig, Brodovitch, Buckminster Fuller, El Lissitzky, Rand, and others, but filtered and interpreted through his own research and practice, and incorporating his own sense of humor. Danziger is famous among students for his pithy aphorisms, among them:

- "The solution to the problem lies within the problem." (Create a design solution that is germane to the subject matter: don't borrow interest.)
- "Close the open doors." (Remove all elements that might interfere with the intended communication.)
- "If it's not helping you, it's hurting you." (Remove unnecessary elements, because they are distractions.)
- "Analysis of the problem is the most significant part of the design process." (Research, and think, before beginning to design.)
- "If it's 'in,' it's out." (Resist the lure of fashion, or imitating what's 'cool.')
- "You are the best you." (Don't imitate. Be authentic in your life and work.)

In a 1998 interview coinciding with the awarding of the AIGA Gold Medal, Danziger summed up his advice to students in this way:

"Work. Think. Feel."

Work: "No matter how brilliant, talented, exceptional and wonderful the student may be, without work there is nothing but potential and talk."

Think: "Design is a problem-solving activity. Thinking is the application of intelligence to arrive at the appropriate solution to the problem."

Feel: "Work without feeling, intuition, and spontaneity is devoid of humanity."

Many of Danziger's students rose to prominence in the design field, among them John Plunkett (founding designer of Wired), Neil Kellerhouse, Mikio Osaki, Frank Cheatham, Ray Engle, Robert Geers, Robert Overby, Sam Smidt, Roland Young, Archie Boston, Judy Johnson, John Van Hamersveld, Laurie Raskin, Tracey Shiffman, Dale Herigstad, Gregory Thomas, Don Chang, Sean Adams, Troy Alders, Noreen Morioka, Lars M. Busekist, Ian Grais, Kristen Ding, Dan Goods, Maria Moon, Miya Osaki, Maggy Cuesta, among others.

Danziger has been critical of some schools and trends in design education—in particular, many schools' rigidity, their emphasis on fashionability, and their imprinting of students with a uniform design style: "Most schools produce students whose work is interchangeable. The skills they teach are obsolete by the time a student graduates. If students are trained (instead) as genuine problem-solvers, they are able to deal with an unknown tomorrow."

== Influence and impact ==
Danziger is credited with influencing several generations of contemporary American advertising art directors and graphic designers, both through his work and through his teaching.

In addition, Danziger's influence extended outside the United States. In 1957, when traveling to Italy to study the work of Italian designers, Danziger discovered that many Italian designers knew and admired his work already: graphic designer Massimo Vignelli said that it was the work of Danziger and Saul Bass that inspired him to come to the United States.

== Awards, honors and exhibitions ==
- Exhibition, Society of Typographic Arts, Chicago (1955)
- Elected Member of Alliance Graphique Internationale (AGI) (1974)
- Los Angeles County Museum of Art (LACMA), The Modern and Contemporary Art Council's Award for Distinguished Achievement (1982), honoring "men and women prominent in the cultural life of Los Angeles," alongside Ray Bradbury, Ray Eames, Norman Lear, Billy Wilder, John Williams, Richard Diebenkorn.
- Distinguished Designer Fellowship, National Endowment for the Arts (NEA) (1985)
- Pacific Design Center "Stars of Design" Lifetime Achievement Award (1997)
- Gold Medal, American Institute of Graphic Arts (AIGA) (1998)
- Lifetime Achievement Award, ArtCenter College of Design (2011)
- Exhibition, Los Angeles County Museum of Art, Pacific Standard Time: Art in L.A., 1945–1980 (2011-2012)

Danziger's work is included and exhibited in the permanent collections of several design and art museums, including the Museum of Modern Art (New York), the Los Angeles County Museum of Art, and the Library of Congress.

In 2013, in honor of Danziger's 90th birthday, an exhibition of Danziger's key works was mounted at ArtCenter College of Design in Pasadena, California.
