= Nunca Tem Fim... =

Studio album by O Rappa
- Released: August 15, 2013
- Genre: Reggae fusion; funk rock; rap rock
- Length: 53:22
- Label: Warner Music
- Producer: Tom Saboia

O Rappa chronology
7 Vezes (2008)	Nunca Tem Fim... (2013)

Nunca Tem Fim... (Portuguese: Never Ends...) is the ninth and final studio album by Brazilian band O Rappa. The album was released on August 15, 2013 distributed through Warner Music. It was produced by Tom Saboia and mastered by Stephen Marcussen (Aerosmith, Nirvana, Paul McCartney) in California.

In 2014, the album was nominated to Latin Grammy for Best Brazilian Rock Album.

== Track listing ==
No.	Title	Guest artist	Length
1.	"O Horizonte É Logo Alí"		3:48
2.	"Auto-Reverse"		4:45
3.	"Boa Noite Xangô"		4:44
4.	"Cruz de Tecido"		6:16
5.	"Fronteira (D.U.C.A)"		5:31
6.	"Anjos (Pra Quem Tem Fé)"		6:59
7.	"Doutor, Sim Senhor!"		6:12
8.	"Sequência Terminal"		3:37
9.	"Vida Rasteja"		5:17
10.	"Um Dia Lindo"	Edi Rock	6:10

=== Bonus tracks ===
No.	Title	Guest band	Length
11.	"Vem Pra Rua"		2:29
12.	"Everything Changes"	SOJA	5:10

== Personnel ==
O Rappa

- Marcelo Falcão - lead vocals (all tracks) and background vocals (all tracks), rhythm guitar (all tracks), handclaps (all tracks); beatbox (4); handclaps
- Xandão - lead guitar (all tracks); percussion
- Lauro Farias - bass (all tracks); handclaps
- Marcelo Lobato - keyboards (all tracks), piano (all tracks), synthesizers (all tracks), samplers (all tracks); vibraphone, celesta, gong, glockenspiel, melodica, steelpan, tambura, theremin

Additional musicians

- Felipe Boquinha - drums (all tracks), timbales (1, 5)
- Negralha - turntables (all tracks)
- Tom Sabóia - electric guitars, percussion, handclaps

In order of track

- Zé Nobrega, Doguinha, JBF - other handclaps (2)
- Lula Queiroga - guest vocals (3)
- Marcos Lobato - slide and dobro guitars (3), additional synthesizers (10)
- Thiago Osório - tuba and flute (7)
- Davi Pinheiro Gomes - trombone (7–8)
- Enéas Gomes - trumpet (7–8)
- Luiz Carlos Evam - saxophone (7–8)
- Alexandre Duayer - tremolo guitar (8)
- Léo Antunes - trombone (10)
- Pedro Selector - trumpet (10)
- André Ramos - baritone saxophone (10)

Technical

- Tom Sabóia - production, mixing
- O Rappa - production
- Stephen Marcussen - mastering
- Zé Nobrega - assistant engineer: Estúdio Jimo
- Alexandre Duayer - assistant engineer: Estúdio Caroçu, guitar tech: Xandão
- Wellington Marques - assistant engineer: Estúdio Caroçu
- Sérgio Santos - assistant engineer: Toca do Bandido
- Rafaela Prestes - assistant engineer: Toca do Bandido on "Boa Noite Xangô"

Artwork

- Mike Deodato, Jr. - artwork, illustration
- Leonardo Iza - colors, illustration
- Eduardo Francisco - booklet illustration: DJ and black-and-white
- Gabriel Wiokbolo - photography
- Klaus Vluller - photography assistant
- Bira Farias - graphic project
