= Sample (surname) =

Sample is a surname. Notable people with the surname include:

- Alexander Sample (born 1960), Catholic bishop in Michigan
- Bill Sample (born 1946), member of the Arkansas Senate
- Billy Sample (born 1955), former professional baseball player
- Cameron Sample (born 1999), American football player
- Drew Sample (born 1996), American football player
- James Sample, several persons
- Joe Sample (1939–2014), American jazz musician
- Johnny Sample (1937–2005), former professional American football defensive back
- Robert Sample (died 1718), North American pirate
- Steven Sample, president of the University of Southern California
- Tex Sample (born 1934), sociologist of religion
- Tim Sample (born 1951), New England humorist
- William Sample (1898–1945), Rear Admiral in the United States Navy

== See also ==
- Sampler (surname)
- Samples (surname)
