= Flax Art Supply Stores =

American art supply store chain

Flax is a group of art supply stores spread across the United States. As of January 2024, Flax family owned and operated specialty retail stores are located in San Francisco, Oakland, Orlando and Chicago. Existing Flax stores in Atlanta and Los Angeles are owned and operated by former employees of those stores.

The Flax businesses were founded between 1919 and 1946 by four Flax brothers, with locations in New York, Los Angeles, San Francisco and Chicago. The business entities have always been independent of each other, yet through common branding they have represented a coast-to-coast Flax Art Supply presence.

== Beginnings ==
In 1903, Meyer Flax arrived in New York on the SS Pennsylvania from a small farming community in Russia. The eldest in a family of six children with four boys and two girls, Meyer earned enough over the next two years to send tickets back home for his siblings and parents so they could join him in America. The family settled in Bayonne, New Jersey. Meyer sent his two younger brothers, Louis and Sam, to school, while Herman, the second oldest and still a young teenager, joined Meyer’s growing painting and contracting business. In 1911, Louis was invited into the business before he and Herman spent time in World War I, after which the three brothers, Meyer, Herman and Louis, enjoyed much success until the 1930s.

Sam had secured his livelihood with an art supply business. When his three brothers lost their contracting business and all real estate holdings in the Great Depression, Sam invited them into his business to learn the art supply trade. Not wanting to compete with kin, eventually Meyer, Herman, and Louis each moved with their family to a different American city, spreading the Flax art supply stores across the country.

== Chronology ==
=== New York, est. 1919 ===
Sam Flax was sixteen years old when he answered a newspaper ad for his first and only employer, art supply dealer Sam Halpern. Ten years later in 1919, Sam Flax opened his own store in New York City, aptly named Sam Flax. All three of Sam's sons, Leonard, Sidney, and David, entered the business after World War II. Sidney opened a second store in Brooklyn in 1949, and was the first to implement the Flax style of creative merchandising when he introduced colorful neckties.

Over the next three decades, the brothers grew the business to five Sam Flax stores in New York. Sam Flax died in 1963. In 1973, David Flax established a new Sam Flax store in Atlanta, then in 1990 he opened another store in Orlando, Florida. In 2003, the two (see the 1980s) New York Sam Flax stores were sold to individuals outside the Flax family. A 95-year presence in New York came to an end in 2014, when the Midtown store closed its doors for good on Christmas Eve. Members of the Flax family originally from New York continue to operate the Orlando store, while the Atlanta store was sold to two long-time employees in 2018.

In 1988, Leonard Flax and his wife Kate founded Kate's Paperie, which was a separate business from Sam Flax Inc. Over the next 20 years Kate's grew to five stores in New York, and in 2008 the business was sold.

=== Los Angeles, est. 1931 ===
Meyer Flax moved his family to Los Angeles and established M. Flax, Inc. in 1931. His son, Harvey, a year after entering the business, opened a second store in 1950 in Westwood Village that he managed for more than 50 years. When he retired in 2005, the art supply store was sold, yet Flax carried on in Los Angeles. In 2002, Harvey's daughter, Joan Flax, opened Flax Pen to Paper with her husband Phil Clark, which they sold to an employee in 2020.

=== San Francisco Bay Area, est. 1938 ===
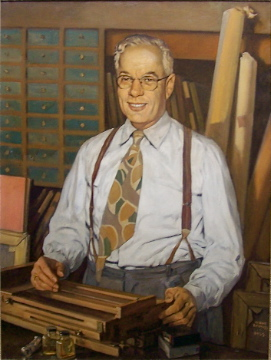
Portrait of Herman-Flax by Serge Ivanoff, San Francisco, 1954.

In 1938, Herman Flax moved his family to San Francisco and established Flax's Artist Materials. At the age of 62 Herman died, leaving the downtown San Francisco location to his sons, Philip and Jerry. Under Herman's tutelage, his son-in-law, Don Kavrell, opened a Flax art supply store in Oakland in the 1950s, and then moved the store and his family to Sacramento from 1959–1970.

Jerry Flax left the company in 1967 to lead the Electrostatic Printing Corporation (see xerography), for which he acquired the rights to commercialize the patented technology developed by Stanford engineer Clyde Childress. Ultimately, the process was purchased by Monsanto Chemical. In 1974 Jerry bought what was once the biggest competitor to Flax in San Francisco, Schwabacher-Frey. He first acquired the retail store and then its commercial division two years later.

Under Philip Flax a new Flax store opened in 1966, in the 27,000 square foot Goldberg Bowen Building at 250 Sutter Street. In 1978 a new location at 1699 Market Street opened, followed by the closure of the Sutter Street store in 1981. The company began distributing mail order catalogs nationally in 1984. Craig Flax oversaw the major growth and transition of the catalog business with an expanded range of gift-oriented items and eventually new specialty titles. Reflecting the broader product range, Flax's Artist Materials began doing business as FLAX art & design in 1991. Two new brands were developed, Collage and The Paper Catalog in 1995 and 1998 respectively, and featured photo albums, stationery, fine pens, and decorative papers marketed through catalogs and eCommerce websites. Through 2002 - 2003, Flax acquired the assets of Reliable Home Office, T. Shipley and Sparks.com. In 2005, the company achieved a ranking in Internet Retailers Top 500 Guide. Flax ceased all direct marketing activities by the end of 2007 and returned its focus to brick and mortar activity.

In 2010 the leadership of the company formally transitioned to the third generation, led by Howard Flax. FLAXart.com relaunched as an eCommerce website in October 2014, with a wide range of products for art and craft enthusiasts.

Over the weekend of November 7–8, 2015, Flax celebrated the Grand Opening of a new store at the Fort Mason Center for Arts & Culture in San Francisco. Fort Mason is part of the Golden Gate National Recreation Area, which is managed by the National Park Service, making Flax the only art supply store in the country to operate within a national park.

After 38 years operating a retail store at 1699 Market Street, the company was forced to relocate. The building was slated for redevelopment into a condominium highrise. In looking for a new headquarters location in San Francisco, Flax found itself competing with technology companies seeking the same type of creative spaces. In March, 2016, Flax closed the Market Street store and opened a new store in Downtown Oakland.

=== Chicago, est. 1946 ===
Looking for an opportunity and based upon information from industry wholesalers, including a tip from Max Grumbacher himself, Chicago is where The Flax Co. established itself in 1946 by Louis Flax, and his sons Don and Al following their return from World War II. Like their father, Don and Al learned the business by working under Sam Flax in New York. By 1970 the company grew to have two businesses: a primary 14,000 sq ft store in the Chicago Loop and a smaller retail store led by Al, and Regents Products Co., a wholesaling business run by Don. Louis presided over both as president until he died in 1971. The retail business began concentrating on the framing category in the 1980s, and Al's son Brian continues to run the company under the name Flax Art & Frame.

In 1979, Al and Don purchased Meyer's Art Supply in Phoenix. Don moved there, and was soon after joined by Al's son Doug, who took over management of the 15,000 sq. ft. Phoenix Flax store upon Don's retirement in 1990. Following Al's death in 2003 the store closed the following year, primarily hastened by a poor economy. Like their Uncle Sam, both Al and Don served as Directors for the art supply industry organization NAMTA, with Don serving as its president from 1961–1963.

== The 1980s ==
The advent of desktop publishing and CAD in the 1980s brought a dramatic change to the art supply industry. Prior to that period, an art supply retail business could expect up to 65% of sales from commercial sources, which included business from advertising, engineering and architectural firms. Layouts and designs were created manually using materials such as drafting supplies and rub-on lettering (see Letraset). When those processes shifted onto computers, a traditional source of revenue quickly dried up and art supply businesses had to adapt.

For the Flax stores, New York closed all but one art supply branch in that city(and Kate's Paperie opened, which tapped into a growing demand for unique paper products); San Francisco diversified into mail order with new product categories; and Chicago shifted their emphasis to picture frames and framing services.

== Collaborative branding ==
The Flax logo designed by Louis Danziger

In 1952, Harvey Flax from the Los Angeles based Flax business, commissioned a young designer named Louis Danziger to create a new trademark. The logo was originally intended to support a private label program for a new formula of pressure sensitive rubber cement, but soon thereafter the 'F' was adopted and shared with the other Flax businesses across the country as a unifying branding element.

Danziger is one of the most respected graphic designers in America, distinguished by the AIGA award in 1998 for "standards of excellence over a lifetime of work". He has done work for Microsoft, General Lighting, and A & M Records among others, and went on to teach at his alma mater, Art Center College of Design. In his approach to design, Danziger’s goal was in “taking a minimal amount of material and a minimal amount of effort-nothing wasted-to achieve maximum impact.”

Featured in the book American Modernism: graphic design 1920–1960, the authors state “The ‘F’ is simply constructed, bold in weight and adaptable to many applications.” The Flax 'F' is in the permanent design collection of the Museum of Modern Art. From the early 1960s–1980, the Flax entities shared in the production and distribution of a commercial catalog that utilized Danziger's 'F'. The art supply catalog averaged 150 pages and featured thousands of items. More than 70 years later, the different Flax locations still use the original logo, though with some variations.

== Products ==
The Flax stores remain independently operated. Each has its own unique product assortment. Collectively, the available range includes paint, paper, drawing materials, drafting supplies, fine pens and writing paper, custom printing services, desk accessories, books, home decor items, photo albums, sketchbooks and journals, stationery, portfolios and presentation materials, bookbinding supplies, studio furniture, picture frames and framing, office supplies, paper crafts, scrapbooking, rubber stamping, urban art, digital printing services, digital arts, general crafts supplies and gifts.

== Founding dates and succession ==
The following does not include the extended Flax family, only those members who held or hold an involvement with one of the Flax art supply businesses.

Legend

1st Generation

2nd Generation

3rd Generation

- 1919, New York, by Sam Flax (1894–1963)
  - Sidney (1924–1976), Leonard (1928-2022), David (1933-2020)
    - Peter (son of Sidney), Lionel (son of Leonard), Sam (son of David)
- 1931, Los Angeles, by Meyer Flax (1883–1965)
  - Harvey (1921–2013)
    - Joan (daughter of Harvey)
- 1938, San Francisco, by Herman Flax (1892–1955)
  - Jerry (1922–1998), Philip(1933-2023)
    - Brandon Kavrell (son of Lita Flax), Marta and Steve (children of Jerry), Howard, Craig and Leslie (children of Philip)
- 1946, Chicago, by Louis Flax (1897–1971) and sons
  - Don (1921–2009), Al (1926–2003)
    - Brian and Doug (sons of Al)

2nd Generation Founding Dates in Other Cities

- 1973, Atlanta, GA, by David Flax
- 1979, Phoenix, AZ, by Don Flax
- 1979, Sunnyvale, CA, by Philip Flax
- 1990, Orlando, FL, by David Flax

3rd Generation Founding Dates in Other Cities

- 2016, Oakland, CA, by Howard Flax

New Ownership

- 2018, Atlanta, GA The Atlanta location was purchased from the Flax family by two long-time employees in 2018 and continues to operate under the Sam Flax name.
- 2020, Los Angeles, CA The Los Angeles location was sold by the Flax family to a long-time employee in 2020 and continues to operate under FLAX Pen to Paper

== Active Flax stores ==
Orlando, Sam Flax

Atlanta, Sam Flax

Los Angeles, Flax Pen to Paper

Oakland, FLAX art & design

San Francisco, Fort Mason Center for Arts & Culture, FLAX art & design

Chicago, Flax Art & Frame
