= Sampler (surname) =

Sampler is a surname. Notable people with the surname include:

- Marion Sampler (1920–1998), American designer
- Philece Sampler (1953–2021), American actress
- Samuel M. Sampler (1895–1979), United States Army soldier

== See also ==
- Sample (surname)
