= 7 Vezes =

Studio album by O Rappa
- Released: 15 August 2008
- Genre: Reggae fusion; funk rock; rap rock
- Length: 64:29
- Label: Warner Music
- Producer: Ricardo Vidal; Tom Sabóia; O Rappa

O Rappa chronology
Acústico MTV (2005)	7 Vezes (2008)	Nunca Tem Fim... (2013)

Professional ratings
Review scores
Source	Rating
Allmusic	3.5/5 stars

7 Vezes (Portuguese: 7 Times, stylized as "7X") is the seventh album by Brazilian band O Rappa. The title alludes to the fact that this is the seventh album O Rappa has released. It was produced by Ricardo Vidal, Tom Sabóia and O Rappa. The album was released in 2008 through Warner Music.

== Track listing ==
All tracks are written by Marcos Lobato, Marcelo Falcão, Xandão, Lauro Farias and Marcelo Lobato; unless otherwise noted.

No.	Title	Length
1.	"Meu Santo Tá Cansado"	5:08
2.	"Verdade De Feirante"	4:46
3.	"Hóstia"	3:23
4.	"Meu Mundo É O Barro"	4:39
5.	"Farpa Cortante"	4:16
6.	"Em Busca Do Porrão"	4:25
7.	"7 Vezes"	5:13
8.	"Monstro Invisível" (Falcão, Xandão, Farias, Lobato)	4:41
9.	"Maria"	5:17
10.	"Súplica Cearense" (Gordurinha, Nelinho)	6:03
11.	"Fininho Da Vida"	4:51
12.	"Documento"	4:00
13.	"Respeito Pela Mais Bela" (Vinícius Falcão, Marcelo Falcão, Xandão, Farias, Lobato)	3:52
14.	"Vários Holofotes"	3:55

== Personnel ==
O Rappa

- Marcelo Falcão - lead and background vocals, noises and raggas, acoustic guitar
- Xandão - lead guitar, baritone guitar, 12-string guitar, cavaquinho, bandolin
- Lauro Farias - bass, handclaps
- Marcelo Lobato - drums, marimba, basin, bottle, steelpan, kettle, vibraphone, harmonium, keyboards, bowls, tambura, trombone, melodica, accordion, metallophone, clogs, tin, can, cranberry, harpsichord, santoor, handclaps

Additional musicians

- Tom Sabóia - production, guitars, e-bow, keyboards, orchestration, handclaps
- Cleber Sena - drums, shaker, rattle, creole drum, goatnail, cajon, ElectroPad, bottle of water, can, bass drum, reco, caxixi, surdo, tamborica, cuíca, handclaps
- Bernardo Aguiar - rattle, shaker, clogs, agogô, triangle, pans, reco, goatnail, tambourine, badeiro, talk drum, derbak, perfuramaria, caxixi, mola
- Vinícius Falcão and André Rafael - backing vocals
- DJ Negralha - turntables, samples
- Marcos Lobato - keyboards, mandolin, dobro, banjo
- Sérgio Santos and Carlos Medeiros - handclaps
- Alexandre Duayer - guitars, handclaps
- Ricardo Vidal - surdo, caxixi, chimbal, reco, mini-conga
- Tuca - cuíca
- Nielson - surdo, tambourine, snare drum
- Wesley Assumpção - tambourine, snare drum, repique, surdo
