= O Silêncio Q Precede O Esporro =

Studio album by O Rappa
- Released: 2003
- Genre: Reggae fusion; samba rock; samba funk; rap rock
- Length: 69:56
- Label: Warner Music
- Producer: Tom Capone and O Rappa

O Rappa chronology
Instinto Coletivo Ao Vivo (2001)	O Silêncio Q Precede O Esporro (2003)	Acústico MTV (2005)

Professional ratings
Review scores
Source	Rating
Allmusic	4/5 stars

O Silêncio Q Precede O Esporro (Portuguese: The Silence Dat Precedes the Blast) is the fifth album by Brazilian band O Rappa, released in 2003 through Warner Music.

Produced by Tom Capone and the band, this was the first album without the lyricist and drummer Marcelo Yuka (the drums being took over by the keyboardist Marcelo Lobato; the lyrics being took over by Marcelo Lobato's brother — Marcos Lobato — and Marcelo Falcão.

== Track listing ==
1. "Intro 1" - 0:52
2. "Reza Vela" - 4:59
3. "Rodo Cotidiano" – 6:15
4. "Papo De Surdo E Mudo" – 5:45
5. "Bitterusso Champagne" - 6:52
6. "Mar De Gente" - 5:37
7. "O Salto" - 8:05
8. "Linha Vermelha" - 3:27
9. "Pára Pegador" - 4:19
10. "Intro 2" - 1:07
11. "Óbvio" - 5:33
12. "Maneiras" - 4:15
13. "O Novo Já Nasce Velho" - 4:11
14. "Deus Lhe Pague" - 5:06
15. "O Salto II" - 3:23

== Personnel ==
O Rappa

- Marcelo Falcão — vocals (all tracks except 1 and 10), acoustic guitar
- Xandão — electric and acoustic guitars
- Lauro Farias — electric bass, synth bass
- Marcelo Lobato — drums, keyboards, tubular bells, harmonium

Additional vocals

- Malena D'Álessio — rapping (11)
- Zeca Pagodinho — guest vocals (12)
- Waly Salomão — speaking voice [texts and poems] (7)

Guest musicians

- Tom Capone — additional effects
- DJ Negralha — turntables (3, 4, 6–9, 13, 14)
- DJ Nuts — turntables (11)
- Cleber Sena and Paulo Negueba — percussion (13)
- Gustavo da Lua — percussion (12)
- Marcos Lobato — banjo (5, 11, 15), dobro (5, 11, 15)
- Zequinha Pagodinho — cavaquinho (12)
- Marcelo Lobato and Glauco Fernandes — string arrangements (7)
- Glauco Fernandes — violins (7, 14, 15), concertmaster (15)
- Daniel Nogueira, Léo Ortiz, Pedro Mibielli, Herr Agapito, Flávio Gomes, Carlos Mendes, Erasmo Fernandes, Marluce Ferreira, Rogério Rosa, Rodolfo Toffolo and Verônica Gabler — violins (7, 14, 15)
- Flávia Motta, Isabela Passarotto, Jairo Diniz and Eduardo Pereira — violas (7, 14, 15)
- Marcelo Salles, Luiz Zamith, Lui Coimbra and Cláudia Sales — cellos (7, 14, 15)
