= Lado B Lado A =

Studio album by O Rappa
- Released: 1999
- Genre: Reggae fusion; funk rock; rap rock
- Length: 56:55
- Label: Warner Music
- Producer: Chico Neves; Bill Laswell ("Lado B Lado A" and "Na Palma da Mão" only)

O Rappa chronology
Rappa Mundi (1996)	Lado B Lado A (1999)	Instinto Coletivo Ao Vivo (2001)

Lado B Lado A (Portuguese: Side B Side A) is the third album by Brazilian band O Rappa. It was released in 1999 through Warner Music. Rolling Stone Brasil listed it as the 93rd best Brazilian music album.

In 2007, the title song was featured in the Brazilian film Tropa de Elite.

== Track listing ==
1. "Tribunal De Rua" - 4:21
2. "Me Deixa" - 4:08
3. "Cristo E Oxalá" - 4:26
4. "O Que Sobrou Do Céu" – 3:53
5. "Se Não Avisar O Bicho Pega" – 5:15
6. "Minha Alma (A Paz Que Eu Não Quero)" - 5:04
7. "Lado B Lado A" - 5:05
8. "Favela" - 3:21
9. "Homem Amarelo" - 4:17
10. "Nó De Fumaça" - 3:45
11. "A Todas As Comunidades Do Engenho Novo" - 6:18
12. "Na Palma Da Mão" - 7:02

== Personnel ==
O Rappa

- Marcelo Falcão - lead vocals; acoustic guitar (1, 11), electric guitar; tamborim (2–3); flute (11)
- Xandão - lead guitar (all tracks); goblet drum (10), vocals (5)
- Lauro Farias - bass guitar (all tracks except 3), keyboard bass (3); backing vocals
- Marcelo Lobato - keyboards (all tracks); cuica, vibraphone and talk box; congas (4); melodica, MPC programming, goblet drum, flute, backing vocals
- Marcelo Yuka - drums; vocals (1), goblet drum, cowbell and harmonium (6), keyboards; timbales (9), purrinhola (10), backing vocals

Guest musicians

- Bill Laswell - bass guitar outro (12)
- Carlos Eduardo Hack - fiddle (12)
- DJ Negralha - turntables (all tracks); brass quotes (2–3); percussion; backing vocals
- Armando Marçal - tambourine (8), djembe, cuica, goblet drum, congas, Latin drums, agogos and tamborim
- Aline, Amilaque, Felipe, Fernando, Gustavo, Núbia and Pedro - children's choir (11)
- Carlinhos Vaca Prenha, Carlos Henrique Groid, Eduardo Fifi, Rodrigo Molusco and O Rappa - "wronged" handclaps (12)
