= James Sample =

James Sample is the name of:

- James Sample (American football) (born 1992), American football safety
- James Sample (conductor) (1910–1995), American conductor
- Jim Sample (1921–1992), English footballer
- James Sample (preacher), American preacher

== See also ==
- James Samples (born 1963), American businessman
