= Samples (surname) =

Samples is a surname. Notable people with the surname include:

- Ed Samples (1921–1991), pioneering American stock car driver
- Jim Samples (born 1963), American businessman and media executive
- John Samples (born c. 1950s), American political theorist and author
- Junior Samples (1926–1983), American comedian
- Keith Samples (born 1955/56), American filmmaker
- Mike Samples (born 1950), professional Canadian football player
- Pete Samples (fl. 2000s–2010s), name of Canadian musician Brent Freedman

== See also ==
- Sample (surname)
