= Marion Sampler =

American designer

- Born: 1920; Anniston, Alabama
- Died: 1998 (aged 77–78)
- Citizenship: American
- Occupation: Designer

Marion Sampler was an American designer. Sampler was most known for being one of the first Black graphic designers to work in commercial design firms.

== Early life and education ==
Sampler was born in 1920 in Anniston, Alabama. His father was a painter, and Sampler himself began education in art early in his life in Cincinnati. Sampler then moved to California, enrolling in Jepson Art Institute in 1953, and afterward at California Institute of the Arts. Sampler transferred to the University of Southern California, and graduated from there in 1955.

== Career ==
After his graduation at University of Southern California, Sampler started teaching art at Fremont High School in Los Angeles. Although he would subsequently move on to work at commercial firms, Sampler continued to teach at Fremont High School.

In 1956, Sampler joined a design mentoring group created by Saul Bass, Norm Gollin, Louis Danziger, and Milton Zolotow. The program aimed to help people of color find employment and training in graphic design. Sampler was one of the first designers to benefit from the group. He joined Los Angeles County Museum of Art's design and typography program in the same year. In 1957, Sampler was employed by architecture firm Victor Gruen and Associates; becoming one of the first Black graphic designer to work in major architectural, or design firms in the Los Angeles. In 1963, Sampler became the head of the graphic design department, where he would remain working for 20 years.

In 1973, Gruen & Associates was contracted by developer Henry Segerstrom to design and build South Coast Plaza, a shopping center located in Orange County, California. The firm suggested a dome-like structure where skylight can shine in be built as a part of the mall. Segerstrom commissioned Marion Sampler to design the structure, which used stained glass to create a glass domed ceiling. Sampler continued to design for the retail company. He was commissioned to create identity design for the mall such as environmental graphics, logos, and tile walls.

In the mid-1980s, Sampler left Gruen & Associates and partnered with Anita Berry to start his own design firm, Anita Berry and Marion Sampler Design. He subsequently started producing paintings along with commissioned design work.

== Style ==
Sampler was known for his usage of geometry and shapes. His signature style featured brightly colored geometric shapes tightly packed into grid-like layouts. Sampler favored triangles and triangular forms, visible in many of his commercial designs as well as in his paintings. Pattern played a central part in Sampler's image making process, as this is a reoccurring theme in his designs. Sampler was influenced by Black quilt makers in Southern America, especially referencing their birds of flight form in his triangular patterns.

== Legacy ==
Sampler's work was largely forgotten after his death. Although recognized during his lifetime, and known well among designer circles in Los Angeles and New York, Sampler has had little acknowledgment after death. Sampler was listed in a few dictionaries of Black artists. His work was also included in the Los Angeles County Museum of Art's exhibition "California Design, 1930-1965: Living in a Modern Way". Four of Sampler's work are held in the collection of the California African American Museum. One of his paintings is held by the Metropolitan Museum of Art. Aside from other minor exhibitions, his body of work is largely obscured, with New York Times and Design Observer describing him as "forgotten".
