= Rappa Mundi =

Studio album by O Rappa
- Released: 1996
- Genre: Reggae fusion; funk rock; rap rock
- Length: 52:47
- Label: Warner Music
- Producer: Liminha

O Rappa chronology
O Rappa (1994)	Rappa Mundi (1996)	Lado B Lado A (1999)

Professional ratings
Review scores
Source	Rating
Allmusic	3/5 stars

Rappa Mundi is the second album by Brazilian band O Rappa. It was released in September 1996 through Warner Music.

== Track listing ==
1. "A Feira" - 3:59
2. "Miséria S.A." - 4:01
3. "Vapor Barato" - 4:23
4. "Ilê Ayê" – 3:50
5. "Hey Joe" – 4:25
6. "Pescador De Ilusões" - 4:15
7. "Uma Ajuda" - 4:29
8. "Eu Quero Ver Gol" - 3:41
9. "Eu Não Sei Mentir Direito" - 4:03
10. "O Homem Bomba" - 3:14
11. "Tumulto" - 3:14
12. "Lei Da Sobrevivência (Palha De Cana)" - 3:05
13. "Óia O Rapa" - 6:00

== Personnel ==
O Rappa

- Marcelo Falcão - lead vocals, rhythm guitar
- Marcelo Yuka - drums
- Xandão - lead guitar
- Marcelo Lobato - keyboards, samplers, backing vocals
- Lauro Farias - bass guitar, synth bass, backing vocals

Additional musicians

- Armando Marçal - percussion
- Dj Cléston - turntables, additional samplers
- Liminha - guitar, bass; rhythm programmation (2–3, 5, 12); electric organ and e-bow (9)
- Marcelo D2 - guest vocals (5)
