= O Rappa (album) =

Studio album by O Rappa
- Released: October 19, 1994
- Genre: Reggae fusion
- Length: 62:33
- Label: Warner Music
- Producer: Fábio Henriques

O Rappa chronology
O Rappa (1994)	Rappa Mundi (1996)

O Rappa is the first album by Brazilian band O Rappa. The album's sonorization is reggae fusion. It was released in 1994 through Warner Music.

== Track listing ==
1. "Catequeses Do Medo" - 3:56
2. "Não Vão Me Matar" - 5:17
3. "Todo Camburão Tem Um Pouco De Navio Negreiro" - 4:36
4. "Take It Easy My Brother Charles" – 4:06
5. "Brixton, Bronx Ou Baixada" – 4:47
6. "R.A.M." - 4:16
7. "Skunk Jammin'" - 0:34
8. "Coincidências E Paixões" - 4:38
9. "Fogo Cruzado" - 4:36
10. "À Noite" - 3:16
11. "Candidato Caô Caô" - 4:51
12. "Mitologia Gerimum" - 4:16
13. "Sujo" - 4:13
14. "Sujo - Dub" - 4:16
15. "Todo Camburão Tem Um Pouco De Navio Negreiro - Dub" - 4:30
16. "Vinheta Da Silva" - 0:25

== Personnel ==
=== O Rappa ===
- Marcelo Falcão – lead vocals
- Alexandre Menezes (Xandão) – guitar
- Nelson Meirelles – bass guitar
- Marcelo Lobato – keyboards, sampler, backing vocals
- Marcelo Yuka – drums

=== Additional musicians ===
==== On all tracks ====
- Marcos Suzano – percussion
  - Baxter – conga
- Chico Amaral – tenor saxophone
- Paulo Marcio – trumpet
- Pedro Aristides – trombone

==== Other ====
- Dj Cléston – record scratches (8)
- Bezerra da Silva – guest vocals (11)

== Production ==
The album was produced by Fábio Henriques.
