= Sample (graphics) =

In computer graphics, a sample is an intersection of a channel and a pixel.

The diagram below depicts a 24-bit pixel, consisting of 3 samples for Red, Green, and Blue.

Different samples within a pixel

In this particular diagram, the Red sample occupies 9 bits, the Green sample occupies 7 bits and the Blue sample occupies 8 bits, totaling 24 bits per pixel. Note that the samples do not have to be equal size and not all samples are mandatory in a pixel.

Also, a pixel can consist of more than 3 samples (e.g. 4 samples of the RGBA color space).

A sample is related to a subpixel on a physical display.
